= 2010–11 PAS Giannina F.C. season =

PAS Giannina
2010–11 season
- Chairman: Giorgos Christovasilis
- Manager: Stéphane Demol
- Stadium: Zosimades Stadium, Ioannina
- Football League: 2nd
- Greek Cup: Fifth round eliminated by PAOK
- Top goalscorer: League: Bakayoko; 19 goals All: Bakayoko; 21 goals
Home colours	Away colours

The 2010–11 season is PAS Giannina F.C.'s 26th competitive season in the second division of Greek football and 45th year in existence as a football club. They also compete in the Greek Cup.

== Players ==
Updated:-

No.	Name	Nationality	Position(s)	Place of birth	Date of birth	Signed from	Notes
Goalkeepers
1	Athanasios Kouventaris	(Greece)	GK	Sidirokastro, Greece	19 January 1983	(Greece) Doxa Kranoula	
30	Georgios Sikalias	(Greece)	GK	Athens, Greece	25 March 1986	(Greece) Ethnikos Piraeus	
71	Fotis Kipouros	(Greece)	GK	Thessaloniki, Greece	9 August 1975	(Greece) Olympiakos Volos	
Defenders
2	Georgios Dasios (C)	(Greece)	RB	Ioannina, Greece	12 May 1983	-	
3	Giannis Stathis	(Greece)	RB	Athens, Greece	20 May 1987	(Greece) Panathinaikos	
4	Ilias Kotsios	(Greece)	CB	Larissa, Greece	25 April 1977	(Greece) AEL	
5	Tasos Pantos	(Greece)	RB	Korydallos, Greece	5 May 1976	(Greece) Olympiacos	
6	Alexios Michail	(Greece)	CB	Ioannina, Greece	18 August 1986	(Greece) Panserraikos	
8	Themistoklis Tzimopoulos	(Greece)	CB	Kozani, Greece	20 November 1985	(Greece) Ethnikos Asteras	
14	Pavlos Vartziotis	(Greece)	CB	Ioannina, Greece	27 January 1981	(Greece) Kerkyra	
23	Marios Oikonomou	(Greece)	CB	Ioannina, Greece	6 October 1992	(Greece) PAS Giannina U-20	
27	Vanderson Scardovelli	(Brazil) (Italy)	LB	Dracena, Brazil	27 September 1984	(Italy) Treviso	
Midfielders
7	Tasos Kyriakos	(Greece)	RW	Giannouli, Larissa, Greece	14 August 1978	(Cyprus) AC Omonoia	
11	Manolis Skoufalis	(Greece)	RW	Nea Ionia, Athens, Greece	21 August 1978	(Greece) Panionios	
15	Tomas De Vincenti	(Argentina)	CM	Buenos Aires, Argentina	9 February 1989	(Greece) Kalamata	
16	Paraskevas Andralas	(Greece)	DM / CB	Piraeus, Greece	2 December 1978	(Greece) Levadiakos	
18	Esteban Buján	(Argentina)	DM	Capital Federal, Argentina	13 July 1979	(Argentina) CA Banfield	
21	Lambros Vangelis	(Greece)	CM	Neochori, Greece	10 February 1982	(Greece) PAOK	
24	Paul Keita	(Senegal)	DM	Dakar, Senegal	23 June 1992	(Portugal) Benfica B	
33	Christos Patsatzoglou	(Greece)	DM	Athens, Greece	19 March 1979	(Greece) AEK Athens	
77	Kostas Pappas	(Greece)	CM	Ioannina, Greece	30 November 1991	(Greece) PAS Giannina U-20	
19	Michael De Freitas	(Portugal)	RM		7 February 1992	(France) AS Monaco B	
-	Panagiotis Christovasilis	(Greece)	CM		14 April 1987	-	
Forwards
9	José Emílio Furtado	(Cape Verde) (Portugal)	FW	Praia, Cape Verde	14 March 1983	(Greece) Ionikos	
10	Dimitris Sialmas	(Greece)	FW	Athens, Greece	19 June 1986	(Greece) Olympiacos Volos	
20	Ibrahima Bakayoko	(Ivory Coast)	FW	Séguéla, Ivory Coast	31 December 1976	(Greece) PAOK	
22	Christos Tzanis	(Greece)	FW	Parapotamos, Greece	22 April 1985	(Greece) Anagennisi Arta	
Left during Winter Transfer Window
99	Christos Koutsospyros	(Greece)	FW	Agrinio, Greece	14 October 1981	(Greece) Atromitos	
55	Luiz Carlos Guedes Stukas	(Brazil)	CB	Porto Alegre, Brazil	10 March 1980	(Iran) Paykan	
17	Athanasios Nikolopoulos	(Greece)	FW	Patra, Greece	8 February 1989	(Greece) Korinthos	

=== International players ===
- (Greece) Christos Patsatzoglou (men's, U-21)
- (Ivory Coast) Ibrahima Bakayoko (men's)
- (Senegal) Paul Keita (U-20/17)
- (Greece) Georgios Sikalias (U-21)
- (Greece) Lambros Vangelis (U-21)
- (Portugal) Michael De Freitas (U-18/17)

=== Foreign players ===
EU Nationals
- (Portugal) Michael De Freitas

EU Nationals (Dual Citizenship)
- (Brazil) (Italy) (Europe) Vanderson Scardovelli
- (Cape Verde) (Portugal) (Europe) José Emílio Furtado

Non-EU Nationals
- (Argentina) Leandro Becerra
- (Argentina) Tomas De Vincenti
- (Uruguay) Nicolás Schenone
- (Senegal) Paul Keita
- (Ivory Coast) Ibrahima Bakayoko
- (Brazil) Luiz Carlos Guedes Stukas

== Personnel ==
=== Management ===
Position	Staff
Majority Owner	Giorgos Christovasilis
President and CEO	Giorgos Christovasilis
Team manager	Giannis Tatsis
Director of Office	Alekos Potsis
Head of Ticket Department	Andreas Potsis

=== Coaching staff ===
Position	Name
Head coach	Stéphane Demol
Assistant coach	Vasilis Papagelis
Fitness coach	Thomas Giannitopoulos
Goalkeepers Coach	Dimitris Niarchakos

=== Medical staff ===
Position	Name
Head doctor	Spyros Siaravas
Physio	Filipos Skordos

=== Academy ===
Position	Name
Head coach U-21	Andreas Lavdarias

== Transfers ==
=== Summer ===
==== In ====
No	Pos	Player	Transferred from	Fee	Date	Source
99	FW	Christos Koutsospyros	Kalamata	Loan Return	7 May 2010	
7	RW	Tasos Kyriakos	AC Omonoia	-	1 June 2010	
17	FW	Athanasios Nikolopoulos	Korinthos	-	16 June 2010	
11	RW	Manolis Skoufalis	Panionios	-	28 June 2010	
1	GK	Athanasios Kouventaris	Doxa Kranoula	Loan Return	1 July 2010	
6	CB	Alexios Michail	Panserraikos	Loan Return	1 July 2010	
10	FW	Dimitris Sialmas	Olympiacos Volos	Loan Return	1 July 2010	
15	CM	Tomas De Vincenti	Kalamata	Loan Return	1 July 2010	
	LB	Giorgos Margaritis	Agrotikos Asteras	Loan Return	1 July 2010	
	CB	Panagiotis Tzimas	Ethnikos Filippiadas	Loan Return	1 July 2010	
	FW	Giorgos Lappas	Ethnikos Filippiadas	Loan Return	1 July 2010	
	CB	Giorgos Karakostas	Ethnikos Piraeus	Loan Return	1 July 2010	
	ML	Jean Marie Sylla	Kalamata	Loan Return	1 July 2010	
	DF	Giorgos Kolios	Anagennisi Arta	Loan Return	1 July 2010	
71	GK	Fotis Kipouros	Olympiacos Volos	-	7 July 2010	
5	RB	Tasos Pantos	Olympiacos	-	9 July 2010	
24	DM	Paul Keita	Benfica B	-	23 July 2010	
19	RM	Michael De Freitas	AS Monaco B	-	31 August 2010	
8	CB	Themistoklis Tzimopoulos	Ethnikos Asteras	-	2 September 2010	
9	FW	José Emílio Furtado	Ionikos	-	9 September 2010	
55	CB	Luiz Carlos Guedes Stukas	Paykan	-	9 September 2010	

==== Out ====
No	Pos	Player	Transferred to	Fee	Date	Source
8	CM	Kostas Mendrinos	Aris Thessaloniki	-	7 May 2010	
6	LB	Petros Kanakoudis	Iraklis Thessaloniki	-	11 May 2010	
11	ST	Evangelos Kontogoulidis	AO Trikala	-	24 May 2010	
4	CB	Georgios Kousas	Panetolikos	-	24 May 2010	
9	FW	Giorgos Saitiotis	Veria	-	24 May 2010	
1	GK	Nikos Zafeiropoulos	Retired	-	25 May 2010	
19	CB	Ivica Majstorović	AO Kerkyra	-	31 May 2010	
33	GK	Dimitris Elefteropoulos	Iraklis Thessaloniki	-	25 June 2010	
66	DM	Vasilios Rovas	Aris Thessaloniki	Loan Return	30 June 2010	
	ML	Jean Marie Sylla	-	End of contract	30 June 2010	
	LB	Giorgos Margaritis	Nafpaktiakos Asteras	Loan	1 July 2010	
	DF	Giorgos Kolios	Doxa Kranoula	Loan	1 July 2010	
	GK	Panagiotis Lolas	Panegialios	Loan	1 July 2010	
77	CB	Lefteris Vatsis	Doxa Kranoula	Loan	1 July 2010	
	CB	Panagiotis Tzimas	Lamia	-	14 July 2010	
	FW	Giorgos Lappas	Ethnikos Filippiadas	-	21 July 2010	
23	FW	Patrick Dimbala	Free	Released	14 August 2010	
7	ML	Ilias Michalopoulos	Veria	-	31 August 2010	
28	DM	Nicolás Schenone		Released		
	CM / CF	Evripidis Giakos	Doxa Kranoula	Loan Extension		
	LB	Kostas Pagonis	Ethnikos Piraeus	Loan Extension		
	CB	Giorgos Karakostas	Doxa Drama	-		
17	RB	Kostantinos Kaznaferis	Aris Thessaloniki	-		
81	MF	Mirnes Šišić	Iraklis Thessaloniki	-		
82	LW	Salim Arrache	Asteras Tripoli	-		
	LB	Kostas Louboutis	-	Retired		

=== Winter ===
==== In ====
No	Pos	Player	Transferred from	Fee	Date	Source
	DM	Nicolás Schenone		-	3 January 2011	
23	CB	Marios Oikonomou	PAS Giannina U-21	-	3 January 2011	
33	DM	Christos Patsatzoglou	AEK Athens	-	5 January 2011	
	LB	Giorgos Margaritis	Nafpaktiakos Asteras	Loan Return		

==== Out ====
No	Pos	Player	Transferred to	Fee	Date	Source
99	FW	Christos Koutsospyros	Veria	-	18 January 2011	
	FW	Athanasios Nikolopoulos	Thrasyvoulos	Loan	26 January 2011	
	DM	Nicolás Schenone	Anagennisi Karditsa	Loan		
	CB	Luiz Carlos Guedes Stukas	Anagennisi Karditsa	Loan		
	LB	Giorgos Margaritis	Anagennisi Karditsa	Loan		

== Pre-season and friendlies ==
Win Draw Loss Upcoming fixture

31 July 2010 Friendly	PAS Giannina	2-2	Veria	ioannina
18:00	Sialmas 10'; Buján 84' (pen.)	Report	Kapias 86', 90'	Stadium: Zosimades Stadium; Attendance: 300; Referee: Simeonidis

2 August 2010 Friendly	PAS Giannina	4-0	Doxa Kranoula	unknown
18:00	Skoufalis 4'; Kotsios 34'; Bakayoko 47', 51'	Report		Stadium: unknown Attendance: unknown Referee: unknown

4 August 2010 Friendly	PAS Giannina	3-1	Panachaiki	Elatochori
18:30	De Vincenti 8'; Kotsios 45+'; Kyriakos 80'	Report	Kyvelidis 17' (pen.)	Stadium: unknown Attendance: unknown Referee: unknown

7 August 2010 Friendly	Pierikos	2-1	PAS Giannina	Katerini
19:30	Gougoulias 43'; Konstantinidis 61'		Kotsios 15'	Stadium: Katerini Stadium; Attendance: unknown Referee: unknown

13 August 2010 Friendly	Olympiacos Volos	2-2	PAS Giannina	Volos
21:15	Umbides 8', 56' (pen.)		Vanderson 58'; Sialmas 73'	Stadium: Volos Municipal Stadium; Attendance: unknown Referee: Giorgos Daloukas

17 August 2010 Friendly	Trikala	2-3	PAS Giannina	Trikala
20:15	Giannis Christou 40'; Korbos 53'		Bakayoko 5' (pen.), 50', 77'	Stadium: Trikala Municipal Stadium; Attendance: unknown Referee: Vagelis Gratsanis

18 August 2010 Friendly	PAS Giannina	1-1	Doxa Kranoula	Anatoli
	Koutsospyros 2'		Papavasiliou 13'	Stadium: Anatoli Municipal Stadium; Attendance: unknown Referee: Alexandros Katsikogiannis

18 August 2010 Friendly	PAS Giannina	2-1	AO Anatoli	Anatoli
	Koutsospyros 13', 22'		Katsifas 2'	Stadium: Anatoli Municipal Stadium; Attendance: unknown Referee: Alexandros Katsikogiannis

21 August 2010 Friendly	Larissa	0–0	PAS Giannina	Larissa
17:30				Stadium: Alcazar Stadium; Attendance: unknown Referee: Alexandros Aretopoulos

25 August 2010 Friendly	Thesprotos	1-5	PAS Giannina	Igoumenitsa
19:00	Tsiatouras 27' (pen.)	Report	Tzanis 41'; Bakayoko 49' (pen.), 73'; Sialmas 71', 77'	Stadium: Municipal Stadium of Igoumenitsa; Attendance: unknown Referee: Giorgos Kominis

27 August 2010 Friendly	PAS Giannina	7-2	PAS Giannina U-21	Ioannina
09:00	Sialmas (?); Koutsospyros (?); Kotsios (?); Bakayoko (?); Tzanis (?)	Report	Chisototsi (?); Gekas (?)	Stadium: PEAKI; Attendance: unknown Referee: unknown

4 September 2010 Friendly	PAS Giannina	0-1	Aris Thessaloniki	ioannina
18:00		Report	Neto 87'	Stadium: PEAKI; Attendance: unknown Referee: Aristomenis Kotsiaftis

7 September 2010 Friendly	Proodeftiki Perama	1-7	PAS Giannina	Perama, Ioannina
18:00	Kabosioris 45'	Report	Tzimopoulos 11'; Furtado 16', 41'; Koutsospyros 23', 65'; Luiz Carlos 33'; De Freitas 61'	Stadium: Perama Municipal Stadium; Attendance: unknown Referee: unknown

29 September 2010 Friendly	PAS Giannina	2-0	Doxa Kranoula	Ioannina
	Furtado 4', 19'			Stadium: PEAKI; Attendance: unknown Referee: Alexandros Katsikogiannis

17 November 2010 Friendly	PAS Giannina	2-0	Doxa Kranoula	Ioannina
15:00	Furtado 35', 45'			Stadium: PEAKI; Attendance: unknown Referee: unknown

24 November 2010 Friendly	Kozani	0-1	PAS Giannina	Kozani
15:00			Koutsospyros 19'	Stadium: unknown Attendance: unknown Referee: unknown

9 February 2011 Friendly	PAS Preveza	0-5	PAS Giannina	Preveza
15:30			Furtado 10', 64', 85'; De Vincenti 50'; Skoufalis 73'	Stadium: Athanasia Tsoumeleka Municipal Stadium; Attendance: unknown Referee: Ripis

6 April 2011 Friendly	Thesprotos	2-3	PAS Giannina	Igoumenitsa
16:00	Nanos 65'; Balogiannis 84' (pen.)		Bakayoko 20'; Furtado 57'; Bagias 82'	Stadium: Municipal Stadium of Igoumenitsa; Attendance: unknown Referee: Tsakos

20 April 2011 Friendly	PAS Giannina	1-2	Doxa Kranoula	Ioannina
16:00	Tzimopoulos 74'		Giakos 48' (pen.); Chiras 55'	Stadium: Zosimades Stadium; Attendance: unknown Referee: Alexandros Katsikogiannis

18 May 2011 Friendly	PAS Giannina	2-2	Aris Thessaloniki	Ioannina
19:00	Bakayoko 23'; Skoufalis 77'		Mendrinos 45+1' (pen.); Angeloudis 76'	Stadium: Zosimades Stadium; Attendance: unknown Referee: Giorgos Kominis

== Competitions ==
=== League table ===
Pos	Team	Pld	W	D	L	GF	GA	GD	Pts	Promotion or relegation
1	Panetolikos (C, P)	34	23	6	5	47	19	+28	75	Promotion to Super League
2	PAS Giannina (P)	34	22	8	4	55	17	+38	74	Promotion to Super League
3	OFI (P)	34	21	6	7	42	20	+22	69	Qualification for promotion play-offs
4	Levadiakos (P)	34	17	9	8	48	33	+15	60	Qualification for promotion play-offs
5	Doxa Drama (P)	34	16	8	10	51	28	+23	56	Qualification for promotion play-offs

Source: Football League, Soccerway
Rules for classification: 1) points; 2) head-to-head points; 3) head-to-head goal difference; 4) head-to-head goals scored; 5) goal difference; 6) number of goals scored.
(C) Champions; (P) Promoted

==== Results summary ====
Overall								Home						Away					
Pld	W	D	L	GF	GA	GD	Pts	W	D	L	GF	GA	GD	W	D	L	GF	GA	GD
34	22	8	4	55	17	+38	74	16	1	0	39	4	+35	6	7	4	16	13	+3

=== Fixtures ===
Win Draw Loss Upcoming fixture

13 September 2010 1	PAS Giannina	2-1	Panthrakikos	Ioannina
18:30	Sialmas 4'; Keita (yellow card) 30'; Sialmas (yellow card) 55'; Andralas (yellow card) 71'; Andralas 90'; Koutsospyros (yellow card) 90'	Report	Kanotidis (yellow card) 37'; Soultanidis 76'; Arsenijević (yellow card) 83'; Iasonidis (yellow card) 86'	Stadium: Zosimades Stadium; Referee: Charalabos Kalogeropoulos

20 September 2010 2	Ethnikos Piraeus	1-3	PAS Giannina	Elliniko
17:00	Kokkinis (yellow card) 22'; Syros (yellow card) 50'; Masmanidis (yellow card) 63'; Korakakis 90+2'	Report	Keita (yellow card) 11'; Bakayoko 23' (pen.), 70'; De Vincenti (yellow card) 31'; Kyriakos 90+4'	Stadium: Elliniko Stadium; Referee: Antonis Valiotis

26 September 2010 3	PAS Giannina	3-0	GS Ilioupolis	Ioannina
16:00	Bakayoko 11', 33'; Andralas (yellow card) 27'; Bakayoko (yellow card) 48'; Pantos (yellow card) 50'; Kyriakos 82'	Report	Kritikos (yellow card) 25'; Kampas (yellow card) 46'; Načevski (yellow card) 55'; Stathis Stefanidis (yellow card) 63'; Sikalias (yellow card) 81'	Stadium: Zosimades Stadium; Referee: Aristidis Vatsios

3 October 2010 4	Agrotikos Asteras	0-0	PAS Giannina	Evosmos
16:00	Sapanis (yellow card) 20'; Gogolos (yellow card) 44'; Chasiotis (yellow card) 54'; Stefanidis (yellow card) 68'	Report	Kotsios (yellow card) 20'; Skoufalis (yellow card) 39'; Andralas (yellow card) 42'; Kyriakos (yellow card) 60'	Stadium: Agrotikos Asteras Stadium; Referee: Georgios Kyzas

11 October 2010 5	PAS Giannina	3-1	S.F.K. Pierikos	Ioannina
19:00	Andralas 11'; Vanderson 28'; Keita (yellow card) 55'; De Vincenti (yellow card) 60'; Kotsios 61'; Tzimopoulos (yellow card) 90'	Report	Penta (yellow card) 37'; Giorgos Tasidis (yellow card) 53'; Giorgos Poulakos (yellow card) 77'; Pavlos Dimou 80'	Stadium: Zosimades Stadium; Referee: Agelos Evangelou

18 October 2010 6	PAS Giannina	3–0	Panetolikos	Ioannina
19:00	Tzanis 40'; Bakayoko 50', 79'; Kyriakos (yellow card) 90'	Report	Anastasiadis (yellow card) 4'	Stadium: Zosimades Stadium; Referee: Antonios Valiotis

24 October 2010 7	Veria	0-1	PAS Giannina	Veria
15:00	Barbas (yellow card) 26'; Dimitris Tsiatsios (yellow card) 32'; Kali (yellow card) 51'; Saitiotis (yellow card) 60'	Report	Tzanis 37'; Bakayoko (yellow card) 53'; Skoufalis (yellow card) 75'	Stadium: Veria Stadium; Referee: Ioannis Topouzis

31 October 2010 8	PAS Giannina	1–0	Anagennisi Karditsa	Ioannina
15:00	Andralas 27'	Report		Stadium: Zosimades Stadium; Referee: Andreas Lagos

13 November 2010 9	Kallithea	0-3	PAS Giannina	Kallithea
15:00	michalis tzorbatzakis (yellow card) ?' (yellow-red card) ?'; Iraklis (yellow card) ?'	Report	Kotsios 71'; Bakayoko 75' (pen.), 80'; Bakayoko (yellow card) ?'; Tzimopoulos (yellow card) ?'	Stadium: Grigoris Lambrakis Stadium; Referee: Stefanos Mantakis

21 November 2010 10	PAS Giannina	0–0	Ionikos	Ioannina
15:00	Pantos (yellow card) ?'; Sialmas (yellow card) ?'	Report	Melabianakis (yellow card) ?'; Arvanitis (yellow card) ?'	Stadium: Zosimades Stadium; Referee: Symeon Kosikidis

29 November 2010 11	Diagoras	0-0	PAS Giannina	Rhodes
18:00	Zouroudis (yellow card) 45'; Tarachulski (yellow card) 74'; Salamastrakis (yellow card) ?' (yellow-red card) 89'	Report	Tzimopoulos (yellow card) 30'; Andralas (yellow card) 68'	Stadium: Diagoras Stadium; Referee: Aristidis Vatsios

5 December 2010 12	PAS Giannina	2–0	Trikala	Ioannina
15:00	Vanderson 12'; Vanderson (yellow card) 21'; De Vincenti (yellow card) 77'; Dasios (yellow card) 81'; Bakayoko 90'	Report	Telkiyski (yellow card) 25'; Barrientos (yellow card) 77'; Boukouvalas (yellow card) 87'; Rizogiannis (yellow card) ?'	Stadium: Zosimades Stadium; Referee: Georgios Kyzas

11 December 2010 13	Levadiakos	1-0	PAS Giannina	Livadeia
15:00	Tasić (yellow card) 34'; Popović (yellow card) 34'; Taralidis (yellow card) 90'; Barkoglou 90'	Report	De Vincenti (yellow card) 34'; Pantos (yellow card) 45'; Keita (yellow card) 49'; Bakayoko (yellow card) 90'	Stadium: Levadia Municipal Stadium; Referee: Charalampos Kalogeropoulos

15 December 2010 14	Thrasyvoulos	0-1	PAS Giannina	Fyli
19:00	Giannis Kolotouros (yellow card) 41'; Frimpong (yellow card) 87'	Report	Stathis (yellow card) 14'; Andralas (yellow card) 20'; Keita (yellow card) 43'; Vangelis (yellow card) 75'; Koutsospyros (yellow card) 75'; Sialmas 81'; Kyriakos (yellow card) 90'	Stadium: Fyli Municipal Stadium; Referee: Georgios Daskalopoulos

19 December 2010 15	PAS Giannina	1–0	Doxa Drama	Ioannina
15:00	Kyriakos 54'; Pantos (yellow card) ?'	Report	González (yellow card) ?'; Chloros (yellow card) ?'	Stadium: Zosimades Stadium; Referee: Spyros Selimos

5 January 2011 16	Ethnikos Asteras	0-1	PAS Giannina	Kaisariani
19:00	Georgios Chorianopoulos (yellow card) ?'; Konstantinos Frangis (yellow card) ?'; Traoré (yellow card) ?'; Athanasios Palaskas (yellow card) ?'	Report	Bakayoko 37'; Andralas (yellow card) ?'; Vanderson (yellow card) ?'; Sikalias (yellow card) ?'	Stadium: Michalis Kritikopoulos Stadium; Referee: Antonis Valiotis

10 January 2011 17	PAS Giannina	1–0	OFI Crete	Ioannina
19:00	Kyriakos 24'; Dasios (yellow card) ?'; Keita (yellow card) ?'; Sialmas (yellow card) ?'; Kotsios (yellow card) ?'; Andralas (yellow card) ?'	Report	Bertin (red card) 45+2'; Yakubu (yellow card) ?'; Kalajdžić (yellow card) ?'; Kiassos (yellow card) ?'; Verón (yellow card) ?'	Stadium: Zosimades Stadium; Referee: Marios Lampropoulos

17 January 2011 18	Panthrakikos	0-2	PAS Giannina	Komotini
18:00	Natsouras (yellow card) ?'; Perperidis (yellow card) ?'	Report	Kotsios 7'; Bakayoko 56'; Tzimopoulos (yellow card) ?'	Stadium: Komotini Municipal Stadium; Referee: Antonis Papapetrou

23 January 2011 19	PAS Giannina	3–1	Ethnikos Piraeus	Ioannina
15:00	Tzanis 6'; Sialmas 67', 89'; Kyriakos (yellow card) ?'; Keita (yellow card) ?'	Report	Psianos 38'; Kokkinis (yellow card) ?'; Giorgos Vidalis (yellow card) ?'; Farinola (yellow card) ?'; Waldir Lucas Pereira (yellow card) ?'; Tsemperidis (yellow card) ?'	Stadium: Zosimades Stadium; Referee: Fotios Fotiadis

30 January 2011 20	GS Ilioupolis	1-1	PAS Giannina	Ilioupoli
15:00	Kritikos 37'; Marrama (yellow card) ?'; Urošević (yellow card) ?'	Report	Furtado 90'; Dasios (yellow card) ?'	Stadium: Ilioupoli Municipal Stadium; Referee: Georgios Segkos

5 February 2011 21	PAS Giannina	1–0	Agrotikos Asteras	Ioannina
15:00	Sialmas 24'; Kotsios (yellow card) ?'	Report	Georgios Tsoukalidis (yellow card) ?'; Dimitrios Skliopidis (yellow card) ?'	Stadium: Zosimades Stadium; Referee: Stefanos Mantakis

13 February 2011 22	S.F.K. Pierikos	1-1	PAS Giannina	Katerini
15:00	Milošković 89'; Panagiotis Giazitzoglou (yellow card) ?'; Stamoulis Petrou (yellow card) ?'	Report	Bakayoko 86'; Pantos (yellow card) ?'; Kotsios (yellow card) ?'	Stadium: Katerini Stadium; Referee: Efthalia Mitsi

21 February 2011 23	Panetolikos	1-1	PAS Giannina	Agrinio
15:00	Pappas 23'; Gurma (yellow card) ?'; Paleologos (yellow card) ?'	Report	Pantos (yellow card) ?' (yellow-red card) 69'; Furtado 74'; Dasios (yellow card) ?'	Stadium: Panetolikos Stadium; Referee: Antonis Papapetrou

27 February 2011 24	PAS Giannina	5–0	Veria	Ioannina
15:00	Sialmas 13'; Bakayoko 59', 69'; De Vincenti 74'; Skoufalis 81'; Sialmas (yellow card) ?'; Andralas (yellow card) ?'	Report	Koutsospyros (yellow card) ?'; Kantimiris (yellow card) ?'	Stadium: Zosimades Stadium; Referee: Georgios Giannoulakis

5 March 2011 25	Anagennisi Karditsa	1-1	PAS Giannina	Karditsa
15:00	Raone Gomes 4'; Athanasiadis (yellow card) ?'; Dorival (yellow card) ?'; Theodosiadis (yellow card) ?'	Report	Bakayoko 90'; Kotsios (yellow card) ?'; Tzanis (yellow card) ?'; Pantos (yellow card) ?'	Stadium: Municipal Stadium of Karditsa; Referee: Angelos Evangelou

13 March 2011 26	PAS Giannina	3–1	Kallithea	Ioannina
15:00	Bakayoko 52'; Tzanis 64'; Skoufalis 90+1'; De Vincenti (yellow card) ?'; Tzanis (yellow card) ?'	Report	Dimitrios Papanastasiou 61'; Koutroumpis (yellow card) ?'; Charalampos Mouratidis (yellow card) ?'	Stadium: Zosimades Stadium; Referee: Triantafyllos Tikas

21 March 2011 27	Ionikos	0-0	PAS Giannina	Nikaia
18:00	Thomas Vlachos (yellow card) ?'; Delibasis (yellow card) ?'	Report	Sialmas (yellow card) ?'; Tzanis (yellow card) ?'	Stadium: Neapoli; Referee: Stavros Iosifidis

28 March 2011 28	PAS Giannina	5–0	Diagoras	Ioannina
19:00	Sialmas 18', 25'; Skoufalis 29'; Kotsios 74'; Michail 86'; Skoufalis (yellow card) ?'	Report		Stadium: Zosimades Stadium; Referee: Charalampos Kalogeropoulos

4 April 2011 29	Trikala	1-0	PAS Giannina	Trikala
18:00	Christos Mingas 20'; Korbos (yellow card) ?'; Manousakis (yellow card) ?'	Report	Kyriakos (yellow card) ?'; Pantos (yellow card) ?'; Michail (yellow card) ?'	Stadium: Trikala Municipal Stadium; Referee: Georgios Liachoudis

11 April 2011 30	PAS Giannina	2–0	Levadiakos	Ioannina
18:00	Sialmas 67'; Michail (yellow card) ?' (yellow-red card) 72'; Bakayoko 87' (pen.); Keita (yellow card) ?'; Pantos (yellow card) ?'; Sialmas (yellow card) ?'	Report	Barkoglou (yellow card) ?'; Macheras (yellow card) ?'; Tripotseris (yellow card) ?'; Taralidis (yellow card) ?'; Vasiliou (yellow card) ?'	Stadium: Zosimades Stadium; Referee: Fotis Fotiadis

17 April 2011 31	PAS Giannina	1–0	Thrasyvoulos	Ioannina
16:00	Sialmas 90'; Dasios (yellow card) ?'	Report	Giannis Kolotouros (yellow card) ?'; Paligeorgos (yellow card) ?'	Stadium: Zosimades Stadium; Referee: Efthalia Mitsi

1 May 2011 32	Doxa Drama	2-0	PAS Giannina	Drama
17:15	Chloros 31'; Kappel 61'; Marcelo de Faria (yellow card) ?'; Christos Chatzipantelidis (yellow card) ?'; Vertzos (yellow card) ?'	Report	Vangelis (yellow card) ?'; De Vincenti (yellow card) ?'; Dasios (yellow card) ?'; Tzanis (yellow card) ?'	Stadium: Doxa Drama Stadium; Referee: Ilias Spathas

8 May 2011 33	PAS Giannina	3–0	Ethnikos Asteras	Ioannina
17:15	Bakayoko 10', 82'; Sialmas 65'	Report	Franceschi (yellow card) ?'	Stadium: Zosimades Stadium; Referee: Praxitelis Zachariadis

15 May 2011 34	OFI Crete	4-1	PAS Giannina	Heraklion, Crete
17:15	Agritis 45' (pen.), 75'; Kampantais 57'; Yakubu 70'; Galanopoulos (yellow card) ?' (yellow-red card) 90+2'; Kampantais (yellow card) ?'; Yakubu (yellow card) ?'	Report	Patsatzoglou 40'; Andralas (yellow card) ?'; Skoufalis (yellow card) ?'; Pantos (yellow card) ?'	Stadium: Theodoros Vardinogiannis; Referee: Vasilios Pamporidis

=== Greek cup ===
==== Second round ====
16 September 2010 Second round	Odysseas Anagennisi	0-2	PAS Giannina	Anagennisi
15:45	Spyros Gagas (yellow card) ?'; Savvas Kyriakidis (yellow card) ?'; Athanasios Tragiannis (yellow card) ?'; Toly Paizanos (yellow card) ?'		Skoufalis 60'; Buján 64'; Koutsospyros (yellow card) ?'; Skoufalis (yellow card) ?'; Kyriakos (yellow card) ?'	Stadium: Anagennisi Stadium; Attendance: unknown Referee: Giorgos Liachoudis

==== Fourth round ====
27 October 2010 Fourth round	PAS Giannina	1-0	Ergotelis	Ioannina
15:00	Bakayoko 45'; Kyriakos (yellow card) ?'; Tzimopoulos (yellow card) ?'		Wisio (yellow card) ?'; Romano (yellow card) ?'; Leal (yellow card) ?' (yellow-red card) 90+2'	Stadium: Zosimades Stadium; Attendance: unknown Referee: Apostolos Ambarkiolis

==== Fifth round ====
22 December 2010 Fifth round	PAOK	2-1	PAS Giannina	Thessaloniki
15:30	Vanderson 2' (o.g.); Athanasiadis 42'; Vieirinha (yellow card) 88'; Cirillo (yellow card) 90+1'		De Vincenti (yellow card) 49'; Bakayoko 54'; Skoufalis (yellow card) 86'	Stadium: Toumba Stadium; Attendance: 15223; Referee: Michalis Voskakis

== Statistics ==
=== Appearances ===
No.	Pos.	Nat.	Name	Greek Football League	Greek Cup	Total
No.	Pos.	Nat.	Name	Apps	Apps	Apps
1	GK	(Greece)	Athanasios Kouventaris	0	0	0
2	RB	(Greece)	Georgios Dasios	31	3	34
3	RB	(Greece)	Giannis Stathis	4	2	6
4	CB	(Greece)	Ilias Kotsios	30	2	32
5	RB	(Greece)	Tasos Pantos	30	3	33
6	CB	(Greece)	Alexios Michail	18	2	20
7	RW	(Greece)	Tasos Kyriakos	28	3	31
8	CB	(Greece)	Themistoklis Tzimopoulos	21	2	23
9	FW	(Cape Verde) (Portugal)	José Emílio Furtado	15	0	15
10	FW	(Greece)	Dimitris Sialmas	29	1	30
11	RW	(Greece)	Manolis Skoufalis	28	3	31
14	CB	(Greece)	Pavlos Vartziotis	0	1	1
15	CM	(Argentina)	Tomas De Vincenti	29	2	31
16	DM / CB	(Greece)	Paraskevas Andralas	31	3	34
17	FW	(Greece)	Athanasios Nikolopoulos	1	1	2
18	DM	(Argentina)	Esteban Buján	5	1	6
19	RM	(Portugal)	Michael De Freitas	0	0	0
20	FW	(Ivory Coast)	Ibrahima Bakayoko	30	2	32
21	CM	(Greece)	Lambros Vangelis	8	1	9
22	FW	(Greece)	Christos Tzanis	30	1	31
23	CB	(Greece)	Marios Oikonomou	0	0	0
24	DM	(Senegal)	Paul Keita	29	2	31
27	LB	(Brazil) (Italy)	Vanderson Scardovelli	29	2	31
30	GK	(Greece)	Georgios Sikalias	8	2	10
33	DM	(Greece)	Christos Patsatzoglou	12	0	12
55	CB	(Brazil)	Luiz Carlos Guedes Stukas	1	1	2
71	GK	(Greece)	Fotis Kipouros	26	1	27
77	CM	(Greece)	Kostas Pappas	0	0	0
99	FW	(Greece)	Christos Koutsospyros	2	1	3
	CM	(Greece)	Panagiotis Christovasilis	0	0	0

=== Goalscorers ===
No.	Pos.	Nat.	Name	Greek Football League	Greek Cup	Total
No.	Pos.	Nat.	Name	Goals	Goals	Goals
20	FW	(Ivory Coast)	Ibrahima Bakayoko	19	2	21
10	FW	(Greece)	Dimitris Sialmas	11	0	11
7	RW	(Greece)	Tasos Kyriakos	4	0	4
4	CB	(Greece)	Ilias Kotsios	4	0	4
11	RW	(Greece)	Manolis Skoufalis	3	1	4
22	FW	(Greece)	Christos Tzanis	4	0	4
16	DM / CB	(Greece)	Paraskevas Andralas	3	0	3
9	FW	(Cape Verde) (Portugal)	José Emílio Furtado	2	0	2
27	LB	(Brazil) (Italy)	Vanderson Scardovelli	2	0	2
6	CB	(Greece)	Alexios Michail	1	0	1
15	CM	(Argentina)	Tomas De Vincenti	1	0	1
18	DM	(Argentina)	Esteban Buján	0	1	1
33	DM	(Greece)	Christos Patsatzoglou	1	0	1

=== Clean sheets ===
No.	Pos.	Nat.	Name	Greek Football League	Greek Cup	Total
No.	Pos.	Nat.	Name	CS	CS	CS
1	GK	(Greece)	Athanasios Kouventaris	0 (0)	0 (0)	0 (0)
30	GK	(Greece)	Georgios Sikalias	5 (8)	1 (2)	6 (10)
71	GK	(Greece)	Fotis Kipouros	16 (26)	1 (1)	17 (27)

=== Disciplinary record ===
S	P	N	Name	Football League			Greek Cup			Total		
S	P	N	Name	Yellow card	Yellow-red card	Red card	Yellow card	Yellow-red card	Red card	Yellow card	Yellow-red card	Red card
2	RB	(Greece)	Georgios Dasios	6	0	0	0	0	0	6	0	0
3	RB	(Greece)	Giannis Stathis	1	0	0	0	0	0	1	0	0
4	CB	(Greece)	Ilias Kotsios	5	0	0	0	0	0	5	0	0
5	RB	(Greece)	Tasos Pantos	9	1	0	0	0	0	9	1	0
6	CB	(Greece)	Alexios Michail	1	1	0	0	0	0	1	1	0
7	RW	(Greece)	Tasos Kyriakos	5	0	0	2	0	0	7	0	0
8	CB	(Greece)	Themistoklis Tzimopoulos	4	0	0	1	0	0	5	0	0
10	FW	(Greece)	Dimitris Sialmas	6	0	0	0	0	0	6	0	0
11	RW	(Greece)	Manolis Skoufalis	4	0	0	2	0	0	6	0	0
15	CM	(Argentina)	Tomas De Vincenti	6	0	0	1	0	0	7	0	0
16	DM / CB	(Greece)	Paraskevas Andralas	9	0	0	0	0	0	9	0	0
20	FW	(Ivory Coast)	Ibrahima Bakayoko	4	0	0	0	0	0	4	0	0
21	CM	(Greece)	Lambros Vangelis	2	0	0	0	0	0	2	0	0
22	FW	(Greece)	Christos Tzanis	4	0	0	0	0	0	4	0	0
24	DM	(Senegal)	Paul Keita	8	0	0	0	0	0	8	0	0
27	LB	(Brazil) (Italy)	Vanderson Scardovelli	2	0	0	0	0	0	2	0	0
30	GK	(Greece)	Georgios Sikalias	1	0	0	0	0	0	1	0	0
99	FW	(Greece)	Christos Koutsospyros	2	0	0	1	0	0	3	0	0

=== Awards ===
Top Scorer of Beta Ethniki:Ibrahima Bakayoko (19 goals)

Source: Soccerway
