= 2008–09 PAS Giannina F.C. season =

PAS Giannina
2008–09 season
- Chairman: Alexis Kougias (until 3 July 2008); Giorgos Christovasilis
- Manager: Nikos Anastopoulos (until 3 July 2008); Ángel Guillermo Hoyos (10 July 2008 to 29 April 2009); Miltos Mastoras (caretaker, from 29 April 2009 until 25 May 2009)
- Stadium: Zosimades Stadium, Ioannina
- Beta Ethniki: 2nd
- Greek Cup: Additional round eliminated by Kerkyra

The 2008–09 season is PAS Giannina's 25th competitive season in the second division of Greek football and 43rd year in existence as a football club. They also compete in the Greek Cup.

== Players ==
Updated:-

No.	Name	Nationality	Position(s)	Place of birth	Date of birth	Signed from	Notes
Goalkeepers
1	Nikos Zafeiropoulos (VC2)	(Greece)	GK	Patras, Greece	8 January 1974	(Greece) Levadiakos	
30	Georgios Sikalias	(Greece)	GK	Athens, Greece	25 March 1986	(Greece) Ethnikos Piraeus	
15	Panagiotis Lolas	(Greece)	GK	Ioannina, Greece	26 June 1992	(Greece) PAS Giannina U21	
34	Athanasios Kouventaris	(Greece)	GK	Sidirokastro, Greece	19 January 1983	(Greece) PAS Preveza	
Defenders
2	Georgios Dasios (C)	(Greece)	RB	Ioannina, Greece	12 May 1983	-	
3	Kostas Pagonis	(Greece)	LB	Athens, Greece	11 September 1985	(Greece) Atromitos	
4	Georgios Kousas	(Greece)	CB	Thessaloniki, Greece	12 August 1982	(Greece) Apollon Kalamarias	
5	Spyros Gogolos	(Greece)	CB	Kerkyra, Greece	11 August 1978	(Greece) Aris	
6	Kostas Louboutis	(Greece)	LB	Thessaloniki, Greece	10 June 1979	(Greece) Levadiakos	
16	Giorgos Kolios	(Greece)	LB	Ioannina, Greece	28 April 1990	(Greece) PAS Giannina U21	
21	Panagiotis Tzimas	(Greece)	CB	Ioannina, Greece	7 January 1991	(Greece) PAS Giannina U21	
24	Giorgos Karakostas	(Greece)	CB	Stanos, Aetolia-Acarnania, Greece	23 July 1984	(Greece) Ilisiakos	
25	Alexios Michail	(Greece)	CB	Ioannina, Greece	18 August 1986	(Greece) Lamia	
32	Pavlos Vartziotis	(Greece)	CB	Ioannina, Greece	27 January 1981	(Greece) Kerkyra	
37	Giannis Stathis	(Greece)	RB	Athens, Greece	20 May 1987	(Greece) Panathinaikos	
88	Nikolaos Georgiadis	(Greece)	RB	Toronto, Canada	23 March 1983	(Greece) Kozani	
Midfielders
7	Ilias Michalopoulos	(Greece)	ML	Athens, Greece	15 October 1985	(Greece) Atromitos U-21	
8	Luciano	(Brazil) (Greece)	CM	Volta Redonda, Brazil	21 August 1972	(Greece) Atromitos	
12	Jean Marie Sylla	(Guinea)	ML	Conakry, Guinea	22 April 1983	(Greece) Apollon Kalamarias	
14	Kostas Pappas	(Greece)	CM	Ioannina, Greece	30 November 1991	(Greece) PAS Giannina U21	
17	César Castro	(Venezuela)	DM	San Cristobal, Tachira, Venezuela	10 April 1983	(Greece) Atromitos	
18	Esteban Buján	(Argentina)	DM	Capital Federal, Argentina	13 July 1979	(Argentina) CA Banfield	
20	David Meza	(Paraguay)	DM	Asunción, Paraguay	15 August 1988	(Greece) Atromitos	Loan
23	Evripidis Giakos	(Greece)	CM / CF	Ioannina, Greece	9 April 1991	(Greece) PAS Giannina U21	
27	Federico Ariel García	(Argentina) (Spain)	ML	Malagueño, Argentina	4 January 1979	(Greece) Olympiacos Volos	Loan
29	Lucas Rimoldi	(Argentina)	CM	Córdoba, Argentina	10 August 1980	(Argentina) Talleres	
99	Lucas Scaglia	(Argentina)	CM	Rosario, Argentina	6 May 1987	(Spain) Terrassa	
Forwards
9	Giorgos Saitiotis	(Greece)	FW	Chalkidiki, Greece	25 July 1981	(Greece) Niki Volos	
11	Evangelos Kontogoulidis	(Greece)	ST	Proastio, Kozani, Greece	13 July 1981	(Greece) Kozani	
19	Georgios Gougoulias	(Greece)	ST	Schweinfurt, Germany	7 February 1983	(Greece) Panserraikos	
22	Christos Tzanis	(Greece)	FW	Parapotamos, Greece	22 April 1985	(Greece) Anagennisi Arta	
77	Ilias Solakis (VC)	(Greece)	FW	Florina, Greece	15 December 1974	(Greece) Kastoria	
Left during Winter Transfer Window
18	Kostantinos Kaznaferis	(Greece)	RW	Arta, Greece	22 June 1987	(Greece) Anagennisi Arta	
10	Christos Koutsospyros	(Greece)	FW	Agrinio, Greece	14 October 1981	(Greece) Atromitos	
19	Giannis Samaras	(Greece)	RB	Kozani, Greece	26 May 1983	(Greece) Thermaikos Thermis	

=== International players ===
- (Greece) Kostas Louboutis (men's)
- (Greece) Georgios Sikalias (U-21)
- (Greece) Georgios Kousas (U-21)
- (Greece) Kostas Pagonis (U-21)

=== Foreign players ===
EU Nationals

EU Nationals (Dual Citizenship)
- (Brazil) (Greece) (Europe) Luciano
- (Argentina) (Spain) (Europe) Federico Ariel García

Non-EU Nationals
- (Argentina) Esteban Buján
- (Argentina) Lucas Rimoldi
- (Argentina) Lucas Scaglia
- (Guinea) Jean Marie Sylla
- (Venezuela) César Castro
- (Paraguay) David Meza

== Personnel ==
=== Management ===
Position	Staff
Majority Owner	Alexis Kougias (until 3 July 2008) Giorgos Christovasilis (from 3 July 2008)
President and CEO	Alexis Kougias (until 3 July 2008) Giorgos Christovasilis (from 3 July 2008)
Director of Football	Thalis Tsirimokos
Head of Ticket Department	Alekos Potsis

=== Coaching staff ===
Position	Name
Head coach	Nikos Anastopoulos (Until 3 July 2008) Ángel Guillermo Hoyos (From 10 July 2008 until 29 April 2009) Miltos Mastoras ct (From 29 April 2010 until 25 May 2009)
Assistant coach	Fernando Argila
Fitness coach	Pablo Lugitano
Goalkeepers Coach	Angel Argila

=== Medical staff ===
Position	Name
Head doctor	Spyros Siaravas
Physio	Filipos Skordos

== Transfers ==
=== Summer ===
==== In ====
No	Pos	Player	Transferred from	Fee	Date	Source
30	GK	Georgios Sikalias	Panathinaikos	-	17 July 2008	
24	CB	Giorgos Karakostas	Ilisiakos	-	17 July 2008	
37	RB	Giannis Stathis	Panathinaikos	-	19 July 2008	
6	LB	Kostas Louboutis	Levadiakos	-	19 July 2008	
17	DM	César Castro	Atromitos	-	22 July 2008	
20	DM	David Meza	Atromitos	Loan	29 July 2008	
8	CM	Luciano	Atromitos	-	5 August 2008	
29	CM	Lucas Rimoldi	Talleres	-	12 August 2008	
23	CM / CF	Evripidis Giakos	PAS Giannina U21	-		

==== Out ====
No	Pos	Player	Transferred to	Fee	Date	Source
	AM	Sotiris Tsatsos	Apollon Kalamarias	Released	25 June 2008	
	CB / DM	Paul Adado	Panserraikos	70.000	12 July 2008	
	CB	Nikos Zapropoulos	Panthrakikos	Released	14 July 2008	
	GK	Mahamadou Sidibé	Ethnikos Achna	Released	15 July 2008	
31	DM	Kostas Kiassos	Levadiakos	Released	15 July 2008	
	AMR	Aristomenis Kapouranis	PAS Lamia	Released	16 July 2008	
	DM	Alexandros Kalogeris	Keravnos Keratea	-	21 July 2008	
	CB	Apostolos Avramidis	Ethnikos Filippiada	Loan	6 August 2008	
	RW	Giorgos Lappas	Ethnikos Filippiada	Loan	14 August 2008	
20	CM	Kostas Diamantidis	Fostiras	Loan	29 August 2008	
	CM	Fillip Rodrigues	-	-		

=== Winter ===
==== In ====
No	Pos	Player	Transferred from	Fee	Date	Source
99	CM	Lucas Scaglia	Terrassa	-	13 January 2009	
18	DM	Esteban Buján	CA Banfield	-	13 January 2009	
27	ML	Federico Ariel García	Olympiacos Volos	Loan	22 January 2009	
19	ST	Georgios Gougoulias	Panserraikos	-	30 January 2009	
16	LB	Giorgos Kolios	PAS Giannina U21	Promoted	17 February 2009	
21	CB	Panagiotis Tzimas	PAS Giannina U21	Promoted	17 February 2009	
14	CM	Kostas Pappas	PAS Giannina U21	Promoted	17 February 2009	

==== Out ====
No	Pos	Player	Transferred to	Fee	Date	Source
18	RW	Kostantinos Kaznaferis	Pyrsos Grevena	Loan	6 January 2009	
10	FW	Christos Koutsospyros	Panachaiki	Loan	8 January 2009	
19	RB	Giannis Samaras	Pyrsos Grevena	Loan	16 January 2009	

== Pre-season and friendlies ==
Win Draw Loss Upcoming fixture

9 August 2008 Friendly	PAS Giannina	6-0	Marko	Metsovo
10:00				Stadium: Metsovo stadium Attendance: 400

13 August 2008 Friendly	Thesprotos	2-6	PAS Giannina	Igoumenitsa
18:30	Nikos Andriotis 5'; Gogolos 38'	Report	Tzanis 6', 29'; Michalopoulos 23'; Luciano 37'; Michail 47'; Kostas Pappas (?)	Stadium: Municipal Stadium of Igoumenitsa

21 August 2008 Friendly	Ethnikos Filippiada	1-1	PAS Giannina	Arta
	? (?)		Rimoldi (?)	Stadium: Arta Stadium

23 August 2008 Friendly	Pyrsos Grevena	3-1	PAS Giannina	Grevena
	Jelovac 14', 25'; Christos Velonis 74' (pen.)	Report	Saitiotis 11'	Stadium: DAK Grevena; Attendance: 1.000

25 August 2008 Friendly	PAS Preveza	0-0	PAS Giannina	Preveza
18:00		Report		Stadium: Athanasia Tsoumeleka Municipal Stadium; Referee: Roussos
Note: The match was interrupted on 75'.

27 August 2008 Friendly	Anagennisi Arta	1-2	PAS Giannina	Arta
18:00	Dickson Madu 2'	Report	Saitiotis 50'; Solakis 78'	Stadium: Arta Stadium; Attendance: 1.000; Referee: Konstantinos Tzouvanos

31 August 2008 Friendly	PAS Giannina	1-1	Apollon Kalamarias	Ioannina
19:00	César Castro 31'	Report	Dimitris Tsagarakis 77'	Stadium: Zosimades Stadium; Attendance: 2.000

3 September 2008 Friendly	PAS Giannina	1-2	Veria	Ioannina
18:00				Stadium: Zosimades Stadium; Attendance: 2.000

6 September 2008 Friendly	PAS Giannina	5-0	Besëlidhja Lezhë	Ioannina
	Solakis 5', 12', 14', 32'; Tzanis 68'	Report		Stadium: Zosimades Stadium; Attendance: 1.000; Referee: Dimitris Thanos

11 March 2009 Friendly	PAS Giannina	2-1	Pindos Konitsa	Ioannina
15:30				Stadium: PEAKI

== Competitions ==
=== League table ===
==== Results summary ====
Overall								Home						Away					
Pld	W	D	L	GF	GA	GD	Pts	W	D	L	GF	GA	GD	W	D	L	GF	GA	GD
34	20	9	5	70	36	+34	69	15	2	0	49	17	+32	5	7	5	21	19	+2

==== Fixtures ====
Win Draw Loss Upcoming fixture

14 September 2008 1	PAS Giannina	6-2	Ilisiakos	Ioannina
17:00	Saitiotis 4' (pen.), 66'; Luciano 11', 20'; Michalopoulos 26'; Meza (yellow card) 60'; Louboutis (yellow card) 85'; Solakis 90+3'	Report	Anastasios Pavlidis 27'; Garré (yellow card) 31'; Anastacio Reiger 90'; Paviot (yellow card) 90'	Stadium: Zosimades Stadium; Referee: Christos Apostolidis

20 September 2008 2	Kallithea	0-1	PAS Giannina	Kallithea
15:00	Luis Sarmiento (yellow card) 38'; Pavlos Moustafidis (yellow card) 89'	Report	Tzanis 3'; Dasios (yellow card) 55'; Sikalias (yellow card) 90'	Stadium: Grigoris Lambrakis Stadium; Referee: Konstantinos Vasilias

28 September 2008 3	Kastoria	1-1	PAS Giannina	Kastoria
17:00	Ekwe 45'; Iasonidis (yellow card) 88'; Nikolaos Flindris (yellow card) 90'	Report	Rimoldi (yellow card) 32'; Meza (yellow card) 42'; César Castro (yellow card) 84'; Luciano 88'; Georgiadis (yellow card) 90'	Stadium: Municipal Stadium of Kastoria; Referee: Antonis Valiotis

5 October 2008 4	PAS Giannina	2-0	Pierikos	Ioannina
16:00	Saitiotis 40' (pen.), 90'; Meza (yellow card) 55'; Sylla (yellow card) 60'; Luciano (yellow card) 73'; Sikalias (yellow card) 83'	Report	Georgios Tasidis (yellow card) 21'; Chatzopoulos (yellow card) 39'; Páez (yellow card) 55'; Dimitrios Vermpis (yellow card) 82'	Stadium: Zosimades Stadium; Referee: Andreas Pappas

12 October 2008 5	Anagennisi Karditsa	1-3	PAS Giannina	Karditsa
16:00	Doukas (yellow card) 15'; Angelos Chatzirizos 47'	Report	Luciano (yellow card) 12'; César Castro (yellow card) 13'; Solakis 61', 75', 84'	Stadium: Municipal Stadium of Karditsa; Referee: Nikolaos Athanasiou

18 October 2008 6	PAS Giannina	2-1	Atromitos	Ioannina
16:00	Saitiotis 37', 87'; César Castro (yellow card) 51'; Sikalias (yellow card) 90+1'	Report	Perrone (yellow card) 9'; Perrone 68'; Korbos (yellow card) 80'; Michailidis (yellow card) 90'; Massara (yellow card) 90'; Melissas (yellow card) 90'	Stadium: Zosimades Stadium; Referee: Apostolos Ambarkiolis

26 October 2008 7	Ionikos	1–1	PAS Giannina	Nikaia
15:00	Ikonomou (yellow card) ?' (yellow-red card) 50'; Makor 79'; González (yellow card) 90'	Report	César Castro (yellow card) 7'; Luciano (yellow card) 26'; Louboutis (yellow card) 40'; Kousas 45+2'; Rimoldi (yellow card) 80'; Saitiotis (yellow card) 81'; Georgiadis (yellow card) 85'	Stadium: Neapoli; Referee: Georgios Konstantinou

3 November 2008 8	PAS Giannina	2-1	Kerkyra	Ioannina
18:00	Vartziotis (yellow card) 19'; Saitiotis 21'; Michalopoulos 26'; Louboutis (yellow card) 26'; Tzanis (yellow card) 78'	Report	Dimitrios Gikas (yellow card) 57'; Tsemperidis (yellow card) 65'; Israel Silva 80'; Israel Silva (yellow card) 80'	Stadium: Zosimades Stadium; Referee: Thomas Kouklomenos

9 November 2008 9	Diagoras	2–0	PAS Giannina	Rhodes
	Dimitrios Tsiatsios (yellow card) 12'; Giannis Christou 58'; Panagiotis Spartalis 76'; Poulopoulos (yellow card) ?' (yellow-red card) 81'	Report	Rimoldi (yellow card) 12'; Solakis (yellow card) 24'; Louboutis (yellow card) 72'; Georgiadis (yellow card) 81'	Stadium: Diagoras Stadium; Referee: Charalampos Kalogeropoulos

15 November 2008 10	PAS Giannina	5-1	Apollon Kalamarias	Ioannina
	César Castro 4'; Dasios 30'; Solakis (yellow card) 37'; Tzanis 57'; Dasios (yellow card) 58'; Saitiotis 68'; Rimoldi (yellow card) 73'; Luciano 79'	Report	Sotiris Tsatsos 17'; Nikolaos Papadopoulos (yellow card) 34'; Souare (yellow card) 54'	Stadium: Zosimades Stadium; Referee: Athanasios Giachos

23 November 2008 11	Ethnikos Asteras	0–0	PAS Giannina	Kaisariani
	Vasilios Karatzas (yellow card) ?' (yellow-red card) 59'; Antonis Liosis (yellow card) 73'	Report	Vartziotis (yellow card) 37'; Dasios (yellow card) 57'; Solakis (yellow card) 66'	Stadium: Michalis Kritikopoulos Stadium; Referee: Konstantinos Ioannidis

30 November 2008 12	PAS Giannina	2-1	Kalamata	Ioannina
	Kousas (yellow card) 18'; Dasios (yellow card) 27'; Michalopoulos 57'; Solakis 76'	Report	Kaounos 28'; Dedes (yellow card) 59'	Stadium: Zosimades Stadium; Referee: Symeon Spyrou

7 December 2008 13	PAS Giannina	3-1	Kavala	Ioannina
	Gogolos (yellow card) 32'; Tzanis 37'; Kousas (yellow card) 39'; Saitiotis 57', 62'; Rimoldi (yellow card) 88'; Sikalias (yellow card) 90'	Report	Sapanis 3'; Kalajdžić (yellow card) 34'; Soultanidis (yellow card) 39'; Tarachulski (yellow card) 88'	Stadium: Zosimades Stadium; Referee: Thomas Kouklomenos

14 December 2008 14	Ethnikos Piraeus	0–2	PAS Giannina	Elliniko
	Zaradoukas (yellow card) 9'; Isidoros Chalimourdas (yellow card) 21'; Siligardakis (yellow card) 55'; Farinola (yellow card) ?' (yellow-red card) 67'; Kritikos (yellow card) 86'	Report	Kousas 12'; Vartziotis (yellow card) 26'; Gogolos (yellow card) 39'; César Castro (yellow card) 44'; Tzanis (yellow card) 56'; Louboutis (yellow card) 68'; Karakostas (yellow card) 83'; Solakis 88'	Stadium: Hellinikon Stadium; Referee: Dimitrios Styliaras

21 December 2008 15	PAS Giannina	1-0	Veria	Ioannina
	César Castro (red card) 28'; Meza (yellow card) 32'; Kousas (yellow card) 32'; Luciano (yellow card) 40'; Dasios 48'	Report	Alexiou (yellow card) 26'; El Halwani (yellow card) 36'; Samaras (yellow card) 44'	Stadium: Zosimades Stadium; Referee: Apostolos Ambarkiolis

4 January 2009 16	Agrotikos Asteras	2–1	PAS Giannina	Evosmos
	Lampros Chaniotis 20'; Lampros Chaniotis (yellow card) 32'; Stavros Vangelopoulos (yellow card) 41'; Vangelis Avramopoulos 88'; Vangelis Avramopoulos (yellow card) 89'; Margaritis (yellow card) ?' (yellow-red card) 89'	Report	Saitiotis 30'; Michalopoulos (yellow card) 41'; Georgiadis (yellow card) 52'; Karakostas (yellow card) 90'	Stadium: Agrotikos Asteras Stadium; Referee: Konstantinos Vasilias

11 January 2009 17	PAS Giannina	5-2	Olympiacos Volos	Ioannina
	Kousas 8'; Rimoldi (yellow card) 36'; Solakis 37', 73'; Zafiropoulos (yellow card) 49'; Rimoldi 53'; Gogolos (yellow card) 57'; Saitiotis 65'; Michalopoulos (yellow card) 79'	Report	Ioannou 19', 88'; Katsikas (yellow card) 29'; Raguel (yellow card) 50'	Stadium: Zosimades Stadium; Referee: Georgios Giannopoulos

18 January 2009 18	Ilisiakos	1–1	PAS Giannina	Aigaleo
	Omo 9'; Tsabouris (yellow card) 76'; Tabasis (yellow card) 90+4'	Report	Rimoldi (yellow card) 54'; Solakis 66'; Luciano (yellow card) 90+4'	Stadium: Stavros Mavrothalassitis Stadium; Referee: Symeon Spyrou

25 January 2009 19	PAS Giannina	8-1	Kallithea	Ioannina
	Rimoldi 8'; Solakis 10', 19', 49'; Luciano 12'; Michalopoulos 15'; Saitiotis 28'; Kousas (yellow card) 36'; Michail 77'	Report	Maroukakis 66'	Stadium: Zosimades Stadium; Referee: Efthalia Mitsi

1 February 2009 20	PAS Giannina	3-1	Kastoria	Ioannina
	Saitiotis 23'; Meza (red card) 27'; Zafiropoulos (yellow card) 27'; Solakis (yellow card) 45'; Tzanis (yellow card) 61'; Solakis 69'; Luciano 90+3'	Report	Georgios Sikalopoulos 5'; Georgios Tsoulfidis (yellow card) 24'; Stefanov (yellow card) 51'; Vasilios Chatzivasiliadis (yellow card) 71'	Stadium: Zosimades Stadium; Referee: Ioannis Kementsetsidis

8 February 2009 21	Pierikos	0–0	PAS Giannina	Katerini
	Dembélé (yellow card) 23'; Sérginho (yellow card) 45'; Páez (yellow card) 50'; Giannis Tsigiannis (yellow card) 59'; Tolios (yellow card) 69'; Gerasimos Chaikalis (yellow card) 89'	Report	Georgiadis (yellow card) 52'; Luciano (yellow card) 69'	Stadium: Katerini Stadium; Referee: Georgios Chatzis

15 February 2009 22	PAS Giannina	2-1	Anagennisi Karditsa	Ioannina
	Michail 60'; Dasios (yellow card) 81'; Gougoulias 90+1'	Report	Bletsas (yellow card) 7'; Vladan Vukovic (yellow card) 27'; Zaharievski (yellow card) 75'; Vladan Vukovic 87'; Yahaya (yellow card) 87'	Stadium: Zosimades Stadium; Referee: Konstantinos Mazarakis

21 February 2009 23	Atromitos	2–1	PAS Giannina	Athens
	Favalli (yellow card) 22'; Perrone (yellow card) 36'; Michailidis (yellow card) 40'; Massara (yellow card) 49'; Favalli 64'; Marcelo Oliveira 66'	Report	Saitiotis 40' (pen.); Luciano (yellow card) 49'; Georgiadis (yellow card) 18' (yellow-red card) 50'; Dasios (yellow card) 65'	Stadium: Peristeri Stadium; Attendance: 3.215; Referee: Evangelos Katsidonis

1 March 2009 24	PAS Giannina	2-1	Ionikos	Ioannina
	Luciano (yellow card) ?'; Kousas (yellow card) 13'; Saitiotis 19'; Rimoldi (yellow card) ?' (yellow-red card) 25'; Solakis (yellow card) 45+1'; Federico Ariel García (yellow card) 47'; Luciano 66'	Report	Siovas (yellow card) 23'; Chatzis (yellow card) 25'; Ikonomou (yellow card) 79'; Nikolaos Aposkitis 83'	Stadium: Zosimades Stadium; Referee: Dimitrios Styliaras

8 March 2009 25	Kerkyra	2–2	PAS Giannina	Kerkyra
	Gustavinho (yellow card) 32'; Israel Silva 41', 47'; Makrydimitris (yellow card) 50'; Pelagias (yellow card) 67'; Konstantinos Manousaridis (yellow card) 90'; Christos Athanasiadis (yellow card) ?' (yellow-red card) 90+5'	Report	Dasios 11', 90+5' (pen.); Kousas (yellow card) 14'; César Castro (yellow card) 42'; Georgiadis (yellow card) 45'; Dasios (yellow card) 53'; Gougoulias (yellow card) 67'	Stadium: Kerkyra Stadium; Referee: Marios Lampropoulos

15 March 2009 26	PAS Giannina	1-1	Diagoras	Ioannina
	Karakostas (yellow card) 52'; Solakis 79'; Tzanis (yellow card) 90'	Report	Triantafyllou 27'; Korakakis (yellow card) 44'; Triantafyllou (yellow card) 58'; Panagiotis Spartalis (yellow card) 87'; Minas Tzanis (yellow card) 90'	Stadium: Zosimades Stadium; Referee: Sarantos Lourmbeas

21 March 2009 27	Apollon Kalamarias	1–3	PAS Giannina	Kalamaria
	Papadopoulos (yellow card) 23'; Andreas Govas (yellow card) 42'; Giannis Papapostolou 55'	Report	Sylla (yellow card) 7'; Solakis 18'; Gogolos (yellow card) 34'; Saitiotis 35'; Solakis (yellow card) 45'; Tzanis 52'	Stadium: Kalamaria Stadium; Referee: Dimitrios Golias

29 March 2009 28	PAS Giannina	1-0	Ethnikos Asteras	Ioannina
	Saitiotis 29'; César Castro (yellow card) 45+1' (yellow-red card) 59'; Kousas (yellow card) 64'; Rimoldi (yellow card) 75'; Zafiropoulos (yellow card) 90+4'	Report	Gašpar (yellow card) 63'; Julinho (yellow card) 71'; Dimosthenis Papathanasiou (yellow card) 83'	Stadium: Zosimades Stadium; Referee: Christos Apostolidis

5 April 2009 29	Kalamata	2–1	PAS Giannina	Kalamata
	Marcelinho 4'; Pourtoulidis (yellow card) 36'; Manolis Spyridakis (yellow card) ?' (yellow-red card) 50'; Pourtoulidis 65' (pen.); Brilakis (yellow card) 89'; Georgios Kalomiris (yellow card) 90'	Report	Buján (yellow card) 26'; Rimoldi (red card) 53'; Zafiropoulos (yellow card) 65'; Kousas (yellow card) 88'; Saitiotis 90' (pen.)	Stadium: Kalamata Municipal Stadium; Referee: Andreas Pappas

13 April 2009 30	Kavala	2–1	PAS Giannina	Kavala
	Kagiouzis 43' (pen.); Nikos Tsimplidis (yellow card) 48'; Peña 58'; Peña (yellow card) 63'; Tarachulski (yellow card) 66'; Sapanis (yellow card) 77'; Petkakis (yellow card) 88'	Report	Pagonis (yellow card) 28'; Buján (yellow card) 30'; Athanasios Kouventaris (yellow card) 43'; Gogolos (yellow card) 49'; Gougoulias (yellow card) 52'; César Castro (yellow card) 59'; Gougoulias 82'; Federico Ariel García (yellow card) 85'	Stadium: Anthi Karagianni Stadium; Referee: Michalis Dakos

27 April 2009 31	PAS Giannina	2-1	Ethnikos Piraeus	Ioannina
	Buján (yellow card) 12'; Buján 27'; Solakis 74'; Karakostas (red card) 85'; Kontogoulidis (yellow card) 89'	Report	Ferreira 4'; Zapropoulos (yellow card) 13'; Isidoros Chalimourdas (yellow card) 55'; Siligardakis (yellow card) 70'	Stadium: Zosimades Stadium; Referee: Athanasios Giachos

4 May 2009 32	Veria	1–2	PAS Giannina	Veria
	Samaras 50'; Alexiou (yellow card) 65'; Georgios Papadopoulos (yellow card) 86'	Report	Solakis 17'; Gogolos (yellow card) 20'; Michalopoulos 69'	Stadium: Veria Stadium; Referee: Georgios Giannopoulos

11 May 2009 33	PAS Giannina	2-2	Agrotikos Asteras	Ioannina
	Kousas 38'; Saitiotis 67'; Georgiadis (yellow card) 59'; Michail (yellow card) 86'	Report	Radivoje Jevdjovic 14', 30'; Chasiotis (yellow card) 42'; Giakoumis (yellow card) 75'	Stadium: Zosimades Stadium; Referee: Nikolaos Athanasiou

18 May 2009 34	Olympiacos Volos	1–1	PAS Giannina	Volos
	Aristidis Michalis 46'; Efthymios Gousoulis (yellow card) 77'; Lampros Chaniotis (yellow card) ?' (yellow-red card) 90'	Report	Giakos 35'; Michail (yellow card) 54'	Stadium: Volos Municipal Stadium; Referee: Ioannis Kementsetsidis

=== Greek cup ===
==== Second round ====
17 September 2008	Niki Volos	1–2 (a.e.t.)	PAS Giannina	Volos
	Christos Kanellopoulos 72'; Anastasios Choustoulakis (yellow card) ?'; Michalis Koutsogiannis (yellow card) ?'; Fotis Tsekitsidis (yellow card) ?'; Rodrigo Bengua (yellow card) ?'; Antonis Sotrinis (yellow card) ?'	Report	Solakis 64'; Tzanis 97'; Meza (yellow card) ?'	Stadium: Panthessaliko Stadium; Referee: Praxitelis Zacharidis

==== Additional round ====
24 September 2008	Kerkyra	3–0	PAS Giannina	Corfu
17:30	Tsemperidis 37'; Silva 45'; Michalis Giannitsakis 55'; Michalis Giannitsakis (yellow card) ?'	Report	Solakis (yellow card) ?'; Meza (yellow card) ?'; Michail (yellow card) ?'; Pagonis (yellow card) ?'	Stadium: Kerkyra Stadium; Referee: Giorgos Chatzis
