= 2008–09 Greek Football Cup =

2008–09 Greek Cup
Tournament details
- Country: Greece
- Dates: 30 August 2008 – 2 May 2009
- Teams: 70

Final positions
- Champions: Olympiacos (24th title)
- Runners-up: AEK Athens

Tournament statistics
- Matches played: 79
- Goals scored: 181 (2.29 per match)
- Top goal scorer(s): Ismael Blanco (5 goals)

The 2008–09 Greek Football Cup was the 67th edition of the Greek Football Cup. The competition started on 30 August 2008 with the first round and concluded on 2 May 2009 with the final, held at Olympic Stadium.

Olympiacos claimed that season's Greek Cup, after a 4–4 draw and a 15–14 victory on penalties over AEK Athens and was considered by fans as the most entertaining final in the tournament.

== Calendar ==
Round	Date(s)	Fixtures	Clubs	New entries	Leagues entering
First Round	30, 31 August & 7 September 2008	18	70 → 52	36	Gamma Ethniki
Second Round	16–18 September 2008	18	52 → 34	18	Beta Ethniki
Additional Round	24 September 2008	2	34 → 32	none	none
Round of 32	28–30 October, 11–13 November 2008	16	32 → 16	16	Super League
Round of 16	13–15, 20–22, 28 January 2009	12	16 → 8	none	none
Quarter-finals	4, 18, 25 February & 4 March 2009	8	8 → 4	none	none
Semi-finals	18 March & 8, 9 April 2009	4	4 → 2	none	none
Final	2 May 2009	1	2 → 1	none	none

== Knockout phase ==
Each tie in the knockout phase, apart from the quarter-finals and the semi-finals, was played by a single match. If the score was level at the end of normal time, extra time was played, followed by a penalty shoot-out if the score was still level. In the quarter-finals and the semi-finals were played over two legs, with each team playing one leg at home. The team that scored more goals on aggregate over the two legs advanced to the next round. If the aggregate score was level, the away goals rule was applied, i.e. the team that scored more goals away from home over the two legs advanced. If away goals were also equal, then extra time was played. The away goals rule was again applied after extra time, i.e. if there were goals scored during extra time and the aggregate score was still level, the visiting team advanced by virtue of more away goals scored. If no goals were scored during extra time, the winners were decided by a penalty shoot-out. In the round of 16, if the score was level at the end of normal time the two-legged rule was applied.
The mechanism of the draws for each round is as follows:

- In the draw for the second round, the teams from the second division are seeded and the winners from the first round were unseeded. The seeded teams are drawn against the unseeded teams.
- In the draw for the Round of 32 onwards, the teams from the first division are seeded and the winners from the previous rounds were unseeded. The seeded teams are drawn against the unseeded teams.
- In the draws for the Round of 16 onwards, there are no seedings and teams from the different group can be drawn against each other.

== First round ==
The draw took place on 18 August 2008.

=== Summary ===
Team 1	Score	Team 2
30 August 2008
Hersonissos	1–2	Zakynthos
Anagennisi Arta	0–1	Rodos
Koropi	0–0 (4–3 p)	Eordaïkos 2007
Aiolikos	0–1	Lamia
Chaidari	1–0	Thermaikos
Odysseas Anagennisi	3–2	Keravnos
Makedonikos	4–2	Anagennisi Giannitsa
Vyzas	1–0	Ethnikos Filippiada
31 August 2008
Pyrsos	0–0 (4–3 p)	Agios Dimitrios
Korinthos	3–0	Ethnikos Katerini
Neos Asteras Rethymno	1–1 (4–5 p)	Neoi Epivates
Niki Volos	2–0	Preveza
Aias Salamina	0–1	Ilioupoli
Agia Paraskevi	0–1	Fokikos
Panetolikos	3–0	Atsalenios
Egaleo	0–3	Panachaïki 2005
Fostiras	0–0 (5–4 p)	Panargiakos
Doxa Dramas	3–0	Alexandroupoli Enosi

=== Matches ===
30 August 2008
13:00 EEST

Hersonissos	1–2	Zakynthos
Foukarakis 69'	Report	Carlos 14', 39'

Hersonissos Municipal Stadium, Hersonissos
Referee: Ioannis Binichakis (Lasithi)

30 August 2008
13:00 EEST

Anagennisi Arta	0–1	Rodos
	Report	Argentis 8'

Arta Stadium, Arta
Referee: Thanasis Bortzaris (Achaia)

30 August 2008
13:00 EEST

Koropi	0–0 (a.e.t.)	Eordaïkos 2007
	Report
Penalties
	4–3

Antonis Priftis Stadium, Koropi
Referee: Anastasios Papadrianopoulos (Piraeus)

30 August 2008
13:00 EEST

Aiolikos	0–1	Lamia
	Report	Pelekis 30' (o.g.)

Municipal Stadium of Mytilene, Mytilene
Referee: Sifis Sfakianakis (Athens)

30 August 2008
13:00 EEST

Chaidari	1–0	Thermaikos
Gravanis 81'	Report

Chaidari Municipal Stadium, Chaidari
Referee: Pantelis Chondropoulos (Athens)

30 August 2008
13:00 EEST

Odysseas Anagennisi	3–2	Keravnos
Kenan 34'; Leonidas 63'; Salmas 38'	Report	Kontogiannidis 17'; Panakoulias 90'

Anagennisi Municipal Stadium, Serres
Referee: Dilgerakis (Drama)

30 August 2008
13:00 EEST

Makedonikos	4–2	Anagennisi Giannitsa
Dimitriadis 5', 83'; Klokidis 21'; Kalogeridis 73'	Report	Leptokarydis 34', 60'

Makedonikos Stadium, Thessaloniki
Referee: Christos Fragakis (Kavala)

30 August 2008
13:00 EEST

Vyzas	1–0	Ethnikos Filippiada
Pappas 28'	Report

Megara Stadium, Megara
Referee: Eleni Kyriou (Arcadia)

31 August 2008
13:00 EEST

Pyrsos	0–0 (a.e.t.)	Agios Dimitrios
	Report
Penalties
	4–3

Grevena Municipal Stadium, Grevena
Referee: Charalampos Selemidis (Pella)

31 August 2008
13:00 EEST

Korinthos	3–0	Ethnikos Katerini
Bashov 70'; Kafantaris 87'; Siokos 90'	Report

Municipal Stadium of Corinth, Corinth
Referee: Nikolaos Anousos (Laconia)

31 August 2008
13:00 EEST

Neos Asteras Rethymno	1–1 (a.e.t.)	Neoi Epivates
Jelic 74'	Report	Gesios 69'
Penalties
Kozanidis (penalty scored); Tamamis (penalty scored); Mikropoulos (penalty scored); Christoulakis (penalty scored); Petrakis (penalty missed)	4–5	(penalty scored) Seretis; (penalty scored) Kotsou; (penalty scored) Golebjesky; (penalty scored) Gesios; (penalty scored) Blithikiotis

Sochora Stadium, Rethymno
Referee: F. Liandrakis (Heraklion)

31 August 2008
13:00 EEST

Niki Volos	2–0	Preveza
Kanellopoulos 3'; Voulgaris 75'	Report

Pantelis Magoulas Stadium, Volos
Referee: Markos Zabetakis (Thessaloniki)

31 August 2008
13:00 EEST

Aias Salamina	0–1	Ilioupoli
	Report	Nikopoulos 79'

Municipal Stadium of Salamina, Salamina
Referee: Kostas Konstantakis (Achaia)

31 August 2008
13:00 EEST

Agia Paraskevi	0–1	Fokikos
	Report	Bris 79'

Agia Paraskevi Municipal Stadium, Agia Paraskevi
Referee: Lampariou (Piraeus)

31 August 2008
13:00 EEST

Panetolikos	3–0	Atsalenios
Zouroudis 4'; Pawela 60'; Manikas 88'	Report

Panetolikos Stadium, Agrinio
Referee: Armakolas Sideris (Athens)

31 August 2008
13:00 EEST

Egaleo	0–3	Panachaïki 2005
	Report	Caballero 1'; Papoutsis 30' (pen.); Kotarelas 37'

Stavros Mavrothalassitis Stadium, Egaleo
Referee: Vasilis Athenasopoulos (Argolida)

31 August 2008
13:00 EEST

Fostiras	0–0 (a.e.t.)	Panargiakos
	Report
Penalties
	5–4

Tavros Stadium, Tavros
Referee: Christos Koulis (Elis)

31 August 2008
13:00 EEST

Doxa Drama	3–0	Alexandroupoli Enosi
Andreev 10'; Tsoukalas 18', 90'	Report

Drama Municipal Stadium, Drama
Referee: Alexandros Katsikogiannis (Thessaloniki)

== Second round ==
The draw took place on 18 August 2008, after the first-round draw.

=== Summary ===
Team 1	Score	Team 2
16 September 2008
Pyrsos	1–4	Kallithea
Fokikos	0–1	Kerkyra
17 September 2008
Zakynthos	2–1	Pierikos
Korinthos	1–2 (a.e.t.)	Ethnikos Piraeus
Rodos	0–1	Kavala
Doxa Dramas	1–2 (a.e.t.)	Agrotikos Asteras
Koropi	0–0 (3–2 p)	Ionikos
Neoi Epivates	0–0 (3–4 p)	Ilisiakos
Niki Volos	1–2 (a.e.t.)	PAS Giannina
Lamia	2–1 (a.e.t.)	Kalamata
Odysseas Anagennisi	0–2	Ethnikos Asteras
Ilioupoli	2–2 (3–5 p)	Apollon Kalamarias
Panetolikos	1–1 (4–2 p)	Olympiacos Volos
Panachaïki 2005	0–4	Kastoria
Fostiras	1–3 (a.e.t.)	Atromitos
Vyzas	0–1	Diagoras
18 September 2008
Chaidari	2–2 (1–4 p)	Veria
Makedonikos	2–1	Anagennisi Karditsa

=== Matches ===
16 September 2008
13:00 EEST

Pyrsos	1–4	Kallithea
Georgiou 23'	Report	Markovski 25', 52' (pen.); Velonis 44'; Pararas 57'

Grevena Municipal Stadium, Grevena
Referee: Nikos Athanasiou (Thesprotia)

16 September 2008
13:00 EEST

Fokikos	0–1	Kerkyra
	Report	Silva 75'

Amfissa Municipal Stadium, Amfissa
Referee: Giorgos Konstantinou (Aetoloacarnania)

17 September 2008
13:00 EEST

Zakynthos	2–1	Pierikos
Tepetas 2'; Silvan 52'	Report	Taisidis 72'

Zakynthians Olympic Champions Ground, Zakynthos
Referee: Giannis Delfakis (Arcadia)

17 September 2008
13:00 EEST

Korinthos	1–2 (a.e.t.)	Ethnikos Piraeus
Siokos 86'	Report	Lopes 64'; Kantimoiris 98'

Municipal Stadium of Corinth, Corinth
Referee: Charalampos Kalogeropoulos (Athens)

17 September 2008
13:00 EEST

Rodos	0–1	Kavala
	Report	Kalajdžić 42' (pen.)

Diagoras Stadium, Rhodes
Referee: D. Panagopoulos (Athens)

17 September 2008
13:00 EEST

Doxa Dramas	1–2 (a.e.t.)	Agrotikos Asteras
Mitsopoulos 47'	Report	Kyzeridis 90+'; Dinopapas 119'

Drama Municipal Stadium, Drama
Referee: Christos Ioannidis (Serres)

17 September 2008
13:00 EEST

Koropi	0–0 (a.e.t.)	Ionikos
	Report
Penalties
	3–2

Antonis Priftis Stadium, Koropi
Referee: Giorgos Tzovaras (Phthiotis)

17 September 2008
13:00 EEST

Neoi Epivates	0–0 (a.e.t.)	Ilisiakos
	Report
Penalties
	3–4

Neoi Epivates Stadium, Neoi Epivates
Referee: Dimitris Golias (Thessaly)

17 September 2008
13:00 EEST

Niki Volos	1–2 (a.e.t.)	PAS Giannina
Kanellopoulos 72'	Report	Solakis 64'; Tzanis 97'

Panthessaliko Stadium, Volos
Referee: Praxitelis Zacharidis (Macedonia)

17 September 2008
13:00 EEST

Lamia	2–1 (a.e.t.)	Kalamata
Garrasino 56'; Lamprogeorgos 120'	Report	Konstantopoulos 71'

Lamia Municipal Stadium, Lamia
Referee: Anastasios Papadriopoulos (Piraeus)

17 September 2008
13:00 EEST

Odysseas Anagennisi	0–2	Ethnikos Asteras
	Report	Matsoukas 32'; Gatsis 49'

Anagennisi Municipal Stadium, Serres
Referee: Kostas Konstantinidis (Kavala)

17 September 2008
13:00 EEST

Ilioupoli	2–2 (a.e.t.)	Apollon Kalamarias
Alexandropoulos 38'; Rousakis 69'	Report	Lanaris 58'; Souare 68'
Penalties
	3–5

Ilioupoli Municipal Stadium, Ilioupoli
Referee: Giorgos Daskalopoulos (Corinthia)

17 September 2008
13:00 EEST

Panetolikos	1–1 (a.e.t.)	Olympiacos Volos
Chrysafis 90+'	Report	Ioannou 31'
Penalties
	4–2

Panetolikos Stadium, Agrinio
Referee: Dimitris Thanos (Epirus)

17 September 2008
13:00 EEST

Panachaïki 2005	0–4	Kastoria
	Report	Iasonidis 31'; Halimi 52'; Chatzivasiliadis 73'; Kontos 77'

Kostas Davourlis Stadium, Patras
Referee: Michalis Tsiniaris (Athens)

17 September 2008
13:00 EEST

Fostiras	1–3 (a.e.t.)	Atromitos
Zacharopoulos 61'	Report	Kalantzis 76'; Perrone 99', 120'

Tavros Stadium, Tavros
Referee: G. Kandris (West Attica)

17 September 2008
13:00 EEST

Vyzas	0–1	Diagoras
	Report	Milošković 8'

Megara Stadium, Megara
Referee: Stavros Mantalos (Athens)

18 September 2008
13:00 EEST

Chaidari	2–2 (a.e.t.)	Veria
Melabianakis 9' (o.g.); Kantiou 37'	Report	Krivokapić 29'; Gavrilopoulos 52'
Penalties
	1–4

Chaidari Municipal Stadium, Chaidari
Referee: Giorgos Segos (Euboea)

18 September 2008
13:00 EEST

Makedonikos	2–1	Anagennisi Karditsa
Klokidis 24' (pen.), 55'	Report	Kyparissis 90'

Makedonikos Stadium, Thessaloniki
Referee: Alexandros Aretopoulos (Karditsa)

== Additional round ==
=== Summary ===
Team 1	Score	Team 2
Koropi	1–2	Atromitos
Kerkyra	3–0	PAS Giannina

=== Matches ===
24 September 2008
13:00 EEST

Koropi	1–2	Atromitos
Bounas 43'	Report	Nikolopoulos 35'; Perrone 59'

Antonis Priftis Stadium, Koropi
Referee: Periklis Giolias (Athens)

24 September 2008
13:00 EEST

Kerkyra	3–0	PAS Giannina
Tsemperidis 37'; Silva 45'; Giannitsakis 55'	Report

Kerkyra Stadium, Corfu
Referee: Giorgos Chatzis (West Attica)

== Bracket ==
Round of 32
Ethnikos Asteras	0
Ergotelis	2
Kallithea	1
Skoda Xanthi	3
Ilisiakos	1
AEK Athens	2
Kerkyra	0(4)
Levadiakos	0(2)
Lamia	1
Panserraïkos	2
Panetolikos	0
AEL	2
Zakynthos	0
Panthrakikos (a.e.t.)	2
Kavala	0
Panathinaïkos	3
Veria	3
Thrasyvoulos	1
Ethnikos Piraeus	0
Panionios	2
Apollon Kalamarias	0
Asteras Tripolis	1
Kastoria	2
Iraklis (a.e.t.)	3
Makedonikos	1
PAOK	2
Atromitos	1
Aris	2
Agrotikos Asteras	1
OFI	2
Diagoras	2
Olympiacos	3

Round of 16
Ergotelis	0
Skoda Xanthi	3
AEK Athens	1
Kerkyra	0
Panserraïkos	1
AEL	0
Panthrakikos	0
Panathinaïkos	4
Veria	0	0	0
Panionios	0	2	2
Asteras Tripolis	2
Iraklis	0
PAOK (p)	0	0	0(9)
Aris	0	0	0(8)
OFI	0
Olympiacos	2

Quarter-finals
Skoda Xanthi	2	1	2
AEK Athens (a)	1	0	2
Panserraïkos	3	0	3
Panathinaïkos	1	0	1
Panionios	0	0	0
Asteras Tripolis	1	1	2
PAOK	1	0	1
Olympiacos (a.e.t.)	0	2	2

Semi-finals
AEK Athens	3	0	3
Panserraikos	1	0	1
Asteras Tripolis	2	1	3
Olympiacos	2	2	4

Final
AEK Athens	4(14)
Olympiacos (p)	4(15)

== Round of 32 ==
The draw took place on 18 August 2008.

=== Summary ===
Team 1	Score	Team 2
Zakynthos	0–2 (a.e.t.)	Panthrakikos
Kallithea	1–3	Skoda Xanthi
Ethnikos Piraeus	0–2	Panionios
Kavala	0–3	Panathinaïkos
Agrotikos Asteras	1–2	OFI
Ilisiakos	1–2 (a.e.t.)	AEK Athens
Lamia	1–2	Panserraïkos
Veria	3–1	Thrasyvoulos
Ethnikos Asteras	0–2	Ergotelis
Apollon Kalamarias	0–1	Asteras Tripolis
Makedonikos	1–2	PAOK
Panetolikos	0–2	AEL
Kastoria	2–3 (a.e.t.)	Iraklis
Diagoras	2–3	Olympiacos
Atromitos	1–2	Aris
Kerkyra	0–0 (4–2 p)	Levadiakos

=== Matches ===
28 October 2008
14:15 EET

Zakynthos	0–2 (a.e.t.)	Panthrakikos
	Report	Bevacqua 96'; Ponce 104' (pen.)

Zakynthians Olympic Champions Ground, Zakynthos
Referee: Christoforos Zografos (Athens)

12 November 2008
14:45 EET

Kallithea	1–3	Skoda Xanthi
Rizogiannis 44' (o.g.)	Report	Quintana 16'; Poy 36'; Agali 85'

Grigoris Lambrakis Stadium, Kallithea
Attendance: 325
Referee: Ilias Spathas (Piraeus)

29 October 2008
14:45 EET

Ethnikos Piraeus	0–2	Panionios
	Report	Kumordzi 41'; Barkoglou 75'

Elliniko Stadium, Ellinikon
Attendance: 436
Referee: Giorgos Daloukas (Thessaly)

12 November 2008
19:00 EET

Kavala	0–3	Panathinaïkos
	Report	Rukavina 9', 70'; Christodoulopoulos 89'

Anthi Karagianni Stadium, Kavala
Referee: Giannis Stavridis (Pieria)

12 November 2008
14:15 EET

Agrotikos Asteras	1–2	OFI
Ador 28'	Report	Gerber 14', 59'

Agrotikos Asteras Ground, Thessaloniki
Referee: Michalis Ntakos (Xanthi)

11 November 2008
19:00 EET

Ilisiakos	1–2 (a.e.t.)	AEK Athens
Tsitsomitsos 99'	Report	Blanco 94'; Kafes 106'

Stavros Mavrothalassitis Stadium, Egaleo
Attendance: 499
Referee: Petros Konstantineas (Messinia)

12 November 2008
15:00 EET

Lamia	1–2	Panserraïkos
Papoulis 77'	Report	Badea 57'; Georgiadis 88' (pen.)

Lamia Municipal Stadium, Lamia
Referee: Lazaros Polatian (Pella)

12 November 2008
15:00 EET

Veria	3–1	Thrasyvoulos
El Halwani 46', 54'; Gelson 69'	Report	Chloros 34'

Veria Stadium, Veria
Referee: Dimitris Kyrkos (Epirus)

12 November 2008
17:00 EET

Ethnikos Asteras	0–2	Ergotelis
	Report	Rogério 61' (pen.), 90'

Michalis Kritikopoulos Stadium, Kaisariani
Attendance: 263
Referee: Michalis Lambropoulos (Elis)

30 October 2008
15:00 EET

Apollon Kalamarias	0–1	Asteras Tripolis
	Report	Cesarec 77'

Kalamaria Stadium, Thessaloniki
Attendance: 302
Referee: Nathanail Charalabidis (Kavala)

28 October 2008
17:45 EET

Makedonikos	1–2	PAOK
Klokidis 6'	Report	Bakayoko 3', 45'

Makedonikos Stadium, Thessaloniki
Referee: Giorgos Kastanidis (Thessaloniki)

29 October 2008
14:15 EET

Panetolikos	0–2	AEL
	Report	Parra 77', 80'

Panetolikos Stadium, Agrinio
Referee: Michalis Germanakos (Athens)

13 November 2008
15:00 EET

Kastoria	2–3 (a.e.t.)	Iraklis
Papadopoulos 82'; Chatzivasiliadis 89'	Report	Papasterianos 42'; Giantsis 71'; Ioannidis 93'

Municipal Stadium of Kastoria, Kastoria
Referee: Ilias Mazarakos (Arta)

29 October 2008
16:50 EET

Diagoras	2–3	Olympiacos
Triantafyllou 30', 67'	Report	Óscar 14'; Diogo 68'; Kovačeviċ 84'

Diagoras Stadium, Rhodes
Referee: Giorgos Stathopoulos (Achaia)

12 November 2008
16:45 EET

Atromitos	1–2	Aris
Kripintiris 89'	Report	Calvo 56'; Javito 80'

Peristeri Stadium, Peristeri
Attendance: 1,325
Referee: Vangelis Katsidonis (Dodecanese)

12 November 2008
16:30 EET

Kerkyra	0–0 (a.e.t.)	Levadiakos
	Report
Penalties
Kolotouros (penalty scored); Tsemperidis (penalty scored); Silva (penalty scored); Gustavinho (penalty scored)	4–2	(penalty missed) Bushi; (penalty missed) Emeran; (penalty scored) Georgiev; (penalty scored) Dimbala

Kerkyra Stadium, Corfu
Referee: Giorgos Giannopoulos (Athens)

== Round of 16 ==
The draw took place on 19 November 2008.

=== Summary ===
Team 1	Score/Agg.	Team 2	Match	Replay
Ergotelis	0–3	Skoda Xanthi		
Veria	0–2	Panionios	0–0	0–2
Panthrakikos	0–4	Panathinaïkos		
Panserraïkos	1–0	AEL		
PAOK	0–0	Aris	0–0	0–0 (9–8 p)
OFI	0–2	Olympiacos		
AEK Athens	1–0	Kerkyra		
Asteras Tripolis	2–0	Iraklis		

=== Matches ===
15 January 2009
16:45 EET

Ergotelis	0–3	Skoda Xanthi
	Report	Júnior 51' (o.g.); Agali 69'; Taïder 90'

Pankritio Stadium, Heraklion
Referee: Ilias Mazarakos (Arta)

13 January 2009
16:45 EET

Veria	0–0	Panionios
	Report

Veria Stadium, Veria
Referee: Dimitris Kalopoulos (Thessaloniki)

14 January 2009
18:45 EET

Panthrakikos	0–4	Panathinaïkos
	Report	Rukavina 18'; Gabriel 57'; Cleyton 74'; Christodoulopoulos 77'

Komotini Municipal Stadium, Komotini
Referee: Giorgos Daloukas (Thessaly)

21 January 2009
16:45 EET

Panserraïkos	1–0	AEL
Gourtsas 79'	Report

Serres Municipal Stadium, Serres
Referee: Dimitris Kalopoulos (Thessaloniki)

14 January 2009
21:10 EET

PAOK	0–0	Aris
	Report

Toumba Stadium, Thessaloniki
Attendance: 14,870
Referee: Anastasios Kakos (Corfu)

21 January 2009
20:00 EET

OFI	0–2	Olympiacos
	Report	Belluschi 69'; Galetti 85'

Theodoros Vardinogiannis Stadium, Heraklion
Attendance: 4,102
Referee: Anastasios Kakos (Corfu)

22 January 2009
16:45 EET

AEK Athens	1–0	Kerkyra
Scocco 89'	Report

Olympic Stadium, Marousi
Attendance: 4,315
Referee: Christoforos Zografos (Athens)

20 January 2009
16:45 EET

Asteras Tripolis	2–0	Iraklis
Stratakis 71'; Argyropoulos 90'	Report

Asteras Tripolis Stadium, Tripoli
Attendance: 2,362
Referee: Vasilis Paboridis (Kilkis)

==== Replay ====
28 January 2009
17:30 EET

Panionios	2–0	Veria
Kumordzi 41'; Recoba 77'	Report

Nea Smyrni Stadium, Nea Smyrni
Attendance: 772
Referee: Kyros Vassaras (Thessaloniki)

28 January 2009
21:00 EET

Aris	0–0 (a.e.t.)	PAOK
	Report
Penalties
Cámpora (penalty scored); Calvo (penalty scored); Battión (penalty scored); Vitolo (penalty missed); Lembo (penalty scored); Jahić (penalty scored); N. García (penalty scored); Neto (penalty scored); Koke (penalty scored); Karabelas (penalty missed)	8–9	(penalty scored) Muslimović; (penalty scored) Lino; (penalty scored) Bizera; (penalty missed) Sorlin; (penalty scored) Verón; (penalty scored) Marcos António; (penalty scored) Darlas; (penalty scored) Malezas; (penalty scored) Balafas; (penalty scored) Athanasiadis

Kleanthis Vikelidis Stadium, Thessaloniki
Attendance: 12,444
Referee: Vasilis Paboridis (Kilkis)

== Quarter-finals ==
The draw took place on 26 January 2009.

=== Summary ===
Team 1	Agg.	Team 2	1st leg	2nd leg
PAOK	1–2	Olympiacos	1–0	0–2 (a.e.t.)
Skoda Xanthi	2–2 (a)	AEK Athens	2–1	0–1
Panionios	0–2	Asteras Tripolis	0–1	0–1
Panserraïkos	3–2	Panathinaïkos	0–0	3–2

=== Matches ===
4 February 2009
21:15 EET

PAOK	1–0	Olympiacos
Sérgio Conceição 30'	Report

Toumba Stadium, Thessaloniki
Attendance: 21,043
Referee: Anastasios Kakos (Corfu)
4 March 2009
21:15 EET

Olympiacos	2–0 (a.e.t.)	PAOK
Diogo 46'; Derbyshire 110'	Report

Karaiskakis Stadium, Piraeus
Attendance: 23,983
Referee: Michael Koukoulakis (Heraklion)

Olympiacos won 2–1 on aggregate.

18 February 2009
21:30 EET

Skoda Xanthi	2–1	AEK Athens
Abrahám 43'; Došek 68'	Report	Blanco 5' (pen.)

Skoda Xanthi Arena, Xanthi
Attendance: 2,449
Referee: Giorgos Stathopoulos (Achaia)
25 February 2009
19:00 EET

AEK Athens	1–0	Skoda Xanthi
Blanco 83'	Report

Olympic Stadium, Marousi
Attendance: 6,480
Referee: Giannis Stavridis (Pieria)

AEK Athens won on away goals.

18 February 2009
16:45 EET

Panionios	0–1	Asteras Tripolis
	Report	Kaounos 86'

Nea Smyrni Stadium, Nea Smyrni
Attendance: 994
Referee: Michalis Lambropoulos (Elis)
4 March 2009
16:00 EET

Asteras Tripolis	1–0	Panionios
Bastía 35'	Report

Asteras Tripolis Stadium, Tripoli
Attendance: 2,550
Referee: Dimitris Kyrkos (Epirus)

Asteras Tripolis won 2–0 on aggregate.

4 February 2009
19:00 EET

Panserraïkos	0–0	Panathinaïkos
	Report

Serres Stadium, Serres
Attendance: 2,319
Referee: Christoforos Zografos (Athens)
4 March 2009
19:00 EET

Panathinaikos	2–3	Panserraikos
Christodoulopoulos 74'; Papazoglou 93' (o.g.)	Report	Baykara 23'; Čeh 56' (pen.), 71'

Olympic Stadium, Marousi
Attendance: 6,354
Referee: Giorgos Giannopoulos (Athens)

Panserraikos won 3–2 on aggregate.

== Semi-finals ==
The draw took place on 26 January 2009, after the quarter-final draw.

=== Summary ===
Team 1	Agg.	Team 2	1st leg	2nd leg
AEK Athens	3–1	Panserraikos	3–1	0–0
Asteras Tripolis	3–4	Olympiacos	2–2	1–2

=== Matches ===
18 March 2009
19:00 EET

AEK Athens	3–1	Panserraikos
Djebbour 20', 40'; Majstorović 38'	Report	Aurélio 24'

Olympic Stadium, Marousi
Attendance: 7,642
Referee: Nathanail Charalabidis (Kavala)
8 April 2009
17:00 EEST

Panserraikos	0–0	AEK Athens
	Report

Stadium of Serres, Serres
Attendance: 5,000
Referee: Giorgos Kastanidis (Thessaloniki)

AEK Athens won 3–1 on aggregate.

18 March 2009
21:15 EET

Asteras Tripolis	2–2	Olympiacos
Filomeno 30', 35'	Report	Diogo 43', 73'

Asteras Tripolis Stadium, Tripoli
Referee: Dimitris Kalopoulos (Thessaloniki)
9 April 2009
18:00 EEST

Olympiacos	2–1	Asteras Tripolis
Leto 47'; Diogo 62'	Report	Cesarec 39'

Karaiskakis Stadium, Piraeus
Referee: Giorgos Daloukas (Thessaly)

Olympiacos won 4–3 on aggregate.

== Final ==
2 May 2009
20:30 EEST

AEK Athens	4–4 (a.e.t.)	Olympiacos
Blanco 4', 8'; Scocco 90', 107'	Report	Derbyshire 47', 90+6'; Dudu 72'; Galletti 102'
Penalties
Kafes (penalty scored); Blanco (penalty scored); Scocco (penalty scored); Edinho (penalty scored); Majstorović (penalty missed); Nsaliwa (penalty scored); Saja (penalty scored); Pelletieri (penalty scored); Georgeas (penalty missed); Kafes (penalty scored); Blanco (penalty scored); Scocco (penalty scored); Edinho (penalty scored); Majstorović (penalty scored); Nsaliwa (penalty scored); Saja (penalty scored); Pelletieri (penalty missed)	14–15	(penalty scored) Óscar; (penalty scored) Dudu; (penalty scored) Diogo; (penalty scored) Domi; (penalty missed) Đorđević; (penalty scored) Torosidis; (penalty scored) Belluschi; (penalty scored) Nikopolidis; (penalty missed) Antzas; (penalty scored) Óscar; (penalty scored) Dudu; (penalty scored) Diogo; (penalty scored) Domi; (penalty scored) Đorđević; (penalty scored) Torosidis; (penalty scored) Belluschi; (penalty scored) Nikopolidis

Olympic Stadium, Marousi
Attendance: 48,594
Referee: Anastasios Kakos (Corfu)

== Top scorers ==
Rank	Player	Club	Goals
1	(Argentina) Ismael Blanco	AEK Athens	5
1	(Brazil) Diogo	Olympiacos	5
3	(Greece) Michalis Klokidis	Makedonikos	4
3	(Greece) Lazaros Christodoulopoulos	Panathinaikos	4
5	(Argentina) Emanuel Perrone	Atromitos	3
5	(Brazil) Gilvan Carlos	Zakynthos	3
5	(England) Matt Derbyshire	Olympiacos	3
5	(Croatia) Ante Rukavina	Panathinaikos	3
5	(Argentina) Ignacio Scocco	AEK Athens	3
10	(Greece) Pavlos Leptokaridis	Anagennisi Giannitsa	2
10	(Germany) Fabian Gerber	OFI	2
10	(Serbia) Marko Markovski	Kallithea	2
10	(Slovenia) Nastja Čeh	Panserraikos	2
10	(Greece) Anastasios Triantafyllou	Diagoras	2
10	(Greece) Christos Kanellopoulos	Niki Volos	2
10	(Greece) Ilias Siokos	Korinthos	2
10	(Brazil) Rogério Martins	Ergotelis	2
10	(Argentina) Facundo Parra	AEL	2
10	(Greece) Vasilios Chatzivasiliadis	Kastoria	2
10	(Croatia) Danijel Cesarec	Asteras Tripolis	2
10	(Greece) Stavros Tsoukalas	Doxa Drama	2
10	(Nigeria) Victor Agali	Skoda Xanthi	2
10	(Egypt) Amr El Halwani	Veria	2
10	(Greece) Petros Dimitriadis	Makedonikos	2
10	(Greece) Ilias Manikas	Panetolikos	2
10	(Ivory Coast) Ibrahima Bakayoko	PAOK	2
10	(Brazil) Israel Silva	Kerkyra	2
10	(Ghana) Bennard Yao Kumordzi	Panionios	2
10	(Argentina) Luciano Galletti	Olympiacos	2
10	(Argentina) Lucio Filomeno	Asteras Tripolis	2
10	(Algeria) Rafik Djebbour	AEK Athens	2
10	(Greece) Vangelis Kaounos	Kalamata / Asteras Tripolis	2
10	(Brazil) Dudu Cearense	Olympiacos	2
