= Rimoldi =

Rimoldi is an Italian surname. Notable people with the surname include:

- Adriano Rimoldi (1912–1965), Italian actor
- Jorgelina Rimoldi (born 1971), Argentine field hockey player
- Lucas Rimoldi (born 1980), Argentine footballer
- Pietro Rimoldi, Italian cyclist
