= CD Pozoblanco =

Association football club in Spain

Pozoblanco
- Full name: Club Deportivo Pozoblanco
- Founded: 1926
- Ground: Municipal, Pozoblanco, Andalusia, Spain
- Capacity: 5,000
- President: José Antonio Bravo
- Head coach: Mario Rojas
- League: Tercera Federación – Group 10
- 2025–26: Tercera Federación – Group 10, 11th of 18
Home colours	Away colours

Club Deportivo Pozoblanco is a Spanish football team based in Pozoblanco, Córdoba, in the autonomous community of Andalusia. Founded in 1926, it plays in Tercera Federación – Group 10, holding home matches at Estadio Municipal de Pozoblanco, with a 5,000-seat capacity.

== Season to season ==
Season	Tier	Division	Place	Copa del Rey
1926–1953	—	Regional	—	
1952–53	4	1ª Reg.	16th	
1953–54	4	1ª Reg.	12th	
1954–55	4	1ª Reg.	7th	
1955–56	4	1ª Reg.	5th	
1956–57	3	3ª	11th	
1957–58	3	3ª	17th	
1958–59	4	1ª Reg.		
1959–60	3	3ª	15th	
1960–61	4	1ª Reg.	6th	
1961–62	4	1ª Reg.		
1962–63	4	1ª Reg.		
1963–64	4	1ª Reg.		
1964–65	4	1ª Reg.		
1965–66	4	1ª Reg.		
1966–67	4	1ª Reg.		
1967–68	5	2ª Reg.		
1968–69	5	2ª Reg.		
1969–70	5	2ª Reg.		
1970–71	5	2ª Reg.	4th	

Season	Tier	Division	Place	Copa del Rey
1971–72	5	2ª Reg.	14th	
1972–73	5	2ª Reg.	19th	
1973–74	5	2ª Reg.	20th	
1974–75	5	2ª Reg.	14th	
1975–76	5	1ª Reg.	17th	
1976–77	6	2ª Reg.	2nd	
1977–78	6	1ª Reg.	1st	
1978–79	5	Reg. Pref.	8th	
1979–80	5	Reg. Pref.	1st	
1980–81	4	3ª	6th	
1981–82	4	3ª	16th	
1982–83	4	3ª	4th	
1983–84	4	3ª	9th	
1984–85	4	3ª	6th	
1985–86	4	3ª	5th	
1986–87	4	3ª	18th	
1987–88	5	Reg. Pref.	1st	
1988–89	5	Reg. Pref.	1st	
1989–90	4	3ª	5th	
1990–91	4	3ª	5th	

Season	Tier	Division	Place	Copa del Rey
1991–92	4	3ª	7th	
1992–93	4	3ª	10th	
1993–94	4	3ª	18th	
1994–95	4	3ª	1st	
1995–96	4	3ª	8th	
1996–97	4	3ª	9th	
1997–98	4	3ª	16th	
1998–99	4	3ª	12th	
1999–2000	4	3ª	7th	
2000–01	4	3ª	11th	
2001–02	4	3ª	17th	
2002–03	5	Reg. Pref.	2nd	
2003–04	5	Reg. Pref.	1st	
2004–05	4	3ª	6th	
2005–06	4	3ª	17th	
2006–07	4	3ª	12th	
2007–08	4	3ª	5th	
2008–09	4	3ª	10th	
2009–10	4	3ª	6th	
2010–11	4	3ª	3rd	

Season	Tier	Division	Place	Copa del Rey
2011–12	4	3ª	12th	
2012–13	4	3ª	15th	
2013–14	4	3ª	18th	
2014–15	5	1ª And.	5th	
2015–16	5	1ª And.	5th	
2016–17	5	Div. Hon.	8th	
2017–18	5	Div. Hon.	6th	
2018–19	5	Div. Hon.	3rd	
2019–20	4	3ª	18th	
2020–21	4	3ª	6th / 3rd	
2021–22	5	3ª RFEF	12th	
2022–23	5	3ª Fed.	10th	
2023–24	5	3ª Fed.	4th	
2024–25	5	3ª Fed.	7th	
2025–26	5	3ª Fed.	11th	
2026–27	5	3ª Fed.		

- 36 seasons in Tercera División
- 6 seasons in Tercera Federación/Tercera División RFEF

== Former players ==
- (Argentina) Sergio Páez
- (Spain) Pepe Díaz
- (Spain) Antonio López
- (Spain) Sergio Navarro

== Former coaches ==
- (Spain) Rafael Berges
