= Anastasios Kyriakos =

Greek footballer

Tasos Kyriakos
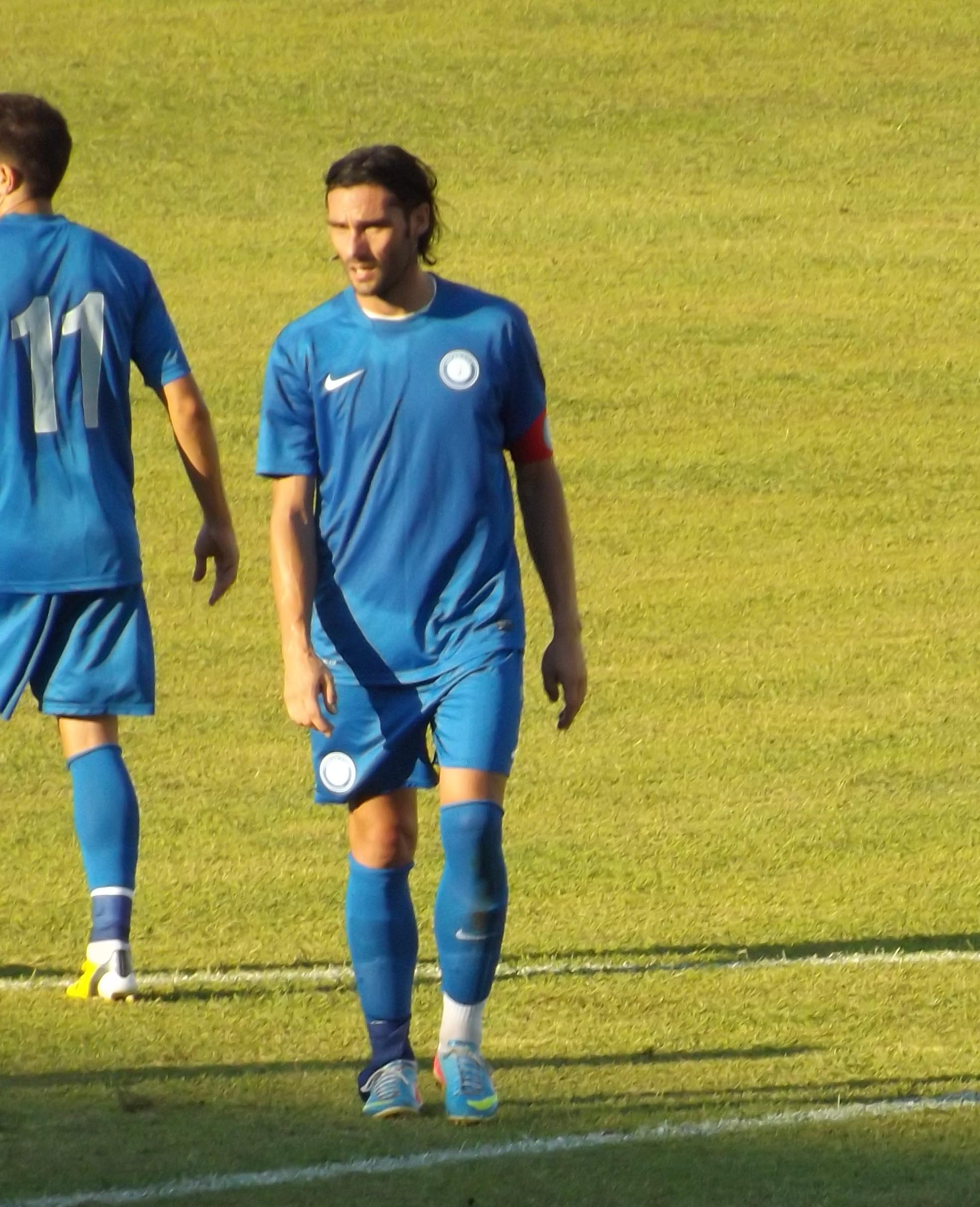

Personal information
- Full name: Anastasios Kyriakos
- Date of birth: 14 August 1978 (age 48)
- Place of birth: Giannouli, Larissa, Greece
- Height: 1.77 m (5 ft 9 1/2 in)
- Positions: Defender; midfielder

Youth career
- Pelasgiotida

Senior career*
Years	Team	Apps	(Gls)
1997–1999	Apollon Larissa	8	(0)
2000–2002	AEL	31	(3)
2002–2005	Kallithea	75	(9)
2005–2006	Olympiacos	0	(0)
2006–2007	Aris	13	(1)
2008	Asteras Tripolis	6	(0)
2008–2009	AEL	23	(0)
2009–2010	AC Omonoia	5	(0)
2010–2012	PAS Giannina	45	(6)
2012–2013	Niki Volos	36	(4)
2013–2014	Iraklis	7	(2)
2014	Paniliakos	8	(4)
2014	Apollon Smyrnis	11	(0)
2015	Tyrnavos	18	(0)
2016–2017	Apollon Larissa		
2017–2018	Asteras Amaliada	19	(1)
2018	Aetos Makrychori	2	(0)
2018–2019	Diagoras Stefanovikeio		
2019	AS Ano Meras		
2019–2020	Diagoras Stefanovikeio		
2020–2021	Iraklis Halki		
2022	Astrapi Neas Politias		
2022–2023	AO Damasiakos		
2023	Kissavos Sykouriou		
- * Club domestic league appearances and goals as of 3 October 2018

Tasos Kyriakos (Greek: Τάσος Κυριάκος; born 14 August 1978) is a former Greek footballer who played as a defender or midfielder.

== Career ==
Born in Giannouli, Larissa, Kyriakos started his career at his hometown with Apollon Larissa and he later moved to the local giants AEL, then playing in Beta Ethniki.

Since 2002 he competed in the Greek First Division, as a player of Kallithea, Olympiacos, Aris, Asteras Tripolis and again AEL, where he returned on 25 August 2008 and played for one season. On 15 July 2013 he signed an annual contract with Iraklis. In January 2014, Kyriakos signed a contract with Greek Football League club Paniliakos

The transfer from Kallithea to Olympiacos was by some seen as a surprise move despite the fact that Olympiacos had competition for the signature of the player. Rumors in the Greek media, Ethnospor among others, claimed that Brøndby IF and their head coach Michael Laudrup expressed their interest in Kyriakos just before Olympiacos signed him.

== Honours ==
Omonia

- Cypriot Championship: 2009–10
