= Alain Ekwe =

Cameroonian footballer

Personal information
- Full name: Alain Michel Ekwe
- Date of birth: 20 March 1982 (age 44)
- Place of birth: Douala, Cameroon
- Height: 1.85 m (6 ft 1 in)
- Position: Forward

Youth career
- Boavista

Senior career*
Years	Team	Apps	(Gls)
2001–2002	Gondomar	23	(2)
2002–2003	Leça	17	(0)
2003–2004	Pietà Hotspurs	12	(2)
2005–2007	Asteras Tripoli	28	(5)
2007–2008	Aiolikos	10	(2)
2008–2009	Kastoria	11	(3)
2010	Boss Bình Định		
2010–2011	Puntarenas		
- * Club domestic league appearances and goals as of 1 July 2011

Alain Michel Ekwe (born 20 March 1982 in Douala) is a Cameroonian footballer who plays as a forward. He also has Portuguese nationality, due to the many years spent in the country.

Ekwe played professional football in Portugal, Malta, Greece, Vietnam and Costa Rica, his biggest achievement being appearing in the second division for both Leça FC, Asteras Tripolis F.C. and Kastoria FC (one season apiece).
