= Dimitrios Sialmas =

Greek footballer

Dimitris Sialmas
Personal information
- Full name: Dimitrios Sialmas
- Date of birth: 19 June 1986 (age 40)
- Place of birth: Athens, Greece
- Height: 1.71 m (5 ft 7 1/2 in)
- Position: Forward

Team information
- Current team: Apollonas Efpaliou

Youth career
- 2005–2006: Ethnikos Asteras

Senior career*
Years	Team	Apps	(Gls)
2006–2008	Panionios	20	(4)
2008–2009	Ethnikos Piraeus	15	(6)
2009–2011	PAS Giannina	33	(11)
2010	→ Olympiacos Volos (loan)	9	(2)
2011–2012	AEK Athens	22	(2)
2012–2013	FK Khazar Lankaran	21	(6)
2013–2014	Platanias	9	(0)
2015–2016	Ceahlăul Piatra Neamţ	9	(3)
2016	Akropolis	6	(1)
2016–2017	Panachaiki	23	(9)
2017–2018	Trikala	4	(2)
2019	Irodotos	11	(3)
2019	Gladesville Ryde Magic		
2019	Nafplio 2017		
2020	Agia Paraskevi		
2019–2020	Asteras Vlachioti		
2021	AO Nea Artaki		
2021-2022	Pelopas Kiato		
2022	Agioi Anargyroi		
2022–	Apollonas Efpaliou		
- * Club domestic league appearances and goals as of 25 October 2022

Dimitrios Sialmas (Greek: Δημήτριος Σιαλμάς; born 19 June 1986) is a Greek professional footballer who plays as a forward for Apollonas Efpaliou.

== Club career ==
=== Panionios ===
In August 2006, Sialmas signed a two-year deal with Panionios from Ethnikos Asteras. However, he didn't impress with his appearances as he scored 6 goals throughout two years.

=== Ethnikos Piraeus, PAS Giannina and Olympiakos Volos ===
In July 2008, Sialmas signed a two-year deal with Ethnikos Piraeus, which lasted for only one. Afterwards, Giannina approached him and signed him, as PAS considered him to be a talented striker. Giannina fans loved him, something that intrigued the Volos club and that led Olympiacos Volos to sign him on loan for 6 months.

=== AEK Athens ===
On 30 May 2011 Sialmas signed a three-year deal with AEK Athens on a free transfer keeping him at the club until 2014. Sialmas also chose the number 11 Jersey previously worn by former AEK player Demis Nikolaidis. His skills and movements reminded ΑΕΚ fans of Nikolaidis and many of them compared the two. Sialmas scored two goals against Levadiakos and helped AEK to win 0–2. He was also given the MVP award.

=== Khazar Lankaran ===
In the summer of 2012 Sialmas signed for Azerbaijan Premier League side Khazar Lankaran on a one-year contract. Sialmas scored six goals in 24 games in all competitions for Khazar, as well as reaching the 2012–13 Azerbaijan Cup final. In the final the game went to penalties after finishing 0–0 after extra time, Sialmas took and missed the opening Khazar penalty, resulting in Neftchi Baku winning 5–3 on penalties. Sialmas was released at the end of his contract in the summer of 2013.

=== Platanias ===
On 12 December 2013 Sialmas signed for Super League Greece side Platanias on a 1 1/2-year contract.

=== Ceahlăul Piatra Neamţ ===
In January 2015, Sialmas decided to stay abroad, although he had offers from Greek Super League clubs to be repatriated. The Greek striker will continue his career in Ceahlăul Piatra Neamţ for the next six months, which struggling for remaining in the first division of the Romanian championship.

=== Akropolis ===
In March 2016, Sialmas moved to Swedish side Akropolis IF.

=== Panachaiki ===
In August 2016, Sialmas agreed with Panachaiki, a club playing in Greek 3rd Division.

=== Trikala ===
On 30 August 2017, he moved to Football League side Trikala. On 21 September 2017, he made his debut and scored his first goal, with a beautiful bicycle kick, in a 3–1 away win against Sparti for the Greek Cup. However, before the final whistle he was injured and one day later the medical diagnosis confirmed that he had suffered a cruciate rupture. He is expected to return in five months. On 13 May 2018, in the second game following his recovery from his injury, he came in as a substitute and scored with a stunning bicycle kick in a 1–0 home win against Aiginiakos. One week later he scored with an amazing 30-yard shot in a 1–0 away win against Kallithea.

=== Irodotos ===
On 29 December 2018, following his release from Trikala, he joined Irodotos on a free-transfer. On 10 February 2019, he scored his first goal for the club with an impressive bicycle kick equalizing the score in an eventual 1–1 home draw against Iraklis. One week later, he equalized in a 1–1 away draw against Aittitos Spata, securing a precious point for his team in the battle to avoid promotion.

=== Australia and later career ===
On 20 June 2019 Gladesville Ryde Magic confirmed, that they had signed Sialmas. However, he was presented as a new Nafplio 2017 player in Greece on 16 September 2019. One month later, he joined Asteras Vlachioti.
