= José Emílio Furtado =

Cape Verdean footballer

José Furtado
Personal information
- Full name: José Emílio Robalo Furtado
- Date of birth: 14 March 1983 (age 43)
- Place of birth: Praia, Cape Verde
- Height: 1.82 m (6 ft 0 in)
- Position: Forward

Youth career
- 1996–2001: Casa Pia

Senior career*
| Years | Team | Apps | (Gls) |
| 2001–2003 | Casa Pia | 45 | (16) |
| 2003–2005 | Porto B | 30 | (9) |
| 2004–2005 | → Tourizense (loan) | 25 | (12) |
| 2005 | → Vihren (loan) | 12 | (10) |
| 2006–2007 | CSKA Sofia | 18 | (6) |
| 2007–2008 | Paços Ferreira | 18 | (1) |
| 2009 | União Leiria | 4 | (0) |
| 2009–2010 | Ionikos | 30 | (13) |
| 2010–2011 | PAS Giannina | 15 | (2) |
| 2011–2012 | Panachaiki | 34 | (27) |
| 2012–2013 | AEK Athens | 18 | (1) |
| 2013–2014 | Poli Timișoara | 8 | (0) |
| 2015 | Panegialios | 17 | (8) |
| 2015–2016 | Panserraikos | 25 | (13) |
| 2016–2017 | Anagennisi Deryneia | 20 | (6) |
| 2017 | Olimpia Grudziądz | 3 | (0) |
| 2017–2018 | Sparta | 23 | (4) |
| Total | | 342 | (128) |
- * Club domestic league appearances and goals

José Emílio Robalo Furtado (born 14 March 1983) is a Cape Verdean former professional footballer who played as a forward. He also holds Portuguese citizenship.

== Career ==
Born in Praia, Cape Verde, Furtado started his football career in Portugal with lowly Casa Pia in the Lisbon area, where he also made his senior debuts. He moved to Porto in 2003, playing one full season with its reserves then moving on loan to another modest club, Tourizense.

In June 2005, Furtado, still on loan from Porto, signed with Bulgarian team Vihren Sandanski, where he scored regularly in the First Professional Football League. In the following January transfer window, he was sold to fellow league side CSKA Sofia for €300.000.

Furtado's spell with the "armymen" also started in a scoring fashion, but eventually ended on a sour note: he fell out with manager Stoycho Mladenov due to disciplinary breaches (being temporarily removed from the squad), and was also involved in a physical confrontation with captain Valentin Iliev, which ultimately led to his return to Portugal.

In the summer of 2007, Furtado moved to the Portuguese Primeira Liga as he signed with Paços de Ferreira. On 18 August he made his debut in the competition by playing the second half of a 3–1 away loss against Marítimo, and was relatively used during the campaign in a second-to-last finish with the subsequent relegation – later reinstatement due to Boavista's irregularities.

Furtado split 2008–09 with Paços and U.D. Leiria, then moved abroad again, signing for Ionikos in the Greek second level. In his first year, he finished third in the competition's top scorers list but his team could only rank 15th, the last position before the relegation zone.

In 2010, Furtado signed for PAS Giannina, still in Greece and its second division. More of the same happened in the 2011–12 season, with Panachaiki.
