= Christos Doukas =

Greek footballer

Personal information
- Full name: Christos Doukas
- Date of birth: 6 July 1980 (age 46)
- Place of birth: Agioi Theodoroi, Greece
- Height: 1.92 m (6 ft 3 1/2 in)
- Position: Central defender

Youth career
- Aetos Agioi Theodoroi

Senior career*
Years	Team	Apps	(Gls)
2001–2004	Anagennisi Karditsa	?	(?)
2004–2011	Anagennisi Karditsa	125	(5)
- * Club domestic league appearances and goals

Christos Doukas (Greek: Χρήστος Δούκας, born 6 July 1980) is a Greek footballer who plays for Anagennisi Karditsa F.C. in the Beta Ethniki. Doukas began his playing career in Aetos Agiou Theodorou and he signed for Anagennisi Karditsa in summer 2001. He helped "Kanaria" in a difficult period for the club's history and fame. His height and strength helped him to become first team regular from his early days in the club.

With Anagennisi Karditsa he played in Delta Ethniki, Gamma Ethniki and Beta Ethniki and celebrated his team's promotions in 2004 and 2008. He signed a new two-year contract with the club following the 2009–10 season.

Doukas is currently the player with the longest stay in the team, making out his 9th season in a row for Anagennisi Karditsa. He's also known as "mountain" due to his talent in defence. He has gained more than 150 caps for Anagennisi so far.
