= Giannis Alexiou =

Greek footballer

Personal information
- Full name: Ioannis Alexiou
- Date of birth: 8 December 1984 (age 41)
- Place of birth: Drama, Greece
- Height: 1.93 m (6 ft 4 in)
- Position: Defender

Team information
- Current team: SC St. Tönis 11/20
- Number: 30

Youth career
- Doxa Drama F.C.

Senior career*
| Years | Team | Apps | (Gls) |
| 2003–2004 | Megas Alexandros | | |
| 2004–2005 | Pandramaikos | | |
| 2006–2009 | Veria | 59 | (2) |
| 2009–2012 | Levadiakos | 39 | (0) |
| 2012–2016 | Uerdingen | 86 | (4) |
| 2016–2019 | Jahn Hiesfeld | 67 | (4) |
| 2019– | SC St. Tönis 11/20 | 73 | (6) |
- * Club domestic league appearances and goals as of 13 November 2022

Giannis Alexiou (Greek: Γιάννης Αλεξίου; born 8 December 1984) is a Greek football player who plays for German Oberliga Niederrhein club SC St. Tönis 11/20.

== Career ==
Born in Drama, Alexiou began playing football with Megas Alexandros Irakleia F.C. in the Delta Ethniki. He signed on 3. July 2012 with German Oberliga Niederrhein club KFC Uerdingen.
