= Angelos Sikalias =

Greek footballer

Personal information
- Date of birth: 10 November 1989 (age 37)
- Place of birth: Athens, Greece
- Height: 1.83 m (6 ft 0 in)
- Positions: Defender; full back

Senior career*
Years	Team	Apps	(Gls)
2007–2011	Ilioupoli	39	(0)
2008	→ Marko (loan)	0	(0)
2011–2012	Doxa Drama	21	(0)
2012–2013	Iraklis Psachnon	16	(1)
- * Club domestic league appearances and goals as of 09:11, 21 April 2012 (UTC)

Angelos Sikalias (Greek: Άγγελος Σικαλιάς, born 10 November 1989) is a professional Greek football player.

He started his career with Ilioupoli, where he made a total of 39 league appearances in the Beta and Gamma Ethniki championships. On 8 July 2011, he signed for current club Doxa Drama.
