= Stefanos Kapias =

Greek footballer

Personal information
- Date of birth: 15 February 1984 (age 42)
- Place of birth: Thessaloniki, Greece
- Height: 1.86 m (6 ft 1 in)
- Position: Centre-back

Team information
- Current team: Nafpaktiakos

Youth career
- Apollon Kalamarias

Senior career*
Years	Team	Apps	(Gls)
2002–2006	Apollon Kalamarias	0	(0)
2006–2007	Anagennisi Karditsa	12	(0)
2007–2008	Giannena	43	(4)
2008–2012	Veria	45	(2)
2012–2013	Ethnikos Gazoros	31	(3)
2013–2014	Apollon Kalamarias	9	(1)
2014–2016	Agrotikos Asteras	56	(5)
2016–2018	Apollon Pontus	17	(1)
2018–2021	Karaiskakis	45	(2)
2021–	Nafpaktiakos		

International career
	Greece U21	1	(0)
- * Club domestic league appearances and goals as of 25 March 2021

Stefanos Kapias (Greek: Στέφανος Καπίας; born 15 February 1984) is a Greek professional footballer who plays as a centre-back for Nafpaktiakos.
