= Estadio Municipal de Pozoblanco =

Multi-use stadium in Pozoblanco, Spain

Coordinates: 38°22′35.66″N 4°50′29.31″W

Estadio Municipal Pozoblanco is a multi-use stadium in Pozoblanco, Spain. It is currently used mostly for football matches . The stadium holds 5,000 people.
