= Shaibu Yakubu =

Ghanaian footballer

Personal information
- Date of birth: November 2, 1986 (age 40)
- Place of birth: Obuasi, Ghana
- Height: 1.66 m (5 ft 5 in)
- Position: Winger

Team information
- Current team: Adıyamanspor
- Number: 12

Senior career*
Years	Team	Apps	(Gls)
2003–2007	Ashanti Gold		(34)
2008–2009	Hacettepe S.K.	11	(0)
2009	Etisalat	5	(0)
2009–2010	Kartalspor	28	(14)
2010–2011	OFI	27	(7)
2011–2013	Enosis Neon Paralimni	27	(2)
2013–2014	1461 Trabzon	27	(2)
2014–2015	Ceyhanspor	10	(5)
2015–2016	Petrojet	28	(2)
2017–	Adıyamanspor	?	(?)
- * Club domestic league appearances and goals as of 26 November 2017

Shaibu Yakubu (born November 2, 1986, in Obuasi) is a Ghanaian football player who plays for Adıyamanspor in Turkey.

== Career ==
In 2008 Yakubu moved to Hacettepe Spor Kulübü in the Süper Lig, before joining Kartalspor in 2009. Then he moved to Greek club OFI before a summer 2011 switch to Enosis Neon Paralimni in the Cypriot First Division.
