= Sergio Páez =

Argentine footballer

Personal information
- Full name: Sergio Ariel Páez
- Date of birth: March 30, 1981 (age 45)
- Place of birth: Buenos Aires, Argentina
- Height: 1.81 m (5 ft 11 in)
- Position: Defensive midfielder

Youth career
- 1995–2002: Boca Juniors

Senior career*
Years	Team	Apps	(Gls)
2001–2002	Boca Juniors	11	(2)
2002	Sarmiento de Junín	4	(0)
2003	Deportivo Morón	12	(3)
2003	C.D. Espoli	13	(2)
2004–2006	Juventud Antoniana	14	(6)
2006	Pozoblanco	0	(0)
2006–2010	Pierikos	34	(5)
2010–2011	Aias Salamina	1	(0)
2011–2013	Sarmiento de Leones	47	(2)
- * Club domestic league appearances and goals as of 2013

Sergio Ariel Páez (born 30 March 1981, in Buenos Aires) is a retired Argentine footballer who played as a defensive midfielder.
