= César Castro (footballer, born 1983) =

Venezuelan footballer

Personal information
- Full name: César Alberto Castro Perez
- Date of birth: 10 April 1983 (age 43)
- Place of birth: San Cristobal, Tachira, Venezuela
- Height: 1.85 m (6 ft 1 in)
- Positions: Defender; defensive midfielder

Youth career
- Necaxa
- Badaloní
- Atlas

Senior career*
Years	Team	Apps	(Gls)
- Tossa de Mar
–2007	L'Escala		
2007–2008	Atromitos	10	(1)
2008–2009	PAS Giannina		
2009–2011	Panserraikos	25	(0)
2011–2012	Olympiakos Nicosia	1	(0)
2012	Vyzas		
2013–2014	Deportivo Lara		
- * Club domestic league appearances and goals

César Alberto Castro Perez (born April 10, 1983, in Táchira), commonly known as César Castro, is a former Venezuelan football defender who played in 2011–2012 season for Olympiakos Nicosia in Cyprus, where he spent most of the season on the sidelines injured and only managed to play once, without completing a full 90 minutes.

== Club career ==
Castro started his professional career in Spain for FC L'Escala then moved to Greece in 2007 and played one season for Atromitos F.C., PAS Giannina F.C. and Panserraikos After his fullest season in Greece with his last club, playing 25 games, he moved to Cyprus, but was injured in pre-season. He then returned to Greece after Cyprus for 6 months for Vyzas F.C. before returning to his home country for Deportivo Lara in 2013–2014.
