= Luiz Carlos (footballer, born March 1980) =

Brazilian footballer (born 1980)

Personal information
- Full name: Luiz Carlos Guedes Stukas
- Date of birth: 10 March 1980 (age 46)
- Place of birth: Porto Alegre, Brazil
- Height: 1.91 m (6 ft 3 in)
- Position: Centre-back

Senior career*
Years	Team	Apps	(Gls)
1999–2005	Rio Branco		
2005	Juventus - SP		
2005–2008	Paços de Ferreira	58	(5)
2008–2009	União de Leiria	28	(6)
2009	→ South China (loan)	0	(0)
2010	Paykan	17	(3)
2010	PAS Giannina	1	(0)
2011	Anagennisi Karditsa	16	(0)
2011–2012	Bragantino	16	(1)
2012–2013	Santa Clara		
2013–2015	União de Leiria		
- * Club domestic league appearances and goals as of 3 May 2016

Luiz Carlos Guedes Stukas (born 10 March 1980), commonly known as just Luiz Carlos, is a Brazilian footballer who last played for U.D. Leiria.

== Career ==
Luiz Carlos grew up in Porto Alegre, Brazil and began his career with Rio Branco at the age of 19 in 1999. After being with Rio Branco for six years in 2005, at age 25, he was bought by Juventus - SP. After his impressive play for Juventus, he was bought by Portuguese team Paços de Ferreira. Since joining Paços, he has been a key figure for the club in defence, forming good partnerships with teammates, even adjusting his style of play to fit the style Paços plays in. He made his debut for Paços at home to CD Nacional in a 1–0 loss on 21 August 2005 when he came on as a substitute, playing only six minutes.

== 2006–07 ==
Luiz Carlos played an important part in Paços de Ferreira's most successful year where he played 27 games out of a possible 30 and scored three goals. He formed a good partnership at centre back with Geraldo Alves and full backs Mangualde and Vitorino Antunes. With Luiz Carlos and his defence-partners forming the nucleus of the club, the 2006–07 season was their most successful in their history: they finished in sixth place and earned a berth in the UEFA Cup. On top of this, the club conceded only 36 goals. Luiz Carlos and his fellow defenders scored six goals, helping the team's cause.

== 2009/10 ==
South China AA convener Steven Lo announced on 6 July 2009 that Luiz Carlos has joined South China AA for the 2009–10 Hong Kong First Division League and AFC Cup 2009 season. He signed for the Iranian club Paykan F.C. in 2010.

== Career statistics ==
Club performance			League		Cup		Continental		Total	
Season	Club	League	Apps	Goals	Apps	Goals	Apps	Goals	Apps	Goals
Hong Kong			League		Cup		Continental		Total	
2009–10	South China	First Division	0	0	0	0	0	0	0	0
Iran			League		Hazfi Cup		Asia		Total	
2009–10	Paykan	Persian Gulf Cup	16	3	1	0	-	-	17	3
Total	Iran		17	3	1	0	0	0	18	3
Career total			17	3	1	0	0	0	18	3

- Assist Goals

Season	Team	Assists
09/10	Paykan	1
