= Carlos Massara =

Argentine footballer (born 1978)

Personal information
- Full name: Carlos Alberto Massara
- Date of birth: 19 June 1978 (age 48)
- Place of birth: Argentina
- Height: 1.86 m (6 ft 1 in)
- Position: Defender

Senior career*
Years	Team	Apps	(Gls)
1999–2001	Akratitos	22	(0)
2001–2002	Panelefsiniakos		
2002	Marko		
2003–2006	Levadiakos	7	(0)
2007–2008	Asteras Tripolis	21	(0)
2008–2010	Atromitos	29	(2)
2010–2011	Diagoras		
2011	Defensores Salto		
2011–2012	Defensores Cambaceres		
- * Club domestic league appearances and goals

Carlos Alberto Massara (born 19 June 1978) is a football player.

Massara moved to Greece to play for Akratitos F.C. in the Alpha Ethniki in August 1999.
