= Albert Marrama =

Spanish footballer

Personal information
- Full name: Albert Marrama Esteve
- Date of birth: 18 February 1983 (age 43)
- Place of birth: La Vall d'Uixó, Spain
- Height: 1.89 m (6 ft 2 1/2 in)
- Position: Goalkeeper

Youth career
- Valencia

Senior career*
Years	Team	Apps	(Gls)
2001–2007	Valencia B	118	(0)
2004–2005	→ Hércules (loan)	6	(0)
2007–2008	Poli Ejido	1	(0)
2008–2009	Onda	35	(0)
2009–2010	Moratalla	15	(0)
2010	Teruel		
2010–2011	Ilioupolis	26	(0)
2011–2012	Nea Salamis	2	(0)
Total		203	(0)

International career
2001	Spain U19	1	(0)
2002	Spain U20	2	(0)
- * Club domestic league appearances and goals

Albert Marrama Esteve (born 18 February 1983) is a Spanish retired footballer who played as a goalkeeper.

== Club career ==
Born in La Vall d'Uixó, Province of Castellón, Marrama was brought up at Valencia CF's youth system, but never made it past the reserve team. He also served a loan at Valencian Community neighbours Hércules CF.

Released by Valencia in summer 2007, Marrama made his professional debut in 2007–08, with Polideportivo Ejido in the Segunda División, but appeared only once in a relegation-ending season. Subsequently, he resumed his career in the Tercera División, having a brief spell in the Segunda División B with Moratalla CF (suffering another relegation). From March–May 2009 he was on trial at Scottish side Dundee United and PAS Giannina F.C. of Greece, but nothing came of it.

In late June 2011, following another stint in the latter country with GS Ilioupolis, Marrama signed with Nea Salamis Famagusta FC of the Cypriot First Division. He retired from football after only a couple of months however, aged only 28, and returned to his first club Valencia as youth teams' goalkeeping coach.
