= Manolis Skoufalis =

Greek footballer

Personal information
- Full name: Emmanouil Skoufalis
- Date of birth: 21 August 1978 (age 48)
- Place of birth: Nea Ionia, Athens, Greece
- Height: 1.78 m (5 ft 10 in)
- Position: Midfielder

Senior career*
Years	Team	Apps	(Gls)
1998–2000	Doxa Vyronas	37	(4)
2000–2002	Kozani		
2002–2003	Athinaikos	21	(1)
2003–2006	Akratitos	47	(7)
2006–2007	Kerkyra	29	(3)
2007–2010	Panionios	47	(2)
2010–2012	PAS Giannina	40	(3)
2012–2013	Niki Volos	41	(4)
2013	Panarkadikos	7	(3)
2014	Acharnaikos	7	(9)
2014	Thesprotos	9	(3)
- * Club domestic league appearances and goals as of 26 September 2023

Manolis Skoufalis (Greek: Μανώλης Σκούφαλης; born 21 August 1978) is a Greek coach and a former Greek footballer who last played as a midfielder for Thesprotos. He had made a name for himself in Greek football as an attacking-minded player with a flashy playing style, who usually played on the right wing.

== Career ==
Born in Nea Ionia, Skoufalis began playing football with Doxa Vyronas

== Managerial career ==
Following his retirement from football, Skoufalis was manager in amateur division teams. In August 2025, he was appointed as assistant manager of Nikos Koustas in PAS Giannina.
