= Kostas Louboutis =

Greek footballer

Personal information
- Full name: Konstantinos Louboutis
- Date of birth: 10 June 1979 (age 47)
- Place of birth: Thessaloniki, Greece
- Height: 1.79 m (5 ft 10 in)
- Position: Left back

Senior career*
Years	Team	Apps	(Gls)
1995–2002	Aris	118	(5)
2002–2005	Perugia	23	(0)
2003–2004	→ Siena (loan)	2	(0)
2005–2007	Twente	9	(0)
2006–2007	→ ADO Den Haag (loan)	6	(0)
2007	Anorthosis Famagusta	3	(0)
2008	Levadiakos	9	(0)
2008–2010	PAS Giannina	17	(0)

International career
1999	Greece	1	(0)
- * Club domestic league appearances and goals as of 26 September 2010

Konstantinos Louboutis (Greek: Κωνσταντίνος Λουμπούτης; born 10 June 1979) is a Greek former professional footballer. He was a defender who played as a left back.

Louboutis' career began when he signed a professional contract with hometown club Aris, making his first first-team appearance in 1995, at the age of 16. After seven years with the team he joined Serie A side Perugia before the start of the 2002–03 season. He was not able to become a regular in the team and played for a while for Siena on loan. When he returned to Perugia, the club was relegated to the Serie B, but he still was not a regular in the first team. He moved to the Netherlands to play for Eredivisie side FC Twente, where he only played 10 matches, then moved to ADO Den Haag before the start of 2006–07. During a training session on 24 August 2006, he suffered a knee injury that kept him out for five to six months. In July 2007, he transferred to Anorthosis Famagusta.

In January 2008, he moved to Levadiakos, until July 2008, when he moved to PAS Giannina. He was released in 2010.

== Honours ==
Perugia

- UEFA Intertoto Cup: 2003

Anorthosis Famagusta

- Cypriot Championship:2008
- Cypriot Cup: 2007
