= Kostas Pagonis =

Greek footballer

Personal information
- Date of birth: 11 September 1985 (age 41)
- Place of birth: Athens, Greece
- Height: 1.79 m (5 ft 10 1/2 in)
- Position: Left back

Youth career
- 2003: Akratitos

Senior career*
Years	Team	Apps	(Gls)
2004–2006	Akratitos	16	(0)
2006–2008	Atromitos	13	(0)
2008–2011	PAS Giannina	20	(0)
2009–2011	→Ethnikos (loan)	64	(0)
2011–2012	Panachaiki	1	(0)
2011–2012	Thrasyvoulos	20	(0)
2012–2013	AEL	34	(0)

International career
2006	Greece U-21	2	(0)
- * Club domestic league appearances and goals

Kostas Pagonis (Greek: Κώστας Παγώνης; born 11 September 1985 in Athens) is a Greek professional footballer, who last played for AEL in the Greek Football League.

== Club career ==
Pagonis started playing as an amateur for Akratitos in 2003. After a year playing with the team's youth squad, he was promoted to the first team and became a professional. Since then he has played in many teams mostly in the second and third national division. On 29 June 2012 he signed a one-year contract with AEL.
