= Christos Koutsospyros =

Greek footballer

Personal information
- Date of birth: 14 October 1981 (age 45)
- Place of birth: Agrinio, Greece
- Height: 1.85 m (6 ft 1 in)
- Position: Striker

Team information
- Current team: Aiginiakos F.C.

Youth career
- 1998–2000: Thyella Paravolas

Senior career*
Years	Team	Apps	(Gls)
2000–2002	Panetolikos	45	(7)
2002–2004	Panachaiki	24	(1)
2005–2006	Kallithea	52	(10)
2006–2008	Atromitos	30	(3)
2008–2010	PAS Giannina	18	(1)
2009	→ Panachaiki (loan)	11	(5)
2010	→ Kalamata (loan)	12	(3)
2011	Veria	12	(3)
2011–2012	Pierikos	24	(13)
2012–2013	Panetolikos	35	(5)
2014	Aiginiakos F.C.	32	(11)
2014–2015	A.E. Ermionida F.C.		
2015–2016	Agrotikos Asteras F.C.		
2016	Aiginiakos F.C.		
- * Club domestic league appearances and goals as of 18:32, 26 January 2014 (UTC)

Christos Koutsospyros (Greek: Χρήστος Κουτσοσπύρος; born 14 October 1981) is a Greek retired footballer who played as a forward.

== Career ==
Born in Agrinio, Koutsospyros began his playing career with local team Panetolikos.
