= Lucas Rimoldi =

Argentine footballer

Personal information
- Full name: Lucas Roberto Rimoldi
- Date of birth: August 10, 1980 (age 46)
- Place of birth: Córdoba, Argentina
- Height: 1.84 m (6 ft 0 in)
- Position: Midfielder

Senior career*
Years	Team	Apps	(Gls)
1996–2002	Instituto	86	(5)
2002–2003	Talleres	35	(1)
2003–2004	Deportivo Maldonado	0	(0)
2003–2004	→ Racing (loan)	32	(3)
2004–2007	Genoa	16	(6)
2006	→ Colón (loan)	12	(0)
2006–2007	→ Frosinone (loan)	12	(0)
2007–2008	Talleres	32	(1)
2008–2009	PAS Giannina	22	(2)
2009–2010	Panserraikos	13	(0)
2010	Iraklis	3	(0)
2010–2011	All Boys	16	(0)
2011–2012	Quilmes	20	(0)
2013	Neza	20	(3)
2014	Instituto	8	(0)
2016	CA Las Palmas	20	(4)
- * Club domestic league appearances and goals

Lucas Roberto Rimoldi (born 10 August 1980) is an Argentine former footballer who played as a midfielder.

== Career ==
Rimoldi is a product of the Instituto academies where he made his professional debut. In 2002 he left Instituto, joining Talleres. It was reported that businessman Diego Mazer acquired 50% of the Rimoldi's economic rights in 2003, for 330,000 Argentine peso.

The next season, he played for Racing in the Argentinian Primera Division, on loan from Deportivo Maldonado (a proxy club for the investors). At the end of the season he moved to Italy for Serie B outfit Genoa, from Deportivo Maldonado for €750,000 fee. He could not adapt in Genoa and thus he was loaned to Colón and Frosinone. He terminated the contract in 2007, joining Talleres. In the summer of 2008 he moved in the Greek Greek 2nd Division club PAS Giannina being one of the most influential players in the team's quest to promotion to the Greek Super League. Ηe continued his career again in the Greek Greek 2nd Division and in the summer of 2009 signed a contract with Panserraikos F.C. On February 1, 2010, he joined Iraklis. However, Rimoldi left the club to return to his home country on June of the same year, joining recently promoted All Boys.
