= Georgios Karakostas =

Greek footballer

Personal information
- Full name: Georgios Karakostas
- Date of birth: July 23, 1984 (age 42)
- Place of birth: Stanos, Aetolia-Acarnania, Greece
- Height: 1.74 m (5 ft 9 in)
- Positions: Centre back; right back

Youth career
- Akarnanikos

Senior career*
Years	Team	Apps	(Gls)
2001–2002	Panetolikos	11	(0)
2002–2003	Thermios Apollon	-	(-)
2003–2004	Akarnanikos	-	(-)
2004–2005	PAS Preveza	-	(-)
2005–2007	Anagennisi Artas	44	(4)
2007–2008	Ilisiakos	27	(2)
2008–2010	PAS Giannina	16	(0)
2009–2010	→Ethnikos Piraeus (loan)	26	(0)
2010–2011	Doxa Drama	27	(3)
2011–2012	AEL Kalloni	28	(1)
2012–2013	Panserraikos	9	(0)
2013–2014	AEL	19	(0)
2014–2015	Apollon Smyrnis	10	(0)
- * Club domestic league appearances and goals as of 8 July 2013

Georgios Karakostas (Greek: Γεώργιος Καρακώστας; born 23 July 1984) is a Greek football player.
