= Nikolaos Zafiropoulos =

Greek footballer

Personal information
- Date of birth: 8 January 1974 (age 52)
- Place of birth: Greece
- Height: 1.84 m (6 ft 1/2 in)
- Position: Goalkeeper

Senior career*
Years	Team	Apps	(Gls)
1991–1995	Panachaiki		
1996	Pyrgos		
1997	Irodotos		
1997	Kerkyra		
1998	Korinthos		
1998–1999	Atromitos		
2000–2001	Panegialos		
2002	Patraikos		
2003–2004	Panserraikos		
2004–2005	Apollon Kalamarias	23	(0)
2005–2006	Levadiakos	26	(0)
2008–2010	PAS Giannina	9	(0)
- * Club domestic league appearances and goals as of 17 July 2009

Nikolaos Zafiropoulos (born 8 January 1974) is a Greek footballer who last played for PAS Giannina F.C.

Zafiropoulos began his playing career by signing with Panachaiki in June 1991.
