= Giannouli =

Giannouli Γιάννουλη
- Municipal unit
- Location within the regional unit

- Location within Greece
- Coordinates: 39°40′N 22°24′E
- Country: Greece
- Administrative region: Thessaly
- Regional unit: Larissa
- Municipality: Larissa

Area
  - Municipal unit: 51.09 km^{2} (19.73 sq mi)
  - Community: 16.947 km^{2} (6.543 sq mi)
- Elevation: 70 m (230 ft)

Population (2021)
  - Municipal unit: 12,277
  - Municipal unit density: 240.3/km^{2} (622.4/sq mi)
  - Community: 8,165
  - Community density: 481.8/km^{2} (1,248/sq mi)
- Time zone: UTC+2 (EET)
  - Summer (DST): UTC+3 (EEST)
- Vehicle registration: ΡΙ

Giannouli (Greek: Γιάννουλη) is a town and a former municipality in the Larissa regional unit, Thessaly, Greece. Population 12,277 (2021). The municipal unit has an area of 51.092 km^{2}.
