= Ilias Michalopoulos =

Greek footballer

Personal information
- Full name: Ilias Michalopoulos
- Date of birth: 15 October 1985 (age 41)
- Place of birth: Athens, Greece
- Height: 1.78 m (5 ft 10 in)
- Position: Midfielder

Youth career
- 2001–2004: Atromitos

Senior career*
Years	Team	Apps	(Gls)
2004–2010	PAS Giannina	27	(5)
2010–2011	Veria	18	(0)
2011–2012	Kallithea	35	(5)
2012–2013	Panthrakikos	2	(0)
2013–2014	AEK Larnaca	3	(0)
2014–2015	Kallithea	26	(0)
2015–2016	Kifisia		
2016	Ilisiakos		
2016–2017	Agios Ierotheos		
2017–2018	Egaleo		
- * Club domestic league appearances and goals

Ilias Michalopoulos (Greek: Ηλίας Μιχαλόπουλος; born 15 October 1985) is a Greek footballer.

== Career ==
Born in Athens, Michalopoulos began his playing career by signing with Atromitos in October 2001.
