= Gustavinho (footballer, born 1982) =

Brazilian footballer

Personal information
- Full name: Gustavo Nacarato Veronesi
- Date of birth: May 7, 1982 (age 44)
- Place of birth: Alagoinhas, Brazil
- Height: 1.70 m (5 ft 7 in)
- Positions: Midfielder; right back

Youth career
- Botafogo

Senior career*
| Years | Team | Apps | (Gls) |
| 1999–2002 | Botafogo | 13 | (1) |
| 2002–2003 | Gama | | |
| 2003–2004 | Juventus-SP | | |
| 2004–2006 | Akratitos | 49 | (5) |
| 2006–2010 | Kerkyra | 128 | (10) |
| 2010 | Rapid București | 2 | (0) |
| 2010–2012 | Kerkyra | 46 | (3) |
| 2013 | Botafogo-SP | 2 | (0) |
- * Club domestic league appearances and goals as of 9 February 2018 (UTC)

Gustavo Nacarato Veronesi (born 7 May 1982, in Alagoinhas) is a retired Brazilian football player. In 2010 he played for Rapid București in Liga I.
