= Pavlos Vartziotis =

Greek footballer

Personal information
- Date of birth: 27 January 1981 (age 45)
- Place of birth: Ioannina, Greece
- Height: 1.87 m (6 ft 1 1/2 in)
- Position: Defender

Senior career*
Years	Team	Apps	(Gls)
1997–1999	Anagennisi Arta		
1999	Panetolikos		
2001–2004	Proodeftiki	10	(1)
2006–2007	Kerkyra	18	(0)
2009–2011	PAS Giannina	19	(0)
2012	Doxa Kranoula	13	(1)
2012	Vataniakos	4	(0)
2013	Tilikratis		
2013–2014	Thesprotos	2	(0)
2014	AO Stavrakiou 2009	17	(5)
2014–2016	AO Velissariou	40	(4)
2016–2017	Kentavros Mousiotitsas	21	(0)
2017–2020	Thyella Katsikas		
2021–2022	Thyella Katsikas		
- * Club domestic league appearances and goals as of 17 July 2009

Pavlos Vartziotis (Greek: Παύλος Βαρτζιώτης; born 27 January 1981) is a Greek former footballer.

Vartziotis began his playing career by signing with Anagennisi Arta in July 1997.
