= Georgios Melabianakis =

Greek footballer

Personal information
- Full name: Georgios Melabianakis
- Date of birth: 26 January 1981 (age 45)
- Place of birth: Athens, Greece
- Height: 1.70 m (5 ft 7 in)
- Position: Defender

Youth career
- Olympiacos

Senior career*
Years	Team	Apps	(Gls)
2000–2003	Olympiacos	0	(0)
2000–2001	→ Egaleo (loan)	9	(0)
2001–2002	→ Chania (loan)	29	(0)
2002–2003	→ Fostiras (loan)	12	(0)
2003–2008	Ionikos	76	(0)
2008	→ Veria (loan)	12	(0)
2009–2010	Anagennisi Karditsa	21	(0)
2010	Ionikos	16	(0)
2011	Anagennisi Karditsa		
2011–2012	Keratsini FC		
2012–2013	Kyanos Asteras Vari F.C.		
2013–2016	Mavros Aetos/Olympiada		
2016	Ifaistos Nikaia		
2016–2018	Aias Salamina		
2018–2021	Falirikos		
- * Club domestic league appearances and goals as of 31 July 2010

Georgios Melabianakis (Greek: Γιώργος Μελαμπιανάκης; born 26 January 1981) is a retired Greek footballer. From 2016 to 2018, he played for Aias Salamina F.C.

== Career ==
Born in Athens, Melabianakis began playing football in Olympiacos' youth teams. He was loaned to lower-division clubs, Egaleo, Chania and Fostiras, before joining Olympiacos' first team for the 2002–03 season. He did not play for the first team and joined Ionikos the following season. He played 4.5 seasons with Ionikos, and also joined Veria in the Super League Greece for one season on loan.
