= Alexandros Tsemperidis =

Greek footballer

Personal information
- Date of birth: 26 July 1986 (age 40)
- Place of birth: Kastoria, Greece
- Height: 1.83 m (6 ft 0 in)
- Position: Defensive midfielder

Youth career
- 2003: Panathinaikos

Senior career*
Years	Team	Apps	(Gls)
2004–2005	Panathinaikos	0	(0)
2005	→ Proodeftiki (loan)	7	(0)
2005–2007	→ Koropi (loan)	28	(0)
2007–2008	Ilisiakos	8	(0)
2008	Kastoria	20	(1)
2008–2009	Kerkyra	24	(1)
2009–2011	Ethnikos Piraeus	54	(2)
2011–2012	Panachaiki	22	(0)
2012–2014	Apollon Smyrnis	29	(0)
2014–2015	AEL	10	(0)
2015–2016	Agrotikos Asteras	19	(1)
2016–2017	Acharnaikos	15	(1)
2017–2018	Kalamata	9	(0)
2018	Apollon Pontus	15	(0)
2018–2019	Niki Volos	0	(0)
2019–2020	Triglia	3	(0)

Managerial career
- 2020: Triglia (technical director)
- * Club domestic league appearances and goals

Alexandros Tsemperidis (Greek: Αλέξανδρος Τσεμπερίδης; born 26 July 1986) is a retired Greek professional footballer who played as a defensive midfielder.

== Career ==
Tsemperidis was born on 26 July 1986 in Kastoria. He began his career from the youth teams of Panathinaikos, and in 2005 was given on loan to Proodeftiki and then to Koropi. He has also played in Ilisiakos, Kastoria, Kerkyra, Ethnikos Piraeus, Panachaiki and Apollon Smyrnis in which he was a key member. In 2013, he won promotion to the Super League. On 24 January 2014 he signed a 2.5 year contract with AEL.

In October 2019, Tsemperidis suffered an injury to his Anterior cruciate ligament and at the end of February 2020, he announced his retirement from football. However, he continued at Triglia in the role of a technical director. He left this position in July 2020.
