= 2011–12 PAS Giannina F.C. season =

PAS Giannina
2011–12 season
- Chairman: Giorgos Christovasilis
- Manager: Stéphane Demol (until 23 November 2011); Giannis Christopoulos (caretaker, 23 November 2011 to 4 December 2011); Angelos Anastasiadis (from 4 December 2011)
- Stadium: Zosimades Stadium, Ioannina
- Super League: 8th
- Greek Cup: Fifth round eliminated by Asteras Tripolis
- Top goalscorer: League: Bakayoko, Becerra; 7 goals All: Bakayoko, Becerra; 7 goals
- Highest home attendance: 5198; Olympiacos
- Lowest home attendance: 2048; Doxa Drama
- Average home league attendance: 3063
Home colours	Away colours

The 2011–12 season is PAS Giannina F.C.'s 17th competitive season in the top flight of Greek football, 2nd season in the Superleague Greece, and 46th year in existence as a football club. They also compete in the Greek Cup.

== Players ==
Updated:-

No.	Name	Nationality	Position(s)	Place of birth	Date of birth	Signed from	Notes
Goalkeepers
1	Karim Fegrouche	(Morocco)	GK	Fes, Morocco	14 February 1982	(Morocco) Wydad Casablanca	
30	Charalambos Tabasis	(Greece)	GK	Athens, Greece	10 May 1986	(Greece) Diagoras	
71	Fotis Kipouros	(Greece)	GK	Thessaloniki, Greece	9 August 1975	(Greece) Olympiakos Volos	
Defenders
2	Georgios Dasios (C)	(Greece)	RB	Ioannina, Greece	12 May 1983	-	
4	Ilias Kotsios	(Greece)	CB	Larissa, Greece	25 April 1977	(Greece) AEL	
5	Tasos Pantos (VC)	(Greece)	RB	Korydallos, Greece	5 May 1976	(Greece) Olympiacos	
6	Alexios Michail	(Greece)	CB	Ioannina, Greece	18 August 1986	(Greece) Panserraikos	
8	Themistoklis Tzimopoulos	(Greece)	CB	Kozani, Greece	20 November 1985	(Greece) Ethnikos Asteras	
23	Marios Oikonomou	(Greece)	CB	Ioannina, Greece	6 October 1992	(Greece) PAS Giannina U-20	
27	Vanderson Scardovelli (VC3)	(Brazil) (Italy)	LB	Dracena, Brazil	27 September 1984	(Italy) Treviso	
34	Giannis Zaradoukas	(Greece)	LB	Athens, Greece	12 December 1985	(Greece) Olympiacos	Loan
Midfielders
3	Andi Lila	(Albania)	DM	Kavajë, Albania	12 February 1986	(Albania) KF Tirana	
7	Tasos Kyriakos	(Greece)	RW	Giannouli, Larissa, Greece	14 August 1978	(Cyprus) AC Omonoia	
11	Leandro Becerra	(Argentina)	CM	Cordoba, Argentina	26 January 1984	(Argentina) Atlético Tucumán	
12	Evripidis Giakos	(Greece)	CM / CF	Ioannina, Greece	9 April 1991	(Greece) Doxa Kranoula	
15	Tomas De Vincenti	(Argentina)	CM	Buenos Aires, Argentina	9 February 1989	(Greece) Kalamata	
16	Paraskevas Andralas	(Greece)	DM / CB	Piraeus, Greece	2 December 1978	(Greece) Levadiakos	
17	Fotis Georgiou	(Greece)	RW	Arta, Greece	19 July 1985	(Greece) Diagoras	
18	Fabrizio Zambrella	(Switzerland) (Italy)	CM	Geneva, Switzerland	1 March 1986	(Switzerland) Sion	Loan
24	Paul Keita	(Senegal)	DM	Dakar, Senegal	23 June 1992		
26	Manolis Skoufalis	(Greece)	RW	Nea Ionia, Athens, Greece	21 August 1978	(Greece) Panionios	
49	Giannis Ioannou	(Greece)	CM	Ioannina, Greece	27 May 1994	(Greece) PAS Giannina U-20	
77	Christos Patsatzoglou (VC2)	(Greece)	DM	Athens, Greece	19 March 1979	(Greece) AEK Athens	
Forwards
10	Ibrahima Bakayoko	(Ivory Coast)	FW	Séguéla, Ivory Coast	31 December 1976	(Greece) PAOK	
14	Emiljano Vila	(Albania)	FW	Durrës, Albania	12 March 1988	(Albania) Dinamo Tirana	
22	Christos Tzanis	(Greece)	FW	Parapotamos, Greece	22 April 1985	(Greece) Anagennisi Arta	
Left during Winter Transfer Window
	Ronald Huth	(Paraguay) (Italy)	CB	Asunción, Paraguay	30 October 1989	(Paraguay) Tacuary	Loan
93	Mamadou Bagayoko	(Mali) (France)	FW	Paris, France	21 May 1979	(France) Nice	
9	Héctor Cuevas	(Argentina)	FW	Cordoba, Argentina	31 August 1982	(Argentina) Belgrano	Loan
21	Ismaël Bouzid	(Algeria) (France)	CB	Nancy, France	21 July 1983	(Scotland) Heart of Midlothian	
29	Jaouad Zairi	(Morocco)	LW / RW	Taza, Morocco	17 April 1982	(Greece) Olympiacos	

=== International players ===
- (Morocco) Karim Fegrouche (men's)
- (Greece) Giannis Zaradoukas (men's)
- (Albania) Andi Lila (men's, U-21/19/17)
- (Switzerland) Fabrizio Zambrella (U-21/19)
- (Senegal) Paul Keita (U-20/17)
- (Greece) Christos Patsatzoglou (men's, U-21)
- (Ivory Coast) Ibrahima Bakayoko (men's)
- (Albania) Emiljano Vila (men's, U-21/19/17)
- (Paraguay) Ronald Huth (men's, U-20)
- (Morocco) Jaouad Zairi (men's)
- (Mali) Mamadou Bagayoko (men's)
- (Algeria) Ismaël Bouzid (men's, U-23)

=== Foreign players ===
EU Nationals

EU Nationals (Dual Citizenship)
- (Brazil) (Italy) (Europe) Vanderson Scardovelli
- (Switzerland) (Italy) (Europe) Fabrizio Zambrella
- (Paraguay) (Italy) (Europe) Ronald Huth
- (Mali) (France) (Europe) Mamadou Bagayoko
- (Algeria) (France) (Europe) Ismaël Bouzid

Non-EU Nationals
- (Morocco) Karim Fegrouche
- (Albania) Andi Lila
- (Argentina) Leandro Becerra
- (Argentina) Tomas De Vincenti
- (Senegal) Paul Keita
- (Ivory Coast) Ibrahima Bakayoko
- (Albania) Emiljano Vila
- (Morocco) Jaouad Zairi
- (Argentina) Héctor Cuevas

== Personnel ==
=== Management ===
Position	Staff
Majority Owner	Giorgos Christovasilis
President and CEO	Giorgos Christovasilis
Director of Football	Dimitris Niarchakos
General Director	Paschalis Moschoglou
Team Manager	Panagiotis Christovasilis
Director of Office	Alekos Potsis
Head of Ticket Department	Andreas Potsis

=== Coaching staff ===
Position	Name
Head Coach	Stéphane Demol (until 23 November 2011) Giannis Christopoulos CT (from 23 November 2011 until 4 December 2011) Angelos Anastasiadis (from 4 December 2011)
Assistant Coach	Giannis Christopoulos (until 4 December 2011) Leonidas Dimitrakopoulos (from 4 December 2011)
Fitness Coach	Thomas Giannitopoulos (until 4 December 2011) Leonidas Dimitrakopoulos (from 4 December 2011)
Goalkeepers Coach	Christos Tseliopoulos (until 19 September 2011) Filippos Bolovinis (from 19 September 2011 until 4 December 2011) Apostolos Terzis (from 4 December 2011)

=== Medical staff ===
Position	Name
Head doctor	Spyros Siaravas
Doctor	Anastasios Georgoulis
Doctor	Kostas Patras
Physio	Filipos Skordos
Physio	Christos Maris

=== Scouting ===
Position	Name
Scouter	Giannis Christopoulos (from 12 December 2011)

=== Academy ===
Position	Name
Head of Youth Development	Andreas Lavdarias
Head Coach U-20	Giorgos Ladias (until 5 October 2011) Giannis Tatsis CT (from 5 October 2011 until 10 October 2011) Andreas Lavdarias (from 10 October 2011)
Head Coach U-17	Giannis Tatsis

== Transfers ==
=== Summer ===
==== In ====
No	Pos	Player	Transferred from	Fee	Date	Source
3	DM	Andi Lila	KF Tirana	-	24 June 2011	
17	RW	Fotis Georgiou	Diagoras	-	25 June 2011	
	FW	Athanasios Nikolopoulos	Thrasivoulos	Loan return	1 July 2011	
	LB	Giorgos Margaritis	Anagennisi Karditsas	Loan return	1 July 2011	
	CB	Lefteris Vatsis	Doxa Kranoulas	Loan return	1 July 2011	
	DM	Nicolás Schenone	Anagennisi Karditsas	Loan return	1 July 2011	
14	FW	Emiljano Vila	Dinamo Tirana	-	2 July 2011	
11	CM	Leandro Becerra	Atlético Tucumán	-	2 July 2011	
1	GK	Karim Fegrouche	Wydad Casablanca	-	7 July 2011	
30	GK	Charalambos Tabasis	Diagoras	-	8 July 2011	
	CB	Ronald Huth	Tacuary	Loan	11 July 2011	
9	FW	Héctor Cuevas	Belgrano	Loan	20 July 2011	
21	CB	Ismaël Bouzid	Heart of Midlothian	-	8 August 2011	
29	LW/ RW	Jaouad Zairi	Olympiacos	-	19 August 2011	
93	FW	Mamadou Bagayoko	Nice	-	12 September 2011	

==== Out ====
No	Pos	Player	Transferred to	Fee	Date	Source
	CB	Pavlos Vartziotis	Released	-	20 May 2011	
	GK	Athanasios Kouventaris	Released	-	20 May 2011	
	CM	Esteban Buján			31 May 2011	
	FW	José Emílio Furtado	Panachaiki	-	2 June 2011	
	RB	Giannis Stathis	Panthrakikos	-	30 June 2011	
	CM	Lambros Vangelis	Thrasivoulos	-	30 June 2011	
	FW	Dimitris Sialmas	AEK Athens	-	30 June 2011	
	CB	Luiz Carlos Guedes Stukas	Released	-	30 June 2011	
	LB	Kostas Pagonis	Released	-	30 June 2011	
	GK	Panagiotis Lolas	Released	-	30 June 2011	
	CM	Giorgos Kolios	Released	-	30 June 2011	
	CM	Panagiotis Christovasilis	Released	-	30 June 2011	
	GK	Georgios Sikalias	Panachaiki	-	14 July 2011	
	FW	Athanasios Nikolopoulos	Released	-	21 July 2011	
	CB	Lefteris Vatsis	Released	-	22 July 2011	
	DM	Nicolás Schenone	Released	-	3 July 2011	
	LB	Giorgos Margaritis	Released	-	11 August 2011	
	CM / CF	Evripidis Giakos	Doxa Kranoulas	Loan extension	31 August 2011	
18	CM	Kostas Pappas	Doxa Kranoulas	Loan	31 August 2011	
	CB	Ronald Huth	Released	-	28 September 2011	

For recent transfers, see List of Greek football transfers summer 2011

=== Winter ===
==== In ====
No	Pos	Player	Transferred from	Fee	Date	Source
12	CM / CF	Evripidis Giakos	Doxa Kranoulas	Loan return	2 January 2012	
34	LB	Giannis Zaradoukas	Olympiacos	Loan	6 January 2012	
	FW	Krisztián Németh	Olympiacos	-	18 January 2012	
18	CM	Fabrizio Zambrella	Sion	Loan	31 January 2012	
49	CM	Giannis Ioannou	PAS Giannina U-20	-		

==== Out ====
No	Pos	Player	Transferred to	Fee	Date	Source
93	FW	Mamadou Bagayoko	Released	-	15 December 2011	
9	FW	Héctor Cuevas	Released	-	2 January 2012	
21	CB	Ismaël Bouzid	Released	-	14 January 2012	
	FW	Krisztián Németh	Canceled	-	24 January 2012	
29	LW/ RW	Jaouad Zairi	Released	-	29 January 2012	

== Pre-season and friendlies ==
Win Draw Loss Upcoming fixture

25 July 2011 Friendly	PAS Giannina	1–3	Sivasspor	Seefeld in Tirol
18:00	Cuevas 67'	Report	Eneramo 46' (pen.); Mehmet Nas 84'; Murat Akça 87'	Stadium: unknown Attendance: unknown Referee: unknown

28 July 2011 Friendly	PAS Giannina	3–1	Al Ain	Seefeld in Tirol
18:00	Tzimopoulos 27'; Tzanis 66'; Becerra 68'	Report	Scocco 51' (pen.)	Stadium: unknown Attendance: unknown Referee: unknown

31 July 2011 Friendly	PAS Giannina	1–4	Aris Thessaloniki	Seefeld in Tirol
19:00	Cuevas 64' (pen.)	Report	Sakata 40'; Soltani 49'; Topouzis 68'; Neto 71' (pen.)	Stadium: unknown Attendance: unknown Referee: unknown

6 August 2011 Friendly	Panionios	1-1	PAS Giannina	Nea Smyrni
20:00	Kvirkvelia 88'	Report	Georgiou 90+3'	Stadium: Nea Smyrni Stadium; Attendance: unknown Referee: unknown

6 August 2011 Friendly	Pierikos	2-2	PAS Giannina	Katerini
20:00		Report		Stadium: Katerini Stadium; Attendance: unknown Referee: unknown

13 August 2011 Friendly	PAS Giannina	0-0	Olympiacos	Ioannina
21:00		Report		Stadium: Zosimades Stadium; Attendance: unknown Referee: unknown

18 August 2011 Friendly	PAS Giannina	1-3	Larissa	Ioannina
21:00	Becerra 80'	Report	Saitiotis 47'; Césinha 57'; Karanikas 88'	Stadium: Zosimades Stadium; Attendance: 1600; Referee: unknown

21 August 2011 Friendly	PAS Giannina	2-1	(Albania) Skënderbeu	Ioannina
20:00	Georgiou 16'; Bakayoko 16'	Report	Ribeiro 14'	Stadium: Zosimades Stadium; Attendance: unknown Referee: unknown

1 September 2011 Friendly	Doxa Kranoula	2-3	PAS Giannina	Kranoula
18:15		Report		Stadium: Kranoula Stadium; Attendance: unknown Referee: unknown

27 September 2011 Friendly	Pindos Konitsa	0-5	PAS Giannina	Konitsa
16:00		Report	Cuevas 7'; Bagayoko 54', 56', 72'; Tzanis 74'	Stadium: Konitsa Stadium; Attendance: unknown Referee: Moysiadis

6 October 2011 Friendly	PAS Giannina	3-1	Panachaiki	Ioannina
71:00	Skoufalis 49', 90'; Kyriakos 75'	Report	Kiliaras 74'	Stadium: Zosimades Stadium; Attendance: 200; Referee: unknown

26 October 2011 Friendly	PAS Giannina	2–1	PAS Giannina U-20	Ioannina
16:00	Cuevas (?); Bagayoko (?)	Report	Nikolaos Bagias (?)	Stadium: PEAKI; Attendance: unknown Referee: unknown

28 October 2011 Friendly	Kerkyra	1-1	PAS Giannina	Kerkyra
15:45		Report		Stadium: Kerkyra Stadium; Attendance: unknown Referee: unknown

2 November 2011 Friendly	Anatoli	0-5	PAS Giannina	Anatoli
15:30		Report	Michail 35'; Skoufalis 80'; Georgiou 81'; Tzimopoulos (?); Bakayoko 89'	Stadium: Anatoli Stadium; Attendance: unknown Referee: unknown

5 November 2011 Friendly	PAS Giannina	0-0	Doxa Drama	Ioannina
15:30		Report		Stadium: Zosimades Stadium; Attendance: unknown Referee: unknown

12 November 2011 Friendly	Panetolikos	1–0	PAS Giannina	Agrinio
16:00	Boumal (?)	Report		Stadium: Panetolikos Stadium; Attendance: 700; Referee: unknown

== Competitions ==
=== League table ===
Pos	Team	Pld	W	D	L	GF	GA	GD	Pts	Qualification or relegation
6	Asteras Tripolis	30	13	6	11	30	34	−4	45	Qualification for Europa League second qualifying round (Note: AEK Athens were not licensed to play in the Europa League 2012–13 and therefore were replaced by the 6th placed team in the league table, which were Asteras Tripolis (which played in the second qualifying round).)
7	Levadiakos	30	11	6	13	33	42	−9	39	
8	PAS Giannina	30	10	8	12	30	35	−5	38	
9	Aris (Note: Aris was docked three points following an object thrown into the field during a match against Asteras Tripolis and lost the game 0–3.)	30	10	10	10	29	33	−4	37 (Note: Head-to-head points: Aris 6, OFI 0.)	
10	OFI	30	10	7	13	27	32	−5	37	

Source: Super League Greece
Rules for classification: 1) Points, 2) Head-to-head points, 3) Head-to-head goal difference.
If in current league table there are tied teams after applying criteria 1 to 3, they are considered to share places and listed in Greek language alphabetic order.
If in final league table there are still tied teams after applying criteria 1 to 3, a decision match (or matches if they are more than two) are to be played but only in three cases: to determine the champion, to fill spots in the play-off or to determine the teams to be relegated. In any other case, the final standings of tied teams are determined with a public draw

==== Results summary ====
Overall								Home						Away					
Pld	W	D	L	GF	GA	GD	Pts	W	D	L	GF	GA	GD	W	D	L	GF	GA	GD
30	10	8	12	30	35	−5	38	6	5	4	15	15	0	4	3	8	15	20	−5

==== Fixtures ====
Win Draw Loss Upcoming fixture

27 August 2011 1	PAS Giannina	0-0	Aris Thessaloniki	Ioannina
21:30	Bouzid (yellow card) 28'; Pantos (yellow card) 72'	Report	Michel Pereira (yellow card) 34'; Faty (yellow card) 64'; Kapetanos (yellow card) 76'	Stadium: Zosimades Stadium; Attendance: 3578; Referee: Stavros Tritsonis

11 September 2011 2	Panathinaikos	3-1	PAS Giannina	Marousi
20:30	Sarriegi 7'; Katsouranis (yellow card) 31'; Toché 44'; Karagounis (yellow card) 74'; Leto 75'	Report	De Vincenti (yellow card) 38'; Pantos (yellow card) 49'; Bakayoko 68'	Stadium: Olympic Stadium; Attendance: 14026; Referee: Georgios Daskalopoulos

18 September 2011 3	PAS Giannina	3-1	Asteras Tripolis	Ioannina
16:00	Bakayoko 21'; Lila (yellow card) 36'; Georgiou 59'; Georgiou (yellow card) 60'; Pantos (yellow card) 80'; Zairi 84'	Report	Tsabouris 37' (pen.); Tsabouris (yellow card) 75'	Stadium: Zosimades Stadium; Attendance: 2418; Referee: Anastasios Sidiropoulos

25 September 2011 4	Panetolikos	2-2	PAS Giannina	Agrinio
19:30	Camara (yellow card) 13'; Theodoridis 25' (pen.); Theodoridis (yellow card) 26'; André Rocha (yellow card) 27' (yellow-red card) 39'; Camara 36'; Paleologos (yellow card) 67'	Report	Tzimopoulos (yellow card) 13'; Kotsios (yellow card) 16'; Bakayoko 30'; De Vincenti 34'; Bouzid (yellow card) 67'; Patsatzoglou (yellow card) 68'; Pantos (yellow card) 86'; Becerra (yellow card) 90+1'	Stadium: Panetolikos Stadium; Attendance: 5844; Referee: Ioannis Delfakis

2 October 2011 5	PAS Giannina	2-1	Kerkyra	Ioannina
16:00	Becerra 8'; Tzimopoulos (yellow card) 59'; Vila (yellow card) 65'; Tzimopoulos 68'; Kyriakos (yellow card) 85'; Pantos (yellow card) 90+4'	Report	Lampropoulos 44'; Kalantzis (yellow card) 50'; Tümer Metin (yellow card) 90+4'	Stadium: Zosimades Stadium; Attendance: 2492; Referee: Spyridon Selimos

16 October 2011 6	PAS Giannina	0-0	Panionios	Ioannina
16:00		Report	Goundoulakis (yellow card) 16'; Omo (red card) 40'; Kvirkvelia (yellow card) 54'; Cocalić (yellow card) 58'; Kuqi (yellow card) 58'; Siovas (yellow card) 72'; Samaris (yellow card) 87'	Stadium: Zosimades Stadium; Attendance: 2575; Referee: Praxitelis Zachariadis

22 October 2011 7	Atromitos	1-0	PAS Giannina	Athens
17:15	Giannoulis 31'; Thomas (yellow card) 31'; Zuela (yellow card) 39'; Skondras (yellow card) 56'; Itandje (yellow card) 59'; Tatos (yellow card) 67'; Giannoulis (yellow card) 78'	Report	Bouzid (yellow card) 12'; Lila (yellow card) 40'	Stadium: Peristeri Stadium; Attendance: 1973; Referee: Georgios Daskalopoulos

7 March 2012 8	PAS Giannina	1-0	Doxa Drama	Ioannina
19:00	Becerra 82' (pen.); De Vincenti (yellow card) 90+4'	Report	Aravidis (yellow card) 35' (yellow-red card) 41'; Kyvelidis (yellow card) 68'; Psychogios (yellow card) 76'; Vertzos (yellow card) 81'; Seremet (yellow card) 85'	Stadium: Zosimades Stadium; Attendance: 2048; Referee: Spyridon Selimos

14 March 2012 9	Levadiakos	1-1	PAS Giannina	Livadeia
17:00	Chumbinho 41' (pen.); Korbos (yellow card) 61'; Napoleoni (yellow card) 90+2'	Report	Lila (yellow card) 36'; Vila (yellow card) 39'; Kotsios (yellow card) 40'; De Vincenti (yellow card) 70'; Kyriakos 88'	Stadium: Levadia Municipal Stadium; Attendance: 579; Referee: Alexandros Aretopoulos

20 November 2011 10	PAS Giannina	0-2	Xanthi	Ioannina
17:15	Lila (yellow card) 45'; Pantos (yellow card) 48'; Kotsios (yellow card) 67'; Vanderson (yellow card) 90+2'	Report	Edimar Fraga 31'; Markovski 52'; Souanis (yellow card) 64'; Mantalos (yellow card) 71'; Edimar Fraga (yellow card) 85'; Kazakis (yellow card) 90+2'	Stadium: Zosimades Stadium; Attendance: 2127; Referee: Anastasios Kakos

26 November 2011 11	Ergotelis	2-1	PAS Giannina	Heraklion
17:15	Fragoulakis 15'; Budimir (yellow card) 43'; Kotsios 63' (o.g.); Sarris (yellow card) 79' (yellow-red card) 83'	Report	Tzimopoulos (yellow card) 18'; De Vincenti (yellow card) 31'; Kotsios (yellow card) 64'; Bakayoko 80' (pen.); Becerra (yellow card) 89'	Stadium: Pankritio Stadium; Attendance: 519; Referee: Ilias Spathas

4 December 2011 12	PAS Giannina	2-2	PAOK	Ioannina
17:15	Bakayoko 6', 49'; Pantos (yellow card) 20'; Vila (yellow card) 32'; Tzimopoulos (yellow card) 72'; Bouzid (yellow card) 90+4'	Report	Salpingidis (yellow card) 14'; Athanasiadis 17'; Lazăr 73' (pen.); Papazoglou (yellow card) 81'; Athanasiadis (yellow card) 90+6'	Stadium: Zosimades Stadium; Attendance: 3446; Referee: Alexandros Aretopoulos

10 December 2011 13	AEK Athens	2-1	PAS Giannina	Athens
19:30	José Carlos 15'; Pantos 52' (o.g.); José Carlos (yellow card) 74'; Kontoes (yellow card) 83'; Arabatzis (yellow card) 90+5'	Report	Fegrouche (yellow card) 27'; Lila (yellow card) 45'; Andralas (yellow card) 58'; Kyriakos (yellow card) 71'; Kotsios 73'; Bouzid (yellow card) 87'	Stadium: OAKA; Attendance: 12032; Referee: Athanasios Giachos

18 December 2011 14	Olympiacos	2-0	PAS Giannina	Piraeus
19:30	Fuster 9'; Holebas (yellow card) 22'; Djebbour 43'	Report	Andralas (yellow card) 31'; Kotsios (yellow card) 82'	Stadium: Karaiskakis Stadium; Attendance: 20915; Referee: Dimitris Styliaras

3 January 2012 15	PAS Giannina	0-0	OFI	Ioannina
17:15	Tzimopoulos (yellow card) 55'; Patsatzoglou (yellow card) 57'; Fegrouche (yellow card) 63'	Report	Georgiou (yellow card) 50'; Tavlaridis (yellow card) 78'; Kalajdžić (yellow card) 85'	Stadium: Zosimades Stadium; Attendance: 3415; Referee: Anastasios Sidiropoulos

8 January 2012 16	Aris	1–0	PAS Giannina	Thessaloniki
15:00	Castillo 12'; Kaznaferis (yellow card) 26'; Castillo (yellow card) 61'; Gianniotas (yellow card) 86'; Umbides (yellow card) 90+3'	Report	De Vincenti (yellow card) 24'; Skoufalis (yellow card) 28' (yellow-red card) 86'; Vanderson (yellow card) 38'; Becerra (yellow card) 60'; Patsatzoglou (yellow card) 74'	Stadium: Kleanthis Vikelidis Stadium; Attendance: 6742; Referee: Charalabos Kalogeropoulos

15 January 2012 17	PAS Giannina	0-1	Panathinaikos	Ioannina
19:30	Pantos (yellow card) 27'; De Vincenti (yellow card) 66'	Report	Cleyton (yellow card) 12'; Leto (yellow card) 20'; Spyropoulos (yellow card) 20'; Simão (yellow card) 31'; Cleyton 85'	Stadium: Zosimades Stadium; Attendance: 4309; Referee: Ilias Spathas

21 January 2012 18	Asteras Tripolis	2-1	PAS Giannina	Tripoli
17:15	Rayo 3'; Argyropoulos (yellow card) 19'; Pulido (yellow card) 41'; Solakis 90+1'	Report	Pantos (yellow card) 16'; Becerra 35'; Vila (yellow card) 36'; Georgiou (yellow card) 74'; Becerra (yellow card) 82'; Patsatzoglou (yellow card) 90+5'	Stadium: Theodoros Kolokotronis; Attendance: 1080; Referee: Dimitris Styliaras

29 January 2012 19	PAS Giannina	1–0	Panetolikos	Ioannina
15:00	Lila (yellow card) 36'; Skoufalis (yellow card) 37'; Zaradoukas (yellow card) 53'; Vila 71'; Vila (yellow card) 72'	Report	Siontis (yellow card) 28' (yellow-red card) 56'; Cennamo (yellow card) 75'; Edjenguélé (yellow card) 77'; Doležaj (yellow card) 86'; Charisteas (yellow card) 90+2'	Stadium: Zosimades Stadium; Attendance: 2173; Referee: Ilias Spathas

4 February 2012 20	Kerkyra	1–2	PAS Giannina	Kerkyra
17:15	Michos (yellow card) 4'; Jon Erice (yellow card) 51'; Kalantzis 55'; Kalantzis (yellow card) 60'	Report	Zaradoukas 20'; Lila (yellow card) 30' (yellow-red card) 69'; Vanderson (yellow card) 41'; Becerra 42'; Zaradoukas (yellow card) 63'; Pantos (yellow card) 76'	Stadium: Kerkyra Stadium; Attendance: 985; Referee: Michail Koukoulakis

11 February 2012 21	Panionios	0-0	PAS Giannina	Nea Smyrni
17:15	Omo (yellow card) 44'; Siovas (yellow card) 49'; Kuqi (yellow card) 65'; Mendrinos (yellow card) 75'	Report	Michail (yellow card) 55'; Patsatzoglou (yellow card) 73'; Kipouros (yellow card) 85'; Dasios (yellow card) 85'; Vanderson (yellow card) 88'	Stadium: Nea Smyrni Stadium; Attendance: 1576; Referee: Charalabos Kalogeropoulos

19 February 2011 22	PAS Giannina	1-2	Atromitos	Ioannina
15:00	Patsatzoglou (yellow card) 61'; Lila (yellow card) 69'; Bakayoko 75' (pen.); Georgiou (yellow card) 86'; Michail (yellow card) 90+2'	Report	Tatos 30'; Sfakianakis (yellow card) 48'; Skondras (yellow card) 66'; Mitroglou 70'; Dimoutsos (yellow card) 74'	Stadium: Zosimades Stadium; Attendance: 2356; Referee: Stavros Tritsonis

4 March 2012 23	Doxa Drama	1-0	PAS Giannina	Thessaloniki
17:15	Kyvelidis 7'; Vertzos (yellow card) 38'; Lima (yellow card) 43'; Aravidis (yellow card) 82'; Papadopoulos (yellow card) 84'; Konstantinos Dafkos (yellow card) 90+5'	Report	De Vincenti (yellow card) 76'; Vila (yellow card) 87'	Stadium: Kaftanzoglio Stadium; Attendance: 433; Referee: Alexandros Dimitropoulos

11 March 2012 24	PAS Giannina	2-0	Levadiakos	Ioannina
15:00	Becerra 22'; Dasios (yellow card) 33'; Dasios 61'; Andralas (yellow card) 68'; Tzimopoulos (yellow card) 89'	Report	Alexiou (yellow card) 6' (yellow-red card) 18'; Koutsopoulos (yellow card) 39'; Moulopoulos (yellow card) 53'; Zisopoulos (yellow card) 86'; Mendy (yellow card) 89'	Stadium: Zosimades Stadium; Attendance: 2448; Referee: Ioannis Delfakis

18 March 2012 25	Xanthi	1-2	PAS Giannina	Xanthi
15:00	Fliskas (yellow card) 41'; Vlachodimos (yellow card) 79'; Vlachodimos 88'	Report	Tzimopoulos (yellow card) 28'; Zambrella (yellow card) 41'; Dasios (yellow card) 52'; Becerra 58'; Becerra (yellow card) 73'; Pantos (yellow card) 79'; Vila 82'	Stadium: Xanthi FC Arena; Attendance: 898; Referee: Michail Koukoulakis

25 March 2012 26	PAS Giannina	1-1	Ergotelis	Ioannina
17:15	Dasios (yellow card) 25'; Kotsios (yellow card) 54'; Vila 59'; Tzimopoulos (yellow card) 90'	Report	Oliseh (yellow card) 14' (yellow-red card) 77'; Sarris (yellow card) 56' (yellow-red card) 82'; Leal (yellow card) 75'; Gialousis 90+1'; Koutsianikoulis (yellow card) 90+3'	Stadium: Zosimades Stadium; Attendance: 3633; Referee: Ilias Spathas

1 April 2012 27	PAOK	1-2	PAS Giannina	Thessaloniki
19:00	Papazoglou 71'	Report	Vila 7'; Vanderson (yellow card) 30'; Georgiou 70'; Andralas (yellow card) 82'; Kipouros (yellow card) 90+1'	Stadium: Toumba Stadium; Attendance: 9587; Referee: Georgios Daskalopoulos

8 April 2012 28	PAS Giannina	2-1	AEK Athens	Ioannina
19:00	Becerra (yellow card) 54'; Becerra 58'; Pantos (yellow card) 61'; Tzanis (yellow card) 77'; Kyriakos 84'	Report	Bougaidis (yellow card) 31'; Vargas (yellow card) 56'; Karabelas (yellow card) 66'; Vanderson 81' (o.g.); Georgeas (yellow card) 90+2'; Klonaridis (yellow card) 90+4'	Stadium: Zosimades Stadium; Attendance: 3730; Referee: Spyridon Selimos

18 April 2012 29	PAS Giannina	0-4	Olympiacos	Ioannina
19:00	Michail (yellow card) 40'; Becerra (yellow card) 90+2'	Report	Mirallas 53'; Djebbour 64', 71'; Papadopoulos (yellow card) 68'; Fetfatzidis 75'	Stadium: Zosimades Stadium; Attendance: 5198; Referee: Alexandros Dimitropoulos

22 April 2012 30	OFI	0–2	PAS Giannina	Heraklion
16:30	Pitsos (yellow card) 77'	Report	Tzanis 63'; Vila 72'; De Vincenti (yellow card) 90+2'	Stadium: Theodoros Vardinogiannis Stadium; Attendance: 1414; Referee: Ioannis Delfakis

=== Greek cup ===
==== Fourth round ====
22 December 2011 Fourth round	Diagoras	0-1	PAS Giannina	Rhodes
14:00	Poulopoulos (yellow card) 73'	Report	Cuevas 6'; Keita (yellow card) 73'; Tzanis (yellow card) 84'	Stadium: Diagoras Stadium; Attendance: unknown Referee: Giorgos Liachoudis

==== Fifth round ====
11 January 2012 Fifth round	PAS Giannina	1-4	Asteras Tripolis	Ioannina
16:00	Georgiou 75'; Giakos (yellow card) 77'; Michail (yellow card) 81'	Report	Hegon (yellow card) 32'; Formica (yellow card) 36'; Tsabouris 63'; Rayo 66', 90+2'; Juli 79'; Jacobo (yellow card) 85'	Stadium: Zosimades Stadium; Attendance: unknown Referee: Petros Konstantineas

== Statistics ==
=== Appearances ===
No.	Pos.	Nat.	Name	Greek Super League	Greek Cup	Total
No.	Pos.	Nat.	Name	Apps	Apps	Apps
1	GK	(Morocco)	Karim Fegrouche	9	0	9
2	RB	(Greece)	Georgios Dasios	13	2	15
3	DM	(Albania)	Andi Lila	21	0	21
4	CB	(Greece)	Ilias Kotsios	25	2	27
5	RB	(Greece)	Tasos Pantos	25	1	26
6	CB	(Greece)	Alexios Michail	17	2	19
7	RW	(Greece)	Tasos Kyriakos	17	2	19
8	CB	(Greece)	Themistoklis Tzimopoulos	20	2	22
9	FW	(Argentina)	Héctor Cuevas	4	1	5
10	FW	(Ivory Coast)	Ibrahima Bakayoko	24	1	25
11	CM	(Argentina)	Leandro Becerra	26	0	26
12	CM / CF	(Greece)	Evripidis Giakos	5	1	6
14	FW	(Albania)	Emiljano Vila	22	0	22
15	CM	(Argentina)	Tomas De Vincenti	23	1	24
16	DM / CB	(Greece)	Paraskevas Andralas	10	1	11
17	RW	(Greece)	Fotis Georgiou	28	1	29
18	CM	(Switzerland) (Italy)	Fabrizio Zambrella	10	0	10
21	CB	(Algeria) (France)	Ismaël Bouzid	12	0	12
22	FW	(Greece)	Christos Tzanis	15	2	17
23	CB	(Greece)	Marios Oikonomou	0	2	2
24	DM	(Senegal)	Paul Keita	6	1	7
26	RW	(Greece)	Manolis Skoufalis	12	1	13
27	LB	(Brazil) (Italy)	Vanderson Scardovelli	22	1	23
29	LW / RW	(Morocco)	Jaouad Zairi	8	0	8
30	GK	(Greece)	Charalambos Tabasis	0	0	0
34	LB	(Greece)	Giannis Zaradoukas	5	1	6
49	CM	(Greece)	Giannis Ioannou	0	0	0
71	GK	(Greece)	Fotis Kipouros	22	2	24
77	DM	(Greece)	Christos Patsatzoglou	16	1	17
93	FW	(Mali) (France)	Mamadou Bagayoko	1	0	1
	CB	(Paraguay) (Italy)	Ronald Huth	0	0	0

Super League Greece

=== Goalscorers ===
No.	Pos.	Nat.	Name	Greek Super League	Greek Cup	Total
No.	Pos.	Nat.	Name	Goals	Goals	Goals
10	FW	(Ivory Coast)	Ibrahima Bakayoko	7	0	7
11	CM	(Argentina)	Leandro Becerra	7	0	7
14	FW	(Albania)	Emiljano Vila	5	0	5
17	RW	(Greece)	Fotis Georgiou	2	1	3
7	RW	(Greece)	Tasos Kyriakos	2	0	2
8	CB	(Greece)	Themistoklis Tzimopoulos	1	0	1
9	FW	(Argentina)	Héctor Cuevas	0	1	1
15	CM	(Argentina)	Tomas De Vincenti	1	0	1
22	FW	(Greece)	Christos Tzanis	1	0	1
29	LW / RW	(Morocco)	Jaouad Zairi	1	0	1
34	LB	(Greece)	Giannis Zaradoukas	1	0	1
2	RB	(Greece)	Georgios Dasios	1	0	1
4	CB	(Greece)	Ilias Kotsios	1	0	1

Super League Greece

=== Clean sheets ===
No.	Pos.	Nat.	Name	Greek Super League	Greek Cup	Total
No.	Pos.	Nat.	Name	CS	CS	CS
1	GK	(Morocco)	Karim Fegrouche	3 (9)	0 (0)	3 (9)
30	GK	(Greece)	Charalambos Tabasis	0 (0)	0 (0)	0 (0)
71	GK	(Greece)	Fotis Kipouros	5 (22)	1 (2)	6 (24)

=== Disciplinary record ===
S	P	N	Name	Super League			Greek Cup			Total		
S	P	N	Name	Yellow card	Yellow-red card	Red card	Yellow card	Yellow-red card	Red card	Yellow card	Yellow-red card	Red card
1	GK	(Morocco)	Karim Fegrouche	2	0	0	0	0	0	2	0	0
2	RB	(Greece)	Georgios Dasios	4	0	0	0	0	0	4	0	0
3	DM	(Albania)	Andi Lila	7	1	0	0	0	0	7	1	0
4	CB	(Greece)	Ilias Kotsios	6	0	0	0	0	0	6	0	0
5	RB	(Greece)	Tasos Pantos	12	0	0	0	0	0	12	0	0
6	CB	(Greece)	Alexios Michail	3	0	0	1	0	0	4	0	0
7	RW	(Greece)	Tasos Kyriakos	2	0	0	0	0	0	2	0	0
8	CB	(Greece)	Themistoklis Tzimopoulos	8	0	0	0	0	0	8	0	0
11	CM	(Argentina)	Leandro Becerra	7	0	0	0	0	0	7	0	0
12	CM / CF	(Greece)	Evripidis Giakos	0	0	0	1	0	0	1	0	0
14	FW	(Albania)	Emiljano Vila	6	0	0	0	0	0	6	0	0
15	CM	(Argentina)	Tomas De Vincenti	8	0	0	0	0	0	8	0	0
16	DM / CB	(Greece)	Paraskevas Andralas	4	0	0	0	0	0	4	0	0
17	RW	(Greece)	Fotis Georgiou	3	0	0	0	0	0	3	0	0
18	CM	(Switzerland) (Italy)	Fabrizio Zambrella	1	0	0	0	0	0	1	0	0
21	CB	(Algeria) (France)	Ismaël Bouzid	5	0	0	0	0	0	5	0	0
22	FW	(Greece)	Christos Tzanis	1	0	0	1	0	0	2	0	0
24	DM	(Senegal)	Paul Keita	0	0	0	1	0	0	1	0	0
26	RW	(Greece)	Manolis Skoufalis	1	1	0	0	0	0	1	1	0
27	LB	(Brazil) (Italy)	Vanderson Scardovelli	5	0	0	0	0	0	5	0	0
34	LB	(Greece)	Giannis Zaradoukas	2	0	0	0	0	0	2	0	0
71	GK	(Greece)	Fotis Kipouros	2	0	0	0	0	0	2	0	0
77	DM	(Greece)	Christos Patsatzoglou	6	0	0	0	0	0	6	0	0

=== Best goal and MVP awards winners ===
MD	MVP award	Best goal award
5	-	Leandro Becerra
20	Fotis Kipouros	Leandro Becerra
27	Fotis Georgiou	-
28	Tasos Kyriakos	-
30	Emiljano Vila	-
