= List of Greek football transfers summer 2011 =

This is a list of Greek football transfers in the summer transfer window 2011 by club.

== Super League ==
=== AEK Athens ===
In:

Out:

| No. | Pos. | Nation | Player |
|---|---|---|---|
| 2 | DF | GRE | Giannis Kontoes (from (Greece) Panionios F.C.) |
| 47 | DF | GRE | Mavroudis Bougaidis (from (Greece) Aris) |
| 11 | FW | GRE | Dimitris Sialmas (from (Greece) PAS Giannina) |
| 92 | DF | GRE | Sokratis Tsoukalas (from (Italy) Palermo) |
| 23 | GK | GRE | Dimitrios Konstantopoulos (from (Greece) Kerkyra) |
| 12 | FW | GRE | Thomas Tsitas (from (Greece) Iraklis) |
| 88 | MF | GRE | Taxiarchis Fountas (from (Greece) Acheloos Neochoriou) |
| 17 | MF | GRE | Paul Katsetis (from (Australia) Blacktown City FC) |
| - | MF | GRE | Xenofon Fetsis (from (Greece) free agent) |
| 10 | MF | ESP | José Carlos (on loan from (Spain) Sevilla FC) |
| 6 | DF | ESP | Cala (on loan from (Spain) Sevilla FC) |
| 3 | DF | ISL | Elfar Freyr Helgason (from (Iceland) Breiðablik) |
| 22 | FW | ISL | Eiður Guðjohnsen (free agent) |
| 8 | FW | CMR | Steve Leo Beleck (on loan from (Italy) Udinese Calcio) |
| 21 | MF | COL | Fabián Vargas (free agent) |

| No. | Pos. | Nation | Player |
|---|---|---|---|
| - | DF | GRE | Dimitris Koutromanos (to (Greece) Panetolikos) |
| 92 | DF | GRE | Michalis Tsamourlidis (to A.O. Glyfada F.C.) |
| - | MF | GRE | Lefteris Intzoglou (to (Greece) Atromitos F.C.) |
| - | MF | GRE | Giorgos Paligiorgos (to (Greece) Ethnikos Asteras F.C.) |
| - | MF | GRE | Panagiotis Zorbas (to (Greece) OFI) |
| - | DF | GRE | Spyros Matentzidis (on loan to (Greece) Diagoras F.C.) |
| - | MF | GRE | Xenofon Fetsis (on loan to (Greece) A.O. Glyfada F.C.) |
| - | DF | GRE | Stamatis Kalamiotis (on loan to (Greece) Thrasyvoulos F.C.) |
| - | DF | GRE | Valentinos Vlachos (on loan to (Greece) Thrasyvoulos F.C.) |
| - | FW | GRE | Giorgos Nikoltsis (on loan to (Greece) Fokikos F.C.) |
| - | FW | GRE | Dimitris Froxylias (on loan to (Greece) Fokikos F.C.) |
| - | FW | ALB | Serxhio Abdurahmani (on loan to (Greece) Niki Volos F.C.) |
| 32 | MF | ARG | Ignacio Scocco (to (United Arab Emirates) Al Ain S.C.C.) |
| 23 | GK | ARG | Sebastián Saja (to (Argentina) Racing Club) |
| 18 | FW | ARG | Ismael Blanco (to (Mexico) San Luis F.C.) |
| 3 | DF | ARG | Cristian Nasuti (loan return to (Argentina) River Plate) |
| - | DF | ARG | Carlos Araujo (loan to (Argentina) Lanús) |
| 6 | DF | ESP | David Mateos (loan return to (Spain) Real Madrid) |
| 11 | MF | ESP | Miguel Marcos Madera (loan return to (England) Birmingham City) |
| - | GK | SRB | Milan Lukač (to (Serbia) OFK Beograd) |
| 26 | DF | CRO | Dino Drpić (to (Ukraine) FC Volyn Lutsk) |
| 8 | DF | BIH | Sanel Jahić (to (Cyprus) APOEL) |
| 13 | DF | URU | Claudio Dadomo (to (Greece) Ergotelis F.C.) |
| 20 | MF | BRA | Éder Luiz Lima de Souza (to (Brazil) Flamengo) |
| 39 | FW | MAR | Nabil Baha (to (Spain) CE Sabadell FC) |
| 21 | MF | SEN | Papa Bouba Diop (to (England) West Ham United F.C.) |
| 30 | MF | FRA | Joseph Agyriba (to (Greece) A.O. Glyfada F.C.) |

=== Aris ===
In:

Out:

| No. | Pos. | Nation | Player |
|---|---|---|---|
| 5 | FW | GRE | Dimitris Kotsonis (from (Greece) Paniliakos F.C.) |
| 7 | FW | ALG | Karim Soltani (from (Greece) Iraklis) |
| 10 | FW | MEX | Nery Castillo (from (Ukraine) FC Shakhtar Donetsk) |
| 11 | MF | GRE | Kostas Kapetanos (from (Greece) Olympiacos Volos) |
| -- | GK | SUI | Eldin Jakupović (from (Greece) Olympiacos Volos) |
| -- | MF | ESP | Noe Acosta (from (Greece) Olympiacos Volos) |
| -- | MF | ARG | Javier Umbides (from (Greece) Olympiacos Volos) |
| 22 | FW | GRE | Sakis Kanoulas (from (Greece) Anagennisi Epanomis F.C.) |
| 29 | FW | ROU | Victoraş Iacob (from (Greece) Iraklis) |
| 5 | MF | GRE | Emmanouil Papasterianos (from (Greece) Iraklis) |

| No. | Pos. | Nation | Player |
|---|---|---|---|
| 32 | MF | POR | Danilo Luís Hélio Pereira (loan return to (Italy) Parma F.C.) |
| 47 | DF | GRE | Mavroudis Bougaidis (to (Greece) AEK Athens F.C.) |
| 33 | MF | LTU | Deividas Česnauskis (to (Azerbaijan) FK Baku) |
| 3 | MF | ESP | Oriol Lozano (to (Spain) Real Murcia) |

=== Asteras Tripolis ===
In:

Out:

| No. | Pos. | Nation | Player |
|---|---|---|---|
| — | DF | ESP | Ximo Navarro (from (Spain) Valencia CF Mestalla) |
| — | GK | ESP | Jacobo Sanz Ovejero (from (Spain) Real Valladolid) |
| — | MF | ESP | Rubén Rayos (from (Spain) UE Lleida) |
| — | MF | ESP | Juli (from (Spain) Rayo Vallecano) |
| — | MF | ESP | Juanito (from (Spain) UD Almería) |
| — | MF | ESP | Fernando Usero (from (Spain) Córdoba CF) |
| — | MF | ESP | Jonathan Sesma (from (Spain) Córdoba CF) |
| — | FW | ARG | Emanuel Perrone (from (Cyprus) Anorthosis Famagusta) |
| — | DF | ARG | Lautaro Formica (from (Paraguay) Cerro Porteño) |
| — | MF | BRA | Hegon (from (Brazil) Avaí Futebol Clube) |
| — | DF | GRE | Athanasios Kostoulas (from (Greece) Skoda Xanthi) |

| No. | Pos. | Nation | Player |
|---|---|---|---|
| TBA | DF | GRE | Sokratis Fytanidis (to (Greece) Atromitos F.C.) |
| TBA | FW | GRE | Thanasis Papazoglou (to (Greece) PAOK) |
| TBA | MF | GRE | Kostas Fortounis (to (Germany) FC Kaiserslautern) |
| TBA | GK | GRE | Nikolaos Anastasopoulos (to (Greece) Kerkyra) |
| TBA | MF | FRA | Salim Arrache (to (Kuwait) Qadsia SC) |
| TBA | DF | BRA | Marcelo (to (Greece) AEL Kalloni) |
| TBA | MF | ARG | Adrián Bastía (to (Argentina) Club Atlético Colón) |
| TBA | GK | ARG | Matías Degra (to (Cyprus) AEL Limassol) |
| TBA | DF | ARG | Bruno Urribarri (to (Argentina) Club Atlético Colón) |
| TBA | FW | RUS | Vladislav Ivanov (to (Russia) FC Torpedo Moscow) |

=== Atromitos ===
In:

Out:

| No. | Pos. | Nation | Player |
|---|---|---|---|
| 11 | MF | SRB | Nikola Beljić (from (Greece) Panserraikos) |
| 30 | GK | CRO | Velimir Radman (from (Greece) Panserraikos) |
| 6 | DF | GRE | Sokratis Fytanidis (from (Greece) Asteras Tripolis) |
| 18 | DF | GRE | Kostas Giannoulis (from (Germany) F.C. Koln) |
| 23 | FW | GRE | Kostas Mitroglou (on loan from (Greece) Olympiacos) |
| 54 | MF | GRE | Giorgos Makris (from (Greece) Kerkyra) |
| 24 | DF | POR | Francisco Zuela (from (Russia) Kuban) |
| 8 | MF | GER | Denis Epstein (free agent) |
| 26 | MF | ARG | Miguel Sebastián Garcia (from (Greece) Iraklis) |
| 21 | MF | GRE | Elini Dimoutsos (from (Greece) Panathinaikos F.C.) |
| 7 | MF | GRE | Andreas Tatos (on loan from (Greece) Olympiacos) |

| No. | Pos. | Nation | Player |
|---|---|---|---|
| 4 | DF | POL | Marcin Baszczyński (to (Poland) Polonia Warszawa) |
| 26 | DF | BRA | Marcelo Oliveira (to (Cyprus) APOEL) |
| 7 | FW | SEN | Henri Camara (to (Greece) Panetolikos F.C.) |
| 6 | MF | GRE | Konstantinos Nebegleras (to (Greece) AEL) |
| 23 | GK | GRE | Chrisostomos Michailidis (to (Greece) AEL) |
| 3 | MF | GRE | Pashalis Melissas (to (Greece) Levadiakos F.C.) |

=== Doxa Drama ===
In:

Out:

| No. | Pos. | Nation | Player |
|---|---|---|---|
| - | MF | GRE | Christos Aravidis (from (Greece) Aris) |
| - | MF | GRE | Grigoris Pitsokos (from (Greece) Iraklis) |
| - | MF | GRE | Aristides Soiledis (from (Greece) Olympiacos) |
| - | MF | HUN | Gabor Eros (from (Bulgaria) PFC Lokomotiv Plovdiv) |
| - | DF | GRE | Theodoros Tripotseris (from (Greece) Levadiakos F.C.) |
| - | DF | BIH | Neven Markovic (from (Croatia) NK Zagreb) |
| - | GK | ESP | José Roca (from (Greece) Olympiacos Volos) |
| - | DF | GRE | Nikos Psychogios (from (Greece) Iraklis) |
| - | DF | GRE | Charalampos Brilakis (from (Greece) Trikala F.C.) |
| - | MF | GRE | Giorgos Moschakis (from (Greece) Panthrakikos) |
| - | DF | GRE | Charalampos Brilakis (from (Greece) Trikala F.C.) |
| - | MF | GRE | Georgios Katsikogiannis (on loan from (Greece) Olympiacos) |
| - | FW | GRE | Nikos Angeloudis (on loan from (Greece) Aris) |

| No. | Pos. | Nation | Player |
|---|---|---|---|
| - | FW | SRB | Marko Markovski (to (Greece) Skoda Xanthi) |
| - | DF | GRE | Giorgos Chatzizisis (to (Greece) Pierikos) |
| - | MF | GRE | Christos Chatzipantelidis (to (Cyprus) Nea Salamis Famagusta FC) |
| - | DF | GRE | Georgios Karakostas (to (Greece) AEL Kalloni) |
| - | DF | GRE | Dimitrios Geladaris (to (Greece) Veria F.C.) |
| - | MF | ESP | Antonio González Rodríguez (to (Greece) AEL) |

=== Iraklis ===
(relegated due to failing to obtain a license to participate in 2011–12 Superleague)

In:

Out:

| No. | Pos. | Nation | Player |
|---|---|---|---|
| - | FW | BOL | Edivaldo Hermoza (from (Bolivia) Naval) canceled |
| - | MF | GRE | Panagiotis Korbos (from (Greece) Trikala F.C.) |
| - | MF | GRE | Nikos Psychogios (loan return from (Greece) Olympiacos Volos) |
| - | GK | GRE | Loukas Apostolidis (from (Greece) Kerkyra) |

| No. | Pos. | Nation | Player |
|---|---|---|---|
| - | DF | GRE | Tasos Katsabis (retired) |
| - | MF | URU | Marcel Román (loan return to (Italy) Genoa C.F.C.) |
| - | MF | POR | Dani (to (Greece) Skoda Xanthi) |
| - | DF | URU | Pablo Lima (to (Argentina) Club Atlético Colón) |
| - | FW | GRE | Nikos Arabatzis (to (Greece) AEL) |
| - | FW | GRE | Thomas Tsitas (to (Greece) AEK Athens) |
| - | FW | ROU | Victoraș Iacob (to (Greece) Aris) |
| - | DF | NGA | Sani Kaita (loan return to (France) AS Monaco FC) |
| - | FW | ALG | Karim Soltani (to (Greece) Aris) |
| - | DF | ESP | Josemi (to (Spain) FC Cartagena) |
| - | MF | GRE | Emmanouil Papasterianos (to (Greece) Aris) |
| - | DF | GRE | Lazaros Fotias (to (Greece) AEL) |
| - | MF | GRE | Paschalis Voutsias (to (Greece) Panserraikos F.C.) |
| - | GK | GRE | Dimitrios Eleftheropoulos (Free agent) |
| - | GK | GRE | Georgios Bantis (Free agent) |
| - | DF | GRE | Petros Kanakoudis (Free agent) |
| - | MF | ARG | Pitu (Free agent) |
| - | FW | CMR | Louis Clément Ngwat-Mahop (Free agent) |
| - | DF | GRE | Stelios Iliadis (Free agent) |
| - | DF | BRA | Carlos César Matheus (Free agent) |
| - | MF | SVN | Mirnes Šišić (Free agent) |
| - | MF | FRA | Monsef Zerka (Free agent) |
| - | MF | ROU | Bogdan Mara (Free agent) |
| - | | | Robert Zot (Free agent) |

=== Kavala ===
(excluded from the League being involved in Koriopolis)

In:

Out:

| No. | Pos. | Nation | Player |
|---|---|---|---|
| TBA | GK | ROU | Mircea Bornescu (from (Romania) Rapid București) |
| TBA | DF | MKD | Aleksandar Vasoski (from (Germany) Eintracht Frankfurt) |
| TBA | MF | POL | Lukasz Mierzejewski (from (Poland) Cracovia) |
| TBA | DF | ROU | Alin Buleică (from (Romania) Universitatea Craiova) |
| TBA | FW | SRB | Danijel Aleksić (on loan from (Italy) Genoa) |

| No. | Pos. | Nation | Player |
|---|---|---|---|
| — | GK | CRO | Mario Galinovic (Free agent) |
| — | DF | BUL | Igor Tomašić (to (Cyprus) Anorthosis Famagusta) |
| — | MF | POR | Bruno Pereirinha (Free agent) |
| — | MF | SRB | Nemanja Vučićević (to (Cyprus) Anorthosis Famagusta) |
| — | MF | ARG | Leonel Ríos (Free agent) |
| — | DF | GRE | Dimitris Petkakis (to Panionios) |
| — | FW | ROU | Marius Niculae (loan return to (Romania) Dinamo București) |
| — | MF | BIH | Mirko Hrgović (Free agent) |
| — | DF | GRE | Lazaros Theodorelis (Free agent) |
| — | GK | ESP | Javier López Vallejo (Free agent) |
| — | DF | CRO | Vedran Ješe (Free agent) |
| — | GK | GRE | Emmanouel Apostolidis (Free agent) |
| — | MF | GRE | Christos Eleutheriadis (Free agent) |
| — | FW | FRA | Jean-Claude Darcheville (Free agent) |
| — | MF | GRE | Stefanos Siontis (Free agent) |
| — | GK | GRE | Theofanis Katergiannakis (Free agent) |
| — | FW | NGA | Benjamin Onwuachi (to (Cyprus) AEL Limassol) |
| — | DF | BRA | Douglão (to (Portugal) S.C. Braga) |
| — | MF | ALG | Djamel Abdoun (to (Greece) Olympiacos F.C.) |

=== Kerkyra ===
In:

Out:

| No. | Pos. | Nation | Player |
|---|---|---|---|
| 1 | GK | GRE | Nikolaos Anastasopoulos (from (Greece) Asteras Tripolis) |
| 4 | DF | GER | Timo Wenzel (from (Cyprus) Omonia Nicosia) |
| 11 | MF | TUR | Tümer Metin (from (Greece) AEL) |
| 13 | GK | MLT | Justin Haber (from (Hungary) Ferencvárosi) |
| 15 | GK | CRO | Mario Galinović (from (Greece) Panathinaikos) |
| 22 | MF | GHA | Abdul Osman (from (England) Northampton Town) |
| 28 | MF | ROU | Florin Lovin (from (Germany) TSV 1860 München) |

| No. | Pos. | Nation | Player |
|---|---|---|---|
| TBD | MF | GER | Denis Epstein (loan return to (Greece) Olympiacos F.C.) |
| — | MF | GRE | Ieroklis Stoltidis (Retired) |
| — | MF | GRE | Antonis Rikka (loan return (Greece) AEK Athens F.C.) |
| — | GK | GRE | Dimitrios Konstantopoulos ( (Greece) AEK Athens F.C.) |

=== Levadiakos ===
In:

Out:

| No. | Pos. | Nation | Player |
|---|---|---|---|
| - | MF | GRE | Dimitris Ioannou (from (Greece) Kerkyra) |
| - | MF | ARG | Lucas Favalli (from (Cyprus) Atromitos) |
| - | DF | GRE | Paschalis Melissas (from (Greece) Atromitos) |
| - | DF | FRA | Xavier Tomas (from (Greece) Olympiacos Volos) |
| - | DF | GRE | Evangelos Koutsopoulos (from (Cyprus) AEL Limassol) |
| - | MF | GRE | Giorgos Zisopoulos (from (Greece) Panthrakikos) |
| - | DF | URU | Agustin Viana (from (Uruguay) Club Atlético Bella Vista) |
| - | MF | GRE | Panagiotis Korbos (from (Greece) Atromitos) |
| - | MF | ARG | Alan Sanchez (from (Argentina) Boca Unidos) |
| - | MF | MNE | Petar Grbic (on loan from (Greece) Olympiacos) |
| - | MF | GRE | Panagiotis Korbos (from (Greece) Atromitos) |

| No. | Pos. | Nation | Player |
|---|---|---|---|
| TBD | MF | GRE | Giorgos Barkoglou (to (Greece) Kerkyra) |
| TBD | DF | GRE | Dimitrios Chaloulos (to (Greece) Pierikos) |
| TBD | MF | BRA | Luciano Mourao (to (Greece) Ethnikos Asteras F.C.) |
| TBD | FW | FRA | Vincent Ramael (to (Switzerland) Servette F.C.) |
| TBD | DF | GRE | Theodoros Tripotseris (to (Greece) Doxa Drama) |
| TBD | MF | GRE | Aristides Soiledis (loan return to (Greece) Olympiacos F.C.) |

=== Olympiacos ===
In:

Out:

| No. | Pos. | Nation | Player |
|---|---|---|---|
| 93 | MF | ALG | Djamel Abdoun (from (Greece) Kavala F.C.) |
| -- | DF | GRE | Giannis Zaradoukas (from (Greece) Olympiacos Volos) |
| 99 | GK | GRE | Iosif Daskalakis (from (Greece) Ergotelis F.C.) |
| 7 | MF | GRE | Andreas Tatos (from (Greece) Atromitos F.C.) |
| 77 | MF | CMR | Jean Makoun (loan from (England) Aston Villa F.C.) |
| 31 | MF | ESP | Pablo Orbaiz (loan from (Spain) Athletic Bilbao) |

| No. | Pos. | Nation | Player |
|---|---|---|---|
| 10 | FW | BRA | Diogo Luis Santo (loan to (Brazil) Santos) |
| 86 | MF | BRA | Chumbinho (loan to (Greece) OFI) |
| 7 | MF | GRE | Andreas Tatos (loan to (Greece) Atromitos F.C.) |
| 23 | MF | GRE | Kostas Mitroglou (loan to (Greece) Atromitos F.C.) |
| 11 | FW | ESP | Albert Riera (to (Turkey) Galatasaray) |

=== Olympiacos Volos ===
(excluded from the League being involved in Koriopolis)

In:

Out:

| No. | Pos. | Nation | Player |
|---|---|---|---|
| TBA | MF | FRA | Stéphane Darbion (from (France) FC Nantes) |
| TBA | MF | SVK | Igor Obert (from (Slovakia) FK DAC 1904 Dunajská Streda) |
| TBA | FW | MLT | Andre Schembri (from (Hungary) Ferencvárosi TC) |

| No. | Pos. | Nation | Player |
|---|---|---|---|
| -- | MF | GRE | Kostas Kapetanos (to (Greece) Aris) |
| -- | FW | HUN | Krisztian Nemeth (loan return to (Greece) Olympiacos F.C.) |
| -- | FW | MLT | Andre Schembri (to (Greece) Panionios F.C.) |
| -- | GK | SUI | Eldin Jakupović (to (Greece) Aris) |
| -- | MF | ESP | Noe Acosta (to (Greece) Aris) |
| -- | MF | ARG | Javier Umbides (to (Greece) Aris) |
| -- | FW | ARG | Vicente Monje (to (Greece) Olympiacos F.C.) |
| -- | DF | GRE | Giannis Zaradoukas (to (Greece) Olympiacos F.C.) |
| -- | FW | GRE | Ilias Solakis (to (Greece) Asteras Tripolis) |
| -- | FW | SVK | Mário Breška (to (Greece) Asteras Tripolis) |
| -- | DF | SVK | Peter Doležaj (to (Greece) Panetolikos F.C.) |
| -- | MF | FRA | Stéphane Darbion (to (Greece) Skoda Xanthi) |
| -- | MF | ARG | Leandro Alvarez (to (Greece) Asteras Tripolis) |
| -- | DF | HUN | Zoltán Szélesi (to (Netherlands) N.E.C.) |
| -- | DF | GRE | Vaggelis Gotovos (to (Greece) Niki Volos F.C.) |
| -- | MF | GRE | Efstathios Rokas (to (Greece) Panionios F.C.) |
| -- | MF | GRE | Pavlos Mitropoulos (to (Greece) Panetolikos F.C.) |
| -- | FW | ARG | Juan Eduardo Martín (to (Greece) Kerkyra) |
| -- | FW | GRE | Nikolaos Psychogios (to (Greece) Doxa Drama F.C.) |

=== Panathinaikos ===
In:

Out:

Note: Flags indicate national team as defined under FIFA eligibility rules; some limited exceptions apply. Players may hold more than one non-FIFA nationality.

| No. | Pos. | Nation | Player |
|---|---|---|---|
| 36 | MF | GRE | Sotiris Leontiou (loan return from (Greece) Ilioupoli F.C.) |
| 18 | DF | SWE | Mattias Bjärsmyr (loan return from (Norway) Rosenborg BK) |
| 6 | MF | ESP | Vitolo (free agent) |
| 9 | FW | ESP | Toche (free agent) |
| 14 | FW | GHA | Quincy Owusu-Abeyie (on loan from (Qatar) Al-Sadd) |
| 17 | MF | POR | Zeca (from (Portugal) Vitória F.C.) |
| 71 | FW | HUN | Gergely Rudolf (on loan from (Italy) Genoa) |

Note: Flags indicate national team as defined under FIFA eligibility rules; some limited exceptions apply. Players may hold more than one non-FIFA nationality.

| No. | Pos. | Nation | Player |
|---|---|---|---|
| - | MF | BRA | Marcelo Mattos (to (Brazil) Botafogo) |
| 15 | MF | BRA | Gilberto Silva (to (Brazil) Grêmio) |
| - | DF | BRA | Gabriel (to (Brazil) Grêmio) |
| - | FW | GRE | Vangelis Mantzios (free agent) |
| - | GK | CRO | Mario Galinovic (free agent) |
| 14 | FW | ESP | Luis García Sanz (to (Mexico) Puebla) |
| 10 | FW | FRA | Sidney Govou (to (France) Evian) |
| 9 | FW | FRA | Djibril Cissé (to (Italy) S.S. Lazio) |
| 12 | DF | RSA | Bryce Moon (to (South Africa) SuperSport United F.C.) |
| 1 | GK | GRE | Alexandros Tzorvas (to (Italy) Palermo) |
| 21 | MF | GRE | Elini Dimoutsos (to (Greece) Atromitos) |

=== Panetolikos ===
In:

Out:

| No. | Pos. | Nation | Player |
|---|---|---|---|
| TBA | FW | SEN | Henri Camara (from (Greece) Atromitos F.C.) |
| TBA | DF | GRE | Dimitris Koutromanos (from (Greece) AEK Athens) |
| TBA | MF | GRE | Hussein Mumin (from (Greece) PAOK) |
| TBA | DF | GRE | Stefanos Siontis (from (Greece) Kavala F.C.) |
| TBA | FW | GRE | Angelos Charisteas (from (Germany) FC Schalke 04) |
| TBA | FW | SEN | Mouhamadou Seye (from (Slovakia) Dukla Banská Bystrica) |
| TBA | GK | MNE | Srđan Blažić (from (Belgium) Standard Liège) |
| TBA | DF | GHA | David Addy (on loan from (Portugal) F.C. Porto) |
| TBA | FW | FRA | Habib Bamogo (from (France) OGC Nice) |
| TBA | MF | CMR | Valéry Mézague (from (France) Vannes OC) |

| No. | Pos. | Nation | Player |
|---|---|---|---|
| 99 | FW | ALB | Mario Gurma (to (Italy) A.C. Reggiana 1919) |
| 9 | FW | GRE | Vaggelis Kaounos (Free agent) |

=== Panionios ===
In:

Out:

| No. | Pos. | Nation | Player |
|---|---|---|---|
| — | DF | GRE | Dimitris Petkakis (from (Greece) Kavala) |
| — | FW | MLT | Andre Schembri (from (Greece) Olympiacos Volos) |

| No. | Pos. | Nation | Player |

=== PAOK ===
In:

Out:

| No. | Pos. | Nation | Player |
|---|---|---|---|
| 2 | DF | GRE | Alexis Apostolopoulos (loan return from (Greece) Anagennisi Giannitsa) |
| 6 | MF | GRE | Dimitris Stamou (from (Greece) Iraklis) |
| -- | DF | GRE | Giorgos Katsikas (from (Greece) Iraklis) |
| 7 | MF | GRE | Giorgos Georgiadis (from (Greece) Panserraikos) |
| 10 | MF | BRA | Juliano Spadacio (from (Romania) Rapid București) |
| 11 | MF | FRA | Bertrand Robert (from (Greece) Panthrakikos) |
| 25 | MF | ROU | Costin Lazăr (from (Romania) Rapid București) |
| 60 | DF | BRA | Leonardo (from (Greece) Olympiacos F.C.) |
| 71 | GK | GRE | Panagiotis Glikos (loan return from (Greece) Agrotikos Asteras F.C.) |
| 99 | FW | GRE | Apostolos Giannou (from (Greece) Kavala F.C.) |
| -- | MF | GRE | Christos Kostikidis (from (Germany) Borussia Mönchengladbach) |
| -- | FW | GRE | Lazaros Moisiadis (end loan from (Greece) Apollon Kalamarias) |

| No. | Pos. | Nation | Player |
|---|---|---|---|
| 6 | MF | ESP | Vitolo (to (Greece) Panathinaikos F.C.) |
| 7 | MF | MAR | Nabil El Zhar (loan return to (Spain) Levante F.C.) |
| 11 | FW | BIH | Zlatan Muslimovic (Free agent) |
| 19 | MF | GRE | Vasilios Koutsianikoulis (to (Greece) Ergotelis F.C.) |
| 31 | FW | ARG | Lucio Filomeno (to (Argentina) Atlético de Rafaela) |
| 37 | MF | GRE | Vangelis Georgiou (to (Greece) Anagennisi Epanomi F.C.) |
| 36 | DF | ITA | Mirko Savini (Free agent) |
| 26 | MF | ALB | Ergys Kace (on loan to (Greece) Anagennisi Epanomi F.C.) |
| 30 | GK | GRE | Fotis Koutzavasilis (on loan to (Greece) Panserraikos F.C.) |
| 22 | GK | GRE | Asterios Giakoumis (on loan to (Greece) Agrotikos Asteras F.C.) |
| 23 | DF | GRE | Eleftherios Sakellariou (on loan to (Greece) AO Kerkyra) |
| 24 | DF | GRE | Panagiotis Kourdakis (loan to (Greece) Anagennisi Epanomi F.C.) |
| 39 | FW | GRE | Lazaros Moisiadis (loan to (Greece) Apollon Kalamarias F.C.) |
| — | DF | MNE | Luka Petričević (on loan to (Greece) Agrotikos Asteras F.C.) |
| — | DF | GRE | Aggelos Karantasiadis (on loan to (Greece) Apollon Kalamarias F.C.) |
| — | MF | GRE | Giorgos Paralikis (on loan to (Greece) Anagennisi Epanomi F.C.) |
| — | MF | GRE | Nikolaos Skempis (on loan to (Greece) Apollon Kalamarias F.C.) |
| — | MF | GRE | Triantafyllos Savidis (on loan to (Greece) Oikonomos Tsaritsani F.C.) |
| — | MF | GRE | Grigoris Efthimiadis (on loan to (Greece) Makedonikos F.C.) |

=== PAS Giannina ===
In:

Out:

| No. | Pos. | Nation | Player |
|---|---|---|---|
| 1 | GK | MAR | Karim Fegrouche (from (Morocco) Wydad AC Casablanca) |
| 3 | DF | ALB | Andi Lila (from (Albania) KF Tirana) |
| 17 | MF | GRE | Fotis Georgiou (from Diagoras F.C.) |
| 14 | MF | ALB | Emiljano Vila (from (Croatia) Dinamo Zagreb) |
| 11 | MF | ARG | Leandro Becerra (from (Argentina) Atlético Tucumán) |
| 29 | MF | MAR | Jaouad Zairi (from (Greece) Olympiacos) |

| No. | Pos. | Nation | Player |
|---|---|---|---|
| 10 | FW | GRE | Dimitris Sialmas (to (Greece) AEK Athens F.C.) |

=== Skoda Xanthi ===
In:

Out:

| No. | Pos. | Nation | Player |
|---|---|---|---|
| 70 | MF | ROU | Emil Dică (from (Romania) CFR Cluj) |
| 17 | FW | GRE | Panagiotis Vlachodimos (from (Germany) VfB Stuttgart II) |
| 66 | MF | POR | Daniel da Silva Soares (from (Greece) Iraklis) |
| 1 | GK | FRA | Jody Viviani (from (France) Grenoble) |
| 6 | MF | BRA | Edimar (from (Romania) CFR Cluj) |
| 15 | MF | ROU | Bogdan Mara (from (Greece) Iraklis) |
| 8 | MF | FRA | Stéphane Darbion (from (Greece) Olympiacos Volos) |

| No. | Pos. | Nation | Player |
|---|---|---|---|
| 28 | DF | GRE | Athanasios Kostoulas (to (Greece) Asteras Tripolis) |
| 37 | FW | ZAM | Christopher Katongo (to (China) Henan Construction F.C.) |
| 6 | MF | NED | George Boateng (to (England) Nottingham Forest) |
| 3 | DF | ENG | Jordan Stewart (to (England) Millwall FC) |
| 29 | FW | ROU | Mugurel Buga (to (Romania) FC Brașov) |
| 13 | DF | NGA | Olubayo Adefemi (dead) |
