= 2005–06 Kategoria Superiore =

Kategoria Superiore
- Season: 2005–06
- Dates: 27 August 2005 – 13 May 2006
- Champions: Elbasani; 2nd Albanian title
- Relegated: Skënderbeu; Lushnja
- Champions League: Elbasani
- UEFA Cup: Tirana; Dinamo Tirana
- Intertoto Cup: Partizani
- Matches: 180
- Goals: 413 (2.29 per match)
- Top goalscorer: Hamdi Salihi (29 goals)

The 2005–06 Kategoria Superiore was the 70th season of top-tier football in Albania and the eighth season under the name Kategoria Superiore.

== Teams ==
=== Stadia and last season ===
Locations of the 2005–06 Kategoria Superiore teams

Team	Location	Stadium	Capacity	Last season
Besa	Kavajë	Besa Stadium	8,000	Kategoria e Parë
Dinamo Tirana	Tirana	Qemal Stafa Stadium (Note: Dinamo Tirana, Partizani and Tirana all shared the Qemal Stafa Stadium as well as the Selman Stërmasi Stadium.)	19,700	3rd
Elbasani	Elbasan	Ruzhdi Bizhuta Stadium	15,000	2nd
Lushnja	Lushnjë	Abdurrahman Roza Haxhiu Stadium	12,000	7th
Partizani	Tirana	Qemal Stafa Stadium	19,700	8th
Skënderbeu	Korçë	Skënderbeu Stadium	12,000	Kategoria e Parë
Shkumbini	Peqin	Shkumbini Stadium	6,000	6th
Teuta	Durrës	Niko Dovana Stadium	12,040	5th
Tirana	Tirana	Qemal Stafa Stadium	19,700	Champions
Vllaznia	Shkodër	Loro Boriçi Stadium	15,000	4th

== League table ==
Pos	Team	Pld	W	D	L	GF	GA	GD	Pts	Qualification or relegation
1	Elbasani (C)	36	21	10	5	50	22	+28	73	Qualification for the Champions League first qualifying round
2	Tirana	36	17	11	8	54	33	+21	62	Qualification for the UEFA Cup first qualifying round (Note: Tirana qualified for the UEFA Cup first qualifying round by winning the 2005–06 Albanian Cup, therefore forfeiting their UEFA Intertoto Cup first round place that they had won.)
3	Dinamo Tirana	36	17	10	9	53	35	+18	61	Qualification for the UEFA Cup first qualifying round
4	Partizani	36	18	6	12	51	35	+16	60	Qualification for the Intertoto Cup first round
5	Besa	36	13	7	16	49	42	+7	46	
6	Vllaznia	36	13	6	17	39	45	−6	45	
7	Shkumbini	36	12	7	17	31	49	−18	43	
8	Teuta	36	11	9	16	32	45	−13	42	
9	Skënderbeu (R)	36	12	6	18	33	50	−17	42	Relegation to the 2006–07 Kategoria e Parë (Note: Teuta and Skënderbeu finished the season level on points so the Albanian Football Association decided to organise a playoff game to determine which side will be relegated to the Kategoria e Parë.)
10	Lushnja (R)	36	5	10	21	22	58	−36	25	Relegation to the 2006–07 Kategoria e Parë

Source: Albanian Football Association (in Albanian), RSSSF.org
Rules for classification: 1) points; 2) points in head-to-head matches; 3) goal difference in head-to-head matches; 4) goals scored in head-to-head matches; 5) total goal difference; 6) total goals scored; 7) draw
(C) Champions; (R) Relegated

== Results ==
Each team plays every opponent four times, twice at home and twice away, for a total of 36 games.

=== First half of season ===
Home \ Away	BES	DIN	ELB	LUS	PAR	SKË	SKU	TEU	TIR	VLL
Besa		3–0	0–1	0–0	4–1	4–0	2–1	1–0	1–1	0–1
Dinamo	2–2		0–0	3–0	1–2	3–1	3–1	4–0	3–3	3–0
Elbasani	1–0	3–0		4–0	0–1	3–1	2–0	2–1	1–0	2–0
Lushnja	1–1	2–2	0–2		2–1	2–1	3–2	0–0	0–1	1–3
Partizani	1–1	2–1	1–0	2–0		3–0	1–0	3–0	1–0	2–0
Skënderbeu	2–0	0–1	1–0	1–1	2–1		3–0	1–0	4–3	1–0
Shkumbini	1–0	0–2	1–2	1–0	2–1	2–1		2–1	1–1	0–0
Teuta	0–2	0–1	1–1	1–0	1–2	1–1	2–1		1–0	3–0
Tirana	1–1	1–1	1–1	1–0	1–0	3–0	4–4	2–1		2–0
Vllaznia	0–3	1–1	0–0	3–0	1–0	2–1	5–0	3–1	1–2	

Source: Albanian Football Association
Legend: Blue = home team win; Yellow = draw; Red = away team win.

=== Second half of season ===
Home \ Away	BES	DIN	ELB	LUS	PAR	SKË	SKU	TEU	TIR	VLL
Besa		0–1	0–2 (Note: Match awarded.)	6–0	2–1	2–0	2–0	1–4	0–2	1–0
Dinamo	3–2		1–1	0–1	3–0	1–0	0–0	2–0	1–1	2–1
Elbasani	2–1	1–1		1–0	1–1	2–1	2–0	2–0	1–0	1–0
Lushnja	1–0	1–4	2–4		1–1	1–1	0–1	0–0	0–0	0–1
Partizani	3–1	1–0	2–0	3–0		3–1	3–0	4–1	2–2	2–2
Skënderbeu	0–2	1–0	0–0	2–1	0–0		0–2	1–0	1–0	2–1
Shkumbini	1–0	0–1	0–0	2–1	2–0	2–1		0–2	0–1	1–0
Teuta	2–1	1–0	0–0	1–1	1–0	1–1	0–0		0–4	3–1
Tirana	1–1	3–0	2–3	1–0	1–0	2–0	3–1	0–1		2–1
Vllaznia	5–2	0–2	3–2	1–0	1–0	1–0	0–0	1–1	0–2	

Source: Albanian Football Association
Legend: Blue = home team win; Yellow = draw; Red = away team win.

== Playoffs ==
=== Relegation playoff ===
17 May 2006

Skënderbeu	0–1	Teuta
		Duro 60'

Qemal Stafa Stadium, Tirana
Referee: Mauro Bergonzi (Italy)

== Season statistics ==
=== Top goalscorers ===
Rank	Player	Club	Goals
1	(Albania) Hamdi Salihi	Tirana	26
2	(Senegal) El Hadji Goudjabi	Dinamo Tirana	15
3	(Albania) Skerdi Bejzade	Elbasani	13
3	(Albania) Vioresin Sinani	Vllaznia	13
5	(Albania) Oriand Abazaj	Shkumbini	9
5	(Albania) Olgert Stafa	Shkumbini	9
7	(Albania) Arbër Abilaliaj	Partizani	8
7	(Albania) Migen Memelli	Skënderbeu	8
7	(Republic of the Congo) Herby Fortunat	Besa	8
10	(Albania) Emiliano Veliaj	Besa	7
10	(Albania) Dorian Bylykbashi	Partizani	7
10	(Albania) Bledar Mançaku	Teuta	7
