= Jozef Kožlej =

Slovak footballer

Personal information
- Full name: Jozef Kožlej
- Date of birth: 8 July 1973 (age 53)
- Place of birth: Stropkov, Czechoslovakia
- Height: 1.84 m (6 ft 0 in)
- Position: Forward

Youth career
- 1981–1989: MŠK Tesla Stropkov
- 1989–1990: Tatran Prešov

Senior career*
Years	Team	Apps	(Gls)
1990–1992	Tatran Prešov	48	(8)
1992–1994	Sparta Prague	48	(11)
1995	Hradec Králové	1	(0)
1995–1996	Viktoria Žižkov	39	(7)
1996–1998	Košice	71	(43)
1998–1999	Greuther Fürth	14	(0)
1999–2000	Košice	31	(9)
2000–2003	Olympiakos Nicosia	76	(55)
2003–2006	Omonia	67	(32)
2006	Anorthosis Famagusta	12	(3)
2006–2008	AEL	27	(3)
2008–2009	Thrasyvoulos	24	(5)
2009–2010	Olympiakos Nicosia	16	(3)
2010	Thrasyvoulos	10	(1)
Total		484	(180)

International career
1992–2005	Slovakia	27	(3)
- * Club domestic league appearances and goals

Jozef Kožlej (born 8 July 1973) is a Slovak retired professional footballer who played as a forward. He played in Czechoslovakia, Germany, Greece and Cyprus.

== Club career ==
Born in Stropkov, Kožlej began playing youth football for Tesla Stropkov and 1. FC Tatran Prešov. He is well known for his excellent goal-scoring ability and holds the all-time record among Slovak footballers.

He scored AEL's first goal in the 2007 Greek Cup Final against Panathinaikos with a great header; Larissa won 2–1 with the second goal being scored by Henry Antchouet. He arguably spent his most productive seasons in terms of goals scored at Olympiakos Nicosia and has returned to this club to finish his career which occurred in the end of January 2010.

== International career ==
Kožlej appeared in 27 matches for the senior Slovakia national football team from 1992 to 2005.

== Career statistics ==
=== International ===
Appearances and goals by national team and year
National team	Year	Apps	Goals
Slovakia	1992	1	0
Slovakia	1993	–	
Slovakia	1994	–	
Slovakia	1995	–	
Slovakia	1996	1	0
Slovakia	1997	10	1
Slovakia	1998	3	0
Slovakia	1999	3	0
Slovakia	2000	–	
Slovakia	2001	–	
Slovakia	2002	5	2
Slovakia	2003	3	0
Slovakia	2004	–	
Slovakia	2005	1	0
Total		27	3

Scores and results list Slovakia's goal tally first, score column indicates score after each Kolžlej goal.

List of international goals scored by Jozef Kožlej
No.	Date	Venue	Opponent	Score	Result	Competition
1	2 February 1997	Estadio Félix Capriles, Cochabamba, Bolivia	Bolivia	1–0	1–0	Friendly
2	14 May 2002	Futbal Tatran Arena, Prešov, Slovakia	Uzbekistan	2–0	4–1	Friendly
3	14 May 2002	Futbal Tatran Arena, Prešov, Slovakia	Uzbekistan	3–1	4–1	Friendly

== Honours ==
AEL

- Greek Cup: 2006–07

Individual

- Slovak Super Liga Top Scorer: 1996–97
