= Andi Lila =

Albanian footballer

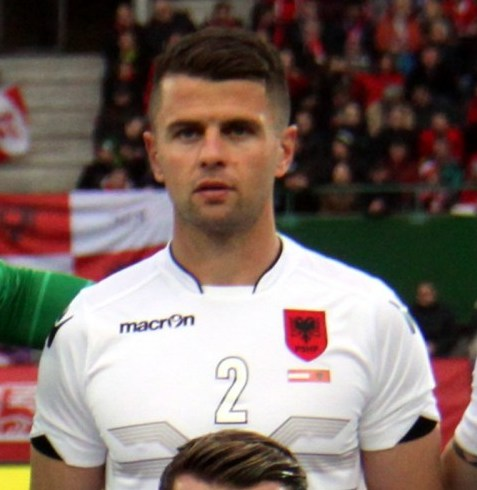
- Lila with Albania in 2016

Personal information
- Date of birth: 12 February 1986 (age 40)
- Place of birth: Kavajë, Albania
- Height: 1.85 m (6 ft 1 in)
- Position: Defensive midfielder

Youth career
- 2000–2003: Besa Kavajë

Senior career*
Years	Team	Apps	(Gls)
2002–2007	Besa Kavajë	83	(1)
2007	Iraklis	3	(0)
2007–2008	Besa Kavajë	29	(0)
2008–2011	Tirana	78	(11)
2011–2019	PAS Giannina	163	(7)
2015	→ Parma (loan)	13	(2)
2019–2020	Tirana	0	(0)
Total		369	(21)

International career
2002–2003	Albania U17	9	(0)
2003–2005	Albania U19	4	(0)
2006–2007	Albania U21	9	(0)
2007–2018	Albania	70	(0)
- * Club domestic league appearances and goals

Andi Lila (Albanian pronunciation: [ˈandi ˈlila]; born 12 February 1986) is an Albanian former professional footballer who played as a defensive midfielder. He was a versatile player, having spent his early career as a full-back.

Lila began his senior career at his hometown club Besa Kavajë before moving to Greek side Iraklis in the Super League Greece. He later returned to Besa Kavajë and went on to play for Tirana, winning the 2008–09 Albanian Superliga and 2010–11 Albanian Cup, and spent a significant period at Greek top-flight side PAS Giannina, including a brief loan spell at Italian Serie A side Parma. Lila made over 150 appearances in Greece's first division and ended his playing career at Tirana in 2020 due to injury.

Lila has represented Albania at under-17, under-19, under-21 and senior levels, earning 70 caps for the senior side from 2007 to 2017. He was part of the squad that qualified for UEFA Euro 2016, Albania's first appearance at a major tournament, and played in the historic 1–0 win against Romania in the group stage. Lila also featured in qualifying campaigns and key matches, including Albania's first-ever victory over Portugal in 2014 in the opening Euro 2016 qualifying, and was involved in the controversial 2014 incident in Belgrade against Serbia during the same competition.

== Club career ==
=== Besa Kavajë ===
Lila started his career with his hometown club, Besa Kavajë, making his debut at age 16 in the 2002–03 Albanian Superliga season on 14 December 2002 against Teuta Durrës, coming on as a substitute at half-time in a 5–0 defeat. He made 11 league appearances that season.

In the 2003–04 Albanian Superliga, Lila made 10 appearances as Besa Kavajë was relegated.

The following season in 2004–05 Kategoria e Parë, he established himself as a regular starter, playing 24 league matches as Besa won the championship and secured promotion back to Superliga.

He scored his first top-flight goal on 21 January 2006 in a 2–1 home win over Partizani during the 2005–06 Albanian Superliga. Lila made 29 league appearances that season, while Besa Kavajë finished fifth in the league standings.

He made nine appearances in the first half of the 2006–07 Albanian Superliga before leaving the club.

=== Iraklis ===
Lila transferred to Iraklis in January 2007, joining fellow Albanians Enea Koliçi, Ervis Kraja and Indrit Fortuzi. He debuted on 11 March 2007 against Aris Saloniki, starting at right-back and receiving a second yellow card at half-time. He made three league appearances before returning to Besa Kavajë.

=== Return to Besa Kavajë ===
After returning, Lila became team captain. He played in the 2007 Albanian Supercup against Tirana on 17 August 2007, losing 4–2. Lila made his first continental appearance on 30 August 2007 against Litex Lovech in the UEFA Cup Second qualifying round, losing 3–0. He made 29 league appearances in the 2007–08 Albanian Superliga as Besa finished third.

His final match for Besa was on 12 July 2008 against Grasshopper in the Intertoto Cup Second Round, losing 3–0.

Shortly after, he transferred to Tirana on 21 July 2008.

=== Tirana ===
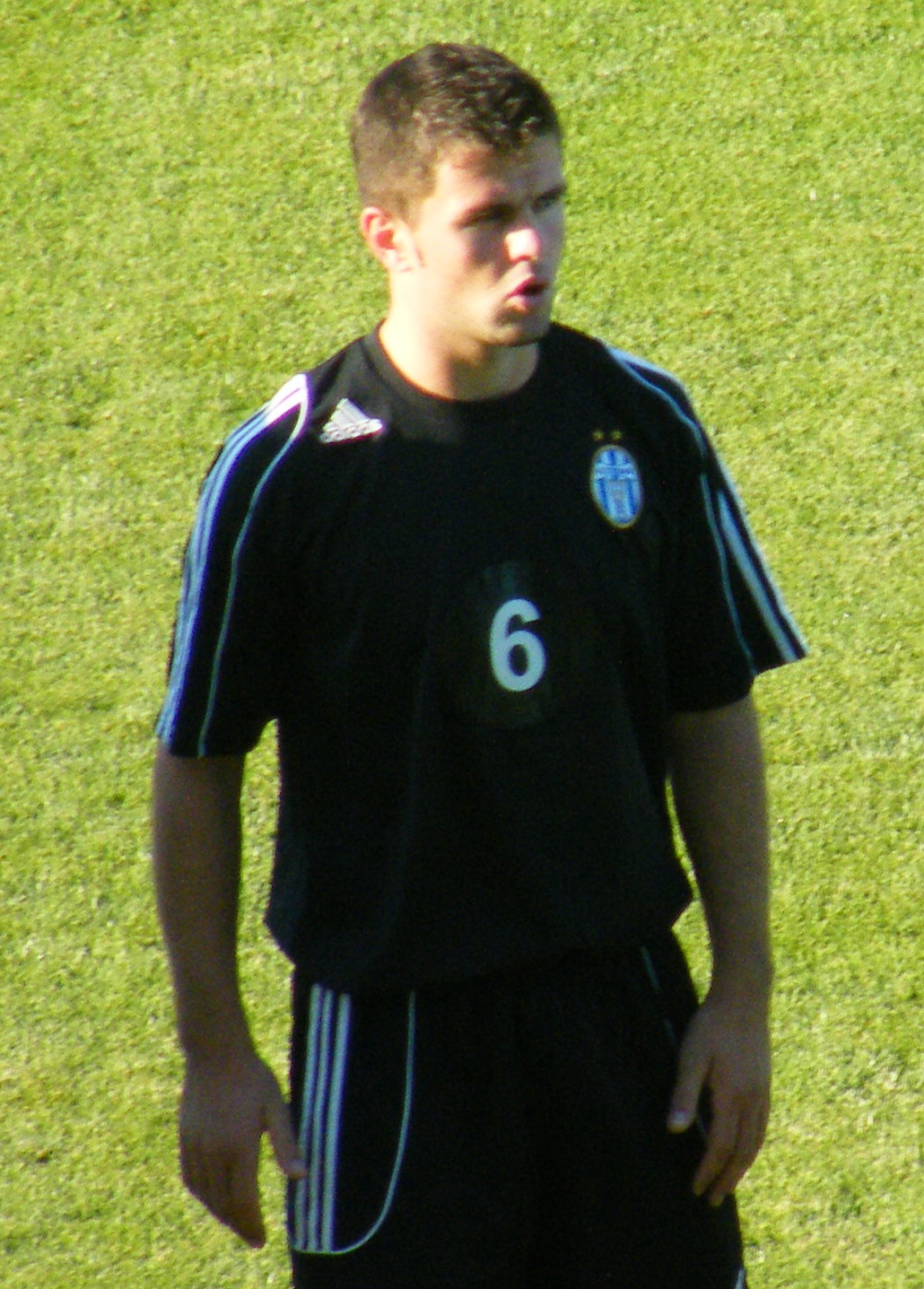
Lila with KF Tirana in 2010.

Lila made his debut for Tirana on 24 August 2008 against Vllaznia, playing the full 90 minutes in a 0–0 draw. He scored his first goal for the club on 14 September in his third appearance, netting in a 2–1 victory over Partizani in the capital derby. A week later, Lila scored again in a 2–0 away win against Apolonia. During the 2008–09 Albanian Superliga season, Lila was a regular starter, making 28 appearances and scoring four goals. Tirana won the league title for the 24th time in their history, finishing four points ahead of Vllaznia. Tirana also reached the final of the 2008–09 Albanian Cup, where the team was defeated 2–1 by Flamurtari Vlorë, with Lila an unused substitute.

Lila began his second season with Tirana on 15 July 2009 by making his European debut against Stabæk in the first leg of the 2009–10 UEFA Champions League first qualifying round. He also started the return leg, as Tirana were eliminated following a 4–0 defeat, losing 5–1 on aggregate. On 16 August 2009, Lila won his second trophy with Tirana, the 2009 Albanian Supercup, as the team defeated Flamurtari Vlorë 1–0. In the opening match of the 2009–10 Albanian Superliga on 23 August 2009, Lila conceded a penalty and was sent off in the 31st minute as Tirana were defeated 3–1 by Flamurtari. He made a total of 24 league appearances and scored one goal, as Tirana finished the season in third place.

In the 2010–11 UEFA Europa League qualifying rounds in July 2010, Lila played every minute of the first two qualifying rounds, as Tirana advanced past Zalaegerszeg 1–0 after extra time in the first round, before being eliminated in the second round by Utrecht despite Lila scoring in the second leg, with a 5–1 aggregate defeat. Lila began the 2011–12 Albanian Superliga season on 22 August 2011 by scoring the equalising goal in a 1–1 draw against Elbasani. On 31 January 2011, he scored in a 2–1 away victory over Dinamo Tirana. He made a total of 26 league appearances and scored six goals, as Tirana finished the season in fifth place. On 23 May 2011, Lila featured in the 2011 Albanian Cup final, which Tirana won against Dinamo after a penalty shoot-out, securing the club's qualification for European competition.

=== PAS Giannina ===
Lila completed a transfer to Greek side PAS Giannina on 24 June 2011 by signing a three-year contract worth €200,000 plus bonuses.

He was given squad number 3 and made his competitive debut on 27 August 2011 by starting in the goalless draw against Aris in the opening week of the 2011–12 Super League Greece. In his first full season at the Ajax of Epirus, Lila made 21 league appearances as the team finished eighth in the championship. With eight yellow cards, he recorded the second-worst disciplinary record in the squad.

Lila began his second season on 25 August 2012, playing in a 0–0 draw against Platanias at the Zosimades Stadium. He made his first Greek Cup appearance on 29 November 2012 in a 1–0 win against Panserraikos in the first leg of third round. His first goals for the club came on 8 December, when he scored the opener in a 2–0 away win against Kerkyra. His second goal of the season followed on 24 January 2013 in the second leg of the Greek Cup against Fostiras, helping PAS Giannina secure a 3–2 victory and progress to the quarter-finals. He finished the season with 35 appearances in all competitions, as PAS Giannina placed fifth in the league and were eliminated by Olympiacos in the Greek Cup quarter-finals, once again registering the second-worst disciplinary record within the team.

On 12 July 2014, Lila confirmed that his contract with PAS Giannina had expired and that he was set to join Croatian side HNK Rijeka, however, he later chose to remain at PAS Giannina, signing a new three-year contract with the club.

==== Loan to Parma ====
On 28 December 2014, Lila joined Serie A side Parma on loan. The transfer became official on 1 January 2015, when the transfer window reopened. During his presentation, Lila described the move to Serie A as a dream come true. On 12 January, Parma announced that the deal included an option to buy, amid the club's ongoing financial difficulties.

He made his debut on 14 January 2015 in the Coppa Italia match against Cagliari, but was forced off after 13 minutes due to a thigh injury. In his first game back after returning from injury, Lila scored his first goal for Parma against Sassuolo on 15 March 2015; having played from the start, with the match ending as a 4–1 defeat for the Gialloblù.

==== Return to PAS Giannina ====
After the end of his loan spell, Lila initially refused to return to PAS Giannina in an effort to secure another move to Serie A. In August 2015, he trained with Skënderbeu Korçë to maintain fitness, before rejoining PAS Giannina later that month and reclaiming his squad number 3.

He made his 100th appearance in the Super League Greece on 24 January 2016, playing 70 minutes in a 2–0 away win against Atromitos.

Lila made his European debut with PAS Giannina on 14 July 2016, starting in a 3–0 home win over Odds BK in the first leg of 2016–17 UEFA Europa League first qualifying round. He also featured in the return leg, with PAS Giannina advancing after extra time. The club's European campaign ended in the second qualifying round against AZ Alkmaar, with Lila himself collecting 4 appearances.

On 25 March 2017, Lila was involved in an incident during international duty, after being recorded making inappropriate remarks toward a Greek priest. Following the incident, PAS Giannina reportedly considered terminating his contract. Three days later, he issued a public apology, later meeting the priest in person to apologise and resolve the matter. On 1 April, Lila was an unused substitute in the 1–1 home draw against Xanthi. He returned to the starting lineup four days later, playing 64 minutes in a 3–0 away defeat to Veria. Later that month, Lila scored his first goal of the season, opening the scoring in a 1–1 home draw against AEK Athens on matchday 30. He concluded his sixth season with the club with 22 appearances in all competitions.

On 21 July 2017, Lila signed a new contract with PAS Giannina, keeping him at the club until June 2020. He made 21 league appearances during the 2017–18 Super League Greece season, as the club finished ninth.

In the 2018–19 Super League Greece season, he made 19 appearances, and PAS Giannina relegated after finishing in 14th place.

On 1 July 2019, Lila and PAS Giannina mutually agreed to terminate his contract, bringing an end to his eight-year spell with the club.

=== Return to Tirana ===
On 27 August 2019, Lila returned to Tirana after ten years, signing a contract with the club for the 2019–20 season. He did not make any appearances during the 2019–20 season, as he underwent leg surgery and the campaign was later interrupted by the COVID-19 pandemic.

In 2020, Lila announced his retirement from professional football following a serious injury that required two surgical operations. He later confirmed that the decision marked the definitive end of his playing career, describing it as a difficult choice due to his strong attachment to the sport. During the COVID-19 pandemic, he began writing his autobiography, Triumf, which was published in 2022 and reflects on his playing career and personal experiences in football.

== International career ==
Lila represented Albania at youth levels, including the U17, U19, and U21 teams.

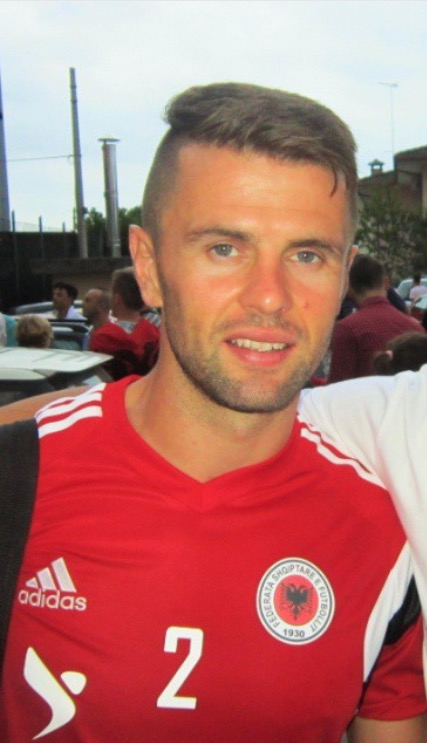
Andi Lila with Albania in 2015.

Lila was first called up to the Albania senior team in late 2007 by head coach Otto Barić while playing as a right back for Besa Kavajë in the Albanian Superliga. He made his senior debut on 21 November 2007 in the closing UEFA Euro 2008 qualifying match against Romania in Bucharest, playing the full 90 minutes in a 6–1 defeat. Following the result, Barić resigned as head coach shortly after the final whistle.

The next manager, Arie Haan, included Lila in his first match in charge, a friendly against Poland on 27 May 2008. Lila started the match and was substituted at half-time as Albania lost 1–0. He went on to make two further appearances under Haan.

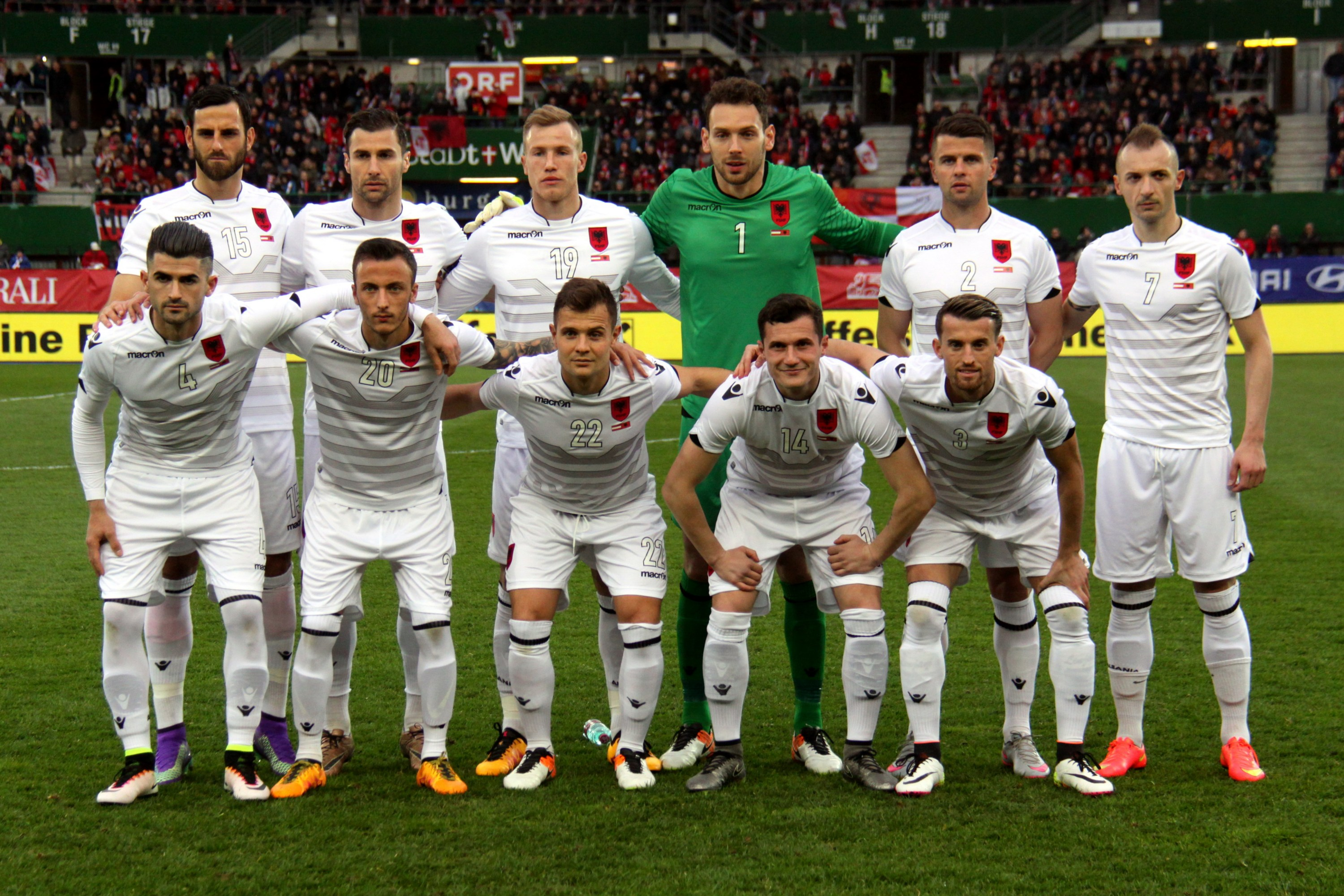
Lila (#2) lining up with Albania in March 2016.

Lila was a regular member of Albania's UEFA Euro 2016 qualifying campaign, appearing as a substitute in the Group I opening 1–0 away win against Portugal on 7 September 2014, their first win over Portugal. On 14 October, he started the third qualifying match against Serbia in Belgrade in what was his 50th international appearance, and was involved in the incident that preceded the match's abandonment, joining Taulant Xhaka in retrieving a banner depicting the map of Greater Albania from Serbian player Stefan Mitrović. The match was abandoned in the 42nd minute following a confrontation involving players and Serbian supporters invading the pitch. UEFA initially awarded Serbia a 3–0 victory and deducted three points, but the Court of Arbitration for Sport later awarded Albania a 3–0 forfeit victory while upholding the deduction. After winning 0–3 at Vazgen Sargsyan Republican Stadium against Armenia on 11 October 2015, Albania's spot at UEFA Euro 2016 was confirmed as team finished second in Group I with 14 points.

On 21 May 2016, Lila was named in Albania's preliminary 27-man squad for Euro 2016, and subsequently in the final 23-man squad announced on 31 May.

Lila was an unused substitute in the opening Group A match against Switzerland, which Albania lost 1–0. He made his first European Championship appearance on 16 June against France, with Albania losing 2–0 after late goals. Lila started the final group match against Romania, which Albania won 1–0, marking the country's first victory at a major international tournament. It was Albania's first win over Romania since 1948. Albania finished third in the group with three points and a goal difference of −2, and was ranked last among the third-placed teams, resulting in elimination from the tournament.

== Personal life ==
Lila is married to Ornela Lila. The couple became parents for the first time on 20 March 2015, when his wife gave birth to their son, Ayan. On 16 July 2015, Lila was awarded the title of "Honorary Citizen of Kavaja" for his contribution to Albanian football and for protecting national symbols. In an interview, Lila stated that his favourite club while growing up was Italian side Internazionale. He is also a fan of the American heavy metal band Metallica and the English rock band The Beatles. Following Albania's historic participation at UEFA Euro 2016, Lila was among the members of the national team who were issued diplomatic passports by the Albanian government in recognition of their achievement.

== Career statistics ==
=== Club ===
Appearances and goals by club, season and competition
Club	Season	League			Cup		Europe		Other		Total	
Club	Season	Division	Apps	Goals	Apps	Goals	Apps	Goals	Apps	Goals	Apps	Goals
Besa Kavajë	2002–03	Albanian Superliga	11	0	—		—		—		11	0
Besa Kavajë	2003–04	Albanian Superliga	10	0	—		—		—		10	0
Besa Kavajë	2004–05	Albanian First Division	24	0	—		—		—		24	0
Besa Kavajë	2005–06	Albanian Superliga	29	1	—		—		—		29	1
Besa Kavajë	2006–07	Albanian Superliga	9	0	—		—		—		9	0
Besa Kavajë	2007–08	Albanian Superliga	29	0	2	1	1 (Note: Appearance(s) in UEFA Cup)	0	1 (Note: Appearance(s) in Albanian Supercup)	0	33	1
Besa Kavajë	2008	UEFA Intertoto Cup	—		—		1 (Note: Appearance(s) in 2008 UEFA Intertoto Cup)	0	—		1	0
Besa Kavajë	Total		112	1	2	1	2	0	1	0	117	2
Iraklis	2006–07	Super League Greece	3	0	—		—		—		3	0
Tirana	2008–09	Albanian Superliga	28	4	6	0	—		—		34	4
Tirana	2009–10	Albanian Superliga	24	1	2	1	2 (Note: Appearance(s) in UEFA Champions League)	0	1	0	29	2
Tirana	2010–11	Albanian Superliga	26	6	6	1	4 (Note: Appearance(s) in UEFA Europa League)	1	—		36	8
Tirana	Total		78	11	14	1	6	1	1	0	99	14
PAS Giannina	2011–12	Super League Greece	21	0	0	0	—		—		21	0
PAS Giannina	2012–13	Super League Greece	25	1	6	1	—		—		31	2
PAS Giannina	2013–14	Super League Greece	26	2	0	0	—		—		26	2
PAS Giannina	2014–15	Super League Greece	14	1	0	0	—		—		14	1
PAS Giannina	2015–16	Super League Greece	19	2	3	0	—		—		22	2
PAS Giannina	2016–17	Super League Greece	18	1	0	0	4	0	—		22	1
PAS Giannina	2017–18	Super League Greece	21	0	2	0	—		—		23	0
PAS Giannina	2018–19	Super League Greece	19	0	1	0	—		—		20	0
PAS Giannina	Total		163	7	14	2	4	0	0	0	181	9
Parma (loan)	2014–15	Serie A	13	2	1	0	—		—		14	2
Tirana	2019–20	Albanian Superliga	—		—		—		—		—	
Career total			369	21	31	4	12	1	2	0	414	26

=== International ===
As of 20 November 2018

Appearances and goals by national team and year
National team	Year	Apps	Goals
Albania	2007	1	0
Albania	2008	3	0
Albania	2009	3	0
Albania	2010	9	0
Albania	2011	9	0
Albania	2012	9	0
Albania	2013	9	0
Albania	2014	9	0
Albania	2015	4	0
Albania	2016	6	0
Albania	2017	5	0
Albania	2018	3	0
Total		70	0

== Honours ==
Tirana

- Albanian Superliga: 2008–09, 2019–20
- Albanian Cup: 2010–11

Decoration

- Honorary citizen of Kavajë: 2015

Sporting positions
Preceded by Devi Muka	KF Tirana captain 2011	Succeeded by Devi Muka
