= Angelos Digozis =

Greek footballer and manager

Personal information
- Date of birth: 19 March 1974 (age 52)
- Place of birth: Pella, Greece
- Height: 1.74 m (5 ft 8 1/2 in)
- Position: Defensive midfielder

Senior career*
Years	Team	Apps	(Gls)
1993–1994	Aris Profiti Ilia	0	(0)
1994–1997	Apollon Kalamarias	81	(6)
1997	Veria	6	(1)
1998–1999	Kavala	33	(4)
1999–2002	OFI	78	(8)
2002–2003	Olympiakos Nicosia	12	(2)
2003–2004	Aris	38	(8)
2004	Ionikos	13	(3)
2005–2007	AEL	68	(14)
2007–2008	Skoda Xanthi	23	(4)
2008–2009	Panserraikos	20	(3)
2009–2010	Anagennisi Karditsa	14	(4)
2010–2011	Niki Volos	13	(0)
2011	Oikonomos Tsaritsani		
Total		399	(57)

Managerial career
- 2012–2013: Panachaiki
- 2013–2014: Tyrnavos 2005
- 2014–2015: Trikala
- 2015: Aiginiakos
- 2015–2017: Kerkyra
- 2017–2018: Doxa Drama
- 2018–2019: Paniliakos
- 2019–2020: Panserraikos
- 2022: Panserraikos
- 2022–2023: O.F. Ierapetra
- 2023: Diagoras
- 2023–2024: Kozani
- 2024–2025: Nea Artaki
- * Club domestic league appearances and goals

Angelos Digozis (Greek: Άγγελος Διγκόζης; born 19 March 1974) is a Greek professional football manager and former player.

Throughout his career, he played a total of 435 matches in all divisions. He was holding a unique record in Greek football, having played in the first division with eight different clubs (Veria, Kavala, OFI, Aris, Ionikos, AEL, Skoda Xanthi and Panserraikos).

== Playing career ==
Born in Pella, Digozis started his professional career with Apollon Kalamarias in 1994, going on to play for two more teams in the following five years, until reaching the top division with OFI.

He helped OFI finish fourth in his first season, with the subsequent UEFA Cup qualification. In 2002, he moved to Cyprus, representing Olympiakos Nicosia for a brief period of time.

In the 2003 January transfer window, Digozis returned to his country with Aris, being an essential midfield element as his club barely avoided top flight relegation in his first full season. He played for four clubs in the following five years, notably helping AEL win the 2006–07 domestic cup, defeating Panathinaikos at the Panthessaliko Stadium, for the second win in the tournament in the team's history.

In 2009, after suffering relegation from the top division with Panserraikos, 35-year-old Digozis resumed his career in the lower leagues.

== Honours ==
AEL

- Greek Cup: 2006–07
