= 2007 Greek Football Cup final =

2007 Greek Cup final
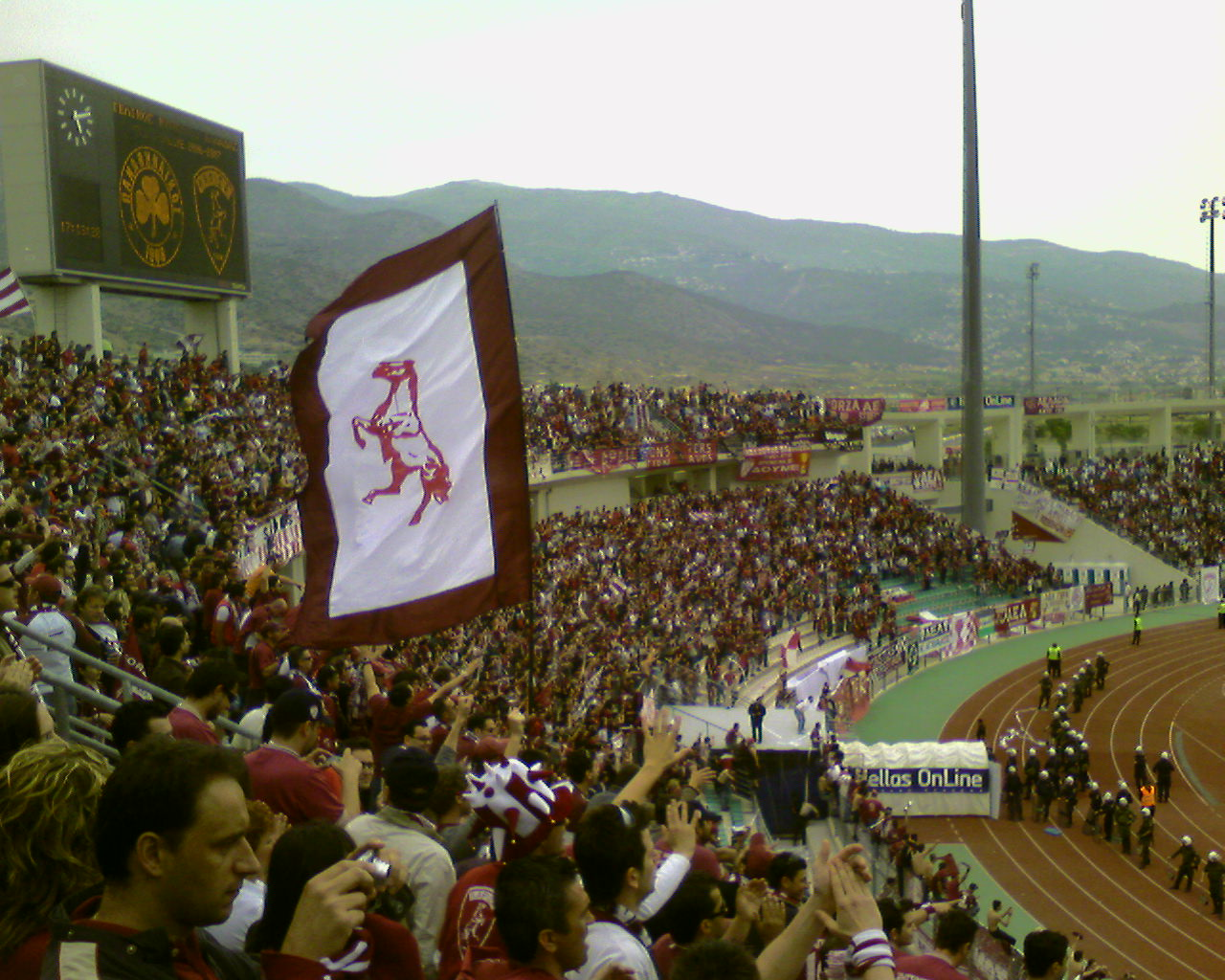
- AEL fans during the match at the Panthessaliko Stadium.
- Event: 2006–07 Greek Football Cup
Panathinaikos	AEL
1	2
- Date: 5 May 2007
- Venue: Panthessaliko Stadium, Volos
- Man of the Match: Nikos Dabizas (AEL)
- Referee: Kyros Vassaras (Thessaloniki)
- Attendance: 18,111
- Weather: Cloudy; 18 °C (64 °F); 77% humidity

The 2007 Greek Cup final was the 63rd final of the Greek Cup. The match took place on 5 May 2007 at Panthessaliko Stadium. The contesting teams were Panathinaikos and AEL. It was Panathinaikos' twenty seventh Greek Cup final in their 99 years of existence and AEL's fourth Greek Cup final in their 43-year history. AEL's defender Stelios Venetidis won the cup with a third different club in his career, after PAOK in 2001 and Olympiacos in 2005 and 2006.

== Venue ==
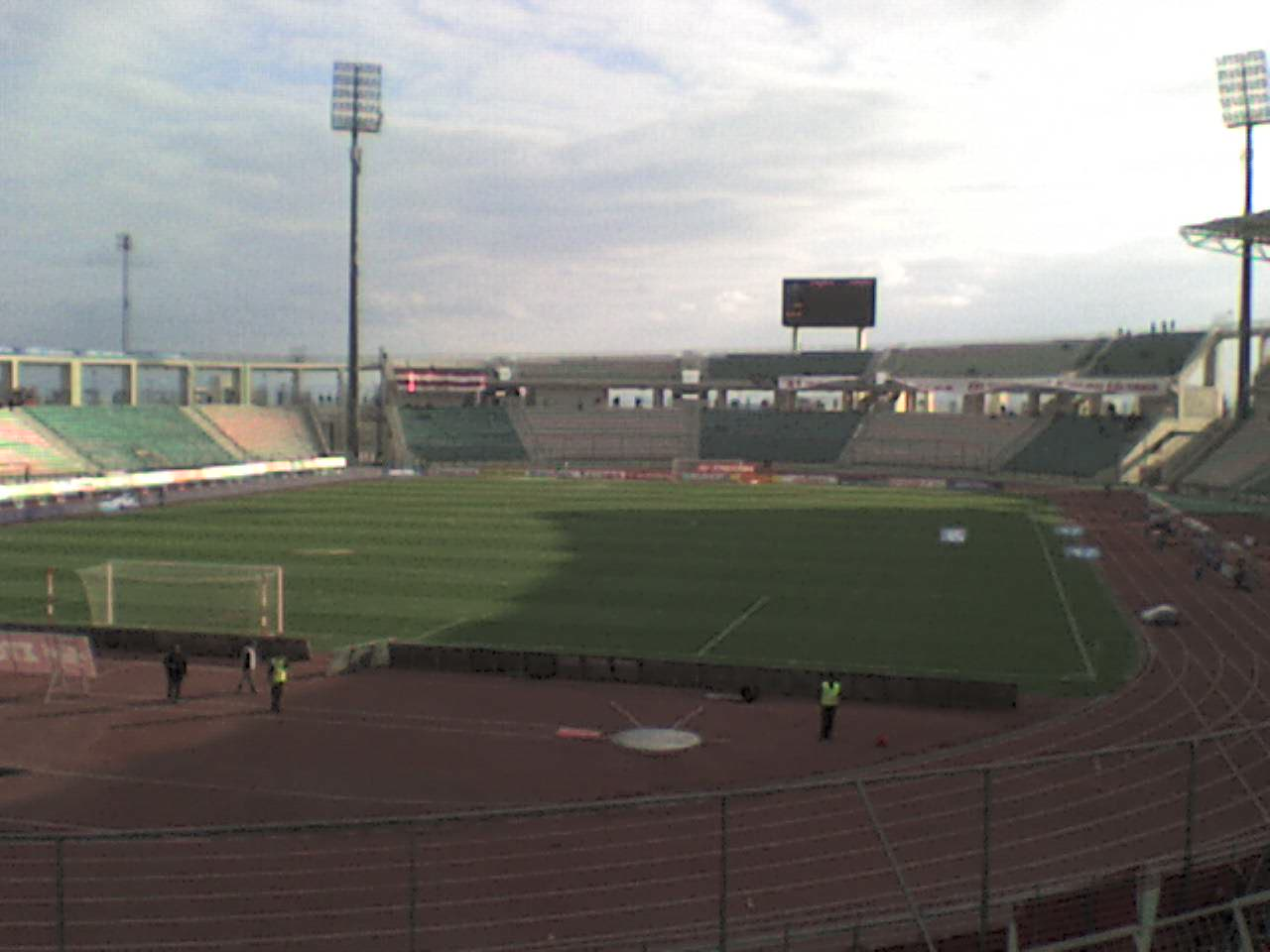
Panthessaliko Stadium.

This was the first Greek Cup final held at Panthessaliko Stadium.

Panthessaliko Stadium was built in 2004. The stadium is used as a venue for Niki Volos. Its current capacity is 22,189.

== Background ==
Panathinaikos had reached the Greek Cup final twenty six times, winning sixteen of them. The last time that they had played in a final was in 2004, where they had won against Olympiacos by 3–1.

AEL had reached the Greek Cup final three times, winning one of them. The last time that had played in a final was in 1985, where they had won against PAOK by 4–1.

The two teams had met each other in a Cup final two times in the 1982 and 1984 finals.

== Route to the final ==
Panathinaikos				Round	AEL			
Opponent	Agg.	1st leg	2nd leg		Opponent	Agg.	1st leg	2nd leg
Thrasyvoulos	1–0 (A)			Round of 32	Panthrakikos	3–1 (A)		
Apollon Kalamarias	1–1 (3–2 p)	0–0 (H)	1–1 (a.e.t.) (A)	Round of 16	OFI	4–2	1–1 (A)	3–1 (H)
PAOK	4–3	2–1 (A)	3–1 (a.e.t.) (H)	Quarter-finals	Kerkyra	2–0	0–0 (A)	2–0 (H)
Skoda Xanthi	1–0	0–0 (A)	1–0 (H)	Semi-finals	PAS Giannina	4–0	2–0 (H)	2–0 (A)

== Match ==
=== Details ===
5 May 2007
18:00 EEST

Panathinaikos	1–2	AEL
Papadopoulos 44' (pen.)	Report	Kožlej 3'; Antchouet 82'

Panthessaliko Stadium, Volos
Attendance: 18,111
Referee: Kyros Vassaras (Thessaloniki)

Panathinaikos	AEL

GK	12	(Cameroon) Pierre Ebéde
RB	29	(Sweden) Mikael Nilsson		(substituted off) 82'
CB	8	(Greece) Giannis Goumas
CB	5	(South Africa) Nasief Morris
LB	24	(Greece) Loukas Vyntra
DM	20	(Greece) Sotiris Leontiou
CM	22	(Greece) Alexandros Tziolis		(substituted off) 86'
RM	37	(Greece) Sotiris Ninis		(substituted off) 73'
LM	27	(Austria) Andreas Ivanschitz	(yellow card) 77'
CF	26	(Greece) Vangelis Mantzios
CF	11	(Greece) Dimitrios Papadopoulos (c)
Substitutes:
GK	1	(Croatia) Mario Galinović
DF	4	(Greece) Ilias Kotsios
DF	15	(Croatia) Srđan Andrić
DF	19	(Croatia) Anthony Šerić		(substituted on) 82'
DF	25	(Croatia) Igor Bišćan		(substituted on) 86'
MF	18	(Greece) Giorgos Theodoridis
FW	9	(Argentina) Sebastián Romero		(substituted on) 73'
Manager:
(Spain) Víctor Muñoz

GK	26	(Greece) Stefanos Kotsolis
RB	7	(Greece) Georgios Galitsios
CB	4	(Greece) Nikos Dabizas (c)
CB	20	(Germany) Marco Förster	(yellow card) 43'
LB	3	(Greece) Stelios Venetidis
DM	66	(Greece) Angelos Digozis	(yellow card) 35'
DM	30	(France) Christian Bassila
RM	18	(Greece) Giorgos Fotakis	(yellow card) 56'
LM	46	(Cyprus) Efstathios Aloneftis		(substituted off) 72'
SS	10	(Brazil) Cleyton		(substituted off) 85'
CF	99	(Slovakia) Jozef Kožlej		(substituted off) 60'
Substitutes:
GK	1	(Greece) Fotis Kipouros
DF	5	(Greece) Spyros Vallas		(substituted on) 85'
DF	23	(Greece) Antonis Poutas
MF	19	(Cyprus) Nektarios Alexandrou
MF	33	(Greece) Panagiotis Bachramis
FW	21	(Greece) Christos Kalantzis		(substituted on) 72'
FW	79	(Gabon) Henri Antchouet	(yellow card) 82'	(substituted on) 60'
Manager:
(Greece) Georgios Donis

Man of the Match:
(Greece) Nikos Dabizas (AEL)

Assistant referees:
Dimitris Saraidaris (Thessaloniki)
Dimitris Bozatzidis (Macedonia)

Match rules

- 90 minutes
- 30 minutes of extra time if necessary
- Penalty shootout if scores still level
- Seven named substitutes
- Maximum of three substitutions

== See also ==
- 2006–07 Greek Football Cup
