= 2004–05 Kategoria e Parë =

Kategoria e Parë
- Season: 2004–05
- Champions: Skënderbeu
- Promoted: Skënderbeu; Besa
- Relegated: Naftëtari; Bylis

The 2004–05 Kategoria e Parë was the 58th season of a second-tier association football league in Albania.

== League table ==
Pos	Team	Pld	W	D	L	GF	GA	GD	Pts	Promotion or relegation
1	Skënderbeu (C, P)	22	15	2	5	36	15	+21	47	Promotion to 2005–06 Kategoria Superiore
2	Besa (P)	22	14	5	3	39	18	+21	47	Promotion to 2005–06 Kategoria Superiore
3	Apolonia	22	12	5	5	38	15	+23	41	
4	Tomori	22	9	8	5	27	19	+8	35	
5	Erzeni	22	9	7	6	22	18	+4	34	
6	Kastrioti	22	8	7	7	25	18	+7	31	
7	Besëlidhja	22	8	6	8	24	23	+1	30	
8	Luftëtari	22	8	6	8	23	25	−2	30	
9	Flamurtari	22	8	3	11	24	29	−5	27	
10	Pogradeci	22	6	6	10	21	21	0	24	
11	Naftëtari (R)	22	4	2	16	12	33	−21	14	Relegation to 2005–06 Kategoria e Dytë
12	Bylis (R)	22	2	1	19	13	70	−57	7	Relegation to 2005–06 Kategoria e Dytë

(C) Champions; (P) Promoted; (R) Relegated

== Championship playoff ==
Besa and Skënderbeu finished the season level on points so the Albanian Football Association decided to organise a championship playoff game to determine the winner of the 2004–05 Kategoria e Parë.

18 May 2005

Besa	0–1	Skënderbeu
		Kadiu 7'

Rudi Bizhuta Stadium, Elbasan
Referee: Sokol Çekaj
