= 2006–07 Kategoria e Parë =

Kategoria e Parë
- Season: 2006–07
- Champions: Skënderbeu
- Promoted: Skënderbeu; Besëlidhja
- Relegated: None

The 2006–07 Kategoria e Parë was the 60th season of a second-tier association football league in Albania.

== League table ==
Pos	Team	Pld	W	D	L	GF	GA	GD	Pts	Promotion
1	Skënderbeu (C, P)	24	17	5	2	46	18	+28	56	Promotion to 2007–08 Kategoria Superiore
2	Besëlidhja (P)	24	16	6	2	46	13	+33	54	Promotion to 2007–08 Kategoria Superiore
3	Turbina	24	14	3	7	26	20	+6	45	
4	Lushnja	24	13	3	8	47	24	+23	42	
5	Laçi	24	10	8	6	34	20	+14	38	
6	Erzeni	24	10	2	12	35	45	−10	32	
7	Pogradeci	24	10	0	14	23	31	−8	30	
8	Tepelena	24	8	5	11	29	30	−1	29	
9	Gramshi	24	9	1	14	27	37	−10	28	
10	Sopoti	24	7	5	12	27	35	−8	26	
11	Bilisht Sport (Note: Bilisht Sport was deducted 3 points.)	24	8	3	13	24	38	−14	24	
12	Ada	24	6	3	15	20	49	−29	21	
13	Tomori (Note: Tomori was excluded after 24th round.)	24	5	2	17	17	41	−24	17	
14	Burreli (Note: Burreli was excluded after 10th round.)	10	5	3	2	8	6	+2	18	

(C) Champions; (P) Promoted
