= Héctor Cuevas =

Argentine footballer

Personal information
- Full name: Héctor Luis Cuevas
- Date of birth: 31 August 1982 (age 44)
- Place of birth: Córdoba, Argentina
- Height: 1.86 m (6 ft 1 in)
- Position: Forward

Senior career*
Years	Team	Apps	(Gls)
2002–2003	Universitario de Córdoba		
2004–2005	Sarmiento de Junín		
2005–2006	9 de Julio		
2007	Racing de Córdoba		
2007–2008	Talleres de Córdoba	37	(13)
2008–2011	Belgrano de Córdoba	77	(9)
2011–2012	PAS Giannina	4	(0)
2012–2018	Sarmiento de Junín	92	(19)
2013–2014	→ Douglas Haig (loan)	41	(9)
2015–2016	→ Atlético San Luis (loan)	1	(0)
2018–2019	Racing de Córdoba	16	(0)
- * Club domestic league appearances and goals

Héctor Luis Cuevas (born 31 August 1982 in Córdoba, Argentina) is an Argentine former professional footballer who played as a forward.
