= Fabrizio Zambrella =

Swiss-Italian footballer (born 1986)

Personal information
- Date of birth: 1 March 1986 (age 40)
- Place of birth: Geneva, Switzerland
- Height: 1.82 m (6 ft 0 in)
- Position: Midfielder

Team information
- Current team: Meyrin

Youth career
- Servette

Senior career*
Years	Team	Apps	(Gls)
2002–2004	Servette	34	(9)
2004–2009	Brescia	111	(4)
2009–2012	Sion	52	(3)
2012	→ PAS Giannina (loan)	10	(0)
2013–2014	Lausanne-Sport	15	(0)
2015–2017	Le Mont	55	(5)
2017–2019	Stade Nyonnais	46	(5)
2019–	Meyrin	0	(0)

International career
	Switzerland U19	23	(4)
	Switzerland U21	26	(5)
- * Club domestic league appearances and goals as of 9 September 2017

Fabrizio Zambrella (born 1 March 1986) is a Swiss-former Italian professional footballer who played for FC Meyrin.

== Career ==
Zambrella played for Brescia, leaving the club at the end of his contract on 30 June 2009. On 20 October 2009, FC Sion signed the Swiss midfielder on a free transfer until June 2013. He joined PAS Giannina on a three-month loan in January 2012. Following his return to Sion, the player was seen as surplus to requirements and did not feature at all for the first-team during the 2012–13 season. After one year out of competitive football, Zambrella made a return by joining FC Lausanne-Sport on 1 July 2013, signing a two-year contract.

== International career ==
Zambrella was a squad member of Switzerland's teams in the 2004 UEFA European Under-19 Championship and the 2005 FIFA World Youth Championship.

== Honours ==
Sion

- Swiss Cup: 2010–11
