= Fotis Kipouros =

Greek footballer

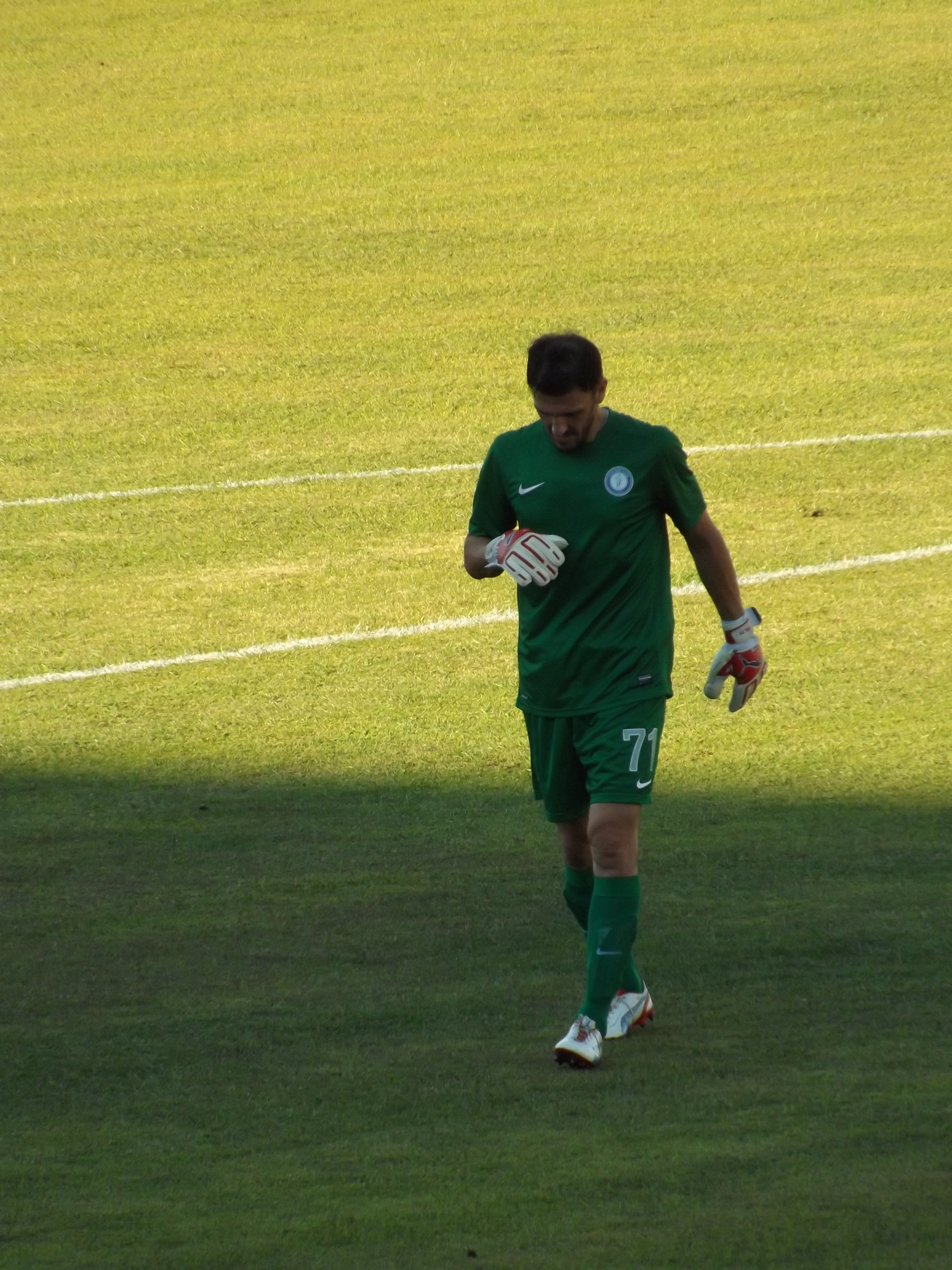
- Kipouros playing for Iraklis.

Personal information
- Full name: Fotios Kipouros
- Date of birth: 9 August 1975 (age 51)
- Place of birth: Thessaloniki, Greece
- Height: 1.86 m (6 ft 1 in)
- Position: Goalkeeper

Senior career*
Years	Team	Apps	(Gls)
1997–2003	Kavala	75	(0)
2003–2004	Chalkida	37	(0)
2004–2008	AEL	16	(0)
2008	Panserraikos	17	(0)
2009	Atromitos	2	(0)
2009–2010	Olympiacos Volos	18	(0)
2010–2012	PAS Giannina	48	(0)
2012–2013	Platanias	27	(0)
2013–2014	Iraklis	8	(0)
2014–2015	Kampaniakos	0	(0)
- * Club domestic league appearances and goals as of 23 August 2014

Fotis Kipouros (Greek: Φώτης Κηπουρός; born 9 August 1975) is a Greek former professional footballer who played as a goalkeeper.

== Career ==
Born in Thessaloniki, Kipouros began his playing career by signing with Kavala in July 1997. In 2010, he signed an annual contract for Greek Football League outfit PAS Giannina. In his first season with the club, he appeared in 26 matches, helping the club to gain promotion to the Super League. He stayed with PAS Giannina for one more season and appeared in no less than 22 occasions for the club. In the summer of 2013 he signed for newly promoted Super League club Platanias. He became the club's starting goalkeeper, appearing in all but three matches summing a total of 27 appearances. On 16 July 2013 he signed an annual contract with Iraklis. In the summer of 2014, after his contract with Iraklis expired, he signed for Football League 2 club Kampaniakos.

== Honours ==
AEL

- Greek Cup: 2006–07
