= Elini Dimoutsos =

Greek footballer

Personal information
- Full name: Charalampos Elini Dimoutsos
- Date of birth: 18 June 1988 (age 38)
- Place of birth: Lushnje, Albania
- Height: 1.77 m (5 ft 10 in)
- Position: Midfielder

Senior career*
Years	Team	Apps	(Gls)
2004–2007	Ilisiakos	15	(0)
2007–2011	Panathinaikos	22	(0)
2008–2009	→ OFI (loan)	19	(0)
2010	→ Panetolikos (loan)	16	(1)
2011	→ FK Mladá Boleslav (loan)	12	(1)
2011–2015	Atromitos	131	(4)
2015–2017	Asteras Tripolis	39	(3)
2017–2018	Platanias	14	(0)
2018–2020	Lamia	53	(1)
2020–2021	Xanthi	22	(1)
2022	Anagennisi Karditsas	16	(1)
2022–2023	Egaleo	12	(0)

International career^{‡}
2007–2008	Greece U19	7	(0)
2008–2010	Greece U21	24	(3)
2012	Greece	1	(0)
- * Club domestic league appearances and goals as of 16 June 2023 ‡ National team caps and goals as of 18 August 2013

Elini Dimoutsos (Greek: Ελίνι Δημούτσος; Albanian: Elin Dhimuco; born 18 June 1988) is a former Greek professional footballer who played as a midfielder.

== Club career ==
=== Early life and career ===
After growing up in his native Albania, his family moved to Greece when he was seven. He started playing football in the youth team of Ilisiakos. In the 2006–07 season he was on loan to Fostiras (National D Division); scouts from Panathinaikos were impressed by him and he moved to Panathinaikos FC, signing for four years in July 2007.
He is a midfielder and was selected for the Greece National Under 19 Football Team, with which he played a vital role in the EURO U19 Championships, where Greece finished second to Spain.

=== Panathinaikos ===
Dimoutsos won the admiration of Panathinaikos fans through his dribbling skills, stamina, and determination. Initially signed primarily as a reserve player, he earned a place in the first team through his performances. A versatile midfielder, he is capable of playing in defensive, central, and right midfield positions.

In the summer transfer period of 2008, Dimoutsos signed with Crete club OFI on loan.

In January 2010, Dimoutsos signed with Panetolikos on loan. In the summer of 2010, he returned to Panathinaikos and, after participating in the team's pre-season training, he gained a spot at the team's roster. While managing to participate against Barcelona in November 2010 in the group stage of the Champions League, he did not gain any more appearances with the main team and was loaned to FK Mladá Boleslav for the rest of the 2011 season.

=== Atromitos ===
In the summer transfer period of 2011, Dimoutsos wasn't in Jesualdo Fereira plans for the new season and he transferred in Atromitos signing 2 years contract. He made his debut on 30 September with the team in an away 1–0 victory against Aris. A year later during the 2012–13 season, he scored with the team in a tremendous 3–2 away victory against Olympiacos in Karaiskakis stadium. On 15 July 2015, after four years with the club and 151 appearances in all competitions, Atromitos announces the end of the cooperation with the player. Therefore, along with Luigi Cennamo, has informed that are not included in the planning of the club for the next season.

=== Asteras Tripolis ===
Reports from Tripoli suggest that the midfielder, who ended his contract with Atromitos, will probably sign with Asteras Tripolis for the next season. Eventually on 19 June 2015, Dimoutsos signed a three years' contract with Asteras Tripolis for an undisclosed fee, scoring his first goal for the club against Panionios, on 23 September 2015.

=== Platanias ===
On 4 September 2017, he signed a year contract with Platanias for an undisclosed fee.

=== Lamia ===
On 4 June 2018, he signed a contract with Lamia for an undisclosed fee.

=== Xanthi ===
On 6 October 2020, he signed a contract with Xanthi F.C. for an undisclosed fee.

== International career ==
Dimoutsos made his debut for Greece in an away friendly win against Norway. This is his sole appearance for Greece to date.
