= Jaouad Zairi =

Moroccan footballer (born 1982)

Personal information
- Date of birth: 17 April 1982 (age 44)
- Place of birth: Taza, Morocco
- Height: 1.81 m (5 ft 11 in)
- Position: Winger

Youth career
- 1997–2000: Gueugnon

Senior career*
Years	Team	Apps	(Gls)
2000–2001	Gueugnon	28	(4)
2001–2006	Sochaux	87	(5)
2006	→ Al-Ittihad (loan)	24	(8)
2006–2007	Boavista	6	(0)
2007	→ Nantes (loan)	8	(0)
2007–2009	Asteras Tripolis	42	(0)
2009–2011	Olympiacos	32	(2)
2011–2012	PAS Giannina	8	(1)
2012	Anorthosis Famagusta	8	(1)
2013–2014	Salalah	5	(0)
2014	Monts d'Or Azergues Foot	3	(0)
2015	Football Club Vaulx-en-Velin	9	(2)
2015–2017	Zakynthos	24	(7)
Total		284	(30)

International career
2000–2009	Morocco	34	(6)
- * Club domestic league appearances and goals

Jaouad Zairi (Arabic: جواد الزايري; born 17 April 1982) is a Moroccan professional footballer who played as a winger. He played for the Morocco national team between 2000 and 2009, making 34 appearances and scoring six goals.

== Early life ==
Zairi was born into a large family in Taza, Morocco. At the age of 2, his family moved to Mâcon, a small French city. In 1997, he moved to FC Gueugnon.

== Club career ==
Zairi joined the French Ligue 2 team FC Gueugnon at the age of 15. In the summer of 2001, he joined FC Sochaux and played for them until 2008. In January 2006 he was loaned to the Saudi club Al-Ittihad. He moved to Portugal and played for one year with Boavista F.C. (2006–2007). He returned in France and played another year with FC Nantes (2007–2008).

He moved to Greece and played for Super League Greece side Asteras Tripolis for the 2008–09 season.

On 25 April 2009, Olympiacos announced Zairi would join for the 2009–10 season. He won the 2010–11 Super League Greece with the club. After two seasons with Olympiacos he was informed by Olympiacos' manager Ernesto Valverde that he was not to renew his contract with the club and that he was free to leave.

In July 2017, he made an appearance for Indonesian club Persija Jakarta in a friendly match against Espanyol.

== International career ==
Zairi made a debut for Morocco national team in 2000. He played in the Africa Cup of Nations in 2004 when Morocco made it to the finals but lost to their North African rivals Tunisia.

Zairi also played for Morocco at the 2000 Summer Olympics.

=== International goals ===
Scores and results list Morocco's goal tally first, score column indicates score after each Zairi goal.

List of international goals scored by Jaouad Zairi
No.	Date	Venue	Opponent	Score	Result	Competition
1	20 June 2003	Prince Moulay Abdellah Stadium, Rabat, Morocco	Gabon	2–0	2–0	2004 Africa Cup of Nations qualification
2	8 February 2004	Stade Taïeb Mhiri, Sfax, Tunisia	Algeria	3–1	3–1 (a.e.t)	2004 Africa Cup of Nations
3	31 March 2004	Prince Moulay Abdellah Stadium, Rabat, Morocco	Angola	3–0	3–1	Friendly
4	9 February 2005	Prince Moulay Abdellah Stadium, Rabat, Morocco	Kenya	1–0	5–1	2006 FIFA World Cup qualification
5	9 February 2005	Prince Moulay Abdellah Stadium, Rabat, Morocco	Kenya	2–0	5–1	2006 FIFA World Cup qualification
6	9 February 2005	Prince Moulay Abdellah Stadium, Rabat, Morocco	Kenya	5–0	5–1	2006 FIFA World Cup qualification

== Honours ==
Olympiacos

- Super League Greece: 2010–11

Morocco

- Africa Cup of Nations runner-up: 2004
