= Fotis Georgiou =

Greek footballer

Personal information
- Full name: Fotios Georgiou
- Date of birth: 19 July 1985 (age 41)
- Place of birth: Arta, Greece
- Height: 1.68 m (5 ft 6 in)
- Position: Winger

Youth career
- Panathinaikos

Senior career*
| Years | Team | Apps | (Gls) |
| 2002–2006 | Marko | 78 | (9) |
| 2006–2009 | Kallithea | 53 | (2) |
| 2009 | → Lamia (loan) | 11 | (1) |
| 2009–2010 | Ionikos | 24 | (4) |
| 2010–2011 | Diagoras | 31 | (8) |
| 2011–2013 | PAS Giannina | 58 | (5) |
| 2013–2015 | Atromitos | 26 | (0) |
| 2015–2016 | AEL Kalloni | 27 | (2) |
| 2016–2018 | Kerkyra | 32 | (0) |
| 2018 | Iraklis | 5 | (0) |
| 2019 | Diagoras | 74 | (13) |
| 2020-21 | PAS Acheron Kanallaki | 2 | (0) |
| 2022-23 | Ialysos | | |
| 2023-24 | Iraklis Maritsa | | |
- * Club domestic league appearances and goals as of 24 August 2025

Fotis Georgiou (Greek: Φώτης Γεωργίου; born 19 July 1985) is a retired Greek professional footballer.

== Career ==
Born in Arta, Georgiou began playing football for Marko F.C. in the Gamma Ethniki.
