= Hegon =

Brazilian footballer (born 1988)

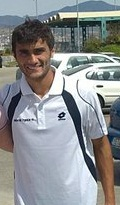
- Hegon in 2011

Personal information
- Full name: Hegon Henrique Martins de Andrade
- Date of birth: May 6, 1988 (age 38)
- Place of birth: Palhoça, Brazil
- Height: 1.77 m (5 ft 9 1/2 in)
- Position: Attacking midfielder

Team information
- Current team: Guarani SC

Youth career
- 2002–2003: Atlético Paranaense
- 2004: Figueirense
- 2004–2008: Avaí

Senior career*
Years	Team	Apps	(Gls)
2008–2011	Avaí	2	(0)
2009	→ Metropolitano (loan)		
2009–2010	→ Guarani (loan)		
2010–2011	→ União São João (loan)		
2011–2013	Asteras Tripolis	19	(1)
2013–2014	Apollon Smyrnis	10	(0)
2014–2015	S.E.R. Guarani	19	(4)
2015–2016	Criciúma		
2015	→ Cimarrones de Sonora (loan)	10	(1)
2016	Camboriú	11	(1)
2017–2018	Jagodina	24	(3)
2019–	Guarani SC		
- * Club domestic league appearances and goals as of 11 June 2018

Hegon Henrique Martins de Andrade, known as Hegon (born May 6, 1988), is a Brazilian footballer, who plays as an attacking midfielder for Guarani SC.

== Career ==
It was in the youth team at Avaí that Hegon first came to prominence winning a Catarinense Junior Championship title in 2005. He turned professional in 2008.

Not many chances in the squad's team of Florianopolis in the year when the club returned to the elite of Brazilian football, even by the young, was lent to the Metropolitan Hegon to compete in the state in 2009. That same year, the Avaí sees an opportunity to not leave the house stopped the silver and yet again to borrow from the Guarani Palhoça (his hometown).

In 2010, Hegon back to compose the cast of Avaí but not for long. In July the player is announced as the newest building of the Union St. John Still in the same year he returned to work in the Avaí Cup Sub23.

From 2011 to 2013, he played for Asteras Tripolis in the Super League Greece and from 2013 to 2014 he played for Apollon Smyrnis.

=== Career statistics ===
(Correct as of October 16, 2010)

Club	Season	State League		Brazilian Série A		Copa do Brasil		Copa Sudamericana		Total	
Club	Season	Apps	Goals	Apps	Goals	Apps	Goals	Apps	Goals	Apps	Goals
Avaí	2010	-	-	1	0	-	-	-	-	?	?
Total		-	-	1	0	-	-	-	-	?	?

== Honours ==
Avaí

- Campeonato Catarinense: 2010

Asteras Tripolis

- Greek Cup: runner-up 2013
