= Giannis Zaradoukas =

Greek footballer

Personal information
- Full name: Ioannis Zaradoukas
- Date of birth: 12 December 1985 (age 40)
- Place of birth: Athens, Greece
- Height: 1.72 m (5 ft 8 in)
- Position: Left-back

Youth career
- –2007: Panathinaikos

Senior career*
Years	Team	Apps	(Gls)
2007–2009	Panathinaikos	0	(0)
2007–2008	→ Panserraikos (loan)	21	(0)
2008–2009	→ Ethnikos Piraeus (loan)	26	(1)
2009–2011	Olympiacos Volos	48	(1)
2011–2013	Olympiacos	1	(0)
2011–2012	→ PAS Giannina (loan)	5	(1)
2013	→ Aris (loan)	12	(0)
2013–2014	Asteras Tripolis	7	(0)
2014–2015	Platanias	27	(0)
2015–2016	Skoda Xanthi	4	(0)
2016–2017	Kerkyra	16	(0)
2017–2018	Levadiakos	21	(0)
2018–2019	Marko	16	(2)
2019–2021	Koropi	19	(5)

International career^{‡}
2011	Greece	4	(0)
- * Club domestic league appearances and goals as of 8 July 2018 ‡ National team caps and goals as of 7 October 2011

Giannis Zaradoukas (Greek: Γιάννης Ζαραδούκας; born 12 December 1985) is a Greek former professional footballer who played as a left-back.

== Club career ==
On loan from Panathinaikos in 2007–08, Zaradoukas helped Panserraikos earn promotion from Beta Ethniki to the Greek Super League.

Following his successful season with Panserraikos, Panathinaikos loaned Zaradoukas to Ethnikos Piraeus – another strong Beta Ethniki club trying to earn promotion to the Super League – for the 2008–09 season.

In September 2011, Zaradoukas was released on free transfer, due to the relegation of Olympiacos Volos for involvement in match-fixing scandals and signed a 2-year contract with Olympiacos On 29 December 2011 he signed a six-month loan deal with PAS Giannena, as he didn't feature in the plans of his coach. He scored his first goal for PAS Giannina against Kerkyra on 4 February 2012. On 18 January 2013, he signed a six-month loan with Aris. He made his debut 2 days later in a home draw against AEK Athens.

In June 2013, Zaradoukas was released from Olympiacos, and he signed a two-years contract with Asteras Tripolis. He made his debut with the club on 18 August 2013 in a home draw against PAS Giannina. At the beginning of 2014, Zaradoukas signed a six-month contract with Platanias and made his debut with the club on 3 March 2014 in a 1–2 home loss against PAS Giannina. On 10 July 2015, Zaradoukas was released from Platanias.

In July 2015, Zaradoukas signed a contract with Skoda Xanthi for an undisclosed fee and on 27 July 2016, he signed a year contract with Kerkyra. On 11 July 2017, he signed a season contract with Levadiakos

== International career ==
On 10 August 2011, he debuted for the Greece national team, after a call-up by national coach Fernando Santos in a friendly match against Bosnia and Herzegovina. His first competitive match for the national team was during a successful 1–0 win against Israel for the EURO 2012 qualification round.

== Honours ==
- Panserraikos
  - Beta Ethniki: 2007–08
- Olympiacos:
  - Super League Greece: 2012–13
  - Greek Cup: 2013
