= Nikos Psychogios =

Greek footballer (born 1989)

Personal information
- Full name: Nikolaos Psychogios
- Date of birth: 25 February 1989 (age 37)
- Place of birth: Ierissos, Chalkidiki, Greece
- Height: 1.73 m (5 ft 8 in)
- Positions: Defender; full back

Senior career*
Years	Team	Apps	(Gls)
2008–2011	Iraklis	0	(0)
2009–2011	→ Olympiacos Volos (loan)	37	(2)
2011–2012	Doxa Drama	16	(0)
2012–2015	Aris	32	(0)
2015	Apollon Kalamarias	1	(0)
2015-2017	Akanthos Ierissos F.C.		

International career
2009–	Greece U21	5	(0)
- * Club domestic league appearances and goals as of 20 August 2024

Nikos Psychogios (Greek: Νίκος Ψυχογιός, born 25 February 1989) is a former Greek football player. His latest professional football club was Aris in the Football League 2.

== Club career ==
He started his career at Iraklis, without making a single league appearance for the club. In 2009, he signed for Beta Ethniki side Olympiacos Volos on a two-year loan. His team won the 2009–10 Beta Ethniki championship and won promotion to the 2010–11 Super League, with him making 24 appearances and scoring 2 goals. He signed for current club Aris Thessaloniki on 23 August 2012

== Controversy ==
There was some controversy surrounding the loan move of Nikos to Olympiacos Volos. Olympiacos initially announced that they acquired the player on a full transfer, with Nikos signing a two-year contract. The situation was cleared up on 9 February 2011, when the Hellenic Football Federation confirmed that the player was on loan to the club, and he would have to move back to Iraklis after the season was over.
