= Leandro Becerra =

Argentine footballer

Personal information
- Full name: Leandro Rodrigo Becerra
- Date of birth: 26 January 1984 (age 42)
- Place of birth: Cordoba, Argentina
- Height: 1.75 m (5 ft 9 in)
- Position: Attacking midfielder

Team information
- Current team: Deportivo Madryn

Senior career*
Years	Team	Apps	(Gls)
2005–2006	Mérida FC		
2006	DC United		
2006–2007	Atlético Rafaela	11	(2)
2007–2008	Tiro Federal	7	(1)
2008–2009	Belgrano	25	(3)
2009–2010	San Martín (SJ)	33	(4)
2010–2011	Atlético Tucumán	30	(3)
2011–2012	PAS Giannina	26	(7)
2012–2014	Baku	4	(0)
2014	Anorthosis Famagusta	18	(1)
2014–2015	Defensa y Justicia	1	(0)
2015	Patronato	34	(3)
2016–2017	Central Córdoba SdE	34	(11)
2017–2018	Gimnasia Mendoza	33	(4)
2019–	Deportivo Madryn	10	(0)
- * Club domestic league appearances and goals as of 20:23, 19 November 2019 (UTC)

Leandro Becerra (born 26 January 1984, in Cordoba) is an Argentine footballer who play for Deportivo Madryn.

== Career ==
In May 2015, Becerra was awarded $230,000 from FK Baku by FIFA over unfulfilled contract obligations.

== Career statistics ==
As of 15 October 2015

Club performance			League		Cup		Continental		Total	
Season	Club	League	Apps	Goals	Apps	Goals	Apps	Goals	Apps	Goals
2008–09	Belgrano	Primera B Nacional	31	3	-		-		31	3
2009-10	San Martín	Primera B Nacional	33	4	-		-		33	4
2010-11	Atlético Tucumán	Primera B Nacional	30	3	-		-		30	3
2011–12	PAS Giannina	Super League Greece	26	7	0	0	-		26	7
2012–13	FK Baku	Azerbaijan Premier League	4	0	0	0	0	0	4	0
2013–14	Anorthosis Famagusta	Cypriot First Division	18	1	1	0	0	0	19	1
2014	Defensa y Justicia	Argentine Primera División	1	0	0	0	0	0	1	0
2015	Patronato	Primera B Nacional	28	2	1	0	0	0	29	2
Total	Argentina		123	12	1	0	0	0	124	12
Total	Greece		26	7	0	0	0	0	26	7
Total	Azerbaijan		4	0	0	0	0	0	4	0
Total	Cyprus		18	1	1	0	0	0	19	1
Career total			171	20	2	0	0	0	173	20
