= 2007–08 Olympiacos F.C. season =

Olympiacos
2007–08 season
- Chairman: Sokratis Kokkalis
- Manager: Takis Lemonis (until 11 March 2008); José Segura
- Stadium: Karaiskakis Stadium, Piraeus
- Super League Greece: Winners
- Greek Cup: Winners
- Greek Super Cup: Winners
- Champions League: Round of 16
- Top goalscorer: League: Darko Kovačević (17); All: Darko Kovačević (24)
- Highest home attendance: 33,500 vs Real Madrid (6 November 2007)
- Lowest home attendance: 14,544 vs Ergotelis (16 February 2008)
- Average home league attendance: 26,720
Home colours	Away colours	Third colours

The 2007–08 season was Olympiacos's 49th consecutive season in the Super League Greece and their 82nd year in existence. The club were played their 11th consecutive season in the UEFA Champions League. Manager Takis Lemonis left the club by mutual consent on 11 March 2008 due to the club's lower-than-expected performance of the team in the Superleague, and was replaced by his assistant, José Segura.

== Players ==
=== First-team squad ===
Squad at end of season

Note: Flags indicate national team as defined under FIFA eligibility rules; some limited exceptions apply. Players may hold more than one non-FIFA nationality.

No.	Pos.	Nation	Player
1	GK	GRE	Leonidas Panagopoulos
2	DF	GRE	Christos Patsatzoglou
3	DF	FRA	Didier Domi
4	DF	BRA	Leonardo
5	DF	BRA	Júlio César
6	MF	GRE	Ieroklis Stoltidis (vice-captain)
7	MF	ARG	Luciano Galletti
9	FW	SRB	Darko Kovačević
10	FW	ARG	Leonel Núñez
11	MF	SRB	Predrag Đorđević (captain)
14	DF	POL	Michał Żewłakow
15	DF	ESP	Raúl Bravo
18	DF	GRE	Paraskevas Antzas
19	MF	GRE	Konstantinos Mendrinos
21	MF	GRE	Andreas Vasilogiannis

No.	Pos.	Nation	Player
22	FW	GRE	Kostantinos Mitroglou
23	FW	CYP	Michalis Konstantinou
24	MF	GRE	Georgios Katsikogiannis
25	MF	ARG	Fernando Belluschi
27	DF	GRE	Konstantinos Lambropoulos
28	MF	ARG	Cristian Ledesma
30	DF	GRE	Anastasios Pantos
31	MF	GRE	Aristides Soiledis
32	FW	COD	Lomana LuaLua
35	DF	GRE	Vasilis Torosidis
71	GK	GRE	Antonis Nikopolidis (vice-captain)
74	GK	CRO	Tomislav Butina
77	MF	SVN	Mirnes Šišić
87	GK	GRE	Michalis Sifakis
92	DF	GRE	Kyriakos Papadopoulos

=== Winter squad changes ===
In Note: Flags indicate national team as defined under FIFA eligibility rules; some limited exceptions apply. Players may hold more than one non-FIFA nationality.

No.	Pos.	Nation	Player
77	MF	SVN	Mirnes Šišić from Levadiakos
25	MF	ARG	Fernando Belluschi from River Plate
4	DF	BRA	Leonardo from Portuguesa

Total spending: ▼€10,400,000

Out Note: Flags indicate national team as defined under FIFA eligibility rules; some limited exceptions apply. Players may hold more than one non-FIFA nationality.

No.	Pos.	Nation	Player
8	MF	ARG	Rodrigo Archubi to River Plate
16	MF	CIV	Marco Né Released by Club
18	FW	ECU	Félix Borja to Mainz 05
36	MF	GRE	Giannoulis Fakinos Released by Club

Total income: ▲€1,450,000

==== Out on loan ====
Note: Flags indicate national team as defined under FIFA eligibility rules; some limited exceptions apply. Players may hold more than one non-FIFA nationality.

No.	Pos.	Nation	Player
4	DF	MKD	Vanče Šikov to Apollon Kalamarias
7	DF	GRE	Georgios Galitsios to AEL
13	MF	HUN	Zsolt Laczkó to Leicester City
20	FW	GRE	Lefteris Matsoukas to Egaleo
77	MF	BRA	Leozinho to OFI
88	MF	ALB	Jahmir Hyka to KF Tirana

=== Current national players ===
Note: Flags indicate national team as defined under FIFA eligibility rules; some limited exceptions apply. Players may hold more than one non-FIFA nationality.

No.	Pos.	Nation	Player
2	DF	GRE	Christos Patsatzoglou 26 (1)
14	DF	POL	Michał Żewłakow 74 (2)
18	DF	GRE	Paraskevas Antzas 21 (0)
23	FW	CYP	Michalis Konstantinou 45 (20)
25	MF	ARG	Fernando Belluschi 2 (0)
28	MF	ARG	Cristian 3 (0)
32	FW	COD	Lomana LuaLua 30 (13)
35	DF	GRE	Vasilis Torosidis 10 (0)
71	GK	GRE	Antonis Nikopolidis 84 (0)

- Appearances (Goals)

== Club ==
=== Management ===
Position	Staff
Manager	(Spain) José Segura
Assistant manager	(Montenegro) Božidar Bandović
Club doctor	(Greece) Giannis Anagnostopoulos
Chief scout	(Greece) Antreas Niniadis

Last updated: 12 Mar 2008
Source: Olympiacos FC

=== Other information ===
Chairman	(Greece) Socratis Kokkalis
Vice-Chairman/Managing Director	(Greece) Petros Kokkalis
Technical manager	(Serbia) Ilija Ivić
Ground (capacity and dimensions)	Karaiskakis Stadium (33,334 / 120x80 m)

Source: Olympiacos FC article about Socratis Kokkalis and Olympiacos FC article about Karaiskákis Stadium

== Competitions ==
=== Overall ===
Competition	Started round	Current position / round	Final position / round	First match	Last match
Greek Super Cup	—	—	Winner	31 October 2007	
Super League Greece	—	—	Winner	2 September 2007	20 April 2008
UEFA Champions League	Group Stage	—	Round of 16	18 September 2007	5 March 2008
Greek Cup	4th Round	—	Winner	5 December 2007	17 May 2008

Updated to match played 18 May 2008
Source: Competitions

=== Super League Greece ===
==== League table ====
Pos	Team	Pld	W	D	L	GF	GA	GD	Pts	Qualification or relegation
1	Olympiacos (Note: The match of Apollon Kalamarias against Olympiacos, originally ended 1–0 to the home side, but later was awarded to Olympiacos 0–3 by the Greek sports court giving Olympiacos the three points, on the basis that the home side fielded an ineligible player (Roman Wallner). Apollon were deducted by one point.) (C)	30	21	7	2	58	23	+35	70	Qualification for the Champions League third qualifying round
2	AEK Athens	30	22	2	6	65	17	+48	68	Qualification for the Play-offs
3	Panathinaikos	30	20	6	4	44	18	+26	66	Qualification for the Play-offs
4	Aris	30	14	8	8	32	20	+12	50	Qualification for the Play-offs
5	Panionios	30	13	6	11	39	42	−3	45 (Note: Head-to-head record: Panionios–AEL 3–1, AEL–Panionios 1–0.)	Qualification for the Play-offs

Source: Super League Greece
Rules for classification: 1st points; 2nd head-to-head points; 3rd head-to-head goal difference; 4th decision match.
According to the official Super League playoff regulation, the position after the playoffs replaces the regular season position.
(C) Champions

==== Results summary ====
Overall								Home						Away					
Pld	W	D	L	GF	GA	GD	Pts	W	D	L	GF	GA	GD	W	D	L	GF	GA	GD
30	21	7	2	58	23	+35	70	13	2	0	32	9	+23	8	5	2	26	14	+12

Last updated: April 21, 2008.
Source: Super League Greece

==== Results by round ====
Round	1	2	3	4	5	6	7	8	9	10	11	12	13	14	15	16	17	18	19	20	21	22	23	24	25	26	27	28	29	30
Ground	A	H	A	H	H	A	H	A	H	A	H	H	A	H	A	H	A	H	A	A	H	A	H	A	H	A	A	H	A	H
Result	D	W	D	W	W	D	W	L	W	W	W	W	D	W	W	D	W	W	W	W	W	D	D	W	W	W	L	W	W	W
Position	7	3	7	3	2	3	3	4	3	3	2	2	2	2	1	2	2	2	1	1	1	2	2	2	1	1	1	1	1	1

Source: Olympiacos FC
A = Away; H = Home; W = Win; D = Draw; L = Loss

==== Matches ====
All times for domestic competitions at Eastern European Time

2 September 2007 1	Panathinaikos	0–0	Olympiacos	Athens
21:15		Report		Stadium: Leoforos Alexandras Stadium; Attendance: 13,430; Referee: Georgios Kasnaferis

23 September 2007 2	Olympiacos	6–2	OFI	Piraeus
19:00	Júlio César 7'; LuaLua 20', 39'; Kovačević 25', 43'; Đorđević 74'	Report	Sfakianakis 13'; Torosidis 88' (o.g.)	Stadium: Karaiskakis Stadium; Attendance: 25,054; Referee: Theofilos Fotiadis

29 September 2007 3	Aris	1–1	Olympiacos	Thessaloniki
16:45	Marco Aurélio 90+3'	Report	Galletti 39'	Stadium: Kleanthis Vikelidis Stadium; Attendance: 10,459; Referee: Georgios Kasnaferis

6 October 2007 4	Olympiacos	1–0	Apollon Kalamarias	Piraeus
19:00	Kovačević 44'	Report		Stadium: Karaiskakis Stadium; Attendance: 27,029; Referee: Stavros Tritsonis

20 October 2007 5	Olympiacos	4–1	Panionios	Piraeus
19:00	LuaLua 6'; Kovačević 64'; Stoltidis 74'; Galletti 81' (pen.)	Report	Djebbour 54' (pen.)	Stadium: Karaiskakis Stadium; Attendance: 20,104; Referee: Michalis Germanakos

28 October 2007 6	Ergotelis	3–3	Olympiacos	Heraklion
16:45	Júnior 21' (pen.), 88'; Theodoridis 23'	Report	Júlio César 38'; Kovačević 43'; Đorđević 59' (pen.)	Stadium: Pankritio Stadium; Attendance: 8,807; Referee: Kyros Vassaras

3 November 2007 7	Olympiacos	2–1	PAOK	Piraeus
19:00	Torosidis 52'; Kovačević 67'	Report	Konstantinidis 42'	Stadium: Karaiskakis Stadium; Attendance: 28,077; Referee: Konstantinos Papastamatis

10 November 2007 8	Asteras Tripolis	1–0	Olympiacos	Tripoli
19:00	Filomeno 34'	Report		Stadium: Asteras Tripolis Stadium; Attendance: 4,005; Referee: Anastasios Kakos

24 November 2007 9	Olympiacos	1–0	Veria	Piraeus
19:00	Kovačević 36'	Report		Stadium: Karaiskakis Stadium; Attendance: 18,070; Referee: Georgios Kasnaferis

2 December 2007 10	Atromitos	1–3	Olympiacos	Athens
19:00	Korakakis 90+3'	Report	Stoltidis 11'; LuaLua 30'; Kovačević 71'	Stadium: Peristeri Stadium; Attendance: 5,969; Referee: Romanos Kontogiannidis

8 December 2007 11	Olympiacos	4–0	Levadiakos	Piraeus
19:00	Stoltidis 23'; Kovačević 35'; Đorđević 52' (pen.); Mitroglou 63'	Report		Stadium: Karaiskakis Stadium; Attendance: 17,096; Referee: Georgios Daloukas

16 December 2007 12	Olympiacos	1–0	AEK Athens	Piraeus
19:00	Kovačević 83'	Report		Stadium: Karaiskakis Stadium; Attendance: 30,229; Referee: Anastasios Kakos

23 December 2007 13	AEL	0–0	Olympiacos	Larissa
19:00		Report		Stadium: Alcazar Stadium; Attendance: 6,910; Referee: Kyros Vassaras

29 December 2007 14	Olympiacos	2–1	Skoda Xanthi	Piraeus
19:00	LuaLua 20'; Kovačević 59'	Report	Radzinski 26'	Stadium: Karaiskakis Stadium; Attendance: 23,164; Referee: Iraklis Tsikinis

5 January 2008 15	Iraklis	1–2	Olympiacos	Thessaloniki
16:45	Katsabis 59'	Report	Kovačević 70', 72'	Stadium: Kaftanzoglio Stadium; Attendance: 4,394; Referee: Iraklis Tsikinis

13 January 2008 16	Olympiacos	1–1	Panathinaikos	Piraeus
19:00	Antzas 45+1'	Report	N'Doye 14'	Stadium: Karaiskakis Stadium; Attendance: 31,310; Referee: Dimitrios Kalopoulos

20 January 2008 17	OFI	0–1	Olympiacos	Heraklion
16:45		Report	Núñez 16'	Stadium: Pankritio Stadium; Attendance: 8,497; Referee: Ioannis Stavridis

27 January 2008 18	Olympiacos	1–0	Aris	Piraeus
19:00	Đorđević 80' (pen.)	Report		Stadium: Karaiskakis Stadium; Attendance: 30,014; Referee: Ilias Mazarakos

3 February 2008 19	Apollon Kalamarias	0–3 ^{1}	Olympiacos	Thessaloniki
16:45	Barkoglou 90+1'	Report		Stadium: Kaftanzoglio Stadium; Attendance: 4,453; Referee: Georgios Daloukas

10 February 2008 20	Panionios	0–4	Olympiacos	Athens
19:00		Report	Kovačević 5', 53'; Đorđević 27' (pen.); Núñez 81'	Stadium: Nea Smyrni Stadium; Attendance: 3,376; Referee: Vasileios Paboridis

16 February 2008 21	Olympiacos	1–0	Ergotelis	Piraeus
19:00	Đorđević 28'	Report		Stadium: Karaiskakis Stadium; Attendance: 14,544; Referee: Georgios Stathopoulos

23 February 2008 22	PAOK	1–1	Olympiacos	Thessaloniki
19:00	González 2'	Report	Kovačević 22'	Stadium: Toumba Stadium; Attendance: 22,000; Referee: Vasileios Paboridis

1 March 2008 23	Olympiacos	1–1	Asteras Tripolis	Piraeus
19:00	Júlio César 2'	Report	Cardozo 33'	Stadium: Karaiskakis Stadium; Attendance: 24,503; Referee: Evangelos Katsidonis

9 March 2008 24	Veria	0–1	Olympiacos	Veria
16:45		Report	Patsatzoglou 7'	Stadium: Veria Stadium; Attendance: 3,001; Referee: Christoforos Zografos

15 March 2008 25	Olympiacos	2–0	Atromitos	Piraeus
19:00	Šišić 49'; Júlio César 85'	Report		Stadium: Karaiskakis Stadium; Attendance: 20,343; Referee: Marios Labropoulos

23 March 2008 26	Levadiakos	1–3	Olympiacos	Livadeia
16:45	Dimbala 7'	Report	Galletti 19'; Belluschi 32'; Kovačević 35'	Stadium: Levadia Municipal Stadium; Attendance: 4,007; Referee: Lazaros Polatian

30 March 2008 27	AEK Athens	4–0	Olympiacos	Athens
19:00	Blanco 10'; Edinho 12'; Lyberopoulos 32'; Kafes 60'	Report		Stadium: Olympic Stadium; Attendance: 40,955; Referee: Christoforos Zografos

6 April 2008 28	Olympiacos	2–1	AEL	Piraeus
19:00	Šišić 50'; Mitroglou 90'	Report	Metin 41'	Stadium: Karaiskakis Stadium; Attendance: 24,318; Referee: Ioannis Stavridis

13 April 2008 29	Skoda Xanthi	1–4	Olympiacos	Xanthi
19:00	Labriakos 53'	Report	Żewłakow 31'; Đorđević 38', 49', 52'	Stadium: Skoda Xanthi Arena; Attendance: 4,957; Referee: Georgios Kasnaferis

20 April 2008 30	Olympiacos	3–1	Iraklis	Piraeus
19:00	Mitroglou 26', 39'; Đorđević 50'	Report	Malagueño 61'	Stadium: Karaiskakis Stadium; Attendance: 29,084; Referee: Vasileios Paboridis

1. The match was played on 3 February 2008 and Apollon Kalamarias won 1–0, but due to the illegal appearance of Roman Wallner (Apollon), the result was invalid. It was decided that Olympiacos would be awarded a 3–0 win while Apollon would be punished with one point deducted.

=== Greek Cup ===
In the fourth round (round of "32") of the Greek Cup, Olympiacos faced Diagoras from Rhodes, who played in the Third Division. The latter were close to shock the champions who made it to the fifth round with a goal scored in the last minutes of the match. The next opponents were rivals Panathinaikos, who were crushed 4–0 by Olympiacos in an at-capacity Karaiskakis Stadium. In the quarter-finals, Olympiacos eliminated Iraklis 2–0 in the first leg and earning a 2–2 draw in the second. For the semi-finals, Olympiacos faced Thrasyvoulos, winning 2–3 away and 3–1 at home. Olympiacos then faced Aris in the final at Kaftanzoglio Stadium, Thessaloniki, where they won the Greek Cup after a 2–0 win.

==== Fourth round ====
5 December 2007	Diagoras	1–2	Olympiacos	Rhodes
17:45	Triantafyllou 59' (pen.)	Report	Mitroglou 66', 89'	Stadium: Diagoras Stadium; Attendance: 3,700; Referee: Michalis Germanakos

==== Fifth round ====
16 January 2008	Olympiacos	4–0	Panathinaikos	Piraeus
21:30	LuaLua 6'; Torosidis 63'; Kovačević 65'; Núñez 79'	Report		Stadium: Karaiskakis Stadium; Attendance: 31,255; Referee: Anastasios Kakos

==== Quarter-finals ====
27 February 2008 First leg	Olympiacos	2–0	Iraklis	Piraeus
20:00	Mendrinos 5', 9'	Report		Stadium: Karaiskakis Stadium; Attendance: 22,547; Referee: Georgios Kasnaferis

19 March 2008 Second leg	Iraklis	2–2 (3–4 agg.)	Olympiacos	Thessaloniki
20:00	Aarón 42'; Ribeiro 88'	Report	Bantis 10' (o.g.); Mitroglou 23'	Stadium: Kaftanzoglio Stadium; Attendance: 2,397; Referee: Ioannis Stavridis

==== Semi-finals ====
2 April 2008 First leg	Thrasyvoulos	2–3	Olympiacos	Fyli
16:45	Anastasakos 29'; Bris 35'	Report	Mendrinos 16'; Núñez 28'; Kovačević 89'	Stadium: Fyli Stadium; Attendance: 3,524; Referee: Dimitrios Kyrkos

16 April 2008 Second leg	Olympiacos	3–1 (6–3 agg.)	Thrasyvoulos	Piraeus
21:00	Kovačević 14'; Konstantinou 15'; Núñez 21'	Report	Manikas 33'	Stadium: Karaiskakis Stadium; Attendance: 15,347; Referee: Stavros Tritsonis

==== Final ====
17 May 2008 Final	Olympiacos	2–0	Aris	Thessaloniki
19:00	Kovačević 33'; Żewłakow 53'	Report		Stadium: Kaftanzoglio Stadium; Attendance: 20,270; Referee: Georgios Kasnaferis

=== Greek Super Cup ===
Olympiacos added one more trophy to their long list. The 2006–07 Super League Greece champions beat the 2006–07 Greek Cup holders, AEL, 1-0 at the Karaiskakis stadium on October 31, and won the Super Cup for the third time in their history. Kostas Mitroglou scored the winner on 39 minutes after a cross by Soiledis (coach Takis Lemonis decided to give more playing time to the younger players on the team) while Galletti missed out on an opportunity when his shot hit the bar on 81 minutes. The final attracted only 7,141 fans at Olympiacos' home, from which 7,030 were the supporters of the hosts.

31 October 2007 Final	Olympiacos	1–0	AEL	Piraeus
20:00 EET (UTC+2)	Mitroglou 39'	Report		Stadium: Karaiskakis Stadium; Attendance: 7,141; Referee: Kostas Kapitanis (Cyprus)

=== UEFA Champions League ===
All times at CET

==== Group stage ====
Olympiacos, in their 11th consecutive presence in the competition, were drawn into Group C with Real Madrid, Werder Bremen and Lazio. The Reds started their campaign with a 1–1 draw behind closed doors at the Karaiskákis Stadium against Lazio, but on the second day, Olympiacos made their first ever away win in the Champions League and stopped their run of 31 matches without a success on their travels with a 3–1 win over Werder Bremen at Weserstadion, turning the game around from 0–1. After, they travelled to Santiago Bernabéu Stadium as leaders of Group C, where they were defeated 2–4 to Real Madrid after a heart-breaking match in which the Greek team was playing with ten men from the 13th minute and was leading the score to the 68th with 2–1, turning it around from 0–1. Real Madrid scored their third goal in the 83rd, but Olympiacos came close to score many times during the last minutes of the match and leave Madrid with the draw, when Real secured the win with a last-minute goal.

In the return legs of the group stage, Olympiacos produced a determined display to earn a point against Real Madrid, in the goalless draw at the Karaiskakis Stadium, keeping alive the record of being undefeated by Real in Athens in four matches. The Reds moved a step closer to qualifying for the last 16 after coming from behind to defeat Lazio 2–1 in Rome's Stadio Olimpico, while on the last day, Olympiacos smashed Werder Bremen 3–0 in Athens, which ensured their place in the knockout stage of the tournament.

18 September 2007 1	Olympiacos (Greece)	1–1	(Italy) Lazio	Piraeus, Greece
20:45	Galletti 55'	(Report)	Zauri 77'	Stadium: Karaiskakis Stadium; Attendance: 0 Referee: Eric Braamhaar (Netherlands)

3 October 2007 2	Werder Bremen (Germany)	1–3	(Greece) Olympiacos	Bremen, Germany
20:45	Almeida 32'	(Report)	Stoltidis 72'; Patsatzoglou 82'; Kovačević 87'	Stadium: Weserstadion; Attendance: 37,500; Referee: Claus Bo Larsen (Denmark)

24 October 2007 3	Real Madrid (Spain)	4–2	(Greece) Olympiacos	Madrid, Spain
20:45	Raúl 2'; Robinho 68', 83'; Balboa 90'	(Report)	Galletti 8'; Júlio César 47'	Stadium: Santiago Bernabéu Stadium; Attendance: 64,477; Referee: Tom Henning Øvrebø (Norway)

6 November 2007 4	Olympiacos (Greece)	0–0	(Spain) Real Madrid	Piraeus, Greece
20:45		(Report)		Stadium: Karaiskakis Stadium; Attendance: 33,500; Referee: Ľuboš Micheľ (Slovakia)

28 November 2007 5	Lazio (Italy)	1–2	(Greece) Olympiacos	Rome, Italy
20:45	Pandev 30'	(Report)	Galletti 35'; Kovačević 64'	Stadium: Stadio Olimpico; Attendance: 39,996; Referee: Howard Webb (England)

11 December 2007 6	Olympiacos (Greece)	3–0	(Germany) Werder Bremen	Piraeus, Greece
20:45	Stoltidis 12', 74'; Kovačević 70'	(Report)		Stadium: Karaiskakis Stadium; Attendance: 30,297; Referee: Laurent Duhamel (France)

===== Standings =====
Pos	Team	Pld	W	D	L	GF	GA	GD	Pts	Qualification
1	(Spain) Real Madrid	6	3	2	1	13	9	+4	11	Advance to knockout stage
2	(Greece) Olympiacos	6	3	2	1	11	7	+4	11	Advance to knockout stage
3	(Germany) Werder Bremen	6	2	0	4	8	13	−5	6	Transfer to UEFA Cup
4	(Italy) Lazio	6	1	2	3	8	11	−3	5	

Source: RSSSF

==== Knockout stage ====
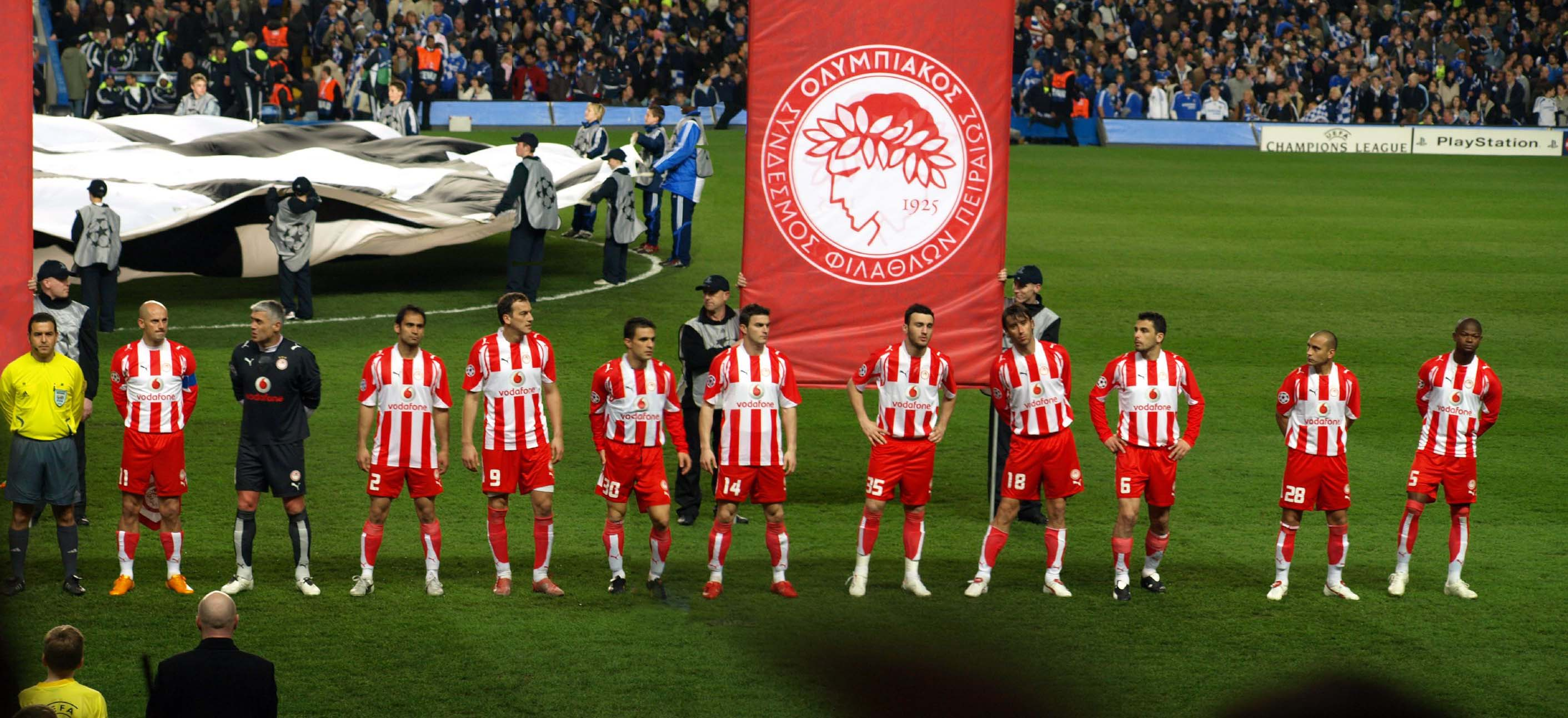
Chelsea vs Olympiacos

===== Round of 16 =====
The draw for the first knockout round took place on 21 December, and paired Olympiacos with Chelsea. The two clubs had never met in the past. In the first leg in Athens, Olympiacos held Chelsea to 0–0, a score which left both teams content, Olympiacos because they did not concede a goal in their home and Chelsea because they kept a clean sheet to occupy the driving seat going into the return leg in London. Olympiacos, backed by deafening and frenzied support, refused to be overawed by their English opponents, enjoying the lion's share of possession and chances in a closely contested encounter. The Londoners failed to create one real clear-cut chance against their opponents and their manager Avram Grant said, "The performance could have been better. It's not a bad result. We didn't create a lot of chances, it's disappointing. But its hard to play here. They have good supporters and a well organized team."

In the second leg in London, Chelsea won 3–0. The Blues surprised the Reds and scored very early with their first chance. Olympiacos balanced the game, but the English scored again before the end of the first-half. At the start of the second-half, Chelsea scored for the final time after another error from the Olympiacos defence.

19 February 2008 First leg	Olympiacos (Greece)	0–0	(England) Chelsea	Piraeus, Greece
20:45		(Report)		Stadium: Karaiskakis Stadium; Attendance: 31,302; Referee: Konrad Plautz (Austria)

5 March 2008 Second leg	Chelsea (England)	3–0 (3–0 agg.)	(Greece) Olympiacos	London, England
20:45	Ballack 5'; Lampard 25'; Kalou 48'	(Report)		Stadium: Stamford Bridge; Attendance: 37,721; Referee: Manuel Mejuto González (Spain)

== Team kit ==
Supplier: Puma
Sponsor(s): Vodafone

Home	Away	Third	Fourth

Source: Olympiacos FC

== Individual Awards ==
Name	Pos.	Award
(Serbia) Darko Kovačević	Forward	Super League Greece Best Foreign Player
(Greece) Antonios Nikopolidis	Goalkeeper	Super League Greece Goalkeeper of the Season
