= 2009–10 Olympiacos F.C. season =

Olympiacos
2009–10 season
- Chairman: Sokratis Kokkalis
- Manager: Temur Ketsbaia (until 25 November 2009); Zico (until 1 March 2010); Božidar Bandović
- Stadium: Karaiskakis Stadium, Piraeus
- Super League Greece: 2nd in regular season (5th in play-offs)
- Greek Cup: Fourth round
- Champions League: Round of 16
- Top goalscorer: League: Kostas Mitroglou (9); All: Kostas Mitroglou (14)
- Highest home attendance: 31,059 vs Panathinaikos (29 November 2009)
- Lowest home attendance: 16,056 vs Kavala (12 September 2009)
- Average home league attendance: 19,666
Home colours	Away colours	Third colours

The 2009–10 season was Olympiacos's 51st consecutive season in the Super League Greece and their 84th year in existence. Olympiacos finished 2nd in the regular season of the Greek Super League and ranked last at the play-off games, resulting in a 5th place at the League, the worst position of team's recent seasons. Olympiacos also participated in UEFA Champions League 2009–10, and managed to qualify to the knock-stage (round of 16). They lost twice from French side Bordeaux, 3–1 on aggregate.

This season was the last season with Sokratis Kokkalis as chairman of the club. The 5th league position as well as the team's low level of spectacle created a disappointing atmosphere, resulting in Kokkalis's decision to leave the club after two decades of constant presence.

== Events ==
- 27 May 2009: Former Georgian international player Temur Ketsbaia is appointed coach, replacing Ernesto Valverde from Spain.
- 19 June 2009: Antonios Nikopolidis, Dudu, and Luciano Galletti are appointed captains for the 2009–10 season.
- 23 June 2009: Swedish international Olof Mellberg is signed from Serie A sides Juventus. Matt Derbyshire is also signed from Premier League team Blackburn Rovers after previously being on loan with Olympiacos.
- 15 September 2009: Manager Temuri Ketsbaia is sacked despite not conceding a single goal in his time at the club he was replaced with Božidar Bandović who hasn't impressed at Olympiacos.

== Players ==
=== First-team squad ===
Squad at end of season

Note: Flags indicate national team as defined under FIFA eligibility rules; some limited exceptions apply. Players may hold more than one non-FIFA nationality.

No.	Pos.	Nation	Player
1	GK	GRE	Antonis Nikopolidis
2	DF	GRE	Kyriakos Papadopoulos
3	DF	FRA	Didier Domi
4	DF	SWE	Olof Mellberg
5	DF	GRE	Georgios Galitsios
6	MF	GRE	Ieroklis Stoltidis
7	MF	ARG	Luciano Galletti
8	MF	ESP	Óscar González
9	FW	ENG	Matt Derbyshire
10	FW	BRA	Diogo
11	MF	MAR	Jaouad Zairi
14	DF	POL	Michał Żewłakow
15	DF	ESP	Raúl Bravo
17	MF	GRE	Andreas Vasilogiannis
18	MF	GRE	Ioannis Fetfatzidis
20	MF	BRA	Dudu (Vice-captain)

No.	Pos.	Nation	Player
21	DF	GRE	Avraam Papadopoulos
22	FW	GRE	Kostas Mitroglou
23	FW	GRE	Giorgos Niklitsiotis
24	DF	BRA	Leonardo
25	MF	ITA	Enzo Maresca
28	MF	ARG	Cristian Raúl Ledesma
30	DF	GRE	Anastasios Pantos
31	MF	GRE	Aristidis Soiledis
32	FW	COD	Lomana LuaLua
33	MF	GRE	Giannis Papadopoulos
35	DF	GRE	Vasilis Torosidis
50	GK	SVK	Pavel Kováč
71	GK	GRE	Antonios Nikopolidis (Captain)
78	GK	ESP	Urko Pardo
88	MF	GRE	Georgios Katsikogiannis

==== Out on loan ====
Note: Flags indicate national team as defined under FIFA eligibility rules; some limited exceptions apply. Players may hold more than one non-FIFA nationality.

No.	Pos.	Nation	Player

==== Players from the youth system ====
Note: Flags indicate national team as defined under FIFA eligibility rules; some limited exceptions apply. Players may hold more than one non-FIFA nationality.

No.	Pos.	Nation	Player
1	GK	GRE	Leonidas Panagopoulos
2	DF	GRE	Kyriakos Papadopoulos
17	MF	GRE	Andreas Vasilogiannis
23	FW	GRE	Giorgos Niklitsiotis
31	MF	GRE	Aristides Soiledis
88	MF	GRE	Georgios Katsikogiannis
—	MF	GRE	Ioannis Fetfatzidis

=== Foreign players ===
EU Nationals

- (France) Didier Domi
- (Italy) Enzo Maresca
- (Sweden) Olof Mellberg
- (England) Matt Derbyshire
- (Spain) Óscar
- (Spain) Raúl Bravo
- (Spain) Urko Rafael Pardo
- (Poland) Michał Żewłakow
- (Slovakia) Pavel Kováč
- (Morocco) (France) Jaouad Zairi
- (Argentina) (Italy) Luciano Galletti

Non-EU Nationals

- (Brazil) Dudu
- (Brazil) Diogo
- (Brazil) Leonardo
- (Argentina) Cristian Raúl Ledesma

==== Technical & Medical Staff ====
Position	Name
Head coach	(Montenegro) Božidar Bandović
Assistant coach	(Greece) Andreas Niniadis
Goalkeeping coach	(Greece) Alekos Rantos
Physical fitness coach	(Brazil) Moraci Sant'Anna
Fitness trainer	(Spain) José Antonio Pozanko
Team attendant	(Greece) Petros Rigoutsos
Chief scout	(Greece) Andreas Niniadis

Position	Name
Head of medical department	(Greece) Dr. Padelis Nikolaou
Head doctor	(Greece) Dr. Ioannis Anagnostopoulos
Doctor (cardiologist)	(Greece) Dr. Panos Stamatopoulous
First team physiotherapist	(Brazil) Rodrigo Savini
First team physiologist	(Greece) Georgios Ziogas

=== Reserves team ===
As on: 21 August 2009, Source: Olympiacos F.C. U21 Team Note: Flags indicate national team as defined under FIFA eligibility rules; some limited exceptions apply. Players may hold more than one non-FIFA nationality.

No.	Pos.	Nation	Player
1	GK	GRE	Nikolaos Papadopoulos
2	DF	GRE	Yannis Apostolopoulos
3	MF	GRE	Giorgos Valerianos
4	DF	GRE	Georgios Petropoulos
5	DF	GRE	Kostas Rougalas
6	MF	GRE	Panagiotis Stamogiannos
7	MF	GRE	Andreas Vasilogiannis
8	MF	GRE	Kostas Kotsaridis
9	FW	ALB	Vasil Shkurtaj
10	FW	GRE	Giorgos Niklitsiotis
11	MF	GRE	Giannis Fetfatzidis

No.	Pos.	Nation	Player
12	DF	GRE	Kostas Kritikos
13	DF	GRE	Yiannis Potouridis
14	MF	GRE	Fillipos Kurtanović
15	GK	SRB	Ivan Babović
16	DF	GRE	Evangelos Kabasis
17	MF	FRA	Guillaume Bernard Panuel
18	MF	GRE	Spyros Karatzanidis
19	MF	GRE	Thomas Makaronas
20	FW	GRE	Dimitrios Diamantakos
21	FW	GRE	Konstantinos Lavdas
22	DF	GRE	Stavros Soulis

=== Transfers ===
==== Summer transfers ====
In: Note: Flags indicate national team as defined under FIFA eligibility rules; some limited exceptions apply. Players may hold more than one non-FIFA nationality.

No.	Pos.	Nation	Player
4	DF	SWE	Olof Mellberg (from Juventus, €2.5M)
9	FW	ENG	Matt Derbyshire (from Blackburn Rovers, €3.35M)
11	MF	MAR	Jaouad Zairi (from Asteras Tripolis, free)
15	DF	ESP	Raúl Bravo (loan return)
28	MF	ARG	Cristian Raúl Ledesma (loan return)
25	MF	ITA	Enzo Maresca (from Sevilla, €1M)
78	GK	ESP	Urko Rafael Pardo (on loan from Rapid București)
88	MF	GRE	Georgios Katsikogiannis (loan return)

- Total spending: ▼€6.85 million

Out: Note: Flags indicate national team as defined under FIFA eligibility rules; some limited exceptions apply. Players may hold more than one non-FIFA nationality.

No.	Pos.	Nation	Player
—	MF	ARG	Fernando Belluschi (to Porto, €5M)
—	MF	GRE	Christos Patsatzoglou (to Omonia, free)
—	MF	GRE	Konstantinos Mendrinos (to PAS Giannina, free)
—	MF	GRE	Paraskevas Antzas (retired)
—	MF	SRB	Predrag Đorđević (retired)
—	FW	SRB	Darko Kovačević (retired)
—	DF	GRE	Konstantinos Lambropoulos (to Asteras Tripolis, free)

Total income: ▲€5 million

== Competitions ==
=== Super League Greece ===
==== League table ====
Pos	Team	Pld	W	D	L	GF	GA	GD	Pts	Qualification or relegation
1	Panathinaikos (C)	30	22	4	4	54	17	+37	70	Qualification for the Champions League group stage
2	Olympiacos	30	19	7	4	47	18	+29	64	Qualification for the Play-offs
3	PAOK	30	19	5	6	41	16	+25	62	Qualification for the Play-offs
4	AEK Athens	30	15	8	7	43	31	+12	53	Qualification for the Play-offs
5	Aris	30	12	10	8	35	28	+7	46	Qualification for the Play-offs

Source: Super League Greece
Rules for classification: 1) Points; 2) Head-to-head points; 3) Head-to-head goal difference; 4) Play-offs (neutral ground).
(Note: Criterion 4 is only used if needed to decide champion, teams for relegation or teams for UEFA competitions).
(C) Champions

==== Results summary ====
Overall								Home						Away					
Pld	W	D	L	GF	GA	GD	Pts	W	D	L	GF	GA	GD	W	D	L	GF	GA	GD
30	19	7	4	47	18	+29	64	9	4	2	26	10	+16	10	3	2	21	8	+13

Last updated: December 13, 2009.
Source: Super League Greece

==== Results by round ====
Round	1	2	3	4	5	6	7	8	9	10	11	12	13	14	15	16	17	18	19	20	21	22	23	24	25	26	27	28	29	30
Ground	A	A	H	A	H	A	H	H	A	H	A	H	A	H	A	H	H	A	H	A	H	A	A	H	A	H	A	H	A	H
Result	W	W	D	W	W	W	W	W	W	D	D	W	W	W	L	L	W	D	L	W	W	W	D	W	L	D	W	D	W	W
Position	2	2	2	2	2	2	2	2	2	2	2	1	1	1	2	2	2	2	2	2	2	2	2	2	3	3	2	2	2	2

Source: Super League Greece
A = Away; H = Home; W = Win; D = Draw; L = Loss

==== Matches ====
All times at EET

30 August 2009 2	AEL	0–2	Olympiacos	Larissa
21:15		Report	Leonardo 22'; Maresca 32'	Stadium: Alcazar Stadium; Attendance: 5,018; Referee: Anastasios Kakos

12 September 2009 3	Olympiacos	0–0	Kavala	Piraeus
19:00		Report		Stadium: Karaiskakis Stadium; Attendance: 16,056; Referee: Marios Labropoulos

20 September 2009 4	PAOK	1–2	Olympiacos	Thessaloniki
21:15	Vieirinha 10'	Report	Diogo 40'; A. Papadopoulos 90'	Stadium: Toumba Stadium; Attendance: 23,010; Referee: Anastasios Kakos

23 September 2009 1	AEK Athens	1–2	Olympiacos	Athens
21:15	Németh 65'	Report	Torosidis 43', 55'	Stadium: Olympic Stadium; Attendance: 34,553; Referee: Georgios Daloukas

26 September 2009 5	Olympiacos	1–0	Panionios	Piraeus
16:45	Zairi 18'	Report		Stadium: Karaiskakis Stadium; Attendance: 22,163; Referee: Vassilios Paboridis

3 October 2009 6	Levadiakos	0–3	Olympiacos	Livadeia
19:00		Report	Oscar 5'; Dudu 29' (pen.); Diogo 40'	Stadium: Levadia Municipal Stadium; Attendance: 3,222; Referee: Dimitrios Kalopoulos

17 October 2009 7	Olympiacos	3–0	Asteras Tripolis	Piraeus
19:00	Mellberg 35'; Mitroglou 53'; Zairi 67'	Report		Stadium: Karaiskakis Stadium; Attendance: 20,398; Referee: Apostolos Abarkiolis

24 October 2009 8	Olympiacos	2–1	Ergotelis	Piraeus
19:00	Mitroglou 38'; Dudu 85'	Report	Shashiashvili 22'	Stadium: Karaiskakis Stadium; Attendance: 21,254; Referee: Stavros Tritsonis

31 October 2009 9	Atromitos	0–1	Olympiacos	Athens
19:00		Report	Oscar 80'	Stadium: Peristeri Stadium; Attendance: 5,551; Referee: Vassilios Paboridis

7 November 2009 10	Olympiacos	1–1	Iraklis	Piraeus
19:00	Maresca 40'	Report	Vellios 90+2'	Stadium: Karaiskakis Stadium; Attendance: 20,415; Referee: Georgios Stathopoulos

21 November 2009 11	PAS Giannina	2–2	Olympiacos	Ioannina
19:00	Tzanis 83'; Bakayoko 90'	Report	Żewłakow 23'; Mitroglou 80'	Stadium: Zosimades Stadium; Attendance: 7,500; Referee: Georgios Daloukas

29 November 2009 12	Olympiacos	2–0	Panathinaikos	Piraeus
19:30	Mitroglou 45+1', 54'	Report		Stadium: Karaiskakis Stadium; Attendance: 31,059; Referee: Anastasios Kakos

5 December 2009 13	Skoda Xanthi	0–1	Olympiacos	Xanthi
19:00		Report	Leonardo 31'	Stadium: Skoda Xanthi Arena; Attendance: 2,793; Referee: Michael Koukoulakis

13 December 2009 14	Olympiacos	3–0	Panthrakikos	Piraeus
16:45	Galletti 37'; Dudu 45', 58'	Report		Stadium: Karaiskakis Stadium; Attendance: 18,041; Referee: Anastasios Sidiropoulos

20 December 2009 15	Aris	1–0	Olympiacos	Thessaloniki
19:00	Campora 69'	Report		Stadium: Kleanthis Vikelidis Stadium; Attendance: 14,616; Referee: Vassilios Paboridis

6 January 2010 16	Olympiacos	1–2	AEK Athens	Piraeus
19:00	A. Papadopoulos 26'	Report	Scocco 33', 40'	Stadium: Karaiskakis Stadium; Attendance: 27,789; Referee: Dimitrios Kalopoulos

10 January 2010 17	Olympiacos	2–1	AEL	Piraeus
14:30	Maresca 37'; Galletti 40'	Report	Nikopolidis 81' (o.g.)	Stadium: Karaiskakis Stadium; Attendance: 19,327; Referee: Nathaniel Charalambidis

17 January 2010 18	Kavala	0–0	Olympiacos	Kavala
19:00		Report		Stadium: Anthi Karagianni Stadium; Attendance: 7,047; Referee: Anastasios Kakos

24 January 2010 19	Olympiacos	0–1	PAOK	Piraeus
19:00		Report	Edinho 20'	Stadium: Karaiskakis Stadium; Attendance: 26,137; Referee: Georgios Daloukas

31 January 2010 20	Panionios	0–1	Olympiacos	Athens
16:45		Report	Derbyshire 7'	Stadium: Nea Smyrni Stadium; Attendance: 4,852; Referee: Dimitris Kyrkos

7 February 2010 21	Olympiacos	5–1	Levadiakos	Piraeus
16:45	Mellberg 19'; Derbyshire 36', 53'; Mitroglou 83', 90+3'	Report	Taralidis 42'	Stadium: Karaiskakis Stadium; Attendance: 0 (closed doors); Referee: Anastasios Sidiropoulos

14 February 2010 22	Asteras Tripolis	1–3	Olympiacos	Tripoli
19:00	Eder 33'	Report	LuaLua 5', 40'; Stoltidis 8'	Stadium: Asteras Tripolis Stadium; Attendance: 2,170; Referee: Nathaniel Charalambidis

20 February 2010 23	Ergotelis	1–1	Olympiacos	Heraklion
19:00	Budimir 85'	Report	Torosidis 29'	Stadium: Pankritio Stadium; Attendance: 7,298; Referee: Ilias Spathas

28 February 2010 24	Olympiacos	2–0	Atromitos	Piraeus
16:45	Derbyshire 18'; Mitroglou 90+4'	Report		Stadium: Karaiskakis Stadium; Attendance: 21,866; Referee: Athanasios Giahos

7 March 2010 25	Iraklis	1–0	Olympiacos	Thessaloniki
19:00	Mara 6'	Report		Stadium: Kaftanzoglio Stadium; Attendance: 5,471; Referee: Georgios Daloukas

13 March 2010 26	Olympiacos	2–2	PAS Giannina	Piraeus
19:00	Derbyshire 39'; LuaLua 45'	Report	A. Papadopoulos 37' (o.g.); Mellberg 54' (o.g.)	Stadium: Karaiskakis Stadium; Attendance: 15,969; Referee: Michail Dakos

21 March 2010 27	Panathinaikos	0–1	Olympiacos	Athens
19:00		Report	Derbyshire 67'	Stadium: Olympic Stadium; Attendance: 61,135; Referee: Georgios Daloukas

28 March 2010 28	Olympiacos	0–0	Skoda Xanthi	Piraeus
19:00		Report		Stadium: Karaiskakis Stadium; Attendance: 18,010; Referee: Vassilios Paboridis

11 April 2010 29	Panthrakikos	0–2	Olympiacos	Komotini
19:00		Report	Torosidis 11'; Mitroglou 29'	Stadium: Komotini Stadium; Attendance: 2,554; Referee: Nathaniel Charalambidis

18 April 2010 30	Olympiacos	2–1	Aris	Piraeus
19:00	Żewłakow 33'; Maresca 45+5'	Report	Calvo 42'	Stadium: Karaiskakis Stadium; Attendance: 14,217; Referee: Michail Dakos

==== Play-offs ====
Pos	Team	Pld	W	D	L	GF	GA	GD	Pts	Qualification
2	PAOK	6	4	1	1	7	3	+4	16	Qualification for the Champions League third qualifying round
3	AEK Athens	6	2	2	2	8	7	+1	9	Qualification for the Europa League play-off round (Note: Since Aris lost the 2009–10 Greek Football Cup Final against Champions League-qualified Panathinaikos, all Europa League spots will be determined by the play-off group positions.)
4	Aris	6	2	2	2	8	9	−1	8 (Note: Head-to-head record: Aris–Olympiacos 2–0, Olympiacos–Aris 0–0.)	Qualification for the Europa League third qualifying round
5	Olympiacos	6	1	1	4	3	7	−4	8	Qualification for the Europa League second qualifying round

Source: Super League Greece: Standings and Schedule
Rules for classification: 1) points; 2) head-to-head points; 3) head-to-head goal difference; 4) head-to-head goals scored; 5) goal difference; 6) number of goals scored.
Notes:

28 April 2010 1	Aris	2–0	Olympiacos	Thessaloniki
19:00	Johnson 40', 90+3'	Report		Stadium: Kleanthis Vikelidis Stadium; Attendance: 6,639; Referee: Giorgos Daloukas

2 May 2010 2	Olympiacos	2–1	AEK Athens	Piraeus
19:00	Mellberg 10'; Maresca 43'	Report	Djebbour 22' (pen.)	Stadium: Karaiskakis Stadium; Attendance: 18,697; Referee: Stavros Tsirtsonis

9 May 2010 3	PAOK	1–0	Olympiacos	Thessaloniki
19:00	Muslimović 11'	Report		Stadium: Toumba Stadium; Attendance: 24,109; Referee: Anastasios Kakos

12 May 2010 4	Olympiacos	0–1	PAOK	Piraeus
16:45		Report	Ivić 33'	Stadium: Karaiskakis Stadium; Attendance: 15,829; Referee: Giorgos Daloukas

16 May 2010 5	Olympiacos	0–0	Aris	Piraeus
19:00		Report		Stadium: Karaiskakis Stadium; Attendance: 7,088; Referee: Michalis Dakos

19 May 2010 6	AEK Athens	2–1	Olympiacos	Athens
21:15	Manolas 6'; Blanco 54'	Report	Y. Papadopoulos 10'	Stadium: Olympic Stadium; Attendance: 14,738; Referee: Anastasios Kakos

=== Greek Cup ===
==== Fourth round ====
All times at EET

27 October 2009	Panserraikos	3–1	Olympiacos	Serres
17:00	Leozinho 17'; Athanasiadis 52'; Rimoldi 83' (pen.)	Report	Mitroglou 66'	Stadium: Serres Municipal Stadium; Referee: Nathaniel Charalambidis

=== UEFA Champions League ===
==== Third qualifying round ====
All times at EET

29 July 2009 First leg	Slovan Bratislava (Slovakia)	0–2	(Greece) Olympiacos	Bratislava, Slovakia
21:00		(Report)	Papadopoulos 2'; Leonardo 22'	Stadium: Tehelné pole Attendance: 21,250; Referee: Claudio Circhetta (Switzerland)

5 August 2009 Second leg	Olympiacos (Greece)	2–0 (4–0 agg.)	(Slovakia) Slovan Bratislava	Piraeus, Greece
21:45	Maresca 35'; Diogo 56'	(Report)		Stadium: Karaiskakis Stadium; Attendance: 26,137; Referee: Konrad Plautz (Austria)

==== Play-off round ====
All times at EET

18 August 2009 First leg	Sheriff Tiraspol (Moldova)	0–2	(Greece) Olympiacos	Tiraspol, Moldova
21:45		(Report)	Dudu 46'; Mitroglou 81'	Stadium: Sheriff Stadium; Attendance: 12,500; Referee: Martin Atkinson (England

26 August 2009 Second leg	Olympiacos (Greece)	1–0 (3–0 agg.)	(Moldova) Sheriff Tiraspol	Piraeus, Greece
21:45	Mitroglou 82'	(Report)		Stadium: Karaiskakis Stadium; Attendance: 27,633; Referee: Alberto Undiano Mallenco (Spain)

==== Group stage ====
All times at EET

16 September 2009 1	Olympiacos (Greece)	1–0	(Netherlands) AZ	Piraeus, Greece
21:45	Torosidis 79'	Report		Stadium: Karaiskakis Stadium; Attendance: 29,018; Referee: Viktor Kassai (Hungary)

29 September 2009 2	Arsenal (England)	2–0	(Greece) Olympiacos	London, England
21:45	Van Persie 78'; Arshavin 86'	Report		Stadium: Emirates Stadium; Attendance: 59,884; Referee: Stéphane Lannoy (France)

20 October 2009 3	Olympiacos (Greece)	2–1	(Belgium) Standard Liège	Piraeus, Greece
21:45	Mitroglou 43'; Stoltidis 90+3'	Report	de Camargo 37'	Stadium: Karaiskakis Stadium; Attendance: 29,889; Referee: Pedro Proença (Portugal)

4 November 2009 4	Standard Liège (Belgium)	2–0	(Greece) Olympiacos	Liège, Belgium
21:45	Mbokani 31'; Jovanović 88'	Report		Stadium: Stade Maurice Dufrasne; Attendance: 24,787; Referee: Nicola Rizzoli (Italy)

24 November 2009 5	AZ (Netherlands)	0–0	(Greece) Olympiacos	Alkmaar, Netherlands
21:45		Report		Stadium: DSB Stadion; Attendance: 16,213; Referee: Alberto Undiano Mallenco (Spain)

9 December 2009 6	Olympiacos (Greece)	1–0	(England) Arsenal	Piraeus, Greece
21:45	Leonardo 47'	Report		Stadium: Karaiskakis Stadium; Attendance: 30,277; Referee: Lucílio Batista (Portugal)

Standings

Pos	Team	Pld	W	D	L	GF	GA	GD	Pts	Qualification
1	(England) Arsenal	6	4	1	1	12	5	+7	13	Advance to knockout phase
2	(Greece) Olympiacos	6	3	1	2	4	5	−1	10	Advance to knockout phase
3	(Belgium) Standard Liège	6	1	2	3	7	9	−2	5	Transfer to Europa League
4	(Netherlands) AZ	6	0	4	2	4	8	−4	4	

Source: RSSSF

==== Knockout stage ====
===== Round of 16 =====
All times at EET

23 February 2010 First leg	Olympiacos (Greece)	0–1	(France) Bordeaux	Piraeus, Greece
21:45		Report	Ciani 45+2'	Stadium: Karaiskakis Stadium; Attendance: 29,773; Referee: Howard Webb (England)

17 March 2010 Second leg	Bordeaux (France)	2–1 (3–1 agg.)	(Greece) Olympiacos	Bordeaux, France
21:45	Gourcuff 5'; Chamakh 88'	Report	Mitroglou 65'	Stadium: Stade Chaban-Delmas; Attendance: 31,004; Referee: Olegário Benquerença (Portugal)

== Team kit ==
Home	Away	Third	Fourth

== Individual Awards ==
Name	Pos.	Award
(Greece) Vasilis Torosidis	Right-back	Super League Greece Greek Player of the Season
