= Geraldo =

Geraldo may refer to:

== People ==
- Geraldo (name), a given name
- Geraldo (bandleader), stage name of English bandleader Gerald Walcan Bright (1904–1974)
- Geraldo (footballer, born 1974), Brazilian footballer Geraldo Moreira da Silva Júnior
- Geraldo (footballer, born 1991), Angolan footballer Hermenegildo da Costa Paulo Bartolomeu
- Geraldo (footballer, born 1994), Brazilian footballer Geraldo Rocha Pereira

== Other uses ==
- Geraldo (talk show), a daytime television tabloid talk show

== See also ==
- Giraldo
- Heraldo
