= Geraldo (name) =

Geraldo is a masculine given name. It is the Spanish, Italian, and Portuguese equivalent of Gerald. It may refer to:

== Notable individuals ==
- Geraldo, English bandleader (1904–1974)
- Geraldo Alckmin, Brazilian politician
- Geraldo Alves (footballer, born 1980), Portuguese
- Geraldo Cleofas Dias Alves, Brazilian international footballer
- Geraldo Boldewijn, American football player
- Geraldo Gonzalez, Cuban boxer known as Kid Gavilán
- Geraldo Guzman, baseball player
- Geraldo Majella Agnelo, Brazilian priest
- Geraldo Moreira da Silva Júnior, Brazilian football player
- Geraldo de Proença Sigaud, Brazilian priest
- Geraldo Rivera, American television personality, host on the Geraldo talk show
- Geraldo Rocha Pereira, Brazilian footballer
- Geraldo dos Santos Júnior, Brazilian football player
- Leonardo de Jesus Geraldo, Brazilian footballer

== Fictional characters ==
- Geraldo Russo, a.k.a. Jerry Russo, a character from Wizards of Waverly Place
- The Mystic Shopkeeper Geraldo, one of the Heroes in Bloons Tower Defense 6

== Nickname ==
- Hermenegildo da Costa Paulo Bartolomeu, Angolan footballer

== See also ==
- Giraldo
- Heraldo
- Gerardo
