= Edu Coimbra =

Brazilian footballer (born 1947)

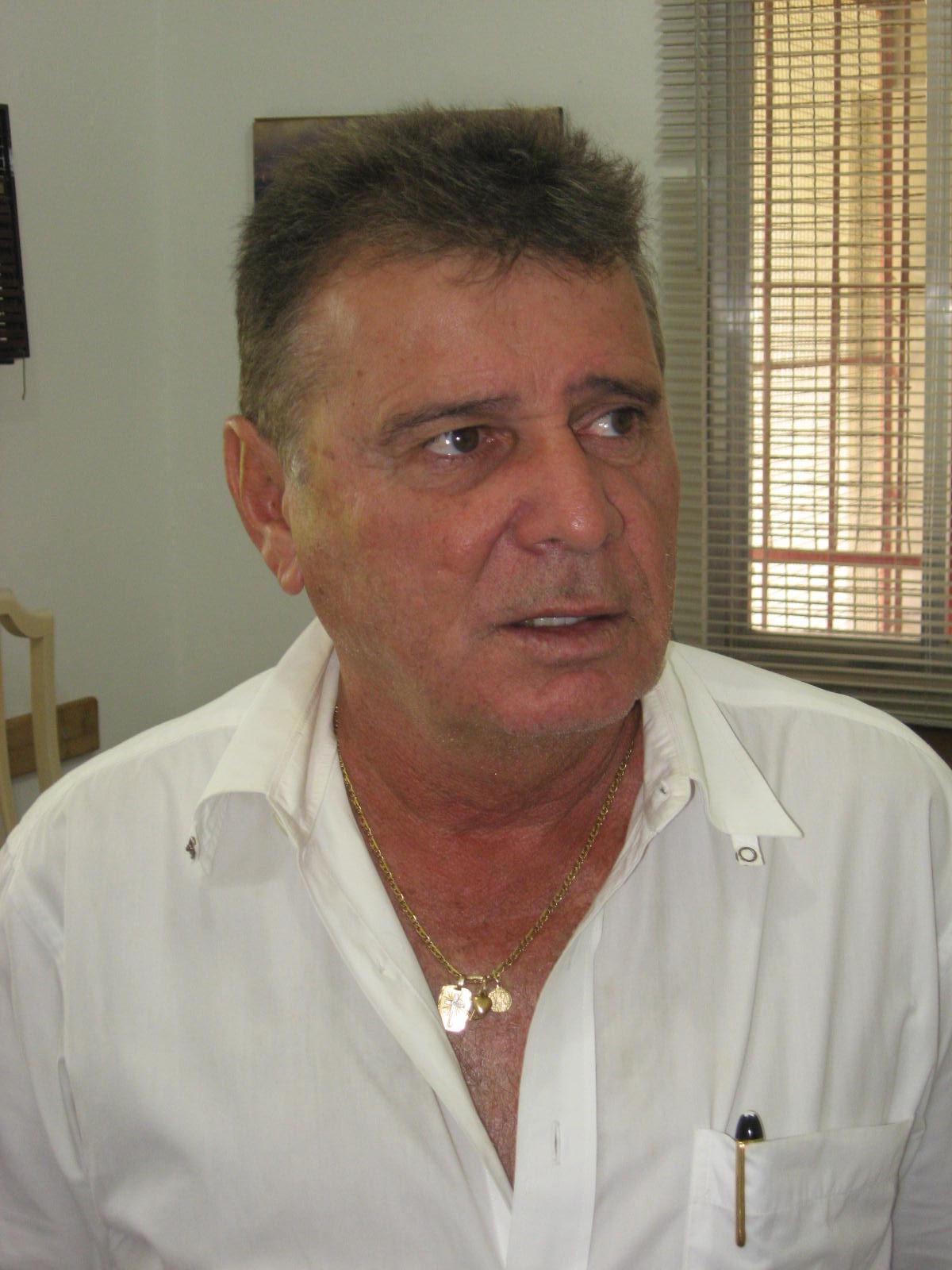

Personal information
- Full name: Eduardo Antunes Coimbra
- Date of birth: February 5, 1947 (age 79)
- Place of birth: Rio de Janeiro, Brazil
- Position: Attacking midfielder

Youth career
- 1960–1966: America

Senior career*
Years	Team	Apps	(Gls)
1966–1974	America	402	(212)
1975	Vasco da Gama		
1975	Bahia		
1975–1976	Flamengo	24	(6)
1976–1977	Colorado		
1978	Joinville		
1979	Brasília		
1980–1981	Campo Grande		

International career
1967–1974	Brazil	3	(0)

Managerial career
- 1982: America
- 1983–1984: Brazil
- 1984–1985: Vasco da Gama
- 1986: Iraq
- 1987: Joinville
- 1987: Criciúma
- 1988: Barcelona de Guayaquil
- 1989: Coritiba
- 1990: Botafogo
- 1991: Veracruz
- 1992: Sport Boys
- 1992: Remo
- 1993: Fluminense
- 1994: Campo Grande
- 1994–1995: Kashima Antlers
- 2002–2006: Japan (assistant)
- 2006–2008: Fenerbahçe (assistant)
- 2008–2009: Bunyodkor (assistant)
- 2009: CSKA (assistant)
- 2009–2010: Olympiacos (assistant)
- 2011–2012: Iraq (assistant)
- * Club domestic league appearances and goals

Eduardo Antunes Coimbra (born February 5, 1947), better known as Edu, is a former Brazilian footballer who played as an attacking midfielder and went on to become a manager.

== Background ==
He was one of the most talented dribblers of the 1970s and is considered one of the best players in America Football Club's history. He scored 212 goals for America—which makes him the second highest scorer for the club—and also played for Vasco da Gama, Bahia and Flamengo.

== Early life ==
Edu came from a lower-middle-class family, in the suburbs of Quintino, Rio de Janeiro. His father was a goalkeeper and three of his brothers were professional footballers as well. However the most famous was Zico.

== Career ==
They played together in 1976 in Flamengo.

== Coaching career ==
He was a member of Zico's veteran team in Turkey during the coaching period of his brother Zico at Fenerbahce. The team has Brazilian members as Roberto Carlos's father Oscar Silva, Edu's brother and Fenerbahçe manager Zico, Fenerbahçe conditioner Moraci Sant'Anna (who was 3 World Cup coach of Brazil), Marco Aurélio's uncle Sebastião and Edu Dracena's brother whom were all playing or coaching for Fenerbahçe at that time.

He was also the assistant manager of Russia club CSKA Moscow, the team formerly managed by his brother and Brazil football legend Zico.

He is currently the assistant manager of Iraq national football team.

== Honours ==
=== Player ===
- Copa Rio Branco 1967 – Brazil
- Taça Guanabara: 1974
- Bahia State Championship: 1975

=== Coach ===
- Taça Rio 1982
- Tournament of the Champions: 1982
- Paraná State Championship: 1989
- Rio State Championship: 1990
- Süper Lig: 2007

=== Individual ===
- Torneio Roberto Gomes Pedrosa's top scorer: 1969
