= Geraldo Pereira =

Geraldo Pereira may refer to:

- Gerald Pereira (1929–1976), Indian freedom fighter, author, lawyer and trade unionist.
- Geraldo Dutra Pereira (born 1963), Brazilian footballer
- Geraldo Rocha Pereira (born 1994), Brazilian footballer
- Geraldo Theodoro Pereira (1918-1955), Brazilian composer and samba star
- Geraldo Touro (born 1958), full name Geraldo Pereira, Brazilian footballer
