= Lomana LuaLua =

Congolese footballer

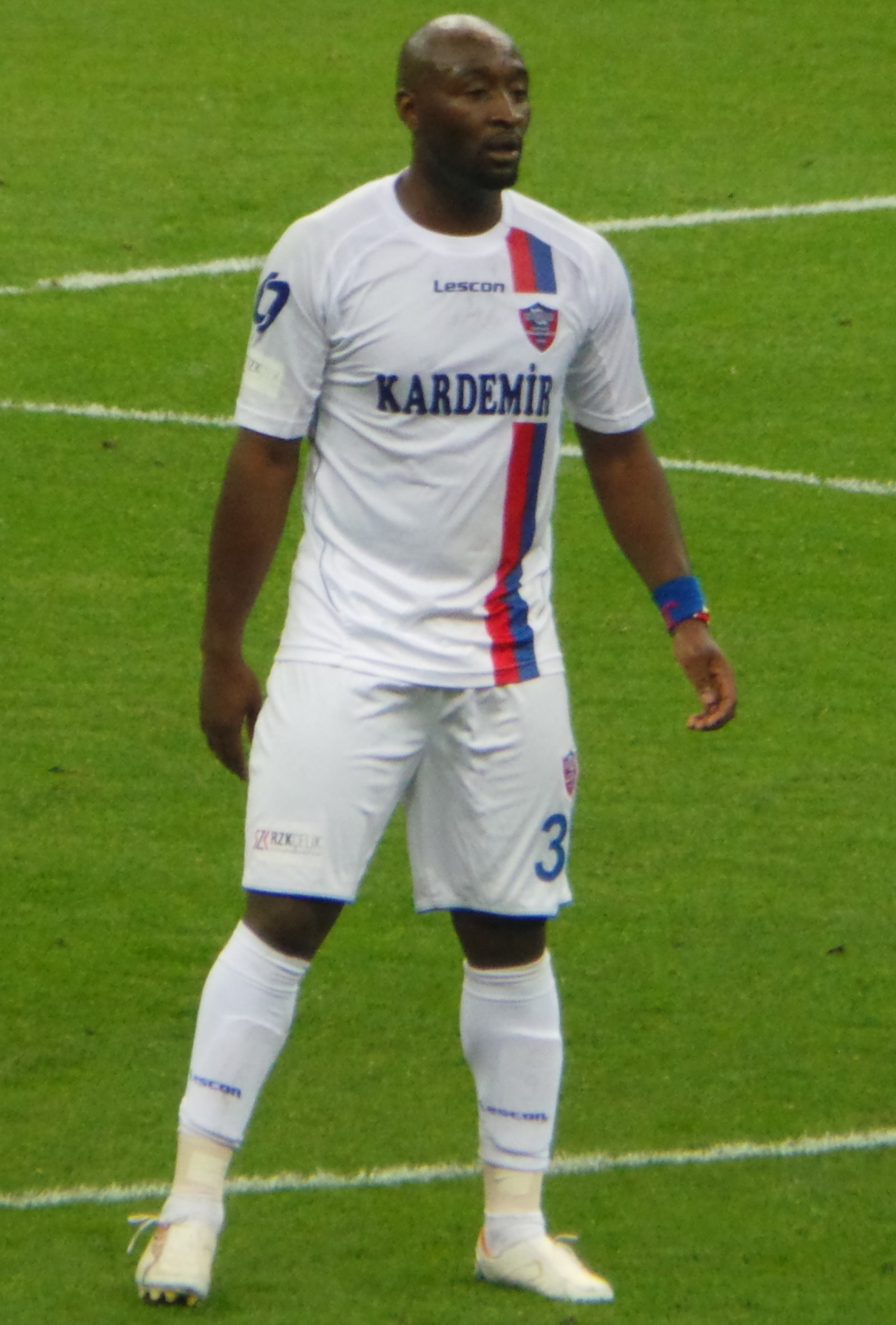
- LuaLua playing for Kardemir Karabükspor in 2013

Personal information
- Full name: Trésor Lomana LuaLua
- Date of birth: 28 December 1980 (age 45)
- Place of birth: Kinshasa, Zaire
- Height: 5 ft 8 in (1.73 m)
- Positions: Striker; winger

Senior career*
Years	Team	Apps	(Gls)
1998–2000	Colchester United	61	(15)
2000–2004	Newcastle United	59	(5)
2004	→ Portsmouth (loan)	15	(4)
2004–2007	Portsmouth	72	(15)
2007–2008	Olympiacos	21	(5)
2008–2009	Al-Arabi	11	(2)
2009–2010	Olympiacos	12	(3)
2010–2011	Omonia	19	(4)
2011–2012	Blackpool	29	(4)
2012–2014	Karabükspor	42	(13)
2014–2015	Çaykur Rizespor	19	(4)
2015–2016	Akhisar Belediyespor	24	(1)
2016	Şanlıurfaspor	16	(2)
2017–2018	Merit Alsancak Yeşilova	23	(9)
2018–2019	Doğan Türk Birliği	8	(5)
2019	Gìrne Halk Evì	7	(4)
2019–2020	Peterborough Sports	1	(0)
Total		439	(95)

International career
2002–2013	DR Congo	31	(7)
- * Club domestic league appearances and goals

Trésor Lomana LuaLua (/ˈtrɛzɔːr ləˈmɑːnə luˌɑːluˈɑː/; born 28 December 1980) is a Congolese former professional footballer who played as a striker. He is currently the attacking coach for Spalding United.

LuaLua was born in Kinshasa, but moved to England at a young age. After impressing in a college football match, he signed for Colchester United. There he scored a total of 21 goals in 68 appearances, which prompted Newcastle United to sign him. However, the competition for places meant he was less of a regular in the first team, and after four seasons and 88 appearances he transferred to Portsmouth, where he had previously been on loan for three months from Newcastle. He remained there for three seasons, but his spell was marred by disciplinary problems and malaria. After leaving Portsmouth, he moved teams frequently, representing sides in Greece, Qatar, Cyprus and Turkey, in addition to a brief return to English football at Blackpool. LuaLua received his first of 31 international caps in 2002, and scored seven goals in an eleven-year international career. He represented his national team at four Africa Cup of Nations tournaments.

LuaLua is also known for setting up the LuaLua Foundation, which provides care for orphans in the Democratic Republic of the Congo, and for being a patron for the Haslar Visitors Group. His brother Kazenga, and cousins Trésor Kandol and Yannick Bolasie, all became footballers as well.

== Early life ==
LuaLua was born Trésor Lua Lua Lomana – Lua Lua, his grandfather's given name, was passed to him and his brother Kazenga – in Kinshasa, Zaire (now Democratic Republic of the Congo), in 1980, but moved to England as a young boy in 1989. His family settled in Forest Gate in London; there, he attended Forest Gate Community School and started to play football at the age of 16, while also being involved in gymnastics. His activity in gymnastics was the base of his trademark goal celebration, seven back flips and a backward somersault. LuaLua represented his school at football after he was spotted kicking a tennis ball around in the playground. He was playing for Leyton Sixth Form College, where he studied performing arts, when he was spotted at the age of 17 by second division side, Colchester United. Geoff Harrop, a scout for Colchester College's football team, was impressed by LuaLua's performance, "He was taking on the whole team by the end of the game and it wasn't hard to pick him out among 22 young 17-year-olds." Harrop invited the striker for a trial at Colchester United and he was signed by the club.

His brother, Kazenga LuaLua, is also a professional footballer, and two of his cousins also play professionally, Yannick Bolasie and Trésor Kandol.

== Club career ==
=== Colchester United ===
LuaLua joined Colchester United in September 1998. Initially, he struggled to adapt and he preferred going to nightclubs over playing for Colchester, Harrop says, "It took a lot of hard work by the staff at Colchester. Micky Cook, the director of youth, had to spend endless hours with him and [manager] Steve Wignall and then [the next manager] Steve Whitton had to spend a lot of time with him talking him through the tactical side of the game and what his role was within the team". LuaLua scored within four minutes of his debut where he appeared as a substitute in a 3–1 defeat to Chesterfield. In two seasons, he made 68 league and cup appearances for Colchester, 44 starts and 24 substitute appearances, scoring a total of 21 goals.

His performances attracted the attention of several Premiership clubs, and despite manager Steve Whitton's denial that LuaLua was for sale LuaLua joined Newcastle United in September 2000 for a fee of £2.25 million. An earlier offer by Newcastle of £300,000 for LuaLua made by former manager, Ruud Gullit, had been rejected, but the much increased bid offered financial security and assistance towards a new ground and was one that Colchester felt they could not turn down.

=== Newcastle United ===
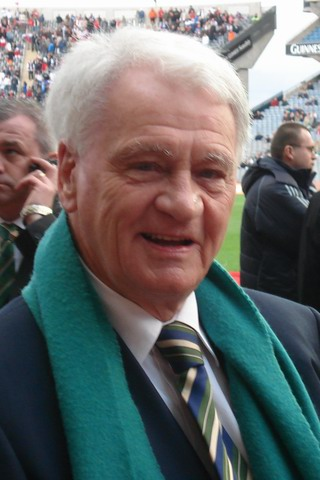
Bobby Robson saw LuaLua as a "very promising talent"

LuaLua had been brought to the attention of Newcastle manager, Bobby Robson, by Mick Wadsworth, assistant-manager at Newcastle United, who was a former manager of Colchester. Robson watched LuaLua before deciding to negotiate the transfer, and said, "I see [LuaLua] as a special talent. He has to learn how to play with the other players but he's a special new talent. He has to be nursed and cherished and taught. But we are buying long-term a very promising talent, a very promising player." LuaLua signed a five-year contract with the club. He made his first-team debut in a 1–0 home defeat to Charlton Athletic in September 2000 and made 23 league and cup appearances for Newcastle in the 2000–01 season without scoring. He scored twice in Newcastle's Intertoto Cup campaign at the beginning of the 2001–02 season but his first Premiership goal did not come until April 2002, when he scored a last-minute winner in a 3–2 away win against Derby County. He scored a further two goals in the remaining four games of the season. LuaLua's goalscoring form continued into the beginning of the 2002–03 season when he scored three goals in his first four games, but tougher competition for a first-team place meant that LuaLua made only 22 appearances throughout that season. In January 2003, LuaLua had urged Robson to rotate the squad, saying, "I think I deserve a chance now, as do many of the lads on the fringes of the team. Although some people might have the idea that those of us not in the team like sitting on the bench and getting paid good money, nothing could be further from the truth. I'm not in this for the money, I want to play for the first team and show what I can do on a regular basis." LuaLua also spent much of the beginning of the 2003–04 season on the bench and in November 2003, complained about his lack of first-team football and indicated that he would consider leaving Newcastle. In the Newcastle Chronicle, Robson responded, saying he would not take advice from a player about how to manage the side: "How dare he say this? I run this football club... LuaLua has been a pretty poor professional about all this. What he should do is keep his mouth shut and get out there and do what he is paid for." In the end, he made 88 league and cup appearances for Newcastle, scoring nine goals, having started 21 games and made 67 appearances as a substitute.

=== Portsmouth ===
In February 2004, after returning from the 2004 African Cup of Nations, he joined Portsmouth on a three-month loan deal with a view to a permanent deal at the end of the season. LuaLua scored on his debut for Portsmouth in a 4–3 away defeat to Tottenham Hotspur in February 2004. During this loan spell he scored in the 89th minute in a 1–1 draw for Portsmouth against parent club Newcastle. The result lifted Portsmouth out of the bottom three of the Premiership. This also led to a change in legislation with the FA introducing standard rules meaning a player on loan could not play against their parent club. He scored four goals in 15 appearances for Portsmouth as they finished in mid-table in their debut season in the Premiership. Manager Harry Redknapp was sufficiently impressed with LuaLua's performances that when his loan spell ended at the end of the 2003–04 season, he signed LuaLua permanently at a cost of £1.75 million.

"I think Lua showed a little bit of a reaction. He has apologised to us for it. I think Lua has touched foreheads with the lad,"

— Joe Jordan, then a coach at Portsmouth, commenting on LuaLua's dismissal against Blackburn Rovers.

LuaLua made 26 league and cup appearances, scoring six goals, including two against local rivals Southampton, in the 2004–05 season. The season was marred by a groin injury at the beginning and a hamstring injury in May 2005. Disciplinary problems led to charges by the Football Association of abusive behaviour in December 2004 and improper conduct after he was sent off against Blackburn Rovers in January 2005, for which he received an extra one-match ban and a fine of £5,000 in addition to a three-match ban for the dismissal.

He made 26 appearances in the 2005–06 season, scoring seven goals, but missed several games in the autumn after contracting malaria on a visit to Africa to play for DR Congo. He also missed several games due to international duty at the 2006 African Cup of Nations and missed games in April 2006 after damaging his foot while doing his acrobatic goal celebration during a game against Arsenal. His disciplinary problems continued when he was warned by the Football Association over his future conduct; this came after he admitted a charge of improper conduct in relation to comments made about referee Uriah Rennie after a 3–1 defeat at Tottenham Hotspur in December. LuaLua signed a new three-year contract in July 2006; it was set to keep him at Portsmouth until 2009.

An ankle injury suffered in a pre-season friendly led to LuaLua missing the beginning of the 2006–07 season. He struggled to break back into the first-team, making only eight starts out of 24 appearances, and scored only two goals in that season. Redknapp warned him that he needed to "...start performing" and that he had to "...start producing next season". He joined Greek club Olympiacos in August 2007 and Redknapp admitted that, "Lua wants to move on... I've no doubt he'll go away and be a great player for Olympiacos. He wants a change, he wants to play in a role behind the strikers and he wants to move abroad. He will get to play in the Champions League by moving to Greece. He has been a top Premier League player and he'll be a top player for them."

=== Olympiacos ===
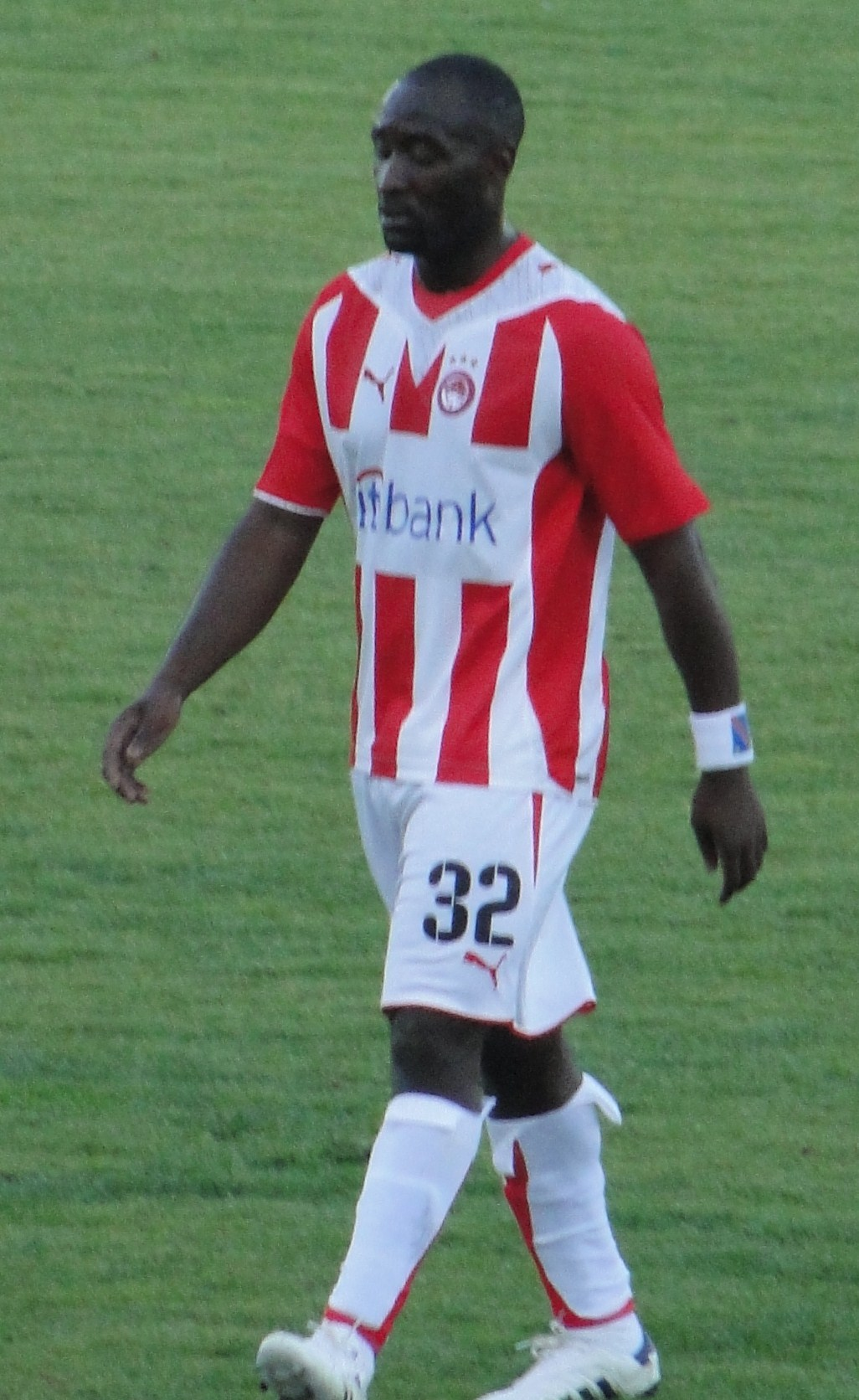
LuaLua playing for Olympiacos in a match against PAOK.

On 12 August 2007, LuaLua signed a three-year contract with Olympiacos for an estimated fee of £2.8 million (€4.1 million). He made his league debut on 2 September, in a 0–0 draw against Panathinaikos. His Champions League debut came on 18 September in a 1–1 draw against Lazio. LuaLua scored his first two goals on 23 September in a 6–2 win over OFI.

On 16 January 2008, LuaLua opened the scoring with a 30-yard volley in the Greek Cup fifth round, which saw Olympiacos progress to the quarter-finals in a 4–0 win against Panathinaikos. LuaLua missed both the knockout stages against Chelsea, having suffered from ankle injuries and a dislocated shoulder, the latter of which he received in a 1–1 draw against Asteras Tripolis. As a result, he missed most of the season, but returned on 20 April 2008 to help Olympiacos win their fourth Super League Greece title, beating Iraklis 3–1. Before the 2008 Greek Cup Final on 17 May, LuaLua fell out of favour and was deemed surplus to requirements. In total, he made 30 appearances for Olympiacos, scoring six goals.

=== Al-Arabi ===
Following his injury spell at Olympiacos, LuaLua joined Qatari based club Al-Arabi on a one-year contract in July 2008. On 30 October, Al-Arabi won the Sheikh Jassim Cup, beating Al-Rayyan Club 3–0 in the final with LuaLua scoring one goal in the seventh minute. In the 21st week of the 2008–09 season, on 20 February 2009, LuaLua scored his first league goal for the club in a 4–2 defeat to Al-Khor. His only other goal for that season came in a 1–0 win over Al-Kharitiyath on 16 April.

=== Return to Olympiacos ===
During December 2009, LuaLua left Al-Arabi by mutual consent and rejoined Olympiakos on a six-month contract with an option for the club to extend the contract for two years. LuaLua scored the first goals of his second spell with a brace against Asteras Tripolis.

=== Omonia ===
LuaLua signed a two-year contract for an undisclosed fee with Omonia in July 2010, reuniting with Takis Lemonis for the second time since Olympiakos in 2008. He scored his first goal on his league debut on 18 September 2010 in a 4–0 win against Alki Larnaca, coming on as a substitute for Georgios Efrem. On 18 May 2011, LuaLua won the Cypriot Cup with Omonia after winning 4–3 on penalties against Apollon Limassol.

=== Return to England ===
In September 2011, after his release by Omonia, LuaLua trained with League One club Hartlepool United, where he linked up with former Newcastle United assistant-manager Mick Wadsworth. He was then offered a contract by Blackpool, a level above in the Championship, which he signed on 13 October.

=== Turkey ===
On 24 May 2012, it was confirmed that LuaLua had turned down a new contract at Blackpool and had signed a two-year deal with Turkish side Kardemir Karabükspor. He was considered one of the best players in the first half of the Turkish league.

On 2 February 2015, LuaLua signed a contract with Akhisar Belediyespor. He left the club in January 2016, and signed a contract with Şanlıurfaspor the following month, leaving in May 2016.

=== Northern Cyprus ===
On 12 May 2017, LuaLua signed a contract with Northern Cypriot club Merit Alsancak Yeşilova. He played his first friendly game against Bostancı Bağcıl on 11 August. LuaLua ended the 2017–18 KTFF Süper Lig season with nine goals in 23 appearances. After leaving the club in 2018, LuaLua played for English non-league side Tilbury in July; featuring for the second half of a 1–0 friendly win versus Hashtag United. For the 2018–19 campaign, LuaLua returned to Northern Cyprus to play with Süper Lig teams Doğan Türk Birliği and Gìrne Halk Evì.

=== Peterborough Sports ===
On 13 November 2019, Southern League Premier Division Central side Peterborough Sports announced the signing of LuaLua. He made his debut for the club in January 2020, coming off the bench in a league match against Hitchin Town.

== International career ==
=== 2002 and 2004 Africa Cup of Nations ===
LuaLua was first named by the DR Congo national team in the preliminary squad for the African Nations Cup finals in Mali in January 2002. He played in the 0–0 draw with Togo, the 1–0 loss to Cameroon, the 3–1 win over Ivory Coast and the quarter-final match against Senegal, which DR Congo lost 2–0 amid some controversy. LuaLua blamed the referee Domenico Messina for the defeat: "We had a lot of fouls which the referee didn't give and there was a penalty right in front of him but he just let the match go on. Sometimes they [the Senegalese] fell over without being touched, screamed, and the referee just gave the foul to them."

"Lomana knows he's been stupid. He knew he was going to be under pressure and he knew he was going to get provoked... but I don't like the way their players behaved. They were taking dives all over the place. That's not fair play. It's disgraceful."

— —DR Congo manager Mick Wadsworth, who was also assistant manager at Newcastle during Robson's reign, agreed with LuaLua about the conduct of the Tunisia players in their 2004 African Nations Cup match.

DR Congo's qualifying campaign for the 2004 African Nations Cup in Tunisia began six months after the 2002 tournament ended, with a match against Libya on 8 September. Libya won the match 3–2. LuaLua initially indicated that he might not play in the match, but did so reluctantly after threats were made to his family, which caused him to reconsider his international career. Robson commented, "He didn't want to go and play in that match. But he said he had to go because his grandmother had been threatened." He played in the 2–0 win over Botswana in October 2002, when he scored inside five minutes but was later sent off for dissent. He was suspended for two matches and his next appearance was in the 0–0 draw with Botswana in July 2003, which secured qualification for the finals of the competition. LuaLua initially expressed doubts that he would take part in the finals due to club commitments. He was, however, included in the squad and named as captain in the absence of regular captain Shabani Nonda, who missed the tournament due to a knee injury. LuaLua said on being named as captain, "When Shabani plays, it takes the pressure off me but now everyone's now looking to me for leadership and I feel honoured." He appeared in the first match of the tournament, a 2–1 defeat to Guinea, but in the next match against the hosts Tunisia, he was sent off, reacting angrily and taking several minutes to leave the pitch. DR Congo went on to lose the match and were eliminated from the tournament. Following his sending off, LuaLua considered giving up international football and criticised the behaviour of the Tunisia players during the match and the organisation of the tournament. He later criticised the national football federation of the Democratic Republic of the Congo, the Congolese Association Football Federation, blaming them for the poor state of the national side, but said that he would continue to be available for international selection: "I can never turn my back on my country. I play for Congo because I am proud to do it." He apologised to his country for his sending off against Tunisia.

=== 2006 Africa Cup of Nations ===
LuaLua received a four-match suspension for the sending-off and missed several 2006 World Cup qualifying round matches during the summer of June 2004. He was selected for the World Cup qualifier against South Africa in September, but missed the match due to injury, and was then dropped for the next qualifier against Ghana in October. He missed the 1–1 draw with Ghana in March 2005 after a dispute with the DR Congo football association but committed himself to the match against Uganda in June. He scored in a friendly against Guinea played in Paris in August, a match used as preparation for the World Cup qualifying matches the following month. LuaLua played for DR Congo in the 2–1 win over Cape Verde in September but contracted malaria and missed the final World Cup qualifier against South Africa in October.

"We are still waiting for it to be resolved but we are united and as captain I'll stick up for everyone."

— LuaLua, speaking after the 2–0 victory over Togo. Before the match DR Congo's president Joseph Kabila promised the pay dispute would be resolved.

LuaLua was recalled to the DR Congo squad for a friendly against Tunisia played near Paris in November 2005, as part of the countries' preparation for the 2006 African Nations Cup held in Egypt in January and February 2006. He was unable to play, however, after he was one of several players refused a visa by French immigration authorities. He was named as the captain of DR Congo for the tournament in place of Shabani Nonda who was injured for a second successive Nations Cup. He then delayed his departure to be available to his club Portsmouth for a crucial league match, missing a friendly with Senegal. Despite a pay dispute leading to the DR Congo players threatening to boycott the match, which was only resolved shortly before the kickoff, he returned to the side for DR Congo's opening match of the tournament against Togo, assisting in one goal and scoring the other in a 2–0 win. He appeared against Angola and Cameroon as DR Congo qualified for the quarter-finals stage of the tournament, only to be beaten by the hosts Egypt. LuaLua's 18-month-old son died while he was playing in the tournament.

=== Later international career ===
In the 2008 African Nations Cup qualifier against Ethiopia in April 2007, LuaLua scored the second goal in a 2–0 victory; the result extended their lead at the top of their group. He did not travel to Ethiopia for the away fixture in June, which DR Congo lost, as the authorities failed to send LuaLua his travel documents in time. Following the failure of DR Congo to qualify for the tournament in October, the DR Congo sports minister, Pardonne Kaliba, suspended the manager, Henri Depireux, and removed the captaincy from LuaLua.

LuaLua returned to the DR Congo squad in the 2010 World Cup qualifier against Egypt in June 2008. After returning to Greece, he complained of severe stomach pain and was rushed to hospital to have his appendix removed, ruling him out of subsequent matches for several weeks, as DR Congo moved to the top of Group 12 in the second round. Despite topping the group at that point, DR Congo were later eliminated at this stage and therefore failed to progress to the third round of qualifying.

In February 2012, national manager Claude Le Roy confirmed that he was with LuaLua in the aim of him returning to the national team for their Cup of Nations qualifier against Seychelles. He did not play that game, but in December LuaLua was named for his fourth Africa Cup of Nations, in South Africa in 2013. He started all three matches—all draws—as the team exited from Group C.

== Personal life ==
In September 2003, LuaLua was fined £175 by Newcastle Magistrates Court for watching British television without a licence.

In 2005, LuaLua became patron of the Haslar Visitors Group, a charity that works with detainees in an immigration removal centre. In the following year, he set up the LuaLua Foundation, building a hostel, sport and education complex in Kinshasa to provide care and education for orphaned children in DR Congo. He is also actively involved in the Show Racism the Red Card campaign and was involved in the launch of a new video entitled "A Safe Place", which features Premiership footballers talking about their experiences with racism. LuaLua is a born-again Christian and his former teammate at Portsmouth, Linvoy Primus, was quoted saying "We are not scared to say we pray together before games. About 45 minutes before a game we link our arms and just pray that we can glorify God."

LuaLua wrote the foreword to You Can Have Chips, the autobiography of his former manager Steve Wignall.

== Career statistics ==
=== Club ===
Appearances and goals by club, season and competition
Club	Season	League			National cup		League cup		Continental		Other		Total	
Club	Season	Division	Apps	Goals	Apps	Goals	Apps	Goals	Apps	Goals	Apps	Goals	Apps	Goals
Colchester United	1998–99	Division Two	13	1	0	0	—		—		0	0	13	1
Colchester United	1999–2000	Division Two	41	12	1	1	2	1	—		1 (Note: Appearance(s) in Football League Trophy)	0	45	14
Colchester United	2000–01	Division Two	7	2	—		2	3	—		—		9	5
Colchester United	Total		61	15	1	1	4	4	—		1	0	67	20
Newcastle United	2000–01	Premier League	21	0	2	0	—		—		—		23	0
Newcastle United	2001–02	Premier League	20	3	3	0	3	0	6 (Note: Appearance(s) in UEFA Intertoto Cup)	2	—		32	5
Newcastle United	2002–03	Premier League	11	2	1	0	1	0	9 (Note: Appearance(s) in UEFA Champions League)	2	—		22	4
Newcastle United	2003–04	Premier League	7	0	1	0	1	0	2 (Note: One appearance(s) in UEFA Champions League; one appearance in UEFA Cup)	0	—		11	0
Newcastle United	Total		59	5	7	0	5	0	17	4	—		88	9
Portsmouth (loan)	2003–04	Premier League	15	4	—		—		—		—		15	4
Portsmouth	2004–05	Premier League	25	6	0	0	1	0	—		—		26	6
Portsmouth	2005–06	Premier League	25	7	1	0	0	0	—		—		26	7
Portsmouth	2006–07	Premier League	22	2	0	0	2	0	—		—		24	2
Portsmouth	Total		72	19	1	0	3	0	—		—		76	19
Olympiacos	2007–08	Super League Greece	21	5	3	1	—		6	0	0	0	30	6
Al-Arabi	2008–09	Qatar Stars League	11	2	0	0	—		—		4 (Note: Appearance(s) in Sheikh Jassim Cup)	4	15	6
Olympiacos	2009–10	Super League Greece	12	3	0	0	—		2	0	5 (Note: Appearance(s) in Super League play-offs)	0	19	3
Omonia	2010–11	Cypriot First Division	19	4	6	2	—		3	1	0	0	28	7
Blackpool	2011–12	Championship	29	4	3	2	0	0	—		0	0	32	6
Karabükspor	2012–13	Süper Lig	30	11	2	0	—		—		—		32	11
Karabükspor	2013–14	Süper Lig	12	2	2	2	—		—		—		14	4
Karabükspor	Total		42	13	4	2	—		—		—		46	15
Rizespor	2013–14	Süper Lig	11	4	—		—		—		—		11	4
Rizespor	2014–15	Süper Lig	8	0	3	1	—		—		—		11	1
Rizespor	Total		19	4	3	1	—		—		—		22	5
Akhisar Belediyespor	2014–15	Süper Lig	14	1	—		—		—		—		14	1
Akhisar Belediyespor	2015–16	Süper Lig	10	0	4	2	—		—		—		14	2
Akhisar Belediyespor	Total		24	1	4	2	—		—		—		28	3
Şanlıurfaspor	2015–16	TFF First League	16	2	1	0	—		—		—		17	2
Merit Alsancak Yeşilova	2017–18	KTFF Süper Lig	23	9	3	3	—		—		—		26	12
Doğan Türk Birliği	2018–19	KTFF Süper Lig	8	5	—		—		—		—		8	5
Girne Halk Evi	2018–19	KTFF Süper Lig	7	4	2	0	—		—		—		9	4
Peterborough Sports	2019–20	Southern League Premier Division Central	1	0	—		—		—		0	0	1	0
Career total			439	95	38	14	12	4	28	5	10	4	527	122

=== International ===
Scores and results list DR Congo's goal tally first, score column indicates score after each LuaLua goal.

List of international goals scored by Lomana LuaLua
No.	Date	Venue	Opponent	Score	Result	Competition	Ref.
1	13 October 2002	Stade des Martyrs, DR Congo	Botswana	1–0	2–0	2004 Africa Cup of Nations qualification	
2	16 August 2005	Stade Yves-du-Manoir, France	Guinea	2–1	3–1	Friendly	
3	21 January 2006	Cairo Military Academy Stadium, Egypt	Togo	2–0	2–0	2006 Africa Cup of Nations	
4	29 April 2007	Stade des Martyrs, DR Congo	Ethiopia	2–0	2–0	2008 Africa Cup of Nations qualification	
5	20 August 2008	Stade du Vieux-Pré, Dreux, France	Togo	2–1	2–1	Friendly	
6	11 October 2008	Kamuzu Stadium, Malawi	Malawi	1–0	1–2	2010 World Cup qualification	
7	27 March 2011	Stade des Martyrs, Kinshasa, DR Congo	Mauritius	1–0	3–0	2012 Africa Cup of Nations qualification	

== Honours ==
Olympiacos

- Super League Greece: 2007–08
- Greek Super Cup: 2007

Al-Arabi

- Sheikh Jassim Cup: 2008

Omonia

- Cypriot Cup: 2010–11
