= El Heraldo =

El Heraldo ("The Herald") may refer to any of the following Spanish-language newspapers:

- El Heraldo (Colombia)
- El Heraldo de Cuba
- El Heraldo (Tegucigalpa)
- El Heraldo de Madrid, Spanish daily newspaper published 1890–1939
- El Heraldo de México
- Heraldo Filipino, student newspaper of De La Salle University-Dasmariñas in the Philippines.
- Heraldo de Aragón
- El Nuevo Heraldo, in Miami, Florida
- El Heraldo (Honduras)

== See also ==
- Giraldo, a surname
- Heraldo, a given name
