= Heraldo =

Heraldo is a masculine given name. People with that name include:

- Heraldo Bezerra (born 1946), Spanish-Brazilian footballer
- Heraldo do Monte (active from 1960), Brazilian guitar player
- Heraldo Muñoz (born 1948), Chilean permanent representative to the United Nations

== See also ==
- Heraldo de Aragón, Spanish daily newspaper
- Heraldo de Madrid, defunct Spanish newspaper
- El Heraldo (disambiguation), multiple newspapers
- Giraldo
