= Giraldo =

Giraldo is a Spanish and Italian surname. Notable people with the surname include:

- Alejandra Giraldo (born 1984), Colombian journalist, newscaster and social commentator
- Andrés Giraldo (born 1989), a Colombian footballer
- Blas Giraldo Reyes Rodríguez (born 1955), Cuban librarian and a member of Varela project
- Carla Giraldo (born 1986), a Colombian actress, model and singer
- Carmiña Giraldo (born 1976), a Colombian former professional tennis player
- Carolina Giraldo (born 1991), known as Karol G, a Colombian singer
- Daniel Giraldo (born 1992), a Colombian footballer
- David Giraldo (born 1984), Colombian forward that plays for Millonarios in the Copa Mustang
- David González Giraldo (born 1982), Colombian football goalkeeper who plays for Club Atlético Huracán in Argentina
- Greg Giraldo (1965–2010), American stand-up comedian, television personality and former lawyer
- Hernan Giraldo (born 1948), leader of the Colombian paramilitary organization Tayrona Resistance Block
- Javier Giraldo (1944–2026), Colombian priest and human rights activist
- Lauren Giraldo (born 1998), an American actress and social media influencer
- Neil Giraldo (born 1955), an American musician
- Santiago Giraldo (born 1987), Colombian male tennis player from Pereira in Colombia
- Víctor Giraldo (born 1985), Colombian football midfielder

== See also ==
- Giraldo, Antioquia, a town and municipality in Antioquia Department, Colombia
- Geraldo, a given name
  - Geraldo (disambiguation), for other uses
