= Raúl Bravo =

Spanish retired footballer (born 1981)

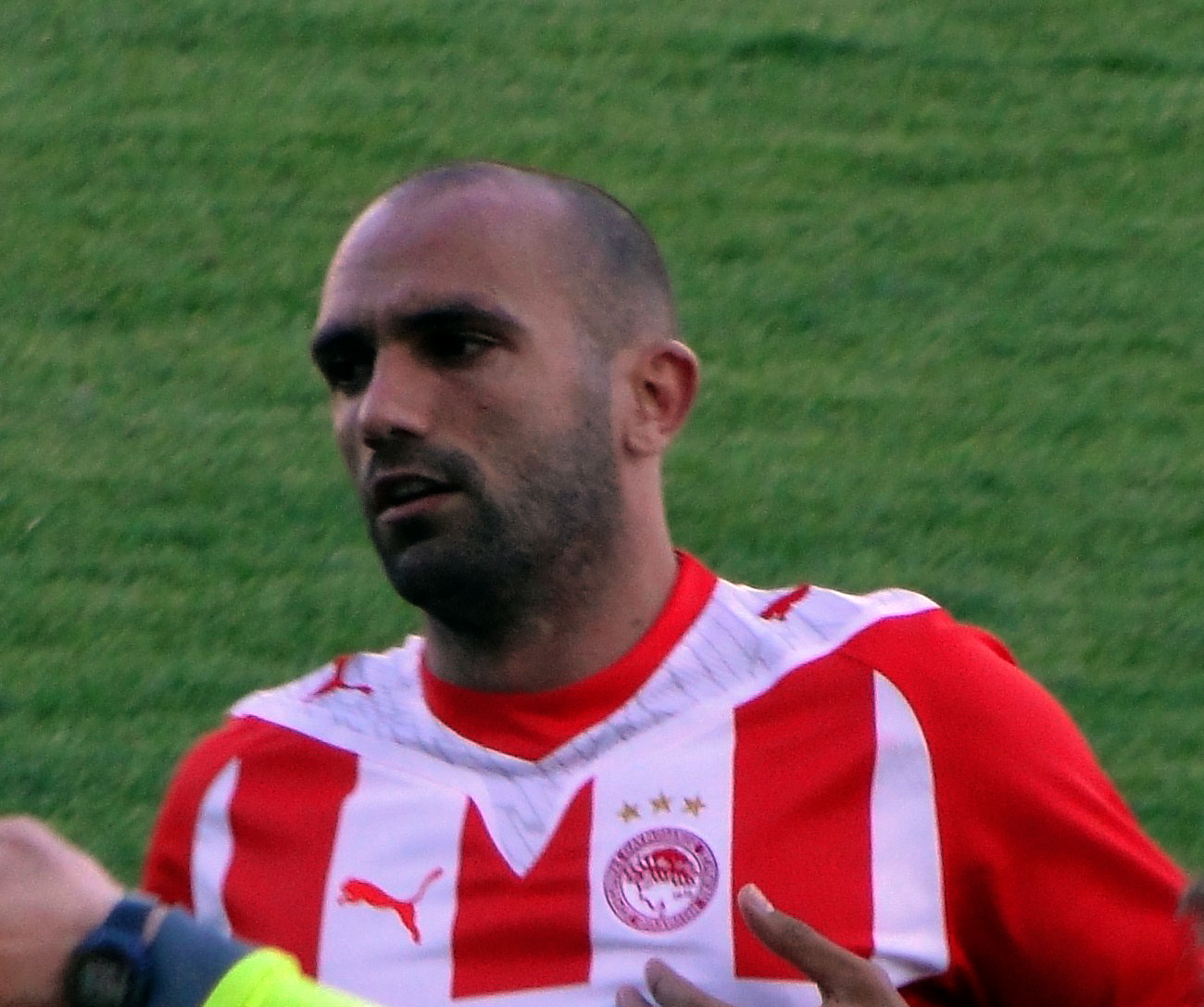
- Bravo in action for Olympiacos in 2010

Personal information
- Full name: Raúl Bravo Sanfélix
- Date of birth: 14 April 1981 (age 45)
- Place of birth: Gandia, Spain
- Height: 1.76 m (5 ft 9 1/2 in)
- Position: Defender

Youth career
- 1987–1996: Palma CF
- 1996: Gandía
- 1997–2000: Real Madrid

Senior career*
Years	Team	Apps	(Gls)
1996–1997	Gandía	21	(4)
2000–2001	Real Madrid C	7	(0)
2001–2002	Real Madrid B	40	(2)
2001–2007	Real Madrid	77	(4)
2003	→ Leeds United (loan)	5	(0)
2007–2011	Olympiacos	63	(0)
2009	→ Numancia (loan)	6	(0)
2011–2012	Rayo Vallecano	6	(0)
2012–2013	Beerschot	12	(0)
2013–2014	Córdoba	31	(1)
2014–2015	Veria	23	(1)
2015–2017	Aris	25	(1)
2016	→ Veria (loan)	6	(0)
2019–2021	Gandía	2	(1)
2021	Pego	3	(0)
2022	Beniopa	1	(0)
Total		328	(14)

International career
1998	Spain U16	10	(1)
1998	Spain U17	3	(2)
2002	Spain U21	3	(0)
2002–2004	Spain	14	(0)
- * Club domestic league appearances and goals

Raúl Bravo Sanfélix (born 14 April 1981) is a Spanish former professional footballer who played as a left-back or centre-back.

Having played in almost all the youth ranks at Real Madrid, he went on to have a six-year spell in the first team, where he almost always served as a backup; however, it was during that period that he reached the Spain national side, representing them at Euro 2004.

Bravo also spent several years in Greece, most notably with Olympiacos where he won six major titles, including three national championships.

== Club career ==
=== Real Madrid ===
Bravo was born in Gandia, Valencian Community. After playing in his early years with two local clubs, he joined Real Madrid's youth system at 16. He was subsequently part of the Junior A side, and played for them two more seasons before arriving at the C team in Tercera División, moving to Real Madrid Castilla in Segunda División B for 2001–02.

International call-ups of some players in the first team gave Bravo the chance for a La Liga debut against Athletic Bilbao at the Santiago Bernabéu, on 6 October 2001, and he played 70 minutes in a 2–0 win. He ended up training with them – under Vicente del Bosque's management – very regularly, which eventually led to his permanent stay from the 2002–03 campaign onwards.

In January 2003, Bravo started an unsuccessful six-month loan spell at Leeds United. During Euro 2004, in which he appeared for Spain, Mick McCarthy, whilst commentating for the BBC, remarked that he looked a different player to the one in his Elland Road stint; Roberto Carlos' presence, however, restricted his playing time in the Real main squad.

=== Olympiacos ===
With a chance to retain UEFA Champions League status, Bravo signed a four-year contract with Olympiacos F.C. in mid-July 2007, with the transfer fee estimated in the region of €2.3 million while the player received an annual salary of €1.3 million. After having appeared rarely due to injuries, he had a short return to Spain in the 2009 January transfer window, moving on loan to top-tier strugglers CD Numancia and having almost no impact in a relegation-ending campaign.

Bravo showed a much higher commitment than in the previous year with Olympiacos and, thanks to his performances in preseason, earned the starting left-back position over Didier Domi and Leonardo. He was released in May 2011 at the age of 30, after having contributed 18 matches to the conquest of the Super League Greece.

=== Later years ===
On 31 August 2011, Bravo returned to his country and Madrid, signing for Rayo Vallecano which had just promoted to the top division. In the following off-season, after having been rarely played in his only season, he joined Beerschot A.C. in Belgium for one year.

Aged 33, Bravo returned to the Greek top flight, moving to Veria FC. His contract expired on 30 June 2015 and, two months later, he agreed to a one-year deal with Aris Thessaloniki F.C. also in the country.

== International career ==
Bravo was capped for Spain on the under-16 level in 1997–98, when the national team won the Algarve Tournament. With the under-17s he played in the Nymburk International Tournament, scoring two goals in three matches.

Bravo's full debut was on 21 August 2002 against Hungary, in a friendly. Subsequently, he was a participant at UEFA Euro 2004, playing every minute in Spain's group stage exit campaign, against Portugal, Russia and eventual champions Greece (always as a stopper); he was not recalled since, receiving a total of 14 caps.

== Controversy ==
On 28 May 2019, Bravo was arrested on charges of belonging to a criminal organisation, involved in corruption and money laundering. The investigation regarded match fixing during the 2016–17 and 2017–18 campaigns. The following January, he was accused by Serbian tabloid newspaper Telegraf of hiring a contract killer to murder his former Olympiacos teammate Darko Kovačević, which he vehemently denied, commenting: "It's a crazy story, it's nonsense."

== Career statistics ==
=== Club ===
Appearances and goals by club, season and competition
Club	Season	League			Cup		Other		Total	
Club	Season	Division	Apps	Goals	Apps	Goals	Apps	Goals	Apps	Goals
Real Madrid	2001–02	La Liga	6	0	4	0	4 (Note: Appearances in UEFA Champions League)	0	14	0
Real Madrid	2002–03	La Liga	2	1	6	0	2	0	10	1
Real Madrid	2003–04	La Liga	32	1	11 (Note: Nine appearances in Copa del Rey, two appearances in Supercopa de España)	0	10	0	53	1
Real Madrid	2004–05	La Liga	14	0	4	0	3	0	21	0
Real Madrid	2005–06	La Liga	15	2	4	0	3	0	22	2
Real Madrid	2006–07	La Liga	8	0	4	0	1	0	13	0
Real Madrid	Total		77	4	33	0	23	0	133	4
Leeds United (loan)	2002–03	Premier League	5	0	1	0	—		6	0
Olympiacos	2007–08	Super League Greece	7	0			3	0	10	0
Olympiacos	2008–09	Super League Greece	6	0			—		6	0
Olympiacos	2009–10	Super League Greece	32	0			12	0	44	0
Olympiacos	2010–11	Super League Greece	18	0	2	0	2	0	22	0
Olympiacos	Total		63	0	2	0	17	0	82	0
Numancia (loan)	2008–09	La Liga	6	0	0	0	—		6	0
Rayo Vallecano	2011–12	La Liga	6	0	1	0	—		7	0
Beerschot	2012–13	Belgian Pro League	12	0	0	0	—		12	0
Córdoba	2013–14	Segunda División	29	0	0	0	2 (Note: Appearances in La Liga play-offs)	1	31	1
Veria	2014–15	Super League Greece	23	1	2	0	—		25	1
Career total			221	5	39	0	42	1	302	6

=== International ===
Spain
Year	Apps	Goals
2002	5	0
2003	3	0
2004	6	0
Total	14	0

== Honours ==
Real Madrid

- La Liga: 2002–03, 2006–07
- Supercopa de España: 2003
- UEFA Champions League: 2001–02
- UEFA Super Cup: 2002

Olympiacos

- Super League Greece: 2007–08, 2008–09, 2010–11
- Greek Football Cup: 2007–08
