= David Giraldo =

Colombian footballer

Personal information
- Date of birth: 1984 (age 41–42)
- Place of birth: Manizales, Colombia
- Height: 1.76 m (5 ft 9 in)
- Position: Striker

Team information
- Current team: Millonarios
- Number: 27

Senior career*
Years	Team	Apps	(Gls)
2003	Once Caldas		
- Alianza Petrolera
- Internacional
- Noroeste
2007–present	Millonarios		
- * Club domestic league appearances and goals as of 13 June 2007

David Giraldo (born 1984) is a Colombian footballer. He currently plays as a forward for Millonarios in the Copa Mustang.
