= Víctor Giraldo =

Colombian footballer (born 1985)

Victor Giraldo
Personal information
- Full name: Víctor Hugo Giraldo López
- Date of birth: September 30, 1985 (age 41)
- Place of birth: Itagüí, Colombia
- Height: 1.78 m (5 ft 10 in)
- Position: Right back

Team information
- Current team: Boyacá Chicó
- Number: 8

Senior career*
Years	Team	Apps	(Gls)
2003	Deportes Quindío		
2004–2006	Envigado		
2006–2009	La Equidad		
2010–2011	Atlético Nacional	62	(1)
2012	La Equidad	12	(0)
2012–2015	Deportivo Cali	72	(2)
2016	Atlético Huila	12	(0)
2016–2017	Deportes Tolima	29	(1)
2017–2019	Santa Fe	43	(0)
2019	Deportivo Pasto	8	(1)
2020–	Boyacá Chicó	7	(0)
- * Club domestic league appearances and goals as of 11:15, 27 October 2020 (UTC)

Víctor Hugo Giraldo López (born 30 August 1985), is retired Colombian football defender. He plays for last time in Boyacá Chicó in the Categoría Primera A.
