= Christos Patsatzoglou =

Greek footballer (born 1979)

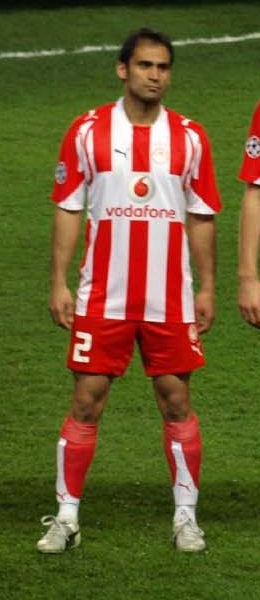
- Patsatzoglou with Olympiacos

Personal information
- Date of birth: 19 March 1979 (age 47)
- Place of birth: Athens, Greece
- Height: 1.83 m (6 ft 0 in)
- Positions: Right-back; defensive midfielder

Senior career*
| Years | Team | Apps | (Gls) |
| 1996–2000 | Skoda Xanthi | 87 | (8) |
| 2000–2009 | Olympiacos | 116 | (8) |
| 2009–2010 | Omonia | 6 | (0) |
| 2010–2011 | AEK Athens | 7 | (0) |
| 2011–2013 | PAS Giannina | 35 | (1) |
| 2013–2015 | Iraklis Psachna | 44 | (5) |
| 2015–2016 | AEK Chalkidos | 25 | (7) |
| 2016 | Chalkida | 4 | (0) |
| 2016–2017 | Proodeftiki | 15 | (0) |
| 2017 | Fostiras | 16 | (0) |
| 2018 | APO Aetos Korydallou | 7 | (0) |
| Total | | 361 | (29) |

International career
| 1999–2002 | Greece U21 | 20 | (3) |
| 2000–2010 | Greece | 45 | (1) |
- * Club domestic league appearances and goals

Christos Patsatzoglou (Greek: Χρήστος Πατσατζόγλου; born 19 March 1979) is a Greek former professional footballer who played as a right-back or defensive midfielder.

Patsatzoglou started his career in Skoda Xanthi before being transferred to Olympiacos where he won several national titles. He then moved to Omonia in Cyprus where he won the double. Patsatzoglou also had spells with AEK Athens and PAS Giannina. Patsatzoglou was capped on 45 occasions with Greece.

== Club career ==
=== Early career ===
Born and raised in Athens to a Romani family of the Greek Orthodox faith, Christos started playing football for his hometown's local youth team Agia Eleousa and earned a place in the squad of Greece U17. His talent was spotted by Skoda Xanthi's scouts and he was transferred to the club in 1996. He played for their first team for four years, from 1996–1997 to 1999–2000 where he won the Best Young Player award in his final season in Xanthi in 1999–2000.

=== Olympiacos ===
Christos was one of Greece's football players and was pursued to be signed by three of country's teams: Olympiacos, AEK Athens and Panathinaikos. However, he chose to sign with Olympiacos Piraeus. He was a consistent performer until he was injured in 2003, at a derby game between Olympiacos and AEK Athens. Just before he suffered the injury, Christos was a defender at the back and was skillful going forward.

He was being courted by Manchester United who Olympiacos declined a £6 million offer from them as Patsatzoglou after being watched by a scout who was sent to Greece from Old Trafford for a long time to watch his games was in Alex Ferguson's plans to rebuild his defensive lines but Olympiacos were not willing at all to give up their club's and country's star defender as he was so crucial to the success of Olympiacos and one of the pin-up boys of Greek football from the early 2000s and he remained at the Greek giants where down the track he copped a bad injury which kept him sidelined for a long while. He worked to recover from his injury for about two years, and made his comeback near the end of the 2004–05 season.

He stated that he was healthy again and that it was up to his coach, Trond Sollied to play him now. Sollied was not sure if Patsatzoglou could play again in such a competitive level, but he was willing to give him more chances in the 2005–06 season.

During the 2006–07 season, Patsatzoglou suffered another knee injury, unrelated to his previous one, at the away Champions League match against Roma. Upon his return, he played a handful of games.

In the 2007–08 season, Patsatzoglou scored the winning the goal in the UEFA Champions League match against Werder Bremen. The goal would lead to Olympiacos' first Champions League away win, finishing 1–3.

=== Omonia ===
On 1 June 2009, it was announced that Patsatzoglou would play for his ex-coach Takis Lemonis, this time though for Cypriot First Division club Omonia. Patsatzoglou agreed to a two-year deal earning €800,000. Patsatzoglou indicated he wants to leave in the summer transfer window and return to Greece. Being played out of position at centre-back has been cited as the reason for his desire to leave. Patsatzoglou only played six league matches due to his long-term injury.

=== AEK Athens ===
On 30 August 2010, Patsatzoglou agreed on terms with AEK Athens signing a one-year deal. Patsatzoglou was also rejoined with manager Dušan Bajević. Patsatzoglou was given the number 2. Patsatzoglou made his debut for AEK against Panserraikos coming on as a substitute. He is no longer with AEK Athens since January 2011.

=== PAS Giannina ===
In January 2011 Patsatzouglou signed for PAS Giannina a team in the second division hoping to get again in Super League Greece. In November 2012 Patsatzoglou, who was on the team for the game against OFI, disappeared making an appeal to the club due to a ten-day delay of a contract' dose. At that time, awaiting the final court decision for the appeal has been filed against PAS Giannina, Patsatzoglou was in England where he tried to open a new page in his career. The Greek international tested in Bolton Wanderers struggling to convince the team staff. He had also the best recommendations from Stelios Giannakopoulos, whom opinion always counts in Reebok Stadium. However, if this scenario did not proceed, Patsatzoglou was willing to exhaust every possibility for playing in England, at least until the end of the 2012–13 season.

=== Later career ===
In July 2013 Patsatzoglou signed a 2+1 years' contract for Greek Football League club Iraklis Psachna

In July 2015 Patsatzoglou signed a new contract with the local A' Division of Evia Island team AEK Chalkidos. On 1 July 2016 he signed with Chalkida F.C. where he played only four matches.

On 26 October 2016, he signed a contract with another Gamma Ethniki club Proodeftiki.

On 29 September 2017, he signed a contract with another Gamma Ethniki club Fostiras.

== International career ==
Patsatzoglou was selected for the 2002 UEFA European Under-21 Championship, although he had already made his full debut against Germany. He appeared once in a qualifying match for UEFA EURO 2004, but not in the final tournament itself, due to injury.

Patsatzoglou was part of the 23-man squad that represented Greece at Euro 2008. He also participated in the 2010 FIFA World Cup, making two appearances against South Korea and Argentina, both as a substitute.

== Career statistics ==
| # | Date | Venue | Opponent | Score | Result | Competition |
|---|---|---|---|---|---|---|
| 1. | 11 October 2006 | Zenica, Bosnia and Herzegovina | Bosnia and Herzegovina | 0–4 | Win | UEFA Euro 2008 qualifier |

== Honours ==
Olympiacos

- Alpha Ethniki/Super League Greece: 2000–01, 2001–02, 2002–03, 2004–05, 2005–06, 2006–07, 2007–08, 2008–09
- Greek Cup: 2004–05, 2005–06, 2007–08, 2008–09
- Greek Super Cup: 2007

Omonia

- Cypriot First Division: 2009–10
- LTV Super Cup: 2009–10

Individual

- Alpha Ethniki Best Young Player: 1999–2000
