= Georgios Katsikogiannis =

Greek footballer

Personal information
- Date of birth: 5 September 1988 (age 38)
- Place of birth: Athens, Greece
- Height: 1.84 m (6 ft 0 in)
- Position: Defensive midfielder

Youth career
- Olympiacos

Senior career*
Years	Team	Apps	(Gls)
2007–2011	Olympiacos	8	(0)
2008–2009	→ Levadiakos (loan)	18	(0)
2010–2011	→ OFI (loan)	23	(0)
2011–2012	Doxa Drama	6	(0)
2012–2017	Kallithea	123	(4)
2017–2018	Aittitos Spata	2	(0)
2019	Ionikos	0	(0)
2019–2020	Egaleo	11	(0)
2020–2021	Marko	0	(0)
2021–2022	Kyanos Asteras Vari		
2022–2024	Agia Eleousa	20	(0)
- * Club domestic league appearances and goals as of 18:22, 9 December 2018 (UTC) ‡ National team caps and goals as of 20:12, March 2008 (CET)

Georgios Katsikogiannis (Greek: Γεώργιος Κατσικογιάννης, born 5 September 1988) is a Greek former professional footballer who played as a defensive midfielder.

== Career ==
Katsikogiannis signed his first professional contract with Olympiacos at the start of the 2007/08 season. He made his debut with Olympiacos on 8 December 2007.

In September 2008, Olympiacos expanded his contract for 4 more years and loaned him to Levadiakos for 2 years. After only one-year spell with Levadiakos, Olympiacos terminated the loan and brought Katsikogiannis back to the squad for the 2009–2010 season.

As of February 2010, he is on loan to OFI until the end of the season.

== Honours ==
- Super League Greece: 2007–08
- Greek Cup: 2007–08
- Greek Super Cup: 2007
