= Moraci Sant'Anna =

Brazilian fitness coach (born 1951)

Personal information
- Full name: Moraci Vasconcelos Sant'Anna
- Date of birth: 6 July 1951 (age 75)
- Place of birth: Santana de Parnaíba, Brazil

Managerial career
- Years: Team
- 1974–1980: Palmeiras
- 1980–1982: Brazil
- 1983–1985: Al-Ahli
- 1985–1986: Brazil
- 1987–1990: United Arab Emirates
- 1990–1994: São Paulo
- 1994: Brazil
- 1994–1995: Valencia
- 1995–1996: Fenerbahçe
- 1996: São Paulo
- 1996–1998: Saudi Arabia
- 1999–2000: Fluminense
- 2001: Guarani
- 2002–2004: Corinthians
- 2004–2006: Brazil
- 2006: Palmeiras
- 2007–2008: Fenerbahçe
- 2008: Atlético Paranaense
- 2009–2010: Olympiacos
- 2011: Grêmio Barueri (football director)
- 2011–2012: Iraq
- 2013: Atlético Paranaense
- 2014: Botafogo
- 2014: Baniyas Club
- 2015–2016: FC Goa
- 2018–2019: Red Bull Brasil
- 2019–2020: Red Bull Bragantino
- 2022–2023: Inter de Limeira (football director)

Moraci Sant'Anna (born 6 July 1951) is a Brazilian professional fitness coach.

== Career ==
Moraci tried to be a professional soccer player, and became part of São Paulo FC youth sector, but gave up before moving up to the main team. Started his career as fitness coach at the age of 23 at Palmeiras, and managed to work on six different editions of FIFA World Cup: 1982, 1986, 1990, 1994, 1998 and 2006, since he had an excellent relationship with coaches Telê Santana and Carlos Alberto Parreira. Alongside Telê, he participated in the main achievements of São Paulo FC in the early 1990s. With Parreira, he worked in the UAE and Saudi Arabia national teams and in European football at Valencia and Fenerbahçe. also worked with Zico on most of his projects.

On 2018, Moraci joined the Red Bull project taking charge of the technical preparation of Red Bull Brasil, and later, of Red Bull Bragantino. At the end of 2022, he signed with Inter de Limeira, to be director of football.

== Honours ==
Brazil

- FIFA World Cup: 1994
- Copa America: 2004
- FIFA Confederations Cup: 2005

Saudi Arabia

- AFC Asian Cup: 1996

São Paulo

- Campeonato Brasileiro: 1991
- Campeonato Paulista: 1991, 1992
- Copa Libertadores 1992, 1993
- Intercontinental Cup: 1992, 1993
- Recopa Sudamericana: 1993, 1994
- Supercopa Libertadores: 1993

Corinthians

- Torneio Rio-São Paulo: 2002
- Copa do Brasil: 2002
- Campeonato Paulista: 2003

Palmeiras

- Campeonato Paulista: 1974, 1976

Fluminense

- Campeonato Brasileiro Série C: 1999

Al-Ahli

- King Cup: 1983
- Saudi Pro League: 1983–84
- Gulf Club Champions Cup: 1985

Fenerbahçe

- Süper Lig: 1995–96, 2006–07
- Turkish Super Cup: 2007
