= Didier Domi =

French footballer and coach (born 1978)

Personal information
- Full name: Didier Arsène Marcel Domi
- Date of birth: 2 May 1978 (age 48)
- Place of birth: Sarcelles, Val d'Oise, France
- Height: 1.79 m (5 ft 10 in)
- Position: Left back

Team information
- Current team: Paris Saint-Germain (academy technical advisor)

Youth career
- 1994–1996: Paris Saint-Germain

Senior career*
| Years | Team | Apps | (Gls) |
| 1996–1998 | Paris Saint-Germain | 48 | (0) |
| 1998–2001 | Newcastle United | 70 | (4) |
| 2001–2004 | Paris Saint-Germain | 31 | (0) |
| 2003–2004 | → Leeds United (loan) | 17 | (0) |
| 2004–2006 | Espanyol | 42 | (0) |
| 2006–2010 | Olympiacos | 61 | (0) |
| 2011 | New England Revolution | 9 | (0) |
| Total | | 278 | (4) |

International career
| 1992 | France U15 | | |
| 1992–1993 | France U16 | 3 | (0) |
| 1993–1994 | France U17 | 7 | (0) |
| 1996 | France U18 | | |
| 1997 | France U21 | 19 | (0) |
- * Club domestic league appearances and goals

Didier Arsène Marcel Domi (born 2 May 1978) is a French football coach, former professional footballer and pundit who is technical advisor to the Paris Saint-Germain Academy in Qatar.

As a player, he was a left-back who had two spells with Paris Saint-Germain where he made 79 appearances in Ligue 1. He also played in the Premier League for Newcastle United and Leeds United and in La Liga for Espanyol. He later won multiple trophies in Greece with Olympiacos before retiring with Major League Soccer side New England Revolution.

== Early life ==
Domi was born in Sarcelles, Val d'Oise, France. He is a convert to Islam.

== Club career ==
=== Paris Saint-Germain ===
Domi joined Paris Saint-Germain as a trainee in 1994, and made his debut in January 1996. (Note: Didier Domi – French league stats at LFP – also available in French (archived)) The following season, having only appeared once in their UEFA Cup Winners' Cup defence, he was brought in to start the first leg of the semi-final against Liverpool as PSG won 3–0, and also played 90 minutes in the final loss to Barcelona.

Having appeared in the UEFA Super Cup against Juventus the same season, the next campaign he took part in the UEFA Champions League and helped PSG win both the Coupe de France and Coupe de la Ligue.

=== Newcastle United ===
Domi's performances earned a £4 million move to Newcastle United in January 1999. Whilst at Newcastle, he played in the 1999 FA Cup final. He scored three league goals, all coming in the 1999–2000 against Wimbledon, Coventry and rivals Sunderland.

After a good start to his career at Newcastle, he fell out of favour and on 19 January 2001, was sold back to PSG for £3 million.

=== Return to Paris and loan to Leeds United ===
Injury limited Domi's appearances at PSG and in 2003–04 he was loaned to Leeds United but only made a sporadic impact as they were relegated from the Premier League.

=== Espanyol and Olympiacos ===
PSG let Domi join Espanyol in summer 2004 and late in 2005–06 he finally held down a regular place, helping them to the Copa del Rey final, though he did not appear in the 4–1 win against Real Zaragoza. At the end of that season he moved on a free transfer to Olympiacos, signing a three-year deal.

=== New England Revolution ===
On 11 January 2011, Domi signed a one-year contract with the New England Revolution, and made his MLS debut on 26 March 2011 in a 2–1 win over D.C. United. The Revolution released Domi on 17 July 2011.

== International career ==
Domi is a former French youth and Under-21 international.

== After retirement ==
Domi currently works for beIN Sports in the Middle East.

== Honours ==
Paris Saint-Germain

- Coupe de France: 1997–98
- Coupe de la Ligue: 1997–98
- Trophée des Champions: 1998
- UEFA Intertoto Cup: 2001

Newcastle United

- FA Cup runner-up: 1998–99

Olympiacos

- Super League Greece: 2006–07, 2007–08, 2008–09
- Greek Cup: 2007–08, 2008–09
- Greek Super Cup: 2007
