= Anastasios Pantos =

Greek footballer (born 1976)

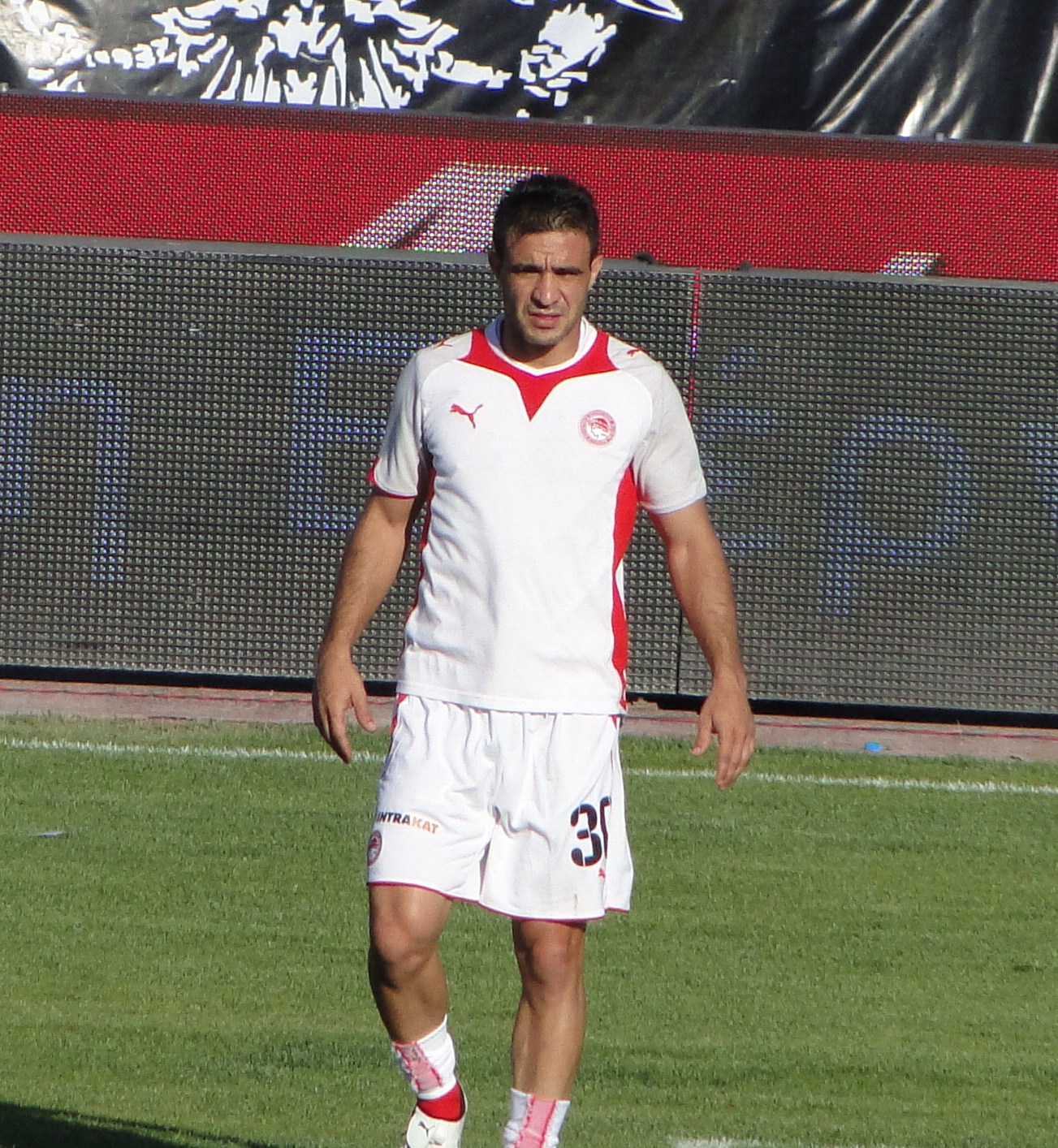

Personal information
- Full name: Anastasios Pantos
- Date of birth: 5 May 1976 (age 50)
- Place of birth: Korydallos, Greece
- Height: 1.70 m (5 ft 7 in)
- Positions: Right back; left back

Senior career*
Years	Team	Apps	(Gls)
1998–2003	Proodeftiki	95	(6)
2003–2010	Olympiacos	132	(0)
2010–2013	PAS Giannina	88	(0)
Total		297	(6)
- * Club domestic league appearances and goals as of 4 February 2011

Anastasios "Tasos" Pantos (Greek: Αναστάσιος "Τάσος" Πάντος; born 5 May 1976) is a retired Greek footballer. He primarily played the right back position, but he also operated as a left back. Over the years, Pantos has become famous for his speed, steady physical condition his exceptional work ethic. He played for Olympiacos for 7 years (2003–2010), winning 5 Greek Championships, 4 Greek Cups and a Greek Super Cup.

== Club career ==
=== Proodeftiki ===
Born in 1976, he established himself in the Proodeftiki team in 1998/99. The club's star dipped as they were relegated the following season, yet Pantos remained at the Korrydallos stadium and was an influential figure as they won promotion back to the Alpha Ethniki two years later. He scored his first top-flight goal for Proodeftiki against AEK Athens in December 2002. After playing regularly for Proodeftiki in 2002/03, he announced in April that he would be leaving the club at the end of the season after agreeing, along with team-mates Thymios Kouloucheris and Alekos Tatsis, to join Olympiacos.

=== Olympiacos ===
He signed a two-year contract with an option for a similar extension. Pantos adapted well in Piraeus, starting 23 league matches and also played five UEFA Champions League games.

He began 2004–05 at right-back due to Dimitrios Mavrogenidis's knee injury, then switched to the left flank when Stylianos Venetidis was ruled out. Played in 26 league matches as Olympiacos clinched the double, but received their only red cards both in the domestic championship – a 2–0 victory at Panionios – and UEFA Champions League, the 1–0 win against Liverpool F.C. The next season he took part in the majority of their double-winning games but received another UEFA Champions League red card against Rosenborg BK.

=== PAS Giannina ===
On 9 July 2010 Pantos signed a two-year contract for PAS Giannina. His hardworking style of play was appreciated by the PAS Giannina supporters.

== Honours ==
Olympiacos

- Super League Greece: 2004–05, 2005–06, 2006–07, 2007–08, 2008–09
- Greek Cup: 2004–05, 2005–06, 2007–08, 2008–09
- Greek Super Cup: 2007

PAS Giannina

  - Football League: 2010–11
