= Leonidas Panagopoulos =

Greek former footballer

Personal information
- Date of birth: 3 January 1987 (age 39)
- Place of birth: Zacharo, Greece
- Height: 1.87 m (6 ft 1 1/2 in)
- Position: Goalkeeper

Youth career
- –2006: Olympiacos

Senior career*
Years	Team	Apps	(Gls)
2006–2010	Olympiacos	0	(0)
2010–2012	Panionios	1	(0)
2012–2013	Vyzas	13	(0)
2013	Turnu Severin	12	(0)
2013–2014	Săgeata Năvodari	28	(0)
2014–2015	Universitatea Cluj	9	(0)
2015–2016	Ermis	29	(0)
2017	Ionikos	12	(0)
2017–2018	Rodos	19	(0)
2018–2019	Agrotikos Asteras	20	(0)
2019–2020	Aspropyrgos	14	(0)
2021	Aittitos Spata	8	(0)
2021–2022	AO Melissia		
Total		165	

International career
2006–2007	Greece U21	6	(0)
- * Club domestic league appearances and goals as of 21:02, 14 November 2015 (UTC)

Leonidas Panagopoulos (Greek: Λεωνίδας Παναγόπουλος, born 3 January 1987) is a Greek former footballer who played as a goalkeeper.
