= Andreas Vasilogiannis =

Greek footballer (born 1991)

Personal information
- Date of birth: 21 February 1991 (age 35)
- Place of birth: Patra, Greece
- Height: 1.82 m (6 ft 0 in)
- Position: Right winger

Team information
- Current team: Panachaiki
- Number: 7

Youth career
- –2007: Dyni Achaia
- 2007–2010: Olympiacos

Senior career*
| Years | Team | Apps | (Gls) |
| 2010–2013 | Olympiacos | 0 | (0) |
| 2010–2011 | → Ethnikos Piraeus (loan) | 22 | (3) |
| 2011 | → Apollon Limassol (loan) | 0 | (0) |
| 2012 | → Glyfada (loan) | 14 | (2) |
| 2012–2013 | → Kerkyra (loan) | 10 | (0) |
| 2013–2014 | AO Chania | 33 | (2) |
| 2014–2015 | Lamia | 17 | (3) |
| 2015–2016 | Ermis Aradippou | 32 | (4) |
| 2016–2017 | Lamia | 31 | (12) |
| 2017–2019 | Ümraniyespor | 66 | (8) |
| 2019–2021 | Lamia | 36 | (0) |
| 2021–2022 | Chania | 48 | (15) |
| 2022–2023 | Kalamata | 26 | (1) |
| 2023–2026 | Athens Kallithea | 65 | (5) |
| 2026– | Panachaiki | 0 | (0) |

International career^{‡}
| 2011–2012 | Greece U21 | 6 | (1) |
- * Club domestic league appearances and goals as of 21 April 2026 ‡ National team caps and goals as of 17:19, 4 January 2013 (UTC)

Andreas Vasilogiannis (Greek: Ανδρέας Βασιλόγιαννης; born 21 February 1991) is a Greek professional footballer who plays as a right midfielder for Super League 2 club Athens Kallithea.

== Club career ==
=== Early career ===
Born in Patras, Greece, Vasilogiannis started his career at local club Dyni Achaia, from where he was transferred to the youth academies of Olympiacos in May 2007. He made his official debut with the first team at the 2007 Greek Super Cup, coming as a substitute for Leonel Núñez in the 77th minute.

=== Loan spells ===
==== Ethnikos Piraeus ====
In August 2010, Vasilogiannis moved to Football League side Ethnikos Piraeus on a season-long loan. He made 22 appearances in the 2010–11 Football League, scoring 3 goals.

==== Apollon Limassol and Glyfada ====
On 31 August 2011, Vasilogiannis was loaned out to Cypriot First Division side Apollon Limassol for a year. However, he never featured in the plans of his manager, Mihai Stoichiță, and he was released in late December of the same year, having failed to make a single first team appearance for the club.

In January 2012, just a few weeks after his return to Olympiacos, Football League 2 side Glyfada offered to sign him on loan until the end of the season, an offer which Olympiacos accepted as the player would not get any playing time there.

==== Kerkyra ====
On 5 July 2012, Vasilogiannis moved to Kerkyra in the Super League for a one-year loan. He made his Super League debut on 16 September 2012, in a home match against Skoda Xanthi.

=== Chania, Lamia, Ermis ===
Vasilogiannis would leave Olympiacos in summer 2013 and went on to be a standout performer in three consecutive seasons with Chania, Lamia, and Cypriot First Division club Ermis Aradippou.

=== Second spell in Lamia ===
In June 2016, Vasilogiannis returned to Lamia and helped the club achieve their first-ever promotion to Super League 1 with a team-leading 12 goals and 10 assists in 31 matches, earning him league MVP honors in the 2016/17 season.

=== Ümraniyespor ===
On the heels of his star turn at Lamia, the ambitious Istanbul-based club Ümraniyespor would swoop for Vasilogiannis in a quest for their own first-ever promotion to the Turkish Süper Lig. Vasilogiannis made 66 appearances with eight goals and eight assists for the club over the next two seasons, reaching as far as the semifinals of the promotion playoffs during his tenure but ultimately falling short.

=== Third spell in Lamia ===
In summer 2019, Vasilogiannis would leave Turkey and return to Greece for his third spell at Lamia, this time with the club in Super League 1. He would make 29 appearances (15 starts) in the 2019/20 Super League 1 season, before departing midway through the following season for Chania.

=== Chania ===
Joining Chania in middle of the 2019/20 Super League 1 season, Vasilogiannis would score 15 goals with seven assists in 53 appearances over the next year and a half for the Cretan club.

=== Athens Kallithea FC ===
In July 2023, Vasilogiannis joined Athens Kallithea FC.

=== Panachaiki FC ===
In July 2026, Vasilogiannis joined Panachaiki

== International career ==
Between 2011 and 2012, Vasilogiannis made six appearances for the Greece Under-21 national team.
