= Geraldo (footballer, born 1994) =

Brazilian footballer

Personal information
- Full name: Geraldo Rocha Pereira
- Date of birth: 22 March 1994 (age 32)
- Place of birth: Manaus, Amazonas, Brazil
- Position: Midfielder

Youth career
- Rio Negro
- Recanto da Criança
- Nacional
- Fast Clube
- Tarumã
- Rio Negro
- Maranhão
- JV Lideral Futebol Clube

Senior career*
Years	Team	Apps	(Gls)
2013	Náutico	3	(1)
- Rio Negro
- Fast Clube
2017–	Tarumã	0	(0)
- * Club domestic league appearances and goals as of 16 March 2017 (UTC)

Geraldo Rocha Pereira (born 16 March 1994), commonly known as Geraldo, is a Brazilian professional footballer who plays for Tarumã in the second division of the Campeonato Amazonense. He previously played for Náutico in the Campeonato Pernambucano.

Born in Manaus, Geraldo began playing futsal for Rio Negro at the age of seven.
