= 2007 Greek Super Cup =

Olympiacos	AEL
1	0
- Date: 31 October 2007
- Venue: Karaiskakis Stadium, Piraeus
- Man of the Match: Kostas Mitroglou (Olympiacos)
- Referee: Kostas Kapitanis (Cyprus)
- Attendance: 7,141
- Weather: Mostly Cloudy; 16 °C (61 °F); 82% humidity

The 2007 Greek Super Cup was the 9th edition of the Greek Super Cup, an association football match contested by the winners of the previous season's Super League Greece and Greek Cup competitions. The match took place on 31 October 2007 at Karaiskakis Stadium. The contesting teams were the 2006–07 Super League Greece champions, Olympiacos and the 2006–07 Greek Cup winners, AEL. It was the first Greek Super Cup to be held after 11 years, as in the period that mediated the general interest towards the institution waned, while Olympiacos and Panathinaikos won the double in many occasions. That was eventually the last time that the Greek Super Cup was held. Olympiacos won the match 1–0.

== Venue ==
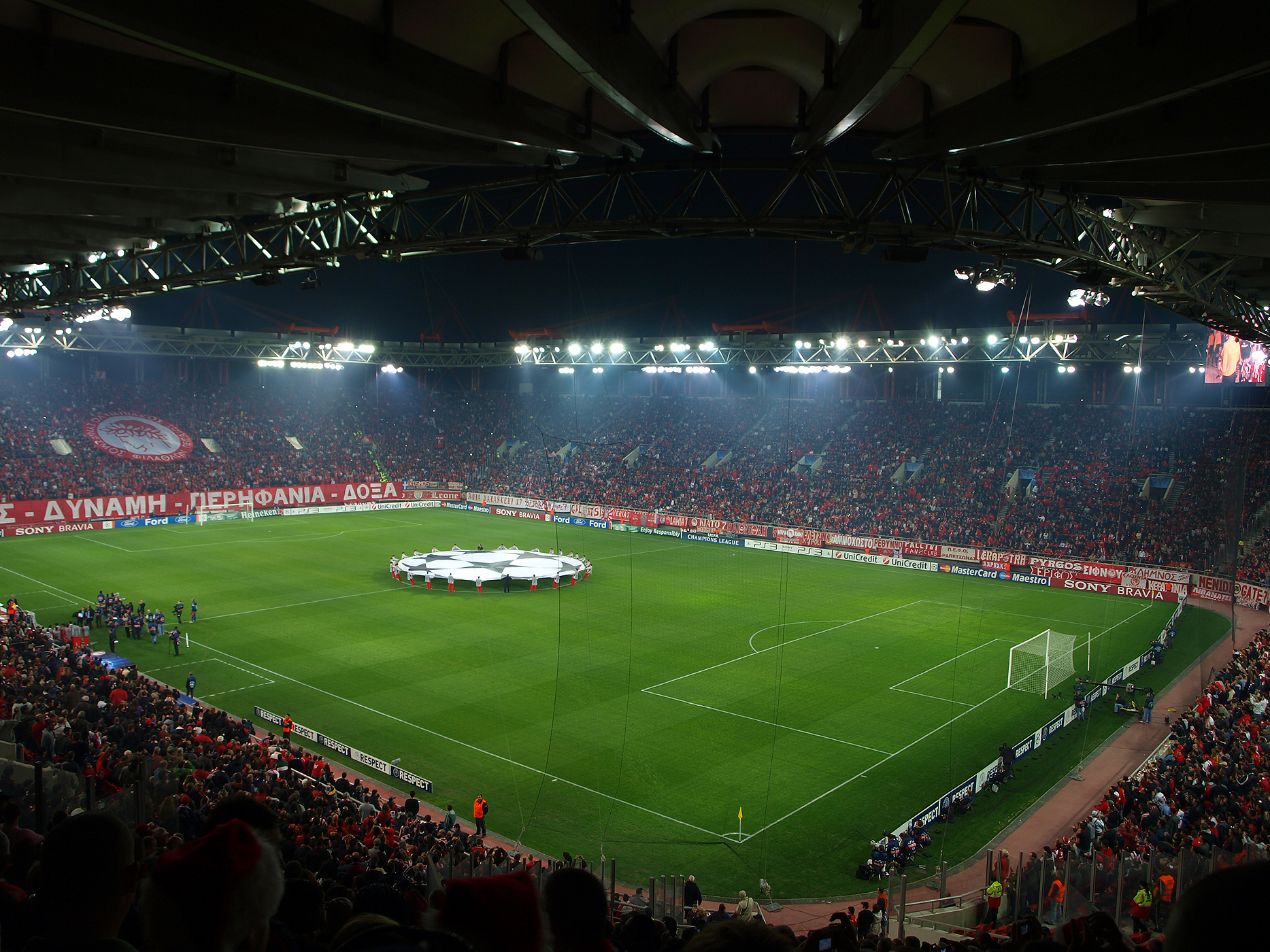
Karaiskakis Stadium.

This was the third Greek Super Cup held at Karaiskakis Stadium, after 1980 and 1996.

Karaiskakis Stadium was built in 1895 and renovated once in 1964. The stadium is used as a venue for Olympiacos and Ethnikos Piraeus and was used for Greece in various occasions. Its current capacity is 42,000 and hosted a European Cup Winners' Cup final in 1971 and will host the fist leg of the 1971 Intercontinental Cup final.

== Background ==
Olympiacos participated in the Greek Super Cup three times, winning all of them. The last time that they had played in the Super Cup was in 1992, where they had won AEK Athens by 3–1.

AEL participated in the Greek Super Cup two times, winning none of them. The last time that they had played in the Super Cup was in 1988, where they lost to Panathinaikos by 3–1.

The two teams had never met each other in the Super Cup.

== Match ==
=== Details ===
31 October 2007
20:00 EET (UTC+2)

Olympiacos	1–0	AEL
Mitroglou 39'	Report

Karaiskakis Stadium, Piraeus
Attendance: 7,141
Referee: Kostas Kapitanis (Cyprus)

Olympiacos	AEL

GK	87	(Greece) Michalis Sifakis
RB	30	(Greece) Anastasios Pantos (c)
CB	35	(Greece) Vasilis Torosidis
CB	14	(Poland) Michał Żewłakow
LB	8	(Argentina) Rodrigo Archubi
DM	24	(Greece) Georgios Katsikogiannis	(yellow card) 31'
CM	19	(Greece) Konstantinos Mendrinos
CM	31	(Greece) Aristidis Soiledis		(substituted off) 77'
LM	10	(Argentina) Leonel Núñez		(substituted off) 76'
CF	22	(Greece) Kostas Mitroglou
CF	23	(Cyprus) Michalis Konstantinou
Substitutes:
MF	7	(Argentina) Luciano Galletti		(substituted on) 77'
MF	21	(Greece) Andreas Vasilogiannis		(substituted on) 76'
Manager:
(Greece) Takis Lemonis

GK	1	(Greece) Fotis Kipouros
RB	31	(Greece) Michalis Boukouvalas
CB	24	(Greece) Anastasios Venetis
CB	20	(Germany) Marco Förster (c)
LB	77	(Greece) Panagiotis Katsiaros
DM	42	(Argentina) Matías Iglesias		(substituted off) 46'
CM	22	(Greece) Alexandros Vergonis		(substituted off) 46'
CM	33	(Greece) Panagiotis Bachramis	(yellow card) 33'	(substituted off) 57'
RW	13	(Greece) Andreas Lampropoulos
LW	99	(Slovakia) Jozef Kožlej
CF	9	(Argentina) Facundo Parra
Substitutes:
MF	5	(Greece) Ilias Kyriakidis	(yellow card) 87'	(substituted on) 46'
MF	11	(Cyprus) Nektarios Alexandrou		(substituted on) 46'
FW	21	(Argentina) Toni Muñoz		(substituted on) 57'
Manager:
(Greece) Georgios Donis

Man of the Match:
(Greece) Kostas Mitroglou (Olympiacos)

Assistant referees:
Frixos Petrou (Cyprus)
Athinodoros Ioannou (Cyprus)
Fourth official:
Konstantinos Papastamatis (Athens)

Match rules

- 90 minutes
- 30 minutes of extra time if necessary
- Penalty shootout if scores still level
- Seven named substitutes
- Maximum of three substitutions
