= Leonardo Jesus =

Brazilian footballer (born 1985)

Personal information
- Full name: Leonardo de Jesus Geraldo
- Date of birth: 4 August 1985 (age 41)
- Place of birth: Carapicuíba, Brazil
- Height: 1.72 m (5 ft 8 in)
- Position: Left back

Youth career
- Portuguesa

Senior career*
Years	Team	Apps	(Gls)
2004–2007	Portuguesa	97	(4)
2008–2011	Olympiacos	41	(2)
2010–2011	→ Internacional (loan)	3	(0)
2011–2012	PAOK	1	(0)
2012–2013	Grêmio Barueri	6	(0)
2013	Atlético Goianiense	6	(0)
2013–2014	Vila Nova	5	(1)
2014–2016	Mogi Mirim	31	(0)
2016–2018	Bangu Atlético Clube	0	(0)
2023–2024	Agios Dimitrios		
2024–2025	AO Koropiou	8	(0)

International career
2007	Brazil U23	1	(0)
- * Club domestic league appearances and goals as of 03:21, 2 August 2015 (UTC)

Leonardo de Jesus Geraldo (born 4 August 1985), known as Leonardo Jesus or just Léo, is a Brazilian footballer, usually playing as a wing-back.

== Career ==
=== Portuguesa ===
Born in São Paulo state, Leonardo Jesus started his career with Portuguesa de Desportos. After made his national league debut at 2004 Campeonato Brasileiro Série B, he signed a new 3 1/2-year contract with club in August 2005. In 2005 Campeonato Brasileiro Série B, he was the regular start of the team, played 18 out of 21 games and 11 out of 12 games in champion playoffs. He missed twice due to suspension (that season he was cautioned 11 times and every 3 cautions suspend once) and rested in round 21. That season Lusa finished as the 4th. In 2006 Campeonato Brasileiro Série B, he played 23 league matches and most notably missed 9 matches from round 11 to 19 and the last 4 matches of the league. He was cautioned 3 times that season but no suspension. He enjoyed his best season in 2007, winning Campeonato Paulista Série A2, played 35 times in 2007 Campeonato Brasileiro Série B, scored 2 goals and just suspended once. That season he was cautioned 5 times in Serie B. Portuguesa finished as the third and promoted to 2008 Campeonato Brasileiro Série A. He also earned an international cap coached by Dunga on 9 December.

He did not play in 2008 Campeonato Paulista as he was busy in transfer talks.

=== Olympiacos ===
Leonardo Jesus was signed by Olympiacos in January 2008. for a reported €2 million paid to Lusa to buy its 65% economic rights of the player. The rest was owned by a third-party owner José Riva. In July 2011 his contract was terminated.

=== Internacional ===
In June 2010, he was loaned back to Brazil in 1-year deal. However, he suffered from injury and did not play any match for the first team in the 2011 season.

=== PAOK ===
On 9 September 2011 Leonardo Jesus signed one-year contract with PAOK. The club keeps the right to break this contract in January 2012, if the player won't meet its expectations.

=== International career ===
The left-back was set to be in Brazil's 2008 Olympic football squad and gained his first national cap in a pre-olympic friendly, against Brazil League Best XI. Brazil Olympic eventually lost 0–3. He was then dropped from the preliminary squad.

== Career statistics ==
Club performance			League		Cup		League Cup		Continental		Total	
Season	Club	League	Apps	Goals	Apps	Goals	Apps	Goals	Apps	Goals	Apps	Goals
Brazil			League		Copa do Brasil		League Cup		South America		Total	
2004	Portuguesa	Série B	10	0							?	?^{1}
2005	Portuguesa	Série B	18+11	2+0							?	?^{1}
2006	Portuguesa	Série B	23	0							?	?^{1}
2007	Portuguesa	Série B	35	2	1	0	22	3			58	5
Greece			League		Greek Cup		League Cup		Europe		Total	
2007–08	Olympiacos	Super League Greece	11	0	?	?			2	0	?	?
2008–09	Olympiacos	Super League Greece	8	0	?	?			3	0	?	?
2009–10	Olympiacos	Super League Greece	19	2	?	?			8	2	?	?^{2}
Brazil			League		Copa do Brasil		League Cup		South America		Total	
2010	Internacional	Série A	3	0					Nil^{3}		3	0
2011	Internacional	Série A	0	0			0	0	Nil^{3}		0	0
Total	Brazil		100	4	1	0	?	?	0	0	?	?^{1}
Total	Greece		38	2	?	?			13	2	?	?^{2}
Career total			138	6	?	?	13	2	?	?	?	?^{4}

- Note:

State Leagues were marked as league cup
^{1} No stats. available for 2004 to 2006 Campeonato Paulista Série A1 and Campeonato Paulista Série A2.
^{2} 3 games in 2010 qualification playoffs for European competitions
^{3} Not registered in 2010 and 2011 Copa Libertadores
^{4} See note 1 and 2

== Honours ==
- Super League Greece: 2007–08, 2008–09
- Greek Cup: 2007–08, 2008–09
- Campeonato Paulista Série A2: 2007
