= 2009–10 PAS Giannina F.C. season =

PAS Giannina
2009–10 season
- Chairman: Giorgos Christovasilis
- Manager: Georgios Paraschos (until 6 December 2009); Thimios Georgoulis (caretaker, 7 December 2009 to 14 January 2010); Nikos Anastopoulos (from 14 January 2010)
- Stadium: Zosimades Stadium, Ioannina
- Super League: 15th
- Greek Cup: Semi-finals eliminated by Panathinaikos
- Top goalscorer: League: Saitiotis; 6 goals All: Saitiotis; 6 goals
- Highest home attendance: 7500; Olympiacos
- Lowest home attendance: 0; AEL
- Average home league attendance: 4410

The 2009–10 season is PAS Giannina F.C.'s 16th competitive season in the top flight of Greek football, 1st season in the Superleague Greece, and 44th year in existence as a football club. They also compete in the Greek Cup.

== Players ==
No.	Name	Nationality	Position(s)	Place of birth	Date of birth	Signed from	Notes
Goalkeepers
1	Nikos Zafeiropoulos	(Greece)	GK	Patras, Greece	8 January 1974	(Greece) Levadiakos	
30	Georgios Sikalias	(Greece)	GK	Athens, Greece	25 March 1986	(Greece) Ethnikos Piraeus	
33	Dimitris Eleftheropoulos (VC2)	(Greece)	GK	Piraeus, Greece	7 August 1976	(Italy) Siena	
	Panagiotis Lolas	(Greece)	GK		26 June 1992	(Greece) PAS Giannina U21	
Defenders
2	Georgios Dasios (C)	(Greece)	RB	Ioannina, Greece	12 May 1983	-	
3	Giannis Stathis	(Greece)	RB	Athens, Greece	20 May 1987	(Greece) Panathinaikos	
4	Georgios Kousas (VC)	(Greece)	CB	Thessaloniki, Greece	12 August 1982	(Greece) Apollon Kalamarias	
5	Ilias Kotsios (VC3)	(Greece)	CB	Larissa, Greece	25 April 1977	(Greece) AEL	
6	Petros Kanakoudis	(Greece)	LB	Thessaloniki, Greece	16 April 1984	(Greece) Asteras Tripolis	
19	Ivica Majstorović	(Croatia) (Germany)	CB	Munich, West Germany	20 September 1981	(Greece) Panionios	
27	Vanderson Scardovelli	(Brazil) (Italy)	LB	Dracena, Brazil	27 September 1984	(Italy) Treviso	
32	Pavlos Vartziotis	(Greece)	CB	Ioannina, Greece	27 January 1981	(Greece) Kerkyra	
77	Lefteris Vatsis	(Greece)	CB	Andravida, Greece	11 January 1992	(Greece) AE Achaiki	
	Kostas Louboutis	(Greece)	LB	Thessaloniki, Greece	10 June 1979	(Greece) Levadiakos	
Midfielders
7	Ilias Michalopoulos	(Greece)	ML	Athens, Greece	15 October 1985	(Greece) Atromitos U21	
8	Kostas Mendrinos	(Greece)	CM	Piraeus, Greece	28 May 1985	(Greece) Olympiacos	
14	Kostas Pappas	(Greece)	CM	Ioannina, Greece	30 November 1991	(Greece) PAS Giannina U21	
16	Paraskevas Andralas	(Greece)	DM / CB	Piraeus, Greece	2 December 1978	(Greece) Levadiakos	
17	Kostantinos Kaznaferis	(Greece)	RW	Arta, Greece	22 June 1987	(Greece) Pyrsos Grevena	
18	Esteban Buján	(Argentina)	DM	Capital Federal, Argentina	13 July 1979	(Argentina) CA Banfield	
21	Lambros Vangelis	(Greece)	CM	Neochori, Greece	10 February 1982	(Greece) PAOK	
28	Nicolás Schenone	(Uruguay)	DM	Montevideo, Uruguay	24 April 1986	(Uruguay) Cerro Largo	
66	Vasilios Rovas	(Greece)	DM	Karditsa, Greece	6 January 1984	(Greece) Aris Thessaloniki	Loan
81	Mirnes Šišić	(Slovenia)	RW	Celje, SFR Yugoslavia	8 August 1981	Free	
82	Salim Arrache	(Algeria)	LW	Marseille, France	14 July 1982	(France) Bastia	
-	Panagiotis Christovasilis	(Greece)	CM		14 April 1987	-	
Forwards
9	Giorgos Saitiotis	(Greece)	FW	Chalkidiki, Greece	25 July 1981	(Greece) Niki Volos	
11	Evangelos Kontogoulidis	(Greece)	ST	Proastio, Kozani, Greece	13 July 1981	(Greece) Kozani	
20	Ibrahima Bakayoko	(Ivory Coast)	FW	Séguéla, Ivory Coast	31 December 1976	(Greece) PAOK	
22	Christos Tzanis	(Greece)	FW	Parapotamos, Greece	22 April 1985	(Greece) Anagennisi Arta	
23	Patrick Dimbala	(Democratic Republic of the Congo) (Belgium)	FW	Kinshasa, Zaire	20 September 1982	(Greece) Levadiakos	
Left during Winter Transfer Window
	Spyros Gogolos	(Greece)	CB	Kerkyra, Greece	11 August 1978	(Greece) Aris Thessaloniki	
13	Sotiris Balafas	(Greece)	DM	Arta, Greece	19 August 1986	(Greece) PAOK	Loan
88	Nikolaos Georgiadis	(Greece)	RB	Toronto, Canada	23 March 1983	(Greece) Kozani	
	Evripidis Giakos	(Greece)	CM / CF	Ioannina, Greece	9 April 1991	(Greece) PAS Giannina U21	
25	Alexios Michail	(Greece)	CB	Ioannina, Greece	18 August 1986	(Greece) Lamia	
	Christos Koutsospyros	(Greece)	FW	Agrinio, Greece	14 October 1981	(Greece) Panachaiki	
15	Tomas De Vincenti	(Argentina)	CM	Buenos Aires, Argentina	9 February 1989	(Argentina) Excursionistas	
12	Jean Marie Sylla	(Guinea)	ML	Conakry, Guinea	22 April 1983	(Greece) Apollon Kalamarias	
10	Dimitris Sialmas	(Greece)	FW	Athens, Greece	19 June 1986	(Greece) Ethnikos Piraeus	
	Giorgos Kolios	(Greece)	DF		28 April 1990	(Greece) PAS Giannina U21	
91	Giorgos Margaritis	(Greece)	LB	Thessaloniki, Greece	20 June 1991	(Greece) Agrotikos Asteras	

=== International players ===
- (Ivory Coast) Ibrahima Bakayoko (men's)
- (Greece) Dimitris Eleftheropoulos (men's)
- (Greece) Kostas Louboutis (men's)
- (Slovenia) Mirnes Šišić (men's)
- (Algeria) Salim Arrache (men's)
- (Greece) Georgios Sikalias (U21)

- (Greece) Lambros Vangelis (U21)
- (Greece) Georgios Kousas (U21)
- (Greece) Petros Kanakoudis (U21)
- (Greece) Kostas Mendrinos (U21)
- (Greece) Sotiris Balafas (U21)
- (Belgium) Patrick Dimbala (U21)

=== Foreign players ===
EU Nationals
- (Slovenia) Mirnes Šišić

EU Nationals (Dual Citizenship)
- (Brazil) (Italy) (Europe) Vanderson Scardovelli
- (Croatia) (Germany) (Europe) Ivica Majstorović
- (Democratic Republic of the Congo) (Belgium) (Europe) Patrick Dimbala

Non-EU Nationals
- (Argentina) Esteban Buján
- (Argentina) Tomas De Vincenti
- (Uruguay) Nicolás Schenone
- (Algeria) Salim Arrache
- (Ivory Coast) Ibrahima Bakayoko
- (Guinea) Jean Marie Sylla

== Personnel ==
=== Management ===
Position	Staff
Majority Owner	Giorgos Christovasilis
President and CEO	Giorgos Christovasilis
Director of Football	Thalis Tsirimokos (until 7 September 2009) Giorgos Theodoris (From 9 September 2009)
Head of Ticket Department	Alekos Potsis

=== Coaching staff ===
Position	Name
Head coach	Giorgos Paraschos (Until 6 December 2009) Thimios Georgoulis (From 7 December 2009 until 14 January 2010) Nikos Anastopoulos (From 14 January 2010)
Assistant coach	Thimios Georgoulis (Until 6 December 2009)
Fitness coach	Tasos Sideridis (Until 31 December 2009) Thomas Giannitopoulos (From 1 January 2010 until 16 January 2010) Thanasis Mourtziapis (From 16 January 2010 until 29 April 2010)
Goalkeepers Coach	Panagiotis Maliaritsis
Scout and Technical Director	Thimios Georgoulis

=== Medical staff ===
Position	Name
Head doctor	Spyros Siaravas
Physio	Filipos Skordos

=== Academy ===
Position	Name
Head of Youth Development	Thimios Georgoulis (From 14 January 2010)

== Transfers ==
=== Summer ===
==== In ====
No	Pos	Player	Transferred from	Fee	Date	Source
8	CM	Kostas Mendrinos	Olympiacos	-	27 May 2009	
23	FW	Patrick Dimbala	Levadiakos	-	27 May 2009	
16	DM / CB	Paraskevas Andralas	Levadiakos	-	27 May 2009	
33	GK	Dimitris Eleftheropoulos	Siena	-	30 May 2009	
21	CM	Lambros Vangelis	PAOK	-	31 May 2009	
19	CB	Ivica Majstorović	Panionios	-	11 June 2009	
10	FW	Dimitris Sialmas	Ethnikos Piraeus	-	11 June 2009	
91	LB	Giorgos Margaritis	Agrotikos Asteras	Undisclosed	16 June 2009	
5	CB	Ilias Kotsios	AEL	-	18 June 2009	
6	LB	Petros Kanakoudis	Asteras Tripolis	-	27 June 2009	
28	DM	Nicolás Schenone	Cerro Largo	-	27 June 2009	
17	RW	Kostantinos Kaznaferis	Pyrsos Grevena	Loan return	30 June 2009	
	FW	Christos Koutsospyros	Panachaiki	Loan return	30 June 2009	
	RB	Giannis Samaras	Pyrsos Grevena	Loan return	30 June 2009	
	CB	Apostolos Avramidis	Ethnikos Filippiada	Loan return	30 June 2009	
20	CM	Kostas Diamantidis	Fostiras	Loan return	30 June 2009	
	CM	Tomas De Vincenti	Excursionistas	-	4 July 2009	
13	DM	Sotiris Balafas	PAOK	Loan	16 July 2009	
20	FW	Ibrahima Bakayoko	PAOK	-	24 July 2009	
27	LB	Vanderson Scardovelli	Treviso	-	30 July 2009	
77	CB	Lefteris Vatsis	Achaiki	-		

==== Out ====
No	Pos	Player	Transferred to	Fee	Date	Source
	ST	Georgios Gougoulias	Pierikos	Released	27 June 2009	
77	FW	Ilias Solakis	Diagoras	End of contract	30 June 2009	
29	CM	Lucas Rimoldi	Panserraikos	End of contract	30 June 2009	
	ML	Federico Ariel García	Atletico de Rafaela	End of loan	30 June 2009	
	CM	Lucas Scaglia	Panserraikos	End of contract	30 June 2009	
21	DM	David Meza	Atromitos	End of loan	30 June 2009	
	DM	César Castro	Panserraikos	End of contract	30 June 2009	
24	CB	Giorgos Karakostas	Ethnikos Piraeus	Loan	4 July 2009	
8	CM	Luciano	Skoda Xanthi	End of contract	4 July 2009	
34	GK	Athanasios Kouventaris	Doxa Kranoula	Loan	5 July 2009	
19	RB	Giannis Samaras	Grevena Aerata	Released	8 July 2009	
3	LB	Kostas Pagonis	Ethnikos Piraeus	Loan	22 July 2009	
	CB	Panagiotis Tzimas	Ethnikos Filippiada	Loan	28 August 2009	
	RW	Giorgos Lappas	Ethnikos Filippiada	Loan		
	CB	Apostolos Avramidis	AO Pera Club			
20	CM	Kostas Diamantidis	PAO Dioikitiriou			

=== Winter ===
==== In ====
No	Pos	Player	Transferred from	Fee	Date	Source
81	RW	Mirnes Šišić	-	-	28 December 2009	
82	LW	Salim Arrache	Bastia	-	13 January 2010	
66	DM	Vasilios Rovas	Aris Thessaloniki	Loan	29 January 2010	

==== Out ====
No	Pos	Player	Transferred to	Fee	Date	Source
	CB	Spyros Gogolos	Ermis Aradippou	Released	22 December 2009	
13	DM	Sotiris Balafas	PAOK	Loan termination	13 January 2010	
	RB	Nikolaos Georgiadis	Diagoras	Released	13 January 2010	
	CM / CF	Evripidis Giakos	Doxa Kranoula	Loan		
25	CB	Alexios Michail	Panserraikos	Loan	14 January 2010	
	FW	Christos Koutsospyros	Kalamata	Loan	27 January 2010	
15	CM	Tomas De Vincenti	Kalamata	Loan	27 January 2010	
12	ML	Jean Marie Sylla	Kalamata	Loan	27 January 2010	
10	FW	Dimitris Sialmas	Olympiakos Volos	Loan	27 January 2010	
	DF	Giorgos Kolios	Anagennisi Arta	Loan		
91	LB	Giorgos Margaritis	Agrotikos Asteras	Loan		

== Pre-season and friendlies ==
Win Draw Loss Upcoming fixture

26 July 2009 Friendly	Pierikos	0-0	PAS Giannina	Katerini
19:00		Report		Stadium: Katerini Stadium; Referee: unknown

1 August 2009 Friendly	PAS Giannina	0-0	Nea Salamis Famagusta	Xanthi
19:00		Report		Stadium: Xanthi FC Arena; Referee: unknown

3 August 2009 Friendly	Doxa Drama	0-0	PAS Giannina	Drama
19:00		Report		Stadium: Doxa Drama Stadium; Attendance: 1500; Referee: unknown

8 August 2009 Friendly	Trikala	0-0	PAS Giannina	Trikala
19:00				Stadium: Trikala Municipal Stadium; Attendance: 1000; Referee: Vagelis Gratsanis

10 August 2009 Friendly	Panetolikos	0-0	PAS Giannina	Agrinio
18:00		Report		Stadium: Panetolikos Stadium; Attendance: 3500; Referee: unknown

12 August 2009 Friendly	Atromitos	1-1	PAS Giannina	Athens
19:30	Blengio 68'	Report	Kotsios 40'	Stadium: Peristeri Stadium; Referee: unknown

16 August 2009 Friendly	PAS Giannina	2-0	Doxa Kranoula	Ioannina
	Sialmas 56'; Kontogoulidis 62'	Report		Stadium: PEAKI; Referee: unknown

2 September 2009 Friendly	Anagennisi Arta	1-2	PAS Giannina	Arta
	Panagopoulos 75'	Report	Saitiotis 20' (pen.); Vangelis 43'	Stadium: Arta Stadium; Referee: unknown

6 September 2009 Friendly	PAS Giannina	4–1	Panetolikos	Ioannina
	Saitiotis 19'; Georgiadis 38'; Buján 56'; Sialmas 79'	Report	Thanopoulos 81'	Stadium: Zosimades Stadium; Referee: unknown

16 August 2009 Friendly	Doxa Kranoula	1-1	PAS Giannina	Kranoula
	Vlachos 25'	Report	Kontogoulidis 15'	Stadium: Kranoula Stadium; Referee: Miriounis

14 December 2009 Friendly	Panetolikos	0-2	PAS Giannina	Agrinio
			Koutsospyros 40', 54'	Stadium: Panetolikos Stadium; Attendance: 300; Referee: unknown

4 January 2010 Friendly	PAS Giannina	3–1	Doxa Kranoula	Ioannina
	Schenone (?); Giakos (?)		Vlachos (?)	Stadium: EPSIP stadium Referee: unknown

28 April 2010 Friendly	Thesprotos	0-4	PAS Giannina	Igoumenitsa
17:00			Vartziotis 37'; Kontogoulidis 44', 75'; Papadopulos 65'	Stadium: Municipal Stadium of Igoumenitsa; Referee: Giorgos Kominis

5 May 2010 Friendly	PAS Preveza	1-1	PAS Giannina	Preveza
17:00	Drouvas 2'		De Vincenti (?)	Stadium: Athanasia Tsoumeleka Municipal Stadium; Referee: Giorgos Roussos-Bekertzis

8 May 2010 Friendly	Nafpaktiakos Asteras	0-2	PAS Giannina	Nafpaktos
19:00			De Vincenti 18'; Kontogoulidis 35'	Stadium: Papacharalabeio Ethniko Stadio; Referee: unknown

12 May 2010 Friendly	Aris Filiati	1-2	PAS Giannina	Filiates
18:00	Anastasiou (?)		Kaznaferis (?); ? (?)	Stadium: Municipal Stadium of Filiati; Referee: unknown

19 May 2010 Friendly	PAS Giannina	1–1	Doxa Kranoula	Ioannina
18:00	Kontogoulidis 80'		Golias 60'	Stadium: Zosimades Stadium; Attendance: 200; Referee: Christos Mitsios

22 May 2010 Friendly	PAS Giannina	3–1	Ethnikos Filippiada	Ioannina
17:30	Tzanis 21'; De Vincenti 31'; Vangelis 73'		Basioukas 39'	Stadium: Zosimades Stadium; Attendance: 350; Referee: Konstantinos Boubas

== Competitions ==
=== League table ===
Pos	Team	Pld	W	D	L	GF	GA	GD	Pts	Qualification or relegation
12	Asteras Tripolis	30	10	6	14	29	36	−7	36 (Note: Head-to-head points: Ergotelis 6, Asteras Tripolis 0.)	
13	Skoda Xanthi	30	10	5	15	27	36	−9	35	
14	Levadiakos (R)	30	9	7	14	31	44	−13	34	Relegation to the Football League
15	PAS Giannina (R)	30	7	7	16	27	46	−19	28	Relegation to the Football League
16	Panthrakikos (R)	30	3	3	24	21	62	−41	12	Relegation to the Football League

Source: Super League Greece
Rules for classification: 1) Points; 2) Head-to-head points; 3) Head-to-head goal difference; 4) Play-offs (neutral ground).
(Note: Criterion 4 is only used if needed to decide champion, teams for relegation or teams for UEFA competitions).
(R) Relegated

==== Results summary ====
Overall								Home						Away					
Pld	W	D	L	GF	GA	GD	Pts	W	D	L	GF	GA	GD	W	D	L	GF	GA	GD
30	7	7	16	27	46	−19	28	6	4	5	17	14	+3	1	3	11	10	32	−22

==== Fixtures ====
Win Draw Loss Upcoming fixture

22 August 2009 1	Xanthi	1-1	PAS Giannina	Xanthi
16:45	Tziortziopoulos (yellow card) 53'; Leite 58'; Quintana (yellow card) 65'; Kostoulas (yellow card) 89'	Report	Tzanis 35'; Andralas (yellow card) 53'; Stathis (yellow card) 70'; Balafas (yellow card) 78'; Dimbala (yellow card) 88'; Elefteropoulos (yellow card) 90+4'	Stadium: Xanthi FC Arena; Attendance: 1913; Referee: Konstantinos Papastamatis

30 August 2009 2	PAS Giannina	2-0	Panthrakikos	Ioannina
16:45	Kotsios 34'; Dasios (yellow card) 64'; Tzanis 66'; Balafas (yellow card) 70'	Report	Marcelo Goianira (yellow card) 16' (yellow-red card) 80'; Orac (yellow card) 45+2'	Stadium: Zosimades Stadium; Attendance: 4642; Referee: Stavros Tritsonis

12 September 2009 3	Aris	1–0	PAS Giannina	Thessaloniki
19:00	Mehdi Nafti 3'; Mehdi Nafti (yellow card) 39'	Report	Dimbala (yellow card) 21'; Saitiotis (yellow card) 29'; Balafas (yellow card) 31'; Kotsios (yellow card) 70'; Dasios (yellow card) 90+1'	Stadium: Kleanthis Vikelidis Stadium; Attendance: 13383; Referee: Vassilios Paboridis

20 September 2009 4	PAS Giannina	1-1	AEK Athens	Ioannina
16:45	Andralas (yellow card) 22'; Dimbala (yellow card) 79' (yellow-red card) 79'; Kontogoulidis 81'; Sikalias (yellow card) 88'; Kontogoulidis (yellow card) 90'	Report	Roger (yellow card) 20'; Jahić (yellow card) 47'; Németh 52'	Stadium: Zosimades Stadium; Attendance: 6667; Referee: Dimitrios Kalopoulos

26 September 2009 5	Larissa	0-0	PAS Giannina	Larissa
16:45	Tuama (yellow card) 45+5'; Dabizas (yellow card) 88'	Report	Kotsios (yellow card) 34'; Bakayoko (yellow card) 63'	Stadium: Alcazar Stadium; Attendance: 2782; Referee: Ilias Spathas

3 October 2009 6	PAS Giannina	2–1	Kavala	Ioannina
16:45	Saitiotis 21', 84'; Andralas (yellow card) 45+1'	Report	Pavićević (yellow card) 32'; Ducrocq (yellow card) 60'; Ioannou 90+4'	Stadium: Zosimades Stadium; Attendance: 4285; Referee: Apostolos Abarkiolis

17 October 2009 7	PAOK	2-0	PAS Giannina	Thessaloniki
19:00	Conceição (yellow card) 25'; Ivić (yellow card) 39'; Lino 43'; Arabatzis 45+1'; Sorlin (yellow card) 90'	Report	Kanakoudis (yellow card) 27'; Vanderson (yellow card) 42'; Dasios (yellow card) 71'	Stadium: Toumba Stadium; Attendance: 13239; Referee: Mihail Tsiniaris

24 October 2009 8	Panionios	3-1	PAS Giannina	Nea Smyrni
19:00	Goundoulakis 16'; Balaban 23'; Casteglione 72'; Nicolaou (yellow card) 77'	Report	Kotsios (yellow card) 9'; Dimbala 15'; Kousas (yellow card) 25'; Vanderson (yellow card) 37'	Stadium: Nea Smyrni Stadium; Attendance: 5144; Referee: Mihail Voskakis

1 November 2009 9	PAS Giannina	1–1	Levadiakos	Ioannina
14:30	Andralas (yellow card) 12'; Andralas 29'	Report	Barkoglou 32'; Moulopoulos (yellow card) 53'; Machado (yellow card) 57'; Argyris Gatsos (yellow card) 75'	Stadium: Zosimades Stadium; Attendance: 4020; Referee: Anastasios Kakos

8 November 2009 10	Asteras Tripolis	3-0	PAS Giannina	Tripoli
16:45	Cesarec 13', 74', 82'; Wilchez (yellow card) 45+1'	Report	Michalopoulos (yellow card) 23'; Dasios (yellow card) 40'	Stadium: Theodoros Kolokotronis; Attendance: 1916; Referee: Mihail Dakos

21 November 2009 11	PAS Giannina	2-2	Olympiacos	Ioannina
19:00	Dimbala (yellow card) 13'; Kotsios (yellow card) 22'; Kanakoudis (yellow card) 28'; Vanderson (yellow card) 80'; Tzanis 83'; Bakayoko 90'	Report	Żewłakow 23'; Mitroglou 80'; Maresca (yellow card) 84'; Domi (yellow card) 87'; Papadopoulos (yellow card) 89'; Mitroglou (yellow card) 90'; Raúl Bravo (yellow card) 90+4'	Stadium: Zosimades Stadium; Attendance: 7500; Referee: Georgios Daloukas

29 November 2009 12	Atromitos	2-1	PAS Giannina	Athens
19:00	Apostolopoulos (yellow card) 13'; Melissas (yellow card) 50'; Luiz Brito 57'; Perrone 64'; Oliveira (yellow card) 75'	Report	Kousas (yellow card) 37'; Kanakoudis (yellow card) 48'; Dimbala 77'	Stadium: Peristeri Stadium; Attendance: 1559; Referee: Konstantinos Papastamatis

6 December 2009 13	PAS Giannina	2-3	Iraklis	Ioannina
14:30	Dimbala (yellow card) 30'; Saitiotis 34' (pen.), 90+1'; Georgiadis (yellow card) 36'; Balafas (yellow card) 78'; Vanderson (yellow card) 90+3'	Report	Perperidis (yellow card) 19'; Papasterianos (yellow card) 28'; Epstein 37' (pen.); Dică 52'; Touma (yellow card) 54'; Kone 86'	Stadium: Zosimades Stadium; Attendance: 4109; Referee: Marios Labropoulos

12 December 2009 14	PAS Giannina	1-0	Ergotelis	Ioannina
16:45	Kousas 30'; Buján (yellow card) 45+1'; Tzanis (yellow card) 62'; Majstorović (yellow card) 88'; Saitiotis (yellow card) 90+2'; Elefteropoulos (yellow card) 90+3'	Report	Kordonouris (yellow card) 88'	Stadium: Zosimades Stadium; Attendance: 3481; Referee: Dimitrios Kalopoulos

19 December 2009 15	Panathinaikos	4-0	PAS Giannina	Marousi
19:00	Cissé 50' (pen.), 75'; Vyntra 80'; Simão (yellow card) 83'; Christodoulopoulos 89'	Report	Georgiadis (yellow card) 37'; Andralas (yellow card) 49'; Vanderson (yellow card) 72'	Stadium: Olympic Stadium; Attendance: 16145; Referee: Nathaniel Haralambidis

5 January 2010 16	PAS Giannina	0-0	Xanthi	Ioannina
14:30	Michalopoulos (yellow card) 68'; Dasios (yellow card) 83'	Report	Stathakis (yellow card) 33'; Souanis (yellow card) 76'; Jaggy (yellow card) 90'	Stadium: Zosimades Stadium; Attendance: 3910; Referee: Mihail Koukoulakis

10 January 2010 17	Panthrakikos	1-2	PAS Giannina	Komotini
14:30	Papadopoulos (yellow card) 29'; Buval 42'; Matentzidis (yellow card) 64'; Marcelo Goianira (yellow card) 72'	Report	Tzanis 32', 62'; Kotsios (yellow card) 46'; Tzanis (yellow card) 63'; Sialmas (yellow card) 70'; Buján (yellow card) 77'	Stadium: Komotini Municipal Stadium; Attendance: 2685; Referee: Athanasios Giahos

17 January 2010 18	PAS Giannina	0-1	Aris Thessaloniki	Ioannina
16:45	Vanderson (yellow card) 77' (yellow-red card) 90+3'	Report	Ronaldo Guiaro (yellow card) 32'; Mehdi Nafti 51'; Mehdi Nafti (yellow card) 52'; Nacho García (yellow card) 90+2'	Stadium: Zosimades Stadium; Attendance: 6463; Referee: Andreas Pappas

24 January 2010 19	AEK Athens	3-1	PAS Giannina	Marousi
19:00	Djebbour 23'; Kafes 71', 90+3'; Kafes (yellow card) 72'	Report	Saitiotis 55'; Mendrinos (yellow card) 72'; Kousas (yellow card) 77'	Stadium: OAKA; Attendance: 5086; Referee: Vassilios Paboridis

30 January 2010 20	PAS Giannina	2-0	Larissa	Ioannina
16:45	Tzanis (yellow card) 50'; Šišić 55', 66'; Šišić (yellow card) 71'; Dimbala (yellow card) 86'	Report	Kyriakidis (yellow card) 52'; Flávio (yellow card) 71'; Blažek (yellow card) 71'	Stadium: Zosimades Stadium; Attendance: 0 (closed doors); Referee: Mihail Koukoulakis

6 February 2010 21	Kavala	1-0	PAS Giannina	Kavala
16:45	Kotsios 22' (o.g.); Smolarek (yellow card) 69' (yellow-red card) 90+1'; Dobrašinović (yellow card) 81'	Report	Tzanis (yellow card) 90+2'	Stadium: Kavala Stadium; Attendance: 1447; Referee: Athanasios Giahos

13 February 2010 22	PAS Giannina	0-1	PAOK	Ioannina
19:00	Kousas (yellow card) 29'; Šišić (yellow card) 45+1'; Dasios (yellow card) 48'; Kaznaferis (yellow card) 80'; Vanderson (yellow card) 82'	Report	Fotakis (yellow card) 41'; Fotakis 43'; Vieirinha (yellow card) 49'; Arabatzis (yellow card) 59' (yellow-red card) 63'; Moon (yellow card) 90+2'	Stadium: Zosimades Stadium; Attendance: 4191; Referee: Stavros Tritsonis

21 February 2010 23	PAS Giannina	2-3	Panionios	Ioannina
14:30	Andralas (yellow card) 6'; Mendrinos 30'; Saitiotis 44' (pen.); Rovas (yellow card) 47'; Kaznaferis (yellow card) 58'; Kotsios (yellow card) 73'; Kanakoudis (yellow card) 84'	Report	Cocalić 7'; Riera 18'; Maniatis (yellow card) 43'; Omo (yellow card) 74'; Buval (yellow card) 84'; Maniatis 85'; Andriolas (yellow card) 89'	Stadium: Zosimades Stadium; Attendance: 4398; Referee: Georgios Stathopoulos

28 February 2010 24	Levadiakos	4-1	PAS Giannina	Livadeia
16:45	Barkoglou 13'; Machado (yellow card) 14'; Agali 40', 71'; González 58'; Taralidis (yellow card) 81'	Report	Šišić (yellow card) 11'; Tzanis (yellow card) 18'; Bakayoko 87'; Kaznaferis (yellow card) 90+3'	Stadium: Levadia Municipal Stadium; Attendance: 2453; Referee: Georgios Daloukas

7 March 2010 25	PAS Giannina	1-0	Asteras Tripolis	Ioannina
14:30	Kaznaferis (yellow card) 48'; Bakayoko 90+2'; Andralas (yellow card) 90+2'; Sikalias (yellow card) 90+4'; Kanakoudis (yellow card) 90+5'	Report	Ladakis (yellow card) 41'; Udoji (yellow card) 58'; Marcelão (yellow card) 71'; Bastía (red card) 76'; Rokas (yellow card) 89'; Degra (yellow card) 90'	Stadium: Zosimades Stadium; Attendance: 3918; Referee: Dimitrios Kalopoulos

13 March 2010 26	Olympiacos	2-2	PAS Giannina	Piraeus
19:00	Derbyshire 39'; Mellberg (yellow card) 41'; LuaLua 45'; Papadopoulos (yellow card) 80'; Nikopolidis (yellow card) 90+1'	Report	A. Papadopoulos 37' (o.g.); Buján (yellow card) 37'; Bakayoko (yellow card) 41'; Mellberg 54' (o.g.); Vanderson (yellow card) 60'	Stadium: Karaiskakis Stadium; Attendance: 15969; Referee: Mihail Dakos

21 March 2010 27	PAS Giannina	1-0	Atromitos	Ioannina
19:00	Bakayoko 22'; Kaznaferis (yellow card) 49'; Buján (yellow card) 57'; Kanakoudis (yellow card) 71'; Zafeiropoulos (yellow card) 90+3'	Report	Saganowski (yellow card) 54'; Tatos (yellow card) 56'; Skondras (yellow card) 79'; Sarmiento (yellow card) 88'	Stadium: Zosimades Stadium; Attendance: 4107; Referee: Anastasios Sidiropoulos

28 March 2010 28	Iraklis	2-0	PAS Giannina	Thessaloniki
19:00	Iacob 27'; Iacob (yellow card) 37' (yellow-red card) 82'; Sarakatsanos (yellow card) 57'; Katsabis (yellow card) 65'; Matheus (yellow card) 89'; Giannoulis (yellow card) 90+2'; Iliadis 90+3'	Report	Šišić (yellow card) 22' (yellow-red card) 70'; Kotsios (yellow card) 73'; Kanakoudis (yellow card) 75'; Bakayoko (yellow card) 89'	Stadium: Kaftanzoglio Stadium; Attendance: 3155; Referee: Georgios Daloukas

11 April 2010 29	Ergotelis	3-1	PAS Giannina	Heraklion
19:00	Leal 37', 57' (pen.); Romano (yellow card) 45'; Leal (yellow card) 66'; Fragoulakis (yellow card) 83'; Fragoulakis 88'	Report	Arrache 49'; Kousas (red card) 88'	Stadium: Pankritio Stadium; Attendance: 1179; Referee: Georgios Stathopoulos

18 April 2010 30	PAS Giannina	0-1	Panathinaikos	Ioannina
19:00	Andralas (yellow card) 84'	Report	Simão (yellow card) 42'; Gabriel 56'	Stadium: Zosimades Stadium; Attendance: 4466; Referee: Marios Labropoulos

=== Greek cup ===
==== Round of 32 ====
27 October 2009 Round of 32	Kalamata	0-3	PAS Giannina	Kalamata
	Christos Maniatis (yellow card) ?'; Vasilios Athanasopoulos (yellow card) ?'; Pourtoulidis (yellow card) ?'	Report	Dimbala 15'; Sialmas 22'; Michalopoulos 61'; Dimbala (yellow card) ?'; Schenone (yellow card) ?'	Stadium: Kalamata Municipal Stadium; Referee: Athanasios Giahos

==== Round of 16 ====
20 January 2010 Round of 16	Atromitos	0-1 (a.e.t.)	PAS Giannina	Athens
	Nastos (yellow card) ?'; Sfakianakis (yellow card) ?'; Kalantzis (yellow card) ?'; Tatos (yellow card) ?'	Report	Mendrinos 96'; Kousas (yellow card) ?'; Buján (yellow card) ?'	Stadium: Peristeri Stadium; Referee: Apostolos Abarkiolis

==== Quarter-finals ====
2 February 2010 Quarter-finals	PAS Giannina	4-0	PAOK	Ioannina
17:00	Dimbala 8', 81'; Kousas 24'; Kousas (yellow card) 24'; Bakayoko (yellow card) 29'; Sznaucner 43' (o.g.); Sikalias (yellow card) 75'; Dasios (yellow card) 79'	Report	Vitolo (yellow card) 1'; García (yellow card) 23'; Savini (yellow card) 79'	Stadium: Zosimades Stadium; Referee: Stavros Tritsonis

==== Semi-finals ====
24 March 2010 1st leg	Panathinaikos	3-1	PAS Giannina	Marousi
17:00	Kotsios 14' (o.g.); Ninis 45'; Cissé 85'; Gilberto Silva (yellow card) ?'; Kanté (yellow card) ?'	Report	Kousas 90+4'; Michalopoulos (yellow card) ?'; Kotsios (yellow card) ?'; Kousas (yellow card) ?'	Stadium: Olympic Stadium; Attendance: 6,695; Referee: Giorgos Stathopoulos

7 April 2010 2nd leg	PAS Giannina	0-0	Panathinaikos	Ioannina
17:00	Arrache (yellow card) ?'; Kotsios (yellow card) ?' (yellow-red card) 89'; Kaznaferis (yellow card) ?'	Report	Vyntra (yellow card) ?'; Kanté (yellow card) ?'; Sarriegi (yellow card) ?' (yellow-red card) 84'	Stadium: Zosimades Stadium; Attendance: 5,566; Referee: Stavros Tritsonis

== Statistics ==
=== Appearances ===
No.	Pos.	Nat.	Name	Greek Super League	Greek Cup	Total
No.	Pos.	Nat.	Name	Apps	Apps	Apps
1	GK	(Greece)	Nikos Zafeiropoulos	8	3	11
2	RB	(Greece)	Georgios Dasios	23	2	25
3	RB	(Greece)	Giannis Stathis	10	2	12
4	CB	(Greece)	Georgios Kousas	23	5	28
5	CB	(Greece)	Ilias Kotsios	26	4	30
6	LB	(Greece)	Petros Kanakoudis	16	3	19
7	ML	(Greece)	Ilias Michalopoulos	17	4	21
8	CM	(Greece)	Kostas Mendrinos	24	2	26
9	FW	(Greece)	Giorgos Saitiotis	25	0	25
10	FW	(Greece)	Dimitris Sialmas	5	1	6
11	ST	(Greece)	Evangelos Kontogoulidis	7	5	12
12	ML	(Guinea)	Jean Marie Sylla	0	0	0
13	DM	(Greece)	Sotiris Balafas	11	0	11
14	CM	(Greece)	Kostas Pappas	0	0	0
15	CM	(Argentina)	Tomas De Vincenti	0	1	1
16	DM / CB	(Greece)	Paraskevas Andralas	16	4	20
17	RW	(Greece)	Kostantinos Kaznaferis	8	4	12
18	DM	(Argentina)	Esteban Buján	10	4	14
19	CB	(Croatia) (Germany)	Ivica Majstorović	26	1	27
20	FW	(Ivory Coast)	Ibrahima Bakayoko	24	3	27
21	CM	(Greece)	Lambros Vangelis	4	1	5
22	FW	(Greece)	Christos Tzanis	26	4	30
23	FW	(Democratic Republic of the Congo) (Belgium)	Patrick Dimbala	26	4	30
25	CB	(Greece)	Alexios Michail	0	1	1
27	LB	(Brazil) (Italy)	Vanderson Scardovelli	23	3	26
28	DM	(Uruguay)	Nicolás Schenone	1	1	2
30	GK	(Greece)	Georgios Sikalias	9	2	11
32	CB	(Greece)	Pavlos Vartziotis	1	1	2
33	GK	(Greece)	Dimitris Eleftheropoulos	16	0	16
66	DM	(Greece)	Vasilios Rovas	10	1	11
77	CB	(Greece)	Lefteris Vatsis	0	0	0
81	RW	(Slovenia)	Mirnes Šišić	15	0	15
82	LW	(Algeria)	Salim Arrache	4	4	8
88	RB	(Greece)	Nikolaos Georgiadis	5	0	5
91	LB	(Greece)	Giorgos Margaritis	0	0	0
	GK	(Greece)	Panagiotis Lolas	0	0	0
	LB	(Greece)	Kostas Louboutis	0	0	0
	CM	(Greece)	Panagiotis Christovasilis	0	0	0
	CB	(Greece)	Spyros Gogolos	0	0	0
	CM / CF	(Greece)	Evripidis Giakos	0	0	0
	FW	(Greece)	Christos Koutsospyros	0	0	0
	DF	(Greece)	Giorgos Kolios	0	0	0
	DF	(Greece)	Panagiotis Tzimas	0	0	0

Super League Greece

=== Goalscorers ===
No.	Pos.	Nat.	Name	Greek Super League	Greek Cup	Total
No.	Pos.	Nat.	Name	Goals	Goals	Goals
9	FW	(Greece)	Giorgos Saitiotis	6	0	6
22	FW	(Greece)	Christos Tzanis	5	0	5
23	FW	(Democratic Republic of the Congo) (Belgium)	Patrick Dimbala	2	3	5
20	FW	(Ivory Coast)	Ibrahima Bakayoko	4	0	4
4	CB	(Greece)	Georgios Kousas	1	2	3
8	CM	(Greece)	Kostas Mendrinos	1	1	2
81	RW	(Slovenia)	Mirnes Šišić	2	0	2
10	FW	(Greece)	Dimitris Sialmas	0	1	1
11	ST	(Greece)	Evangelos Kontogoulidis	1	0	1
16	DM / CB	(Greece)	Paraskevas Andralas	1	0	1
7	ML	(Greece)	Ilias Michalopoulos	0	1	1
5	CB	(Greece)	Ilias Kotsios	1	0	1
82	LW	(Algeria)	Salim Arrache	1	0	1
-	-	-	Own goals	2	1	3

Super League Greece

=== Clean sheets ===
No.	Pos.	Nat.	Name	Greek Super League	Greek Cup	Total
No.	Pos.	Nat.	Name	CS	CS	CS
1	GK	(Greece)	Nikos Zafeiropoulos	(1) 8	2 (3)	11
30	GK	(Greece)	Georgios Sikalias	(2) 9	2 (2)	11
33	GK	(Greece)	Dimitris Eleftheropoulos	(3) 16	0 (0)	16
	GK	(Greece)	Panagiotis Lolas	0 (0)	0 (0)	0 (0)

=== Disciplinary record ===
S	P	N	Name	Super League			Greek Cup			Total		
S	P	N	Name	Yellow card	Yellow-red card	Red card	Yellow card	Yellow-red card	Red card	Yellow card	Yellow-red card	Red card
1	GK	(Greece)	Nikos Zafeiropoulos	1	0	0	0	0	0	1	0	0
2	RB	(Greece)	Georgios Dasios	6	0	0	1	0	0	7	0	0
3	RB	(Greece)	Giannis Stathis	1	0	0	0	0	0	1	0	0
4	CB	(Greece)	Georgios Kousas	4	0	1	3	0	0	7	0	1
5	CB	(Greece)	Ilias Kotsios	7	0	0	1	1	0	8	1	0
6	LB	(Greece)	Petros Kanakoudis	7	0	0	0	0	0	7	0	0
7	ML	(Greece)	Ilias Michalopoulos	2	0	0	1	0	0	3	0	0
8	CM	(Greece)	Kostas Mendrinos	1	0	0	0	0	0	1	0	0
9	FW	(Greece)	Giorgos Saitiotis	2	0	0	0	0	0	2	0	0
10	FW	(Greece)	Dimitris Sialmas	1	0	0	0	0	0	1	0	0
11	ST	(Greece)	Evangelos Kontogoulidis	1	0	0	0	0	0	1	0	0
13	DM	(Greece)	Sotiris Balafas	4	0	0	0	0	0	4	0	0
16	DM / CB	(Greece)	Paraskevas Andralas	8	0	0	0	0	0	8	0	0
17	RW	(Greece)	Kostantinos Kaznaferis	5	0	0	1	0	0	6	0	0
18	DM	(Argentina)	Esteban Buján	4	0	0	1	0	0	5	0	0
19	CB	(Croatia) (Germany)	Ivica Majstorović	1	0	0	0	0	0	1	0	0
20	FW	(Ivory Coast)	Ibrahima Bakayoko	3	0	0	1	0	0	4	0	0
22	FW	(Greece)	Christos Tzanis	5	0	0	0	0	0	5	0	0
23	FW	(Democratic Republic of the Congo) (Belgium)	Patrick Dimbala	5	1	0	1	0	0	6	1	0
27	LB	(Brazil) (Italy)	Vanderson Scardovelli	7	1	0	0	0	0	7	1	0
28	DM	(Uruguay)	Nicolás Schenone	0	0	0	1	0	0	1	0	0
30	GK	(Greece)	Georgios Sikalias	2	0	0	1	0	0	3	0	0
33	GK	(Greece)	Dimitris Eleftheropoulos	2	0	0	0	0	0	2	0	0
66	DM	(Greece)	Vasilios Rovas	1	0	0	0	0	0	1	0	0
81	RW	(Slovenia)	Mirnes Šišić	3	1	0	0	0	0	3	1	0
82	LW	(Algeria)	Salim Arrache	0	0	0	1	0	0	1	0	0
88	RB	(Greece)	Nikolaos Georgiadis	2	0	0	0	0	0	2	0	0
