= List of Greek football transfers summer 2009 =

This is a list of Greek football transfers for the 2009–10 summer transfer window by club. Only transfers of the 2009–10 Super League Greece clubs are included.

The summer transfer window opened on 1 June 2009, although a few transfers took place prior to that date. The window closed at midnight on 31 August 2009. Players without a club may join one at any time, either during or in between transfer windows.

== Transfers ==
=== AEK Athens ===
In: Note: Flags indicate national team as defined under FIFA eligibility rules; some limited exceptions apply. Players may hold more than one non-FIFA nationality.

No.	Pos.	Nation	Player
2	DF	ARG	Carlos Araujo (from Huracán for free)
3	MF	NED	Youssouf Hersi (from FC Twente)
9	MF	BRA	Leonardo (from Levadiakos for €800K)
12	DF	BIH	Sanel Jahić (from Aris for €590K)
14	MF	GRE	Grigoris Makos (from Panionios for €860K)
15	DF	GRE	Nikolaos Karabelas (from Aris for free)
16	MF	POL	Roger Guerreiro (from Legia Warsaw)
24	DF	GRE	Kostas Manolas (from Thrasyvoulos for €50K)
27	GK	SRB	Milan Lukač (from Čukarički for €300K)
29	FW	HUN	Krisztián Németh (from Liverpool on loan)
30	MF	ROU	Ilie Iordache (from Pandurii for €5)
87	DF	ARG	Nicolás Bianchi Arce (from San Lorenzo for €300K)

Out: Note: Flags indicate national team as defined under FIFA eligibility rules; some limited exceptions apply. Players may hold more than one non-FIFA nationality.

No.	Pos.	Nation	Player
80	MF	CYP	Giorgos Tofas (to Anorthosis FC for €70K)
28	GK	ITA	Stefano Sorrentino (to Chievo Verona for €600K)
16	DF	GRE	Sotiris Kyrgiakos (to Liverpool for €3m)
80	GK	GRE	Giannis Fysekis (released)
16	MF	GRE	Vasileios Pliatsikas (to Schalke 04 for €400K)
77	GK	AUT	Jürgen Macho (end of contract)
12	DF	FRA	Olivier N'Siabamfumu (end of contract)
24	DF	ARG	Agustín Pelletieri (loan return to Lanús)
40	FW	GRE	Panagiotis Zorbas (on loan to OFI)
80	MF	SEN	El Hadji Diouf (released)
20	FW	AUS	Nathan Burns (on loan to Kerkyra)
56	MF	FIN	Perparim Hetemaj (to FC Twente)

=== AEL ===
In: Note: Flags indicate national team as defined under FIFA eligibility rules; some limited exceptions apply. Players may hold more than one non-FIFA nationality.

No.	Pos.	Nation	Player
6	MF	BRA	Delson (from Rio Ave)
9	FW	MEX	Antonio de Nigris (from Ankaragücü)
10	MF	ISR	Salim Tuama (from Standard Liège)
17	MF	SRB	Aleksandar Simić (from OFI)
18	GK	POL	Arkadiusz Malarz (from Panathinaikos)
20	FW	ARG	Gastón Casas (from Ionikos)
21	MF	BRA	Romeu (from Fluminense)
22	DF	GRE	Theodoros Tripotseris (from Levadiakos)
23	FW	BRA	Caio (from Atlético do Porto)
25	GK	GRE	Dimitrios Sotiriou (from Fostiras)
26	DF	GRE	Dimitrios Kolovetsios (from Tyrnavos)
45	DF	GRE	Christos Melissis (on loan from Panathinaikos)
79	FW	GRE	Georgios Lytras (from Youth Team)
92	MF	GRE	Savvas Siatravanis (from Youth Team)
99	FW	ISR	Shimon Abuhatzira (from Hapoel Petah Tikva)
—	GK	URU	Sebastián Viera (from Villarreal, plays from January 1, 2010)

Out: Note: Flags indicate national team as defined under FIFA eligibility rules; some limited exceptions apply. Players may hold more than one non-FIFA nationality.

No.	Pos.	Nation	Player
25	GK	GRE	Stefanos Kotsolis (to Omonia)
83	GK	CRO	Tomislav Vranjic (free agent)
50	DF	ARG	Mauricio Ferrari (loan return to Ben Hur)
2	DF	GRE	Ilias Kotsios (to PAS Giannina)
46	DF	GER	Christian Weber (to Fortuna Düsseldorf)
18	MF	GRE	Georgios Fotakis (to PAOK)
10	MF	CIV	Did'dy Guela (to Arminia Bielefeld)
22	MF	SRB	Saša Ilić (loan return to Salzburg)
33	FW	AUS	Sakis Theodoropoulos (loan return to Panionios)
7	MF	GRE	Anastasios Kyriakos (to Omonia)
37	MF	GRE	Andreas Labropoulos (to Kerkyra)
44	MF	ARG	Milton Axel Müller (on loan to Ionikos)
32	MF	FRA	Laurent Robert (free agent)
6	DF	POR	Bruno Pereira (to APOEL)
17	MF	ARG	Marcelo Sarmiento (to Atromitos)
71	FW	GRE	Athanasios Tsigas (to Kerkyra)
79	FW	POL	Maciej Żurawski (to Omonia)

=== Aris ===
In: Note: Flags indicate national team as defined under FIFA eligibility rules; some limited exceptions apply. Players may hold more than one non-FIFA nationality.

No.	Pos.	Nation	Player
3	DF	ARG	Carlos Arano (from Huracan for free)
6	MF	TUN	Mehdi Nafti (from Birmingham for free)
11	MF	ARG	Leandro Gracián (on loan from Boca Juniors)
13	FW	URU	Sebastian Abreu (from Real Sociedad for free)
15	DF	ARG	Cristian Nasuti (on loan from River Plate)
23	FW	GRE	Christos Aravidis (from Panionios for free)
25	DF	BRA	Flávio Pinto de Souza (from Asteras Tripolis for free)
44	FW	AUS	Sakis Theodoropoulos (on loan from Panionios)
84	MF	ARG	Pitu (from Unión de Santa Fe for free)
86	GK	BRA	Renato Piovezan (from Chievo)
99	FW	IRL	Ian Daly (from Manchester City for free)

Out: Note: Flags indicate national team as defined under FIFA eligibility rules; some limited exceptions apply. Players may hold more than one non-FIFA nationality.

No.	Pos.	Nation	Player
1	GK	SVK	Marian Kelemen (free to Numancia)
19	FW	GRE	Athanasios Papazoglou (free to PAOK)
15	DF	GRE	Nikolaos Karabellas (free to AEK Athens)
24	MF	ESP	Vitolo (free to PAOK)
9	MF	BRA	Thiago Gentil (free to Coritiba)
17	FW	POL	Piotr Włodarczyk (free to Legia Warsaw)
22	MF	BRA	Marco Aurélio (on loan to Santander)
13	DF	GRE	Dimitrios Karatziovalis (free to Doxa Drama)
26	DF	BIH	Sanel Jahić (to AEK Athens)

=== Asteras Tripolis ===
In: Note: Flags indicate national team as defined under FIFA eligibility rules; some limited exceptions apply. Players may hold more than one non-FIFA nationality.

No.	Pos.	Nation	Player
4	DF	GRE	Konstantinos Lambropoulos (from Apollon Kalamarias)
10	FW	BRA	Éder (from Vila Nova)
18	MF	ARG	Sebastián Carrera (from Arsenal de Sarandí)
22	DF	ARG	Sebastián Bartolini (from Talleres)
23	FW	NGA	Shikoze Udoji (from PFC CSKA Sofia)
31	MF	ARG	Lucas Wilchez (from Talleres)
32	GK	ARG	Matías Degra (from Veria)
44	MF	ARG	Leonel Ríos (from Independiente)
90	GK	GRE	Giannis Mitseas (from Aiolikos)
92	DF	GRE	Giannis Sentementes (from Panserraikos)

Out: Note: Flags indicate national team as defined under FIFA eligibility rules; some limited exceptions apply. Players may hold more than one non-FIFA nationality.

No.	Pos.	Nation	Player
17	MF	MAR	Jaouad Zairi (free to Olympiacos)
31	FW	ARG	Lucio Filomeno (free to PAOK)
7	MF	ARG	Mauro Milano (free to Iraklis)
4	DF	POR	Fabeta (free to Beira Mar)
6	MF	GRE	Petros Kanakoudis (free to PAS Giannina)
18	MF	POR	Fábio Felício (loan return to Rubin Kazan)
15	DF	BRA	Flávio (released)
3	MF	GRE	Nikos-Georgios Stratakis (released)
5	DF	GRE	Manolis Psomas (to Kavala)

=== Atromitos ===
In: Note: Flags indicate national team as defined under FIFA eligibility rules; some limited exceptions apply. Players may hold more than one non-FIFA nationality.

No.	Pos.	Nation	Player
1	GK	GRE	Fotios Kipouros (from Panserraikos)
2	DF	ARG	Juan Carlos Blengio (on loan from Club Atlético Tigre)
3	DF	GRE	Evangelos Koutsopoulos (from Panionios)
4	DF	POL	Marcin Baszczyński (from Wisła Kraków)
7	FW	GRE	Ilias Anastasakos (from PAOK)
12	GK	GRE	Fotios Kipouros (from AS Rodos was on loan)
13	DF	GRE	Evangelos Nastos (from Ascoli)
14	FW	GRE	Ilias Kampas (from Ilisiakos)
17	MF	ARG	Marcelo Sarmiento (from AEL)
18	FW	CRO	Zdravko Popović (from OFI)
19	MF	GRE	Stelios Sfakianakis (from OFI)
25	MF	GRE	Athanasios Karagounis (from Fokikos)

Out: Note: Flags indicate national team as defined under FIFA eligibility rules; some limited exceptions apply. Players may hold more than one non-FIFA nationality.

No.	Pos.	Nation	Player
2	DF	GRE	Ioannis Katemis (to Panetolikos)
3	DF	USA	Grigoris-Henry Kokolakis (on loan to PAO Rouf)
4	MF	GRE	Dimitrios Ioannou (to AO Kerkyra)
6	MF	GRE	Vasilios Rovas (to Aris)
16	DF	GRE	Michalis Kripintiris (to Ethnikos Asteras)
19	MF	ARG	Lucas Trejo (on loan to Egaleo)
22	MF	PAR	Derlis David Meza Colli (on loan to AO Kalamata)
24	DF	GRE	Thanasis Papageorgiou (on loan to Panargiakos)
28	MF	GRE	Petros Kaminiotis (on loan to AO Kalamata)
29	FW	GRE	Vasilios Res (on loan to Panargiakos)
31	GK	GRE	Apostolos Androutsos (on loan to GS Kallithea)
32	DF	GRE	Apostolos Skondras (to Panargiakos)
33	DF	GRE	Stergos Marinos (to Panathinaikos)
34	FW	GRE	Vlasis Kazakis (to Panthrakikos)
36	FW	CMR	Dominique Wassi (on loan Egaleo)

=== Ergotelis ===
In: Note: Flags indicate national team as defined under FIFA eligibility rules; some limited exceptions apply. Players may hold more than one non-FIFA nationality.

No.	Pos.	Nation	Player
4	DF	POL	Tomasz Wisio (from LASK Linz)
9	FW	LVA	Māris Verpakovskis (from Dynamo Kyiv)
18	MF	CRO	Mateo Bertosa (from NK Rijeka)
20	DF	GRE	Georgios Siakkas (from Panserraikos)
33	MF	LTU	Deividas Česnauskis (from Heart of Midlothian)
37	DF	GEO	Giorgi Shashiashvili (from Sturm Graz)

Out: Note: Flags indicate national team as defined under FIFA eligibility rules; some limited exceptions apply. Players may hold more than one non-FIFA nationality.

No.	Pos.	Nation	Player
19	MF	GRE	Vasilios Koutsianikoulis (to PAOK for 1.200.000€)
33	DF	GRE	Charis Mattheakis (released)
4	DF	GRE	Labros Kefaloukos (released)
26	DF	AUT	Gernot Plassnegger (released)
18	MF	POR	Daniel Kenedy (released)

=== Iraklis ===
In: Note: Flags indicate national team as defined under FIFA eligibility rules; some limited exceptions apply. Players may hold more than one non-FIFA nationality.

No.	Pos.	Nation	Player
7	MF	SWE	Sharbel Touma (from Borussia Mönchengladbach)
10	MF	ROU	Nicolae Dică (on loan from Calcio Catania)
12	FW	CRO	Ivan Bošnjak (from K.R.C. Genk)
20	FW	ROU	Victoraş Iacob (from CS Otopeni)
24	MF	ITA	Samuele Dalla Bona (on loan from S.S.C. Napoli)
27	DF	ARG	Matías Lequi (from Celta de Vigo)
28	MF	POR	Nuno Piloto (from Académica Coimbra)
32	MF	ARG	Mauro Milano (from Asteras Tripolis)
88	MF	GRE	Stelios Iliadis (from PAOK)
—	MF	MDA	Cristian Efros (from Beşiktaş Chişinău)

Out: Note: Flags indicate national team as defined under FIFA eligibility rules; some limited exceptions apply. Players may hold more than one non-FIFA nationality.

No.	Pos.	Nation	Player
—	FW	ESP	Kiko Ratón (released)
—	DF	GRE	Savvas Exouzidis (to Pierikos)
—	MF	ESP	Fernando Marqués (released)
—	MF	ARG	Miguel Sebastián Garcia (loan return to Unión de Santa Fe)
—	FW	GRE	Aggelos Komvolidis (released)
—	FW	GRE	Errikos Drambis (released)

=== Kavala ===
In: Note: Flags indicate national team as defined under FIFA eligibility rules; some limited exceptions apply. Players may hold more than one non-FIFA nationality.

No.	Pos.	Nation	Player
1	GK	AUS	Željko Kalac (from Milan)
2	DF	MNE	Savo Pavićević (from FC Energie Cottbus)
5	DF	GRE	Stefanos Siontis (from Panathinaikos)
6	MF	MNE	Siniša Dobrasinović (from Anorthosis Famagusta)
8	DF	GRE	Sotiris Leontiou (on loan from Panathinaikos)
11	FW	SEN	Frédéric Mendy (from SC Bastia)
14	MF	FRA	Pierre Ducrocq (from RC Strasbourg)
15	FW	BRA	Diogo Rincón (from FC Dynamo Kyiv)
18	DF	GRE	Evangelos Ikonomou (from Ionikos)
22	DF	GRE	Manolis Psomas (from Asteras Tripolis)
23	MF	GRE	Vasilios Lakis (from PAOK)
29	FW	GRE	Apostolos Giannou (from Apollon Kalamarias)
30	GK	FRA	Charles Itandje (on loan from Liverpool)
40	DF	BRA	Douglão (from FC Nantes)
44	FW	GRE	Ilias Ioannou (from Olympiacos Volos)
80	FW	NGA	Benjamin Onwuachi (from Ionikos)
90	FW	AUS	Robert Stambolziev (on loan from Panathinaikos)
7	MF	SRB	Aleksandar Popović (from FK Vojvodina)

Out: Note: Flags indicate national team as defined under FIFA eligibility rules; some limited exceptions apply. Players may hold more than one non-FIFA nationality.

No.	Pos.	Nation	Player
3	DF	GRE	Konstantinos Barbas (to Agrotikos Asteras)
5	MF	GRE	Miltiadis Sapanis (to Thrasyvoulos)
6	MF	GRE	Ioannis Tatsis (released)
8	MF	GRE	Christos Chatzipantelidis (to Ethnikos Asteras)
11	FW	GRE	Nikos Tsiblidis (released)
12	FW	GRE	Marios Mavroudis (to Niki Volos)
20	MF	GRE	Christos Stamos (released)
28	MF	GRE	Giorgos Katerinis (released)
34	MF	GRE	Vangelis Georgiou (loan return to PAOK)
77	MF	GRE	Christos Kagkiouzis (to Ethnikos Asteras)
—	DF	GRE	Ilias Seferidis (to Veria)
—	MF	GRE	Markos Chatziiliadis (on loan to Nestos Chrisoupolis)
—	DF	GRE	Vaggelis Galanis (on loan to Panargiakos)

=== Levadiakos ===
In: Note: Flags indicate national team as defined under FIFA eligibility rules; some limited exceptions apply. Players may hold more than one non-FIFA nationality.

No.	Pos.	Nation	Player
4	DF	ARG	Federico Martorell (from Thrasyvoulos)
7	MF	POR	Serginho (Pierikos)
10	MF	POR	Paulo Costa (from AC Omonia)
11	FW	ARG	Gustavo Balvorín (from Club Atlético Lanús)
14	DF	CMR	Serge Branco (from MSV Duisburg)
15	FW	NGA	Victor Agali (from Anorthosis)
17	MF	GRE	Giannis Taralidis (from OFI)
20	DF	GRE	Georgios Koltsis (from Veria)
21	MF	GRE	Giorgos Barkoglou (from Panionios)
22	DF	GRE	Dimitrios Chaloulos (from Rodos)
23	FW	GRE	Athanasios Lemonis (from Marco)
24	DF	GRE	Ioannis Alexiou (from Veria)
98	DF	GRE	Dimitrios Galanopoulos (from Leondio)

Out: Note: Flags indicate national team as defined under FIFA eligibility rules; some limited exceptions apply. Players may hold more than one non-FIFA nationality.

No.	Pos.	Nation	Player
—	FW	COD	Patrick Dimbala (to PAS Giannina)
—	DF	BUL	Borislav Georgiev (to Slavia Sofia)
—	DF	GRE	Paraskevas Andralas (to PAS Giannina)
—	DF	GRE	Theodoros Tripotseris (to AEL)
—	MF	GRE	Georgios Katsikogiannis (loan return to Olympiacos)
—	MF	MLI	Toure Basala (released)
—	MF	RWA	Fritz Emeran (released)
—	DF	GRE	Ilias Tsellos (released)
—	FW	FIN	Toni Lehtinen (released)
—	MF	POL	Piotr Piechniak (released)
—	MF	BRA	Leonardo (to AEK Athens)
—	FW	ARG	Eduardo Ariel Montoya (released)
—	MF	GRE	Kostas Kiassos (free to OFI)

=== Olympiacos ===
In: Note: Flags indicate national team as defined under FIFA eligibility rules; some limited exceptions apply. Players may hold more than one non-FIFA nationality.

No.	Pos.	Nation	Player
4	DF	SWE	Olof Mellberg (from Juventus)
9	FW	ENG	Matt Derbyshire (from Blackburn Rovers)
11	MF	MAR	Jaouad Zairi (from Asteras Tripolis, free transfer)
15	DF	ESP	Raúl Bravo (loan return)
25	MF	ITA	Enzo Maresca (from Sevilla)
28	MF	ARG	Cristian Raul Ledesma (loan return)
78	GK	ESP	Urko Rafael Pardo (on loan from Rapid București)
88	MF	GRE	Georgios Katsikogiannis (loan return)

Out: Note: Flags indicate national team as defined under FIFA eligibility rules; some limited exceptions apply. Players may hold more than one non-FIFA nationality.

No.	Pos.	Nation	Player
—	DF	GRE	Konstantinos Lambropoulos (to Asteras Tripolis)
—	MF	ARG	Sebastian Leto (loan return to Liverpool)
—	MF	GRE	Christos Patsatzoglou (to AC Omonia)
—	MF	GRE	Konstantinos Mendrinos (to PAS Giannina)
—	DF	GRE	Paraskevas Antzas (retired)
—	MF	SRB	Predrag Djordjević (retired)
—	FW	SRB	Darko Kovačević (retired)
—	MF	ARG	Fernando Belluschi (to FC Porto)

=== Panathinaikos ===
In: Note: Flags indicate national team as defined under FIFA eligibility rules; some limited exceptions apply. Players may hold more than one non-FIFA nationality.

No.	Pos.	Nation	Player
8	DF	MLI	Cédric Kanté (from Nice) free agent
9	FW	FRA	Djibril Cissé (from Marseille) for €8,500,000
11	MF	ARG	Sebastian Leto (from Liverpool) for €4,000,000
18	DF	SWE	Mattias Bjärsmyr (from Göteborg) for €450,000
22	DF	GRE	Stergos Marinos (from Atromitos) for €100,000
25	DF	GRE	Giourkas Seitaridis (from Atlético Madrid) free agent
29	MF	GRE	Kostas Katsouranis (from Benfica) for €3,500,000

Out: Note: Flags indicate national team as defined under FIFA eligibility rules; some limited exceptions apply. Players may hold more than one non-FIFA nationality.

No.	Pos.	Nation	Player
—	DF	SWE	Mikael Nilsson (free to Brøndby)
—	DF	POL	Jakub Wawrzyniak (loan return to Legia Warsaw)
—	DF	GRE	Giannis Goumas (retired)
—	GK	POL	Arkadiusz Malarz (free to AEL)
—	DF	GRE	Stefanos Siontis (free to Kavala)
—	DF	RSA	Nasief Morris (on loan to Racing Santander)
—	MF	AUT	Andreas Ivanschitz (on loan to Mainz)
—	DF	BRA	David (on loan to Flamengo)
—	MF	GRE	Sotiris Leontiou (on loan to Kavala)
—	FW	AUS	Robert Stambolziev (on loan to Kavala)
—	MF	BRA	Marcelo Mattos (on loan to Corinthians)
—	DF	GRE	Christos Melissis (on loan to AEL)
—	DF	RSA	Bryce Moon (on loan to PAOK)

=== Panionios ===
In: Note: Flags indicate national team as defined under FIFA eligibility rules; some limited exceptions apply. Players may hold more than one non-FIFA nationality.

No.	Pos.	Nation	Player
3	DF	BRA	Wellington Baroni (loan from RCD Espanyol)
6	DF	NGA	Suleiman Omo (from Ilisiakos)
8	FW	ESP	Sito Riera (from RCD Espanyol)
9	FW	CRO	Boško Balaban (from Dinamo Zagreb)
10	FW	AUS	Sakis Theodoropoulos (loan return from AEL)
13	DF	ARG	Carlos Casteglione (loan from Arsenal de Sarandí)
30	GK	ESP	Isaac Jimenez Becerra (loan from RCD Espanyol)

Out: Note: Flags indicate national team as defined under FIFA eligibility rules; some limited exceptions apply. Players may hold more than one non-FIFA nationality.

No.	Pos.	Nation	Player
—	GK	CRO	Dario Kresic (to PAOK)
—	DF	MLI	Sékou Berthé (released from club)
—	DF	GRE	Vangelis Koutsopoulos (to Atromitos)
—	FW	AUS	Sakis Theodoropoulos (on loan to Aris)
—	MF	GRE	Christos Aravidis (to Aris)
—	FW	GRE	Giorgos Barkoglou (to Levadiakos)
—	MF	GRE	Grigoris Makos (to AEK Athens for €860,000)

=== Panthrakikos ===
In: Note: Flags indicate national team as defined under FIFA eligibility rules; some limited exceptions apply. Players may hold more than one non-FIFA nationality.

No.	Pos.	Nation	Player
3	DF	GRE	Eleftherios Sakelariou (from Ethnikos Asteras)
4	DF	SRB	Željko Đokić (from FK Javor)
5	MF	BRA	Marcelo Goianira (from C.F. Estrela da Amadora)
7	FW	SRB	Filip Arsenijević (from FK Javor)
8	MF	FRA	Bertrand Robert (from FC Lorient)
9	FW	FRA	Bédi Buval (from Randers FC)
10	MF	MLT	Udo Nwoko (from Leixões S.C.)
11	MF	ROU	Daniel Orac (from CS Pandurii)
17	MF	POR	João Fajardo (from Vitória Guimarães)
19	GK	GRE	Dimitrios Tairis (from Visaltiakos)
21	FW	GRE	Kostas Kapetanos (from Kerkyra)
22	DF	CMR	Alexis N'Gambi (from FK Daugava Rīga)
26	FW	CMR	Steve Beleck Leo (free agent)
34	FW	GRE	Vlasis Kazakis (from Atromitos F.C.)
86	DF	ALB	Thomas Kostantini (from free agent)
88	MF	ARG	Juan Manuel Munafo (free agent)
91	MF	CRO	Ivan Nimac (free agent)
99	MF	ROU	Marius Mitu (from FC Progresul București)

Out: Note: Flags indicate national team as defined under FIFA eligibility rules; some limited exceptions apply. Players may hold more than one non-FIFA nationality.

No.	Pos.	Nation	Player
3	DF	GRE	Giorgos Katerinis (released)
5	DF	GRE	Nikos Zapropoulos (released)
6	DF	BRA	Robinho (released)
7	FW	BEL	Tim Matthys (released)
8	MF	GRE	Xenofon Gittas (released)
9	FW	ESP	Sito Riera (loan return to RCD Espanyol)
10	MF	ARG	Sergio Ponce (loan return to Chacarita Juniors)
14	FW	ARG	Julio Bevacqua (released)
19	FW	ESP	Alexis Vidal (loan return to RCD Espanyol)
22	MF	GRE	Konstantinos Semertzidis (released)
26	MF	POR	Manuel Lopes (on loan to Panetolikos F.C.)
33	FW	GRE	Athanasios Danidis (released)
45	GK	CRO	Zlatko Runje (released)
86	DF	ALB	Thomas Kostantini (on loan to Gouva City F.C.)
-	MF	GRE	Ioannis Barboutelis (on loan to Neoi Epivates F.C.)
-	FW	GRE	Amet Doiran (on loan to Neoi Epivates F.C.)

=== PAOK ===
In: Note: Flags indicate national team as defined under FIFA eligibility rules; some limited exceptions apply. Players may hold more than one non-FIFA nationality.

No.	Pos.	Nation	Player
3	DF	RSA	Bryce Moon (on loan from Panathinaikos)
6	MF	ESP	Vitolo (from Racing Santander for free)
8	DF	ITA	Bruno Cirillo (from Reggina Calcio for free)
10	MF	FRA	Olivier Sorlin (from Stade Rennes for 350.000€)
14	FW	GRE	Athanasios Papazoglou (from Aris for free)
18	MF	GRE	Georgios Fotakis (from AEL for free)
19	FW	GRE	Vasilios Koutsianikoulis (from Ergotelis for 1.200.000€)
20	MF	POR	Vieirinha (from Porto for 300.000€)
28	MF	GHA	Mohammed Abubakari (from Panserraikos for free)
31	FW	ARG	Lucio Filomeno (from Asteras Tripolis for free)
36	DF	ITA	Mirko Savini (from Palermo for free)
91	GK	CRO	Dario Krešić (from Panionios for free)

Out: Note: Flags indicate national team as defined under FIFA eligibility rules; some limited exceptions apply. Players may hold more than one non-FIFA nationality.

No.	Pos.	Nation	Player
4	DF	BRA	Marcos Antonio (return to AJ Auxerre)
6	DF	GRE	Filipos Darlas (return to Panathinaikos)
18	MF	GRE	Lambros Vangelis (free to PAS Giannina)
10	FW	CIV	Ibrahima Bakayoko (free to PAS Giannina)
3	DF	GRE	Pantelis Konstantinidis (free to OFI)
8	MF	GRE	Stelios Iliadis (free to Iraklis)
23	FW	GRE	Vasilios Lakis (free to Kavala)
50	GK	GRE	Dimitris Rizos (free)
79	FW	GRE	Lambros Choutos (free to Kavala)
28	FW	GRE	Stefanos Athanasiadis (on loan to Panserraikos)
31	DF	GRE	Vagelis Georgiou (on loan to Panserraikos)
71	GK	GRE	Panagiotis Glikos (on loan to Olympiacos Volos)
25	MF	GRE	Sotiris Balafas (on loan to PAS Giannina)
9	FW	GRE	Ilias Anastasakos (to Atromitos)

=== PAS Giannina ===
In: Note: Flags indicate national team as defined under FIFA eligibility rules; some limited exceptions apply. Players may hold more than one non-FIFA nationality.

No.	Pos.	Nation	Player
5	DF	GRE	Ilias Kotsios (From AEL)
6	MF	GRE	Petros Kanakoudis (From Asteras Tripolis)
8	MF	GRE	Konstantinos Mendrinos (From Olympiacos F.C.)
10	FW	GRE	Dimitris Sialmas (From Ethnikos Piraeus F.C.)
15	MF	ARG	Tomas Sebastian De Vincenti (From Excursionistas)
16	DF	GRE	Paraskevas Andralas (From Levadiakos)
19	DF	CRO	Ivica Majstorović (From Panionios F.C.)
20	FW	CIV	Ibrahima Bakayoko (From PAOK)
21	MF	GRE	Lambros Vangelis (From PAOK)
23	FW	COD	Patrick Dimbala (From Levadiakos)
27	DF	BRA	Vanderson Scardovelli (From Treviso)
28	MF	URU	Nicolas Schenone (From Cerro Largo FC)
33	GK	GRE	Dimitrios Eleftheropoulos (From A.C. Siena)
77	DF	GRE	Eleytherios Vatsis (From Achaiki)
91	DF	GRE	Giorgos Margaritis (From Agrotikos Asteras)
-	DF	GRE	Apostolos Avramidis (From PAS Preveza)

Out: Note: Flags indicate national team as defined under FIFA eligibility rules; some limited exceptions apply. Players may hold more than one non-FIFA nationality.

No.	Pos.	Nation	Player
—	DF	GRE	Giorgos Karakostas (to Ethnikos Piraeus F.C.)
—	DF	VEN	Cesar Alberto Castro (free)
—	MF	PAR	Derlis David Meza Colli (loan return to Atromitos)
—	FW	GRE	Ilias Solakis (to Diagoras F.C.)
—	FW	GRE	Georgios Gougoulias (free)
—	MF	BRA	Luciano de Souza (to Skoda Xanthi)
—	MF	ARG	Lucas Roberto Rimoldi (free)
—	DF	GRE	Apostolos Avramidis (free)
—	GK	GRE	Athanasios Kouventaris (free)

=== Skoda Xanthi ===
In: Note: Flags indicate national team as defined under FIFA eligibility rules; some limited exceptions apply. Players may hold more than one non-FIFA nationality.

No.	Pos.	Nation	Player
2	DF	ARG	Juan Ramón Fernández (from Argentinos Juniors)
6	DF	GRE	Manolis Liapakis (from Thrasyvoulos)
8	MF	BRA	Luciano (from PAS Giannina)
20	FW	GRE	Georgios Vakouftsis (from Ergotelis F.C.)
22	DF	TOG	Karim Guédé (from Artmedia Petrzalka)
27	FW	POL	Marek Zieńczuk (from Wisła Kraków)
29	MF	SVK	Jaroslav Kolbas (on loan from Košice)
41	FW	SVK	Peter Štyvar (on loan from Bristol City)
66	MF	SVK	Zdeno Strba (from Žilina)
86	MF	CMR	Martin Abena (from Dunajská Streda)

Out: Note: Flags indicate national team as defined under FIFA eligibility rules; some limited exceptions apply. Players may hold more than one non-FIFA nationality.

No.	Pos.	Nation	Player
—	MF	ARG	Juan Pablo Avendaño (released free)
—	FW	GRE	Charilaos Pappas (to TSV 1860 München)
—	GK	POL	Paweł Linka (released free)
—	DF	FRA	Romain Ferrier (released free)
—	FW	CZE	Libor Došek (released free)
—	MF	CZE	Tomáš Abrahám (released free)
—	FW	NGA	Victor Agali (to Anorthosis)
—	MF	POL	Rafał Grzelak (on loan to Steaua)
—	MF	ANG	Francisco Zuela (to FC Kuban Krasnodar)

== See also ==
- List of Belgian football transfers summer 2009
- List of Bulgarian football transfers summer 2009
- List of Cypriot football transfers summer 2009
- List of Danish football transfers summer 2009
- List of Dutch football transfers summer 2009
- List of English football transfers summer 2009
- List of German football transfers summer 2009
- List of 2009–10 Israeli football transfers
- List of Italian football transfers summer 2009
- List of Maltese football transfers summer 2009
- List of Scottish football transfers 2009–10
- List of Serbian football transfers summer 2009
- List of Spanish football transfers summer 2009
- List of Ukrainian football transfers summer 2009
