= Emiljano Shehu =

Albanian footballer

Personal information
- Date of birth: 10 June 1998 (age 28)
- Place of birth: Chania, Crete, Greece
- Height: 1.91 m (6 ft 3 in)
- Position: Defender

Youth career
- –2014: Platanias

Senior career*
Years	Team	Apps	(Gls)
2014–2016	Platanias	1	(0)
2016–2017	Luftëtari	5	(0)
2016–2017	AEEK INKA	6	(0)
2017–2018	Kavala	14	(0)
2018–2019	Episkopi	20	(0)
2019–2021	Ierapetra	17	(2)
2021–2022	Almopos Aridea	35	(1)
2023–2024	Chania	8	(0)

International career^{‡}
2015	Albania U19	1	(0)
- * Club domestic league appearances and goals as of 16 April 2022 ‡ National team caps and goals as of 20 September 2016

Emiljano Shehu (born 10 June 1998) is an Albanian professional footballer who plays as a defender.

== Club career ==
=== Platanias ===
Shehu participated for the first time with Platanias first team on 24 September 2014 in a 2014–15 Greek Cup match against Serres where he managed to make his first senior debut playing as a starter in the 3–1 victory in which he substituted off in the 55th minute for Kostas Mendrinos.

== International career ==
Shehu was called up for the first time in international level at the Albania national under-19 football team by coach Altin Lala for the double Friendly match against Bosnia and Herzegovina U19 on 21 and 23 April 2015. He debuted for the Albania U19 on 21 April in a 3–0 loss.

== Career statistics ==
=== Club ===
As of 24 September 2014

Season	Club	League country	League		League Cup		Europe		Total	
Season	Club	League country	Apps	Goals	Apps	Goals	Apps	Goals	Apps	Goals
2014–15	Platanias	Super League Greece	0	0	1	0	-	-	1	0
Total			0	0	1	0	0	0	1	0
Career total			0	0	1	0	0	0	1	0
