= Evangelos Kontogoulidis =

Greek footballer

Personal information
- Date of birth: 13 July 1981 (age 45)
- Place of birth: Proastio, Kozani, Greece
- Height: 1.83 m (6 ft 0 in)
- Position: Striker

Senior career*
Years	Team	Apps	(Gls)
2003–2004	Eordaikos	0	(0)
2004–2006	Kozani	40	(12)
2006–2010	PAS Giannina	70	(29)
2010–2011	Trikala	29	(10)
2011–2013	Panthrakikos	37	(7)
2013–2014	Panachaiki	22	(8)
2014–2016	Acharnaikos	22	(8)
2016	AEK Chalkida		
- * Club domestic league appearances and goals as of 10 July 2014

Evangelos Kontogoulidis (Greek: Ευάγγελος Κοντογουλίδης; born 13 July 1981) is a Greek former professional footballer.

== Career ==
=== Kozani ===
Kontogoulidis scored nine goals for Kozani during the 2004–05 Gamma Ethniki season. He signed for PAS Giannina in January 2006.

=== PAS Giannina ===
Evangelos Kontogoulidis in PAS Giannina, played with the former flag striker Georgios Saitiotis. On 31 January 2007, Evangelos Kontogoulidis scored in the extra-time a goal from before a hostile crowd at Karaiskakis Stadium, PAS Giannina clinched a spot in the Greek Cup semi-finals. With an aggregate score of 3–2, PAS also became the first ever lower division club to eliminate Olympiacos from the Greek Cup tournament. In the season 2008/2009 Evangelos Kontogoulidis helped PAS Giannina to achieve the Super League Greece, allowing the epirus team to face teams like Olympiacos, Panathinaikos, PAOK, AEK Athens, Panionios. In the season 2009/2010 Evangelos Kontogoulidis with PAS Giannina reach the second Greek Cup semi-finals, knockout round of the Greek Cup against dell'Atromitos, team coached by Georgios Donis former flag of the team of Epirus. On 2 February 2010, the PAS Giannina at the Zosimades Stadium inflicts 4–0 to PAOK of Italians Bruno Cirillo, Mirko Savini and other players like Zisis Vryzas and Theodoros Zagorakis, that they have played in Italy. Where the European goalkeeper Kostas Chalkias, that won Euro 2004 with Greece, could not stop the Ianotes strikers and PAS Giannina will face Panathinaikos in the Greek Cup semi-final for the second time in the history of the club's main city of Ioannina.

=== Trikala ===
In the summer 2010, he moved for one year to Trikala in second division, here he made 31 appearances and 11 goal.

=== Panthrakikos ===
In the summer 2011, he moved for one year to Panthrakikos, still in second division, he helped the team to promote to the Super League. Here in the summer 2012, the club decide to put forward with him the striker Dimitrios Papadopoulos, who won Euro 2004 with Greece, in order to reinforce the attack to compete in Super League. On 16 December 2013, he scored a goal against Apollon Smyrnis to draw the result in the Greek Cup.

=== Panachaiki ===
In the summer 2013, he moved to Panachaiki.

Chalkidonikos A.C.

In October 2016, he moved to Chalkidonikos A.C.

== Honours ==
PAS Giannina

- Greek Second Division (1): 2009

Panthrakikos

- Greek Second Division (1): 2012
