= Thanopoulos (surname) =

Thanopoulos (Greek: Θανόπουλος) is a Greek surname.

== Notable people ==
Notable people with this surname include:

- Dimitrios Thanopoulos (born 1959), Greek wrestler
- Dimitris Thanopoulos (born 1987), Greek footballer
- Elefthérios Thanópoulos, racewalker who holds the Greek record for the 10,000-m track
