= Proasteio =

Proasteio or Proastio may refer to several places in Greece:

- Proastio, Karditsa, a town in the Karditsa regional unit
- Proastio, Kozani, a town in the Kozani regional unit
- Proastio, Messenia, a village in the municipal unit Lefktro, Messenia
- Proastio, Patras, a neighbourhood in the north of Patras, Achaea
