= Georgios Sikalias =

Greek footballer

Personal information
- Date of birth: 25 March 1986 (age 40)
- Place of birth: Athens, Greece
- Height: 1.87 m (6 ft 1 1/2 in)
- Position: Goalkeeper

Team information
- Current team: Aris Petroupolis

Youth career
- 1999–2004: Panathinaikos

Senior career*
Years	Team	Apps	(Gls)
2004–2008	Panathinaikos	0	(0)
2006–2007	→ Koropi (loan)	18	(0)
2007–2008	→ Ethnikos Piraeus (loan)	8	(0)
2008–2011	PAS Giannina	39	(0)
2011–2012	Panthrakikos	2	(0)
2012–2013	Iraklis Psachna	35	(0)
2013–2014	AEL	25	(0)
2014–2015	Chania	19	(0)
2014–2015	Trikala	6	(0)
2016	Karaiskakis	0	(0)
2016–2017	Doxa Drama	0	(0)
2017–2018	Ethnikos Piraeus	0	(0)
2018–2019	Platanias	0	(0)
2019	Diagoras	0	(0)
2019–2023	Egaleo	79	(0)
2023–	Aris Petroupolis		

International career^{‡}
2006	Greece U21	5	(0)
- * Club domestic league appearances and goals as of 16 June 2023 ‡ National team caps and goals as of 18 August 2013

Georgios Sikalias (Greek: Γεώργιος Σικαλιάς; born 25 March 1986) is a Greek professional footballer who plays as a goalkeeper.

== Honours ==
- PAS Giannina
  - Greek Second Division: 2009, 2011
