= Vitaliy Zheludok =

Belarusian footballer

Personal information
- Date of birth: 11 August 1986 (age 40)
- Place of birth: Minsk, Belarusian SSR
- Height: 1.88 m (6 ft 2 in)
- Position: Goalkeeper

Youth career
- 2004–2005: Darida Minsk Raion

Senior career*
Years	Team	Apps	(Gls)
2006	Osipovichi	17	(0)
2007	Kommunalnik Slonim	4	(0)
2008–2011	Minsk	3	(0)
2010	→ Vedrich-97 Rechitsa (loan)	20	(0)
2012–2014	Platanias	2	(0)
2014	→ PAO Krousonas (loan)	18	(0)
2014	Slutsk	0	(0)
2015	Lida	27	(0)
2016	Oshmyany	8	(0)
- * Club domestic league appearances and goals as of 27 December 2016

Vitaliy Zheludok (Belarusian: Вiталь Жалудок; Russian: Виталий Желудок; born 11 August 1986) is a Belarusian former professional footballer.

== Career ==
On 20 February 2018, the BFF banned him from football for life for his involvement in the match-fixing.
