= Esteban Buján =

Argentine footballer (born 1979)

Personal information
- Date of birth: July 13, 1979 (age 47)
- Place of birth: Capital Federal, Argentina
- Height: 1.76 m (5 ft 9 1/2 in)
- Position: Midfielder

Senior career*
Years	Team	Apps	(Gls)
1998–2004	Vélez Sársfield	86	(4)
2004–2005	Banfield	30	(2)
2005–2006	Independiente	13	(0)
2006–2007	Godoy Cruz	26	(0)
2007	Banfield	9	(0)
2008	Albacete	5	(0)
2008–2011	PAS Giannina F.C.	23	(1)
2011–2012	Ferro Carril Oeste	21	(0)
- * Club domestic league appearances and goals

Esteban Buján (born July 13, 1979) is an Argentine footballer.
