= Platanias F.C. =

Greek association football club

Platanias
- Full name: Αθλητικός Όμιλος Πλατανιά Χανίων; Athlitikós Ómilos Plataniá Chaníon (Athletic Club of Platanias Chania)
- Nickname: Red Trifolium
- Founded: 15 March 1931; 95 years ago
- Ground: Perivolia Municipal Stadium, Chania, Greece
- Capacity: 4,527
- Chairman: Giannis Douniadakis
- Manager: Theodosis Theodosiadis
- League: Gamma Ethniki
- 2025–26: Chania FCA First Division, 2nd (Promoted)
Home colours	Away colours

Platanias Football Club (Greek: Π.Α.Ε. Πλατανιάς Χανίων) is a Greek professional football club based in Platanias, Chania, Crete. The club hosted its home games at the Maleme ground and at the Perivolia Municipal Stadium (during the Super League period). Platanias was the first, and to this day only club to have represented Chania in the Super League, playing for six seasons between 2012 and 2018. Their colors are red and white.

== History ==
=== Formation and recent years ===
The association was founded in 1931 by Antonis Varouxakis.

In 1942–43, AO Platanias struggled in the final Cup against the traditional rivals Talos but having significant absences, such as Galanis, who brought a gun wound in the abdomen.

Although Platanias lost the match, the final had a special importance because of the shirts of the players. The jerseys were made from Nazi flags that had been stolen from the warehouses of the Germans, and residents had turned into the athletic apparel seamstresses in the village. From this fact was introduced the red on the jerseys of the team. With the same jerseys, the team competed even against football teams of German soldiers.

In 1945, the team languished due to heavy immigration and the civil war that caused many players to leave their homeland.

In 1958, the club was reestablished by Manolis Mathioulakis and first president Emmanuel Kallitsakis playing at local third category.

Then Platanias became a member of the Union of Football Associations of Chania and from the first year climbed category, where it remained until 1969.

In 1970, they played for the first time in the first "local category".

In 1971 Platanias had another important game against the Renaissance Chania (today Ionia), but because of the political situation of the time, the team was punished and remained inactive until 1975.

After the restoration in 1975, Platanias was reestablished, struggling to C local class, where they remained for two years and then went to B', where they played another two years before to play in the A category.

From 1980 begins the rise of Platanias, who participated in the National Amateur Championships (equivalent to the existing C "National") contestant in Greece.

After their first two matches, the team demoted and then took a radical renewal, with footballers inhabitants of Platanias.

In 1985, they moved category (D "National"), but relegated the same year. For three years they fought in the First local championship Chania.

In 1989, they went to the Fourth National class for two periods.

In 1993, after relegation, struggled for a year in the Regional Championship and won. After relegation in 2002 they fought in the local league.

Between 2002 and the period from 2008 to 2009, they played in the Crete Regional Championship having a starring role collecting 305 points in total.

The best, by then, football year in the history of Platanias, was the 2008–09 and after a stunning season champion emerging regional championship.

=== The road to the top ===
In 2009–10 season, the team fought for first time entry to Gamma Ethniki and managed, after a long effort, to remain in this class. Specifically, Platanias won 38 points in all 34 games, finishing in 12th position in the league.

The next year 2010–11 Football League 2 Platanias had excellent performances and managed to finish in 5th place but gained promotion due to the Koriopolis scandal, when many teams were relegated from the Football League.

The period 2011–12 at the Football League started with the best conditions for Platanias, who managed to stand out from the beginning and even won the title of "champion of winter." The last day found Platanias in fifth in the standings with 60 points, while promotion play-offs of the 2011–12 Football League the team made excellent appearances against Kallithea, AEL Kalloni and Panachaiki to take first place and ascend, to the 2012–13 Super League, for the first time in their history, but also more generally in the history of the Chania region football.

=== Six seasons in the Super League ===
In their first season in the Super League, Platanias finished in 9th place with 36 points. They beat historically powerful teams such as Panathinaikos with 2 wins home & away (totally 3 with a Greek Cup win), AEK with 1 home win & Aris with 2 wins home & away. Their biggest impact of this season, was eliminating Panathinaikos in the Fourth Round of the Greek Cup in a two-legged match.

The team's best performance was finishing 7th in the 2016-17 Super League season, however, the following year 2017-18 Platanias finished last and were then relegated to the second division.

=== Dissolution and Re-establishment ===
Due to several reasons, with the most important being relegation, Platanias announced bankruptcy and went dissolved in 2020. The club was revived after 3 years and played for the Chania FCA 3rd Division, were they were promoted to the Chania FCA 2nd division instantly.

Between 2023 and 2025, the club achieved two consecutive promotions: from the Third Division to the Second Division in the 2023–24 season, followed by promotion from the Second to the First Division in the 2024–25 campaign.

In the 2025–26 season, the team finished in 2nd place in the Chania FCA First Division, securing its return to the Gamma Ethniki after a 5-year absence. This marked the club's third consecutive promotion in three years.

== Crest ==
Platanias' crest is a red trifolium, probably from a designer's mistake who instead of a platanus foil, he designed a simple trefoil. The name of the village "Platanias" means "area of Platanus".

== Facilities ==
=== Platanias & Maleme Municipal Grounds ===
The municipal ground of Platanias, built in 1959, was built by the same residents who were using hoes to dig the field with donkeys carrying soil used to fill the field. However, at that time an employee and resident of Platanias, Kostas Tsigounakis, volunteered to help build the stadium using a machine – loader base. Today, Platanias FC uses Maleme sports ground (in the Municipality of Platanias) and previously Perivolia Municipal Stadium (Municipality of Chania) during the Super League period. The ground of Platanias, which was located within the village, was demolished in 2023 to make way for a playground.

The municipal ground of Maleme is land granted by the Greek Air Force in Platanias, who built the stadium with natural grass. Platanias FC played at this ground until the 2011–12 period, and returned again after its relegation from the Super League in 2018.

=== Perivolia Municipal Stadium ===
From the season 2012–13 until 2017-2018, Platanias FC competed at the Perivolia Municipal Stadium of Chania, which took place in record time, extensive upgrading and modernization work at all levels to meet in full all the obligations set by the organizing principle of Super League and NOVA TV. The Municipal Ground of Perivolia has now "morphed" into a modern football stadium, with two tiers (one of them covered), journalists theories, changing rooms for athletes and referees (female assistants are separate changing rooms), dispensary, gym, office for the observer of the match, room for press conferences and other venues.

== Club sponsors ==
Season	Kit manufacturer	Shirt sponsor
2010–11	Macron	Lotto
2011–12	Macron	OPAP
2012–13	Macron	Tzoker
2013–14	Macron	Tzoker
2014–15	Macron	Tzoker
2015–16	Macron	Stoiximan.gr
2016–17	Macron	Pame Stoixima
2017–18	Luanvi	ErgoBeton
2018–19	Luanvi	ErgoBeton
2019–21	Acerbis	ErgoBeton
2026–27	Acerbis	Goody's Burger House

== Honours ==
=== Domestic ===
==== Leagues ====
- Delta Ethniki
  - Winners (1): 2008–09
- Chania FCA First Division
  - Winners (4): 1981, 1985, 1989, 1993

==== Cups ====
- Chania FCA Cup
  - Winners (8): 1987, 1990, 1994, 2003, 2006, 2009, 2017, 2026
- Greek Cup:
  - Quarter Finals (2): 2012–13, 2016–17

== League performance ==
Season	League	Pos.	Pl.	W	D	L	GS	GA	Pts
2008–09	Delta Ethniki	1	30	19	7	4	61	15	66
2009–10	Football League 2	12	32	10	9	13	32	36	39
2010–11	Football League 2	5	30	14	7	8	42	23	52
2011–12	Football League	5	34	17	9	8	41	20	60
2012–13	Super League	9	30	10	6	14	29	42	36
2013–14	Super League	14	34	10	8	16	39	48	38
2014–15	Super League	9	34	12	8	14	32	30	44
2015–16	Super League	9	30	10	9	11	32	30	39
2016–17	Super League	7	30	11	9	10	34	38	42
2017–18	Super League	16	30	2	4	24	14	65	10
2018–19	Football League	2	30	15	10	5	53	22	55
2019–20	Super League 2	9	20	8	2	10	26	32	26
2020–21	Gamma Ethniki	15	15	1	2	12	8	29	5

Pos. = Position; Pl = Match played; W = Win; D = Draw; L = Lost; GS = Goal scored; GA = Goal against; Pts = Points
Colors: Gold = winner; Green = promoted; Red = relegated.

== Professional history ==
- 6 seasons in the First Division
- 3 season in the Second Division
- 4 seasons in the Third Division
- 7 seasons in the Fourth Division

== Statistics ==
=== Most appearances in professional divisions ===
Player	Matches
(Greece) Kostas Mendrinos	91
(Greece) Fanouris Goundoulakis	91
(Cameroon) Yaya Banana	90
(Spain) Juan Aguilera	89
(Greece) Thomas Nazlidis	86

=== Top-scoring players in professional divisions ===
Player	Goals
(Greece) Thomas Nazlidis	23
(Greece) Giannis Loukinas	22
(Brazil) Miguel Bianconi	22
(Greece) Nikos Katsikokeris	19
(Spain) David Torres	18

== Notable former players ==
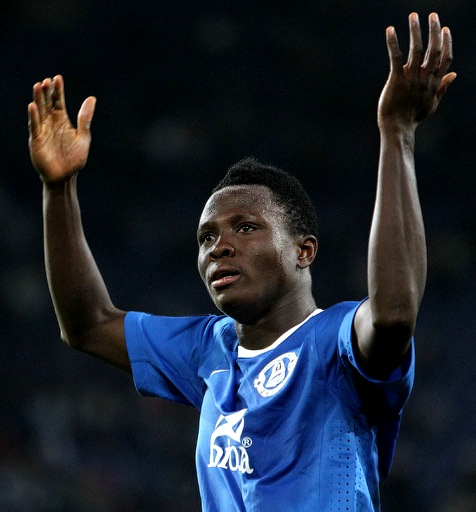
Samuel Inkoom

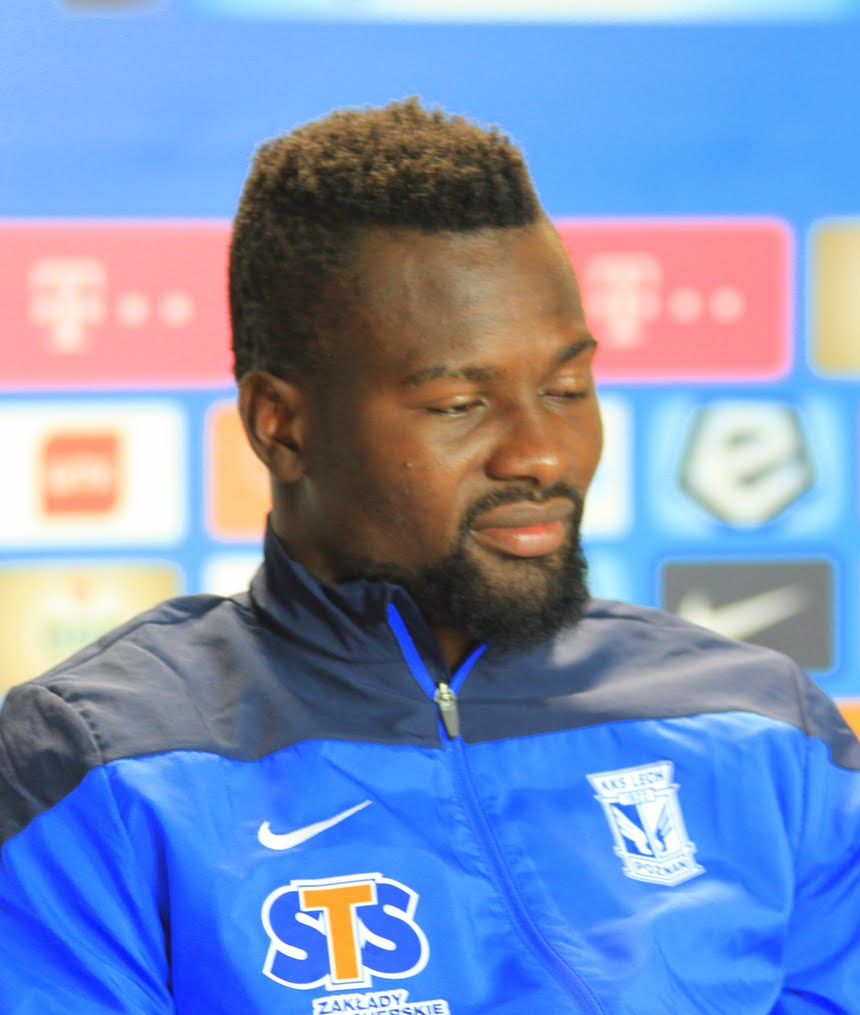
Aziz Tetteh

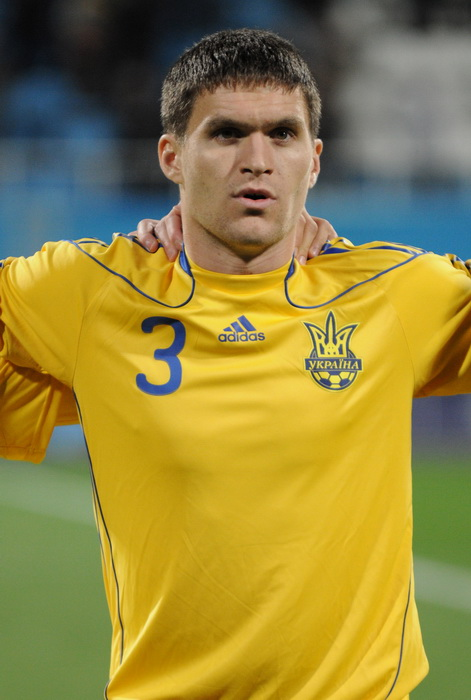
Yevhen Selin

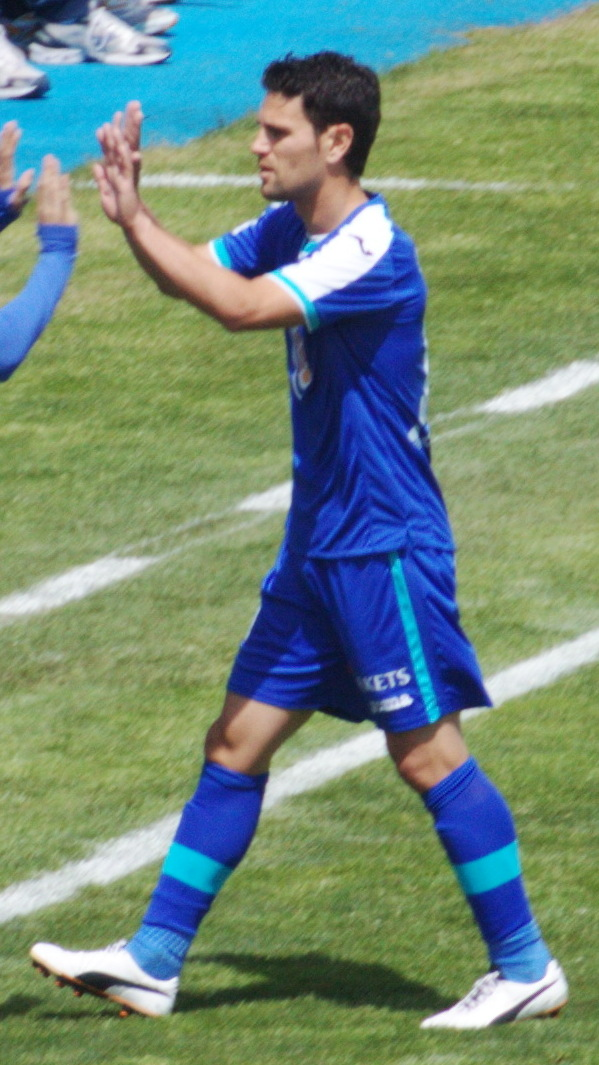
Jaime Gavilán

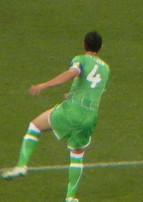
Antar Yahia

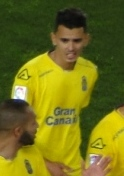
Francisco Nili

Albania

- (Albania) Arber Dhrami
- (Albania) (Greece) Emiljano Shehu
- (Albania) (Greece) Vasil Shkurti
- (Albania) (Greece) Enea Gaqollari
- (Albania) (Greece) Diljan Bodouri
- (Albania) (Greece) Renato Ziko
- (Albania) (Greece) Kevin Cela
- (Albania) (Greece) Franko Lamce
- (Albania) (Greece) Kostika Tajari
- (Albania) (Greece) Adrian Imeri
- (Albania) (Greece) Oresti Batzio
- (Albania) Irdis Merolli
- (Albania) Adnan Shkurtaj
- (Albania) Alexandros Ndoi
- (Albania) (Greece) Christos Giousis

Algeria

- (Algeria) (France) Antar Yahia

Argentina

- (Argentina) (Italy) Gastón González
- (Argentina) (Italy) Juan Munafo
- (Argentina) (Italy) Fabricio Poci
- (Argentina) Leonardo Ramos

Australia

- (Australia) (Greece) Apostolos Giannou
- (Australia) (Greece) Felix Dimitrakis

Austria

- (Austria) Michael Gspurning

Belarus

- (Belarus) Mikalay Signevich
- (Belarus) Vitali Zhaludok

Bosnia and Herzegovina

- (Bosnia and Herzegovina) Haris Dilaver
- (Bosnia and Herzegovina) (Croatia) Ognjen Gnjatić

Brazil

- (Brazil) Cássio
- (Brazil) Gilvan Gomes
- (Brazil) Marcelo Labarthe
- (Brazil) (Italy) Miguel Bianconi
- (Brazil) (Italy) Tárik
- (Brazil) (Italy) Vanderson Scardovelli
- (Brazil) Gott
- (Brazil) Matheus Leiria

Bulgaria

- (Bulgaria) (Nigeria) Chigozie Udoji

Cameroon

- (Cameroon) Banana Yaya
- (Cameroon) (Equatorial Guinea) Viera Ellong

Chad

- (Chad) (France) Azrack Mahamat

Croatia

- (Croatia) (Serbia) Igor Mirčeta

Cyprus

- (Cyprus) Antonis Georgallides

Czech Republic

- (Czech Republic) (Greece) Marios Pourzitidis

Congo

- (Republic of the Congo) (France) Clévid Dikamona

DR Congo

- (Democratic Republic of the Congo) (France) Bernand Itoua
- (Democratic Republic of the Congo) (Greece) Markos Maragoudakis
- (Democratic Republic of the Congo) (France) Clarck N'Sikulu

England

- (England) (Angola) Walter Figueira

Equatorial Guinea

- (Equatorial Guinea) (Liberia) Lawrence Doe

France

- (France) Pierrick Cros
- (France) (Madagascar) (Martinique) Mickaël Malsa
- (France) (Germany) David Oberhauser
- (France) (Martinique) Kevin Olimpa
- (France) (Greece) Mathias Dimizas

Germany

- (Germany) (Greece) Christos Karakitsos
- (Germany) (Greece) Giorgos Machlelis
- (Germany) (Greece) Stefanos Papoutsogiannopoulos
- (Germany) (Greece) Athanasios Tsourakis
- (Germany) (Greece) Panagiotis Vlachodimos

Ghana

- (Ghana) Samuel Inkoom
- (Ghana) Aziz Tetteh

Greece

- (Greece) Ilias Anastasakos
- (Greece) Vasilis Angelopoulos
- (Greece) Alexandros Apostolopoulos
- (Greece) Leonidas Argyropoulos
- (Greece) Tasos Dentsas
- (Greece) (Albania) Alkis Dimitris
- (Greece) (Albania) Elini Dimoutsos
- (Greece) Thanasis Dinas
- (Greece) Giorgos Giakoumakis
- (Greece) Fanouris Goundoulakis
- (Greece) Antonis Iliadis
- (Greece) Christos Intzidis
- (Greece) Petros Kanakoudis
- (Greece) Giannis Kargas
- (Greece) Christos Karipidis
- (Greece) Nikolaos Katsikokeris
- (Greece) Konstantinos Kaznaferis
- (Greece) Fotis Kipouros
- (Greece) Evgenios Kitsas
- (Greece) Nikos Korovesis
- (Greece) Kostas Kourtesiotis
- (Greece) Giorgos Lazaridis
- (Greece) Giannis Liourdis
- (Greece) Giorgos Manousos
- (Greece) Stelios Marangos
- (Greece) Kostas Mendrinos
- (Greece) Thomas Nazlidis
- (Greece) Konstantinos Pangalos
- (Greece) Manolis Patralis
- (Greece) Kostas Peristeridis
- (Greece) Antonis Petropoulos
- (Greece) Vasileios Pliatsikas
- (Greece) Ioannis Potouridis
- (Greece) Dimitris Raptakis
- (Greece) Dimitris Sialmas
- (Greece) Manolis Siopis
- (Greece) Dimitris Stamou
- (Greece) Giannis Stathis
- (Greece) Lazaros Theodorelis
- (Greece) Giorgos Valerianos
- (Greece) Giannis Zaradoukas

India

- (India) (Greece) Gurjinder Singh

Liberia

- (Liberia) Herron Berrian

Lithuania

- (Lithuania) Darius Zutautas

Malawi

- (Malawi) Tawonga Chimodzi

Mali

- (Mali) (France) Ousmane Coulibaly

Montenegro

- (Montenegro) (Serbia) Filip Kasalica

Netherlands

- (Netherlands) (Curaçao) Doriano Kortstam
- (Netherlands) (Curaçao) Yaël Eisden

Nigeria

- (Nigeria) (Portugal) Chidi Onyemah

Palestine

- (Palestine) (Greece) Saado Abdel Salam Fouflia

Poland

- (Poland) Piotr Grzelczak

Portugal

- (Portugal) Emídio Rafael
- (Portugal) Vasco Faísca
- (Portugal) (Guinea-Bissau) Vasco Fernandes

Romania

- (Romania) Vladimir Nicoara

Serbia

- (Serbia) Nikola Beljić
- (Serbia) Željko Kalajdžić
- (Serbia) Aleksandar Katai
- (Serbia) Filip Kljajić
- (Serbia) (Bosnia and Herzegovina) Milivoje Lazic
- (Serbia) Luka Milunović
- (Serbia) (Greece) Dimitris Popovic
- (Serbia) Filip Stanisavljević
- (Serbia) Miloš Stojčev

Spain

- (Spain) Juan Aguilera
- (Spain) Igor Angulo
- (Spain) Cristian Castells
- (Spain) David Cerra
- (Spain) Didac Devesa
- (Spain) Jaime Gavilan
- (Spain) Raúl Llorente
- (Spain) Toni Moral
- (Spain) Mario Martínez
- (Spain) Nili
- (Spain) David Torres

Switzerland

- (Switzerland) Fabian Stoller

Syria

- (Syria) (Greece) Abdul Rahman Oues

Turkey

- (Turkey) (France) Kendal Ucar

Ukraine

- (Ukraine) Yevhen Budnik
- (Ukraine) (Greece) Evgeniy Kononenko
- (Ukraine) Renat Mochulyak
- (Ukraine) Yevhen Neplyakh
- (Ukraine) Vitaliy Pryndeta
- (Ukraine) Yevhen Selin
- (Ukraine) Vadym Shevchuk

Venezuela

- (Venezuela) (Spain) Ruben Arocha
- (Venezuela) (Spain) Andrés Sampredo

== Managerial history ==
- (Greece) Christos Vasileiou (2009 – 25 Oct 2009)
- (Serbia) Miodrag Ćirković (30 Oct 2009 – Sept 29, 2010)
- (Greece) Timos Kavakas (Sept 29, 2010 – 6 July 2011)
- (Greece) Andreas Pantziaras (6 July 2011 – 19 Oct 2011)
- (Greece) Timos Kavakas (24 Oct 2011 – 20 March 2012)
- (Greece) Giannis Chatzinikolaou (29 March 2012 – 19 Nov 2012)
- (Greece) Angelos Anastasiadis (20 Nov 2012 – 23 May 2013)
- (Greece) Marinos Ouzounidis (28 May 2013 – 4 Nov 2013)
- (Greece) Nikos Anastopoulos (6 Nov 2013 – 8 Feb 2014)
- (Greece) Angelos Anastasiadis (9 Feb 2014 – 18 May 2014)
- (Greece) Giannis Christopoulos (23 May 2014 – 11 March 2015)
- (Greece) Giannis Thomaidis (11 March 2015 – 16 March 2015)
- (Greece) Georgios Paraschos (16 March 2015 – 31 October 2017)
- (Spain) José Manuel Roca (12 Nov 2017 – 29 Jan 2018)
- (Greece) Giannis Chatzinikolaou (31 Jan 2018 – 30 Jun 2018)
- (Brazil) Paulo Campos (18 July 2018 – 8 Oct 2018)
