= Georgios Kousas =

Greek footballer

Personal information
- Date of birth: 12 August 1982 (age 44)
- Place of birth: Thessaloniki, Greece
- Height: 1.86 m (6 ft 1 in)
- Position: Centre back

Youth career
- –2000: Aris

Senior career*
Years	Team	Apps	(Gls)
2000–2004	Aris	46	(4)
2005	Apollon Kalamarias	8	(0)
2005–2010	PAS Giannina	117	(9)
2010–2017	Panetolikos	210	(10)
2017	AEL	2	(0)
2018	Aris Limassol	6	(1)
2018–2019	Iraklis	6	(0)
2020–2021	Tilikratis		

International career
2003–2004	Greece U21	6	(0)
- * Club domestic league appearances and goals as of 12:16, 25 December 2018 (UTC)

Georgios Kousas (Greek: Γεώργιος Κούσας; born 12 August 1982) is a Greek footballer who plays as a centre back.

== Career ==
Kousas began his playing career by signing with Aris in July 2000.
