= Fernando Machado (footballer) =

Uruguayan footballer (born 1979)

Personal information
- Full name: Luis Fernando Machado Pinto
- Date of birth: September 26, 1979 (age 47)
- Place of birth: Montevideo, Uruguay
- Height: 1.84 m (6 ft 0 in)
- Position: Centre back

Team information
- Current team: (assistant)

Senior career*
Years	Team	Apps	(Gls)
1996–1998	Montevideo Wanderers	5	(1)
1999	Pumas UNAM	24	(1)
2000–2001	Montevideo Wanderers	21	(0)
2002	Atlético Celaya		
2002–2005	Nacional		
2006	San Luis		
2006	Cerrito		
2007–2008	Asteras Tripolis		
2008–2010	Levadiakos	25	(0)
2010–2011	Gimnasia de Jujuy	24	(2)
2011–2012	Blooming	1	(0)
2012	Fénix de Montevideo	0	(0)
2013	Montevideo Wanderers	7	(0)
2013–2014	Fénix de Montevideo	8	(0)
2014–2016	Juventud	34	(2)

International career
	Uruguay U20	0	(0)

Managerial career
- 2016–2017: Nacional (reserves assistant)
- 2018: Nacional (assistant)
- 2019–2021: Talleres (assistant)
- 2024-2025: Talleres (assistant)
- * Club domestic league appearances and goals

Luis Fernando Machado Pinto (born September 26, 1979) is an Uruguayan retired footballer.

== Career ==
Machado played for 11 clubs in 5 different countries along his football career. His former teams include Montevideo Wanderers, Nacional, Cerrito and Fénix de Montevideo in his home country, Asteras Tripolis and Levadiakos F.C. from Greece, Pumas UNAM, Atlético Celaya and San Luis F.C. in Mexico, Gimnasia de Jujuy in the Argentine Primera División, as well as Bolivian side Blooming.

== Coaching career ==
In July 2016 it was announced, that Machado had decided to retire. He began his coaching career at his former club, Club Nacional de Football, as assistant manager of the club's reserve team with his former teammate, Alexander Medina, as manager. In December 2017 it was confirmed, that the duo would take charge of the club's first team. They left the club at the end of the year.

In June 2019 it was confirmed, that Medina had become manager of Talleres, once again with Machado as his assistant.
