= Salim Arrache =

Algerian footballer (born 1982)

Personal information
- Full name: Salim M'Hamed Arrache
- Date of birth: 14 July 1982 (age 44)
- Place of birth: Marseille, France
- Height: 1.87 m (6 ft 2 in)
- Position: Left winger

Youth career
- 1999–2001: Marignane
- 2001–2003: Strasbourg

Senior career*
Years	Team	Apps	(Gls)
2003–2006	Strasbourg	58	(15)
2007–2009	Marseille	12	(0)
2008	→ Toulouse (loan)	16	(0)
2008–2009	→ Reims (loan)	16	(2)
2009	Bastia	13	(0)
2010	PAS Giannina	4	(1)
2010–2011	Asteras Tripolis	17	(1)
2013–2014	Ajaccio	7	(2)
2014	Chengdu Tiancheng	10	(1)
2015	AEL Kalloni	2	(0)
2020	SC La Cayolle		
Total		155	(22)

International career
2003–2008	Algeria	13	(1)
- * Club domestic league appearances and goals

Salim M'Hamed Arrache (born 14 July 1982) is a former professional footballer who played as a left winger. Born in France, he represented Algeria at international level.

== Early years ==
Born in Marseille, France, to parents from Béjaïa (north-eastern Algeria), Arrache began to play for the local club of his neighborhood, the Batarelle, Northern Marseille in 1995.

== Career ==
On 20 July 2009, Arrache left Olympique de Marseille after both sides reached a mutual agreement to terminate his contract.

He signed a one-year contract with SC Bastia shortly after. On 4 December 2009, Bastia announced they have reached a mutual agreement to end Arrache's contract, four months after his arrival.

On 6 June 2011, Arrache signed a one-year contract with Kuwaiti side Qadsia SC. On 9 August 2011, however, the club terminated his contract after he failed to impress the coach in pre-season friendlies.

On 25 July 2012, he participated in a trial match for the Western Sydney Wanderers. This match was the first ever match the new club played, but Arrache was passed over and did not stay with the club after this match.

On 2 February 2013, he reportedly went for a trial to the Malaysian-based club, Kelantan FA.

In February 2014, after seven months back in France with AC Ajaccio, Arrache's contract was terminated on a mutual agreement, allowing him to sign a new contract in China with Chengdu Tiancheng.

Nearly five years after retiring, Arrache played for French amateur club, SC La Cayolle, in 2020.

== Career statistics ==
Algeria national team
Year	Apps	Goals
2004	8	1
2005	3	0
2006	0	0
2007	1	0
2008	1	0
Total	13	1

== Honours ==
Strasbourg

- Coupe de la Ligue: 2005
