= Konstantinos Kaznaferis =

Greek footballer (born in 1987)

Personal information
- Date of birth: 22 June 1987 (age 39)
- Place of birth: Arta, Greece
- Height: 1.78 m (5 ft 10 in)
- Position: Midfielder

Senior career*
Years	Team	Apps	(Gls)
2004–2006	Anagennisi Arta	29	(1)
2006–2010	PAS Giannina	47	(2)
2009	→ Pyrsos Grevena (loan)	13	(0)
2010–2013	Aris	55	(0)
2013–2014	Lokomotiv Plovdiv	9	(0)
2014	Platanias	9	(0)
2014–2015	Ergotelis	23	(0)
2015–2016	Aris	4	(0)
2016–2018	Panegialios	39	(0)
2018–2019	Iraklis	13	(0)
2019	Almopos Aridaea		
2020	Anagennisi Arta		
2020–2021	Sportfreunde 04	6	(1)
- * Club domestic league appearances and goals

Konstantinos Kaznaferis (Greek: Κωνσταντίνος Καζναφέρης; born 22 June 1987) is a Greek former professional footballer who played as a midfielder.

Kaznaferis began his playing career by signing with Anagennisi Arta in 2004.

== Career ==
=== Angennisi Arta ===
Kaznaferis began his professional career in Anagennisi Artas. He played in his birthplace team from 2004 to 2006. In this 2 years, Kostas appeared in 29 matches and scored one goal. His appearances with Anagennisi were enough to pull interesting by many teams in Greece.

=== PAS Giannina ===
Kaznaferis has two spells with PAS Giannina. In his first one, he played in Ajax of Epirus by 2006 to 2008. His appearances with PAS Giannina made him one of the biggest talents of Epirus. In his first spell, Kostas made 39 appearances, he scored 1 goal and he made a lot of assists. In his second spell to PAS Giannina (2009–2010), Kaznaferis continued great performances and big teams were looking him. In this spell, he made about 10 appearances and scored 1 goal.

==== Pyrsos Grevenon (loan) ====
In 2009-2010 first half of season, Kaznaferis went on loan to Pyrsos Grevena, a team in Greek Gamma Ethniki. He made 13 appearances without scoring, and he never persuaded Pyrsos for signing him. As a result, he returned quickly to PAS Giannina.

=== Aris ===
Kaznaferis gained recognition in the summer of 2010 when Aris, one of the major football clubs in Greece, signed him. During his first season in Thessaloniki, he was used in multiple positions and had limited impact on the field. The 2011–2012 season was considered the peak of Kaznaferis's career, as he became the first-choice right back for Aris, consistently delivering strong performances and earning recognition for his dedication and intensity.

=== Lokomotiv Plovdiv ===
Kaznaferis continued his career at Lokomotiv Plovdiv. It is important to mention that the Bulgarian team coach was Hristo Bonev, who had a remarkable career in the Super League Greece for AEK Athens, besides the fact that he served as a coach of Panathinaikos, AEL and Ionikos. He made his debut at 26 September in an away loss against Lovech.

=== Platanias ===
Kaznaferis did not manage to incorporate to his environment, therefore he initially managed to return to his previous club Aris, but due to financial and administrative problems, he finally decided to join Platanias. As a consequence, he returned to Super League and he made his debut with his new club on 20 January 2014, in a 2–0 home loss against OFI.

=== Ergotelis ===
Kaznaferis signed a contract with fellow Cretan Super League club Ergotelis on 28 July 2014. He made a total of 23 appearances for the club in the season.

=== Aris ===
On 13 September 2015, Kaznaferis returned to Aris.

=== Later career ===
On 19 September 2019, Kaznaferis joined Almopos Aridaea. In January 2020, Kaznaferis returned to Anagennisi Arta.
