= Konstantinos Andriolas =

Greek footballer (born 1985)

Personal information
- Full name: Konstantinos Andriolas
- Date of birth: 1 May 1985 (age 41)
- Place of birth: Athens, Greece
- Height: 1.89 m (6 ft 2 1/2 in)
- Position: Goalkeeper

Team information
- Current team: Aspropyrgos F.C.

Senior career*
Years	Team	Apps	(Gls)
2003–2005	Chalkidona	6	(0)
2005–2008	Atromitos	4	(0)
2008–2010	Panionios	11	(0)
2010–2011	Panthrakikos	7	(0)
2011–2012	Thrasyvoulos	2	(0)
2012-2021	Glyfada	1	(0)
2022-2023	Enosi Aspropirgou		
2023-	Haidari F.C.		

International career^{‡}
2004–2006	Greece U-21	6	(0)
- * Club domestic league appearances and goals as of 30 July 2010 ‡ National team caps and goals as of 30 July 2010

Konstantinos Andriolas (Greek: Κωνσταντίνος Ανδριόλας; born 1 May 1985) is a Greek footballer currently playing for Aspropyrgos F.C.

== Career ==
=== Senior career ===
His career started in the Super League Greece as a footballer (goalkeeper) in Chalkidona. After the merging of Atromitos with Chalkidona he continues as player of Atromitos from 2005 to 2008. The young goalkeeper contract agreement with Panionios for the period 2008–2010. In June 2010, Andriolas signed a 2-year contract with Panthrakikos.

=== Career statistics ===
season	club	league	Championship		Nation cup		Europe cup		Total	
season	club	league	appear	goals	appear	goals	appear	goals	appear	goals
2003–04	Chalkidona	Super League	1	0	0	0	0	0	1	0
2004–05	Chalkidona	Super League	5	0	0	0	0	0	5	0
2005–06	Atromitos	Super League	1	0	0	0	0	0	1	0
2006–07	Atromitos	Super League	3	0	0	0	0	0	3	0
2007–08	Atromitos	Super League	0	0	0	0	0	0	0	0
2008–09	Panionios	Super League	2	0	0	0	0	0	2	0
2009–10	Panionios	Super League	9	0	2	0	0	0	11	0
2010–11	Panthrakikos	Beta Ethniki	0	0	0	0	0	0	0	0
career total			21	0	2	0	0	0	23	0

Last update: 30 July 2010

== Greece U-21 ==
Andriolas, during 2004–2006 period participated for the Greece U-21 in 6 games:

- 5 May 2004 Greece-Ukraine 1–2
- 19 May 2004 Greece-Cyprus 0–1
- 17 August 2005 Belgium-Greece 0–1
- 6 September 2005 Kazakhstan-Greece 1–2
- 11 October 2005 Greece-Georgia 3–0
- 6 September 2006 Belgium-Greece 2–1
