= Giannis Stathis =

Greek footballer

Personal information
- Full name: Ioannis Stathis
- Date of birth: 20 May 1987 (age 39)
- Place of birth: Athens, Greece
- Height: 1.73 m (5 ft 8 in)
- Position: Right-back

Youth career
- –2005: Panathinaikos

Senior career*
Years	Team	Apps	(Gls)
2005–2008	Panathinaikos	0	(0)
2006–2007	→ Panachaiki (loan)		
2007	→ Apollon Kalamarias (loan)	5	(0)
2008	→ Ilisiakos (loan)	16	(0)
2008–2011	PAS Giannina	27	(0)
2011–2013	Panthrakikos	30	(0)
2013–2015	OFI	33	(0)
2015–2016	Levadiakos	34	(0)
2016–2017	Platanias	39	(0)
2017–2019	Apollon Smyrnis	37	(0)
2020	Egaleo	5	(0)
2020–2022	Xanthi	7	(0)
- * Club domestic league appearances and goals as of 17 February 2021

Giannis Stathis (Greek: Γιάννης Στάθης; born 20 May 1987) is a Greek former professional footballer who played as a right-back.

== Career ==
Stathis previously played in the Super League Greece, while out on loan to Apollon Kalamarias during the 2007–08 season.

== Honours ==
PAS Giannina

- Greek Second Division: 2009, 2011
