= Georgios Saitiotis =

Greek footballer

Personal information
- Date of birth: 25 July 1981 (age 45)
- Place of birth: Chalkidiki, Greece
- Height: 1.77 m (5 ft 9 1/2 in)
- Position: Striker

Senior career*
Years	Team	Apps	(Gls)
1999–2001	Neapoli	30	(7)
2001–2002	Kassandra	23	(6)
2002–2003	Skoda Xanthi	6	(0)
2002–2003	Kassandra	15	(5)
2003–2004	Skoda Xanthi	4	(2)
2004–2005	→ Olympiacos Volos (loan)	28	(14)
2005–2006	→ Niki Volos (loan)	30	(13)
2006–2010	PAS Giannina	120	(56)
2010–2011	Veria	27	(10)
2011–2012	AEL	11	(2)
2018	Moudania	1	(2)
Total		295	(117)
- * Club domestic league appearances and goals as of 21:13, 24 July 2015 (UTC)

Georgios Saitiotis (Greek: Γεώργιος Σαϊτιώτης; born 25 July 1981) is a Greek former professional footballer who played as a striker.

== Career ==
=== Olympiacos Volos ===
In the 2004–2005 season he moved on loan to Olympiacos Volos in Beta Ethniki

=== Niki Volos ===
In the 2005–2006 season he played on loan for Niki Volos.

=== PAS Giannina ===
In summer 2006, Saitiotis signed a contract with PAS Giannina in the second division. He made 31 appearances and scored 18 goals in his first year. PAS reached in the semi-finals of the Greek Cup. He made 6 appearances and scored 4 goals. He scored twice against Egaleo. His free kick against Iraklis allowed PAS to draw 1–1 in Thessaloniki. Also he scored against Iraklis at home, in Zosimades Stadium.

The following season, 2007–08 he made 31 appearances and scored 12 goals. In the season 2008–2009 he made 33 appearances and scored 20 goals contributing to the promotion of PAS Giannina in Super League Greece. In the season 2009–10 he made 25 appearances and scored 6 goals. He reached 56 goals, becoming the fourth-best scorer in club history, behind Edouardos Kontogeorgakis, Oscar Alvarez and Alfredo Glasman, who made history at Ajax of Epirus.

=== Veria ===
In summer 2010, after 4 years in PAS, Saitiotis decided to sign for the club Veria in Beta Ethniki.

=== AEL ===
In the summer of 2011 he joined AEL. On 18 December, he scored his first two goals in a 5–2 win over Anagennisi Epanomi. In February 2012, he retired as a professional footballer due to heart problems at the age of thirty.

=== Later years ===
In January 2018, Saitiotis came out of retirement signing for Moudania, playing at the amateur divisions of Chalkidiki.

== Honours ==
PAS Giannina

- Greek Second Division promotion: 2008–09

Individual

- Top Scorer of Greek Football Cup: 2006–07 (together with Jozef Kožlej)
