= Nicolás Schenone =

Uruguayan footballer (born 1986)

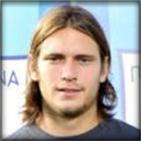

Personal information
- Full name: Nicolás Andrés Schenone Paz de Olivera
- Date of birth: 24 April 1986 (age 40)
- Place of birth: Montevideo, Uruguay
- Height: 1.80 m (5 ft 11 in)
- Position: Defensive midfielder

Team information
- Current team: Cerro

Senior career*
| Years | Team | Apps | (Gls) |
| 2005–2008 | Miramar Misiones | 46 | (4) |
| 2008–2009 | Cerro Largo | 13 | (1) |
| 2009–2011 | PAS Giannina | 1 | (0) |
| 2010 | → Sud América (loan) | 6 | (0) |
| 2011 | → Anagennisi Karditsa (loan) | 12 | (0) |
| 2011 | Cerro Largo | 11 | (0) |
| 2012 | América de Cali | 39 | (2) |
| 2013 | Liverpool de Montevideo | 7 | (0) |
| 2013–2014 | Alavés | 1 | (0) |
| 2014 | Cerro Largo | 8 | (0) |
| 2014–2016 | Talleres Córdoba | 16 | (1) |
| 2016 | Miramar Misiones | 2 | (0) |
| 2016–2017 | Canadian Soccer Club | 11 | (0) |
| 2017– | Cerro | 0 | (0) |
- * Club domestic league appearances and goals as of 11 January 2017 (UTC)

Nicolás Andrés Schenone Paz de Olivera (born April 24, 1986 in Montevideo), commonly known as Nicolás Schenone, is a Uruguayan footballer who plays for Cerro as a midfielder.

== Career ==
Schenone started his professional career playing with Miramar Misiones in 2005. In mid 2008, he went to Cerro Largo FC where he played for one year before making the leap to Europe to play in the Super League Greece.

In September 2009, he signed with PAS Giannina After a season without having much continuity in the first team, he went on loan to Sud América for six months to play in the Uruguayan Second Level. He was loaned six months more to play for Greek Football League side Anagennisi Karditsa.

In July 2011, he returned to Uruguay to play again for Cerro Largo. After an outstanding championship he called the attention of various South American clubs being interested on him. Finally, in January 2012 he was transferred to Colombian giants América de Cali who were just relegated to Categoría Primera B. Schenone and his teammates couldn´t succeed to return América to Colombian Top Division.

In February 2013, he agreed a new deal with Uruguayan club Liverpool de Montevideo.

In September 2013, Schenone signed a new contract with Spanish side Deportivo Alavés who were just promoted to Segunda División. He made his debut on 10 September 2013 on a Copa del Rey match against Real Zaragoza. Later on 15 September 2013, he made his League debut on a 2-1 away loss against Real Murcia.
