= Flávio (footballer, born 1980) =

Brazilian footballer

Personal information
- Full name: Flávio Pinto de Souza
- Date of birth: 12 March 1980 (age 46)
- Place of birth: Niterói, Brazil
- Height: 1.79 m (5 ft 10 in)
- Position: Right back

Youth career
- 1998–1999: Fluminense

Senior career*
| Years | Team | Apps | (Gls) |
| 2000–2002 | Fluminense | 62 | (1) |
| 2003 | FC Chernomorets Novorossiysk | 17 | (0) |
| 2003–2005 | Santos | 28 | (0) |
| 2006–2007 | Figueirense | 34 | (2) |
| 2007–2009 | Asteras Tripolis | 46 | (0) |
| 2009 | Aris | 9 | (1) |
| 2010 | AEL | 11 | (0) |
| 2011 | Criciúma | | |

International career
| 2000 | Brazil | 1 | (0) |
- * Club domestic league appearances and goals

Flávio Pinto de Souza (born 12 August 1980), or simply Flávio, is a Brazilian former football player.

== Honours ==
- Rio de Janeiro State League: 2000
- Brazilian League: 2004
- Santa Catarina State League: 2006
