= Ivica Majstorović =

German-Croatian footballer

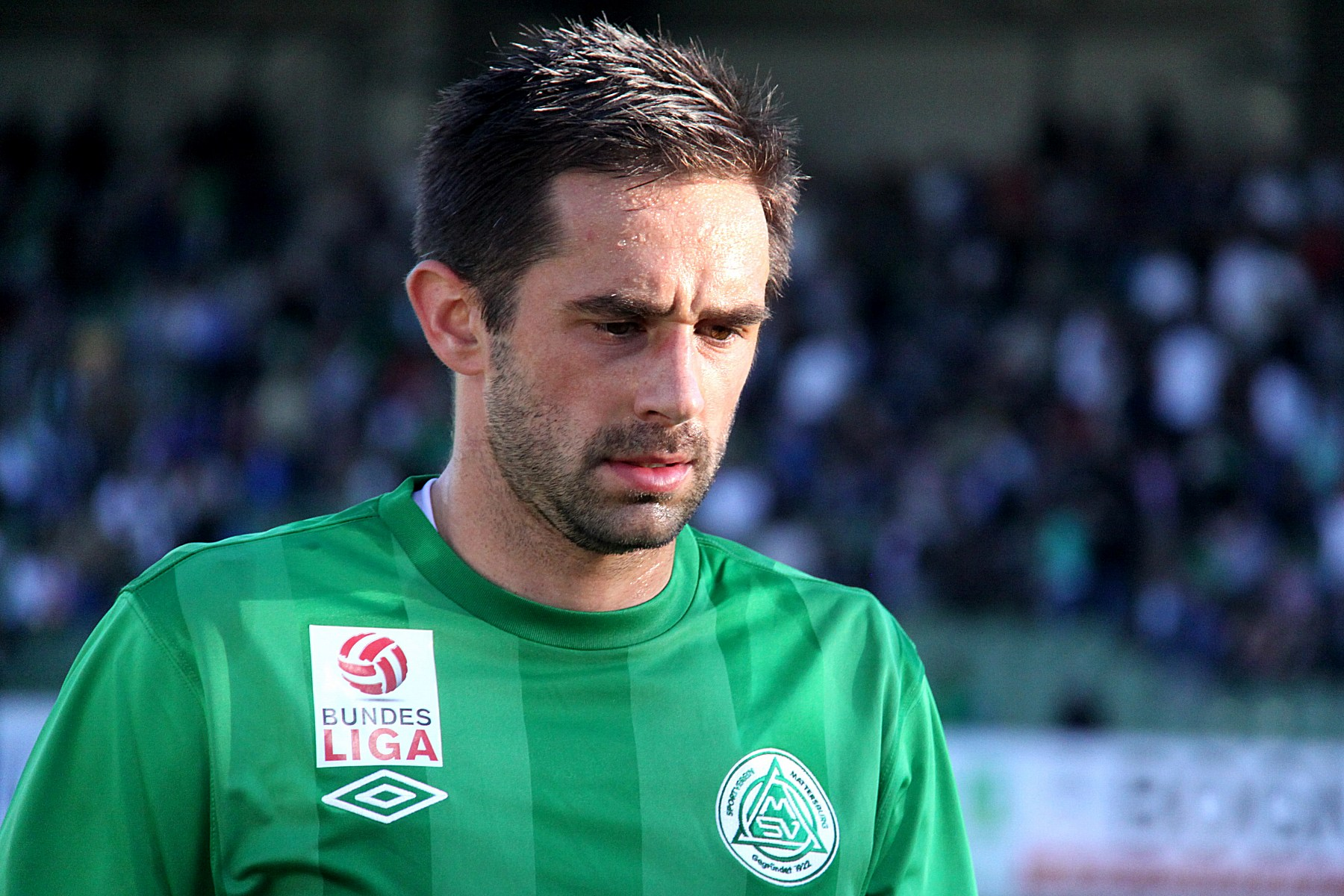
- Majstorović with in SV Mattersburg in 2013

Personal information
- Date of birth: 20 September 1981 (age 45)
- Place of birth: Munich, West Germany
- Height: 1.86 m (6 ft 1 in)
- Positions: Defensive midfielder; centre-back

Senior career*
Years	Team	Apps	(Gls)
2001–2007	SpVgg Unterhaching	104	(1)
2007–2009	Panionios	53	(2)
2009–2010	PAS Giannina	27	(1)
2010–2013	Kerkyra	54	(1)
2013	AEL Kalloni	12	(0)
2013–2015	SV Mattersburg	51	(7)
Total		301	(12)
- * Club domestic league appearances and goals

Ivica Majstorović (born 20 September 1981) is a German-Croatian retired footballer who played as a defensive midfielder, centre-back.
