= Marcelo Sarmiento =

Argentine footballer

Personal information
- Full name: Marcelo Sarmiento
- Date of birth: November 3, 1979 (age 46)
- Place of birth: Córdoba, Argentina
- Height: 1.75 m (5 ft 9 in)
- Position: Midfielder

Youth career
- 1995–1997: Club Atletico las Flores

Senior career*
| Years | Team | Apps | (Gls) |
| 1997–2002 | Talleres | 32 | (1) |
| 2002–2003 | Litex Lovech | 4 | (0) |
| 2003–2005 | Olimpo | 64 | (1) |
| 2005–2006 | Argentinos Juniors | 31 | (0) |
| 2006–2007 | Southampton | 0 | (0) |
| 2007 | Argentinos Juniors | 15 | (0) |
| 2007–2009 | AEL | 56 | (3) |
| 2009–2012 | Atromitos | 50 | (2) |
| 2012–2013 | Unión | 32 | (0) |
| Total | | 284 | (7) |
- * Club domestic league appearances and goals

Marcelo Sarmiento (born November 3, 1979, in Córdoba) is an Argentine former professional footballer who last played for Unión de Santa Fe.

== Playing career ==
Sarmiento spent most of his career in Argentina with Talleres de Córdoba, Olimpo and Argentinos Juniors. He had a brief spell on loan to Bulgarian team Litex Lovech and he spent the early part of the 2006–07 season on loan at English club Southampton. Sarmiento arrived at Southampton as a holding midfielder to organize the midfield but on 19 January 2007 he was released, having only made four appearances for the club, three in the Football League Cup and one in the FA Cup.

Sarmiento re-joined his previous club Argentinos Juniors on loan until June 2007 before joining AEL in Greece on a free transfer on a two-year contract plus one-year extension option. For the next two seasons, Sarmiento was a fundamental part of Larissa's squad, playing more than 60 games in total with the maroons, and being one of the key players in midfield.

In summer 2009, he transferred to Atromitos, rejoining his old Larissa coach Georgios Donis. After a two-year stint at Atromitos, he left Greece to join the newly promoted Argentine Primera División side Unión in July 2011.
