= Paraskevas Andralas =

Greek former footballer

Paris Andralas
Personal information
- Full name: Paraskevas Andralas
- Date of birth: 2 December 1978 (age 47)
- Place of birth: Piraeus, Greece
- Height: 1.79 m (5 ft 10 1/2 in)
- Position: Defender

Team information
- Current team: Thyella Rafina (manager)

Senior career*
Years	Team	Apps	(Gls)
1995–2004	Proodeftiki	166	(9)
2004–2005	PAOK	25	(1)
2005–2009	Levadiakos	59	(3)
2009–2012	PAS Giannina	56	(2)
2012–2013	Panionios	14	(1)
2013	Acharnaikos	15	(0)
2014–2015	Thyella Rafina		
2015–2016	Proodeftiki	18	(0)

Managerial career
- 2016: Proodeftiki (youth)
- 2016–2017: Proodeftiki
- 2017: Rodos
- 2018: Fostiras
- 2018–2019: Asteras Itea
- 2019–2020: Fostiras
- 2020–2022: Lamia (assistant)
- 2022–2023: Diagoras
- 2023: Proodeftiki
- 2023–2024: Proodeftiki
- 2024: Korinthos
- 2024–: Thyella Rafina
- * Club domestic league appearances and goals as of September 2013

Paraskevas "Paris" Andralas (Greek: Παρασκευάς "Πάρης" Ανδράλας; born 2 December 1978) is a Greek professional football manager and former player.

== Honours ==
- PAS Giannina
  - Greek Second Division: 2011
