= Patrick Dimbala =

Congolese-Belgian footballer

Personal information
- Full name: Patrick Dimbala Mawongo
- Date of birth: 20 September 1982 (age 44)
- Place of birth: Kinshasa, Zaire
- Height: 1.87 m (6 ft 2 in)
- Position: Forward

Senior career*
Years	Team	Apps	(Gls)
1999–2001	Eendracht Aalst	57	(27)
2002–2004	KAA Gent	58	(29)
2004–2006	Excelsior Mouscron	57	(18)
2006–2007	Asteras Tripolis	18	(7)
2007–2009	Levadiakos	58	(11)
2009–2010	PAS Giannina	26	(2)
2010–2011	Levadiakos	18	(4)
2011–2012	Panionios	11	(2)
2012–2013	Panetolikos	1	(0)
2013	AEL Kalloni	24	(2)
2014–2015	Tournai	10	(6)
2015–2016	Dender EH	49	(28)
2016–2017	FC Lebbeke		

International career
2010	DR Congo	1	(0)

Managerial career
- 2017–2019: Olympic Charleroi (assistant)
- * Club domestic league appearances and goals

Patrick Dimbala (born 20 September 1982 in Kinshasa) is a retired Congolese-Belgian footballer.

== Playing career ==
Dimbala has one official cap for DR Congo national football team.

== Managerial career ==
Dimbala retired at the end of the 2016/17 season and was appointed as assistant manager of Olympic Charleroi. He decided to resign on 13 March 2019, the club announced.
