= Dimitris Thanopoulos =

Greek footballer

Personal information
- Full name: Dimitrios Thanopoulos
- Date of birth: 26 August 1987 (age 39)
- Place of birth: Greece
- Position: Midfielder

Team information
- Current team: A.O. Agiou Ierotheou

Youth career
- Olympiacos

Senior career*
Years	Team	Apps	(Gls)
2004–2008	Olympiacos	0	(0)
2006	→ Thrasyvoulos (loan)	10	(0)
2007	→ Panthrakikos (loan)	4	(0)
2007	→ Panachaiki (loan)	4	(0)
2008	→ Lamia (loan)	19	(6)
2008–2009	P.A.O.N.E.	31	(7)
2009	Panetolikos	1	(0)
2010–2011	Zakynthos	15	(3)
2011	Anagennisi Giannitsa		
2011–2013	A.O. Iason Iliou		
2014–2015	A.E. Kifisia		
2015–2016	Ilisiakos		
2016–	A.O. Agiou Ierotheou		
- * Club domestic league appearances and goals

Dimitris Thanopoulos (born 26 August 1987 in Greece) is a Greek footballer playing as a midfielder.

== Career ==
He started his career from the Olympiacos youth academy, and he has been capped with the Greek U-19 national team.
