= Lampros Vangelis =

Greek footballer

Personal information
- Full name: Lampros Vangelis
- Date of birth: 10 February 1982 (age 44)
- Place of birth: Neochori, Arta, Greece
- Height: 1.83 m (6 ft 0 in)
- Position: Right midfielder

Senior career*
Years	Team	Apps	(Gls)
1999–2000	AC Siena	0	(0)
2000–2001	Hellas Verona (loan)	12	(1)
2001–2003	AC Siena	2	(0)
2003–2009	PAOK	64	(3)
2009–2011	PAS Giannina	12	(0)
2011–2012	Thrasyvoulos	8	(0)

International career
2002–2003	Greece U21	9	(0)
- * Club domestic league appearances and goals

Lampros Vangelis (Greek: Λάμπρος Βαγγελής; born 10 February 1982) is a Greek former footballer.

== Career ==
Born in Neochori, Arta, Vangelis first played for Rakoun before moving to Italian Side AC Siena. After a good season with Siena he was signed by PAOK, and in 2007 he signed a two-year contract extension with the club.

== Honours ==
PAS Giannina

- Beta Ethniki: 2010–11
