= Giorgos Margaritis =

Greek footballer

Personal information
- Date of birth: 20 June 1991 (age 35)
- Place of birth: Thessaloniki, Greece
- Height: 1.79 m (5 ft 10 1/2 in)
- Position: Left back

Team information
- Current team: Olympiacos Volou

Senior career*
Years	Team	Apps	(Gls)
2007–2009	Agrotikos Asteras	15	(0)
2009–2011	PAS Giannina	0	(0)
2010	→ Agrotikos Asteras (loan)	0	(0)
2010–2011	→ Nafpaktiakos Asteras (loan)	10	(0)
2011	→ Anagennisi Karditsa (loan)	0	(0)
2011–2012	Agrotikos Asteras	30	(0)
2012–2014	Aris	31	(0)
2014–2015	Olympiacos Volou	14	(0)
2015–2016	Kavala	14	(0)
2016	Ethnikos Neo Agioneri	11	(0)
2016-2020	P.A.O. Koufalia	46+	(0)
2020-2021	Olympiakos Kyminon	?	(?)
- * Club domestic league appearances and goals as of 22 August 2021

Giorgos Margaritis (Greek: Γιώργος Μαργαρίτης; born 20 June 1991) is a Greek footballer who plays as a left back.
