= Petros Kanakoudis =

Greek former footballer (born in 1984)

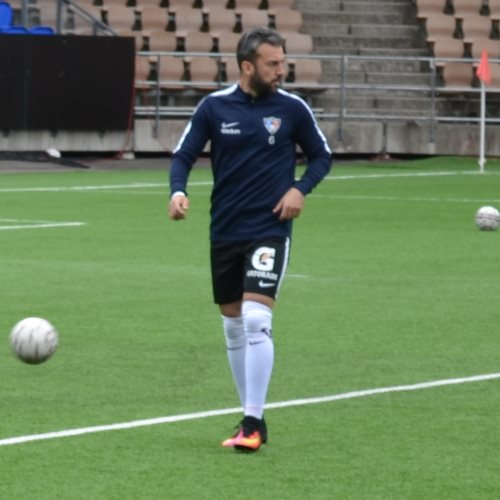

Personal information
- Date of birth: 16 April 1984 (age 42)
- Place of birth: Thessaloniki, Greece
- Height: 1.80 m (5 ft 11 in)
- Position: Left-back

Senior career*
Years	Team	Apps	(Gls)
2001–2003	PAOK	1	(0)
2003–2005	ILTEX Lykoi	34	(0)
2005	PAOK	0	(0)
2005–2006	Veria	25	(2)
2006–2009	Asteras Tripolis	69	(6)
2009–2010	PAS Giannina	16	(0)
2010–2011	Iraklis	14	(0)
2011–2012	Doxa Drama	8	(1)
2012	Veria	11	(0)
2012–2013	Platanias	25	(1)
2013–2014	Apollon Smyrnis	17	(0)
2014–2015	Kerkyra	5	(0)
2015–2018	Inter Turku	62	(1)
2018	Aris	5	(1)
2018–2021	Iraklis	24	(9)

International career
	Greece U-21	8	(0)
- * Club domestic league appearances and goals as of 16 August 2018

Petros Kanakoudis (Greek: Πέτρος Κανακούδης; born 16 April 1984) is a Greek former professional footballer who played as a left-back.

== Career ==
After 14 years playing in Greece for PAOK, ILTEX Lykoi, Asteras Tripolis, PAS Giannina, Iraklis, Doxa Drama, Veria, Apollon Smyrnis, Kerkyra and Platanias., Kanakoudis signed a year contract with FC Inter Turku, playing abroad for the first time in his career.

== Career statistics ==
=== Club ===
As of 26 October 2020

Club	Season	League		Cup		Continental^{[A]}		Others^{[B]}		Total	
Club	Season	Apps	Goals	Apps	Goals	Apps	Goals	Apps	Goals	Apps	Goals
PAOK	2001–02	0	0	1	0	0	0	-	-	1	0
PAOK	2002–03	1	0	0	0	0	0	-	-	1	0
PAOK	Total	1	0	1	0	0	0	-	-	2	0
ILTEX Lykoi	2003–04	?	?	1	0	-	-	-	-	1	0
ILTEX Lykoi	2004–05	?	?	2	0	-	-	-	-	2	0
ILTEX Lykoi	Total	34	0	3	0	-	-	-	-	37	0
PAOK	2005	0	0	-	-	-	-	-	-	0	0
PAOK	Total	0	0	-	-	-	-	-	-	0	0
Veria	2005–06	25	2	2	0	-	-	-	-	27	2
Veria	Total	25	2	2	0	-	-	-	-	27	2
Asteras Tripolis	2006–07	23	5	2	0	-	-	-	-	25	5
Asteras Tripolis	2007–08	21	1	1	0	-	-	-	-	22	1
Asteras Tripolis	2008–09	25	0	3	0	-	-	-	-	28	0
Asteras Tripolis	Total	69	6	6	0	-	-	-	-	75	6
PAS Giannina	2009–10	15	0	3	0	-	-	-	-	18	0
PAS Giannina	Total	15	0	3	0	-	-	-	-	18	0
Iraklis	2010–11	14	0	1	0	-	-	-	-	15	0
Iraklis	Total	14	0	1	0	-	-	-	-	15	0
Doxa Drama	2011	9	1	1	0	-	-	-	-	10	1
Doxa Drama	Total	9	1	1	0	-	-	-	-	10	1
Veria	2012	11	0	-	-	-	-	-	-	11	0
Veria	Total	11	0	-	-	-	-	-	-	11	0
Platanias	2012–13	25	1	2	0	-	-	-	-	27	1
Platanias	Total	25	1	2	0	-	-	-	-	27	1
Apollon Smyrnis	2013–14	17	1	0	0	-	-	-	-	17	0
Apollon Smyrnis	Total	17	1	0	0	-	-	-	-	17	0
Kerkyra	2014–15	4	0	2	0	-	-	-	-	6	0
Kerkyra	Total	4	0	2	0	-	-	-	-	6	0
Inter Turku	2015	24	0	4	0	-	-	1	0	29	0
Inter Turku	2016	20	0	0	0	-	-	0	0	20	0
Inter Turku	2017	20	1	6	0	-	-	0	0	26	1
Inter Turku	Total	64	1	10	0	-	-	1	0	75	1
Aris	2017–18	5	1	-	-	-	-	-	-	5	1
Aris	Total	5	1	-	-	-	-	-	-	5	1
Iraklis	2018–19	0	0	2	0	-	-	-	-	2	0
Iraklis	2019–20	13	9	-	-	-	-	-	-	13	9
Iraklis	2020–21	11	0	-	-	-	-	-	-	11	0
Iraklis	Total	24	9	2	0	-	-	-	-	26	9
Asteras Tripoli total		69	6	6	0	-	-	-	-	75	6
Inter Turku total		64	1	10	0	-	-	1	0	75	1
Iraklis total		38	9	3	0	-	-	-	-	41	9
Greece total		253	21	23	0	-	-	-	-	276	21
Finland total		64	1	10	0	-	-	1	0	75	1
Career total		317	22	33	0	0	0	1	0	351	22

== Honours ==
=== Asteras Tripolis ===
- Beta Ethniki: 2006–07

=== Iraklis ===
- Macedonia FCA Fourth Division: 2019–20
