= Juan Carlos Blengio =

Argentine footballer and coach

Personal information
- Full name: Juan Carlos Blengio
- Date of birth: 26 June 1980 (age 46)
- Place of birth: San Fernando, Argentina
- Height: 1.85 m (6 ft 1 in)
- Positions: Centre back; left back

Team information
- Current team: Tigre (caretaker)

Senior career*
Years	Team	Apps	(Gls)
2000–2009	Tigre	255	(8)
2009–2010	→ Atromitos (loan)	13	(0)
2010–2012	Tigre	12	(0)
2012–2014	Gimnasia y Esgrima La Plata	37	(1)
2014–2018	Tigre	57	(3)

Managerial career
- 2018–: Tigre (reserves)
- 2018: Tigre (caretaker)
- 2024: Tigre (caretaker)
- 2026–: Tigre (caretaker)
- * Club domestic league appearances and goals

Juan Carlos Blengio (born 26 June 1980 in San Fernando, Buenos Aires) is an Argentine football coach and former player who played as either a Centre back or a left back. He is the current caretaker manager of Tigre.

== Career ==
Blengio started his playing career in 2000 with Tigre in the Argentine 3rd division. In 2004-2005 the club won both of the league titles to secure promotion to the 2nd division. In 2007 the club were promoted to the Argentine Primera División. The Apertura 2007 was Tigre's first season in the Primera since 1980, and Blengio's first taste of top flight football. Blengio was a key member of the first team, playing in 14 of Tigre's 19 games. The club finished in 2nd place which was the highest league finish in their history.

Blengio left Tigre in July 2009 and joined Greek club Atromitos on loan. However, he returned to Tigre the following season. He left Tigre in July 2012, when he signed for one season with Gimnasia y Esgrima La Plata. He stayed another year in La Plata, until his contract finalized and he returned to Tigre in 2014.

== Honours ==
Season	Team	Title
Apertura 2004	Tigre	Primera B Metropolitana
Clausura 2005	Tigre	Primera B Metropolitana
