= Kostas Mendrinos =

Greek footballer

Personal information
- Full name: Konstantinos Mendrinos
- Date of birth: 28 May 1985 (age 41)
- Place of birth: Piraeus, Greece
- Height: 1.79 m (5 ft 10 in)
- Position: Midfielder

Youth career
- –2002: Olympiacos

Senior career*
Years	Team	Apps	(Gls)
2002–2009	Olympiacos	30	(1)
2002–2003	→ Atromitos (loan)	7	(1)
2003–2004	→ Ionikos (loan)	10	(0)
2005–2006	→ Ionikos (loan)	7	(0)
2009–2010	PAS Giannina	24	(1)
2010–2011	Aris	20	(0)
2011–2012	Panachaiki	10	(1)
2012–2014	Panionios	48	(1)
2014–2017	Platanias	83	(4)
2017–2018	Apollon Smyrnis	21	(0)
2018	Iraklis	8	(0)
2019–2020	Panargiakos	12	(1)
2020–2021	Vyzas Megara		
2021–2023	Keratsini	20	(2)

International career
2004–2006	Greece U21	6	(0)

Managerial career
- 2023–2024: Keratsini
- * Club domestic league appearances and goals as of 9 December 2018

Kostas Mendrinos (Greek: Κώστας Μενδρινός, born 28 May 1985) is a Greek former professional footballer who played as a midfielder.

== Career ==
Mendrinos started his career at the youth teams of Olympiacos, where he broke into the first team in 2002. He left Olympiacos on 27 April 2009, after a disagreement with the club for renewal of his contract. He joined PAS Giannina on 27 May 2009, but left in May 2010, shortly after his team was relegated to next season's Football League.

Mendrinos joined Aris on 15 June 2010. He was released from the Thessaloniki club in late June of the following year after reports involving him in attempting to manipulate a UEFA Europa League match's kick-off against Manchester City. In September 2011 he joined Football League side Panachaiki and on 16 January 2012 he moved to Super League side Panionios. At the end of 2013, Mendrinos has announced a 1,5 year contract with Platanias. On 27 May 2015, he renewed his contract with the club till the summer of 2017. On 23 May 2017 Apollon Smyrnis announced that Mendrinos would join them on a free transfer after the expiry of his contract. On 7 August 2018, he joined Iraklis on a two-year contract.

Until the end of 2013 Mendrinos has 11 international appearances with Olympiacos and Aris in UEFA Champions League and UEFA Europa League.

== Honours ==
=== Club ===
Olympiacos

- Super League Greece: 2006–07, 2007–08, 2008–09
- Greek Cup: 2007–08, 2008–09
- Greek Super Cup: 2007
