= Proastio, Kozani =

Proastio Προάστιο, Дорутово
- Community
- Location within Greece
- Coordinates: 40°29′21″N 21°42′41″E
- Country: Greece
- Administrative region: Western Macedonia
- Regional unit: Kozani
- Municipality: Eordaia
- Municipal unit: Ptolemaida
- Elevation: 641 m (2,103 ft)

Population (2021)
  - Community: 349
- Time zone: UTC+2 (EET)
  - Summer (DST): UTC+3 (EEST)
- Postal code: 50200
- Area code: 24630

Proastio (Greek: Προάστιο, South Slavic: Дурутово, Durutovo or Дорутово, Dorutovo) is a village located 4 km southeast of Ptolemaida, in Kozani regional unit, within the Greek region of Macedonia. It is situated at an altitude of 641 meters. At the 2021 census, the population was 349.
