= 2010–11 Iraklis F.C. season =

G.S. Iraklis Thessalonikis 2010–11 association football season

Iraklis
2010–11 season
- President: Ioannis Takis
- Manager: Jozef Bubenko (until 7 August 2010); Marinos Ouzounidis (from 9 August 2010 until 31 January 2011); Georgios Paraschos (from 31 January 2011)
- Super League Greece: 16th (relegated)
- Greek Cup: Fifth round
- Top goalscorer: League: Bogdan Mara (5); All: Bogdan Mara (6)
- Highest home attendance: 10,752 vs Olympiacos (28 August 2010)
- Lowest home attendance: 1,055 vs Panionios (20 March 2011)
Home colours	Away colours	Third colours

The 2010–2011 season was Iraklis 30th consecutive (and 51st in total) season in the Super League Greece.

== Transfers ==
=== In ===
Date	Player	From	Fee	Source
30 June 2010	(Czech Republic) Jiří Krejčí	(Czech Republic) FK Baumit Jablonec	Free	
14 July 2010	(Canada) Gianluca Zavarise	(Germany) VfL Bochum II	Free	
15 July 2010	(Poland) Robert Szczot	(Poland) Górnik Zabrze	Free	
15 July 2010	(Greece) Petros Kanakoudis	(Greece) PAS Giannina	Free	
17 July 2010	(Nigeria) Abraham Alechenwu	(Albania) KF Tirana	Free	
23 July 2010	(Algeria) Karim Soltani	(Netherlands) ADO Den Haag	Free	
30 July 2010	(Greece) Georgios Kyriazis	(Italy) Salernitana	Free	
2 August 2010	(Greece) Nikos Arabatzis	(Greece) PAOK	Free	
2 August 2010	(Uruguay) Pablo Lima	(Argentina) Vélez Sársfield	Free	
3 August 2010	(Greece) Dimitrios Eleftheropoulos	(Greece) PAS Giannina	Free	
7 August 2010	(Spain) Josemi	(Spain) RCD Mallorca	Free	
17 August 2010	(Slovenia) Mirnes Šišić	(Greece) PAS Giannina	Free	
31 August 2010	(Uruguay) Marcel Román	(Italy) Genoa C.F.C.	1-year loan	
31 August 2010	(Portugal) Dani	(Romania) CFR Cluj	Free	
7 January 2011	(Argentina) Javier Robles	(United States) San Jose Earthquakes	Free	
8 January 2011	(Cameroon) Louis Clément Ngwat-Mahop	(Austria) Red Bull Salzburg	Free	
14 January 2011	(Morocco) Monsef Zerka	(France) FC Nantes	Free	
18 January 2011	(Cameroon) Joël Epalle	(Azerbaijan) FK Baku	Free	
24 January 2011	(Poland) Norbert Witkowski	(Poland) Arka Gdynia	Free	
31 January 2011	(Nigeria) Sani Kaita	(France) AS Monaco	6-month loan	

=== Out ===
Date	Player	To	Fee	Source
1 May 2010	(Croatia) Ivan Bošnjak	(China) Chongqing Lifan	Released	
10 May 2010	(Greece) Kostas Giannoulis	(Germany) Köln	€100,000	
1 June 2010	(Argentina) Lucas Rimoldi	(Argentina) All Boys	Released	
1 June 2010	(Spain) Francisco Martos	(Spain) Eibar	Released	
1 June 2010	(Portugal) Daniel Fernandes	(Germany) Bochum	End of loan	
1 June 2010	(Portugal) André Marques	(Portugal) Sporting CP	End of loan	
18 June 2010	(Germany) Denis Epstein	(Greece) Olympiacos	Released	
28 June 2010	(Greece) Grigoris Papazaharias	(Greece) Aris Thessaloniki	Released	
14 July 2010	(Portugal) Nuno Piloto	(Portugal) Olhanense	Released	
20 July 2010	(Greece) Charalabos Perperidis	(Greece) Panthrakikos	Released	
21 July 2010	(Greece) Georgios Ioannidis	(Greece) Panathinaikos	Released	
22 July 2010	(Greece) Dimitris Giantsis	(Greece) Kerkyra	Released	
26 July 2010	(Greece) Panagiotis Kone	(Italy) Brescia	Released	
15 October 2010	(Czech Republic) Jiří Krejčí	(Romania) Timişoara	Released	
December 2010	(Japan) Daigo Kobayashi	(Japan) Shimizu S-Pulse	Released	
26 December 2010	(Nigeria) Abraham Alechenwu	(Albania) Vllaznia Shkodër	Released	
29 December 2010	(Greece) Achilleas Sarakatsanos	(Greece) Trikala	Released	
28 January 2010	(Greece) Apostolos Vellios	(England) Everton	€300,000	

== Club ==
=== Management ===
Position	Staff
Head coach	(Slovakia) Jozef Bubenko (until 7 August 2010) (Greece) Marinos Ouzounidis (from 9 August 2010 until 31 January 2011) (Greece) Georgios Paraschos (from 31 January 2011)
Assistant coach	(Slovakia) Jozef Pavlik (until 7 August 2010) (Greece) Pagonis Vakalopoulos (from 9 August 2010)
General manager	(Greece) Grigoris Fanaras
Physical trainer	(Slovakia) Anton Dragúň (until 7 August 2010) (Greece) Theodoros Eleftheriadis (from 9 August 2010 until 8 February 2011) (Greece) Charalambos Mavridis (from 8 February 2011)
Goalkeeper Trainer	(Greece) Fotios Gizelis
Supervisor of medical department	(Greece) Charalambos Lazaridis
Doctor	(Greece) Konstantinos Manologlou
Physiotherapist	(Greece) Petros Gazas
Physiotherapist	(Greece) Konstantinos Tsiolakidis
Masseur	(Greece) Thomas Nikou
Care Taker	(Greece) Georgios Siagas
Care Taker	(Greece) Eleftherios Iliadis

Last updated: January 2011
Source: iraklis-fc.gr

=== Kit ===
Supplier: Legea
Sponsor(s): OPAP

Home	Away	Third kit

Source: iraklis-fc.gr

=== Other information ===
Chairman	(Greece) Ioannis Takis
Vice President	(Greece) Dimitrios Dimitriou
Team Director	
Ground (capacity and dimensions)	Kaftanzoglio Stadium (28,028 / 68x105 m)

Source: kaftanzoglio.gr

== Pre-season and friendlies ==
Date	Opponent	Venue	Result	Attendance	Scorers
21 July 2010	Doxa Katokopia	A	2-2	-	Garcia, Iacob
24 July 2010	Makedonikos F.C.	A	1-3	-	Voutsias
30 July 2010	Calcio Catania	A	0-1 ^{†}	-	
7 August 2010	Calcio Padova	A	1-3	-	Katsabis
10 August 2010	Panserraikos F.C.	A	0-2	-	
21 August 2010	Pierikos	A	0-0	-	
4 September 2010	Panserraikos F.C.	H	0-2	-	

^{†} Match abandoned after 70 minutes.

== Super League Greece ==
=== League table ===
Pos	Team	Pld	W	D	L	GF	GA	GD	Pts	Qualification or relegation
12	Kerkyra	30	9	6	15	30	40	−10	33	
13	Asteras Tripolis	30	7	10	13	21	29	−8	31	
14	AEL (R)	30	5	10	15	29	47	−18	25	Relegation to the Football League
15	Panserraikos (R)	30	6	6	18	22	48	−26	24	Relegation to the Football League
16	Iraklis (R)	30	7	14	9	22	28	−6	35	Relegation to the Football League 2 (Note: On 19 May 2011, the Disciplinary Committee of the competition found Iraklis guilty of forgery during the winter transfer window. Therefore the club was automatically put at the end of the league table and demoted to the Football League.)

Source: Super League Greece
Rules for classification: 1) Points; 2) Head-to-head points; 3) Head-to-head goal difference; 4) Play-offs (neutral ground); 7) Draw.
(Note: Criterion 4 is only used if needed to decide champion, teams for relegation or teams for UEFA competitions).
(R) Relegated

==== Results summary ====
Overall								Home						Away					
Pld	W	D	L	GF	GA	GD	Pts	W	D	L	GF	GA	GD	W	D	L	GF	GA	GD
30	7	14	9	22	28	−6	35	5	8	2	12	9	+3	2	6	7	10	19	−9

Last updated: 17 April 2011.

==== Results by round ====
Round	1	2	3	4	5	6	7	8	9	10	11	12	13	14	15	16	17	18	19	20	21	22	23	24	25	26	27	28	29	30
Ground	H	A	H	H	A	H	A	H	A	H	A	A	H	A	H	A	H	A	A	H	A	H	A	H	A	H	H	A	H	A
Result	W	D	W	L	D	D	D	D	D	W	L	L	D	L	W	L	W	L	L	D	W	D	D	D	W	L	D	L	D	D
Position	3	3	1	3	5	8	7	8	10	6	7	8	9	10	10	13	8	9	12	12	9	9	10	10	7	9	10	11	10	10

A = Away; H = Home; W = Win; D = Draw; L = Loss

==== Matches ====
Date	Opponent	Venue	Result	Attendance	Scorers
28 August 2010	Olympiacos	H	2-1	10,752	Mara (pen.), Vellios
11 September 2010	Atromitos	A	1-1	1,690	Soltani
18 September 2010	AEL	H	1-0	2,829	Cousin (o.g.)
26 September 2010	Kavala	H	0-1	2,903	
3 October 2010	Kerkyra	A	0-0	560	
17 October 2010	Panserraikos	H	1-1	1,628	Soltani
23 October 2010	Asteras Tripolis	A	0-0	2,482	
31 October 2010	Olympiacos Volos	H	0-0	2,134	
6 November 2010	Skoda Xanthi	A	2-2	1,978	Mara, Soltani
15 November 2010	Aris	H	1-0	4,630	Soltani
20 November 2010	Panathinaikos	A	2-4	20,154	Mara, Garcia
28 November 2010	Panionios	A	0-1	2,647	
4 December 2010	Ergotelis	H	1-1	1,903	Lima
11 December 2010	PAOK	A	0-1	13,063	
19 December 2010	AEK Athens	H	2-0	3,278	Dani, Papasterianos
5 January 2011	Olympiacos	A	0-2	25,117	
9 January 2011	Atromitos	H	1-0	1,252	Iacob
16 January 2011	AEL	A	1-2	5,578	Vellios
23 January 2011	Kavala	A	0-3	1,969	
29 January 2011	Kerkyra	H	0-0	1,148	
5 February 2011	Panserraikos	A	2-1	1,973	Ngwat-Mahop, Mara (pen.)
13 February 2011	Asteras Tripolis	H	0-0	2,649	
20 February 2011	Olympiacos Volos	A	1-1	4,118	Mara (pen.)
26 February 2011	Skoda Xanthi	H	1-1	1,249	Dani
5 March 2011	Aris	A	1-0	8,898	Iacob
12 March 2011	Panathinaikos	H	1-3	7,714	Ngwat-Mahop
20 March 2011	Panionios	H	1-1	1,055	Ngwat-Mahop
3 April 2011	Ergotelis	A	0-1		
10 April 2011	PAOK	H	0-0		
17 April 2011	AEK Athens	A	0-0		

== Greek Cup ==
=== Matches ===
Date	Round	Opponent	Venue	Result	Attendance	Scorers
27 October 2010	R4	Panetolikos	A	2-0		Anastasiadis (o.g.), Mara
23 December 2010	R5	Kerkyra	H	1-1		Iacob
12 January 2011	R5 R	Kerkyra	A	0-0 (3-5 pen.)		

== Player statistics ==
- ¹ Denotes player has left the club in the January transfer window. ² Denotes player joined in the January transfer window.

No.	Pos.	Player	Apps	G	YC	RC
2	DF	(Greece) Georgios Kyriazis	14	0	2	0
3	DF	(Nigeria) Abraham Alechenwu¹	0	0	0	0
4	DF	(Greece) Anastasios Katsabis	18	0	1	0
5	DF	(Greece) Giorgos Katsikas	13	0	3	0
6	DF	(Greece) Petros Kanakoudis	14	0	1	0
7	MF	(Poland) Robert Szczot	9	0	1	0
8	MF	(Greece) Stelios Iliadis	7	0	1	0
9	FW	(Greece) Apostolos Vellios¹	12	2	0	0
10	MF	(Romania) Bogdan Mara	27	5	3	0
11	MF	(Brazil) Carlos César Matheus	10	0	2	0
12	FW	(Morocco) Monsef Zerka²	9	0	0	0
13	DF	(Uruguay) Pablo Lima	21	1	3	0
14	MF	(Uruguay) Marcel Román	3	0	0	0
15	MF	(Nigeria) Sani Kaita²	6	0	0	0
16	DF	(Spain) Josemi	26	0	7	0
17	MF	(Greece) Emmanouil Papasterianos	20	1	5	0
18	FW	(Greece) Thomas Tsitas²	1	0	0	0
19	DF	(Greece) Nikos Arabatzis	26	0	7	0
20	FW	(Romania) Victoraş Iacob	19	2	11	1
21	GK	(Greece) Dimitrios Eleftheropoulos	28	0	0	0
26	MF	(Argentina) Miguel Sebastián Garcia	21	1	6	1
27	MF	(Greece) Paschalis Voutsias	8	0	2	0
29	FW	(Cameroon) Louis Ngwat-Mahop²	10	3	3	0
30	MF	(Argentina) Javier Robles²	4	0	1	0
31	GK	(Greece) Ilias Melkas	0	0	0	0
32	MF	(Slovenia) Mirnes Šišić¹	15	0	2	0
33	DF	(Greece) Achilleas Sarakatsanos¹	0	0	0	0
33	GK	(Poland) Norbert Witkowski²	1	0	0	0
37	GK	(Greece) Georgios Bantis	4	0	0	0
40	MF	(Cameroon) Joël Epalle²	10	0	1	0
66	MF	(Portugal) Dani	24	2	7	1
77	MF	(Algeria) Karim Soltani	25	4	6	2
80	MF	(Japan) Daigo Kobayashi¹	6	0	1	0
91	MF	(Greece) Dimitris Stamou²	3	0	0	0

== See also ==
- Iraklis F.C. (Thessaloniki)
- List of Iraklis Thessaloniki F.C. players
- List of Iraklis F.C. seasons
- G.S. Iraklis Thessaloniki
- G.S. Iraklis Thessaloniki (men's basketball)
- Iraklis B.C. in international competitions
- G.S. Iraklis Thessaloniki (women's basketball)
- Ivanofeio Sports Arena
- G.S. Iraklis Thessaloniki (men's volleyball)
- G.S. Iraklis Thessaloniki (women's volleyball)
- G.S. Iraklis Thessaloniki (water polo)
- G.S. Iraklis Thessaloniki (rugby)
