= Szczot =

- Pronunciation: [ʂt͡ʂot]

Origin
- Language: Polish
- Origin: Szczotkować

Szczot is a surname deriving from the Polish word Szczotkować, which literally translates to 'brush'.

== List of people ==
Notable persons with the surname Szczot include:

- Katarzyna Szczot, better known as Kayah, Polish singer.
- Robert Szczot, Polish football player.
