= List of Iraklis F.C. seasons =

Seasons of men's association football team

This is a list of seasons played by Iraklis F.C. in Greek and European association football, from 1959 to the present day. It details the club's achievements in major competitions, and the top scorers for each season.

== Key ==
Key to league:

- Pos. = Final position
- Pl. = Played
- W = Games won
- D = Games drawn
- L = Games lost
- GF = Goals scored
- GA = Goals against
- Pts = Points

Key to rounds:

- W = Winners
- F = Final (Runner-up)
- SF = Semi-finals
- QF = Quarter-finals
- R16/R32 = Round of 16, round of 32, etc.
- PO = Play-off round
- FR = Fourth Round
- 3rTh = 3rd round thessaloniki's
- GS = Group stage
- AR = Additional Round

Champions	Runners-up	Promoted ↑	Relegated ↓

== Seasons ==
Season	League										Greek Cup	Europe		Season Top scorer (Note: Goals in all competitions (Greek Super League, Greek Cup and European) are counted.)	
Season	Tier	Division	Pld	W	D	L	GF	GA	Pts	Pos	Greek Cup	Europe		Name(s)	Goals
G.S. Iraklis Thessalonikis
1959–60	1	First National Division	30	9	10	11	29	34	58	9th	R16				
1960–61	1	First National Division	30	12	7	11	35	31	61	8th	SF				
1961–62	1	First National Division	30	9	9	12	40	48	57	8th	R16	Fairs Cup	R2		
1962–63	1	First National Division	30	11	10	9	35	38	62	6th	R16				
1963–64	1	First National Division	30	7	11	12	26	44	55	12th	R16	Fairs Cup	R1		
1964–65	1	First National Division	30	8	10	12	37	45	56	11th	R32				
1965–66	1	First National Division	30	10	6	14	23	43	56	12th	—				
1966–67	1	First National Division	30	7	12	11	25	39	56	9th	R3				
1967–68	1	First National Division	34	11	9	14	32	38	65	13th	R3				
1968–69	1	First National Division	34	12	7	15	36	39	65	11th	R3				
1969–70	1	First National Division	34	14	12	8	37	31	74	6th	R2				
1970–71	1	First National Division	34	13	15	6	40	30	75	5th	SF				
1971–72	1	First National Division	34	11	11	12	36	40	67	9th	AR				
1972–73	1	First National Division	34	11	13	10	42	39	69	8th	R2				
1973–74	1	First National Division	34	10	13	11	40	37	33	7th	R2				
1974–75	1	First National Division	34	11	10	13	40	40	32	8th	SF				
1975–76	1	First National Division	30	9	9	12	33	39	27	8th	W				
1976–77	1	First National Division	34	10	7	17	33	47	27	12th	R2	Cup Winners' Cup	R1		
1977–78	1	First National Division	34	9	12	13	46	50	30	9th	R3				
1978–79	1	First National Division	34	12	10	12	51	46	34	6th	R2				
1979–80	1	First National Division ↓	34	13	8	13	47	36	34	8th	F				
1980–81	2	Second National Division ↑	38	26	6	6	99	22	58	1st	R1				
1981–82	1	First National Division	34	15	10	9	52	38	40	6th	R3				
1982–83	1	First National Division	34	12	10	12	52	39	34	8th	SF				
1983–84	1	First National Division	30	16	10	4	47	20	42	3rd	SF				
1984–85	1	First National Division	30	19	3	8	59	33	41	5th	R1				
1985–86	1	First National Division	30	14	8	8	34	22	36	4th	R3				
1986–87	1	First National Division	30	13	5	12	34	32	25	6th	F				
1987–88	1	First National Division	30	13	8	9	42	32	34	6th	R1				
1988–89	1	First National Division	30	13	10	7	43	27	36	4th	QF				
1989–90	1	First National Division	34	14	11	9	44	36	39	5th	QF	UEFA Cup	R1		
1990–91	1	First National Division	34	14	9	11	40	36	37	5th	R2	UEFA Cup	R1		
1991–92	1	First National Division	34	10	11	13	41	41	31	9th	R3				
1992–93	1	First National Division	34	16	8	10	51	41	56	6th	R3				
1993–94	1	First National Division	34	13	10	11	59	45	49	6th	SF				
1994–95	1	First National Division	34	18	8	8	55	36	62	6th	R2				
1995–96	1	First National Division	34	17	7	10	51	39	58	4th	R2				
1996–97	1	First National Division	34	11	6	17	41	54	39	13th	R4	UEFA Cup	QR2		
1997–98	1	First National Division	34	14	9	11	49	45	51	6th	SF			Konstantinou	13
1998–99	1	First National Division	34	13	8	13	54	45	47	9th	SF			Konstantinou	10
1999–00	1	First National Division	34	15	5	14	58	58	50	6th	R2			Konstantinou	25
2000–01	1	Superior Division	30	14	4	12	45	40	46	5th	SF	UEFA Cup	R2	Konstantinou	33
2001–02	1	First National Division	26	9	9	8	32	35	36	6th	SF			Fofonka	18
2002–03	1	First National Division	30	15	4	11	44	37	49	7th	R2	UEFA Cup	R1	Mięciel	10
2003–04	1	First National Division	30	12	6	12	40	39	42	8th	QF			Machlas	13
2004–05	1	First National Division	30	12	5	13	36	30	41	7th	R3			Kapetanos, Bakircioglu	6
2005–06	1	First National Division	30	15	6	9	39	31	51	4th	R4			Epalle	13
2006–07	1	Super League	30	10	5	15	25	34	35	13th	R5	UEFA Cup	R1	Herrera	4
2007–08	1	Super League	30	8	11	11	28	33	35	10th	QF			Malagueño	5
2008–09	1	Super League	30	8	9	13	22	38	33	10th	R5			Epstein	4
2009–10	1	Super League	30	10	7	13	39	41	37	10th	R4			Iacob	11
2010–11	1	Super League ↓	30	7	14	9	22	29	35	11th	R5			Mara	6
2011–12	4	Fourth National Division ↑	26	1	3	22	3	65	-3	15th	—				
A.E.P. Iraklis 1908
2011–12	3	Football League 2 ↑	22	9	9	4	31	14	36	5th	—			Konstantinidis	7
2012–13	2	Football League	40	19	14	7	49	25	71	6th	R1			Kirovski	12
2013–14	2	Football League	26	15	3	8	36	19	48	4th	R3			Zahora	10
2014–15	2	Football League ↑	24	17	6	1	34	8	57	1st	SF			Loukinas	15
2015–16	1	Super League	30	8	11	11	24	32	35	12th	QF			Vellios	13
2016–17	1	Super League ↓	30	6	11	13	28	39	31	12th	GS			Perrone, Leozinho, Donis	4
2017–18	3	Third National Division ↑	28	20	5	3	63	17	65	1st	—				
2018–19	2	Football League ↓	30	11	9	10	29	24	39	11th	GS			Perrone	9
A.S. Iraklis 2015
2019–20	8	Macedonia F.C.A. Third Division ↑	15	15	0	0	88	6	45	1st	—			Perrone	13
A.S. Iraklis Ampelokipon
2020–21	4	Third National Division ↑	15	10	3	2	32	7	35	2nd	—				
P.O.T. Iraklis
2021–22	2	Super League 2	32	11	15	6	51	29	48	7th	R4			Tomás	8
2022–23	2	Super League 2	28	15	8	5	56	22	47	5th	R3			Aleksić	18
2023–24	2	Super League 2	22	7	8	7	25	20	29	8th	R3			Kushta	9
2024–25	2	Super League 2	18	11	3	4	31	14	36	2nd	R3			Tsirigotis	22
2025–26	2	Super League 2 ↑	18	13	5	0	34	13	44	1st	LF			Manalis	12
2026–27	1	Super League 1													

== See also ==
- Iraklis F.C. (Thessaloniki)
- List of Iraklis Thessaloniki F.C. players
- G.S. Iraklis Thessaloniki
- G.S. Iraklis Thessaloniki (men's basketball)
- Iraklis B.C. in international competitions
- G.S. Iraklis Thessaloniki (women's basketball)
- Ivanofeio Sports Arena
- G.S. Iraklis Thessaloniki (men's volleyball)
- G.S. Iraklis Thessaloniki (women's volleyball)
- G.S. Iraklis Thessaloniki (water polo)
- G.S. Iraklis Thessaloniki (rugby)
