= Sotiris Stavrakopoulos =

Greek basketball player (born 2004)

No. 77 – Iraklis Thessaloniki
- Position: Power forward
- League: Greek Basketball League; FIBA Europe Cup

Personal information
- Born: 29 November 2004 (age 21) Athens, Greece
- Listed height: 6 ft 8 in (2.03 m)
- Listed weight: 209 lb (95 kg)

Career information
- Playing career: 2021–present

Career history
- 2021–2025: Peristeri
- 2025–2026: Promitheas Patras
- 2026–present: Iraklis Thessaloniki

Sotiris Stavrakopoulos (Greek: Σωτήρης Σταυρακόπουλος; born 29 November 2004) is a Greek professional basketball player for Iraklis Thessaloniki of the Greek Basketball League (GBL) and the FIBA Europe Cup. He is a 2.03 metres (6 feet 8 inches) tall power forward.

== Professional career ==
Stavrakopoulos began playing basketball with Peristeri in 2021. On 2022, he signed his first professional contract with the team. He stayed with Peristeri until 2025.

On 23 June 2025, Stavrakopoulos moned to Promitheas Patras of the Greek Basketball League and the Basketball Champions League, along with his previous head coach in Peristeri Georgios Limniatis.

In August 2026, he signed a 2-year contract with Iraklis Thessaloniki of the Greek Basketball League.

== Personal life ==
He is the son of former professional basketball player Tzanis Stavrakopoulos.
