= Jerzy Iwanow-Szajnowicz =

Polish-Greek athlete

- Born: 14 December 1911; Warsaw, Congress Poland, Russian Empire
- Died: 4 January 1943 (aged 31); Kaisariani, German-occupied Greece
- Cause of death: Execution by firing squad
- Burial place: Third Cemetery of Athens plot 1148; 37°58′48″N 23°40′1″E
- Occupation: Athlete
- Awards: Silver Cross of the Virtuti Militari (1945); George Cross (1962); Golden Cross of Valor (1976)
- Military career
- Other name: Nikolaos Tsenoglou
- Allegiance: Poland (1939); Greece (1940–1943); United Kingdom (1940-1943)
- Branch: Polish Armed Forces (1939); Special Operations Executive (1940-1943); Greek Resistance (1941–1943)
- Service years: 1939–1943
- Rank: SOE Field Agent
- Unit: Special Operations Executive
- Conflicts: World War II; Greek Resistance

Jerzy Iwanow-Szajnowicz (Greek: Γεώργιος Ιβάνωφ-Σαϊνόβιτς, Georgios Ivanof-Sainovits; 14 December 1911 – 4 January 1943) was a Polish athlete who was active as a secret agent in Greece and was collaborating with the Greek Resistance during World War II before his execution by the Germans.

== Life ==
Jerzy Iwanow-Szajnowicz was born in Warsaw on 14 December 1911, as the son of the Russian army colonel Count Vladimir Ivanov, and a Polish mother Leonarda Szajnowicz. His parents divorced soon after. His mother married a Greek merchant, Ioannis Lambrianidis, and together they emigrated to Thessaloniki in northern Greece in 1926.

He became an athlete in the G.S. Iraklis Thessaloniki sport club, and a distinguished swimmer: in 1934, he became Greek champion in 100 m freestyle. After becoming a Polish citizen in 1935, he became part of AZS Warsaw's water polo team and of the Polish national water polo team, and was declared Poland's top water polo player in 1938. Iwanow also graduated from the [Catholic University of Leuven, Faculty of Sciences, Agronomical Institute] in agricultural engineering, followed by post-graduate courses at the Institut National d'Agronomie de la France d'Outre-Mer, in Paris, before returning to Greece.

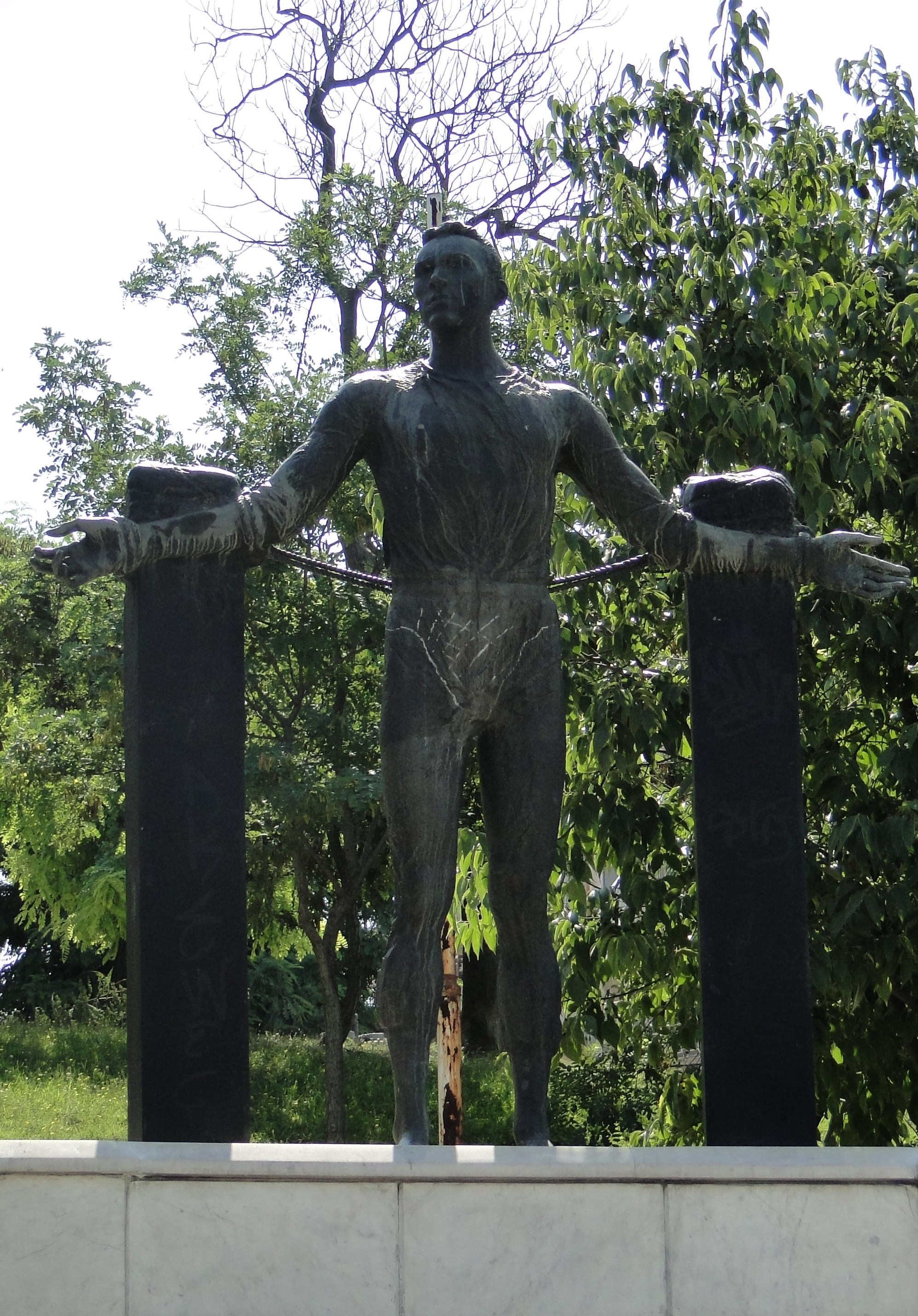
Statue of Jerzy Iwanow-Szajnowicz outside of Ivanofeio Indoor Hall in Thessaloniki

With the outbreak of World War II and the German invasion of Poland, he helped to organize the evacuation of Polish refugees coming to Thessaloniki, and in 1940 was enlisted into Polish intelligence. Fleeing the German invasion of Greece in April 1941, he left the country for the Middle East, to join the exiled Polish forces there. There he was chosen by the Polish intelligence and the SOE for an undercover mission in Greece. On 13 October 1941, the British submarine HMS Thunderbolt (N25) brought him to the coast of Attica near Nea Makri. His subsequent activity in the Greek underground was prodigious: apart from establishing an extensive intelligence network for the Allies reporting on the military and political situation in Greece, on the Greek war industry, now used by the Germans, and on ship and railway schedules, he engaged in numerous sabotage missions. He was responsible for the sabotage of the German aircraft motor repair facilities in the Maltsiniotis plant, which is credited with affecting over 400 engines and causing the crash of several German aircraft due to engine malfunctions, as well as the destruction of two German U-boats, U-133 and U-372, sabotaging the latter and forcing it to surface and be sunk by the RAF off Haifa.

The first time he was caught by the Gestapo on the 20th December 1941, after being betrayed by one of his close friend, Konstantinos Pantos, he managed to escape after three days. The Germans then put a reward on him of 500,000 drachmas. He was finally captured after another betrayal by a former Greek policeman, Pandelis Lambrinopoulos, on 8 September 1942, and sentenced by a German tribunal on 2 December to a triple death sentence. The proposal of a spy exchange for a German general captured by the British was rejected by the British authorities. He was executed at the Kaisariani shooting range on 4 January 1943. In the seconds before execution he attempted to escape. He was just a few meters from a bush when he was shot, wounded and put back in front of the execution squad.

== Memory ==
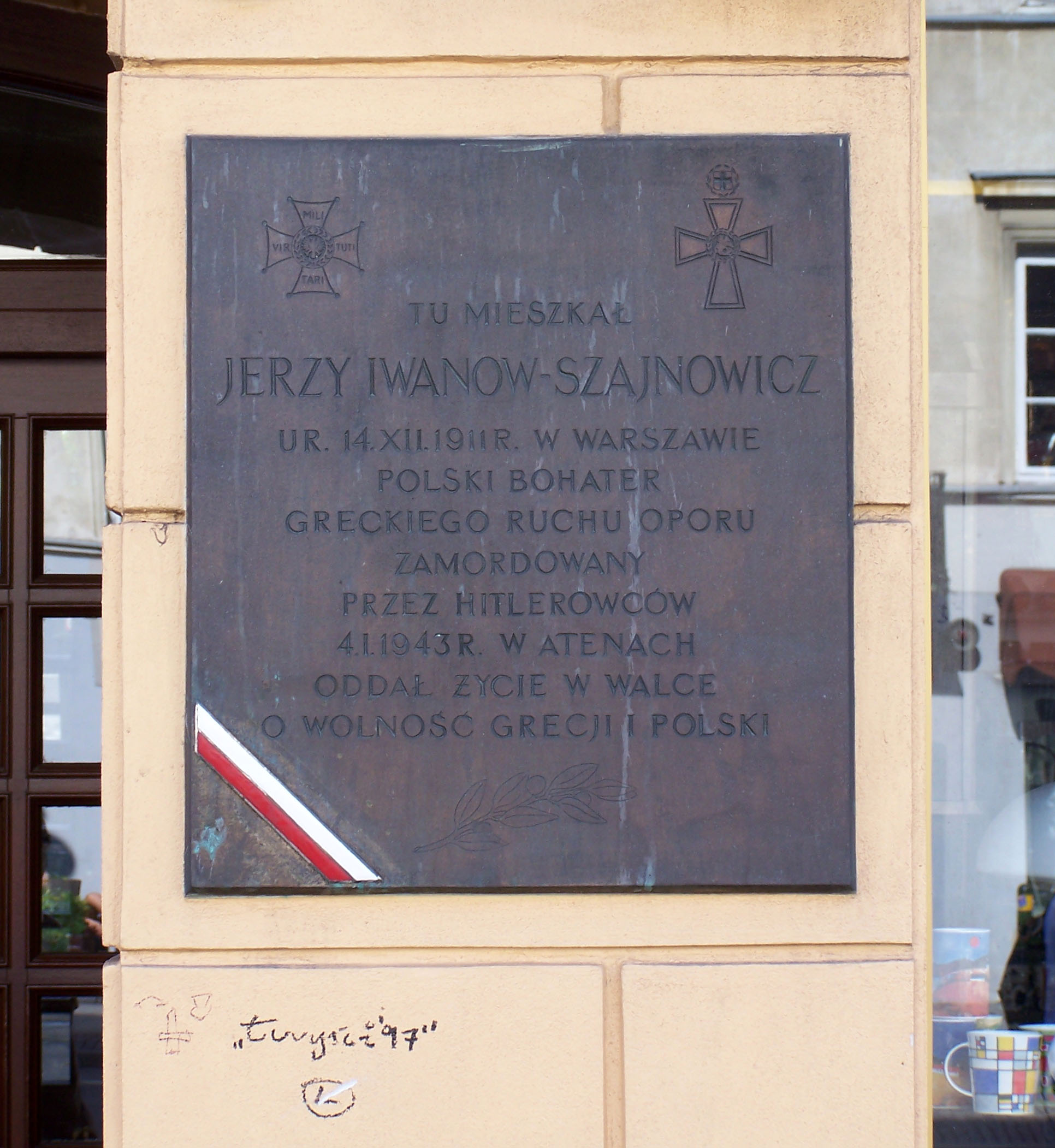
Memorial plaque at the house Iwanow lived in Warsaw

On 5 December 1944, Field Marshal Harold Alexander, Allied Commander-in-Chief in the Mediterranean, sent a diploma of thanks to his mother, while on 30 March 1945, the Polish government in exile honoured Iwanow with the Virtuti Militari cross. On 5 March 1962 he was decorated by the British government for his service with the Polish forceswith the War Medal and on 25 May 1976, he was awarded the highest Greek medal for gallantry, the Cross of Valour in Gold. In 1972, his life was made into a movie in the Polish People's Republic, as Agent Nr. 1.

In Greece, his memory is further honoured by a statue in Thessaloniki, as well as an annual swimming competition held since 1953, the "Ivanofeia". His former sports club, Iraklis, has named the Ivanofeio Indoor Hall in his honour.

In April 2021, Poland issued a postal stamp honoring Iwanow, which was initiated by the Polish-Greek Parliamentary Group.

== Movie ==
In 1971, the Polish film "Agent No. 1", directed by Zbigniew Kuźmiński, was premiered, in which Karol Strasburger played the role of Jerzy Iwanow-Szajnowicz.
