= Tasos Cook =

Greek-American basketball player (born 2002)

No. 1 – Iraklis Thessaloniki
- Position: Point guard
- League: Greek Basketball League; FIBA Europe Cup

Personal information
- Born: December 12, 2002 (age 23) Westerville, Ohio, U.S.
- Listed height: 6 ft 2 in (1.88 m)
- Listed weight: 201 lb (91 kg)

Career information
- High school: Westerville Central (Westerville, Ohio)
- College: Stetson (2021–2022); Vincennes (2022–2023); Campbell (2023–2026)
- NBA draft: 2026: undrafted
- Playing career: 2026–present

Career history
- 2026–present: Iraklis Thessaloniki

Tasos Lamont Cook (Greek: Τάσος Κουκ; born December 12, 2002) is a Greek-American professional basketball player for Iraklis Thessaloniki of the Greek Basketball League (GBL) and the FIBA Europe Cup. He is a 1.88 m (6 ft 2 in) tall guard who can play the point guard and shooting guard positions.

== Early life ==
Cook was born in Westerville, Ohio, United States. He is of Greek descent through his mother, whose family originates from Drama, Greece. He attended Westerville Central High School, where he earned All-Ohio honors and was named Ohio Division I Player of the Year.

== High school career ==
Cook attended Westerville Central High School in Westerville, Ohio, where he developed into one of the state's top guards. During his senior season, he averaged 21.0 points, 5.0 assists, and 4.0 rebounds per game, earning First Team All-Ohio honors and being named the Ohio Division I Co-Player of the Year. He finished his high school career as one of the leading scorers in school history.

== College career ==
=== Stetson (2021–2022) ===
Cook began his collegiate career with Stetson Hatters, appearing in 28 games as a freshman during the 2021–22 season. He averaged 3.4 points, 1.3 rebounds, and 1.0 assists per game while competing in the ASUN Conference.

=== Vincennes (2022–2023) ===
Following his freshman season, Cook transferred to Vincennes University. During the 2022–23 season, he averaged 10.9 points, 4.2 assists, and 2.8 rebounds per game. He helped Vincennes reach the NJCAA national tournament and earned All-Region 24 recognition.

=== Campbell (2023–2026) ===
In 2023, Cook transferred to Campbell University and joined the Campbell Fighting Camels. Over three seasons with the program, he became a key backcourt player and team captain. As a senior during the 2025–26 season, Cook averaged 7.2 points, 2.0 rebounds, and 1.2 assists per game while helping Campbell compete in the CAA. He concluded his collegiate career with more than 120 NCAA Division I appearances across Stetson and Campbell.

=== College statistics ===
| Season | School | GP | PPG | RPG | APG |
|---|---|---|---|---|---|
| 2021–22 | Stetson | 28 | 3.4 | 1.3 | 1.0 |
| 2022–23 | Vincennes | 31 | 10.9 | 2.8 | 4.2 |
| 2023–24 | Campbell | 32 | 4.8 | 1.7 | 0.9 |
| 2024–25 | Campbell | 31 | 6.5 | 1.9 | 1.1 |
| 2025–26 | Campbell | 33 | 7.2 | 2.0 | 1.2 |

== Professional career ==
On May 14, 2026, Cook signed a two-year contract with Iraklis Thessaloniki, joining the club for the 2026–27 Greek Basketball League season. The signing marked his first professional contract.
