= G.S. Iraklis Thessaloniki (men's basketball) =

Men's basketball team in Greece

Iraklis
- Nickname: Γηραιός (Elder); Ημίθεος (Demigod)
- Leagues: Greek Basketball League; FIBA Europe Cup
- Founded: 1921; 105 years ago
- Arena: Ivanofeio Sports Arena
- Capacity: 2,580
- Location: Thessaloniki, Greece
- Team colors: Blue, White
- Main sponsor: Novibet
- CEO: Georgios Pantazopoulos
- President: Georgios Pantazopoulos
- Vice-president: Pavlos Tsakiris
- Team manager: Giorgos Michalopoulos
- Head coach: Zoran Lukić
- Assistants: Sotirios Karapostolou; Stavros Evgeniadis
- Team captain: Cleveland Melvin
- Ownership: Anastasios Digas; Panteleimon Gianniris; Pavlos Tsakiris; Konstantinos Moraitis; Christos Goulios
- Championships: 2 Greek Championships
- Website: iraklis-bc.gr

Iraklis B.C. is a Greek professional basketball club based in the city of Thessaloniki, Macedonia, Greece. Created in 1921, it serves as the professional men's basketball department of the multisports club of G.S. Iraklis Thessalonikis. The club's colors are blue and white, inspired by the flag of Greece. They play their home matches at Ivanofeio Sports Arena. As of 2025, the club competes in the first–tier level Greek Basketball League (GBL) and, for the 2026–27 season, the FIBA Europe Cup.

Iraklis Thessaloniki won the Greek National Championship in 1928 and 1935, and also reached the Greek Cup final three times. Some of the greatest players in Greek, European and worldwide basketball have played for Iraklis Thessaloniki over the years including: Lefteris Kakiousis, Jure Zdovc, James Donaldson, David Ancrum, Walter Berry, Xavier McDaniel, Roy Tarpley, Nikos Chatzivrettas, Vasily Karasev, Lazaros Papadopoulos, Dimitris Diamantidis and Sofoklis Schortsanitis.

== History ==
The parent sporting club of G.S. Iraklis Thessalonikis was founded on 29 November 1908, and initially featured football. The club was named after Heracles (or Hercules), the mythical Greek demigod. The basketball team of Iraklis was established in 1921.

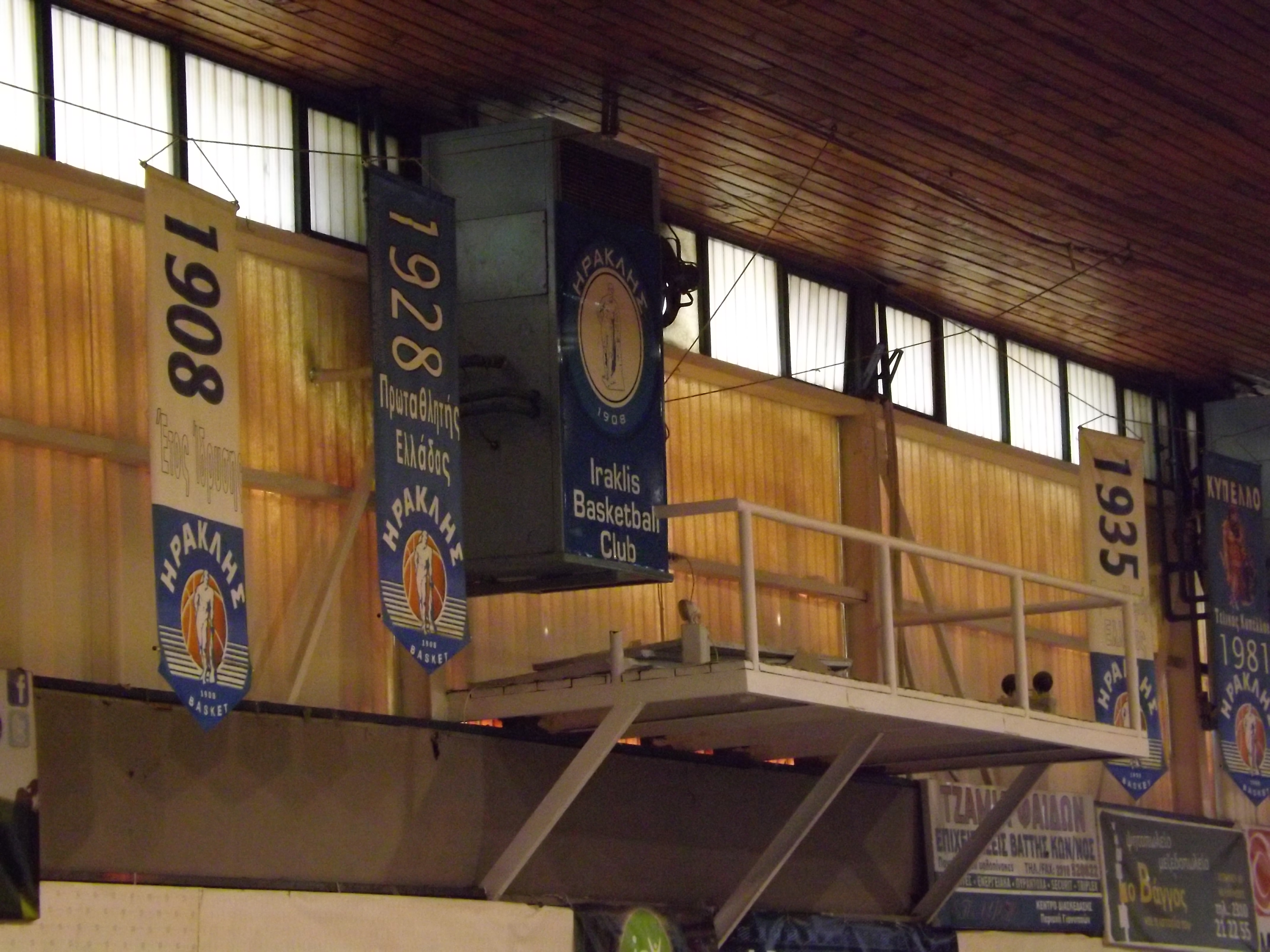
Iraklis won the inaugural Greek Championship in 1928, and won it again, in 1935.

Iraklis won the inaugural Greek League championship in 1928. To win the championship, Iraklis had to eliminate A.E.K. and Near East, before beating V.A.O. in the championship game. The team won its second Greek championship in 1935. Also in the team's history, Iraklis has thrice finished in second place in the Greek Championship (1936, 1962, and 1964), twice been a Greek Cup finalist (1981, 1994, and 1996), and twice made it to the semifinals of the European 2nd-tier level league Cup Winners Cup.

Iraklis reached the semifinals of the 1994–95 FIBA European Cup, where they competed against Taugrés. Iraklis won the first game 79–78, but lost the next two games, to be eliminated 2–1 in a best of three series. In 1996, an Iraklis team led by former N.B.A. players Xavier McDaniel and Roy Tarpley, reached the Greek Cup Final Four. By beating Apollon Patra in the semifinal, Iraklis reached the final, where it then lost 85–74 to Panathinaikos. Iraklis has also twice competed in the top European continental competitions. The club played in the European top-tier level European Champions Cup in the 1995–96 season, and also competed in the FIBA SuproLeague during the 2000–01 season.

In 2006, Iraklis was relegated to the A2 National Division, after finishing 13th in the first-tier Greek League. In 2010, after four seasons in the second-tier level A2 National Division, the team was promoted back up to the top-tier Greek League. After one season in the Greek top-tier level, Iraklis was again relegated down to the A2 National Division, with two matches left in the season. At the end of the season, Iraklis chose to play in the third-tier level of Greek basketball, the B National Division, in order to clear its debts. The club was promoted to the A2 National Division in 2013, after finishing 2nd in its group, and after Peristeri failed to receive financial clearance to participate in the league.

In the 2018–19 season, Iraklis won the promotion playoffs of the Greek A2 League, and was promoted up to the top level Greek League, for the first time in 8 years. During the 2019–20 season, Iraklis is taking part in the Greek League organized by the Hellenic Basketball Federation. The season started in October 2019 and was scheduled to end in June 2020. However, due to the coronavirus pandemic, the championship was terminated earlier. Iraklis took the 7th place with 29 points, having 9 wins and 11 losses in a total of 20 games. In the 2020–21 season, Iraklis returned to European competitions, taking part in the qualifying round of the Basketball Champions League and later on in the 2020–21 FIBA Europe Cup where the club reached the Top16 round having 3 wins and 1 loss. In the 2020–21 season Iraklis took the 10th place with 29 points, having 7 wins and 15 losses in a total of 22 games.

== Home arena ==
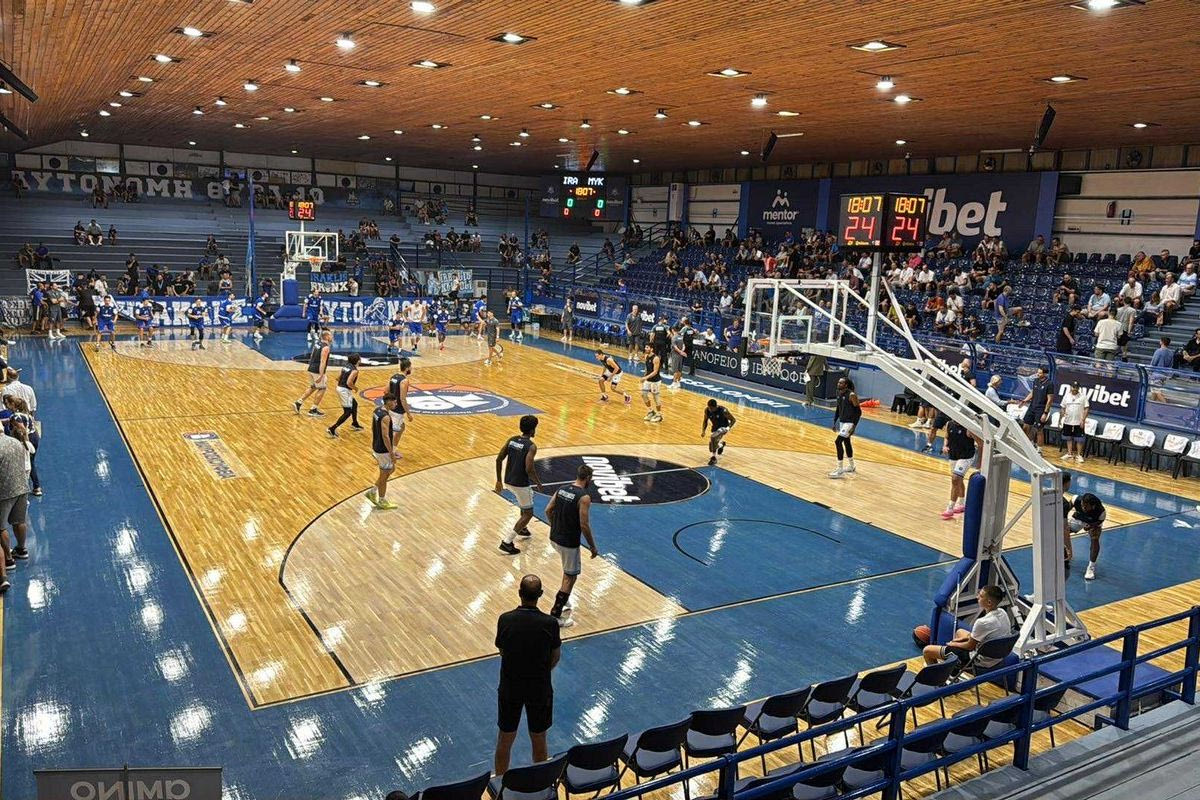
Ivanofeio Sports Arena

Iraklis currently plays its home games in the Ivanofeio Sports Arena, an arena with a seating capacity of 2,580. The arena opened in 1987, and it was expanded to its current capacity in 2025. Ivanofeio is situated in the Thessaloniki city center, and it is owned by the multi-sport club G.S. Iraklis Thessaloniki.

== Supporters ==
The most prominent supporters' club of the team is Aftonomi Thira 10 (meaning Autonomous Gate 10), a fan club with a total of 15 branches in Northern Greece. The fan club is known for holding an antiracist stance, as it participates in the Ultras Antiracist Festival. Other activities of the fan club include the publication of a magazine, and the conducting of an annual festival. Other minor supporters' clubs are SFISE, Blue Boys, A.P.A.T.S.I., and Iraklis Fan Club of Athens. In a 2013 opinion poll, Iraklis was ranked as the 6th most popular basketball club in Greece, gathering 2.8% of the participating supporters' votes.

== Honours ==
=== European competitions ===
- FIBA Saporta Cup
  - Semifinalists (2): 1994–95, 1996–97

=== Domestic competitions ===
- Greek Championship
  - Champions (2): 1927–28, 1934–35
  - Runners-up (3): 1935–36, 1961–62, 1963–64
- Greek Cup
  - Runners-up (3): 1980–81, 1993–94, 1995–96
- Greek Second Division
  - Champions (2): 1974–75, 1977–78

== Players ==
=== Current roster ===
Note: Flags indicate national team eligibility at FIBA-sanctioned events. Players may hold other non-FIBA nationalities not displayed.

Iraklis B.C. roster
Players
Coaches

Pos.	No.	Nat.	Name	Ht.	Wt.	Age
PG	0	(United States)	Lecque, Jalen	1.93 m (6 ft 4 in)	84 kg (185 lb)	26 – 13 June 2000
PG	1	(United States) (Greece)	Cook, Tasos	1.88 m (6 ft 2 in)	91 kg (201 lb)	23 – 12 December 2002
PF	2	(United States)	Melvin, Cleveland (C)	2.03 m (6 ft 8 in)	93 kg (205 lb)	35 – 25 June 1991
SF	3	(United States)	Styles, Dontrez	1.98 m (6 ft 6 in)	95 kg (209 lb)	24 – 26 June 2002
PF	5	(United Kingdom) (United States)	Horchler, Noah	2.04 m (6 ft 8 in)	88 kg (194 lb)	32 – 27 February 1994
C	8	(United States)	Forrester, Jake	2.07 m (6 ft 9 in)	102 kg (225 lb)	27 – 1 January 1999
SG	10	(United States)	Diarra, Hassan	1.87 m (6 ft 2 in)	86 kg (190 lb)	25 – 17 March 2001
PF	13	(Greece)	Slaftsakis, Diamantis	2.01 m (6 ft 7 in)	88 kg (194 lb)	32 – 27 July 1994
SF	16	(Canada) (Greece)	Syllas, Cole	1.96 m (6 ft 5 in)	95 kg (209 lb)	26 – 1 August 2000
SF	19	(Greece)	Arnokouros, Giorgos	2.01 m (6 ft 7 in)		25 – 10 December 2000
PG	56	(Greece)	Mastrogiannopoulos, Sarantis	1.90 m (6 ft 3 in)	87 kg (192 lb)	28 – 3 December 1997
PF	72	(Greece)	Giannikos, Marios	2.02 m (6 ft 8 in)		19 – 20 February 2007
PF	77	(Greece)	Stavrakopoulos, Sotiris	2.03 m (6 ft 8 in)	95 kg (209 lb)	21 – 29 November 2004
SG	95	(Greece)	Komnianidis, Alexandros	1.92 m (6 ft 4 in)		19 – 19 October 2007
SG		(Greece)	Liapis, Michail	1.92 m (6 ft 4 in)	84 kg (185 lb)	31 – 11 March 1995

Head coach

- (Serbia) Zoran Lukić

Assistant coach(es)

- (Greece) Sotirios Karapostolou
- (Greece) Stavros Evgeniadis

Athletic trainer(s)

- (Greece) Dimitris Doxakis

Physician(s)

- (Greece) Dimitris Giannakovitis

Physiotherapist(s)

- (Greece) Ioakeim Chatziignatiadis

Team manager

- (Greece) Giorgos Michalopoulos

Legend

- (C) Team captain
- Injured

- Roster
Updated: November 21, 2026

=== Depth chart ===
Pos.	Starting 5	Bench 1	Bench 2
C	Jake Forrester*	Noah Horchler*	Sotiris Stavrakopoulos
PF	Cleveland Melvin*	Diamantis Slaftsakis	Marios Giannikos
SF	Dontrez Styles*	Cole Syllas	Giorgos Arnokouros
SG	Jalen Lecque*	Michail Liapis	Alexandros Komnianidis
PG	Hassan Diarra*	Sarantis Mastrogiannopoulos	Tasos Cook

Notes: a) According to Greek Basketball League regulations, a team can have up to 8 foreign players on its roster, while up to 6 can participate in each game, b) Players who have acquired Greek nationality are not considered foreigners, c) Foreign players are shown with an asterisk (*).

== Notable players ==
Note: Flags indicate national team eligibility at FIBA-sanctioned events. Players may hold other non-FIBA nationalities not displayed.

Criteria

To appear in this section a player must have either:

- Set a club record or won an individual award while at the club
- Played at least one official international match for their national team at any time
- Played at least one official NBA match at any time.

- (United States) David Ancrum (1987–92)
- (Greece) Vangelis Angelou (1995–96)
- (United States) Walter Berry (1994–95)
- (United States) (Bulgaria) Roderick Blakney (2001–02)
- (United States) Steve Burtt Sr. (1995)
- (United Kingdom) Steve Bucknall (1996–98, 2002–04)
- (Greece) Nikos Chatzivrettas (1997–02)
- (Greece) Dimitris Diamantidis (1999–04)
- (United States) Byron Dinkins (1998–00)
- (United States) (Italy) Mike DiNunno (2015–16)
- (United Kingdom) (United States) James Donaldson (1993–94)
- (United States) Toney Douglas (2021–22)
- (United States) (Belgium) Justin Hamilton (2004–05)
- (Canada) Olivier Hanlan (2019–21)
- (Greece) Savvas Iliadis (2002–05, 2011)
- (United States) Buck Johnson (1998–00)
- (Greece) Lefteris Kakiousis
  (1987–97)
- (Greece) Dimitris Kalaitzidis (2002–05, 2016–20)
- (Greece) Georgios Karagkoutis (2000–02)
- (Russia) Vasily Karasev (2000–01)
- (Greece) Takis Karatzoulidis (1971–85)
- (Greece) Manthos Katsoulis (1990–93)
- (Greece) Vassilis Kavvadas (2019–21)
- (United States) Mike King (2006)
- (United States) Xavier McDaniel (1995–96)
- (United States) Erik Meek (1996–97, 2001–02)
- (Greece) (Serbia) Igor Milošević (2003–05)
- (Greece) Aristeidis Moumoglou (1960–67, 1970–72)
- (Greece) Dimitris Papadopoulos (1985–94, 1996–97)
- (Greece) Lazaros Papadopoulos (1996–01, 2003–04)
- (United States) Smush Parker (2011)
- (Greece) Michalis Polytarchou (2018–19)
- (Greece) (Serbia) Vladimir Petrović-Stergiou (2009–11)
- (Greece) Sotiris Sakellariou (1971–84)
- (Greece) Sofoklis Schortsanitis (2000–03)
- (United States) Charles Smith (1997)
- (Greece) Nikos Stavropoulos (1992–94)
- (United States) Roy Tarpley (1996)
- (United States) Brooks Thompson (1997)
- (Greece) Christos Tsekos (1986–92)
- (Slovenia) Jure Zdovc (1993–96)

== Head coaches ==
Nationality	Head coach	From	To	Honours
(Greece)	Soulis Markopoulos	1987	1990	
(Greece) (United States)	Steve Giatzoglou	1990; 1996	1992; 1996	Greek Cup Finalist 1996
(Greece)	Theodoros Rodopoulos	1992	1992	
(United States)	Chico Averbuck	1992	1992	
(United States)	Johnny Neumann	1992	1993	
(Serbia) (Greece)	Dragan Šakota	1993; 1998	1994; 2000	Greek Cup Finalist 1994
(Slovenia) (Greece)	Slobodan Subotić	1994	1996	
(United States)	Tom Newell	1996	1996	
(Serbia)	Zoran Slavnić	1997	1997	
(Greece)	Vangelis Alexandris	1997; Oct 2015	1998; Jan 2018	
(Greece)	Makis Dendrinos	2000	2000	
(Greece)	Lefteris Kakiousis	2002; 2009	2005; 2010	A2 National Division Runner–up 2010
(Slovenia)	Jure Zdovc	2005	2006	
(Greece)	Kostas Mexas	2010; Oct 2018; Nov 2021	2010; Jul 2019; May 2022	Greek A2 League Runner–up 2019
(Serbia)	Darko Ruso	Nov 2010	Jan 2011	
(Greece)	Georgios Kalafatakis	Jan 2011	Feb 2011	
(Greece)	Chris Chougkaz	Feb 2011	Sep 2011	
(Greece)	Makis Kalantaridis	Sep 2011	Oct 2011	
(Greece)	Thodoris Albanis	Oct 2011	Mar 2012	
(Greece)	Dimitris Vatos	Mar 2012	Jul 2012	
(Greece)	Thomas Kostopoulos	Jul 2012	Jul 2013	
(Greece)	Dimitris Tsolakis	Jul 2013	Sep 2013	
(Greece)	Stefanos Perkos	Sep 2013	Apr 2014	
(Greece)	Giorgos Kyroudis	Apr 2014	Nov 2014	
(Greece)	Giannis Damalis	Nov 2014	Mar 2015	
(Greece)	Stefanos Perkos	Mar 2015	Oct 2015	
(Greece)	Lefteris Chatzikyriakidis	Jan 2018	Oct 2018	
(Greece)	Ioannis Kastritis	Jul 2019	Jan 2020	
(Greece)	Ilias Kantzouris	Jan 2020	Jul 2020	
(Greece)	Vangelis Ziagkos	Jul 2020	Dec 2020	
(Greece)	Stergios Kalyvas	Dec 2020	Feb 2021	
(Greece)	Thanasis Skourtopoulos	Feb 2021	Oct 2021	
(Greece)	Pantelis Boutskos	Oct 2021	Oct 2021	
(Greece)	Stergios Koufos	Oct 2021	Nov 2021	

== See also ==
- Iraklis B.C. in international competitions
- Ivanofeio Sports Arena
- G.S. Iraklis Thessaloniki
- Iraklis F.C. (Thessaloniki)
- List of Iraklis Thessaloniki F.C. players
- List of Iraklis F.C. seasons
- G.S. Iraklis Thessaloniki (women's basketball)
- G.S. Iraklis Thessaloniki (men's volleyball)
- G.S. Iraklis Thessaloniki (women's volleyball)
- G.S. Iraklis Thessaloniki (water polo)
- G.S. Iraklis Thessaloniki (rugby)
