= G.S. Iraklis Thessaloniki (women's volleyball) =

Women's volleyball team in Greece

G.S. Iraklis Thessalonikis
- Full name: Γυμναστικός Σύλλογος Θεσσαλονίκης «Ηρακλής»; Gymnastikos Syllogos Thessalonikis "Iraklis"; (Thessaloniki Gymnastic Club "Heracles")
- Nickname: Γηραιός (Elder); Ημίθεος (Demigod)
- Founded: 1926; 100 years ago
- Ground: Katsaneio Indoor Hall (Capacity: 350)
- Chairman: Ephraim Kyrizidis
- Manager: Giannis Tsairelis
- League: Pre League
- 2025–26: A2 National Division, 1st of 10 (promoted)
- Website: iraklis.club/volley-gynaikon

G.S. Iraklis Thessalonikis is a volleyball team based in Thessaloniki, Macedonia, Greece. Founded in 1926, it serves as the women's volleyball section of the multisports club of G.S. Iraklis Thessalonikis. The team's colors are blue and white. They play their home matches at Katsaneio Indoor Hall. As of 2026, the team competes in the second–tier Pre League.

In the 2022–2023 season, Iraklis Thessaloniki won the championship of A Thessaloniki Amateur Championship, which is on the first tier regionally and on the fifth tier nationally. In the 2023–2024 season, Iraklis Thessaloniki won the championship of B National Division, which is on the fourth tier nationally. In the 2025–2026 season, Iraklis Thessaloniki won the championship of A2 National Division, which is on the third tier nationally.

== See also ==
- G.S. Iraklis Thessaloniki
- Iraklis F.C. (Thessaloniki)
- List of Iraklis Thessaloniki F.C. players
- List of Iraklis F.C. seasons
- G.S. Iraklis Thessaloniki (men's basketball)
- Iraklis B.C. in international competitions
- G.S. Iraklis Thessaloniki (women's basketball)
- Ivanofeio Sports Arena
- G.S. Iraklis Thessaloniki (men's volleyball)
- G.S. Iraklis Thessaloniki (water polo)
- G.S. Iraklis Thessaloniki (rugby)
