= List of Iraklis Thessaloniki F.C. players =

Players of men's association football team

This is a list of notable footballers who have played for Iraklis F.C. in Greece. Generally, this means players that have played 100 or more first-class matches for the club. A number of other players who have played an important role in a title win can also be included for their contribution. Club captains and seasonal top goalscorers are included. Players in Iraklis' early history are also included despite not necessarily playing 100 matches.

For a list of all Iraklis players, major or minor, with a Wikipedia article, see Category:Iraklis F.C. (Thessaloniki) players, and for the current squad see the main Iraklis Thessaloniki F.C. article.

Players are listed according to the date of their first team debut. Appearances and goals are for first-team competitive matches only. Substitute appearances included.

Name	Nationality	Position	Iraklis career	Appearances	Goals	Notes
Alberto Nahmias	(Israel) (Greece)	FW	1923–1933	?	?	Scored Greece's first goal ever.
Kostas Karapatis	(Greece)	GK	1946–1951, 1957–1961	?	0	
Lolos Hasekidis	(Greece)	FW	1955–1962, 1966–1967	?	?	
Zacharias Chaliabalias	(Greece)	MF	1963–1975	280	?	
Kostas Aidiniou	(Greece)	MF	1964–1974, 1978–1979	232	57	1970–71, 1971–72, 1972–73 club's top goalscorer
Aristotelis Batakis	(Greece)	MF	1966–1975	261	?	
Makis Sentelidis	(Greece)	DF	1966–1978	312	6	
Takis Nikoloudis	(Greece)	MF	1968–1976	233	?	
Grigoris Fanaras	(Greece)	GK	1968–1982	244	?	
Grigoris Zafiridis	(Greece)	DF	1969–1976	214	?	
Vangelis Kousoulakis	(Greece)	MF	1971–1979	203	7	
Dimitrios Gesios	(Greece)	FW	1972–1980	211	75	All-time leader in league goals, 1973–74, 1975–76, 1976–77, 1977–78 club's top goalscorer
Charalampos Xanthopoulos	(Greece)	FW	1974–1987	283	14	
Vasilis Hatzipanagis	(Greece)	MF	1975–1991	281	61	Greece's Golden Player
Lakis Papaioannou	(Greece)	MF	1979–1986	179	36	1985–86 club's top goalscorer
Savvas Kofidis	(Greece)	MF	1981–1988, 1997–1999	275	21	
Daniil Papadopoulos	(Greece)	DF/MF/FW	1981–1998	419	64	All-time leader in league appearances
Sigurður Grétarsson	(Iceland)	FW	1984–1985	26	10	Scored in the final of the 1985 Balkans Cup win, 1984–85 club's top goalscorer
Tasos Lefkopoulos	(Greece)	DF	1984–1991	140	1	
Pagonis Vakalopoulos	(Greece)	DF	1984–1995	163	8	
Giorgos Papadopoulos	(Greece)	DF/MF	1985–1997	225	18	
Sakis Anastasiadis	(Greece)	MF	1986–1993	171	28	1986–87, 1987–88 club's top goalscorer
Fanis Toutziaris	(Greece)	FW	1987–1995	238	62	1993–94 club's top goalscorer
Thanasis Dimopoulos	(Greece)	FW	1988–1992	134	50	1988–89, 1989–90 and 1991–92 club's top goalscorer
Georgios Plitsis	(Greece)	GK	1988–1996	156	0	
Christos Kostis	(Greece)	FW	1989–1994	110	24	1992–93 club's top goalscorer
Ivan Jovanović	(Serbia) (Greece)	MF	1989–1999	271	52	1996–97 club's top goalscorer
Predrag Erak	(Bosnia and Herzegovina) (Serbia)	DF	1991–1995	100	4	
Georgios Anatolakis	(Greece)	DF	1992–1996	134	4	
Nikos Sakellaridis	(Greece)	DF	1992–1996	111	10	
Georgios Kostis	(Greece)	MF	1992–1999	171	9	
Ieroklis Stoltidis	(Greece)	MF	1992–2003	234	33	
Sotiris Konstantinidis	(Greece)	MF	1994–1999	110	14	
Georgios Xenidis	(Greece)	DF	1995–2001, 2002–2004	195	18	
Marios Christodoulou	(Cyprus)	FW	1995–1999	102	10	
Nikos Mirtsekis	(Greece)	FW	1995–1997	62	31	1994–95 and 1995–96 club's top goalscorer
Georgios Kyriazis	(Greece)	DF	1996–2003, 2010–2011	188	9	
Lazaros Semos	(Greece)	DF	1997–2000	107	9	
Michalis Konstantinou	(Cyprus)	FW	1997–2001, 2008	165	84	1997–98, 1998–99, 1999–00 and 2000–01 club's top goalscorer
Ebenezer Hagan	(Ghana)	MF	1998–2003	179	18	
Ederson Fofonka	(Brazil)	FW	2000–2004	124	43	2001–02 club's top goalscorer
Konstantinos Nebegleras	(Greece)	MF	2000–2004	128	5	
Panagiotis Drougas	(Greece)	DF	2000–2007	146	1	
Georgios Abaris	(Greece)	GK	2001–2007	114	0	
Grigoris Papazacharias	(Greece)	DF	2001–2010	126	3	
Anastasios Katsabis	(Greece)	DF	2002–2011	249	11	Club's captain 2006–2011
Mirosław Sznaucner	(Poland)	DF	2003–2007	109	0	
Ilias Poursanidis	(Greece)	MF	2003–2008	143	2	
Joël Epalle	(Cameroon)	MF	2005–2007, 2011	69	21	Club's captain 2005–2006, 2005–06 club's top goalscorer
Manolis Papasterianos	(Greece)	MF	2006–2011	104	5	
Victoraș Iacob	(Romania)	FW	2009–2011	41	13	2009–10 club's top goalscorer
Paschalis Voutsias	(Greece)	MF	2009–2011, 2012–2014	30	2	Scored the 2,000th goal of Iraklis in top-tier league
Huanderson	(Brazil)	GK	2012–2017	150	0	
Emanuel Perrone	(Argentina)	FW	2014–2017, 2018–2019	106	37	
Taianan	(Brazil)	MF	2013–2014, 2018–2020	57	16	
Petros Kanakoudis	(Greece)	DF	2010–2011, 2018–2021	41	9	

== See also ==
- Iraklis F.C. (Thessaloniki)
- List of Iraklis F.C. seasons
- G.S. Iraklis Thessaloniki
- G.S. Iraklis Thessaloniki (men's basketball)
- Iraklis B.C. in international competitions
- G.S. Iraklis Thessaloniki (women's basketball)
- Ivanofeio Sports Arena
- G.S. Iraklis Thessaloniki (men's volleyball)
- G.S. Iraklis Thessaloniki (women's volleyball)
- G.S. Iraklis Thessaloniki (water polo)
- G.S. Iraklis Thessaloniki (rugby)
