= Norbert Witkowski =

Polish footballer

Personal information
- Full name: Norbert Witkowski
- Date of birth: 5 August 1981 (age 45)
- Place of birth: Olsztyn, Poland
- Height: 1.90 m (6 ft 3 in)
- Position: Goalkeeper

Senior career*
Years	Team	Apps	(Gls)
1999–2001	Stomil Olsztyn	0	(0)
2002	Polonia Lidzbark Warmiński		
2002–2003	Stomil Olsztyn	16	(0)
2003–2004	Stasiak Opoczno	10	(0)
2004–2005	Drwęca Nowe Miasto Lubawskie		
2005–2010	Arka Gdynia	112	(0)
2011	Iraklis	1	(0)
2012–2014	Górnik Zabrze	10	(0)
- * Club domestic league appearances and goals

Norbert Witkowski (born 5 August 1981) is a Polish former professional footballer who played as a goalkeeper.

== Club career ==
=== Early career ===
He previously played for Stomil Olsztyn, Polonia Lidzbark Warmiński, Stasiak Opoczno and Drwęca Nowe Miasto Lubawskie.

=== Arka Gdynia ===
He made his Ekstraklasa debut in a 1–1 draw against Amica Wronki on 15 October 2005.

=== Iraklis ===
On 24 January 2011, he signed a one-and-a-half-year contract with Super League Greece club Iraklis.
