= G.S. Iraklis Thessaloniki (women's basketball) =

Women's basketball team in Greece

G.S. Iraklis Thessalonikis
- Nickname: Γηραιός (Elder); Ημίθεος (Demigod)
- Leagues: Greek Women's National League
- Founded: 1926; 100 years ago
- Arena: Ivanofeio Sports Arena
- Capacity: 2,580
- Location: Thessaloniki, Greece
- Team colors: Blue; White
- President: Ephraim Kyrizidis
- Head coach: Michalis Tsaikos
- Assistant: Nikoleta Mpalla
- Championships: 4 Greek Championships
- Website: iraklis.club/gynaikeio-basket

G.S. Iraklis Thessalonikis is the women's basketball team of the multisports club of G.S. Iraklis Thessalonikis based in the city of Thessaloniki, Macedonia, Greece. The club's colours are blue and white, inspired by the flag of Greece. They play their home matches at Ivanofeio Sports Arena. As of 2026, the club competes in the third–tier level Greek Women's National League.

== History ==
G.S. Iraklis Thessalonikis was the first champion of the Greek League, in 1967. Iraklis Thessalonikis won 3 more championships, in 1968, 1971 and 1972. However, in the following years the club was weakened. In the 2018–2019 season, Iraklis Thessalonikis finished in the second-last place in A1 National Division and was relegated to A2 National Division. In the 2022–2023 season, Iraklis Thessalonikis won the championship of A2 National Division.

== Honours ==
- Greek Championship
  - Champions (4): 1967, 1968, 1970, 1971

== Home arena ==
Iraklis currently plays its home games in the Ivanofeio Sports Arena, an arena with a seating capacity of 2,580. The arena opened in 1987, and it was expanded to its current capacity in 2025. Ivanofeio is situated in the Thessaloniki city center, and it is owned by the multi-sport club G.S. Iraklis Thessaloniki.

== See also ==
- Ivanofeio Sports Arena
- G.S. Iraklis Thessaloniki
- Iraklis F.C. (Thessaloniki)
- List of Iraklis Thessaloniki F.C. players
- List of Iraklis F.C. seasons
- G.S. Iraklis Thessaloniki (men's basketball)
- Iraklis B.C. in international competitions
- G.S. Iraklis Thessaloniki (men's volleyball)
- G.S. Iraklis Thessaloniki (women's volleyball)
- G.S. Iraklis Thessaloniki (water polo)
- G.S. Iraklis Thessaloniki (rugby)
