= Ivanofeio Sports Arena =

Basketball arena in Greece

Coordinates: 40°38′N 22°58′E

- Ιβανώφειο Κλειστό Γυμναστήριο
- Ναός (Temple)
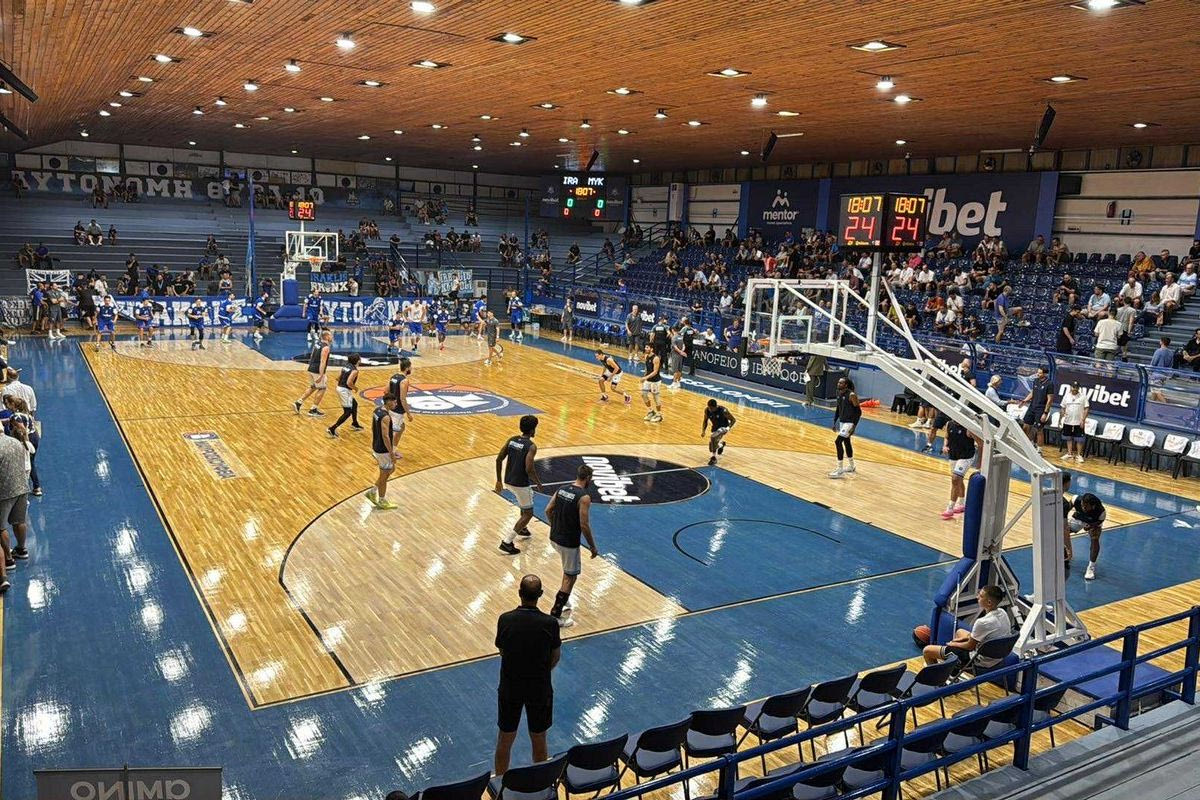
- The interior of Ivanofio
- Interactive map of Ivanofeio Sports Arena
- Full name: Ivanofio Klisto Gymnastirio; (Ivanofio Indoor Hall)
- Location: Thessaloniki, Greece
- Owner: G.S. Iraklis Thessalonikis
- Operator: G.S. Iraklis Thessalonikis (men); G.S. Iraklis Thessalonikis (women)
- Capacity: 2,580
- Surface: Parquet
- Scoreboard: Yes
- Public transit: O.A.S.TH. (17, 37): Stop "Kaftanzoglio"; Thessaloniki Metro: Metro Station "Panepistimio"

Construction
- Built: 1987
- Opened: 1987
- Renovated: 1991, 2025
- Expanded: 1991, 2025

Tenants
- G.S. Iraklis Thessalonikis (men) (1987–present); G.S. Iraklis Thessalonikis (women) (1987–present); A.S. Aris Thessalonikis (men) (2003–2004)

Website
- iraklis.club/egkatastaseis

Ivanofio Klisto Gymnastirio (Greek: Ιβανώφειο Κλειστό Γυμναστήριο, lit. 'Ivanofio Indoor Hall', Greek pronunciation: [iva'nofio klis'to ɣimnas'tiɾio]) is a basketball arena that is located in Thessaloniki, Greece. Its capacity is 2,580 spectators. It is used as the home arena of the men's and women's basketball teams of the multisports club of G.S. Iraklis Thessalonikis.

== Location ==
Ivanofio Indoor Hall is located in the city centre of Thessaloniki, next to the campus of the Aristotle University of Thessaloniki. It can be accessed by bus lines 17 and 37, and metro lines 1 and 2.

== History ==
Ivanofio Indoor Hall opened in 1987, to host the games of Iraklis Thessaloniki. It is owned by G.S. Iraklis Thessalonikis, and was named after Jerzy Iwanow-Szajnowicz, a Polish athlete of G.S. Iraklis Thessalonikis, and a member of the Greek resistance, who was executed in 1943 in Athens by the Axis occupation forces. Expansion works took place in 1991, to increase the capacity from 1,300 to 2,580. Ivanofio has hosted games of the Greek Basketball League, the EuroLeague, the Korać Cup, and the Saporta Cup. Iraklis Thessaloniki fans refer to Ivanofio as "o Naos" (Greek: ο Ναός), which is Greek for "the Temple".

Apart from Iraklis Thessaloniki, Ivanofio hosted the home games of Aris Thessaloniki during the 2003–04 season. Ivanofio also hosts non-sports activities, such as music concerts.

== See also ==
- G.S. Iraklis Thessaloniki (men's basketball)
- Iraklis B.C. in international competitions
- G.S. Iraklis Thessaloniki (women's basketball)
- G.S. Iraklis Thessaloniki
- Iraklis F.C. (Thessaloniki)
- List of Iraklis Thessaloniki F.C. players
- List of Iraklis F.C. seasons
- G.S. Iraklis Thessaloniki (men's volleyball)
- G.S. Iraklis Thessaloniki (women's volleyball)
- G.S. Iraklis Thessaloniki (water polo)
- G.S. Iraklis Thessaloniki (rugby)
