= G.S. Iraklis Thessaloniki (rugby) =

Rugby team in Greece

Greece
- Full name: Γυμναστικός Σύλλογος Θεσσαλονίκης «Ηρακλής»; Gymnastikos Syllogos Thessalonikis "Iraklis"; (Thessaloniki Gymnastic Club "Heracles")
- Nicknames: Γηραιός (Elder); Ημίθεος (Demigod)
- Founded: 2004 (men); 2013 (women)
- Location: Thessaloniki, Greece
- President: Ephraim Kyrizidis
- Coach: Giorgi Adeishvili (women)
- League: Rugby Sevens Championship (women)
- 2025: Rugby Sevens Championship, 2nd of 4 (women)

Official website
- iraklis.club/category/ragkbi-gynaikon

G.S. Iraklis Thessalonikis is a rugby sevens team in Thessaloniki, Greece. As the name implies, it forms part of the multisports club of G.S. Iraklis Thessalonikis.

== Honours ==
=== Men ===
- Greek Rugby Union Championship
  - Winners (1): 2013
- Greek Rugby Sevens Championship
  - Winners (2): 2013, 2014

=== Women ===
- Greek Rugby Sevens Championship
  - Winners (2): 2014, 2024

== See also ==
- G.S. Iraklis Thessaloniki
- Iraklis F.C. (Thessaloniki)
- List of Iraklis Thessaloniki F.C. players
- List of Iraklis F.C. seasons
- G.S. Iraklis Thessaloniki (men's basketball)
- Iraklis B.C. in international competitions
- G.S. Iraklis Thessaloniki (women's basketball)
- Ivanofeio Sports Arena
- G.S. Iraklis Thessaloniki (men's volleyball)
- G.S. Iraklis Thessaloniki (women's volleyball)
- G.S. Iraklis Thessaloniki (water polo)
