= G.S. Iraklis Thessaloniki (water polo) =

Water polo team in Greece

G.S. Iraklis Thessalonikis
- Full name: Γυμναστικός Σύλλογος Θεσσαλονίκης «Ηρακλής»; Gymnastikos Syllogos Thessalonikis "Iraklis"; (Thessaloniki Gymnastic Club "Heracles")
- Nickname: Γηραιός (Elder); Ημίθεος (Demigod)
- Founded: 1924 (men); 1989 (women)
- League: A2 National Division (2nd tier) (men); A2 National Division (2nd tier) (women)
- Based in: Thessaloniki, Greece
- Arena: Thessaloniki Posidonio Swimming Pool
- Colours: Blue; White
- President: Ephraim Kyrizidis
- Head coach: Lambros Vogiatzoglou (men); Kostas Kapetanikolas (women)
- Website: iraklis.club/ydatosfairisi (men); iraklis.club/ydatosfairisi-gynaikon (women)

G.S. Iraklis Thessalonikis is the water polo team of the multisports club of G.S. Iraklis Thessalonikis based in Thessaloniki, Greece. It has got both men's and women's teams. As of 2025, the men's team plays in A2 National Division (2nd tier). As of 2023, the women's team plays in A2 National Division (2nd tier).

== Men's team ==
The men's water polo team was founded in 1924 and plays in A2 National Division (2nd tier). In the A2 National Division 2012–2013 season it finished in 5th place among six teams. Iraklis Thessaloniki was promoted to A1 National Division in the 2007–2008 season, when it won the first place in A2 National Division. In the 2008–2009 season it played in A1 National Division for last time, finishing in the last place. In the 2014–2015 season, Iraklis Thessaloniki played in B National Division and it won the rise in A2 National Division.

== Women's team ==
The women's water polo team was founded in 1989 and plays in A2 National Division (2nd tier). Iraklis Thessaloniki promoted to in A1 National Division in the 2007–2008 season, when it won the first place in A2 National Division. The most successful seasons were the 2012–2013 season and the 2013–2014 season, when the team finished in third place of the A1 National Division. In the 2014–2015 season played in A1 National Division for last time.

== Honours ==
=== Men ===
A2 National Division

- Winners (4): 1987, 2002, 2006, 2008

B National Division

- Winners (2): 1959, 1985

=== Women ===
A2 National Division

- Winners (1): 2008

B National Division

- Winners (1): 2005

== See also ==
- G.S. Iraklis Thessaloniki
- Iraklis F.C. (Thessaloniki)
- List of Iraklis Thessaloniki F.C. players
- List of Iraklis F.C. seasons
- G.S. Iraklis Thessaloniki (men's basketball)
- Iraklis B.C. in international competitions
- G.S. Iraklis Thessaloniki (women's basketball)
- Ivanofeio Sports Arena
- G.S. Iraklis Thessaloniki (men's volleyball)
- G.S. Iraklis Thessaloniki (women's volleyball)
- G.S. Iraklis Thessaloniki (rugby)
