= Iraklis B.C. in international competitions =

Men's basketball team in international competitions

Iraklis B.C. in international competitions is the history and statistics of Iraklis B.C. in European basketball club competitions.

== 1970s ==
=== 1976–77 FIBA Korać Cup, 3rd–tier ===
The 1976–77 FIBA Korać Cup was the 6th installment of the European 3rd-tier level professional basketball club competition FIBA Korać Cup, running from October 19, 1976 to April 5, 1977. The trophy was won by Jugoplastika, who defeated Alco Bologna by a result of 87–84 at Palasport della Fiera in Genoa, Italy. Overall, Iraklis achieved in present competition a record of 1 win against 1 defeat, in only one round. More detailed:

==== First round ====
- Tie played on October 19, 1976 and on October 26, 1976.

Team 1	Agg.	Team 2	1st leg	2nd leg
Iraklis (Greece)	147–187	(Socialist Federal Republic of Yugoslavia) Bosna	83–91	64–96

== 1980s ==
=== 1981–82 FIBA Korać Cup, 3rd–tier ===
The 1981–82 FIBA Korać Cup was the 11th installment of the European 3rd-tier level professional basketball club competition FIBA Korać Cup, running from October 7, 1981 to March 18, 1982. The trophy was won by Limoges CSP, who defeated Šibenka by a result of 90–84 at Palasport San Lazzaro in Padua, Italy. Overall, Iraklis achieved in present competition a record of 1 win against 1 defeat, in only one round. More detailed:

==== First round ====
- Tie played on October 7, 1981 and on October 14, 1981.

Team 1	Agg.	Team 2	1st leg	2nd leg
Latte Sole Bologna (Italy)	173–158	(Greece) Iraklis	86–56	87–102

=== 1982–83 FIBA Korać Cup, 3rd–tier ===
The 1982–83 FIBA Korać Cup was the 12th installment of the European 3rd-tier level professional basketball club competition FIBA Korać Cup, running from October 6, 1982 to March 8, 1983. The trophy was won by the title holder Limoges CSP, who defeated -for second consecutive time- Šibenka by a result of 94–86 at Deutschlandhalle in West Berlin, West Germany. Overall, Iraklis achieved in present competition a record of 0 wins against 2 defeats, in only one round. More detailed:

==== First round ====
- Tie played on October 6, 1982 and on October 13, 1982.

Team 1	Agg.	Team 2	1st leg	2nd leg
Iraklis (Greece)	162–192	(Italy) Carrera Venezia	85–90	77–102

=== 1983–84 FIBA Korać Cup, 3rd–tier ===
The 1983–84 FIBA Korać Cup was the 13th installment of the European 3rd-tier level professional basketball club competition FIBA Korać Cup, running from September 28, 1983 to March 15, 1984. The trophy was won by Orthez, who defeated Crvena zvezda by a result of 97–73 at Palais des sports Pierre-de-Coubertin in Paris, France. Overall, Iraklis achieved in present competition a record of 1 win against 1 defeat, in only one round. More detailed:

==== First round ====
- Tie played on September 28, 1983 and on October 5, 1983.

Team 1	Agg.	Team 2	1st leg	2nd leg
Giants Osnabrück (West Germany)	177–158	(Greece) Iraklis	90–63	87–95

=== 1985–86 FIBA Korać Cup, 3rd–tier ===
The 1985–86 FIBA Korać Cup was the 15th installment of the European 3rd-tier level professional basketball club competition FIBA Korać Cup, running from October 2, 1985 to March 27, 1986. The trophy was won by Banco di Roma, who defeated Mobilgirgi Caserta by a result of 157–150 in a two-legged final on a home and away basis. Overall, Iraklis achieved in present competition a record of 1 win against 1 defeat, in only one round. More detailed:

==== First round ====
- Tie played on October 2, 1985 and on October 9, 1985.

Team 1	Agg.	Team 2	1st leg	2nd leg
Iraklis (Greece)	168–176	(Bulgaria) Spartak Pleven	92–78	76–98

=== 1987–88 FIBA Korać Cup, 3rd–tier ===
The 1987–88 FIBA Korać Cup was the 17th installment of the European 3rd-tier level professional basketball club competition FIBA Korać Cup, running from September 23, 1987 to March 9, 1988. The trophy was won by Real Madrid, who defeated Cibona by a result of 195–183 in a two-legged final on a home and away basis. Overall, Iraklis achieved in present competition a record of 2 wins against 2 defeats, in two successive rounds. More detailed:

==== First round ====
- Tie played on September 23, 1987 and on September 30, 1987.

Team 1	Agg.	Team 2	1st leg	2nd leg
Iraklis (Greece)	181–148	(Bulgaria) Spartak Pleven	101–65	80–83

==== Second round ====
- Tie played on October 14, 1987 and on October 21, 1987.

Team 1	Agg.	Team 2	1st leg	2nd leg
Iraklis (Greece)	167–199	(Spain) Estudiantes Todagrés	100–98	67–101

== 1990s ==
=== 1989–90 FIBA Korać Cup, 3rd–tier ===
The 1989–90 FIBA Korać Cup was the 19th installment of the European 3rd-tier level professional basketball club competition FIBA Korać Cup, running from September 27, 1989 to March 28, 1990. The trophy was won by Ram Joventut, who defeated Scavolini Pesaro by a result of 195–184 in a two-legged final on a home and away basis. Overall, Iraklis achieved in present competition a record of 3 wins against 7 defeats, in three successive rounds. More detailed:

==== First round ====
- Tie played on September 27, 1989 and on October 4, 1989.

Team 1	Agg.	Team 2	1st leg	2nd leg
Iraklis (Greece)	161–158	(Socialist Federal Republic of Yugoslavia) Crvena zvezda	99–81	62–77

==== Second round ====
- Tie played on October 25, 1989 and on November 1, 1989.

Team 1	Agg.	Team 2	1st leg	2nd leg
Paşabahçe (Turkey)	150–155	(Greece) Iraklis	80–82	70–73

==== Top 16 ====
- Day 1 (December 6, 1989)

Team 1	Score	Team 2
Bosna (Socialist Federal Republic of Yugoslavia)	105–97	(Greece) Iraklis

- Day 2 (December 13, 1989)

Team 1	Score	Team 2
CSKA Moscow (Soviet Union)	90–76	(Greece) Iraklis

- Day 3 (January 17, 1990)

Team 1	Score	Team 2
Iraklis (Greece)	74–82	(Italy) Phonola Caserta

- Day 4 (January 24, 1990)

Team 1	Score	Team 2
Iraklis (Greece)	87–105	(Socialist Federal Republic of Yugoslavia) Bosna

- Day 5 (January 31, 1990)

Team 1	Score	Team 2
Iraklis (Greece)	83–95	(Soviet Union) CSKA Moscow

- Day 6 (February 7, 1990)

Team 1	Score	Team 2
Phonola Caserta (Italy)	87–68	(Greece) Iraklis

- Group A standings:

Pos.	Team	Pld.	Pts.	W	L	PF	PA	PD	Tie-break
1.	(Soviet Union) CSKA Moscow	6	10	4	2	514	477	+37	2–2 (+11)
2.	(Socialist Federal Republic of Yugoslavia) Bosna	6	10	4	2	544	519	+25	2–2 (-1)
3.	(Italy) Phonola Caserta	6	10	4	2	492	475	+17	2–2 (-10)
4.	(Greece) Iraklis	6	6	0	6	485	564	-79	

=== 1990–91 FIBA Korać Cup, 3rd–tier ===
The 1990–91 FIBA Korać Cup was the 20th installment of the European 3rd-tier level professional basketball club competition FIBA Korać Cup, running from September 26, 1990 to March 27, 1991. The trophy was won by Shampoo Clear Cantù, who defeated Real Madrid Otaysa by a result of 168–164 in a two-legged final on a home and away basis. Overall, Iraklis achieved in present competition a record of 4 wins against 6 defeats, in three successive rounds. More detailed:

==== First round ====
- Tie played on September 26, 1990 and on October 3, 1990.

Team 1	Agg.	Team 2	1st leg	2nd leg
EnBW Ludwigsburg (West Germany)	154–186	(Greece) Iraklis	92–91	62–95

==== Second round ====
- Tie played on October 24, 1990 and on October 31, 1990.

Team 1	Agg.	Team 2	1st leg	2nd leg
VEF Rīga (Soviet Union)	189–200	(Greece) Iraklis	113–97	76–103

==== Top 16 ====
- Day 1 (December 12, 1990)

Team 1	Score	Team 2
Iraklis (Greece)	112–89	(France) FC Mulhouse

- Day 2 (December 19, 1990)

Team 1	Score	Team 2
Iraklis (Greece)	70–91	(Spain) Montigalà Joventut

- Day 3 (January 3, 1991)

Team 1	Score	Team 2
Antifurti Ranger Varese (Italy)	121–95	(Greece) Iraklis

- Day 4 (January 9, 1991)

Team 1	Score	Team 2
FC Mulhouse (France)	90–83	(Greece) Iraklis

- Day 5 (January 16, 1991)

Team 1	Score	Team 2
Montigalà Joventut (Spain)	84–52	(Greece) Iraklis

- Day 6 (January 23, 1991)

Team 1	Score	Team 2
Iraklis (Greece)	98–73	(Italy) Antifurti Ranger Varese

- Group C standings:

Pos.	Team	Pld.	Pts.	W	L	PF	PA	PD	Tie-break
1.	(Spain) Montigalà Joventut	6	11	5	1	532	387	+145	
2.	(France) FC Mulhouse	6	9	3	3	466	533	-67	
3.	(Italy) Antifurti Ranger Varese	6	8	2	4	523	563	-40	1–1 (+1)
4.	(Greece) Iraklis	6	8	2	4	510	548	-38	1–1 (-1)

=== 1991–92 FIBA Korać Cup, 3rd–tier ===
The 1991–92 FIBA Korać Cup was the 21st installment of the European 3rd-tier level professional basketball club competition FIBA Korać Cup, running from October 2, 1991 to March 18, 1992. The trophy was won by il Messaggero Roma, who defeated Scavolini Pesaro by a result of 193–180 in a two-legged final on a home and away basis. Overall, Iraklis achieved in present competition a record of 3 wins against 7 defeats, in three successive rounds. More detailed:

==== First round ====
- Tie played on October 1, 1991 and on October 9, 1991.

Team 1	Agg.	Team 2	1st leg	2nd leg
Baník Handlová (Czechoslovakia)	148–200	(Greece) Iraklis	79–89	69–111

==== Second round ====
- Tie played on October 30, 1991 and on November 6, 1991.

Team 1	Agg.	Team 2	1st leg	2nd leg
Collado Villalba (Spain)	181–182	(Greece) Iraklis	84–89	97–93

==== Top 16 ====
- Day 1 (November 27, 1991)

Team 1	Score	Team 2
Fórum Filatélico Valladolid (Spain)	94–76	(Greece) Iraklis

- Day 2 (December 4, 1991)

Team 1	Score	Team 2
Iraklis (Greece)	80–85	(Italy) Shampoo Clear Cantù

- Day 3 (December 11, 1991)

Team 1	Score	Team 2
Hapoel Tel Aviv (Israel)	106–79	(Greece) Iraklis

- Day 4 (December 18, 1991)

Team 1	Score	Team 2
Iraklis (Greece)	89–95	(Spain) Fórum Filatélico Valladolid

- Day 5 (January 8, 1992)

Team 1	Score	Team 2
Shampoo Clear Cantù (Italy)	96–73	(Greece) Iraklis

- Day 6 (January 15, 1992)

Team 1	Score	Team 2
Iraklis (Greece)	98–107	(Israel) Hapoel Tel Aviv

- Group C standings:

Pos.	Team	Pld.	Pts.	W	L	PF	PA	PD
1.	(Spain) Fórum Filatélico Valladolid	6	11	5	1	508	490	+18
2.	(Italy) Shampoo Clear Cantù	6	10	4	2	517	483	+34
3.	(Israel) Hapoel Tel Aviv	6	9	3	3	551	515	+36
4.	(Greece) Iraklis	6	6	0	6	495	583	-88

=== 1992–93 FIBA Korać Cup, 3rd–tier ===
The 1992–93 FIBA Korać Cup was the 22nd installment of the European 3rd-tier level professional basketball club competition FIBA Korać Cup, running from September 9, 1992 to March 18, 1993. The trophy was won by Philips Milano, who defeated Virtus Roma by a result of 201–181 in a two-legged final on a home and away basis. Overall, Replay Iraklis achieved in present competition a record of 7 wins against 3 defeats, in four successive rounds. More detailed:

==== First round ====
- Bye

==== Second round ====
- Tie played on September 29, 1992 and on October 7, 1992.

Team 1	Agg.	Team 2	1st leg	2nd leg
Keravnos (Cyprus)	165–212	(Greece) Replay Iraklis	85-96	80–116

==== Third round ====
- Tie played on October 26, 1992 and on November 4, 1992.

Team 1	Agg.	Team 2	1st leg	2nd leg
VEF Adazhi Interlatvia Rīga (Latvia)	147–191	(Greece) Replay Iraklis	83-109	64–82

==== Top 16 ====
- Day 1 (November 25, 1992)

Team 1	Score	Team 2
Phonola Caserta (Italy)	101–87	(Greece) Replay Iraklis

- Day 2 (December 2, 1992)

Team 1	Score	Team 2
Replay Iraklis (Greece)	79–76	(Belgium) Sunair Oostende

- Day 3 (December 9, 1992)

Team 1	Score	Team 2
FC Barcelona Banca Catalana (Spain)	101–74	(Greece) Replay Iraklis

- Day 4 (December 16, 1992)

Team 1	Score	Team 2
Replay Iraklis (Greece)	93–88	(Italy) Phonola Caserta

- Day 5 (January 6, 1993)

Team 1	Score	Team 2
Sunair Oostende (Belgium)	77–82	(Greece) Replay Iraklis

- Day 6 (January 13, 1993)

Team 1	Score	Team 2
Replay Iraklis (Greece)	70–84	(Spain) FC Barcelona Banca Catalana

- Group B standings:

Pos.	Team	Pld.	Pts.	W	L	PF	PA	PD	Tie-break
1.	(Spain) FC Barcelona Banca Catalana	6	11	5	1	529	462	+67	
2.	(Italy) Phonola Caserta	6	9	3	3	519	511	+8	1–1 (+9)
3.	(Greece) Replay Iraklis	6	9	3	3	485	527	-42	1–1 (-9)
4.	(Belgium) Sunair Oostende	6	7	1	5	470	503	-33	

=== 1994–95 FIBA European Cup, 2nd–tier ===
The 1994–95 FIBA European Cup was the 29th installment of FIBA's 2nd-tier level European-wide professional club basketball competition FIBA European Cup (lately called FIBA Saporta Cup), running from September 6, 1994 to March 14, 1995. The trophy was won by Benetton Treviso, who defeated Taugrés by a result of 94–86 at Abdi İpekçi Arena in Istanbul, Turkey. Overall, Iraklis Aspis Pronoia achieved in the present competition a record of 14 wins against 3 defeats, in five successive rounds. More detailed:

==== First round ====
- Bye

==== Second round ====
- Tie played on September 27, 1994 and on October 4, 1994.

Team 1	Agg.	Team 2	1st leg	2nd leg
Marc Körmend (Hungary)	117–148	(Greece) Iraklis Aspis Pronoia	51–60	66–88

==== Third round ====
- Tie played on October 25, 1994 and on November 1, 1994.

Team 1	Agg.	Team 2	1st leg	2nd leg
Kovinotehna Savinjska Polzela (Slovenia)	130–163	(Greece) Iraklis Aspis Pronoia	66–69	64–94

==== Top 12 ====
- Day 1 (November 22, 1994)

Team 1	Score	Team 2
Iraklis Aspis Pronoia (Greece)	89–87	(Belgium) Maes Flandria

- Day 2 (November 29, 1994)

Team 1	Score	Team 2
Kyiv (Ukraine)	77–81	(Greece) Iraklis Aspis Pronoia

- Day 3 (December 6, 1994)

Team 1	Score	Team 2
Iraklis Aspis Pronoia (Greece)	75–70	Croatia Osiguranje

- Day 4 (December 13, 1994)

Team 1	Score	Team 2
Fidefinanz Bellinzona (Switzerland)	54–66	(Greece) Iraklis Aspis Pronoia

- Day 5 (January 3, 1995)

Team 1	Score	Team 2
Iraklis Aspis Pronoia (Greece)	74–71	(France) Olympique Antibes

- Day 6 (January 10, 1995)

Team 1	Score	Team 2
Maes Flandria (Belgium)	69–92	(Greece) Iraklis Aspis Pronoia

- Day 7 (January 17, 1995)

Team 1	Score	Team 2
Iraklis Aspis Pronoia (Greece)	98–66	(Ukraine) Kyiv

- Day 8 (January 24, 1995)

Team 1	Score	Team 2
Croatia Osiguranje	63–71	(Greece) Iraklis Aspis Pronoia

- Day 9 (January 31, 1995)

Team 1	Score	Team 2
Iraklis Aspis Pronoia (Greece)	85–70	(Switzerland) Fidefinanz Bellinzona

- Day 10 (February 7, 1995)

Team 1	Score	Team 2
Olympique Antibes (France)	88–78	(Greece) Iraklis Aspis Pronoia

- Group A standings:

Pos.	Team	Pld.	Pts.	W	L	PF	PA	PD	Tie-break
1.	(France) Olympique Antibes	10	19	9	1	857	752	+105	1–1 (+7)
2.	(Greece) Iraklis Aspis Pronoia	10	19	9	1	809	715	+93	1–1 (-7)
3.	Croatia Osiguranje	10	15	5	5	766	731	+35	
4.	(Belgium) Maes Flandria	10	14	4	6	805	807	-2	
5.	(Ukraine) Kyiv	10	12	2	8	817	934	-117	
6.	(Switzerland) Fidefinanz Bellinzona	10	11	1	9	669	784	-125	

==== Semifinals ====
- Best-of-3 playoff: Game 1 at home on February 14, 1995 / Game 2 away on February 21, 1995 / Game 3 away on February 23, 1995.

Team 1	Agg.	Team 2	1st leg	2nd leg	3rd leg
Iraklis Aspis Pronoia (Greece)	1–2	(Spain) Taugrés	79–78	74–79	66–70

=== 1995–96 FIBA European League, 1st–tier ===
The 1995–96 FIBA European League was the 39th installment of the European top-tier level professional club competition for basketball clubs (now called EuroLeague), running from September 7, 1995 to April 11, 1996. The trophy was won by Panathinaikos, who defeated FC Barcelona Banca Catalana by a result of 67–66 at Palais Omnisports de Paris-Bercy in Paris, France. Overall, Iraklis Aspis Pronoia achieved in present competition a record of 5 wins against 11 defeats, in three successive rounds. More detailed:

==== First round ====
- Bye

==== Second round ====
- Tie played on September 28, 1995 and on October 5, 1995.

Team 1	Agg.	Team 2	1st leg	2nd leg
Hapoel Galil Elyon (Israel)	137–176	(Greece) Iraklis Aspis Pronoia	83–91	54–76

==== Top 16 ====
- Day 1 (October 26, 1995)

Team 1	Score	Team 2
Ülker (Turkey)	74–72	(Greece) Iraklis Aspis Pronoia

- Day 2 (November 1, 1995)

Team 1	Score	Team 2
Iraklis Aspis Pronoia (Greece)	92–72	(France) Olympique Antibes

- Day 3 (November 23, 1995)

Team 1	Score	Team 2
Bayer 04 Leverkusen (Germany)	73–52	(Greece) Iraklis Aspis Pronoia

- Day 4 (November 29, 1995)

Team 1	Score	Team 2
CSKA Moscow (Russia)	82–66	(Greece) Iraklis Aspis Pronoia

- Day 5 (December 6, 1995)

Team 1	Score	Team 2
Iraklis Aspis Pronoia (Greece)	71–69	(Spain) Unicaja

- Day 6 (December 13, 1995)

Team 1	Score	Team 2
Olympiacos (Greece)	76–62	(Greece) Iraklis Aspis Pronoia

- Day 7 (December 20, 1995)

Team 1	Score	Team 2
Iraklis Aspis Pronoia (Greece)	75–79	(Italy) Benetton Treviso

- Day 8 (January 3, 1996)

Team 1	Score	Team 2
Iraklis Aspis Pronoia (Greece)	65–74	(Turkey) Ülker

- Day 9 (January 11, 1996)

Team 1	Score	Team 2
Olympique Antibes (France)	86–65	(Greece) Iraklis Aspis Pronoia

- Day 10 (January 17, 1996)

Team 1	Score	Team 2
Iraklis Aspis Pronoia (Greece)	72–81	(Germany) Bayer 04 Leverkusen

- Day 11 (January 24, 1996)

Team 1	Score	Team 2
Iraklis Aspis Pronoia (Greece)	71–68	(Russia) CSKA Moscow

- Day 12 (January 31, 1996)

Team 1	Score	Team 2
Unicaja (Spain)	89–52	(Greece) Iraklis Aspis Pronoia

- Day 13 (February 7, 1996)

Team 1	Score	Team 2
Iraklis Aspis Pronoia (Greece)	63–69	(Greece) Olympiacos

- Day 14 (February 15, 1996)

Team 1	Score	Team 2
Benetton Treviso (Italy)	73–68	(Greece) Iraklis Aspis Pronoia

- Group A standings:

Pos.	Team	Pld.	Pts.	W	L	PF	PA	PD	Tie-break
1.	(Russia) CSKA Moscow	14	24	10	4	1162	1081	+81	3–1
2.	(Italy) Benetton Treviso	14	24	10	4	1157	1096	+61	2–2
3.	(Greece) Olympiacos	14	24	10	4	1132	1046	+86	1–3
4.	(Turkey) Ülker	14	20	6	8	1078	1104	+26	2–2 (+15)
5.	(Spain) Unicaja	14	20	6	8	1104	1081	+23	2–2 (+13)
6.	(France) Olympique Antibes	14	20	6	8	1108	1169	-61	2–2 (-28)
7.	(Germany) Bayer 04 Leverkusen	14	19	5	9	1067	1112	-45	
8.	(Greece) Iraklis Aspis Pronoia	14	17	3	11	945	1064	-119	

=== 1996–97 FIBA EuroCup, 2nd–tier ===
The 1996–97 FIBA EuroCup was the 31st installment of FIBA's 2nd-tier level European-wide professional club basketball competition FIBA EuroCup (lately called FIBA Saporta Cup), running from September 17, 1996 to April 15, 1997. The trophy was won by Real Madrid Teka, who defeated Mash Jeans Verona by a result of 78–64 at Eleftheria Indoor Hall in Nicosia, Cyprus. Overall, Iraklis achieved in the present competition a record of 13 wins against 5 defeats, in five successive rounds. More detailed:

==== First round ====
- Day 1 (September 17, 1996)

Team 1	Score	Team 2
Iraklis (Greece)	100–76	(Cyprus) Achilleas Kaimakli

- Day 2 (September 24, 1996)

Team 1	Score	Team 2
AST Gent (Belgium)	77–87	(Greece) Iraklis

- Day 3 (October 1, 1996)

Team 1	Score	Team 2
Iraklis (Greece)	104–84	(Netherlands) Libertel EBBC

- Day 4 (October 8, 1996)

Team 1	Score	Team 2
Śląsk Wrocław (Poland)	86–84	(Greece) Iraklis

- Day 5 (October 15, 1996)

Team 1	Score	Team 2
Iraklis (Greece)	88–73	(Croatia) Zadar

- Day 6 (November 5, 1996)

Team 1	Score	Team 2
Achilleas Kaimakli (Cyprus)	74–98	(Greece) Iraklis

- Day 7 (November 12, 1996)

Team 1	Score	Team 2
Iraklis (Greece)	86–60	(Belgium) AST Gent

- Day 8 (November 19, 1996)

Team 1	Score	Team 2
Libertel EBBC (Netherlands)	78–94	(Greece) Iraklis

- Day 9 (December 3, 1996)

Team 1	Score	Team 2
Iraklis (Greece)	86–74	(Poland) Śląsk Wrocław

- Day 10 (December 10, 1996)

Team 1	Score	Team 2
Zadar (Croatia)	93–87	(Greece) Iraklis

- Group E standings:

Pos.	Team	Pld.	Pts.	W	L	PF	PA	PD	Tie-break
1.	(Greece) Iraklis	10	18	8	2	914	775	+139	
2.	(Poland) Śląsk Wrocław	10	17	7	3	853	811	+42	
3.	(Belgium) AST Gent	10	16	6	4	803	770	+33	1–1 (+4)
4.	(Croatia) Zadar	10	16	6	4	817	810	+7	1–1 (-4)
5.	(Netherlands) Libertel EBBC	10	13	3	7	847	895	-48	
6.	(Cyprus) Achilleas Kaimakli	10	10	0	10	760	933	-193	

==== Second round ====
- Tie played on January 14, 1997 and on January 21, 1997.

Team 1	Agg.	Team 2	1st leg	2nd leg
Stavex Brno (Czech Republic)	147–154	(Greece) Iraklis	86–78	61–76

==== Top 16 ====
- Tie played on February 11, 1997 and on February 18, 1997.

Team 1	Agg.	Team 2	1st leg	2nd leg
TDK Manresa (Spain)	132–140	(Greece) Iraklis	74–79	58–61

==== Quarterfinals ====
- Tie played on March 4, 1997 and on March 11, 1997.

Team 1	Agg.	Team 2	1st leg	2nd leg
Hapoel Jerusalem (Israel)	126–133	(Greece) Iraklis	68–63	58–70

==== Semifinals ====
- Tie played on March 25, 1997 and on April 1, 1997.

Team 1	Agg.	Team 2	1st leg	2nd leg
Mash Jeans Verona (Italy)	152–138	(Greece) Iraklis	96–62	56–76

== 2000s ==
=== 1999–2000 FIBA Saporta Cup, 2nd–tier ===
The 1999–2000 FIBA Saporta Cup was the 34th installment of FIBA's 2nd-tier level European-wide professional club basketball competition FIBA Saporta Cup, running from September 21, 1999 to April 11, 2000. The trophy was won by AEK, who defeated Kinder Bologna by a result of 83–76 at Centre Intercommunal de Glace de Malley in Lausanne, Switzerland. Overall, Hercules (Note: Iraklis B.C. adopted the Latin name Hercules exclusively for this current season at FIBA Saporta Cup.) achieved in the present competition a record of 14 wins against 2 defeats, in four successive rounds. More detailed:

==== First round ====
- Day 1 (September 21, 1999)

Team 1	Score	Team 2
Slovakofarma Pezinok (Slovakia)	52–64	(Greece) Hercules

- Day 2 (September 28, 1999)

Team 1	Score	Team 2
Hercules (Greece)	70–63	(Germany) Telekom Baskets Bonn

- Day 3 (October 5, 1999)

Team 1	Score	Team 2
FC Porto (Portugal)	74–60	(Greece) Hercules

- Day 4 (October 12, 1999)

Team 1	Score	Team 2
Hercules (Greece)	86–53	(Austria) UKJ SÜBA St. Pölten

- Day 5 (October 19, 1999)

Team 1	Score	Team 2
Hercules (Greece)	79–71	(Federal Republic of Yugoslavia) Partizan

- Day 6 (November 2, 1999)

Team 1	Score	Team 2
Hercules (Greece)	105–97	(Slovakia) Slovakofarma Pezinok

- Day 7 (November 9, 1999)

Team 1	Score	Team 2
Telekom Baskets Bonn (Germany)	59–64	(Greece) Hercules

- Day 8 (November 16, 1999)

Team 1	Score	Team 2
Hercules (Greece)	65–58	(Portugal) FC Porto

- Day 9 (December 7, 1999)

Team 1	Score	Team 2
UKJ SÜBA St. Pölten (Austria)	75–90	(Greece) Hercules

- Day 10 (December 14, 1999)

Team 1	Score	Team 2
Partizan (Federal Republic of Yugoslavia)	54–60	(Greece) Hercules

- Group E standings:

Pos.	Team	Pld.	Pts.	W	L	PF	PA	PD	Tie-break
1.	(Greece) Hercules	10	19	9	1	743	656	+87	
2.	(Portugal) FC Porto	10	16	6	4	726	686	+40	
3.	(Slovakia) Slovakofarma Pezinok	10	15	5	5	786	782	+4	2–2 (+3)
4.	(Germany) Telekom Baskets Bonn	10	15	5	5	731	718	+13	2–2 (-1)
5.	(Federal Republic of Yugoslavia) Partizan	10	15	5	5	634	719	-85	2–2 (-2)
6.	(Austria) UKJ SÜBA St. Pölten	10	10	0	10	639	798	-159	

==== Second round ====
- Tie played on January 11, 2000 and on January 18, 2000.

Team 1	Agg.	Team 2	1st leg	2nd leg
Norrköping Dolphins (Sweden)	144–206	(Greece) Hercules	64–87	80–119

==== Top 16 ====
- Tie played on February 8, 2000 and on February 15, 2000.

Team 1	Agg.	Team 2	1st leg	2nd leg
Split CO (Croatia)	129–150	(Greece) Hercules	63–71	66–79

==== Quarterfinals ====
- Tie played on March 1, 2000 and on March 7, 2000.

Team 1	Agg.	Team 2	1st leg	2nd leg
AEK (Greece)	154–146	(Greece) Hercules	84–73	70–73

=== 2000–01 FIBA SuproLeague, 1st–tier ===
The 2000–01 FIBA SuproLeague was the FIBA European professional club basketball Champions' Cup for the 2000–01 season, running from October 19, 2000 to May 13, 2001. Up until that season, there was one cup, the FIBA European Champions' Cup (which is now called the EuroLeague), though in this season of 2000–01, the leading European teams split into two competitions: the FIBA SuproLeague and Euroleague Basketball Company's Euroleague 2000–01. The trophy was won by Maccabi Tel Aviv, who defeated Panathinaikos by a result of 81–67 at Palais Omnisports de Paris-Bercy in Paris, France. Overall, Iraklis achieved in the present competition a record of 11 wins against 10 defeats, in two successive rounds. More detailed:

==== Regular season ====
- Day 1 (October 18, 2000)

Team 1	Score	Team 2
Iraklis (Greece)	73–80	(Slovenia) Krka

- Day 2 (October 25, 2000)

Team 1	Score	Team 2
Iraklis (Greece)	91–76	(Federal Republic of Yugoslavia) Partizan

- Day 3 (November 1, 2000)

Team 1	Score	Team 2
Scavolini Pesaro (Italy)	90–70	(Greece) Iraklis

- Day 4 (November 8, 2000)

Team 1	Score	Team 2
Iraklis (Greece)	89–74	(Sweden) Plannja Basket

- Day 5 (November 15, 2000)

Team 1	Score	Team 2
Telindus Oostende (Belgium)	83–77	(Greece) Iraklis

- Day 6 (December 6, 2000)

Team 1	Score	Team 2
Iraklis (Greece)	72–87	(Turkey) Efes Pilsen

- Day 7 (December 13, 2000)

Team 1	Score	Team 2
Bayer 04 Leverkusen (Germany)	106–110*	(Greece) Iraklis

^{*}Overtime at the end of regulation (89–89).

- Day 8 (December 21, 2000)

Team 1	Score	Team 2
Iraklis (Greece)	92–85	(Israel) Maccabi Tel Aviv

- Day 9 (January 3, 2001)

Team 1	Score	Team 2
Pau-Orthez (France)	76–74	(Greece) Iraklis

- Day 10 (January 10, 2001)

Team 1	Score	Team 2
Krka (Slovenia)	65–85	(Greece) Iraklis

- Day 11 (January 18, 2001)

Team 1	Score	Team 2
Partizan (Federal Republic of Yugoslavia)	93–81	(Greece) Iraklis

- Day 12 (January 31, 2001)

Team 1	Score	Team 2
Iraklis (Greece)	92–85	(Italy) Scavolini Pesaro

- Day 13 (February 7, 2001)

Team 1	Score	Team 2
Plannja Basket (Sweden)	90–94	(Greece) Iraklis

- Day 14 (February 14, 2001)

Team 1	Score	Team 2
Iraklis (Greece)	74–62	(Belgium) Telindus Oostende

- Day 15 (February 21, 2001)

Team 1	Score	Team 2
Efes Pilsen (Turkey)	88–65	(Greece) Iraklis

- Day 16 (February 28, 2001)

Team 1	Score	Team 2
Iraklis (Greece)	98–87	(Germany) Bayer 04 Leverkusen

- Day 17 (March 8, 2001)

Team 1	Score	Team 2
Maccabi Tel Aviv (Israel)	95–71	(Greece) Iraklis

- Day 18 (March 14, 2001)

Team 1	Score	Team 2
Iraklis (Greece)	86–82	(France) Pau-Orthez

- Group B standings:

Pos.	Team	Pld.	Pts.	W	L	PF	PA	PD	Tie-break
1.	(Israel) Maccabi Tel Aviv	18	33	15	3	1616	1343	+273	
2.	(Turkey) Efes Pilsen	18	31	13	5	1478	1386	+92	
3.	(Federal Republic of Yugoslavia) Partizan	18	29	11	7	1492	1517	-25	
4.	(Greece) Iraklis	18	28	10	8	1494	1504	-10	
5.	(Italy) Scavolini Pesaro	18	27	9	9	1594	1518	+76	1–1 (+5)
6.	(France) Pau-Orthez	18	27	9	9	1486	1432	+54	1–1 (-5)
7.	(Belgium) Telindus Oostende	18	26	8	10	1478	1544	-66	
8.	(Slovenia) Krka	18	25	7	11	1401	1487	-86	
9.	(Germany) Bayer 04 Leverkusen	18	24	6	12	1559	1624	-65	
10.	(Sweden) Plannja Basket	18	20	2	16	1394	1637	-243	

==== Top 16 ====
- Best-of-3 playoff: Game 1 at home on March 27, 2001 / Game 2 away on March 29, 2001 / Game 3 at home on April 5, 2001.

Team 1	Agg.	Team 2	1st leg	2nd leg	3rd leg
Iraklis (Greece)	1–2	(Germany) Alba Berlin	78–67	77–88	75–86

=== 2001–02 FIBA Saporta Cup, 2nd–tier ===
The 2001–02 FIBA Saporta Cup was the 36th installment of FIBA's 2nd-tier level European-wide professional club basketball competition FIBA Saporta Cup, running from October 30, 2001 to April 30, 2002. The trophy was won by Montepaschi Siena, who defeated Pamesa Valencia by a result of 81–71 at Palais des Sports de Gerland in Lyon, France. Overall, Iraklis achieved in the present competition a record of 8 wins against 4 defeats, in two successive rounds. More detailed:

==== Regular season ====
- Day 1 (October 30, 2001)

Team 1	Score	Team 2
Keravnos Keo (Cyprus)	72–80	(Greece) Iraklis

- Day 2 (November 6, 2001)

Team 1	Score	Team 2
Iraklis (Greece)	88–78	(Croatia) Split CO

- Day 3 (November 13, 2001)

Team 1	Score	Team 2
Igokea (Bosnia and Herzegovina)	81–90	(Greece) Iraklis

- Day 4 (December 4, 2001)

Team 1	Score	Team 2
Iraklis (Greece)	71–76	(Federal Republic of Yugoslavia) FMP Železnik

- Day 5 (December 11, 2001)

Team 1	Score	Team 2
Iraklis (Greece)	62–66	(Slovakia) Slovakofarma Pezinok

- Day 6 (December 18, 2001)

Team 1	Score	Team 2
Iraklis (Greece)	80–48	(Cyprus) Keravnos Keo

- Day 7 (January 8, 2002)

Team 1	Score	Team 2
Split CO (Croatia)	87–92*	(Greece) Iraklis

^{*}Overtime at the end of regulation (79–79).

- Day 8 (January 15, 2002)

Team 1	Score	Team 2
Iraklis (Greece)	85–50	(Bosnia and Herzegovina) Igokea

- Day 9 (January 29, 2002)

Team 1	Score	Team 2
FMP Železnik (Federal Republic of Yugoslavia)	63–92	(Greece) Iraklis

- Day 10 (February 5, 2002)

Team 1	Score	Team 2
Slovakofarma Pezinok (Slovakia)	86–74	(Greece) Iraklis

- Group D standings:

Pos.	Team	Pld.	Pts.	W	L	PF	PA	PD	Tie-break
1.	(Slovakia) Slovakofarma Pezinok	10	18	8	2	827	736	+91	
2.	(Greece) Iraklis	10	17	7	3	815	707	+108	1–1 (+24)
3.	(Federal Republic of Yugoslavia) FMP Železnik	10	17	7	3	818	770	+48	1–1 (-24)
4.	(Croatia) Split CO	10	15	5	5	863	873	-10	
5.	(Bosnia and Herzegovina) Igokea	10	13	3	7	768	827	-59	
6.	(Cyprus) Keravnos Keo	10	10	0	10	696	874	-178	

==== Top 16 ====
- Tie played on February 26, 2002 and on March 5, 2002.

Team 1	Agg.	Team 2	1st leg	2nd leg
UNICS (Russia)	167–163	(Greece) Iraklis	91–79	76–84*

^{*}The score in the second leg at the end of regulation was 76–64 for Iraklis, so it was necessary to play an extra-time to decide the winner of this match.

=== 2004–05 FIBA Europe League, 3rd–tier ===
The 2004–05 FIBA Europe League was the 2nd installment of FIBA's 3rd-tier level European-wide professional club basketball competition FIBA Europe League (later called FIBA EuroChallenge), running from October 26, 2004 to April 28, 2005. The trophy was won by Dynamo Saint Petersburg, who defeated Kyiv by a result of 85–74 at Abdi İpekçi Arena in Istanbul, Turkey. Overall, Iraklis achieved in the present competition a record of 3 wins against 11 defeats, in only one round. More detailed:

==== Regular season ====
- Day 1 (October 26, 2004)

Team 1	Score	Team 2
Iraklis (Greece)	62–63	(France) Racing Paris

- Day 2 (November 2, 2004)

Team 1	Score	Team 2
Iraklis (Greece)	73–65	(Greece) Olympia Larissa

- Day 3 (November 10, 2004)

Team 1	Score	Team 2
Hapoel Tel Aviv (Israel)	88–73	(Greece) Iraklis

- Day 4 (November 16, 2004)

Team 1	Score	Team 2
Iraklis (Greece)	89–79	(Serbia and Montenegro) Lavovi 063

- Day 5 (November 23, 2004)

Team 1	Score	Team 2
Khimik (Ukraine)	58–55	(Greece) Iraklis

- Day 6 (November 30, 2004)

Team 1	Score	Team 2
EKA AEL (Cyprus)	88–77	(Greece) Iraklis

- Day 7 (December 7, 2004)

Team 1	Score	Team 2
Dynamo Saint Petersburg (Russia)	87–75	(Greece) Iraklis

- Day 8 (December 14, 2004)

Team 1	Score	Team 2
Racing Paris (France)	71–51	(Greece) Iraklis

- Day 9 (December 21, 2004)

Team 1	Score	Team 2
Olympia Larissa (Greece)	68–63	(Greece) Iraklis

- Day 10 (January 11, 2005)

Team 1	Score	Team 2
Iraklis (Greece)	77–89	(Israel) Hapoel Tel Aviv

- Day 11 (January 18, 2005)

Team 1	Score	Team 2
Lavovi 063 (Serbia and Montenegro)	00–20*	(Greece) Iraklis

^{*}Lavovi 063 withdrew after Competition Day 7 and all the remaining games were declared null and void.

- Day 12 (January 25, 2005)

Team 1	Score	Team 2
Iraklis (Greece)	73–86	(Ukraine) Khimik

- Day 13 (February 1, 2005)

Team 1	Score	Team 2
Iraklis (Greece)	87–89	(Cyprus) EKA AEL

- Day 14 (February 8, 2005)

Team 1	Score	Team 2
Iraklis (Greece)	82–100	(Russia) Dynamo Saint Petersburg

- Group D standings:

	Team	Pld	Pts.	W	L	PF	PA	PD	Tie-break
1.	(Russia) Dynamo Saint Petersburg	14	28	14	0	1200	981	+219	
2.	(Ukraine) Khimik	14	23	9	5	1038	984	+54	2–0
3.	(France) Racing Paris	14	23	9	5	951	859	+92	0–2
4.	(Israel) Hapoel Tel Aviv	14	22	8	6	1068	1036	+32	2–0
5.	(Cyprus) EKA AEL	14	22	8	6	993	998	-5	0–2
6.	(Greece) Iraklis	14	17	3	11	957	1031	-74	1–1 (+3)
7.	(Greece) Olympia Larissa	14	17	3	11	958	1072	-114	1–1 (-3)
8.	(Serbia and Montenegro) Lavovi 063	14	16	2	12	556	770	-214	

== Record ==
Iraklis has an overall record, from 1976–77 (first participation) to 2004–05 (last participation) of: 91 wins against 77 defeats, in 168 games played in all of the European-wide club competitions.

- (1st–tier) FIBA European League & FIBA SuproLeague: 16–21 in 37 games.
- (2nd–tier) FIBA European Cup, or FIBA EuroCup, or FIBA Saporta Cup: 49–14 in 63 games.
- (3rd–tier) FIBA Korać Cup: 23–31 in 54 games.
- (3rd–tier) FIBA Europe League: 3–11 in 14 games.

== See also ==
- G.S. Iraklis Thessaloniki (men's basketball)
- Ivanofeio Sports Arena
- G.S. Iraklis Thessaloniki
- Iraklis F.C. (Thessaloniki)
- List of Iraklis Thessaloniki F.C. players
- List of Iraklis F.C. seasons
- G.S. Iraklis Thessaloniki (women's basketball)
- G.S. Iraklis Thessaloniki (men's volleyball)
- G.S. Iraklis Thessaloniki (women's volleyball)
- G.S. Iraklis Thessaloniki (water polo)
- G.S. Iraklis Thessaloniki (rugby)
