= G.S. Iraklis Thessaloniki =

Multisports club in Greece

G.S. Iraklis Thessalonikis
- Full name: Γυμναστικός Σύλλογος Θεσσαλονίκης «Ηρακλής»; Gymnastikos Syllogos Thessalonikis "Iraklis"; (Thessaloniki Gymnastic Club "Heracles")
- Nicknames: Γηραιός (Elder); Ημίθεος (Demigod)
- Founded: 1 July 1899; 127 years ago (as Omilos Filomouson); 29 November 1908; 117 years ago (as Makedonikos Gymnastikos Syllogos)
- Based in: Thessaloniki, Greece
- Colours: Blue; White
- President: Ephraim Kyrizidis
- Website: iraklis.club

Gymnastikos Syllogos Thessalonikis "Iraklis" (Greek: Γυμναστικός Σύλλογος Θεσσαλονίκης «Ηρακλής», lit. 'Thessaloniki Gymnastic Club "Heracles"'), commonly referred to as Iraklis Thessaloniki, is a multisports club based in the city of Thessaloniki, Macedonia, Greece.

G.S. Iraklis Thessalonikis was founded on 29 November 1908 and is one of the oldest and most historic sporting clubs in Greece, hence the nickname "Gireos" (Greek: Γηραιός, lit. 'Elder'). In 1910, the name "Iraklís" (Greek: Ηρακλής, lit. 'Heracles', Greek pronunciation: [iɾa'klis]) was added to the club's name to honour the ancient Greek demigod Heracles (or Hercules as the Roman equivalent), hence the nickname "Imitheos" (Greek: Ημίθεος, lit. 'Demigod'). The club's colours are blue and white, inspired by the flag of Greece.

== History ==
G.S. Iraklis Thessalonikis traces its roots to 1 July 1899 when Omilos Filomouson (Greek: Όμιλος Φιλομούσων, lit. 'Muses Friends Group') was established. The club was established as a cultural union of the Greeks of Thessaloniki (then under Ottoman sovereignty), and its sports department was founded in 1902. In 1903 the club joined forces with Olympia, another Greek Gymnastic Club of Thessaloniki. Football was a new sport at the time, but rapidly increasing in popularity and thus the board of directors decided to line up a football team. The first football match by the Omilos Filomouson team was held on 23 April 1905 which won by 3–0 against Union Sportive, a team of the Western European diaspora of Thessaloniki.

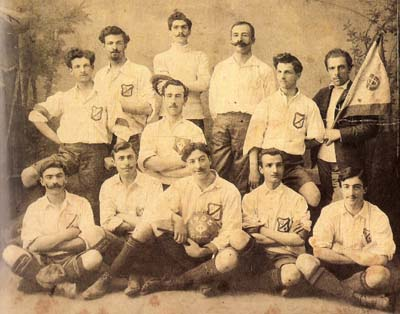
Omilos Filomouson squad on 23 April 1905.

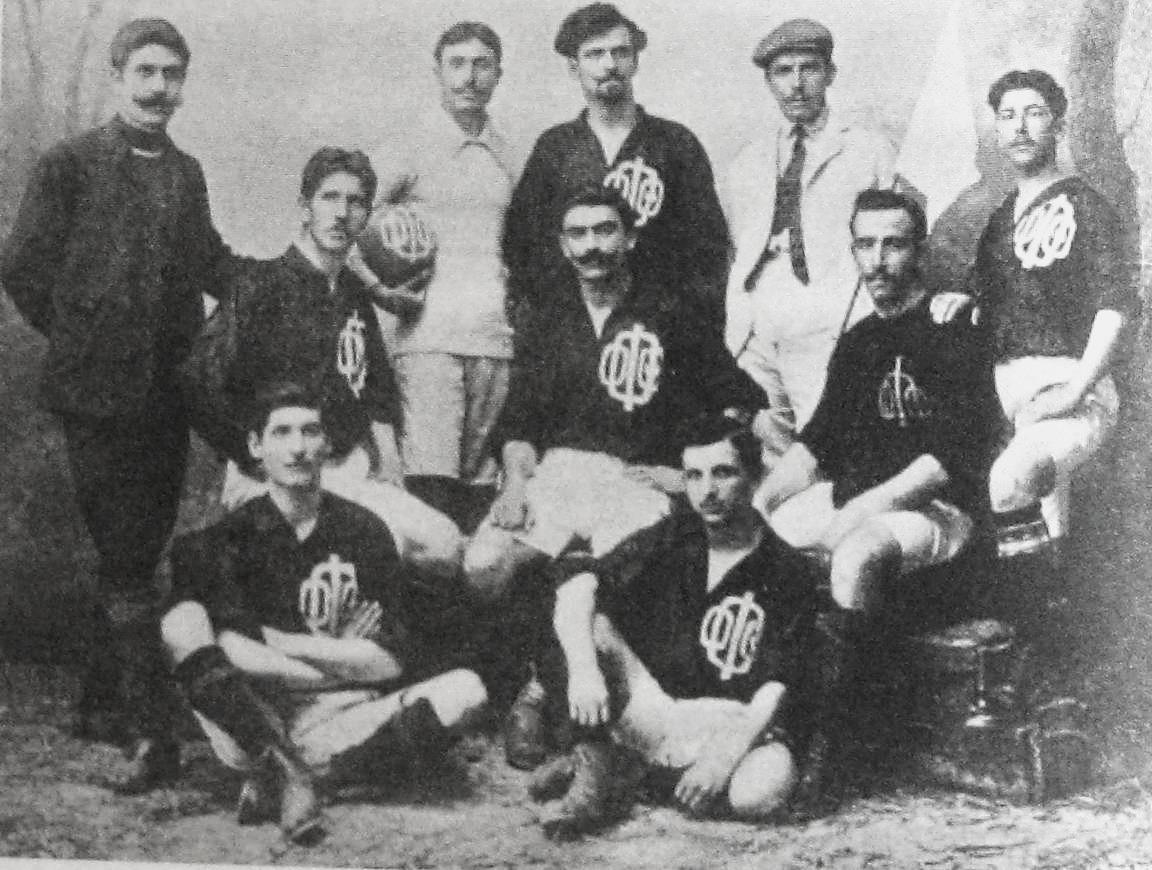
Omilos Filomouson squad at the 1906 Intercalated Games.

Later on, Omilos Filomouson faced financial problems. As a result, members of Omilos Filomouson founded on 29 November 1908 a new sporting club, called Makedonikos Gymnastikos Syllogos (Greek: Μακεδονικός Γυμναστικός Σύλλογος, lit. 'Macedonian Gymnastic Club'), that gained a permission to operate by the Ottoman authorities. The new club's first president was a Greek doctor, Alkiviadis Maltos. The name of the club had a direct reference to the ethnic tensions that took place in the area at that time.

Due to the Young Turks revolt of 1908 and their promises for ease of ethnic tensions in the area, the club was forced to change its name. Thus a new name was decided in 1910 for the club, Othomanikos Ellinikos Gymnastikos Syllogos Thessalonikis "Iraklis" (Greek: Οθωμανικός Ελληνικός Γυμναστικός Σύλλογος Θεσσαλονίκης «Ηρακλής», lit. 'Thessaloniki Ottoman Greek Gymnastic Club "Heracles"'). Τhe name "Iraklís" (Greek: Ηρακλής, lit. 'Heracles') was added to the club's name as an honour to the ancient Greek demigod. The new name was approved, together with a new statute and a new board of directors, by a general assembly of the club on 13 April 1911.

After the integration of Thessaloniki in the Kingdom of Greece on 26 October 1912, the operation of the club was accepted by the Greek courts in 1914 and became a fully registered sports club on 11 January 1915 as Gymnastikos Syllogos Thessalonikis "Iraklis" (Greek: Γυμναστικός Σύλλογος Θεσσαλονίκης «Ηρακλής», lit. 'Thessaloniki Gymnastic Club "Heracles"').

== Crest and colours ==
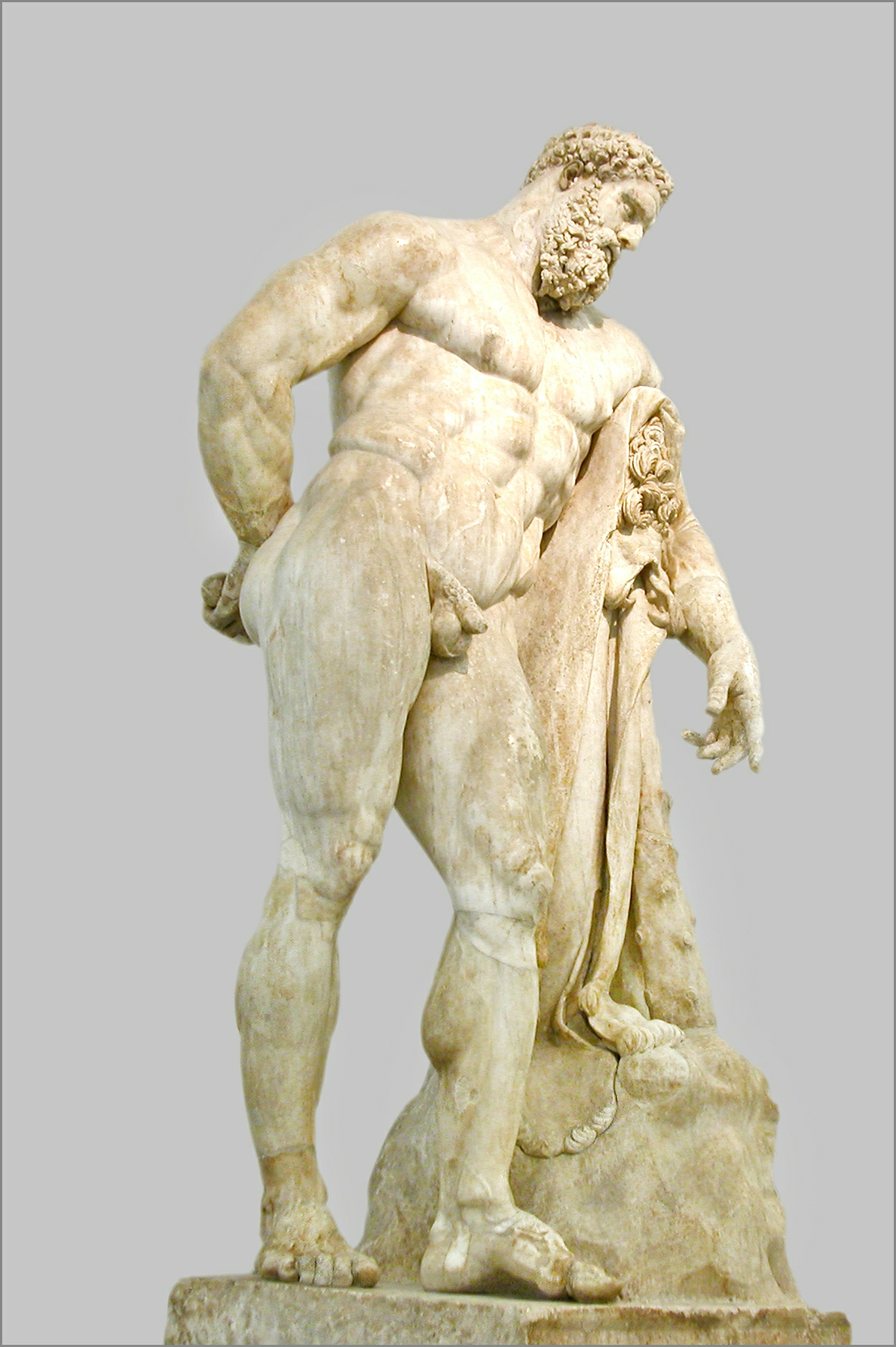
Farnese Hercules, emblem of the club

The crest of G.S. Iraklis Thessalonikis depicts the demigod Heracles in a moment of rest leaning on his gnarled club, a scene inspired by the statue of Farnese Hercules, itself a copy of a statue crafted by Lysippos in the 4th century BC. Throughout the entire club's history, its colours are blue or cyan and white to resemble the colours of the flag of Greece given the fact that G.S. Iraklis Thessalonikis was established while Thessaloniki was a part of the Ottoman Empire. The club is so known in Greece as "Kianolefkoi" (Greek: Κυανόλευκοι, lit. 'Cyan-Whites').

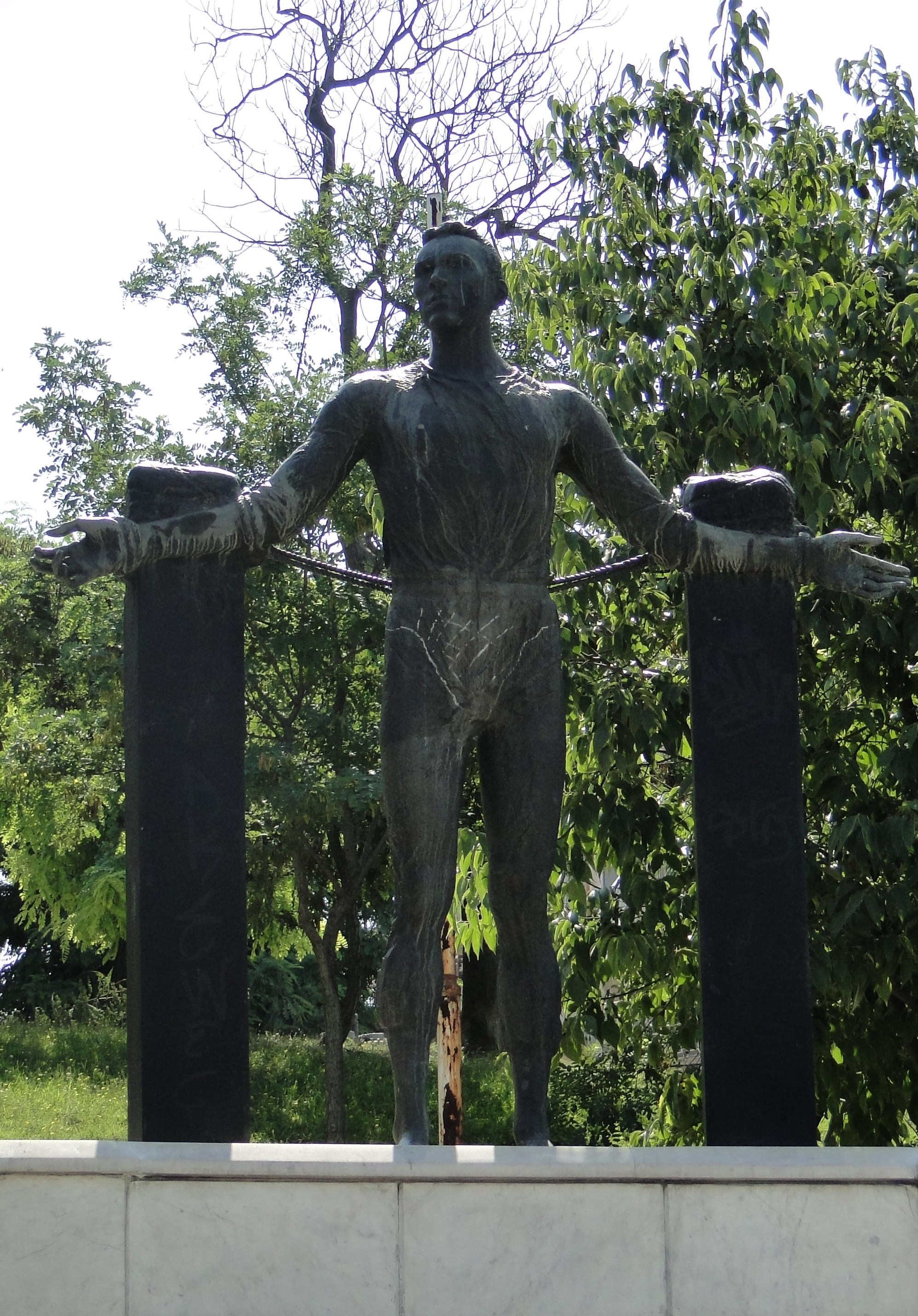
Statue of Jerzy Iwanow-Szajnowicz in Thessaloniki. Athlete of Iraklis and member of the Greek resistance during the WWII, was executed by the Nazis in 1943

== Sections ==
G.S. Iraklis Thessalonikis maintains sections in many sports including:

- G.S. Iraklis Thessalonikis (men's association football) (founded in 1908) – Association football
- G.S. Iraklis Thessalonikis (men's basketball) (founded in 1921) – Basketball
- G.S. Iraklis Thessalonikis (women's basketball) (founded in 1926) – Basketball
- G.S. Iraklis Thessalonikis (men's volleyball) (founded in 1921) – Volleyball
- G.S. Iraklis Thessalonikis (women's volleyball) (founded in 1926) – Volleyball
- G.S. Iraklis Thessalonikis (men's handball) (founded in 1994) – Handball
- G.S. Iraklis Thessalonikis (men's water polo) (founded in 1924) – Water polo
- G.S. Iraklis Thessalonikis (women's water polo) (founded in 1989) – Water polo
- G.S. Iraklis Thessalonikis (men's rugby) (founded in 2004) – Rugby football
- G.S. Iraklis Thessalonikis (women's rugby) (founded in 2013) – Rugby football
- G.S. Iraklis Thessalonikis (athletics) (founded in 1908) – Athletics
- G.S. Iraklis Thessalonikis (men's table tennis) (founded in 2013) – Table tennis
- G.S. Iraklis Thessalonikis (swimming) (founded in 1912) – Swimming
- G.S. Iraklis Thessalonikis (synchronized swimming) (founded in 1995) – Synchronized swimming
- G.S. Iraklis Thessalonikis (diving) (founded in 2019) – Diving
- G.S. Iraklis Thessalonikis (open water swimming) (founded in 1912) – Open water swimming
- G.S. Iraklis Thessalonikis (fencing) (founded in 1972) – Fencing
- G.S. Iraklis Thessalonikis (esports) (founded in 2023) – Esports

== Former Sections ==
- G.S. Iraklis Thessalonikis (men's inline hockey) (founded in 2008) – Inline hockey
- G.S. Iraklis Thessalonikis (men's ice hockey) (founded in 2008) – Ice hockey
- G.S. Iraklis Thessalonikis (men's cricket) (founded in 2015) – Cricket
- G.S. Iraklis Thessalonikis (cycling) (founded in 1931) – Cycling
- G.S. Iraklis Thessalonikis (wrestling) (founded in 1924) – Wrestling
- G.S. Iraklis Thessalonikis (boxing) (founded in 1965) – Boxing
- G.S. Iraklis Thessalonikis (judo) (founded in 1979) – Judo
- G.S. Iraklis Thessalonikis (ju jutsu) (founded in 2022) – Ju Jutsu
- G.S. Iraklis Thessalonikis (weightlifting) (founded in 1920) – Weightlifting
- G.S. Iraklis Thessalonikis (teqball) (founded in 2025) – Teqball

== Honours ==
=== Association football ===
- Greek Cup
  - Winners (1): 1976
- Balkans Cup
  - Winners (1): 1985

=== Basketball ===
==== Men ====
- Greek Championship
  - Champions (2): 1928, 1935

==== Women ====
- Greek Championship
  - Champions (4): 1967, 1968, 1971, 1972

=== Volleyball ===
==== Men ====
- Greek Championship
  - Champions (5): 2002, 2005, 2007, 2008, 2012
- Greek Cup
  - Winners (6): 2000, 2002, 2004, 2005, 2006, 2012
- Greek Super Cup
  - Winners (4): 2004, 2005, 2007, 2008

=== Αthletics ===
==== Men ====
- Greek Championship
  - Champions (6): 1975, 1976, 1979, 1984, 1985, 1986
- Greek Cup
  - Winners (2): 1979, 1990

==== Women ====
- Greek Championship
  - Champions (1): 1991
- Greek Cross Country Championship
  - Champions (6): 1967, 1981, 1990, 1991, 1992, 2009
- Greek Cup
  - Winners (3): 1989, 1990, 1991

=== Rugby ===
==== Men ====
- Greek Rugby Union Championship
  - Champions (1): 2013
- Greek Rugby Sevens Championship
  - Champions (2): 2013, 2014

==== Women ====
- Greek Rugby Sevens Championship
  - Champions (2): 2014, 2024

=== Fencing ===
==== Men ====
- Greek Épée Team Championship
  - Champions (1): 1983

==== Women ====
- Greek Foil Team Championship
  - Champions (1): 1978

=== Freestyle wrestling ===
==== Men ====
- Greek Championship
  - Champions (11): 2000, 2001, 2002, 2003, 2004, 2005, 2006, 2007, 2008, 2009, 2010

== European honours ==
Season	Men's Association Football	Men's Basketball	Men's Volleyball
1984–85	Balkans Cup; Winner		
1994–95		FIBA European Cup; Semi-finals	
1996–97		FIBA EuroCup; Semi-finals	
2001–02			CEV Champions League; 3rd place
2003–04			CEV Champions League; 4th place
2004–05			CEV Champions League; 2nd place
2005–06			CEV Champions League; 2nd place
2008–09			CEV Champions League; 2nd place

== Notable supporters ==
- Grigoris Arnaoutoglou, TV presenter
- Thodoris Atheridis, actor
- Nikos Chatzivrettas, basketball player, former Iraklis player
- Athanasios Giannousis, former Mayor of Thessaloniki
- Konstantinos Karamanlis, former Prime Minister of Greece
- Georgios Lianis, former Minister of Sports, politician
- Georgios Katsanis, former Iraklis athlete, special forces in the 1974 Cyprus war
- Savvas Kofidis, football player and coach, former Iraklis captain
- Nikos Kouvelas, basketball player, former Iraklis player
- Sotiris Kouvelas, former Mayor of Thessaloniki, former member of Hellenic Parliament
- Andrej Kravárik, Slovak volleyball player, Greek champion with Iraklis
- Alekos Leonis, volleyball player and coach, Greek champion with Iraklis
- Giannis Mangriotis, politician, former Minister of Macedonia-Thrace
- Theodoros Karaoglou, politician, former member of Hellenic Parliament
- Lefteris Kakiousis, basketball player and coach, former Iraklis captain and coach
- Konstantinos Kosmopoulos, former Mayor of Thessaloniki
- Lazaros Kyrizoglou, former mayor of Ampelokipi, Thessaloniki
- Theocharis Manavis, former Mayor of Thessaloniki
- Jerzy Iwanow-Szajnowicz, former Iraklis athlete, saboteur during German Occupation (1941–1944)
- Anastasios Katsabis, footballer, former Iraklis captain
- Ieroklis Michailidis, actor
- Giorgos Orfanos, former Minister of Sports, politician
- Lazaros Papadopoulos, basketball player, 2005 European champion, former Iraklis player
- Michalis Papadopoulos, former Mayor of Thessaloniki
- Daniil Papadopoulos, football player and coach, former Iraklis captain
- Vangelis Kousoulakis, former football player
- Lakis Papaioannou, former football player
- Eleana Papaioannou, singer
- Antonis Remos, singer
- Dimitris Starovas, musician, actor
- Paschalis Terzis, singer
- Polina Trigonidou, model, journalist, volleyball player
- Fanis Toutziaris, footballer, former Iraklis player
- Dimitris Verginis, basketball player, former Iraklis player

== See also ==
- Iraklis F.C. (Thessaloniki)
- List of Iraklis Thessaloniki F.C. players
- List of Iraklis F.C. seasons
- G.S. Iraklis Thessaloniki (men's basketball)
- Iraklis B.C. in international competitions
- G.S. Iraklis Thessaloniki (women's basketball)
- Ivanofeio Sports Arena
- G.S. Iraklis Thessaloniki (men's volleyball)
- G.S. Iraklis Thessaloniki (women's volleyball)
- G.S. Iraklis Thessaloniki (water polo)
- G.S. Iraklis Thessaloniki (rugby)
