= Robert Szczot =

Polish footballer

Personal information
- Full name: Robert Szczot
- Date of birth: 31 January 1982 (age 44)
- Place of birth: Oleśnica, Poland
- Height: 1.76 m (5 ft 9 in)
- Position: Midfielder

Team information
- Current team: Lotnik Twardogóra
- Number: 10

Senior career*
Years	Team	Apps	(Gls)
2001	Lotnik Twardogóra		
2002–2005	Śląsk Wrocław	29	(0)
2005–2006	R.A.E.C. Mons	17	(2)
2006	Śląsk Wrocław	8	(0)
2006–2008	ŁKS Łódź	29	(4)
2008	Jagiellonia Białystok	14	(1)
2009–2010	Górnik Zabrze	38	(4)
2010–2011	Iraklis	9	(0)
2011–2012	ŁKS Łódź	4	(0)
2012–2016	Olimpia Grudziądz	97	(7)
2021–2022	Zenit Międzybórz	13	(0)
2022–	Lotnik Twardogóra	31	(5)
- * Club domestic league appearances and goals

Robert Szczot (born 31 January 1982) is a Polish footballer who plays as a midfielder for Klasa A club Lotnik Twardogóra.

He was equally adept in playing both in the right and left flank of the midfield.

== Career ==
=== Early career ===
Szczot started his career for the amateur club Lotnik Twardogóra and continued in 2002 for Śląsk Wrocław. He continued to play for Śląsk Wrocław in the second tier until the 2004–05 season.

=== RAEC Mons ===
Szczot chose to play abroad for the 2005–06 season and signed for the Belgian club R.A.E.C. Mons. He debuted for the club in the opening day of the league in an away 1–1 draw against Royal Antwerp F.C. His first goal in the Belgian Second Division was scored i a 4–1 home win against R.U. Saint-Gilloise. In the end of the season he totalled 16 matches and 2 goals in the league. R.A.E.C. Mons won the championship and thus gained promotion to the Jupiler Pro League.

=== Return to Poland ===
After his season in Belgium, he returned in his former club Śląsk Wrocław. In the January transfer window he signed for Ekstraklasa outfit ŁKS Łódź. He debuted for his new club in a 2–1 away defeat against Wisła Płock. He featured in one more game in the season, totalling a modest two appearances. In his second season for the club, Szczot gained a spot in the starting eleven. He scored his first goal and handed an assist in the opening day of the 2007–08 Ekstraklasa season, and at the end of the season, he had 27 appearances for ŁKS Łódź and contributed four goals in his club's campaign. In the next season, Szczot signed for Jagiellonia Białystok. He debuted for the club in its first match of the season, an away 1–1 draw against Arka Gdynia. He managed to score a goal for the club in a 2–0 home win over Lechia Gdańsk. He made 14 appearances for the club before signing for former giants Górnik Zabrze. He managed to make 13 appearances and scored one goal for his new club, but the end of the season found Górnik Zabrze relegated into the I liga. In the 2009–10 season, Szczot was a key player in Górnik's campaign to the second, promotion gaining, position, making 25 appearances and scoring three goals.

=== Iraklis ===
Szczot became the third transfer of Iraklis for the 2010–11 season. He debuted for Iraklis in a winning 1–0 home match against AEL, coming in as a substitute for Kobayashi in the 74th minute.

=== ŁKS Łódź ===
In August 2011, he rejoined ŁKS Łódź.

== Honours ==
RAEC Mons

- Belgian Second Division: 2005–06
