= Aurel Munteanu =

Romanian footballer and businessman (born 1955)

Personal information
- Full name: Aurel Eugen Munteanu
- Date of birth: 28 January 1955 (age 71)
- Place of birth: Sibiu, Romania
- Position: Defensive midfielder

Senior career*
Years	Team	Apps	(Gls)
1972–1973	CSM Sibiu	8	(1)
1973–1974	Șoimii Sibiu	20	(1)
1974–1986	Sportul Studențesc București	202	(9)
1986–1987	Petrolul Ploiești	7	(0)
Total		237	(11)
- * Club domestic league appearances and goals

Aurel Eugen Munteanu (born 28 January 1955) is a Romanian former football midfielder.

== Playing career ==
Munteanu was born on 28 January 1955 in Sibiu, Romania. He began his senior football career in 1972 at Divizia B club CSM Sibiu, moving one year later to Șoimii Sibiu in the same league.

In 1973, Munteanu joined Sportul Studențesc București, making his Divizia A debut on 25 August 1974 under coach Angelo Niculescu in a 2–0 home victory against Universitatea Craiova. His first achievement was reaching the 1976 Balkans Cup final, where he played and scored a goal in the second leg of the 5–4 aggregate loss to Dinamo Zagreb. Afterwards, the team reached the 1979 Cupa României final, but coach Mircea Rădulescu did not use him in the 3–0 loss to Steaua București. He won the only trophy of his career by playing in the first leg of Sportul's 3–1 aggregate win over Rijeka in the 1979–80 Balkans Cup final. During his time with The Students, Munteanu made seven appearances in the UEFA Cup over the course of four seasons, helping his side eliminate Olympiacos in the first round of the 1976–77 campaign. He featured in another first-round highlight during the 1984–85 edition, securing a historic 1–0 victory against Inter Milan, though the team was eliminated after a 2–0 loss in the second leg. Domestically, in the 1985–86 season, he helped Sportul finish second in the championship.

After 12 seasons spent at Sportul, Munteanu went to Petrolul Ploiești. There, he made his last Divizia A appearance on 18 October 1986 in a 3–0 away loss to Dinamo București, totaling 209 matches with nine goals in the competition.

== After retirement ==
After ending his football career, Munteanu became a businessman. His fortune is estimated by the Romanian press at figures between €85 – 87 million.

== Honours ==
Sportul Studențesc București

- Divizia A runner-up: 1985–86
- Cupa României runner-up: 1978–79
- Balkans Cup: 1979–80, runner-up 1976
