= Ion Munteanu (footballer) =

Romanian former footballer

Personal information
- Date of birth: 7 June 1955
- Place of birth: Burila Mare, Mehedinti, Romania
- Date of death: 24 March 2006 (aged 50)
- Place of death: Bucharest, Romania
- Position: Left back

Youth career
- 1965–1967: Steaua "23 August"
- 1967–1974: Autobuzul București

Senior career*
Years	Team	Apps	(Gls)
1974–1978	Autobuzul București		
1979–1988	Sportul Studențesc București	281	(30)
1989	Chimia Râmnicu Vâlcea		

International career^{‡}
1980	Romania Olympic	1	(0)
1979–1984	Romania	23	(0)
- * Club domestic league appearances and goals as of 27 December 2019 ‡ National team caps and goals as of 27 December 2019

Ion Munteanu (7 June 1955 – 24 March 2006) was a Romanian footballer who played as a left back for Autobuzul București, Sportul Studențesc București and Chimia Râmnicu Vâlcea.

== Club career ==
Munteanu was born on 7 June 1955 in Burila Mare, Mehedinti , Romania and began playing junior-level football in 1965 at Steaua "23 August". Two years later he moved to Autobuzul București where in the 1974–75 Divizia B season he would start his senior career. In his second season, Autobuzul was relegated to Divizia C, but he stayed with the club, helping it get promoted back after one year.

In 1979, Munteanu joined Sportul Studențesc of Bucharest where he would be teammates with players such as Gheorghe Hagi, Mircea Sandu, Marcel Coraș, Aurel Țicleanu and Paul Cazan. He made his Divizia A debut on 22 April 1979 under coach Mircea Rădulescu in Sportul's 1–0 away loss to Jiul Petroșani. His first performance was reaching the 1979 Cupa României final where Rădulescu used him as a starter, but replaced him at half time with Mircea Sandu in the eventual 3–0 loss to Steaua București. In the 1983–84 season, he netted a personal record of seven goals, while in the 1985–86 championship he helped Sportul to a runner-up position. During his time with The Students, Munteanu played 13 matches with two goals scored in the UEFA Cup over the course of four seasons, most notably playing in a historical 1–0 victory against Inter Milan in the first round of the 1984–85 season, but did not qualify further as they lost 2–0 in the second leg. In the 1987–88 edition, he helped them get past GKS Katowice, then Peter Schmeichel and Brian Laudrup's Brøndby, winning the second leg 3–0 after an away loss by the same score, securing a historic penalty shootout qualification to the third round where they were defeated by Hellas Verona. He made his last Divizia A appearance on 11 December 1988, playing in a 1–0 win over Inter Sibiu, having a total of 281 matches with 30 goals in the competition, all of them for Sportul Studențesc.

Munteanu ended his career in 1989 at Divizia B club Chimia Râmnicu Vâlcea. Afterwards he worked as coach at the children and junior center of Sportul Studențesc.

== International career ==
Munteanu played 23 matches for Romania, making his debut on 14 October 1979 under coach Constantin Cernăianu in a 3–1 friendly loss against the Soviet Union. He made two appearances during the Euro 1980 qualifiers and played in both legs of the 4–3 aggregate victory over Yugoslavia in the 1977–80 Balkan Cup final. Afterwards he played seven matches during the 1982 World Cup qualifiers, including a 2–1 win and a 0–0 draw against England. Munteanu's last game for the national team was a 1–1 friendly draw against Israel which took place on 21 November 1984.

== Death ==
He died on 24 March 2006 at age 50 because of cirrhosis.

== Honours ==
Autobuzul București

- Divizia C: 1976–77

Sportul Studențesc

- Divizia A runner-up: 1985–86
- Cupa României runner-up: 1978–79
- Balkans Cup: 1979–80

Romania

- Balkan Cup: 1977–80
