= Gino Iorgulescu =

Romanian footballer (born 1956)

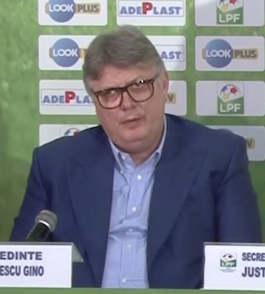
- Iorgulescu in 2014

Personal information
- Full name: George Iorgulescu
- Date of birth: 15 May 1956 (age 70)
- Place of birth: Giurgiu, Romania
- Height: 1.91 m (6 ft 3 in)
- Position: Centre-back

Youth career
- 1971–1973: Dunărea Giurgiu

Senior career*
Years	Team	Apps	(Gls)
1973–1975	Dunărea Giurgiu	32	(0)
1975–1989	Sportul Studențesc București	326	(49)
1976–1977	→ Progresul București (loan)	28	(6)
1989–1990	Beerschot VAC	2	(0)
Total		388	(55)

International career
1981–1986	Romania (Note: Including one appearance and one goal for Romania's Olympic team.)	49	(3)

Managerial career
- 1990–1993: Romania (assistant)
- 1999: Național București (caretaker)
- * Club domestic league appearances and goals

George "Gino" Iorgulescu (born 15 May 1956) is a Romanian former professional footballer who played as a defender. He is the current chairman of the Romanian Professional Football League.

== Club career ==
Iorgulescu was born on 15 May 1956 in Giurgiu, Romania and began playing junior-level football at local club Dunărea, making his debut for the senior squad during the 1973–74 Divizia B season. Iorgulescu was transferred alongside Dunărea teammate Calianu to Sportul Studențesc București, where he made his Divizia A debut under coach Angelo Niculescu on 31 August 1975 in a 1–1 draw against Universitatea Craiova. That was his only appearance in that season, being used more often by Mircea Rădulescu with the team's youth squad. In the next season, he was loaned to fellow Divizia A team, Progresul București, where he made 28 appearances with six goals scored. Afterwards, he returned to Sportul Studențesc when Rădulescu became the coach of the senior squad and gave him more playing time. Iorgulescu spent the following 12 seasons at Sportul Studențesc, making a strong partnership in the central defence with Paul Cazan. The highlights of this period were 12 goals scored in the 1977–78 season, a second position in the 1985–86 season and playing the entire match under coach Rădulescu in the 3–0 loss to Steaua București in the 1979 Cupa României final. Iorgulescu also helped the club reach the 1976 Balkans Cup final, but he did not play in the 5–4 aggregate loss to Dinamo Zagreb. He eventually won the competition by playing in both legs of the 3–1 aggregate win over Rijeka in the final of the 1979–80 edition. Iorgulescu represented The Students in 14 UEFA Cup matches, scoring two goals. Among these games was a 1–0 victory against Inter Milan in the first round of the 1984–85 edition, though they did not qualify further after a 2–0 second-leg loss. In the 1987–88 edition, he helped them get past GKS Katowice, then Peter Schmeichel and Brian Laudrup's Brøndby, winning the second leg 3–0 after an away loss by the same score, securing a historic penalty shootout qualification to the third round where they were defeated by Hellas Verona. For the way he played in 1982, Iorgulescu was placed fifth in the ranking for the Romanian Footballer of the Year award. Iorgulescu made his last Divizia A appearance on 20 June 1989 in Sportul's 2–1 victory against Argeș Pitești in which he scored a goal, totaling 354 appearances with 55 goals in the competition and 25 matches with four goals in the Cupa României. He ended his playing career after being allowed by the communist regime to play abroad at Beerschot VAC for which he made only two appearances in the 1989–90 Belgian First Division.

== International career ==
Iorgulescu played 48 games and scored two goals for Romania, making his debut on 11 November 1981 under coach Mircea Lucescu in a 0–0 draw against Switzerland in the 1982 World Cup qualifiers. He played in seven games during the successful Euro 1984 qualifiers, including a 1–0 win over World Cup holders, Italy in which he had a praised performance after he annihilated his direct opponent Paolo Rossi. He was used by coach Lucescu in the 1–1 draw against Spain and the 1–0 loss to Portugal in the final tournament as Romania did not get past the group stage. Iorgulescu played seven games in the 1986 World Cup qualifiers where he scored a goal in a 3–1 away victory against Turkey. In his following game, which was a friendly that ended in a 2–2 draw against Egypt, he scored again and was the team's captain for the first time. Iorgulescu's last appearance for the national team took place on 8 October 1986 when coach Emerich Jenei sent him in the 80th minute to replace Gheorghe Hagi in a 4–2 away victory in a friendly against Israel.

For representing his country at the Euro 1984 final tournament, Iorgulescu was decorated by President of Romania Traian Băsescu on 25 March 2008 with the Ordinul "Meritul Sportiv" – (The Medal "The Sportive Merit") class III.

=== International goals ===
Scores and results list Romania's goal tally first, score column indicates score after each Iorgulescu goal.

Goal	Date	Venue	Opponent	Score	Result	Competition
1	13 November 1985	Atatürk Stadium, İzmir, Turkey	Turkey	1–0	3–1	1986 World Cup qualifiers
2	28 February 1986	Al-Iskandarīyah Stadium, Alexandria, Egypt	Egypt	2–1	2–2	Friendly

== After retirement ==
After he retired from his playing career, Iorgulescu started working in 1990 as an assistant of Mircea Rădulescu at Romania's national team. When Rădulescu was replaced with Cornel Dinu in 1991, Iorgulescu remained in Dinu's staff as an assistant, but they both left in June 1993 following a 5–2 loss in Košice to Czechoslovakia in the 1994 World Cup qualifiers. From 1994 until 2005 Iorgulescu was president of Național București, a period in which the club finished three times as runner-up in the Divizia A championship and reached the 1997 and 2003 Cupa României finals which were both lost to Steaua București and Dinamo București respectively. During his presidency at Național he was known as a trailblazer as he appointed coaches for the team such as Walter Zenga, Roberto Landi and Cosmin Olăroiu. In 1999 he worked for a while as the team's head coach after José Ramón Alexanko left the club, leading them in 13 rounds of the 1998–99 Divizia A season consisting of six victories, one draw and six losses. Iorgulescu was in the centre of a controversy when, during a game against Rapid București, which was lost with 3–1, he entered the field and chased the referee Constantin Zotta as he felt disadvantaged by his way of refereeing. In 2000 Iorgulescu had a first attempt to become the president of the Romanian Professional Football League but lost to Dumitru Dragomir. However, he ran again against Dragomir in 2013, this time winning the election.

== Honours ==
Sportul Studențesc București

- Balkans Cup: 1979–80, runner-up: 1976
- Divizia A runner-up: 1985–86
- Cupa României runner-up: 1978–79

Individual

- Romanian Footballer of the Year (fifth place): 1982
