= Paul Cazan =

Romanian footballer (born 1951)

Personal information
- Date of birth: 30 September 1951 (age 75)
- Place of birth: Bucharest, Romania
- Height: 1.89 m (6 ft 2 in)
- Position: Centre-back

Youth career
- 1967: 23 August București
- 1970: TUG București

Senior career*
| Years | Team | Apps | (Gls) |
| 1970–1971 | TM București | 30 | (0) |
| 1971 | Steaua București | 0 | (0) |
| 1972 | Chimia Râmnicu Vâlcea | 8 | (0) |
| 1972–1987 | Sportul Studențesc | 465 | (10) |
| Total | | 503 | (10) |

International career
| 1974 | Romania U23 | 2 | (0) |
| 1983 | Romania Olympic | 2 | (0) |

Managerial career
- 1987–1988: Sportul Studențesc
Medal record
Representing Romania
Universiade
| Gold medal – first place | 1974 Nice | Team |
- * Club domestic league appearances and goals

Paul Cazan (born 30 September 1951 in Bucharest) is a Romanian former football player and former coach who mostly played and coached for Sportul Studențesc of Bucharest.

== Club career ==
Cazan, nicknamed "Ață" (Yarn), was born on 30 September 1951 in Bucharest, Romania and first played basketball, before starting football at junior level in 1967 at "23 August" București, moving in 1970 to TUG București. He began his senior football career in the 1970–71 Divizia C season at TM București. Subsequently, he moved to Steaua București for half a season without playing, before transferring to Chimia Râmnicu Vâlcea in Divizia B, where he played eight games and contributed to avoiding relegation. Cazan made his Divizia A debut on 14 December 1972, playing for Sportul Studențesc under coach Gheorghe Ola in a 3–0 loss to Jiul Petroșani. He stayed with Sportul until the end of his career, spanning 16 Divizia A seasons in which he made a club record of 465 appearances of which 444 as a starter, scoring 10 goals. Cazan made a strong partnership in the central defense with Gino Iorgulescu, serving for many years as captain of a team that included players such as Gheorghe Hagi, Mircea Sandu, Marcel Coraș and Aurel Rădulescu. The highlights of his period spent with The Students were a second place in the 1985–86 season and reaching a Cupa României final in 1979 in which coach Mircea Rădulescu used him the entire match in the 3–0 loss to Steaua. Cazan represented the club in 13 UEFA Cup matches, including three games in the 1976–77 campaign, as his side advanced past Olympiacos in the first round, before they were defeated by Schalke 04 in the following round. He also played in a 1–0 victory against Inter Milan in the first round of the 1984–85 edition, but they were defeated 2–0 in the second leg. Sportul reached the 1976 Balkans Cup final, where Cazan played in both legs and scored a goal in the 5–4 aggregate loss to Dinamo Zagreb. He eventually won the competition by playing in both legs of the 3–1 aggregate win over Rijeka in the final of the 1979–80 edition. In the 1987–88 UEFA Cup campaign, Cazan started as a player, appearing in the 1–0 victory in the first round against GKS Katowice which helped the team advance to the second round. There, as the team's head coach, he faced Peter Schmeichel and Brian Laudrup's Brøndby, winning the second leg 3–0 after an away loss by the same score, securing a historic penalty shootout qualification to the third round where they were defeated by Hellas Verona. As the team finished domestically in 14th place in that season, Cazan was dismissed and gave up coaching, instead working in leadership positions at Sportul Studențesc, Politehnica Timișoara, Rapid București, Universitatea Cluj and UTA Arad.

== International career ==
He won the Universiade gold medal with Romania's students football team in the 1974 edition that was held in France, playing alongside László Bölöni, Gheorghe Mulțescu, Dan Păltinișanu and Romulus Chihaia. Even though he played for Romania's under-23 and Olympic team, Cazan never played for Romania's senior team. On 13 May 2020, Gazeta Sporturilor included him on a list of best Romanian players who never played for the senior national team.

== Personal life ==
His son, Lucian Cazan, was also a footballer who played for Sportul Studențesc.

== Honours ==
Sportul Studențesc

- Balkans Cup: 1979–80, runner-up 1976
- Divizia A runner-up: 1985–86
- Cupa României runner-up: 1978–79
