= Răducanu Necula =

Romanian footballer

Rică Răducanu
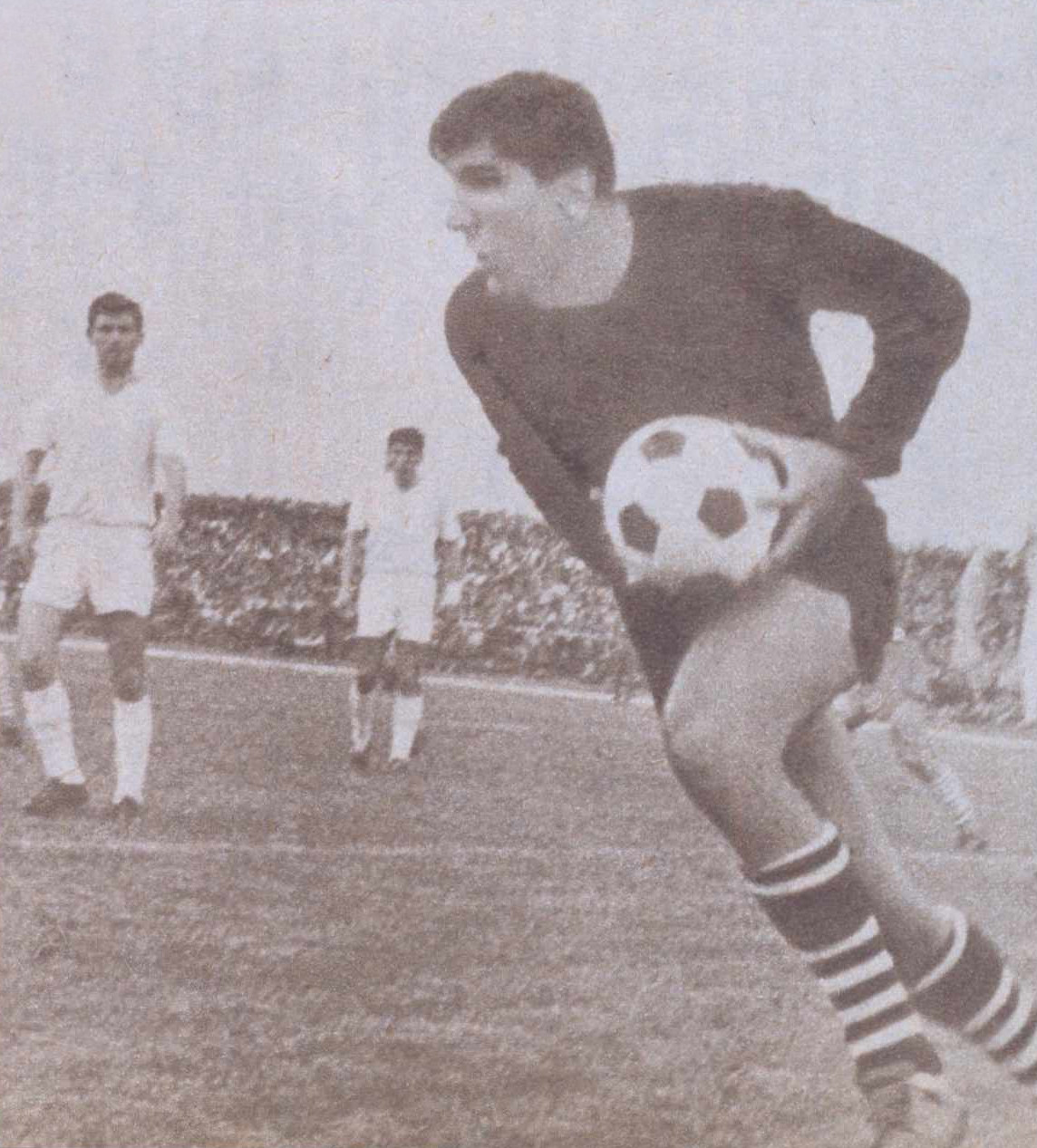
- Răducanu with Rapid București in 1966

Personal information
- Full name: Răducan Necula
- Date of birth: 10 May 1946 (age 80)
- Place of birth: Vlădeni, Ialomița, Romania
- Height: 1.89 m (6 ft 2 in)
- Position: Goalkeeper

Youth career
- 1958–1959: Victoria MIBC București
- 1959–1964: Flacăra Roșie București

Senior career*
Years	Team	Apps	(Gls)
1964–1965	Flacăra Roșie București		
1965–1975	Rapid București	233	(7)
1975–1978	Sportul Studențesc București	88	(0)
1978–1979	Steaua București	22	(0)
1979–1980	FCM Reșița		
1980	FC Baia Mare	10	(0)
1980–1981	Autobuzul București		
1981–1982	Spartac București		
1982	Voința Crevedia		
2001–2003	Senaco Novaci		
Total		353	(7)

International career
	Romania U23	11	(0)
1967–1978	Romania (Note: Including 5 appearances for Romania's Olympic team.)	61	(0)
- * Club domestic league appearances and goals

Răducan Necula (born 10 May 1946), widely known as Rică Răducanu, is a retired Romanian football goalkeeper.

== Club career ==
=== Early career ===
Răducanu, nicknamed "Tamango" after the character played by Alex Cressan from the 1958 movie Tamango, was born on 18 May 1946 in Vlădeni, Ialomița, Romania, but grew up in the Giulești neighborhood of Bucharest. He started to play football in 1958 in the offence at Victoria MIBC București. He later moved to Divizia C club Flacăra Roșie București where coach Sandu Frățilă started using him as a goalkeeper. Frățilă gave him his senior debut in a 1–0 victory in the 1963–64 Cupa României against Divizia A club Progresul București in which he saved a penalty from Nicolae Oaidă.

=== Rapid București ===
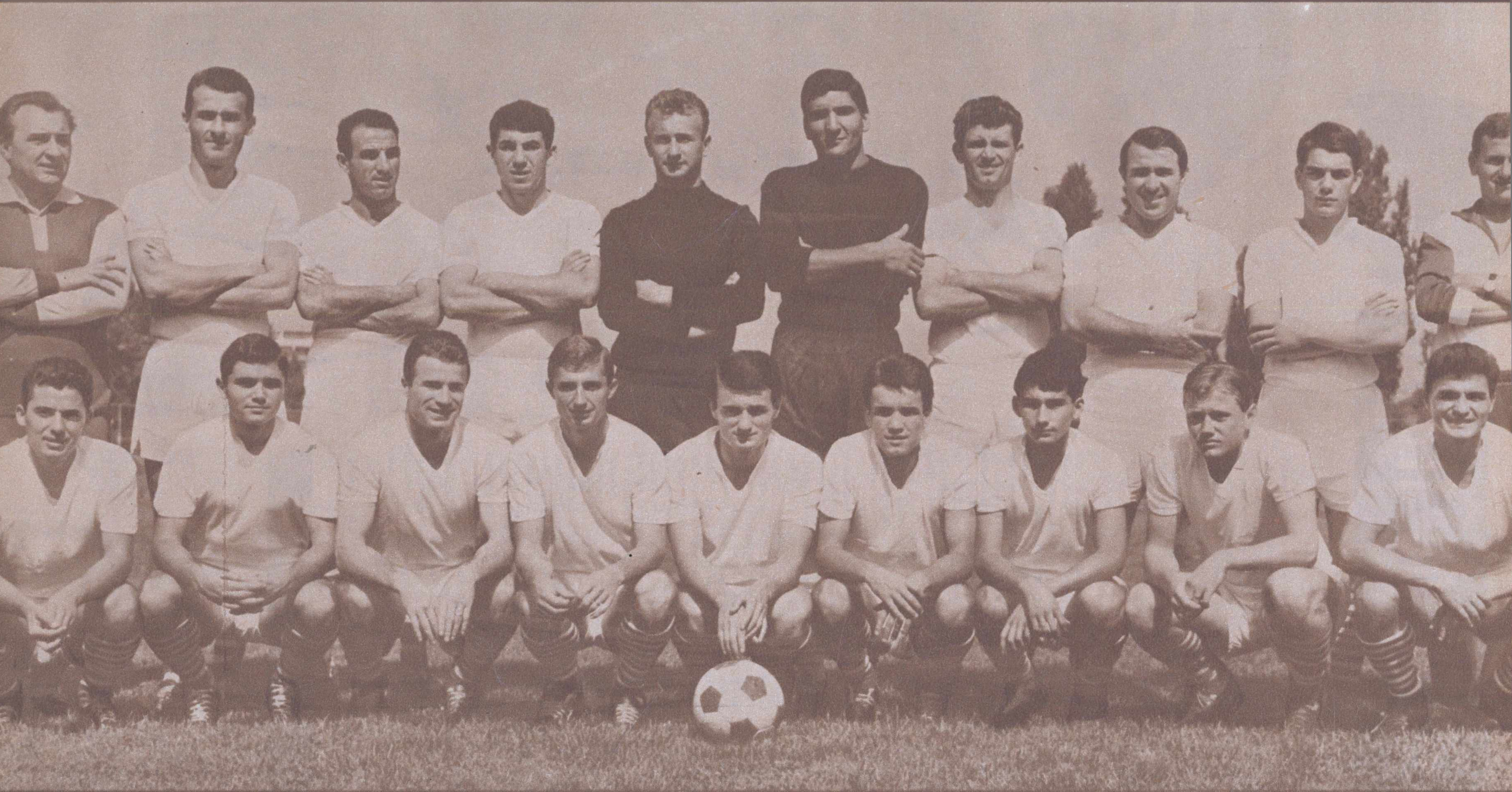
Răducanu (center, back row) with Rapid București in 1965

He was noticed by Rapid București's coach, Valentin Stănescu, who brought him to the Giulești team, giving him his Divizia A debut on 8 May 1966 in a 2–1 home loss to Siderurgistul Galați. In the following season, Stănescu used Răducanu in 24 league games, as the club won its first title. Afterwards he played four games in the 1967–68 European Cup, helping The Railwaymen eliminate Trakia Plovdiv and advance to the following round where they were eliminated by Juventus. In the following years, he won two Cupa României in the 1971–72 and 1974–75 editions, but played only in the 1972 final when under coach Bazil Marian he kept a clean sheet in the 2–0 win over Jiul Petroșani. He participated in all six matches of Rapid's 1971–72 UEFA Cup campaign as the team reached the round of 16 by eliminating Napoli and Legia Warsaw before falling to the eventual tournament winners, Tottenham. He also played in all six games during the 1972–73 European Cup Winners' Cup, helping the team reach the quarter-finals by defeating Landskrona BoIS and Rapid Wien prior to their elimination by the eventual finalists, Leeds United. The following day after the 5–0 away loss to Leeds, the team had a meeting with the club's officials at which writer Eugen "Jean" Barbu, who was also at the game, participated. Barbu criticized the team for not having the devotion and the spirit of sacrifice as the English players, at one point talking directly to Răducanu who replied with a rhetorical question:"Well come on, Mr. Jean, do you write like Shakespeare?". For the way he played in 1970, Răducanu was placed second in the ranking for the Romanian Footballer of the Year award, then in 1976 being fourth. Răducanu was also a goalscoring goalkeeper, scoring three goals from penalty kicks in the 1973–74 Divizia A season against CFR Cluj, Politehnica Iași and Politehnica Timișoara. In the same season he became the first goalkeeper from Romanian football that was caught in offside in a game against Farul Constanța. However, the team was relegated at the end of that season, but he stayed with the club, scoring another four penalty goals in 30 appearances to help it get promoted back to the first division after one year.

=== Sportul and Steaua ===
In 1975, Răducanu left Rapid after 10 seasons to join Sportul Studențesc București. The team reached the 1976 Balkans Cup final, where he played in both legs of the 5–4 aggregate loss to Dinamo Zagreb. In the 1976–77 UEFA Cup first round, he scored a goal from a penalty kick in the 4–2 aggregate victory against Olympiacos, helping Sportul reach the next phase of the competition. In 1978, his friend Nicu Ceaușescu, who was the son of dictator Nicolae Ceaușescu, brought him to Steaua București. Răducanu helped the team win the 1978–79 Cupa României, being used by coach Gheorghe Constantin in the final as a starter until the 84th minute when he was replaced with Vasile Iordache in the 3–0 win over his former side, Sportul Studențesc.

=== Late career ===
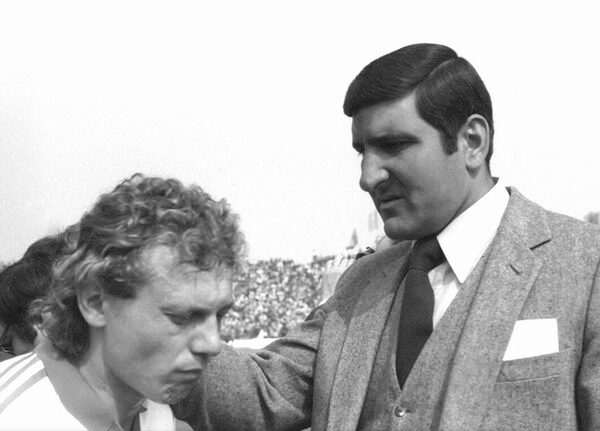
Răducanu consoles Ilie Balaci after Craiova's elimination by Benfica in the 1983 UEFA Cup semifinal.

Afterwards, Răducanu spent a short period at Divizia B team FCM Reșița. He was brought back to Divizia A by coach Viorel Mateianu at FC Baia Mare. However, he did not adapt there, playing only 10 league games, including his last appearance in the competition which took place on 18 October 1980 in a 3–1 away loss to Politehnica Timișoara. Răducanu ended his career playing in the Romanian lower leagues at Autobuzul București, Spartac București and Voința Crevedia. He came out of retirement in 2001 at Senaco Novaci where he completely ended his career in 2003 at age 57. Răducanu was a goalkeeper known for his great saves, but also for his big mistakes and for his joy of entertaining the public with his juggling abilities. Throughout his career, he accumulated a total of 329 games with three goals in Divizia A and 26 matches with one goal in European competitions (including three games in the Inter-Cities Fairs Cup). Years later after he retired, Răducanu described his style of play:"As a coach, I wouldn't really like to have someone like Rică. But I was encouraged by the stands from behind to do all kinds of tricks! The 'offside' thing happened in 1974, in a match I played with Rapid against Farul, on "23 August". We were fighting to avoid relegation and I had to do everything possible in order to not lose the match".

== International career ==
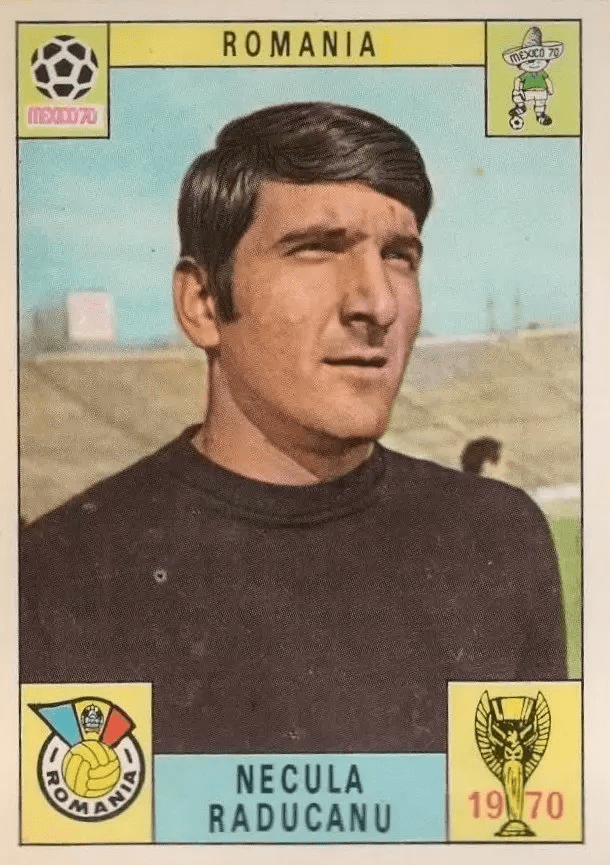
Răducanu in 1970 with Romania, featured on a Panini card

Răducanu played 56 games for Romania in which he conceded 54 goals, making his debut under coach Angelo Niculescu on 25 June 1967 in a 1–0 home loss to Italy in the Euro 1968 qualifiers. He played four games during the successful 1970 World Cup qualifiers. Coach Niculescu used him in the 3–2 loss against Brazil in the final tournament when he replaced Stere Adamache in the 29th minute and conceded a goal from Pelé. That was the first goalkeeper substitution in World Cup history. However, The Tricolours failed to progress from their group. He played nine matches in the 1972 Euro qualifiers, managing to reach the quarter-finals where Romania was defeated by Hungary, who advanced to the final tournament. Subsequently, Răducanu played six games in the Euro 1976 qualifiers, appeared in two matches during the 1973–76 Balkan Cup and made three appearances in the 1977–80 Balkan Cup. He made his last appearance for the national team on 25 October 1978 in a 3–2 home victory against Yugoslavia during the Euro 1980 qualifiers.

For representing his country at the 1970 World Cup, Răducanu was decorated by President of Romania Traian Băsescu on 25 March 2008 with the Ordinul "Meritul Sportiv" – (The Medal "The Sportive Merit") class III.

== Personal life ==
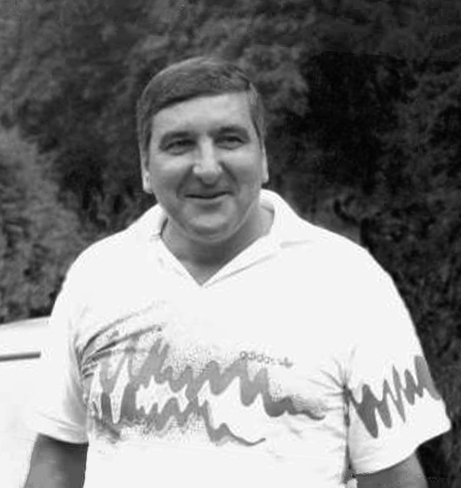
Răducanu c. 1994

His son, Cătălin Necula, was also a footballer. Răducanu was well known for his charisma, being invited in numerous Romanian TV shows. He was also an occasional film actor, playing in the 1978 Totul pentru fotbal (Everything for football) directed by Andrei Blaier and in the 2008 Legiunea străină (The foreign legion) directed by Mircea Daneliuc, both comedy films. After the 1989 Romanian Revolution, he briefly owned a grocery store named Merci Rică in Bucharest's Drumul Taberei neighborhood and a luxury terrace called Sirena (The mermaid) in the Neptun summer resort. Folk singer Victor Socaciu composed a song dedicated to him called Portar sub Podul Grant (Goalkeeper under the Grant Bridge). A book about him was written by Sorin Satmari titled Rică Răducanu sau prea mare pentru un careu atât de mic (Rică Răducanu or too big for such a small penalty box).

In May 2008, Adriean Videanu, the mayor of Bucharest, awarded Răducanu the Honorary Citizen of Bucharest title.

== Honours ==
Rapid București

- Divizia A: 1966–67
- Divizia B: 1974–75
- Cupa României: 1971–72, 1974–75

Sportul Studențesc București

- Balkans Cup runner-up: 1976

Steaua București

- Cupa României: 1978–79

Individual

- Romanian Footballer of the Year runner-up: 1970

== Literature ==
- Satmari, Sorin (1988). Rică Răducanu sau prea mare pentru un careu atât de mic. Editura Romfel. ISBN 973-95794-1-8.
