= Aurel Rădulescu =

Romanian footballer

Personal information
- Date of birth: 13 October 1953
- Place of birth: Adamclisi, Romania
- Date of death: 4 July 1979 (aged 25)
- Place of death: Hanover, Germany
- Height: 1.82 m (6 ft 0 in)
- Positions: Forward; attacking midfielder

Youth career
- 1967–1971: Farul Constanța

Senior career*
Years	Team	Apps	(Gls)
1971–1973	Farul Constanța	25	(2)
1973–1979	Sportul Studențesc București	146	(26)
1974	→ FC Galați (loan)	4	(0)
Total		175	(28)

International career
1973–1977	Romania U21	4	(0)
1974–1979	Romania Olympic	7	(0)
1978	Romania	6	(0)
- * Club domestic league appearances and goals as of 19 January 2020

Aurel Rădulescu (13 October 1953 – 4 July 1979) was a Romanian footballer who played as a forward.

== Club career ==
"Aurel Rădulescu was incredibly talented. In terms of talent, he could be compared to any great Romanian footballer, Dobrin, Iordănescu or Hagi"

— Mircea Rădulescu, former Sportul Studențesc București manager

Rădulescu was born on 13 October 1953 in Adamclisi, Romania as the youngest of five boys in a large family, who later settled in Constanța. He started playing football on a field in the Brătianu neighborhood. Afterwards, he played on his school's field, where he was noticed by Farul Constanța's junior coach, Adam Munteanu, who then brought him to the club. Rădulescu made his Divizia A debut on 2 April 1972, playing under coach Robert Cosmoc in Farul's 3–0 away loss to Steagul Roșu Brașov.

After two seasons, Rădulescu joined Sportul Studențesc București for a six-season spell, with a short interruption in 1974 when he was loaned to FC Galați. He played three matches in the 1976–77 UEFA Cup as The Students got past Olympiacos in the first round, being eliminated by Schalke 04 in the following one. The team reached the 1979 Cupa României final where coach Mircea Rădulescu used him the entire match in the 3–0 loss to Steaua București. They also won the 1979–80 Balkans Cup and reached the final in the 1976 edition. Rădulescu made his last Divizia A appearance on 24 June 1979, playing for Sportul Studențesc in a 1–0 away loss to Olimpia Satu Mare, totaling 171 games with 28 goals in the competition.

== International career ==
Between 1973 and 1979, Rădulescu made several appearances for Romania's under-21 and Olympic teams.

Rădulescu played six games for Romania, making his debut on 5 April 1978 under coach Ștefan Kovacs in a 2–0 friendly loss to Argentina played at Estadio La Bombonera in Buenos Aires. He made a good impression in the game, being praised by journalist Marius Popescu in the Sportul newspaper:"The first player that is a win for the national team - Rădulescu, from Sportul Studentesc. He drives the ball excellently, he is combative, he is technical, he is warm-hearted, he wants to become a footballer of international level. If he maintains his seriousness, modesty, and the conscience of a hardworking boy in training and games, he will definitely get there!". He played two matches in the Euro 1980 qualifiers. On 19 December 1978, Rădulescu made his last appearance for the national team in a 1–1 friendly draw against Israel.

== Death ==
He died on 4 July 1979 at age 25 while jumping out of a moving train in Hanover. Years after his death, his former Sportul Studențesc colleague, Mircea Sandu said:"If it weren't for the misfortune in Germany, Aurică wouldn't have been the second Hagi, Hagi would have been the second Rădulescu!"

== Honours ==
FC Galați

- Divizia B: 1973–74

Sportul Studențesc București

- Balkans Cup: 1979–80, runner-up 1976
- Cupa României runner-up: 1978–79
