= Octavian Ionescu (footballer, born 1949) =

Romanian footballer (born 1949)

Personal information
- Full name: Octavian Andrei Ionescu
- Date of birth: 1 October 1949 (age 77)
- Place of birth: Bucharest, Romania
- Position: Midfielder

Youth career
- 1963–1967: Steaua București

Senior career*
Years	Team	Apps	(Gls)
1968–1969	Universitatea Cluj	10	(1)
1969	Politehnica Galați		
1970–1972	CFR Cluj	65	(19)
1972–1983	Sportul Studențesc București	315	(62)
1983–1984	Olympiakos Nicosia		
Total		390	(82)

International career
1977	Romania U21	1	(0)
1976–1977	Romania B	2	(0)
1976	Romania	2	(0)
- * Club domestic league appearances and goals

Octavian Andrei Ionescu (born 1 October 1949) is a Romanian former footballer who played as a midfielder.

== Club career ==
Ionescu was born on 1 October 1949 in Bucharest, Romania and began playing junior-level football in 1963 at local club Steaua. In 1968, he moved to Universitatea Cluj, making his Divizia A debut on 1 September under coach Constantin Teașcă in a 4–1 home win over Universitatea Craiova. For the first half of the 1969–70 season, he went to Divizia B club Politehnica Galați, before returning to the first league by joining CFR Cluj.

In 1972, Ionescu moved to Sportul Studențesc București. His first achievement there was reaching the 1976 Balkans Cup final, where he played in both legs of the 5–4 aggregate loss to Dinamo Zagreb. Subsequently, he played four matches during the 1976–77 UEFA Cup campaign, scoring a brace to help his side advance past Olympiacos in the first round, before they were defeated by Schalke 04 in the following round. In the same season, he scored a career-best 13 goals in the domestic league. Sportul reached the 1979 Cupa României final and Ionescu played the entire match under coach Mircea Rădulescu in the 3–0 loss to Steaua. He then helped the club win the 1979–80 Balkans Cup by scoring a goal with a header in the 3–1 aggregate win over Rijeka in the final. Ionescu made his last Divizia A appearance on 25 May 1983 in a 2–1 away victory against Corvinul Hunedoara, totaling 390 matches with 82 goals in the competition.

Ionescu ended his career after playing during the 1983–84 Cypriot Second Division season for Olympiakos Nicosia and helping the team finish first to earn promotion to the first league.

== International career ==
From 1976 to 1977, Ionescu played several matches for Romania's under-21 and B sides.

Ionescu played two friendly games for Romania, making his debut on 22 September 1976, when coach Ștefan Kovács sent him in the 66th minute to replace captain Ion Dumitru in a 1–1 home draw against Czechoslovakia. His second appearance took place on 6 October in a 3–2 away loss to the same opponent.

== Honours ==
Sportul Studențesc București

- Cupa României runner-up: 1978–79
- Balkans Cup: 1979–80, runner-up: 1976

Olympiakos Nicosia

- Cypriot Second Division: 1983–84
