= 1979 Cupa României final =

- Event: 1978–79 Cupa României
Steaua București	Sportul Studențesc București
3	0
- Date: 2 July 1979
- Venue: 23 August, Bucharest
- Referee: Nicolae Rainea (Bârlad)
- Attendance: 50,000

The 1979 Cupa României final was the 41st final of Romania's most prestigious football cup competition. It was disputed between Steaua București and Sportul Studențesc București, and was won by Steaua București after a game with 3 goals. It was the 13th cup for Steaua București.

== Match details ==
1 July 1979
17:00 EET

Steaua București	3–0	Sportul Studențesc București
Dumitru 24'; Răducanu 31', 78'	Report

23 August, Bucharest
Attendance: 50,000
Referee: Nicolae Rainea (Bârlad)

GK	1	(Romania) Răducanu Necula (substituted off) 84'
DF	2	(Romania) Teodor Anghelini
DF	3	(Romania) Florin Marin
DF	4	(Romania) Ștefan Sameș
DF	5	(Romania) Ion Nițu
MF	6	(Romania) Ion Dumitru
MF	7	(Romania) Tudorel Stoica
MF	8	(Romania) Anghel Iordănescu
FW	9	(Romania) Marcel Răducanu
FW	10	(Romania) Adrian Ionescu
FW	11	(Romania) Constantin Zamfir
Substitutions:
GK	12	(Romania) Vasile Iordache (substituted in) 84'
Manager:
(Romania) Gheorghe Constantin

GK	1	(Romania) Dumitru Moraru
DF	2	(Romania) Constantin Stroe
DF	3	(Romania) Bruno Grigore
DF	4	(Romania) Paul Cazan
DF	5	(Romania) Ion Munteanu (substituted off) 46'
MF	6	(Romania) Aurel Rădulescu
MF	7	(Romania) Nicolae Tănăsescu
MF	8	(Romania) Octavian Ionescu
FW	9	(Romania) Romulus Chihaia (substituted off) 57'
FW	10	(Romania) Gino Iorgulescu
FW	11	(Romania) Ion Căţoi
Substitutions:
MF	12	(Romania) Mircea Sandu (substituted in) 46'
MF	13	(Romania) Marian Mihail (substituted in) 57'
Manager:
(Romania) Mircea Rădulescu

MATCH OFFICIALS

- Assistant referees:
  - (Romania) Constantin Dinulescu
  - (Romania) Romeo Stâncan

== See also ==
- List of Cupa României finals
