= Victor Niculescu =

Romanian footballer (1949–2024)

Personal information
- Date of birth: 21 April 1949
- Place of birth: Craiova, Romania
- Date of death: 22 August 2024 (aged 75)
- Position: Right-back

Youth career
- 1967–1968: Universitatea Craiova

Senior career*
Years	Team	Apps	(Gls)
1968–1975	Universitatea Craiova	195	(0)
1975–1977	Jiul Petroșani	29	(1)
1977–1978	Corvinul Hunedoara	13	(0)
Total		237	(1)

International career
1968–1972	Romania U23	12	(0)
Medal record
Representing Romania
Universiade
Gold medal – first place	1974 Nice	Team
- * Club domestic league appearances and goals

Victor Niculescu (21 April 1949 – 22 August 2024) was a Romanian footballer who played as a right-back. He was part of "U" Craiova's team that won the 1973–74 Divizia A, which was the first trophy in the club's history.

== Club career ==
Niculescu, nicknamed Fonfo, was born on 21 April 1949 in Craiova, Romania and began playing junior-level football at local club Universitatea. He made his Divizia A debut on 11 August, playing under coach Ștefan Coidum in Universitatea's 3–2 home win over UTA Arad. Niculescu was close to winning the title in the 1972–73 season, but "U" finished in second place on equal points with Dinamo București, losing controversially on the goal difference. This outcome led poet Adrian Păunescu to nickname Craiova as "Campioana unei mari iubiri" (The Champion of a great love). In the first round of the 1973–74 UEFA Cup season, "U" Craiova got past Fiorentina, being eliminated in the following one by Standard Liège, with Niculescu playing all four games in the campaign. In the same season, he was part of Craiova's team that won the league title, which was the club's first trophy, being used by coach Constantin Cernăianu in 28 games. The following season was his last at Craiova, playing in both legs of the 4–3 aggregate loss to Åtvidaberg in the first round of the European Cup. The team reached the 1975 Cupa României final in which Cernăianu used him the entire match in the eventual 2–1 loss against Rapid București.

From 1975 until 1977 he spent two seasons at Jiul Petroșani, a period in which he scored his only Divizia A goal. He spent the last season of his career at Corvinul Hunedoara where on 21 May 1978 he made his final Divizia A appearance, totaling 237 games with one goal in the competition and eight games in European competitions (including two in the Inter-Cities Fairs Cup).

== International career ==
From 1968 until 1972 Niculescu made 12 appearances for Romania's under-23 side.

He won the Universiade gold medal with Romania's students football team in the 1974 edition that was held in France, playing alongside László Bölöni, Gheorghe Mulțescu, Dan Păltinișanu, Romulus Chihaia and Paul Cazan.

== Personal life ==
In 2023, Niculescu received the Honorary Citizen of Craiova title.

He died on 22 August 2024 at age 75.

== Honours ==
Universitatea Craiova

- Divizia A: 1973–74, runner-up 1972–73
- Cupa României runner-up: 1974–75
