= Chihaia =

Chihaia is a Romanian surname. Notable people with the surname include:

- Octavian Chihaia (born 1981), Romanian footballer, son of Romulus
- Pavel Chihaia (1922–2019), Romanian novelist
- Romulus Chihaia (born 1952), Romanian footballer and manager
- Scarlett Bordeaux, ring name of Elizabeth Chihaia (born 1991), American professional wrestler and valet of Romanian descent
