= Mircea Sandu =

Romanian footballer (born 1952)

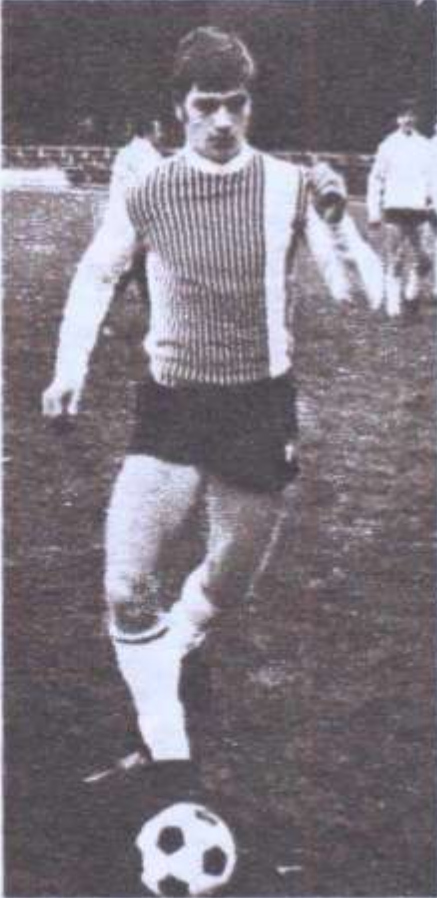
- Sandu with Sportul Studențesc in 1972

Personal information
- Full name: Mircea Traian Sandu
- Date of birth: 22 October 1952 (age 74)
- Place of birth: Bucharest, Romania
- Height: 1.87 m (6 ft 2 in)
- Position: Striker

Youth career
- 1964–1968: Școala Sportivă 2 București
- 1968–1970: Progresul București

Senior career*
| Years | Team | Apps | (Gls) |
| 1970–1971 | Progresul București | 15 | (2) |
| 1971–1986 | Sportul Studențesc București | 416 | (178) |
| 1986–1987 | Gloria Buzău | 5 | (2) |
| Total | | 436 | (182) |

International career
| 1972–1982 | Romania | 18 (Note: Including two appearances and two goals for Romania's Olympic team.) | (6) |
- * Club domestic league appearances and goals

Mircea Traian Sandu (born 22 October 1952) is a Romanian sports administrator and former professional footballer who played as a striker. After retiring as a player, he served as president of the Romanian Football Federation from 1990 to 2014.

Sandu spent his entire playing career in Romania, most notably with Sportul Studențesc București, becoming one of the club's most prolific goal scorers. He was capped 18 times for the Romania national team, scoring six goals from 1972 to 1982.

== Club career ==
Sandu, nicknamed "Nașul" (The Godfather), was born on 22 October 1952 in Bucharest, Romania and began playing junior-level football at Școala Sportivă 2 București and Progresul București. He made his Divizia A debut on 30 August 1970 under coach Victor Stănculescu in Progresul's 1–0 victory against CFR Cluj.

In the next season, Sandu joined Sportul Studențesc București in Divizia B where he scored 15 goals in 28 matches, helping them earn promotion to the first league. For the following 14 seasons, he played for The Students in Divizia A, the highlights of this period included scoring 21 goals in the 1975–76 season and helping the team earn a second position in the 1985–86 season. In the 1979 Cupa României final, during a 3–0 loss to Steaua București, coach Mircea Rădulescu sent him on at halftime to replace Ion Munteanu. Sandu represented Sportul in six UEFA Cup matches in which he scored two goals. One of these goals came from a Gheorghe Hagi assist against goalkeeper Walter Zenga, giving Sportul a 1–0 first-round win over Inter Milan in the 1984–85 edition, though they lost the second leg 2–0. Sportul reached the 1976 Balkans Cup final, where Sandu played in both legs and scored a goal in the 5–4 aggregate loss to Dinamo Zagreb. He eventually won the competition by playing in both legs and scoring once in the 3–1 aggregate win over Rijeka in the final of the 1979–80 edition.

After his period spent at Sportul Studențesc, Sandu went to play for Gloria Buzău for one season. There, he made his last Divizia A appearance on 21 September 1987 in a 1–0 victory against Universitatea Cluj in which he scored the goal. With 167 goals scored in 408 Romanian top-league matches, he is ranked seventh in the all-time scoring table.

== International career ==
Sandu made 16 appearances and scored four goals for Romania, making his debut on 8 April 1972 under coach Angelo Niculescu in a 2–0 friendly victory against France. His following game was Romania's biggest ever victory, a 9–0 win against Finland in the 1974 World Cup qualifiers in which he netted two goals. Sandu also played in a 2–2 draw against Spain in the Euro 1976 qualifiers and played both legs of the successful 1977–80 Balkan Cup final, a 4–3 victory on aggregate against Yugoslavia. His following goals for the national team were in friendlies, a 2–2 draw against East Germany and a 2–1 loss to Israel. He played two games during the 1982 World Cup qualifiers, making his last appearance for the national team in a friendly which ended with a 1–0 victory against Denmark. Sandu also played two games for Romania's Olympic team in the 1976 Summer Olympics qualifiers, scoring two goals in a 2–1 away win over Denmark.

=== International goals ===
Scores and results list Romania's goal tally first, score column indicates score after each Sandu goal.

List of international goals scored by Mircea Sandu
| # | Date | Venue | Cap | Opponent | Score | Result | Competition |
|---|---|---|---|---|---|---|---|
| 1 | 14 October 1973 | 23 August Stadium, Bucharest, Romania | 2 | Finland | 3–0 | 9–0 | 1974 World Cup qualifiers |
| 2 | 14 October 1973 | 23 August Stadium, Bucharest, Romania | 2 | Finland | 8–0 | 9–0 | 1974 World Cup qualifiers |
| 3 | 2 April 1980 | Stadionul 23 August, Bucharest, Romania | 9 | East Germany | 1–0 | 2–2 | Friendly |
| 4 | 8 April 1981 | Bloomfield Stadium, Tel Aviv, Israel | 13 | Israel | 1–1 | 1–2 | Friendly |

== Executive career ==
After he ended his playing career, Sandu was the president of the Romanian Football Federation between 1990 and 2014.

In 1994, Sandu received the Honorary Citizen of Bucharest title. On 25 March 2008 he was decorated by President of Romania Traian Băsescu for Romania's successful Euro 2008 qualifying campaign with the Medalia "Meritul Sportiv" – (The Medal "The Sportive Merit") class III.

== Personal life ==
Sandu's former wife who died in 1995, Simona Arghir, was a handball player and their daughter, Raluca, was a professional tennis player. They also had a son named Dan Mircea. In 1997, he married Lisa Alban.

== Honours ==
Sportul Studențesc

- Balkans Cup: 1979–80, runner-up: 1976
- Divizia A runner-up: 1985–86
- Cupa României runner-up: 1978–79
- Divizia B: 1971–72

Romania

- Balkan Cup: 1977–80
