= Vlădeni, Ialomița =

Vlădeni
- Commune
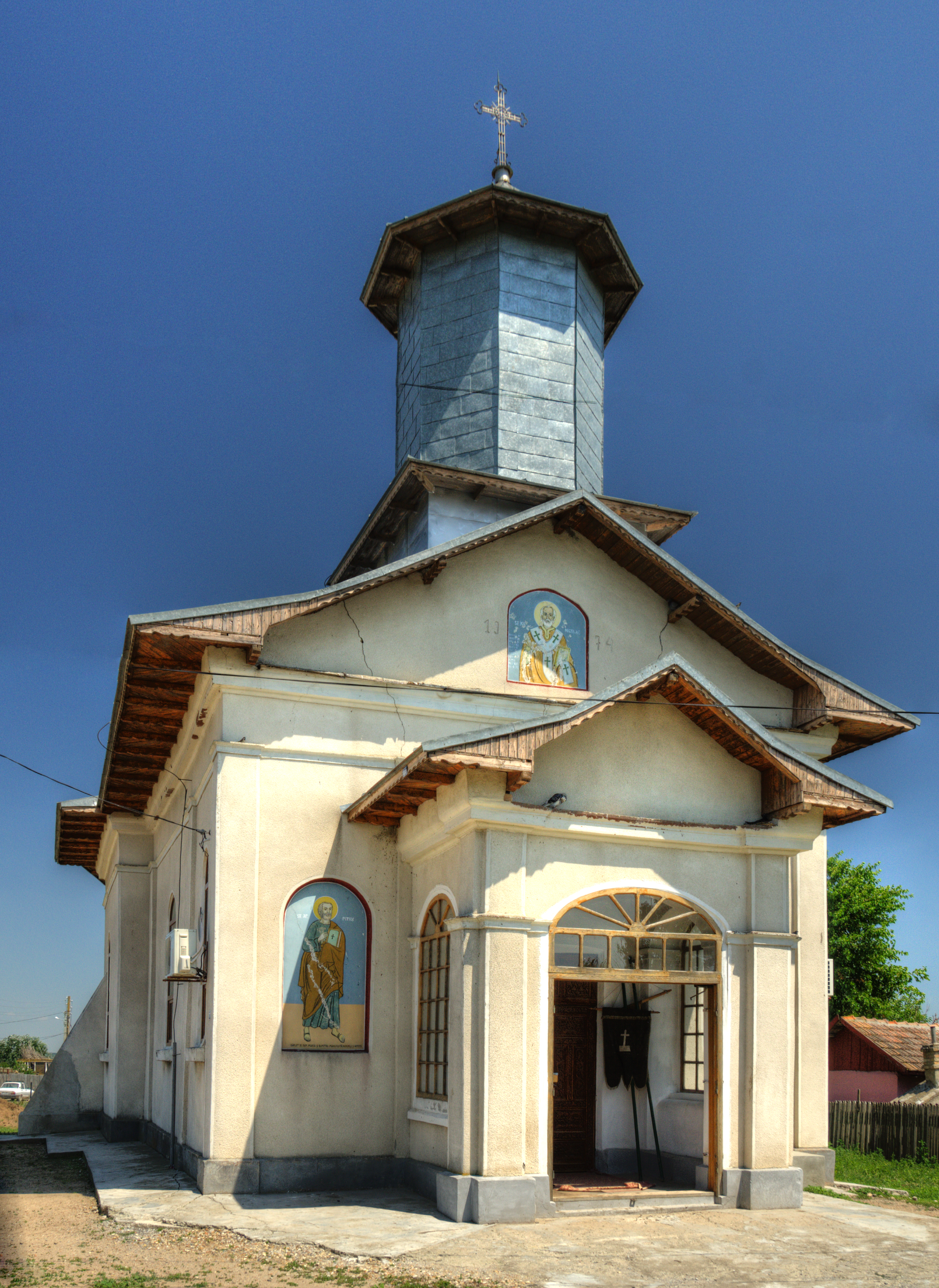
- St. Nicholas Church in Vlădeni

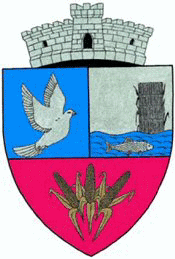
- Coat of arms

- Location in Ialomița County

- Location in Romania
- Coordinates: 44°36′N 27°51′E
- Country: Romania
- County: Ialomița

Government
  - Mayor (2024–2028): Marian Dinu (PNL)
- Area: 129.67 km^{2} (50.07 sq mi)
- Elevation: 12 m (39 ft)
- Population (2021-12-01): 1,870
  - Density: 14.4/km^{2} (37.4/sq mi)
- Time zone: UTC+02:00 (EET)
  - Summer (DST): UTC+03:00 (EEST)
- Postal code: 927250
- Area code: +(40) 243
- Vehicle reg.: IL
- Website: www.primariavladeniil.ro

Vlădeni is a commune located in Ialomița County, Muntenia, Romania. It is composed of a single village, Vlădeni.

The commune is situated on the west bank of the Borcea branch (a section of the Danube).

Historical population
Year	Pop.	±%
1899	984	—
1925	1,302	+32.3%
2002	2,257	+73.3%
2011	2,156	−4.5%
2021	1,870	−13.3%
Source: Census data

== Natives ==
- Răducanu Necula (born 1946), football goalkeeper
