= 1992–93 Balkans Cup =

Tournament details
- Teams: 6

Final positions
- Champions: (Greece) Edessaikos (1st title)
- Runners-up: (Bulgaria) Etar Veliko Tarnovo

Tournament statistics
- Matches played: 10
- Goals scored: 26 (2.6 per match)

The 1992–93 season of the Balkans Cup club tournament was the 27th season of the competition. It was won by Greek side Edessaikos in the final against Bulgarian Etar Veliko Tarnovo for their first title in the competition.

== Quarter-finals ==
Team 1	Agg.	Team 2	1st leg	2nd leg
Beroe Stara Zagora (Bulgaria)	1–2	(Albania) Teuta Durrës	0–1	1–1 (a.e.t.)
Karşıyaka (Turkey)	5–6	(Bulgaria) Etar Veliko Tarnovo	4–1	1–5

=== First leg ===
15 September 1992

Beroe Stara Zagora (Bulgaria)	0–1	(Albania) Teuta Durrës

Beroe Stadium, Stara Zagora

15 September 1992

Karşıyaka (Turkey)	4–1	(Bulgaria) Etar Veliko Tarnovo
Kiremitçi 18'; Fedai 41'; Umut 53'; Akçura 73'		Zvetanov 65'

Alsancak Stadium, İzmir

=== Second leg ===
29 September 1992

Teuta Durrës (Albania)	1–1 (a.e.t.)	(Bulgaria) Beroe Stara Zagora

Niko Dovana Stadium, Durrës

Teuta Durrës won 2–1 on aggregate.

29 September 1992

Etar Veliko Tarnovo (Bulgaria)	5–1	(Turkey) Karşıyaka
Dimov 5'; Spasov 7'; Yordanov 27'; Kefalov 43'; Popivanov 67'		Dirik 41'

Stadion Ivaylo, Veliko Tarnovo

Etar Veliko Tarnovo won 6–5 on aggregate.

== Semi-finals ==
Team 1	Agg.	Team 2	1st leg	2nd leg
Etar Veliko Tarnovo (Bulgaria)	2–1	(Romania) Dacia Unirea Brăila	2–1	0–0
Teuta Durrës (Albania)	2–2 (3–5 p)	(Greece) Edessaikos	2–0	0–2 (a.e.t.)

=== First leg ===
20 October 1992

Etar Veliko Tarnovo (Bulgaria)	2–1	(Romania) Dacia Unirea Brăila

Stadion Ivaylo, Veliko Tarnovo

20 October 1992

Teuta Durrës (Albania)	2–0	(Greece) Edessaikos

Niko Dovana Stadium, Durrës

=== Second leg ===
3 November 1992

Dacia Unirea Brăila (Romania)	0–0	(Bulgaria) Etar Veliko Tarnovo

Stadionul Municipal, Brăila

Etar Veliko Tarnovo won 2–1 on aggregate.

3 November 1992

Edessaikos (Greece)	2–0 (a.e.t.)	(Albania) Teuta Durrës
Penalties
	5–3

Municipal Stadium of Edessa, Edessa

Edessaikos won 5–3 on penalties.

== Finals ==
Team 1	Agg.	Team 2	1st leg	2nd leg
Etar Veliko Tarnovo (Bulgaria)	2–3	(Greece) Edessaikos	1–0	1–3

=== First leg ===
31 March 1993

Etar Veliko Tarnovo (Bulgaria)	1–0	(Greece) Edessaikos
Dimov 88'	Report

Ivaylo Stadium, Veliko Tarnovo

=== Second leg ===
21 April 1993

Edessaikos (Greece)	3–1	(Bulgaria) Etar Veliko Tarnovo
Stafylidis 18'; Tsoleridis 65' (pen.), 87'	Report	Stoyanov 17'

Municipal Stadium of Edessa, Edessa

Edessaikos won 3–2 on aggregate.
