= 1976 Balkans Cup =

Tournament details
- Country: Balkans
- Teams: 6

Final positions
- Champions: (Socialist Federal Republic of Yugoslavia) Dinamo Zagreb
- Runners-up: (Romania) Sportul Studențesc

Tournament statistics
- Matches played: 14
- Goals scored: 49 (3.5 per match)

The 1976 Balkans Cup was an edition of the Balkans Cup, a football competition for representative clubs from the Balkan states. It was contested by 6 teams and Dinamo Zagreb won the trophy.

== Group Stage ==
=== Group A ===
Pos	Team	Pld	W	D	L	GF	GA	GR	Pts	Qualification
1	(Romania) Sportul Studențesc (A)	4	2	1	1	12	6	2.000	5	Advances to finals
2	(Bulgaria) Akademik Sofia	4	2	1	1	6	4	1.500	5	
3	(Turkey) Adanaspor	4	0	2	2	3	11	0.273	2	

Source: rsssf.com
Rules for classification: 1) points; 2) goal average; 3) number of goals scored
(A) Advance to a further round
17 March 1976

Adanaspor (Turkey)	1–1	(Bulgaria) Akademik Sofia
Ertuğrul Atilla 27'		Simov 26'

Adana 5 Ocak, Adana

14 April 1976

Akademik Sofia (Bulgaria)	4–2	(Romania) Sportul Studențesc

Akademik, Sofia

21 April 1976

Akademik Sofia (Bulgaria)	1–0	(Turkey) Adanaspor
Ivanov 69'

Akademik, Sofia

9 May 1976

Adanaspor (Turkey)	2–2	(Romania) Sportul Studențesc
Mesci 3'; Mehmet Akpınar 86'		Sandu 30'; Kassai 79'

Adana 5 Ocak, Adana

3 June 1976

Sportul Studențesc (Romania)	7–0	(Turkey) Adanaspor
Rădulescu 40'; Grosu 47', 50', 60'; Ionescu 58', 79'; Marica 73'

Regie, Bucharest

11 August 1976

Sportul Studențesc (Romania)	1–0	(Bulgaria) Akademik Sofia

Regie, Bucharest

=== Group B ===
Pos	Team	Pld	W	D	L	GF	GA	GR	Pts	Qualification
1	(Socialist Federal Republic of Yugoslavia) Dinamo Zagreb (A)	4	3	0	1	6	4	1.500	6	Advances to finals
2	(Albania) Dinamo Tirana	4	2	0	2	8	7	1.143	4	
3	(Greece) Ethnikos Piraeus	4	1	0	3	5	8	0.625	2	

Source: rsssf.com
Rules for classification: 1) points; 2) goal average; 3) number of goals scored
(A) Advance to a further round
17 March 1976

Ethnikos Piraeus (Greece)	1–0	(Socialist Federal Republic of Yugoslavia) Dinamo Zagreb
Ch. Stamatakis 20'

Karaiskakis Stadium, Piraeus

31 March 1976

Dinamo Tirana (Albania)	1–2	(Socialist Federal Republic of Yugoslavia) Dinamo Zagreb
Përnaska 35'		Zajec; Bogdan

Dinamo Stadium, Tirana

14 April 1976

Dinamo Tirana (Albania)	2–0	(Greece) Ethnikos Piraeus
Dibra 4'; Zëri 29'

Dinamo Stadium, Tirana

26 May 1976

Ethnikos Piraeus (Greece)	3–4	(Albania) Dinamo Tirana
Karaiszkosz 31'; Lamprinos 43'; Koureas 79'		Ballgjini 42'; Zëri 49', 72'; Përnaska 54'

Karaiskakis Stadium, Piraeus

28 April 1976

Dinamo Zagreb (Socialist Federal Republic of Yugoslavia)	2–1	(Greece) Ethnikos Piraeus
Kranjčar; Bonić		Kritikos

Stadion Maksimir, Zagreb

12 May 1976

Dinamo Zagreb (Socialist Federal Republic of Yugoslavia)	2–1	(Albania) Dinamo Tirana
Kranjčar; Bonić		Përnaska

Stadion Maksimir, Zagreb

== Finals ==
Team 1	Agg.	Team 2	1st leg	2nd leg
Dinamo Zagreb (Socialist Federal Republic of Yugoslavia)	5–4	(Romania) Sportul Studențesc	3–1	2–3

=== First leg ===
1 June 1977

Dinamo Zagreb (Socialist Federal Republic of Yugoslavia)	3–1	(Romania) Sportul Studențesc
Kranjčar 11'; Cerin 22' 52'	Report	Cazan 84'

Maksimir, Zagreb
Attendance: 10,000

=== Second leg ===
15 June 1977

Sportul Studențesc (Romania)	3–2	(Socialist Federal Republic of Yugoslavia) Dinamo Zagreb
Munteanu 20'; Sandu 35'; Chihaia 84'	Report	Bonić 55'; Cerin 75'

Regie, Bucharest
Attendance: 3,000

Dinamo Zagreb won 5–4 on aggregate.
