= Angelo Niculescu =

Romanian footballer and manager

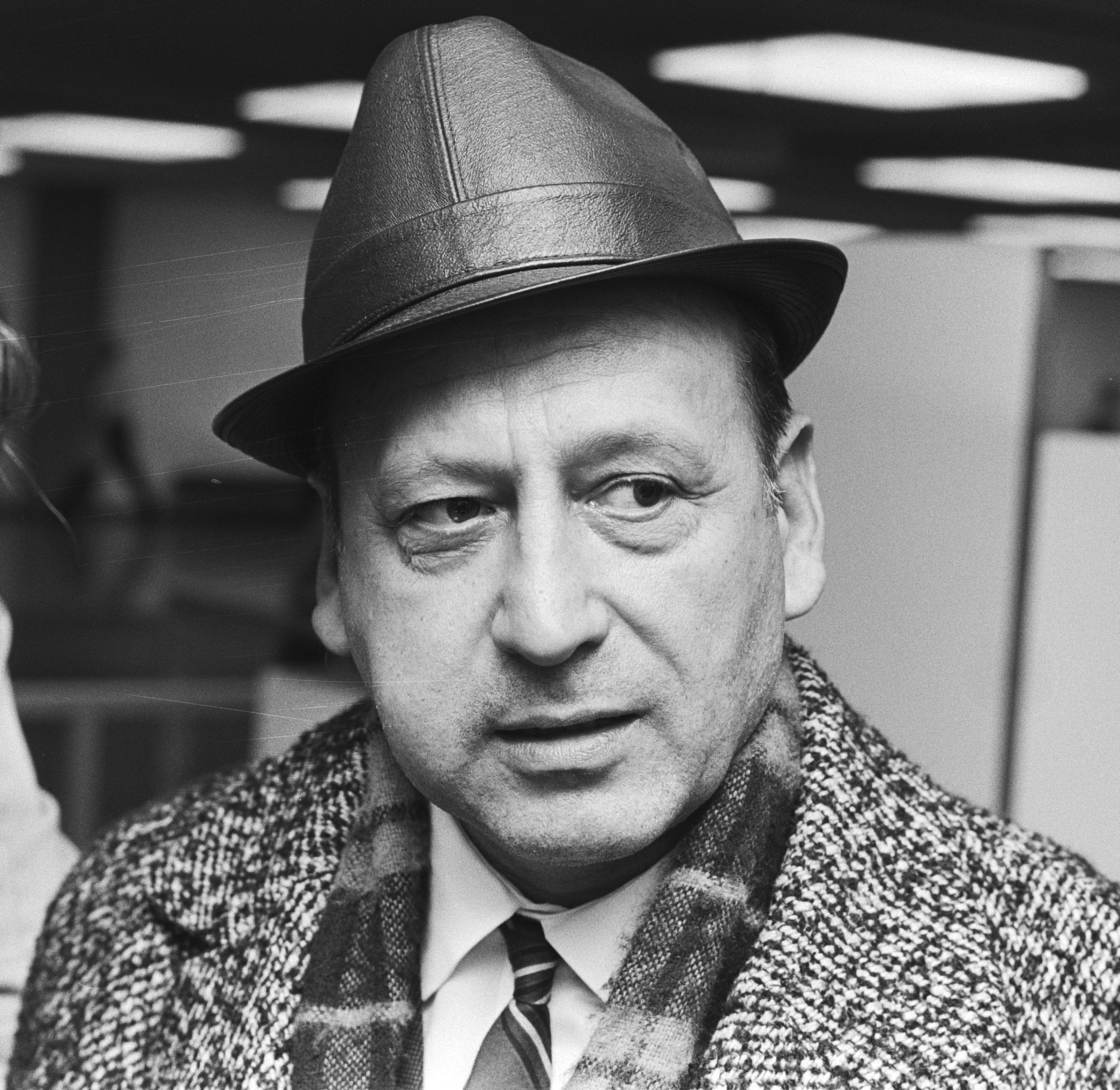
- Niculescu in Amsterdam (1970)

Personal information
- Full name: Angelo Niculescu
- Date of birth: 1 October 1921
- Place of birth: Craiova, Romania
- Date of death: 20 June 2015 (aged 93)
- Place of death: Bucharest, Romania
- Position: Midfielder

Senior career*
Years	Team	Apps	(Gls)
1937–1939	Rovine Grivița Craiova		
1939–1944	FC Craiova		
1945–1947	Carmen București		
1947–1948	Ciocanul București	29	(1)
1948–1950	Dinamo București (Note: Only the statistics for the 1950 Divizia A season are available.)	17	(0)
Total		46	(1)

Managerial career
- 1952: Dinamo București (juniors)
- 1953–1957: Dinamo București
- 1958: Steaua București
- 1958–1959: Tractorul Brașov
- 1964–1966: Dinamo București
- 1967–1972: Romania
- 1973–1977: Sportul Studențesc București
- 1977–1979: Politehnica Timișoara
- 1979–1980: Dinamo București
- 1980–1981: SC Bacău
- 1981–1983: Universitatea Cluj
- 1983–1984: Oțelul Galați
- 1991–1992: Club Africain (technical director)
- * Club domestic league appearances and goals

Angelo Niculescu (1 October 1921 – 20 June 2015) was a Romanian football player and manager. He is best remembered in Romania for being the national team's coach during the 1970 World Cup. Niculescu is also credited with inventing the "temporizare" ("delaying") tactics. This strategy involved the team maintaining possession of the ball within its own half, with players exchanging numerous short passes across the field. The goal was to disrupt opponents' patience and force them to press high. This approach is often considered an early form of tiki-taka. Using these tactics, Niculescu qualified Romania for a World Cup after more than 30 years of absence, and secured a notable win against Czechoslovakia.

== Playing career ==
Niculescu was born on 1 October 1921 in Craiova, Romania and began playing football in 1937 at age 15 in Divizia B at local club Rovine Grivița. In 1939 he moved to play for neighboring team, FC Craiova with whom he won the 1942–43 championship which was not recognized by the Romanian Football Federation because the teams from Transylvania were unable to participate as the territory was annexed to Hungary due to the Second Vienna Award. During World War II his career was interrupted for a while as he was called by the Romanian Army to fight on the Eastern Front. In 1945, Niculescu joined Carmen București where he stayed two years. Subsequently, he moved to Ciocanul București which after one year merged with Carmen to create Dinamo București. He played here until ending his career at age 29, having amassed a total of 93 Divizia A appearances with three goals.

== Managerial career ==
"He was an innovator of football. A fair guy, severe enough, a man of justice. The most important thing was that he formed people. Valuable people of Romanian football."

— Mircea Sandu, former Sportul Studențesc București player talking about Angelo Niculescu

=== First and second spell at Dinamo ===
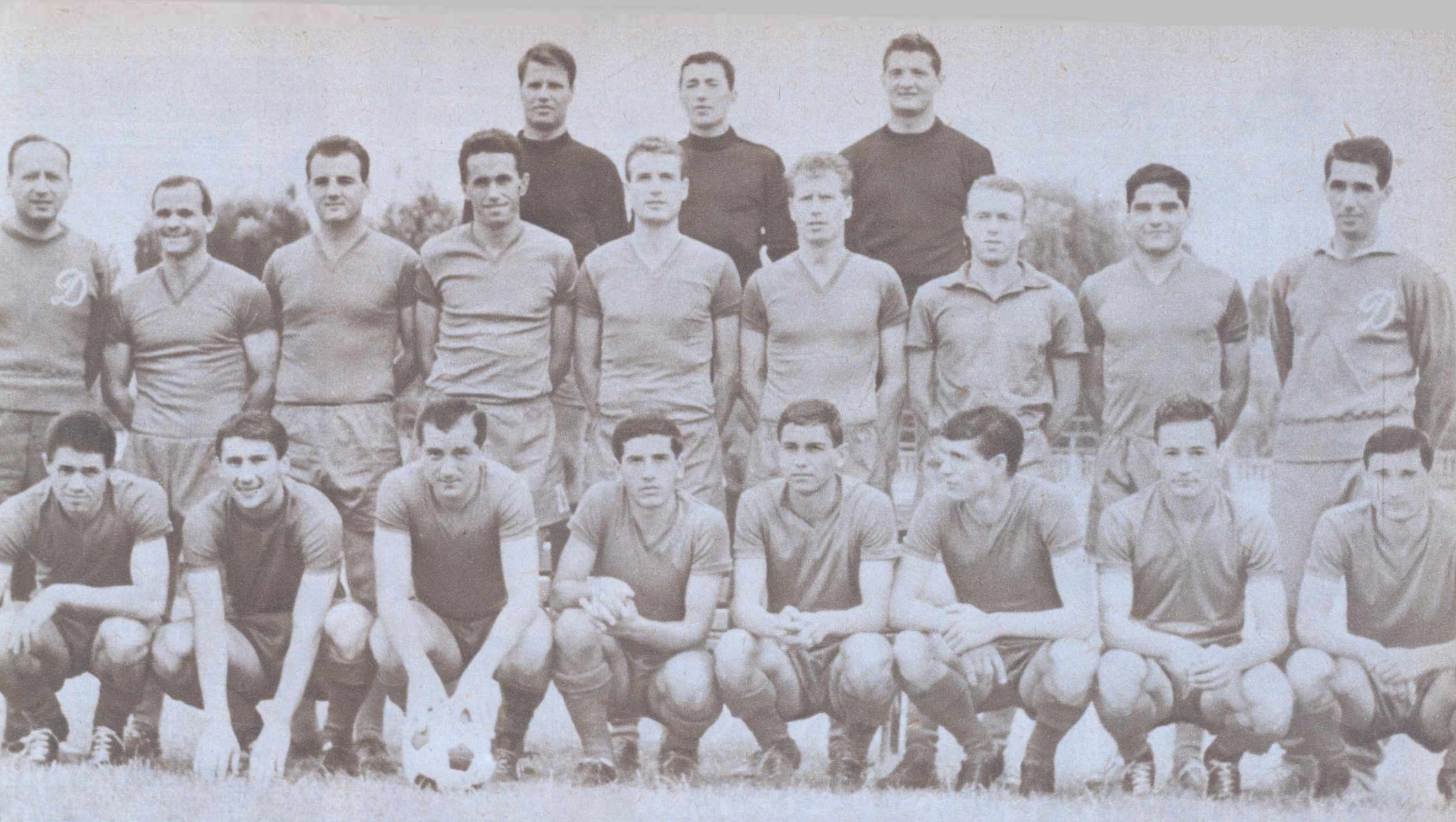
Niculescu (second row, first from left) with Dinamo București in the 1964–65 season

Niculescu started coaching in 1952 at Dinamo București's junior center. One year later, he became the head coach of the senior squad, helping them reach the 1954 Cupa României final which was lost 2–0 to Metalul Reșița. Afterwards, he led Dinamo to win its first Divizia A title in 1955. He guided the team in the first European match of a Romanian team in the 1956–57 European Cup in the 3–1 victory against Galatasaray, helping Dinamo reach the next phase of the competition where they were eliminated by CDNA Sofia. Niculescu left Dinamo in 1957 and had two short experiences at Steaua București and Tractorul Brașov. Subsequently, he returned to Dinamo in 1964, helping the club win another Divizia A title in the 1964–65 season. During the 1965–66 season, Niculescu co-coached the team alongside Traian Ionescu. He has a total of 16 matches in European competitions with The Red Dogs, resulting in 10 victories and 6 losses. One of his most important European victories was the historical 2–1 over Helenio Herrera's Inter Milan in the 1965–66 European Cup edition, the Italians being the winners of the previous two seasons of the competition. Niculescu said after the game:"I am happy that Herrera's "concrete" was broken by the movement on the field of our players. With fair refereeing we would have won even more clearly". However, they lost the second leg with 2–0.

=== Romania national team ===
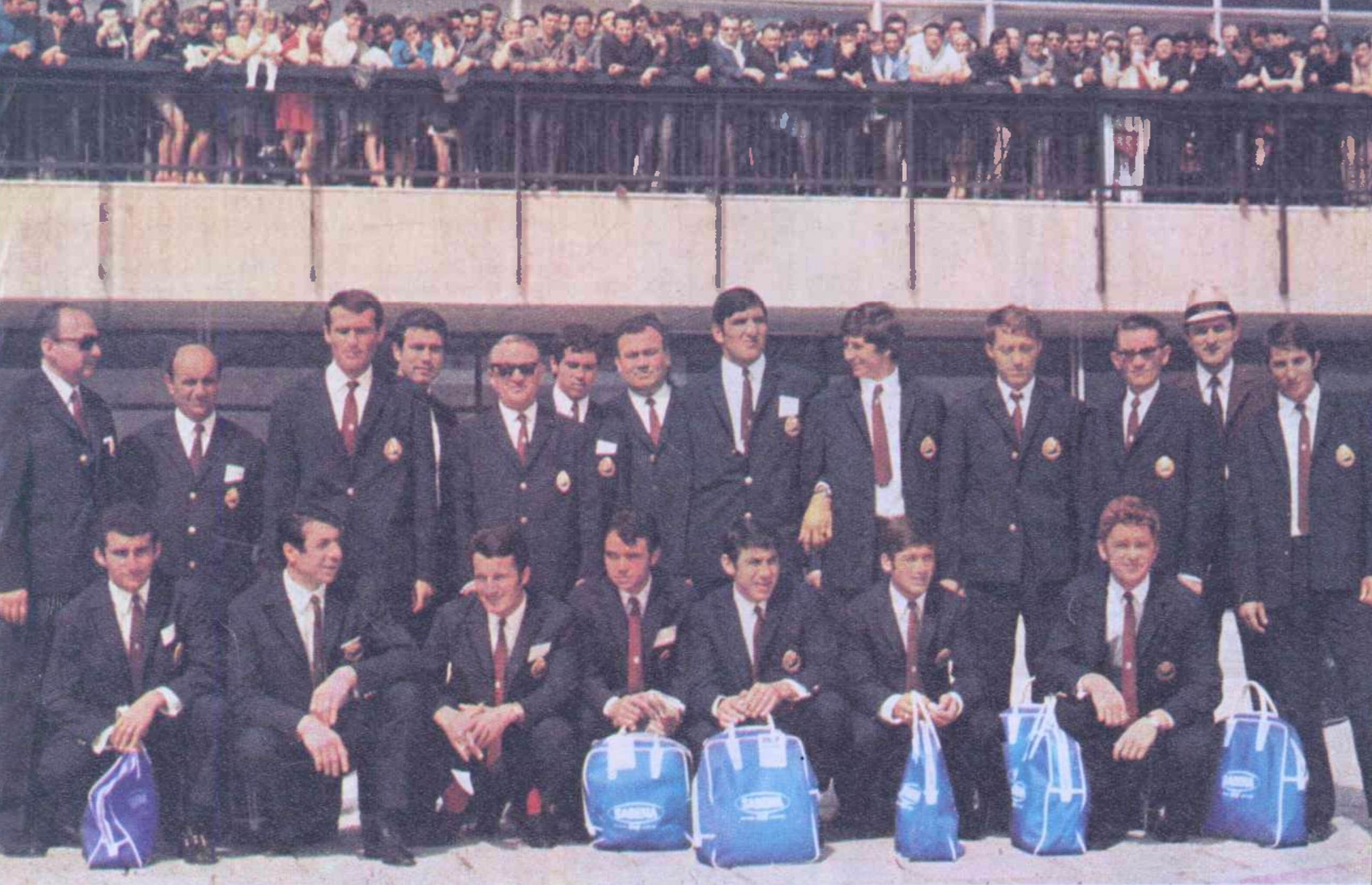
Niculescu (back row, first from the left) with Romania's team at Otopeni airport, before their flight to Mexico in 1970.

Niculescu was named coach of Romania's national team in 1967, making his debut in a 1–0 home loss to Italy in the Euro 1968 qualifiers. He guided the national team through the successful 1970 World Cup qualifiers where they earned first place in a group composed of Greece, Switzerland and Portugal. Thus they qualified for the final tournament after a 32-year absence. There, they earned a 2–1 victory against Czechoslovakia, but lost with 1–0 to title holders England and with 3–2 to the eventual winners of the Mexican tournament Brazil. He was heavily criticized because he did not use Nicolae Dobrin in any games during the final tournament, and while the reasons Niculescu didn't use him are unclear, Dobrin's absence is considered one of the most controversial moments in the history of Romanian football. He also guided the national team during the 1972 Euro qualifiers where they earned first place in a group with Czechoslovakia, Wales and Finland, thereby reaching the quarter-finals. There, Romania was defeated by Hungary, who advanced to the final tournament. His last game as Romania's manager took place on 29 October 1972 in a 2–0 home victory against Albania in the 1974 World Cup qualifiers, totaling 38 matches consisting of 12 victories, 17 draws and 9 losses.

=== Sportul Studențesc and Politehnica Timișoara ===
In 1973, Niculescu took charge of Sportul Studențesc București, remaining at the club until 1977. During this time, he led the team to the 1976 Balkans Cup final, where they were defeated 4–3 on aggregate by Dinamo Zagreb. He also guided them past Olympiacos in the first round of the 1976–77 UEFA Cup before being eliminated by Schalke 04 in the second round. Afterwards, from 1977 to 1979, Niculescu worked for Politehnica Timișoara. There, during the 1977–78 season, he nearly claimed the championship while leading with three matches to spare; however, a 4–2 loss to Dinamo ultimately dropped them to third place, three points behind champions Steaua. Subsequently, he helped them get past MTK Hungária in the first round of the 1978–79 UEFA Cup, but they were defeated in the following round by Budapest Honvéd.

=== Third spell at Dinamo, SC Bacău, U Cluj and Oțelul ===
From 1979 until 1980, Niculescu had a third spell at Dinamo, then he coached SC Bacău for one season. Afterwards, he moved to Universitatea Cluj for two seasons where in the first one, the team was relegated to Divizia B. Niculescu ended his coaching career in 1984 after one season spent at Oțelul Galați, having a total of 445 Divizia A matches, consisting of 196 victories, 101 draws and 148 losses.

=== Club Africain ===
After the 1989 Romanian Revolution, Niculescu went to work as technical director in Tunisia at Club Africain, bringing Ilie Balaci as head coach. In their single season at the club, they won the CAF Champions League, Tunisian League and the Tunisian Cup.

=== Innovative tactic ===
Niculescu is known in Romania for inventing the "temporizare" ("delaying") tactics. This strategy involved the team maintaining possession of the ball within its own half, with players exchanging numerous short passes across the field. The goal was to disrupt opponents' patience and force them to press high. This approach is often considered an early form of tiki-taka. Using these tactics, Niculescu qualified Romania for a World Cup after more than 30 years and secured a notable win against Czechoslovakia. In 2011 FIFA named Niculescu the inventor of the tiki-taka style of play and so did UEFA in 2014.

== Writing ==
Niculescu started writing chronicles, comments and match analysis in 1958 as a journalist for the "Sportul popular" newspaper. He also wrote two volumes about football:

- Fotbal. Metode si mijloace de antrenament (Football. Training methods and means) - co-written with Ion V. Ionescu (1972)
- Corabia cu 11 pasageri (The ship with 11 passengers) (1974)

== Personal life and death ==
He had four brothers and one of them, Jean, was a footballer at Olympia București. For representing his country at the 1970 World Cup, Niculescu was decorated by the President of Romania, Traian Băsescu, on 25 March 2008, with the Class III Sports Merit Order (Ordinul "Meritul Sportiv").

Niculescu died on 20 June 2015 in his apartment in Bucharest and was buried in the Ghencea Military Cemetery. The president of FIFA, Joseph Blatter said: "Please accept my condolences for the passing of former player and coach Angelo Niculescu. He will be remembered for his contribution to Romanian football, especially as the inventor of the tiki-taka style of play."

== Honours ==
=== Manager ===
Dinamo București

- Divizia A: 1955, 1964–65
- Cupa României runner-up: 1954

Sportul Studențesc București

- Balkans Cup runner-up: 1976
