= Mario Bonić =

Croatian footballer

Personal information
- Date of birth: 4 August 1952 (age 74)
- Place of birth: Dubrovnik, FPR Yugoslavia
- Position: Forward

Youth career
- Dubrovnik

Senior career*
Years	Team	Apps	(Gls)
–1973	Dubrovnik		
1973–1980	Dinamo Zagreb	139	(31)
1980–1982	Apollon Athens	58	(16)
1982–1983	Panachaiki	23	(6)
1983–1984	Austria Salzburg	6	(0)

International career
1974	Yugoslavia U21	1	(0)

Managerial career
- 1986: GOŠK-Jug
- 1997: Proodeftiki (caretaker)
- 1998: Proodeftiki (caretaker)
- 1999: Ethnikos
- * Club domestic league appearances and goals

Mario Bonić (born 4 August 1952) is a Croatian retired football manager and player who played a forward.
