= Regie Stadium =

Rumanian football stadium

- Sportul Stadium
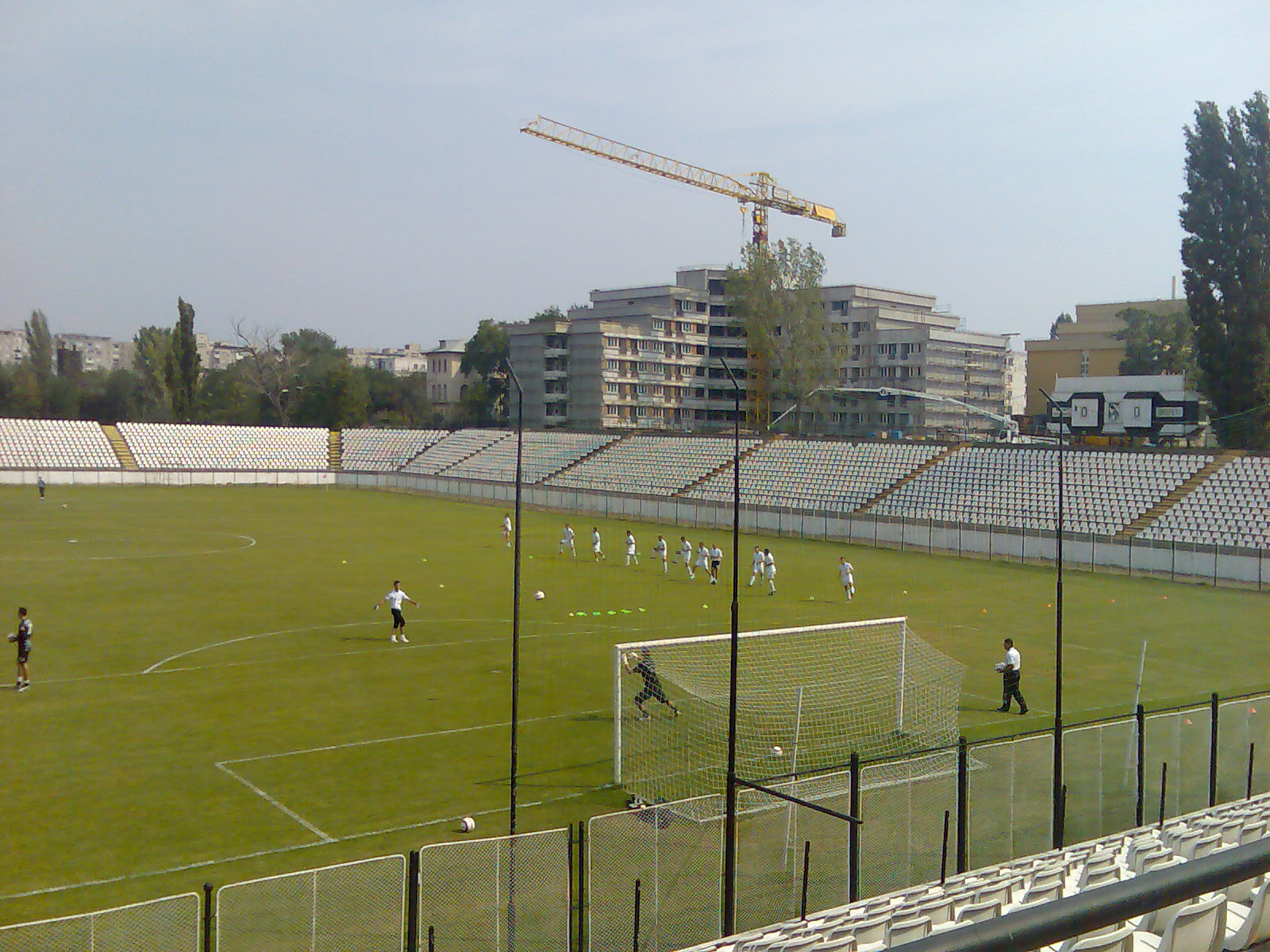
- Interactive map of Regie Stadium
- Former names: Belvedere Stadium (1920s–1950s)
- Address: Str. Nicolae Teodorescu, nr. 40
- Location: Bucharest, Romania
- Coordinates: 44°26′53.7″N 26°03′11.1″E
- Owner: Ministry of National Education
- Capacity: 10,020 seated
- Surface: Grass

Construction
- Built: 1920
- Opened: 1920
- Renovated: 1972, 2004, 2019

Tenants
- Belvedere FC; Sportul Studențesc (1920–2014); Rapid București (2011) (2019–2020); Rapid II București (2020–2021)

The Regie Stadium, also known as Sportul Stadium, is a multi-purpose stadium in Bucharest, Romania. It is used mostly for football matches and was the home ground of Sportul Studențesc București for 94 years. The stadium has 10,020 seats.

== History ==
The stadium was built in the 1920s, and until the Second World War, it belonged to Belvedere FC. During that time, the stadium had only one West stand and also an oval athletic track around the pitch. In 1955, the stadium changed ownership from CAM (Casa Autonomă a Monopulului) to the Ministry of Education. Consequently, the Polytechnic Institute of Bucharest and its football club, Știinta (later Politehnica, and now Sportul Studențesc), was allowed to train and play their home games here.

The stadium was renovated for the first time in 1972 after Sportul Studențesc was promoted to the Romanian First Division. With the help of then TMUCB Director, Mr. Barbu Emil "Mac" Popescu, the athletic track was removed and the North, South, and East stands were built. Soil excavated from the construction of the Bucharest subway system was used to build the aforementioned stands.

In 2004, following FC Sportul Studențesc's latest promotion to the Romanian First Division, the stadium was renovated yet again in order to meet FIFA's latest safety, occupancy, and access requirements. One of the most noticeable aesthetic changes to the stadium was the installation of white plastic seats, thus reducing its capacity from 15,000 to 10,020.

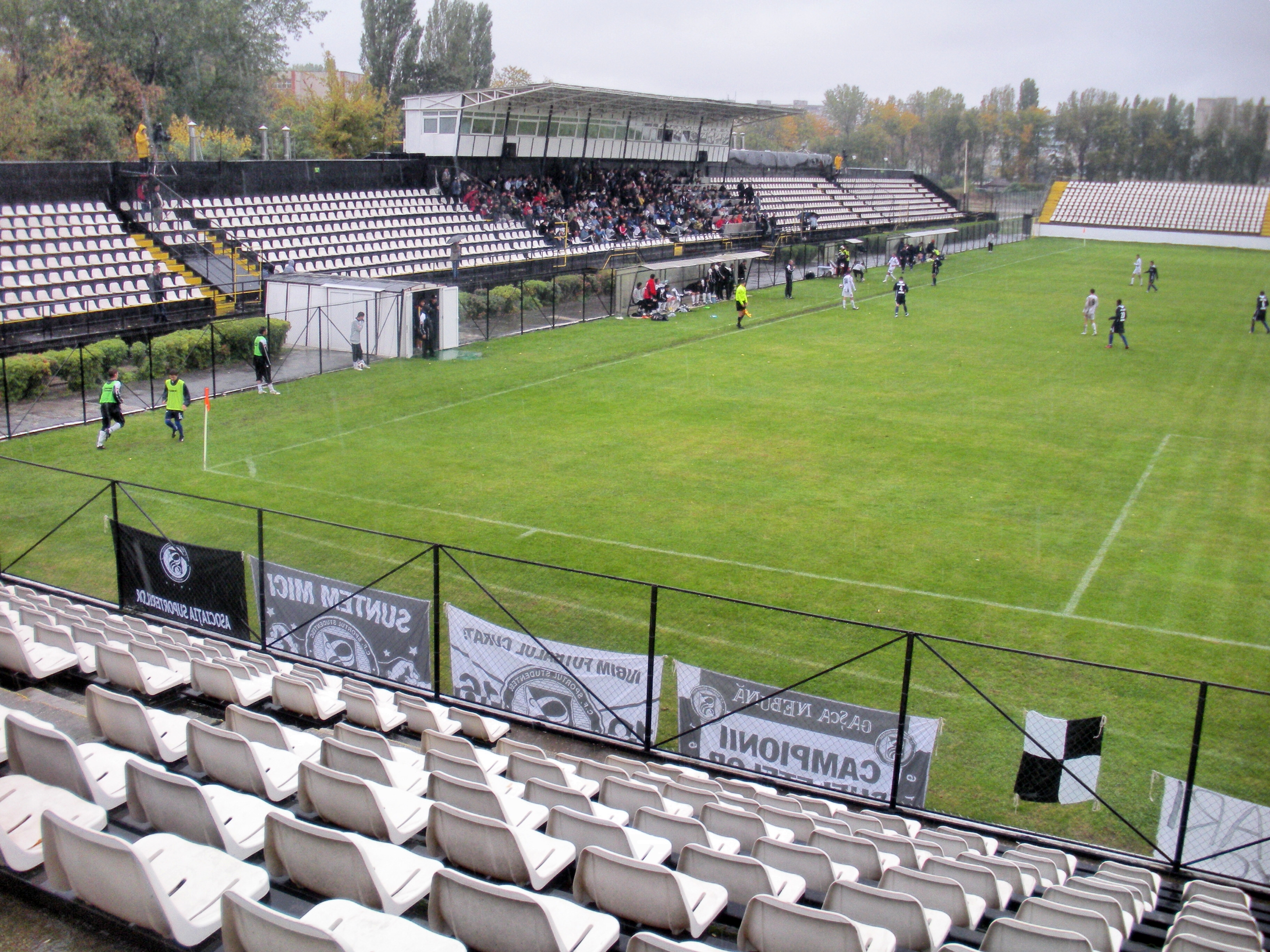
View of the main stand.

== Notable matches ==
Sportul Studențesc - Domestic Championship

- 08.11.2009: Liga II - Sportul Studențesc - Râmnicu Sărat 8-0, Attendance 500 - Largest home win
- 23.09.2006: Liga II - Sportul Studențesc - Prefab Modelu 0-5, Attendance 200 - Largest home defeat in Liga II
- 07.05.2003: Liga I - Sportul Studențesc - Dinamo București 5-6, Attendance 2,000 - Most goals in a home defeat
- 12.03.1997: Liga I - Sportul Studențesc - Dinamo București 0-5, Attendance 7,000 - Largest home defeat in Liga I
- 03.12.1989: Liga I- Sportul Studențesc - Steaua București 0-5 - Largest home defeat in Liga I
- 18.06.1986: Liga I - Sportul Studențesc - Olt Scornicești 7-5 - Most goals in one game

Sportul Studențesc - European Cups

- 09.12.1987: UEFA Cup, 3rd Round, 2nd Leg - Sportul Studențesc - Hellas Verona 0-1(0-0), Attendance 15,000 - Last game in UEFA Cup
- 04.11.1987: UEFA Cup, 2nd Round, 2nd Leg - Sportul Studențesc - Brøndby 3-0(1-0), Attendance 9,600
- 15.09.1987: UEFA Cup, 1st Round, 1st Leg - Sportul Studențesc - GKS Katowice 1-0(0-0), Attendance 13,000
- 22.10.1986: UEFA Cup, 2nd Round, 1st Leg - Sportul Studențesc - KAA Gent 0-3(0-1), Attendance 11,000
- 17.09.1986: UEFA Cup, 1st Round, 1st Leg - Sportul Studențesc - Omonia Nicosia 1-0(0-0), Attendance 10,000
- 03.12.1985: UEFA Cup, 1st Round, 2nd Leg - Sportul Studențesc - Neuchâtel Xamax 4-4(4-2), Attendance 14,000 - First game in UEFA Cup

Romanian Cup Finals

- 30.04.1994: Gloria Bistrita - FC U Craiova 1-0(1-0), Attendance 7,000
- 24.06.1992: Steaua București - Politehnica Timișoara 3-2(1-1,1-1), Attendance 8,000

Romanian Super Cup Finals

- 05.08.1995: Steaua București - Petrolul Ploiesti 2-0(1-0), Attendance 10,000
