= Romulus Chihaia =

Romanian footballer and manager

Personal information
- Date of birth: 4 March 1952 (age 74)
- Place of birth: Galați, Romania
- Height: 1.78 m (5 ft 10 in)
- Position: Midfielder

Youth career
- 1964–1969: Oțelul Galați

Senior career*
| Years | Team | Apps | (Gls) |
| 1969–1971 | Oțelul Galați | 54 | (7) |
| 1971–1972 | FC Galaţi | 23 | (0) |
| 1972–1985 | Sportul Studențesc | 309 | (37) |
| Total | | 386 | (44) |

International career^{‡}
| 1971–1973 | Romania U-21 | 5 | (0) |
| 1973–1975 | Romania U-23 | 2 | (0) |
| 1979–1985 | Romania | 1 | (0) |

Managerial career
- 1990–1991: Sportul Studențesc
- 1994–1995: Sportul Studențesc
- 1998: Sportul Studențesc
- 2007: Naţional București (caretaker)
Medal record
Representing Romania
Universiade
| Gold medal – first place | 1974 Nice | Team |
- * Club domestic league appearances and goals as of 2 May 2016 ‡ National team caps and goals as of 2 May 2016

Romulus Chihaia (born 4 March 1952) is a Romanian former professional footballer and manager. He is the father of Octavian Chihaia. He won the Universiade gold medal with Romania's students football team in the 1974 edition that was held in France, playing alongside László Bölöni, Gheorghe Mulțescu, Dan Păltinișanu and Paul Cazan.
