= Mircea Rădulescu =

Romanian footballer and manager

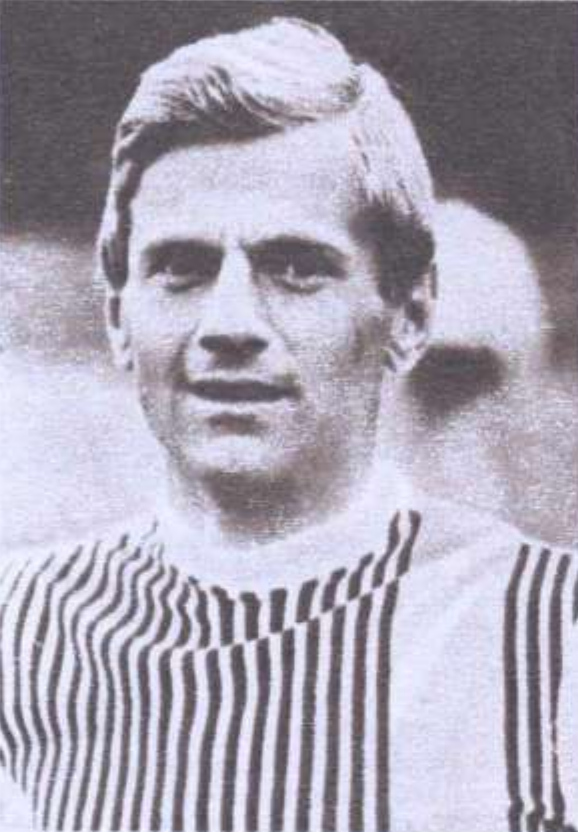
- Rădulescu in 1972

Personal information
- Date of birth: 31 August 1941 (age 85)
- Place of birth: Bucharest, Romania
- Position: Left back

Team information
- Current team: Voluntari (youth center manager)

Youth career
- 1956–1959: Rapid București

Senior career*
Years	Team	Apps	(Gls)
1959–1972	Sportul Studențesc		

Managerial career
- 1972–1977: Sportul Studențesc (youth)
- 1977–1980: Sportul Studențesc
- 1980: Romania U21
- 1981–1984: Romania Olympic (assistant)
- 1981–1986: Romania (assistant)
- 1984: Universitatea Craiova
- 1985–1986: Universitatea Craiova
- 1987: Sportul Studențesc
- 1989–1990: Romania Olympic (assistant)
- 1990–1992: Romania
- 1992–1993: Rapid București
- 1993–1994: Egypt
- 1994–1995: Club Africain
- 1995: Sportul Studențesc
- 1995–1996: Rapid București
- 1997: Universitatea Craiova
- 1997–1998: Syria
- 2000–2001: Algeria
- 2015: Voluntari (caretaker)
- 2018: Voluntari (caretaker)
- * Club domestic league appearances and goals

Mircea Rădulescu (born 31 August 1941 in Bucharest) is a Romanian former football player and manager.

== Playing career ==
Rădulescu, nicknamed "Riciu", was born on 31 August 1941 in Bucharest, Romania. He began playing junior-level football at Rapid București under the guidance of coaches Costea and Urecheatu. At 18, he transitioned to senior-level football at Sportul Studențesc. Over the course of 13 years, he played over 300 matches in Divizia B as a left defender, playing alongside teammates such as Mircea Lucescu and Florin Halagian. In 1972, after leading Sportul Studențesc as captain to achieve promotion to Divizia A at the end of the 1971–72 season, Rădulescu retired.

== Managerial career ==
Rădulescu had his first coaching experience in 1959, leading the women's team of the Institute of Physical Culture. After he ended his playing career, Rădulescu coached at Sportul Studențesc's youth center during the early 1970s. In 1977, he became the head coach of Sportul's main squad and his first achievement was reaching the 1979 Cupa României final, where they were defeated 3–0 by Steaua București. Subsequently, he guided them to win the 1979–80 Balkans Cup after defeating Rijeka 3–1 on aggregate in the final.

In 1980, Rădulescu was the head coach of Romania's under-21 side. From 1981 to 1984, he was an assistant coach for Romania's Olympic team, while also being the assistant to Mircea Lucescu for Romania's main squad between November 1981 and September 1986. During this period, Rădulescu also had two tenures as head coach at Universitatea Craiova. The first one was in 1984 and the second was from 1985 to 1986. In the first stint, Rădulescu helped "U" navigate past Real Betis and Olympiacos in the 1984–85 UEFA Cup run before they ultimately fell to Željezničar in the round of 16. In the second spell, he led Universitatea to a 3–0 win over AS Monaco in the second leg of the first round of the 1985–86 European Cup Winners' Cup, after losing the first leg 2–0. Eventually, they were eliminated in the following round by the eventual winners of the competition, Dynamo Kyiv. Afterwards, in the first leg of the first round of the 1986–87 UEFA Cup, he helped the team earn a 2–1 win over Galatasaray. However, during the match he replaced Sorin Cârțu, who was unsatisfied with the decision, and the fans' immediate support for Cârțu ultimately led Rădulescu to leave the team.

In 1987, Rădulescu worked as head coach of Sportul Studențesc, helping the club get past GKS Katowice in the first round of the 1987–88 UEFA Cup before being dismissed due to poor results in the domestic league. Between 1989 and 1990, he was an assistant coach for Romania's Olympic team. In 1990, Rădulescu became the head coach of Romania's main squad, with his debut taking place on 5 December in a 6–0 victory against San Marino in the Euro 1992 qualifiers. He led the team in six qualifying matches without a single defeat, but they did not qualify for the final tournament due to earning only a draw instead of a victory in the last match against Bulgaria. During his tenure, The Tricolours also earned a 2–0 away win in a friendly against Spain. Rădulescu resigned in February 1992 after Romania lost 1–0 to Greece in a friendly. He led Romania in 12 matches, consisting of five victories, three draws and four losses.

For the 1992–93 season, Rădulescu managed Rapid București. He then became the head coach of Egypt's national team. After about one year, he took the helm of Club Africain. He had his third tenure at Sportul Studențesc in 1995, followed by stints at Rapid București and Universitatea Craiova. In 1997, Rădulescu went to coach Syria's national team for one year. In 2000, he became co-coach of Algeria alongside Abdel Djaadaoui. During this tenure, Algeria played two friendlies against Romania, winning the first one 3–2 and losing the second by the same score.

From 2001 to 2011, Rădulescu was the director of the Romanian National School of Coaches. During this period, on 25 March 2008, Rădulescu was decorated by the president of Romania, Traian Băsescu, with the Class III Sports Merit Order (Ordinul "Meritul Sportiv") for all of his achievements as a football coach and for shaping young generations of future champions. Subsequently, Rădulescu was the director of Voluntari's youth academy. During this tenure, he also had two spells as caretaker manager for the club's senior squad. The first took place between 24 September and 6 October 2015, and the second was for a single match, a 1–1 draw against Dunărea Călărași in October 2018.

== Publishing ==
Rădulescu wrote several books about football, among which are the following:

- Fotbal – lucrări practico-metodice (Football – practical-methodological work) - (1973)
- Fotbal. Exerciții (Football. Exercises) - co-written with I. Voica (1973)
- Fotbal – Aspecte actuale ale pregătirii juniorilor (Football – Current aspects of youth player training) - (1984)
- Ghidul antrenorului de fotbal – copii și juniori (The Football Coach's Guide – Children and Juniors) - co-written with Viorel Cojocaru (2003)
- Fotbal pentru copii și juniori – Culegere de idei și soluții metodice (Football for Children and Juniors – A Collection of Methodological Ideas and Solutions) - co-written with Viorel Cojocaru (2006)
- Fotbal – Tehnica – factor prioritar (Football – Technique – a priority factor) - (2007)
- Fotbal PRO – Probleme ale antrenorului profesionist (Pro Football – Challenges Facing the Professional Coach) - co-written with Marius Dima (2009)

Sports commentator Ilie Dobre wrote a book about him titled Mircea Rădulescu - antrenorul a patru echipe naționale (Mircea Rădulescu - coach of four national teams), which was released in 2000.

== Honours ==
=== Player ===
Sportul Studențesc

- Divizia B: 1971–72

=== Manager ===
Sportul Studențesc

- Balkans Cup: 1979–80
- Cupa României runner-up: 1978–79

== Selected works ==
- Rădulescu, Mircea (2007). Fotbal. Tehnica – factor prioritar. Editura Răzeşu. ISBN 978-973-88108-1-5.
- Rădulescu, Mircea; Dima, Marius (2009). "Fotbal PRO" – Probleme ale antrenorului profesionist. Editura Didactică şi Pedagogică, R.A. ISBN 978-973-30-2610-5.
