= 1979–80 Balkans Cup =

Tournament details
- Country: Balkans
- Teams: 5

Final positions
- Champions: (Romania) Sportul Studențesc
- Runners-up: (Socialist Federal Republic of Yugoslavia) Rijeka

Tournament statistics
- Matches played: 8
- Goals scored: 24 (3 per match)

The 1979–80 Balkans Cup was an edition of the Balkans Cup, a football competition for representative clubs from the Balkan states. It was contested by 5 teams and Sportul Studențesc won the trophy.

== Group Stage ==
=== Group A ===
Pos	Team	Pld	W	D	L	GF	GA	GR	Pts	Qualification
1	(Socialist Federal Republic of Yugoslavia) Rijeka (A)	4	3	0	1	9	6	1.500	6	Advances to finals
2	(Albania) Partizani Tirana	4	2	0	2	6	7	0.857	4	
3	(Greece) PAS Giannina	4	1	0	3	5	7	0.714	2	

Source: rsssf.com
Rules for classification: 1) points; 2) goal average; 3) number of goals scored
(A) Advance to a further round
14 March 1979

Rijeka (Socialist Federal Republic of Yugoslavia)	3–0	(Albania) Partizani Tirana

Stadion Kantrida, Rijeka

28 March 1979

PAS Giannina (Greece)	3–0	(Albania) Partizani Tirana

Zosimades Stadium, Ioannina

18 April 1979

Partizani Tirana (Albania)	4–1	(Socialist Federal Republic of Yugoslavia) Rijeka

Dinamo Stadium, Tirana

16 May 1979

Partizani Tirana (Albania)	2–0	(Greece) PAS Giannina

Dinamo Stadium, Tirana

=== Group B ===
Pos	Team	Pld	W	D	L	GF	GA	GR	Pts	Qualification
1	(Romania) Sportul Studențesc (A)	2	1	0	1	4	3	1.333	2	Advances to finals
2	(Bulgaria) Slavia Sofia	2	1	0	1	3	4	0.750	2	
3	(Turkey) Galatasaray (Note: Galatasaray withdrew from the tournament.)	0	0	0	0	0	0	—	0	

Source: rsssf.com
Rules for classification: 1) points; 2) goal average; 3) number of goals scored
(A) Advance to a further round
Notes:
16 May 1979

Sportul Studențesc (Romania)	2–0	(Bulgaria) Slavia Sofia
Kostov 26' (o.g.); Sandu 74'

Steaua, Bucharest

22 May 1979

Slavia Sofia (Bulgaria)	3–2	(Romania) Sportul Studențesc
Aleksandrov 18'; Kostov 33'; Tsvetkov 75'	Report	Sandu 38'; Rădulescu 89'

Slavia, Sofia

== Finals ==
Team 1	Agg.	Team 2	1st leg	2nd leg
Sportul Studențesc (Romania)	3–1	(Socialist Federal Republic of Yugoslavia) Rijeka	2–0	1–1

=== First leg ===
2 April 1980

Sportul Studențesc (Romania)	2–0	(Socialist Federal Republic of Yugoslavia) Rijeka
Ionescu 34'; Cățoi 50'	Report

Regie, Bucharest
Attendance: 1,500
Referee: Iordan Zhezhov (Bulgaria)

=== Second leg ===
14 May 1980

Rijeka (Socialist Federal Republic of Yugoslavia)	1–1	(Romania) Sportul Studențesc
Tomić 33'	Report	Sandu 66'

Kantrida, Rijeka
Attendance: 1,000
Referee: Shefqet Caslli (Albania)

Sportul Studențesc won 3–1 on aggregate.
