= 1978–79 Cupa României =

Tournament details
- Country: Romania

Final positions
- Champions: Steaua București
- Runners-up: Sportul Studenţesc București

The 1978–79 Cupa României was the 41st edition of Romania's most prestigious football cup competition.

The title was won by Steaua București against Sportul Studenţesc București.

== Format ==
The competition is an annual knockout tournament.

First round proper matches are played on the ground of the lowest ranked team, then from the second round proper the matches are played on a neutral location.

In the first round proper, if a match is drawn after 90 minutes, the game goes in extra time, if the scored is still tight after 120 minutes, the team who played away will qualify, if the teams are from the same league, then the winner will be established at penalty kicks.

From the second round proper, if a match is drawn after 90 minutes, the game goes in extra time, if the scored is still tight after 120 minutes, then the winner will be established at penalty kicks.

From the first edition, the teams from Divizia A entered in competition in sixteen finals, rule which remained till today.

== First round proper ==
Team 1	Score	Team 2
28 February 1979
Steagul Roşu Braşov (Div. B)	1–0	(Div. A) UTA Arad
Metalul București (Div. B)	3–1 (a.e.t.)	(Div. A) Corvinul Hunedoara
Victoria Carei (Div. C)	0–1	(Div. A) Sportul Studenţesc București
Muscelul Câmpulung (Div. B)	1–2	(Div. A) Dinamo București
Universitatea Cluj (Div. B)	2–2 (a.e.t.)	(Div. A) SC Bacău
FC Constanţa (Div. B)	0–0 (a.e.t.)	(Div. A) Steaua București
FCM Galaţi (Div. B)	2–0 (a.e.t.)	(Div. A) Bihor Oradea
Minerul Ghelar (Div. C)	0–2	(Div. A) Argeş Piteşti
Energia Oneşti (Div. C)	0–0 (a.e.t.)	(Div. A) Politehnica Timişoara
Constructorul Iaşi (Div. B)	2–2 (a.e.t.)	(Div. A) Jiul Petroşani
Laminorul Nădrag (Div. C)	0–5	(Div. A) Universitatea Craiova
Chimia Brazi (Div. B)	2–0	(Div. A) FC Baia Mare
Gloria Buzău (Div. A)	1–0	(Div. A) ASA 1962 Târgu Mureș
Politehnica Iași (Div. A)	5–0	(Div. A) Olimpia Satu Mare
Dinamo Slatina (Div. B)	1–0	(Div. A) Chimia Râmnicu Vâlcea
Sticla Arieșul Turda (Div. C)	1–0 (a.e.t.)	(Div. A) CS Târgovişte

== Second round proper ==
Team 1	Score	Team 2
16 May 1979
Sticla Arieșul Turda	1–3	Gloria Buzău
Steaua București	4–1	Metalul București
FCM Galaţi	2–1	Jiul Petroşani
Politehnica Timişoara	2–0	SC Bacău
Steagul Roşu Braşov	2–1	Dinamo Slatina
Politehnica Iași	3–5 (a.e.t.)	Dinamo București
Chimia Brazi	1–4	Universitatea Craiova
3 June 1979
Argeş Piteşti	0–0 (a.e.t.)(3–4 p)	Sportul Studenţesc București

== Quarter-finals ==
Team 1	Score	Team 2
13 June 1979
Sportul Studenţesc București	4–0	Gloria Buzău
FCM Galaţi	1–3	Dinamo București
Steaua București	3–1	Politehnica Timişoara
Steagul Roşu Braşov	0–0 (a.e.t.)(4-3 p)	Universitatea Craiova

== Semi-finals ==
Team 1	Score	Team 2
27 June 1979
Sportul Studenţesc București	1–0	Dinamo București
Steagul Roşu Braşov	1–2 (a.e.t.)	Steaua București

== Final ==
1 July 1979
17:00 EET

Steaua București	3–0	Sportul Studențesc București
Dumitru 24'; Răducanu 31', 78'	Report

23 August, Bucharest
Attendance: 50,000
Referee: Nicolae Rainea (Bârlad)
