= FC Sportul Studențesc București =

ACSS Sportul Studențesc București
- Full name: Asociația Clubul Sportiv al Suporterilor Sportul Studențesc București
- Nicknames: Gașca nebună (The Crazy Gang); Studenții (The Students); Trupa din Regie (The Regie Squad)
- Short name: Sportul
- Founded: 11 February 1916; 110 years ago as Sporting Club Universitar Studențesc; 2026 (refounded)
- Ground: Complexul Sportiv Tei, Bucharest
- Manager: Tiberiu Bălan
- League: Liga V

Sportul Studențesc, commonly referred to as Sportul, is the name associated with a historic Romanian football club and, since 2026, a supporters-led senior football project based in Bucharest. The original club was founded on 11 February 1916 by a group of university professors and students led by mathematician Traian Lalescu. After the senior team withdrew from competition in 2017, a new project organised by the Asociația Clubul Sportiv al Suporterilor Sportul Studențesc București announced the return of a senior side in 2026, entering the Bucharest division of Liga V.

The club's best European performance came in the 1979–80 Balkans Cup, when it won the trophy by defeating Yugoslav side Rijeka in the final. Sportul also reached the 1976 Balkans Cup final, where it lost to Dinamo Zagreb. In the UEFA Cup, its best performance came in the 1987–88 season, when the club reached the third round.

Domestically, Sportul Studențesc's best league performance was a second-place finish in the 1985–86 season, behind Steaua București. In the Cupa României, Sportul reached the final on three occasions, in 1938–39, 1942–43 and 1978–79, losing to Rapid București, CFR Turnu Severin and Steaua București, respectively.

The traditional home of Sportul Studențesc is Regie Stadium in Bucharest. The senior team launched in 2026, however, plays its home matches at Complexul Sportiv Tei.

== Chronology of names ==
Period	Name
1916–1919	Sporting Club Universitar București
1919–1946	Sportul Studențesc București
1946–1948	Sparta București
1948–1954	Clubul Sportiv Universitar București
1954–1966	Știința București
1966–1969	Politehnica București
1969–2017	Sportul Studențesc București
2017–2026	No senior team in league competition
2026–	ACS al Suporterilor Sportul Studențesc (supporters-led senior project)

== History ==
Chart of Sportul Studențesc's yearly league positions.

On 11 February 1916, Sporting Club Universitar Studențesc was founded on the initiative of a group of professors and students. Football, athletics and tennis were initially the club's three sporting sections. Its first president was professor Traian Lalescu, the mathematician who played an important role in the development of Romanian higher education.

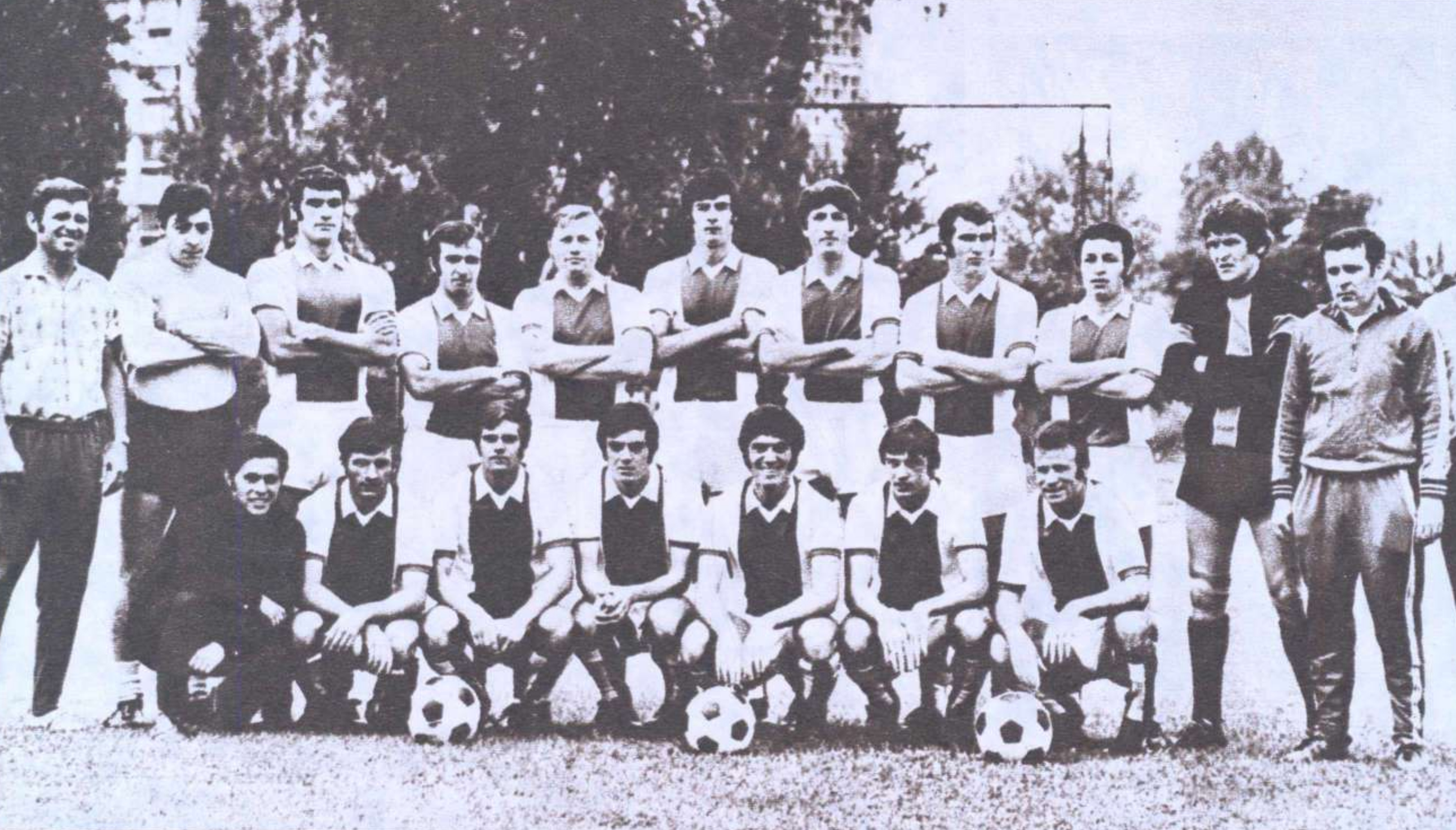
The Sportul squad that won the 1971–72 Divizia B season and earned promotion to Divizia A

The club initially had no stadium of its own and played its matches at several grounds in Bucharest. It was later allowed to use the Belvedere ground in the Regie district, which became closely associated with the club.

The history of Sportul Studențesc can be divided into several distinct periods. Before the Second World War, the club established itself in the Romanian national competitions. Following several reorganisations during the early communist period, it eventually returned to its traditional Sportul Studențesc name in 1969.

The mid-to-late 1970s and the 1980s represented the club's most successful period. Led by president Barbu Emil "Mac" Popescu, Sportul reached two Balkans Cup finals, winning the competition once, qualified for the UEFA Cup on six occasions and reached a Cupa României final. The club recorded its highest league finish in the 1985–86 season, when it finished second. Players associated with Sportul during this period included Marcel Coraș, Mircea Sandu, Gino Iorgulescu and Gheorghe Hagi.

After the fall of communism in 1989, the club encountered increasing financial difficulties and regularly lost some of its most talented players. At the end of the 1997–98 season, Sportul was relegated to the second division after more than 25 consecutive years in the top flight.

One year later, Sportul came close to being relegated to the third tier. With financial support from young investor Vasile Șiman and a major rejuvenation of the squad, the team recovered and remained in the second division.

At the end of the 2000–01 season, Sportul earned promotion to the top flight. After a close battle with Farul Constanța, the club finished first with 81 points and a goal difference of 71–17. The stay in the first division lasted only one season, as Sportul was relegated again at the end of the 2001–02 season.

Sportul returned to the first division after winning its second-tier series in 2003–04. In the following season, the club finished seventh, while Gigel Bucur became the league's top scorer with 21 goals.

During the 2005–06 season, coached by Dan Petrescu during the first part of the campaign and Gheorghe Mulțescu during the second, Sportul finished fourth, its best league placing since the late 1980s. Despite its sporting performance, the club was subsequently relegated to the second tier after failing to obtain a top-flight licence.

After four seasons in Liga II, Sportul earned promotion again at the end of the 2009–10 season. The club finished last in the 2010–11 season, but remained in the top division because of licensing problems involving other clubs. At the end of the 2011–12 season, Sportul finished 17th and was relegated.

Following relegation, Sportul competed in the 2012–13 Liga II season before financial problems pushed the senior side into the Bucharest regional leagues. In the 2016–17 season, Sportul finished fifth in Liga IV Bucharest. The senior team then withdrew before the start of the following campaign and ceased participating in league competition in 2017.

=== 2026 relaunch ===
In 2026, the Asociația Clubul Sportiv al Suporterilor Sportul Studențesc București launched the project Iubește Sportul! with the aim of returning a senior team bearing the Sportul Studențesc name to competition. The supporters' organisation, originally founded in 2006, had changed its structure in 2026 in preparation for operating a football team.

The new senior side was entered in the Bucharest division of Liga V. A formal presentation of the project took place on 3 September 2026. Former Sportul player Tiberiu Bălan was appointed head coach, with Răzvan Patriche as assistant coach. Former goalkeeper Vladimir Niculescu was announced as general manager, Alin Rațiu as sporting manager and Paul Cazan as honorary president.

The team's first Liga V match was scheduled for 6 September 2026 against FC Viitorul Fair Play, with home matches to be played at Complexul Sportiv Tei rather than the traditional Regie Stadium. The project stated that it would be financed through membership fees, donations and sponsorships rather than by a single owner.

The legal and historical continuity between the supporters' project and the former senior club has been publicly disputed. On 4 September 2026, former Sportul owner Vasile Șiman stated that the new Liga V project had no connection with what he regarded as the historic Sportul Studențesc organisation. Șiman claimed that the "real" team remained under his control, announced plans for a separate football project and said that he could take legal action against the supporters' initiative if he considered it necessary.

The Bucharest Municipal Football Association lists the supporters' side in its competitions under the name ACS al Suporterilor Sportul Studențesc.

== Colours and badge ==
The team's traditional colours are black and white, colours historically associated with the university side.

The traditional badge consists of a stylised letter "S" on a black-and-white background, alongside the club's name and year of foundation.

== European record ==
Competition	S	P	W	D	L	GF	GA	GD
UEFA Cup	6	20	6	4	10	20	31	−11
Total	6	20	6	4	10	20	31	−11

Notable wins

Season	Match	Score
UEFA Cup
1976–77	Sportul – (Greece) Olympiacos	3–0
1984–85	Sportul – (Italy) Inter Milan	1–0
1987–88	Sportul – (Denmark) Brøndby	3–0
Balkans Cup
1976	Sportul – (Socialist Federal Republic of Yugoslavia) Dinamo Zagreb	3–2
1979–80	Sportul – (Socialist Federal Republic of Yugoslavia) Rijeka	2–0

== Shirt sponsors and manufacturers ==
Period	Kit manufacturer	Period	Shirt partner
1993–1994		1993–1994	(Romania) Saniplast
1995–1996		1995–1996	(Romania) Fofo
2002–2003		2002–2003	(Romania) Omniasig
2004–2010	(Italy) Lotto
2010–2017 2026-	(Germany) Puma	2010–2011	(Romania) Omniasig
		2011–2014	(Romania) City Insurance

== Honours ==
=== Domestic ===
==== Leagues ====
- Divizia A / Liga I
  - Runners-up (1): 1985–86
- Divizia B / Liga II
  - Winners (4): 1936–37, 1971–72, 2000–01, 2003–04
  - Runners-up (3): 1965–66, 1970–71, 2009–10
- Divizia C / Liga III
  - Winners (1): 1958–59
- Liga IV – Bucharest
  - Runners-up (1): 2014–15

==== Cups ====
- Cupa României
  - Runners-up (3): 1938–39, 1942–43, 1978–79

=== European ===
- Balkans Cup
  - Winners (1): 1979–80
  - Runners-up (1): 1976

== Former managers ==
- (Romania) Ioan Andone
- (Romania) Gabi Balint
- (Romania) Constantin Cernăianu
- (Romania) Ion "Jackie" Ionescu
- (Romania) Traian Ionescu
- (Romania) Marian Mihail
- (Romania) Ion Motroc
- (Romania) Gheorghe Mulțescu
- (Romania) Angelo Niculescu
- (Romania) Gheorghe Ola
- (Romania) Dan Petrescu
- (Romania) Mircea Rădulescu

== Romanian League goalscorer of the year ==
- 1983–84 (Romania) Marcel Coraș
- 1984–85 (Romania) Gheorghe Hagi
- 1985–86 (Romania) Gheorghe Hagi
- 2004–05 (Romania) Gheorghe Bucur
- 2005–06 (Romania) Ionuț Mazilu

== League history ==
Season	Tier	Division	Place	Notes
2026–27	5	Liga V	TBD	Supporters-led senior project
2017–26	No senior team in league competition			
2016–17	4	Liga IV	5th	Senior team withdrew after season
2015–16	4	Liga IV	4th	
2014–15	4	Liga IV	2nd	
2013–14	2	Liga II (Seria I)	Excluded	Excluded before playing
2012–13	2	Liga II (Seria I)	8th	
2011–12	1	Liga I	17th (R)	Relegated
2010–11	1	Liga I	18th	Spared from relegation
2009–10	2	Liga II (Seria I)	2nd (P)	Promoted
2008–09	2	Liga II (Seria I)	10th	
2007–08	2	Liga II (Seria I)	12th	
2006–07	2	Liga II (Seria I)	8th	
2005–06	1	Divizia A	4th (R)	Relegated administratively
2004–05	1	Divizia A	7th	
2003–04	2	Divizia B (Seria II)	1st (C, P)	Promoted
2002–03	1	Divizia A	15th (R)	Relegated
2001–02	1	Divizia A	13th	Won relegation play-off
2000–01	2	Divizia B (Seria I)	1st (C, P)	Promoted
1999–00	2	Divizia B (Seria I)	3rd	
1998–99	2	Divizia B (Seria I)	13th	
1997–98	1	Divizia A	17th (R)	Relegated
1996–97	1	Divizia A	12th	
1995–96	1	Divizia A	14th	
1994–95	1	Divizia A	16th	Won relegation play-off
1993–94	1	Divizia A	16th	
1992–93	1	Divizia A	7th	
1991–92	1	Divizia A	15th	
1990–91	1	Divizia A	12th	
1989–90	1	Divizia A	11th	
1988–89	1	Divizia A	6th	
1987–88	1	Divizia A	14th	
1986–87	1	Divizia A	4th	
1985–86	1	Divizia A	2nd	National runners-up
1984–85	1	Divizia A	3rd	
1983–84	1	Divizia A	4th	
1982–83	1	Divizia A	3rd	
1981–82	1	Divizia A	5th	
1980–81	1	Divizia A	5th	
1979–80	1	Divizia A	6th	

Season	Tier	Division	Place	Notes
1978–79	1	Divizia A	6th	
1977–78	1	Divizia A	4th	
1976–77	1	Divizia A	7th	
1975–76	1	Divizia A	4th	
1974–75	1	Divizia A	4th	
1973–74	1	Divizia A	11th	
1972–73	1	Divizia A	15th	
1971–72	2	Divizia B (Seria I)	1st (C, P)	Promoted
1970–71	2	Divizia B (Seria I)	2nd	
1969–70	2	Divizia B (Seria I)	6th	
1968–69	2	Divizia B (Seria I)	11th	
1967–68	2	Divizia B (Seria I)	7th	
1966–67	2	Divizia B (Seria I)	5th	
1965–66	2	Divizia B (Seria I)	2nd	
1964–65	2	Divizia B (Seria I)	12th	
1963–64	2	Divizia B (Seria I)	8th	
1962–63	2	Divizia B (Seria II)	8th	
1961–62	2	Divizia B (Seria II)	12th	
1960–61	2	Divizia B (Seria II)	3rd	
1959–60	2	Divizia B (Seria I)	5th	
1958–59	3	Divizia C (Seria III)	1st (C, P)	Promoted
1957–58	2	Divizia B (Seria II)	14th (R)	Relegated
1956	2	Divizia B (Seria II)	8th	
1955	2	Divizia B (Seria I)	6th	
1954	—	Regional Championship	2nd (P)	Promoted to Divizia B
1948–53	—	Regional and lower-tier competitions	—	Positions unverified; seasons grouped
1947–48	—	No national league participation	—	Club re-founded in 1948
1946–47	2	Divizia B (Seria II)	12th (R)	Relegated; club dissolved
1944–46	No regular national league competition			
1943–44	—	War Championship	10th	Season abandoned
1942–43	—	War Championship	9th	Unofficial wartime competition
1941–42	—	Cupa Basarabiei	—	Wartime competition
1940–41	1	Divizia A	6th	
1939–40	1	Divizia A	3rd	
1938–39	1	Divizia A	9th	
1937–38	1	Divizia A	5th (Group 2)	
1936–37	2	Divizia B (Seria Est)	1st (C, P)	Promoted
1935–36	2	Divizia B (Seria I)	4th	
1934–35	2	Divizia B (Seria I)	5th	
1916–34	—	Regional and local competitions	—	Positions unverified; seasons grouped
