= Balkans Cup =

Former European football tournament

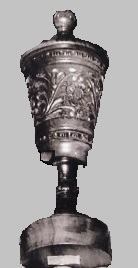
- Balkans Cup trophy in 1968
- Founded: 1961; 65 years ago
- Abolished: 1994; 32 years ago
- Region: Southeast Europe
- Teams: Various
- Related competitions: Balkan Cup
- Last champions: (Turkey) Samsunspor (1st title)
- Most championships: (Bulgaria) Beroe Stara Zagora (4 titles)

The Balkans Cup was an international football competition for clubs from Albania, Bulgaria, Greece, Romania, Turkey, and Yugoslavia. It was introduced in 1961 and was very popular in the 1960s (the 1967 final attracted 42,000 spectators), being the second most important international club competition for clubs from the region (after the European Cup in which the champions could play; the UEFA Cup Winners' Cup originally attracted few teams from the region as many did not organise domestic cups regularly and only Yugoslavia had significant representation in the Fairs Cup).

It later declined after Balkan clubs obtained more representation in the two minor UEFA competitions, in contrast to the (much older but also defunct) Balkan Cup (not Balkans) for national teams.

== Editions ==
Finals on Home and Away basis, except noted otherwise.
a → first leg of the final

Years	Nr of Clubs & Format	Winner (or Champion in Group Format)	Results of Finals (or Points in Group Format)	Finalist (Runner-up)
1960–61; Details	5 Single group	(Romania) Steagul Roşu Braşov	13 – 8 Points RR	(Bulgaria) Levski Sofia
1961–63; Details	8 Two groups	(Greece) Olympiacos	a 1–0 / 0–1 / 1–0; Play-off match in Istanbul, Turkey.	(Bulgaria) Levski Sofia
1963–64; Details	8 Two groups	(Romania) Rapid Bucureşti	2–0 / 1–1 a	(Bulgaria) Spartak Plovdiv
1964–66; Details	8 Two groups	(Romania) Rapid Bucureşti	a 3–3 / 2–0	(Romania) Farul Constanţa
1966–67; Details	8 Two groups	(Turkey) Fenerbahçe	1–0 / 1–2 a / 3–1; Play-off match in Istanbul, Turkey.	(Greece) AEK Athens
1967–68; Details	8 Two groups	(Bulgaria) Beroe Stara Zagora	a 3–0 / 3–4	(Bulgaria) Spartak Sofia
1969; Details	6 Two groups	(Bulgaria) Beroe Stara Zagora	3–0 / 0–1 a 2nd Leg: Dinamo walked off while losing 0–1.	(Albania) Dinamo Tirana
1970; Details	6 Two groups	(Albania) Partizani Tirana	3–0 / 1–1 a 2nd Leg: Beroe did not show up.	(Bulgaria) Beroe Stara Zagora
1971; Details	6 Two groups	(Greece) Panionios	a 2–1 / 1–1	(Albania) Besa Kavajë
1972; Details	6 Two groups	(Bulgaria) Trakia Plovdiv	a 5–0 / 0–4	(Socialist Federal Republic of Yugoslavia) Vardar Skopje
1973; Details	6 Two groups	(Bulgaria) Lokomotiv Sofia	2–0 / 1–1 a	(Romania) ASA Târgu Mureș
1974; Details	6 Two groups	(Bulgaria) Akademik Sofia	a 2–1 / 0–0	(Socialist Federal Republic of Yugoslavia) Vardar Skopje
1975; Details	6 Two groups	(Socialist Federal Republic of Yugoslavia) Radnički Niš	a 1–0 / 2–1	(Turkey) Eskişehirspor
1976; Details	6 Two groups	(Socialist Federal Republic of Yugoslavia) Dinamo Zagreb	a 3–1 / 2–3	(Romania) Sportul Studențesc
1977; Details	6 Two groups	(Greece) Panathinaikos	2–1 / 0–0 a	(Bulgaria) Slavia Sofia
1977–78; Details	6 Two groups	(Socialist Federal Republic of Yugoslavia) NK Rijeka	4–1 / 0–1 a	(Romania) Jiul Petroşani
1979–80; Details	6 Two groups	(Romania) Sportul Studențesc	a 2–0 / 1–1	(Socialist Federal Republic of Yugoslavia) NK Rijeka
1980–81; Details	6 Two groups	(Socialist Federal Republic of Yugoslavia) Velež Mostar	6–2 / 6–5 a	(Bulgaria) Trakia Plovdiv
1981–83; Details	6 Two groups	(Bulgaria) Beroe Stara Zagora	a 3–0 / 3–1	(Albania) 17 Nëntori Tirana
1983–84; Details	3 Round robin	(Bulgaria) Beroe Stara Zagora	6 – 4 Points RR	(Romania) Argeş Piteşti
1984–85; Details	8 Knockout	(Greece) Iraklis	4–1 / 1–3 a	(Romania) Argeş Piteşti
1986; Details	8 Knockout	(Bulgaria) Slavia Sofia	a 3–0 / 2–3	(Greece) Panionios
1987–88; Details	10; Three groups	(Bulgaria) Slavia Sofia	a 5–1 / 1–0	(Romania) Argeş Piteşti
1988–89; Details	6 Two groups	(Greece) OFI	3–1; Final played at neutral venue (Serres, Greece).	(Socialist Federal Republic of Yugoslavia) Radnički Niš
1989–90	Competition did not take place due to the Romanian Revolution of 1989.			
1990–91; Details	6 Knock-out	(Romania) Inter Sibiu	1–0 (a.e.t) / 0–0 a	(Socialist Federal Republic of Yugoslavia) Budućnost Titograd
1991–92; Details	5 Knock-out	(Turkey) Sarıyer	1–0 / 0–0 a	(Romania) Oţelul Galaţi
1992–93; Details	6 Knock-out	(Greece) Edessaikos	3–1 / 0–1 a	(Bulgaria) Etar Veliko Tarnovo
1993–94; Details	4 Knock-out	(Turkey) Samsunspor	2–0 / 3–0 a	(Greece) PAS Giannina

- Competition formats:

Round robin: One group.
Two groups: Two groups, top team in each group qualifies for the final
Knock-out: Straight knockout.
Three groups: Two groups of 3 and one group of 4; top teams in the 3-team groups and the top two teams in the 4-team group qualify for the semi-finals

== Performances ==
=== By club ===
When sorted by year of winning or losing final(s), the table is sorted by the year of each club's first final.

Club	Winners	Finalists	Finals	Years of Winning	Years of Losing	Entries	Notes
(Bulgaria) Beroe Stara Zagora	4	1	4	1968, 1969, 1983, 1984	1970	7	1984 Top Spot in Group
(Bulgaria) Slavia Sofia	2	1	3	1986, 1988	1977	5	
(Romania) Rapid Bucureşti	2	-	2	1964, 1966	—	2	Winner in Both Entries
(Greece) Panionios	1	1	2	1971	1986	3	
(Bulgaria) Trakia Plovdiv	1	1	2	1972	1981	2	Reached Final in Both Entries
(Socialist Federal Republic of Yugoslavia) Radnički Niš	1	1	2	1975	1989	3	
(Socialist Federal Republic of Yugoslavia) NK Rijeka	1	1	2	1978	1980	2	Reached Final in Both Entries
(Romania) Sportul Studențesc	1	1	2	1980	1976	3	
(Greece) Olympiacos	1	-	1	1963	—	3	
(Turkey) Fenerbahçe	1	-	1	1967	—	4	
(Albania) Partizani Tirana	1	-	1	1970	—	5	
(Bulgaria) Lokomotiv Sofia	1	-	1	1973	—	4	
(Bulgaria) Akademik Sofia	1	-	1	1974	—	2	
(Socialist Federal Republic of Yugoslavia) Dinamo Zagreb	1	-	1	1976	—	1	
(Greece) Panathinaikos	1	-	1	1977	—	1	
(Socialist Federal Republic of Yugoslavia) Velež Mostar	1	-	1	1981	—	1	
(Greece) Iraklis	1	-	1	1985	—	3	
(Greece) OFI	1	-	1	1989	—	2	
(Romania) Inter Sibiu	1	-	1	1991	—	1	
(Turkey) Sarıyer	1	-	1	1992	—	1	
(Greece) Edessaikos	1	-	1	1993	—	1	
(Turkey) Samsunspor	1	-	1	1994	—	2	
(Romania) Steagul Roşu Braşov	1	-	-	1961	—	4	1961 Top Spot in Group
(Romania) Argeş Piteşti	-	2	2	—	1984, 1985, 1988	3	1984 Runner-up in Group
(Socialist Federal Republic of Yugoslavia) Vardar Skopje	-	2	2	—	1972, 1974	4	
(Bulgaria) Levski Sofia	-	1	1	—	1961, 1963	3	1961 Runner-up in Group
(Bulgaria) Spartak Plovdiv	-	1	1	—	1964	2	
(Romania) Farul Constanţa	-	1	1	—	1966	4	
(Greece) AEK Athens	-	1	1	—	1967	4	
(Bulgaria) Spartak Sofia	-	1	1	—	1968	1	
(Albania) Dinamo Tirana	-	1	1	—	1969	5	
(Albania) Besa Kavajë	-	1	1	—	1971	2	
(Romania) Târgu Mureș	-	1	1	—	1973	2	
(Turkey) Eskişehirspor	-	1	1	—	1975	3	
(Romania) Jiul Petroşani	-	1	1	—	1978	1	
(Albania) 17 Nëntori Tirana	-	1	1	—	1983	4	
(Socialist Federal Republic of Yugoslavia) Budućnost Podgorica	-	1	1	—	1991	2	
(Romania) Oţelul Galaţi	-	1	1	—	1992	1	
(Bulgaria) Etar Veliko Tarnovo	-	1	1	—	1993	3	
(Greece) PAS Giannina	-	1	1	—	1994	2	
Total	28	26	52	52 Teams in Finals, since 1961 and 1983–84 editions were contested in Group Format.			

- All 24 Clubs (out of 89 in total) that appeared in the Balkans Cup for 3 times or more, eventually Reached the Final with the exception of: Galatasaray (5 entries) and Beşiktaş (3) of Turkey, Vllaznia Shkodër (3) of Albania and Universitatea Craiova (3) of Romania.
- Beroe Stara Zagora of Bulgaria is competition's Record Holder concerning participation (7 entries), finals reached (4, plus one top spot in group) and wins (4), while in their single lost final against Partizani for 1970 edition, they opted not showing up in Tirana for the return leg of a 1–1 draw at home.
- Next to Beroe's 4, their compatriots Slavia Sofia reached 3 Finals (2 wins), while Romanian Argeş Piteşti had 2 (no win), plus one runner-up spot in group (each time they entered the competition, ended up in the losing side).
- 6 clubs won Balkans Cup in their Single Entry: Dinamo Zagreb (Yugoslavia, now Croatia) in 1976, Panathinaikos Athens (Greece) in 1977, Velež Mostar (Yugoslavia, now Bosnia and Herzegovina) in 1980–81, Inter Sibiu (Romania) in 1990–91, Sarıyer İstanbul (Turkey) in 1991–92 and Edessaikos Edessa (Greece) in 1992–93 edition.

=== By country ===
Clubs from Bosnia and Herzegovina, Croatia, North Macedonia, Montenegro and Serbia competed as part of SFR Yugoslavia.

Country	Winners	Finalists	Finals	Clubs won in final(s)	Clubs did not win in final(s)
Bulgaria	9	7	15	Beroe Stara Zagora (4); Slavia Sofia (2); Trakia Plovdiv (1); Lokomotiv Sofia (1); Akademik Sofia (1)	Levski Sofia (1 + Runner-up spot in 1961.); Spartak Plovdiv (1) Spartak Sofia (1); Beroe Stara Zagora (1); Slavia Sofia (1) Trakia Plovdiv (1); Etar Veliko Tarnovo (1)
Greece	6	3	9	Olympiacos (1); Panionios (1); Panathinaikos (1); Iraklis (1); OFI (1); Edessaikos (1)	AEK Athens (1); Panionios (1); PAS Giannina (1)
Romania	5	7	11	Rapid Bucureşti (2); Steagul Roşu Braşov (1); Sportul Studențesc Bucureşti (1); Inter Sibiu (1)	Argeş Piteşti (2 + Runner-up spot in 1983–84.); Farul Constanţa (1) ASA 1962 Târgu Mureș (1); Sportul Studențesc Bucureşti (1); Jiul Petroşani (1) Oţelul Galaţi (1)
(Socialist Federal Republic of Yugoslavia) Yugoslavia	4	5	9	Dinamo Zagreb (1) NK Rijeka (1); Radnički Niš (1); Velež Mostar (1) ___ ___	NK Rijeka (1); Radnički Niš (1) —— Vardar Skopje (2); Budućnost Podgorica (1)
	2	1	3	Dinamo Zagreb (1) NK Rijeka (1); Radnički Niš (1); Velež Mostar (1) ___ ___	NK Rijeka (1); Radnički Niš (1) —— Vardar Skopje (2); Budućnost Podgorica (1)
	1	1	2	Dinamo Zagreb (1) NK Rijeka (1); Radnički Niš (1); Velež Mostar (1) ___ ___	NK Rijeka (1); Radnički Niš (1) —— Vardar Skopje (2); Budućnost Podgorica (1)
	1	-	1	Dinamo Zagreb (1) NK Rijeka (1); Radnički Niš (1); Velež Mostar (1) ___ ___	NK Rijeka (1); Radnički Niš (1) —— Vardar Skopje (2); Budućnost Podgorica (1)
	-	2	2	Dinamo Zagreb (1) NK Rijeka (1); Radnički Niš (1); Velež Mostar (1) ___ ___	NK Rijeka (1); Radnički Niš (1) —— Vardar Skopje (2); Budućnost Podgorica (1)
	-	1	1	Dinamo Zagreb (1) NK Rijeka (1); Radnički Niš (1); Velež Mostar (1) ___ ___	NK Rijeka (1); Radnički Niš (1) —— Vardar Skopje (2); Budućnost Podgorica (1)
Turkey	3	1	4	Fenerbahçe İstanbul (1); Sarıyer İstanbul (1); Samsunspor (Samsun) (1)	Eskişehirspor (Eskişehir) (1)
Albania	1	3	4	Partizani Tirana (1)	Dinamo Tirana (1) Besa Kavajë (1); 17 Nëntori Tirana (1)
Total	28	26	52	52 Teams in Finals, since 1961 and 1983–84 editions were contested in Group Format.	

Top performer by country:

Country	Club	Winners	Finalists	Finals	Entries	Notes
(Bulgaria) BUL	Beroe Stara Zagora	4	1	4	7	Balkans Cup record holder in wins, finals reached and entries.
(Romania) ROU	Rapid Bucureşti	2	-	2	2	
(Socialist Federal Republic of Yugoslavia) YUG	NK Rijeka	1	1	2	2	Radnički Niš (Socialist Federal Republic of Yugoslavia) same performance in 3 entries.
(Greece) GRE	Panionios	1	1	2	3	
(Turkey) TUR	Sarıyer İstanbul	1	-	1	1	Samsunspor and Fenerbahçe (Turkey) 1 win in 2 and 4 entries respectively.
(Albania) ALB	Partizani Tirana	1	-	1	5	

== Participation ==
=== By club ===
In the 33 years of its existence, a total of 89 clubs from 6 countries appeared in the 28 Balkans Cup editions. Two of them, both Turkish, withdrawn their participation before playing a single match: Zonguldakspor in 1980–81 and Trabzonspor in 1986. Sides with 4 entries or more:

Club	Country	Entries	Winners	Finalists	Finals	First Edition	Last Edition	Notes
Beroe Stara Zagora	(Bulgaria) BUL	7	4	1	4	1967–68	1992–93	
Slavia Sofia	(Bulgaria) BUL	5	2	1	3	1977	1987–88	
Partizani	(Albania) ALB	5	1	-	1	1961	1979–80	
Dinamo Tirana	(Albania) ALB	5	-	1	1	1961–63	1987–88	
Galatasaray	(Turkey) TUR	5	-	-	-	1961–63	1990–91	Also Withdrew in 1977–78 and 1979–80.
Steagul Roşu Braşov	(Romania) ROU	4	1	-	-	1961	1972	
Fenerbahçe	(Turkey) TUR	4	1	-	1	1961	1967–68	Also Withdrew in 1963–64.
Lokomotiv Sofia	(Bulgaria) BUL	4	1	-	1	1966–67	1988–89	
Vardar Skopje	(Socialist Federal Republic of Yugoslavia) YUG	4	-	2	2	1964–66	1974	
Farul Constanţa	(Romania) ROU	4	-	1	1	1964–66	1975	
AEK Athens	(Greece) GRE	4	-	1	1	1961	1980–81	
17 Nëntori Tirana	(Albania) ALB	4	-	1	1	1964–66	1990–91	

=== By country ===
Bulgarian and Turkish sides were present at each one of the 28 Balkans Cup editions, while Yugoslavian were absent 9 times in total, entering just twice during its last decade of existence (ironically, reaching both finals). Generally, South Slavs (both Football Association and clubs) were never keen supporters of the competition, as they had neither been enthusiastic about the national teams' Balkan Cup, too.

		Bulgaria	Turkey	Romania	Greece	Albania	Yugoslavia
Number of different sides that entered		15	17	18	15	12	12
Editions of Balkans Cup that
[1]	Country was represented by at least one club	28	28	27	27	26	20
[2]	Country's club withdrew before playing a match	—	5	—	1	—	1
[3]	Country was still represented by another club	—	1	—	1	—	—
[4]	Country's clubs competed (=[1]-[2]+[3])	28	24	27	27	26	19
Country's clubs were absent (=28 total editions-[4])		—	4	1	1	2	9
Years/editions that country's clubs were absent		—	1977 to 1981; 1986	1993–94 (Last Cup)	1983–84	1983 to 1985	1961 (First Cup); 1983 to 1988; 1991–end
[5]	Editions a club quit after playing at least one match	1	5	1	4	—	1
Editions a club withdrew or quit (=[2]+[5])		1	10	1	5	—	2
[6]	Editions with double entry	8	5	6	3	1	—
[7]	Total entries (=[4]-[3]+[6])	36	28	33	29	27	19
[8]	Cups won	9	3	5	6	1	4
% success in winning the Cup (=[8]÷[7]×100)		25%	11%	15%	21%	4%	21%
[9]	Finals reached	15	4	11	9	4	9
% success in reaching the final (=[9]÷[7]×100)'		42%	14%	33%	31%	15%	47%

Despite the fact that in each edition there was at least one Turkish side initially entering, in no less than 5 occasions it withdrew before playing a single match and in 5 more quit during group stage, after unsuccessful results. Greeks followed with 1 withdrawal and 4 quits, while clubs from all countries had sporadically terminated their participation in some early stage of the competition, except for Albanian. Multiple winner and several other records holder Beroe Stara Zagora, became the only Bulgarian side ever to withdraw or quit a Balkans Cup match and the single one to do so in a final, by not showing up for 1970 edition's return leg against Partizani Tirana of Albania, following a 1-1 draw at home.

== See also ==
- Balkan Cup
- Challenge Cup
- European Railways Cup
- Latin Cup
- Mitropa Cup
