= Daniil Papadopoulos =

Greek footballer

Personal information
- Date of birth: 15 June 1963 (age 63)
- Place of birth: Thessaloniki, Greece
- Position: Midfielder

Youth career
- –1981: Olympos Dendropotamou

Senior career*
Years	Team	Apps	(Gls)
1981–1998	Iraklis	419	(64)

International career^{‡}
1982–1985	Greece U21		
1989–1993	Greece	5	(0)

Managerial career
- 1999–2001: Iraklis (assistant)
- 2001: Iraklis (caretaker)
- 2002–2003: Kassandra
- 2004: Kavala
- 2005: Pavlos Melas
- * Club domestic league appearances and goals as of 3 February 2011 ‡ National team caps and goals as of 3 February 2011

Daniil Papadopoulos (Greek: Δανιήλ Παπαδόπουλος; born 15 June 1963) is a former Greek footballer that played in several positions throughout his career. He was born in Thessaloniki and played youth football with Olympos Dendropotamou before starting his professional career with Iraklis. Papadopoulos spent his entire professional career with Iraklis and he is the all-time leader for Iraklis with 419 appearances. Papadopoulos is also the second all-time goalscorer of Iraklis with 64 goals. He managed to gain 5 caps for Greece. Papadopoulos also had a brief career in management, as an assistant and caretaker manager of Iraklis and as a manager in second and third-tier teams.

== Club career ==
=== Early life and career ===
Papadopoulos was born in Thessaloniki and started playing football for amateur side Olympos Dendropotamou. When he was a child he watched the matches of Iraklis at Kaftanzoglio with his uncle. Following interest from PAOK he signed for Iraklis for a 600,000 drachmas fee.

=== Iraklis ===
Papadopoulos joined the reserve squad of Iraklis, but he was soon promoted to the first team under Apostol Chachevski. In December 1981 he made his debut for Iraklis against Kastoria. He managed to score his first goal for the club in his debut, but this was not enough to prevent Iraklis from suffering a bitter 2–1 away defeat. He was mostly used as a striker in his first season for Iraklis and he scored a total of 9 goals out of 23 appearances. In the next season he established himself in the starting lineup of Iraklis and he proved even more prolific, by scoring 11 goals in 30 matches.

Later on in his career in the 1985–86 season, under manager Telis Batakis, he had to adapt in a more defensive role as he started playing as a left wingback. Even from the midfield Papadopoulos scored 5 goals in 28 appearances for Iraklis. In the later stages of his career he was placed in the centre of the defence of Iraklis, by then manager Dušan Mitošević. His last match wearing the shirt of Iraklis was for the last round of the 1997–98 season, as Iraklis recorded a 4–2 home win against Apollon Athens. At the end of the season he retired, having spent his entire professional career playing for Iraklis in a time span of 17 years. During these years he managed to become the all-time leader in appearances for the club with 419 appearances and the second all-time goalscorer with 64 goals.

== International career ==
Papadopoulos gained 5 caps for the Greece national team. He made his debut on 11 October 1989 during an away 4–0 defeat from Bulgaria for the 1990 World Cup qualifiers.

== Managerial career ==
He was the assistant manager in Iraklis during the Angelos Anastasiadis era. Also together with former teammate Savvas Kofidis he was the assistant manager of Giannis Kyrastas in Iraklis during the 2000–01 season. After Kyrastas left the club in March Papadopoulos was appointed caretaker manager of the club. He also had managerial spells for Kassandra, Kavala and Pavlos Melas.

== Personal life ==
Papadopoulos is the father of midfielder Giannis Papadopoulos.

== Honours ==
Iraklis

- Balkans Cup: 1984–85

== See also ==
- List of one-club men in association football
