= PFC Slavia Sofia in European football =

Matches history of PFC Slavia Sofia football club, in European competitions

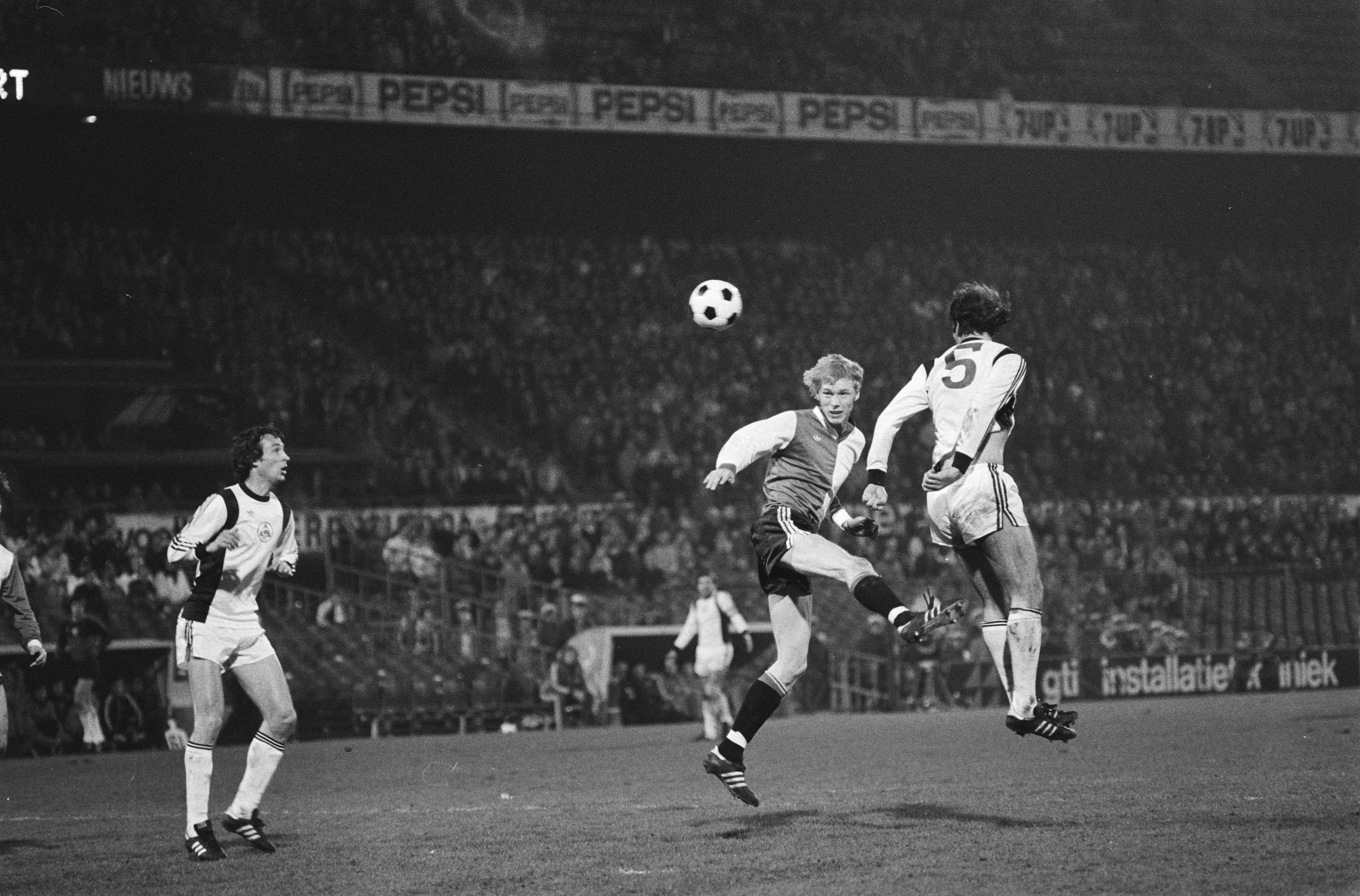
- Pétur Pétursson (left) in a duel for the ball against Ivan Iliev (right) during the Feyenoord - Slavia match in Rotterdam, 18/03/1981.
- Most appearances: (Bulgaria) Aleksandar Shalamanov (21)
- Top scorer: (Bulgaria) Ilia Velichkov (5)
- First entry: 1963-64 European Cup Winners' Cup
- Latest entry: 2020–21 UEFA Europa League

This article lists the results of PFC Slavia Sofia in European football since the club's first participation in 1963.

Throughout its history, Slavia has participated in various European tournaments, such as the UEFA Cup Winners' Cup, the Inter-Cities Fairs Cup, the UEFA Cup/UEFA Europa League as well as the UEFA Intertoto Cup.

The club also took part in five editions of the Balkans Cup, which it managed to win on two occasions: in 1986 and 1988.

Slavia's very first European game was played on 2 October 1963 in Budapest against MTK, in the first round of the UEFA Cup Winners' Cup. Slavia suffered a minimal 0:1 loss.

The first European goal for the club was scored a week later on 9 October 1963, in the second leg of the first round, by striker Mihail Mishev, the game ending in a 1-1 draw.

Slavia Sofia's greatest achievement came in the 1966-67 season, when the club reached the semi-finals of the European Cup Winners' Cup, becoming the first ever Bulgarian club to reach a semi-final of a major European competition.

In 1977, the club accomplished another great result, finishing first place in their UEFA Intertoto Cup group.

== Overall record ==
Competition	Pld	W	D	L	GF	GA	GD	Win%
European Cup Winners' Cup	25	9	3	13	31	31	+0	36.00
Inter-Cities Fairs Cup	8	3	2	3	7	10	−3	37.50
UEFA Cup / UEFA Europa League	23	7	3	13	26	51	−25	30.43
UEFA Intertoto Cup	42	18	8	16	61	58	+3	42.86
Total	98	37	16	45	125	150	−25	37.76

== Results ==
Season	Competition	Round	Opponent	Home	Away	Aggregate
1963–64	Cup Winners' Cup	1R	(Hungary) MTK Budapest	1–1	0–1	1–2
1964–65	Cup Winners' Cup	1R	(Republic of Ireland) Cork Celtic	1–1	2–0	3–1
1964–65	Cup Winners' Cup	2R	(Switzerland) Lausanne-Sports	1–0	1–2	2–2 (2–3 play-off)
1966–67	Cup Winners' Cup	1R	(Wales) Swansea Town	4–0	1–1	5–1
1966–67	Cup Winners' Cup	2R	(France) Strasbourg	2–0	0–1	2–1
1966–67	Cup Winners' Cup	QF	(Switzerland) Servette	3–0	0–1	3–1
1966–67	Cup Winners' Cup	SF	(Scotland) Rangers	0–1	0–1	0–2
1968–69	Inter-Cities Fairs Cup	1R	(Scotland) Aberdeen	0–0	0–2	0–2
1969–70	Inter-Cities Fairs Cup	1R	(Spain) Valencia	2–0	1–1	3–1
1969–70	Inter-Cities Fairs Cup	2R	(Scotland) Kilmarnock	2–0	1–4	3–4
1970–71	Inter-Cities Fairs Cup	1R	(Socialist Federal Republic of Yugoslavia) Hajduk Split	1–0	0–3	1–3
1972–73	Cup Winners' Cup	1R	(West Germany) Schalke 04	1–3	1–2	2–5
1973–74	UEFA Cup	1R	(Soviet Union) Dinamo Tbilisi	2–0	1–4	3–4
1975–76	Cup Winners' Cup	1R	(Austria) Sturm Graz	1–0	1–3	2–3
1977	Intertoto Cup	Group 4	(Sweden) Malmö FF	1–0	0–3	1st
1977	Intertoto Cup	Group 4	(West Germany) Hamburg	3–0	3–2	1st
1977	Intertoto Cup	Group 4	(Switzerland) Grasshopper Club	2–1	4–1	1st
1978	Intertoto Cup	Group 3	(West Germany) Hertha Berlin	1–1	0–3	2nd
1978	Intertoto Cup	Group 3	(Sweden) Kalmar FF	4–1	1–1	2nd
1978	Intertoto Cup	Group 3	(Denmark) Vejle	2–0	1–1	2nd
1979	Intertoto Cup	Group 6	(Czechoslovakia) Zbrojovka Brno	2–0	1–3	2nd
1979	Intertoto Cup	Group 6	(Switzerland) Chênois	2–0	2–2	2nd
1979	Intertoto Cup	Group 6	(Austria) LASK	4–1	4–0	2nd
1980	Intertoto Cup	Group 9	(Sweden) Elfsborg	2–1	0–1	2nd
1980	Intertoto Cup	Group 9	(West Germany) VfL Bochum	2–0	1–4	2nd
1980	Intertoto Cup	Group 9	(Socialist Federal Republic of Yugoslavia) Napredak Kruševac	3–2	0–0	2nd
1980–81	Cup Winners' Cup	1R	(Poland) Legia Warsaw	3–1	0–1	3–2
1980–81	Cup Winners' Cup	2R	(Czechoslovakia) Sparta Prague	3–0	0–2	3–2
1980–81	Cup Winners' Cup	QF	(Netherlands) Feyenoord	3–2	0–4	3–6
1982–83	UEFA Cup	1R	(Socialist Federal Republic of Yugoslavia) Sarajevo	2–2	2–4	4–6
1983	Intertoto Cup	Group 2	(Switzerland) Young Boys	0–1	0–1	4th
1983	Intertoto Cup	Group 2	(Czechoslovakia) Slavia Prague	2–1	0–5	4th
1983	Intertoto Cup	Group 2	(Denmark) Brøndby	3–1	0–0	4th
1988	Intertoto Cup	Group 2	(Sweden) IFK Göteborg	0–2	1–2	3rd
1988	Intertoto Cup	Group 2	(Czechoslovakia) Sigma Olomouc	3–1	1–2	3rd
1988	Intertoto Cup	Group 2	(Switzerland) FC Aarau	2–1	1–1	3rd
1988–89	UEFA Cup	1R	(Socialist Federal Republic of Yugoslavia) Partizan	0–5	0–5	0–10
1990	Intertoto Cup	Group 2	(Austria) Tirol Innsbruck	0–2	1–4	4th
1990	Intertoto Cup	Group 2	(West Germany) VfL Bochum	1–1	0–1	4th
1990	Intertoto Cup	Group 2	(Switzerland) St. Gallen	0–2	1–2	4th
1990–91	UEFA Cup	1R	(Cyprus) Omonia	2–1	2–4	4–5 (a.e.t.)
1991–92	UEFA Cup	1R	(Spain) Osasuna	1–0	0–4	1–4
1995–96	UEFA Cup	PR	(Greece) Olympiacos	0–2	0–1	0–3
1996–97	UEFA Cup	PR	(Lithuania) Inkaras Kaunas	4–3	1–1	5–4
1996–97	UEFA Cup	QR	(Austria) Tirol Innsbruck	1–1	1–4	2–5
2016–17	Europa League	1Q	(Poland) Zagłębie Lubin	1–0	0–3	1–3
2018–19	Europa League	1Q	(Finland) Ilves	2–1	1–0	3–1
2018–19	Europa League	2Q	(Croatia) Hajduk Split	2–3	0–1	2–4
2020–21	Europa League	1Q	(Albania) Kukësi	—N/a	1–2	—N/a

== Other competitions ==
=== Balkans Cup ===
Season	Competition	Round	Opponent	Home	Away	Aggregate
1977	Balkans Cup	Group A	(Socialist Republic of Romania) Politehnica Timişoara	5–0	1–0	1st
1977	Balkans Cup	Group A	(Turkey) Altay	6–0	3–0	1st
1977	Balkans Cup	F	(Greece) Panathinaikos	1–1	1–2	Runners-up
1978	Balkans Cup	Group A	(Socialist Republic of Romania) Jiul Petroşani	2–0	0–3	2nd
1978	Balkans Cup	Group A	(Turkey) Galatasaray^{[a]}	—N/a	—N/a	2nd
1980	Balkans Cup	Group B	(Socialist Republic of Romania) Sportul Studențesc	3–2	0–2	2nd
1980	Balkans Cup	Group B	(Turkey) Galatasaray^{[b]}	—N/a	—N/a	2nd
1986	Balkans Cup	QF	(Turkey) Trabzonspor^{[c]}	—N/a	—N/a	w/o
1986	Balkans Cup	SF	(Greece) Iraklis^{[d]}	—N/a	—N/a	w/o
1986	Balkans Cup	F	(Greece) Panionios	3–0	2–3	Champions
1988	Balkans Cup	Group A	(Socialist Republic of Romania) Argeș Pitești	1–2	0–2	2nd
1988	Balkans Cup	Group A	(People's Socialist Republic of Albania) Luftëtari Gjirokastër	4–1	0–2	2nd
1988	Balkans Cup	Group A	(Greece) PAOK	4–0	1–0	2nd
1988	Balkans Cup	SF	(People's Republic of Bulgaria) Sliven	3–1	1–1	4–1
1988	Balkans Cup	F	(Socialist Republic of Romania) Argeș Pitești	5–1	1–0	Champions

Notes:
[a] Galatasaray withdrew from the tournament.
[b] Galatasaray withdrew from the tournament.
[c] Trabzonspor withdrew from the tournament.
[d] Iraklis withdrew from the tournament.

=== Balance ===
Competition	Pld	W	D	L	GF	GA	GD	Win%
Balkans Cup	24	15	2	7	53	22	+31	62.50
Total	24	15	2	7	53	22	+31	62.50

== Honours ==
- Balkans Cup
  - Winners (2): 1986, 1988
- Cup Winners Cup
  - Semi-finalists: 1966–67
- UEFA Intertoto Cup
  - First place in group four: 1977
