= 1984–85 Balkans Cup =

Tournament details
- Country: Balkans
- Teams: 8

Final positions
- Champions: (Greece) Iraklis
- Runners-up: (Romania) Argeș Pitești

Tournament statistics
- Matches played: 12
- Goals scored: 35 (2.92 per match)

The 1984–85 Balkans Cup was an edition of the Balkans Cup, a football competition for representative clubs from the Balkan states. It was contested by 8 teams and Iraklis won the trophy also Hatzipanagis won the POTT (Player Of The Tournament) .

== Quarter-finals ==
| Team 1 | Agg. | Team 2 | 1st leg | 2nd leg |
|---|---|---|---|---|
| Beroe Stara Zagora (Bulgaria) | 4–5 | (Romania) Argeș Pitești | 4–1 | 0–4 |
| Spartak Varna (Bulgaria) | 0–2 | (Turkey) Ankaragücü | 0–0 | 0–2 |
| Aris (Greece) | w/o | (Romania) SC Bacău | – | – |
| Galatasaray (Turkey) | 2–5 | (Greece) Iraklis | 1–0 | 1–5 |

=== First leg ===
4 October 1984

| Beroe Stara Zagora (Bulgaria) | 4–1 | (Romania) Argeș Pitești |

Beroe Stadium, Stara Zagora

4 October 1984

| Ankaragücü (Turkey) | 2–0 | (Bulgaria) Spartak Varna |
|---|---|---|
| İzgiş 9'; Yıldırım 29' |

Ankara 19 Mayıs Stadium, Ankara

25 October 1984

| Iraklis (Greece) | 5–1 | (Turkey) Galatasaray |
|---|---|---|
| Karaiskos 19' (pen.); Adamou 50'; Maloumidis 59'; Hatzipanagis 71'; Papaioannou 76' | | Terim 89' (pen.) |

Kaftanzoglio Stadium, Thessaloniki

=== Second leg ===
28 November 1984

| Spartak Varna (Bulgaria) | 0–0 | (Turkey) Ankaragücü |

Spartak Stadium, Varna

Ankaragücü won 2–0 on aggregate.

28 November 1984

| Argeș Pitești (Romania) | 4–0 | (Bulgaria) Beroe Stara Zagora |

Stadionul 1 Mai, Pitești

Argeș Pitești won 5–4 on aggregate.

12 December 1984

| Galatasaray (Turkey) | 1–0 | (Greece) Iraklis |
|---|---|---|
| Cüneyt Tanman 13' |

Ali Sami Yen Stadium, Istanbul

Iraklis won 5–2 on aggregate.

== Semi-finals ==
| Team 1 | Agg. | Team 2 | 1st leg | 2nd leg |
|---|---|---|---|---|
| SC Bacău (Romania) | 2–4 | (Romania) Argeș Pitești | 2–0 | 0–4 |
| Ankaragücü (Turkey) | 1–1(2–4 p) | (Greece) Iraklis | 1–0 | 0–1 (aet) |

=== First leg ===
27 March 1985

| Argeș Pitești (Romania) | 4–0 | (Romania) SC Bacău |

Stadionul 1 Mai, Pitești

20 February 1985

| Iraklis (Greece) | 1–0 | (Turkey) Ankaragücü |
|---|---|---|
| Hatzipanagis 37' (pen.) |

Kaftanzoglio Stadium, Thessaloniki

=== Second leg ===
31 March 1985

| SC Bacău (Romania) | 2–0 | (Romania) Argeș Pitești |

Stadionul Municipal, Bacău

Argeș Pitești won 4–2 on aggregate.

20 March 1985

| Ankaragücü (Turkey) | 1–0 | (Greece) Iraklis |
|---|---|---|
| Özkara 5' |
Penalties
| | 2–4 |

Ankara 19 Mayıs Stadium, Ankara

Iraklis won 4–2 on penalties.

== Finals ==
| Team 1 | Agg. | Team 2 | 1st leg | 2nd leg |
|---|---|---|---|---|
| Argeș Pitești (Romania) | 4–5 | (Greece) Iraklis | 3–1 | 1–4 |

=== First leg ===
12 June 1985

| Argeș Pitești (Romania) | 3–1 | (Greece) Iraklis |
|---|---|---|
| Ignat 16'; D. Zamfir 41'; Jurcă 77' | | Hatzipanagis 57' (pen.) |

Stadionul 1 Mai, Pitești
Attendance: 15,000

=== Second leg ===
23 June 1985

| Iraklis (Greece) | 4–1 | (Romania) Argeș Pitești |
|---|---|---|
| Grétarsson 38'; Karaiskos 34'; Hatzipanagis 68' (pen.); Kofidis 78' | | Ignat 57' |

Kaftanzoglio Stadium, Thessaloniki
Attendance: 10,000
Referee: Ivan Yosifov (Bulgaria)

Iraklis won 5–4 on aggregate.
