= Antoni Brzeżańczyk =

Polish football player and manager (1919–1987)

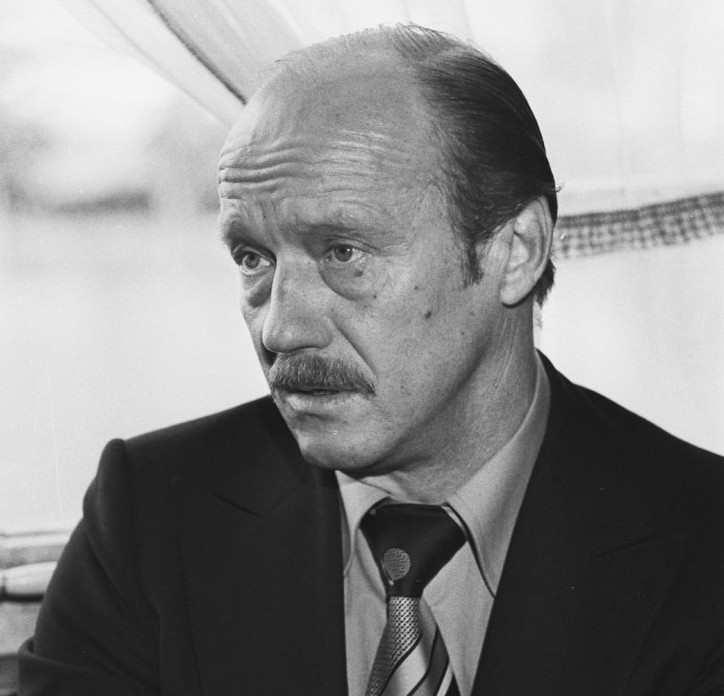

Personal information
- Date of birth: 19 January 1919
- Place of birth: Brzeżany, Poland
- Date of death: 26 May 1987 (aged 68)
- Place of death: Vienna, Austria
- Positions: Forward; midfielder

Senior career*
Years	Team	Apps	(Gls)
- Podgórze Kraków
1947	Dąb Poznań		
1950	Lechia Gdańsk		
1951	Odra Opole		
1951	AKS Chorzów		
1951–1953	Lech Poznań		
1953–1956	Stal Mielec		

Managerial career
- 1954–1956: Stal Mielec
- 1956–1957: Polonia Bydgoszcz
- 1957–1958: Zawisza Bydgoszcz
- 1959–1960: Stal Mielec
- 1961–1962: Warta Poznań
- 1964–1965: GKS Katowice
- 1965: Olimpia Poznań
- 1965–1966: Odra Opole
- 1969–1971: Zagłębie Wałbrzych
- 1971–1972: Górnik Zabrze
- 1972–1973: Zagłębie Sosnowiec
- 1973–1974: Polonia Bytom
- 1974–1975: Wisłoka Dębica
- 1975–1976: Feyenoord
- 1976–1977: Rapid Wien
- 1977–1978: Admira Wien
- 1978–1979: Iraklis
- 1983–1984: Wiener Sportclub
- * Club domestic league appearances and goals

Antoni Brzeżańczyk (19 January 1919 – 26 May 1987) was a Polish football player and manager.

He played for Podgórze Kraków, Dąb Poznań, Lechia Gdańsk, Odra Opole, AKS Chorzów, Lech Poznań and Stal Mielec where he began his coaching career.

He coached Stal Mielec, Polonia Bydgoszcz, Zawisza Bydgoszcz, Warta Poznań, GKS Katowice, Olimpia Poznań, Odra Opole, Zagłębie Wałbrzych, Zagłębie Sosnowiec, Górnik Zabrze, Feyenoord, Rapid Wien, Admira Wien, Iraklis and Wiener Sportclub.

He died in Vienna in 1987.

== Honours ==
Stal Mielec

- II liga North: 1960
