= 1980–81 Beta Ethniki =

Beta Ethniki
- Season: 1980–81
- Dates: 7 September 1980 – 31 May 1981
- Champions: Rodos (South); Iraklis (North)
- Promoted: Rodos; Iraklis
- Relegated: Pelopas Kiato; Olympiakos Neon Liosion; AO Patra; Panarkadikos; Pandramaikos; Edessaikos; Elassona; Odysseas Kordeliou
- Matches: 306
- Goals: 653 (2.13 per match)
- Biggest home win: Iraklis 12–0 Edessaikos
- Biggest away win: Odysseas Kordeliou 0–6 Iraklis
- Highest scoring: Iraklis 12–0 Edessaikos

The 1980–81 Beta Ethniki season was 22nd edition of second tier nationwide championship of Greece. Forty teams participated in the league, divided in two groups, the South and the North Group. Iraklis was named champion of the North Group and got promoted to the Alpha Ethniki. In the South Group Egaleo and Rodos tied and a play-off match, that found Rodos victorious by a 1-0 scoreline, decided the team that was named champion of the South Group and got promoted to the Alpha Ethniki.

On the other hand, Pelopas Kiato, Olympiakos Neon Liosion, AO Patra and Panarkadikos got relegated to the C National Amateur Division from the South Group. Pandramaikos, Edessaikos, PO Elassona and Odysseas Kordeliou were the teams that got relegated from the North Group.

== South Group ==
=== League table ===
Pos	Team	Pld	W	D	L	GF	GA	GD	Pts	Promotion or relegation
1	Rodos (C, P)	38	24	7	7	84	38	+46	55 (Note: Rodos and Egaleo were decided who promote to the Alpha Ethniki in the play-off match.)	Promotion to Alpha Ethniki
2	Egaleo	38	22	11	5	81	32	+49	55	
3	Diagoras Rodos	38	19	9	10	63	50	+13	47	
4	Proodeftiki	38	17	10	11	61	41	+20	44	
5	Acharnaikos	38	14	12	12	49	39	+10	40	
6	Kallithea	38	15	9	14	50	52	−2	39	
7	Panetolikos	38	14	10	14	36	34	+2	38	
8	Irodotos	38	14	9	15	39	41	−2	37	
9	Vyzas Megara	38	16	5	17	44	54	−10	37	
10	Chalkida	38	15	6	17	52	55	−3	36	
11	Olympiakos Loutraki	38	13	10	15	39	50	−11	36	
12	Panegialios	38	12	12	14	32	47	−15	36	
13	Ilisiakos	38	11	13	14	39	41	−2	35	
14	Ethnikos Asteras	38	14	7	17	45	48	−3	35	
15	Panelefsiniakos	38	15	5	18	42	55	−13	35	
16	Fostiras	38	13	10	15	49	58	−9	35 (Note: 1 point deducted?)	
17	Pelopas Kiato (R)	38	12	10	16	38	45	−7	34	Relegation to C National Amateur Division
18	Olympiakos Neon Liosion (R)	38	12	7	19	46	63	−17	31	Relegation to C National Amateur Division
19	AO Patra (R)	38	10	9	19	36	54	−18	29	Relegation to C National Amateur Division
20	Panarkadikos (R)	38	10	5	23	35	63	−28	25	Relegation to C National Amateur Division

(C) Champions; (P) Promoted; (R) Relegated

=== Promotion play-off ===
The Promotion Play-off was played in Heraklion.

Team 1	Score	Team 2
Rodos	1–0 (a.e.t.)	Egaleo

== North Group ==
=== League table ===
Pos	Team	Pld	W	D	L	GF	GA	GD	Pts	Promotion or relegation
1	Iraklis (C, P)	38	26	6	6	99	22	+77	58	Promotion to Alpha Ethniki
2	Pierikos	38	15	14	9	50	34	+16	44	
3	Olympiacos Volos	38	16	9	13	53	47	+6	41	
4	Agrotikos Asteras	38	17	7	14	51	46	+5	41	
5	Makedonikos	38	13	14	11	51	43	+8	40	
6	Apollon Kalamarias	38	14	12	12	41	37	+4	40	
7	Panthrakikos	38	17	6	15	42	48	−6	40	
8	Niki Volos	38	14	11	13	49	43	+6	39	
9	Anagennisi Giannitsa	38	17	5	16	37	38	−1	39	
10	Xanthi	38	16	7	15	41	47	−6	39	
11	Anagennisi Epanomi	38	14	11	13	34	41	−7	39	
12	Veria	38	16	6	16	56	50	+6	38	
13	Almopos Arideas	38	15	8	15	44	45	−1	38	
14	Trikala	38	15	7	16	44	46	−2	37	
15	Eordaikos	38	13	11	14	38	43	−5	37	
16	Naoussa	38	14	8	16	45	49	−4	36	
17	Pandramaikos (R)	38	12	10	16	31	44	−13	34	Relegation to C National Amateur Division
18	Edessaikos (R)	38	12	8	18	46	64	−18	32	Relegation to C National Amateur Division
19	Elassona (R)	38	8	10	20	29	52	−23	26	Relegation to C National Amateur Division
20	Odysseas Kordeliou (R)	38	6	10	22	35	77	−42	22	Relegation to C National Amateur Division

(C) Champions; (P) Promoted; (R) Relegated

== Top scorers ==
Rank	Player	Club	Goals
1	(Greece) Ilias Chatzieleftheriou	Iraklis	24
2	(Greece) Panagiotidis	Chalkida	22
