= Kostas Karapatis =

Greek footballer (1928–2022)

Personal information
- Full name: Konstantinos Karapatis
- Date of birth: 31 December 1929
- Place of birth: Thessaloniki, Greece
- Date of death: 25 April 2022 (aged 92)
- Position: Goalkeeper

Senior career*
Years	Team	Apps	(Gls)
1948–1951	Iraklis		
1951–1957	Olympiacos		
1957–1962	Iraklis		

International career
1955	Greece	1	(0)

Managerial career
- 1961–1962: Edessaikos
- 1964–1965: Edessaikos
- 1967–1968: Iraklis
- 1968: Greece
- 1968–1969: Proodeftiki
- 1969–1970: Pierikos
- 1971–1972: Pierikos
- 1975: Kavala
- 1977–1978: Iraklis
- 1979–1980: Panachaiki
- 1980: Iraklis
- 1981: Atromitos
- 1982: Korinthos
- 1984–1986: Doxa Drama
- 1987: PAS Giannina
- 1987–1988: Doxa Drama
- 1991–1992: Doxa Drama
- 1992–1993: Panetolikos
- 1993–1994: Naoussa
- 1998–1999: Doxa Drama
- * Club domestic league appearances and goals

Kostas Karapatis (Greek: Κώστας Καραπατής; 31 December 1929 – 25 April 2022) was a Greek football player who played as a goalkeeper and manager.

He started his career at Iraklis and in 1951 he was transferred to Olympiacos, with whom he earned 5 Greek championships and 4 Greek cups.

Following his retirement from playing football, he started working as manager. He managed many greek teams and he also coached Greece for only one match.
