= Zacharias Chaliabalias =

Greek footballer (1946–2020)

Personal information
- Date of birth: 8 March 1946
- Place of birth: Thessaloniki, Greece
- Date of death: 22 July 2020 (aged 74)
- Place of death: Thessaloniki, Greece
- Position: Centre-back

Senior career*
Years	Team	Apps	(Gls)
1964–1975	Iraklis	280	

International career^{‡}
1968–1972	Greece	3	(0)
- * Club domestic league appearances and goals as of 6 October 2013 ‡ National team caps and goals as of 6 October 2013

Zacharias Chaliabalias (Greek: Ζαχαρίας Χαλιαμπάλιας; 8 March 1946 – 22 July 2020) was a Greek international footballer who spent his entire career with Iraklis playing as a centre-back.

== Club career ==
Chaliabalias was born in Thessaloniki and started his career at Iraklis in 1964. He was driven out of the club in 1975, after he admitted to a bribe attempt by Panathinaikos officials. Chaliabalias is the fifth all-time leader in league appearances for Iraklis, appearing in no less than 280 occasions for the club.

== International career ==
Chaliabalias made his debut for Greece in a friendly 4–1 home win against Egypt on 21 November 1968. Totally he gained three caps for Greece.

== See also ==
- List of one-club men in association football
