= 1986 Balkans Cup =

Tournament details
- Country: Balkans
- Teams: 8

Final positions
- Champions: (Bulgaria) Slavia Sofia
- Runners-up: (Greece) Panionios

Tournament statistics
- Matches played: 10
- Goals scored: 37 (3.7 per match)

The 1986 Balkans Cup was a football competition for club teams from the Balkan states. It featured eight teams, and Slavia Sofia won the trophy.

== Quarter-finals ==
Team 1	Agg.	Team 2	1st leg	2nd leg
Vllaznia Shkodër (Albania)	0–3	(Romania) Gloria Buzău	0–0	0–3
Botev Vratsa (Bulgaria)	3–6	(Greece) Panionios	1–3	2–3
ASA Târgu Mureș (Romania)	5–6	(Greece) Iraklis	4–2	1–4
Trabzonspor (Turkey)	w/o	(Bulgaria) Slavia Sofia	–	–

=== First leg ===
25 February 1986

Vllaznia Shkodër (Albania)	0–0	(Romania) Gloria Buzău

Vojo Kushi Stadium, Shkodër

28 May 1986

ASA Târgu Mureș (Romania)	4–2	(Greece) Iraklis

ASA, Târgu Mureș

1986

Botev Vratsa (Bulgaria)	1–3	(Greece) Panionios

Hristo Botev Stadium, Vratsa

=== Second leg ===
25 March 1986

Gloria Buzău (Romania)	3–0	(Albania) Vllaznia Shkodër

Stadionul Municipal, Buzău

Gloria Buzău won 3–0 on aggregate.

30 April 1986

Iraklis (Greece)	4–1	(Romania) ASA Târgu Mureș

Kaftanzoglio Stadium, Thessaloniki

Iraklis won 6–5 on aggregate.

1986

Panionios (Greece)	3–2	(Bulgaria) Botev Vratsa

Nea Smyrni Stadium, Athens

Panionios won 6–3 on aggregate.

== Semi-finals ==
Team 1	Agg.	Team 2	1st leg	2nd leg
Gloria Buzău (Romania)	2–4	(Greece) Panionios	1–1	1–3
Iraklis (Greece)	w/o	(Bulgaria) Slavia Sofia	–	–

=== First leg ===
30 April 1986

Panionios (Greece)	3–1	(Romania) Gloria Buzău

Nea Smyrni Stadium, Athens

=== Second leg ===
28 May 1986

Gloria Buzău (Romania)	1–1	(Greece) Panionios

Stadionul Municipal, Buzău

Panionios won 4–2 on aggregate.

== Finals ==
Team 1	Agg.	Team 2	1st leg	2nd leg
Slavia Sofia (Bulgaria)	5–3	(Greece) Panionios	3–0	2–3

=== First leg ===
15 October 1986

Slavia Sofia (Bulgaria)	3–0	(Greece) Panionios
Aleksandrov 30', 82'; Simeonov 60'

Vasil Levski National Stadium, Sofia
Attendance: 5,000
Referee: Alexandru Mustățea (Romania)

=== Second leg ===
5 November 1986

Panionios (Greece)	3–2	(Bulgaria) Slavia Sofia
Mavrikis 5'; Owen 17' (pen.), 23' (pen.)		Mironov 63'; Aleksandrov 67'

Nea Smyrni Stadium, Athens
Attendance: 2,000
Referee: Namin Hoxha (Albania)

Slavia Sofia won 5–3 on aggregate.
