= Iraklis F.C. (Thessaloniki) =

Men's association football team in Greece

Iraklis
- Full name: Γυμναστικός Σύλλογος Θεσσαλονίκης «Ηρακλής»; Gymnastikos Syllogos Thessalonikis "Iraklis"; (Thessaloniki Gymnastic Club "Heracles")
- Nicknames: Γηραιός (Elder); Ημίθεος (Demigod)
- Short name: Iraklis
- Founded: 29 November 1908; 117 years ago; (as Makedonikos Gymnastikos Syllogos)
- Ground: Kaftanzoglio Stadium
- Capacity: 27,560
- Owner: Panagiotis Monemvasiotis
- President: Panagiotis Monemvasiotis
- Coach: Walter Mazzarri
- League: Super League Greece
- 2025–26: Super League 2, 1st of 10 (promoted)
- Website: iraklis-fc.com
Home colours	Away colours

Iraklis F.C., also known as Iraklis VENETIS BAKERIES after its title sponsor, is a professional football club based in the city of Thessaloniki, Macedonia, Greece. Created in 1908, it serves as the professional men's football department of the multisports club of G.S. Iraklis Thessalonikis. They play their home matches at Kaftanzoglio Stadium. As of 2026, the club competes in the first–tier level Super League 1.

G.S. Iraklis Thessalonikis was founded on 29 November 1908 and is one of the oldest and most historic sport clubs in Greece, hence the nickname "Gireos" (Greek: Γηραιός, lit. 'Elder'). In 1910, the name "Iraklís" (Greek: Ηρακλής, lit. 'Heracles', Greek pronunciation: [iɾa'klis]) was added to the club's name as an honour to the ancient Greek demigod Heracles (or Hercules as the Roman equivalent), hence the nickname "Imitheos" (Greek: Ημίθεος, lit. 'Demigod'). The club's colours are blue and white, inspired by the flag of Greece.

Iraklis Thessaloniki is a founding member of Macedonia Football Clubs Association and Hellenic Football Federation. Before the formation of the nationwide league of Alpha Ethniki, Iraklis Thessaloniki competed in the league that was run by the Macedonia Football Clubs Association, winning it on 5 occasions. The club has also played in 5 Greek Cup finals, lifting the trophy once in 1976, which is the club's only domestic trophy. They have also a European trophy, the Balkans Cup, won in 1985.

== History ==
=== Foundation and first years (1899–1912) ===
G.S. Iraklis Thessalonikis traced its roots back on 1 July 1899 when Omilos Filomouson (Greek: Όμιλος Φιλομούσων, lit. 'Muses Friends Group') was established. The club was established as a cultural union of the Greeks of Thessaloniki (then under Ottoman sovereignty), and its sports department was founded in 1902. In 1903 the club joined forces with Olympia, another greek Gymnastic Club of Thessaloniki. Football was a new sport at the time, but rapidly increasing in popularity and thus the board of directors decided to line up a football team. The first football match that was held on 23 April 1905 by the Omilos Filomouson football team which won by 3–0 against Union Sportive, team of the Western European diaspora of Thessaloniki.

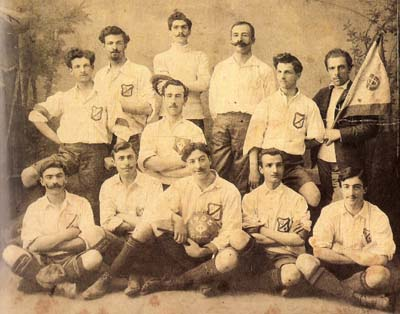
Omilos Filomouson squad on 23 April 1905.

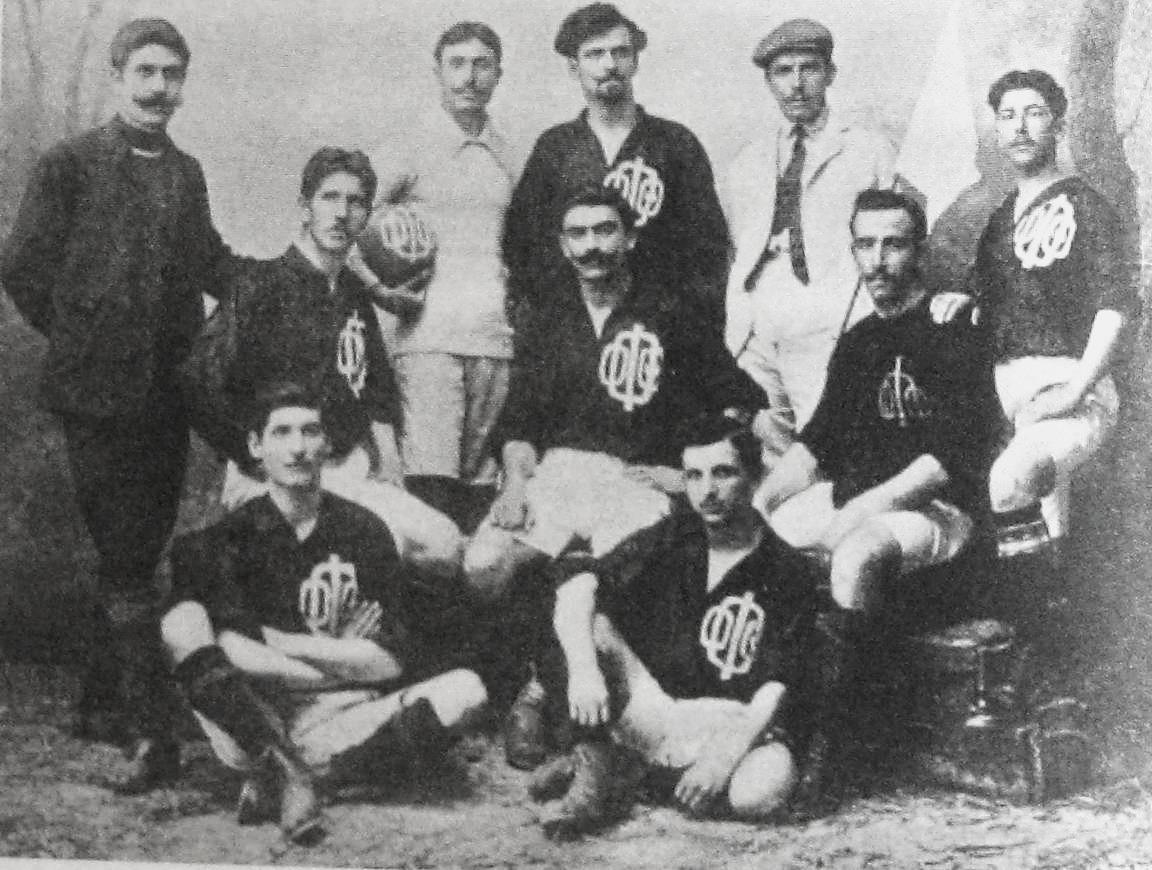
Omilos Filomouson squad at the 1906 Intercalated Games.

Later on, Omilos Filomouson faced financial problems. As a result, members of Omilos Filomouson founded on 29 November 1908 a new sporting club, called Makedonikos Gymnastikos Syllogos (Greek: Μακεδονικός Γυμναστικός Σύλλογος, lit. 'Macedonian Gymnastic Club'), that gained a permission to operate by the Ottoman authorities. The new club's first president was a Greek doctor, Alkiviadis Maltos. The name of the club had a direct reference to the ethnic tensions that took place in the area at that time.

Due to the Young Turks revolt of 1908 and their promises for ease of ethnic tensions in the area, the club was forced to change its name. Thus a new name was decided in 1910 for the club, Othomanikos Ellinikos Gymnastikos Syllogos Thessalonikis "Iraklis" (Greek: Οθωμανικός Ελληνικός Γυμναστικός Σύλλογος Θεσσαλονίκης «Ηρακλής», lit. 'Thessaloniki Ottoman Greek Gymnastic Club "Heracles"'). Τhe name "Iraklís" (Greek: Ηρακλής, lit. 'Heracles') was added to the club's name as an honour to the ancient Greek demigod. The new name was approved, together with a new statute and a new board of directors, by a general assembly of the club on 13 April 1911.

=== G.S. Iraklis Thessalonikis (1912–2012) ===
==== National establishment and early success (1912–1959) ====
After the integration of Thessaloniki in the Kingdom of Greece on 26 October 1912, the operation of the club was accepted by the Greek courts in 1914 and became a fully registered sports club on 11 January 1915 as Gymnastikos Syllogos Thessalonikis "Iraklis" (Greek: Γυμναστικός Σύλλογος Θεσσαλονίκης «Ηρακλής», lit. 'Thessaloniki Gymnastic Club "Heracles"').

Shortly after the end of the Second Balkan War, Iraklis together with the 3 Jewish football clubs of the city, Progrès Sportive, Alliance and French-German School Alumni Union organised the first Thessaloniki Football Championship in January and February 1914. Iraklis won Alliance 3–1, Progrès Sportive 5–1 and after winning the French-German School Alumni Union, the club was proclaimed Champion of Thessaloniki. On 6 April 1914, Iraklis Thessaloniki played a match against Athinaikos Syllogos Podosferiseos, that ended as a draw. It was the club's first match against a club outside Thessaloniki. In 1914, Iraklis established the club's youth squad, so the students of the Greek Gymnasium of the city could train in football. A year later Iraklis won the second Thessaloniki Football Championship. The next championship was not held due to World War I.

In the years following World War I, several football clubs were established in Thessaloniki and that led to the establishment of the Macedonia Football Clubs Association in 1923. The first championship from the newly founded association was organised shortly afterwards and Iraklis lost in the tournament's final 4–1 to Aris. In 1924 Iraklis played its first match against a club from outside the borders of Greece. It was a match against Yugoslav club SSK Skopje, a contest that ended 2–1 in favour of Iraklis. It was in that same year that Iraklis played its first match abroad, a 3–0 friendly win against SK Bitola. In 1926 the club appointed Hungarian József Schweng as manager, the first ever foreign manager in Greece. Under Schweng's guidance, Iraklis won the Championship organised by the Macedonia Football Clubs Association in 1926–27. By winning 6–0 against the reigning champion of Western Macedonia Ermis Sorovič and the champion of Eastern Macedonia and Thrace Rodopi, Iraklis was proclaimed Champion of Macedonia and Thrace. In the following years, Iraklis did not have any success, finishing in runner up and even lower positions in the Macedonia Football Clubs Association Championship.

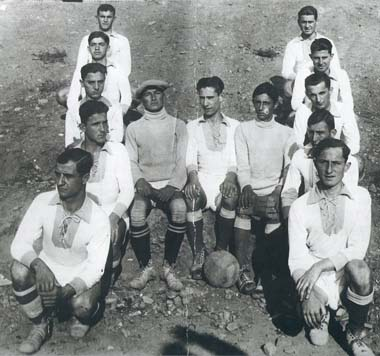
Iraklis squad for the 1930–31 season.

In the 1933–34 season Iraklis won the North Group of the Panhellenic Championship qualifying for the championship final, where the club had to compete against the champion of the South group Olympiacos. The first leg was played in Iraklis Ground on 10 June 1934. Although Iraklis took a 2–0 lead at half time, Olympiacos managed to make a comeback in the second half, winning the game by a 2–3 scoreline. The second leg was played a week later in Piraeus and Olympiacos was proclaimed National champion by winning this match 2–1.

In the following years Iraklis faced mid table mediocrity, with the exception of the 1936–37 season, when the club was only one point short to Macedonia Football Clubs Association champions PAOK. The 1938–39 season was a successful one for Iraklis, as it won both the Macedonia Football Clubs Association championship and the North Group of the Panhellenic Championship, the second resulting in the qualification of Iraklis in the National final. In the national final Iraklis lost to AEK Athens both away and at home (1–3 and 2–4 respectively), failing to win the silverware. In the following season Iraklis celebrated its consecutive win in the Macedonia Football Clubs Association Championship but failed to qualify for the National final.

All football competitions were suspended in Greece due to Axis occupation of Greece from 1941 to 1945. After the war period, the club was constantly competing with Aris for Macedonia F.C.A. Championship, which gave upon its winner the right to participate in Panhellenic Championship. Iraklis participated in the 1947 Greek Cup final, where was defeated 5–0 by the dominant greek club of that era, Olympiacos. In the 1950s, the team solidified its position among the top teams in Greece along with Olympiacos, Panathinaikos, AEK Athens, PAOK and Aris. Nevertheless, the club struggled with financial difficulties in an ailing Greek economy. Thessaloniki (where many refugees from the Greco-Turkish War of 1919–1922 had settled) was particularly damaged by the economic downturn. The highlight of the decade was the 1957 Greek Cup final, in which Iraklis was once again defeated 2–0 by Olympiacos.

==== Semi-professional Alpha Ethniki era (1959–1975) ====
Iraklis played in the inaugural season of Alpha Ethniki. The club secured the 10th position in the first season of national top tier of Greece. Iraklis football academy was founded during the same season after the suggestion of club manager Panos Markovic. In the 1960–61 season Iraklis finished 8th and achieved a record 4–0 win against Atromitos Piraeus. The club also reached the Greek Cup semi-finals that season, getting eliminated by Panionios. The following two seasons Iraklis played in the Inter-Cities Fairs Cup, getting eliminated both times, by F.K. Vojvodina and Real Zaragoza respectively. In the league, Iraklis secured the 6th position for the 1961–62 season, a club record at the time. The rest of the 1960s, Iraklis secured mid-table positions repeating the club record in the 1969–70 season. In 1965, Kostas Aidiniou, a player that together with fellow Greek international Zacharias Chaliabalias would lead the club for the following decade, debuted for Iraklis. During the 1968–69 season Iraklis matched its record win as it won AEL Limassol by a 4–0 margin.

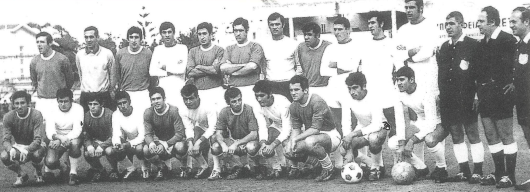
Nea Salamis Famagusta against Iraklis Thessaloniki in G.S.E. Stadium, Famagusta for an exhibition game in 1970.

In the 1970–71 season Iraklis, under the guidance of Yugoslav manager Ljubiša Spajić, finished 5th in the league, the club's best positioning since the establishment of Alpha Ethniki. In that season, Iraklis sold 45,634 tickets in a 1–0 home win against Panathinaikos, a club record since today and an Alpha Ethniki record at the time. The following for seasons, Iraklis achieved safe mid-table positions. In 1972, Iraklis signed Dimitris Gesios from Kozani, a player that would become the club's all-time league top-scorer. In the 1973–74 season Iraklis broke its biggest win record in Alpha Ethniki, by beating AEL 6–1. On 29 August 1974, Iraklis sold its star player Kostas Aidiniou to Olympiacos for 11,000,000 drachmas. In the next season Iraklis beat Kalamata 5–0 at home to match its record win and finished 8th in the league. The club also reached the semi-final of 1974–75 Greek Cup. Iraklis was eliminated 1–2 by Panathinaikos at home. After the match, three players of Iraklis, Chaliabalias, Rokidis and Nikoloudis revealed that there was an attempt from Panathinaikos officials to bribe them for the semi-final. The two first were driven out of the club while the latter was sent off the club for six months.

==== The Absolute Star: Vasilis Hatzipanagis era (1975–1990) ====
On 22 November 1975, the club acquired Vasilis Hatzipanagis, a USSR national of Greek descent, who was late voted a Greece's Golden player for UEFA Jubilee Awards. In the 1975–76 Greek Cup competition Iraklis eliminated Veria, Pierikos, Trikala and Panetolikos to reach the semi-finals. In the semi-finals Iraklis beat Panathinaikos 3–2, at home. Panathinaikos appealed against the result claiming the Iraklis winning goal came from an offside position. Finally the courts turned down Panathinaikos appeal and Iraklis qualified to the final to face Olympiacos. On 9 June 1976 Iraklis won the Cup after a 6–5 penalty shootout. In the final Hatzipanagis scored twice, Kousoulakis and Gesios scored once each, in a match that ended 2–2 in full-time and 4–4 in extra-time. In the league Iraklis finished in the 8th position led by Gesios and Hatzipanagis, that scored 9 and 6 goals respectively.

1976 Greek Cup final starting lineup

In the next season Iraklis was eliminated from Cypriot club APOEL in 1976–77 European Cup Winners' Cup and struggled in the league finishing in the 12th position, gathering just one point more from relegated Panetolikos. Iraklis improved slightly in the next season ending up 9th in the league with Gesios achieving a personal best scoring 13 goals. In the 1978–79 season Iraklis mproved greatly under the guidance of Antoni Brzeżańczyk. Iraklis finished 6th in the league, had a positive goal aggregate for the first time since the 1973–74 season and achieved the club's biggest victory in Alpha Ethniki by beating A.S. Rodos by an 8–1 margin.

The 1979–80 season was the first season of fully professional football in Greece. Iraklis finished in the 8th position in the league having his best goal difference since the establishment of Alpha Ethniki with +11. The highlight of the season was a 6–0 against title perennial contenders Panathinaikos, which is Panathinaikos' biggest league defeat to date. In 1979–80 Greek Cup Iraklis eliminated Veria, Niki Volos, Almopos Aridea and Panarkadikos to reach the semi-finals. In the semi-finals Iraklis eliminated PAOK, but the club's chairman, Kostas Pertsinidis, was accused for a bribe attempt by PAOK's player Filotas Pellios. Iraklis proceeded to play in the Cup final, but as the players morale was damaged the club was defeated by underdogs Kastoria by a 5–2 margin.

At the end of the season Iraklis was demoted to Beta Ethniki, due to the alleged bribery scandal. Iraklis appealed against that decision, and the club was, later on, declared not guilty, but the club already played in Beta Ethniki. In the 1980–81 season Iraklis had to compete in the Beta Ethniki without his star player Vasilis Hatzipanagis. The club won the championship in the North Group with Ilias Chatzieleftheriou being the top scorer with 24 goals. Iraklis scored a total of 99 goals, conceding 22, and achieved a club league record 12–0 win against Edessaikos. Upon its return to the top tier, Iraklis managed to finish in the 6th position in 1981–82 Alpha Ethniki and achieved the club's best goal difference at the time with +14. In the 1983–84 season, Iraklis finished in third place overall, which remains to date the club's best positioning, since professional football was established in 1959. The club, led by Hatzipanagis that scored 12 goals in the season, also had its best goal difference since the establishment of Alpha Ethniki with +27 goals and its best defence record, conceding only 20 goals.

In the 1984–85 season, Iraklis finished in the 5th position setting the club's offensive record scoring 59 goals. Major contributors to this record were Vasilis Hatzipanagis, Lakis Papaioannou and Sigurður Grétarsson each contributing 10 goals throughout the campaign. In the same season Iraklis won its only international competition, the Balkans Cup. Iraklis had to eliminate Turkish giants Galatasaray by winning 5–2 on aggregate in the quarter-finals, and Ankaragücü through a penalty shoot-out in the semi-finals. In the final's second leg Iraklis won Argeș Pitești by 4–1, thus winning the trophy 5–4 on aggregate. In the 1985–86 season, Iraklis finished in the fourth position having the best defensive record in the league conceding 22 goals, led by Lakis Papaioannou who finished the season with 8 goals. Two years later, 17,000 fans travelled to Athens to support Iraklis in the 1987 Greek Cup final, unfortunately to see their team lose 3–1 on penalties (1–1 regular time) to OFI. On 9 November 1990, shortly after the 1990–91 UEFA Cup match against Valencia, Vasilis Hatzipanagis announced his retirement from professional football. Iraklis competed in 1990–91 UEFA Cup against Valencia, being eliminated in overtime at Mestalla Stadium.

==== Reconstruction and change of ownership (1990–2007) ====
The 1990s were a period of reconstruction for the club, as aging players either left the club or retired. Vasilis Hatzipanagis retirement in 1990 had a major negative impact on the team's success. Fans began calling for a change in the club's management, as club president Petros Theodoridis began selling the team's most talented players (Christos Kostis, Georgios Anatolakis, Savvas Kofidis etc.).

The team was sold in 2000 to prominent Greek businessman Evangelos Mytilineos for almost €3,500,000 (1.18 billion drachmas). Despite the acquisition of many promising players during the first summer, the 2000–2001 campaign didn't have the expected results, with the club finishing in 5th position, out of European qualification spots. However, Iraklis managed to progress to the 2nd round of UEFA Cup, where they achieved a memorable (although without any effect) win over 1. FC Kaiserslautern in Fritz-Walter-Stadion. Next summer, Mytilineos's first move was to sell the highly rated striker and fans' favorite Michalis Konstantinou to Panathinaikos, setting a new record for the highest fee received for a domestic transfer. That move worsened the relationship between the new owner and the fans, while it clearly weakened the club, since Konstantinou was not replaced. Manager Giannis Kyrastas, who was widely considered one of Greece's bests, was replaced by previous coach Angelos Anastasiadis who in his second tenure managed to qualified once again for the UEFA Cup on a very small budget.

In 2003, Evangelos Mytilineos announced his desire to leave the team and therefore sell it to Giorgos Spanoudakis (a friend of his from their school years, who used to be first vice-president of the club), for just €1, since the team was heavily in debt. Giorgos Spanoudakis initiated a series of expensive but unsuccessful deals like Polish international Cezary Kucharski and Serie A veteran Giuseppe Signori, driving the team close to bankruptcy. He later tried to get rid of the team by selling it to yet another businessman, named Dimitris Choulis, who had been a president of Akratitos. After a 5-month period during which Dimitris Choulis controlled the team, the Professional Sports Committee finally annulled the transfer, raising questions in the media regarding its handling of the previous one between Evangelos Mytilineos and Giorgos Spanoudakis, too.

In January 2004, Savvas Kofidis, famous as a player of the team in the 1980s, became the team's manager. During the 2005–06, he led Iraklis to an acclaimed 4th-place finish, playing effective and attractive football, creating a club record for 13 consecutive wins at home. However, with considerable debts to players, coaches and the state, Spanoudakis started the 2006–07 season attempting to reconcile Iraklis finances by selling Joël Epalle and Panagiotis Lagos, who were instrumental in the previous year's success. Next year Kofidis resigned as manager of a considerably weakened team after Iraklis lost 7 and drew 2 of his first nine games in Super League and additionally was eliminated from the UEFA Cup in extra time by Wisła Kraków. Eventually the 2006–07 season ended in a hard breaking fashion as the team gained its survival to Greek Super League only in the last matchday, after breaking a 39 matches unbeaten home run of Skoda Xanthi.

==== Financial collapse and relegations (2007–2011) ====
On 13 July 2007, Giorgos Spanoudakis eventually resigned and the team passed to the hands of a consortium of local businessmen, with prominent Greek singer Antonis Remos (a lifelong fan of the team) as their leader. The new owners tried to stabilize the team financially having already paid the debts to Giuseppe Signori (almost $1,000,000) and to other players and lenders from the past.

However, on 4 May 2011 Iraklis Thessaloniki was demoted to Football League after failing to obtain a license to participate in 2011–12 Super League. On 19 May 2011, the Disciplinary Committee of the competition found Iraklis Thessaloniki guilty of forgery during the winter transfer window. Therefore, the club was automatically placed in the last position. That is a unique case as Iraklis Thessaloniki has never finished in a relegation spot but has been relegated twice. Moreover, on 26 September the Professional Sports Committee stripped Iraklis Thessaloniki from its professional licence and demoted the club to Delta Ethniki. This situation spurred reactions from Iraklis Thessaloniki fans, with demonstrations in Thessaloniki and Athens.

=== A.E.P. Iraklis 1908 (2012–2019) ===
The team finally competed in the 2011–12 Delta Ethniki, which started late due to Koriopolis, without much success. Meanwhile, the club's board was discussing a possible merger with another club. There were discussions with local teams Agrotikos Asteras Evosmos and Anagennisi Epanomi. On 3 January 2012, a pre-agreement contract was signed between G.S. Iraklis Thessalonikis and M.A.E. Pontion Katerinis regarding the running of the new club, with further negotiations planned after six months. On 20 January 2012, the merger was approved by G.S. Iraklis Thessalonikis, and their football team was disbanded and withdrawn from Delta Ethniki. M.A.E. Pontion Katerinis changed its name to Athlitiki Enosi Pontion "Iraklis" 1908 (Greek: Αθλητική Ένωση Ποντίων «Ηρακλής» 1908, lit. 'Pontians Sporting Union "Heracles" 1908'), took the logo and the colors of G.S. Iraklis Thessalonikis, and moved to Kaftanzoglio Stadium. The squad consisted of players from both teams and was training in Katerini. The resulting team replaced M.A.E. Pontion Katerinis in 2011–12 Football League 2. On 23 January 2012, the team played their first game at home against Tilikratis Lefkada, while pending approval of the merger by the Greek Professional Sports Committee.

On 24 September 2012, the merged club was accepted in Greek Football League, as an acknowledgement of injustice against the old Iraklis Thessalonikis P.A.E.. In 2012 the new company was named A.E.P. Iraklis 1908 P.A.E.. The new merged club has no legal connection to the original G.S. Iraklis Thessalonikis, but is essentially considered as a direct continuation of it, as it uses the crest of Iraklis Thessaloniki, its colours, and incorporates players and people associated with the former Iraklis Thessaloniki. Therefore, G.S. Iraklis Thessaloniki has no shares of the new company, but instead still holds the 10% of the bankrupt original company of Iraklis Thessalonikis P.A.E., which remains to be dissolved.

After several months of negotiations, Spyros Papathanasakis became the new major shareholder of the club in the summer of 2014. Iraklis returned in Super League in 2015, after four years of absence. After two seasons in Super League (2015-16, 2016-17), Iraklis was relegated from the First Division for the third time in his history, even though it didn't finish in a relegation position. Also was dissolved as a professional club the same year, due to major financial issues the club had been facing for some years. They failed to participate in Football League and were thus dissolved as a professional football club and begun the season in Gamma Ethniki. The next season they promoted back in Football League. In 2018 the new company was named A.E.P. Iraklis 1908 Nea P.A.E..

=== A.S. Iraklis 2015 (2019–2020) ===
Iraklis was relegated in 2019 from the professional second-tier Football League into the amateur fourth-tier Gamma Ethniki, due to the restructuring of the Greek national championships and its performance in conjunction to its financial state. This led the professional club into further insolvency and an inability to form a squad to participate in any championship in the 2019–20 season.

Faced with this situation, a new football club was formed through the volleyball club of Iraklis Volleyball 2015 on 25 September 2019. The new club was named Athlitikos Syllogos "Iraklis" 2015 (Greek: Αθλητικός Σύλλογος «Ηρακλής» 2015, lit. 'Sporting Club "Heracles" 2015'), which participated in the lowest regional championship of the Thessaloniki region, Macedonia F.C.A. Third Division, which is on the fourth-tier regionally and on the eighth-tier nationally. On 20 April 2020, amateur championships were suspended due to the COVID-19 pandemic, therefore Iraklis won the championship winning all 15 games, scoring 88 goals and conceding 6.

=== A.S. Iraklis Ampelokipon (2020–2021) ===
In September 2020, an agreement between G.S. Iraklis Thessalonikis and A.S. Iraklis Ampelokipon was announced. In the 2020–21 season Iraklis played in Gamma Ethniki and finished second (2nd) in Group 1 with 33 points. In April 2021, N.G.S. Iraklis Thessalonikis 1908 announced the termination of the agreement with A.S. Iraklis Ampelokipon.

=== P.O.T. Iraklis (2021–) ===
On 2 August 2021, an agreement between N.G.S. Iraklis Thessalonikis 1908 and P.O. Triglias was announced. P.O. Triglias changed their name to Panathlitikos Omilos Triglias "Iraklis" (Greek: Παναθλητικός Όμιλος Τρίγλιας «Ηρακλής», lit. 'Triglia Pan-Sporting Group "Heracles"') and moved to Kaftanzoglio Stadium. In 2021 the new company was named P.O.T. Iraklis P.A.E..

In the 2021–22 season Iraklis played in Super League 2, the second tier of the Greek football league system. They finished 7th in North group with 48 points. In the 2022–23 season, Iraklis played in Super League 2 again. They finished 5th in North group with 47 points. They scored 56 goals (1st in the league).

The season 2023–24, start with legal problems plaguing the club during the summer, 15 players left the team. At the start of Super League 2, 16 new players were added to the team and the team manager of the team, Anastasios Katsabis, left. Iraklis relocated football activities to Chalastra Stadium for the remainder of the 2023–24 season. They finished 7th in North group with 30 points.

On 27 September 2023, the Arbitration Court of the E.P.O. rejected the request to withdraw the P.O.T. Iraklis P.A.E. against Bogdan Mara, consequently the team was at risk of relegation from the 2023–24 Super League 2 championship. On the same day, the owner of P.O.T. Iraklis P.A.E., Stratos Evgeniou, announced that it could not meet the repayment of the former footballer and other old debts of Iraklis Thessaloniki P.A.E.. On 2 October 2023, N.G.S. Iraklis Thessaloniki 1908 called on the members and fans of the sports club to help financially at the last moment so that by 6 October 2023, the required financial amount of €225,000 can be collected and the agreement with the former footballer can be completed. At the same time, the coach Sakis Tsiolis and the football players of the team asked Stratos Evgeniou to be paid with less money to collect the necessary financial amount. On 6 October 2023, the selflessness, determination and solidarity of the members and fans of Iraklis Thessaloniki was highlighted. This date is a milestone in the history of the sports club. Within 3 working days, the required financial amount was collected by the fans of Iraklis Thessaloniki and finally the repayment of the former football player of the team was achieved.

After several months of negotiations, Panagiotis Monemvasiotis became the new major financier of the club in the summer of 2024, while Stratos Evgeniou continues having the ownership of the club. In the 2024–25 season, Iraklis finished 2nd in North group of Super League 2 with 36 points.

== Ownership and financing ==
=== Amateur legal entities ===
Period	Amateur juridical entity	Official name	Parent sporting club	Source
1908–10	Sporting club	Makedonikos Gymnastikos Syllogos	G.S. Iraklis Thessalonikis	
1910–12	Sporting club	Othomanikos Ellinikos Gymnastikos Syllogos Thessalonikis "Iraklis"	G.S. Iraklis Thessalonikis	
1912–2012	Sporting club	Gymnastikos Syllogos Thessalonikis "Iraklis"	G.S. Iraklis Thessalonikis	
2012–19	Sporting club	Athlitiki Enosi Pontion "Iraklis" 1908	A.E.P. Iraklis 1908	
2019–20	Sporting club	Athlitikos Syllogos "Iraklis" 2015	A.S. Iraklis 2015	
2020–21	Sporting club	Athlitikos Syllogos "Iraklis" Ampelokipon	A.S. Iraklis Ampelokipon	
2021–	Sporting club	Panathlitikos Omilos Triglias "Iraklis"	P.O.T. Iraklis	

=== Professional legal entities ===
Period	Professional juridical entity	Brand name	Distinctive title	Parent sporting club	Source
1979–2011	Football public limited company	Iraklis Thessalonikis Podosferiki Anonymi Eteria	Iraklis Thessalonikis P.A.E.	G.S. Iraklis Thessalonikis	
2012	Salaried football players department	Athlitiki Enosi Pontion Iraklis 1908 Tmima Amivomenon Podosferiston	A.E.P. Iraklis 1908 T.A.P.	A.E.P. Iraklis 1908	
2012–17	Football public limited company	Athlitiki Enosi Pontion Iraklis 1908 Podosferiki Anonymi Eteria	A.E.P. Iraklis 1908 P.A.E.	A.E.P. Iraklis 1908	
2018–19	Football public limited company	Athlitiki Enosi Pontion Iraklis 1908 Nea Podosferiki Anonymi Eteria	A.E.P. Iraklis 1908 Nea P.A.E.	A.E.P. Iraklis 1908	
2021–	Football public limited company	Panathlitikos Omilos Triglias Iraklis Podosferiki Anonymi Eteria	P.O.T. Iraklis P.A.E.	P.O.T. Iraklis	

=== Owners ===
Period	Nationality	Owner	Football public limited company	Source
1979–80	(Greece)	Kostas Pertsinidis	Iraklis Thessalonikis P.A.E.	
1980–83	(Greece)	Dimitris Tertilinis	Iraklis Thessalonikis P.A.E.	
1983–2000	(Greece)	Petros Theodoridis	Iraklis Thessalonikis P.A.E.	
2000–03	(Greece)	Evangelos Mytilineos	Iraklis Thessalonikis P.A.E.	
2003–08	(Greece)	Giorgos Spanoudakis	Iraklis Thessalonikis P.A.E.	
2008–11	(Greece)	Antonis Remos	Iraklis Thessalonikis P.A.E.	
2012–14	(Greece)	Thodoris Papadopoulos	A.E.P. Iraklis 1908 P.A.E.	
2014–17	(Canada) (Greece)	Spyros Papathanasakis	A.E.P. Iraklis 1908 P.A.E.	
2018–19	(United States) (Greece)	Tom Papadopoulos	A.E.P. Iraklis 1908 Nea P.A.E.	
2021–25	(Greece)	Stratos Evgeniou	P.O.T. Iraklis P.A.E.	
2025–	(Greece)	Panagiotis Monemvasiotis	P.O.T. Iraklis P.A.E.	

=== Iraklis Thessalonikis P.A.E. ===
==== Professional era ====
Until 1979 Greek football was semi-professional and each football club was run by a board and a president appointed by its respective multi-sport club, of which it was considered a branch. In the 1979–80 season the football branch of Iraklis became a P.A.E. (S.A.) owned by local businessmen Tertilinis and Pertsinidis. In the 1983–84 season Iraklis was bought by Petros Theodoridis who remained at the helm of the club for almost 17 years. From the beginning of the 1999–2000 season there were demonstrations by the supporters of Iraklis, asking for the resignation of Theodoridis from his presidential seat and the sale of his stocks.

==== Evangelos Mytilineos era (2000–2003) ====
On 11 February 2000 Greek business magnate Evangelos Mytilineos bought the stocks of Petros Theodoridis for a reported 1.18 billion drachmas. On 27 January 2003, two days after a 3–1 away defeat of Iraklis against OFI, Mytilineos gave a press conference in which he announced his withdrawal from Iraklis affairs, due to his disgust with the establishment of Greek football.

==== Giorgos Spanoudakis era (2003–2008) ====
Shortly afterwards the ownership of the club was passed to businessman Giorgos Spanoudakis for €1 and until 2006 the club had accumulated a debt of €8 million, partly because Evangelos Mytilineos did not pay the taxes for the players contracts and partly due to Giorgos Spanoudakis handling of the club's affairs. After a takeover of the club, in 2005, by businessman Dimitris Khoulis failed, while Giorgos Spanoudakis continued having the ownership of Iraklis Thessaloniki. In 2007 Giorgos Spanoudakis declared the club's inability to repay its debts to the players and tried to hand Iraklis stocks to Cypriot businessman Phivos Moridis. After the latter failed to fulfill his promises the deal was cancelled.

==== Antonis Remos era (2008–2011) ====
Greek singer Antonis Remos, a prominent supporter of Iraklis, expressed his interest to undertake the club's fortunes, but he moved back when Spanoudakis asked €500,000 to pass the club's ownership. On 10 July 2007 Iraklis Thessaloniki administration building was set on fire by supporters in an attempt to express their discontent for the cancellation of the club's takeover from Antonis Remos. A few days later, Antonis Remos took charge as the new chairman of the club, while Giorgos Spanoudakis continued having the ownership of Iraklis Thessaloniki. On 8 May 2008 the ownership of the club was passed to Antonis Remos.

==== Authorisation issues and reactions (2010–2011) ====
In the summer of 2010, Ioannis Takis took charge as the new chairman of the club, while Antonis Remos continued having the ownership of Iraklis Thessaloniki. On 1 June 2010, the club was denied a license to compete in next season's Greek Super League. That summer, Iraklis's fans rallied in Thessaloniki for more than 10 days. Also there were 2 rallies in Athens and other important places in Greece like Malgara and Tempi. Finally, on 25 June, Iraklis received permission to play in Greek Super League for the 2010–11 season.

On 4 May 2011, Iraklis were relegated to Football League after failing to obtain a license to participate in 2011–12 Super League. On 19 May 2011, the Disciplinary Committee of the competition found Iraklis guilty of forgery during the winter transfer window. Therefore, the club was automatically placed in the last position. That is a unique case as Iraklis have never finished in a relegation spot but have been relegated twice. On 26 September, however, the Professional Sports Committee stripped Iraklis from its professional licence and demoted it to Delta Ethniki. The team competed in Delta Ethniki under the ownership of G.S. Iraklis Thessalonikis, until the G.S. Iraklis Thessalonikis General Assembly decided to disband it in favour of a merging deal with M.A.E. Pontion Katerinis to form A.E.P. Iraklis 1908 in 2012.

=== A.E.P. Iraklis 1908 P.A.E. ===
Ιn August 2012, Iraklis was incorporated as A.E.P. Iraklis 1908. The new merged club has no legal connection to the original club of G.S. Iraklis Thessalonikis, but is essentially considered as a direct continuation of it. Therefore, G.S. Iraklis Thessalonikis has no shares of the new company, but instead still holds the 10% of the bankrupt original company of Iraklis Thessalonikis P.A.E., which remains to be dissolved. Currently, M.A.E. Pontion Katerinis own 10% of the new merged club, as required by the Greek sports law, the club's chairman Theodoros Papadopoulos and team fans own the rest, with the chairman possessing a relative majority.

==== Spyros Papathanasakis era (2014–2017) ====
In the summer of 2014 and after several months of negotiations Spyros Papathanasakis became the new major shareholder of the club holds the 99% of shares. In the 2014–15 season, Iraklis promoted easily from Football League to the Super League after finishing in the first place during the regular season and second in the playoffs only behind AEK Athens. In the 2015–16 season, Iraklis finished in the 12th position to secure Super League status.

Two years later, despite successfully retaining Super League status for the 2016–17 season once again by finishing 12th the team was again relegated to gamma ethniki (third tier) while the financial situation of the club was again under severe deterioration. This urged Spyros Papathanasakis, on 7 September 2017, to declare Iraklis inability to satisfy financial obligations, causing the club to be disbanded for the second time in five years. Spyros Papathanasakis stepped down as owner and chairman of Iraklis. For this reason, a brand new committee with Nikos Vafeiadis as its chairman was made by Iraklis's Legends and fans to save the club.

Despite starting the 2017–18 season with only 14 players Nikos Vafeiadis and the rest of the brand new committee brought lots of players who quickly helped Iraklis to climb the rankings and play high quality football. After a successful season, Iraklis finished top of the table in group 2. This obtained the club a Playoff spot. In the Playoffs Iraklis managed to finish 1st and gain promotion to Football League.

=== A.E.P. Iraklis 1908 Nea P.A.E. ===
==== Tom Papadopoulos era (2018–2019) ====
In the summer of 2018, negotiations began on the purchase of the football section of Iraklis Thessaloniki by the Greek–American businessman Tom Papadopoulos, who is involved in the processing and marketing of marble in the United States of America. On 27 September 2018, Professional Sports Committee announced that Tom Papadopoulos is the new major shareholder of Iraklis Thessaloniki and today 90% of its shares are its own, since it has already given €300,000 for the share capital of the new company set up a few days ago.

== Sponsorship ==
Period	Title sponsor	Grand sponsor	Kit manufacturer	Source
2024–25	Venetis Bakeries		Lotto Sport Italia	
2025–28	Venetis Bakeries	Betsson	Erima	

== Facilities ==
=== Stadium ===
The first ground of the team was placed in the centre of Thessaloniki, nearby the White Tower. Its construction was funded by the members of G.S. Iraklis Thessaloniki, but, after Thessaloniki became a part of Greece, the club was ousted from its owned ground, so a park could be created in its place. In 1915, Iraklis rented an area in the centre of Thessaloniki for a ten years period, but the club was unable to use its facilities until 1919, due to World War I. In 1927 the club renewed the contract for the use of the area, but in 1930, the newly founded Aristotle University of Thessaloniki tried to take the ownership of the field. For almost two decades the ground was used by both the athletes of Iraklis and the students of the university, until in the 1950s the university managed to get the ownership of the ground, so it could demolish it to construct a square, that is nowadays known as Platia Chimiou.

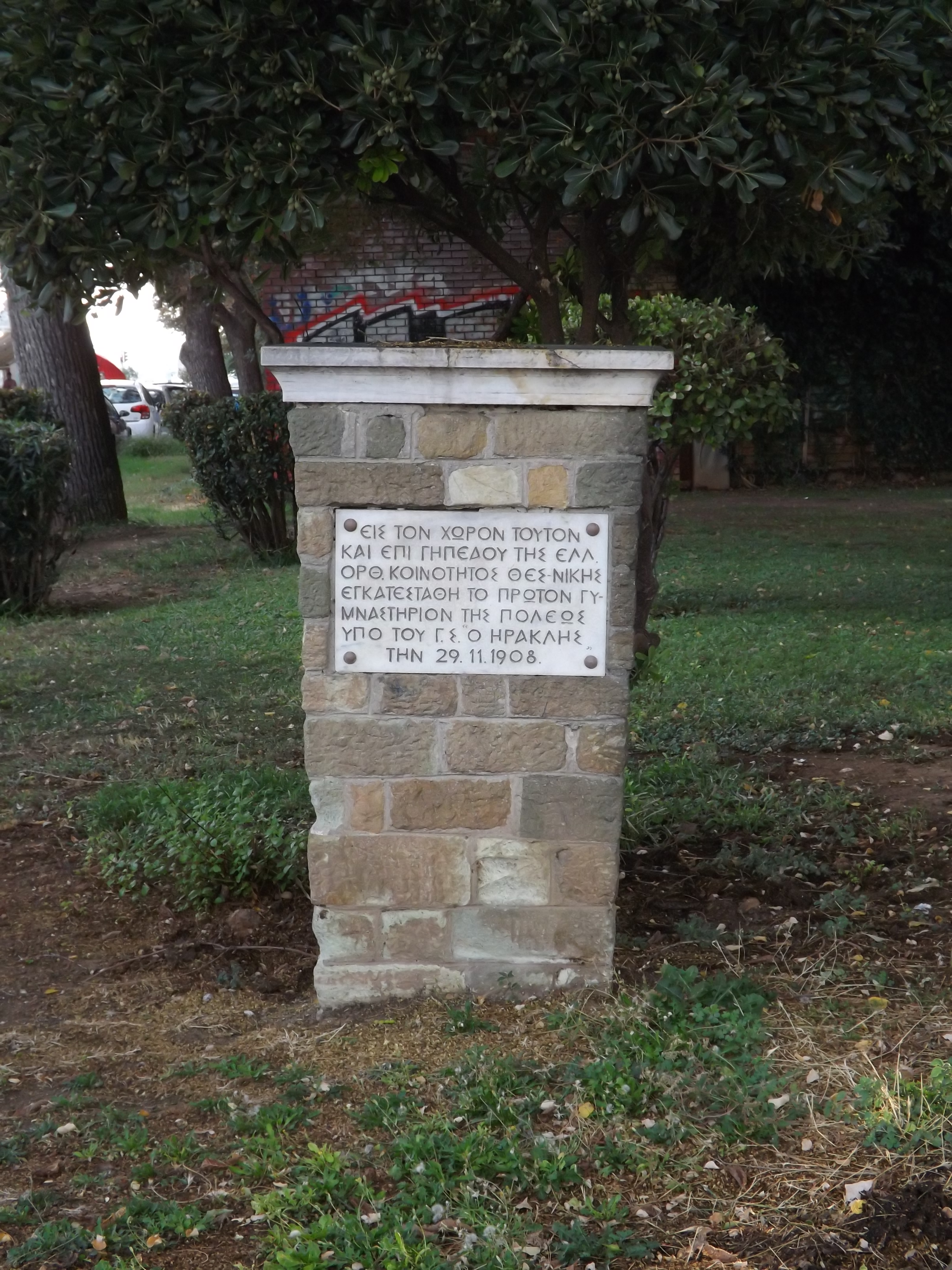
Commemorative plaque for Iraklis Thessaloniki first ground near White Tower of Thessaloniki.

On 6 November 1960 Iraklis played its first match in Kaftanzoglio Stadium, to record a 2–1 win against M.G.S.S. Thermaikos Thessalonikis. Kaftanzoglio has been the home ground of Iraklis ever since, including the 2011–12 season, when both the G.S. Iraklis Thessaloniki and the A.E.P. Iraklis team used it as their home ground. In the 2002–03 and 2003–04 seasons Iraklis used Makedonikos Stadium as its home ground. That decision was made due to the renovation of Kaftanzoglio for the 2004 Summer Olympics. Iraklis also owns a football ground and training facilities in the, adjacent to Kaftanzoglio Stadium, Chortatzides area, where the juveniles of the club train. There were plans for Iraklis to construct a new 22,000-seat stadium, in a club owned area in the eastern extremities of the city, in Mikra.

=== Training center ===
Mikra Training Center locates in the area of Mikra, Kalamaria and is the owned training ground of Iraklis Thessaloniki. The training facilities include 3 football fields, gym, sauna, water pool, such as the administration building. In the area, the club's new stadium also was planned to be built.

== Supporters ==
Iraklis Thessaloniki was well supported right from the start of its establishment. Even though the football section wasn't the most popular among club loyals in the very first years, it soon became the "flagship" of the sports club, as football became more and more popular. In the 1970s and 1980s, the club attracted crowds of around 10.000 people, to reach a peak in the 1983–84 season with an average attendance of 16,559. In the 1990s, following Vasilis Hatzipanagis retirement and the general fall in attendances in Greek football, crowds in Kaftanzoglio deteriorated to a modest average of 5,000. A record low attendance was recorded during the 1990s, as in a match against Paniliakos there were only 384 tickets sold.

A brief increase in attendance was recorded after the purchase of the club by Evangelos Mytilineos, reaching a peak in the 2001–02 season with an average of 6,790. On 24 January 1971 Iraklis Thessaloniki set the highest attendance record for any football match in Alpha Ethniki, with 45,634 tickets sold in the club's contest against Panathinaikos. In the 1987 Greek Cup final a crowd of 17,000 Iraklis Thessaloniki fans travelled to Athens, to watch Iraklis Thessaloniki lose in penalties against OFI. In two recent opinion polls Iraklis Thessaloniki was ranked as the 6th most popular football club in Greece, gathering 2.8%–3.7% of the participating football supporters.

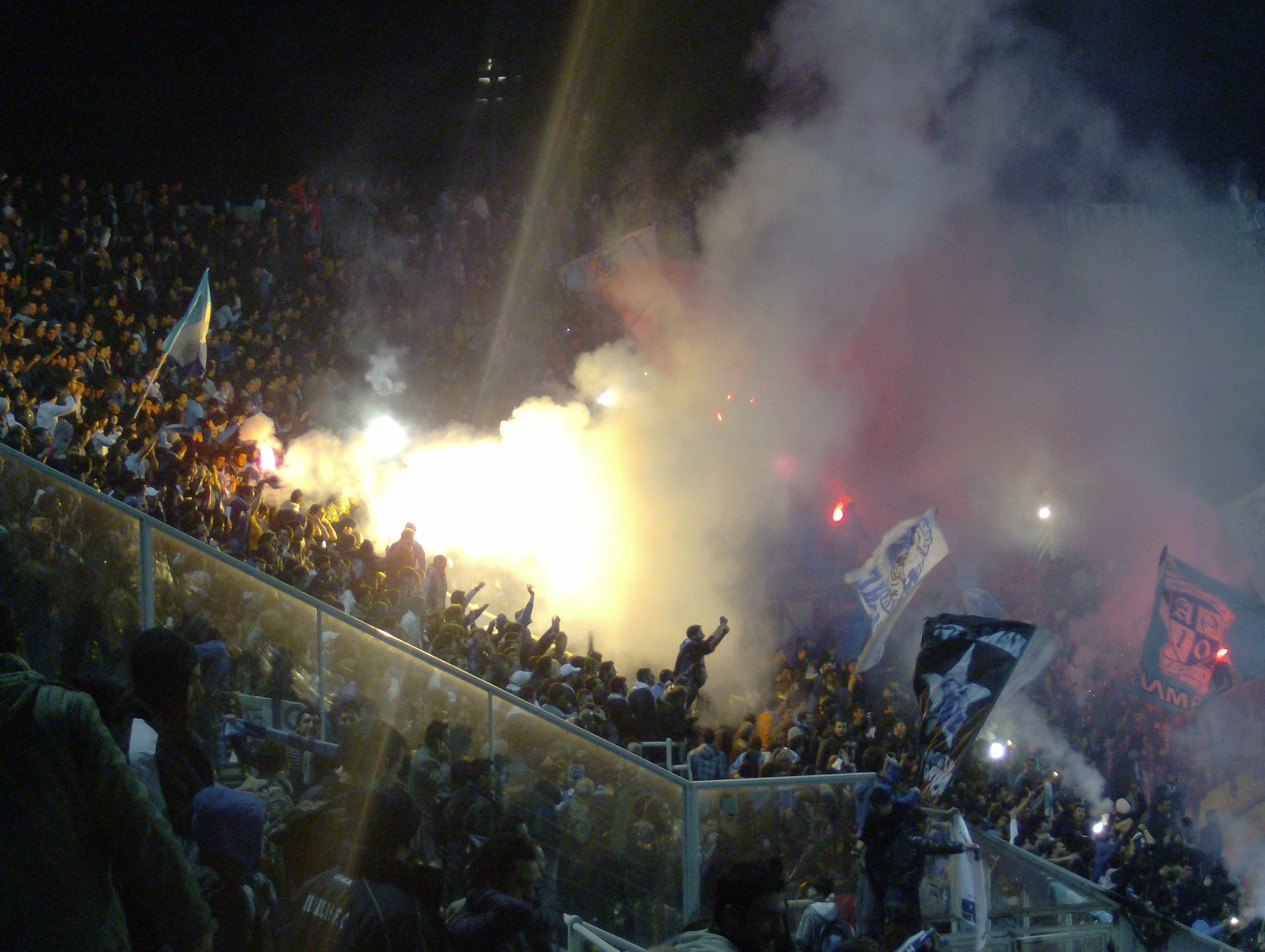
Iraklis supporters in Gate 10 of Kaftanzoglio Stadium.

The most prominent supporters club of Iraklis Thessaloniki is Aftonomi Thira 10 (meaning Autonomous Gate 10), a fan club with a total of 15 branches in Northern Greece. The fan club is known for holding an antiracist stance, as it participates in the Ultras Antiracist Festival. Other activities of the fan club include the publication of a magazine and the conduct of an annual festival. Other minor supporters' clubs are SFISE, Blue Boys, A.P.A.T.S.I. and Iraklis Fan Club of Athens.

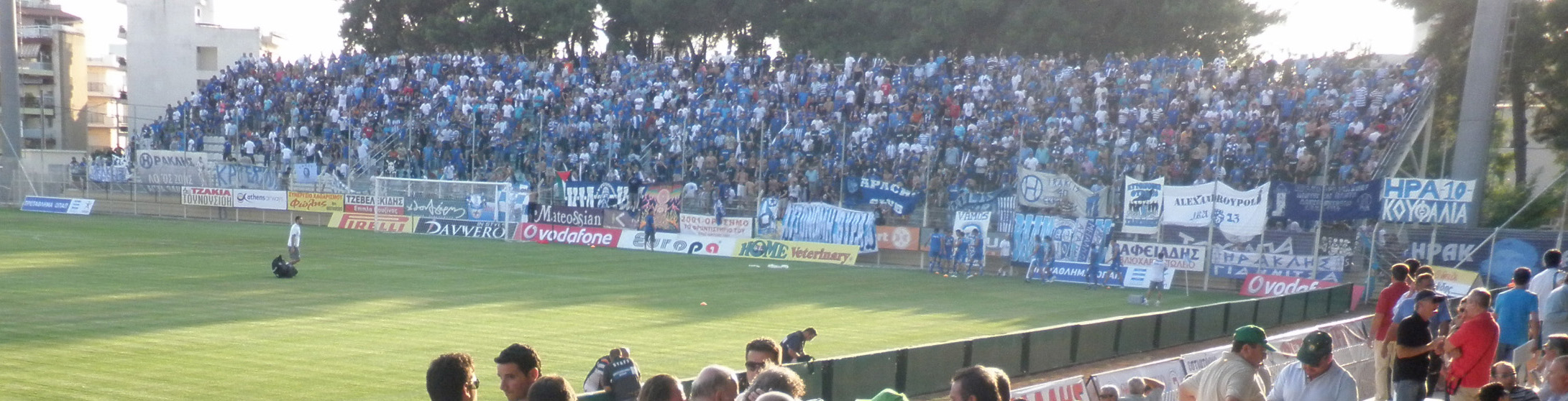
Iraklis supporters during an away match.

Iraklis Thessaloniki supporters hold ties with the supporters of Mainz, Rayo Vallecano, Zemun and Buducnost Podgorica as those have shown their support during Iraklis Thessaloniki supporters rallies against Super League's refusal to grant Iraklis Thessaloniki a license to participate in Super League for the 2011–12 season.

Also, the fans have sympathy for all the clubs named "Heracles" worldwide, most notably the Spanish Hércules. Since 2003, fans of both teams formed a friendship through the internet. There is even a Hércules supporters club that bears the name "Iraklis", in honor of their friendship.

== Crest and colours ==
=== Crests ===
Iraklis's crest has changed through times. The crest of the parent multi–sport club G.S. Iraklis Thessalonikis depicts the demigod Heracles in a moment of rest leaning on his gnarled club, a scene inspired by the statue of Farnese Hercules, itself a copy of a statue crafted by Lysippos in the 4th century BC. The club logo is a capital letter "Η" (Eta), the first letter of the name "Iraklís" (Greek: Ηρακλής, lit. 'Heracles') in greek language, surrounded by a circle. During the 2008–09 season the club used a special logo, created especially for its centenary.

==== G.S. Iraklis Thessalonikis ====
Crest (1908–1986, 1988–1990, 1995–1997)

Crest (1997–2000)

Crest (2005–2008, 2009–2011)

Crest (2008–2009)

==== P.O.T. Iraklis ====
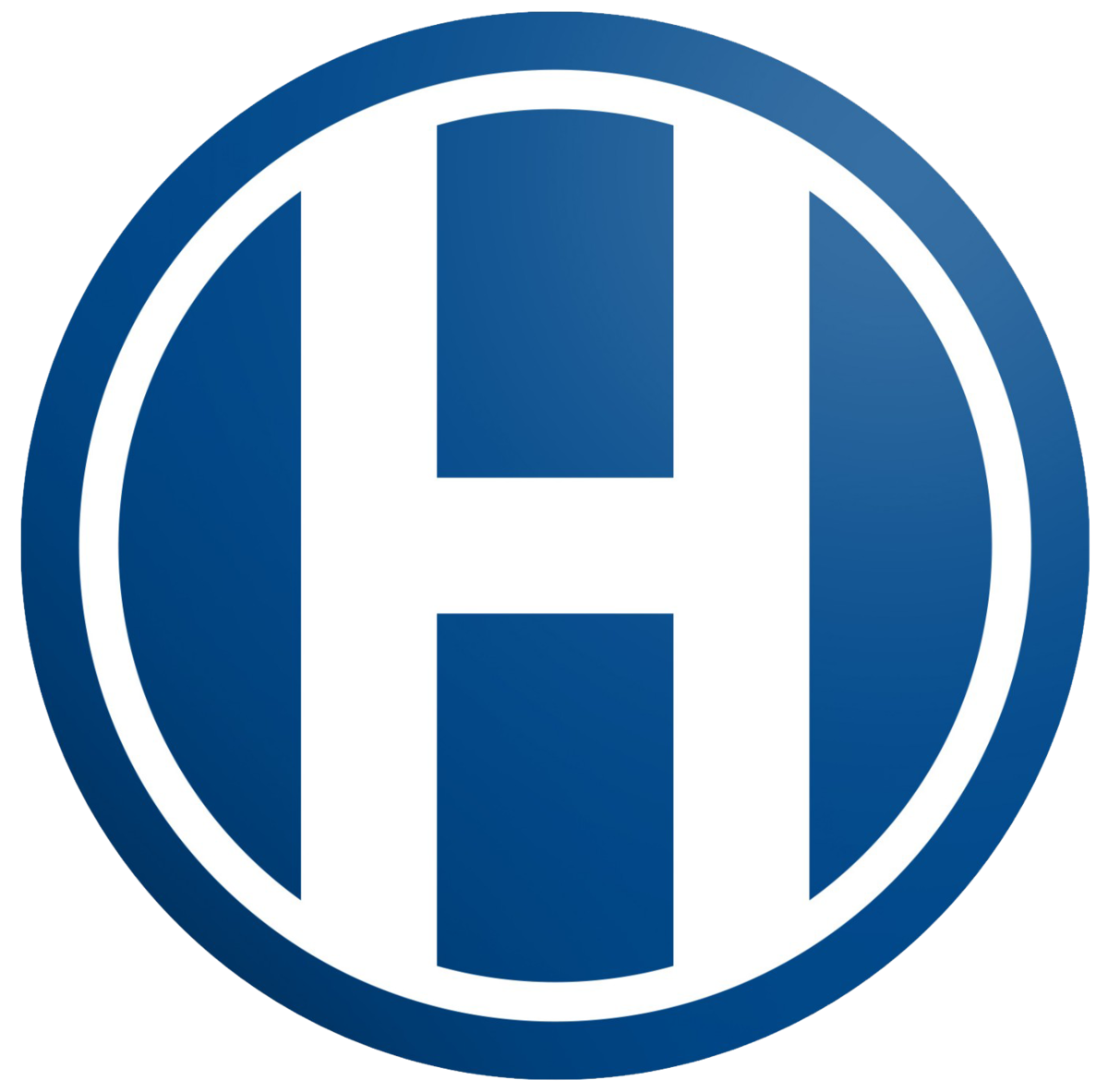
Crest (2021–2024)

Crest (2024–)

=== Colours ===
Throughout the entire club's history, its colours are blue or cyan and white to resemble the colours of the flag of Greece given the fact that G.S. Iraklis Thessalonikis was established while Thessaloniki was a part of the Ottoman Empire. The team is so known in Greece as "Kianolefkoi" (Greek: Κυανόλευκοι, lit. 'Cyan-Whites'). Iraklis away colours were usually either white or orange. Traditionally, the Iraklis kit is blue and white stripes but through the years this was changed often to all blue, all white, chess-like, and hooped, among others.

== Kit evolution ==
=== G.S. Iraklis Thessalonikis ===
==== Home kit ====
1983–84	1984–85	1999–2000

==== Away kit ====
1984–85

=== A.E.P. Iraklis 1908 ===
==== Home kit ====
2012–13	2014–15	2015–16	2018–19

==== Away kit ====
2012–13	2015–16

=== P.O.T. Iraklis ===
==== Home kit ====
2021–22	2022–23	2023–24	2024–26	2026–27

==== Away kit ====
2024–25	2025–26	2026–27

==== Third kit ====
2024–25	2025–26

== Personnel ==
As of 19 October 2026

=== Board of directors ===
Office	Nationality	Staff	Source
President	(Greece)	Panagiotis Monemvasiotis	
Chief executive officer	(Greece)	Panagiotis Monemvasiotis	
1st Vice president	(Greece)	Aristotelis Perrakis	
2nd Vice president	(Greece)	Elli Perraki	
3rd Vice president	(Greece)	Dimitrios Anastasiadis	
Members	(Greece)	Michael Mandalis	

=== Management ===
Office	Nationality	Staff	Source
Owner	(Greece)	Panagiotis Monemvasiotis	
Management consultant for competitive affairs	(Greece)	Giannis Kontis	
Commercial director	(Greece)	Dimitris Schetakis	
Team manager	(Greece)	Ieroklis Stoltidis	
Youth academy sporting directors	(Greece)	Nikos Pourtoulidis	
Youth academy sporting directors	(Greece)	Giannis Papapostolou	

=== Coaching staff ===
Office	Nationality	Staff	Source
Head coach	(Italy)	Walter Mazzarri	
Assistant coaches	(Italy)	Eugenio Sena	
Assistant coaches	(Italy)	Franco Brunetti	
Goalkeeper coach	(Greece)	Ilias Vouras	
Fitness coach	(Italy)	Corrado Saccone	
Rehabilitation trainer	(Greece)	Michalis Thalassinos	

=== Medical staff ===
Office	Nationality	Staff	Source
Doctors	(Greece)	Andreas Piskopakis	
Doctors	(Greece)	Dimitris Argirakis	
Physiotherapists	(Greece)	Paris Dimitriou	
Physiotherapists	(Greece)	Vaggelis Paspalis	
Physiotherapists	(Greece)	Kostas Georgopoulos	

=== Backroom staff ===
Office	Nationality	Staff	Source
Kitmen	(Greece)	Giorgos Siagas	
Kitmen	(Greece)	Nikos Tsakalidis	

== Players ==
As of 26 October 2026

=== Current squad ===
Note: Flags indicate national team as defined under FIFA eligibility rules; some limited exceptions apply. Players may hold more than one non-FIFA nationality.

No.	Pos.	Nation	Player
1	GK	GRE	Georgios Karakasidis
2	DF	GRE	Praxitelis Vouros
3	DF	BRA	Vitor Meer (on loan from APOEL)
4	DF	MAR	Sofian Chakla (vice–captain)
5	MF	GRE	Orestis Tsintonis
6	MF	ESP	Carlos Rodríguez
7	FW	BIH	Elvir Koljić
8	MF	SRB	Nemanja Radoja
9	FW	ALB	Kristian Kushta (captain)
10	MF	PAN	Yoel Bárcenas
11	FW	ESP	Ivi López
12	MF	POR	Xande Silva
14	MF	SVK	Jakub Hromada
16	GK	GRE	Panagiotis Tsintotas
17	MF	GRE	Nikos Anastasiadis

No.	Pos.	Nation	Player
18	DF	BEL	Rob Nizet
20	MF	GRE	Panagiotis Panagiotidis
21	DF	ESP	Íñigo Piña
22	MF	FRA	Kylian Kaïboué
23	DF	ESP	Dani Muñoz
27	MF	AUT	Marco Krainz
30	DF	ESP	Carles Soria
31	DF	GBS	Nanu
33	GK	GRE	Georgios Athanasiadis
43	FW	POR	Pedro Marques
44	DF	DEN	Rasmus Lauritsen
69	DF	BEN	Yohan Roche
90	MF	GRE	Vasilios Sourlis
94	DF	GRE	Georgios Giannoutsos
97	FW	SVK	Adam Žulevič (on loan from Genoa U20)

=== Out on loan ===
Note: Flags indicate national team as defined under FIFA eligibility rules; some limited exceptions apply. Players may hold more than one non-FIFA nationality.

No.	Pos.	Nation	Player
—	MF	GRE	Efstratios Tachmetzidis (at Iraklis Thermaikos until 30 June 2027)
—	FW	GRE	Ilias Moysidis (at Panserraikos until 30 June 2027)

== Domestic competitions ==
=== Leagues ===
Season	Tier	League	Position
G.S. Iraklis Thessalonikis
1959–60	1	First National Division	9th
1960–61	1	First National Division	8th
1961–62	1	First National Division	9th
1962–63	1	First National Division	6th
1963–64	1	First National Division	12th
1964–65	1	First National Division	11th
1965–66	1	First National Division	12th
1966–67	1	First National Division	9th
1967–68	1	First National Division	13th
1968–69	1	First National Division	11th
1969–70	1	First National Division	6th
1970–71	1	First National Division	5th
1971–72	1	First National Division	9th
1972–73	1	First National Division	8th
1973–74	1	First National Division	7th
1974–75	1	First National Division	8th
1975–76	1	First National Division	8th
1976–77	1	First National Division	12th
1977–78	1	First National Division	9th
1978–79	1	First National Division	6th
1979–80	1	First National Division	8th^{1}
1980–81	2	Second National Division (North Group)	1st
1981–82	1	First National Division	6th
1982–83	1	First National Division	8th
1983–84	1	First National Division	3rd
1984–85	1	First National Division	5th
1985–86	1	First National Division	4th
1986–87	1	First National Division	6th
1987–88	1	First National Division	6th
1988–89	1	First National Division	4th
1989–90	1	First National Division	5th
1990–91	1	First National Division	5th
1991–92	1	First National Division	9th
1992–93	1	First National Division	6th
1993–94	1	First National Division	6th
1994–95	1	First National Division	6th
1995–96	1	First National Division	4th
1996–97	1	First National Division	13th
1997–98	1	First National Division	6th
1998–99	1	First National Division	9th
1999–00	1	First National Division	6th
2000–01	1	Superior Division	5th
2001–02	1	First National Division	6th
2002–03	1	First National Division	7th
2003–04	1	First National Division	8th
2004–05	1	First National Division	7th
2005–06	1	First National Division	4th
2006–07	1	Super League	13th
2007–08	1	Super League	10th
2008–09	1	Super League	10th
2009–10	1	Super League	10th
2010–11	1	Super League	11th^{2}
2011–12	4	Fourth National Division (Group 2)	15th^{3}
A.E.P. Iraklis 1908
2011–12	3	Football League 2 (North Group)	5th^{4}
2012–13	2	Football League	5th
2013–14	2	Football League (North Group)	4th
2014–15	2	Football League (North Group)	1st
2015–16	1	Super League	12th
2016–17	1	Super League	12th
2017–18	3	Third National Division (Group 2)	1st
2018–19	2	Football League	11th^{5}
A.S. Iraklis 2015
2019–20	8	Macedonia F.C.A. Third Division (Group 3)	1st^{6}
A.S. Iraklis Ampelokipon
2020–21	4	Third National Division (Group 1)	2nd^{7}
P.O.T. Iraklis
2021–22	2	Super League 2 (North Group)	7th^{8}
2022–23	2	Super League 2 (North Group)	5th
2023–24	2	Super League 2 (North Group)	7th
2024–25	2	Super League 2 (North Group)	2nd
2025–26	2	Super League 2 (North Group)	1st
2026–27	1	Super League 1	

==== Notes ====
- ^{1} Demoted to Second National Division due to a match fixing scandal in a cup game against PAOK.
- ^{2} Demoted to Fourth National Division because the Professional Sports Committee stripped the club from its professional licence.
- ^{3} G.S. Iraklis Thessalonikis stopped competing in Fourth National Division after being fully merged into A.E.P. Iraklis 1908.
- ^{4} Participated in Football League 2 as phoenix club A.E.P. Iraklis 1908.
- ^{5} Demoted to Football League due to restructuring of national championships and demoted to Third Division Macedonia F.C.A. due to its financial state.
- ^{6} Participated in regional last-tier Macedonia F.C.A. Third Division as phoenix club A.S. Iraklis 2015. It was promoted to Macedonia F.C.A. Second Division, before the COVID-19 pandemic forced the Macedonia F.C.A. to suspend all its championships.
- ^{7} Participated in Third National Division as phoenix club A.S. Iraklis Ampelokipon.
- ^{8} Participated in Super League 2 as phoenix club P.O.T. Iraklis.

==== Key ====
Best positioning in first division
Worst positioning in first division
Promoted to first division
Promoted to second division
Demoted to second division
Demoted to third division
Demoted to fourth division

=== Leagues record ===
League	Tier	Seasons	Pld	W	D	L	GF	GA	GD
G.S. Iraklis Thessalonikis
First National Division / Superior Division / Super League	1	51	1,626	609	447	570	2,047	1,941	+106
Second National Division	2	1	38	26	6	6	99	22	+77
Fourth National Division	4	1	26	1	3	22	3	65	-62
Total		53	1,690	636	456	598	2,149	2,028	+121
A.E.P. Iraklis 1908
Super League	1	2	60	14	22	24	52	71	-19
Football League	2	4	150	74	39	37	174	105	+69
Football League 2 / Third National Division	3	2	50	32	13	5	98	30	+68
Total		8	260	120	74	66	324	206	+118
A.S. Iraklis 2015
Macedonia F.C.A. Third Division	8	1	15	15	0	0	88	6	+82
A.S. Iraklis Ampelokipon
Third National Division	4	1	15	10	3	2	32	7	+25
P.O.T. Iraklis
Super League 1	1	1							
Super League 2	2	5	142	70	49	23	234	114	+120

== European competitions ==
=== Match table ===
Season	Competition	Round	Opponent	Home	Away	Source
1961–62	Inter-Cities Fairs Cup	1st Round	bye			
1961–62	Inter-Cities Fairs Cup	2nd Round	(Socialist Federal Republic of Yugoslavia) Novi Sad XI	2–1	1–9	
1963–64	Inter-Cities Fairs Cup	1st Round	(Spain) Real Zaragoza	0–3	1–6	
1976–77	European Cup Winners' Cup	1st Round	(Cyprus) APOEL	0–0	0–2	
1984–85	Balkans Cup	Quarter-finals	(Turkey) Galatasaray	5–1	0–1	
1984–85	Balkans Cup	Semi-finals	(Turkey) Ankaragücü	1–0	0–1 (4–2 p)	
1984–85	Balkans Cup	Finals	(Romania) Argeș Pitești	4–1	1–3	
1986	Balkans Cup	Quarter-finals	(Romania) Târgu Mureș	4–1	2–4	
1986	Balkans Cup	Semi-finals	(Bulgaria) Slavia Sofia	w/o		
1987–88	Balkans Cup	Group Stage (Group B)	(Bulgaria) Sliven	2–3	0–4	
1987–88	Balkans Cup	Group Stage (Group B)	(Turkey) Samsunspor	4–3	1–6	
1989–90	UEFA Cup	1st Round	(Switzerland) Sion	1–0	0–2	
1990–91	UEFA Cup	1st Round	(Spain) Valencia	0–0	0–2 (a.e.t.)	
1993	Intertoto Cup	Group Stage (Group 8)	(Switzerland) Aarau		0–1	
1993	Intertoto Cup	Group Stage (Group 8)	(Austria) Wiener		2–4	
1993	Intertoto Cup	Group Stage (Group 8)	(Israel) Beitar Jerusalem	2–1		
1993	Intertoto Cup	Group Stage (Group 8)	(Germany) Dynamo Dresden		1–1	
1995	UEFA Intertoto Cup	Group Stage (Group 12)	(Austria) Vorwärts Steyr		0–3	
1995	UEFA Intertoto Cup	Group Stage (Group 12)	(Bulgaria) Spartak Plovdiv	0–0		
1995	UEFA Intertoto Cup	Group Stage (Group 12)	(Germany) Eintracht Frankfurt		1–5	
1995	UEFA Intertoto Cup	Group Stage (Group 12)	(Lithuania) Panerys Vilnius	3–1		
1996–97	UEFA Cup	Qualifying Round	(Cyprus) APOEL	0–1	1–2	
1997	UEFA Intertoto Cup	Group Stage (Group 12)	(Austria) Ried		1–3	
1997	UEFA Intertoto Cup	Group Stage (Group 12)	(Georgia (country)) Merani Tbilisi	2–0		
1997	UEFA Intertoto Cup	Group Stage (Group 12)	(Russia) Torpedo Moscow		1–4	
1997	UEFA Intertoto Cup	Group Stage (Group 12)	(Malta) Floriana	1–0		
1998	UEFA Intertoto Cup	2nd Round	(Romania) Național București	3–1	0–3	
2000–01	UEFA Cup	1st Round	(France) Gueugnon	1–0	0–0	
2000–01	UEFA Cup	2nd Round	(Germany) Kaiserslautern	1–3	3–2	
2002–03	UEFA Cup	1st Round	(Cyprus) Anorthosis Famagusta	4–2	1–3 (a)	
2006–07	UEFA Cup	1st Round	(Poland) Wisła Kraków	0–2 (a.e.t.)	1–0	

=== European competitions record ===
Competition	Seasons	Pld	W	D	L	GF	GA	GD
UEFA Cup	6	14	5	2	7	13	19	-6
European Cup Winners' Cup	1	2	0	1	1	0	2	-2
Intertoto Cup / UEFA Intertoto Cup	4	12	4	2	6	14	23	-9
Inter-Cities Fairs Cup	2	4	1	0	3	4	19	-15
Balkans Cup	3	12	5	0	7	24	28	-4
Total	16	44	15	5	24	55	91	-36

== Notable former players ==
=== League top scorers ===
Nationality	Player	Goals
(Greece)	Dimitrios Gesios	74
(Cyprus)	Michalis Konstantinou	64
(Greece)	Daniil Papadopoulos	64
(Greece)	Fanis Toutziaris	62
(Greece)	Vasilis Hatzipanagis	61

=== Most league appearances ===
Nationality	Player	Matches
(Greece)	Daniil Papadopoulos	419
(Greece)	Makis Sentelidis	312
(Greece)	Charalampos Xanthopoulos	283
(Greece)	Vasilis Hatzipanagis	281
(Greece)	Zacharias Chaliabalias	280

=== Greek Golden Player – UEFA Jubilee Awards ===
Nationality	Player
(Greece)	Vasilis Hatzipanagis

=== Top foreign league goalscorer === : Nationality / Player / Goals; (Cyprus) / Michalis Konstantinou / 64	=== Foreigner leading in league appearances === : Nationality / Player / Appearances; (Serbia) (Greece) / Ivan Jovanović / 271

== Managerial history ==
Years	Nationality	Name	Notes
G.S. Iraklis Thessalonikis
1926–1927	(Hungary)	József Schweng	
1959–1960	(Greece)	Panos Markovic	
1960	(Greece)	Iakovos Magoulas	Caretaker
1960–1961	(Socialist Federal Republic of Yugoslavia)	Aleksandar Tomašević	
1961–1962	(Greece)	Panos Markovic	
1962	(Socialist Federal Republic of Yugoslavia)	Bozidar Pajević	
1962–1963	(Austria)	Theodor Brinek Jr.	
1963	(Socialist Federal Republic of Yugoslavia)	Josip Takač	
1963–1964	(Greece)	Adam Pitsoudis	
1964	(Hungary)	Gyula Lázár	
1964–1965	(Socialist Federal Republic of Yugoslavia)	Ratomir Čabrić	
1965	(Greece)	Giorgos Chatzigiannidis	Caretaker
1965	(Socialist Federal Republic of Yugoslavia)	Bozidar Pajević	
1965–1966	(Socialist Federal Republic of Yugoslavia)	Slavko Milošević	
1966–1967	(Socialist Federal Republic of Yugoslavia)	Bozidar Pajević	
1967–1968	(Greece)	Kostas Karapatis	
1968–1969	(Socialist Federal Republic of Yugoslavia)	Dragoslav Pivić	
1969–1971	(Socialist Federal Republic of Yugoslavia)	Ljubiša Spajić	
1971–1972	(Greece)	Lakis Petropoulos	
1972–1974	(England)	Jack Mansell	
1974	(Greece)	Thomas Zachariadis	Caretaker
1974–1975	(Socialist Federal Republic of Yugoslavia)	Ljubiša Spajić	
1975	(Greece)	Giorgos Chatzigiannidis	Caretaker
1975–1976	(England)	Les Shannon	
1976	(Greece)	Theofilos Kourtidis	Caretaker
1976	(Socialist Federal Republic of Yugoslavia)	Milovan Ćirić	
1976	(Greece)	Theofilos Kourtidis	Caretaker
1976–1977	(Socialist Federal Republic of Yugoslavia)	Milan Ribar	
1977	(Greece)	Michalis Bellis	
1977–1978	(Greece)	Kostas Karapatis	
1978	(Greece)	Vassilis Papathanasiou	Caretaker
1978–1979	(Poland)	Antoni Brzeżańczyk	
1979–1980	(Greece)	Michalis Bellis	
1980	(Greece)	Kostas Karapatis	
1980–1981	(Greece)	Aristotelis Batakis	
1981–1983	(Bulgaria)	Apostol Chachevski	
1983	(Greece)	Aristotelis Batakis	Caretaker
1983–1984	(West Germany)	Friedel Rausch	
1984–1985	(Greece)	Aristotelis Batakis	
1985	(Poland)	Jerzy Kopa	
1985–1986	(Greece)	Nikos Alefantos	
1986–1987	(West Germany)	Diethelm Ferner	
1987	(Greece)	Christos Archontidis	
1987	(Greece)	Kostas Aidiniou; Giorgos Koudas	
1987	(Greece)	Grigoris Fanaras	Caretaker
1987–1988	(Greece)	Nikos Alefantos	
1988	(Greece)	Grigoris Fanaras	Caretaker
1988–1990	(Sweden)	Agne Simonsson	
1990–1991	(Greece)	Aristotelis Batakis	
1991	(Greece)	Vassilis Lioftis	Caretaker
1991–1994	(Netherlands)	Thijs Libregts	
1994–1996	(Serbia and Montenegro)	Dušan Mitošević	
1996	(Greece)	Vasilios Antoniadis	
1996–1997	(Greece)	Alketas Panagoulias	
1997	(Greece)	Manolis Giovanopoulos	Caretaker
1997–1998	(Greece)	Georgios Paraschos	
1998	(Greece)	Kostas Maloumidis	
1998	(North Macedonia)	Kiril Dojčinovski	
1998–1999	(Sweden)	Mats Jingblad	
1999–2000	(Greece)	Angelos Anastasiadis	
2000–2001	(Greece)	Giannis Kyrastas	
2001–2002	(Greece)	Angelos Anastasiadis	
2002	(Serbia and Montenegro) (Greece)	Ivan Jovanovic	
2002–2003	(Netherlands) (Greece)	Eugène Gerards	
2003	(Greece)	Giorgos Karaiskos	Caretaker
2003–2004	(Sweden)	Mats Jingblad	
2004	(Greece)	Giorgos Karaiskos	Caretaker
2004	(Uruguay) (Armenia)	Sergio Markarián	
2004–2006	(Greece)	Savvas Kofidis	
2006	(Greece)	Thodoris Eleftheriadis	Caretaker
2006–2007	(Slovakia)	Jozef Bubenko	
2007	(Serbia) (Greece)	Ivan Jovanovic	
2007	(Greece)	Giannis Tzifopoulos	Caretaker
2007–2008	(Spain)	Ángel Pedraza	
2008	(Spain)	Rodolfo Borrell	
2008–2009	(Greece)	Makis Katsavakis	
2009	(Greece)	Christos Zifkas	
2009	(Ukraine) (Greece)	Oleh Protasov	
2009–2010	(Greece)	Savvas Kofidis	
2010	(Slovakia)	Jozef Bubenko	
2010–2011	(Greece)	Marinos Ouzounidis	
2011	(Greece)	Georgios Paraschos	
2011	(Greece)	Vassilis Spirogiannis	
2011–2012	(Greece)	Fotis Gizelis	
A.E.P. Iraklis 1908
2012	(Greece)	Leonidas Bilis	
2012	(Greece)	Soulis Papadopoulos	
2012–2013	(Greece)	Georgios Strantzalis	
2013	(Greece)	Nikos Theodosiadis	Caretaker
2013	(Greece)	Giannis Chatzinikolaou	
2013	(Serbia) (Cyprus)	Siniša Gogić	
2013	(Greece)	Giorgos Karaiskos	Caretaker
2013–2014	(Argentina) (Spain)	Guillermo Hoyos	
2014–2016	(Greece)	Nikos Papadopoulos	
2016	(Greece)	Ioannis Amanatidis	Caretaker
2016–2017	(Greece)	Savvas Pantelidis	
2017	(Slovenia)	Miloš Kostić	
2017–2018	(Greece)	Sakis Anastasiadis	
2018	(Greece)	Spyros Baxevanos	
2018	(Greece)	Alekos Vosniadis	
2018	(Greece)	Dimitrios Eleftheropoulos	
2018	(Greece)	Anastasios Katsabis	Caretaker
2018–2019	(Spain)	José Manuel Roca	
2019	(Brazil) (Italy)	Marcello Troisi	
A.S. Iraklis 2015
2019–2020	(Greece)	Margaritis Kechagias	
A.S. Iraklis Ampelokipon
2020	(Greece)	Giorgos Akritopoulos	
2020–2021	(Greece)	Spyros Baxevanos	
2021	(Greece)	Thalis Theodoridis	
P.O.T. Iraklis
2021–2022	(Greece)	Konstantinos Georgiadis	
2022	(Greece)	Anastasios Katsabis	Caretaker
2022–2023	(Greece)	Sakis Tsiolis	
2023	(Greece)	Thanos Kourtoglou	Caretaker
2023–2024	(Greece)	Periklis Amanatidis	
2024	(Greece)	Soulis Papadopoulos	
2024	(Greece)	Lefteris Velentzas	Caretaker
2024	(Greece)	Sokratis Ofrydopoulos	
2024	(Greece)	Thanasis Staikos	
2024	(Greece)	Ieroklis Stoltidis	Caretaker
2024–2025	(Greece)	Pavlos Dermitzakis	
2025	(Greece)	Babis Tennes	
2025	(Greece)	Dimitrios Spanos	
2025	(Greece)	Ieroklis Stoltidis	Caretaker
2025–2026	(Serbia)	Nebojša Vignjević	
2026	(Greece)	Giorgos Petrakis	
2026–	(Italy)	Walter Mazzarri	

== Records and statistics ==
=== Records ===
- Biggest win:
  - 14–1 v Enosi Charilaou, 1959–60 Greek Cup
  - 13–0 v Odysseas Kordelio, 1955–56 Greek Cup
- Biggest away win:
  - 1–8 v Apollon Krya Vrysi, 1993–94 Greek Cup
- Biggest league win:
  - 12–0 v Edessaikos, 1980–81 Beta Ethniki
- Biggest top tier win
  - 8–1 v AEK Athens, 1930–31 Panhellenic Championship
  - 8–1 v Rodos, 1978–79 Alpha Ethniki

=== Highest attendances ===
Date	Stadium	Opponent	Attendance	Source
24 January 1971	Kaftanzoglio Stadium	Panathinaikos	45,634	
12 February 1984	Kaftanzoglio Stadium	Panathinaikos	41,700	
13 February 1972	Kaftanzoglio Stadium	PAOK	38,752	
23 May 1982	Kaftanzoglio Stadium	Panathinaikos	37,297	
23 September 1973	Kaftanzoglio Stadium	Panathinaikos	37,169	

== Head to head record against city rivals ==
Competition	Opponent	Pld	W	D	L
G.S. Iraklis Thessalonikis
First National Division / Superior Division / Super League	PAOK	102	26	41	53
First National Division / Superior Division / Super League	Aris	100	30	40	34
A.E.P. Iraklis 1908
Super League	PAOK	4	1	2	1
P.O.T. Iraklis
Super League 1	PAOK	1	0	0	1
Super League 1	Aris	1	0	1	0

== Honours and achievements ==
Type	Competition	Titles	Winners	Runners-up
International	Balkans Cup	1	1984–85	
Domestic	Panhellenic Championship (First-tier)	0		1933–34, 1938–39, 1946–47
Domestic	Super League 2 (Second-tier)	1	2025–26	2024–25
Domestic	Football League (Second-tier)	1	1980–81	2014–15
Domestic	Gamma Ethniki (Third-tier)	1	2017–18	
Domestic	Greek Cup	1	1975–76	1946–47, 1956–57, 1979–80, 1986–87
Domestic	Super League 2 Super Cup	0		2026
Domestic	Super League 2 Under-19 (Second-tier)	1	2025–26	
Domestic	Football League Under-19 (Second-tier)	1	2018–19	
Regional	Macedonia F.C.A. Championship	5	1926–27, 1938–39, 1939–40, 1950–51, 1951–52	1923–24, 1925–26, 1929–30, 1936–37, 1946–47, 1952–53
Regional	Macedonia F.C.A. Third Division	1	2019–20	
Regional	Thessaloniki Championship	2	1914, 1915	

== See also ==
- List of Iraklis Thessaloniki F.C. players
- List of Iraklis F.C. seasons
- G.S. Iraklis Thessaloniki
- G.S. Iraklis Thessaloniki (men's basketball)
- Iraklis B.C. in international competitions
- G.S. Iraklis Thessaloniki (women's basketball)
- Ivanofeio Sports Arena
- G.S. Iraklis Thessaloniki (men's volleyball)
- G.S. Iraklis Thessaloniki (women's volleyball)
- G.S. Iraklis Thessaloniki (water polo)
- G.S. Iraklis Thessaloniki (rugby)
