= Savvas Kofidis =

Greek footballer and coach

Personal information
- Date of birth: 5 February 1961 (age 65)
- Place of birth: Alma-Ata, Kazakh SSR, Soviet Union
- Height: 1.77 m (5 ft 9 1/2 in)
- Position: Midfielder

Team information
- Current team: Panserraikos (academy manager)

Senior career*
Years	Team	Apps	(Gls)
1981–1988	Iraklis	206	(18)
1988–1992	Olympiacos	93	(9)
1992–1997	Aris	126	(7)
1997–1999	Iraklis	69	(3)
Total		494	(37)

International career
1982–1994	Greece	67	(1)

Managerial career
- 2004–2006: Iraklis
- 2007: Skoda Xanthi
- 2009–2010: Iraklis
- 2012–2013: Anagennisi Giannitsa
- 2023–: Panserraikos (academy manager)
- * Club domestic league appearances and goals

Savvas Kofidis (Greek: Σάββας Κωφίδης; born 5 February 1961) is a Greek professional football manager and former player. He is regarded as one of the best football players of his generation in Greece, and is most famous for his successful partnership with Vasilis Hatzipanagis at Iraklis and his flamboyant haircuts which he has kept to this day. He also appeared 67 times for the Greece national team, scoring once and being a vital part of the team's qualification to the 1994 World Cup in the United States.

== Club career ==
Born in modern-day Kazakhstan to Pontic Greek parents, he started his career in Iraklis, debuting on 18 January 1981 when Iraklis was participating in the Beta Ethniki. In Iraklis's team he played seven seasons before heading to Olympiacos. In 1992, he joined Aris, the city rivals of Iraklis, where he played until rejoining Iraklis in the 1996–97 season.

== International career ==
His three appearances at the 1994 World Cup rounded off his national team career, which lasted from 1982 to 1994, giving him 67 caps and 1 international goal (9 January 1985, against Israel). He retired from professional football in 1999.

== Managerial career ==
During the 2002–2003 period he was the assistant coach of Ivan Jovanovic in Iraklis, as well as the next period, assisting head coach Sergio Markarián. After Markarián resigned, Kofidis took in charge as the head coach. The next year, with Kofidis taking the reins, was hugely successful as "The Old One", against all expectations, finished 4th in the 2005–2006 Alpha Ethniki championship, and qualified for the UEFA Cup. During the summer, however, many key players were sold as the team was in heavy debt, and the following year was anything but successful. After a string of 10 league matches without a win, and an early exit from the UEFA Cup against Polish team Wisła Kraków, Kofidis resigned. In January 2007 he became head coach in Skoda Xanthi following Takis Lemonis's resignation, but soon left the job. On 30 October 2009 the club officials of Iraklis have sacked the manager, Oleg Protasov to replace him with Kofidis.

== Career statistics ==
Season	Club	Matches	Goals
1981–82	Iraklis	31	1
1982–83	Iraklis	34	1
1983–84	Iraklis	29	4
1984–85	Iraklis	29	5
1985–86	Iraklis	28	1
1986–87	Iraklis	26	4
1987–88	Iraklis	29	2
1988–89	Olympiacos	16	2
1989–90	Olympiacos	26	3
1990–91	Olympiacos	33	4
1991–92	Olympiacos	18	0
1992–93	Aris	19	0
1993–94	Aris	33	0
1994–95	Aris	30	6
1995–96	Aris	31	1
1996–97	Aris	13	0
1996–97	Iraklis	18	1
1997–98	Iraklis	20	1
1998–99	Iraklis	31	1

=== Managerial statistics ===
Managerial record by team and tenure
Team	From	To	Record				
Team	From	To	P	W	D	L	Win %
Iraklis	21 December 2004	6 November 2006	63	26	11	26	41.3
Skoda Xanthi	22 December 2006	26 February 2007	10	3	5	2	30.0
Iraklis	30 October 2009	25 January 2010	11	3	3	5	27.3
AEP Paphos	3 February 2010	28 March 2010	8	2	1	5	25.0
Anagennisi Giannitsa	2 February 2013	20 June 2013	22	3	4	15	13.6
Total			114	37	24	53	32.5
