= Constantin Ignat =

Romanian footballer and coach

Personal information
- Date of birth: 18 November 1958 (age 67)
- Place of birth: Constanța, Romania
- Position: Midfielder

Senior career*
Years	Team	Apps	(Gls)
1976–1980	Farul Constanța		
1980–1991	Argeș Pitești		
1992–	Winnipeg Fury	8+	(1+)

International career
1976–1977	Romania U18	1	(0)
1977–1978	Romania U21	2	(0)
- * Club domestic league appearances and goals

Constantin Ignat (born 18 November 1958) is a Romanian football head coach and former player.

== Club career ==
Ignat played in the Divizia A in 1976 with Farul Constanța. In 1980, he played with Argeș Pitești, and featured in the 1980–81 UEFA Cup, and 1981–82 UEFA Cup. In 1992, he played abroad in the Canadian Soccer League with Winnipeg Fury. In his debut season he assisted the Fury in securing the Mita Cup after defeating Vancouver 86ers. The following season he played with Winnipeg in the Canadian National Soccer League.

== International career ==
Ignat played with the Romania U19 national team in 1976, and with the Romania U21 in 1977.

== Managerial career ==
Ignat became one of the founders of WSA Winnipeg in 2001, and entered the franchise into the USL Premier Development League in 2011. He also served as the team's assistant coach under head coach Eduardo Badescu.
