= Vasilis Hatzipanagis =

Greek former footballer (born 1954)

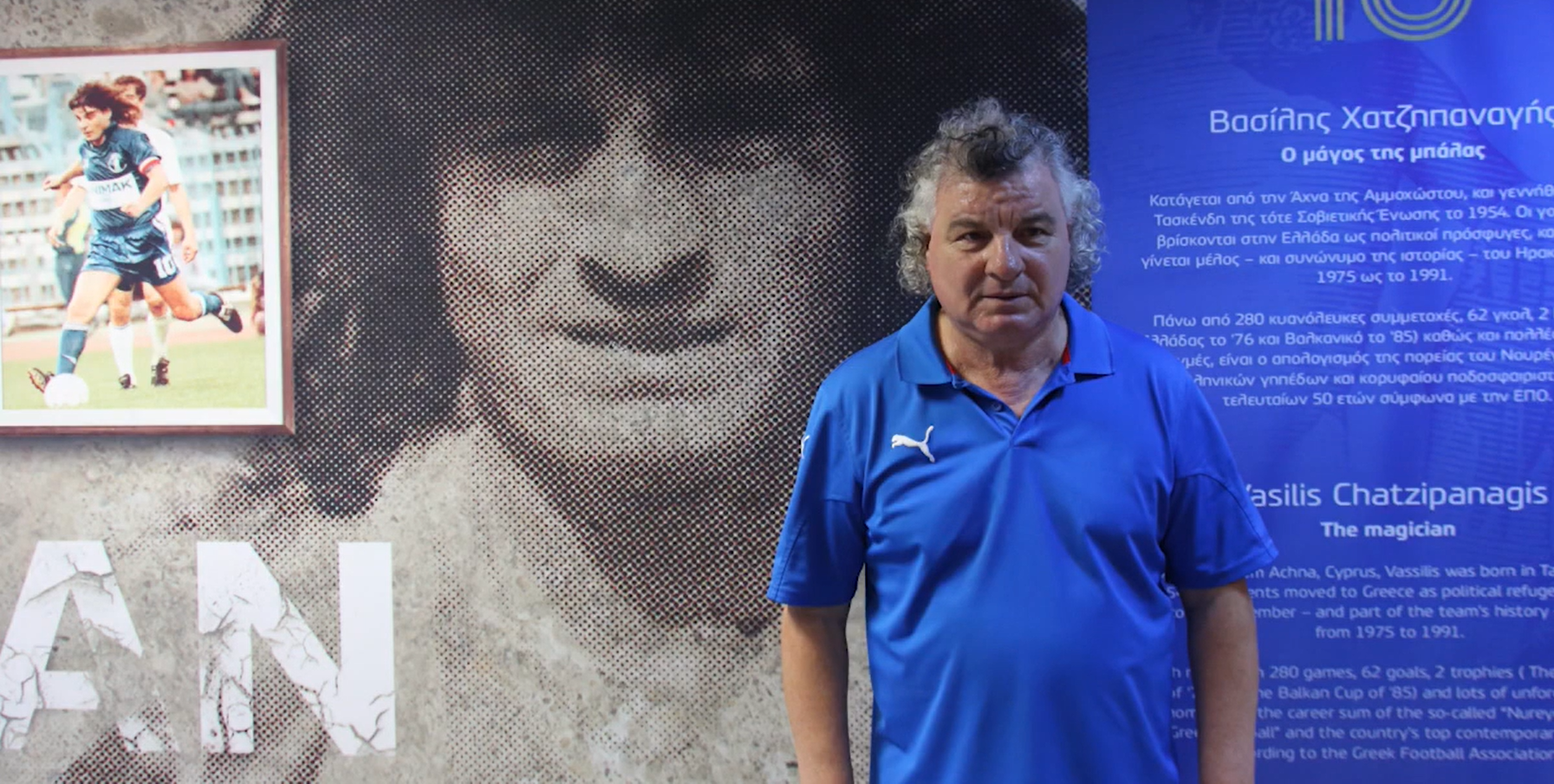

Personal information
- Full name: Vasilios Hatzipanagis
- Date of birth: 26 October 1954 (age 71)
- Place of birth: Tashkent, Uzbek SSR, Soviet Union
- Height: 1.73 m (5 ft 8 in)
- Positions: Winger; attacking midfielder

Senior career*
Years	Team	Apps	(Gls)
1972–1975	Pakhtakor Tashkent	96	(22)
1975–1990	Iraklis	281	(61)
1980	→ Toronto Panhellenic (loan)		
Total		377	(83)

International career
1974–1975	Soviet Union U19		
1975	Soviet Union Olympic	4	(1)
1976	Greece U21	4	(0)
1976–1999	Greece	2	(0)
- * Club domestic league appearances and goals

Vasilis Hatzipanagis (Greek: Βασίλης Χατζηπαναγής, Greek pronunciation: [vaˈsilis xad͡zipanaˈʝis], born 26 October 1954) is a Greek former professional footballer. He played as a midfielder for Iraklis in the Alpha Ethniki and Pakhtakor Tashkent in the Soviet Supreme League. He also played for Greece and the Soviet Union side.

Hatzipanagis is widely acclaimed among Greek and international football aficionados as one of the preeminent Greek footballers of all time. Despite his talent, his career was marred by contractual controversies. Numerous sources have bestowed upon him the epithet of "The Greek Maradona."

== Club career ==
=== Pakhtakor Tashkent ===
Hatzipanagis was born in 1954 in Tashkent, the capital city of the Uzbek Soviet Socialist Republic, to Greek political refugees. His father was Greek-Cypriot from Makrasyka, and his mother was from Constantinople. He was scouted by Pakhtakor Tashkent. They wanted to invest in this raw, yet refined player, but the law was strict: he had to apply for Soviet citizenship to be eligible for the Soviet top flight. Hatzipanagis made his professional debut at the age of 17. During his time there, he made ninety-six appearances and scored twenty-two goals, and gained promotion from the Soviet First League to the Soviet Supreme League in 1972.

=== Iraklis ===
With the Reign of the Colonels finally over the year before, Hatzipanagis signed for the Thessaloniki's club Iraklis, and such was his reputation that he filled the stadium for his first match in December 1975. The Iraklis fans would be one of the reasons this exceptional talent never joined another team, the other being his contract with Iraklis was heavily favoured towards the club, making it almost impossible for him to leave despite his desire to test himself in a better league. Despite interest from Lazio, Arsenal, Porto and Stuttgart, the club's board feared the consequences of selling the crowd favourite, and Hatzipanagis stayed at Iraklis until 1990. His farewell appearance for the club came in a UEFA Cup first round match against Valencia on 19 September, in a 0–0 draw. In the second leg on 3 October, the team lost 2–0 at the Mestalla Stadium, with Hatzipanagis an unused substitute.

==== Loan to Toronto Panhellenic ====
In the summer of 1980, he played abroad in the National Soccer League on loan with Toronto Panhellenic. He won the league play-offs with the club.

== International career ==
=== Soviet Union ===
He was called up to the Soviet Union under-19 squad. He was promoted to the senior squad and represented the Soviet Union Olympic team in the 1976 qualifying tournament. His debut was made in a 3–0 home win against Yugoslavia. He even managed to score his team's last goal in his debut. Hatzipanagis featured in three more matches (two matches against Iceland and one against Norway). However, despite being told by national coach Konstantin Beskov that his ability was "way above Greece's level", he turned his back on the Soviet league – where as a left-sided attacker he was considered second only to the great Oleg Blokhin – to move to the land of his fathers.

=== Greece ===
Another highlight for Hatzipanagis was his first appearance for Greece, in a friendly match against Poland at Leoforos Alexandras Stadium in May 1976. The crowd of Athens were bewitched by his skills, that seemed to do whatever he wanted with the ball at his feet. Afterward, Hatzipanagis was notified that he was ineligible for international duty, having played for the USSR. His second appearance with the national team came many years after his retirement on 14 December 1999, when he played for 20 minutes in the friendly match against Ghana. In this match he was honored by the Hellenic Football Federation for his overall contribution to Greek football.

== Style of play and Legacy ==
As an attacking midfielder with Iraklis, he packed in the crowds at Thessaloniki's Kaftanzoglio Stadium, where his performances earned him the moniker of "the footballing Nureyev". However, the reason he gave for his fancy footwork was simple enough. "When I see defenders in front of me, I want to dribble around every one of them," he once said.

Further recognition did come on 22 June 1984, when he was invited to join a World XI featuring other legends such as Franz Beckenbauer, Mario Kempes, Kevin Keegan, Dominique Rocheteau, Peter Shilton, Jean-Marie Pfaff, Hugo Sanchez, Ruud Krol, Felix Magath and his countryman Thomas Mavros for a match against New York Cosmos in New Jersey.

In November 2003, to celebrate UEFA's 50th anniversary, he was selected as Greece's Golden Player of the past 50 years by the Hellenic Football Federation. Aged 50, Hatzipanagis said: "It is very touching to see that you are not forgotten, that your contribution is appreciated even after so many years." He added: "I regret not having been able to wear the Greek national jersey more than once. And I regret not having made a career abroad. I would have liked to play in a better league, to have enjoyed football at that level. If I could turn back the clock, I would do some things differently."

== Career statistics ==
=== Club ===
Club	League			Cup		Europe		Balkans Cup		Total	
Club	Division	Apps	Goals	Apps	Goals	Apps	Goals	Apps	Goals	Apps	Goals
Pakhtakor Tashkent	Soviet First League	96	22	9	2	0	0	0	0	105	24
Iraklis	Alpha Ethniki	281	61			1	0	3	1	285	62
Career total		377	83	9	2	1	0	3	1	390	86

Last updated: 2025-06-20
Source: Vasilis Hatzipanagis at National-Football-Teams.com

=== International ===
Appearances and goals by national team and year
National team	Year	Apps	Goals
Soviet Union U19	1975	4	1
Soviet Union U19	Total	4	1
Greece U21	1976	4	0
Greece U21	Total	4	0
Greece	1976	1	0
Greece	1999	1	0
Greece	Total	2	0
Career total		10	1

== Honours ==
Pakhtakor Tashkent

- Soviet First League: 1972

Iraklis

- Greek Cup: 1975–76
- Balkans Cup: 1985

Toronto Panhellenic

- Canadian National Soccer League Play-Off: 1980

Individual

- Soviet Masters of Sports award
  - Master of Sports: 1974
- UEFA Jubilee Awards
  - Greece's Golden Player: 1954–2003
- Goals from direct corner kicks: 7, in the 1982-83 season
