= 1981–82 Alpha Ethniki =

46th season of top-tier football league in Greece

Alpha Ethniki
- Season: 1981–82
- Champions: Olympiacos; 23rd Greek title
- Relegated: Kavala; Korinthos
- European Cup: Olympiacos
- Cup Winners' Cup: Panathinaikos
- UEFA Cup: AEK Athens; PAOK
- Matches: 306
- Goals: 709 (2.32 per match)
- Top goalscorer: Grigoris Charalampidis (21 goals)

The 1981–82 Alpha Ethniki was the 46th season of the highest football league of Greece. The season began on 6 September 1981 and ended on 30 May 1982. Olympiacos won their third consecutive and 23rd Greek title.

The point system was: Win: 2 points - Draw: 1 point.

== Teams ==
| Promoted from 1980–81 Beta Ethniki | Relegated from 1980–81 Alpha Ethniki |
|---|---|
| Rodos; Iraklis | Panachaiki; Atromitos |

Location of teams in 1981–82 Alpha Ethniki

== League table ==
| Pos | Team | Pld | W | D | L | GF | GA | GD | Pts | Qualification or relegation |
|---|---|---|---|---|---|---|---|---|---|---|
| 1 | Olympiacos (C) | 34 | 18 | 14 | 2 | 46 | 21 | +25 | 50 (Note: Championship play–off: Olympiacos–Panathinaikos 2–1 (see below).) | Qualification for European Cup first round |
| 2 | Panathinaikos | 34 | 19 | 12 | 3 | 58 | 28 | +30 | 50 | Qualification for Cup Winners' Cup first round |
| 3 | PAOK | 34 | 18 | 10 | 6 | 55 | 22 | +33 | 46 | Qualification for UEFA Cup first round |
| 4 | AEK Athens | 34 | 17 | 11 | 6 | 54 | 36 | +18 | 45 | Qualification for UEFA Cup first round |
| 5 | Aris | 34 | 15 | 11 | 8 | 56 | 30 | +26 | 41 | |
| 6 | Iraklis | 34 | 15 | 10 | 9 | 52 | 38 | +14 | 40 | |
| 7 | Panionios | 34 | 14 | 8 | 12 | 39 | 31 | +8 | 36 | |
| 8 | Kastoria | 34 | 13 | 8 | 13 | 38 | 43 | −5 | 34 | |
| 9 | OFI | 34 | 11 | 11 | 12 | 38 | 36 | +2 | 33 | |
| 10 | AEL | 34 | 12 | 7 | 15 | 40 | 38 | +2 | 31 | |
| 11 | Doxa Drama | 34 | 10 | 11 | 13 | 38 | 46 | −8 | 31 | |
| 12 | Rodos | 34 | 11 | 9 | 14 | 37 | 46 | −9 | 31 | |
| 13 | Ethnikos Piraeus | 34 | 10 | 10 | 14 | 30 | 38 | −8 | 30 | |
| 14 | PAS Giannina | 34 | 9 | 10 | 15 | 32 | 48 | −16 | 28 | |
| 15 | Apollon Athens | 34 | 9 | 9 | 16 | 27 | 42 | −15 | 27 | |
| 16 | Panserraikos | 34 | 8 | 9 | 17 | 26 | 45 | −19 | 25 | |
| 17 | Kavala (R) | 34 | 5 | 8 | 21 | 19 | 58 | −39 | 18 | Relegation to Beta Ethniki |
| 18 | Korinthos (R) | 34 | 6 | 4 | 24 | 24 | 63 | −39 | 16 | Relegation to Beta Ethniki |

Source: RSSSF
Rules for classification: 1st points; 2nd decision match; 3rd head-to-head goal difference.
(C) Champions; (R) Relegated

== Results ==
| Home \ Away | AEK | AEL | APA | ARIS | DOX | ETH | IRA | KAS | KAV | KOR | OFI | OLY | PAO | PAN | PNS | PAOK | PAS | ROD |
|---|---|---|---|---|---|---|---|---|---|---|---|---|---|---|---|---|---|---|
| AEK Athens | | 2–0 | 2–1 | 2–2 | 2–2 | 3–1 | 3–0 | 2–1 | 5–0 | 4–1 | 1–0 | 2–2 | 1–0 | 1–0 | 3–1 | 1–1 | 0–0 | 2–0 |
| AEL | 1–2 | | 1–0 | 0–0 | 2–2 | 0–0 | 4–1 | 2–0 | 8–2 | 3–0 | 1–2 | 0–1 | 2–2 | 0–1 | 2–0 | 1–0 | 1–0 | 1–0 |
| Apollon Athens | 0–1 | 2–0 | | 1–3 | 0–0 | 2–0 | 1–1 | 1–0 | 2–0 | 2–1 | 1–1 | 1–1 | 0–2 | 2–1 | 1–1 | 1–0 | 1–0 | 1–2 |
| Aris | 3–0 | 1–1 | 1–0 | | 1–0 | 2–0 | 4–0 | 5–0 | 4–0 | 2–0 | 3–3 | 0–0 | 1–1 | 1–0 | 4–1 | 2–1 | 3–0 | 3–0 |
| Doxa Drama | 2–2 | 1–1 | 1–0 | 1–2 | | 2–0 | 1–1 | 2–0 | 1–0 | 5–1 | 1–1 | 1–2 | 1–1 | 1–0 | 2–2 | 0–1 | 3–1 | 0–0 |
| Ethnikos Piraeus | 1–2 | 1–0 | 1–1 | 2–1 | 2–0 | | 1–1 | 2–1 | 1–0 | 0–0 | 2–1 | 0–1 | 1–1 | 0–0 | 1–0 | 0–2 | 0–0 | 0–0 |
| Iraklis | 3–2 | 2–1 | 4–0 | 0–0 | 2–1 | 1–0 | | 6–2 | 1–0 | 6–0 | 2–0 | 0–1 | 2–1 | 2–1 | 0–0 | 0–0 | 2–1 | 2–0 |
| Kastoria | 2–1 | 1–0 | 1–0 | 2–1 | 4–0 | 1–0 | 2–1 | | 1–0 | 1–0 | 3–0 | 0–1 | 1–2 | 1–1 | 2–0 | 1–1 | 2–0 | 5–0 |
| Kavala | 0–0 | 1–0 | 0–0 | 3–2 | 0–2 | 1–3 | 1–0 | 0–0 | | 0–0 | 1–0 | 1–2 | 0–1 | 0–1 | 1–0 | 1–2 | 1–1 | 1–1 |
| Korinthos | 0–1 | 0–2 | 1–2 | 2–1 | 3–1 | 0–4 | 2–0 | 0–0 | 2–1 | | 1–0 | 1–2 | 1–2 | 2–3 | 3–2 | 0–0 | 0–1 | 0–1 |
| OFI | 1–0 | 1–2 | 5–2 | 4–1 | 1–2 | 2–0 | 2–1 | 1–1 | 2–0 | 1–0 | | 0–0 | 1–2 | 0–0 | 2–0 | 0–1 | 1–0 | 1–0 |
| Olympiacos | 2–2 | 2–1 | 0–0 | 1–1 | 3–0 | 0–0 | 1–0 | 5–0 | 1–1 | 3–1 | 1–0 | | 1–1 | 2–1 | 1–0 | 0–0 | 0–0 | 4–0 |
| Panathinaikos | 3–0 | 1–1 | 2–0 | 2–1 | 4–0 | 2–1 | 1–1 | 3–1 | 4–0 | 3–1 | 1–1 | 1–1 | | 1–0 | 2–1 | 2–1 | 3–1 | 2–1 |
| Panionios | 1–2 | 1–0 | 3–1 | 0–0 | 1–0 | 2–1 | 2–3 | 2–0 | 3–0 | 1–0 | 1–1 | 0–0 | 0–0 | | 1–0 | 1–1 | 3–0 | 3–0 |
| Panserraikos | 2–0 | 0–1 | 0–0 | 0–0 | 0–1 | 1–0 | 0–0 | 0–0 | 2–1 | 2–0 | 1–1 | 1–2 | 1–1 | 0–2 | | 2–1 | 3–1 | 1–0 |
| PAOK | 1–1 | 3–0 | 3–0 | 1–0 | 3–1 | 5–1 | 2–2 | 0–0 | 3–1 | 1–0 | 2–0 | 3–0 | 2–0 | 2–1 | 4–0 | | 2–1 | 5–0 |
| PAS Giannina | 2–2 | 3–1 | 2–1 | 1–0 | 1–1 | 2–2 | 0–4 | 4–2 | 0–0 | 2–1 | 0–0 | 2–1 | 0–3 | 2–1 | 1–2 | 0–0 | | 3–1 |
| Rodos | 0–0 | 3–0 | 1–0 | 1–1 | 2–0 | 1–2 | 1–1 | 0–0 | 3–1 | 4–0 | 2–2 | 0–2 | 1–1 | 5–1 | 4–0 | 2–1 | 1–0 | |

Source: RSSSF
Legend: Blue = home team win; Yellow = draw; Red = away team win.

=== Championship play–off ===
29 June 1982

| Olympiacos | 2–1 | Panathinaikos |
|---|---|---|
| Vicente 7'; Anastopoulos 69' | Report | Ziakos 82' |

Volos Municipal Stadium, Volos
Attendance: 7,000
Referee: Stathis Kosmopoulos (Elis)

== Top scorers ==
| Rank | Player | Club | Goals |
|---|---|---|---|
| 1 | (Greece) Grigoris Charalampidis | Panathinaikos | 21 |
| 2 | (Greece) Georgios Kostikos | PAOK | 18 |
| 3 | (Greece) Thomas Mavros | AEK Athens | 17 |
| 4 | (Greece) Dinos Kouis | Aris | 15 |
| 5 | (Greece) Thomas Liolios | Kastoria | 14 |
| 6 | (Greece) Nikos Anastopoulos | Olympiacos | 13 |
| 6 | (Greece) Giorgos Zindros | Aris | 13 |
| 6 | (Greece) Giorgos Kalambakas | Iraklis | 13 |
| 6 | (Greece) Dimitris Saravakos | Panionios | 13 |
| 10 | (Greece) Vasilis Papadimitriou | Panserraikos | 11 |

== Attendances ==
Olympiacos drew the highest average home attendance in the 1981–82 Alpha Ethniki.

| # | Team | Average attendance |
|---|---|---|
| 1 | Olympiacos | 22,046 |
| 2 | Panathinaikos | 19,982 |
| 3 | AEK Athens | 14,663 |
| 4 | PAOK | 12,355 |
| 5 | Iraklis | 11,248 |
| 6 | Aris | 8,512 |
| 7 | Ethnikos Piraeus | 6,973 |
| 8 | Panionios | 6,953 |
| 9 | AEL | 6,672 |
| 10 | Apollon Athens | 5,745 |
| 11 | Rodos | 5,189 |
| 12 | OFI | 4,784 |
| 13 | PAS Giannina | 4,710 |
| 14 | Panserraikos | 4,501 |
| 15 | Doxa Drama | 4,207 |
| 16 | Korinthos | 3,876 |
| 17 | Kavala | 3,143 |
| 18 | Kastoria | 3,033 |
