= 2009–10 Iraklis F.C. season =

G.S. Iraklis Thessalonikis 2009–10 association football season

Iraklis
2009–10 season
- President: Antonis Remos
- Manager: Oleh Protasov (until 30 October 2009); Savvas Kofidis (from 30 October 2009 to 25 January 2010); Jozef Bubenko (from 25 January 2010)
- Super League Greece: 10th
- Greek Cup: Fourth round
- Top goalscorer: League: Victoraş Iacob (11); All: Victoraş Iacob (11)
- Highest home attendance: 7.745 vs Aris (29 August 2009)
- Lowest home attendance: 2.458 vs Panthrakikos (6 January 2010)
Home colours	Away colours	Third colours

The 2009–2010 season was Iraklis 29th consecutive (and 50th in total) season in the Super League Greece.

== Transfers ==
=== In ===
Date	Player	From	Fee	Source
1 June 2009	(Greece) Giorgos Katsikas	(Greece) Olympiacos Volos	End of loan	
19 June 2009	(Portugal) Nuno Piloto	(Portugal) Académica Coimbra	Free	
19 June 2009	(Romania) Nicolae Dică	(Italy) Calcio Catania	1-year loan	
23 June 2009	(Sweden) Sharbel Touma	(Germany) Borussia Mönchengladbach	Free	
25 June 2009	(Moldova) Cristian Efros	(Moldova) Beşiktaş Chişinău	Unknown	
29 June 2009	(Romania) Victoraş Iacob	(Romania) CS Otopeni	Free	
6 July 2009	(Argentina) Mauro Ramiro Milano	(Greece) Asteras Tripolis	Free	
8 July 2009	(Croatia) Ivan Bošnjak	(Belgium) K.R.C. Genk	Free	
11 July 2009	(Argentina) Matías Lequi		Free	
5 August 2009	(Greece) Stelios Iliadis	(Greece) PAOK	Free	
10 August 2009	(Italy) Samuele Dalla Bona	(Italy) Napoli	1-year loan	
15 January 2010	(Romania) Bogdan Mara	(Romania) CFR Cluj	Free	
18 January 2010	(Portugal) Daniel Fernandes	(Germany) VfL Bochum	6-month loan	
21 January 2010	(Portugal) André Marques	(Portugal) Sporting CP	6-month loan	
26 January 2010	(Brazil) Carlos César Matheus	(Brazil) Figueirense	Free	
27 January 2010	(Japan) Daigo Kobayashi	(Japan) Omiya Ardija	Free	
1 February 2010	(Paraguay) Fredy Vera	(Paraguay) Club Rubio Ñú	6-month loan	
1 February 2010	(Argentina) Miguel Sebastián Garcia	(Greece) Aris Thessaloniki F.C.	Free	
1 February 2010	(Argentina) Lucas Roberto Rimoldi	(Greece) Panserraikos F.C.	Free	

=== Out ===
Date	Player	To	Fee	Source
23 May 2009	(Spain) Kiko Ratón	(Spain) Girona FC	Released	
28 May 2009	(Greece) Nikolaos Psichogios	(Greece) Olympiacos Volos	2-year loan	
5 June 2009	(Greece) Savvas Exouzidis	(Greece) Pierikos	Released	
17 June 2009	(Spain) Fernando Marqués	(Spain) RCD Espanyol	Released	
17 June 2009	(Argentina) Miguel Sebastián Garcia	(Argentina) Unión de Santa Fe	End of loan	
6 July 2009	(Greece) Aggelos Komvolidis	(Greece) Anagennisi Karditsa	Released	
6 July 2009	(Greece) Errikos Drambis		Released	
14 July 2009	(Greece) Giorgos Moschakis	(Greece) Anagennisi Giannitsa F.C.	1-year loan	
20 August 2009	(Greece) Kydon Karlopoulos	(Greece) Olympiacos Volos	Released	
28 August 2009	(Serbia) Aleksandar Vuković	(Poland) Korona Kielce	Released	
31 August 2009	(Greece) Anestis Agritis	(Greece) OFI	Released	
2 September 2009	(Greece) Christos Bourbos	(Greece) OFI	Released	
10 January 2010	(Albania) Enea Koliçi	(Greece) Olympiacos Volos	Released	
11 January 2010	(Romania) Nicolae Dică	(Romania) CFR Cluj	End of loan	
21 January 2010	(Poland) Wojciech Kowalewski	(Russia) Sibir Novosibirsk	Released	
21 January 2010	(Ivory Coast) Serge Dié	(Greece) Kavala F.C.	Released	
21 January 2010	(Greece) Kostas Foufoulas	(Greece) Olympiacos Volos	Released	
27 January 2010	(Italy) Samuele Dalla Bona		End of loan	
22 March 2010	(Sweden) Sharbel Touma	(Sweden) Djurgården	Released	

== Club ==
=== Management ===
Position	Staff
Head coach	(Ukraine) Oleh Protasov (until 30 October 2009) (Greece) Savvas Kofidis (from 30 October 2009 to 25 January 2010) (Slovakia) Jozef Bubenko (from 25 January 2010)
Assistant coach	(Greece) Nikos Nentidis (until 30 October 2009) (Slovakia) Jozef Pavlík (from 25 January 2010)
General manager	(Greece) Grigoris Fanaras
Team Supervisor – Interpreter	(Greece) Alexandros Koliadis
Physical trainer	(Greece) Nikolaos Karidas (until 22 October 2009) (Greece) Charalambos Mavridis (since 23 October 2009)
Goalkeeper Trainer	(Greece) Fotios Gizelis
Doctor	(Greece) Charalambos Lazaridis
Physiotherapist	(Greece) Petros Gazas
Physiotherapist	(Greece) Konstantinos Tsiolakidis
Masseur	(Greece) Thomas Nikou
Care Taker	(Greece) Georgios Siagas
Care Taker	(Greece) Ilias Kapagiannidis

Last updated: January 2010
Source: iraklis-fc.gr

=== Kit ===
Supplier: Puma
Sponsor(s): Attica Bank

Home	Away	Third kit

Source: iraklis-fc.gr

=== Other information ===
Chairman	(Greece) Antonis Remos
Vice President	(Greece) Dimos Polikarpos
Team Director	(Greece) Ilias Poursanidis
Ground (capacity and dimensions)	Kaftanzoglio Stadium (28,028 / 68x105 m)

Source: kaftanzoglio.gr

== Pre-season and friendlies ==
Date	Opponent	Venue	Result	Attendance	Scorers
14 July 2009	Lech Poznań	A	2–3	–	Iacob, Katsikas
18 July 2009	CFR Cluj	A	0–2	–	
21 July 2009	TSV 1860 München	A	0–2	–	
29 July 2009	Parma F.C.	A	2–1	–	Bošnjak, Epstein
1 August 2009	Atalanta B.C.	A	1–1	–	Epstein (pen.)
6 August 2009	A.C. ChievoVerona	A	0–1	–	
6 August 2009	A.S. Bari	A	1–2	–	Giantsis
12 August 2009	Levadiakos F.C.	H	3–1	–	Iacob, Vellios, Kone
16 August 2009	Anagennisi Giannitsa F.C.	A	2–0	–	Touma, Dalla Bona
4 September 2009	FC Lokomotiv Mezdra	A	1–1	–	Papazaharias
5 September 2009	Anagennisi Epanomi F.C.	A	4–0	–	Milano, Papazaharias, Foufoulas, Voutsias
10 February 2010	FK Mladi Radnik	H	2–1	–	Kone (pen.), Kobayashi

== Super League Greece ==
=== League table ===
Pos	Team	Pld	W	D	L	GF	GA	GD	Pts
8	AEL	30	10	7	13	31	42	−11	37 (Note: Head-to-head points: Larissa 7, Panionios 5, Iraklis 4.)
9	Panionios	30	9	10	11	34	35	−1	37
10	Iraklis	30	10	7	13	39	41	−2	37
11	Ergotelis	30	9	9	12	37	41	−4	36 (Note: Head-to-head points: Ergotelis 6, Asteras Tripolis 0.)
12	Asteras Tripolis	30	10	6	14	29	36	−7	36

Source: Super League Greece
Rules for classification: 1) Points; 2) Head-to-head points; 3) Head-to-head goal difference; 4) Play-offs (neutral ground).
(Note: Criterion 4 is only used if needed to decide champion, teams for relegation or teams for UEFA competitions).

==== Results summary ====
Overall								Home						Away					
Pld	W	D	L	GF	GA	GD	Pts	W	D	L	GF	GA	GD	W	D	L	GF	GA	GD
30	10	7	13	39	41	−2	37	6	5	4	19	18	+1	4	2	9	20	23	−3

Last updated: 18 April.
Source: iraklis-fc.gr

==== Results by round ====
Round	1	2	3	4	5	6	7	8	9	10	11	12	13	14	15	16	17	18	19	20	21	22	23	24	25	26	27	28	29	30
Ground	A	H	A	H	A	A	H	A	H	A	H	H	A	H	A	H	A	H	A	H	H	A	H	A	H	A	A	H	A	H
Result	W	D	L	W	L	L	L	L	W	D	D	L	W	L	L	W	L	D	L	W	D	D	D	W	W	L	W	W	L	L
Position	2	3	8	6	8	11	11	15	11	10	11	13	10	11	12	12	11	12	13	12	12	12	12	11	9	9	9	7	7	10

Source: iraklis-fc.gr
A = Away; H = Home; W = Win; D = Draw; L = Loss

==== Matches ====
Date	Opponent	Venue	Result	Attendance	Scorers
23 August 2009	Panthrakikos	A	2–1	4.405	Dică (2)
29 August 2009	Aris	H	2–2	7.745	Iacob, Epstein (pen.)
13 September 2009	AEK Athens	A	0–1	16.736	
19 September 2009	AEL	H	2–1	–	Epstein, Iacob
27 September 2009	Kavala	A	0–1	4.182	
5 October 2009	PAOK	A	0–1	13.944	
18 October 2009	Panionios	H	0–2	4.061	
25 October 2009	Levadiakos	A	0–1	987	
1 November 2009	Asteras Tripolis	H	1–0	3.679	Iacob
7 November 2009	Olympiacos	A	1–1	20.415	Vellios
22 November 2009	Atromitos	H	2–2	3.998	Iacob, Vellios
28 November 2009	Ergotelis	H	0–2	2.482	
6 December 2009	PAS Giannina	A	3–2	4.109	Epstein (pen.), Dică, Kone
12 December 2009	Panathinaikos	H	0–1	6.455	
20 December 2009	Skoda Xanthi	A	3–4	907	Voutsias, Sarakatsanos, Milano
6 January 2010	Panthrakikos	H	3–1	2.458	Iliadis, Iacob, Milano
10 January 2010	Aris	A	2–4	15.910	Epstein, Milano
16 January 2010	AEK	H	1–1	5.019	Kone
23 January 2010	AEL	A	1–2	2.461	Giantsis
30 January 2010	Kavala	H	1–0	3.127	Iacob
7 February 2010	PAOK	H	1–1	4.571	Giantsis
14 February 2010	Panionios	A	0–0	1.056	
20 February 2010	Levadiakos	H	1–1	4.089	Kone
27 February 2010	Asteras Tripolis	A	4–0	1.890	Iacob (2), Kone, Milano (pen.)
7 March 2010	Olympiacos	H	1–0	5.470	Mara (pen.)
13 March 2010	Atromitos	A	1–2	1.161	Papazaharias
21 March 2010	Ergotelis	A	3–1	1.146	Budimir (o.g.), Iacob, Papazaharias
28 March 2010	PAS Giannina	H	2–0	3.155	Iacob, Iliadis
11 April 2010	Panathinaikos	A	0–2	49.747	
18 April 2010	Skoda Xanthi	H	2–4	3.035	Kone, Iacob

== Greek Cup ==
=== Matches ===
Date	Round	Opponent	Venue	Result	Attendance	Scorers
29 October 2009	R4	AO Trikala	A	0–1	-	

== Player statistics ==
- ¹ Denotes player has left the club in the January transfer window. ² Denotes player joined in the January transfer window.

No.	Pos.	Player	Apps	G	YC	RC
1	GK	(Greece) Georgios Bantis	6	0	1	0
2	DF	(Greece) Grigoris Papazaharias	20	2	6	1
4	DF	(Greece) Anastasios Katsabis	27	0	7	0
5	DF	(Greece) Giorgos Katsikas	1	0	0	0
6	MF	(Ivory Coast) Serge Dié¹	14	0	5	0
6	DF	(Portugal) André Marques²	1	0	0	0
7	MF	(Sweden) Sharbel Touma	8	0	2	0
8	DF	(Spain) Francisco Martos	26	0	4	0
9	FW	(Greece) Apostolos Vellios	9	2	1	0
10	MF	(Romania) Nicolae Dică¹	13	3	3	0
10	MF	(Romania) Bogdan Mara²	12	1	2	0
11	MF	(Brazil) Carlos César Matheus²	6	0	1	0
12	FW	(Croatia) Ivan Bošnjak	13	0	1	0
13	DF	(Greece) Kostas Foufoulas¹	2	0	0	0
13	DF	(Paraguay) Fredy Vera²	0	0	0	0
16	MF	(Greece) Georgios Ioannidis	4	0	1	0
17	MF	(Greece) Emmanouil Papasterianos	22	0	6	2
18	DF	(Greece) Kostas Giannoulis	22	0	10	0
19	FW	(Greece) Dimitris Giantsis	15	2	0	0
20	FW	(Romania) Victoraş Iacob	23	11	19	5
21	MF	(Germany) Denis Epstein	26	4	3	0
23	DF	(Greece) Charalabos Perperidis	6	0	2	0
24	MF	(Italy) Samuele Dalla Bona¹	2	0	0	0
27	DF	(Argentina) Matías Lequi	14	0	1	0
28	MF	(Portugal) Nuno Piloto	0	0	0	0
29	MF	(Argentina) Lucas Roberto Rimoldi²	3	0	1	0
30	GK	(Poland) Wojciech Kowalewski¹	14	0	1	0
31	GK	(Greece) Ilias Melkas	0	0	0	0
32	MF	(Argentina) Mauro Ramiro Milano	20	4	4	0
33	DF	(Greece) Achilleas Sarakatsanos	14	1	3	0
36	MF	(Greece) Paschalis Voutsias	6	1	1	0
66	GK	(Portugal) Daniel Fernandes²	10	0	2	0
80	MF	(Japan) Daigo Kobayashi²	8	0	0	0
84	MF	(Argentina) Miguel Sebastián Garcia²	10	0	3	0
87	GK	(Greece) Ilias Makris	0	0	0	0
88	MF	(Greece) Stelios Iliadis	18	2	3	0
99	MF	(Greece) Panagiotis Kone	24	5	8	0

== See also ==
- Iraklis F.C. (Thessaloniki)
- List of Iraklis Thessaloniki F.C. players
- List of Iraklis F.C. seasons
- G.S. Iraklis Thessaloniki
- G.S. Iraklis Thessaloniki (men's basketball)
- Iraklis B.C. in international competitions
- G.S. Iraklis Thessaloniki (women's basketball)
- Ivanofeio Sports Arena
- G.S. Iraklis Thessaloniki (men's volleyball)
- G.S. Iraklis Thessaloniki (women's volleyball)
- G.S. Iraklis Thessaloniki (water polo)
- G.S. Iraklis Thessaloniki (rugby)
