= 2008–09 Iraklis F.C. season =

G.S. Iraklis Thessalonikis 2008–09 association football season

Iraklis
2008–09 season
- President: Antonis Remos
- Manager: Ángel Pedraza (until 3 November 2008); Rodolfo Borrell (from 3 November to 3 December 2008); Makis Katsavakis (from 3 December 2008 to 22 March 2009); Christos Zifkas (since 24 March 2009)
- Super League Greece: 10th
- Greek Cup: Fifth round
- Top goalscorer: League: Denis Epstein (4); All: Denis Epstein (4)
- Highest home attendance: 9.066 vs Olympiacos (22 November 2008)
- Lowest home attendance: 2.705 vs Asteras Tripolis (12 April 2009)
| Home colours | Away colours | Third colours |

The 2008–2009 season was Iraklis 28th consecutive (and 49th in total) season in the Super League Greece.

== Transfers ==
=== In ===
| Date | Player | From | Fee | Source |
|---|---|---|---|---|
| 2 June 2008 | (Greece) Anestis Agritis | (Germany) Kickers Offenbach | Free | |
| 24 June 2008 | (Germany) Denis Epstein | (Germany) Kickers Offenbach | Free | |
| 25 June 2008 | (Ivory Coast) Serge Dié | (France) AC Ajaccio | Free | |
| 27 June 2008 | (Greece) Christos Bourbos | (Greece) AEK Athens | Free | |
| 30 June 2008 | (Greece) Achilleas Sarakatsanos | (Greece) Panathinaikos F.C. | €40,000 | |
| 11 July 2008 | (Cyprus) Feidias Panayiotou | (Cyprus) Olympiakos Nicosia | Free | |
| 12 July 2008 | (Spain) Francisco Martos | (Spain) Málaga CF B | Free | |
| 18 July 2008 | (Spain) Kiko Ratón | (Spain) Orihuela CF | Free | |
| 22 July 2008 | (Greece) Kostas Foufoulas | (Greece) Kerkyra | Free | |
| 7 August 2008 | (Poland) Wojciech Kowalewski | (Poland) Korona Kielce | Free | |
| 30 August 2008 | (Cyprus) Michalis Konstantinou | (Greece) Olympiacos F.C. | Free | |
| 30 August 2008 | (Greece) Panagiotis Kone | (Greece) AEK Athens | Free | |
| 2 January 2009 | (Serbia) Aleksandar Vukovic | (Poland) Legia Warsaw | Free | |
| 11 January 2009 | (Greece) Savvas Exouzidis | (Netherlands) RKC Waalwijk | Free | |

=== Out ===
| Date | Player | To | Fee | Source |
|---|---|---|---|---|
| June 2008 | (Greece) Dimitris Mavrogenidis | (Greece) Thrasyvoulos F.C. | Released | |
| June 2008 | (France) Alain Raguel | (Greece) Olympiacos Volos | Released | |
| June 2008 | (Spain) Xavi Moro | (Spain) Mérida UD | Released | |
| June 2008 | (Greece) Ilias Poursanidis | | Retired | |
| June 2008 | (Greece) Giannis Papadopoulos | (Greece) Olympiacos | €800,000 | |
| June 2008 | (Greece) Giannis Chloros | (Greece) Thrasyvoulos F.C. | Released | |
| June 2008 | (Spain) Aarón Ñíguez Εsclapez | (Scotland) Rangers FC | End of loan | |
| 9 July 2008 | (Spain) Urko Rafael Pardo | (Romania) FC Rapid București | €900,000 | |
| 19 January 2009 | (Cyprus) Michalis Konstantinou | (Cyprus) AC Omonia | – | |

== Club ==
=== Management ===
| Position | Staff |
|---|---|
| Head coach | (Spain) Ángel Pedraza Lamilla (until 3 November 2008) (Greece) Makis Katsavakis (from 3 December 2008 to 22 March 2009) |
| Assistant coach | (Spain) Rodolfo Marco Borrell (until 3 December 2008) (Greece) Ilias Karakostas (from 3 December 2008 to 22 March 2009) |
| Team Supervisor – Interpreter | (Greece) Alexandros Koliadis |
| Physical trainer | (Spain) Luis Francisco Saez Zaldivar (until 3 December 2008) (Greece) Dimitrios Tsakalidis (from 3 December 2008 to 22 March 2009) |
| Goalkeeper Trainer | (Greece) Fotios Gizelis |
| Doctor | (Greece) Charalambos Lazaridis |
| Physiotherapist | (Greece) Petros Gazas |
| Physiotherapist | (Greece) Konstantinos Tsolakidis |
| Masseur | (Greece) Thomas Nikou |
| Care Taker | (Greece) Eleftherios Iliadis |
| Care Taker | (Greece) Ilias Kapagiannidis |

Last updated: December 2008
Source: iraklis-fc.gr

=== Kit ===
Supplier: Puma
Sponsor(s): Attica Bank

| Home | Away | Third kit |

Source: iraklis-fc.gr

=== Other information ===
| Chairman | (Greece) Antonis Remos |
| Vice President | (Greece) Dimos Polikarpos |
| Team Director | (Greece) Ilias Poursanidis |
| Ground (capacity and dimensions) | Kaftanzoglio Stadium (28,028 / 68x105 m) |

Source: kaftanzoglio.gr

== Pre-season and friendlies ==
| Date | Opponent | Venue | Result | Attendance | Scorers |
|---|---|---|---|---|---|
| 19 July 2008 | Levadiakos | A | 1-1 | – | Anestis Agritis |
| 30 July 2008 | SC Heerenveen | A | 0-2 | – | |
| 3 August 2008 | KRC Genk | A | 1-1 | – | Kiko Ratón |
| 6 August 2008 | Sparta Rotterdam | A | 2-1 | – | Anestis Agritis (2) |
| 9 August 2008 | AZ Alkmaar | A | 0-3 | – | |
| 11 August 2008 | NEC Nijmegen | A | 1-1 | – | Denis Epstein |
| 20 August 2008 | Larissa | H | 1-0 | – | Fernando Marqués |
| 23 August 2008 | Olympiacos Volos | A | 2-2 | – | Miguel Sebastian Garcia, Dimitris Giantsis |
| 5 September 2008 | FC Rapid București | H | 0-2 | – | |

== Super League Greece ==
=== League table ===
| Pos | Team | Pld | W | D | L | GF | GA | GD | Pts |
|---|---|---|---|---|---|---|---|---|---|
| 8 | Panionios | 30 | 10 | 7 | 13 | 40 | 40 | 0 | 37 |
| 9 | Ergotelis | 30 | 9 | 9 | 12 | 31 | 39 | −8 | 36 |
| 10 | Iraklis | 30 | 8 | 9 | 13 | 22 | 38 | −16 | 33 (Note: Head-to-head points: Iraklis 7, Panthrakikos 6, Asteras Tripolis 2.) |
| 11 | Panthrakikos | 30 | 9 | 6 | 15 | 23 | 37 | −14 | 33 |
| 12 | Asteras Tripolis | 30 | 7 | 12 | 11 | 33 | 31 | +2 | 33 |

Source: Super League Greece
Rules for classification: 1) Points; 2) Head-to-head points; 3) Head-to-head goal difference; 4) Play-offs (neutral ground).
(Note: Criterion 4 is only used if needed to decide champion, teams for relegation or teams for UEFA competitions).

==== Results summary ====
| Overall | | | | | | | | Home | | | | | | Away | | | | | |
| Pld | W | D | L | GF | GA | GD | Pts | W | D | L | GF | GA | GD | W | D | L | GF | GA | GD |
|---|---|---|---|---|---|---|---|---|---|---|---|---|---|---|---|---|---|---|---|
| 30 | 8 | 9 | 13 | 22 | 38 | −16 | 33 | 4 | 6 | 5 | 10 | 14 | −4 | 4 | 3 | 8 | 12 | 24 | −12 |

Last updated: 26 April.
Source: iraklis-fc.gr

==== Results by round ====
| Round | 1 | 2 | 3 | 4 | 5 | 6 | 7 | 8 | 9 | 10 | 11 | 12 | 13 | 14 | 15 | 16 | 17 | 18 | 19 | 20 | 21 | 22 | 23 | 24 | 25 | 26 | 27 | 28 | 29 | 30 |
|---|---|---|---|---|---|---|---|---|---|---|---|---|---|---|---|---|---|---|---|---|---|---|---|---|---|---|---|---|---|---|
| Ground | H | H | A | H | A | H | A | H | H | A | H | A | H | A | H | A | A | H | A | H | A | H | A | A | H | A | H | A | H | A |
| Result | L | D | L | D | L | D | D | D | W | W | L | L | D | W | W | D | W | L | L | L | W | D | L | L | W | L | L | D | W | L |
| Position | 14 | 13 | 14 | 14 | 15 | 16 | 16 | 14 | 13 | 12 | 13 | 13 | 13 | 12 | 11 | 12 | 9 | 10 | 12 | 12 | 9 | 9 | 11 | 11 | 10 | 13 | 13 | 12 | 10 | 10 |

Source: iraklis-fc.gr
A = Away; H = Home; W = Win; D = Draw; L = Loss

==== Matches ====
| Date | Opponent | Venue | Result | Attendance | Scorers |
|---|---|---|---|---|---|
| 31 August 2008 | Panserraikos | H | 1-2 | 7.350 | Dié |
| 13 September 2008 | OFI | H | 1-1 | 5.010 | Garcia |
| 21 September 2008 | AEK | A | 0-1 | 17.459 | |
| 28 September 2008 | Panthrakikos | H | 0-0 | 4.543 | |
| 4 October 2008 | Aris | A | 0-1 | 13.643 | |
| 18 October 2008 | Ergotelis | H | 0-0 | 4.794 | |
| 26 October 2008 | Panathinaikos | A | 2-2 | 19.857 | Papasterianos, Ratón |
| 2 November 2008 | PAOK | H | 1-1 | 7.865 | Dié (pen.) |
| 9 November 2008 | Levadiakos | H | 1-0 | 2.790 | Kone |
| 16 November 2008 | Panionios | A | 2-0 | 4.100 | Epstein (2) |
| 22 November 2008 | Olympiacos | H | 0-3 | 9.066 | |
| 29 November 2008 | Larissa | A | 0-2 | 3.472 | |
| 7 December 2008 | Thrasyvoulos | H | 1-1 | 3.274 | Kone |
| 13 December 2008 | Asteras Tripolis | A | 2-1 | 2.235 | Epstein, Kone |
| 20 December 2008 | Skoda Xanthi | H | 1-0 | 3.104 | Konstantinou |
| 7 January 2009 | Panserraikos | A | 0-0 | 4.932 | |
| 11 January 2009 | OFI | A | 3-2 | 1.507 | Konstantinou (2), Katsabis |
| 18 January 2009 | AEK | H | 0-1 | 7.897 | |
| 25 January 2009 | Panthrakikos | A | 0-1 | 3.463 | |
| 1 February 2009 | Aris | H | 0-1 | 6.578 | |
| 8 February 2009 | Ergotelis | A | 1-0 | 2.159 | Papasterianos |
| 15 February 2009 | Panathinaikos | H | 0-0 | 6.849 | |
| 22 February 2009 | PAOK | A | 0-1 | 15.199 | |
| 1 March 2009 | Levadiakos | A | 0-3 | 2.119 | |
| 8 March 2009 | Panionios | H | 2-1 | 3.463 | Agritis, Epstein |
| 15 March 2009 | Olympiacos | A | 0-5 | 25.182 | |
| 22 March 2009 | AEL | H | 0-2 | 3.656 | |
| 5 April 2009 | Thrasyvoulos | A | 1-1 | 307 | Giantsis |
| 12 April 2009 | Asteras Tripolis | H | 2-1 | 2.705 | Psomas (o.g.), Garcia |
| 26 April 2009 | Skoda Xanthi | A | 1-4 | 1.237 | Giantsis |

== Greek Cup ==
=== Matches ===
| Date | Round | Opponent | Venue | Result | Attendance | Scorers |
|---|---|---|---|---|---|---|
| 13 November 2008 | R4 | Kastoria | A | 3-2 (a.e.t.) | - | Papasterianos, Giantsis, Ioannidis |
| 20 January 2009 | R5 | Asteras Tripolis | A | 0-2 | - | |

== Player statistics ==
- Correct as of 26 April 2009
- ¹ Denotes player has left the club. ² Denotes player joined in the January transfer window.

| No. | Pos. | Player | Apps | G | YC | RC |
|---|---|---|---|---|---|---|
| 1 | GK | (Greece) Georgios Bantis | 5 | 0 | 2 | 0 |
| 2 | DF | (Greece) Grigoris Papazaharias | 29 | 0 | 7 | 1 |
| 3 | DF | (Greece) Christos Bourbos | 15 | 0 | 5 | 1 |
| 4 | DF | (Greece) Anastasios Katsabis | 30 | 1 | 6 | 0 |
| 5 | DF | (Greece) Kostas Foufoulas | 12 | 0 | 2 | 0 |
| 6 | MF | (Ivory Coast) Serge Dié | 23 | 2 | 8 | 1 |
| 7 | FW | (Spain) Kiko Ratón | 17 | 1 | 2 | 0 |
| 8 | MF | (Spain) Francisco Martos | 19 | 0 | 4 | 0 |
| 9 | FW | (Greece) Aggelos Komvolidis | 6 | 0 | 0 | 0 |
| 10 | MF | (Spain) Fernando Marqués | 15 | 0 | 7 | 0 |
| 11 | FW | (Greece) Anestis Agritis | 20 | 1 | 3 | 0 |
| 12 | DF | (Greece) Achilleas Sarakatsanos | 17 | 0 | 7 | 0 |
| 14 | FW | (Cyprus) Michalis Konstantinou¹ | 13 | 3 | 2 | 0 |
| 15 | DF | (Greece) Savvas Exouzidis² | 3 | 0 | 0 | 0 |
| 16 | DF | (Greece) Georgios Ioannidis | 18 | 1 | 4 | 0 |
| 17 | MF | (Greece) Emmanouil Papasterianos | 28 | 3 | 7 | 0 |
| 18 | DF | (Greece) Kostas Giannoulis | 22 | 0 | 6 | 0 |
| 19 | FW | (Greece) Dimitris Giantsis | 22 | 3 | 3 | 1 |
| 20 | MF | (Argentina) Miguel Sebastian Garcia | 27 | 2 | 4 | 0 |
| 21 | MF | (Germany) Denis Epstein | 26 | 4 | 3 | 0 |
| 22 | GK | (Albania) Enea Koliçi | 0 | 0 | 0 | 0 |
| 23 | DF | (Greece) Charalabos Perperidis | 11 | 0 | 3 | 0 |
| 24 | MF | (Serbia) Aleksandar Vuković² | 10 | 0 | 1 | 0 |
| 25 | MF | (Greece) Panagiotis Kone | 27 | 3 | 7 | 1 |
| 26 | MF | (Greece) Grigoris Pitsokos | 0 | 0 | 0 | 0 |
| 27 | MF | (Greece) Dimitris Aslanidis | 0 | 0 | 0 | 0 |
| 28 | DF | (Greece) Nikolaos Psychogios | 0 | 0 | 0 | 0 |
| 29 | MF | (Greece) Georgios Moschakis | 0 | 0 | 0 | 0 |
| 30 | GK | (Poland) Wojciech Kowalewski | 26 | 0 | 4 | 0 |
| 31 | GK | (Greece) Ilias Melkas | 1 | 0 | 0 | 0 |
| 34 | MF | (Greece) Kydon Karlopoulos | 3 | 0 | 0 | 0 |
| 39 | FW | (Greece) Apostolos Vellios | 1 | 0 | 0 | 0 |

== See also ==
- Iraklis F.C. (Thessaloniki)
- List of Iraklis Thessaloniki F.C. players
- List of Iraklis F.C. seasons
- G.S. Iraklis Thessaloniki
- G.S. Iraklis Thessaloniki (men's basketball)
- Iraklis B.C. in international competitions
- G.S. Iraklis Thessaloniki (women's basketball)
- Ivanofeio Sports Arena
- G.S. Iraklis Thessaloniki (men's volleyball)
- G.S. Iraklis Thessaloniki (women's volleyball)
- G.S. Iraklis Thessaloniki (water polo)
- G.S. Iraklis Thessaloniki (rugby)
