= List of Greek football transfers summer 2010 =

This is a list of Greek football transfers in the summer transfer window 2010 by club.

== Super League ==
=== AEK Athens ===
In:

Out:

No.	Pos.	Nation	Player
2	DF	GRE	Christos Patsatzoglou (from AC Omonoia)
3	DF	ARG	Cristian Nasuti (from River Plate)
5	DF	GRE	Traianos Dellas (from Anorthosis Famagusta FC)
13	DF	URU	Claudio Dadómo (from C.A. Cerro)
17	DF	GRE	Anestis Argyriou (from Panthrakikos F.C.)
20	FW	BRA	Éder (from Asteras Tripolis F.C.)
21	MF	SEN	Papa Bouba Diop (from Portsmouth F.C.)
24	FW	AUS	Nathan Burns (loan return from Kerkyra)
33	FW	GRE	Nikos Lyberopoulos (from Eintracht Frankfurt)
25	MF	GRE	Lefteris Intzoglou (from Vyzas Megara)
28	GK	GRE	Theodoros Moschonas (promoted from Youth Team)
35	DF	GRE	Stamatis Kalamiotis (promoted from Youth Team)
93	FW	GRE	Dimitris Froxilias (promoted from Youth Team)

No.	Pos.	Nation	Player
5	DF	SWE	Daniel Majstorovic (to Celtic F.C.)
26	MF	GHA	Seidu Yahaya (released)
3	MF	ETH	Youssouf Hersi (released)
4	DF	POR	Geraldo Alves (to FC Steaua București)
6	DF	GRE	Georgios Alexopoulos (to Ergotelis F.C.)
7	DF	ESP	Juanfran (to Levante UD)
8	MF	MWI	Tam Nsaliwa (to Lillestrøm SK)
11	FW	BRA	Gustavo Manduca (to APOEL F.C.)
17	MF	FRA	Antonis Rikka (on loan to Olympiacos Volos F.C.)
29	FW	HUN	Krisztián Németh (loan return to Liverpool F.C.)
30	MF	ROU	Ilie Iordache (released)
34	MF	GRE	Panagiotis Tachtsidis (to Genoa C.F.C.)
87	DF	ARG	Nicolás Arce (loan return to San Lorenzo)
2	DF	ARG	Carlos Araujo ((at Lanús)

=== AEL ===
In:

Out:

No.	Pos.	Nation	Player
5	DF	GRE	Efstathios Tavlaridis (from AS Saint-Étienne)
82	FW	NGA	Stephen Makinwa (from S.S. Lazio)
8	DF	CMR	Geremi (from MKE Ankaragücü)
20	FW	URU	Fabián Canobbio (from Real Valladolid)
40	GK	GRE	Georgios Ambaris (from Asteras Tripolis F.C.)
6	DF	SEN	Ibrahim Tall (from FC Nantes)

No.	Pos.	Nation	Player
1	GK	SVN	Dino Seremet (released)
2	DF	GRE	Michalis Boukouvalas (released)
5	MF	GRE	Ilias Kyriakidis (released)
13	MF	SVN	Aleksandar Radosavljević (released)
14	FW	BRA	Ricardo Jesus (loan return to PFC CSKA Moscow)
15	DF	BRA	Flávio (released)
19	DF	BEL	Naïm Aarab (on loan to R. Charleroi S.C.)
45	DF	GRE	Christos Melissis (loan return to Panathinaikos F.C.)

=== Aris ===
In:

Out:

No.	Pos.	Nation	Player
3	DF	ESP	Oriol Lozano (from Racing de Santander)
8	MF	COL	Juan Carlos Toja (from FC Steaua București)
9	FW	CRO	Danijel Cesarec (from Asteras Tripolis)
11	FW	GUA	Carlos Ruiz (from Puebla F.C.)
12	GK	ESP	Juanma (from AD Alcorcón)
16	DF	BRA	Michel (from Vila Nova Futebol Clube)
17	MF	GRE	Konstantinos Kasnaferis (from PAS Giannina F.C.)
19	MF	GRE	Konstantinos Mendrinos (from PAS Giannina F.C.)
24	DF	GRE	Nikolaos Lazaridis (from Asteras Tripolis)
33	FW	LTU	Deividas Česnauskis (from Ergotelis F.C.)
21	DF	GRE	Grigoris Papazaharias (from Iraklis)

No.	Pos.	Nation	Player
3	DF	ARG	Carlos Arano (to Club Atlético River Plate)
9	MF	ARG	Darío Fernández (loan return to Beitar Jerusalem F.C.)
17	MF	FRA	Camel Meriem (released)
14	FW	USA	Eddie Johnson (loan return to Fulham F.C.)
25	DF	ESP	César Ortiz (released)
28	GK	SVK	Michal Peškovič (released)
33	FW	GRE	Stavros Labriakos (retired)
30	MF	ARG	Roberto Battión (to Club Atlético Independiente, previously on loan to Club Atlético Banfield)
18	FW	ARG	Javier Cámpora (to Colo-Colo)
88	MF	BOL	Ronald García (to Anorthosis Famagusta FC)

=== Asteras Tripolis ===
In:

Out:

No.	Pos.	Nation	Player
9	FW	BRA	Roberto (from Vitória S.C.)
11	MF	GRE	Savvas Tsabouris (from Egaleo F.C.)
20	MF	CRO	Goran Rubil (from HNK Hajduk Split)
21	MF	ALG	Salim Arrache (from PAS Giannina F.C.)
7	MF	SCO	Mark Kerr (from Aberdeen F.C.)
24	DF	ESP	Daniel Orozco (from Málaga CF)

No.	Pos.	Nation	Player
7	MF	ARG	Israel Damonte (released)
9	FW	CRO	Danijel Cesarec (to Aris Thessaloniki F.C.)
21	MF	GRE	Efstathios Rokas (to Olympiacos Volos F.C.)
23	MF	ARG	Sebastián Carrera (to Arsenal de Sarandí)
24	DF	GRE	Nikolaos Lazaridis (to Aris Thessaloniki F.C.)
33	DF	BRA	Marcelão (to Al-Sharjah Sports Club)
40	GK	GRE	Georgios Ambaris (to AEL)
99	FW	GRE	Vaggelis Kaounos (to Panetolikos F.C.)
8	MF	ARG	Horacio Ramón Cardozo (released)

=== Atromitos ===
In:

Out:

No.	Pos.	Nation	Player
39	FW	CRO	Zdravko Popović (loan return from OFI)
5	DF	SEN	Massamba Sambou (from AS Monaco, previously on loan to FC Nantes)
7	FW	SEN	Henri Camara (from Sheffield United F.C.)

No.	Pos.	Nation	Player
77	MF	GRE	Panagiotis Korbos (on loan to Trikala F.C.)
27	DF	ARG	Carlos Alberto Massara (on loan to Diagoras F.C.)
5	DF	ARG	Juan Carlos Blengio (loan return to Club Atlético Tigre)

=== Ergotelis ===
In:

Out:

No.	Pos.	Nation	Player
99	FW	NGA	Patrick Ogunsoto (loan return from OFI)
4	DF	GRE	Georgios Alexopoulos (from AEK Athens F.C.)
23	MF	NGA	Egutu Oliseh (from Panthrakikos F.C.)

No.	Pos.	Nation	Player
3	DF	GRE	Dimitrios Geladaris (to Doxa Drama F.C.)
4	MF	GRE	Sotiris Balafas (loan return to PAOK FC)
6	DF	GRE	Panagiotis Κordonouris (retired)
23	MF	GRE	Dimitrios Kiliaras (loan return to Panionios F.C.)
25	GK	HUN	Zsolt Posza (to Doxa Katokopia)
33	FW	LTU	Deividas Česnauskis (to Aris Thessaloniki F.C.)

=== Iraklis ===
In:

Out:

No.	Pos.	Nation	Player
--	DF	CZE	Jiří Krejčí (from FK Baumit Jablonec)
--	MF	CAN	Gianluca Zavarise (from VfL Bochum)
--	MF	POL	Robert Szczot (from Górnik Zabrze)
--	DF	GRE	Petros Kanakoudis (from PAS Giannina F.C.)
--	DF	NGA	Abraham Alechenwu (from KF Tirana)
--	FW	ALG	Karim Soltani (from ADO Den Haag)
--	DF	GRE	Nikos Arabatzis (from PAOK)
--	DF	GRE	Georgios Kyriazis (from Salernitana)
--	DF	URU	Pablo Lima (from Vélez Sársfield)
--	GK	GRE	Dimitrios Eleftheropoulos (from PAS Giannina F.C.)
--	DF	ESP	Josemi (from Mallorca)

No.	Pos.	Nation	Player
4	MF	GRE	Georgios Ioannidis (to Panathinaikos F.C.)
18	DF	GRE	Kostas Giannoulis (to 1. FC Köln)
21	DF	GRE	Grigoris Papazaharias (to Aris Thessaloniki)
22	MF	ARG	Lucas Rimoldi (to All Boys)
26	MF	GER	Denis Epstein (to Olympiacos F.C.)
66	GK	POR	Daniel Fernandes (loan return to VfL Bochum)
6	DF	POR	André Marques (to S.C. Beira-Mar)
23	DF	GRE	Charalabos Perperidis (to Doxa Drama F.C.)
19	FW	GRE	Dimitris Giantsis (to Kerkyra)
12	FW	CRO	Ivan Bošnjak (released)

=== Kavala ===
In:

Out:

No.	Pos.	Nation	Player
--	GK	ESP	Javier López Vallejo (from Levadiakos F.C.)
--	DF	BUL	Igor Tomašić (from Maccabi Tel Aviv F.C.)
--	MF	ALG	Djamel Abdoun (from FC Nantes)

No.	Pos.	Nation	Player
7	MF	AUT	Aleksandar Popović (released)
10	MF	NGA	Wilson Oruma (released)
15	MF	SEN	Frédéric Mendy (to Stade Lavallois)
17	DF	SRB	Ivan Gvozdenović (released)
20	FW	POL	Łukasz Sosin (released)
30	GK	FRA	Charles Itandje (loan return to Liverpool F.C.)
8	MF	GRE	Sotiris Leontiou (loan return to Panathinaikos F.C.)
9	FW	POL	Ebi Smolarek (to Polonia Warszawa)
16	FW	BRA	Denílson (released)
6	MF	CYP	Siniša Dobrasinović (to Alki Larnaca F.C.)
22	DF	GRE	Manolis Psomas (to OFI)
3	DF	AUS	Craig Moore (retired)

=== Kerkyra ===
In:

Out:

No.	Pos.	Nation	Player
6	MF	GRE	Ieroklis Stoltidis (from Olympiacos F.C.)
19	DF	CRO	Ivica Majstorović (from PAS Giannina F.C.)
12	FW	GRE	Dimitris Giantsis (from Iraklis)
23	GK	GRE	Dimitrios Konstantopoulos (from Coventry City F.C.)
26	MF	GER	Denis Epstein (on loan from Olympiacos)

No.	Pos.	Nation	Player
3	DF	GRE	Nikos Boutzikos (loan return to Panathinaikos F.C.)
8	DF	FRA	Fabrice Reuperne (retired)
16	FW	RSA	Bally Smart (released)
21	DF	CYP	Giorgos Pelagias (released)
50	FW	POR	Luis Lourenço (released)
99	FW	BRA	Israel Silva (released)

=== Olympiacos ===
In:

Out:

No.	Pos.	Nation	Player
3	DF	FRA	François Modesto (from AS Monaco)
7	MF	ARG	Ariel Ibagaza (from Villarreal CF)
9	FW	SRB	Marko Pantelić (from Ajax FC)
14	FW	BEL	Kevin Mirallas (on loan from AS Saint-Étienne)
19	MF	BRA	Wanderson (promoted from Youth Team)
20	DF	GER	José Holebas (from TSV 1860 München)
24	MF	DEN	Dennis Rommedahl (from Ajax FC)
26	MF	GER	Denis Epstein (from Iraklis)
42	GK	HUN	Balázs Megyeri (from Ferencvárosi TC)
77	MF	ESP	Albert Riera (from Liverpool F.C.)
88	MF	GRE	Georgios Katsikogiannis (loan return from OFI)

No.	Pos.	Nation	Player
1	GK	GRE	Leonidas Panagopoulos (to Panionios)
2	DF	GRE	Kyriakos Papadopoulos (to FC Schalke 04)
3	DF	FRA	Didier Domi (released)
6	MF	GRE	Ieroklis Stoltidis (to Kerkyra)
7	MF	ARG	Luciano Galletti (retired)
14	DF	POL	Michał Żewłakow (to Ankaragücü)
19	MF	ARG	Jesús Dátolo (loan return to S.S.C. Napoli)
24	DF	BRA	Leonardo (on loan to Sport Club Internacional)
28	MF	ARG	Cristian Ledesma (to Club Atlético Colón)
30	DF	GRE	Anastasios Pantos (to PAS Giannina F.C.)
32	FW	COD	Lomana LuaLua (to AC Omonia)
26	MF	GER	Denis Epstein (on loan to Kerkyra)
50	GK	SVK	Pavel Kováč (to Kavala F.C.)
--	MF	BRA	Chumbinho (on loan to Panserraikos F.C.)
--	DF	GRE	Tasos Papazoglou (on loan to Panserraikos F.C.)

=== Olympiacos Volos ===
In:

Out:

No.	Pos.	Nation	Player
4	DF	FRA	Xavier Tomas (from Tours FC)
5	MF	ARG	Facundo Pérez Castro (from Arsenal de Sarandí)
6	MF	FRA	Antonis Rikka (from AEK Athens F.C.)
21	MF	GRE	Efstathios Rokas (from Asteras Tripolis)
25	DF	HUN	Zoltán Szélesi (from Debreceni VSC)
86	GK	ALB	Enea Koliqi (from Iraklis)

No.	Pos.	Nation	Player
1	GK	GRE	Fotis Kipouros (to PAS Giannina F.C.)
4	DF	GER	Erol Bulut (released)
14	MF	GRE	Kydon Karlopoulos (to Doxa Drama F.C.)
21	FW	CRO	Domagoj Abramović (to OFI)
10	FW	GRE	Dimitris Sialmas (loan return to PAS Giannina F.C.)
--	DF	GRE	Kostas Foufoulas (to Ilioupoli F.C.)

=== Panathinaikos ===
In:

Out:

No.	Pos.	Nation	Player
4	DF	FRA	Jean-Alain Boumsong (from Olympique Lyonnais)
8	DF	GRE	Georgios Ioannidis (from Iraklis)
10	FW	FRA	Sidney Govou (from Olympique Lyonnais)
14	MF	ESP	Luis García (from Racing Santander)
19	MF	FRA	Damien Plessis (from Liverpool F.C.)
21	MF	ALB	Elini Dimoutsos (loan return from Panetolikos F.C.)
35	MF	GRE	Charalampos Mavrias (promoted from Youth Team)
66	GK	POR	Daniel Fernandes (on loan from VfL Bochum)

No.	Pos.	Nation	Player
5	FW	CRO	Ante Rukavina (to NK Dinamo Zagreb)
14	FW	GRE	Dimitris Salpingidis (to PAOK)
21	DF	GRE	Filippos Darlas (to Stade Brestois 29)
--	MF	GRE	Sotiris Leontiou (on loan to Ilioupoli F.C.)
--	DF	GRE	Christos Melissis (on loan to C.S. Marítimo)
--	FW	GRE	Evangelos Mantzios (on loan to C.S. Marítimo)
--	DF	RSA	Nasief Morris (released)

=== Panionios ===
In:

Out:

No.	Pos.	Nation	Player
39	FW	POR	Ricardo Vaz Tê (from Bolton Wanderers F.C.)
77	GK	AUT	Jürgen Macho (from LASK Linz)
87	GK	GRE	Leonidas Panagopoulos (from Olympiacos F.C.)
28	FW	ALG	Mohamed Chalali (from LB Châteauroux)
7	MF	DEN	Kasper Risgård (from Arminia Bielefeld)

No.	Pos.	Nation	Player
12	GK	GRE	Konstantinos Andriolas (to Panthrakikos F.C.)
7	MF	GRE	Manolis Skoufalis (to PAS Giannina F.C.)
28	MF	CYP	Marios Nicolaou (to AEL Limassol)
31	DF	GRE	Georgios Tzavelas (to Eintracht Frankfurt)
35	DF	FIN	Mehmet Hetemaj (to U.C. AlbinoLeffe, previously on loan)

=== Panserraikos ===
In:

Out:

No.	Pos.	Nation	Player
1	GK	SVK	Jan Novota (from FK DAC 1904 Dunajská Streda)
3	DF	ESP	Pablo Amo (from Real Zaragoza)
6	MF	GRE	Kostas Triantafyllou (promoted from Youth Team)
8	MF	SRB	Nikola Beljić (from OFK Beograd)
9	FW	CRO	Bojan Vručina (from Hapoel Tel Aviv F.C.)
11	DF	GRE	Thanasis Panteliadis (from Pierikos)
12	DF	GRE	Nikos Savvidis (from Ethnikos Katerini F.C.)
14	DF	POR	Jordao Diogo (on loan from KR Reykjavik)
15	MF	PAR	Jorge Brítez (from Cerro Porteño)
18	FW	FRA	Maurice Dalé (on loan from FC Unirea Urziceni)
20	DF	FRA	Youl Mawene (from Preston North End F.C.)
21	FW	GRE	Nikos Aslanidis (promoted from Youth Team)
23	DF	GRE	Anastasios Papazoglou (on loan from Olympiacos)
24	MF	GRE	Kostas Mousikakis (from Megas Alexandros Irakleia F.C.)
25	MF	BRA	Chumbinho (on loan from Olympiacos)
27	DF	URU	Pablo Álvarez (from Reggina)
28	MF	GHA	Mohammed Abubakari (on loan from PAOK)
30	GK	CRO	Velimir Radman (from NK Rijeka)
31	MF	GRE	Nikolaos Vlasopoulos (free transfer)

No.	Pos.	Nation	Player
1	GK	GRE	Dimitris Kyriakidis (loan return to PAOK)
3	DF	FRA	Cyril Kali (released)
6	DF	GRE	Giannis Zapropoulos (released)
8	DF	FRA	Bark Seghiri (released)
11	DF	GRE	Tasos Pagonis (released)
15	GK	GRE	Christos Vozikis (on loan to Megas Alexandros Irakleia F.C.)
16	MF	ARG	Lucas Scaglia (released)
20	FW	GRE	Sotiris Konstantinidis (released)
21	DF	GRE	Vangelis Georgiou (loan return to PAOK)
24	MF	GRE	Charis Gaitatzis (released)
25	MF	GRE	Christos Routsis (to Doxa Drama F.C.)
27	FW	ARG	Angel Guillermo Bochy Hoyos (released)
28	FW	GRE	Stefanos Athanasiadis (loan return to PAOK)
31	FW	LTU	Valdas Trakys (released)
32	DF	GRE	Alexis Michail (loan return to PAS Giannina F.C.)
33	DF	GRE	Nikos Zapropoulos (to Levadiakos F.C.)
40	GK	GRE	Giannis Fysekis (to Ethnikos Alexandroupolis)
41	GK	GRE	Dimitrios Kottaras (to Ethnikos Asteras F.C.)
97	FW	GRE	Dimitrios Gkourtsas (on loan to Anagennisi Giannitsa F.C.)

=== PAOK ===
In:

Out:

No.	Pos.	Nation	Player
3	DF	TUN	Anis Boussaidi (from FC Red Bull Salzburg)
4	MF	GRE	Sotiris Balafas (loan return from Ergotelis F.C.)
37	DF	GRE	Vangelis Georgiou (loan return from Panserraikos F.C.)
9	FW	GRE	Dimitris Salpingidis (from Panathinaikos F.C.)
33	FW	GRE	Stefanos Athanasiadis (loan return from Panserraikos F.C.)
42	DF	POR	Francisco Zuela (on loan from FC Kuban Krasnodar)
2	DF	GRE	Lefteris Sakellariou (from Panthrakikos F.C.)
50	GK	GRE	Asterios Giakoumis (from Agrotikos Asteras F.C.)
7	MF	MAR	Nabil El Zhar (on loan from Liverpool F.C.)

No.	Pos.	Nation	Player
2	DF	GRE	Nikos Arabatzis (to Iraklis)
3	DF	RSA	Bryce Moon (loan return to Panathinaikos F.C.)
9	FW	POR	Edinho (loan return to Málaga CF)
22	MF	ARG	Ricardo Matias Verón (to OFI)
28	MF	GHA	Mohammed Abubakari (on loan to Panserraikos F.C., previously on loan to Levadiakos F.C.)
10	MF	FRA	Olivier Sorlin (released)
71	GK	GRE	Panagiotis Glikos (on loan to Agrotikos Asteras F.C.)

=== Skoda Xanthi ===
In:

Out:

No.	Pos.	Nation	Player
3	DF	ENG	Jordan Stewart (from Sheffield United F.C.)
10	FW	ZAM	Christopher Katongo (from Arminia Bielefeld)
1	GK	GRE	Spyros Vrontaras (from Panthrakikos F.C.)
13	DF	NGA	Olubayo Adefemi (from US Boulogne)
88	FW	CRO	Marjan Altiparmakovski (from FK Pelister)
20	MF	NED	George Boateng (from Hull City A.F.C.)

No.	Pos.	Nation	Player
4	DF	GRE	Stavros Tziortziopoulos (released)
5	DF	GRE	Giannis Papadimitriou (retired)
6	DF	GRE	Manolis Liapakis (to OFI)
8	MF	BRA	Luciano (released)
10	FW	JOR	Odai Al-Saify (to Alki Larnaca F.C.)
14	MF	GRE	Pantelis Rizogiannis (on loan to Trikala F.C.)
17	MF	CRO	Marko Marić (released)
25	MF	NGA	Yakubu Alfa (released)
30	MF	ROU	Florin Stângă (to FCM Târgu Mureş)
33	FW	POL	Rafał Grzelak (Widzew Łódź, previously on loan to FC Steaua București)
