= Apostolos Vellios =

Greek footballer (born 1992)

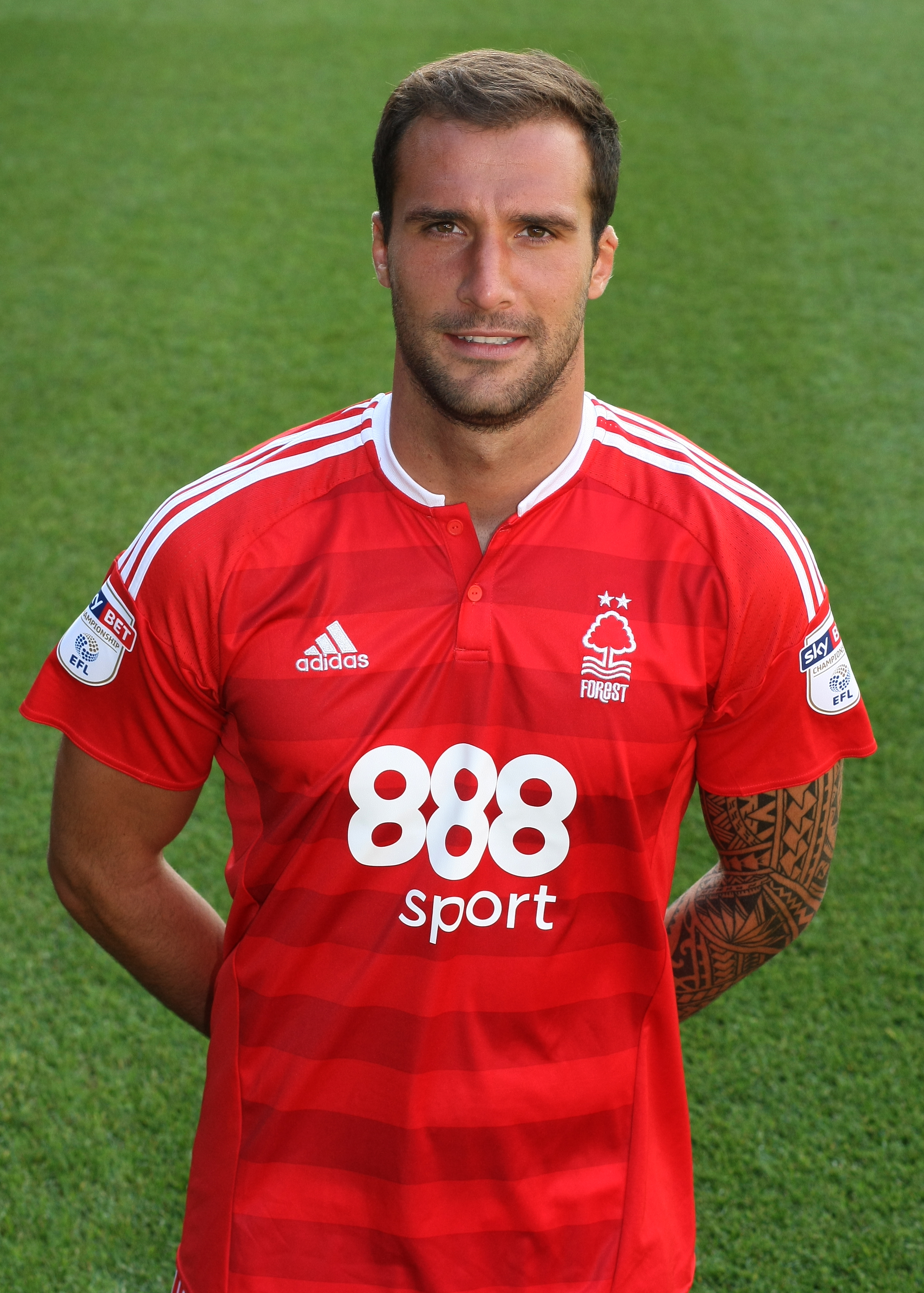
- Vellios with Nottingham Forest in 2016

Personal information
- Date of birth: 8 January 1992 (age 34)
- Place of birth: Thessaloniki, Greece
- Height: 1.91 m (6 ft 3 in)
- Position: Striker

Team information
- Current team: SJK
- Number: 27

Youth career
- 2003–2008: Iraklis

Senior career*
| Years | Team | Apps | (Gls) |
| 2008–2011 | Iraklis | 21 | (4) |
| 2011–2014 | Everton | 22 | (3) |
| 2014 | → Blackpool (loan) | 2 | (0) |
| 2014–2015 | Lierse | 13 | (1) |
| 2015 | → Vestsjælland | 16 | (3) |
| 2015–2016 | Iraklis | 27 | (11) |
| 2016–2019 | Nottingham Forest | 40 | (7) |
| 2018–2019 | → Waasland–Beveren | 17 | (4) |
| 2019–2020 | Atromitos | 27 | (6) |
| 2020–2021 | Ascoli | 7 | (0) |
| 2021–2022 | Academica Clinceni | 16 | (1) |
| 2022 | Lamia | 9 | (0) |
| 2022–2024 | PEC Zwolle | 59 | (14) |
| 2024–2025 | Nea Salamina | 31 | (7) |
| 2025–2026 | Niki Volos | 9 | (3) |
| 2026– | SJK | 7 | (1) |

International career^{‡}
| 2008–2009 | Greece U17 | 3 | (0) |
| 2009–2011 | Greece U19 | 17 | (9) |
| 2011–2014 | Greece U21 | 24 | (4) |
| 2016–2017 | Greece | 8 | (0) |
- * Club domestic league appearances and goals as of 13 November 2026 ‡ National team caps and goals as of 2 August 2025

Apostolos Vellios (Greek: Απόστολος Βέλλιος; born 8 January 1992) is a Greek professional footballer who plays as a striker for Veikkausliiga club SJK.

== Club career ==
=== Iraklis ===
Vellios started his professional career at Iraklis in 2008. He made his debut against in a 4–1 away defeat by Skoda Xanthi on 26 April 2009, as he came in as a late substitute for Dimitris Giantsis, for the last round of the 2008–09 season. His first goal was an equalizer in injury time against Olympiacos in Karaiskakis Stadium on 7 November 2009, to help Iraklis escape with an away draw against the Greek giants. He was named MVP of the 10th round of the Greek Super League for his performance in that match. At the end of the season, he totalled nine appearances for the club, all as a substitute, and two goals.

=== Everton ===
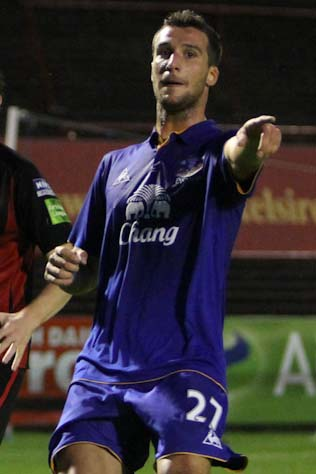

Following interest from Fulham, Olympiacos, AEK Athens, and Bologna, Vellios signed for Everton in January 2011 for a fee of £250,000 on a 4-year deal. Vellios scored Everton Reserves' only goal in his debut, as they suffered a 5–1 home defeat against Blackburn Rovers Reserves. Vellios made his first-team debut for Everton against Aston Villa in the Premier League, on 2 April 2011, replacing Jermaine Beckford after 80 minutes. He scored his first goal for the first team in a home 3–1 win against Wigan Athletic on 17 September 2011. His second goal was scored away against Chelsea after being on the pitch for only 18 seconds, 8 seconds from play being restarted, in a 3–1 defeat at Stamford Bridge. Once again he appeared as a substitute away at Bolton Wanderers, he scored with a right footed shot to make it 2–0, making it his third goal for Everton after playing just 235 minutes on the pitch.

However, he was subsequently completely dropped from the squad by Moyes and pushed into the reserves despite being the top scorer. At the time of his Everton career, Velios mainly played for Everton Reserves, however still holding the Premier League statistic of a goal every 86 minutes, still the highest rate at Everton during 2011–2012 season. He made his 2012/13 first team debut by coming on as a sub against Sunderland, which Everton won 2–1 with Marouane Fellaini and Nikica Jelavic getting the goals for the Toffees. On 10 May 2014, after 3 1/2 years with the Toffees, Vellios announced his removal from the club on Twitter. Throughout these years did not succeed to be one of the regulars of the club. "I would like to thank Everton for these three and a half years of my life, but mostly I have a big thanks for the supporters. You will be forever in my heart" he stated.

==== Loan to Blackpool ====
In March 2014, Vellios joined Blackpool on loan for the remainder of the season. He was given a starting debut at Queens Park Rangers on 29 March, but in the next match — a 2–1 home defeat to Yeovil Town — he was substituted five minutes into the second half and did not feature again.

=== Lierse ===
In July 2014 Vellios signed a two-year contract with Jupiler League club Lierse.

==== Loan to Vestsjælland ====
On 26 January 2015 Vellios was loaned to FC Vestsjælland until 1 July. He became the first ever Greek footballer to play in the Danish Superliga. He played 16 games, and scored 3 goals for the club, in the Superliga. But he also manages to score 3 goals in 4 games in the Danish Cup, including a goal in the final against F.C. Copenhagen, a game FC Vestsjælland lost 2–3, after extra time.

=== Return to Iraklis ===
On 15 July 2015 Vellios signed a two-year contract with Iraklis. On 26 September 2015, he equalised for the final score of 1–1 from a Costin Lazăr assist on the fifth day of the Greek Super League against Skoda Xanthi. It was his first goal with Iraklis after his return to the club.

On 26 October 2015, he scored in a record fourth consecutive Super League match in 2015, equalizing Joël Epalle's club decade record. On 17 November 2015, Vellios stood alongside Nikos Kyzeridis, giving his jersey for fundraising, thereby demonstrating support for the former Aris player struggling with cancer. On 28 November 2015, he netted the only goal in a 1–0 home win against giants Panathinaikos for the Greek Super League. On 5 December 2015, he scored in the 2–1 home win against Asteras Tripolis, helping his club to maintain its unbeaten run against the Arcadian club. Since then, Vellios has been linked to Greek giants, Olympiacos, and also PAOK. On 2 January 2016, a hat-trick by Vellios led Iraklis to a 3–0 home win over AEL Kalloni becoming the first Iraklis player to achieve this feat in the last 15 years. On 7 February 2016, Vellios' 10th Super League goal helped his club to win 1–0 PAS Giannina at Kaftanzogleio Stadium. It was the first victory for Nikos Papadopoulos' team after six negative results. He scored his eleventh goal with a header during a home game against Veria.

=== Nottingham Forest ===
On 29 June 2016, it was announced that Vellios had signed a four-year contract with Championship club Nottingham Forest for a reported £950,000, and became the first signing under new head coach Philippe Montanier. On 12 August, he made his debut with the club as a late substitute in a 3–0 away loss against Brighton & Hove Albion. Eight days later, having come on as an early substitute for Britt Assombalonga, his penalty was saved in a 4–3 home win against Wigan Athletic in the Championship. On 11 September, he netted his first Forest goal, putting his side ahead with a 25-yard strike in a 2–2 away draw against Aston Villa. Three days later he scored with an overhead kick, giving a short lead to his club in a 2–2 away draw against Rotherham United. Vellios scored in his third match running as Nottingham Forest lost 1–2 to Norwich City on 17 September.

On 1 October, Vellios gave the visitors an early lead at Ashton Gate for his fourth goal of the season in a 2–1 away loss against Bristol City. In a poll published by the Nottingham Post on 4 October, Forest fans chose Vellios as the best player of the team until that moment, with 39% of the voters picking him. On 14 October Vellios netted the second goal from Lansbury's cross in a 3–1 home win against Birmingham City.

Despite his overall performance, Vellios' participation during the 2017-18 Championship season was limited; after he was left out of Mark Warburton's squad for a match at Birmingham City on 18 November 2017, a match which Forest lost, his father, Kostas Vellios, made a post on Facebook describing his continued omission as "disgusting". He was told by Warburton that he was free to find a new club in the January transfer window, although Warburton's successor, Aitor Karanka, wanted time to assess the players. On 27 January, Vellios came off the bench ten minutes before the end of the game and scored his first goal of the season in a 2–1 loss to Hull City in the FA Cup. He stayed for the second half of the season, but was mainly used as a late substitute. On 24 April 2018, he scored his first goal of the 2017–18 Championship, the third in a 3–0 home win against Barnsley.

==== Loan to Waasland-Beveren ====
Vellios did not form part of Karanka's plans for 2018–19, and on 31 August 2018, he signed for Waasland-Beveren of the Belgian First Division A on a season-long loan. On 29 September he scored his first goal of the season with a header in a 3–0 away win against Mouscron. On 19 October 2018, he scored his second of the 2018–19 Belgian First Division A season, equalising after an hour of the visit to Club Brugge. On 24 November 2018, Vellios scored his third goal of the season, against Mouscron in a 2–1 home loss. On 15 December 2018, he scored in the last minute of the match as a late substitute, sealing a 2–0 away win against Royal Antwerp.

=== Atromitos ===
On 21 June 2019, he agreed to join Atromitos on a two-year contract. He scored his first goal for the club on 1 September with a spectacular overhead kick to secure a 2–2 draw away to Lamia. On 14 September he scored twice as Atromitos lost 3–2 at home to champions PAOK. On 27 October 2019, he scored with a low shot in an emphatic 4–0 home win against Panionios. On 8 December 2019, Vellios opened the scoring for the home side with a wonderful bicycle kick, after 24 minutes in new coach Savvas Pantelidis’ first game in charge, in a 2–2 home draw against Aris. On 18 December 2019, he scored a late header from Javier Umbides’ cross five minutes from full-time salvaged the home draw for Atromitos against Lamia.

On 7 January 2020, he scored a brace in an emphatic 3–0 away win against Volos in the first leg of the round of 16 of the Greek Cup. On 29 June 2020, Vellios' spectacular effort against Lamia for Atromitos has been named the Goal of the Season in the 2019–20 regular season.

=== Ascoli, Academica Clinceni and Lamia ===
On 24 September 2020, he signed a two-year contract with Italian Serie B club Ascoli. On 7 July 2021, he moved to Romanian club Academica Clinceni on a two-year contract. Vellios returned to Greece in January 2022, signing with Lamia.

=== PEC Zwolle ===
On 6 July 2022, Vellios signed a one-year contract with recently relegated Dutch Eerste Divisie club PEC Zwolle, with an option for an additional year. He made his debut for the club on 7 August, immediately scoring the decisive goal in a 2–1 league win against De Graafschap. On 3 March 2023, Vellios scored a hat-trick in the 14 first minutes, and four goals total, in a record-tying 13–0 league victory over FC Den Bosch. His hat-trick was also a record for fastest hat-trick ever in Eerste Divisie history. The team has been promoted to the Eredivisie as the champion of the series.

== International career ==
Vellios has been capped 16 times for the Greek U-19 team and has scored 9 goals for them. His last appearances to date, with Greece U-19, was in the two friendly matches against Macedonia U-19 in January 2011. The first was a 2–1 win for Greece U-19, a game in which Vellios scored the opening goal. The other match was contested two days later and Vellios managed to score twice, in a match that Greece U-19 won by a 3–0 scoreline. On 16 March 2016 Vellios was called for the first time to play for the Greece national football team in two friendly matches against Iceland and Montenegro.

== Personal life ==
Vellios is the son of Kostas Vellios, former footballer of Iraklis. He was a student at Aristotelio High School and, on 18 March 2010, by playing for the school team he was crowned champion in the Greek High School Championship. Vellios is also known for being a lifelong supporter of Iraklis.

== Career statistics ==
=== Club ===
As of match played 18 December 2023

Appearances and goals by club, season and competition
| Club | Season | League | | | National cup | | League cup | | Continental | | Total | |
| Club | Season | Division | Apps | Goals | Apps | Goals | Apps | Goals | Apps | Goals | Apps | Goals |
|---|---|---|---|---|---|---|---|---|---|---|---|---|
| Iraklis | 2008–09 | Super League Greece | 1 | 0 | 0 | 0 | — | | — | | 1 | 0 |
| Iraklis | 2009–10 | Super League Greece | 9 | 2 | 0 | 0 | — | | — | | 40 | 3 |
| Iraklis | 2010–11 | Super League Greece | 12 | 2 | 0 | 0 | — | | — | | 38 | 3 |
| Iraklis | Total | | 22 | 4 | 0 | 0 | — | | — | | 22 | 4 |
| Everton | 2010–11 | Premier League | 3 | 0 | 0 | 0 | 0 | 0 | — | | 3 | 0 |
| Everton | 2011–12 | Premier League | 13 | 3 | 1 | 0 | 1 | 0 | — | | 15 | 3 |
| Everton | 2012–13 | Premier League | 6 | 0 | 0 | 0 | 0 | 0 | — | | 6 | 0 |
| Everton | 2013–14 | Premier League | 0 | 0 | 0 | 0 | 0 | 0 | — | | 0 | 0 |
| Everton | Total | | 22 | 3 | 1 | 0 | 1 | 0 | — | | 24 | 3 |
| Blackpool (loan) | 2013–14 | Championship | 2 | 0 | 0 | 0 | 0 | 0 | — | | 2 | 0 |
| Lierse | 2014–15 | Belgian Pro League | 13 | 1 | 1 | 0 | — | | — | | 14 | 1 |
| FC Vestsjælland (loan) | 2014–15 | Danish Superliga | 16 | 3 | 4 | 3 | — | | — | | 20 | 6 |
| Iraklis | 2015–16 | Super League Greece | 27 | 11 | 5 | 2 | — | | — | | 32 | 13 |
| Nottingham Forest | 2016–17 | Championship | 28 | 6 | 1 | 0 | 2 | 0 | — | | 31 | 6 |
| Nottingham Forest | 2017–18 | Championship | 12 | 1 | 1 | 1 | 1 | 0 | — | | 14 | 2 |
| Nottingham Forest | Total | | 40 | 7 | 2 | 1 | 3 | 0 | — | | 45 | 8 |
| Waasland-Beveren | 2018–19 | Belgian First Division A | 17 | 4 | 1 | 0 | — | | — | | 18 | 4 |
| Atromitos | 2019–20 | Super League Greece | 25 | 6 | 4 | 2 | — | | 4 | 0 | 33 | 8 |
| Ascoli | 2020-21 | Serie B | 7 | 0 | 1 | 0 | — | | — | | 8 | 0 |
| Academica Clinceni | 2021-22 | Romanian Liga I | 16 | 1 | 0 | 0 | — | | — | | 16 | 1 |
| Lamia | 2021–22 | Super League Greece | 9 | 0 | 0 | 0 | — | | — | | 9 | 0 |
| PEC Zwolle | 2022–23 | Eerste Divisie | 31 | 11 | 1 | 1 | — | | — | | 32 | 12 |
| PEC Zwolle | 2023–24 | Eerste Divisie | 14 | 3 | 1 | 0 | — | | — | | 15 | 3 |
| Career total | | | 261 | 54 | 21 | 9 | 4 | 0 | 4 | 0 | 290 | 63 |

=== International ===
As of match played 31 August 2018

Appearances and goals by national team and year
| National team | Year | Apps | Goals |
|---|---|---|---|
| Greece | 2016 | 5 | 0 |
| Greece | 2017 | 3 | 0 |
| Total | | 8 | 0 |

== Honours ==
=== Vestsjælland ===
- Danish Cup: runner-up 2014–15
- Eerste Divisie: 1st place 2022–2023
