= Carlinhos (footballer, born 1984) =

Brazilian footballer

Personal information
- Full name: Carlos César Matheus
- Date of birth: August 2, 1984 (age 42)
- Place of birth: Taquaritinga, Brazil
- Height: 1.82 m (6 ft 0 in)
- Position: Defensive midfielder

Team information
- Current team: Operário-Campo Grande

Youth career
- 1999–2000: Flamengo

Senior career*
Years	Team	Apps	(Gls)
2001	América-SP		
2002–2005	São Paulo		
2005–2006	Guarani		
2006–2009	Figueirense		
2010–2011	Iraklis		
2012	Central		
2012	Marília		
2012–2013	Bragantino		
2014–2015	Mirassol		
2016	Confiança		
2016	Nacional-AM		
2017–	Operário-MS		
- * Club domestic league appearances and goals as of 24 January 2011

Carlos César Matheus or simply Carlinhos (born August 2, 1984 in Taquaritinga), is a Brazilian defensive midfielder who currently plays for Bragantino. He spent most of his career in Brazil, playing for América-SP, São Paulo, Guarani and Figueirense before, in January 2010, moving to Super League Greece club Iraklis.

== Club ==
=== Brazil ===
Carlinhos started his carre in the youth ranks of Flamengo. He has played professional football for América-SP, São Paulo, Guarani and Figueirense.

=== Iraklis ===
On 26 January 2010, he signed a 1.5-year contract with Iraklis. Carlnhos debuted for Giraios 14 February 2010, in an away 0-0 draw against Panionios, as he came in as an 81st-minute substitute for Panagiotis Kone. Until the end of the season he played in 5 more matches, to reach a total of six appearances in his first season for the club. He was a starter for Iraklis in the club's first match for the 2010-2011 season, a 2-1 win versus Olympiacos. He continued appearing almost regularly for Iraklis throughout the season, but in January he sustained a groin injury.

== Achievements ==
São Paulo

- Campeonato Paulista (1): 2005

Figueirense

- Campeonato Catarinense (1): 2008
