= Fredy Vera =

Paraguayan footballer (born 1986)

Personal information
- Full name: Fredy Agustín Vera Fernández
- Date of birth: 15 January 1986 (age 40)
- Place of birth: Asunción, Paraguay
- Height: 1.86 m (6 ft 1 in)
- Position: Centre back

Team information
- Current team: Sol de América Asunción

Senior career*
Years	Team	Apps	(Gls)
2005–2006	Club Rubio Ñu	11	(0)
2007	Tacuary	5	(0)
2008–2013	Club Rubio Ñu	89	(11)
2010	→ Iraklis Thessaloniki (loan)	2	(0)
2012	→ Club Sport Colombia (loan)	30	(3)
2014	Sol de América Asunción		
2015	Sportivo San Lorenzo Squad		
2023	12 de Octubre Squad		
- * Club domestic league appearances and goals

Fredy Agustín Vera Fernández (born 15 January 1986 in Asunción, Paraguay) is a Paraguayan football defender, who plays for Club Sol de América.

Vera began playing for the Libertad reserves before being signed by Rubio Ñú in 2009. He joined Greek side Iraklis on loan in February 2010.

In 2023 Vera played one match for Club 12 de Octubre.
