= Mauro Milano =

Argentine footballer (born 1984)

Personal information
- Full name: Mauro Ramiro Milano
- Date of birth: 18 January 1984 (age 42)
- Place of birth: Buenos Aires, Argentina
- Height: 1.68 m (5 ft 6 in)
- Position: Midfielder

Senior career*
Years	Team	Apps	(Gls)
2002–2007	Huracán	118	(24)
2005	→ Querétaro FC (loan)	15	(3)
2007–2009	Asteras Tripolis	9	(4)
2009–2011	Iraklis	20	(4)
2011	Defensa y Justicia	5	(0)
2011–2014	Huracán	75	(11)
2014–2015	San Martín (SJ)	13	(2)
2016–2017	All Boys	29	(5)
2018–2019	Royal Pari	67	(20)
- * Club domestic league appearances and goals as of 23:52, 21 December 2020 (UTC)

Mauro Ramiro Milano (born 18 January 1984 in Buenos Aires) is an Argentinean football midfielder and striker.

== Career ==
Milano made his debut in Argentina's Primera División as a player for Club Atlético Huracán. He was later transferred to Asteras Tripolis of Super League Greece. After two years in Tripoli, he accepted an offer from Iraklis. He signed a two-year contract with Iraklis on 6 July 2009.
