= Manolis Papasterianos =

Greek footballer (born 1987)

Personal information
- Full name: Emmanouil Papasterianos
- Date of birth: 15 August 1987 (age 39)
- Place of birth: Ierissos, Greece
- Height: 1.79 m (5 ft 10 1/2 in)
- Position: Defensive midfielder

Team information
- Current team: Thermaikos Thermis

Youth career
- 2005: Akanthos Ierissos
- 2005–2006: Iraklis

Senior career*
Years	Team	Apps	(Gls)
2006–2011	Iraklis	100	(4)
2011–2013	Aris	33	(1)
2013–2014	Concordia Chiajna	15	(1)
2014–2016	Skoda Xanthi	45	(3)
2016–2017	Veria	4	(0)
2017	Skoda Xanthi	2	(0)
2017–2019	OFI	33	(4)
2020–2021	Triglia	17	(1)
2021–2022	Iraklis	15	(1)
2023–	Thermaikos Thermis	?	(?)

International career^{‡}
2006–2007	Greece U21	2	(0)
- * Club domestic league appearances and goals as of 20 September 2025 ‡ National team caps and goals as of 7 September 2007

Manolis Papasterianos (Greek: Μανώλης Παπαστεριανός; born 15 August 1987) is a Greek professional association football player who plays as a defensive midfielder for Gamma Ethniki club Thermaikos Thermi.

== Club career ==
Papasterianos started his career in the team of his hometown Akanthos Ierissos at a young age. His impressive performances caught the eye of Iraklis scouts and he joined their youth squad in the summer of 2005.

=== Iraklis ===
Papasterianos got promoted in Iraklis' professional squad for the 2006-2007 season. He debuted for the club in a 3–0 loss against AEK Athens, coming in as a substitute in the 63rd minute. Two minutes after his entrance in the match, he got the first yellow card in his professional career. Papasterianos also made his European debut in that season. It was in the 0–1 away win against Wisła Kraków for the first leg of the 2006–07 UEFA Cup, as he came in, as a substitute. In the second half of the season Papasterianos made 13 appearances for the club, 10 of them as a starter. In the 2008–09 season Papasterianos established himself as a starter. He made 26 appearances, 15 as a starter, and scored 2 goals. His first goal was scored in an away match against Panathinaikos, helping Iraklis to grab a 2–2 away draw. His second goal was a bicycle kick scored against Ergotelis, to help the team secure a 0–1 away win. That goal was voted as Best Goal of the 2008-2009 season, in the official competition organised by the Super League. It was as well voted as Best Goal of the 21st matchday of the 2008–09 Super League season. In the 2009–10 season he was almost an automatic first team choice, appearing in 22 of the first 23 matches of the club, 15 of them as a starter. But due to an injury in the abdominal muscles area he had to undergo surgery in Germany. As a result, he was forced to stay out for the remainder of the season. In the 2010–11 season he once again scored a goal that was voted as Best Goal of the matchday. It was a screamer from well outside the area, scored in a 2–0 victory of Iraklis against AEK for the 15th matchday. The prize was handed to him by former Iraklis striker Fanis Tountziaris.

=== Aris ===
In 2011 summer, Papasterianos joined Aris, getting the number 5. He made 9 league appearances in the first season making his debut with the club on 27 August 2011 in an away draw against PAS Giannina, but his performances weren't so good. Nevertheless, he succeeded to become an important member of the club and especially in the season 2012–13 was on the key players that helped Aris to avoid relegation. At the end of the season he didn't manage to reach an agreement with the new president of Aris and in the summer of 2013 he signed a 1-year contract with the Romanian club Concordia Chiajna.

=== CS Concordia Chiajna ===
Papasterianos' adaptation to a new environment for the first time in his career was not easy. He debuted with the club on 30 September 2013 in a lost away game against Ceahlăul Piatra Neamţ.

=== Skoda Xanthi ===
After a year in Romania, Papasterianos returned to Greek Super League playing for Skoda Xanthi. After two years with the club, he solved his contract having 57 appearances (4 goals, 2 assists) in all competitions.

=== Veria ===
On 20 August 2016, Papasterianos signed a two years' contract with Veria for an undisclosed fee.

=== Second spell in Xanthi ===
On 5 January 2017, Xanthi officially announced on Thursday the signing of experienced defensive midfielder Manolis Papasterianos, who was recently released from Veria.

=== OFI ===
On 25 August 2017, Papasterianos signed a year contract with Football League club OFI for an undisclosed fee.

== International career ==
Papasterianos has been capped twice at U21 level for Greece. He made his debut in a friendly match against Ethnikos Asteras, coming in as a substitute in the 39th minute for Sotiris Balafas. His second match was played in Neapoli Stadium against Albania U-21. Papasterianos was replaced at half-time with the score being 2–0 for Greece. The final score of the match was 3–1. During a match against Skoda Xanthi Papasterianos was watched by Zisis Vryzas, the Greek senior team's assistant manager.

== Personal life ==
Papasterianos' younger brother, Angelos, played for Iraklis as a centre-back.

== Statistics ==
=== Club ===
Club	Season	League			Cup		Continental		Other^{1}		Total	
Club	Season	Division	Apps	Goals	Apps	Goals	Apps	Goals	Apps	Goals	Apps	Goals
Iraklis	2006–07	Super League Greece	9	0	1	0	1	0	0	0	11	0
Iraklis	2007–08	Super League Greece	23	1	2	0	0	0	0	0	25	1
Iraklis	2008–09	Super League Greece	26	2	1	0	0	0	0	0	27	2
Iraklis	2009–10	Super League Greece	22	0	2	1	0	0	0	0	24	1
Iraklis	2010–11	Super League Greece	20	1	2	0	0	0	0	0	22	1
Aris	2011–12	Super League Greece	9	0	1	0	0	0	0	0	10	0
Aris	2012–13	Super League Greece	24	1	0	0	0	0	0	0	24	1
Concordia Chiajna	2013–14	Liga I	15	1	1	0	0	0	0	0	16	1
Skoda Xanthi	2014–15	Super League Greece	26	0	10	1	0	0	0	0	36	1
Skoda Xanthi	2015–16	Super League Greece	19	3	2	0	0	0	0	0	21	3
Veria	2016–17	Super League Greece	4	0	2	0	0	0	0	0	6	0
Xanthi	2016–17	Super League Greece	2	0	0	0	0	0	0	0	2	0
OFI	2017–18	Football League Greece	21	3	3	0	0	0	0	0	24	3
OFI	2018–19	Super League Greece	12	1	1	0	0	0	0	0	13	1
Career total			230	13	27	2	1	0	0	0	258	15

^{1}Includes Greek Super League playoffs.
