= Anestis Agritis =

Greek footballer (born 1981)

Personal information
- Full name: Anastasios Agritis
- Date of birth: 16 April 1981 (age 45)
- Place of birth: Mytilini, Greece
- Height: 1.76 m (5 ft 9 1/2 in)
- Position: Forward

Youth career
- 1995–1999: Doxa Plagia

Senior career*
Years	Team	Apps	(Gls)
1999–2000	Aigeas Plomari	10	(6)
2000–2007	Egaleo	167	(42)
2007–2008	Kickers Offenbach	35	(6)
2008–2009	Iraklis	20	(1)
2009–2011	OFI	65	(21)
2011–2013	Kerkyra	48	(5)
2013–2015	AEL Kalloni	6	(0)

International career
2000–2003	Greece U21	21	(2)
2004	Greece Olympic	1	(0)
2003	Greece	1	(0)
- * Club domestic league appearances and goals as of 7 April 2015

Anestis Agritis (Greek: Ανέστης Αγρίτης; born 16 April 1981) is a Greek former professional footballer who played as a forward.

He played for Aigeas Plomari, Egaleo, Kickers Offenbach in Germany's 2. Bundesliga, Iraklis, OFI, Kerkyra and AEL Kalloni.

Agritis has gained one cap for Greece. He has also played for the Greek U-21 team and was a member of the Greek Olympic football team that competed in the 2004 Summer Olympics in Athens.

== Club career ==
Agritis started his career in a young age, in 1995, at Doxa Plagia, the amateur side of his village and in 1999 he was transferred to the Delta Ethniki side Aigeas Plomari. His spell there was a brief one as during the winter transfer window of 2000 he moved to Egaleo, then in Beta Ethniki. He played at Egaleo seven years, managing to feature in 167 league matches and scoring 42 goals. In January 2007, Agritis was transferred to 2. Bundesliga outfit Kickers Offenbach. He debuted for Kickers in a 0–2 home defeat from Paderborn His first goal came in 2–1 away defeat against Aue Agritis stayed in Offenbach until the summer of 2008, featuring in 32 matches and scoring five goals. In June 2008 he signed a two-year contract with Greek Super League club Iraklis. Having played in 19 matches and scoring only 1, he was released by Iraklis after one year at the club. After his release from Iraklis he finalised the agreement he reached a few days earlier with Beta Ethniki side OFI. He scored in his debut for OFI, in a 2–1 away defeat from Diagoras for the first round of the 2009–10 season. In his first season for OFI he scored 10 out of a total of 30 league appearances. In July 2011, he moved to another Super League Greece club, Kerkyra. He played two years and managed to score fivegoals in 48 appearances. In August 2013 he was released from Kerkyra who by that time has been relegated to the Football League and signed with AEL Kalloni.

== International career ==
Afritis made his debut for Greece U21 on 6 October 2000 in a match against Finland U-21, that Greece won 3–1. He gained his only full cap for Greece on 29 January 2003, in a friendly match against Cyprus, as he replaced Nikos Lyberopoulos at half time. Agritis was a member of the Greece national under-23 football team that participated in the 2004 Summer Olympics and he played in two matches, against South Korea U-23 team and Mexico U-23 national team.
