= Kiko Ratón =

Spanish footballer (born 1976)

Personal information
- Full name: Francisco José González Expósito
- Date of birth: 19 September 1976 (age 50)
- Place of birth: Puerto de la Cruz, Spain
- Height: 1.86 m (6 ft 1 in)
- Position: Striker

Youth career
- Puerto Cruz
- Tacuense

Senior career*
Years	Team	Apps	(Gls)
1995–1997	Puerto Cruz	59	(29)
1997–2001	Tenerife B	73	(16)
1999–2000	→ Gáldar (loan)	16	(15)
2001–2002	Vecindario	30	(8)
2002–2005	Tenerife	82	(10)
2006	Hércules	11	(2)
2006–2008	Orihuela	65	(34)
2008–2009	Iraklis	15	(1)
2009–2011	Girona	73	(15)
2011–2012	Tenerife	31	(5)
2013	Eldense	9	(4)
2013–2014	Puerto Cruz		
2014–2015	Once Piratas		
2015–	Puerto Cruz	26	(20)
Total		562	(139)
- * Club domestic league appearances and goals as of 14 May 2016

Francisco José González Expósito (born 19 September 1976), commonly known as Kiko Ratón, is a Spanish footballer who plays for CD Puerto Cruz as a striker.

He amassed Segunda División totals of 166 matches and 27 goals over six seasons, representing in the competition Tenerife, Hércules and Girona.

== Club career ==
Born in Puerto de la Cruz, Province of Santa Cruz de Tenerife, Ratón finished his development at local CD Tenerife, playing his first years in the Tercera División or lower and having also appeared for the club's reserves. He made his professional debut in the 2002–03 season in the Segunda División, aged 26.

After three seasons with Tenerife, Ratón moved to second-tier side Hércules CF in January 2006, appearing rarely through one sole campaign. He resumed his career in the Segunda División B with Orihuela CF, and scored 21 goals in his second year, second overall in all four groups.

Ratón then had one assuming experience abroad, joining Iraklis F.C. of Super League Greece in summer 2008. He returned home after just one year with Girona FC, achieving, at the age of 33, his best season as a professional as the Catalans narrowly avoided relegation from the second tier.

Ratón continued to play well into his 40s, in the lower leagues and amateur football.
