= Serge Dié =

Ivorian footballer

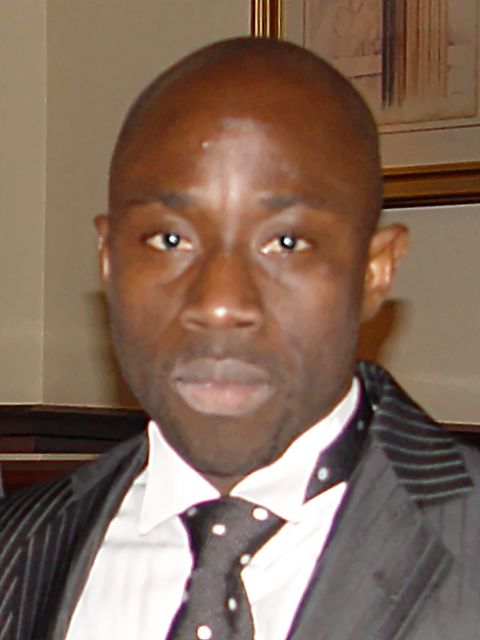

Personal information
- Full name: Mhinseia Serge Aristide Dié
- Date of birth: 4 October 1977 (age 49)
- Place of birth: Abidjan, Ivory Coast
- Height: 1.72 m (5 ft 7 1/2 in)
- Position: Defensive midfielder

Youth career
- 1996–1997: Africa Sports

Senior career*
| Years | Team | Apps | (Gls) |
| 1997–2001 | Reggina | 15 | (0) |
| 2001 | Avellino | 13 | (1) |
| 2002 | Benevento | 10 | (0) |
| 2002–2005 | OGC Nice | 45 | (2) |
| 2003 | → Avellino (loan) | 15 | (0) |
| 2004 | → FC Metz (loan) | 8 | (0) |
| 2005–2007 | Kayseri Erciyesspor | 50 | (1) |
| 2007–2008 | AC Ajaccio | 25 | (1) |
| 2008–2010 | Iraklis | 35 | (2) |
| 2010–2011 | Kavala | 36 | (4) |
| 2011–2012 | Veria | 17 | (1) |
| 2012–2013 | Kavala | 12 | (2) |
| 2013–2014 | Skoda Xanthi | 26 | (2) |
| Total | | 307 | (17) |

International career^{‡}
| 1997 | Ivory Coast U20 | 3 | (1) |
| 1995–2004 | Ivory Coast | 23 | (1) |
- * Club domestic league appearances and goals as of 16 July 2019 ‡ National team caps and goals as of 16 July 2019

Serge Dié (born 4 October 1977 in Abidjan) is a retired Ivorian former footballer who played as a midfielder.

== Career ==
He begin his playing career with Africa Sport of Abidjan, where he made his way, from the minor teams, through to the first team of the club.

== Personal ==
Dié was raised in a family of 9 children and he faced tragedy at a young age with the death of his father, André Dié.

Dié became a devout Christian in 2000, when he was a free agent for a year. He considered that his football career might be over, however during this period he agreed to offer his life to God. "I was lost and The Lord brought me back", he stated.

He married Lydia Domoraud on 22 June 2002. They have a child together, Manassé Chris-Samuel Dié, born on 17 January 2006.

Dié travelled to Ivory Coast in June 2005, in order to donate clothes and food to the war victims of the city Guitrozon, a suburb of Duékoué, a city situated on the West part of Ivory Coast.

In December 2006, Dié participated in an action of support for the inhabitants of Toulépleu, a city located centrally, organized by the First Lady of Ivory Coast, where he donated food to the people.

In December 2007, he was named "World Ambassador of Peace" by the president of the OMPP, a World Organization for Peace, for the donations quoted previously and for those that he made during his visit to the prisoners of the MACA Detention center and those of Abidjan.

In June 2008, he revisited Ivory Coast again, this time the city of Duékoué, to observe the damages caused by the crisis personally.

He created the Manassé Foundation in 2008, in order to help widows and orphans affected by the war through diverse support programs and various projects.
