= Savvas Exouzidis =

Greek footballer

Personal information
- Full name: Savvas Exouzidis
- Date of birth: 4 December 1981 (age 44)
- Place of birth: Stuttgart, West Germany
- Height: 1.93 m (6 ft 4 in)
- Position: Defender

Team information
- Current team: FC Winterthur U21 (manager)

Senior career*
Years	Team	Apps	(Gls)
2000–2002	SpVgg Ludwigsburg	13	(0)
2002–2003	Aris Limassol	11	(1)
2003–2004	Poseidon Neon Poron	3	(0)
2004–2007	Panionios	54	(2)
2007–2008	RKC Waalwijk	34	(4)
2009	Iraklis	3	(0)
2009–2010	Pierikos	34	(0)
2010–2011	Diagoras	11	(0)
2011–2014	FC Winterthur	48	(5)
2014–2015	FC Wohlen	4	(0)
2015–2016	FC United Zürich		
2017–2019	FC Frauenfeld		

Managerial career
- 2016: FC United Zürich (player-coach)
- 2017–: FC Winterthur U21
- 2017–2019: FC Frauenfeld (player-coach)
- 2019–2020: FC Sirnach
- * Club domestic league appearances and goals

Savvas Exouzidis (Greek: Σάββας Εξουζίδης; born 4 December 1981) is a Greek football manager and former footballer, who currently is the manager of FC Winterthur U21.

== Career ==
Exouzidis among various clubs, previously played for RKC Waalwijk in the Eredivisie and Panionios F.C. and Iraklis in the Super League Greece.
