= Wojciech Kowalewski =

Polish footballer and coach

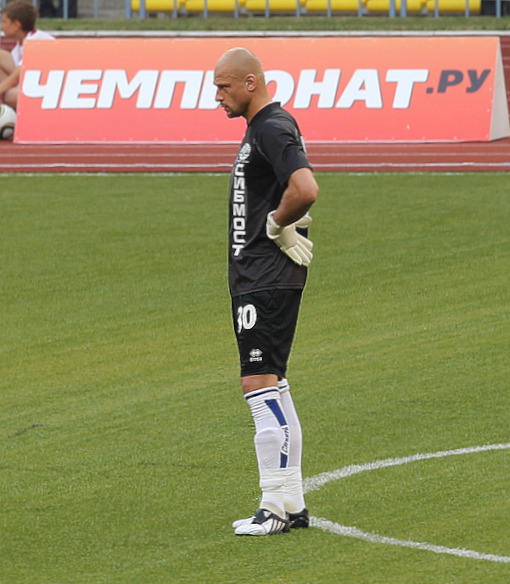

Personal information
- Date of birth: 11 May 1977 (age 49)
- Place of birth: Białystok, Poland
- Height: 1.89 m (6 ft 2 1/2 in)
- Position: Goalkeeper

Senior career*
Years	Team	Apps	(Gls)
1995–1997	Wigry Suwałki	21	(0)
1997–2000	Legia Warsaw	1	(0)
2001	Dyskobolia Grodzisk	15	(0)
2001	Legia Warsaw	16	(0)
2002–2003	Shakhtar Donetsk	19	(0)
2003	→ Spartak Moscow (loan)	10	(0)
2003–2007	Spartak Moscow	84	(0)
2007–2008	Korona Kielce	10	(0)
2008–2010	Iraklis	39	(0)
2010	Sibir Novosibirsk	14	(0)
2011	Anorthosis Famagusta	1	(0)
Total		230	(0)

International career
2002–2009	Poland	11	(0)
- * Club domestic league appearances and goals

Wojciech Kowalewski (Polish pronunciation: [ˈvɔjt͡ɕɛx kɔvaˈlɛfskʲi]; born 11 May 1977) is a Polish former professional footballer who played as a goalkeeper.

== Club career ==
Kowalewski made his top-flight debut with Wigry Suwałki during the 1996–97 season, but it was not until 2001–02, after a loan spell with second division side Dyskobolia Grodzisk, that he finally established himself with Legia. Midway through the season he moved to FC Shakhtar Donetsk and only conceded once in nine league games as Shakhtar stormed to the Ukrainian title for the first time.

After initially moving to Spartak Moscow on loan in June 2003, Kowalewski signed a five-year contract with Spartak on 7 November 2003. In late 2007, having lost his place to Stipe Pletikosa, he requested to leave the club. In December 2007 Spartak agreed to terminate his contract. He had not played for Spartak in over a year.

On 17 January 2008 it was announced that Kowalewski had started a trial period with Premier League club Reading. On 3 February 2008, Kowalewski signed a three-year deal with Polish club Korona Kielce.

Kowalewski has a reputation of being an excellent penalty-saver, once breaking FC Torpedo Moskva's Vladimir Leonchenko's streak of 13 successful spot-kicks. On 17 January 2010 Iraklis released experienced Polish goalkeeper. The player was tracked by Legia Warsaw, but joined the Russian Premier League newcomers Sibir Novosibirsk instead.

== International career ==
Kowalewski made his Poland debut in February 2002, but made only a handful of appearances before being recalled to the side at the start of Euro 2008 qualifying. He was replaced by Artur Boruc after picking up a second yellow against Portugal on 11 October 2006. Poland won that game 2–1.

Kowalewski replaced Tomasz Kuszczak in Poland's Euro 2008 squad following the Manchester United goalkeeper's back injury. He had to re-use the UEFA ID card of his team-mate Mariusz Lewandowski to enter the stadium in Klagenfurt for the match against Germany as he did not obtain an accreditation pass due to an oversight by the Polish delegation.

In September 2009, he was recalled to the squad for the World Cup qualifiers against the Czech Republic and Slovakia by coach Stefan Majewski. He was the starter against the Czechs as Poland slipped to a 2–0 defeat on 10 October 2009 which killed off any lingering hopes of qualifying for the tournament finals.

== Career statistics ==
=== International ===
Appearances, conceded goals and clean sheets by national team
National team	Year	Apps	Conceded Goals	Clean Sheets
Poland	2002	3	0	3
Poland	2004	1	0	1
Poland	2005	2	3	0
Poland	2006	3	2	1
Poland	2007	1	0	1
Poland	2009	1	2	0
Total		11	7	6

== Honours ==
Shakhtar Donetsk

- Ukrainian Premier League: 2001–02
- Ukrainian Cup: 2001–02
