= Ilias Melkas =

Albanian-born Greek footballer

Personal information
- Date of birth: 7 October 1989 (age 37)
- Place of birth: Korçë, Albania
- Height: 1.90 m (6 ft 3 in)
- Position: Goalkeeper

Team information
- Current team: Ayia Napa
- Number: 1

Youth career
- 2003–2008: Iraklis

Senior career*
Years	Team	Apps	(Gls)
2008–2011	Iraklis	1	(0)
2012–2013	Korinthos	7	(0)
2013–2014	Ethnikos Gazoros	23	(0)
2014–2015	Anagennisi Karditsa	8	(0)
2015–2017	Panserraikos	23	(0)
2017–2018	Karaiskakis Arta	25	(0)
2018–2019	Luftëtari Gjirokastër	0	(0)
2019–2020	Karaiskakis Arta	31	(0)
2020–2021	Iraklis	12	(0)
2021–2022	Ermis Aradippou	28	(0)
2022–	Ayia Napa	81	(0)
- * Club domestic league appearances and goals as of 3 May 2026

Ilias Melkas (Greek: Ηλίας Μέλκας, Albanian: Ilias Melka, born 7 October 1989) is a Greek professional footballer who plays as a goalkeeper for A.O. Ayia Napa in Cyprus.

== Career ==
Melkas debuted for Iraklis in a Greek Super League match against Skoda Xanthi on 26 April 2009.

== Personal life ==
Melkas was born in Albania. His father Jovan Melka was an international volleyball player.
