= Achilleas Sarakatsanos =

Greek footballer

Personal information
- Full name: Achilleas Sarakatsanos
- Date of birth: 3 November 1982 (age 43)
- Place of birth: Trikala, Greece
- Height: 1.81 m (5 ft 11 1/2 in)
- Position: Centre back

Senior career*
Years	Team	Apps	(Gls)
2000–2001	Karditsa	27	(0)
2001–2005	Apollon Smyrnis	72	(8)
2005–2008	Panathinaikos	0	(0)
2005–2006	→ Kerkyra (loan)	27	(0)
2006–2008	→ Apollon Kalamarias (loan)	41	(0)
2008–2010	Iraklis	29	(1)
2011	Trikala	18	(1)
2011–2014	Panthrakikos	54	(1)
2014–2015	AEL	31	(1)
2015–2016	Agrotikos Asteras	12	(0)
2016–2017	Trikala	29	(0)
- * Club domestic league appearances and goals as of 17:42, 14 June 2017 (UTC)

Achilleas Sarakatsanos (Greek: Αχιλλέας Σαρακατσάνος; born 3 November 1982 in Trikala) is a Greek football defender. He had previously played for Apollon Smyrnis, Kerkyra, Apollon Kalamarias, Iraklis, Trikala and AEL. He was also under contract in Panathinaikos but he did not make any appearances for the club.

== Career ==
Sarakatsanos started his career from A.O. Karditsa before being transferred to Apollon Smyrnis. His good performances there gained him a transfer to Greek giants Panathinaikos, that loaned him firstly to Kerkyra and subsequently to Apollon Kalamarias, before selling him to Iraklis for a €30,000 fee. On 29 December 2010, Sarakatsanos was released from Iraklis. A few days later, he signed at Trikala, the club of his hometown. From 2011, to 2014 he played for Panthrakikos. Since the summer of 2014 to 2015, he played for the Thessalian club AEL.
