= Georgios Ioannidis (footballer) =

Greek footballer (born in 1988)

Personal information
- Full name: Georgios Ioannidis
- Date of birth: 4 May 1988 (age 38)
- Place of birth: Serres, Greece
- Height: 1.73 m (5 ft 8 in)
- Position: Left-back

Team information
- Current team: AE Lefkimmi

Senior career*
Years	Team	Apps	(Gls)
2006–2010	Iraklis	43	(0)
2010–2012	Panathinaikos	15	(0)
2012–2013	OFI	22	(2)
2013–2014	Levadiakos	10	(0)
2015–2018	Panserraikos	66	(2)
2019–	AE Lefkimmi	0	(0)

International career
2007–2008	Greece U19	7	(0)
2008–2010	Greece U21	12	(1)
Medal record
Greece under-19
Silver medal – second place	UEFA European Under-19 Championship	2007
- * Club domestic league appearances and goals as of 12:28, 10 June 2018 (UTC)

Georgios Ioannidis (Greek: Γεώργιος Ιωαννίδης; born 4 May 1988) is a Greek footballer who plays as a left-back for AE Lefkimmi.

== Club career ==
Ioannidis is a product of the youth academies of Iraklis and started his professional career at the first team in 2006. In his four years at the club, he made 43 league appearances.

On 22 July 2010, Ioannidis moved to Panathinaikos on a free transfer, signing a three-year contract. At Panathinaikos, he met his former Greece under-19 head coach Nikos Nioplias, who was the head coach of Tryfilli at the time.

On the final days of July 2012, Ioannidis said at an interview that many teams have shown interest for him, and that the interest of AEK Athens is an honour for him. He also said that he wants to go at a club that he would play regularly.

On 21 January 2019, AE Lefkimmi announced the signing of Ioannidis.

== International career ==
Ioannidis was a member of the Greek under-19 team who reached the final of the 2007 European under-19 championship against Spain, a game which they lost 1–0.

He was also a member of Greece under-21, as he made 12 appearances and scored one goal for the team against Macedonia under-21.

== Club statistics ==
As of 13 April 2012

Club performance			League		Cup		Total	
Season	Club	League	Apps	Goals	Apps	Goals	Apps	Goals
Greece			League		Greek Cup		Total	
2006–07	Iraklis	Super League Greece	9	0	–		9	0
2007–08	Iraklis	Super League Greece	12	0	–		12	0
2008–09	Iraklis	Super League Greece	17	0	–		17	0
2009–10	Iraklis	Super League Greece	5	0	1	0	6	0
2010–11	Panathinaikos	Super League Greece	11	0	1	0	12	0
2011–12	Panathinaikos	Super League Greece	4	0	1	0	5	0
Career total			58	0	3	0	61	0
