= Charalampos Perperidis =

Greek footballer

Babis Perperidis
Personal information
- Full name: Charalampos Perperidis
- Date of birth: 29 April 1986 (age 40)
- Place of birth: Drama, Greece
- Height: 1.78 m (5 ft 10 in)
- Position: Center midfielder

Team information
- Current team: Doxa Drama

Youth career
- 1998–2002: Aris Kalamona
- 2002–2004: Pandramaikos

Senior career*
Years	Team	Apps	(Gls)
2004–2010	Iraklis	32	(14)
2010–2011	Panthrakikos	28	(7)
2011–2012	Panserraikos	12	(9)
2012–	Doxa Drama	26	(12)

International career^{‡}
	Greece U-17	15	(1)
	Greece U-19	15	(2)
- * Club domestic league appearances and goals as of 17 January 2013 ‡ National team caps and goals as of 17 January 2013

Charalampos "Babis" Perperidis (Greek: Χαράλαμπος "Μπάμπης" Περπερίδης, born 29 April 1986) is a Greek footballer who plays for Gamma Ethniki club Pandramaikos.

== Club career ==
Began his career as professional footballer in Iraklis in 2004. Until 2010 he competed in Super League with Iraklis. In August 2010, Perperidis signed a contract with Panthrakikos F.C. In July 2011, he signed a contract with Panserraikos F.C.

== International career ==
Perperidis has represented Greece at U-17 and U-19 level.

=== Career statistics ===
season	club	league	Championship		Nation cup		Europe cup		Total	
season	club	league	appear	goals	appear	goals	appear	goals	appear	goals
2004–05	Iraklis F.C.	Super League	4	0	0	0	0	0	4	0
2005–06	Iraklis F.C.	Super League	9	0	0	0	0	0	9	0
2006–07	Iraklis F.C.	Super League	0	0	0	0	0	0	0	0
2007–08	Iraklis F.C.	Super League	3	0	0	0	0	0	3	0
2008–09	Iraklis F.C.	Super League	10	0	1	0	0	0	11	0
2009–10	Iraklis F.C.	Super League	6	0	0	0	0	0	6	0
2010–11	Panthrakikos	Beta Ethniki	28	1						
2011–12	Panserraikos	Beta Ethniki	12	0						
career total			72	1	1	0	0	0	73	1

Date of last update: 22 July 2011
