= Denis Epstein =

German footballer

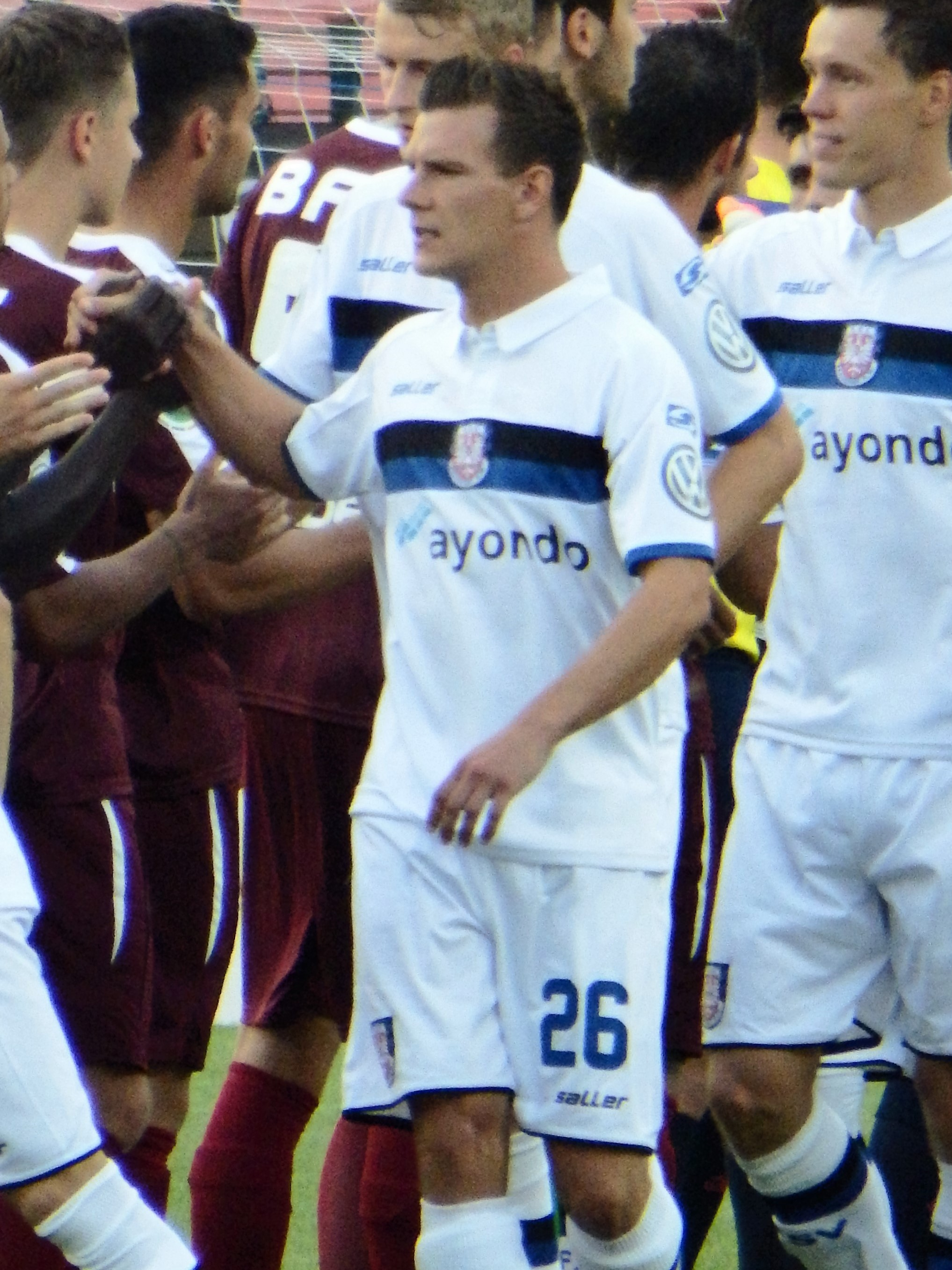
- Epstein with FSV Frankfurt in 2015

Personal information
- Date of birth: 2 July 1986 (age 40)
- Place of birth: Cologne, West Germany
- Height: 1.80 m (5 ft 11 in)
- Position: Left winger

Youth career
- Bayer Leverkusen
- 1. FC Köln

Senior career*
Years	Team	Apps	(Gls)
2005–2007	1. FC Köln	23	(2)
2007	→ Rot-Weiss Essen (loan)	5	(1)
2007–2008	Kickers Offenbach	21	(0)
2008–2010	Iraklis	50	(8)
2010–2011	Olympiacos	0	(0)
2010–2011	→ Kerkyra (loan)	27	(9)
2011–2013	Atromitos	56	(2)
2013–2016	FSV Frankfurt	63	(6)
2016–2018	Kerkyra	51	(10)
2018–2019	Lamia	24	(2)
2019–2020	TSG Balingen	18	(2)
Total		338	(42)

International career
2006	Germany U20	4	(1)

Managerial career
- 2020–2024: TSG Balingen II
- 2023: TSG Balingen (caretaker)
- * Club domestic league appearances and goals

Denis Epstein (born 2 July 1986) is a German former professional footballer who played as a left winger.

== Career ==
=== Youth clubs ===
Epstein played for three youth clubs, ranging from 1995 to 2005, including the youth teams of Bayer Leverkusen, Fortuna Köln, and 1. FC Köln. In the 1998–99 season, he made a rivalry switch from Bayer Leverkusen to 1. FC Köln. He was picked up as a senior team member for 1. FC Köln II in 2005, playing 31 games for the third division reserve team and scoring three goals.

=== 1. FC Köln ===
Epstein made his senior debut for 1. FC Köln in the Bundesliga in a 4–1 loss against Hannover 96. He scored his first Bundesliga goal against VfL Wolfsburg after he being substituted on for Dimitrios Grammozis. He ended a seven-game losing streak for the relegation-threatened club. After that, he rarely started a match for Köln, scoring only one goal in the 2006–07 season.

=== Rot-Weiss Essen ===
Epstein was loaned out to Rot-Weiss Essen on 20 January 2007 until the end of the 2. Bundesliga season by Köln coach Christoph Daum, to gain more match experience.

=== Greece ===
On 24 June 2008, Epstein signed a contract with Iraklis. He appeared in 24 matches for Iraklis during the 2008–09 season. After another equally successful season (with four goals in 26 appearances), his contract was terminated by mutual consent on 18 June 2010.

In summer 2011, Epstein became the first of Ernesto Valverde's 'unwanted list' at Olympiacos to leave the club, after a year-long loan to Kerkyra. On 18 July 2011, Epstein signed a three-year contract with Atromitos for an undisclosed fee. For the Athenian club, he made 64 appearances scoring 4 goals across all competitions. On 9 April 2013, he terminated his contract with the club.

=== FSV Frankfurt ===
In summer 2013, Epstein returned to Germany signing a three-year contract with FSV Frankfurt, returning to the 2. Bundesliga.

=== Return to Greece ===
In June 2016, Epstein returned to former PAE Kerkyra having agreed a two-year contract.

On 6 June 2018, after having been released by Kerkyra, he signed a contract with Lamia until the summer of 2020. On 24 September 2018, he scored his first goal for the club in a 2–2 away draw against Panetolikos. On 12 October 2018, he opened the score in an eventual 2–1 away loss against AEK Athens for the Greek Cup. On 20 October 2018, he scored against AEL, completing his team's comeback and helping to a 2–1 away win.

== Coaching career ==
In the summer of 2020, after hanging up his boots, it was confirmed that Epstein would continue at TSG Balingen, albeit in a different role; he would be the player-coach of the club's U23/reserve team. During his time at the club as a coach, Epstein also served as responsible for parts of the club's youth sector.

On November 20, 2023, it was confirmed that Epstein had been appointed interim head coach of the club's first team until the end of the year. In April 2024 it was confirmed that Epstein would leave the club after the season.

== Career statistics ==
=== Club ===
As of 6 May 2019

Appearances and goals by club, season and competition
Club	Season	League		Cup		Continental		Others		Total	
Club	Season	Apps	Goals	Apps	Goals	Apps	Goals	Apps	Goals	Apps	Goals
1. FC Köln	2005–06	11	2	0	0	–		–		11	2
1. FC Köln	2006–07	12	0	2	0	–		–		14	0
1. FC Köln	Total	23	2	2	0	0	0	0	0	25	2
Rot-Weiss Essen (loan)	2006–07	5	1	0	0	–		–		5	1
Kickers Offenbach	2007–08	21	0	2	0	–		–		23	0
Iraklis	2008–09	24	5	2	0	–		–		26	5
Iraklis	2009–10	26	4	1	0	–		–		27	4
Iraklis	Total	50	9	3	0	0	0	0	0	53	9
Kerkyra (loan)	2010–11	27	9	4	0	–		–		31	9
Atromitos	2011–12	33	2	4	0	–		–		37	2
Atromitos	2012–13	23	0	2	1	2	1	–		27	2
Atromitos	Total	56	2	6	1	2	1	0	0	64	4
FSV Frankfurt	2013–14	32	6	2	0	–		–		34	6
FSV Frankfurt	2014–15	9	0	1	0	–		–		10	0
FSV Frankfurt	2015–16	22	0	1	0	–		–		23	0
FSV Frankfurt	Total	63	6	4	0	0	0	0	0	67	6
Kerkyra	2016–17	26	4	2	1	–		–		28	5
Kerkyra	2017–18	25	6	0	0	–		–		25	6
Kerkyra	Total	51	10	2	1	0	0	0	0	53	11
Lamia	2018–19	24	2	6	1	–		–		30	3
Career total		320	41	29	3	2	1	0	0	351	45
