= Konstantinos Foufoulas =

Greek footballer

Personal information
- Full name: Konstantinos Foufoulas
- Date of birth: 25 October 1984 (age 42)
- Place of birth: Patras, Greece
- Height: 1.83 m (6 ft 0 in)
- Positions: Centre back; defensive midfielder

Team information
- Current team: Ilioupoli
- Number: 36

Youth career
- 1998–2002: Aris Patras

Senior career*
Years	Team	Apps	(Gls)
2002–2003	Aris Patras		
2003–2004	Patraikos	28	(1)
2004–2006	Panachaiki	42	(2)
2006–2008	Kerkyra	47	(1)
2008–2010	Iraklis	13	(0)
2010	Olympiacos Volos		
2010–	Ilioupoli		
2011–2012	Panachaiki	8	(1)

International career
- Greece U19
- Greece U21
- * Club domestic league appearances and goals as of 1 November 2009

Konstantinos Foufoulas (Greek: Κωνσταντίνος Φούφουλας; born 25 October 1984) is a Greek footballer. He plays either as a centre back or as a defensive midfielder with equal success.
