= Panagiotis Kone =

Greek footballer (born 1987)

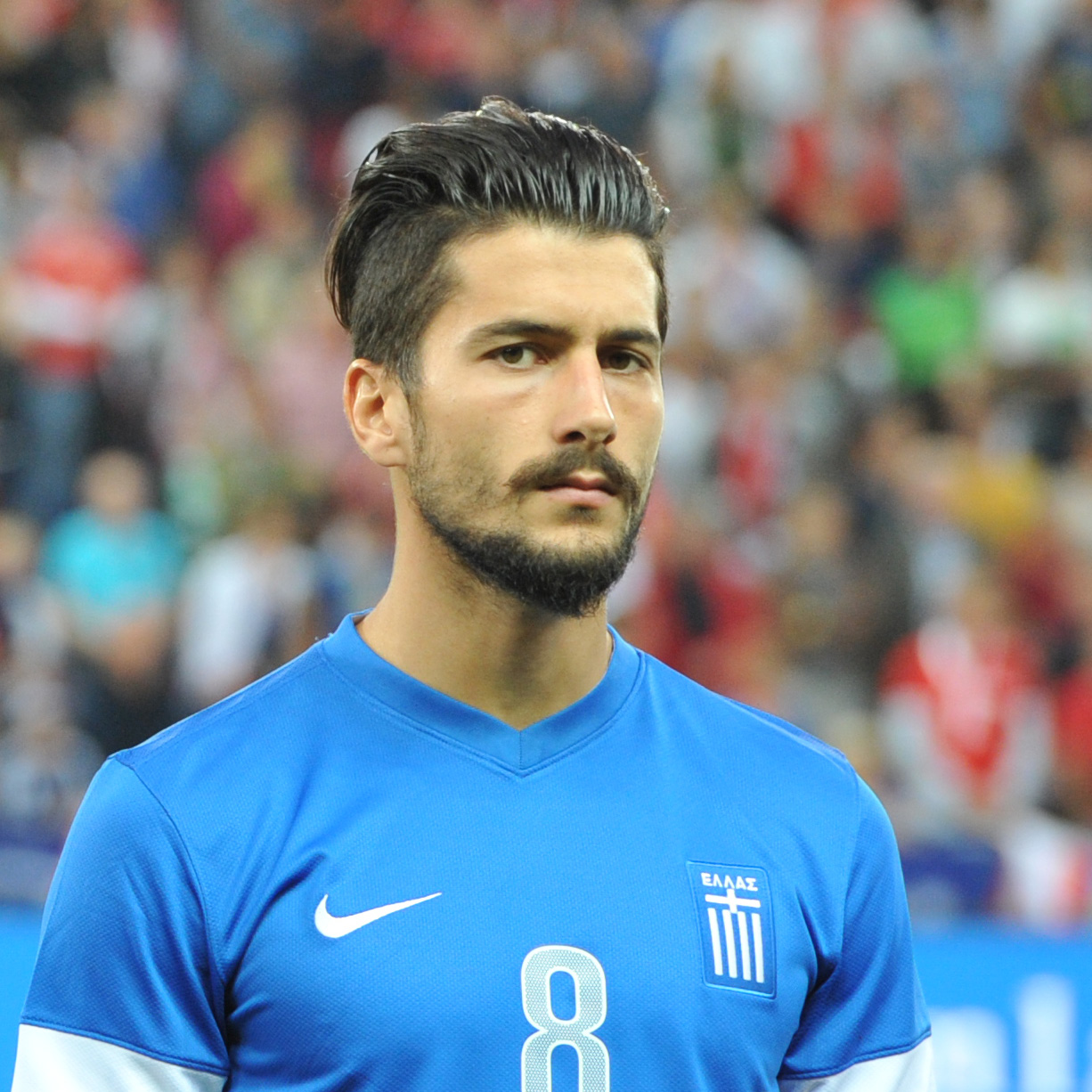
- Kone with Greece in 2013

Personal information
- Birth name: Gjergji Kone
- Date of birth: 26 July 1987 (age 39)
- Place of birth: Tirana, Albania
- Height: 1.82 m (6 ft 0 in)
- Position: Midfielder

Youth career
- 1999–2004: Olympiacos
- 2004–2005: Lens

Senior career*
Years	Team	Apps	(Gls)
2005–2008	AEK Athens	24	(2)
2008–2010	Iraklis	49	(8)
2010–2012	Brescia	31	(1)
2011–2012	→ Bologna (loan)	31	(1)
2012–2014	Bologna	59	(11)
2014–2018	Udinese	38	(1)
2016	→ Fiorentina (loan)	1	(0)
2017	→ Granada (loan)	2	(0)
2017–2018	→ AEK Athens (loan)	13	(1)
2019–2020	Western United	15	(2)
Total		263	(27)

International career^{‡}
2006	Greece U19	4	(1)
2006–2007	Greece U21	8	(0)
2010–2015	Greece	28	(2)

Managerial career
- 2020–2022: AEK Athens (Technical Director)
- 2022–2024: AEK Athens (Executive Director)
- * Club domestic league appearances and goals as of 03:29, 23 February 2020 (UTC). ‡ National team caps and goals as of 24 October 2015

Panagiotis Kone (Greek: Παναγιώτης Κονέ, born 26 July 1987) is a Greek former professional footballer who played as a midfielder.

Kone started playing football in the youth ranks of Olympiacos, from where he moved to Lens' youth team. He started professional football in AEK Athens before moving to Iraklis in 2008. After two seasons with the club, Kone moved to Serie A club Brescia. After one season in Brescia, he moved to Bologna in 2011 on loan, then transferred permanently to the club in 2012.

He then signed for Udinese in 2014. After loan spells with Fiorentina, Granada and AEK Athens, Kone left Udinese in August 2018.

Kone represented Greece at various youth levels before making his senior debut in 2010. He was a member of the Greece squad that played in the 2014 World Cup.

== Early life ==
He was born as Gjergji Kone in Tirana, Albania, and migrated to Greece with his parents Isaac, a biologist, and Leontina, a piano teacher, and older brother to Athens when he was two years old. He changed his name to Panagiotis as part of the naturalisation process. He has said, regarding his identity and ethnicity, that he is a Greek. Some of his relatives still live in Albania and whenever he visits the country, he presents himself as “Kone the Albanian” in order to prevent discrimination. His brother, Sotiris, owns a bar in Athens.

According to Albanian and Italian press he is of Albanian origin, while he has stated that his family is ethnically Greek despite coming from Albania.

Kone began his youth career at the Olympiacos youth academy as a young teenager, but moved to France just before his 17th birthday when Lens showed interest in him. He was sold to Lens for €400,000.

== Club career ==
=== AEK Athens ===
On 29 July 2005, Kone returned to Greece to join AEK Athens, signing his first professional contract. However, since he played for the youth team of Olympiacos, the latter claimed the player in order not to sign with AEK, based on a law regarding amateur footballers who play abroad. On 21 December, after six months of litigation, AEK were vindicated and the HFF validated the player's sports card. In his first two seasons, he wore the number 10 shirt, but with the arrival of former Ballon d'Or winner Rivaldo to the club, he changed it to 22.

=== Iraklis ===
On 29 August 2008, after his contract with AEK was terminated, Kone moved to Iraklis. In his two seasons with the club, he made 49 league appearances and scored eight goals; in 37 of these matches, he either played as a substitute or he was substituted. Although in times he showed football brilliance, the facts that he was rather unstable and the lack of teamwork could not secure him a firm place in Iraklis' starting eleven.

=== Contract dispute with Iraklis ===
In July 2010, Kone trained with Italian side Brescia despite still being under contract with Iraklis. After this became known to Brescia, Kone no longer trained with the club. He requested and expected to have his contract with Iraklis terminated due to supposed debt by the club to him, but on 22 July 2010, the Hellenic Football Federation (HFF) decided against the request. Nonetheless, Iraklis sold him to Brescia for a €800,000 transfer fee.

=== Brescia ===
In July 2010, Kone made an attempt to play for a club outside the Greek borders, signing with Brescia Calcio ahead of the 2010–11 Serie B season. He put in some impressive performances, catching the eye of club management with his technical training, fast pace and strong sense of goal. Following Brescia's relegation after finishing 19th in 2010–11, however, he signed with Bologna on loan for the 2011–12 season, with an option to make the loan permanent.

=== Bologna ===
Kone initially arrived at Bologna on a temporary basis as a replacement for the recently departed Francesco Della Rocca, who had moved to Palermo.

In June 2013, Bologna officially reached a deal to buy-out Brescia's 50 percent ownership of Kone for a €1.6 million fee. At the time, he was co-owned by the two clubs. Prior to the deal, negotiations between the two had been troubled and there were fears the matter would go to a blind auction over the summer of 2013. Shortly after the deal, Kone extended his contract with Bologna until June 2017. The Greek attacking midfielder has made his name in Italy with some truly spectacular goals, notably a scissor-kick volley against Napoli last season at the Stadio San Paolo which gave his side all three points in a 2–3 away victory.

On 24 November 2013, Kone scored his first goal of the 2013–14 season in a 1–1 home draw against Internazionale, finding the net in the 12th minute. In the penultimate matchday on 11 May 2014, Bologna, after a 1–2 home loss to Catania, were relegated to Serie B. After the defeat, 300 Bologna fans surrounded the squad and prevented them from reaching manager Davide Ballardini, instead screaming for contracts to be torn up over a cordon of riot police. Captain Kone—as one of a few players to emerge from the season with any value at all—was consoled by a supporter after breaking down in tears in the melee. "The dressing room is destroyed, we are mortified. Kone has been crying alone on the pitch," coach Ballardini was quoted as saying in La Gazzetta dello Sport.

Following the demotion, reports in Italy suggested that Palermo were keen to sign Kone, hoping to close the deal before the 2014 FIFA World Cup. Despite Bologna asking €5.6 million for Kone, Palermo offered around €3 million, but were also exploring the idea of a loan move with the option to buy-out the next year. The possibility of including players as compensation was also explored. Additionally, according to Tuttosport, Torino management were ready to make their decisive move for Kone due to Giampiero Ventura's will.

=== Udinese ===
Despite Palermo and Torino's interest, Udinese confirmed the signing of Kone. No details were provided concerning the transfer fee or any contract details.

On 22 January 2015, Kone scored the equalizing goal—a fierce, low volley—in the 2014–15 Coppa Italia against reigning champions Napoli in extra time. After the 2–2 draw, however, ten-man Udinese were eliminated in the subsequent penalty shoot-out. During extra time, Kone also threatened to score the winner when pouncing on a Miguel Britos error, forcing goalkeeper Mariano Andújar into a save at full stretch. On 22 March, Kone scored his first Serie A goal with Udinese, coming against Fiorentina. After the match, he said to Udinese Channel, "My goal was important for the team, certainly did not deserve to lose this game because, beyond the first 10 minutes of the second half, we played a great game. We are a group full of young kids, I make compliments to the coach as he read the game and for the changes it made because it allowed us to play better in a difficult moment. Against Torino and Fiorentina I think we played very well and our team is growing every day. Do not forget that this is only the first year of this project."

On 23 August 2015, in the opening match of the 2015–16 Serie A season, Kone, as a substitute, helped Udinese stop Juventus' 47-game unbeaten streak at home in the league by providing an assist to teammate Cyril Théréau in an eventual 0–1 away win. On 13 October 2015, Udinese confirmed that Kone suffered a calf injury while on international duty with Greece and would be out of action for 2 1/2 months. On 17 December 2015, Kone made his return to the team, scoring an impressive goal against Lazio in the 2015–16 Coppa Italia; controlling a cross with his heel, he swung his leg around and acrobatically flicked the ball into the top-left hand corner of the goal. Despite the individual effort, however, Lazio prevailed 2–1, knocking Udinese out of the tournament. On 24 January 2016, Kone almost 4 months since his last appearance with the club in Serie A, played again as a substitute for Emmanuel Agyemang-Badu in a 4–1 away loss against Palermo.

He started the 2016-17 season, filled with last year's injuries including a painful experience to Fiorentina. Kone has returned to Udinese without having played a competitive match and a trust to be rebuilt. Slowly proved to coach Giuseppe Iachini that he reached on a good physical level and has given greater awareness in their own ability. Physically, the form is still to find, as well as the race pace. However the fans appreciated his entrance against Empoli in the tactical aspect, as he helped the club stopping being anxious and hasty in control of the race and the team seemed more compact. On 12 October 2016, Udinese has announced that kone has suffered from dislocated shoulder, without be certain for the day of his return.

==== ACF Fiorentina ====
On 31 January 2016, Kone joined Fiorentina on a loan with the right of redemption from Udinese. The deal is for an initial loan, but Udinese confirmed on their official website that Fiorentina will have the option to buy. Former Bologna midfielder Kone has struggled with injury problems this season, making only five league appearances for Udinese as a result. On 4 February 2016, Kone poked surprising from Fiorentina's UEFA Europa League squad, a surprise for the midfielder as has been dropped from Paulo Sousa, coach of the club. Panagiotis Kone made his Fiorentina debut in the Serie A match away to Empoli as an 82nd-minute substitute for Josip Ilicic on 10 April 2016.

==== Granada ====
On 19 January 2017, Kone was loaned to La liga club Granada, for six months.

==== Return to AEK ====
On 30 August 2017, Kone returned to AEK Athens on a season-long loan with a buy-out option. On 23 November 2017, almost 8 months after his last appearance, Kone came as a substitute in a home 2–2 UEFA Europa League group stage home game against Rijeka. On 11 December 2017 Kone scored his first goal for the club after 10 years in a 3–1 home win against Kerkyra. Kone made 20 performances in all competitions with the champions of Greece during the 2017–2018 season.

After his loan, Kone has returned to Udinese, but the administration of AEK was expecting his release from the Italian club in order to sign him. On 31 August 2018, he mutually solved his contract with Udinese, but eventually AEK did not proceed in his signing.

=== Western United ===
On 31 January 2019, Kone became the first signing for new A-League side Western United FC ahead of their inaugural season in a 2-year marquee deal.

== International career ==
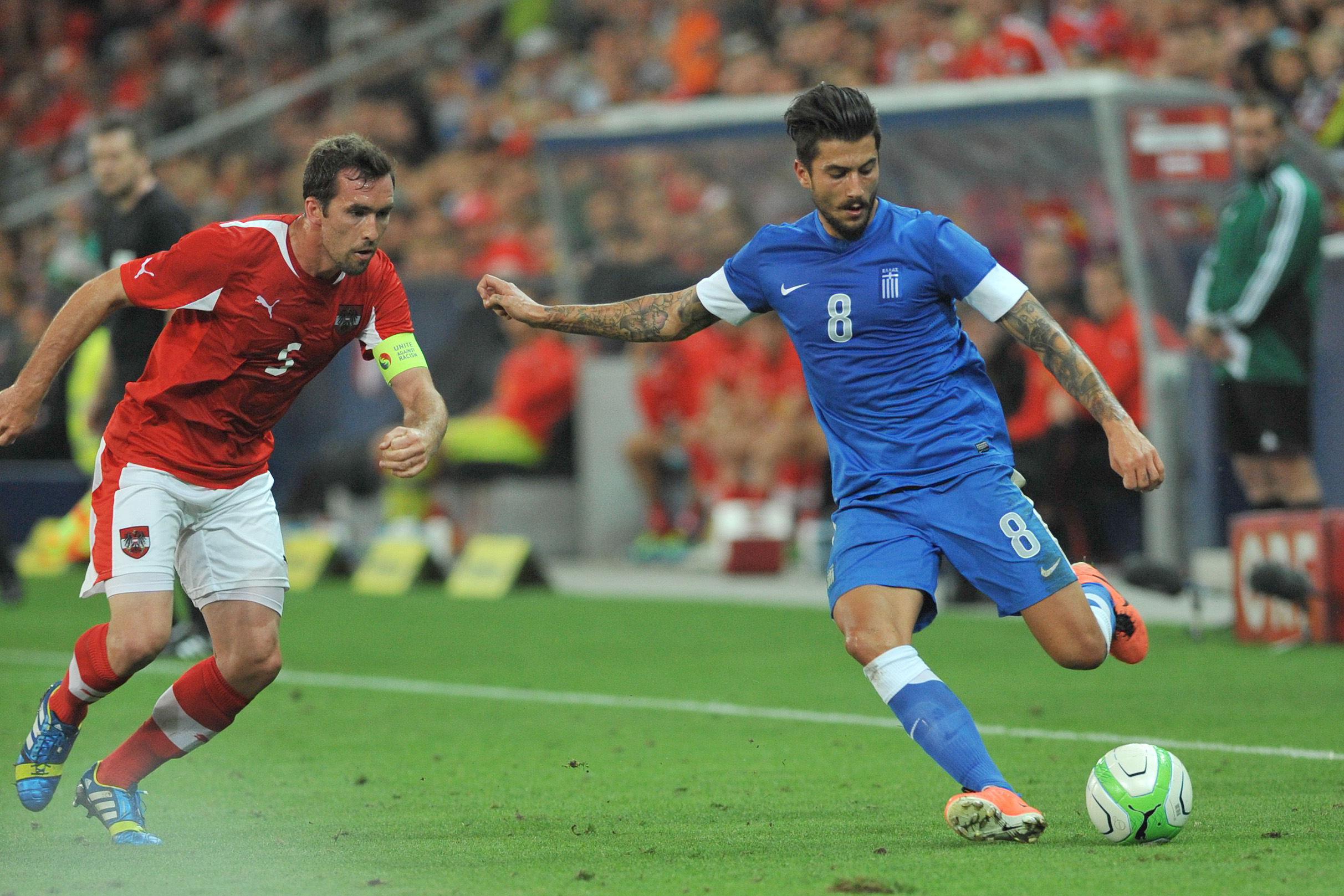
Kone in action against Austria's Christian Fuchs in an August 2013 friendly

Kone has represented Greece at the youth level. Shortly after signing for Brescia, new Greece coach Fernando Santos called him up for UEFA Euro 2012 qualifying matches against Georgia and Croatia. On 17 November 2010, Kone debuted for the senior national team in a 1–2 friendly away win over Austria. He played the entire first half before being replaced.

Kone was named in the provisional squad for UEFA Euro 2012. On 26 May 2012, he was sent-off during Greece's 1–1 draw with Slovenia in a pre-tournament friendly. "What happened with Kone is a shame. Sometimes in the heat of the match we lose our minds," Santos explained after the draw. Kone was eventually excluded from Greece's final 23-man squad.

Two years later, Kone's exceptional season year with Bologna helped convince Santos to include the player in both the 30-man provisional World Cup squad and final 23-man squad for the 2014 World Cup. On 7 June 2014, he scored his first goal with the Greece in a 2–1 friendly victory against Bolivia.

On 15 June 2015, Kone, as a Greek player, sparked controversy after a photograph surfaced showed him just one day after Greece's humiliating 1–2 defeat to the Faroe Islands making an Albanian gesture, putting him under scrutiny.

On 11 October 2015, Kone scored in a dramatic 4–3 win over Hungary for UEFA Euro 2016 qualifying, meeting a José Holebas cross to net a powerful header. It was the first and only win for Greece in qualifying, where it finished last in Group F, meaning it will miss out on the final tournament.

== Career statistics ==
=== International ===
Appearances and goals by national team and year
National team	Year	Apps	Goals
Greece	2010	1	0
Greece	2011	8	0
Greece	2012	1	0
Greece	2013	4	0
Greece	2014	8	1
Greece	2015	6	1
Total		28	2

Scores and results list Greece's goal tally first, score column indicates score after each Kone goal.

List of international goals scored by Panagiotis Kone
No.	Date	Venue	Opponent	Score	Result	Competition
1	6 June 2014	Red Bull Arena, Harrison, United States	Bolivia	1–0	2–1	Friendly
2	11 October 2015	Karaiskakis Stadium, Piraeus, Greece	Hungary	4–3	4–3	UEFA Euro 2016 qualification

== Honours ==
AEK Athens

- Super League Greece: 2017–18
