= Kydon Karlopoulos =

Greek footballer (born in 1989)

Personal information
- Full name: Kydon Karlopoulos
- Date of birth: 3 May 1989 (age 37)
- Place of birth: Athens, Greece
- Height: 1.68 m (5 ft 6 in)
- Position: Midfielder

Team information
- Current team: Makedonikos

Youth career
- Foinikas Polichni
- Atermon
- Vasiloudi
- –2008: Iraklis

Senior career*
Years	Team	Apps	(Gls)
2008–2009	Iraklis	3	(0)
2009–2010	Olympicos Volos	11	(0)
2010–2011	Doxa Drama	2	(0)
2011–2012	Thrasyvoulos	18	(0)
2012–2013	Anagennisi Giannitsa	19	(0)
2013–2014	Kavala	17	(2)
2014–2016	Vyzantio		
2016–2017	Doxa Drama		
2017–2018	Aris Palaiochori		
2018–	Makedonikos		
- * Club domestic league appearances and goals as of 22 August 2017

Kydon Karlopoulos (Greek: Κύδων Καρλόπουλος, born 3 May 1989) is a Greek footballer who plays for Makedonikos. Karlopoulos started his professional career for Iraklis and has also played for Olympiacos Volos and Kavala.

== Club career ==
Karlopoulos started his professional career for Super League Greece side Iraklis. He debuted for Iraklis as an injury time substitute, in a 5–0 away defeat of Iraklis. After being released from Iraklis, Karlopoulos signed a three-year contract on 31 August 2009 for Olympiacos Volos], then a Beta Ethniki side. His first match for Olympiacos Volos was a 1–3 home defeat from Kerkyra, for the opening round of the 2009-10 season. Until the end of the season Karlopoulos appeared in 11 matches. In the summer of 2010 Karlopoulos moved to Doxa Drama. He debuted for Doxa, as they won 2–0 against Kallithea. He only appeared in one more game for Doxa Drama, before signing for Ethnikos Piraeus on 31 January 2011. His debut for Ethnikos was made a week later, in an 0–1 away win against Anagennissi Karditsa and it was marked by Karlopoulos' sending off.

== Honours ==
Olympiacos Volos

- Beta Ethniki: 2009–10
