= Grigoris Papazacharias =

Greek footballer (born 1985)

Personal information
- Full name: Grigoriοs Papazacharias
- Date of birth: 20 March 1985 (age 41)
- Place of birth: Epanomi, Greece
- Height: 1.86 m (6 ft 1 in)
- Positions: Centre back; right back

Youth career
- 1997–1999: Anagennisi Epanomi
- 1999–2002: Iraklis

Senior career*
Years	Team	Apps	(Gls)
2002–2010	Iraklis	116	(3)
2010–2013	Aris	41	(0)
2013–2014	Apollon Smyrnis	15	(0)
2014–2015	Enosis Neon Paralimniou	22	(0)
2016–2017	Doxa Drama	0	(0)
2017–2018	Apollon Larissa	29	(2)
2018–2019	Egaleo		
2019–2020	Thyella Kamari		
2020–2021	Santorini		
2021–2024	Anagennisi Epanomi		
- * Club domestic league appearances and goals as of 25 August 2024

Grigoris Papazacharias (Greek: Γρηγόρης Παπαζαχαρίας; born 20 March 1985) is a Greek former footballer. He has represented Greece at all youth levels.

== Career ==
Papazacharias began his career in Anagennisi Epanomi. He joined Iraklis in 1999. He stayed in Iraklis for 11 years, until 2010. He has over 118 performances with blue-white jersey and scored 6 league goals. In 2003-2004-2005 years, Iraklis was in very good form, finishing 4th behind Olympiacos, Panathinaikos and AEK Athens, with Papazaharias being in first eleven in center-back duo, with Tasos Katsabis. He was appointed as the captain for Iraklis in 2007. In 2010 Papazacharias transferred to local rivals Aris, but an injury left him out for about 4 months. During his first season at Aris, he played in only 3 matches.

On 30 June 2019, Thyella Kamari F.C. announced that they had signed Papazaharias.
