= Dimitrios Giantsis =

Greek footballer

Personal information
- Full name: Dimitrios Giantsis
- Date of birth: 4 March 1988 (age 38)
- Place of birth: Griva, Kilkis, Greece
- Height: 1.72 m (5 ft 7 1/2 in)
- Position: Right winger

Youth career
- 1998–2003: Makedonikos Grivas
- 2003–2006: Iraklis

Senior career*
Years	Team	Apps	(Gls)
2006–2010	Iraklis	56	(8)
2010–2013	Kerkyra	56	(2)
2013–2015	Levadiakos	13	(1)
2015	AEL	17	(2)
2015–2016	Agrotikos Asteras	15	(0)
2016	Panserraikos	13	(2)
2016–2017	Akropolis IF	6	(0)

International career
2008–2010	Greece U21	10	(0)
- * Club domestic league appearances and goals as of 30 March 2018

Dimitrios Giantsis (Greek: Δημήτριος Γιάντσης; born 4 March 1988) is a Greek former professional footballer.

== Club career ==
=== Iraklis ===
Giantsis started his career in the academies of the football team of his hometown. In 2003, he was spotted by Iraklis' scouters and he joined the football academy of Iraklis. On 1 July 2006, Giantsis signed a professional contract with Iraklis. He was released by the club in the summer of 2010.

=== AO Kerkyra ===
In the summer transfer window Giantsis signed on a free transfer for AO Kerkyra in the Super League Greece. He debuted for his new club in a 2–1 winning match against AEK Athens for the 1st matchday of the 2010–2011 season of the Super League Greece.

=== Akropolis IF ===
In the summer of 2016, Giantsis signed for third-tier Swedish club Akropolis IF.

== International career ==
Giantsis made 10 appearances for the Greek U-21 team. He debuted in 1–1 draw against the Albanian U-21 team in Ruzhdi Bizhuta Stadium, Elbasan on 20 August 2008.
