= 2010–11 Panionios F.C. season =

Panionios
2010–11 season
- Chairman: Gerasimos Ventouris
- Manager: Takis Lemonis
- Stadium: Nea Smyrni Stadium
- Super League Greece: 10th
- Greek Cup: Fourth round
- Top goalscorer: League: Kostas Mitroglou (8); All: Kostas Mitroglou (8)

The 2010–11 season was Panionios' 50th season in Super League Greece. They also competed in the Greek Football Cup.

== Current squad ==
Note: Flags indicate national team as defined under FIFA eligibility rules; some limited exceptions apply. Players may hold more than one non-FIFA nationality.

No.	Pos.	Nation	Player
1	GK	SVK	Tomáš Belic
2	DF	GEO	Dato Kvirkvelia
4	DF	SWE	Markus Jonsson
5	DF	CZE	Martin Latka
6	DF	NGR	Suleiman Omo
7	MF	DEN	Kasper Risgård
8	FW	ESP	Sito Riera
10	FW	CRO	Boško Balaban
11	FW	GRE	Kostas Mitroglou (on loan from Olympiacos)
12	DF	FRA	Cédric Varrault
13	DF	BEL	Georgios Galitsios (on loan from Olympiacos)
14	MF	CRO	Davor Kukec
15	MF	URU	Fabian Estoyanoff
16	FW	GRE	Dimitris Kolovos

No.	Pos.	Nation	Player
19	GK	GER	Markus Pröll
20	MF	GRE	Fanouris Goundoulakis (captain)
21	MF	GHA	Bennard Kumordzi
22	MF	GRE	Andreas Samaris
23	DF	GRE	Dimitrios Siovas
24	MF	GRE	Dimitrios Anastasopoulos
25	DF	GRE	Giannis Kontoes
26	DF	BIH	Edin Cocalić
27	MF	KSA	Amiri Kurdi
28	FW	ALG	Mohamed Chalali
39	FW	POR	Ricardo Vaz Tê
41	MF	FRA	Maxime Partouche
77	GK	AUT	Jürgen Macho
87	GK	GRE	Leonidas Panagopoulos
99	FW	CZE	Václav Svěrkoš (on loan from Sochaux)

== Transfers ==
=== In ===
Time	Pos.	Name	From	Fee
Summer	DF	(South Africa) Patrick Phungwayo	(South Africa) Bidvest Wits	Loan
Summer	MF	(Albania) Jahmir Hyka	(Germany) Mainz	€105.600
Summer	MF	(France) Maxime Partouche	(France) Paris Saint-Germain	Free
Summer	FW	(Algeria) Mohamed Chalali	(France) Châteauroux	Free
Summer	MF	(Denmark) Kasper Risgård	(Germany) Arminia Bielefeld	Free
Summer	DF	(Nigeria) Solomon Okpako	(Nigeria) Kano Pillars	Free
Summer	GK	(Austria) Jürgen Macho	(Austria) LASK Linz	Free
Summer	DF	(France) Cédric Varrault	(France) Saint-Étienne	Free
Summer	FW	(Portugal) Ricardo Vaz Tê	(England) Bolton	Free
Summer	MF	(Liberia) Isaac Pupo	(Azerbaijan) Mughan	Free
Summer	MF	(Greece) Dimitrios Kiliaras	(Greece) Ergotelis	Return From Loan
Summer	DF	(Greece) Andreas Iraklis	(Greece) Kallithea	Return From Loan
Summer	DF	(Finland) Mehmet Hetemaj	(Italy) AlbinoLeffe	Return From Loan
Winter	FW	(Greece) Konstantinos Mitroglou	(Greece) Olympiacos	Loan
Winter	DF	(Greece) Georgios Galitsios	(Greece) Olympiacos	Loan
Winter	FW	(Czech Republic) Václav Svěrkoš	(France) Sochaux	Loan
Winter	DF	(Georgia (country)) Dato Kvirkvelia	(Russia) Rubin Kazan	Free
Winter	GK	(Germany) Markus Pröll	–	–

=== Out ===
Time	Pos.	Name	To	Fee
Summer	DF	(Greece) Georgios Tzavelas	(Germany) Eintracht Frankfurt	€1.056.000
Summer	FW	(France) Bédi Buval	(Poland) Lechia Gdańsk	Free
Summer	DF	(Finland) Mehmet Hetemaj	(Italy) AlbinoLeffe	€105.600
Summer	GK	(Greece) Charalambos Tabasis	(Greece) Diagoras	Free
Summer	GK	(Greece) Kostas Andriolas	(Greece) Panthrakikos	Free
Summer	MF	(Cyprus) Marios Nicolaou	(Cyprus) AEL Limassol	Free
Summer	MF	(Greece) Manolis Skoufalis	(Greece) PAS Giannina	Free
Summer	DF	(Greece) Theodoros Santamouris	(Greece) Agia Paraskevi	Free
Summer	FW	(Australia) Giannis Simosis	(Greece) Panthrakikos	Free
Summer	DF	(Greece) Nikolaos Lazouras	(Greece) Keravnos Keratea	Free
Summer	MF	(Greece) Christos Maniatis	(Greece) Keravnos Keratea	Free
Summer	DF	(Greece) Andreas Iraklis	(Greece) Kallithea	Free
Summer	MF	(Uruguay) Fabián Estoyanoff	(Uruguay) Peñarol	Loan
Summer	FW	(Greece) Giannis Loukinas	(Greece) AEL Kalloni	Loan
Summer	MF	(Argentina) Carlos Casteglione	(Argentina) Arsenal Sarandí	End of Loan
Summer	DF	(Brazil) Wellington Baroni	(Spain) Espanyol	End of Loan
Summer	GK	(Spain) Isaac Becerra	(Spain) Espanyol B	End of Loan
Winter	DF	(Greece) Ioannis Maniatis	(Greece) Olympiacos	
Winter	MF	(Albania) Jahmir Hyka	(Albania) KF Tirana	€61.600
Winter	GK	(Slovakia) Tomáš Belic	(Slovakia) FK Púchov	Free
Winter	MF	(Greece) Dimitrios Kiliaras	(Greece) Levadiakos	Free
Winter	DF	(South Africa) Patrick Phungwayo	(South Africa) Bidvest Wits	End of Loan
Winter	FW	(Portugal) Ricardo Vaz Tê	(Scotland) Hibernian	Free
Winter	FW	(Albania) Vasil Shkurti	(Greece) Thrasyvoulos	Loan
Winter	FW	(Greece) Giannis Loukinas	(Greece) PAO Rouf	Loan
Winter	MF	(Greece) Christos Kontochristos	(Greece) Nafpaktiakos Asteras	Loan
Winter	DF	(Nigeria) Solomon Okpako	(South Africa) Mamelodi Sundowns	Free
Winter	MF	(Liberia) Isaac Pupo	(Sweden) Hammarby	Free

== Matches ==
=== Super League ===
28 August 2010 Round 1	Panionios	0–1	Olympiacos Volos	Nea Smyrni
17:15		summary	Breška 59'	Stadium: Nea Smyrni Stadium; Attendance: 2,494; Referee: Ilias Spathas

12 September 2010 Round 2	Skoda Xanthi	1–1	Panionios	Xanthi
15:00	Marcelinho 51' (pen.)	summary	Riera 10'	Stadium: Skoda Xanthi Arena; Attendance: 2,138; Referee: M.Lambropoulos

19 September 2010 Round 3	Panionios	1–0	Aris	Nea Smyrni
17:15	Balaban 86'	summary		Stadium: Nea Smyrni Stadium; Attendance: 3,315; Referee: S.Tritsonis

25 September 2010 Round 4	Panathinaikos	2–1	Panionios	Athens
19:30	Ninis 44'; Katsouranis 62'	summary	Kumordzi 90+2'	Stadium: Olympic Stadium (Athens); Attendance: 33,112; Referee: C.Mitsios

2 October 2010 Round 5	Kavala	2–1	Panionios	Kavala
19:30	Onwuachi 45'; Vučićević 49'	summary	Vaz Tê 52'	Stadium: Anthi Karagianni Stadium; Attendance: 1,044; Referee: P.Zachariadis

16 October 2010 Round 6	Panionios	0–1	Ergotelis	Nea Smyrni
17:15		summary	Leal 40'	Stadium: Nea Smyrni Stadium; Attendance: 2,548; Referee: A.Pappas

24 October 2010 Round 7	PAOK	3–1	Panionios	Thessaloniki
17:15	Muslimović 8'; Salpingidis 11'; Fotakis 35'	summary	Maniatis 77'	Stadium: Toumba Stadium; Attendance: Without spectators Referee: A.Giachos

31 October 2010 Round 8	Panionios	1–0	AEK Athens	Nea Smyrni
19:30	Riera 50'	summary		Stadium: Nea Smyrni Stadium; Attendance: 3,044; Referee: M.Tsiniaris

6 November 2010 Round 9	Olympiacos	5–0	Panionios	Piraeus
19:30	Mirallas 34', 68'; Torosidis 51'; Pantelić 78'; Riera 90+3'	summary		Stadium: Karaiskakis Stadium; Attendance: 22,312; Referee: P.Konstantineas

13 November 2010 Round 10	Panionios	0–1	Atromitos	Nea Smyrni
15:00		summary	Tatos 35'	Stadium: Nea Smyrni Stadium; Attendance: 2,350; Referee: A.Sidiropoulos

21 November 2010 Round 11	AEL	0–1	Panionios	Larissa
17:15		summary	Samaris 42'	Stadium: Alcazar Stadium; Attendance: 6,160; Referee: S.Mantalos

28 November 2010 Round 12	Panionios	1–0	Iraklis	Nea Smyrni
15:00	Kukec 69'	summary		Stadium: Nea Smyrni Stadium; Attendance: 2,644; Referee: P.Konstantineas

4 December 2010 Round 13	Panionios	0–1	Kerkyra	Nea Smyrni
17:15		summary	Flavinho 17'	Stadium: Nea Smyrni Stadium; Attendance: 2,172; Referee: N.Charalabidis

12 December 2010 Round 14	Panserraikos	1–1	Panionios	Serres
15:00	Leozinho 21' (pen.)	summary	Siovas 65'	Stadium: Serres Municipal Stadium; Attendance: 1,377; Referee: M.Tsiniaris

18 December 2010 Round 15	Panionios	0–0	Asteras Tripolis	Nea Smyrni
17:15		summary		Stadium: Nea Smyrni Stadium; Attendance: 1,926; Referee: P.Konstantineas

5 January 2011 Round 16	Olympiacos Volos	0–0	Panionios	Volos
17:15		summary		Stadium: Panthessaliko Stadium; Attendance: 4,678; Referee: M.Koukoulakis

9 January 2011 Round 17	Panionios	0–2	Skoda Xanthi	Nea Smyrni
15:00		summary	Katongo 10'; Boateng 26'	Stadium: Nea Smyrni Stadium; Attendance: 2,106; Referee: A.Kakos

16 January 2011 Round 18	Aris	0–2	Panionios	Thessaloniki
17:15		summary	Mitroglou 19', 90+1'	Stadium: Kleanthis Vikelidis Stadium; Attendance: 8,205; Referee: S.Mantalos

23 January 2011 Round 19	Panionios	1–1	Panathinaikos	Nea Smyrni
19:30	Mitroglou 49'	summary	Cissé 55' (pen.)	Stadium: Nea Smyrni Stadium; Attendance: 3,908; Referee: A. Kakos

30 January 2011 Round 20	Panionios	1–1	Kavala	Nea Smyrni
15:00	Balaban 66'	summary	Dié 90'	Stadium: Nea Smyrni Stadium; Attendance: 2,315; Referee: A.Aretopoulos

6 February 2011 Round 21	Ergotelis	2–0	Panionios	Heraklion
15:00	Shashiashvili 5'; Júnior 47'	summary		Stadium: Pankritio Stadium; Attendance: 1,210; Referee: I.Spathas

12 February 2011 Round 22	Panionios	1–0	PAOK	Nea Smyrni
17:15	Balaban 72' (pen.)	summary		Stadium: Nea Smyrni Stadium; Attendance: 3,114; Referee: G.Stathopoulos

20 February 2011 Round 23	AEK Athens	1–1	Panionios	Athens
19:30	Liberopoulos 45+1'	summary	Mitroglou 89'	Stadium: Olympic Stadium (Athens); Referee: S. Mantalos

27 February 2011 Round 24	Panionios	1–1	Olympiacos	Nea Smyrni
19:30	Svěrkoš 68'	summary	Mirallas 43'	Stadium: Nea Smyrni Stadium; Attendance: 3,388; Referee: V.Pamporidis

6 March 2011 Round 25	Atromitos	1–2	Panionios	Peristeri
17:15	Sfakianakis 52'	summary	Goundoulakis 63'; Mitroglou 67'	Stadium: Peristeri Stadium; Attendance: 2,740; Referee: I.Spathas

13 March 2011 Round 26	Panionios	3–3	AEL	Nea Smyrni
15:00	Galitsios 21'; Mitroglou 32' (pen.); Balaban 76'	summary	Siovas 61' (o.g.); Metin 83' (pen.); Dabizas 85'	Stadium: Nea Smyrni Stadium; Attendance: 3,508; Referee: A.Pappas

20 March 2011 Round 27	Iraklis	1–1	Panionios	Thessaloniki
19:00	Ngwat-Mahop 90+4'	summary	Mitroglou 39'	Stadium: Kaftanzoglio Stadium; Attendance: 1,055; Referee: A. Sidiropoulos

3 April 2011 Round 28	Kerkyra	1–2	Panionios	Kerkyra
19:00	Epstein 64' (pen.)	summary	Mitroglou 30'; Siovas 79'	Stadium: Kerkyra Stadium; Attendance: 1,301; Referee: S.Tritsonis

10 April 2011 Round 29	Panionios	0–0	Panserraikos	Nea Smyrni
19:00		summary		Stadium: Nea Smyrni Stadium; Attendance: 2,661; Referee: A.Giachos

17 April 2011 Round 30	Asteras Tripolis	3–1	Panionios	Tripoli
19:00	Pulido 7', 42'; Ladakis 44'	summary	Galitsios 87'	Stadium: Asteras Tripolis Stadium; Attendance: 436; Referee: A.Giachos

=== Greek Cup ===
27 October 2010 Fourth Round	Diagoras	3–1	Panionios	Rodos
17:00	Tarachulski 30'; Salamastrakis 82'; Jose Reyes 90+5'	summary	Riera 9'	Stadium: Diagoras Stadium; Referee: I. Delfakis

== Top goalscorers ==
8 goals

- (Greece) Kostas Mitroglou (8 in Super League)

4 goals

- (Croatia) Boško Balaban (4 in Super League)

3 goals

- (Spain) Sito Riera (2 in Super League, 1 in Greek Cup)

2 goals

- (Greece) Dimitris Siovas (2 in Super League)
- (Greece) Georgios Galitsios (2 in Super League)

1 goal

- (Ghana) Bennard Kumordzi (1 in Super League)
- (Portugal) Ricardo Vaz Tê (1 in Super League)
- (Greece) Giannis Maniatis (1 in Super League)
- (Greece) Andreas Samaris (1 in Super League)
- (Croatia) Davor Kukec (1 in Super League)
- (Czech Republic) Václav Svěrkoš (1 in Super League)
- (Greece) Fanouris Goundoulakis (1 in Super League)
