= 2009–10 Panionios F.C. season =

Panionios
2009–10 season
- Chairman: Konstantinos Tsakiris
- Manager: Georgios Paraschos
- Stadium: Nea Smyrni Stadium
- Super League Greece: 9th
- Greek Cup: Quarter-finals
- Top goalscorer: League: Boško Balaban (9); All: Boško Balaban (9)

The 2009–10 season was Panionios' 49th season in Super League Greece.

On summer Boško Balaban from Dinamo Zagreb, Sito Riera from Espanyol and other players transferred to Panionios. The team finished in the 9th place in Super League Greece.

== Current squad ==
Note: Flags indicate national team as defined under FIFA eligibility rules; some limited exceptions apply. Players may hold more than one non-FIFA nationality.

No.	Pos.	Nation	Player
1	GK	SVK	Tomáš Belic
2	DF	GRE	Giannis Maniatis (captain)
3	DF	BRA	Wellington Baroni
4	DF	SWE	Markus Jonsson
5	DF	CZE	Martin Latka
6	DF	NGR	Suleiman Omo
7	MF	GRE	Manolis Skoufalis
8	FW	ESP	Sito Riera
9	FW	CRO	Boško Balaban
10	MF	URU	Alvaro Recoba
11	MF	URU	Fabián Estoyanoff
12	GK	GRE	Kostas Andriolas
13	MF	ARG	Carlos Casteglione
14	MF	GHA	Bennard Kumordzi
17	FW	AUS	Giannis Simosis
18	MF	CRO	Davor Kukec

No.	Pos.	Nation	Player
19	FW	GRE	Giannis Loukinas
20	MF	GRE	Fanouris Goundoulakis
21	FW	FRA	Bédi Buval
22	MF	GRE	Andreas Samaris
23	DF	GRE	Dimitris Siovas
24	MF	GRE	Dimitrios Anastasopoulos
25	DF	GRE	Giannis Kontoes
26	DF	BIH	Edin Cocalić
27	DF	KSA	Amiri Kurdi
28	MF	CYP	Marios Nicolaou
29	DF	GRE	Christos Kontochristos
30	GK	ESP	Isaac Becerra
31	DF	GRE	Georgios Tzavelas
32	DF	GRE	Christos Maniatis
39	FW	GRE	Dimitris Kolovos

== Transfers ==
=== In ===
Period	Pos.	Name	From	Fee
Summer	DF	(Saudi Arabia) Amiri Kurdi	(Greece) Panionios U20	-
Summer	MF	(Greece) Christos Kontochristos	(Greece) Panionios U20	-
Summer	FW	(Greece) Giannis Simosis	(Greece) Panionios U20	-
Summer	DF	(Greece) Nikolaos Lazouras	(Greece) Panionios U20	-
Summer	FW	(Croatia) Boško Balaban	(Croatia) Dinamo Zagreb	Free
Summer	GK	(Spain) Isaac Becerra	(Spain) Espanyol B	Loan
Summer	DF	(Brazil) Wellington Baroni	(Spain) Espanyol	Loan
Summer	MF	(Argentina) Carlos Casteglione	(Argentina) Arsenal Sarandí	Loan - €114.400
Summer	FW	(Spain) Sito Riera	(Spain) Espanyol B	€132.000
Summer	DF	(Nigeria) Suleiman Omo	(Greece) Ilisiakos	€88.000
Summer	FW	(Greece) Giannis Loukinas	(Greece) Agia Paraskevi	€61.600
Summer	DF	(Croatia) Dario Smoje	(Belgium) Gent	Free
Winter	FW	(France) Bédi Buval	(Greece) Panthrakikos	€132.000
Winter	DF	(Bosnia and Herzegovina) Edin Cocalić	(Bosnia and Herzegovina) Željezničar	€66.000
Winter	MF	(Greece) Andreas Samaris	(Greece) Panachaiki	€52.800
Winter	DF	(Sweden) Markus Jonsson	(Sweden) AIK	Free
Winter	MF	(Greece) Dimitris Kolovos	(Greece) PAS Oropos	Free

=== Out ===
Period	Pos.	Name	To	Fee
Summer	GK	(Croatia) Dario Krešić	(Greece) PAOK	Free
Summer	DF	(Mali) Sékou Berthé	-	-
Summer	DF	(Mali) Fousseni Diawara	-	-
Summer	FW	(Brazil) Alexandre D'Acol	-	-
Summer	FW	(Greece) Christos Aravidis	(Greece) Aris	Free
Summer	FW	(Greece) Dimitris Sialmas	(Greece) PAS Giannina	Free
Summer	FW	(Greece) Giorgos Barkoglou	(Greece) Levadiakos	Free
Summer	FW	(Brazil) Anderson Gonzaga	(Bolivia) Bolívar	Free
Summer	DF	(Germany) Matthias Langkamp	(Germany) Karlsruher SC	Free
Summer	FW	(Portugal) Luís Lourenço	(Greece) Kerkyra	Free
Summer	DF	(Croatia) Ivica Majstorović	(Greece) PAS Giannina	Free
Summer	FW	(Germany) Michael Delura	(Germany) Arminia Bielefeld	Free
Summer	DF	(Greece) Vangelis Koutsopoulos	(Greece) Atromitos	Free
Summer	MF	(Greece) Grigoris Makos	(Greece) AEK Athens	€756.000
Summer	MF	(Greece) Thanasis Palaskas	(Greece) Egaleo	Free
Summer	DF	(Greece) Stamatis Barakos	(Greece) Tyrnavos	Free
Summer	DF	(Greece) Lazaros Bourelakos	-	-
Summer	GK	(Greece) Charalambos Tabasis	(Greece) Egaleo	On loan
Summer	MF	(Greece) Dimitrios Kiliaras	(Greece) Ergotelis	On loan
Summer	MF	(Greece) Christos Maniatis	(Greece) Egaleo	On loan
Summer	DF	(Greece) Andreas Iraklis	(Greece) Kallithea	On loan
Summer	DF	(Finland) Mehmet Hetemaj	(Italy) AlbinoLeffe	On loan
Summer	FW	(Ivory Coast) Yann Ekra	(England) Hull City	Loan Ends
Winter	FW	(Uruguay) Álvaro Recoba	(Uruguay) Danubio	Free
Winter	DF	(Croatia) Dario Smoje	-	-
Winter	DF	(Greece) Spiros Gitsalis	(Greece) Olympiakos Lavrio	Free
Winter	DF	(Albania) Giannis Kontis	(Greece) Rodos	Free

== Matches ==
=== Super League ===
23 September 2009 1	Panionios	0 – 0	PAOK	Nea Smyrni
19:15		Summary		Stadium: Nea Smyrni Stadium; Attendance: 2,003; Referee: Dimitrios Kirkos

29 August 2009 2	Panionios	1 – 1	Ergotelis	Nea Smyrni
17:00	Kumordzi 24'	Summary	Romano 35'	Stadium: Nea Smyrni Stadium; Attendance: 3,032; Referee: Apostolos Amparkiolis

13 September 2009 3	Levadiakos	1 – 0	Panionios	Levadia
19:15	Barkoglou 70'	Summary		Stadium: Levadia Municipal Stadium; Attendance: 1,918; Referee: Athanasios Giachos

19 September 2009 4	Panionios	1 – 3	Asteras Tripolis	Nea Smyrni
17:45	Omo 68'	Summary	Cesarec 5'; Éder 38', 42'	Stadium: Nea Smyrni Stadium; Attendance: 2,928; Referee: Ilias Spathas

26 September 2009 5	Olympiacos	1 – 0	Panionios	Piraeus
17:45	Zairi 17'	Summary		Stadium: Karaiskakis Stadium; Attendance: 22,163; Referee: Vasilios Pamporidis

5 October 2009 6	Panionios	2 – 1	Atromitos	Nea Smyrni
17:45	Skoufalis 20'; Omo 90'	Summary	Perrone 76' (pen.)	Stadium: Nea Smyrni Stadium; Attendance: 3,205; Referee: Michail Koukoulakis

18 October 2009 7	Iraklis	0 - 2	Panionios	Thessaloniki
19:00		Summary	Balaban 47'; Maniatis 57'	Stadium: Kaftanzoglio Stadium; Attendance: 4,061; Referee: Marios Lambropoulos

24 October 2009 8	Panionios	3 - 1	PAS Giannina	Nea Smyrni
19:00	Goundoulakis 17'; Balaban 22'; Casteglione 72'	Summary	Patrick Dimbala 15'	Stadium: Nea Smyrni Stadium; Attendance: 5,144; Referee: Michail Voskakis

1 November 2009 9	Panathinaikos	2 - 1	Panionios	Marousi
19:00	Djibril Cissé 9' (pen.), 11'	Summary	Riera 53'	Stadium: Olympic Stadium (Athens); Attendance: 18,066; Referee: Konstantinos Papastamatis

8 November 2009 10	Skoda Xanthi	1 - 2	Panionios	Xanthi
15:30	Zieńczuk 55'	Summary	Balaban 18', 85'	Stadium: Skoda Xanthi Arena; Attendance: 1,158; Referee: Apostolos Amparkiolis

22 November 2009 11	Panionios	3 - 1	Panthrakikos	Nea Smyrni
17:45	Estoyanoff 2' (pe.); Omo 84'; Riera 90'	Summary	Robert 60'	Stadium: Nea Smyrni Stadium; Attendance: 3,459; Referee: Michail Voskakis

29 November 2009 12	Aris	1 - 1	Panionios	Thessaloniki
17:45	Neto 82'	Summary	Kumordzi 94'	Stadium: Kleanthis Vikelidis Stadium; Attendance: 12,562; Referee: Petros Konstantineas

6 December 2009 13	Panionios	3 - 1	AEK Athens	Nea Smyrni
19:00	Maniatis 21'; Riera 80'; Balaban 89'	Summary	Leonardo 28'	Stadium: Nea Smyrni Stadium; Attendance: 4,568; Referee: Ilias Spathas

13 December 2009 14	AEL	2 - 2	Panionios	Larissa
14:30	Goundoulakis 51', 59'	Summary	Metin 65' (pen.), 90+1'	Stadium: Alcazar Stadium; Attendance: 2,462; Referee: Georgios Daloukas

20 December 2009 15	Panionios	1 - 2	Kavala	Nea Smyrni
14:30	Balaban 59' (pen.)	Summary	Rincón 86' (pen.); Onwuachi 90+2'	Stadium: Nea Smyrni Stadium; Attendance: 3,770; Referee: Anastasios Sidiropoulos

6 January 2010 16	PAOK	1 – 0	Panionios	Thessaloniki
19:15	Vladimir Ivić 31'	Summary		Stadium: Toumba Stadium; Attendance: 16,129; Referee: Georgios Daloukas

9 January 2010 17	Ergotelis	0 – 0	Panionios	Heraklion
17:00		Summary		Stadium: Pankritio Stadium; Attendance: 1,363; Referee: Michail Ntakos

17 January 2010 18	Panionios	2 – 2	Levadiakos	Nea Smyrni
17:15	Balaban 87'; Latka 90'	Summary	Napoleoni 57'; Barkoglou 74'	Stadium: Nea Smyrni Stadium; Attendance: 2,869; Referee: Anastasios Sidiropoulos

23 January 2010 19	Asteras Tripolis	2 – 0	Panionios	Tripoli
16:45	Wilchez 10', 36'	Summary		Stadium: Theodoros Kolokotronis Stadium; Attendance: 1,155; Referee: Nathanail Charalampidis

31 January 2010 20	Panionios	0 – 1	Olympiacos	Nea Smyrni
16:45		Summary	Derbyshire 7'	Stadium: Nea Smyrni Stadium; Attendance: 4,852; Referee: Dimitrios Kirkos

7 February 2010 21	Atromitos	1 - 0	Panionios	Peristeri
16:45	Brito 55'	Summary		Stadium: Peristeri Stadium; Attendance: 1,830; Referee: Apostolos Amparkiolis

14 February 2010 22	Panionios	0 - 0	Iraklis	Nea Smyrni
15:30		Summary		Stadium: Nea Smyrni Stadium; Attendance: 1,056; Referee: Anastasios Sidiropoulos

21 February 2010 23	PAS Giannina	2 - 3	Panionios	Ioannina
15:30	Mendrinos 30'; Saitiotis 44' (pen.)	Summary	Cocalić 7'; Riera 18'; Maniatis 85'	Stadium: Zosimades Stadium; Attendance: 4,398; Referee: Georgios Stathopoulos

28 February 2010 24	Panionios	0 - 2	Panathinaikos	Nea Smyrni
21:15		Summary	Djibril Cisse 21' (pen.), 55'	Stadium: Nea Smyrni Stadium; Attendance: 5,607; Referee: Dimitrios Kalopoulos

7 March 2010 25	Panionios	3 - 0	Skoda Xanthi	Nea Smyrni
15:30	Kumordzi 21'; Latka 39'; Balaban 61'	Summary		Stadium: Nea Smyrni Stadium; Attendance: 1,892; Referee: Dimitrios Kalopoulos

14 March 2010 26	Panthrakikos	0 - 1	Panionios	Komotini
15:30	Latka 67'	Summary		Stadium: Komotini Municipal Stadium; Attendance: 2,810; Referee: Georgios Giannopoulos

21 March 2010 27	Panionios	1 - 1	Aris	Nea Smyrni
19:00	Kukec 80'	Summary	Johnson 11'	Stadium: Nea Smyrni Stadium; Attendance: 2,708; Referee: Marios Lampropoulos

28 March 2010 28	AEK Athebs	1 - 1	Panionios	Marousi
19:00	Scocco 90+3'	Summary	Goundoulakis 40'	Stadium: Olympic Stadium; Attendance: 14,098; Referee: Dimitrios Kirkos

11 April 2010 29	Panionios	0 - 3	AEL	Nea Smyrni
19:00		Summary	Metin 27'; Toama 39'; Cousin 60'	Stadium: Nea Smyrni Stadium; Attendance: 2,533; Referee: Michail Koukoulakis

18 April 2010 30	Kavala	1 - 1	Panionios	Kavala
19:00	Rincón 7'	Summary	Goundoulakis 13'	Stadium: Anthi Karagianni Stadium; Attendance: 1,245; Referee: Stavros Tritsonis

=== Greek Cup ===
==== Matches ====
27 October 2009 Fourth Round	Panetolikos	0 - 0 (7 - 8 p)	Panionios	Agrinio
15:15		Summary		Stadium: Panetolikos Stadium; Attendance: 6,000; Referee: Andreas Pappas
	Penalties
	Stojanović (penalty scored); Mumin (penalty scored); Vuković (penalty scored); Dentsas (penalty missed); Zouroudis (penalty scored); Mörec (penalty scored); Baykara (penalty scored); Belevonis (penalty scored); Anastasiadis (penalty missed)		Casteglione (penalty scored); Maniatis (penalty scored); Estoyanoff (penalty scored); Kumordzi (penalty missed); Riera (penalty scored); Anastasopoulos (penalty scored); Skoufalis (penalty scored); Tzavellas (penalty scored); Omo (penalty scored)

20 January 2010 Fifth Round	Thrasyvoulos	0 - 1	Panionios	Fyli
17:00		Summary	Balaban 91'	Stadium: Fyli Stadium

==== Quarter-Finals ====
10 February 2010 First leg	Kavala	0 - 0	Panionios	Kavala
17:00		Summary		Stadium: Anthi Karagianni Stadium; Referee: Michail Ntakos

17 February 2010 Second leg	Panionios	1 - 2 (a.e.t.)	Kavala	Nea Smyrni
17:00	Riera 47'	Summary	Dobrašinović 84'; Benjamin Onwuachi 95'	Stadium: Nea Smyrni Stadium; Referee: Vasilis Pamboridis

== Top goalscorers ==
9 goals

- (Croatia) Boško Balaban (8 in Super League, 1 in Greek Cup)

5 goals

- (Greece) Fanouris Goundoulakis (5 in Super League)
- (Spain) Sito Riera (4 in Super League, 1 in Greek Cup)

3 goals

- (Czech Republic) Martin Latka (3 in Super League)
- (Ghana) Bennard Yao Kumordzi (3 in Super League)
- (Nigeria) Suleiman Omo (3 in Super League)

1 goal

- (Greece) Manolis Skoufalis (1 in Super League)
- (Argentina) Carlos Casteglione (1 in Super League)
- (Uruguay) Fabián Estoyanoff (1 in Super League)
- (Croatia) Davor Kukec (1 in Super League)
