= 2008–09 Panionios F.C. season =

Panionios
2008–09 season
- Chairman: Konstantinos Tsakiris
- Manager: Joti Stamatopoulos
- Stadium: Nea Smyrni Stadium, Athens
- Super League Greece: 8th
- Greek Cup: Quarterfinals
- Intertoto Cup: Third Round

The 2008–09 season is Panionios is 118th season in existence and its 48th in the top tier of the modern Greek football league system. They will also compete in the Greek Cup and UEFA Intertoto Cup. This year Álvaro Recoba the star of Uruguay who was in Inter Milan for years transferred to Panionios on September. He came to Athens with his compatriot Fabián Estoyanoff who also signs his contract with Panionios.

== Current squad ==
No.	Name	Nationality	Position (s)	Date of birth (age)	Signed rom	Notes
Goalkeepers
1	Dario Krešić	(Croatia)	Goalkeeper	11 January 1984 (25)	(Germany) SV Eintracht Trier 05	
12	Kostas Andriolas	(Greece)	Goalkeeper	1 May 1985 (24)	(Greece) Atromitos	
22	Riccardo Meili	(Switzerland)	Goalkeeper	6 March 1982 (27)	(Switzerland) Concordia Basel	
30	Tomáš Belic	(Slovakia)	Goalkeeper	2 July 1978 (31)	(Czech Republic) Teplice	
Defenders
2	Giannis Maniatis	(Greece)	Right back	12 October 1986 (23)	(Greece) Thiva	
3	Mehmet Hetemaj	(Finland)	Centre back	8 December 1987 (22)	(Finland) Viikingit	
4	Sékou Berthé	(Mali)	Centre back	7 October 1977 (32)	Free	
5	Martin Latka	(Czech Republic)	Centre back	28 September 1984 (25)	(Czech Republic) Slavia Prague	
6	Fousseni Diawara	(Mali)	Right back	28 August 1980 (25)	(France) Saint-Étienne	
13	Vangelis Koutsopoulos	(Greece)	Left back	2 February 1980 (29)	(Greece) PAOK	
19	Ivica Majstorović	(Croatia)	Defensive midfielder	20 September 1981 (28)	(Germany) Unterhaching	
23	Dimitris Siovas	(Greece)	Centre back	16 September 1988 (21)	(Greece) Skoda Xanthi U20	
25	Giannis Kontoes	(Greece)	Centre-back/Right back/Left back	24 May 1986 (23)	(Greece) Panionios U20	
27	Matthias Langkamp	(Germany)	Centre back	24 February 1984 (25)	(Germany) Arminia Bielefeld	
31	Georgios Tzavellas	(Greece)	Left back	26 November 1987 (22)	(Greece) Kerkyra	
32	Pavel Plaskonny	(Belarus)	Centre back	29 January 1985 (24)	(Belarus) Shakhtyor Soligorsk	
34	Theodoros Santamouris	(Greece)	Centre back	14 March 1989 (20)	(Greece) Panionios U20	
37	Christos Maniatis	(Greece)	Right back	5 June 1991 (20)	(Greece) Panionios U20	
Midfielders
7	Manolis Skoufalis	(Greece)	Midfielder	21 August 1978 (31)	(Greece) Kerkyra	
10	Dimitrios Koiliaras	(Greece)	Midfielder	23 March 1986 (23)	(Greece) Ergotelis	
14	Grigoris Makos	(Greece)	Midfielder	18 January 1987 (22)	(Greece) Panionios U20	
15	Bennard Yao Kumordzi	(Ghana)	Midfielder	21 March 1985 (24)	(Greece) Egaleo	
16	Fabián Estoyanoff	(Uruguay)	Winger	27 September 1982 (27)	(Spain) Valencia	
20	Fanouris Goundoulakis	(Greece)	Midfielder	13 July 1983 (26)	(Greece) Kalamata	
21	Giorgos Barkoglou	(Greece)	Midfielder	8 July 1978 (31)	(Greece) Apollon Kalamarias	
24	Thanasis Palaskas	(Greece)	Midfielder/Centre-back	14 January 1986 (23)	(Greece) Panionios U20	
28	Marios Nicolaou	(Cyprus)	Defensive midfielder	4 October 1983 (26)	(Cyprus) Aris Limassol	
33	Giannoulis Fakinos	(Greece)	Midfielder	9 July 1989 (20)	(Greece) Olympiacos	
35	Dimitrios Anastasopoulos	(Greece)	Midfielder	11 April 1990 (19)	(Greece) Panionios U20	
41	Davor Kukec	(Croatia)	Winger	16 March 1986 (23)	(Croatia) Inter Zaprešić	
41	Alexandros Makos	(Greece)	Midfielder	5 April 1991(18)	(Greece) Panionios U20	
Forwards
8	Yann Ekra	(Ivory Coast)	Striker	10 December 1990(19)	(England) Hull City	On Loan
9	Álvaro Recoba	(Uruguay)	Supporting striker/Attacking midfielder/Winger	17 March 1976 (33)	(Italy) Inter Milan	
11	Anderson Gonzaga	(Brazil)	Forward	29 March 1983(26)	(Bolivia) Blooming	
16	Fabián Estoyanoff	(Uruguay)	Winger	27 September 1982(27)	(Spain) Valencia	
18	Michael Delura	(Germany)	Forward	1 July 1985(24)	(Germany) Schalke 04	
26	Alexandre D'Acol	(Brazil)	Forward	18 July 1986(23)	(Greece) Olympiacos	
46	Neophytos Chrisostomou	(Greece)	Forward	11 September 1989(20)	(Greece) Panionios U20	
50	Luís Lourenço	(Portugal)	Forward	5 June 1983(26)	(Portugal) Vitória Setúbal	
Manager
	Joti Stamatopoulos	(Greece)		1 January 1960 (54)		

=== Transfers ===
==== In ====
Period	Pos.	Name	From	Fee
Summer	MF	(Greece) Dimitrios Kiliaras	(Greece) Ergotelis	€528.000
Summer	MF	(Greece) Giorgos Barkoglou	(Greece) Apollon Kalamarias	€61.600
Summer	DF	(Germany) Matthias Langkamp	(Germany) Arminia Bielefeld	Free
Summer	DF	(Czech Republic) Pavel Drsek	(Germany) VfL Bochum	Free
Summer	GK	(Greece) Konstantinos Andriolas	(Greece) Atromitos	Free
Summer	FW	(Brazil) Alexandre Joaquim D'Acol	-	-
Summer	DF	(Greece) Dimitris Siovas	-	-
Summer	GK	(Switzerland) Riccardo Meili	(Switzerland) Concordia Basel	Free
Summer	FW	(Uruguay) Álvaro Recoba	(Italy) Inter Milan	Free
Summer	FW	(Uruguay) Fabián Estoyanoff	(Spain) Valencia	Free
Summer	FW	(Brazil) Anderson Gonzaga	(Bolivia) Blooming	€123.000
Summer	MF	(Greece) Dimitrios Anastasopoulos	(Greece) Athinaikos	-
Summer	DF	(Greece) Theodoros Santamouris	(Greece) Panionios U20	-
Summer	MF	(Greece) Stamatis Barakos	(Greece) Chania	Return From Loan
Summer	DF	(Greece) Lazaros Bourelakos	(Greece) Thiva	Return From Loan
Summer	FW	(Albania) Albi Kondi	(Greece) Chaidari	Return From Loan
Winter	GK	(Slovakia) Tomáš Belic	(Czech Republic) Teplice	Free
Winter	DF	(Czech Republic) Martin Latka	(Czech Republic) Slavia Prague	€528.000
Winter	MF	(Croatia) Davor Kukec	(Croatia) Inter Zaprešić	€264.000
Winter	FW	(Ivory Coast) Yann Ekra	(England) Hull City U19	On Loan

==== Out ====
Period	Pos.	Name	To	Fee
Summer	MF	(Argentina) Darío Fernández	(Israel) Beitar Jerusalem	€748.000
Summer	GK	(Greece) Kleopas Giannou	(Cyprus) AEL Limassol	Free
Summer	MF	(Brazil) Wagner	-	-
Summer	FW	(Greece) Nikolaos Tsaousis	(Greece) Korinthos	-
Summer	FW	(Algeria) Rafik Djebbour	(Greece) AEK Athens	€2.552.000
Summer	DF	(Greece) Efthimios Gousoulis	(Greece) Olympiacos Volos	Loan
Summer	FW	(Greece) Christos Aravidis	(Greece) Ethnikos Asteras	Loan
Summer	MF	(Greece) Stamatis Barakos	(Greece) Koropi F.C.	Loan
Summer	DF	(Greece) Lazaros Bourelakos	(Greece) Koropi F.C.	Loan
Summer	GK	(Greece) Charalambos Tabasis	(Greece) Ilisiakos	Loan
Summer	DF	(Greece) Andreas Iraklis	(Greece) Koropi	Loan
Summer	DF	(Greece) Spiros Gitsalis	(Greece) Fostiras	Loan
Summer	DF	(Greece) Theodoros Koumparoulis	(Greece) Egaleo	Loan
Winter	FW	(Greece) Lampros Choutos	(Greece) PAOK	€132.000
Winter	MF	(Greece) Giannoulis Fakinos	(Greece) Ilioupoli	Free
Winter	DF	(Czech Republic) Pavel Drsek	(Czech Republic) Kladno	Free
