= Kostas Mitroglou =

Greek footballer (born 1988)

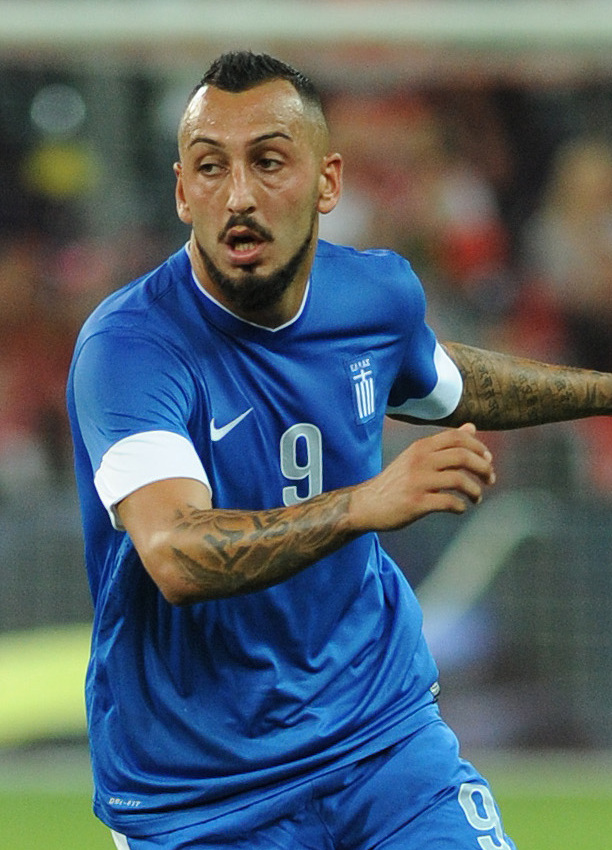
- Mitroglou playing for Greece in 2013

Personal information
- Full name: Konstantinos Mitroglou
- Date of birth: 12 March 1988 (age 38)
- Place of birth: Krinides, Greece
- Height: 1.88 m (6 ft 2 in)
- Position: Striker

Youth career
- 1994–2001: TuS Preussen Vluyn
- 2001–2003: SV Neukirchen
- 2003–2005: MSV Duisburg
- 2005–2006: Borussia Mönchengladbach

Senior career*
Years	Team	Apps	(Gls)
2006–2007	Borussia Mönchengladbach II	23	(0)
2007–2014	Olympiacos	92	(41)
2011	→ Panionios (loan)	11	(8)
2011–2012	→ Atromitos (loan)	34	(17)
2014–2016	Fulham	3	(0)
2014–2015	→ Olympiacos (loan)	24	(16)
2015–2016	→ Benfica (loan)	32	(20)
2016–2017	Benfica	28	(16)
2017–2021	Marseille	32	(12)
2019	→ Galatasaray (loan)	7	(1)
2019–2020	→ PSV (loan)	13	(1)
2021–2022	Aris	9	(2)
2023	Rheurdt-Schaephuysen	7	(2)
2023	Scherpenberg	5	(3)
Total		320	(139)

International career
2005–2007	Greece U19	14	(12)
2007–2010	Greece U21	19	(5)
2009–2019	Greece	65	(17)
Medal record
Greece
Runner-up	UEFA European Under-19 Championship	2007
- * Club domestic league appearances and goals

Kostas Mitroglou (Greek: Κώστας Μήτρογλου, pronounced [konsta(n)ˈdinos ˈkostas ˈmitroɣlu]; born 12 March 1988) is a Greek former professional footballer who played as a striker. He is nicknamed "Mitrogoal" and "Pistolero" by fans due to his goalscoring abilities.

Raised in Germany, Mitroglou started his career at Borussia Mönchengladbach, where he established himself as an excellent prospect. He was signed by Olympiacos in the summer of 2007 and had two loan spells at Panionios and Atromitos before establishing himself in the team. He transferred to Premier League club Fulham in 2014 for a club record £12 million, and they were relegated in his only season, in which he was troubled by injury. He then returned to Olympiacos on loan and then to Benfica in Portugal, before joining the latter on a permanent basis in 2016. With Benfica, he would win five major honours, including back-to-back league titles, and set his single-season scoring record with 27 goals.

A full international since 2009, Mitroglou has earned over 60 caps for the Greece national team. He was selected in their squads for UEFA Euro 2012 and the 2014 FIFA World Cup.

== Club career ==
=== Early career ===
Mitroglou was born on 12 March 1988, in Krinides, Kavala, Greece, and emigrated as an infant with his parents from his native country to Germany. He grew up in Neukirchen-Vluyn, North Rhine-Westphalia. He began his career at TuS Preussen Vluyn. At age 11, he scored 24 goals in 16 matches. He then played for SV Neukirchen. In 2003, he joined MSV Duisburg. Later on, he joined Borussia Mönchengladbach. Mitroglou was a dominant player in the Under 19 Bundesliga. He scored 14 goals in 10 matches.

=== Olympiacos ===
==== 2007–08 season ====
After impressing at the 2007 UEFA European Under-19 Championship, Mitroglou was signed by Greek champions Olympiacos. His first official goal for Olympiacos came in a 2–1 away win against Diagoras in the Greek Cup after an assist by Luciano Galletti. His first Super League goal came in a 4–0 home win against Levadiakos.

During the final stages of the season, Mitroglou played an important part in helping Olympiacos claim their 36th league title, scoring the last-minute winning goal (2–1) in their match against AEL, this time assisted by Mirnes Šišić. His first goal in the Super League came in a 4–0 home win against Levadiakos. He then scored two goals in the last league fixture against Iraklis to seal a 3–1 win. He also scored in a 2–2 away draw against Iraklis in the Greek Cup semi-finals, after an assist from Michalis Konstantinou. In the 2007 Greek Super Cup, he scored the only goal as Olympiacos defeated AEL 1–0.

==== 2008–09 season ====
For the 2008–09 season, Olympiacos appointed Ernesto Valverde as their new head coach, who dropped Mitroglou because he wanted his team to play a quicker and more offensive style of football. Mitroglou therefore made fewer appearances than the prior season. He scored in a 2–0 away win against Nordsjælland in the first round of the 2008–09 UEFA Cup. In the Super League, he scored two goals in a home win 4–1 against Panionios.

==== 2009–10 season ====
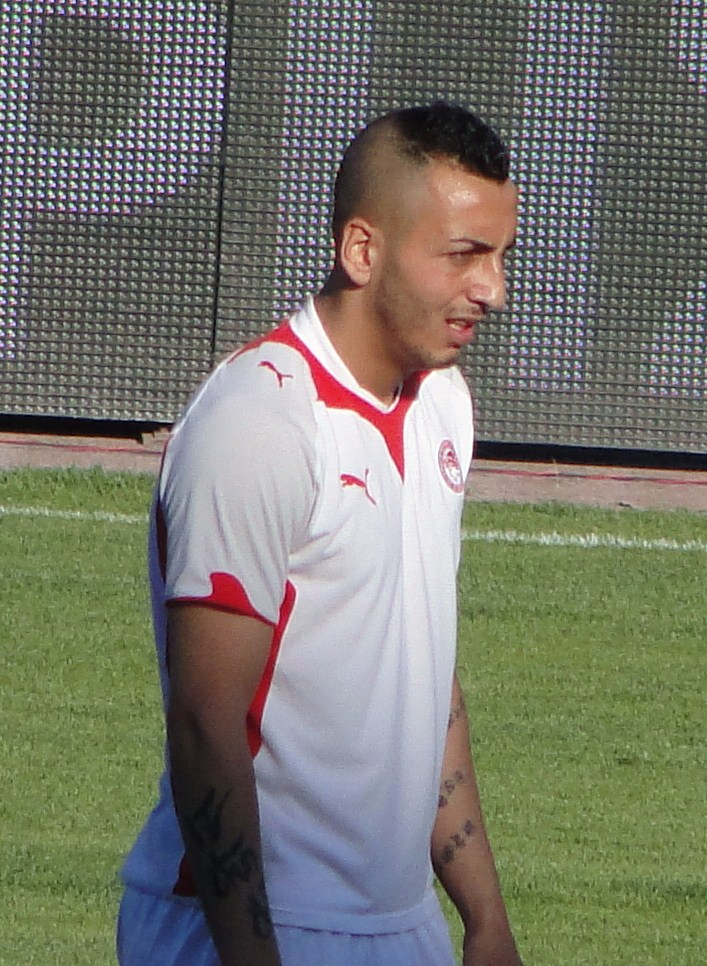
Mitroglou playing for Olympiacos in May 2010

After Valverde left Olympiacos, Mitroglou saw increased playing time. He scored his first goal of the season against Sheriff Tiraspol in a 2–0 first leg away win in the UEFA Champions League play-offs, also scoring in the return leg (a 1–0 home win). Mitroglou scored the equalizing goal in an eventual 2–1 defeat of Standard Liège in a UEFA Champions League group stage match on 21 October 2009. He also scored in home wins against Asteras Tripolis (3–0) and Ergotelis (2–1). His next goal came in an away draw (2–2) against PAS Giannina after an assist by Dudu Cearense. He also scored a goal in a heavy 3–1 away loss to Panserraikos.

Mitroglou scored both goals in a 2–0 win against rivals Panathinaikos after assists by Dudu Cearense and Jaouad Zairi. He added two more goals in a 5–1 home win against Levadiakos. He scored in the club's 2–1 loss to Bordeaux in the Champions League round of 16, which saw Olympiacos eliminated following a 3–1 aggregate loss. His next goal came in Olympiacos' 2–0 win against Atromitos.

==== 2010–11 season ====
Ernesto Valverde returned as head coach of Olympiacos for the 2010–11 season. Despite being a starter and scoring a spectacular goal in the opening league match against Iraklis (1–2 away loss), Mitroglou only made four more appearances as Valverde chose to use Kevin Mirallas and Marko Pantelić instead. Mitroglou participated in the international match "8th Match Against Poverty" on 14 December 2010 (held at the Georgios Karaiskakis Stadium) as a player in the Olympiacos All-Star team and scored two goals.

==== Loan to Panionios ====
In January 2011, Mitroglou joined Panionios on a six-month loan from Olympiacos. In his debut, he scored both goals in a historic 2–0 away win against Aris, the first for the club in 50 years. His next goals came at a 1–1 home draw against Panathinaikos and a 1–1 away draw against AEK Athens, the latter after an assist from Georgios Galitsios. He scored the winning goal (2–1) against Atromitos and converted a penalty at the 3–3 home draw against AEL. He added another one at a 1–1 away draw against Iraklis. He scored his last goal at the 2–1 away win against Kerkyra after an assist from Fanouris Goundoulakis. Mitroglou ended this year with nine goals in the Superleague, one with Olympiacos and eight with Panionios.

==== Loan to Atromitos ====
Mitroglou was once again loaned, this time to Atromitos for the 2011–12 campaign. He scored his first goal at a 1–0 away win against Aris after an assist from Miguel Sebastián Garcia. He next scored at a 1–1 home draw against Panathinaikos after an assist of Denis Epstein. He scored two goals in a 2–1 home win against Panetolikos and one in a 1–0 away win against Doxa Drama. His next goal was at a 1–1 home draw against Levadiakos, once again assisted by Denis Epstein. He went on to score goals in the victories against Ergotelis (1–0) and OFI (2–0).

Mitroglou's next goal came from the penalty spot in a 1–1 away draw against Panetolikos. He scored a goal in a 2–1 away win against PAS Giannina and scored two goals in another 2–1 away win against his former loan team Panionios. He next scored at a 2–0 home win against Doxa Drama and a 2–2 away draw against Levadiakos. He scored the winning goal (1–0) against Skoda Xanthi His next goal came with a penalty kick in a 2–2 away draw against Ergotelis.

Mitroglou also scored a goal in the semi-finals of the Greek Cup against Asteras Tripoli, sending his team reach the final against parent club Olympiacos. He finished the season with 16 league goals, helping Atromitos to reach the Super League play-offs for the first time, where he added one more goal in a 1–1 home draw against PAOK after an assist from Ilias Anastasakos. At the end of the campaign, he was voted the Super League Greece Footballer of the Year.

==== 2012–13 season ====
The 2012–13 season found Mitroglou back at parent club Olympiacos. After Ernesto Valverde left, Mitroglou was favoured by new head coach Leonardo Jardim. Mitroglou showed a good form in the pre-season training scoring a total of three goals, two of them in a friendly against Spanish side Málaga at the Karaiskakis Stadium. However, the season started a bit irregular for him, as he had to compete with first-choice striker Rafik Djebbour in the starting 11. He therefore did not receive much playing time and often played as a substitute. His first goal of the season came in a 2–1 away win against PAS Giannina after an assist from Djebbour. In the same match, he provided an assist on Olympicaos' second goal, scored by Djebbour.

With Djebbour absent due to injury, Mitroglou was a starter for the second group game of the UEFA Champions League against Arsenal in the Emirates Stadium, where he scored the equalizer in an eventual 3–1 loss. He next scored a goal in a 2–0 home win against OFI after an assist from Paulo Machado. He scored again in the Champions League by scoring the winning goal in a 2–1 away win against Montpellier after an assist from Djamel Abdoun. He also added another goal against Montpellier in the return fixture on 6 November as Olympiacos claimed a 3–1 victory.

Mitroglou's scoring streak continued as he next scored two goals in a 4–0 away win against rivals AEK Athens, and one in each 2–0 victory against AO Kerkyra and Panachaiki, the latter being a Greek Cup fixture. He scored his fourth Champions League goal at the 2–1 home win against Arsenal. His first goal of 2013, came in a 3–0 home win against Veria, after an assist of Juan Pablo Pino. On 9 February, he scored the lone goal against Asteras Tripoli at the last minute of the match, giving Olympiacos the 1–0 away win. He scored the winning goal again at the 1–0 away win against AO Kerkyra.

Mitroglou's next goals came in a comfortable 4–0 away win against Platanias and the classical derby against Panathinaikos, which ended 1–1. In the Greek Cup semi-finals against Panthrakikos, he scored two goals in the first leg to give a 6–2 home win and another two goals at the returning leg (2–1 away win) as Olympiacos progressed to the final 8–3 on aggregate. In the last league match, he scored the opening for a 2–1 home win against Panionios.

==== 2013–14 season ====
During the pre-season preparation at Seefeld, Mitroglou scored a goal in a 2–1 friendly win against Azerbaijani club Simurq PIK.

On the second matchday of the Super League Greece, he provided an assist to David Fuster in a 2–1 home win against Atromitos. On 1 September 2013, he scored his first career hat-trick in a 5–0 away win against Levadiakos after three assists from Fuster. He scored his second hat-trick on the next fixture in a 4–0 home win against Skoda Xanthi, becoming the first player in Olympiacos history—as well as the Greek League generally—to score two consecutive hat-tricks, while also having also scored in an international match between these two fixtures.

Mitroglou scored his third hat-trick of the season on 2 October, scoring all three goals in a 3–0 away win against Anderlecht in the UEFA Champions League group stage. He became the first Greek player to complete a hat-trick in the Champions League, and along with Predrag Đorđević is one of only two Olympiacos players to have scored a hat-trick in the Champions League. Mitroglou's scoring streak continued as he scored another hat-trick four days later in a comfortable 6–0 home win against Veria, while also assisting a goal to Joel Campbell. His next goal came in an away win (1–4) against Platanias after an assist from Alejandro Domínguez, a match in which he also provided the assist for Javier Saviola's goal. On 24 October, Mitroglou assisted Domínguez's goal against Benfica in a 1–1 draw in the UEFA Champions League. He next scored two goals at a home win 5–1 against OFI with two headers after two assists from Joel Campbell. He next scored the winning goal in an away win (1–0) against Panathinaikos. He next scored a goal at a home win 4–0 against PAOK after another assist from Joel Campbell.

On 27 November, Mitroglou suffered an injury in a 2–1 away loss against Paris Saint-Germain, keeping him on the sidelines for over a month. On 19 December, amid much transfer speculation, Mitroglou renewed his contract with Olympiacos until 2017. On 10 January 2014, he recovered to come on as a substitute against Atromitos.

=== Fulham ===
On 31 January 2014, Mitroglou signed a four-and-a-half-year contract for a transfer fee believed in the region of £12 million with English Premier League club Fulham. On 22 February, he made his debut for Fulham in a 1–1 draw at West Bromwich Albion, replacing Hugo Rodallega after 61 minutes. Mitroglou was the highest transfer fee in Fulham's history, and despite Fulham pinning their hopes of staying in the Premier League on the Greece international, they were relegated in May 2014. Due to various injuries and fitness problems, Mitroglou played in only two more Premier League matches before the end of the 2013–14 season, starting only one, away against Cardiff City.

==== Return to Olympiacos (Loan) ====
On 31 August 2014, Mitroglou returned to Olympiacos on a season-long loan from Fulham. He made his second debut on 13 September, replacing Dimitrios Diamantakos in the 55th minute of a 3–0 home win over OFI. Three days later, he scored what proved to be the game winner in a 3–2 win over Atlético Madrid in the UEFA Champions League group stage.

=== Benfica ===
On 6 August 2015, Mitroglou joined Portuguese champions Benfica on loan until the end of the season. He made his debut three days later, replacing compatriot Andreas Samaris for the final 18 minutes of a 0–1 loss to rivals Sporting CP in the 2015 Supertaça Cândido de Oliveira at the Estádio Municipal de Aveiro. In their first match of the Primeira Liga season against Estoril, he opened the scoring in a 4–0 win at the Estádio da Luz. On 11 September, he scored in each half of a 6–0 win in the league against Lisbon neighbours Belenenses.

On 23 January 2016, Mitroglou scored with a backheel goal in a 3–1 win against Arouca, and on 3 February, he scored a hat-trick against Belenenses in a 0–5 away victory. It was his first hat-trick in the season, scoring for the fifth consecutive match in a row. On 13 February, he opened the score in a 2–1 home loss against rivals Porto, struggling for the win before goalkeeper Iker Casillas made a save at close quarters to stop him from scoring the equalizer. One week later, he scored for the seventh match in a row by opening the score in a 1–3 win at Paços de Ferreira; at the final whistle, a Benfica supporter entered the field and knelt before Mitroglou, and then tried to shine his boots with a scarf. On 5 March, Mitroglou scored the only goal in the Lisbon derby at Sporting CP's Estádio José Alvalade, giving Benfica the lead in the league, ahead of their opponents. Later on, he scored a brace in a 5–1 home win against Braga in the Primeira Liga on 1 April, increasing his tally to 18 goals in the league, with 13 goals scored in 12 matches. He ended the league campaign with 20 goals in 32 matches, winning the Primeira Liga title on 15 May after a 4–1 home win over Nacional.

Two days after the league title celebrations, Benfica announced Mitroglou had signed a permanent contract with the club set to last until 2020, for a €7 million transfer fee, as disclosed by Football Leaks. On 18 January 2017, he scored a hat-trick in a 6–2 home win over Leixões in the Taça de Portugal quarter-finals. On 28 February 2017, Mitroglou scored twice against Estoril in the first leg of the Taça de Portugal semi-finals.

=== Marseille ===
On 31 August 2017, French Ligue 1 club Marseille announced the signing of Mitroglou on a four-year contract for a transfer fee of €15 million to Benfica. On 28 September, Mitroglou made his competitive debut for Marseille in a 2017–18 UEFA Europa League group stage 1–0 away loss against Red Bull Salzburg, coming on as a substitute in the 79th minute for Maxime Lopez.

On 6 February 2018, Mitroglou scored his first hat-trick for Marseille—to go along with one assist,—in a 9–0 blowout win over Bourg-en-Bresse in the Coupe de France.

==== Loan to Galatasaray ====
On 31 January 2019, Mitroglou was loaned out to Galatasaray in Süper Lig until 30 June 2020.

==== Loan to PSV Eindhoven ====
On 22 August 2019, PSV Eindhoven announced they would take on Mitroglou on a loan until the end of the 2019–20 season.

=== Aris ===
On 25 January 2021, Mitroglou signed with Greek club, Aris. On 21 February, he scored his first goal with the new team in the Super League against his former club Olympiacos at the Karaiskakis Stadium, in a match ended 1–1.

=== SpVgg Rheurdt-Schaephuysen ===
In January 2023, Mitroglou signed with German club SpVgg Rheurdt-Schaephuysen in amateur league Kreisliga A Moers. The club were playing in the 9th tier of the German football pyramid and were coached by Robert Kruppa, with whom Mitroglou played with in the Duisburg academy. The transfer of the former Champions League veteran to Germany's amateur league was described as "sensational".

=== SV Scherpenberg ===
On 27 June 2023 Mitroglou signed with Landesliga club SV Scherpenberg. On 3 September, after playing five games and scoring three goals, Mitroglou left Scherpenberg.

== International career ==
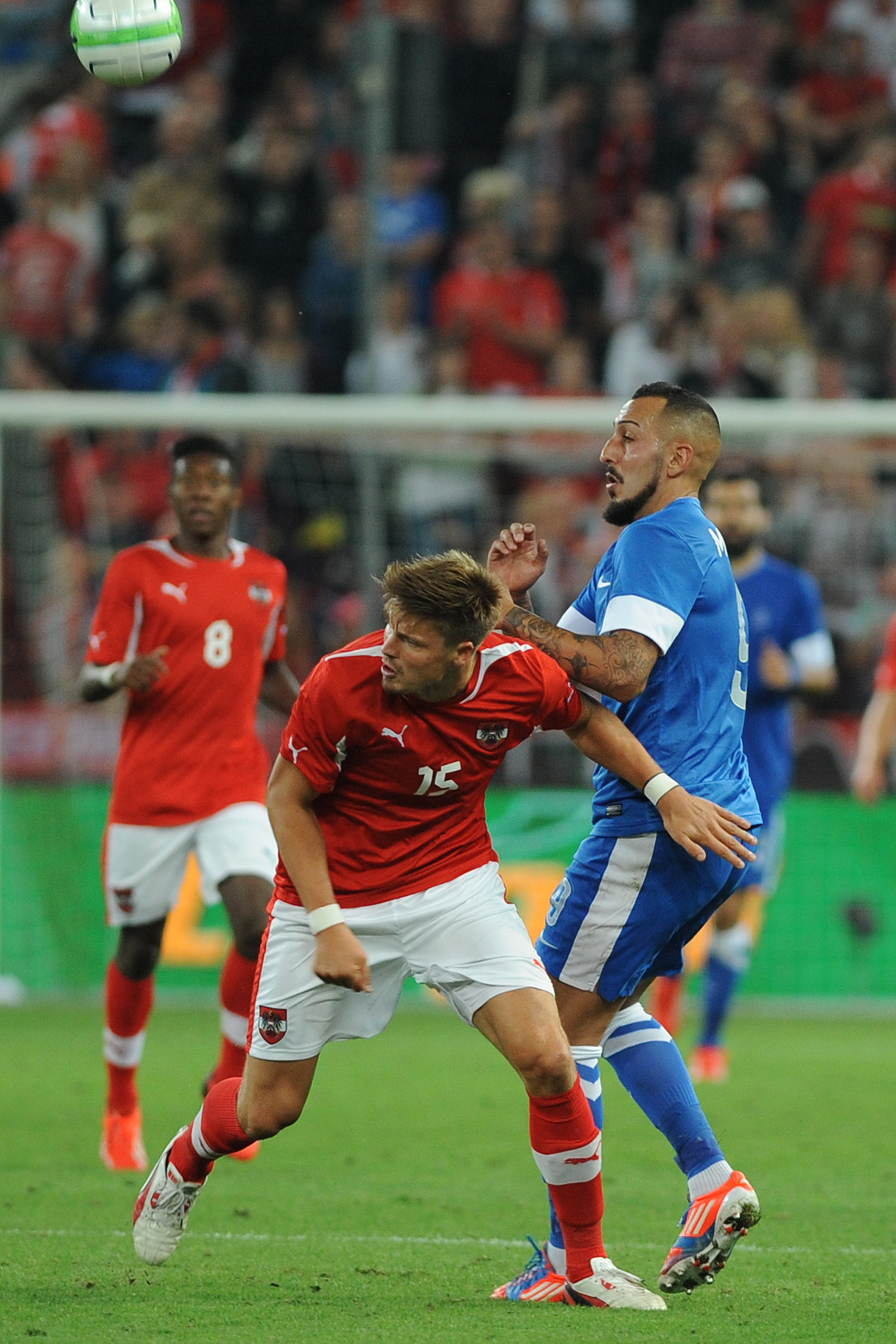
Mitroglou challenging Sebastian Prödl of Austria in August 2013

=== Junior teams ===
Mitroglou was first called up for the Greece national under-19 team in 2005. He scored a goal against the Netherlands in a 3–2 away win in 2007 UEFA European Under-19 Championship qualification. He also scored two goals in a 3–1 home loss against Germany in the same campaign. Mitroglou also scored in a 2–0 away win against Italy, two goals in a 2–2 away draw against Croatia and a goal in a 4–0 home win against Sweden. He participated at the 2007 UEFA European Under-19 Championship, in which he scored the only goal against Portugal at Linzer Stadion in the group stage, as well as in a 1–1 draw against Austria at the Waldstadion. In the knock-out stage, he scored a goal against Germany in a 3–2 win at Vorwärts Stadium. Mitroglou finished as the top goalscorer of the competition with three goals.

In 2007, Mitroglou was promoted to the Greece under-21 team. He scored two goals in a 3–1 home win against Macedonia in the UEFA European Under-21 Championship qualifiers, and later a goal in a 1–1 home draw against England and the only goal against Lithuania as the campaign continued.

=== Senior team ===
In 2009, Mitroglou was selected for the senior Greece side for the first time. He scored his first goal in a 3–2 away win over Norway on 15 August 2012. On 11 September 2012, he scored a goal in a 2014 FIFA World Cup qualifying match against Lithuania, which ended in a 2–0 victory. He went on to score both goals in a 2–0 away friendly win against Austria on 14 August 2013.

Mitroglou scored the only goal in a victory over Liechtenstein, after an assist from Vasilis Torosidis, in their penultimate World Cup qualifying match on 6 September 2013. He scored two goals on 15 November in Greece's 3–1 home win against Romania in the first leg of their 2014 FIFA World Cup qualifying play-off. Four days later, he scored the opening goal of the return leg in Romania, which ended in a 1–1 draw and sent Greece to the World Cup final stages in Brazil with a 4–2 aggregate victory.

== Career statistics ==
=== Club ===
As of match played 9 May 2021

Club	Season	League			National cup (Note: Includes Greek Cup, Taça de Portugal, Coupe de France, Turkish Cup, KNVB Cup)		League cup (Note: Includes Taça da Liga, Coupe de la Ligue)		Continental		Other		Total	
Club	Season	Division	Apps	Goals	Apps	Goals	Apps	Goals	Apps	Goals	Apps	Goals	Apps	Goals
Olympiacos	2007–08	Super League Greece	11	4	4	2	–		2 (Note: Appearances in UEFA Champions League)	0	1 (Note: Appearance in Greek Super Cup)	1	18	7
Olympiacos	2008–09	Super League Greece	7	2	3	0	–		5 (Note: Two appearances in UEFA Champions League, three appearances and one goal in UEFA Cup)	1	–		15	3
Olympiacos	2009–10	Super League Greece	32	9	1	1	–		12	4	0	0	45	14
Olympiacos	2010–11	Super League Greece	5	1	1	0	–		4 (Note: Appearances in UEFA Europa League)	0	–		10	1
Olympiacos	2012–13	Super League Greece	25	11	9	5	–		8 (Note: Six appearances and four goals in UEFA Champions League, two appearances in UEFA Europa League)	4	–		42	20
Olympiacos	2013–14	Super League Greece	12	14	2	0	–		5	3	–		19	17
Olympiacos	2014–15	Super League Greece	24	16	2	0	–		8 (Note: Six appearances and two goals in UEFA Champions League, two appearances and one goal in UEFA Europa League)	3	–		34	19
Olympiacos	Total		116	57	22	8	–		44	15	1	1	183	81
Panionios	2010–11	Super League Greece	11	8	–		–		–		–		11	8
Atromitos	2011–12	Super League Greece	34	17	5	2	–		–		–		39	19
Fulham	2013–14	Premier League	3	0	0	0	0	0	–		–		3	0
Benfica	2015–16	Primeira Liga	32	20	1	1	3	2	7	2	1 (Note: Appearance in Supertaça Cândido de Oliveira)	0	44	25
Benfica	2016–17	Primeira Liga	28	16	4	9	2	1	6	1	1	0	41	27
Benfica	Total		60	36	5	10	5	3	13	3	2	0	85	52
Marseille	2017–18	Ligue 1	19	9	3	3	1	1	7	0	–		30	13
Marseille	2018–19	Ligue 1	14	3	0	0	1	0	5	0	–		20	3
Marseille	Total		32	12	3	3	2	1	12	0	–		50	16
Galatasaray	2018–19	Süper Lig	7	1	2	1	–		–		–		9	2
PSV	2019–20	Eredivisie	14	1	1	1	–		4	1	0	0	19	3
Aris	2020–21	Super League Greece	9	2	1	0	–		–		–		10	2
Career total			287	134	39	25	6	4	73	19	3	1	410	183

=== International ===
National team	Year	Apps	Goals
Greece
Greece	2009	1	0
Greece	2010	3	0
Greece	2011	7	0
Greece	2012	9	2
Greece	2013	8	6
Greece	2014	10	0
Greece	2015	8	1
Greece	2016	6	3
Greece	2017	6	4
Greece	2018	5	1
Greece	2019	1	0
Total		64	17

As of match played 12 October 2018. Greece score listed first, score column indicates score after each Mitroglou goal.

International goals by date, venue, cap, opponent, score, result and competition
No.	Date	Venue	Cap	Opponent	Score	Result	Competition
1	15 August 2012	Ullevaal Stadion, Oslo, Norway	15	Norway	3–1	3–2	Friendly
2	11 September 2012	Karaiskakis Stadium, Piraeus, Greece	17	Lithuania	2–0	2–0	2014 FIFA World Cup qualification
3	14 August 2013	Red Bull Arena, Salzburg, Austria	22	Austria	1–0	2–0	Friendly
4	14 August 2013	Red Bull Arena, Salzburg, Austria	22	Austria	2–0	2–0	Friendly
5	6 September 2013	Rheinpark Stadion, Vaduz, Liechtenstein	23	Liechtenstein	1–0	1–0	2014 FIFA World Cup qualification
6	15 November 2013	Karaiskakis Stadium, Piraeus, Greece	27	Romania	1–0	3–1	2014 FIFA World Cup qualification
7	15 November 2013	Karaiskakis Stadium, Piraeus, Greece	27	Romania	3–1	3–1	2014 FIFA World Cup qualification
8	19 November 2013	Arena Națională, Bucharest, Romania	28	Romania	1–0	1–1	2014 FIFA World Cup qualification
9	11 October 2015	Karaiskakis Stadium, Piraeus, Greece	44	Hungary	3–3	4–3	UEFA Euro 2016 qualification
10	1 September 2016	Philips Stadion, Eindhoven, Netherlands	48	Netherlands	1–1	2–1	Friendly
11	6 September 2016	Estádio Algarve, Faro/Loulé, Portugal	49	Gibraltar	1–0	4–1	2018 FIFA World Cup qualification
12	7 October 2016	Karaiskakis Stadium, Piraeus, Greece	50	Cyprus	1–0	2–0	2018 FIFA World Cup qualification
13	25 March 2017	King Baudouin Stadium, Brussels, Belgium	53	Belgium	1–0	1–1	2018 FIFA World Cup qualification
14	7 October 2017	GSP Stadium, Nicosia, Cyprus	55	Cyprus	1–1	2–1	2018 FIFA World Cup qualification
15	10 October 2017	Karaiskakis Stadium, Piraeus, Greece	56	Gibraltar	2–0	4–0	2018 FIFA World Cup qualification
16	10 October 2017	Karaiskakis Stadium, Piraeus, Greece	56	Gibraltar	3–0	4–0	2018 FIFA World Cup qualification
17	12 October 2018	Olympic Stadium, Athens, Greece	61	Hungary	1–0	1–0	2018–19 UEFA Nations League C

== Honours ==
=== Club ===
Olympiacos

- Super League Greece: 2007–08, 2008–09, 2010–11, 2012–13, 2013–14, 2014–15
- Greek Cup: 2007–08, 2008–09, 2012–13, 2014–15
- Greek Super Cup: 2007

Benfica

- Primeira Liga: 2015–16, 2016–17
- Taça de Portugal: 2016–17
- Taça da Liga: 2015–16
- Supertaça Cândido de Oliveira: 2016

Marseille

- UEFA Europa League runner-up: 2017–18

Galatasaray

- Süper Lig: 2018–19
- Turkish Cup: 2018–19
- Turkish Super Cup: 2019

=== International ===
Greece U19

- UEFA European Under-19 Championship runner-up: 2007

=== Individual ===
- UEFA European Under-19 Championship Golden Boot: 2007 (3 goals) (Note: shared with Änis Ben-Hatira and Kévin Monnet-Paquet)
- Super League Greece Greek Footballer of the Year: 2011–12
- Greek Cup Top goalscorer: 2012–13 (5 goals) (Note: shared with Stefanos Athanasiadis)
- SJPF Primeira Liga Team of the Year: 2016
- Taça de Portugal Top goalscorer: 2016–17 (9 goals)
