= 2008–09 Super League Greece =

73rd season of top-tier football league in Greece

Super League Greece
- Season: 2008–09
- Dates: 30 August 2008 – 31 May 2009
- Champions: Olympiacos; 37th Greek title
- Relegated: OFI; Panserraikos; Thrasyvoulos
- Champions League: Olympiacos; Panathinaikos
- Europa League: AEK Athens (via domestic cup); PAOK; AEL
- Matches: 252
- Goals: 519 (2.06 per match)
- Top goalscorer: Ismael Blanco; Luciano Galletti (14 goals each)
- Biggest home win: Olympiacos 5–0 Iraklis
- Biggest away win: Panserraikos 1–5 AEK Athens
- Highest scoring: AEL 4–3 OFI; OFI 4–3 Panthrakikos; Asteras Tripolis 3–4 Panionios; Ergotelis 2–5 Panionios

The 2008–09 Super League Greece was the 73rd season of the highest football league of Greece and the third under the name Super League. The season began on 31 August 2008 and ended on 26 April 2009. The league consisted of 16 teams. Participants were the 13 best teams from the 2007–08 season and three teams who have been promoted from Beta Ethniki. Olympiacos successfully defended their title after claiming their 37th title overall with three rounds remaining.

== Teams ==
Promoted from 2007–08 Beta Ethniki	Relegated from 2007–08 Super League Greece
Panserraikos; Thrasyvoulos; Panthrakikos	Atromitos; Veria; Apollon Kalamarias

=== Stadiums and personnel ===
Location of the 2008–09 Super League Greece teams

Team	Manager^{1}	Location	Stadium	Capacity
AEK Athens	(Bosnia and Herzegovina) Dušan Bajević	Athens (Marousi)	Athens Olympic Stadium	69,638
AEL	(Greece) Marinos Ouzounidis	Larissa	Alcazar Stadium	13,108
Aris	(Brazil) Mazinho	Thessaloniki (Charilaou)	Kleanthis Vikelidis Stadium	22,800
Asteras Tripolis	(Greece) Nikos Kostenoglou	Tripoli	Asteras Tripolis Stadium	4,200
Ergotelis	(Greece) Nikos Karageorgiou	Heraklion (Ammoudara)	Pankritio Stadium	26,400
Iraklis	(Ukraine) Oleh Protasov	Thessaloniki (Triandria)	Kaftanzoglio Stadium	27,560
Levadiakos	(Serbia) Momčilo Vukotić	Livadeia	Levadia Municipal Stadium	5,915
OFI	(Greece) Giannis Mantzourakis	Heraklion (Ammoudara)	Pankritio Stadium	26,400
Olympiacos	(Spain) Ernesto Valverde	Piraeus	Karaiskakis Stadium	33,334
Panathinaikos	(Netherlands) Henk ten Cate	Athens (Marousi)	Athens Olympic Stadium	69,638
Panionios	(Greece) Giotis Stamatopoulos	Athens (Nea Smyrni)	Nea Smyrni Stadium	11,700
Panserraikos	(Belgium) Hugo Broos	Serres	Serres Municipal Stadium	8,500
Panthrakikos	(Belgium) Emilio Ferrera	Komotini	Komotini Municipal Stadium	4,500
PAOK	(Portugal) Fernando Santos	Thessaloniki (Toumba)	Toumba Stadium	28,703
Skoda Xanthi	(Greece) Georgios Paraschos	Xanthi	Skoda Xanthi Arena	7,422
Thrasyvoulos	(Greece) Sakis Tsiolis	Athens (Fyli)	Fyli Municipal Stadium	3,142

- ^{1} On final match day of the season, played on 26 April 2009.

== Regular season ==
=== League table ===
Pos	Team	Pld	W	D	L	GF	GA	GD	Pts	Qualification or relegation
1	Olympiacos (C)	30	22	5	3	50	14	+36	71	Qualification for the Champions League third qualifying round
2	PAOK	30	18	9	3	39	16	+23	63	Qualification for the Play-offs
3	Panathinaikos	30	17	10	3	51	18	+33	61	Qualification for the Play-offs
4	AEK Athens	30	14	13	3	40	24	+16	55	Qualification for the Play-offs
5	AEL	30	12	13	5	36	26	+10	49	Qualification for the Play-offs
6	Aris	30	13	8	9	30	31	−1	47	
7	Skoda Xanthi	30	9	11	10	25	21	+4	38	
8	Panionios	30	10	7	13	40	40	0	37	
9	Ergotelis	30	9	9	12	31	39	−8	36	
10	Iraklis	30	8	9	13	22	38	−16	33 (Note: Head-to-head points: Iraklis 7, Panthrakikos 6, Asteras Tripolis 2.)	
11	Panthrakikos	30	9	6	15	23	37	−14	33	
12	Asteras Tripolis	30	7	12	11	33	31	+2	33	
13	Levadiakos	30	9	5	16	28	36	−8	32	
14	OFI (R)	30	5	9	16	30	50	−20	24 (Note: Head-to-head points: OFI 4, Panserraikos 1.)	Relegation to the Beta Ethniki
15	Panserraikos (R)	30	5	9	16	19	45	−26	24	Relegation to the Beta Ethniki
16	Thrasyvoulos (R)	30	3	5	22	22	53	−31	14	Relegation to the Beta Ethniki

Source: Super League Greece
Rules for classification: 1) Points; 2) Head-to-head points; 3) Head-to-head goal difference; 4) Play-offs (neutral ground).
(Note: Criterion 4 is only used if needed to decide champion, teams for relegation or teams for UEFA competitions).
(C) Champions; (R) Relegated

=== Results ===
Home \ Away	AEK	AEL	ARIS	AST	ERG	IRA	LEV	OFI	OLY	PAO	PGSS	PNS	PNT	PAOK	XAN	THR
AEK Athens		1–1	0–1	2–1	3–2	1–0	3–1	1–0	0–1	2–1	3–0	0–0	1–0	1–0	2–1	1–0
AEL	1–1		1–1	2–1	3–2	2–0	2–1	4–3	1–1	1–1	0–0	1–1	1–2	0–0	0–1	3–0
Aris	1–1	0–0		1–1	0–0	1–0	2–0	4–1	1–0	1–2	1–0	2–0	3–2	0–0	0–1	2–1
Asteras Tripolis	0–1	0–0	4–0		3–1	1–2	2–0	2–2	0–1	1–1	3–4	3–0	0–0	0–2	0–0	3–0
Ergotelis	1–1	2–1	3–0	0–1		0–1	1–1	1–3	1–0	1–0	2–5	2–2	0–1	0–0	0–0	1–2
Iraklis	0–1	0–2	0–1	2–1	0–0		1–0	1–1	0–3	0–0	2–1	1–2	0–0	1–1	1–0	1–1
Levadiakos	0–0	0–1	2–0	1–0	4–0	3–0		2–1	1–2	1–2	1–1	0–0	2–0	0–3	0–0	1–0
OFI	1–1	1–2	0–1	1–1	0–0	2–3	0–2		0–0	0–3	2–0	0–0	4–3	0–2	0–2	1–3
Olympiacos	2–0	0–1	2–1	3–1	2–0	5–0	1–0	2–1		0–0	4–1	4–1	2–0	2–0	2–1	2–1
Panathinaikos	0–0	3–0	4–0	1–1	2–3	2–2	2–0	3–1	0–0		2–1	3–0	3–0	3–0	2–0	3–0
Panionios	2–2	1–1	2–1	3–0	0–0	0–2	1–0	1–1	2–3	1–2		2–0	3–0	1–2	0–1	4–1
Panserraikos	1–5	1–3	1–2	0–0	0–2	0–0	1–0	1–2	0–1	0–0	0–1		1–2	1–1	1–0	1–0
Panthrakikos	1–1	0–1	0–0	0–0	1–2	1–0	1–3	2–0	0–2	1–3	1–0	2–1		0–1	0–0	1–0
PAOK	1–1	1–0	1–0	1–1	2–0	1–0	3–1	2–0	0–0	0–0	2–0	4–1	2–0		1–0	2–1
Skoda Xanthi	1–1	1–1	1–1	0–0	0–1	4–1	4–0	0–0	0–1	1–2	0–0	2–1	1–0	1–2		1–0
Thrasyvoulos	3–3	0–0	1–2	0–2	1–3	1–1	2–1	1–2	0–2	0–1	1–3	0–1	0–2	1–2	1–1	

Source: Worldfootball.net
Legend: Blue = home team win; Yellow = draw; Red = away team win.

== Play-offs ==
The play-offs for an additional Champions League spot were conducted in a home and away round robin format. Its participants have entered the mini-league with a number of bonus points based on their regular season record. Every team had the number of points earned by the fifth-placed team subtracted from its own number of points. The result was then divided through five and rounded to the nearest whole number to determine the number of bonus points.

The teams started the play-offs with the following number of points:

- PAOK – 3 points ((63–49) / 5 = 2.8, rounded up to 3)
- Panathinaikos – 2 points ((61–49) / 5 = 2.4, rounded down to 2)
- AEK Athens – 1 point ((55–49) / 5 = 1.2, rounded down to 1)
- AEL – 0 points ((49 –49) / 5 = 0)

The play-off winners entered the third qualifying round of the UEFA Champions League. Since AEK Athens have lost the final of the 2008–09 Greek Cup to Champions League-bound Olympiacos, all three Greek Europa League spots (two via league, one via domestic cup) were allotted according to the position of the respective teams in the play-off.

Pos	Team	Pld	W	D	L	GF	GA	GD	Pts	Qualification	PAO	AEK	PAOK	AEL
2	Panathinaikos	6	5	1	0	12	3	+9	18	Qualification for the Champions League third qualifying round		1–1	4–1	3–1
3	AEK Athens	6	3	2	1	8	6	+2	12	Qualification for the Europa League play-off round	0–2		3–1	3–2
4	PAOK	6	2	0	4	5	9	−4	9	Qualification for the Europa League third qualifying round	0–1	0–1		1–0
5	AEL	6	0	1	5	3	10	−7	1	Qualification for the Europa League second qualifying round	0–1	0–0	0–2	

Source: Super League Greece and Worldfootball.net
Legend: Blue = home team win; Yellow = draw; Red = away team win.
Rules for classification: 1) points; 2) head-to-head points; 3) head-to-head goal difference; 4) head-to-head goals scored; 5) goal difference; 6) number of goals scored.

== Statistics ==
=== Top scorers ===
Rank	Player	Club	Goals
1	(Argentina) Ismael Blanco	AEK Athens	14
1	(Argentina) Luciano Galletti	Olympiacos	14
3	(Greece) Dimitris Salpingidis	Panathinaikos	10
4	(Brazil) Leonardo	Levadiakos	9
4	(Poland) Maciej Żurawski	AEL	9
6	(Croatia) Danijel Cesarec	Asteras Tripolis	8
6	(Nigeria) Patrick Ogunsoto	Ergotelis	8
6	(Croatia) Zdravko Popović	OFI	8
6	(Algeria) Rafik Djebbour	AEK Athens	8
10	(Ivory Coast) Ibrahima Bakayoko	PAOK	7
10	(Portugal) Edinho	AEK Athens	7
10	(Uruguay) Fabián Estoyanoff	Panionios	7
10	(Argentina) Lucio Filomeno	Asteras Tripolis	7
10	(Ghana) Bennard Kumordzi	Panionios	7
10	(Bosnia and Herzegovina) Zlatan Muslimović	PAOK	7
10	(Senegal) Dame N'Doye	OFI	7

Source: galanissportsdata.com

=== Most valuable players (excluding goalkeepers) ===
Position	Player	Club	Index
1	(Argentina) Luciano Galletti	Olympiacos	0.250
2	(Brazil) Dudu Cearense	Olympiacos	0.242
3	(Argentina) Fernando Belluschi	Olympiacos	0.217
4	(Uruguay) Fabián Estoyanoff	Panionios	0.215
5	(Serbia) Vladimir Ivić	PAOK	0.201
6	(Argentina) Diego Romano	Ergotelis	0.197
7	(Greece) Dimitris Salpingidis	Panathinaikos	0.196
8	(Brazil) Leonardo	Levadiakos	0.192
9	(Ivory Coast) Serge Dié	Iraklis	0.188
10	(Senegal) Dame N'Doye	OFI	0.183

Source: galanissportsdata.com

== Awards ==
=== MVP and Best Goal Awards ===
Matchday	MVP	Best Goal	Ref
1st			
2nd			
3rd			
4th			
5th			
6th	(Slovakia) Jozef Kožlej (Thrasyvoulos)	(Brazil) Anderson Gonzaga (Panionios)	
7th	(Greece) Dimitris Salpingidis (Panathinaikos)	(Spain) Javito (Aris)	
8th	(Brazil) Gabriel (Panathinaikos)	(Algeria) Rafik Djebbour (AEK Athens)	
9th	(Portugal) Sérgio Conceição (PAOK)	(Nigeria) Patrick Ogunsoto (Ergotelis)	
10th	(Germany) Denis Epstein (Iraklis)	(Spain) Koke (Aris)	
11th	(Argentina) Fernando Belluschi (Olympiacos)	(Brazil) Dudu Cearense (Olympiacos)	
12th	(Montenegro) Srđan Blažić (Levadiakos)	(Greece) Fanouris Goundoulakis (Panionios)	
13th	(Brazil) Gilberto Silva (Panathinaikos)	(Greece) Dimitrios Souanis (Skoda Xanthi)	
14th	(Greece) Giorgos Karagounis (Panathinaikos)	(Portugal) Edinho (AEK Athens)	
15th	(Uruguay) Fabián Estoyanoff (Panionios)	(Argentina) Sebastián Leto (Olympiacos)	
16th	(Greece) Achilleas Angelopoulos (Panthrakikos)	(Bosnia and Herzegovina) Zlatan Muslimović (PAOK)	
17th	(Greece) Dimitris Salpingidis (Panathinaikos)	(Argentina) Luciano Galletti (Olympiacos)	
18th	(Greece) Sotiris Ninis (Panathinaikos)	(Croatia) Zdravko Popović (OFI)	
19th	(Argentina) Ignacio Scocco (AEK Athens)		
20th	(Greece) Antonis Nikopolidis (Olympiacos)	(Argentina) Luciano Galletti (Olympiacos)	
21st	(Greece) Loukas Vyntra (Panathinaikos)	(Greece) Manolis Papasterianos (Iraklis)	
22nd	(Greece) Anastasios Papazoglou (Panserraikos)	(Greece) Panagiotis Tachtsidis (AEK Athens)	
23rd	(Greece) Spyros Vrontaras (Panthrakikos)	(Greece) Vasilios Koutsianikoulis (Ergotelis)	
24th	(Ivory Coast) Ibrahima Bakayoko (PAOK)	(Portugal) Edinho (AEK Athens)	
25th	(Greece) Lazaros Christodoulopoulos (Panathinaikos)	(Greece) Dimitris Salpingidis (Panathinaikos)	
26th	(Argentina) Fernando Belluschi (Olympiacos)	(Nigeria) Victor Agali (Skoda Xanthi)	
27th	(Argentina) Ignacio Scocco (AEK Athens)	(Greece) Stelios Sfakianakis (OFI)	
28th	(Greece) Georgios Georgiadis (Panserraikos)	(Portugal) Sérgio Conceição (PAOK)	
29th	(Brazil) Neto (Aris)	(Serbia) Vladimir Ivić (PAOK)	
30th	(Turkey) Tümer Metin (AEL)	(Greece) Xenofon Gittas (Panthrakikos)	

=== Annual awards ===
Annual awards were announced on 9 November 2009.

Award	Winner	Club
Greek Player of the Season	(Greece) Dimitris Salpingidis	Panathinaikos
Foreign Player of the Season	(Argentina) Luciano Galletti	Olympiacos
Young Player of the Season	(Greece) Vasilios Koutsianikoulis	Ergotelis
Goalkeeper of the Season	(Greece) Antonis Nikopolidis	Olympiacos
Golden Boot	(Argentina) Luciano Galletti (Argentina) Ismael Blanco	Olympiacos; AEK Athens
Manager of the Season	(Portugal) Fernando Santos	PAOK

== Attendances ==
Olympiacos drew the highest average home attendance in the 2008–09 edition of the Super League Greece.

#	Team	Average attendance
1	Olympiacos	25,368
2	Panathinaikos	19,242
3	PAOK	16,308
4	AEK Athens	15,704
5	Aris	11,402
6	Iraklis	5,263
7	Panserraikos	4,010
8	AEL	3,629
9	Panthrakikos	3,492
10	OFI	2,934
11	Asteras Tripolis	2,746
12	Panionios	2,681
13	Ergotelis	2,466
14	Skoda Xanthi	2,289
15	Levadiakos	2,189
16	Thrasyvoulos	826
