= Patrick Phungwayo =

South African soccer player

Personal information
- Full name: Patrick Thulani Phungwayo
- Date of birth: 6 January 1988 (age 38)
- Place of birth: Alexandra, South Africa
- Height: 1.73 m (5 ft 8 in)
- Position: Left back

Youth career
- Orlando Pirates
- Africa Sports Academy

Senior career*
Years	Team	Apps	(Gls)
2008–2012	Bidvest Wits	85	(0)
2010	→ Panionios (loan)	3	(0)
2012–2017	Orlando Pirates	56	(0)
2017–2019	Free State Stars	43	(0)
- * Club domestic league appearances and goals as of 14:29, 16 May 2020 (UTC)

Patrick Phungwayo (born 6 January 1988) is a South African soccer player who last played as a left-back for Free State Stars in the Premier Soccer League.

== Club career ==
=== Orlando Pirates ===
He joined Orlando Pirates on 26 June 2012. In May 2017, he was arrested after seven days on the run, eventually handing himself in, and charged with assault and attempted murder. He and his brother were later released on R2000 bail. He featured for Orlando Pirates in the Carling Black Label Cup at the start of the following season but was released by the club on 29 August 2017 after mutual agreement was reached for the termination of his contract.
