= Georgios Barkoglou =

Greek footballer (born 1978)

Personal information
- Full name: Georgios Barkoglou
- Date of birth: 8 July 1978 (age 48)
- Place of birth: Athens, Greece
- Height: 1.81 m (5 ft 11 1/2 in)
- Position: Midfielder

Senior career*
| Years | Team | Apps | (Gls) |
| 1994–1996 | Haidari | 34 | (0) |
| 1996–1998 | Panelefsiniakos | 18 | (0) |
| 1998–2000 | Panetolikos | 60 | (19) |
| 2000–2002 | Aris | 30 | (2) |
| 2002–2003 | Akratitos | 24 | (4) |
| 2003–2005 | Egaleo | 59 | (23) |
| 2006–2007 | Xanthi | 35 | (9) |
| 2008 | Apollon Kalamarias | 12 | (6) |
| 2008–2009 | Panionios | 20 | (2) |
| 2009–2011 | Levadiakos | 58 | (22) |
| 2011–2013 | Kerkyra | 33 | (4) |
| 2013–2014 | Apollon Smyrnis | 26 | (3) |
| 2014 | Nea Ionia | | |

Managerial career
- 2024–2025: Egaleo
- * Club domestic league appearances and goals as of 17 August 2013

Georgios "Giorgos" Barkoglou (Greek: Γεώργιος "Γιώργος" Μπάρκογλου; born 8 July 1978) is a Greek football manager and former midfielder.

== Career ==
On 29 September 2013 as a member of Super League Greece club Apollon Smyrnis, Barkoglou scored a goal against Levadiakos F.C. in a 4–2 victory, marking him as the first player to score with nine different Super League Greece teams.

Barkoglou accepted a job offer on 25 July 2024, to become the general manager at Super League Greece 2 club Egaleo, a club he previously played at from 2003 to 2005.
