= Giannis Simosis =

Greek-Australian footballer

Personal information
- Full name: Ioannis Simosis
- Date of birth: 13 March 1991 (age 35)
- Place of birth: Evia, Greece
- Height: 1.84 m (6 ft 0 in)
- Position: Striker

Senior career*
Years	Team	Apps	(Gls)
2009–2010	Panionios	4	(0)
2010–2012	Panthrakikos	28	(2)
2012	Adelaide Olympic	3	(1)
2012–2013	Kerkyra	7	(0)
2013	Wacker Burghausen	5	(0)
2013–2014	Anagennisi Karditsa	7	(0)
2014–2015	Panargiakos	0	(0)
2015	Ialysos	1	(0)
2015–2018	Aiolikos	11	(8)
2016	Adelaide Olympic	8	(1)
2017	West Adelaide	2	(0)
2018–2019	Fostiras	14	(4)
2019–2022	Adelaide Olympic	54	(11)
2023–	Tamynaikos Aliveriou		
- * Club domestic league appearances and goals as of 6 August 2023

Giannis Simosis (Greek: Γιάννης Σίμωσης; born 13 March 1991) is a Greek footballer who most recently played for Adelaide Olympic as a striker.
