= Suleiman Omo =

Nigerian footballer

Suleimon Omo
Personal information
- Full name: Suleimon Akeem Omo
- Date of birth: 15 December 1985 (age 40)
- Place of birth: Kwara, Nigeria
- Height: 1.85 m (6 ft 1 in)
- Position: Defensive midfielder

Youth career
- 1998–2003: Lagos State

Senior career*
Years	Team	Apps	(Gls)
2003–2004	Mogren	15	(0)
2004–2005	Pobeda Prilep	26	(0)
2005–2008	Egaleo	41	(1)
2008–2009	Ilisiakos	27	(1)
2009–2013	Panionios	62	(4)
2014	Tyrnavos	22	(0)
2014–2015	Ermionida	30	(3)
2015	Kerkyra	9	(0)
2015–2016	Acharnaikos	14	(0)
2016–2018	Lamia	52	(6)
2018–2019	Levadiakos	15	(0)
2020	Panserraikos		
2021–2022	Proodeftiki		
- * Club domestic league appearances and goals as of 15 June 2019

Sulaimon Akeem Omolade (born 15 December 1985) is a Nigerian professional footballer who plays as a defensive midfielder.

== Career ==
Omo previously played with Montenegrin club FK Mogren in the Second League of FR Yugoslavia, Macedonian First League club FK Pobeda and Greek clubs Egaleo, Ilisiakos, Panionios, Tyrnavos.
