= Christos Maniatis =

Greek footballer (born 1991)

Personal information
- Full name: Christos Maniatis
- Date of birth: 6 May 1991 (age 35)
- Place of birth: Keratsini, Greece
- Position: Right back

Youth career
- –2009: Panionios

Senior career*
Years	Team	Apps	(Gls)
2009–2010	Panionios	1	(0)
2009	Egaleo		
2010–2011	Keravnos Keratea	3	(0)
2011–2012	Paniliakos	10	(0)
2012–	Thrasyvoulos		
- * Club domestic league appearances and goals

Christos Maniatis (Greek: Χρήστος Μανιάτης; born 5 June 1991) is a Greek footballer who plays for Thrasyvoulos in the Football League (Greece) as a right back.

== Career ==
Christos Maniatis has previously played for Panionios, Egaleo, Keravnos Keratea F.C. and Paniliakos . He is the younger brother of Olympiacos player Ioannis Maniatis.
