= Davor Kukec =

Croatian footballer

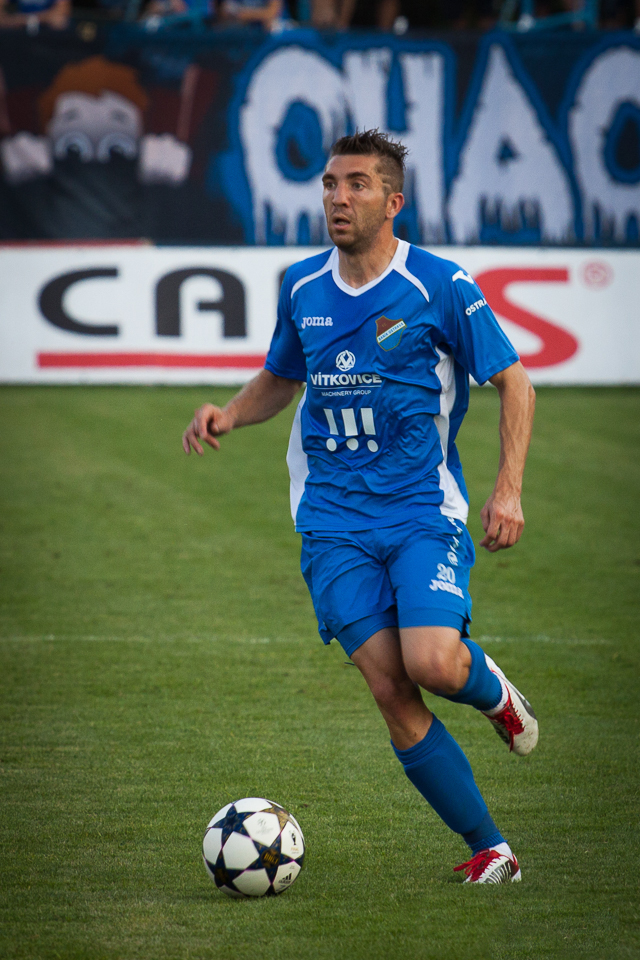

Personal information
- Full name: Davor Kukec
- Date of birth: 16 March 1986 (age 40)
- Place of birth: Zagreb, SFR Yugoslavia
- Height: 1.77 m (5 ft 9 1/2 in)
- Position: Midfielder

Team information
- Current team: ASKÖ Oedt
- Number: 8

Senior career*
Years	Team	Apps	(Gls)
2004–2008	Inter Zaprešić	60	(13)
2009–2011	Panionios	33	(2)
2012–2016	Baník Ostrava	105	(20)
2016–2017	Teplice	16	(1)
2017–2018	Příbram	8	(0)
2018–2020	Šibenik	54	(20)
2020-	ASKÖ Oedt	11	(0)

International career
	Croatia U21	8	(0)
- * Club domestic league appearances and goals as of 29 April 2018

Davor Kukec (born 16 March 1986) is a Croatian professional footballer who plays as a midfielder for Austrian club ASKÖ Oedt.

== Honours ==
Šibenik

- Croatian Second League: 2019–20
