= Georgios Tzavellas =

Greek footballer

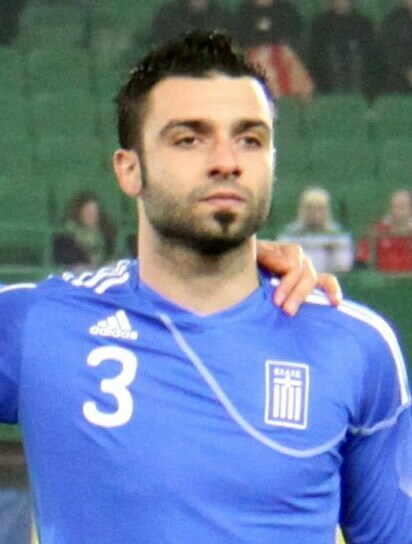
- Tzavellas with Greece in 2010

Personal information
- Full name: Georgios Tzavellas
- Date of birth: 26 November 1987 (age 38)
- Place of birth: Athens, Greece
- Height: 1.83 m (6 ft 0 in)
- Positions: Centre-back; left-back

Youth career
- 1992–2006: Doxa Vyronas

Senior career*
Years	Team	Apps	(Gls)
2006–2008	Kerkyra	23	(2)
2008–2010	Panionios	45	(2)
2010–2012	Eintracht Frankfurt	27	(1)
2012–2013	Monaco	38	(3)
2013–2017	PAOK	78	(5)
2017–2021	Alanyaspor	124	(5)
2021–2023	AEK Athens	41	(2)
2023	Pendikspor	1	(0)
2023–2024	Atromitos	23	(1)
Total		400	(21)

International career^{‡}
2010–2023	Greece	50	(3)
- * Club domestic league appearances and goals as of 20 June 2024 ‡ National team caps and goals as of 17 November 2023 (UTC)

Georgios Tzavellas (Greek: Γεώργιος Τζαβέλλας; born 26 November 1987) is a Greek former professional footballer who played as a centre-back or a left-back.

== Club career ==
=== Kerkyra ===
Tzavellas began his professional career with Kerkyra in a home match against Larissa (0–0).In Kerkyra played in 23 games (two goals) before signed for Panionios in January 2008.

=== Panionios ===
After signing for Panionios, Tzavellas was given the number 31. He made his debut on 13 September 2008 in the 0–1 away win versus Panserraikos. He scored his first goal on 7 December 2008 in the 45th minute in the 1–1 draw with Larissa. In his first full season, Tzavellas went on to make 17 appearances, scoring two goals. The 2009–10 season began brightly for Tzavellas as he cemented his place in the squad. In his second season with Panionios, he made a total of 24 appearances, starting all 24, but not scoring.

=== Eintracht Frankfurt ===
On 3 June 2010, the left back signed a three-year contract with Eintracht Frankfurt, which spent €1.2 million to sign him. He soon became a member of Eintracht's starting eleven. On 12 March 2011, Tzavellas scored his first Bundesliga goal during an away match against Schalke. He managed to beat German international goalkeeper Manuel Neuer with an effort from 73 meters, setting a new record for the longest distance a Bundesliga goal was ever scored from.

During the Bundesliga match against Werder Bremen on 8 April 2011, Tzavellas suffered a partial rupture of the cruciate ligament in his left knee. He missed the remainder of the 2010–11 season. Eintracht were relegated to 2. Bundesliga at the end of the season.

During summer 2011, Bundesliga new-boys Augsburg were reported to want the Greece defender, who was under contract until 2013, to strengthen their squad ahead of what promised to be a difficult season. At the same time, Tzavellas was rumoured to want to leave Eintracht Frankfurt following their relegation from the top flight. However, his agent, Paul Koutsoliakos, stated: "There is simply no truth in this." Eintracht Frankfurt general manager Bruno Hübner added: "We would refuse to accept any loan arrangements in this respect as something like this would just postpone a permanent transfer for the player. We would be in the same situation in 12 months."

=== Monaco ===
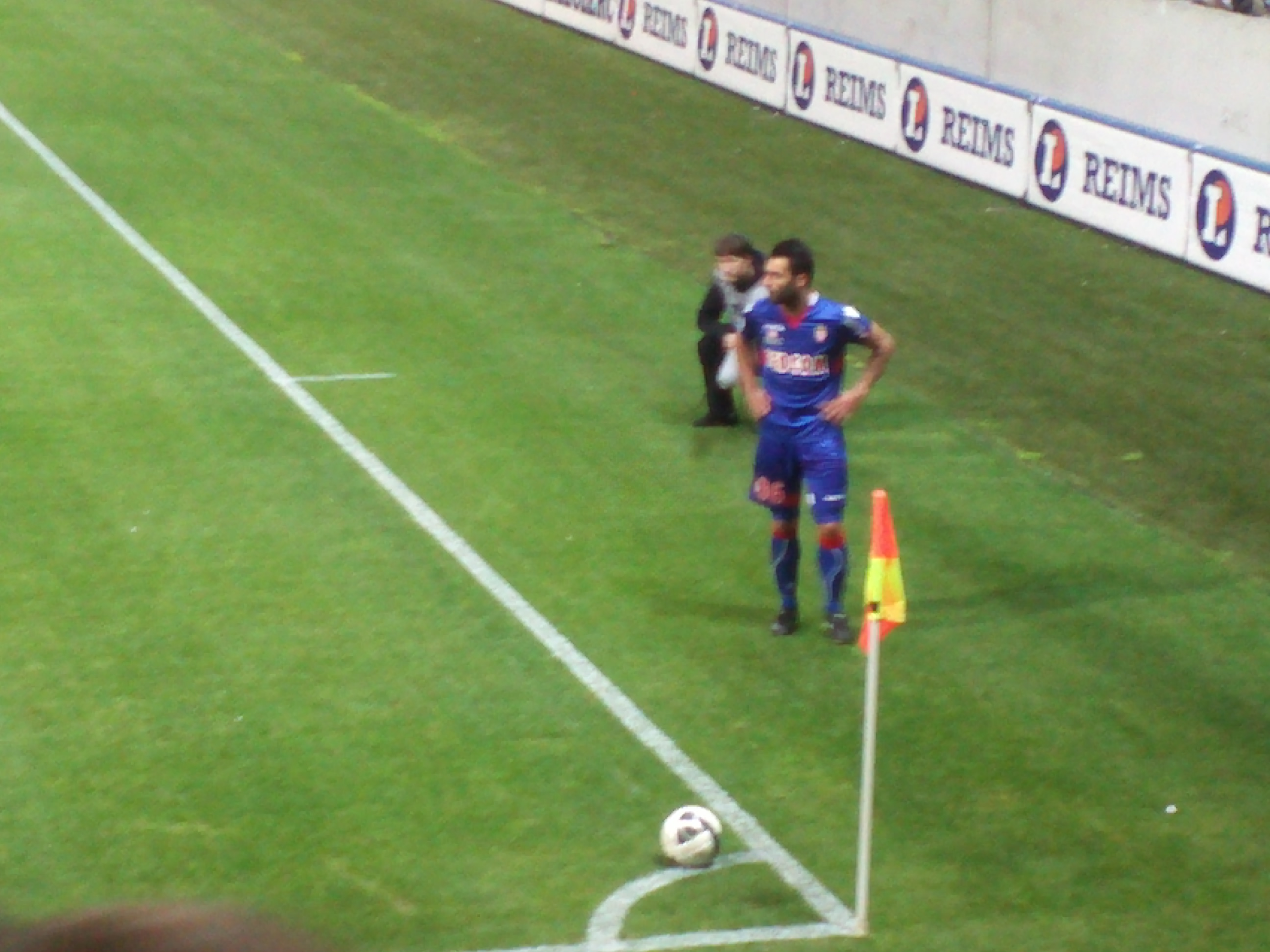
Tzavellas with Monaco in 2010

An injury to his left knee towards the end of the 2010–11 season, put the knockout and the relegation of the team, substantially accelerated its consignment of borrowing to Monaco at the end of next season. On 31 January 2012, it was announced that Tzavellas would leave Eintracht Frankfurt and join Ligue 2 outfit Monaco with immediate effect. Under the guidance of Claudio Ranieri, the Greek international left-back, helped the Monegasque escalate in Ligue 1, scoring twice in 24 appearances during their promotion season, but French Football News understands that AS Monaco's left back Giorgos Tzavellas is in advanced negotiations with PAOK after being considered as 'dead wood' by Monaco manager. It is also the towering hurdle set by the Russian team owner, Dmitry Rybolovlev and very expensive signings made, essentially paved the way for the repatriation and the agreement with PAOK. The left back who has spent two seasons with the club is understood to have agreed to move to the club but Monaco and PAOK are currently in negotiations regarding the fee.

=== PAOK ===
On 2 September 2013, he signed a four years' contract with PAOK and made his club debut on 14 September 2013 against Veria.He scored his first goal with the club in a 1–1 away draw against Atromitos. On 19 September 2013, he made his first ever appearance in UEFA competitions in a 2–1 home victory against FC Shakhter Karagandy.

After six months in PAOK and his commitment by scoring the winning goal to the victory against the Greek giant Olympiacos, he believes that "this time, there has nothing to envy from Monaco and it made me very positive impression! We have an excellent administrative and organization of football, the club operates on a purely European standards and the most important is that the administrative leader has the vision to reach the high score! As a player I can say that I do not miss anything of what I had in Montecarlo! I believe in the team all the conditions required to look up ..."

He scored twice in his first season with the club, but undoubtedly the most important was the winning goal, on 9 March 2014, against the champions Olympiacos. In January 2015, Deportivo La Coruna were in advanced talks to sign Tzavellas from PAOK but the deal will not go through. The negotiations did not pay off for the loan of the Greek left back to Deportivo and as long as the deal could not be reached consequently the transfer falls through. At the moment Tzavellas remains a PAOK player but his situation is still wide open as the transfer window has not closed yet.

On mid-March 2015, official PAOK informed Tzavellas that he can now return to training with the first team, since for over a month the 27-year-old defender was talking part in the practices of the U20 squad of the team, due to a quarrel with Angelos Anastasiadis the ex-coach of PAOK.

He started the 2015–16 season as a main left-back and in contrary to last year's season considers that the treatment from Igor Tudor is different, something that was confirmed in his quarrel with his old teammate Facundo Pereyra in preparation. Incidentally, Tzavellas is among the best players of PAOK until now, refuting those who said that he could not be a member of the club. On 18 October 2015, Tzavellas scored his first Super League goal with PAOK for the 2015–16 season against Iraklis in a 3–3 away draw. On 7 February 2016, in an episodic derby Super League away match against rivals Olympiakos, Tzavellas and Luka Milivojević were involved in an incident, which was ended with an unsportsmanlike conduct by Olympiakos' Serbian midfielder, resulting to leave the field for some time because he was bleeding. Eventually he was expelled at the second half due to a second yellow card, leaving his club with 10 players. It was his 7th red card in his career, but the 1st that his club did not win despite his absence. On 17 April 2016, in the last matchday of the 2015–16 season in an away game against Platanias, Tzavellas reached 100 appearances with the club in all competitions. On 25 August 2016, in the play off's second leg of UEFA Europa League against Dinamo Tsibili he scored his first international goal after Facundo Pereyra's corner with the head, sealing a 2–0 home win.

On 13 September 2016, Tzavellas extended his contract with PAOK until summer of 2020 with better financial terms. He started the 2016–17 season as an indisputable key player of club's defence. On 29 November 2016, after a disappointing home loss from Atromitos, the captain of PAOK will be training with the U-21 squad because of disciplinary issues. The administration of the club has informed him, that he will be "relegated" to U-21, something that had also happened in the recent past, during 2014–15 season and under Angelos Anastasiadis' managerial spell with PAOK. On 16 January 2017, Tzavellas fell out as PAOK have been trying to release him for free. The two parties agreed over a compensation and PAOK officially announced that Tzavellas has been released from the club.

=== Alanyaspor ===
The 29-year-old international defender after he terminated his contract with PAOK, came close to Cypriot club APOEL, but the transfer is not completed due to economic differences. Eventually on 21 January 2017, signed a 2,5 seasons' contract with Turkish side Alanyaspor. His contract, which ran until 2019, was worth €2 million plus bonuses. On 28 January 2016, he made his debut with the club in a 2–1 Süper Lig away loss match against Antalyaspor. On 1 April 2017, he scored his first goal with the club, sealing a 3–1 home win against Kasımpaşa On 10 February 2019, he scored with a head kick at the end of the first half after an assist from Djalma Campos, in a 3–2 away loss against rivals Göztepe On 3 December 2019, he opened the score after an assist from Salih Uçan in a hammering 5–1 home Cup win game against Adanaspor. On 18 January 2020, he scored with a right wing, his first goal for the 2019–20 Süper Lig season, as he opened the score after a Steven Caulker's assist in a hammering 5–1 home win game against Kayserispor. On 3 February 2021, he scored with a right footed shot his first goal for the 2020–21 season in an away 1–1 draw against Kayserispor.

=== AEK Athens ===
Giorgos Tzavellas will sign to AEK Athens on a two-year contract, after the release clause was paid to his former club Alanyaspor, and the only thing left is for the Greek club to officially announce the transfer of the international defender. On 30 June 2021, he was officially announced by the club. On 23 January 2022, he scored his first goal with the club in a 2–0 away win against Atromitos.

=== Pendikspor ===
Giorgos Tzavellas signed for free to Pendikspor from AEK Athens on July 1.

=== Atromitos ===
Giorgos Tzavellas signed for free to Atromitos on September 11, 2023.

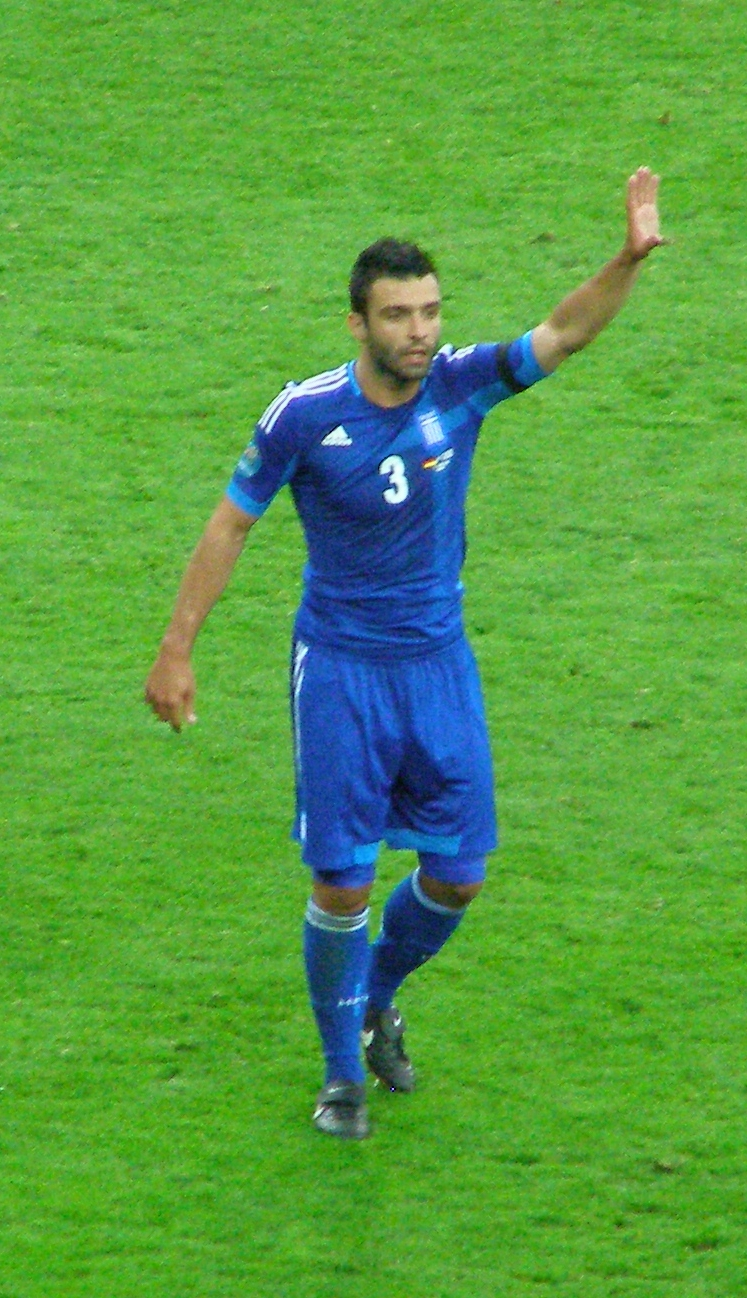
Georgios Tzavellas

== International career ==
=== Greece ===
After his impressive performances for Panionios, Tzavellas was called up to the national team on 15 November 2009 by Otto Rehhagel to face Ukraine in the second leg of the 2010 FIFA World Cup qualification playoffs. He did not feature in this game. On 11 May 2010, Tzavellas was named in Rehhagel's 30 man provisional World Cup squad for the 2010 World Cup, but was not selected for the final 23-man squad.

He made his international debut in a Euro 2012 qualifier against Croatia on 7 September 2010. Tzavellas was named to the 23-man squad for UEFA Euro 2012.

Tzavellas' season year with PAOK was his passport not only to be called from Greek national manager Fernando Santos to the 30 man provisional World Cup squad, but also to the final 23-man squad for 2014 World Cup.

On 7 October 2016, Tzavellas will miss the next three to four weeks due to knee injury. Tzavellas picked a knee injury during Greece's 2–0 win over Cyprus and he underwent scans to learn the extent of his injury. On 12 November 2016, at the Karaiskakis Stadium, Tzavellas scored, at the 95th minute against Bosnia and Herzegovina giving a valuable point to Greece, in his effort to qualify to the 2018 World Cup.

On 17 November 2023, Tzavellas announced his retirement from the Greek national team.

== Career statistics ==
=== Club ===
Club performance			League		Cup		Continental		Total	
Season	Club	League	Apps	Goals	Apps	Goals	Apps	Goals	Apps	Goals
Greece			League		Greek Cup		Europe		Total	
2006–07	Kerkyra	Super League Greece	13	1	0	0	0	0	13	1
2007–08	Kerkyra	Beta Ethniki	10	1	0	0	0	0	10	1
2008–09	Panionios	Super League Greece	18	2	2	0	0	0	20	2
2009–10	Panionios	Super League Greece	27	0	2	0	0	0	29	0
Germany			League		DFB-Pokal		Europe		Total	
2010–11	Eintracht Frankfurt	Bundesliga	25	1	3	1	0	0	28	2
2011–12	Eintracht Frankfurt	2. Bundesliga	2	0	0	0	0	0	2	0
France			League		Coupe de France		Europe		Total	
2011–12	Monaco	Ligue 2	14	1	0	0	0	0	14	1
2012–13	Monaco	Ligue 2	24	2	3	0	0	0	27	2
Greece			League		Greek Cup		Europe		Total	
2013–14	PAOK	Super League Greece	24	2	8	0	4	0	36	2
2014–15	PAOK	Super League Greece	19	1	0	0	4	0	23	1
2015–16	PAOK	Super League Greece	30	2	5	0	10	0	45	2
2016–17	PAOK	Super League Greece	5	0	0	0	4	1	9	1
Turkey			League		Turkish Cup		Europe		Total	
2016–17	Alanyaspor	Süper Lig	15	1	0	0	0	0	15	1
2017–18	Alanyaspor	Süper Lig	29	0	1	0	0	0	30	0
2018–19	Alanyaspor	Süper Lig	27	1	3	0	0	0	30	1
2019–20	Alanyaspor	Süper Lig	18	1	9	2	0	0	27	3
2020–21	Alanyaspor	Süper Lig	35	2	2	0	1	0	38	2
Greece			League		Greek Cup		Europe		Total	
2021–22	AEK	Super League Greece	28	2	3	0	2	0	33	2
2022–23	AEK	Super League Greece	13	0	5	0	0	0	18	0
2023–24	Pendikspor	Süper Lig	1	0	0	0	0	0	1	0
2023–24	Atromitos F.C.	Super League Greece	23	1	0	0	0	0	23	1
Career Total			400	21	46	3	25	1	471	25

Last updated: 18:00, 10 June 2024 (UTC).

=== International ===
National team	Year	Apps	Goals
Greece	2010	3	0
Greece	2011	2	0
Greece	2012	3	0
Greece	2013	3	0
Greece	2014	2	0
Greece	2015	2	0
Greece	2016	7	2
Greece	2017	6	0
Greece	2018	3	0
Greece	2020	5	0
Greece	2021	9	1
Greece	2022	3	0
Greece	2023	2	0
Total		50	3

Last updated: 3 June 2021

Scores and results list Greece's goal tally first.

#	Date	Venue	Opponent	Score	Result	Competition
1	24 March 2016	Karaiskakis Stadium, Pireaus, Greece	Montenegro	1–0	2–1	Friendly
2	13 November 2016	Karaiskakis Stadium, Pireaus, Greece	Bosnia and Herzegovina	1–1	1–1	2018 FIFA World Cup qualification
3	3 June 2021	King Baudouin Stadium, Brussels, Belgium	Belgium	1–1	1–1	Friendly

== Honours ==
AEK Athens

- Super League: 2022–23
- Greek Cup: 2022–23

Individual

- PAOK Player of the Season: 2015–16
- Super League Greece Team of the Season: 2015–16
