= Martin Latka =

Czech professional footballer (born 1984)

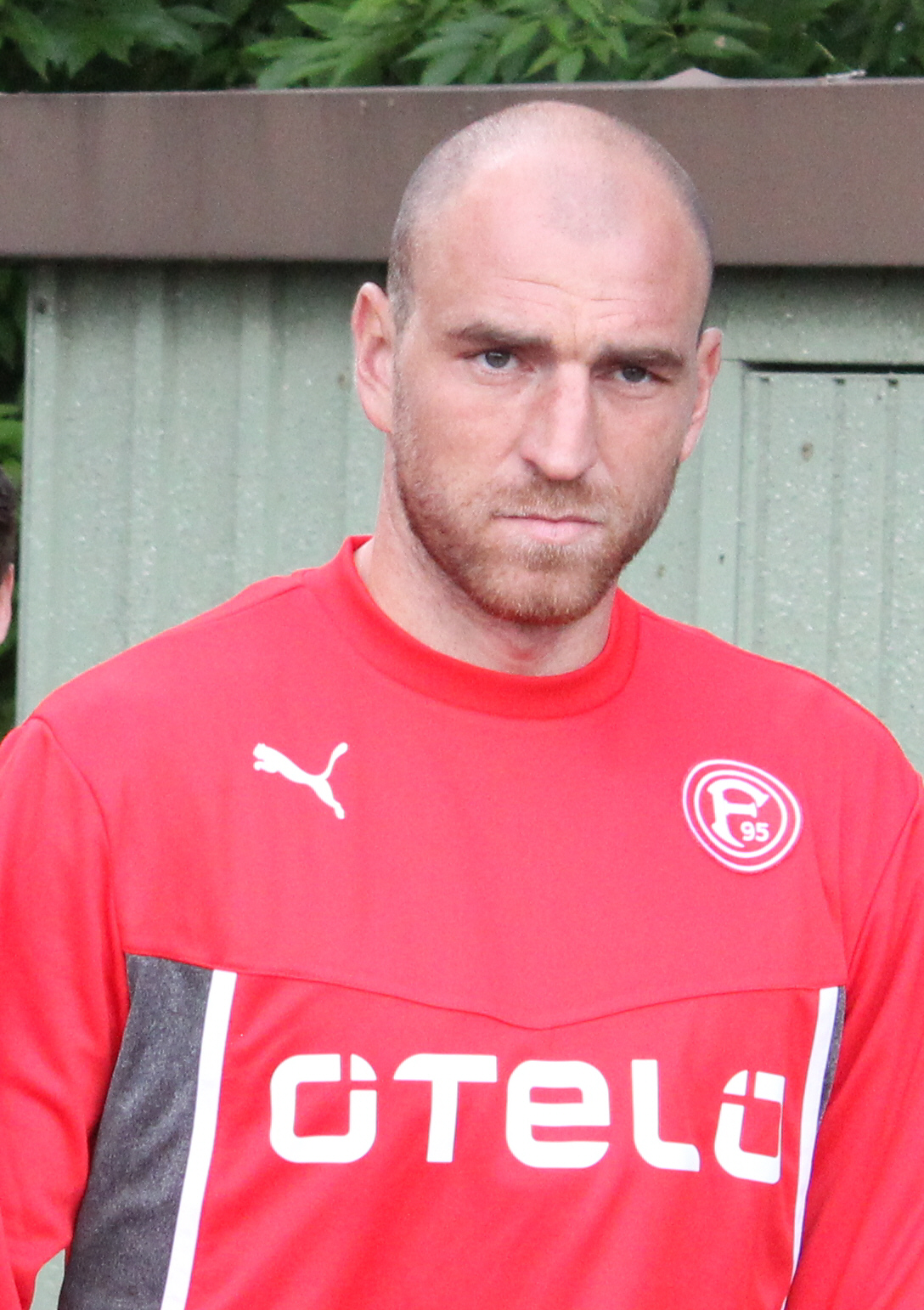

Personal information
- Full name: Martin Latka
- Date of birth: 28 September 1984 (age 42)
- Place of birth: Hluboká nad Vltavou, Czechoslovakia
- Height: 1.93 m (6 ft 4 in)
- Position: Defender

Youth career
- 1990–1992: Tatran Hluboká nad Vltavou
- 1992–2002: Dynamo České Budějovice

Senior career*
Years	Team	Apps	(Gls)
2002–2003	Dynamo České Budějovice	2	(3)
2003–2008	Slavia Prague	102	(8)
2006	→ Birmingham City (loan)	6	(0)
2009–2011	Panionios	45	(3)
2011–2013	Slavia Prague	33	(4)
2013–2014	Fortuna Düsseldorf	30	(2)
2014–2016	Slavia Prague	32	(2)
2016–2017	Slovan Liberec	10	(0)

International career
2004–2007	Czech Republic U21	25	(1)
2012	Czech Republic	1	(0)
- * Club domestic league appearances and goals

Martin Latka (born 28 September 1984) is a Czech former professional footballer who played as a central defender. During the course of his career, Latka played nine seasons for Slavia Prague. His other clubs included Dynamo České Budějovice and Slovan Liberec domestically, as well as English side Birmingham City, Greek club Panionios, and German club Fortuna Düsseldorf. Latka appeared once for the Czech Republic.

== Club career ==
Latka began his career with SK Dynamo České Budějovice, joining Slavia Prague in 2003. In 2005, he won the Talent of the Year award at the Czech Footballer of the Year awards. On 30 January 2006, he joined Birmingham City on loan until the end of the 2006–07 season, having spent time trialling with Middlesbrough. He made his debut for Birmingham City in a 1–1 draw against Liverpool at the start of February. He played six full games. However, in that season Birmingham were relegated and Latka returned to Slavia.

In January 2009, Latka joined Panionios. In 2011, he returned to Slavia Prague.

In January 2013, Latka was transferred to Bundesliga side Fortuna Düsseldorf, signing a one-and-a-half-year contract with the German club. After one-year-and-a-half at Fortuna Düsseldorf, his contract was not extended in May 2014 and he returned to SK Slavia Prague, but started just 13 matches in the 2015–16 season before leaving in summer 2016. In August 2016 Latka signed a one-year contract with Slovan Liberec. Latka announced his retirement from professional football in January 2018.

== International career ==
Although Latka won the Czech Talent of the Year award in 2005 and was a regular in Czech U21 setup, he was not called up to the senior national team until his debut against Slovakia on 14 November 2012.
