= Fabián Estoyanoff =

Uruguayan footballer (born 1982)

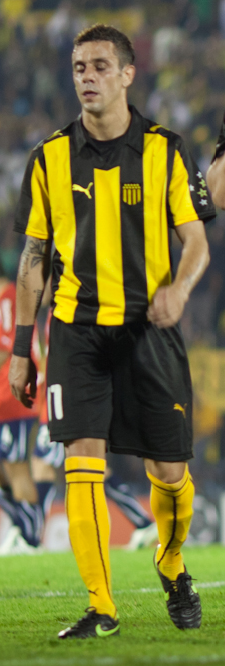
- Estoyanoff playing for Peñarol in 2011

Personal information
- Full name: Fabián Larry Estoyanoff Poggio
- Date of birth: 27 September 1982 (age 44)
- Place of birth: Montevideo, Uruguay
- Height: 1.73 m (5 ft 8 in)
- Position: Winger

Team information
- Current team: Fénix (sporting director)

Senior career*
Years	Team	Apps	(Gls)
2000–2005	Fénix	77	(16)
2002–2003	→ Peñarol (loan)	45	(15)
2005–2008	Valencia	0	(0)
2005–2006	→ Cádiz (loan)	29	(2)
2006–2007	→ Deportivo La Coruña (loan)	28	(1)
2007	→ Valladolid (loan)	4	(0)
2008	→ Peñarol (loan)	11	(4)
2008–2012	Panionios	37	(9)
2010–2011	→ Peñarol (loan)	22	(3)
2012–2015	Peñarol	60	(20)
2015	Al-Nassr	14	(4)
2016–2017	Fénix	30	(15)
2017–2021	Peñarol	86	(7)
2021–2024	Fénix	75	(7)
Total		518	(103)

International career
2001–2007	Uruguay	30	(4)
- * Club domestic league appearances and goals

Fabián Larry Estoyanoff Poggio (born 27 September 1982) is a Uruguayan former professional footballer who played as a winger. He is the current sporting director of Uruguayan Primera División club Fénix.

== Club career ==
Born in Montevideo, Estoyanoff started his career at Centro Atlético Fénix in 2000, and was loaned to Peñarol two years later. In 2005 he signed a five-year contract with Valencia CF in Spain, but never represented the club during his tenure, which included several loan spells.

Estoyanoff made his La Liga debut in the 2005–06 season, appearing regularly as Cádiz CF were relegated. The following campaign, he also featured consistently for Deportivo de La Coruña (although mainly as a substitute), scoring the game's only goal in a start against RCD Mallorca at home, through a penalty.

Valencia loaned Estoyanoff again for 2007–08, and he started out with Real Valladolid, where a lack of playing time prompted another loan, with a return to Uruguay and Peñarol in January 2008. There, he once again teamed up with Carlos Bueno; he played in Spain as a non-foreigner, having received an Italian passport.

Estoyanoff was finally released by Valencia in June 2008, eventually agreeing on a move to Panionios FC, having a successful first season in the Super League Greece. In 2010, the 28-year-old re-joined former side Peñarol on loan, and the move was made permanent the following year.

In January 2015, Estoyanoff signed for Al-Nassr FC in the Saudi Professional League. On 5 May, after his team had suffered a 1–3 home loss to Lekhwiya SC in the AFC Champions League, he attacked opposing player Nam Tae-hee from behind in the tunnel, being subsequently fined in 50% of his salary.

After retiring in December 2024 aged 42, Estoyanoff – who had five spells at Peñarol, winning four Primera División championships and finishing second in the 2011 Copa Libertadores – worked as director of football to his last club Fénix.

== International career ==
Estoyanoff made his debut for Uruguay on 25 July 2001 in that year's Copa América, playing the final 15 minutes in a 2–1 semi-final defeat against Mexico. Subsequently, he appeared at the 2004 – scoring twice for the eventual third-placed nation– and 2007 continental tournaments.

== Personal life ==
Estoyanoff's grandfather, Dimitar Stoyanov, was a Bulgarian stock breeder from the Sofia Valley who emigrated to Uruguay during the Balkan Wars (1912–13).

== Career statistics ==
=== International ===
Appearances and goals by national team and year
National team	Year	Apps	Goals
Uruguay	2001	2	0
Uruguay	2002	0	0
Uruguay	2003	7	1
Uruguay	2004	5	2
Uruguay	2005	6	0
Uruguay	2006	7	1
Uruguay	2007	3	0
Total		30	4

Scores and results list Uruguay's goal tally first, score column indicates score after each Estoyanoff goal.

List of international goals scored by Fabián Estoyanoff
No.	Date	Venue	Opponent	Score	Result	Competition
1	4 February 2003	Hong Kong Stadium, Hong Kong, Hong Kong	Iran	1–1	1–1	Friendly
2	13 July 2004	Estadio Miguel Grau, Piura, Peru	Argentina	2–2	4–2	2004 Copa América
3	24 July 2004	Estadio Garcilaso, Cusco, Peru	Colombia	1–0	2–1	2004 Copa América
4	21 May 2006	Giants Stadium, East Rutherford, United States	Northern Ireland	1–0	1–0	Friendly
