= Bennard Yao Kumordzi =

Ghanaian professional footballer (born 1985)

Bennard Kumordzi
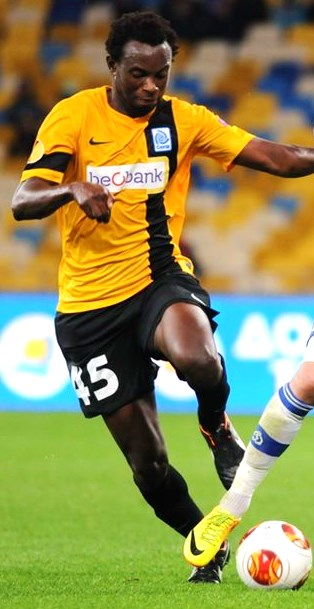
- Kumordzi in 2013

Personal information
- Full name: Bennard Yao Kumordzi
- Date of birth: 21 March 1985 (age 41)
- Place of birth: Accra, Greater Accra, Ghana
- Height: 1.88 m (6 ft 2 in)
- Position: Midfielder

Youth career
- Klagon Youth Academy
- Supreme FC

Senior career*
| Years | Team | Apps | (Gls) |
| 2005 | FC Norrköping | 11 | (17) |
| 2005–2006 | IFK Norrköping | 9 | (2) |
| 2006–2007 | Egaleo | 21 | (5) |
| 2007–2012 | Panionios | 117 | (16) |
| 2012 | Dijon | 16 | (1) |
| 2012–2017 | Genk | 90 | (8) |
| 2017–2019 | KV Kortrijk | 49 | (2) |
| Total | | 313 | (51) |

International career
| 2007–2011 | Ghana | 8 | (1) |
- * Club domestic league appearances and goals

Bennard Yao Kumordzi (born 21 March 1985) is a Ghanaian former professional footballer who played as a midfielder. He mostly played for Panionios and more recently Genk and Kortijk.

== Club career ==
=== Early career in Ghana and Sweden ===
Kumordzi started his career playing street football at Klagon FC Youth before signing for lower-league side Supreme FC. After playing three league matches in the 3rd Division he trialled with a number of clubs in Europe, finally joining a Swedish amateur club called FC Norrköping. During a cup match in July 2005 between FCN amateurs and IK Sleipner, a Second Division club, Kumordzi performed magnificently to win the match for his amateur club. Stefan Hellberg, the then-coach of Swedish Superettan side IFK Norrköping, who was at the game, told journalists that he had just discovered a gem. He gave him a trial with his club and Kumordzi jumped six tiers in the football league pyramid from the sixth Division amateurs to the Superettan. However, he never became a regular starter in the team. His stay there was ended after Kumordzi going on a strike on contractual disputes with his former club FC Norrköping.

=== Greece ===
During the strike he had gone to Greece to practice with Greek Super League side Egaleo. He signed a five-year contract with the Greek outfit.

In January 2007, the Hellenic Football Federation awarded Kumordzi the Most Valuable Player award for the first half of the 2006–07 Super League Greece season.

Among clubs scouting Kumordzi was German Bundesliga side Bayer 04 Leverkusen.

His excellent performances were the reason that he gained a transfer to a bigger club. He signed a contract with Panionios on 23 May 2007.

=== France and Dijon ===
His performances in the Greek Super League earned Kumordzi a move to Ligue 1 club Dijon FCO in January 2012 .

== International career ==
On 20 January 2007, Kumordzi was called up by Ghana's Olympic Team known as the Black Meteors for the 2008 Olympic Games Qualifier against Burkina Faso Olympic Team. He also played the two-legged tie of the 2007 All-African Games qualifying match against Nigeria U-23, which Ghana won.

On his 22nd Birthday, Kumordzi received his first senior call up for Ghana, as a direct injury replacement for captain Stephen Appiah for Ghana's international friendlies against Austria and Brazil on 24 and 27 March 2007. His international debut was against Brazil on 27 March 2007 at the Råsunda Stadium, Stockholm, Sweden when Ghana lost 1–0.

He scored his first goal for Ghana against Iran 28 June 2007, at the Azadi Stadium in Tehran.

== Style of play ==
In 2005, Swedish newspaper Folkbladet compared Kumordzi to Nigeria international Nwankwo Kanu. Kumordzi stated he admired Patrick Vieira who played for Arsenal.

== Honours ==
Genk

- Belgian Cup: 2012–13
