= Fanouris Goundoulakis =

Greek footballer and scout

Personal information
- Full name: Fanourios Goundoulakis
- Date of birth: 13 July 1983 (age 43)
- Place of birth: Loutraki, Greece
- Height: 1.81 m (5 ft 11 1/2 in)
- Position: Midfielder

Youth career
- 2000–2001: Loutraki '93

Senior career*
Years	Team	Apps	(Gls)
2001–2004	Kalamata	55	(9)
2004–2013	Panionios	224	(25)
2013–2017	Platanias	81	(9)
2017–2018	Doxa Drama	22	(4)
2018–2019	Egaleo		

International career
2003–2005	Greece U21	15	(1)
2004	Greece Olympic	0	(0)
- * Club domestic league appearances and goals as of 8 July 2018

Fanouris Goundoulakis (Greek: Φανούρης Γουνδουλάκης; born 13 July 1983) is a Greek former professional footballer who played as a midfielder. He is one of the very few Greek footballers who has a song dedicated to him.

== Career ==
Goundoulakis started playing professional football in 2000–01 at Kalamata F.C.In January 2004 he was transferred to Panionios and immediately got the basic position in the first team squad. He was a key member of the team during seasons (2006–07 and 2007–08) when they finished fifth in the championship with coach Ewald Lienen and participated in UEFA Cup and Intertoto Cup. It may not have frequent contact with the nets, but was especially dear to a purple platform because of militancy. In 2007, in an away match of the UEFA Cup group, achieved an amazing goal on Helsingborgs (score: 1–1), which is still remembered by fans of the club. He spent 9 years with the club, before he signed with Platanias. On 26 April 2016, Platanias officially announced the extension of experienced attacking midfielder' contract until the end of next season.

== Honours ==
Egaleo

- Gamma Ethniki: 2018–19
