= 2009–10 AEK Athens F.C. season =

AEK Athens
2009–10 season
- Chairman: Nikos Thanopoulos (until 14 March); Stavros Adamidis
- Manager: Dušan Bajević
- Stadium: Athens Olympic Stadium
- Super League: 3rd (After play-offs); 4th (Regular season)
- Greek Cup: Round of 32
- UEFA Europa League: Group stage
- Top goalscorer: League: Ignacio Scocco; Ismael Blanco (9 each); All: Ismael Blanco (13)
- Highest home attendance: 34,553 (vs Olympiacos) (23 September 2009)
- Lowest home attendance: 5,086 (vs PAS Giannina) (24 January 2010)
- Average home league attendance: 13,136
- Biggest win: AEK Athens 3–0 Vaslui; AEK Athens 4–0 Kavala
- Biggest defeat: Everton 4–0 AEK Athens
Home colours	Away colours	Third colours

The 2009–10 season was the 86th season in the existence of AEK Athens F.C. and the 51st consecutive season in the top flight of Greek football. They competed in the Super League, the Greek Cup and the UEFA Europa League. The season began on 20 August 2009 and finished on 19 May 2010.

== Kits ==
Supplier: Puma
Sponsor(s): Diners Club

Home	Away	Third

== Overview ==
AEK started to weaken competitively, while there were still in the midst of administrative crisis. In the summer of 2009, Sotirios Kyrgiakos left for Liverpool, while Edinho, Jürgen Macho, Përparim Hetemaj and Vasilios Pliatsikas departed as well. The big competitive problem of the club was Dušan Bajević, who had bad relations with many of his players and recommended to the management a series of failed signings. Among the players who came, Sanel Jahić, Carlos Araujo, Grigoris Makos, Roger Guerreiro, Leonardo and Nikolaos Karabelas stood out. The club sold a total of 17,350 season tickets.

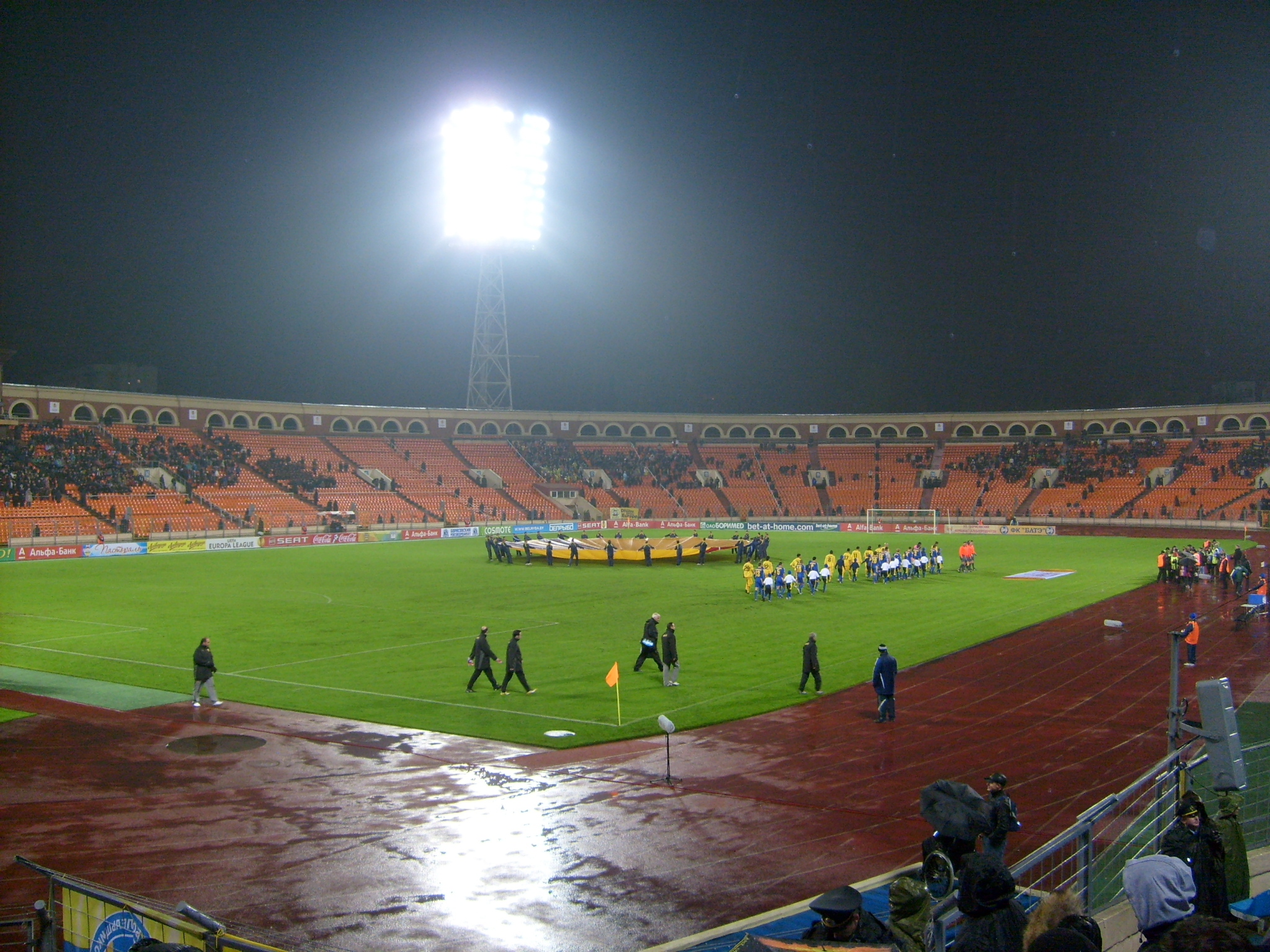
BATE and AEK Athens' players in Dinamo Stadium, Minsk (2009-10-22)

For the qualifiers of the Europa League, AEK faced the Romanian Vaslui. On 20 August at the Municipal Vaslui, AEK started by controlling the tempo, but did not dominate and ended the half trailing with 1–0. Afterwards they increased their tempo and equalized, but the issues in their transition cost them, as Vaslui scored in the final minutes to make the final 2–1. In the second leg at the Olympic Stadium the Romanians played defensively in order to keep the qualifying score, but when AEK opened the score in the second half, the visitors were forced to stop defending massively and play out in front. From that moment on, the task of Ignacio Scocco was easy, who with 2 beautiful goals formed the emphatic 3–0, giving AEK the ticket to the group stage, which ensured the necessary financial income for the club to keep up for the season. There, AEK were placed in the Group I, with Benfica, Everton and BATE Borisov, where they failed to advance to the continuation of the tournament, finishing third with a record of 1 win, 1 draw and 4 losses.

AEK faltered competitively throughout the season, but they short of saved things up in the second round. The only notable moments during the championship were the two wins at Toumba Stadium and Karaiskakis Stadium in matches that were indifferent for the team. In the cup, AEK experienced yet another disgraceful elimination, this time by Thrasyvoulos with 1–0. The end of the regular season found AEK in fourth place, far behind their competitors.

In the play-offs, AEK were out of first place from early on and just managed to put Olympiacos out of the European competintions in the last matchday, while they also moved up one place in the overall standings, finishing third. The players who managed to stood out in the season were the Argentines, Blanco, Scocco and Saja, as well as Majstorović, Kafes and Manduca.

== Management team ==
Position	Staff
Manager	(Bosnia and Herzegovina) Dušan Bajević
Assistant manager	(Greece) Lysandros Georgamlis
Goalkeeping coach	(Serbia) Slobodan Šujica
Fitness coach	(Cyprus) Antonis Kezos
Fitness coach	(Greece) Dimitris Bouroutzikas
Academy director	(North Macedonia) Toni Savevski
Academy manager	(Albania) Bledar Kola
U20 Manager	(Greece) Daniel Batista
U17 Manager	(Greece) Charis Kopitsis
Head of Scouting	(Greece) Vasilios Borbokis
Head of Medical	(Greece) Lakis Nikolaou

== Players ==
=== Squad information ===
NOTE: The players are the ones that have been announced by the AEK Athens' press release. No edits should be made unless a player arrival or exit is announced. Updated 19 May 2010, 23:59 UTC+3.

No.	Player	Nat.	Position(s)	Date of birth (Age)	Signed	Previous club	Transfer fee	Contract until
Goalkeepers
22	Giannis Arabatzis	(Greece)	GK	28 May 1984 (aged 26)	2002	(Greece) Enosi Apostolou Pavlou	€22,000	2011
23	Sebastián Saja	(Argentina)	GK	5 June 1979 (aged 31)	2008	(Argentina) San Lorenzo	Free	2012
27	Milan Lukač	(Serbia)	GK	4 October 1985 (aged 24)	2009	(Serbia) Čukarički	€300,000	2012
Defenders
2	Carlos Araujo	(Argentina) (Spain)	RB / RM	19 November 1981 (aged 28)	2009	(Argentina) Huracán	Free	2012
4	Geraldo Alves	(Portugal)	CB / RB	8 November 1980 (aged 29)	2007	(Portugal) Paços de Ferreira	€300,000	2010
5	Daniel Majstorović (Vice-captain 2)	(Sweden) (Serbia)	CB	5 April 1977 (aged 33)	2008	(Switzerland) Basel	Free	2011
6	Georgios Alexopoulos	(Greece)	CB / RB	7 February 1977 (aged 33)	2005	(Greece) Egaleo	Free	2010
12	Sanel Jahić	(Bosnia and Herzegovina) (France)	CB / RB / DM / LB	10 December 1981 (aged 28)	2009	(Greece) Aris	€590,000	2013
13	Dimitrios Koutromanos	(Greece)	RB / LB / DM	25 February 1987 (aged 23)	2009	(Greece) Panetolikos	€50,000	2011
15	Nikolaos Karabelas	(Greece)	LB / LM	20 December 1984 (aged 25)	2009	(Greece) Aris	Free	2013
24	Kostas Manolas	(Greece)	CB / RB	14 January 1991 (aged 19)	2009	(Greece) Thrasyvoulos	€50,000	2012
31	Nikolaos Georgeas (Vice-captain)	(Greece)	RB / LB / DM	27 December 1976 (aged 33)	2001	(Greece) Kalamata	€1,500,000	2011
87	Nicolás Bianchi Arce	(Argentina)	CB	29 January 1987 (aged 23)	2009	(Argentina) San Lorenzo	€300,000	2010
Midfielders
1	Pantelis Kafes (Captain)	(Greece)	CM / DM / AM / RM / LM	24 June 1978 (aged 32)	2007	(Greece) Olympiacos	Free	2012
3	Youssouf Hersi	(Netherlands) (Ethiopia)	RM / AM / CM / RW / LM / LW / SS	20 August 1982 (aged 27)	2009	(Netherlands) Twente	Free	2010
11	Gustavo Manduca	(Brazil)	RM / AM / RW / LM / LW / CM / SS / ST	8 June 1980 (aged 30)	2007	(Portugal) Benfica	€800,000	2010
14	Grigoris Makos	(Greece)	DM / CM / CB	18 January 1987 (aged 23)	2009	(Greece) Panionios	€860,000	2014
16	Roger Guerreiro	(Poland) (Brazil)	AM / CM / LM / LW / SS	25 May 1982 (aged 28)	2009	(Poland) Legia Warsaw	€250,000	2013
17	Antonis Rikka	(Greece) (France)	DM / CM	3 March 1986 (aged 24)	2008	(Greece) Skoda Xanthi	€600,000	2013
19	Panagiotis Lagos	(Greece)	LM / LW / LB / CM / DM	18 July 1985 (aged 24)	2006	(Greece) Iraklis	€900,000	2013
26	Seidu Yahaya	(Ghana)	DM / CM	31 December 1989 (aged 20)	2009	(Ghana) Tema Youth	€150,000	2011
34	Panagiotis Tachtsidis	(Greece)	CM / DM / AM	15 February 1991 (aged 19)	2007	(Greece) AEK Athens U20	—	2010
90	Savvas Gentsoglou	(Greece)	DM / CB / CM	19 September 1990 (aged 19)	2006	(Greece) AEK Athens U20	—	2014
Forwards
9	Leonardo	(Brazil)	LW / AM / LM / RW / RM / SS	22 September 1986 (aged 23)	2009	(Greece) Levadiakos	€700,000	2014
10	Rafik Djebbour	(Algeria) (France)	ST / SS / RW / LW	8 March 1984 (aged 26)	2008	(Greece) Panionios	€3,200,000	2011
18	Ismael Blanco	(Argentina)	ST / SS	19 January 1983 (aged 27)	2008	(Argentina) Colón	€850,000	2011
21	Michalis Pavlis	(Greece)	SS / ST / RW / LW	22 September 1989 (aged 20)	2006	(Greece) AEK Athens U20	—	2011
29	Krisztián Németh	(Hungary)	ST / SS / RW	5 January 1989 (aged 21)	2009	(England) Liverpool	Free	2010
32	Ignacio Scocco	(Argentina) (Italy)	SS / LW / AM / ST / LM / RW / RM	29 May 1985 (aged 25)	2008	(Mexico) UNAM	€1,500,000	2011
Left during Winter Transfer Window
28	Theodoros Moschonas	(Greece)	GK	3 December 1990 (aged 19)	2009	(Greece) AEK Athens U20	—	2011
7	Juanfran	(Spain)	LB / LM / CB	15 July 1976 (aged 33)	2008	(Spain) Real Zaragoza	Free	2010
8	Tam Nsaliwa (Vice-captain 4)	(Canada) (Germany)	DM / CM / CB	28 January 1982 (aged 28)	2007	(Greece) Panionios	€400,000	2010
30	Ilie Iordache	(Romania)	LW / RW / LM / RM / AM	23 March 1985 (aged 25)	2009	(Romania) Pandurii Târgu Jiu	Free	2012

== Transfers ==
=== In ===
==== Summer ====
No.	Pos.	Player	From	Fee	Date	Contract Until	Source
2	DF	(Argentina) Carlos Araujo	(Argentina) Huracán	Free transfer	18 August 2009	30 June 2012	
3	MF	(Netherlands) Youssouf Hersi	(Netherlands) Twente	Free transfer	30 August 2009	30 June 2010	
9	FW	(Brazil) Leonardo	(Greece) Levadiakos	€700,000	6 August 2009	30 June 2014	
12	DF	(Bosnia and Herzegovina) Sanel Jahić	(Greece) Aris	€590,000	31 August 2009	30 June 2013	
14	MF	(Greece) Grigoris Makos	(Greece) Panionios	€860,000^{[a]}	25 June 2009	30 June 2014	
15	DF	(Greece) Nikolaos Karabelas	(Greece) Aris	Free transfer	1 July 2009	30 June 2013	
16	MF	(Poland) Roger Guerreiro	(Poland) Legia Warsaw	€250,000	30 August 2009	30 June 2013	
24	DF	(Greece) Kostas Manolas	(Greece) Thrasyvoulos	€50,000	19 June 2009	30 June 2012	
26	MF	(Ghana) Seidu Yahaya	(Ghana) Tema Youth	€150,000	1 July 2009	30 June 2011	
27	GK	(Serbia) Milan Lukač	(Serbia) Čukarički	€300,000	1 July 2009	30 June 2012	
28	GK	(Greece) Theodoros Moschonas	(Greece) AEK Athens U20	Promotion	16 September 2009	30 June 2011	
30	FW	(Romania) Ilie Iordache	(Romania) Pandurii Târgu Jiu	Free transfer	1 July 2009	30 June 2012	
–	GK	(Italy) Stefano Sorrentino	(Italy) Chievo Verona	Loan return	1 July 2009	30 June 2010	
—	GK	(Greece) Giannis Fysekis	(Greece) Apollon Kalamarias	Loan return	1 July 2009	30 June 2010	
—	DF	(Greece) Nikos Barboudis	(Greece) Apollon Kalamarias	Loan return	1 July 2009	30 June 2010	
—	DF	(Greece) Xenofon Panos	(Greece) Nea Ionia	Loan return	1 July 2009	30 June 2010	
—	DF	(Greece) Andreas Chronis	(Greece) Nea Ionia	Loan return	1 July 2009	31 December 2010	
—	MF	(Greece) Georgios Paligeorgos	(Greece) Anagennisi Karditsa	Loan return	1 July 2009	30 June 2011	
—	MF	(Senegal) El Hadji Diouf	(Greece) Anagennisi Karditsa	Loan return	1 July 2009	30 June 2010	
—	MF	(Cyprus) Georgios Tofas	(Cyprus) Anorthosis Famagusta	Loan return	1 July 2009	30 June 2010	
—	MF	(Greece) Panagiotis Zorbas	(Greece) Panetolikos	Loan return	1 July 2009	30 June 2011	

==== Winter ====
No.	Pos.	Player	From	Fee	Date	Contract Until	Source
—	MF	(Greece) Nikolaos Kaltsas	(Greece) Chaidari	Loan termination	31 December 2009	30 June 2010	

=== Out ===
==== Summer ====
No.	Pos.	Player	To	Fee	Date	Source
9	FW	(Portugal) Edinho	(Spain) Málaga	€900,000^{[b]}	7 July 2009	
12	DF	(France) Olivier N'Siabamfumu	(Italy) Crotone	End of contract	10 July 2009	
16	MF	(Greece) Vasilios Pliatsikas	(Germany) Schalke 04	€300,000	30 June 2009	
24	MF	(Argentina) Agustín Pelletieri	(Argentina) Lanús	Loan return	30 June 2009	
25	DF	(Greece) Sotirios Kyrgiakos	(England) Liverpool	€3,000,000^{[c]}	20 August 2009	
56	MF	(Finland) Përparim Hetemaj	(Netherlands) Twente	Free transfer^{[d]}	30 August 2009	
77	GK	(Austria) Jürgen Macho	(Austria) LASK	End of contract	5 November 2009	
80	MF	(Senegal) El Hadji Diouf	(Portugal) Vitória de Setúbal	Contract termination	20 August 2009	
—	GK	(Italy) Stefano Sorrentino	(Italy) Chievo Verona	€600,000^{[e]}	15 July 2009	
—	GK	(Greece) Giannis Fysekis	(Greece) PAO Neon Epivaton	Contract termination	16 June 2009	
—	DF	(Greece) Nikos Barboudis	Free agent	Contract termination	20 August 2009	
—	DF	(Greece) Andreas Chronis	(Greece) Agia Paraskevi	Contract termintion	3 August 2009	
—	MF	(Greece) Nikolaos Kaltsas	(Greece) Kallithea	Contract termination	6 July 2009	
—	MF	(Cyprus) Georgios Tofas	(Cyprus) Anorthosis Famagusta	€80,000	29 May 2009	

=== Loan in ===
==== Summer ====
No.	Pos.	Player	From	Fee	Date	Until	Option to buy	Source
29	FW	(Hungary) Krisztián Németh	(England) Liverpool	Free	25 August 2009	30 June 2010	✗	
87	DF	(Argentina) Nicolás Arce	(Argentina) San Lorenzo	€300,000	8 September 2009	30 June 2010	✓	

=== Loan out ===
==== Summer ====
No.	Pos.	Player	To	Fee	Date	Until	Option to buy	Source
20	FW	(Australia) Nathan Burns	(Greece) Kerkyra	Free	27 August 2009	30 June 2010	✗	
—	DF	(Greece) Nikolaos Kourkoulas	(Greece) Nea Ionia	Free	30 June 2009	30 June 2010	✗	
—	MF	(Greece) Georgios Paligeorgos	(Greece) Thrasyvoulos	Free	11 October 2009	30 June 2011	✗	
—	MF	(Greece) Panagiotis Zorbas	(Greece) OFI	Free	30 June 2009	30 June 2011	✗	

==== Winter ====
No.	Pos.	Player	To	Fee	Date	Until	Option to buy	Source
28	GK	(Greece) Theodoros Moschonas	(Greece) Elpidoforos	Free	1 January 2010	30 June 2010	✗	
7	DF	(Spain) Juanfran	(Spain) Levante	Free	29 January 2010	30 June 2010	✗	
8	MF	(Canada) Tam Nsaliwa	(Norway) Lillestrøm	€30,000	24 March 2010	30 June 2010	✗	
30	FW	(Romania) Ilie Iordache	(Romania) Rapid București	Free	25 January 2010	30 June 2010	✗	

a. plus 25% of resale fee.
b. plus 40% of resale fee.
c. plus Krisztián Németh on one-year free loan.
d. plus Youssouf Hersi as an exchange and 20% of resale fee.
e. plus 20% of resale fee.

=== Contract renewals ===
No.	Pos.	Player	Date	Former Exp. Date	New Exp. Date	Source
1	MF	(Greece) Pantelis Kafes	12 June 2009	30 June 2009	30 June 2012	
19	MF	(Greece) Panagiotis Lagos	27 May 2010	30 June 2010	30 June 2013	
31	DF	(Greece) Nikolaos Georgeas	30 June 2010	30 June 2010	30 June 2011	
90	MF	(Greece) Savvas Gentsoglou	20 May 2010	30 June 2013	30 June 2014	

=== Overall transfer activity ===
==== Expenditure ====
Summer: ▼€3,200,000

Winter: ▼€0

Total: ▼€3,200,000

==== Income ====
Summer: ▲€4,880,000

Winter: ▲€30,000

Total: ▲€4,910,000

==== Net Totals ====
Summer: ▲€1,680,000

Winter: ▲€30,000

Total: ▲€1,710,000

== Pre-season and friendlies ==
21 July 2009 Friendly	AEK Athens	1–1	CFR Cluj	Seefeld
19:00 EEST (UTC+3)	Blanco 39'; Hetemaj (yellow card) 68'; Manolas (yellow card) 70'	Report	Cadú 60' (pen.)	Stadium: Seefeld Sports Arena

24 July 2009 Friendly	AEK Athens	2–2	Ankaragücü	Seefeld
19:00 EEST (UTC+3)	Kafes 2', 46'	Report	Eriş 15', (yellow card) 39'; Duruer 71'	Stadium: Seefeld Sports Arena
Note: The match ended at the 86th minute due to heavy rainfall.

27 July 2009 Friendly	AEK Athens	1–1	Chernomorets Burgas	Längenfeld
19:30 EEST (UTC+3)	Pavlis 62'; Nsaliwa (yellow card) 70'; Juanfran (yellow card) 89'	Report	Seitz (yellow card) 39'; Simeonov (yellow card) 54'; Morys 90+1'	Stadium: Jahnstadion Längenfeld

5 August 2009 Friendly	Panionios	0–1	AEK Athens	Nea Smyrni
19:00 EEST (UTC+3)		Report	Djebbour 42'; Karabelas (yellow card) 43'	Stadium: Nea Smyrni Stadium; Referee: Konstantinos Papastamatis (Athens)

8 August 2009 Friendly	AEK Athens	0–2	Boca Juniors	Marousi
21:00 EEST (UTC+3)		Report	Palermo 43'; Mouche 54'	Stadium: Olympic Stadium; Attendance: 14,090; Referee: Giorgos Stathopoulos (Achaea)

12 August 2009 Friendly	AEK Athens	1–3	Mallorca	Marousi
19:45 EEST (UTC+3)	Leonardo 24'; Rikka (yellow card) 88'	Report	Martí 49'; Aduriz 65'; Casadesús 90+1'	Stadium: Olympic Stadium; Attendance: 4,074; Referee: Giorgos Giannopoulos (Phthiotis)

9 September 2009 Friendly	Thrasyvoulos	0–2	AEK Athens	Fyli
20:00 EEST (UTC+3)		Report	Blanco 25'; Leonardo 58'	Stadium: Fyli Municipal Stadium

== Competitions ==
=== Overall record ===
Competition	First match	Last match	Starting round	Final position	Record							
Competition	First match	Last match	Starting round	Final position	Pld	W	D	L	GF	GA	GD	Win %
Super League	30 August 2009	18 April 2010	Matchday 1	4th	30	15	8	7	43	31	+12	50.00
Super League Play-offs	28 April 2010	19 May 2010	Matchday 1	3rd	6	2	2	2	8	7	+1	33.33
Greek Cup	29 October 2009	29 October 2009	Round of 32	Round of 32	1	0	0	1	0	1	−1	0.00
UEFA Europa League	20 August 2009	17 December 2009	Play-off round	Group stage	8	2	1	5	9	13	−4	25.00
Total					45	19	11	15	60	52	+8	42.22

Last updated: 19 May 2010
Source: Competitions

=== Super League Greece ===
==== Regular season ====
===== League table =====
Pos	Team	Pld	W	D	L	GF	GA	GD	Pts	Qualification or relegation
2	Olympiacos	30	19	7	4	47	18	+29	64	Qualification for the Play-offs
3	PAOK	30	19	5	6	41	16	+25	62	Qualification for the Play-offs
4	AEK Athens	30	15	8	7	43	31	+12	53	Qualification for the Play-offs
5	Aris	30	12	10	8	35	28	+7	46	Qualification for the Play-offs
6	Kavala	30	10	9	11	31	32	−1	39	

Source: Super League Greece
Rules for classification: 1) Points; 2) Head-to-head points; 3) Head-to-head goal difference; 4) Play-offs (neutral ground).
(Note: Criterion 4 is only used if needed to decide champion, teams for relegation or teams for UEFA competitions).

===== Results summary =====
Overall								Home						Away					
Pld	W	D	L	GF	GA	GD	Pts	W	D	L	GF	GA	GD	W	D	L	GF	GA	GD
30	15	8	7	43	31	+12	53	11	2	2	29	14	+15	4	6	5	14	17	−3

Last updated: 2010-04-18.
Source: Super League Greece

===== Results by Matchday =====
Round	1	2	3	4	5	6	7	8	9	10	11	12	13	14	15	16	17	18	19	20	21	22	23	24	25	26	27	28	29	30
Ground	H	A	H	A	H	A	H	A	A	H	A	H	A	H	A	A	H	A	H	A	H	A	H	H	A	H	A	H	A	H
Result	L	W	W	D	L	L	W	D	D	W	L	W	L	W	L	W	D	D	W	D	W	W	W	W	L	W	W	D	D	W
Position	12	8	4	4	7	10	8	7	7	5	7	7	8	5	8	5	6	6	6	5	4	4	4	4	4	4	4	4	4	4

Updated to match(es) played on 18 April 2010. Source: slgr.gr
A = Away; H = Home; W = Win; D = Draw; L = Loss; P = Postponed

===== Matches =====
23 September 2009 1	AEK Athens	1–2	Olympiacos	Marousi
21:15 EEST (UTC+3)	Makos (yellow card) 39'; Guerreiro (yellow card) 50'; Németh 65'; Jahić (yellow card) 88'	Report	Torosidis 43', 55'; Zairi (yellow card) 49'; Diogo (yellow card) 62'; Dudu (yellow card) 72'; Żewłakow (yellow card) 89'	Stadium: Olympic Stadium; Attendance: 34,553; Referee: Giorgos Daloukas (Thessaly); Man of the Match: Vasilis Torosidis

30 August 2009 2	Atromitos	0–1	AEK Athens	Peristeri
16:45 EEST (UTC+3)	Oliveira (yellow card) 21'; Nebegleras (yellow card) 26'	Report	Majstorović (yellow card) 21'; Németh (yellow card) 43'; Blanco 58'; Makos (yellow card) 62'; Saja (yellow card) 84'	Stadium: Peristeri Stadium; Attendance: 2,935; Referee: Dimitris Kyrkos (Epirus); Man of the Match: Krisztián Németh

13 September 2009 3	AEK Athens	1–0	Iraklis	Marousi
21:15 EEST (UTC+3)	Kafes 14', (yellow card) 27'; Blanco (penalty missed) 21'; Majstorović (yellow card) 41'; Scocco (yellow card) 52' (yellow-red card) 54'; Juanfran (yellow card) 77'	Report	Iacob (yellow card) 20'; Papazacharias (yellow card) 51' (yellow-red card) 82'; Papasterianos (yellow card) 56'	Stadium: Olympic Stadium; Attendance: 16,736; Referee: Michalis Dakos (Xanthi); Man of the Match: Pantelis Kafes

20 September 2009 4	PAS Giannina	1–1	AEK Athens	Ioannina
16:45 EEST (UTC+3)	Andralas (yellow card) 22'; Dimbala (yellow card) 79' (yellow-red card) 79'; Kontogoulidis 81', (yellow card) 90'; Sikalias (yellow card) 88'	Report	Guerreiro (yellow card) 20'; Jahić (yellow card) 47'; Németh 52'	Stadium: Zosimades Stadium; Attendance: 6,667; Referee: Dimitris Kalopoulos (Thessaloniki); Man of the Match: Krisztián Németh

27 September 2009 5	AEK Athens	0–1	Panathinaikos	Marousi
21:15 EEST (UTC+3)	Jahić (yellow card) 38'	Report	Leto (yellow card) 12'; Salpingidis 48', (yellow card) 60'	Stadium: Olympic Stadium; Attendance: 22,423; Referee: Michael Koukoulakis (Heraklion); Man of the Match: Dimitris Salpingidis

5 October 2009 6	Skoda Xanthi	1–0	AEK Athens	Xanthi
19:00 EEST (UTC+3)	Poy 21'; Quintana (yellow card) 58'; Vallas (yellow card) 73'	Report	Blanco (yellow card) 81'	Stadium: Skoda Xanthi Arena; Attendance: 2,597; Referee: Anastasios Kakos (Corfu); Man of the Match: Mauro Poy

18 October 2009 7	AEK Athens	3–2	Panthrakikos	Marousi
21:15 EEST (UTC+3)	Majstorović 28'; Scocco (yellow card) 38', (goal) 59'; Đokić 39' (o.g.)	Report	Buval 26'; Đokić (yellow card) 34'; Clément (yellow card) 53'; Bertrand 67', (yellow card) 70'	Stadium: Olympic Stadium; Attendance: 8,676; Referee: Giorgos Giannopoulos (Athens); Man of the Match: Ignacio Scocco

25 October 2009 8	Aris	1–1	AEK Athens	Thessaloniki
16:45 EET (UTC+2)	Abreu 5', (yellow card) 68'; Arano (yellow card) 33'; Fernández (yellow card) 54' (yellow-red card) 85'; Kouloucheris (yellow card) 72'; Nafti (yellow card) 87'	Report	Scocco (yellow card) 28', (goal) 48'; Jahić (yellow card) 34'; Kafes (yellow card) 68'; Makos (yellow card) 78'	Stadium: Kleanthis Vikelidis Stadium; Attendance: 14,770; Referee: Konstantinos Papastamatis (Athens); Man of the Match: Ignacio Scocco

1 November 2009 9	Ergotelis	2–2	AEK Athens	Heraklion
16:45 EET (UTC+2)	Roubakis (yellow card) 39'; Júnior (penalty missed) 43', (yellow card) 45'; Leal 51', 71'; Kordonouris (yellow card) 61'; Verpakovskis (yellow card) 79'; Fragoulakis (yellow card) 90+3'	Report	Manduca 21'; Blanco 84' (pen.); Jahić (yellow card) 63'	Stadium: Pankritio Stadium; Attendance: 2,299; Referee: Dimitris Kalopoulos (Thessaloniki); Man of the Match: Sergio Leal

9 November 2009 10	AEK Athens	3–1	AEL	Marousi
16:45 EET (UTC+2)	Majstorović 18'; Karabelas (yellow card) 24'; Blanco 50' (pen.); Németh 64', (yellow card) 83'	Report	Venetidis (yellow card) 44'; Romeu 45'; Boukouvalas (yellow card) 49'; Katsiaros (yellow card) 63'; Malarz (yellow card) 75'; Kyriakidis (yellow card) 90+1'	Stadium: Olympic Stadium; Attendance: 8,295; Referee: Vasilis Paboridis (Kilkis); Man of the Match: Gustavo Manduca

21 November 2009 11	Kavala	2–1	AEK Athens	Kavala
16:45 EET (UTC+2)	Dobrašinović 55' (pen.); Mendy (yellow card) 59'; Douglão (yellow card) 82'; Giannou 85'	Report	Karabelas (yellow card) 18'; Gentsoglou 68'; Kafes (yellow card) 82'	Stadium: Kavala Stadium; Attendance: 6,007; Referee: Stavros Tritsonis (Athens); Man of the Match: Siniša Dobrašinović

28 November 2009 12	AEK Athens	1–0	PAOK	Marousi
19:00 EET (UTC+2)	Makos (yellow card) 30'; Manduca 48'; Hersi (yellow card) 75'	Report	Ivić (yellow card) 40'; Vitolo (yellow card) 45'; N. Arabatzis (yellow card) 59'; Contreras (yellow card) 87'	Stadium: Olympic Stadium; Attendance: 15,942; Referee: Giorgos Stathopoulos (Achaia); Man of the Match: Ignacio Scocco

6 December 2009 13	Panionios	3–1	AEK Athens	Nea Smyrni
19:00 EET (UTC+2)	Maniatis 21'; Casteglione (yellow card) 52'; Riera 79'; Balaban 89'	Report	Leonardo 28'; Araujo (yellow card) 73'; Manduca (yellow card) 77'	Stadium: Nea Smyrni Stadium; Attendance: 4,568; Referee: Ilias Spathas (Piraeus); Man of the Match: Sito Riera

13 December 2009 14	AEK Athens	3–2	Levadiakos	Marousi
19:00 EET (UTC+2)	Tachtsidis 35'; Manduca 44', 57', (yellow card) 85'; Arabatzis (yellow card) 56'; Jahić (yellow card) 82'; Araujo (yellow card) 90+2'	Report	Barkoglou 45+1'; Agali 56', (yellow card) 82'; Taralidis (yellow card) 61'	Stadium: Olympic Stadium; Attendance: 6,940; Referee: Michalis Dakos (Xanthi); Man of the Match: Gustavo Manduca

20 December 2009 15	Asteras Tripolis	2–0	AEK Athens	Tripoli
16:45 EET (UTC+2)	Éder 10'; Fytanidis (yellow card) 25'; Cesarec (yellow card) 45+1', (goal) 49'; Argyropoulos (yellow card) 74'	Report	Jahić (yellow card) 73'	Stadium: Asteras Tripolis Stadium; Attendance: 1,792; Referee: Konstantinos Papastamatis (Athens); Man of the Match: Danijel Cesarec

6 January 2010 16	Olympiacos	1–2	AEK Athens	Piraeus
19:00 EET (UTC+2)	A. Papadopoulos 26'; Óscar (yellow card) 72'; Pantos (yellow card) 79'	Report	Jahić (yellow card) 4'; Scocco 33', 40'; Karabelas (yellow card) 38'; Alves (yellow card) 53'; Manduca (yellow card) 86'	Stadium: Karaiskakis Stadium; Attendance: 27,789; Referee: Dimitris Kalopoulos (Thessaloniki); Man of the Match: Ignacio Scocco

10 January 2010 17	AEK Athens	3–3	Atromitos	Marousi
19:00 EET (UTC+2)	Gentsoglou 12'; Scocco 45+1'; Blanco 53'; Makos (yellow card) 77'	Report	Nebegleras 9'; Brito (yellow card) 23'; Perrone 69', 71'; Apostolopoulos (yellow card) 87'; Favalli (yellow card) 90'; Sarmiento (yellow card) 90+6'	Stadium: Olympic Stadium; Attendance: 14,467; Referee: Marios Labropoulos (Elis); Man of the Match: Ignacio Scocco

16 January 2010 18	Iraklis	1–1	AEK Athens	Thessaloniki
19:00 EET (UTC+2)	Milano (yellow card) 25'; Kone 27', (yellow card) 35'; Katsabis (yellow card) 86'; Giannoulis (yellow card) 90'	Report	Djebbour (yellow card) 32', (goal) 55'; Georgeas (yellow card) 61'; Araujo (yellow card) 68' (yellow-red card) 90'; Alves (yellow card) 75'	Stadium: Kaftanzoglio Stadium; Attendance: 5,019; Referee: Michael Koukoulakis (Heraklion); Man of the Match: Rafik Djebbour

24 January 2010 19	AEK Athens	3–1	PAS Giannina	Marousi
19:00 EET (UTC+2)	Djebbour 23'; Kafes 71', 90+3', (yellow card) 72'	Report	Saitiotis 55'; Mendrinos (yellow card) 72'; Kousas (yellow card) 77'	Stadium: Olympic Stadium; Attendance: 5,086; Referee: Vasilis Paboridis (Kilkis); Man of the Match: Pantelis Kafes

31 January 2010 20	Panathinaikos	1–1	AEK Athens	Marousi
19:00 EET (UTC+2)	Sarriegi (yellow card) 24'; Salpingidis 27'; Vyntra (yellow card) 64'; Gilberto Silva (yellow card) 69'	Report	Scocco 9', (yellow card) 44'; Majstorović (yellow card) 24'; Jahić (yellow card) 49'	Stadium: Olympic Stadium; Attendance: 47,379; Referee: Giorgos Stathopoulos (Achaia); Man of the Match: Dimitris Salpingidis

7 February 2010 21	AEK Athens	3–1	Skoda Xanthi	Marousi
19:00 EET (UTC+2)	Blanco 17' (pen.), 79'; Alves (yellow card) 30'; Leonardo 45+1'; Georgeas (yellow card) 87'	Report	Buga 9'; Gspurning (yellow card) 16'; Al-Saify (yellow card) 34'; Vasilakakis (yellow card) 39'	Stadium: Olympic Stadium; Attendance: 7,036; Referee: Michael Koukoulakis (Heraklion); Man of the Match: Ismael Blanco

14 February 2010 22	Panthrakikos	1–2	AEK Athens	Komotini
16:45 EET (UTC+2)	Argyriou (yellow card) 29'; Goianira (yellow card) 41'; Beleck 56', (yellow card) 71'; Lopes (yellow card) 64'; Sakellariou (yellow card) 69'	Report	Scocco 11'; Makos (yellow card) 18'; Leonardo (yellow card) 41'; Hersi 47'; Majstorović (yellow card) 61'; Georgeas (yellow card) 61'; Lagos (yellow card) 67'	Stadium: Komotini Stadium; Attendance: 3,232; Referee: Petros Konstantineas (Messinia); Man of the Match: Ignacio Scocco

21 February 2010 23	AEK Athens	1–0	Aris	Marousi
16:45 EET (UTC+2)	Georgeas (yellow card) 11'; Jahić (yellow card) 26'; Kafes 46', (yellow card) 50'	Report	Nasuti (yellow card) 4'	Stadium: Olympic Stadium; Attendance: 18,294; Referee: Michalis Tsiniaris (Athens); Man of the Match: Pantelis Kafes

27 February 2010 24	AEK Athens	1–0	Ergotelis	Marousi
19:00 EET (UTC+2)	Djebbour 12'; Manduca (yellow card) 76'; Saja (yellow card) 90+2'; Kafes (yellow card) 90+5'	Report	Verpakovskis (yellow card) 4'; Geladaris (yellow card) 37'; Hieblinger (yellow card) 44'; Shashiashvili (yellow card) 90+4'	Stadium: Olympic Stadium; Attendance: 11,023; Referee: Michalis Dakos (Xanthi); Man of the Match: Rafik Djebbour

7 March 2010 25	AEL	1–0	AEK Athens	Larissa
19:00 EET (UTC+2)	Blažek (yellow card) 33', (goal) 55'; Dabizas (yellow card) 51'; Romeu (yellow card) 72'	Report	Araujo (yellow card) 14'; Jahić (yellow card) 44'; Scocco (yellow card) 59'; Karabelas (yellow card) 59'; Majstorović (yellow card) 82'	Stadium: Alkazar; Attendance: 4,540; Referee: Michalis Tsiniaris (Athens); Man of the Match: Jan Blažek

14 March 2010 26	AEK Athens	3–0	Kavala	Marousi
19:00 EET (UTC+2)	Blanco 34'; Jahić 50'; Djebbour (yellow card) 61'; Manduca 81'	Report	Oruma (yellow card) 24'; Moore (yellow card) 33'	Stadium: Olympic Stadium; Attendance: 9,347; Referee: Anastasios Sidiropoulos (Dodecanese); Man of the Match: Kostas Manolas

21 March 2010 27	PAOK	0–1	AEK Athens	Thessaloniki
19:00 EET (UTC+2)	N. Arabatzis (yellow card) 44'; Koutsianikoulis (yellow card) 45+1'	Report	Blanco 16', (yellow card) 36'; Jahić (yellow card) 20'; Gentsoglou (yellow card) 56'; Saja (yellow card) 73'; Scocco (yellow card) 83'	Stadium: Toumba Stadium; Attendance: 18,589; Referee: Anastasios Kakos (Corfu); Man of the Match: Ismael Blanco

28 March 2010 28	AEK Athens	1–1	Panionios	Marousi
19:00 EEST (UTC+3)	Jahić (yellow card) 45'; Scocco 90+3'; Manolas (yellow card) 87'	Report	Latka (yellow card) 26'; Goundoulakis 40', (yellow card) 63'; Riera (yellow card) 51'; Maniatis (yellow card) 89'; Cocalić (yellow card) 90'	Stadium: Olympic Stadium; Attendance: 14,098; Referee: Dimitris Kyrkos (Epirus); Man of the Match: Kostas Manolas

11 April 2010 29	Levadiakos	0–0	AEK Athens	Livadeia
19:00 EEST (UTC+3)	Begoña (yellow card) 8'; Abubakari (yellow card) 71'; Bushi (yellow card) 81'	Report	Manolas (yellow card) 44'; Djebbour (yellow card) 68'; Gentsoglou (yellow card) 88'	Stadium: Levadia Municipal Stadium; Attendance: 1,484; Referee: Anastasios Kakos (Corfu); Man of the Match: Javier Vallejo

18 April 2010 30	AEK Athens	2–0	Asteras Tripolis	Marousi
19:00 EEST (UTC+3)	Djebbour 48'; Kafes 90+1'	Report	Urribarri (yellow card) 50' (yellow-red card) 90+8'; Wilchez (yellow card) 90+4'	Stadium: Olympic Stadium; Attendance: 10,019; Referee: Apostolos Abarkiolis (Macedonia); Man of the Match: Kostas Manolas

==== Play-offs ====
===== Table =====
Pos	Team	Pld	W	D	L	GF	GA	GD	Pts	Qualification
2	PAOK	6	4	1	1	7	3	+4	16	Qualification for the Champions League third qualifying round
3	AEK Athens	6	2	2	2	8	7	+1	9	Qualification for the Europa League play-off round (Note: Since Aris lost the 2009–10 Greek Football Cup Final against Champions League-qualified Panathinaikos, all Europa League spots will be determined by the play-off group positions.)
4	Aris	6	2	2	2	8	9	−1	8 (Note: Head-to-head record: Aris–Olympiacos 2–0, Olympiacos–Aris 0–0.)	Qualification for the Europa League third qualifying round
5	Olympiacos	6	1	1	4	3	7	−4	8	Qualification for the Europa League second qualifying round

Source: Super League Greece: Standings and Schedule
Rules for classification: 1) points; 2) head-to-head points; 3) head-to-head goal difference; 4) head-to-head goals scored; 5) goal difference; 6) number of goals scored.

===== Results summary =====
Overall								Home						Away					
Pld	W	D	L	GF	GA	GD	Pts	W	D	L	GF	GA	GD	W	D	L	GF	GA	GD
6	2	2	2	8	7	+1	9	2	1	0	6	3	+3	0	1	2	2	4	−2

Last updated: 2010-05-19.
Source: Super League Greece

===== Results by Matchday =====
Round	1	2	3	4	5	6
Ground	H	A	H	A	A	H
Result	D	L	W	D	L	W
Position	5	5	4	4	4	3

Updated to match(es) played on 19 May 2010. Source: slgr.gr
A = Away; H = Home; W = Win; D = Draw; L = Loss; P = Postponed

===== Matches =====
28 April 2010 1	AEK Athens	0–0	PAOK	Marousi
16:45 EEST (UTC+3)	Araujo (yellow card) 72'	Report	Vitolo (yellow card) 35'	Stadium: Olympic Stadium; Attendance: 11,807; Referee: Michalis Dakos (Xanthi); Man of the Match: Kostas Manolas

2 May 2010 2	Olympiacos	2–1	AEK Athens	Piraeus
19:00 EEST (UTC+3)	Mellberg 10'; Żewłakow (yellow card) 21'; LuaLua (yellow card) 39'; Maresca 43', (yellow card) 71'; Dudu (yellow card) 75'; A. Papadopoulos (yellow card) 75'	Report	Araujo (yellow card) 13'; Djebbour 22' (pen.); Lagos (yellow card) 34'; Makos (yellow card) 64'; Kafes (yellow card) 81'; Georgeas (yellow card) 85'	Stadium: Karaiskakis Stadium; Attendance: 18,697; Referee: Stavros Tritsonis (Athens); Man of the Match: Enzo Maresca

9 May 2010 3	AEK Athens	4–2	Aris	Marousi
16:45 EEST (UTC+3)	Jahić (yellow card) 9' (yellow-red card) 36'; Djebbour 27'; Saja (red card) 53'; Leonardo 75', 84'; Scocco 76'; Majstorović (yellow card) 81'	Report	Calvo (yellow card) 30' (yellow-red card) 39'; Guiaro (yellow card) 51'; Cámpora 55' (pen.); Johnson 72'; Prittas (yellow card) 73'; Cámpora (red card) 80'; Nasuti (yellow card) 89'; Nafti (yellow card) 90+1'	Stadium: Olympic Stadium; Attendance: 6,961; Referee: Michael Koukoulakis (Heraklion); Man of the Match: Rafik Djebbour

12 May 2010 4	Aris	1–1	AEK Athens	Thessaloniki
19:00 EEST (UTC+3)	Prittas 47'; Kouloucheris (yellow card) 56'	Report	Makos (yellow card) 48'; Araujo (yellow card) 70'; Leonardo 90+3'	Stadium: Kleanthis Vikelidis Stadium; Attendance: 6,357; Referee: Anastasios Kakos (Corfu); Man of the Match: Leonardo

16 May 2010 5	PAOK	1–0	AEK Athens	Thessaloniki
21:15 EEST (UTC+3)	Cirillo (yellow card) 31'; Fotakis (yellow card) 32' (yellow-red card) 90+3'; Muslimović 51', (yellow card) 53'	Report	Georgeas (yellow card) 17'; Lagos (yellow card) 20'; Németh (yellow card) 22'; Scocco (penalty missed) 49'; Majstorović (yellow card) 81'	Stadium: Toumba Stadium; Attendance: 25,303; Referee: Michael Koukoulakis (Heraklion); Man of the Match: Zlatan Muslimović

19 May 2010 6	AEK Athens	2–1	Olympiacos	Marousi
21:15 EEST (UTC+3)	Manolas 6'; Blanco 54'; Manduca (yellow card) 56'; Németh (yellow card) 67'; Jahić (yellow card) 71'; Lagos (yellow card) 84'; Alexopoulos (yellow card) 90+3'	Report	Mitroglou (yellow card) 2'; G. Papadopoulos 10', (yellow card) 48'; Stoltidis (yellow card) 61'; Bravo (yellow card) 87'	Stadium: Olympic Stadium; Attendance: 14,738; Referee: Anastasios Kakos (Corfu); Man of the Match: Ismael Blanco

=== Greek Cup ===
AEK Athens entered the Greek Cup at the round of 32.

==== Matches ====
29 October 2009 Round of 32	Thrasyvoulos	1–0 (a.e.t.)	AEK Athens	Fyli
17:00 EET (UTC+2)	Doriva (yellow card) 21'; Paligeorgos (yellow card) 64'; Zapropoulos (yellow card) 81'; Karamalikis 105'	Report	Majstorović (yellow card) 3'; Georgeas (yellow card) 66'	Stadium: Fyli Municipal Stadium; Attendance: 350; Referee: Stavros Tritsonis (Athens)

=== UEFA Europa League ===
==== Play-off round ====
The draw for the play-off round was held on 7 August 2009.

20 August 2009 First leg	Vaslui (Romania)	2–1	(Greece) AEK Athens	Vaslui, Romania
21:00 EEST (UTC+3)	Wesley 29', 82' (pen.); Akakpo (yellow card) 34'; Zubar (yellow card) 50'	Report	Majstorović (yellow card) 49'; Georgeas (yellow card) 65'; Blanco 69' (pen.)	Stadium: Municipal Vaslui; Attendance: 9,000; Referee: Saïd Ennjimi (France); Man of the Match: Wesley

27 August 2009 Second leg	AEK Athens (Greece)	3–0 (4–2 agg.)	(Romania) Vaslui	Athens, Greece
21:00 EEST (UTC+3)	Araujo (yellow card) 41'; Manduca 59'; Majstorović (yellow card) 62'; Scocco 74', 79'	Report	Pavlović (yellow card) 45'; Ljubinković (yellow card) 77'	Stadium: Olympic Stadium; Attendance: 19,921; Referee: Damir Skomina (Slovenia); Man of the Match: Ignacio Scocco

==== Group stage ====
The draw for the group stage was held on 28 August 2009

Pos	Team	Pld	W	D	L	GF	GA	GD	Pts	Qualification	BEN	EVE	BTE	AEK
1	(Portugal) Benfica	6	5	0	1	13	3	+10	15	Advance to knockout phase	—	5–0	2–0	2–1
2	(England) Everton	6	3	0	3	7	9	−2	9	Advance to knockout phase	0–2	—	0–1	4–0
3	(Belarus) BATE Borisov	6	2	1	3	7	9	−2	7		1–2	1–2	—	2–1
4	(Greece) AEK Athens	6	1	1	4	5	11	−6	4		1–0	0–1	2–2	—

Source: Soccerway

===== Matches =====
17 September 2009 1	Everton (England)	4–0	(Greece) AEK Athens	Liverpool, England
22:05 EEST (UTC+3)	Yobo 10'; Distin 17'; Pienaar 37'; Cahill (yellow card) 42'; Jô 82'; Saha (red card) 90+2'	Report	Araujo (red card) 55'; Kafes (yellow card) 65'	Stadium: Goodison Park; Attendance: 26,747; Referee: Robert Małek (Poland); Man of the Match: Marouane Fellaini

1 October 2009 2	AEK Athens (Greece)	1–0	(Portugal) Benfica	Athens, Greece
20:00 EEST (UTC+3)	Georgeas (yellow card) 9' (yellow-red card) 86'; Majstorović 43'; Jahić (yellow card) 66'; Gentsoglou (yellow card) 87'	Report	Pereira (yellow card) 48'; Ramires (yellow card) 74'; Cardozo (yellow card) 87'	Stadium: Olympic Stadium; Attendance: 12,420; Referee: Stefan Johannesson (Sweden); Man of the Match: Sebastián Saja

22 October 2009 3	BATE Borisov (Belarus)	2–1	(Greece) AEK Athens	Minsk, Belarus
20:00 EEST (UTC+3)	Sosnovski (yellow card) 30'; Pawlaw 51'; Valadzko (yellow card) 61'; Goharyan (yellow card) 71'; Alumona 85'	Report	Blanco 31' (pen.); Majstorović (yellow card) 38' (yellow-red card) 52'; Kafes (yellow card) 80'; Manduca (yellow card) 86'; Arce (yellow card) 87' (yellow-red card) 90+1'	Stadium: Dinamo Stadium; Attendance: 9,200; Referee: Zsolt Szabó (Hungary); Man of the Match: Aleksandr Alumona

5 November 2009 4	AEK Athens (Greece)	2–2	(Belarus) BATE Borisov	Athens, Greece
22:05 EET (UTC+2)	Blanco 1'; Manduca 38'; Gentsoglou (yellow card) 49'; Yahaya (yellow card) 74'; Németh (yellow card) 90+1'	Report	Rodionov 17'; Volodko 26'; Yurevich (yellow card) 37'; Nyakhaychyk (yellow card) 40'; Shitov (yellow card) 52' (yellow-red card) 75'; Radzkow (yellow card) 81'; Pawlaw (yellow card) 90'	Stadium: Olympic Stadium; Attendance: 9,717; Referee: Alon Yefet (Israel); Man of the Match: Aleksandr Volodko

2 December 2009 5	AEK Athens (Greece)	0–1	(England) Everton	Athens, Greece
20:00 EET (UTC+2)	Alves (yellow card) 75'	Report	Bilyaletdinov 6', (yellow card) 67'; Hibbert (yellow card) 18'; Cahill (yellow card) 50'; Howard (yellow card) 56'; Baxter (yellow card) 88'	Stadium: Olympic Stadium; Attendance: 12,141; Referee: Claudio Circhetta (Switzerland); Man of the Match: Diniyar Bilyaletdinov

17 December 2009 6	Benfica (Portugal)	2–1	(Greece) AEK Athens	Lisbon, Portugal
22:05 EET (UTC+2)	Menezes (penalty missed) 14', (yellow card) 42'; Di María 45', 73'; Shaffer (yellow card) 75'; Martins (yellow card) 90+2'	Report	Araujo (yellow card) 14'; Blanco 84'; Alves (yellow card) 90+3'; Georgeas (yellow card) 90+4'	Stadium: Estádio da Luz; Attendance: 20,155; Referee: Gianluca Rocchi (Italy); Man of the Match: Ángel Di María

== Statistics ==
=== Squad statistics ===
As of 19 May 2010

No.	Pos	Player	Super League		Super League Play-offs		Greek Cup		Europa League		Total	
No.	Pos	Player	Apps	Goals	Apps	Goals	Apps	Goals	Apps	Goals	Apps	Goals
Goalkeepers
22	GK	(Greece) Giannis Arabatzis	8	0	2	0	0	0	0	0	10	0
23	GK	(Argentina) Sebastián Saja	22	0	5	0	1	0	7	0	35	0
27	GK	(Serbia) Milan Lukač	0	0	0	0	0	0	1	0	1	0
Defenders
2	DF	(Argentina) Carlos Araujo	26	0	4	0	1	0	3	0	34	0
4	DF	(Portugal) Geraldo Alves	13	0	0	0	0	0	5	0	18	0
5	DF	(Sweden) Daniel Majstorović	28	2	5	0	1	0	6	1	40	3
6	DF	(Greece) Georgios Alexopoulos	0	0	0	0	1	0	0	0	1	0
12	DF	(Bosnia and Herzegovina) Sanel Jahić	20	1	5	0	1	0	5	0	31	1
13	DF	(Greece) Dimitris Koutromanos	0	0	0	0	0	0	1	0	1	0
15	DF	(Greece) Nikolaos Karabelas	20	0	1	0	0	0	4	0	25	0
24	DF	(Greece) Kostas Manolas	5	0	5	1	0	0	0	0	10	1
31	DF	(Greece) Nikolaos Georgeas	13	0	3	0	1	0	5	0	22	0
87	DF	(Argentina) Nicolás Bianchi Arce	3	0	0	0	1	0	4	0	8	0
Midfielders
1	MF	(Greece) Pantelis Kafes	25	5	4	0	0	0	7	0	36	5
3	MF	(Netherlands) Youssouf Hersi	20	1	1	0	1	0	4	0	26	1
11	MF	(Brazil) Gustavo Manduca	26	5	6	0	0	0	8	2	40	7
14	MF	(Greece) Grigoris Makos	18	0	3	0	1	0	6	0	28	0
16	MF	(Poland) Roger Guerreiro	14	0	3	0	0	0	0	0	17	0
17	MF	(Greece) Antonis Rikka	0	0	0	0	0	0	0	0	0	0
19	MF	(Greece) Panagiotis Lagos	9	0	6	0	0	0	0	0	15	0
26	MF	(Ghana) Seidu Yahaya	3	0	0	0	0	0	2	0	5	0
34	MF	(Greece) Panagiotis Tachtsidis	9	1	0	0	1	0	2	0	12	1
90	MF	(Greece) Savvas Gentsoglou	13	2	3	0	0	0	4	0	20	2
Forwards
9	FW	(Brazil) Leonardo	23	2	6	3	1	0	7	0	37	5
10	FW	(Algeria) Rafik Djebbour	14	4	5	2	0	0	1	0	20	6
18	FW	(Argentina) Ismael Blanco	29	8	5	1	1	0	8	4	43	13
21	FW	(Greece) Michalis Pavlis	8	0	0	0	1	0	1	0	10	0
29	FW	(Hungary) Krisztián Németh	12	3	5	0	0	0	2	0	19	3
32	FW	(Argentina) Ignacio Scocco	24	8	6	1	1	0	6	2	37	11
Left during Winter Transfer Window
28	GK	(Greece) Theodoros Moschonas	0	0	0	0	0	0	0	0	0	0
7	DF	(Spain) Juanfran	6	0	0	0	0	0	5	0	11	0
8	MF	(Canada) Tam Nsaliwa	5	0	0	0	0	0	6	0	11	0
30	FW	(Romania) Ilie Iordache	3	0	0	0	1	0	2	0	6	0

=== Goalscorers ===
As of 19 May 2010
The list is sorted by competition order when total goals are equal, then by position and then by squad number.

Rank	No.	Pos.	Player	Super League	Super League Play-offs	Greek Cup	Europa League	Total
1	18	FW	(Argentina) Ismael Blanco	8	1	0	4	13
2	32	FW	(Argentina) Ignacio Scocco	8	1	0	2	11
3	11	MF	(Brazil) Gustavo Manduca	5	0	0	2	7
4	10	FW	(Algeria) Rafik Djebbour	4	2	0	0	6
5	1	MF	(Greece) Pantelis Kafes	5	0	0	0	5
5	9	FW	(Brazil) Leonardo	2	3	0	0	5
7	29	FW	(Hungary) Krisztián Németh	3	0	0	0	3
7	5	DF	(Sweden) Daniel Majstorović	2	0	0	1	3
9	90	MF	(Greece) Savvas Gentsoglou	2	0	0	0	2
10	12	DF	(Bosnia and Herzegovina) Sanel Jahić	1	0	0	0	1
10	34	MF	(Greece) Panagiotis Tachtsidis	1	0	0	0	1
10	3	MF	(Netherlands) Youssouf Hersi	1	0	0	0	1
10	24	DF	(Greece) Kostas Manolas	0	1	0	0	1
Own goals				1	0	0	0	1
Totals				43	8	0	9	60

=== Assists ===
As of 19 May 2010
The list is sorted by competition order when total assists are equal, then by position and then by squad number.

Rank	No.	Pos.	Player	Super League	Super League Play-offs	Greek Cup	Europa League	Total
1	11	MF	(Brazil) Gustavo Manduca	4	0	0	1	5
1	10	FW	(Algeria) Rafik Djebbour	4	0	0	1	5
1	32	FW	(Argentina) Ignacio Scocco	3	1	0	1	5
1	29	FW	(Hungary) Krisztián Németh	3	0	0	2	5
5	9	FW	(Brazil) Leonardo	3	0	0	1	4
6	31	DF	(Greece) Nikolaos Georgeas	2	0	0	1	3
6	18	FW	(Argentina) Ismael Blanco	1	1	0	1	3
8	1	MF	(Greece) Pantelis Kafes	1	1	0	0	2
9	15	DF	(Greece) Nikolaos Karabelas	1	0	0	0	1
9	90	MF	(Greece) Savvas Gentsoglou	1	0	0	0	1
9	34	MF	(Greece) Panagiotis Tachtsidis	1	0	0	0	1
9	3	MF	(Netherlands) Youssouf Hersi	1	0	0	0	1
9	2	DF	(Argentina) Carlos Araujo	0	0	0	1	1
Totals				25	3	0	9	37

=== Clean sheets ===
As of 19 May 2010
The list is sorted by competition order when total clean sheets are equal and then by squad number. Clean sheets in games where both goalkeepers participated are awarded to the goalkeeper who started the game. Goalkeepers with no appearances are not included.

Rank	No.	Player	Super League	Super League Play-offs	Greek Cup	Europa League	Total
1	23	(Argentina) Sebastián Saja	8	1	0	2	11
2	22	(Greece) Giannis Arabatzis	1	0	0	0	1
Totals			9	1	0	2	12

=== Disciplinary record ===
As of 19 May 2010

N	P	Nat.	Name	Super League			Super League Play-offs			Greek Cup			Europa League			Total			Notes
N	P	Nat.	Name	Yellow card	Second yellow card	Red card	Yellow card	Second yellow card	Red card	Yellow card	Second yellow card	Red card	Yellow card	Second yellow card	Red card	Yellow card	Second yellow card	Red card	Notes
Goalkeepers
22	GK	(Greece)	Giannis Arabatzis	1												1			
23	GK	(Argentina)	Sebastián Saja	3					1							3		1	
27	GK	(Serbia)	Milan Lukač																
Defenders
2	DF	(Argentina)	Carlos Araujo	4	1		3						2		1	9	1	1	
4	DF	(Portugal)	Geraldo Alves	3									2			5			
5	DF	(Sweden)	Daniel Majstorović	5			2			1			4	1		12	1		
6	DF	(Greece)	Georgios Alexopoulos				1									1			
12	DF	(Bosnia and Herzegovina)	Sanel Jahić	14			2	1					1			17	1		
13	DF	(Greece)	Dimitris Koutromanos																
15	DF	(Greece)	Nikolaos Karabelas	4												4			
24	DF	(Greece)	Kostas Manolas	2			1									3			
31	DF	(Greece)	Nikolaos Georgeas	4			1			1			3	1		9	1		
87	DF	(Argentina)	Nicolás Bianchi Arce										2	1		2	1		
Midfielders
1	MF	(Greece)	Pantelis Kafes	6			1						2			9			
3	MF	(Netherlands)	Youssouf Hersi	1												1			
11	MF	(Brazil)	Gustavo Manduca	4			1						1			6			
14	MF	(Greece)	Grigoris Makos	6			2									8			
16	MF	(Poland)	Roger Guerreiro	2												2			
17	MF	(Greece)	Antonis Rikka																
19	MF	(Greece)	Panagiotis Lagos	1			3									4			
26	MF	(Ghana)	Seidu Yahaya										1			1			
34	MF	(Greece)	Panagiotis Tachtsidis																
90	MF	(Greece)	Savvas Gentsoglou	2									2			4			
Forwards
9	FW	(Brazil)	Leonardo	1												1			
10	FW	(Algeria)	Rafik Djebbour	3												3			
18	MF	(Argentina)	Ismael Blanco	2												2			
21	FW	(Greece)	Michalis Pavlis																
29	FW	(Hungary)	Krisztián Németh	2			2						1			5			
32	FW	(Argentina)	Ignacio Scocco	6	1											6	1		
Left during Winter Transfer window
28	GK	(Greece)	Theodoros Moschonas																
7	DF	(Spain)	Juanfran	1												1			
8	MF	(Canada)	Tam Nsaliwa																
30	FW	(Romania)	Ilie Iordache																

=== Starting 11 ===
This section presents the most frequently used formation along with the players with the most starts across all competitions.

N.	Formation	Matchday(s)
37	4–3–3	1–4, 6, 9–30
6	4–4–2 (D)	5
2	4–4–2	7, 8

No.	Nat.	Player	Pos.
23	(Argentina)	Sebastián Saja	GK
12	(Bosnia and Herzegovina)	Sanel Jahić	RCB
5	(Sweden)	Daniel Majstorović	LCB
2	(Argentina)	Carlos Araujo	RB
31	(Greece)	Nikolaos Georgeas	LB
14	(Greece)	Grigoris Makos	DM
11	(Brazil)	Gustavo Manduca	RCM
1	(Greece)	Pantelis Kafes (C)	LCM
9	(Brazil)	Leonardo	RW
32	(Argentina)	Ignacio Scocco	LW
18	(Argentina)	Ismael Blanco	CF

Last updated: 2010-05-19

=== UEFA rankings ===
UEFA team ranking

Rank 09-10	Mvmt	Rank 08-09	Team	Coeff.
75	+3	78	(Spain) Celta Vigo	26.951
75	+3	78	(Spain) Real Betis	26.951
77	+5	82	(Greece) AEK Athens	25.979
78	+13	91	(England) Aston Villa	25.871
79	−4	75	(Russia) Lokomotiv Moscow	25.758

UEFA country ranking

Rank 09-10	Mvmt	Rank 08-09	League	Coeff.
10	-2	8	(Netherlands) Eredivisie	36.546
11	±0	11	(Turkey) Turkcell Süper Lig	34.450
12	±0	12	Super League Greece	29.899
13	+2	15	(Switzerland) Axpo Super League	28.375
14	±0	14	(Belgium) Jupiler Pro League	27.900

Last updated: 2009-05-17
Source: xs4all.nl

== Awards ==
Player	Pos.	Award	Source
(Hungary) Krisztián Németh	FW	MVP Award (2nd Matchday)	
(Argentina) Ignacio Scocco	FW	MVP Award (7th Matchday)	
(Argentina) Ignacio Scocco	FW	MVP Award (12th Matchday)	
(Argentina) Ignacio Scocco	FW	MVP Award (16th Matchday)	
(Argentina) Ignacio Scocco	FW	Best Goal Award (20th Matchday)	
(Argentina) Ismael Blanco	FW	MVP Award (21st Matchday)	
(Argentina) Ignacio Scocco	FW	MVP Award (22nd Matchday)	
(Argentina) Ignacio Scocco	FW	MVP Award (28th Matchday)	
