= 2008–09 Olympiacos F.C. season =

Olympiacos
2008–09 season
- Chairman: Sokratis Kokkalis
- Manager: Ernesto Valverde
- Stadium: Karaiskakis Stadium, Piraeus
- Super League Greece: Winners
- Greek Cup: Winners
- Champions League: Third qualifying round
- UEFA Cup: Round of 32
- Top goalscorer: League: Luciano Galletti (14); All: Diogo (20)
- Highest home attendance: 30,185 vs Benfica
- Lowest home attendance: 20,392 vs Asteras Tripolis
- Average home league attendance: 25,370
Home colours	Away colours	Third colours

The 2008–09 season was Olympiacos's 50th consecutive season in the Super League Greece and their 83rd year in existence. The club are competing in the UEFA Cup after an 11-year participation in the UEFA Champions League, as they were eliminated in the UEFA Champions League third qualifying round by Anorthosis. In the beginning of the summertime, Olympiacos unveiled Spanish Ernesto Valverde as their new coach.

== Players ==
=== First-team squad ===
Squad at end of season

Note: Flags indicate national team as defined under FIFA eligibility rules; some limited exceptions apply. Players may hold more than one non-FIFA nationality.

No.	Pos.	Nation	Player
1	GK	GRE	Leonidas Panagopoulos
2	DF	GRE	Christos Patsatzoglou
3	DF	FRA	Didier Domi
4	DF	BRA	Leonardo
5	DF	GRE	Georgios Galitsios
6	MF	GRE	Ieroklis Stoltidis (vice-captain)
7	MF	ARG	Luciano Galletti
8	FW	ESP	Óscar
9	FW	SRB	Darko Kovačević
10	FW	BRA	Diogo
11	MF	SRB	Predrag Đorđević (captain)
14	DF	POL	Michał Żewłakow
15	DF	ESP	Raúl Bravo
18	DF	GRE	Paraskevas Antzas
19	MF	GRE	Konstantinos Mendrinos

No.	Pos.	Nation	Player
20	MF	BRA	Dudu Cearense
21	DF	GRE	Avraam Papadopoulos
22	FW	GRE	Kostas Mitroglou
23	MF	ARG	Sebastián Leto
25	MF	ARG	Fernando Belluschi
30	DF	GRE	Anastasios Pantos
31	MF	GRE	Aristides Soiledis Under 20s
33	MF	GRE	Giannis Papadopoulos
35	DF	GRE	Vasilis Torosidis
36	MF	GRE	Giorgos Niklitsiotis
50	GK	SVK	Pavel Kovać
71	GK	GRE	Antonis Nikopolidis (vice-captain)
77	MF	SVN	Mirnes Šišić
92	DF	GRE	Kyriakos Papadopoulos

== Summer squad changes ==
In: Note: Flags indicate national team as defined under FIFA eligibility rules; some limited exceptions apply. Players may hold more than one non-FIFA nationality.

No.	Pos.	Nation	Player
5	DF	GRE	Georgios Galitsios loan return from AEL
8	FW	ESP	Óscar from Real Zaragoza
10	FW	BRA	Diogo from Portuguesa
20	MF	BRA	Dudu Cearense from CSKA Moscow
21	DF	GRE	Avraam Papadopoulos from Aris
23	MF	ARG	Sebastián Leto loan from Liverpool
33	MF	GRE	Giannis Papadopoulos from Iraklis
50	GK	SVK	Pavel Kovać from Apollon Kalamarias

Total spending: ▼€23.8 million

Out: Note: Flags indicate national team as defined under FIFA eligibility rules; some limited exceptions apply. Players may hold more than one non-FIFA nationality.

No.	Pos.	Nation	Player
74	GK	CRO	Tomislav Butina Released and moved to Dinamo Zagreb
87	GK	GRE	Michalis Sifakis (Released)
23	FW	CYP	Michalis Konstantinou Released
10	FW	ARG	Leonel Núñez moved to Independiente
32	FW	COD	Lomana LuaLua moved to Al-Arabi

Total income: ▲€5.5 million

=== Out on loan ===
Note: Flags indicate national team as defined under FIFA eligibility rules; some limited exceptions apply. Players may hold more than one non-FIFA nationality.

No.	Pos.	Nation	Player
13	MF	HUN	Zsolt Laczko to Leicester City
77	MF	BRA	Leozinho to OFI
24	MF	GRE	Georgios Katsikogiannis to Levadiakos

=== Current national players ===
Note: Flags indicate national team as defined under FIFA eligibility rules; some limited exceptions apply. Players may hold more than one non-FIFA nationality.

No.	Pos.	Nation	Player
2	DF	GRE	Christos Patsatzoglou 34 (1)
14	DF	POL	Michał Żewłakow 84 (3)
21	DF	GRE	Avraam Papadopoulos 4 (0)
25	MF	ARG	Fernando Belluschi 2 (0)
28	FW	ARG	Cristian Ledesma 3 (0)
35	DF	GRE	Vasilis Torosidis 20 (1)
77	MF	SVN	Mirnes Šišić 9 (2)
7	MF	ARG	Luciano Galletti 13 (3)

- Appearances (goals)

== Competitions ==
=== Overall ===
Competition	Started round	Current position / round	Final position / round	First match	Last match
Super League Greece	—	1st		30 Aug 2008	26 Apr 2009
Champions League	Third qualifying round	—	Third qualifying round	13 Aug 2008	30 Aug 2008
UEFA Cup	First round	Round of 32		16 Sep 2008	
Greek Cup	Round 4	Round 5		29 Oct 2008	

Updated to match played 17 December 2008
Source: Competitions

=== Super League Greece ===
==== League table ====
Pos	Team	Pld	W	D	L	GF	GA	GD	Pts	Qualification or relegation
1	Olympiacos (C)	30	22	5	3	50	14	+36	71	Qualification for the Champions League third qualifying round
2	PAOK	30	18	9	3	39	16	+23	63	Qualification for the Play-offs
3	Panathinaikos	30	17	10	3	51	18	+33	61	Qualification for the Play-offs
4	AEK Athens	30	14	13	3	40	24	+16	55	Qualification for the Play-offs
5	AEL	30	12	13	5	36	26	+10	49	Qualification for the Play-offs

Source: Super League Greece
Rules for classification: 1) Points; 2) Head-to-head points; 3) Head-to-head goal difference; 4) Play-offs (neutral ground).
(Note: Criterion 4 is only used if needed to decide champion, teams for relegation or teams for UEFA competitions).
(C) Champions

==== Results summary ====
Overall								Home						Away					
Pld	W	D	L	GF	GA	GD	Pts	W	D	L	GF	GA	GD	W	D	L	GF	GA	GD
30	22	5	3	50	14	+36	71	13	1	1	33	8	+25	9	4	2	17	6	+11

Last updated: April 26, 2009.
Source: Super League Greece

==== Results by round ====
Round	1	2	3	4	5	6	7	8	9	10	11	12	13	14	15	16	17	18	19	20	21	22	23	24	25	26	27	28	29	30
Ground	H	A	H	A	H	H	A	H	A	H	A	H	H	A	H	A	H	A	H	A	A	H	A	H	A	H	A	A	H	A
Result	W	W	W	D	W	W	L	W	D	W	W	W	W	D	W	W	W	W	W	W	W	W	L	D	D	W	W	W	L	W
Position	2	2	1	1	1	1	1	1	1	1	1	1	1	1	1	1	1	1	1	1	1	1	1	1	1	1	1	1	1	1

Source: Olympiacos FC
A = Away; H = Home; W = Win; D = Draw; L = Loss

==== Matches ====
All times at EET

30 August 2008 1	Olympiacos	3–1	Asteras Tripolis	Piraeus
19:00	Galletti 61', 63' (pen.); Kovačević 81'	Report	Cesarec 45+2' (pen.)	Stadium: Karaiskakis Stadium; Attendance: 20,392; Referee: Michalis Germanakos

13 September 2008 2	Skoda Xanthi	0–1	Olympiacos	Xanthi
16:45		Report	Diogo 72'	Stadium: Skoda Xanthi Arena; Attendance: 4,409; Referee: Ioannis Stavridis

21 September 2008 3	Olympiacos	4–1	Panserraikos	Piraeus
19:00	Kovačević 23'; Galletti 27'; Diogo 81'; Óscar 88'	Report	Tadić 85' (pen.)	Stadium: Karaiskakis Stadium; Attendance: 25,234; Referee: Stavros Tritsonis

27 September 2008 4	OFI	0–0	Olympiacos	Heraklion
19:00		Report		Stadium: Pankritio Stadium; Attendance: 9,384; Referee: Ilias Mazarakos

5 October 2008 5	Olympiacos	2–0	AEK Athens	Piraeus
21:15	Kovačević 63'; Diogo 66'	Report		Stadium: Karaiskakis Stadium; Attendance: 30,074; Referee: Kyros Vassaras

19 October 2008 6	Olympiacos	2–0	Panthrakikos	Piraeus
19:00	Galletti 66', 73'	Report		Stadium: Karaiskakis Stadium; Attendance: 23,693; Referee: Konstantinos Papastamatis

26 October 2008 7	Aris	1–0	Olympiacos	Thessaloniki
19:00	Javito 18'	Report		Stadium: Kleanthis Vikelidis Stadium; Attendance: 16,370; Referee: Vasileios Paboridis

2 November 2008 8	Olympiacos	2–0	Ergotelis	Piraeus
19:00	Kovačević 28'; Dudu 34'	Report		Stadium: Karaiskakis Stadium; Attendance: 26,058; Referee: Ioannis Stavridis

9 November 2008 9	Panathinaikos	0–0	Olympiacos	Athens
19:00		Report		Stadium: Olympic Stadium; Attendance: 60,401; Referee: Georgios Daloukas

16 November 2008 10	Olympiacos	2–0	PAOK	Piraeus
19:00	Patsatzoglou 45'; Diogo 86'	Report		Stadium: Karaiskakis Stadium; Attendance: 29,482; Referee: Anastasios Kakos

22 November 2008 11	Iraklis	0–3	Olympiacos	Thessaloniki
19:00		Report	Đorđević 34'; Belluschi 39'; Dudu 81'	Stadium: Kaftanzoglio Stadium; Attendance: 9,066; Referee: Kyros Vassaras

30 November 2008 12	Olympiacos	4–1	Panionios	Piraeus
19:00	Belluschi 31'; Diogo 52'; Mitroglou 78', 80'	Report	Goundoulakis 87'	Stadium: Karaiskakis Stadium; Attendance: 27,487; Referee: Dimitrios Kyrkos

7 December 2008 13	Olympiacos	1–0	Levadiakos	Piraeus
19:00	Belluschi 28'	Report		Stadium: Karaiskakis Stadium; Attendance: 22,337; Referee: Georgios Giannopoulos

13 December 2008 14	AEL	1–1	Olympiacos	Larissa
16:45	Solano 74'	Report	Belluschi 52'	Stadium: Alcazar Stadium; Attendance: 5,062; Referee: Anastasios Kakos

21 December 2008 15	Olympiacos	2–1	Thrasyvoulos	Piraeus
19:00	Leto 21'; Galletti 90+3' (pen.)	Report	Chloros 29'	Stadium: Karaiskakis Stadium; Attendance: 20,033; Referee: Georgios Kastanidis

3 January 2009 16	Asteras Tripolis	0–1	Olympiacos	Tripoli
19:00		Report	Galletti 27' (pen.)	Stadium: Asteras Tripolis Stadium; Attendance: 5,864; Referee: Vasileios Paboridis

10 January 2009 17	Olympiacos	2–1	Skoda Xanthi	Piraeus
19:00	Stathakis 16' (o.g.); Galletti 19'	Report	Zuela 27'	Stadium: Karaiskakis Stadium; Attendance: 25,484; Referee: Michalis Germanakos

17 January 2009 18	Panserraikos	0–1	Olympiacos	Serres
16:45		Report	Torosidis 26'	Stadium: Serres Municipal Stadium; Attendance: 7,013; Referee: Georgios Daloukas

24 January 2009 19	Olympiacos	2–1	OFI	Piraeus
19:00	Diogo 7'; Galletti 67'	Report	Simić 62'	Stadium: Karaiskakis Stadium; Attendance: 25,633; Referee: Konstantinos Papastamatis

1 February 2009 20	AEK Athens	0–1	Olympiacos	Athens
19:00		Report	Galletti 5'	Stadium: Olympic Stadium; Attendance: 44,104; Referee: Dimitrios Kalopoulos

7 February 2009 21	Panthrakikos	0–2	Olympiacos	Komotini
16:45		Report	Belluschi 27'; Galletti 45'	Stadium: Komotini Municipal Stadium; Attendance: 4,700; Referee: Georgios Stathopoulos

14 February 2009 22	Olympiacos	2–1	Aris	Piraeus
19:00	Đorđević 23'; Galletti 75'	Report	Torosidis 90' (o.g.)	Stadium: Karaiskakis Stadium; Attendance: 25,867; Referee: Nathanail Charalabidis

22 February 2009 23	Ergotelis	1–0	Olympiacos	Heraklion
19:00	Koutsianikoulis 22'	Report		Stadium: Pankritio Stadium; Attendance: 2,818; Referee: Michail Dakos

1 March 2009 24	Olympiacos	0–0	Panathinaikos	Piraeus
18:30		Report		Stadium: Karaiskakis Stadium; Attendance: 28,775; Referee: Ilias Spathas

8 March 2009 25	PAOK	0–0	Olympiacos	Thessaloniki
19:00		Report		Stadium: Toumba Stadium; Attendance: 22,214; Referee: Anastasios Kakos

15 March 2009 26	Olympiacos	5–0	Iraklis	Piraeus
19:00	Torosidis 60'; Óscar 64', 79'; Derbyshire 82', 87'	Report		Stadium: Karaiskakis Stadium; Attendance: 25,182; Referee: Georgios Daloukas

22 March 2009 27	Panionios	2–3	Olympiacos	Athens
20:00	Lourenço 45'; Gonzaga 51'	Report	Derbyshire 22'; Maniatis 61' (o.g.); Dudu 72'	Stadium: Nea Smyrni Stadium; Attendance: 2,905; Referee: Michael Koukoulakis

5 April 2009 28	Levadiakos	1–2	Olympiacos	Livadeia
19:00	Dimbala 17'	Report	Derbyshire 28'; Galletti 75'	Stadium: Levadia Municipal Stadium; Attendance: 3,317; Referee: Konstantinos Papastamatis

12 April 2009 29	Olympiacos	0–1	AEL	Piraeus
19:00		Report	Żurawski 54'	Stadium: Karaiskakis Stadium; Attendance: 24,280; Referee: Ilias Spathas

26 April 2009 30	Thrasyvoulos	0–2	Olympiacos	Fyli
19:00		Report	Derbyshire 65'; Galletti 74' (pen.)	Stadium: Fyli Municipal Stadium; Attendance: 926; Referee: Georgios Stathopoulos

=== Greek Cup ===
==== Fourth round ====
29 October 2008	Diagoras	2–3	Olympiacos	Rhodes
16:50	Triantafyllou 30', 66'	Report	Óscar 14'; Diogo 67'; Kovačević 84'	Stadium: Diagoras Stadium; Referee: Spiros Stathopoulos

==== Fifth round ====
21 January 2009	OFI	0–2	Olympiacos	Heraklion
20:00		Report	Belluschi 69'; Galetti 85' (pen.)	Stadium: Pankritio Stadium; Attendance: 4,102; Referee: Anastasios Kakos

==== Quarter-finals ====
4 February 2009 First leg	PAOK	1–0	Olympiacos	Thessaloniki
21:15	Sérgio Conceição 30'	Report		Stadium: Toumba Stadium; Attendance: 21,043; Referee: Anastasios Kakos

4 March 2009 Second leg	Olympiacos	2–0 (a.e.t.) (2–1 agg.)	PAOK	Piraeus
21:15	Diogo 46'; Derbyshire 109'	Report		Stadium: Karaiskakis Stadium; Attendance: 23,983; Referee: Michael Koukoulakis

==== Semi-finals ====
18 March 2009 First leg	Asteras Tripolis	2–2	Olympiacos	Tripoli
21:15	Filomeno 29', 35'	Report	Diogo 43', 74'	Stadium: Asteras Tripolis Stadium; Attendance: 3,875; Referee: Dimitrios Kalopoulos

9 April 2009 Second leg	Olympiacos	2–1 (4–3 agg.)	Asteras Tripolis	Piraeus
18:00	Leto 47'; Diogo 62'	Report	Cesarec 39'	Stadium: Karaiskakis Stadium; Attendance: 18,989; Referee: Georgios Daloukas

==== Final ====
2 May 2009 Final	AEK Athens	4–4 (a.e.t.) (14–15 p)	Olympiacos	Athens
20:30	Blanco 4', 8'; Scocco 90', 107'	Report	Derbyshire 47', 90+6'; Dudu 72'; Galletti 102'	Stadium: Olympic Stadium; Attendance: 48,594; Referee: Anastasios Kakos
	Penalties
	Kafes (penalty scored); Blanco (penalty scored); Scocco (penalty scored); Edinho (penalty scored); Majstorović (penalty missed); Nsaliwa (penalty scored); Saja (penalty scored); Pelletieri (penalty scored); Georgeas (penalty missed); Kafes (penalty scored); Blanco (penalty scored); Scocco (penalty scored); Edinho (penalty scored); Majstorović (penalty scored); Nsaliwa (penalty scored); Saja (penalty scored); Pelletieri (penalty missed)		(penalty scored) Óscar; (penalty scored) Dudu; (penalty scored) Diogo; (penalty scored) Domi; (penalty missed) Đorđević; (penalty scored) Torosidis; (penalty scored) Belluschi; (penalty scored) Nikopolidis; (penalty missed) Antzas; (penalty scored) Óscar; (penalty scored) Dudu; (penalty scored) Diogo; (penalty scored) Domi; (penalty scored) Đorđević; (penalty scored) Torosidis; (penalty scored) Belluschi; (penalty scored) Nikopolidis

=== UEFA Champions League ===
All times at CET

==== Third qualifying round ====
13 August 2008 First leg	Anorthosis (Cyprus)	3–0	(Greece) Olympiacos	Larnaca, Cyprus
20:00	Torosidis 4' (o.g.); Sosin 17'; Laban 85'	(Report)		Stadium: Antonis Papadopoulos Stadium; Attendance: 10,500; Referee: Olegário Benquerença (Portugal)

27 August 2008 Second leg	Olympiacos (Greece)	1–0 (1–3 agg.)	(Cyprus) Anorthosis	Piraeus, Greece
20:00	Belluschi 54'	(Report)		Stadium: Karaiskakis Stadium; Attendance: 27,904; Referee: Herbert Fandel (Germany)

=== UEFA Cup ===
All times at CET

==== First round ====
16 September 2008 First leg	Nordsjælland (Denmark)	0–2	(Greece) Olympiacos	Farum, Denmark
20:00		(Report)	Mitroglou 74'; Leto 90+3'	Stadium: Farum Park; Attendance: 5,184; Referee: Stefan Messner (Austria)

2 October 2008 Second leg	Olympiacos (Greece)	5–0 (7–0 agg.)	(Denmark) Nordsjælland	Piraeus, Greece
20:45	Torosidis 11'; Diogo 30', 43'; Kovačević 72', 80'	(Report)		Stadium: Karaiskakis Stadium; Attendance: 24,515; Referee: Igor Egorov (Russia)

==== Group stage ====
Pos	Team	Pld	W	D	L	GF	GA	GD	Pts	Qualification	MET	GAL	OLY	HER	BEN
1	(Ukraine) Metalist Kharkiv	4	3	1	0	3	0	+3	10	Advance to knockout stage	—	—	1–0	0–0	—
2	(Turkey) Galatasaray	4	3	0	1	4	1	+3	9	Advance to knockout stage	0–1	—	1–0	—	—
3	(Greece) Olympiacos	4	2	0	2	9	3	+6	6	Advance to knockout stage	—	—	—	4–0	5–1
4	(Germany) Hertha BSC	4	0	2	2	1	6	−5	2		—	0–1	—	—	1–1
5	(Portugal) Benfica	4	0	1	3	2	9	−7	1		0–1	0–2	—	—	—

Source: RSSSF

23 October 2008 1	Galatasaray (Turkey)	1–0	(Greece) Olympiacos	Istanbul, Turkey
20:15	Kewell 25'	(Report)		Stadium: Ali Sami Yen Stadium; Attendance: 23,500; Referee: Eduardo Iturralde González (Spain)

27 November 2008 2	Olympiacos (Greece)	5–1	(Portugal) Benfica	Piraeus, Greece
20:45	Galletti 1'; Patsatzoglou 17'; Diogo 24', 53'; Belluschi 44'	(Report)	David Luiz 33'	Stadium: Karaiskakis Stadium; Attendance: 30,185; Referee: Stéphane Lannoy (France)

3 December 2008 3	Metalist Kharkiv (Ukraine)	1–0	(Greece) Olympiacos	Kharkiv, Ukraine
20:45	Edmar 88'	(Report)		Stadium: Metalist Stadium; Attendance: 25,000; Referee: William Collum (Scotland)

18 December 2008 4	Olympiacos (Greece)	4–0	(Germany) Hertha BSC	Piraeus, Greece
20:45	Dudu 55'; Galletti 68' (pen.); Torosidis 87'; Diogo 88'	(Report)		Stadium: Karaiskakis Stadium; Attendance: 30,063; Referee: Martin Hansson (Sweden)

==== Round of 32 ====
18 February 2009 First leg	Olympiacos (Greece)	1–3	(France) Saint-Étienne	Piraeus, Greece
18:30	Đorđević 63'	Report	Ilan 12'; Dernis 43'; Gomis 90'	Stadium: Karaiskakis Stadium; Attendance: 33,000; Referee: Lucílio Batista (Portugal)

26 February 2009 Second leg	Saint-Étienne (France)	2–1 (5–2 agg.)	(Greece) Olympiacos	Saint-Étienne, France
20:55	Payet 45'; Ilan 58'	Report	Óscar 75'	Stadium: Stade Geoffroy-Guichard; Attendance: 30,511; Referee: Paul Allaerts (Belgium)

== Team kit ==
Home	Away	Third	Friendlies

== Individual Awards ==
Name	Pos.	Award
(Argentina) Luciano Galleti	Winger	Super League Greece Player of the Season; Super League Greece Best Foreign Player; Super League Greece Golden Boot
(Greece) Antonios Nikopolidis	Goalkeeper	Super League Greece Goalkeeper of the Season
