= Carlos Araujo =

Argentine footballer (born 1981)

Personal information
- Full name: Carlos Luciano Araujo
- Date of birth: 19 November 1981 (age 44)
- Place of birth: Mendoza, Argentina
- Height: 1.72 m (5 ft 8 in)
- Position: Right-back

Youth career
- Independiente Rivadavia

Senior career*
Years	Team	Apps	(Gls)
2000–2002	Independiente Rivadavia	23	(2)
2002–2004	Atlético de Rafaela	72	(0)
2004–2005	Racing Club	28	(0)
2005–2006	Estudiantes	15	(0)
2006–2007	Newell's Old Boys	24	(2)
2007–2008	Olimpo	24	(1)
2008–2009	Huracán	35	(1)
2009–2011	AEK Athens	30	(0)
2011	→ Lanús (loan)	6	(0)
2011–2016	Lanús	116	(1)
2016–2020	Huracán	65	(2)
2020–2021	Independiente Rivadavia	7	(0)

International career
2001–03	Argentina U-20	16	(0)
- * Club domestic league appearances and goals

Carlos Luciano Araujo (born November 19, 1981) is a retired Argentine football player, who played as a right-back.

== Career ==
Araujo started his career with Independiente Rivadavia. He then played for Atlético de Rafaela, with which he won 2002–03 season of the Primera B Nacional (second division), earning promotion to the Primera Division. Subsequently, he played for major Argentine clubs, including Estudiantes de La Plata, Newell's Old Boys and Huracán. After a successful season with Huracán, Araujo decided to take the big step to Europe in the second half of 2009, joining Greek club AEK Athens F.C. Araujo was cited as the "best right back in Argentina" by his former Huracán coach Ángel Cappa, whilst his transfer was described by a journalist as a "key player loss" for Huracán.

Araujo signed a 3-year contract with AEK Athens on August 18, 2009. AEK signed Araujo as a free agent. Araujo was the fifth Argentine AEK Athens player for the 2009–10 season, the others being Sebastián Saja, Ignacio Scocco, Nicolás Bianchi Arce and Ismael Blanco. Although good performances in Greece and Europe, Araujo had to return to Argentina due to a sudden family issue in July 2010. Ηe left AEK Athens after the conflicts between him and the team were close to lead to court. He was loaned the remaining year of his contract in Lanus having previously denied a loan offer from Independiente Rivadavia despite pressure from AEK Athens.

On December 23, 2010, Araujo returned to Argentina, joining Lanús.

== Honours ==
Lanús

- Copa Sudamericana: 2013
