= Nicolás Bianchi Arce =

Argentine footballer

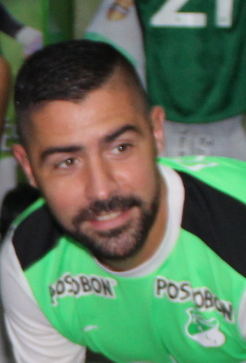

Personal information
- Full name: Nicolás Alexis Bianchi Arce
- Date of birth: January 28, 1987 (age 39)
- Place of birth: Buenos Aires, Argentina
- Height: 1.88 m (6 ft 2 in)
- Position: Centre back

Senior career*
Years	Team	Apps	(Gls)
2006–2012	San Lorenzo	100	(2)
2009–2010	→ AEK Athens (loan)	6	(0)
2010–2011	→ Olimpo (loan)	31	(1)
2013–2015	Pescara	10	(0)
2013–2015	→ Banfield (loan)	86	(3)
2016	Deportivo Cali	10	(0)
2016–2017	Sarmiento	24	(0)
2017–2018	CA Atlanta	27	(0)
- * Club domestic league appearances and goals

Nicolás Bianchi Arce (born 28 January 1987) is an Argentine retired football defender.

== Career ==
=== San Lorenzo ===
Bianchi Arce started his professional career in 2006 at San Lorenzo. He made his debut against Independiente and went to become a regular in the San Lorenzo starting eleven. He scored his first goal for San Lorenzo against Tigre and his second against Newell's Old Boys.

In 2007, Bianchi Arce helped San Lorenzo win the Clausura tournament in 2007. He played a total 72 matches for San Lorenzo and scored 2 goals.

=== AEK Athens ===
On August 31, 2009, Bianchi Arce joined AEK Athens, on loan for one year with a purchase option of €1.5 million. He became the fifth Argentine AEK Athens player at that moment, the others being Sebastián Saja, Ismael Blanco, Ignacio Scocco and Carlos Araujo. He made his debut against Everton in the UEFA Europa League on September 17, 2009, playing the full 90 minutes.

=== Olimpo ===
Bianchi Arce returned to Argentina to play for recently promoted Olimpo for the 2010-11 Argentine Primera División season, on loan from San Lorenzo.

=== Pescara ===
On December 19, 2012, he signed for the Italian club Pescara, in Serie A. His transfer had a cost of about €1 million.

=== Retirement ===
In the summer 2018 it was confirmed, that Arce had decided to retire.

== Honours ==
Season	Club	Title
Clausura 2007	San Lorenzo	Primera Division Argentina
