= Milan Lukač =

Serbian footballer

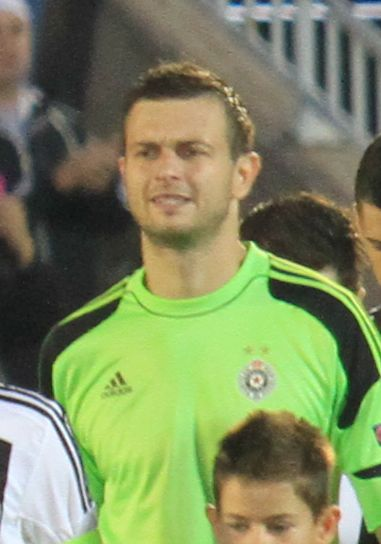
- Lukač with Partizan in 2014

Personal information
- Full name: Milan Lukač
- Date of birth: 4 October 1985 (age 41)
- Place of birth: Novi Sad, SFR Yugoslavia
- Height: 1.97 m (6 ft 5 1/2 in)
- Position: Goalkeeper

Youth career
- Mladost Bački Jarak

Senior career*
Years	Team	Apps	(Gls)
2003–2004	Mladost Bački Jarak		
2004–2005	Žarkovo	31	(0)
2005–2007	Srem	59	(0)
2007–2009	Čukarički	24	(0)
2009–2011	AEK Athens	0	(0)
2011–2013	OFK Beograd	57	(0)
2013–2015	Partizan	29	(0)
2015–2021	Akhisarspor	104	(0)
2021–2023	Partizan	0	(0)
Total		304	(0)

International career^{‡}
2014	Serbia	1	(0)
- * Club domestic league appearances and goals as of 13 March 2023 ‡ National team caps and goals as of 26 May 2015

Milan Lukač (Serbian Cyrillic: Милан Лукач; born 4 October 1985) is a Serbian retired footballer who played as a goalkeeper.

== Club career ==
Lukač started his career in the team FK Mladost from Bački Jarak, with whom he competed in Serbian League Vojvodina. Season 2004/05. he played for OFK Žarkovo in Serbian League Belgrade, after which he played two years for FK Srem in Serbian First League. In the highest rank, Serbian SuperLiga, he made his debut in the 2007/08 season as a goalkeeper of Čukarički. During the summer of 2009, he signed a contract with AEK Athens. In two years in the Greek club, he played in only one competitive game, on November 5, 2009 against BATE Borisov (2:2) in the group stage of the Europa League.

In the summer of 2011, Lukač signed with OFK Beograd. He spent two seasons at Karaburma, making 64 competitive appearances for the club. In June 2013, Lukač moved to Partizan, penning a three-year deal. He started the 2013/14 season as the first goalkeeper of the Black-Whites, playing in the qualification matches for Champions League against Armenian club Shirak and Bulgarian Ludogorets. In the game with Ludogorets, he was injured, after which he was absent from the field for six weeks. After recovering from injury, Lukač was a reserve for Vladimir Stojković until the end of the first part of the championship. Stojković left the club in the winter transfer window, after which Lukač took the place of the first goalkeeper. In the 146th Eternal derby, on 26 April 2014, Lukač saved two penalty kicks against Red Star, first to Miloš Ninković and then Nikola Mijailović. In the end, Partizan won with a score of 2:1, and Lukač became only the second goalkeeper to save two penalties in Eternal derby (the first was Ratomir Dujković in the 43rd Eternal derby in 1970). In the next 2014/15 season, Partizan won the title in Serbian SuperLiga and Lukač had the status of the first goalkeeper during the autumn part of the championship, while in the spring part his place was taken by Živko Živković. In this season, Lukač also played in the group stage of Europa League with Partizan. He played in all the matches of Group C in which the opponents of the Belgrade club were Tottenham, Beşiktaş and Asteras Tripolis. In two years he spent at Partizan, Lukač played in a total of 46 competitive matches (29 championship, 16 European and one cup match).

In July 2015, he signed a three-year contract with Turkish club Akhisar Belediyespor. He spent the next six years in the Turkish club, playing 104 league games. In the first four seasons with the club, he played in the highest rank, Süper Lig, and the last two in the second tier of the competition. On 10 May 2018, Lukač helped Akhisar Belediyespor win their first professional trophy, the 2017–18 Turkish Cup.

== International career ==
Lukač made his international debut for Serbia in a friendly match against Brazil on 6 June 2014, coming on as a substitute for Vladimir Stojković in the 89th minute. He managed to save a header from Jô in the second minute of injury time.

== Career statistics ==
Appearances and goals by club, season and competition
Club	Season	League			Cup		Continental		Other		Total	
Club	Season	Division	Apps	Goals	Apps	Goals	Apps	Goals	Apps	Goals	Apps	Goals
Žarkovo	2004–05	Belgrade League	31	0	0	0	—		—		31	0
Srem	2005–06	Serbian First League	30	0	0	0	—		—		30	0
Srem	2006–07	Serbian First League	29	0	0	0	—		—		29	0
Srem	Total		59	0	0	0	—		—		59	0
Čukarički	2007–08	Serbian SuperLiga	3	0	0	0	—		—		3	0
Čukarički	2008–09	Serbian SuperLiga	21	0	0	0	—		—		21	0
Čukarički	Total		24	0	0	0	—		—		24	0
AEK Athens	2009–10	Super League Greece	0	0	0	0	1	0	—		1	0
AEK Athens	2010–11	Super League Greece	0	0	0	0	0	0	—		0	0
AEK Athens	Total		0	0	0	0	1	0	—		1	0
OFK Beograd	2011–12	Serbian SuperLiga	30	0	3	0	0	0	—		33	0
OFK Beograd	2012–13	Serbian SuperLiga	27	0	4	0	0	0	—		31	0
OFK Beograd	Total		57	0	7	0	0	0	—		64	0
Partizan	2013–14	Serbian SuperLiga	13	0	0	0	4	0	—		17	0
Partizan	2014–15	Serbian SuperLiga	16	0	1	0	12	0	—		29	0
Partizan	Total		29	0	1	0	16	0	—		46	0
Akhisar Belediyespor	2015–16	Süper Lig	24	0	1	0	—		—		25	0
Akhisar Belediyespor	2016–17	Süper Lig	12	0	4	0	—		—		16	0
Akhisar Belediyespor	2017–18	Süper Lig	29	0	0	0	—		—		29	0
Akhisar Belediyespor	2018–19	Süper Lig	8	0	2	0	4	0	0	0	14	0
Akhisar Belediyespor	2019–20	TFF 1. Lig	8	0	1	0	—		—		9	0
Akhisar Belediyespor	2020–21	TFF 1. Lig	23	0	0	0	—		—		23	0
Akhisar Belediyespor	Total		104	0	8	0	4	0	—		116	0
Partizan	2021–22	Serbian SuperLiga	0	0	0	0	0	0	—		0	0
Partizan	2022–23	Serbian SuperLiga	0	0	1	0	0	0	—		1	0
Partizan	Total		0	0	1	0	0	0	—		1	0
Career total			304	0	17	0	21	0	0	0	342	0

== Honours ==
Partizan

- Serbian SuperLiga (1): 2014–15

Akhisarspor

- Turkish Cup (1): 2017-18
