= Savvas Gentsoglou =

Greek footballer

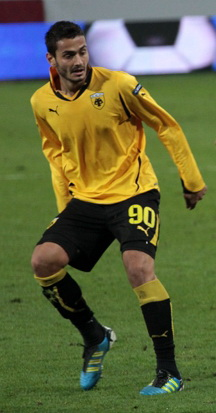
- Gentsoglou playing for AEK Athens

Personal information
- Full name: Savvas Gentsoglou
- Date of birth: 19 September 1990 (age 36)
- Place of birth: Alexandroupoli, Greece
- Height: 1.88 m (6 ft 2 in)
- Positions: Defensive midfielder; center back

Youth career
- 2005–2006: AEK Athens

Senior career*
Years	Team	Apps	(Gls)
2006–2012	AEK Athens	41	(2)
2007	→ Panachaiki (loan)	7	(0)
2008	→ Nea Ionia (loan)	0	(0)
2012–2014	Sampdoria	5	(0)
2012–2013	→ Livorno (loan)	34	(0)
2013–2014	→ Spezia (loan)	12	(0)
2014–2015	Ergotelis	26	(0)
2015–2017	Bari	12	(0)
2016–2017	→ Hajduk Split (loan)	24	(0)
2017–2018	Hajduk Split	24	(2)
2018–2020	APOEL	17	(0)
2020–2021	Al-Adalah	39	(2)
2021–2023	Lamia	20	(0)
2023–2024	Kavala	4	(1)

International career
2008–2009	Greece U17	6	(1)
2009–2010	Greece U19	13	(1)
2010–2012	Greece U21	8	(0)
- * Club domestic league appearances and goals as of 13 June 2023

Savvas Gentsoglou (Greek: Σάββας Γκέντσογλου, pronounced [ˌsavas ˈɡent͜soɣlu]; born 19 September 1990) is a Greek former professional footballer who played as a defensive midfielder.

== Club career ==
=== AEK Athens ===
Savvas Gentsoglou was promoted from the AEK Athens youth system to the senior side in 2006, but didn't make his first appearance for AEK until the 2008–09 season. On 25 June 2008, Gentsoglou renewed his contract with AEK until 2014. Gentsoglou was first used as a central defender by coach Dušan Bajević. Gentsoglou moved to the defensive midfield position in the middle of the 2009–10 season and became a key player of the starting eleven. Gentsoglou scored his first goal for AEK against Atromitos in a 3–2 home win. The following week Gentsoglou scored the equalising goal against Kavala. On 20 May 2010, Gentsoglou signed a new four-year deal.

=== Sampdoria ===
On 19 January 2012, Gentsoglou joined Italian side Sampdoria. Gentsoglou did not feature for Sampdoria in the 2011–12 season, and was sent out on loan the following season to Serie B squad Livorno to gain playing experience. Gentsoglou made 35 appearances for Livorno, as the side won promotion to Serie A.

Gentsoglou then returned to Sampdoria for the 2013–14 Serie A season, but after again failing to establish himself in the Doria first eleven, he moved on loan to Serie B side Spezia Calcio in January 2014.

=== Ergotelis ===
On 30 August 2014, Gentzoglou returned to Greece to continue his career in the Super League, playing for Ergotelis, signing a two-and-a-half-year deal.

=== Bari ===
On 23 June 2015, the Serie B club Bari announced the signing of Gentsoglou till the summer of 2018 for an undisclosed fee.

=== Hajduk ===
On 8 August 2016, the Prva HNL club Hajduk Split announced the signing of Gentsoglou on a twelve-month loan deal from Bari 1908. On 14 August 2016, Gentsoglou made his Hajduk debut, the 5th round of the Prva HNL, playing the first 66 minutes in a 1–1 draw with NK Osijek at Stadion Gradski vrt, before being substituted for Toma Bašić.

On 27 June 2017, after spending a year on loan at Hajduk, Gentsoglou signed a two-year contract with Hajduk, finalizing his move from Bari. On 23 July 2017, he scored his first goal with the club in all competitions in a Prva HNL 2–2 away draw against Inter Zaprešić. On 18 March 2018, he scored in a 3–3 away draw game against NK Osijek.

=== APOEL ===
On 16 July 2018, Savvas terminated his contract with Hajduk, eventually joining APOEL on a two years' contract for an undisclosed fee.

=== Al-Adalah ===
On 29 January 2020, Savvas Gentzoglou solved his contract with APOEL and signed with Saudi club Al-Adalah until the end of the season, and the contract will be renewed if the club remain in the country's 1st division. On 10 July 2020, he renew his contract with the club until the summer of 2021, with a contract worth €900,000. On 20 August, he opened the score with a penalty kick in a 2–4 home loss against Al Wahda FC.

=== Lamia ===
On 12 June 2021, Lamia from the Greek Super League 1 announced a two-year contract with Gentzoglou.

== International career ==
Gentsoglou was first called up to the Greece U-19 in 2007; he featured in all of Greece's games in qualifying for the 2008 UEFA European Under-19 Championship.

== Personal life ==
From 2013 to 2018 was in a relationship with singer Aggeliki Iliadi. On 8 July 2014, Iliadi gave birth to their son, Vasilis Gentsoglou.
