= Ilie Iordache =

Romanian footballer

Personal information
- Date of birth: 23 March 1985 (age 41)
- Place of birth: Bucharest, Romania
- Height: 1.78 m (5 ft 10 in)
- Position: Attacking midfielder

Youth career
- 1999–2003: Faur București

Senior career*
Years	Team	Apps	(Gls)
2003–2004	CSM Reșița	23	(5)
2004–2005	Universitatea Craiova	13	(0)
2005–2008	Dinamo II București	27	(7)
2006–2008	→ Pandurii Târgu Jiu (loan)	55	(11)
2008–2009	Pandurii Târgu Jiu	16	(0)
2009–2010	AEK Athens	3	(0)
2010	→ Rapid București (loan)	12	(0)
2010–2011	Pandurii Târgu Jiu	13	(1)
2011	Gloria Bistriţa	9	(0)
2011–2012	Concordia Chiajna	19	(3)
2013	Târgu Mureş	8	(1)
2013–2015	Săgeata Năvodari	14	(0)
2015–2019	FC Holzhausen		
- * Club domestic league appearances and goals as of 20 June 2016

Ilie Iordache (born 23 March 1985 in București) is a Romanian former footballer who played as a midfielder, most recently for German club FC Holzhausen.

== Career ==
Iordache started his professional career at CSM Reșița in 2003. Iordache was sold to Universitatea Craiova making there his debut on Liga I against Gloria Bistriţa. During 2005–06, Iordache signed for Dinamo București II, he was a mainstay in the starting 11 and was regularly playing as an attacking midfielder. Iordache also scored the goal which won the derby against their rivals FC Rapid Bucharest.

Iordache then transferred to Pandurii Târgu Jiu agreeing to a 3-year contract, being their greatest signing in the summer 2006. Iordache scored on his debut against Craiova. Iordache also scored the winning goal against Rapid Bucharest in the cup final. Iordache did not resign his contract since he is ready to play abroad.

On 17 June, Iordache signed a 3-year contract with AEK.

At the start of 2010, Rapid completed the loan deal that will bring Iordache (back in Romania, at least until the end of the season. Iordache has a contract with AEK Athens that will only expire in 2012, but the player seems to have realized that he has slim chances to play regular there and spoke about the possibility of a permanent deal. On 19 July 2010 Iordache released on a free by AEK.

Iordache previously played for Romania squads U-17 and U-19.
