= Grigoris Makos =

Greek footballer (born 1987)

Personal information
- Full name: Evrypidis Grigorios Makos
- Date of birth: 18 January 1987 (age 39)
- Place of birth: Athens, Greece
- Height: 1.83 m (6 ft 0 in)
- Position: Midfielder

Youth career
- 2000–2003: Ilioupoli
- 2003–2004: Panionios

Senior career*
Years	Team	Apps	(Gls)
2004–2009	Panionios	130	(5)
2009–2012	AEK Athens	75	(2)
2012–2013	1860 München	11	(0)
2013–2015	Anorthosis Famagusta	51	(1)
2015–2017	Panetolikos	52	(3)
2018	Trikala	19	(0)
2018–2019	Kallithea	7	(0)
2019–2020	Kalamata	10	(1)

International career
2006–2008	Greece U-21	17	(3)
2008–2012	Greece	13	(0)
- * Club domestic league appearances and goals as of 31 August 2020

Grigoris Makos (Greek: Γρηγόρης Μάκος; born 18 January 1987) is a Greek former professional footballer who played as a midfielder.

== Club career ==
=== Panionios ===
In 2000, Makos signed for Panionios from Ilioupoli at the age of 13. After impressing in the youth academy, he was eventually called up to the Greece national football team in 2003 and made his debut in a match against Proodeftiki on 23 May 2004. Makos scored his first goal for Panionios on 1 October 2005, against Levadiakos. And his first ever European goal vs Bordeaux on 20 December 2007. He was appointed captain in 2006 at the age of 19. During his time at the club, he had become one of Panionios' most important players making over 100 appearances for the club at the young age of 21 and guiding them to successive fifth-place finishes. His impressive performances attracted interest from the "big three" of Greece and also from teams abroad. In the end Makos agreed to join AEK Athens.

=== AEK Athens ===
On 24 June 2009, AEK signed Makos for €800,000 from Panionios signing a five-year deal with the Athenian club. Soon after signing, Makos stated "One of the main reasons I decided to come here is because of Dušan Bajević". On 6 July, Makos decided to continue using the number 14 at AEK, a number which he has used since his youth career.

On 20 August, Makos made his official debut for AEK, in the game versus Vaslui in the Europa League. Makos made his league debut in the 0–1 away win over Atromitos on 30 August. An unconvincing pre-season and start to the season seen Makos dropped from the starting 11 to the bench. In his first season at AEK, Makos made a total of 28 appearances, 21 in the league, one in the cup, and six in Europe.

The 2010–11 season started well for Makos. He impressed in the away victory against Dundee United for the Europa League play-offs, as well as making good appearances in the pre-season friendlies. Makos continued his fine form throughout the regular season, cementing his place in the AEK first team, and won applause from AEK fans for his passionate tireless displays. In a season mired with disappointing displays for the team, Makos was one of few players who escaped criticism from AEK fans. Overall, his performances were much-improved over his first season at AEK, which was largely deemed as mediocre. The season ended in success as Makos won his first ever piece of silverware, the 2010–11 Greek Cup.

Makos kicked off his third season in superb form, scoring his first ever goal for AEK Athens in the season opener in a 1–0 win against Ergotelis on 18 September 2011. Due to his impressive performances, Makos became a regular in the Greece national team and played against Israel, Romania, Croatia and Latvia strengthening his chances of getting called up to the final squad for UEFA Euro 2012 having missed out on the 2010 FIFA World Cup. On 8 May 2012, Makos scored his second goal for AEK against Panathinaikos in the Super League Greece play off in the 2–0 home win over their archrivals. At the end of his third season at AEK, Makos made 34 appearances in total, 28 in the league, one in the cup, and five in Europe.

=== 1860 Munich ===
On 9 July 2012 Makos signed a two-year deal with German side TSV 1860 München for the transfer fee thought to be in the region of €465,000. The German side announced the signing through website, while also shedding light on the finances of the transfer. AEK are set to receive a reported €465,000. However, Makos will receive €165,000 of that sum as a result of unpaid wages dating back to the start of last season. Makos, 25, was presented to the media on Tuesday as the 2. Bundesliga side finally put end to speculation of a Munich move for Makos that dated back to last month. The German side were also interested in Makos' services back when the Greek international was part of Panionios. TSV 1860 München, yet another cash-strapped club, were keen to bringing Makos to Germany during the summer of 2009 but were beaten by AEK in a bidding war for Makos' services.

In 1860 Munich Makos met his former teammate in AEK Athens, Ismael Blanco. He was given the number 21. He made 11 goalless appearances for 2.Bundesliga.

=== Anorthosis Famagusta ===
On 5 July 2013, Grigoris Makos signed a two-year contract with Anorthosis. According to the Cypriot press, Makos' verbal agreement with Anorthosis is based on a salary of €100,000 per season but will only come to fruition should a deal between the two clubs be finalized. Anorthosis are scheduled to compete in the UEFA Europa League 2nd Qualifying Round. Makos, who has signed a two-year deal, has become the second high-profile Greek to join the club since Traianos Dellas linked up with the then Cypriot champions back in 2008, helping them reach the group stages of the Champions League. "This is an excellent opportunity for me because my confidence has returned especially with the new coach", he told the club's official website. "He [coach Christakis Kassianos] has put his trust in me. I am sure I will return to my best here. I will give my all to help the team in the Europa League and then win my place back in the Greek national team". On 16 May 2015, he scored his first goal with the club, in a 3–1 home win against Apollon Limassol for the Cypriot First Division.

At the end of 2014/15 season, Grigoris Makos seem to wish to return to Greece for personal reasons, but did not close the door to Anorthosis. The management of the club will submit a formal proposal and will make the effort to keep him although it is not easy.

=== Panetolikos ===
On 3 July 2015, Makos signed a two-year contract with Panetolikos F.C. From the very beginning he became a leader midfielder for the club. On 3 December 2016, he scored his first goal with the club in a 1–1 away draw against Veria. On 18 January 2017, after an excellent match at Agrinio, Panetolikos won 3–2 AEK, with the international defensive midfielder scoring a brace, for first time in his career, against his former club. At the end of the 2016–17 season, he settled his contract with the club.

=== Trikala ===
On 14 January 2018, after six months as a free agent, Makos signed a contract with Football League club Trikala F.C.

=== Kallithea ===
Makos joined Gamma Ethniki club Kallithea FC on 21 September 2018. On 30 January 2019 it was announced, that Makos had left the club.

=== Kalamata ===
Makos was a free agent for six months, then joined Gamma Ethniki club Kalamata on 15 July 2019 on a year contract for an undisclosed fee.

== International career ==
=== Greece Under 21 ===
Soon after becoming a regular and captain at Panionios, Makos was called up to the Greece U21 national squad and was made captain not long after his debut. After 17 appearances for the Under-21 side, he was called up to the senior side by Greece coach Otto Rehhagel.

=== Greece ===
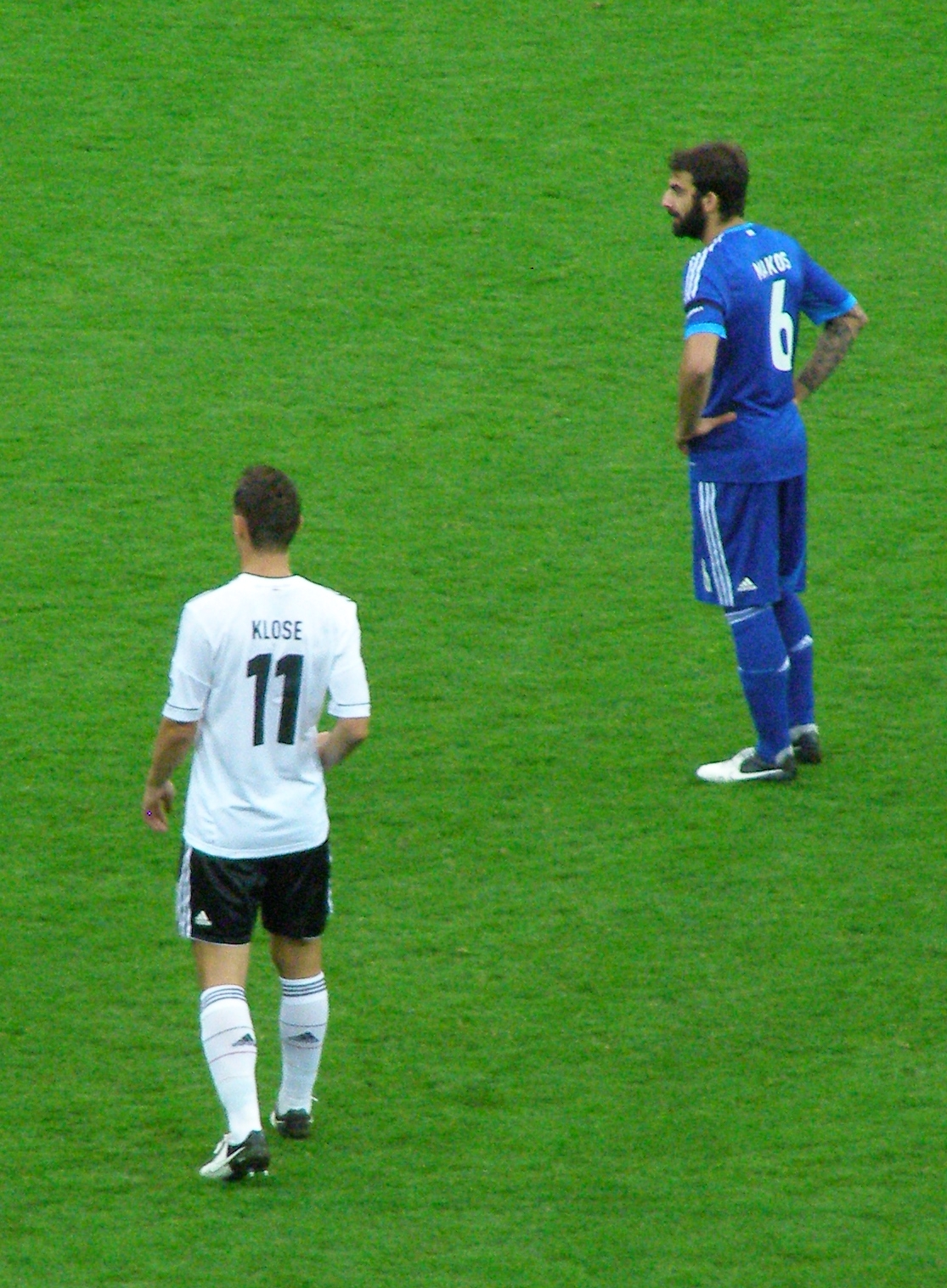
Makos, here with Miroslav Klose, during Euro 2012 (22 June 2012)

Makos was called up to the Greece national team on 1 February 2008 and made his debut on 5 February 2008 in a friendly against Czech Republic, he earned his second cap versus Cyprus on 19 May 2008. On 9 November, Makos was called up for the 2010 FIFA World Cup qualifiers matches against Ukraine, however Makos did not feature in any of the legs. On 28 February, Makos was called up for the World Cup preparation friendly against Senegal, he came on as a second-half substitute and made his first appearance for the national team in over a year On 11 May, Makos was named in Rehhagel's 30-man provisional World Cup squad for the 2010 FIFA World Cup but did not make the final 23-man squad.

He became a regular choice of new coach Fernando Santos on the Greece national football team during the latter stages of the UEFA Euro 2012 qualifying. On 19 May 2012, Makos was called up to the 23-man Greece squad for UEFA Euro 2012, in Poland and Ukraine. Makos made his debut in the tournament against Russia the coming on as a substitute in a Euro 2012 group stage match for captain Giorgos Karagounis playing 24 minutes of the match as he helped Greece keep a 1–0 win against Russia to finish second in the group and set up a quarter finals match against Germany where Makos started the game making it his second appearance in the tournament but Greece failed to surpass the Germans.

== Career statistics ==
=== Club ===
Correct as of 25 May 2018

Club performance			League		Cup		Continental		Total	
Season	Club	League	Apps	Goals	Apps	Goals	Apps	Goals	Apps	Goals
Greece			League		Greek Cup		Europe		Total	
2003–04	Panionios	Super League Greece	1	0	0	0	0	0	1	0
2004–05	Panionios	Super League Greece	24	0	4	0	4	0	32	0
2005–06	Panionios	Super League Greece	23	3	2	0	0	0	25	3
2006–07	Panionios	Super League Greece	27	1	2	0	0	0	29	1
2007–08	Panionios	Super League Greece	27	0	2	0	5	1	34	1
2008–09	Panionios	Super League Greece	28	1	4	0	3	0	35	1
2009–10	AEK Athens	Super League Greece	21	0	1	0	6	0	28	0
2010–11	AEK Athens	Super League Greece	26	0	7	0	7	0	40	0
2011–12	AEK Athens	Super League Greece	28	2	1	0	5	0	34	2
Germany			League		DFB-Pokal		Europe		Total	
2012–13	1860 München	2. Bundesliga	11	0	1	0	0	0	12	0
Cyprus			Cyprus First Division		Cypriot Cup		Europe		Total	
2013–14	Anorthosis Famagusta F.C.	Cyprus First Division	24	0	2	0	2	0	28	0
2014–15	Anorthosis Famagusta F.C.	Cyprus First Division	27	1	3	0	0	0	30	1
Greece			Super League		Greek Football Cup		Europe		Total	
2015–16	Panetolikos	Super League Greece	28	0	1	0	0	0	29	0
2016–17	Panetolikos	Super League Greece	24	3	3	0	0	0	27	3
2017–18	Trikala	Football League	19	0	0	0	0	0	19	0
Career total			338	11	33	0	32	1	403	12

=== International ===
Greece national team
Year	Apps	Goals
2008	2	0
2010	2	0
2011	6	0
2012	3	0
Total	13	0

Last updated: 3 July 2012
Source: Grigoris Makos at National-Football-Teams.com

== Honours ==
AEK Athens

- Greek Cup: 2010–11
