= Michael Koukoulakis =

Greek football referee

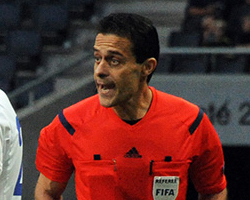
- Full name: Michail Koukoulakis
- Born: June 25, 1975 (age 51); Heraklion, Greece

Domestic
Years	League	Role
2003–2016	Super League Greece	Referee

International
Years	League	Role
2008–2015	FIFA listed	Referee

Michael Koukoulakis (Greek: Μιχάλης Κουκουλάκης; born 25 June 1975 in Heraklion) is a Greek football referee. He belongs to the Heraklion association. He has been an international referee for FIFA since 2008.

Koukoulakis has served as a referee for international competitions, including UEFA Euro 2012 qualification and the 2010 and 2014 World Cup qualifiers.
