= Ignacio Scocco =

Argentine footballer

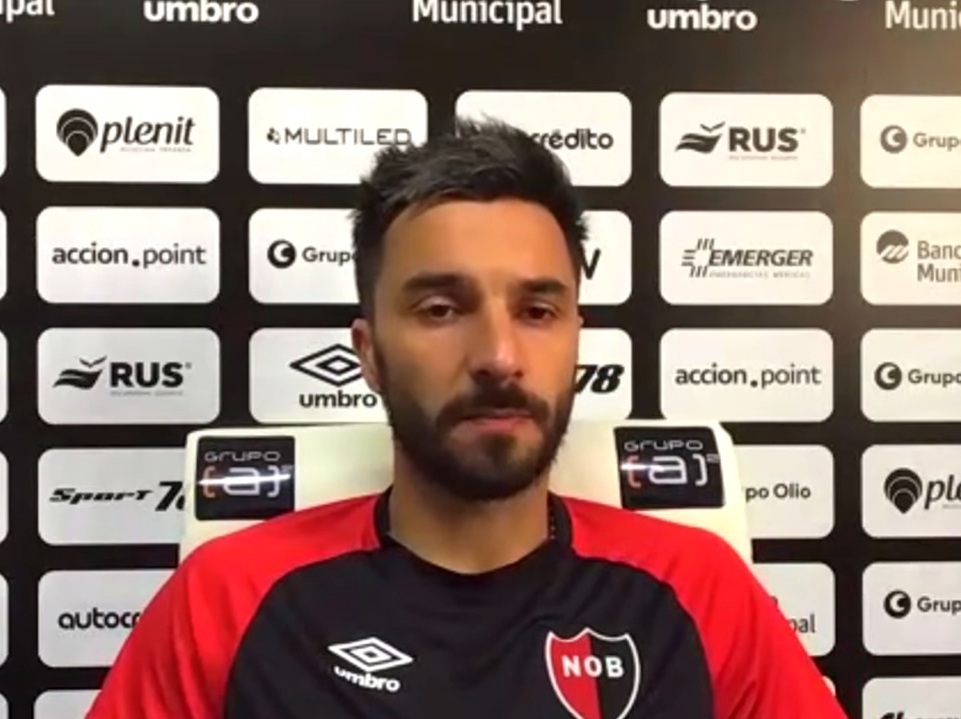
- Scocco in 2021

Personal information
- Full name: Ignacio Martín Scocco
- Date of birth: 29 May 1985 (age 41)
- Place of birth: Hughes, Santa Fe, Argentina
- Height: 1.72 m (5 ft 8 in)
- Position: Forward

Senior career*
Years	Team	Apps	(Gls)
2003–2006	Newell's Old Boys	76	(16)
2006–2008	UNAM	53	(18)
2008–2011	AEK Athens	89	(26)
2011–2013	Al Ain	19	(9)
2012–2013	→ Newell's Old Boys (loan)	33	(24)
2013–2014	Internacional	17	(3)
2014	Sunderland	6	(0)
2014–2017	Newell's Old Boys	74	(24)
2017–2020	River Plate	52	(20)
2020–2021	Newell's Old Boys	19	(4)
Total		438	(144)

International career^{‡}
2004–2006	Argentina U20	12	(3)
2012	Argentina	1	(2)
- * Club domestic league appearances and goals as of 2 August 2021 ‡ National team caps and goals as of 22 November 2012

Ignacio Martín Scocco, (Spanish pronunciation: [iɣˈnasjo esˈkoko]; born 29 May 1985) better known as Nacho Scocco is an Argentine retired professional footballer who last played as a forward for Newell's Old Boys. He has also played for clubs in Mexico, Greece, the United Arab Emirates, England and Brazil.

== Club career ==
=== Newell's Old Boys ===
The Newell's Old Boys youth program quickly picked this young man up, and he was just nineteen when he made his debut in the Argentine top flight against San Lorenzo. He scored 17 goals in 75 games and played alongside players such as Fernando Belluschi and Ariel Ortega in the championship winning team of Apertura 2004. He also scored a very important goal for Newell's Old Boys against Boca Juniors scoring in the 82nd minute putting his club 1–0 up. In the summer of 2006 Scocco signed for Pumas UNAM for a fee of $3.5m, but stated to the newspaper «Reforma» that one day he would return to Newell's Old Boys.

"El Tucán", was a regular fixture in the Newell's Old Boys setup, and during the Clausura 2006 season he scored nine goals in 18 games, but better was to come in the 2006 edition of the Libertadores where Newell's reached the knockout stage. Scocco's four goals in just five starts were crucial to their campaign. Scocco wore the number 32 in the famous red and black shirts.

When Ricardo "Tuca" Ferretti took over Pumas UNAM, and his main strikers Joaquín Botero and Bruno Marioni left he was willing to sign Scocco for $3.5m.

=== Club Universidad Nacional ===
In 2006, Scocco joined Mexican side Pumas for $3.5 million. He made his debut against Chiapas, and during his second appearance against Veracruz he scored his first goal, from the goal kick. Scocco also scored a hat-trick for Pumas against Querétaro. Scocco scored his last goal for Pumas UNAM against Veracruz, gaining Pumas UNAM 4–2. Scocco was a mainstay in the Pumas starting team, his strike partner was Esteban Solari. Scocco ended his career at Pumas with 53 appearances and 18 goals.

Scocco reinforces the Deportivo Toluca borrowed from the Pumas UNAM order by Americo Gallego in the quarter-finals of the Copa Libertadores 2007.

=== AEK Athens ===
Scocco signed a three-year contract with AEK Athens on 18 June 2008. AEK Athens signed Scocco for a fee of €1.5 million, earning €400,000 per year. Scocco was the fourth Argentine player of the club, alongside Sebastián Saja, Agustín Pelletieri and Ismael Blanco. During his time at AEK, Scocco has been mostly used as a right winger and as an attacking midfielder, while sometimes he was also used as second striker, which was his preferred position.

Scocco also scored two goals past Olympiacos on 6 January 2010 and won AEK the away match 2–1 in the Karaiskakis Stadium. This performance and his remarkable 40-yard free-kick, which was his second goal earned him the MVP award. The following week he scored against Atromitos in 3–3 and at 31 January he scored the opener in the away derby against Panathinaikos, which ended 1–1. Scocco also scored a stunning goal against Panthrakikos and a free-kick against Panionios one minute before the end of the match making the score 1–1.

On 16 September 2010, Scocco scored the third and final goal on AEK's first European match against Hajduk Split in a 3–1 home win. This was the first goal of the season for Scocco. Three days later Scocco scored with a 30-yard shot against Asteras Tripolis. On 17 October 2010, Scocco scored a 40-yard strike against Aris, and followed up with a second goal for a 4–0 away victory. On 25 November 2010, Scocco renewed his contract with AEK signing a new three-year deal which would keep him at the club until 2013. Scocco's contract was worth €3.6 million, earning €1 million per year and a buy-out clause worth €3 million for foreign teams On 18 May 2011, Scocco scored a 38-yard shot against PAOK for AEK to take the lead in a 2–1 away defeat. Due to financial problems, AEK Athens had to sell Scocco (cheaper than his buy-out clause, if necessary), to relieve itself of his expensive contract.

=== Al Ain ===
In June 2011, Scocco joined Al Ain for €2.8 million signing a contract worth €4.8 million per season plus a €1 million bonus if Al Ain win the UAE Championship. In the 2011-12 season, Al Ain won the championship and later he left UAE by not signing a new contract deal due to family reasons. In August 2011, Scocco was loaned to Newell's Old Boys, and returned to Argentina and his family after a six-year absence from his home country.

=== Return to Argentina and Newell's ===
Scocco returned to his homeland, Argentina, to join Newell's Old Boys, his first professional team, as well as other Argentine stars such as Gabriel Heinze and Maxi Rodríguez. Newell's finished second in the Championship, and as a result entered the Copa Libertadores next season. Scocco played an important role for his team, scoring 13 goals and became the top scorer of the league alongside Facundo Ferreyra of Vélez Sársfield. During the season Newells rejected a €3 million offer from Fenerbahçe considering the offer too low, having set Scocco 7m buy out clause. His impressive performances in Argentine Primera División, Copa Libertadores and his two-goal debut in the national team against Brazil attracted the interest of Atlético Madrid.

Scocco also led his team to win the 2013 Torneo Final championship and proceed to the Final of the Argentine Primera División against the 2012 Torneo Inicial winners, Vélez Sársfield, the team who deprived Newell's of the first place. Scocco scored 11 goals for his team and retained his position as top scorer of the Championship in 2013 season, sharing his position, this time with Emanuel Gigliotti of Colón. On 30 June, Newell's lost 1–0 on the final of the Championship although dominating in all the duration of the match. Newell's reached 2013 Copa Libertadores semi final, that they were eliminated by Ronaldinho's Atlético Mineiro in a penalty shootout (2–0 loss in the real time, in a 2–2 aggregate followed by the Newell's 2–0 victory on the first leg). Scocco scored six goals in the tournament and finished second scorer alongside Diego Tardelli, behind Jô.

=== Internacional ===
On 1 July 2013, Scocco joined Internacional for €4.25 million rejecting the offer from São Paulo. On 15 August, Scocco scored two goals in a minute against Botafogo in a 3–3 draw.

=== Sunderland ===
On 30 January 2014, Sunderland completed the transfer of Scocco for €3.65 million, signing a two-and-a-half-year deal, as one of Gus Poyet's four transfer window signings. Asked about Scocco in April, South American football expert Tim Vickery wrote in his weekly BBC Sport column: "He might not be a big target man centre-forward, but he has some penalty area presence and moves outside the area with fluidity and intelligence." Although Sunderland avoided relegation, Scocco failed to score in eight appearances, all of which came from the bench. He was an unused substitute as the side lost the 2014 Football League Cup Final 3–1 to Manchester City on 2 March.

On 23 July 2014, Sunderland confirmed his departure back to Argentina, returning for his third spell with Newell's Old Boys.

=== Newell's Old Boys, third spell ===
On 13 July 2014, Scocco joined Newell's Old Boys for €2.7 million, on a five years' contract. On his presentation at Estadio Marcelo Bielsa, 7,000 fans were gathered in the stadium. He was given his favourite number, "32".

After the 2014–15 season, Scocco's future at Newell's Old Boys was in doubt, and he was linked with a return to AEK Athens. Eventually, despite the improved offer by AEK, Nacho Scocco has decided to stay at Newell's Old Boys.

In June 2017, Scocco was again linked with a return to AEK Athens. Newell's Old Boys was dealing with financial problems, leaving the 32-year old unpaid for over five months.

He left the club after 155 appearances (67 goals, 13 assists) in all competitions.

=== River Plate ===
On 29 June 2017, Scocco chose River Plate as his next destination, signing a three-year contract for a transfer fee of $3,000,000. The transfer procedures lasted for days, as Judge Fabián Bellizia, who runs the Newell's trust, rejected River Plate's first offer of $1,800,000. Despite an initial offer of $2,600,000 from Independiente and the loan of Lucas Albertengo being rejected, Scocco insisted to play in the Monumental. The manager of River Plate wanted to have Scocco as soon as possible, as he would replace Sebastián Driussi, who had joined Zenit Saint Petersburg for €20 million. On 4 July 2017, he made his debut in the club as a starter in a 2–0 away win against Guarani in the 2017 Copa Libertadores. On 21 September 2017, he scored five goals for River Plate in their 8–0 comeback home 2017 Copa Libertadores quarterfinals win against Bolivian side Jorge Wilstermann. On 8 October, Scocco continued to impress, scoring two goals in three minutes in a 3–0 victory over Defensa y Justicia in the Copa Argentina. In total, in eleven appearances with the club, he has scored eleven goals and had one assist. On 1 November 2017, in the Copa Libertadores semifinals games against rivals Lanús was the key scorer in both games, but was not enough to avoid the exclusion from the final.

On 9 December 2017, in the 2017 Copa Argentina Final he opened the score in the 2–1 win game against Atlético Tucumán. On 4 February 2018, Scocco scored a wonderful goal in a 2–0 home win game against Club Olimpo. 'Nacho' received the ball in the centre of the field, swivelled around and with 8 touches ran more than half the length of the field, dribbling past five outfield players before he left goalkeeper Jorge Carranza on his backside with a feint, and slotted the ball into the net. Fans claimed that was the best goal of the last decade in international football.

On 14 March 2018, Scocco (69') scored two minutes after his entrance in the game, sealing River Plate's 2–0 win against rivals Boca Juniors in the 2017 Supercopa Argentina game played at Estadio Malvinas Argentinas in Mendoza. On 19 March 2018, he scored a brace in a 3–1 home win game against Belgrano. On 23 September 2018, he scored in a 2–0 away derby against rivals Boca Juniors. Scocco helped his club to reach 2018 Copa Libertadores final, but an injury to the right calf, will definitely be left out of the first final, on 10 November 2018, of the Copa Libertadores against Boca Juniors at Bombonera. Scocco's injury occurred in the first half of the game that River lost against Estudiantes 1–0 in the Superliga. River Plate's coach Marcelo Gallardo's idea is to preserve him so that he gets in good condition for the rematch, on Saturday the 24th.

Scocco began the 2019-20 season as a substitute of Rafael Santos Borré, but he succeeded to have four goals in the league this year, and has struggled as a replacement for most of the Copa Libertadores games on a path that brings River Plate to the 2019 Copa Libertadores final for the second consecutive season, this time against Flamengo.

=== Newell's final spell ===
After the end of his contract with River Plate at 1 July, Scocco returned once again to Newell's in order to end his career at his childhood club. At 35 years of age, a club legend, Newell's announced his return with an instagram post with his 32-numbered shirt with the description "Nacho is back! The heart rules and Scocco knows it. Happy that you are in your place again. Welcome to the Park!". On 13 December he announced that he would retire from professional football after the end of year.

== International career ==
=== Argentina Under-20 ===
Scocco started his youth international career in 2004, Scocco has had 12 appearances and scored three goals, he made his debut against Colombia on 27 July 2004. On 3 November 2004, Scocco made his second appearance against Paraguay and scored in the 77th minute making Argentina 2–0 up. Scocco was also called up to be part of the 2005 FIFA World Youth Championship. Scocco played two matches in the tournament against Uzbekistan on 1 December 2005 and against Mali on 4 December 2005. Scocco also played alongside Lionel Messi and Sergio Agüero.

=== Argentina ===
On 15 April 2005, José Pekerman called up Scocco for a friendly against Chile but didn't make an appearance. On 3 June 2005, Scocco was called up for another friendly for Argentina against Puerto Rico, but pulled a hamstring and was forced out for a couple of weeks and was not included in the match.

After impressing Argentine coach Alfio Basile, Scocco was called up for an unofficial friendly match against Guatemala on 6 February 2008, Scocco played 20 minutes in the match and came on for Ezequiel Lavezzi. Scocco was also included in the 21 man squad against Venezuela on 20 August 2008.

Scocco was included in the squad for the 2012 Superclásico de las Américas. He made his debut on the senior team playing the second leg, scoring two goals and also his penalty at the penalty shootout.

=== International goals ===
Scores and results list Argentina's goal tally first, score column indicates score after each Scocco goal.

List of international goals scored by Ignacio Scocco
No.	Date	Venue	Opponent	Score	Result	Competition
1	21 November 2012	La Bombonera, Buenos Aires, Argentina	Brazil	1–0	2–1 (3–4 p)	2012 Superclásico de las Américas
2	21 November 2012	La Bombonera, Buenos Aires, Argentina	Brazil	2–1	2–1 (3–4 p)	2012 Superclásico de las Américas

== Honours ==
Newell's Old Boys

- Primera División: 2004 Apertura, 2013 Final

AEK Athens

- Greek Cup: 2010–11

Al Ain

- UAE Pro-League: 2011–12

Sunderland

- Football League Cup runner-up: 2013–14

River Plate

- Copa Argentina: 2017, 2019
- Supercopa Argentina: 2017
- Copa Libertadores: 2018
- Recopa Sudamericana: 2019

Individual

- Top scorer of Primera División Argentina: 2012–13, 2013–14
- Awards Nova Super League Team of the year: 2009–10
