= Ismael Blanco =

Argentine footballer (born 1983)

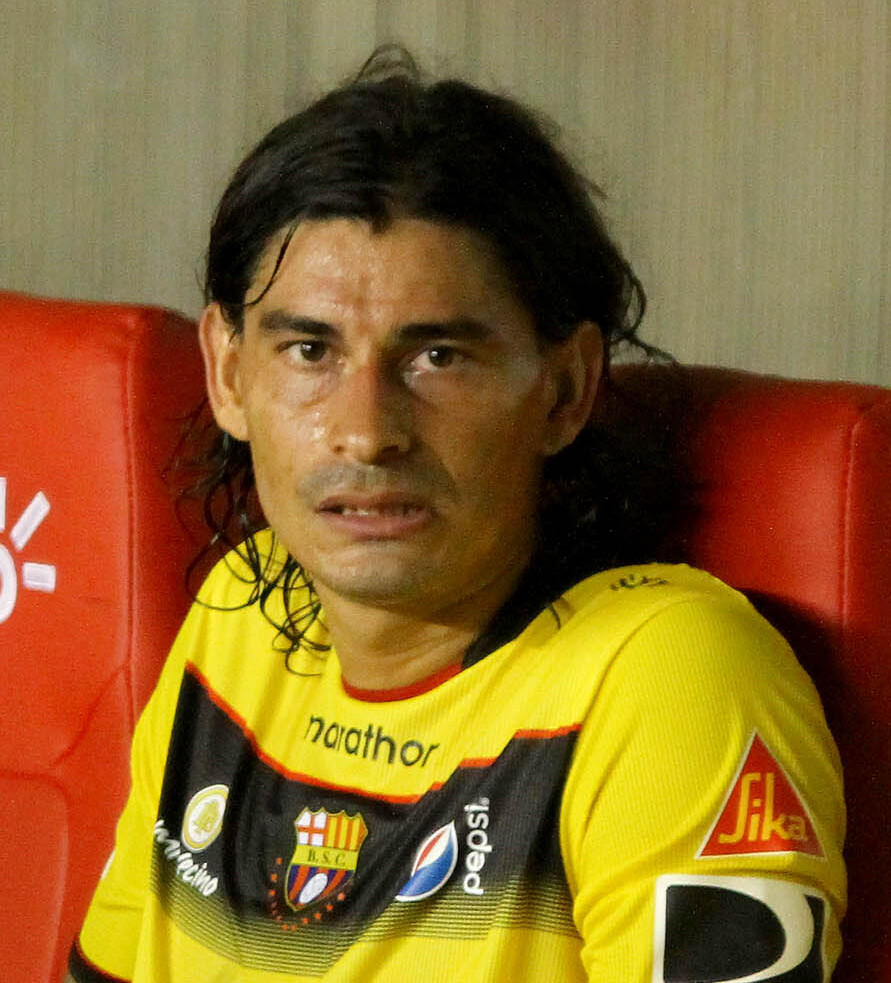
- Blanco with Barcelona SC in 2015

Personal information
- Full name: Ismael Alfonso Blanco
- Date of birth: 19 January 1983 (age 43)
- Place of birth: Santa Elena, Argentina
- Height: 1.78 m (5 ft 10 in)
- Position: Forward

Senior career*
Years	Team	Apps	(Gls)
2002–2007	Colón	52	(13)
2005	→ Libertad (loan)	21	(7)
2005–2007	→ Olimpo (loan)	62	(33)
2007–2008	→ AEK Athens (loan)	34	(20)
2008–2011	AEK Athens	95	(35)
2011–2012	San Luis	13	(2)
2012	→ Legia Warsaw (loan)	10	(2)
2012–2013	1860 Munich	15	(2)
2013	→ Lanús (loan)	16	(5)
2013–2014	Lanús	40	(6)
2014–2016	Barcelona SC	81	(29)
2016–2017	Colón	22	(6)
2017–2018	Atlético Tucumán	22	(3)
2018–2019	Club Atlético Mitre	30	(7)
2020	Egaleo	2	(0)
2020–2021	Panarkadikos	5	(1)
2021–2022	Ialysos	7	(5)
2022	Ciudad de Bolívar	16	(2)
2024	Unión de Sunchales	10	(2)

Managerial career
- 2026: Técnico Universitario
- * Club domestic league appearances and goals

Ismael Blanco (born 19 January 1983) is an Argentine football manager and former player who played as a forward.

== Club career ==
=== Argentina ===
Blanco started his career with Colón in 2002. He suffered a serious knee injury (cruciate ligament) in 2004.

Having lost his place on the first team, after his rehabilitation he was loaned out in January 2005 to Club Libertad of Paraguay, where he had the opportunity to participate in the Copa Libertadores 2005, scoring twice during his team's unsuccessful effort in Group 1.

After his loan spell in Club Libertad, he returned in June 2005 to Argentina, to play on loan for Olimpo de Bahía Blanca, a Primera B Nacional team. During his stay there he managed to score 46 times in 90 games, helping his team win the Primera B Nacional and the promotion to Primera División and being the top scorer in both the Apertura 2006 (18 goals) and the Clausura 2007 (11 goals). In the summer of 2007, he rejoined Colón.

=== AEK Athens ===
He did not stay with Colon for long; on 10 August 2007, Blanco joined AEK Athens on loan. He got his first appearance in a UEFA Cup match against Red Bull Salzburg on 20 September 2007. He then debuted in Super League Greece against Atromitos and scored twice leading AEK Athens to a 2–0 win. Blanco's first goal in a European competition occurred on 13 February 2007 against Getafe with a back flick in the 94th minute to end the game as a 1–1 draw. Blanco finished top scorer in the 2007–08 Super League Greece having scored 19 goals in 28 games (he scored once more during his six playoff apps). His performances led AEK Athens to announce the activation of the clause in his contract on 28 April 2008.

Blanco started his second season in AEK scoring the winning goal via a penalty against Panathinaikos in the year's first derby match. Blanco also stated to the press that he does not want to leave AEK and wants to be playing for many years in Greece. Blanco scored his first Greek Cup goal against Chaidari. Blanco finished top scorer in the 2008–09 Super League Greece having scored 14 goals in 30 games (plus three goals at six playoff games). Blanco's third season at AEK wasn't as successful as the previous years as he scored only 13 goals all season, (eight in the league, four in Europe, and one in playoffs). In his fourth season, he scored 15 goals in all competitions. His first goals came in the 5–1 win against Panthrakikos F.C. for the Greek Cup, in which Blanco scored his first hat-trick. He scored also a game-winner against arch-rivals Olympiakos in the 90th minute (he came into the game as a substitution).

Blanco decided not to renew his contract with AEK and not to accept the proposal of AEK and he was released to a free agent. Blanco promised that if ever returned to Greece that would be only to wear AEK Athens' colours.

=== San Luis ===
On 18 August 2011, Blanco was signed by Mexican club San Luis. He managed to score two goals in 15 appearances for the Mexican League.

=== Legia Warsaw ===
On 24 February 2012, Blanco was signed by Polish club Legia Warsaw until 30 June 2012 with an option of extending to another season. Legia managed to win the Polish Cup of that season. He was released on 15 May 2012 as he did not fulfil the club's expectations, having only scored two goals in the Polish Cup.

=== 1860 Munich ===
After leaving Legia Warsaw, Blanco signed for TSV 1860 Munich, as well as his former teammate at AEK Athens, Grigoris Makos. He did not fulfill the expectations of the club, not finding the net in 13 caps for the 2. Bundesliga.

=== Return to South America ===
In February 2013, Blanco returned to his homeland, Argentina to join Lanús. He was given his favourite number, "18" On 16 June, Blanco scored twice against River Plate in a 5–1 victory. He scored five goals in 16 appearances for the 2013 Torneo Final and Lanús took the third place.

On 17 August 2014 Blanco signed a two years' contract for Barcelona SC an Ecuadorian sports club based in Guayaquil. The total amount of transfer is estimated to €2.9 million.

On 22 August 2016, he rejoined Colón.

On 11 August 2017, he joined Atlético Tucumán.

=== Egaleo ===
In January 2020, he joined Greek club Egaleo in the Football League, who compete in the Greek third tier. Blanco previously played for Club Atlético Mitre in the Argentine second division where he scored three goals in 11 matches last season. He did not renew his contract with the Argentine club and decided to return to Greece at the age of 37.

== Celebration ==
On 26 September 2007, in a match against Veria, after putting AEK Athens in front, Blanco revealed a Zorro mask from his sock and drew a big Z in the air celebrating the winning goal. He kept doing so from time to time though referees usually punished him with a yellow card. As a result, he gained the nickname "Zorro" by the fans.

== Personal life ==
Blanco is of Egyptian descent.

He is the oldest brother of Sebastián Blanco.

== Career statistics ==
Club	Season	League			National cup (Note: Includes Copa Argentina, Greek Football Cup, Polish Cup, DFB-Pokal)		Continental		Other		Total	
Club	Season	Division	Apps	Goals	Apps	Goals	Apps	Goals	Apps	Goals	Apps	Goals
Club Atlético Colón	2002–03	Argentine Primera División	19	5	1	1	0	0	0	0	20	6
Club Atlético Colón	2003–04	Argentine Primera División	14	3	0	0	0	0	0	0	14	3
Club Atlético Colón	2004–05	Argentine Primera División	16	3	2	1	0	0	0	0	18	4
Club Atlético Colón	Total		49	11	3	2	0	0	0	0	52	13
Libertad	2005	Paraguayan Primera División	15	5	–		6	2	–		21	7
Olimpo	2005–06	Argentine Primera División	24	5	0	0	–		–		24	5
Olimpo	2006–07	Primera Nacional	38	28	0	0	–		–		38	28
Olimpo	Total		62	33	0	0	–		–		62	33
AEK Athens	2007–08	Super League Greece	28	19	2	0	7 (Note: Appearances in UEFA Cup)	1	6 (Note: Appearances in Super League Greece play-offs)	1	43	21
AEK Athens	2008–09	Super League Greece	30	14	6	5	2	1	6	3	44	23
AEK Athens	2009–10	Super League Greece	29	8	1	0	8 (Note: Appearances in UEFA Europa League)	4	5	1	43	13
AEK Athens	2010–11	Super League Greece	22	9	7	4	7	2	3	0	39	15
AEK Athens	Total		109	50	16	9	24	8	20	5	169	72
San Luis	2011–12	Liga MX	15	2	0	0	–		–		15	2
Legia Warsaw	2011–12	Ekstraklasa	6	0	4	2	0	0	–		10	2
1860 Munich	2012–13	2. Bundesliga	13	0	2	2	–		–		15	2
Lanús	2012–13	Argentine Primera División	16	5	1	0	–		–		17	5
Lanús	2013–14	Argentine Primera División	26	4	0	0	14 (Note: Appearances in Copa Sudamericana)	2	–		40	6
Lanús	Total		42	9	1	0	14	2	–		57	11
Barcelona SC	2014	Ecuadorian Serie A	20	12	–		4	2	–		24	14
Barcelona SC	2015	Ecuadorian Serie A	42	14	–		6	0	–		48	14
Barcelona SC	2016	Ecuadorian Serie A	9	1	–		–		–		9	1
Barcelona SC	Total		71	27	–		10	2	–		81	29
Club Atlético Colón	2016–17	Argentine Primera División	22	6	0	0	–		–		22	6
Atlético Tucumán	2017–18	Argentine Primera División	17	2	3	1	2	0	–		22	3
Club Atlético Mitre	2018–19	Primera Nacional	30	7	1	0	–		–		31	7
Career total			478	160	29	16	56	14	20	5	584	187

== Honours ==
Olimpo

- Nacional B: 2006 Apertura, 2007 Clausura

AEK Athens

- Greek Cup: 2010–11

Legia Warsaw

- Polish Cup: 2011–12

Lanús

- Copa Sudamericana: 2013

Individual

- Nacional B top scorer: 2006 Apertura, 2007 Clausura
- Best foreign player of Greek Super League: 2007–08
- Super League Greece top scorer: 2007–08, 2008–09
- Greek Cup top scorer: 2008–09, 2010–11
