= Sebastián Saja =

Argentine footballer and coach

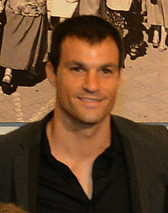
- Saja in 2014

Personal information
- Full name: Diego Sebástian Saja
- Date of birth: 5 June 1979 (age 47)
- Place of birth: La Plata, Argentina
- Height: 1.88 m (6 ft 2 in)
- Position: Goalkeeper

Team information
- Current team: Racing Club (director of football)

Senior career*
Years	Team	Apps	(Gls)
2000–2008	San Lorenzo	145	(11)
2003	→ Brescia (loan)	4	(0)
2004	→ Rayo Vallecano (loan)	20	(0)
2004	→ Club América (loan)	4	(0)
2005–2006	→ Córdoba (loan)	23	(0)
2007–2008	→ Grêmio (loan)	30	(1)
2008–2011	AEK Athens	95	(0)
2011–2016	Racing Club	169	(7)
2016	Gimnàstic	10	(0)
2017	Zaragoza	6	(0)
Total		500	(19)

International career
1997–1999	Argentina U20	24	(0)
2002–2003	Argentina	4	(0)

Managerial career
- 2017–2018: Guaraní
- 2018: Agropecuario
- 2019: Inter Miami (academy coach)
- 2020–2025: Inter Miami (assistant)
- * Club domestic league appearances and goals

Diego Sebastián Saja (born 5 June 1979) is an Argentine football manager and former player who is the director of football at Racing Club.

He spent most of his professional career with San Lorenzo, Racing Club and AEK Athens, being one of the most prolific goal-scoring goalkeepers in history. He represented four clubs in the Spanish Segunda División, and also competed in Italy, Mexico and Brazil.

== Club career ==
=== San Lorenzo ===
Born in La Plata, Buenos Aires Province, Saja had nearly 200 overall appearances for San Lorenzo de Almagro, being voted South America's best goalkeeper in 2002. In 2001, he helped the team win the Clausura and the Copa Mercosur, adding the following year's Copa Sudamericana.

Saja split the 2003–04 season with Brescia Calcio and Rayo Vallecano, being first-choice and dropping down a level with the latter. Moving to another club in Spain and in the second division for the following campaign, he would also be relegated with Córdoba CF.

After a brief spell in Mexico with Club América, Saja returned to San Lorenzo for 2005–06: he made 33 appearances and scored five goals in the Primera División, but was eventually sent out on loan for the fifth time, this time to Grêmio Foot-Ball Porto Alegrense after falling out of favour with new manager Ramón Díaz.

=== AEK ===
Released in 2008, Saja signed a three-year contract with AEK Athens, earning approximately €400.000. He appeared in 29 games in his first year to help his team finish fourth in the league, while they were quickly eliminated from UEFA Cup contention.

On 31 May 2009, Saja agreed to a new three-year deal with the Greek side, continuing to be first-choice and winning the Greek Cup in 2011.

=== Return to Argentina ===
On 29 June 2011, Saja and AEK agreed to terminate his contract one year before it expired. Shortly after, the 32-year-old returned to his homeland and joined Racing Club de Avellaneda, netting his first goal for his new team on 29 September of the following year, through a penalty against former club San Lorenzo in a 4–0 win; he was also the goalkeeper with the fewest goals conceded in the 2011 Apertura, breaking a club record for a short tournament held by Carlos Roa since 1992.

On 9 June 2013, again from the penalty spot, Saja scored against Boca Juniors (2–0 home triumph, which qualified the team for the Copa Sudamericana). On 18 October 2015, against the same opponent but for the league, he repeated the feat to help the hosts win it 3–1.

=== Gimnàstic and Zaragoza ===
On 16 August 2016, free agent Saja signed a one-year deal with Gimnàstic de Tarragona, returning to Spain and its second tier after 11 years. Due to the injury of Manolo Reina, he was made a starter during the first matches of the season.

On 21 December 2016, after being overtaken by another new signing, Stole Dimitrievski, Saja left Nàstic by mutual consent. The following 24 January, he joined fellow league team Real Zaragoza until the end of the campaign.

On 9 June 2017, Saja announced his retirement at the age of 38.

== International career ==
Saja earned four caps for Argentina, making his debut against Wales on 13 February 2002 (1–1 in Cardiff). In the following year he appeared in a further three friendlies, with Honduras (3–1), Mexico (1–0) and the United States (1–0).

== Honours ==
San Lorenzo

- Argentine Primera División: 2001 Clausura
- Copa Mercosur: 2001
- Copa Sudamericana: 2002

Grêmio

- Campeonato Gaúcho: 2007

AEK Athens

- Greek Cup: 2010–11

Racing Club

- Argentine Primera División: 2014

Individual

- Toulon Tournament best goalkeeper: 1999
- South American Goalkeeper of the Year: 2002
- Copa Libertadores best goalkeeper: 2007
