= 2008–09 AEK Athens F.C. season =

AEK Athens
2008–09 season
- Chairman: Demis Nikolaidis (until 1 December); Giorgos Kintis (until 3 February); Nikos Thanopoulos
- Manager: Georgios Donis (until 17 November); Dušan Bajević
- Stadium: Athens Olympic Stadium
- Super League: 3rd (After play-offs); 4th (Regular season)
- Greek Cup: Runners-up
- UEFA Cup: Second qualifying round
- Top goalscorer: League: Ismael Blanco (14); All: Ismael Blanco (23)
- Highest home attendance: 44,104 vs Olympiacos (1 February 2009)
- Lowest home attendance: 4,315 vs Kerkyra (22 January 2009)
- Average home league attendance: 15,704
- Biggest win: Panserraikos 1–5 AEK Athens
- Biggest defeat: AEK Athens 0–2 Panathinaikos; Olympiacos 2–0 AEK Athens
Home colours	Away colours	Third colours

The 2008–09 season was the 85th season in the existence of AEK Athens F.C. and the 50th consecutive season in the top flight of Greek football. They competed in the Super League, the Greek Cup and the UEFA Cup. The season began on 14 August 2008 and finished on 31 May 2009.

== Kits ==
Supplier: Puma
Sponsor(s): LG Corp
Features: Chevrolet, Diners Club

Home	Away	Third

== Overview ==
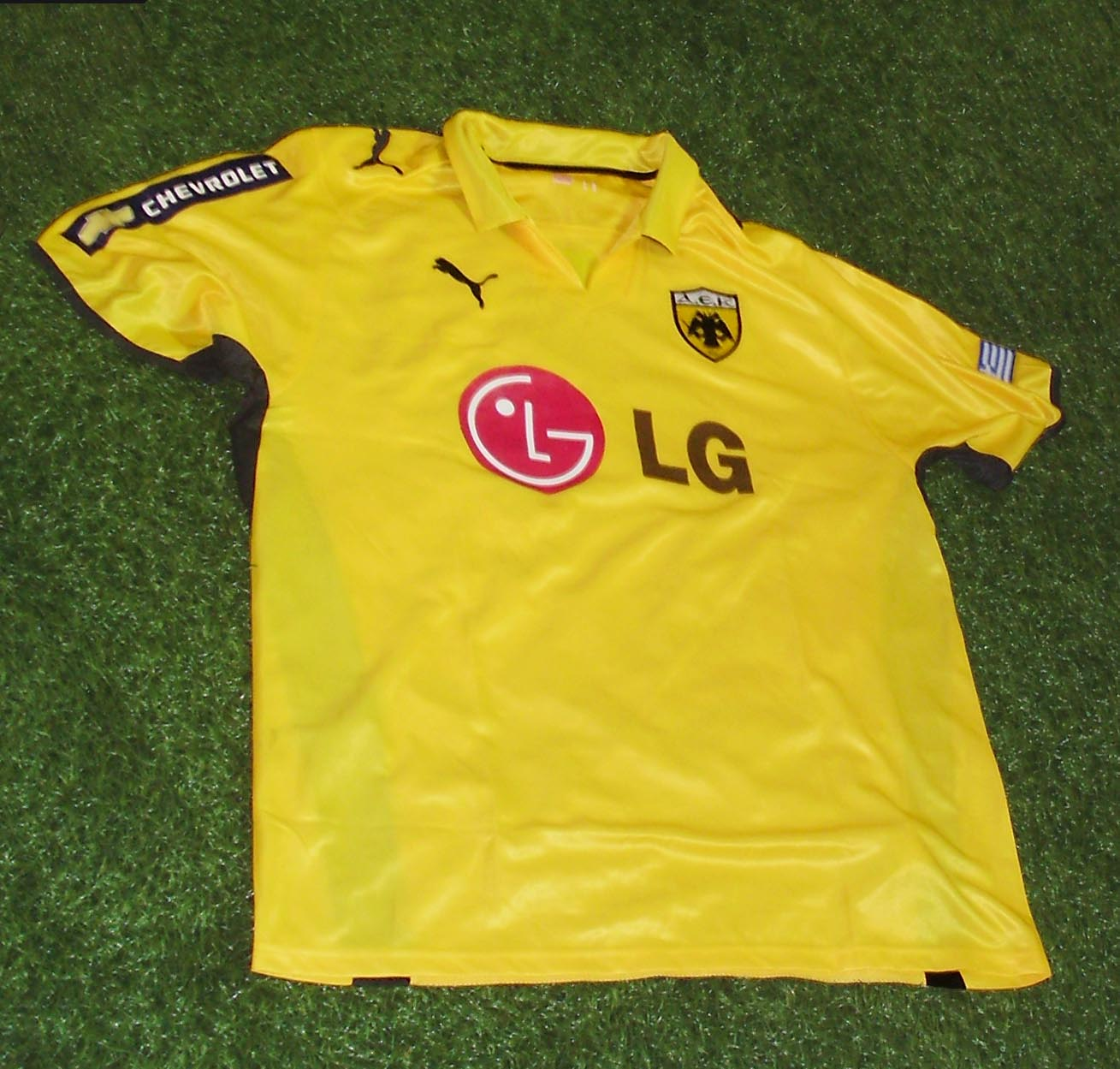
2008–09 Home kit

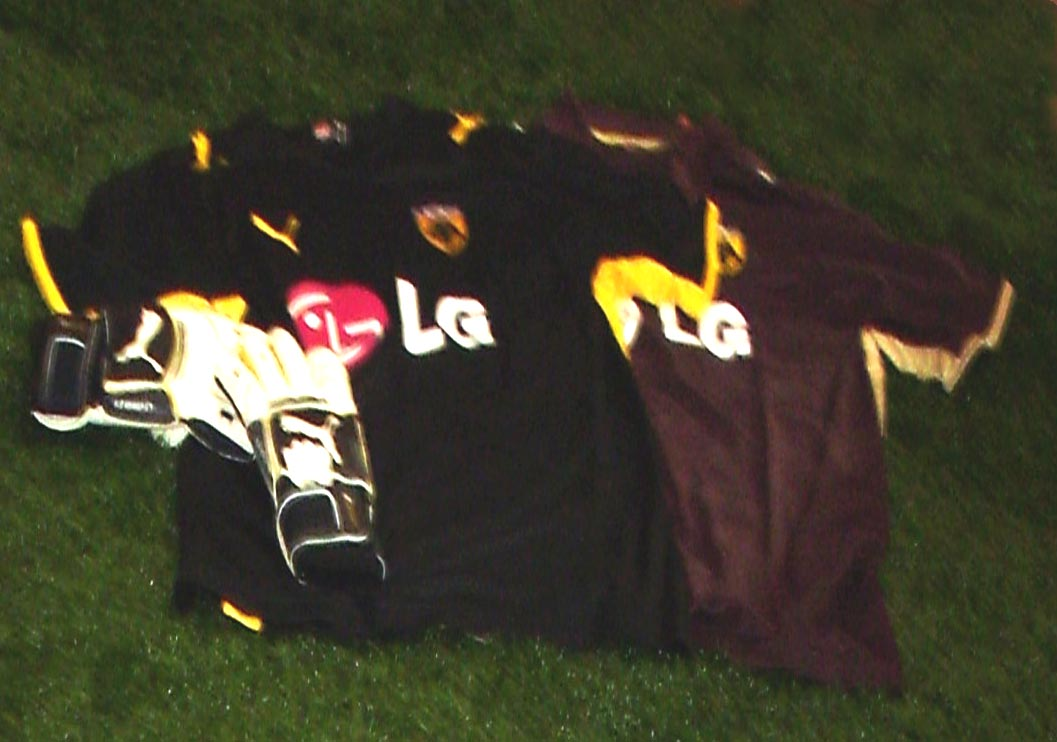
2008–09 Away and 3rd kit

A strange and ultimately unsuccessful season for AEK, who failed to handle the outcome of the previous season's Wallner case, mainly at the administrative level, but also at the financial level. The president, Demis Nikolaidis, decided to put his resignation at the disposal of the shareholders of the club, but he proceeded with fundamental changes in both the roster and the technical leadership of the team. He spent a lot of money, in order to change the balance in dressing room by essentially releasing the captains, Dellas and Liberopoulos and selling the talented Papastathopoulos to Genoa. He even proceeded with very expensive transfers for the club's standards, especially with that of Rafik Djebbour from Panionios, who spent the record amount of 3,200,000 euros. Alonsgside Djebbour, AEK also proceeded in the transfers of Kyrgiakos, Basinas, Majstorović, Saja, Pelletieri, Burns, Geraldo Alves and Juanfran, but the one who stood out was that of Ignacio Scocco, which was also the highest quality transfer during the Nikolaidis presidency. The most debatable choice of Nikolaidis was the hiring of Georgios Donis for the position of coach, since Donis had only worked with teams of a lower magnitude, where there wasn't the high pressure of the league race. The club sold 18,200 season tickets.

For the UEFA Cup, AEK were drawn with Cypriot Omonia and seemingly seemed the absolute favorite for the qualification. Donis, trying to change AEK's playing philosophy from the previous seasons, tried to implement an unattractive football model and very soon AEK paid the price. In Athens, Omonia, with a lucky goal towards the end of the first half, took the lead and finally got the victory against the unrecognizable and lazy AEK. AEK in the last match of Rivaldo, who in the following days surpisingly left for Bunyodkor from Uzbekistan, did not react at any point of the match, unable to produce phases and reduced to meaningless possession. The completely wrong approach and preparation of the match by Donis and his footballers made the task of AEK very difficult out of nowhere. The disaster for AEK was completed in the second leg at GSP Stadium, where spirited and tough Omonia limited them again, taking the lead in the score and despite being equalized by AEK did not lose control of the match, regaining the lead in the second half and only AEK managed to avoid the second defeat, equalizing at the end of the match. The disastrous exclusion from Europe effectively put AEK out of financial plans, which increased introversion and essentially forced Nikolaidis to leave earlier than the end of his presidency as he had informed the shareholders from the beginning of the summer.

AEK started the championship with a great victory, winning 2–1 against the newly rich Panathinaikos of the "multi-shareholder" era, but the continuation was disappointing. A series of 4 unsuccessful results brought Donis near to the exit door. On the 8th matchday amid heavy disapproval, AEK beat Asteras Tripolis with two goals in stoppage time at the Olympic Stadium and after the end of the match, Nikolaidis resigned implicitly attributing responsibilities to the ultras of the club. Donis was already fully exposed and the pressure appeared with yet another draw in Skoda Xanthi and along with a draw with Panserraikos at home, he resigned. The remaining management, Kanellopoulos and Koulis, believing that the team needed a great personality, hired Dušan Bajević, with the intention to turn him into general manager of AEK. The shareholders, after a final rift between them, decided to appoint Giorgos Kintis to the presidency, who immediately offered AEK a shop instead of one euro, as long as the prospective buyer took over the settled debts of the team, as well as the heavy opening of 15 million euros from the expensive transfer moves of the summer. No one appeared except for a written statement of intent by Dimitris Melissanidis and AEK continued with the internal upheavals being indescribable. Bajević had an indifferent season, which he also attributed to a lack of confidence in himself and was asking for big investments to be able to watch Olympiacos and Panathinaikos matches. Kintis, after a month and a half, being at a dead end and advocating a completely different philosophy from Bajević, resigned, Kanellopoulos resigned and left his shares to the Amateur AEK with Koulis following the same path. Nikos Thanopoulos, the chosen of the then major shareholder, Nikos Notias, took over as president after intense back-and-forth. And while the season was heading towards an unremarkable close, Bajević seemed to lack confidence in his players and was more concerned with management reshuffles than the team. So AEK ended the season with many draws, unattractive football and in fourth place behind Olympiacos, PAOK and Panathinaikos and without a competitive identity entered the play-offs with just one point, starting from a disadvantageous position .

The activities in the Cup started with a near exclusion from Ilisiakos who were left with 10 players and AEK taking the qualification in extra time. In the next phase against Kerkyra AEK were qualified with an amazing goal by Scocco in the 89th minute. In the quarter-finals, AEK's opponent was Skoda Xanthi, from who were lost 2–1 away, but managed to qualify thanks to a header from Blanco in the rematch. AEK easily qualified for the final after overcoming the obstacle of Panserraikos. The final that the club and the fans needed, especially against a great rival like Olympiacos, was ahead. On May 2, the best Cup final in the history of Greek football took place. AEK got off to a magical start, taking a 2–0 lead, thanks to two great goals from Blanco, but were leveled by goals from Derbyshire and Dudu. In the 90th minute, the class of Ignacio Scocco spoke, who passed everyone in front of him and perfectly shot past Nikopolidis. AEK, affected by the Argentine's superb goal, did not handle the stoppage time as needed and were leveled again by Derbyshire in the 96th minute. The game went to overtime, where AEK were shocked and conceded a fourth goal in the 102nd minute from Galletti. However, Ignacio Scocco in the 108th minute, again with a goal of rare beauty, equalized once more for AEK with the two teams going to the penalty shootout. So after 32 penalties and the score having reached the admirable 15–14, the final ended with the Olympiacos being crowned as the cup winner.

The play-offs started with ambition for AEK, who despite not winning the Cup, seemed determined to chase the position that led to the Champions League qualifiers. Indeed, until the last game AEK was the favorite along with Panathinaikos and the first place would be decided in the derby between them. Panathinaikos appeared more ready and determined and beat AEK by 0–2, which ended the season, without managing to return in the beficial qualifiers of the Champions League.

== Management team ==
Position	Staff
Manager	(Bosnia and Herzegovina) Dušan Bajević
Assistant manager	(Greece) Lysandros Georgamlis
Goalkeeping coach	(Serbia) Slobodan Šujica
Fitness coach	(Cyprus) Antonis Kezos
Fitness coach	(Greece) Dimitris Bouroutzikas
Technical director	(Netherlands) Eugène Gerards
Academy director	(North Macedonia) Toni Savevski
Academy manager	(Albania) Bledar Kola
U17 Manager	(Greece) Charis Kopitsis
Scout	(Netherlands) Eugène Gerards
Scout	(Greece) Kostas Tsanas
Scout	(Greece) Periklis Papapanagis
Head of Medical	(Greece) Lakis Nikolaou

== Players ==
=== Squad information ===
NOTE: The players are the ones that have been announced by the AEK Athens' press release. No edits should be made unless a player arrival or exit is announced. Updated 31 May 2009, 23:59 UTC+3.

No.	Player	Nat.	Position(s)	Date of birth (Age)	Signed	Previous club	Transfer fee	Contract until
Goalkeepers
23	Sebastián Saja	(Argentina)	GK	5 June 1979 (aged 30)	2008	(Argentina) San Lorenzo	Free	2012
77	Jürgen Macho	(Austria)	GK	24 August 1977 (aged 31)	2007	(Germany) Kaiserslautern	€300,000	2009
84	Giannis Arabatzis	(Greece)	GK	28 May 1984 (aged 25)	2002	(Greece) Enosi Apostolou Pavlou	€22,000	2011
Defenders
4	Geraldo Alves	(Portugal)	CB / RB	8 November 1980 (aged 28)	2007	(Portugal) Paços de Ferreira	€300,000	2010
5	Daniel Majstorović (Vice-captain 3)	(Sweden) (Serbia)	CB	5 April 1977 (aged 32)	2008	(Switzerland) Basel	Free	2011
6	Georgios Alexopoulos	(Greece)	CB / RB	7 February 1977 (aged 32)	2005	(Greece) Egaleo	Free	2010
7	Juanfran	(Spain)	LB / LM / CB	15 July 1976 (aged 32)	2008	(Spain) Real Zaragoza	Free	2010
12	Olivier N'Siabamfumu	(France) (Democratic Republic of the Congo)	CB / RB / DM	17 March 1986 (aged 23)	2009	Free agent	Free	2009
13	Dimitrios Koutromanos	(Greece)	RB / LB / DM	25 February 1987 (aged 22)	2009	(Greece) Panetolikos	€50,000	2011
25	Sotirios Kyrgiakos (Captain)	(Greece)	CB	23 July 1979 (aged 29)	2008	(Germany) Eintracht Frankfurt	Free	2013
31	Nikolaos Georgeas (Vice-captain 2)	(Greece)	RB / LB / DM	27 December 1976 (aged 32)	2001	(Greece) Kalamata	€1,500,000	2010
Midfielders
1	Pantelis Kafes (Vice-captain)	(Greece)	CM / DM / AM / RM / LM	24 June 1978 (aged 31)	2007	(Greece) Olympiacos	Free	2009
8	Tam Nsaliwa	(Canada) (Germany)	DM / CM / CB	28 January 1982 (aged 27)	2007	(Greece) Panionios	€400,000	2010
11	Gustavo Manduca	(Brazil)	RM / AM / RW / LM / LW / CM / SS / ST	8 June 1980 (aged 29)	2007	(Portugal) Benfica	€800,000	2010
16	Vasilios Pliatsikas	(Greece)	DM / CM / RB / CB	20 April 1988 (aged 21)	2005	(Greece) Chaidari	Free	2010
17	Antonis Rikka	(Greece) (France)	DM / CM	3 March 1986 (aged 23)	2008	(Greece) Skoda Xanthi	€600,000	2013
19	Panagiotis Lagos	(Greece)	LM / LW / LB / CM / DM	18 July 1985 (aged 23)	2006	(Greece) Iraklis	€900,000	2010
24	Agustín Pelletieri	(Argentina)	DM / CM	17 May 1982 (aged 27)	2008	(Argentina) Lanús	€700,000	2009
34	Panagiotis Tachtsidis	(Greece)	CM / DM / AM	15 February 1991 (aged 18)	2007	(Greece) AEK Athens U20	—	2010
56	Përparim Hetemaj	(Finland) (Serbia)	CM / DM / AM / RM / LM / RW / LW	12 December 1986 (aged 22)	2006	(Finland) HJK Helsinki	€450,000	2010
80	El Hadji Diouf	(Senegal)	AM / CM	20 August 1989 (aged 19)	2007	(Senegal) Xam-Xam	Free	2011
90	Savvas Gentsoglou	(Greece)	DM / CB / CM	19 September 1990 (aged 18)	2006	(Greece) AEK Athens U20	—	2013
Forwards
9	Edinho	(Portugal) (Guinea-Bissau)	ST / SS / RW	7 July 1982 (aged 26)	2008	(Portugal) Vitória de Setúbal	€350,000	2011
10	Rafik Djebbour	(Algeria) (France)	ST / SS / RW / LW	8 March 1984 (aged 25)	2008	(Greece) Panionios	€3,200,000	2011
18	Ismael Blanco	(Argentina)	ST / SS	19 January 1983 (aged 26)	2008	(Argentina) Colón	€850,000	2011
20	Nathan Burns	(Australia)	RW / SS / ST / LW / AM	7 May 1988 (aged 21)	2008	(Australia) Adelaide United	€450,000	2012
32	Ignacio Scocco	(Argentina) (Italy)	SS / LW / AM / ST / LM / RW / RM	29 May 1985 (aged 24)	2008	(Mexico) UNAM	€1,500,000	2011
83	Michalis Pavlis	(Greece)	SS / ST / RW / LW	22 September 1989 (aged 19)	2006	(Greece) AEK Athens U20	—	2011
Left during Summer Transfer Window
—	Rivaldo	(Brazil)	AM / SS / LM	19 April 1972 (aged 37)	2007	(Greece) Olympiacos	Free	2009
Left during Winter Transfer Window
2	Edson Ratinho	(Brazil)	RB / RM / RW	31 May 1986 (aged 23)	2007	(Brazil) Mogi Mirim	€350,000	2012
14	Angelos Basinas	(Greece)	DM / CM / AM	3 January 1976 (aged 33)	2008	(Spain) Mallorca	Free	2011
40	Panagiotis Zorbas	(Greece)	AM / RW / LM / LW / CM	21 April 1987 (aged 22)	2005	(Germany) Bayer 04 Leverkusen U19	Free	2011

== Transfers ==
=== In ===
==== Summer ====
No.	Pos.	Player	From	Fee	Date	Contract Until	Source
5	DF	(Sweden) Daniel Majstorović	(Switzerland) Basel	Free transfer	1 July 2008	30 June 2011	
7	DF	(Spain) Juanfran	(Spain) Real Zaragoza	Free transfer	30 July 2008	30 June 2010	
9	FW	(Portugal) Edinho	(Portugal) Vitória de Setúbal	€350,000	1 July 2008	30 June 2011	
10	FW	(Algeria) Rafik Djebbour	(Greece) Panionios	€3,200,000	30 August 2008	30 June 2011	
13	DF	(Greece) Dimitrios Koutromanos	(Greece) Anagennisi Karditsa	Loan return	1 July 2008	30 June 2011	
14	MF	(Greece) Angelos Basinas	(Spain) Mallorca	Free transfer	31 July 2008	30 June 2011	
17	MF	(Greece) Antonis Rikka	(Greece) Skoda Xanthi	€600,000	1 June 2008	30 June 2013	
18	FW	(Argentina) Ismael Blanco	(Argentina) Colón	€850,000	1 July 2008	30 June 2011	
20	FW	(Australia) Nathan Burns	(Australia) Adelaide United	€450,000	10 June 2008	30 June 2012	
23	GK	(Argentina) Sebastián Saja	(Argentina) San Lorenzo	Free transfer	1 July 2008	30 June 2012	
25	DF	(Greece) Sotirios Kyrgiakos	(Germany) Eintracht Frankfurt	Free transfer	1 August 2008	30 June 2013	
32	FW	(Argentina) Ignacio Scocco	(Mexico) UNAM	€1,500,000	18 June 2008	30 June 2011	
40	MF	(Greece) Panagiotis Zorbas	(Greece) Panetolikos	Loan return	1 July 2008	30 June 2011	
56	MF	(Finland) Përparim Hetemaj	(Greece) Apollon Kalamarias	Loan return	1 July 2008	30 June 2010	
80	GK	(Greece) Giannis Fysekis	(Greece) Lamia	Loan return	1 July 2008	30 June 2010	
90	MF	(Greece) Savvas Gentsoglou	(Greece) A.O. Nea Ionia	Loan return	1 July 2008	30 June 2011	
–	GK	(Italy) Stefano Sorrentino	(Spain) Recreativo de Huelva	Loan return	1 July 2008	30 June 2010	
—	DF	(Greece) Nikolaos Kourkoulas	(Greece) A.O. Nea Ionia	Loan return	1 July 2008	30 June 2010	
—	DF	(Greece) Panagiotis Stergiatos	(Greece) Anagennisi Karditsa	Loan return	1 July 2008	30 June 2008	
—	DF	(Greece) Nikos Barboudis	(Greece) Fostiras	Loan return	1 July 2008	30 June 2010	
—	DF	(Greece) Dimitrios Amarantidis	(Greece) Anagennisi Karditsa	Free transfer	1 July 2008	30 June 2010	
—	DF	(Greece) Vasilios Vallianos	(Greece) A.O. Nea Ionia	Loan return	1 July 2008	30 June 2008	
—	MF	(Greece) Nikolaos Kaltsas	(Greece) Acharnaikos	Loan return	1 July 2008	30 June 2010	
—	MF	(Greece) Manolis Tsagarogiannakis	(Greece) Thiva	Loan return	1 July 2008	30 June 2009	
—	MF	(Senegal) El Hadji Diouf	(Greece) Ilisiakos	Loan return	1 July 2008	30 June 2011	

==== Winter ====
No.	Pos.	Player	From	Fee	Date	Contract Until	Source
12	DF	(France) Olivier N'Siabamfumu	Free agent	Free transfer	11 February 2009	30 June 2009	
80	MF	(Senegal) El Hadji Diouf	(Greece) Anagennisi Karditsa	Loan termination	20 November 2008	30 June 2011	
—	MF	(Cyprus) Georgios Tofas	(Greece) Anagennisi Karditsa	Loan termination	31 December 2008	30 June 2010	

=== Out ===
==== Summer ====
No.	Pos.	Player	To	Fee	Date	Source
3	DF	(Argentina) Rodolfo Arruabarrena	(Argentina) Tigre	Contract termination	12 August 2008	
5	DF	(Greece) Traianos Dellas	(Cyprus) Anorthosis Famagusta	Contract termintion	24 July 2008	
7	FW	(Greece) Charilaos Pappas	(Greece) Skoda Xanthi	€60,000	5 July 2008	
9	FW	(Greece) Pantelis Kapetanos	(Romania) Steaua București	Contract termintion	8 July 2008	
10	MF	(Brazil) Rivaldo	(Uzbekistan) Bunyodkor	€1,000,000	27 August 2008	
14	DF	(Argentina) Federico Azcárate	(Spain) Polideportivo Ejido	End of contract	22 July 2008	
15	DF	(Greece) Sokratis Papastathopoulos	(Italy) Genoa	€3,800,000^{[a]}	1 August 2008	
16	MF	(Greece) Akis Zikos	Retired		30 June 2008	
18	FW	(Argentina) Ismael Blanco	(Argentina) Colón	Loan return	30 June 2008	
20	FW	(Portugal) Manú	(Portugal) Benfica	Loan return	30 June 2008	
22	MF	(Greece) Panagiotis Kone	(Greece) Iraklis	Contract termintion	29 August 2008	
23	FW	(Sierra Leone) Mohamed Kallon	(United Arab Emirates) Al Shabab	End of contract	1 July 2008	
27	MF	(Greece) Christos Bourbos	(Greece) Iraklis	End of contract	1 July 2008	
32	GK	(Brazil) Marcelo Moretto	(Portugal) Benfica	Loan return	30 June 2008	
33	FW	(Greece) Nikos Liberopoulos	(Germany) Eintracht Frankfurt	Contract termintion	13 July 2008	
36	FW	(Portugal) Edinho	(Portugal) Vitória de Setúbal	Loan return	30 June 2008	
88	MF	(Hungary) Dániel Tőzsér	(Belgium) Genk	€1,500,000	5 June 2008	
99	FW	(Brazil) Júlio César	(Romania) Rapid București	End of contract	1 July 2008	
—	DF	(Greece) Panagiotis Stergiatos	(Greece) Anagennisi Arta	End of contract	1 July 2008	
—	DF	(Greece) Vasilios Vallianos	(Greece) Panachaiki	Free transfer	1 July 2008	
—	MF	(Greece) Manolis Tsagarogiannakis	(Greece) Vyzas Megara	Free transfer	1 July 2008	

==== Winter ====
No.	Pos.	Player	To	Fee	Date	Source
2	DF	(Brazil) Edson Ratinho	(Brazil) Mogi Mirim	€350,000	27 January 2009	
14	MF	(Greece) Angelos Basinas	(England) Portsmouth	Contract termination	2 February 2009	

=== Loan in ===
==== Summer ====
No.	Pos.	Player	From	Fee	Date	Until	Option to buy	Source
24	MF	(Argentina) Agustín Pelletieri	(Argentina) Lanús	€700,000	1 September 2008	30 June 2009	✓	

=== Loan out ===
==== Summer ====
No.	Pos.	Player	To	Fee	Date	Until	Option to buy	Source
80	GK	(Greece) Giannis Fysekis	(Greece) Apollon Kalamarias	Free	1 July 2008	30 June 2009	✗	
—	GK	(Italy) Stefano Sorrentino	(Italy) Chievo Verona	€200,000	3 July 2008	30 June 2009	✓	
—	DF	(Greece) Nikolaos Kourkoulas	(Greece) A.O. Nea Ionia	Free	1 July 2008	30 June 2010	✗	
—	DF	(Greece) Nikos Barboudis	(Greece) Apollon Kalamarias	Free	23 July 2008	30 June 2009	✗	
—	DF	(Greece) Dimitrios Amarantidis	(Greece) Anagennisi Karditsa	Free	1 July 2008	30 June 2010	✗	
—	MF	(Greece) Nikolaos Kaltsas	(Greece) Chaidari	Free	1 July 2008	30 June 2010	✗	
—	MF	(Senegal) El Hadji Diouf	(Greece) Anagennisi Karditsa	Free	1 July 2008	30 June 2009	✗	
—	MF	(Cyprus) Georgios Tofas	(Greece) Anagennisi Karditsa	Free	1 July 2008	30 June 2009	✗	

==== Winter ====
No.	Pos.	Player	To	Fee	Date	Until	Option to buy	Source
40	MF	(Greece) Panagiotis Zorbas	(Greece) Panetolikos	Free	29 January 2009	30 June 2009	✗	
—	MF	(Cyprus) Georgios Tofas	(Cyprus) Anorthosis Famagusta	Free	31 December 2008	30 June 2010	✓	

Notes

a. plus 15% of next sale.

=== Contract renewals ===
No.	Pos.	Player	Date	Former Exp. Date	New Exp. Date	Source
13	DF	(Greece) Dimitris Koutromanos	25 June 2008	30 June 2010	30 June 2011	
90	MF	(Greece) Savvas Gentsoglou	25 June 2008	30 June 2009	30 June 2013	

=== Overall transfer activity ===
==== Expenditure ====
Summer: ▼€7,650,000

Winter: ▼€0

Total: ▼€7,650,000

==== Income ====
Summer: ▲€6,560,000

Winter: ▲€350,000

Total: ▲€6,910,000

==== Net Totals ====
Summer: ▼€1,090,000

Winter: ▲€350,000

Total: ▼€740,000

== Pre-season and friendlies ==
18 July 2008 Friendly	Arminia Bielefeld	1–1	AEK Athens	Leogang
19:30 EEST (UTC+3)	Tesche 59'	Report	Scocco 22'	Stadium: Steinbergstadion Leogang

26 July 2008 Friendly	AEK Athens	2–2	Greuther Fürth	Leogang
19:00 EEST (UTC+3)	Lagos (yellow card); Meichelbeck 83' (o.g.); Pliatsikas 85'	Report	Iličević 2'; Meichelbeck 31'	Stadium: Steinbergstadion Leogang

29 July 2008 Friendly	Energie Cottbus	1–1	AEK Athens	Kufstein
19:30 EEST (UTC+3)	Rangelov 55' (pen.)	Report	Kafes 56'	Stadium: Kufstein Arena; Attendance: 800

30 July 2008 Friendly	Bursaspor	0–1	AEK Athens	Jenbach
19:00 EEST (UTC+3)		Report	Rivaldo 58' (pen.)	Stadium: Stadion Jenbach

1 August 2008 Friendly	Genoa	1–0	AEK Athens	Jenbach
18:00 EEST (UTC+3)	Di Gennaro 59'	Report		Stadium: Stadion Jenbach

3 August 2008 Friendly	Ankaragücü	0–5	AEK Athens	Jenbach
19:15 EEST (UTC+3)		Report	Scocco 20'; Blanco 21'; Majstorović 28'; Pavlis 70'; Burns 73'	Stadium: Stadion Jenbach

8 August 2008 Friendly	AEK Athens	1–0	Bolton Wanderers	Marousi
21:00 EEST (UTC+3)	Rivaldo (penalty missed) 11'; Hetamaj 17'	Report	Cahill (red card) 19'	Stadium: Olympic Stadium; Attendance: 10,022; Referee: Ilias Spathas (Piraeus)

18 August 2008 Friendly	AEK Athens	1–1	Bologna	Marousi
19:00 EEST (UTC+3)	Rivaldo 66'	Report	Adaílton 31'	Stadium: Olympic Stadium; Attendance: 2,305; Referee: Michalis Germanakos (Athens)

21 August 2008 Friendly	AEK Athens	2–1	Groningen	Marousi
21:00 EEST (UTC+3)	Edinho (yellow card) 54'; Scocco 71'; Kone 88'	Report	García (yellow card) 15'; Powel 41', (yellow card) 66'; Lovre (yellow card) 74'	Stadium: Olympic Stadium; Attendance: 3,000; Referee: Christoforos Zografos (Athens)

6 September 2008 Friendly	Anagennisi Karditsa	2–2	AEK Athens	Karditsa
19:30 EEST (UTC+3)	Chatzirizos 54'; Diouf 68'	Report	Djebbour 6'; Kafes 32'	Stadium: Municipal Stadium of Karditsa; Attendance: 6,000; Referee: Periklis Golias (Athens)

7 September 2008 Friendly	Olympiacos Volos	0–3	AEK Athens	Volos
19:00 EEST (UTC+3)		Report	Lagos 27'; Blanco 38'; Zorbas 48'	Stadium: Panthessaliko Stadium; Attendance: 9,000

8 October 2008 Friendly	A.O. Nea Ionia	0–3	AEK Athens	Acharnes
18:00 EEST (UTC+3)		Report	Pavlis 45'; Djebbour 53'; Zorbas 81'	Stadium: Acharnes Stadium

29 October 2008 Friendly	AEK Athens	3–1	A.O. Nea Ionia	Thrakomakedones
16:00 EEST (UTC+3)	Pavlis 55', 67'; Pliatsikas 75'	Report	Balaskas 25'	Stadium: AEK Athens' training complex Attendance: Behind closed doors

== Competitions ==
=== Overall record ===
Competition	First match	Last match	Starting round	Final position	Record							
Competition	First match	Last match	Starting round	Final position	Pld	W	D	L	GF	GA	GD	Win %
Super League	31 August 2008	26 April 2009	Matchday 1	4th	30	14	13	3	40	24	+16	46.67
Super League Play-offs	10 May 2009	31 May 2009	Matchday 1	3rd	6	3	2	1	8	6	+2	50.00
Greek Cup	29 October 2009	29 October 2009	Round of 32	Runners-up	7	4	2	1	12	8	+4	57.14
UEFA Cup	14 August 2008	28 August 2008	Second qualifying round	Second qualifying round	2	0	1	1	2	3	−1	0.00
Total					45	21	18	6	62	41	+21	46.67

Last updated: 31 May 2009
Source: Competitions

=== Super League Greece ===
==== Regular season ====
===== League table =====
Pos	Team	Pld	W	D	L	GF	GA	GD	Pts	Qualification or relegation
2	PAOK	30	18	9	3	39	16	+23	63	Qualification for the Play-offs
3	Panathinaikos	30	17	10	3	51	18	+33	61	Qualification for the Play-offs
4	AEK Athens	30	14	13	3	40	24	+16	55	Qualification for the Play-offs
5	AEL	30	12	13	5	36	26	+10	49	Qualification for the Play-offs
6	Aris	30	13	8	9	30	31	−1	47	

Source: Super League Greece
Rules for classification: 1) Points; 2) Head-to-head points; 3) Head-to-head goal difference; 4) Play-offs (neutral ground).
(Note: Criterion 4 is only used if needed to decide champion, teams for relegation or teams for UEFA competitions).

===== Results summary =====
Overall								Home						Away					
Pld	W	D	L	GF	GA	GD	Pts	W	D	L	GF	GA	GD	W	D	L	GF	GA	GD
30	14	13	3	40	24	+16	55	11	2	2	21	9	+12	3	11	1	19	15	+4

Last updated: 2009-04-26.
Source: Super League Greece

===== Results by Matchday =====
Round	1	2	3	4	5	6	7	8	9	10	11	12	13	14	15	16	17	18	19	20	21	22	23	24	25	26	27	28	29	30
Ground	H	A	H	A	A	H	A	H	A	H	A	A	H	A	H	A	H	A	H	H	A	H	A	H	A	H	H	A	H	A
Result	W	D	W	D	L	D	D	W	D	D	D	D	W	D	W	D	W	W	W	L	D	W	W	W	W	W	W	D	L	D
Position	5	4	3	4	7	7	7	5	4	5	5	7	6	6	4	4	4	4	4	4	4	4	4	4	4	3	4	4	4	4

Updated to match(es) played on 26 April 2009. Source: slgr.gr
A = Away; H = Home; W = Win; D = Draw; L = Loss; P = Postponed

===== Matches =====
31 August 2008 1	AEK Athens	2–1	Panathinaikos	Marousi
21:15 EEST (UTC+3)	Edinho 20'; Kyrgiakos (yellow card) 21'; Basinas (yellow card) 45'; Blanco 45+5' (pen.); Pliatsikas (yellow card) 62'; Scocco (yellow card) 77'; Lagos (yellow card) 79'	Report	Karagounis (yellow card) 42', (goal) 90+4'; Spyropoulos (yellow card) 45+3'; Sarriegi (yellow card) 55'	Stadium: Olympic Stadium; Attendance: 30,140; Referee: Kyros Vassaras (Thessaloniki); Man of the Match: Edinho

14 September 2008 2	PAOK	1–1	AEK Athens	Thessaloniki
21:15 EEST (UTC+3)	Muslimović 15', (yellow card) 90+4'; Darlas (yellow card) 33'; Verón (yellow card) 41'	Report	Edinho (yellow card) 33'; Blanco 45+2'; Georgeas (yellow card) 70'; Majstorović (yellow card) 90+4'	Stadium: Toumba Stadium; Attendance: 25,203; Referee: Vasilis Paboridis (Kilkis); Man of the Match: Ismael Blanco

21 September 2008 3	AEK Athens	1–0	Iraklis	Marousi
21:15 EEST (UTC+3)	Scocco 14', (yellow card) 72'; Basinas (yellow card) 30'; Saja (yellow card) 90+4'	Report	Konstantinou (yellow card) 32'; Bourbos (yellow card) 33'	Stadium: Olympic Stadium; Attendance: 17,459; Referee: Nikitas Ntatis (Chios); Man of the Match: Sebastián Saja

28 September 2008 4	Panionios	2–2	AEK Athens	Nea Smyrni
19:00 EEST (UTC+3)	Kyrgiakos 26' (o.g.); Delura 68'; Krešić (yellow card) 90+2'	Report	Lagos (yellow card) 28'; Scocco (yellow card) 30', (goal) 58'; Kafes 90+4'	Stadium: Nea Smyrni Stadium; Attendance: 4,409; Referee: Giannis Stavridis (Pieria); Man of the Match: Ignacio Scocco

5 October 2008 5	Olympiacos	2–0	AEK Athens	Piraeus
21:15 EEST (UTC+3)	Kovačević 63'; Diogo 66'; Domi (yellow card) 68'; Patsatzoglou (yellow card) 82'	Report	Kyrgiakos (yellow card) 7'; Basinas (yellow card) 29'; Juanfran (yellow card) 57' (yellow-red card) 78'	Stadium: Karaiskakis Stadium; Attendance: 30,074; Referee: Kyros Vassaras (Thessaloniki); Man of the Match: Diogo

19 October 2008 6	AEK Athens	1–1	AEL	Marousi
16:45 EEST (UTC+3)	Blanco 84' (pen.)	Report	Venetidis (yellow card) 15'; Iglesias (yellow card) 64'; Dabizas (yellow card) 67'; Katsiaros (yellow card) 79'; Parra (yellow card) 88'; Sarmiento 90+1'	Stadium: Olympic Stadium; Attendance: 19,407; Referee: Anastasios Kakos (Corfu); Man of the Match: Ismael Blanco

26 October 2008 7	Thrasyvoulos	3–3	AEK Athens	Fyli
19:00 EET (UTC+2)	Tsiolis (yellow card) 21'; Marlon (yellow card) 29'; Gonçalves 52', 56'; Alves 71', (yellow card) 76'; Belegrinis (yellow card) 83'; Sotirhos (yellow card) 90+2'	Report	Scocco 10', 41'; Blanco (penalty missed) 31', 31'; Alexopoulos (yellow card) 51'	Stadium: Fyli Municipal Stadium; Attendance: 1,742; Referee: Kyros Vassaras (Thessaloniki); Man of the Match: Ignacio Scocco

2 November 2008 8	AEK Athens	2–1	Asteras Tripolis	Marousi
16:45 EET (UTC+2)	Kafes (yellow card) 46'; Rikka (yellow card) 66'; Majstorović 90'; Djebbour 90+3'; Georgeas (yellow card) 90+5'	Report	Damonte (yellow card) 39'; Marcelão 67'; Cesarec (yellow card) 84'; Kanakoudis (yellow card) 89'	Stadium: Olympic Stadium; Attendance: 14,108; Referee: Ilias Spathas (Piraeus); Man of the Match: Rafik Djebbour

8 November 2008 9	Skoda Xanthi	1–1	AEK Athens	Xanthi
19:00 EET (UTC+2)	Pappas (yellow card) 2'; Taïder 33'; Doriva (yellow card) 35'; Fliskas (yellow card) 74'; Vallas (yellow card) 89'	Report	Pelletieri (yellow card) 35'; Majstorović (yellow card) 44'; Blanco 62'	Stadium: Skoda Xanthi Arena; Attendance: 3,763; Referee: Anastasios Kakos (Corfu); Man of the Match: Ignacio Scocco

15 November 2008 10	AEK Athens	0–0	Panserraikos	Marousi
19:00 EET (UTC+2)	Majstorović (yellow card) 30'; Alexopoulos (yellow card) 68'; Kafes (yellow card) 90+2'	Report	Abubakari (yellow card) 59'; Zoundi (yellow card) 67'; Kottaras (yellow card) 73'; Kali (yellow card) 83'; Pipinis (yellow card) 90+2'	Stadium: Olympic Stadium; Attendance: 10,170; Referee: Dimitris Kyrkos (Epirus); Man of the Match: Dimitrios Kottaras

23 November 2008 11	OFI	1–1	AEK Athens	Heraklion
16:45 EET (UTC+2)	Simić (yellow card) 33'; Roubakis (yellow card) 65' (yellow-red card) 84'; Taralidis (yellow card) 73', (goal) 75'; Sfakianakis (yellow card) 90+3'	Report	Juanfran (yellow card) 43'; Nsaliwa (yellow card) 66'; Majstorović (yellow card) 81'; Kafes 86'	Stadium: Theodoros Vardinogiannis Stadium; Attendance: 4,732; Referee: Michalis Dakos (Xanthi); Man of the Match: Aleksandar Simić

30 November 2008 12	Levadiakos	0–0	AEK Athens	Livadeia
16:45 EET (UTC+2)	Nsaliwa (yellow card) 32'; Basinas (yellow card) 38', (penalty missed) 90+2'	Report	Katsikogiannis (yellow card) 55'; Tzorbatzakis (yellow card) 60'; Blažić (yellow card) 76'; Pastos (yellow card) 90+5'	Stadium: Levadia Municipal Stadium; Attendance: 3,156; Referee: Nikitas Ntatis (Chios); Man of the Match: Srđan Blažić

7 December 2008 13	AEK Athens	1–0	Panthrakikos	Marousi
19:00 EET (UTC+2)	Blanco 28', (yellow card) 29'; Pliatsikas (yellow card) 35'	Report	Kanotidis (yellow card) 39'	Stadium: Olympic Stadium; Attendance: 12,054; Referee: Vasilis Paboridis (Kilkis); Man of the Match: Tam Nsaliwa

14 December 2008 14	Aris	1–1	AEK Athens	Thessaloniki
19:00 EET (UTC+2)	Calvo 39', (yellow card) 59'; Lembo (yellow card) 51'	Report	Kafes (yellow card) 15'; Pliatsikas (yellow card) 17'; Basinas (yellow card) 67'; Edinho 71'	Stadium: Kleanthis Vikelidis Stadium; Attendance: 13,783; Referee: Giorgos Daloukas (Thessaly); Man of the Match: Edinho

21 December 2008 15	AEK Athens	3–2	Ergotelis	Marousi
16:45 EET (UTC+2)	Djebbour 6'; Blanco 39'; Basinas (yellow card) 42'; Nsaliwa (yellow card) 50'; Kyrgiakos (yellow card) 80'; Edinho 85'	Report	Fragoulakis 35'; Ogunsoto (yellow card) 45+2'; Kordonouris (yellow card) 61'; Budimir 76'; Martins (yellow card) 77'	Stadium: Olympic Stadium; Attendance: 12,019; Referee: Vangelis Katsidonis (Dodecanese); Man of the Match: Rafik Djebbour

4 January 2009 16	Panathinaikos	0–0	AEK Athens	Marousi
19:00 EET (UTC+2)	Spyropoulos (yellow card) 18'; Melissis (yellow card) 26'; Karagounis (yellow card) 88'	Report	Basinas (yellow card) 17'; Kafes (yellow card) 38'; Majstorović (yellow card) 84'; Saja (yellow card) 87'; Edinho (yellow card) 90+1'; Scocco (yellow card) 90+3'	Stadium: Olympic Stadium; Attendance: 42,018; Referee: Kyros Vassaras (Thessaloniki); Man of the Match: Angelos Basinas

11 January 2009 17	AEK Athens	1–0	PAOK	Marousi
20:15 EET (UTC+2)	Djebbour 45', (yellow card) 66'; Edinho (yellow card) 56'; Kyrgiakos (yellow card) 69'; Pelletieri (yellow card) 73'	Report	Contreras (yellow card) 27' (yellow-red card) 66'; Ivić (yellow card) 45+3'	Stadium: Olympic Stadium; Attendance: 19,194; Referee: Dimitris Kalopoulos (Thessaloniki); Man of the Match: Rafik Djebbour

17 January 2009 18	Iraklis	0–1	AEK Athens	Thessaloniki
19:00 EET (UTC+2)	Perperidis (yellow card) 67'; Sarakatsanos (yellow card) 79'	Report	Blanco 69'; Juanfran (yellow card) 78'; Saja (yellow card) 90'; Basinas (yellow card) 90+4'	Stadium: Kaftanzoglio Stadium; Attendance: 7,897; Referee: Michalis Lambropoulos (Elis); Man of the Match: Ismael Blanco

25 January 2009 19	AEK Athens	3–0	Panionios	Marousi
19:00 EET (UTC+2)	Blanco 7'; Edinho 27'; Juanfran (yellow card) 28'; Scocco 47'; Alves (yellow card) 90'	Report	Kontoes (yellow card) 17'	Stadium: Olympic Stadium; Attendance: 13,187; Referee: Anastasios Kakos (Corfu); Man of the Match: Ignacio Scocco

1 February 2009 20	AEK Athens	0–1	Olympiacos	Marousi
19:00 EET (UTC+2)	Juanfran (yellow card) 10'; Kyrgiakos (yellow card) 41'; Nsaliwa (yellow card) 56'	Report	Galletti 5'; Torosidis (yellow card) 44'; A. Papadopoulos (yellow card) 73'	Stadium: Olympic Stadium; Attendance: 44,104; Referee: Dimitris Kalopoulos (Thessaloniki); Man of the Match: Luciano Galletti

8 February 2009 21	AEL	1–1	AEK Athens	Larissa
16:45 EET (UTC+2)	Giannakopoulos (yellow card) 29'; Guela (yellow card) 76'; Fotakis 90'	Report	Koutromanos (yellow card) 36'; Nsaliwa (yellow card) 74'; Djebbour 90+1'; Edinho (yellow card) 90+3'	Stadium: Alcazar Stadium; Attendance: 6,148; Referee: Ilias Spathas (Piraeus); Man of the Match: Rafik Djebbour

14 February 2009 22	AEK Athens	1–0	Thrasyvoulos	Marousi
19:00 EET (UTC+2)	P. Hetemaj (yellow card) 28'; Kyrgiakos (yellow card) 64'; Tachtsidis 90+2'; Pliatsikas (yellow card) 90+5'; Saja (yellow card) 90+5'	Report	M. Hetemaj (yellow card) 30'; Liapakis (yellow card) 56'; Michos (yellow card) 83'; Peçanha (yellow card) 85'; Katsikis (yellow card) 90+6'	Stadium: Olympic Stadium; Attendance: 6,532; Referee: Lazaros Polatian (Pella); Man of the Match: Panagiotis Tachtsidis

22 February 2009 23	Asteras Tripolis	0–1	AEK Athens	Tripoli
19:00 EET (UTC+2)	Fytanidis (yellow card) 36'; Marcelão 85'; Flávio (yellow card) 90+4'	Report	Scocco (yellow card) 28'; Hetemaj (yellow card) 53'; Alves (yellow card) 84'; Majstorović 86'	Stadium: Asteras Tripolis Stadium; Attendance: 2,952; Referee: Dimitris Kyrkos (Epirus); Man of the Match: Daniel Majstorović

28 February 2009 24	AEK Athens	2–1	Skoda Xanthi	Marousi
19:00 EET (UTC+2)	Edinho 10'; Koutromanos (yellow card) 46'; Blanco 49'; Kyrgiakos (yellow card) 75'; Hetemaj (yellow card) 88'	Report	Grzelak (yellow card) 14'; Agali (yellow card) 42'; Poy 57'; Vallas (yellow card) 74'; Papadimitriou (yellow card) 74'	Stadium: Olympic Stadium; Attendance: 6,587; Referee: Michalis Lambropoulos (Elis); Man of the Match: Ismael Blanco

8 March 2009 25	Panserraikos	1–5	AEK Athens	Serres
16:45 EET (UTC+2)	Čeh 19' (pen.); Galanopoulos (yellow card) 24'; Kali (yellow card) 26'; Abubakari (yellow card) 27'; Milenković (yellow card) 79'	Report	Blanco 6', 43'; Alexopoulos (yellow card) 18'; Djebbour 28' (pen.), 35'; Scocco 45+1'; Pelletieri (yellow card) 52'	Stadium: Serres Municipal Stadium; Attendance: 5,673; Referee: Dimitris Kalopoulos (Thessaloniki); Man of the Match: Ismael Blanco

14 March 2009 26	AEK Athens	1–0	OFI	Marousi
19:00 EET (UTC+2)	Kafes 23'; Scocco (yellow card) 56'	Report	Malarz (yellow card) 29'; Bezares (yellow card) 32'; Arvanitis (yellow card) 71'	Stadium: Olympic Stadium; Attendance: 11,860; Referee: Vasilis Paboridis (Kilkis); Man of the Match: Panagiotis Tachtsidis

22 March 2009 27	AEK Athens	3–1	Levadiakos	Marousi
20:00 EET (UTC+2)	Djebbour 2'; Blanco 39'; Scocco (yellow card) 63'; Edinho 81'	Report	Kiassos 27'; Koltzos (yellow card) 64'; Machado (yellow card) 79'	Stadium: Olympic Stadium; Attendance: 6,045; Referee: Petros Konstantineas (Messinia); Man of the Match: Rafik Djebbour

5 April 2009 28	Panthrakikos	1–1	AEK Athens	Komotini
19:00 EEST (UTC+3)	Matthys 24', (yellow card) 53'; Clément (yellow card) 27'; Velasco (yellow card) 90+5'	Report	Georgeas (yellow card) 49'; Blanco 57'; Pelletieri (yellow card) 77'	Stadium: Komotini Stadium; Attendance: 4,200; Referee: Ilias Mazarakos (Arta); Man of the Match: Spyros Vrontaras

12 April 2009 29	AEK Athens	0–1	Aris	Marousi
19:00 EEST (UTC+3)	Alexopoulos (yellow card) 43'; Majstorović (yellow card) 75'; Burns (yellow card) 90+1'; Alves (yellow card) 90+5'	Report	Koke 23', (yellow card) 27' (red card) 83'; Regueiro (yellow card) 90+4'	Stadium: Olympic Stadium; Attendance: 13,847; Referee: Anastasios Kakos (Corfu); Man of the Match: Sergio Koke

26 April 2009 30	Ergotelis	1–1	AEK Athens	Heraklion
19:00 EEST (UTC+3)	Gilberto (yellow card) 81'; Fragoulakis 86'; Kordonouris (yellow card) 90+3'	Report	Edinho 84'; Blanco (penalty missed) 89'; Hetemaj (yellow card) 89'	Stadium: Pankritio Stadium; Attendance: 3,652; Referee: Dimitris Kalopoulos (Thessaloniki); Man of the Match: Michail Fragoulakis

==== Play-offs ====
===== Table =====
Pos	Team	Pld	W	D	L	GF	GA	GD	Pts	Qualification
2	Panathinaikos	6	5	1	0	12	3	+9	18	Qualification for the Champions League third qualifying round
3	AEK Athens	6	3	2	1	8	6	+2	12	Qualification for the Europa League play-off round
4	PAOK	6	2	0	4	5	9	−4	9	Qualification for the Europa League third qualifying round
5	AEL	6	0	1	5	3	10	−7	1	Qualification for the Europa League second qualifying round

Source: Super League Greece and Worldfootball.net
Rules for classification: 1) points; 2) head-to-head points; 3) head-to-head goal difference; 4) head-to-head goals scored; 5) goal difference; 6) number of goals scored.

===== Results summary =====
Overall								Home						Away					
Pld	W	D	L	GF	GA	GD	Pts	W	D	L	GF	GA	GD	W	D	L	GF	GA	GD
6	3	2	1	8	6	+2	12	2	0	1	6	5	+1	1	2	0	2	1	+1

Last updated: 2009-05-31.
Source: Super League Greece

===== Results by Matchday =====
Round	1	2	3	4	5	6
Ground	H	A	A	H	A	H
Result	W	D	W	W	D	L
Position	4	4	3	3	3	3

Updated to match(es) played on 31 May 2009. Source: slgr.gr
A = Away; H = Home; W = Win; D = Draw; L = Loss; P = Postponed

===== Matches =====
10 May 2009 1	AEK Athens	3–2	AEL	Marousi
21:10 EEST (UTC+3)	Pavlis (yellow card) 8', (goal) 14'; Manduca 40'; Blanco 79' (pen.); Alves (yellow card) 84'; Tachtsidis (yellow card) 87'; Scocco (yellow card) 90+1'	Report	Parra 9', (yellow card) 21'; Ilić (yellow card) 21', (goal) 24'; Tsigas (yellow card) 84'; Venetidis (yellow card) 90+1'; Kyriakos (yellow card) 90+3'	Stadium: Olympic Stadium; Attendance: 8,864; Referee: Michael Koukoulakis (Heraklion); Man of the Match: Ismael Blanco

13 May 2009 2	Panathinaikos	1–1	AEK Athens	Marousi
19:00 EEST (UTC+3)	Salpingidis (penalty missed) 27; Gabriel 43' (pen.), (yellow card) 56'; Spyropoulos (yellow card) 70'; Christodoulopoulos (yellow card) 82'	Report	Scocco 12'; Alexopoulos (yellow card) 26'; Kafes (yellow card) 72'	Stadium: Olympic Stadium; Attendance: 22,980; Referee: Ilias Spathas (Piraeus); Man of the Match: Gabriel

17 May 2009 3	PAOK	0–1	AEK Athens	Thessaloniki
21:15 EEST (UTC+3)	Bakayoko (yellow card) 24'; Contreras (yellow card) 77'; Conceição (yellow card) 90+3'	Report	Nsaliwa (yellow card) 6'; Georgeas (yellow card) 12' (yellow-red card) 71'; Blanco 40'; Manduca (yellow card) 47'; Hetemaj (yellow card) 67' (yellow-red card) 84'	Stadium: Toumba Stadium; Attendance: 28,703; Referee: Giorgos Daloukas (Thessaly); Man of the Match: Ismael Blanco

20 May 2009 4	AEK Athens	3–1	PAOK	Marousi
19:00 EEST (UTC+3)	Djebbour 9'; Blanco 39'; Alves (yellow card) 53'; Chalkias 60' (o.g.)	Report	Ivić 35'; Sorlin (yellow card) 45' (yellow-red card) 45'; Chalkias (yellow card) 45+1'	Stadium: Olympic Stadium; Attendance: 14,831; Referee: Anastasios Kakos (Corfu); Man of the Match: Rafik Djebbour

24 May 2009 5	AEL	0–0	AEK Athens	Larissa
19:00 EEST (UTC+3)	Giannakopoulos (yellow card) 9'; Parra (penalty missed) 18; Iglesias (yellow card) 34' (yellow-red card) 45'; Katsiaros (yellow card) 83'	Report	Nsaliwa (yellow card) 34'; Hetemaj (yellow card) 79'	Stadium: Alkazar Stadium; Attendance: 4,328; Referee: Dimitris Kalopoulos (Thessaloniki); Man of the Match: Dino Seremet

31 May 2009 6	AEK Athens	0–2	Panathinaikos	Marousi
21:15 EEST (UTC+3)	Saja (yellow card) 29'	Report	Simão (yellow card) 8'; Karagounis 30' (pen.); Rukavina 36'; Mattos (yellow card) 83'	Stadium: Olympic Stadium; Attendance: 30,435; Referee: Anastasios Kakos (Corfu); Man of the Match: Giorgos Karagounis

=== Greek Cup ===
AEK entered the Greek Cup at the round of 32.

==== Matches ====
11 November 2008 Round of 32	Ilisiakos	1–2 (a.e.t.)	AEK Athens	Egaleo
19:00 EET (UTC+2)	Nastos (yellow card) 22'; Tampasis (yellow card) 57'; Mondroni (yellow card) 64' (yellow-red card) 111'; Pavlidis (yellow card) 76'; Tsitsomitsos 99'; Veletis (yellow card) 103'	Report	Juanfran (yellow card) 54'; Lagos (yellow card) 96'; Blanco 94'; Kafes 107'	Stadium: Stavros Mavrothalassitis Stadium; Attendance: 499; Referee: Petros Konstantineas (Messinia)

22 January 2009 Round of 16	AEK Athens	1–0	Kerkyra	Marousi
16:45 EET (UTC+2)	Alves (yellow card) 14'; Basinas (yellow card) 21'; Edinho (penalty missed) 45+1'; Scocco 89'	Report	Vitouladitis (yellow card) 45+1'; Tsemperidis (yellow card) 69'; Gustavinho (yellow card) 78'	Stadium: Olympic Stadium; Attendance: 4,315; Referee: Christoforos Zografos (Athens)

===== Quarter-finals =====
18 February 2009 First leg	Skoda Xanthi	2–1	AEK Athens	Xanthi
21:30 EET (UTC+2)	Papadimitriou (yellow card) 7'; Abrahám 43'; Došek 68'; Poy (yellow card) 69'; Tziortziopoulos (yellow card) 80'; Abrahám (yellow card) 90'	Report	Blanco 5' (pen.), (yellow card) 79'; Kyrgiakos (yellow card) 16'; Nsaliwa (yellow card) 30'; Majstorović (yellow card) 73'	Stadium: Skoda Xanthi Arena; Attendance: 2,449; Referee: Giorgos Stathopoulos (Achaia)

25 February 2009 Second leg	AEK Athens	1–0 (2(a)–2 agg.)	Skoda Xanthi	Marousi
19:00 EET (UTC+2)	Pelletieri (yellow card) 45'; Nsaliwa (yellow card) 68'; Blanco 83'; Kyrgiakos (yellow card) 87'	Report	Poy (yellow card) 25'; Zuela (yellow card) 54'; Vallas (yellow card) 54'; Fliskas (yellow card) 80'	Stadium: Olympic Stadium; Attendance: 6,480; Referee: Giannis Stavridis (Pieria); Man of the Match: Ismael Blanco

===== Semi-finals =====
18 March 2009 First leg	AEK Athens	3–1	Panserraikos	Marousi
19:00 EET (UTC+2)	Djebbour 20', 40'; Majstorović 38'	Report	Aurélio 24'	Stadium: Olympic Stadium; Attendance: 7,642; Referee: Nathanail Charalabidis (Kavala); Man of the Match: Rafik Djebbour

8 April 2009 Second leg	Panserraikos	0–0 (1–3 agg.)	AEK Athens	Serres
17:00 EEST (UTC+3)	Papazoglou (yellow card) 38'; Galanopoulos (yellow card) 45' (yellow-red card) 90'	Report	Manduca (yellow card) 90'	Stadium: Stadium of Serres; Attendance: 5,000; Referee: Giorgos Kastanidis (Thessaloniki)

===== Final =====
2 May 2009 Final	AEK Athens	4–4 (a.e.t.) (14–15 p)	Olympiacos	Marousi
20:30 EEST (UTC+3)	Blanco 4', 8'; Kafes (yellow card) 28'; Kyrgiakos (yellow card) 35' (red card) 90+1'; Nsaliwa (yellow card) 53'; Alves (yellow card) 72'; Scocco 90', 107', (yellow card) 107'; Edinho (yellow card) 111'	Report	Papadopoulos (yellow card) 35' (yellow-red card) 105'; Derbyshire 47', 90+6'; Galletti (yellow card) 68' (yellow-red card) 104', (goal) 102'; Dudu 72'	Stadium: Olympic Stadium; Attendance: 48,594; Referee: Anastasios Kakos (Corfu)
	Penalties
	Kafes (penalty scored); Blanco (penalty scored); Scocco (penalty scored); Edinho (penalty scored); Majstorović (penalty missed); Nsaliwa (penalty scored); Saja (penalty scored); Pelletieri (penalty scored); Georgeas (penalty missed); Kafes (penalty scored); Blanco (penalty scored); Scocco (penalty scored); Edinho (penalty scored); Majstorović (penalty scored); Nsaliwa (penalty scored); Saja (penalty scored); Pelletieri (penalty missed)		(penalty scored) Óscar; (penalty scored) Dudu; (penalty scored) Diogo; (penalty scored) Domi; (penalty missed) Đorđević; (penalty scored) Torosidis; (penalty scored) Belluschi; (penalty scored) Nikopolidis; (penalty missed) Antzas; (penalty scored) Óscar; (penalty scored) Dudu; (penalty scored) Diogo; (penalty scored) Domi; (penalty scored) Đorđević; (penalty scored) Torosidis; (penalty scored) Belluschi; (penalty scored) Nikopolidis

=== UEFA Cup ===
==== Second qualifying round ====
The draw for the second qualifying round was held on 1 August 2008.

14 August 2008 First leg	AEK Athens (Greece)	0–1	(Cyprus) Omonia	Athens, Greece
21:30 EEST (UTC+3)	Rivaldo (yellow card) 5'; Scocco (yellow card) 90+1'	Report	Duro (yellow card) 18'; Clayton (yellow card) 20'; Cafú 40'; Ndikumana (yellow card) 51'	Stadium: Olympic Stadium; Attendance: 13,472; Referee: Serge Gumienny (Belgium)

28 August 2008 Second leg	Omonia (Cyprus)	2–2 (3–2 agg.)	(Greece) AEK Athens	Nicosia, Cyprus
20:00 EEST (UTC+3)	Duro 11', 70'; Wenzel (yellow card) 64'; Niculescu (yellow card) 90+1'	Report	Majstorović (yellow card) 12'; Blanco 16'; Scocco (yellow card) 22' (yellow-red card) 58'; Edinho (yellow card) 30'; Basinas (yellow card) 37'; Zorbas (yellow card) 86'; Pavlis 89'; Juanfran (red card) 90+2'	Stadium: GSP Stadium; Attendance: 20,267; Referee: Thorsten Kinhöfer (Germany)

== Statistics ==
=== Squad statistics ===
As of 31 May 2009

No.	Pos	Player	Super League		Super League Play-offs		Greek Cup		UEFA Cup		Total	
No.	Pos	Player	Apps	Goals	Apps	Goals	Apps	Goals	Apps	Goals	Apps	Goals
Goalkeepers
23	GK	(Argentina) Sebastián Saja	29	0	6	0	5	0	2	0	42	0
77	GK	(Austria) Jürgen Macho	1	0	0	0	2	0	0	0	3	0
84	GK	(Greece) Giannis Arabatzis	0	0	0	0	0	0	0	0	0	0
Defenders
4	DF	(Portugal) Geraldo Alves	10	0	2	0	4	0	0	0	16	0
5	DF	(Sweden) Daniel Majstorović	28	2	6	0	7	1	2	0	43	3
6	DF	(Greece) Georgios Alexopoulos	12	0	5	0	2	0	1	0	20	0
7	DF	(Spain) Juanfran	21	0	0	0	4	0	2	0	27	0
12	DF	(France) Olivier N'Siabamfumu	1	0	1	0	0	0	0	0	2	0
13	DF	(Greece) Dimitrios Koutromanos	10	0	5	0	2	0	0	0	17	0
25	DF	(Greece) Sotirios Kyrgiakos	19	0	1	0	5	0	1	0	26	0
31	DF	(Greece) Nikolaos Georgeas	19	0	5	0	5	0	0	0	29	0
Midfielders
1	MF	(Greece) Pantelis Kafes	22	3	5	0	5	1	3	0	35	4
8	MF	(Canada) Tam Nsaliwa	18	0	5	0	5	0	0	0	28	0
11	MF	(Brazil) Gustavo Manduca	13	0	6	1	4	0	0	0	23	1
16	MF	(Greece) Vasilios Pliatsikas	14	0	0	0	3	0	0	0	17	0
17	MF	(Greece) Antonis Rikka	3	0	0	0	0	0	2	0	5	0
19	MF	(Greece) Panagiotis Lagos	14	0	0	0	1	0	2	0	17	0
24	MF	(Argentina) Agustín Pelletieri	23	0	4	0	5	0	0	0	32	0
34	MF	(Greece) Panagiotis Tachtsidis	8	1	1	0	4	0	0	0	13	1
56	MF	(Finland) Përparim Hetemaj	9	0	3	0	2	0	2	0	16	0
80	MF	(Senegal) El Hadji Diouf	6	0	2	0	2	0	0	0	10	0
90	MF	(Greece) Savvas Gentsoglou	1	0	4	0	0	0	0	0	5	0
Forwards
9	FW	(Portugal) Edinho	25	7	4	0	6	0	1	0	36	7
10	FW	(Algeria) Rafik Djebbour	23	7	5	1	5	2	0	0	33	10
18	FW	(Argentina) Ismael Blanco	30	14	6	3	6	5	2	1	44	23
20	FW	(Australia) Nathan Burns	5	0	0	0	0	0	0	0	5	0
32	FW	(Argentina) Ignacio Scocco	27	6	5	1	7	3	2	0	41	10
83	FW	(Greece) Michalis Pavlis	7	0	3	1	3	0	2	1	15	2
Left during Summer Transfer Window
—	MF	(Brazil) Rivaldo	0	0	0	0	0	0	1	0	1	0
Left during Winter Transfer Window
2	DF	(Brazil) Edson Ratinho	3	0	0	0	1	0	2	0	6	0
14	MF	(Greece) Angelos Basinas	14	0	0	0	2	0	1	0	17	0
40	MF	(Greece) Panagiotis Zorbas	3	0	0	0	2	0	2	0	7	0

=== Goalscorers ===
As of 31 May 2009
The list is sorted by competition order when total goals are equal, then by position and then by squad number.

Rank	No.	Pos.	Player	Super League	Super League Play-offs	Greek Cup	UEFA Cup	Total
1	18	FW	(Argentina) Ismael Blanco	14	3	5	1	23
2	10	FW	(Algeria) Rafik Djebbour	7	1	2	0	10
2	32	FW	(Argentina) Ignacio Scocco	6	1	3	0	10
4	9	FW	(Portugal) Edinho	7	0	0	0	7
5	1	MF	(Greece) Pantelis Kafes	3	0	1	0	4
6	5	DF	(Sweden) Daniel Majstorović	2	0	1	0	3
7	83	FW	(Greece) Michalis Pavlis	0	1	0	1	2
8	34	MF	(Greece) Panagiotis Tachtsidis	1	0	0	0	1
8	11	MF	(Brazil) Gustavo Manduca	0	1	0	0	1
Own goals				0	1	0	0	1
Totals				40	8	12	2	62

=== Assists ===
As of 31 May 2009
The list is sorted by competition order when total assists are equal, then by position and then by squad number.

Rank	No.	Pos.	Player	Super League	Super League Play-offs	Greek Cup	UEFA Cup	Total
1	32	FW	(Argentina) Ignacio Scocco	9	0	1	0	10
2	18	FW	(Argentina) Ismael Blanco	2	1	2	1	6
3	31	DF	(Greece) Nikolaos Georgeas	3	0	0	0	3
3	11	MF	(Brazil) Gustavo Manduca	2	0	1	0	3
3	9	FW	(Portugal) Edinho	1	0	2	0	3
6	25	DF	(Greece) Sotirios Kyrgiakos	2	0	0	0	2
6	34	MF	(Greece) Panagiotis Tachtsidis	2	0	0	0	2
6	8	MF	(Canada) Tam Nsaliwa	1	1	0	0	2
6	10	FW	(Algeria) Rafik Djebbour	1	0	1	0	2
10	1	MF	(Greece) Pantelis Kafes	1	0	0	0	1
10	19	MF	(Greece) Panagiotis Lagos	1	0	0	0	1
10	56	MF	(Finland) Përparim Hetemaj	0	1	0	0	1
10	6	DF	(Greece) Georgios Alexopoulos	0	0	1	0	1
10	4	DF	(Portugal) Geraldo Alves	0	0	1	0	1
10	14	MF	(Greece) Angelos Basinas	0	0	0	1	1
Totals				25	3	9	2	39

=== Clean sheets ===
As of 31 May 2009
The list is sorted by competition order when total clean sheets are equal and then by squad number. Clean sheets in games where both goalkeepers participated are awarded to the goalkeeper who started the game. Goalkeepers with no appearances are not included.

Rank	No.	Player	Super League	Super League Play-offs	Greek Cup	UEFA Cup	Total
1	23	(Argentina) Sebastián Saja	11	2	2	0	15
2	77	(Austria) Jürgen Macho	0	0	1	0	1
Totals			11	2	3	0	16

=== Disciplinary record ===
As of 31 May 2009

N	P	Nat.	Name	Super League			Super League Play-offs			Greek Cup			UEFA Cup			Total			Notes
N	P	Nat.	Name	Yellow card	Second yellow card	Red card	Yellow card	Second yellow card	Red card	Yellow card	Second yellow card	Red card	Yellow card	Second yellow card	Red card	Yellow card	Second yellow card	Red card	Notes
Goalkeepers
23	GK	(Argentina)	Sebastián Saja	4			1									5			
77	GK	(Austria)	Jürgen Macho							1						1			
84	GK	(Greece)	Giannis Arabatzis																
Defenders
4	DF	(Portugal)	Geraldo Alves	3			1			2						6			
5	DF	(Sweden)	Daniel Majstorović	6						2			1			9			
6	DF	(Greece)	Georgios Alexopoulos	4			1									5			
7	DF	(Spain)	Juanfran	6	1					1					1	7	1	1	
12	DF	(France)	Olivier N'Siabamfumu																
13	DF	(Greece)	Dimitrios Koutromanos	2												2			
25	DF	(Greece)	Sotirios Kyrgiakos	7						3		1				10		1	
31	DF	(Greece)	Nikolaos Georgeas	3			2	1								5	1		
Midfielders
1	MF	(Greece)	Pantelis Kafes	4			2			1						7			
8	MF	(Canada)	Tam Nsaliwa	5			2			3						10			
11	MF	(Brazil)	Gustavo Manduca				1			1						2			
16	MF	(Greece)	Vasilios Pliatsikas	4												4			
17	MF	(Greece)	Antonis Rikka	1												1			
19	MF	(Greece)	Panagiotis Lagos	2						1						3			
24	MF	(Argentina)	Agustín Pelletieri	4						1						5			
34	MF	(Greece)	Panagiotis Tachtsidis				1									1			
56	MF	(Finland)	Përparim Hetemaj	4			2	1								6	1		
80	MF	(Senegal)	El Hadji Diouf																
90	MF	(Greece)	Savvas Gentsoglou																
Forwards
9	FW	(Portugal)	Edinho	4						1			1			6			
10	FW	(Algeria)	Rafik Djebbour	1												1			
18	MF	(Argentina)	Ismael Blanco	1						1						2			
20	FW	(Australia)	Nathan Burns	1												1			
32	FW	(Argentina)	Ignacio Scocco	7			1			1			2	1		11	1		
83	FW	(Greece)	Michalis Pavlis				1									1			
Left during Summer Transfer window
—	MF	(Brazil)	Rivaldo										1			1			
Left during Winter Transfer window
2	DF	(Brazil)	Edson Ratinho																
14	MF	(Greece)	Angelos Basinas	8						1			1			10			
40	MF	(Greece)	Panagiotis Zorbas										1			1			

=== Starting 11 ===
This section presents the most frequently used formation along with the players with the most starts across all competitions.

N.	Formation	Matchday(s)
40	4–3–3	1–15, 17, 18, 21–30
3	4–4–2 (D)	16, 19, 20
2	4–4–2

No.	Nat.	Player	Pos.
23	(Argentina)	Sebastián Saja	GK
25	(Greece)	Sotirios Kyrgiakos (C)	RCB
5	(Sweden)	Daniel Majstorović	LCB
31	(Greece)	Nikolaos Georgeas	RB
7	(Spain)	Juanfran	LB
8	(Canada)	Tam Nsaliwa	DM
24	(Argentina)	Agustín Pelletieri	RCM
1	(Greece)	Pantelis Kafes	LCM
10	(Algeria)	Rafik Djebbour	RW
32	(Argentina)	Ignacio Scocco	LW
18	(Argentina)	Ismael Blanco	CF

Last updated: 2009-05-31

=== UEFA rankings ===
UEFA team ranking

#	Form	Previous	Country	Team	Ranking
80		77	(Netherlands)	Feyenoord	25.825
81		69	(Romania)	Dinamo București	25.781
82		83	(Greece)	AEK Athens	25.632
83		84	(Czech Republic)	Slavia Prague	25.150
84		95	(France)	Nancy	25.033

UEFA country ranking

#	Form	Previous	Country	League	Ranking
10		8	(Portugal)	Liga Sagres	36.462
11		11	(Turkey)	Turkcell Super Lig	32.225
12		14	(Greece)	Super League Greece	28.165
13		10	(Scotland)	Clydesdale Bank Premier League	27.875
14		13	(Belgium)	Jupiler Pro League	25.325

== Awards ==
Player	Pos.	Award	Source
(Algeria) Rafik Djebbour	FW	Best Goal Award (8th Matchday)	
(Portugal) Edinho	FW	Best Goal Award (14th Matchday)	
(Argentina) Ignacio Scocco	FW	MVP Award (19th Matchday)	
(Argentina) Ignacio Scocco	FW	Best Goal Award (19th Matchday)	
(Greece) Panagiotis Tachtsidis	MF	Best Goal Award (22nd Matchday)	
(Portugal) Edinho	FW	Best Goal Award (24th Matchday)	
(Argentina) Ignacio Scocco	FW	MVP Award (27th Matchday)	
(Argentina) Ismael Blanco	FW	Super League Top Scorer (shared)	
(Argentina) Ismael Blanco	FW	Greek Cup Top Scorer	
