= 2009 Greek Football Cup final =

2009 Greek Cup Final
- Event: 2008–09 Greek Football Cup
| AEK Athens | Olympiacos |
| 4 | 4 |
- After extra time Olympiacos won 15–14 on penalties
- Date: 2 May 2009
- Venue: Olympic Stadium, Marousi, Athens
- Man of the Match: Matt Derbyshire (Olympiacos)
- Referee: Anastasios Kakos (Corfu)
- Attendance: 48,594
- Weather: Fair; 13 °C (55 °F); 82% humidity

The 2009 Greek Cup final was the 65th final of the Greek Cup. The match took place on 2 May 2009 at the Olympic Stadium. The contesting teams were AEK Athens and Olympiacos. It was AEK Athens' nineteenth Greek Cup final in their 85-year history and Olympiacos' thirty fourth Greek Cup final and second consecutive in their 84 years of existence. With 8 goals, including 2 turnarounds and a penalty shoot-out of 29 penalties in total, the match was widely considered as the most entertaining final in the tournament. It was the last match for the captain of Olympiacos, Predrag Đorđević as a footballer, having spent 13 years of his 17 years playing for the club.

== Venue ==
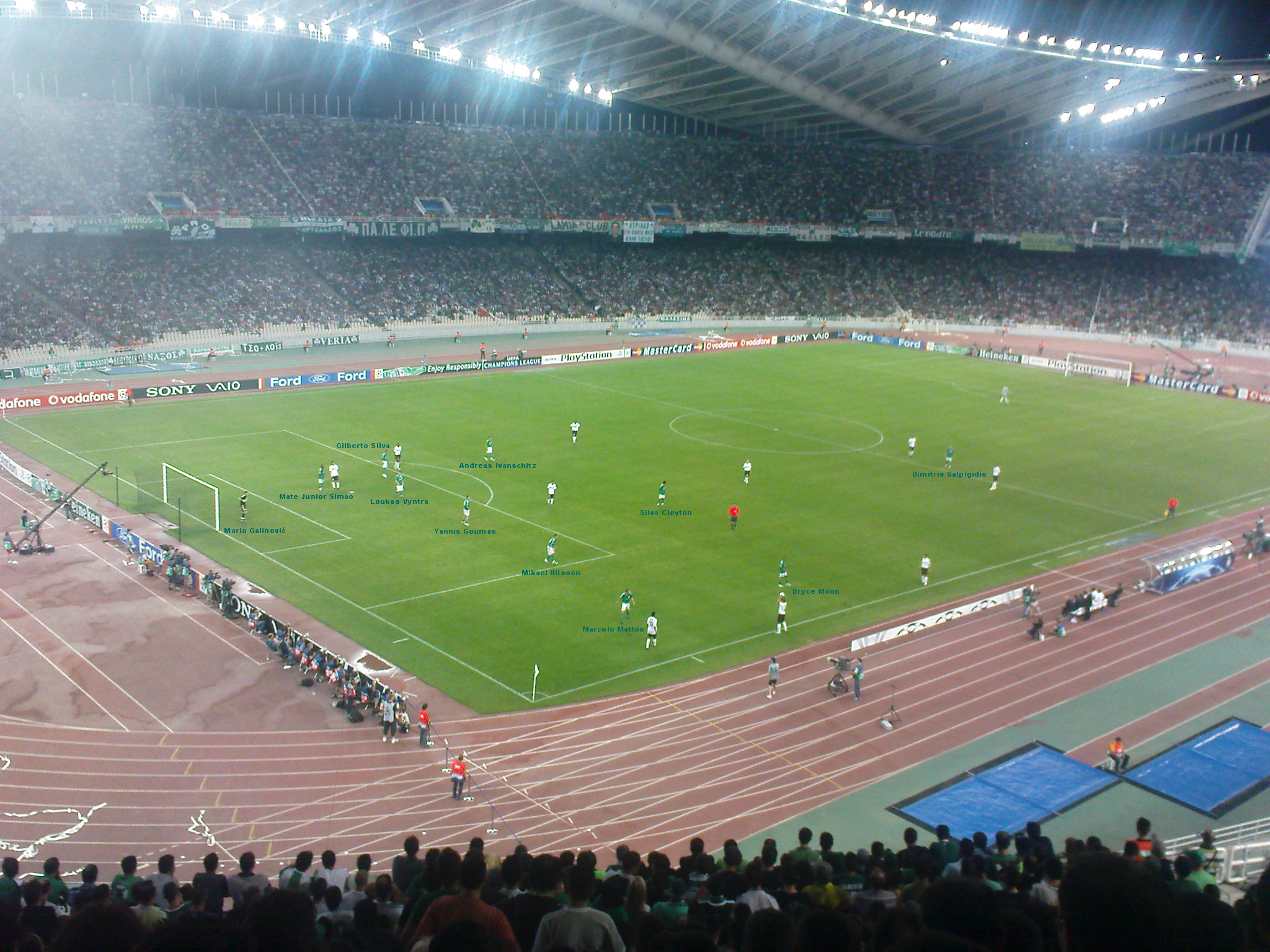
Athens Olympic Stadium.

This was the sixteenth Greek Cup final held at the Athens Olympic Stadium, after the 1983, 1984, 1985, 1986, 1987, 1988, 1989, 1990, 1993, 1994, 1995, 1996, 1999, 2000 and 2002 finals.

The Athens Olympic Stadium was built in 1982 and renovated once in 2004. The stadium is used as a venue for AEK Athens and Panathinaikos and was used for Olympiacos and Greece on various occasions. Its current capacity is 69,618 and it hosted three European Cup/UEFA Champions League finals in 1983, 1994 and 2007, a UEFA Cup Winners' Cup final in 1987, the 1991 Mediterranean Games and the 2004 Summer Olympics.

== Background ==
AEK Athens had reached the Greek Cup final eighteen times, winning eleven of them. The last time that they had won the Cup was in 2002, (2–1 against Olympiacos). The last time that they had played in a final was in 2006, where they had lost to Olympiacos by 3–0.

Olympiacos had reached the Greek Cup final thirty three times, winning twenty three of them. The last time that they had played in a Final was in 2008, where they had won against Aris by 2–0.

The two teams had met each other in a Cup final four times in the 1953, 1956, 2002 and 2006 finals.

== Route to the final ==
| AEK Athens | | | | Round | Olympiacos | | | |
|---|---|---|---|---|---|---|---|---|
| Opponent | Agg. | 1st leg | 2nd leg | | Opponent | Agg. | 1st leg | 2nd leg |
| Ilisiakos | 2–1 (A) | | | Round of 32 | Diagoras | 3–2 (A) | | |
| Kerkyra | 1–0 (H) | | | Round of 16 | OFI | 2–0 (A) | | |
| Skoda Xanthi | 2–2 (a) | 1–2 (A) | 1–0 (H) | Quarter-finals | PAOK | 2–1 | 0–1 (A) | 2–0 (a.e.t.) (H) |
| Panserraikos | 3–1 | 3–1 (H) | 0–0 (A) | Semi-finals | Asteras Tripolis | 4–3 | 2–2 (A) | 2–1 (H) |

== Match ==
=== Details ===
2 May 2009
20:30 EEST

| AEK Athens | 4–4 (a.e.t.) | Olympiacos |
|---|---|---|
| Blanco 4', 8'; Scocco 90', 107' | Report | Derbyshire 47', 90+6'; Dudu 72'; Galletti 102' |
Penalties
| Kafes (penalty scored); Blanco (penalty scored); Scocco (penalty scored); Edinho (penalty scored); Majstorović (penalty missed); Nsaliwa (penalty scored); Saja (penalty scored); Pelletieri (penalty scored); Georgeas (penalty missed); Kafes (penalty scored); Blanco (penalty scored); Scocco (penalty scored); Edinho (penalty scored); Majstorović (penalty scored); Nsaliwa (penalty scored); Saja (penalty scored); Pelletieri (penalty missed) | 14–15 | (penalty scored) Óscar; (penalty scored) Dudu; (penalty scored) Diogo; (penalty scored) Domi; (penalty missed) Đorđević; (penalty scored) Torosidis; (penalty scored) Belluschi; (penalty scored) Nikopolidis; (penalty missed) Antzas; (penalty scored) Óscar; (penalty scored) Dudu; (penalty scored) Diogo; (penalty scored) Domi; (penalty scored) Đorđević; (penalty scored) Torosidis; (penalty scored) Belluschi; (penalty scored) Nikopolidis |

Olympic Stadium, Marousi
Attendance: 48,594
Referee: Anastasios Kakos (Corfu)

| AEK Athens | Olympiacos |

| GK | 23 | (Argentina) Sebastián Saja |
| RB | 31 | (Greece) Nikolaos Georgeas |
| CB | 25 | (Greece) Sotirios Kyrgiakos (c) | (yellow card) 34' (yellow-red card) 90' | (substituted off) 62' |
| CB | 5 | (Sweden) Daniel Majstorović |
| LB | 4 | (Portugal) Geraldo Alves | (yellow card) 74' |
| DM | 8 | (Canada) Tamandani Nsaliwa | (yellow card) 43' |
| CM | 1 | (Greece) Pantelis Kafes | (yellow card) 28' |
| RM | 11 | (Brazil) Gustavo Manduca | | (substituted off) 68' |
| LM | 32 | (Argentina) Ignacio Scocco |
| SS | 10 | (Algeria) Rafik Djebbour | | (substituted off) 77' |
| CF | 18 | (Argentina) Ismael Blanco |
Substitutes:
| GK | 77 | (Austria) Jürgen Macho |
| DF | 6 | (Greece) Georgios Alexopoulos | | (substituted on) 62' |
| MF | 16 | (Greece) Vasilios Pliatsikas |
| MF | 24 | (Argentina) Agustín Pelletieri | | (substituted on) 68' |
| MF | 56 | (Finland) Perparim Hetemaj |
| FW | 9 | (Portugal) Edinho | (yellow card) 111' | (substituted on) 77' |
| FW | 83 | (Greece) Michalis Pavlis |
Manager:
(Bosnia and Herzegovina) Dušan Bajević

| GK | 71 | (Greece) Antonios Nikopolidis (c) |
| RB | 35 | (Greece) Vasilis Torosidis |
| CB | 21 | (Greece) Avraam Papadopoulos | (yellow card) 34' (yellow-red card) 107' |
| CB | 18 | (Greece) Paraskevas Antzas |
| LB | 3 | (France) Didier Domi |
| DM | 2 | (Greece) Christos Patsatzoglou | | (substituted off) 46' |
| CM | 20 | (Brazil) Dudu |
| RM | 7 | (Argentina) Luciano Galletti | (yellow card) 68' (yellow-red card) 102' |
| LM | 23 | (Argentina) Sebastián Leto | | (substituted off) 62' |
| AM | 25 | (Argentina) Fernando Belluschi |
| CF | 10 | (Brazil) Diogo |
Substitutes:
| GK | 1 | (Greece) Leonidas Panagopoulos |
| DF | 14 | (Poland) Michał Żewłakow |
| DF | 30 | (Greece) Anastasios Pantos |
| MF | 8 | (Spain) Óscar | | (substituted on) 97' |
| MF | 11 | (Serbia) Predrag Đorđević | | (substituted on) 62' |
| MF | 33 | (Greece) Giannis Papadopoulos |
| FW | 27 | (England) Matt Derbyshire | | (substituted on) 46' (substituted off) 97' |
Manager:
(Spain) Ernesto Valverde

Man of the Match:
(England) Matt Derbyshire (Olympiacos)

Assistant referees:
Thanasis Thanasakoudis (Macedonia)
Dimitris Bozatzidis (Macedonia)
Fourth official:
Michael Koukoulakis (Heraklion)

Match rules

- 90 minutes
- 30 minutes of extra time if necessary
- Penalty shootout if scores still level
- Seven named substitutes
- Maximum of three substitutions

== See also ==
- 2008–09 Greek Football Cup
