= Nicholas X. Notias =

American businessman

- Born: 1966 (age 59–60); New York City
- Education: Master of Business Administration Fordham University – Bachelor of Arts Fordham University
- Occupation: Businessman – shipping – real estate
- Parent(s): Harry N. Notias, Phyllis Thravalos

Nicholas X. Notias (Greek: Νικόλαος Χ. Νοτιάς; born 1966) is an American businessman, shipowner and ship-manager, owner of Seabridge Chartering LLC located in Wall Street, Vice President and director of operations of Independence Maritime Agency Inc. and Trojan Maritime Inc. He's also a large shareholder of the real estate Notias Constructions Company, director of operations of Cardiff Holdings Inc., director of operations of Liverpool Holdings Inc., and until June 2013, the major shareholder and Vice President of the famous Greek football club AEK Athens.

== Family and education ==
Son of the late Harry N. Notias and Phyllis Thravalos, he had a beloved sister named Irene. His father, "Captain Harry" as he was fondly known, immigrated in the early 1940s from the Greek island Chios and became a US citizen. He was a selfmade man who achieved the American dream. He came from a close-knit family of modest means, became a captain in the U.S. Maritime Service and later founded a successful shipping business, Independence Maritime Agency Inc., with offices in New York and Greece. Nicholas followed his father roots and values, and after graduating with a Bachelor of Arts (1988) and a Master of Business Administration (1990) from Fordham University, took over the family business. Nikos Notias is married to Maria C. Los, Deputy Chairman of Christie's Auction Houses and Head of Client Advisory Americas at Christie's Auction Houses.

== Shipping and business success ==
Nikos Notias has extensive experience in the day to day commercial operations of dry-bulk carriers (handymax / panamax), time/voyage charters, charter party disputes, laytime issues, ship S&P, insurance placement (H&M, P&I, War Risk), claims experience in cargo, P/A & G/A, technical experience in ship repairs and repair contracts, paint coatings and dry-dockings. Yachting industry experience for motor yachts including brokerage, construction and transport. Also expert in chartering of a fleet of dry bulk carriers engaged in the international transport of bulk commodities worldwide.

== Professional associations ==
- Maritime Arbitrator – Society of Maritime Arbitrators, Inc. – New York City (2001–present)
- Supporting Member of Liaison Committee – The London Maritime Arbitrators Association (2003–present)
- Chairman USA Advisory Committee – Lloyd's Register North America (Member 1995–present: Chairman 2004–Present)
- Member – American Bureau of Shipping – (1995–present)

== AEK Athens involvement ==
With AEK struggling terribly in corruption and the prospect of relegation to the fourth division looming, Demis Nikolaidis (ex club charismatic player) supported by the majority of AEK fans, established a consortium of businessmen such as Polys V. Hajioannou, Petros Pappas and Takis Kanellopoulos, who convinced Nikos Notias to participate in the project. The approach was made by Ghikas Goumas, grandson of the late Nikos Goumas (former President of the club). At the first contact, which was held in New York City, Nikos Notias was convinced that the operators had pure purposes, and a great vision for the club's regeneration. Small doubts initially led Notias to take a small percentage of shares (about 8%) but he changed his mind quickly, when he realized that the fans totally backed-up the effort and gradually, over a period of three and a half years, he became the major holder of the shares, reaching 35%. His financial assistance to the club amounts to €18 million but the largest and most expected project of Nikos Notias, remains the club's Sports Center which will cost over €25 million. It will be the biggest project in the modern history of the club and Notias's intention is to name it "Harry Notias" in honour of his father. Among the tremendous economic crisis in Greece and due to the club's financial problems, AEK Athens in June 2013 declared bankruptcy and was self-relegated to the amateur third division. The Athletic Center of Spata nowadays includes state of the art facilities, three fields (one of them with synthetic turf) for soccer, a fitness and health center with weight-training and fitness rooms, a cryotherapy center and more. Unfortunately, the rest of the project (the club's Museum, Hotel, Aquatic Center and two more soccer fields) could not be delivered and remained unfinished.
