= El Hadji Diouf (footballer, born 1988) =

Senegalese footballer

Personal information
- Full name: El Hadji Diouf
- Date of birth: 20 August 1988 (age 38)
- Place of birth: Dakar, Senegal
- Height: 1.84 m (6 ft 0 in)
- Position: Midfielder

Youth career
- 2000–2004: ASC Xam-Xam

Senior career*
Years	Team	Apps	(Gls)
2004–2007	ASC Xam-Xam	50	(6)
2007–2011	AEK Athens	9	(0)
2008	→ Ilisiakos (loan)	13	(2)
2008–2009	→ Anagennisi Karditsa (loan)	7	(0)
2009	→ Vitória de Setúbal (loan)	3	(0)
2010	→ Szombathelyi Haladás (loan)	3	(0)
2011–2012	FC Botoșani	6	(1)
2013	FK Čáslav	7	(0)
2015–2016	AFK Tišnov		
2016	→ FK Blansko (loan)		
2016–2017	FC Champel		
2017–2018	FC Kosova Genève		
- * Club domestic league appearances and goals as of 12 December 2025

El Hadji Diouf (born 20 August 1988) is a Senegalese former footballer, who played as a midfielder.

== Career ==
Diouf was discovered by AEK's Dutch scout Eugène Gerards, the young Senegalese midfielder left local club ASC Xam-Xam for AEK Athens in 2007. Diouf began playing with the youth team and has been on four loan stints. He made his senior team debut for AEK on February 25, 2009 against Skoda Xanthi in the Greek Football Cup quarter-finals. Coming on in the 80th minute he provided a much needed spark off the bench which led to AEK scoring the winning goal. He made his league debut three days later, again, against Skoda Xanthi.
