= Gilberto Neto =

Brazilian footballer (born 1993)

Personal information
- Full name: Gilberto Trindade de Souza Neto
- Date of birth: 26 June 1993 (age 33)
- Place of birth: Gandu, Brazil
- Height: 1.79 m (5 ft 10 in)
- Position: Forward

Team information
- Current team: Patrocinense (on loan from Marcílio Dias)

Youth career
- Marília

Senior career*
Years	Team	Apps	(Gls)
2012–2015	Marília	9	(0)
2015–2018	Ituano	0	(0)
2016	→ Oulu (loan)	24	(2)
2017	→ Marília (loan)	0	(0)
2017	→ Guarani de Palhoça (loan)	5	(0)
2018	→ Maringá (loan)	3	(0)
2019–	Marcílio Dias	0	(0)
2019	→ Joinville (loan)	5	(0)
2019	→ Camboriú (loan)		
2020–	→ Patrocinense (loan)	0	(0)
- * Club domestic league appearances and goals as of 22:21, 13 July 2019 (UTC)

Gilberto Trindade de Souza Neto (born 26 June 1993), known as Gilberto Neto or simply Gilberto, is a Brazilian professional footballer who plays as a forward for Patrocinense on loan from Marcílio Dias.

== Career statistics ==
As of 20 January 2017

Club	Season	League			State League		Cup		Continental		Other		Total	
Club	Season	Division	Apps	Goals	Apps	Goals	Apps	Goals	Apps	Goals	Apps	Goals	Apps	Goals
Marília	2014	Paulista A2	—		10	3	—		—		—		10	3
Marília	2015	Paulista	—		12	0	—		—		—		12	0
Marília	Subtotal		—		22	3	—		—		—		22	3
Ituano	2015	Paulista	—		—		2	0	—		13 (Note: All appearance(s) in Copa Paulista)	0	15	0
Oulu	2016	Ykkönen	24	2	—		—		—		—		24	2
Career total			24	2	22	3	2	0	0	0	13	0	61	5
