= Panthrakikos F.C. =

Association football club in Greece

Panthrakikos
- Full name: Αθλητικός Ποδοσφαιρικός Σύλλογος Πανθρακικός
- Nickname: Kροκόδειλοι (Crocodiles)
- Founded: 1963; 63 years ago
- Ground: Komotini Municipal Stadium
- Capacity: 6,198
- Investor: Nikolaos Pachoumis
- Chairman: Charalampos Sakaris
- Manager: Giannis Apostolidis
- League: Super League Greece 2
- 2025–26: Gamma Ethniki (Group 1), 1st (promoted)
- Website: Club Website
Home colours	Away colours

Panthrakikos Football Club (Greek: Α.Π.Σ. Πανθρακικός) is a Greek football club based in Komotini, Thrace in North Eastern Greece founded in 1964. The club competed in Super League Greece during the 2008–09 season for the first time.

== History ==
=== Early years (1964–2001) ===
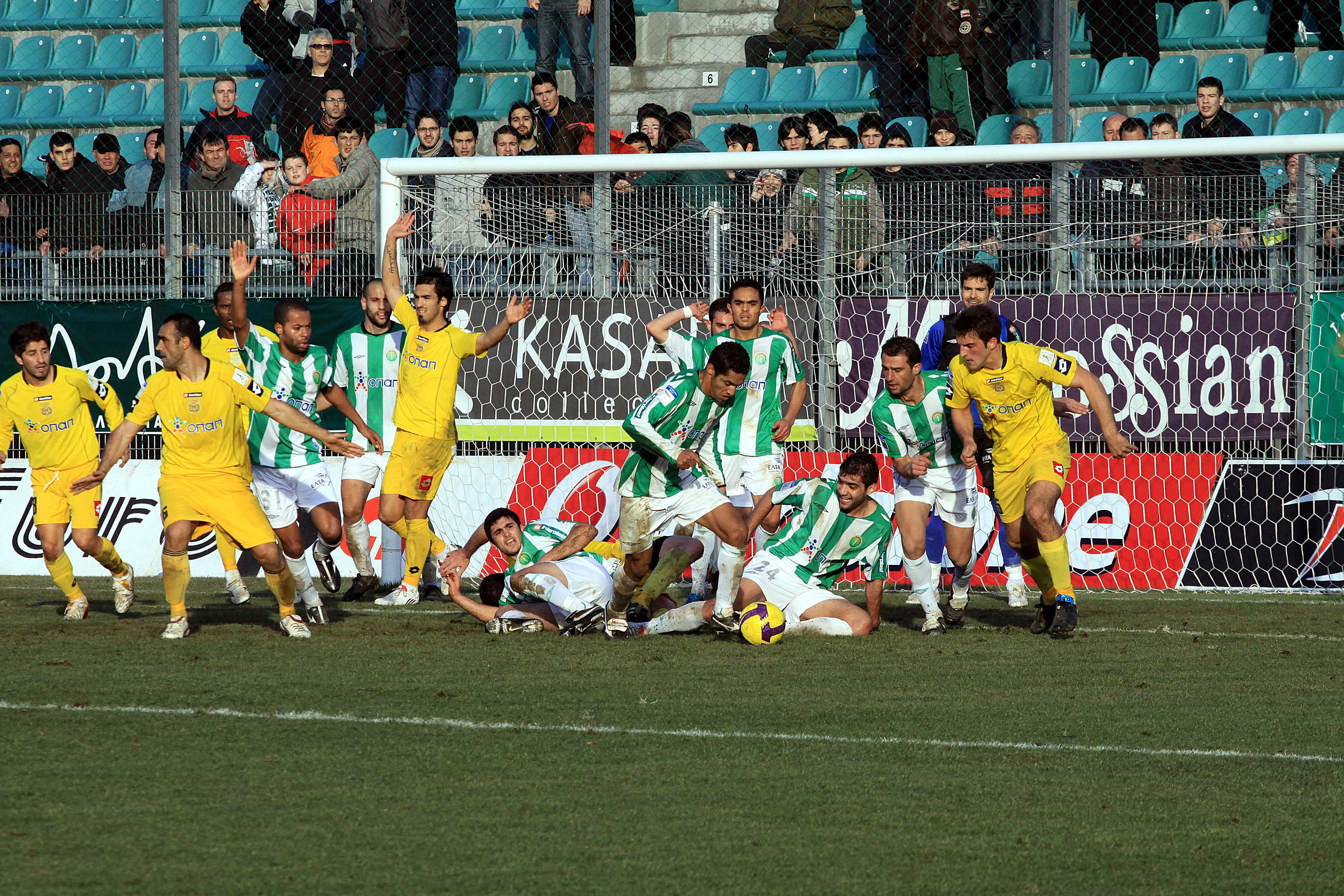
Panthrakikos vs Ergotelis, 2009–10

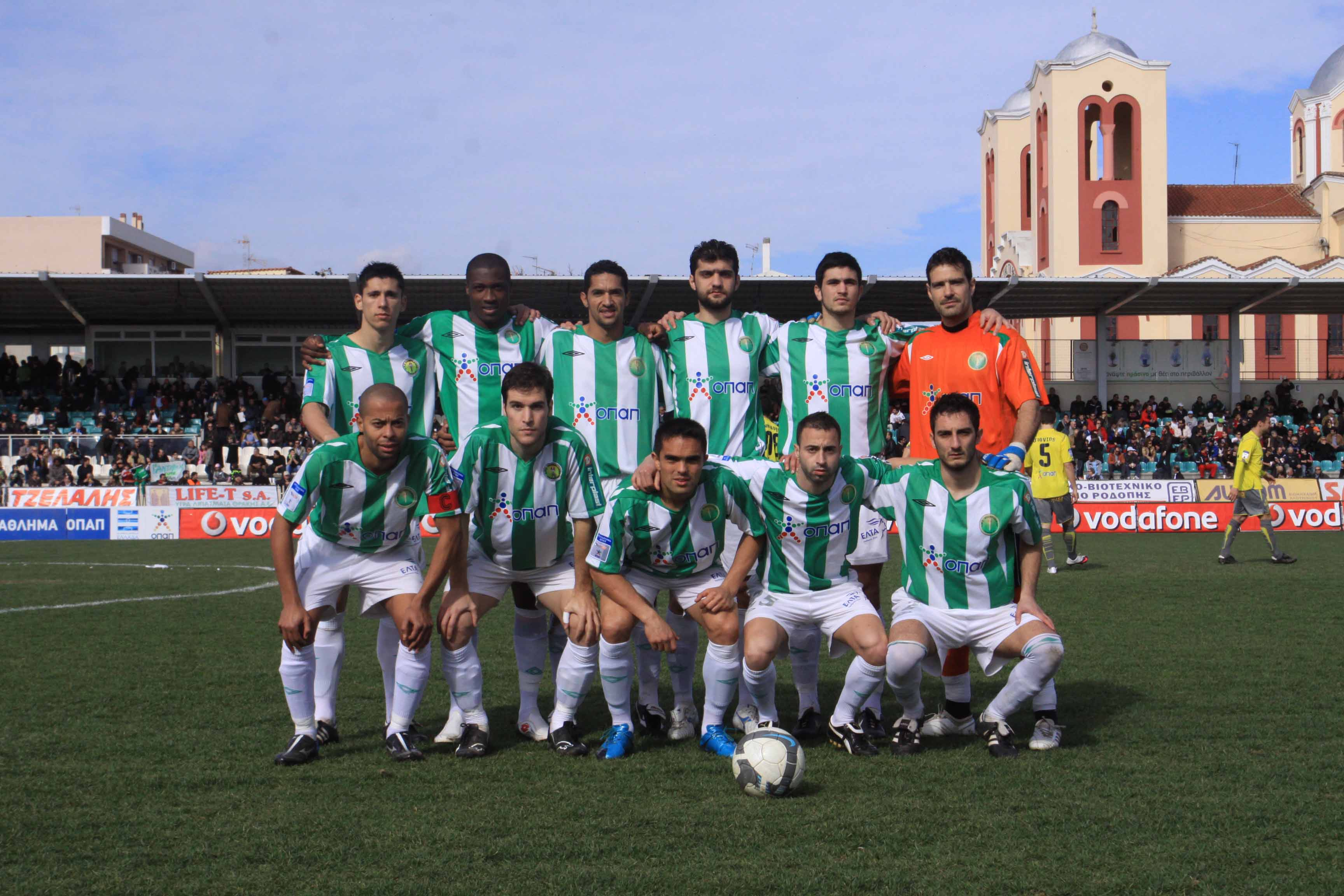
Panthrakikos F.C., 2009–10

Panthrakikos F.C. was formed in the town of Komotini in 1964. Athlitiki Enosis Komotini (Athletic Union of Komotini) which was founded in 1936, and Orpheus Komotini which was founded in 1948 were merged with Panthrakikos. The club participated in regional leagues until 1969, when they joined the Beta Ethniki. They stayed in this division until being relegated in 1978, but were promoted back to Beta Ethniki after a single season. They remained here until 1983. Panthrakikos finished 1982–83 12th in Beta Ethniki, but were relegated to Gamma Ethniki due to restructuring of the leagues. In 1983–84 they finished 18th position and were further relegated to Delta Ethniki. The club was promoted again to the Gamma Ethniki, and participated there in 1985–86 and 1986–87. Relegation to Delta Ethniki followed the end of the 1986–87 season. After relegation in 1995-1996, Panthrakikos merged with Orpheus Xylagani and competed as Panthrakikos Xylagani on the founding status of Xylagani during the years 1996–1998. Competed again as Panthrakikos F.C. in lowest level of local leagues during the years 1998-2001, without any administration and without any investment. In that period, very few fans were take charge of administration.

=== New era (2001–present) ===
In 2001-2003 Panagiotis Margaritis take charge of administration as chairman and Sakis Skoulis as manager. They were promoted two consecutive seasons, reaching the Delta Ethniki in 2003.
In 2004 prompting significant investment into the club from local entrepreneurs Thodoris Savakis, Tasos Karaolanis & Yiannis Kitzidis. Kostas Vasilakakis, a former player of Panthrakikos, was hired as manager in the summer of 2004. In season 2004–05 Panthrakikos were champions of Delta Ethniki and were again promoted, to the Gamma Ethniki. A third-place finish in 2005–06 saw them promoted once more, to the Beta Ethniki.
Three managers were hired in the first half of the season 2006-2007. Zisis Tsekos, Dimitrios Kalaitzidis and Yiannis Gounaris, were fired to be replaced by manager Kostas Vasilakakis and lead the club to an 11th-place finish. Panthrakikos started the 2007–08 season with a breach of league rules in their opening game, against Chaidari, and were penalised by a four-point reduction. Despite this penalty, Panthrakikos beat Ilisiakos 1–0 in the final game of the season to overtake PAS Giannina, finish third and gain promotion to Super League Greece for the first time. Emilio Ferrera, was hired as manager in the summer of 2008, lead Panthrakikos to an 11th place finish in their first Super League season.
On January 25, 2017, Panthrakikos withdrew from the Football League (Level 2) due to financial problems after the 12th game of the period.

After competing in the Regional Amateur League of Thrace for over 4 years, Panthrakikos got promoted once again to Gamma Ethniki and competing in the competition for the 2022–23 football season.

Panthrakikos competed in the Gamma Ethniki until the 2025–26 season, when it finished in 1st place in Group 1, earning a spot in the promotion play-offs. There, it finished in 2nd place and secured promotion to Super League 2 (the renamed Beta Ethniki) for the first time after a 9-year absence from professional football. Meanwhile, during the same season, Panthrakikos reached the final of the Greek Football Amateur Cup, but lost 2–1 to Trikala in the final match.

== Facilities ==
=== Stadium ===
The "Municipal Athletic Center" (ΔΑΚ – Δημοτικό Αθλητικό Κέντρο) was built in 1923 by the Hellenic Army near the railway station of Komotini. Panthrakikos has played there since 1963.

The northern grandstand was built in 1950 (rebuilt 1963–1965) with a capacity of about 2,500 while the southern grandstand was built in 1970 with a capacity of about 1,500. The northern grandstand and southern grandstand were rebuilt in 2008 with a capacity of 1,608 (1,377 seats for gate 1 plus 231 seats for gate 7) and 1,090 (gate 5) respectively. In the southern grandstand at the back of, there is a big booth for the Radio and TV journalists (gate 4). Also there is special area for disabled (gate 3). The western grandstand was built in 2008 with a capacity of 2,002 (gate 6 – guests). Finally, the eastern grandstand was built in 2009 with a capacity of 1,498 (gate 2). The total capacity of OPAP-Municipal Komotini Stadium is 6,198 seats.

=== Panthrakikos Athletic Center ===
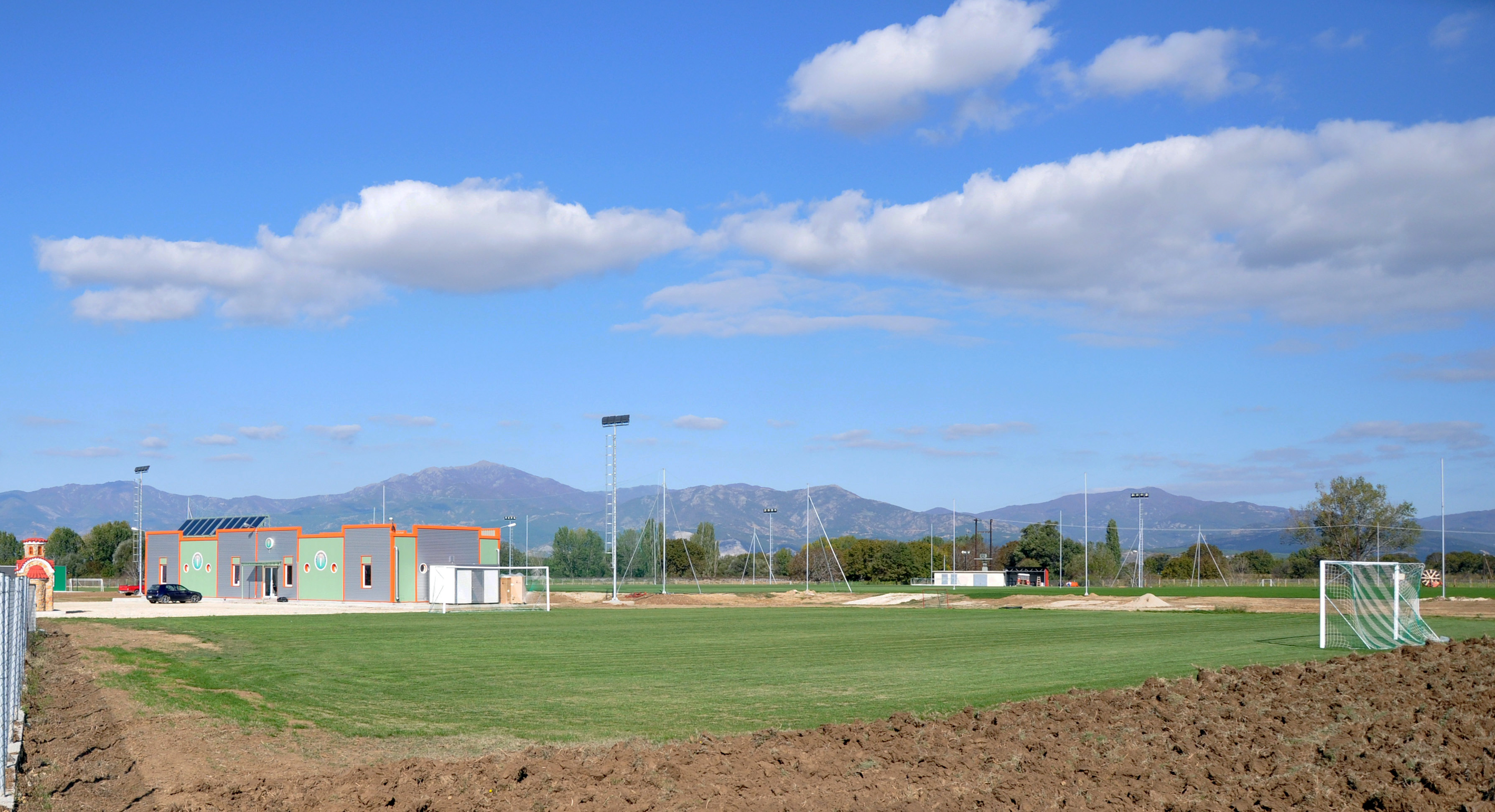
Panthrakikos Athletic Center

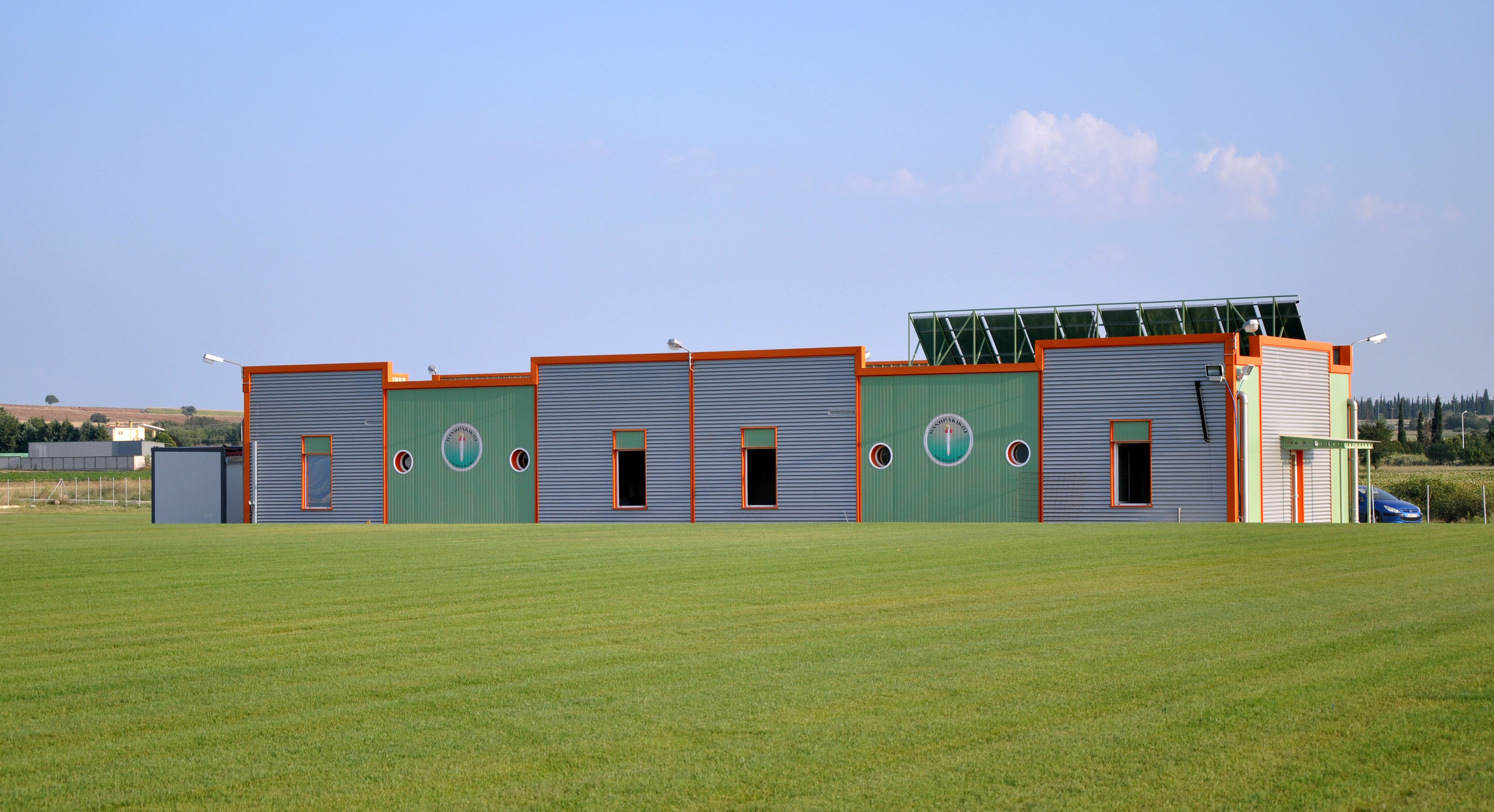
The main building of Panthrakikos Athletic Center

The training center is called "Panthrakikos Athletic Center". It covers a field of 42,000 sq.m. located 4 km east of Komotini at Kikidio village.

The main building covers 360 sq.m.. Includes the administration office, the press room, first aid station, physiotherapy chamber and locker room. Three full-sized terrains (two with natural turf, one with synthetic turf) are used for the first squad trainings. A half-sized terrain is also used for the goalkeepers training.

Another building 200 sq.m., which includes locker room, showers and dining room for the Youth team and the football academies. Two half-sized terrains and one full-sized are used by the Youth Teams.

== Players ==
=== Current squad ===
As of 18 August 2026

Note: Flags indicate national team as defined under FIFA eligibility rules; some limited exceptions apply. Players may hold more than one non-FIFA nationality.

No.	Pos.	Nation	Player
1	GK	GRE	Panagiotis Paiteris
3	DF	ARG	Juan Larrea (captain)
4	DF	GRE	Christos Sapnaras
5	MF	GRE	Nikos Peios
6	DF	GRE	Giannis Pechlivanopoulos
7	MF	GRE	Georgios Papakonstantinou
8	MF	GRE	Christos Voutsas
9	FW	GRE	Apostolos Sarantidis
10	MF	GRE	Christos Pachoumis
11	MF	GRE	Georgios Zonios
12	DF	GRE	Aristotelis Kollaras
14	DF	GRE	Athanasios Giannarakis
16	MF	GRE	Sarantis Tselempakis
17	MF	NGR	Chilem Williams Ignatius

No.	Pos.	Nation	Player
19	MF	GRE	Stefanos Routsis
20	DF	GRE	Angelos Zioulis
21	MF	GRE	Andreas Athanasakopoulos
22	MF	GRE	Florian Debrova
24	DF	GRE	Paraskevas Doumanis
25	DF	GRE	Koroneos Sevastidis
26	MF	ARG	Santiago Patroni
27	MF	GRE	Vangelis Anastasopoulos
30	DF	GRE	Aleksey Chayka
31	GK	GRE	Charalampos Tasidis
33	GK	GRE	Fotis Sgouris
46	FW	GEO	Vasilios Gordeziani
64	FW	GRE	Georgios Notas
77	MF	GRE	Kyriakos Pachoumis

== Honours ==
- Football League
  - Champions (1): 2011–12
- Gamma Ethniki
  - Winners (2): 1978–79, 2025–26
- Delta Ethniki
  - Winners (2): 1984–85, 2004–05
- Thrace FCA First Division
  - Winners (5): 1964–65, 1988–89, 1994–95, 2002–03, 2021–22
- Thrace FCA Cup
  - Winners (14): 1984–85, 1987–88, 1988–89, 1989–90, 1990–91, 1991–92, 1993–94, 2003–04, 2004–05, 2019–20, 2021–22, 2022–23, 2023–24, 2024–25

== Notable players ==
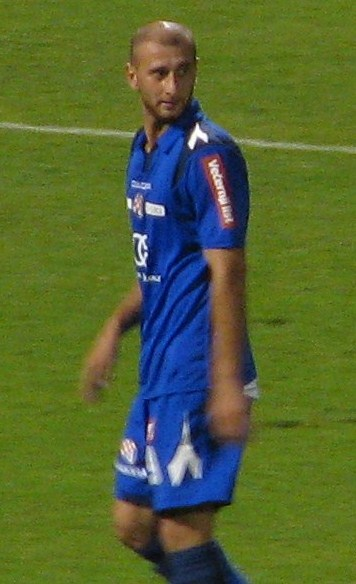
Dimitrios Papadopoulos

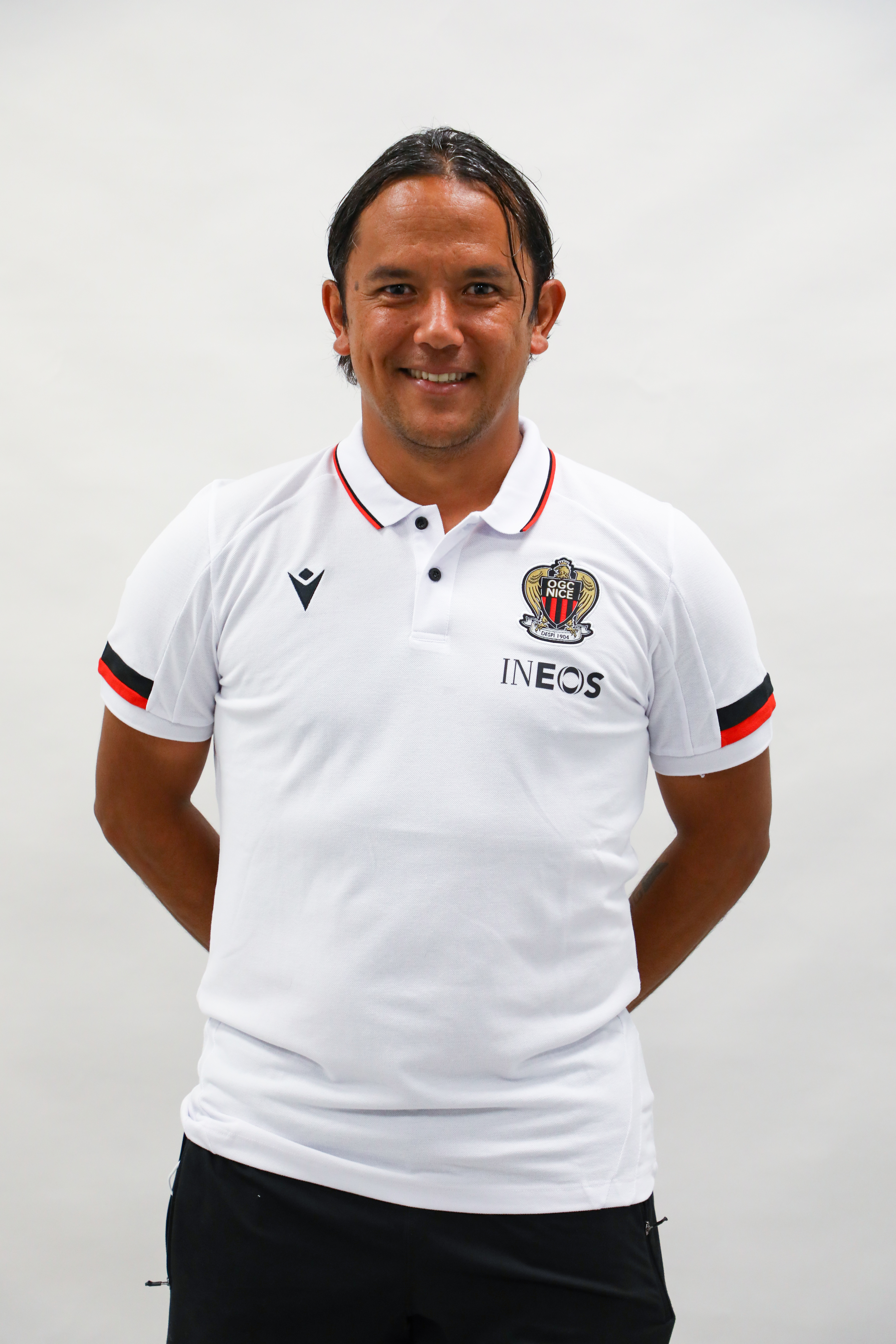
Marama Vahirua

== Players statistics ==
=== Appearances and goals from 2006–present ===
Only with Panthrakikos F.C. As of 18 April 2016 according to combined sources

Nat	Name	Career	Level 1		Level 2		Nat Cup		Total
Nat	Name	Career	app	goals	app	goals	app	goals	app	goals
(Turkey)	Deniz Baykara	2011–16	111	5	31	6	14	1	156	12
(Greece)	Antonis Ladakis	2012–16	85	2			4	0	89	2
(Brazil)	Igor	2013–16	77	24			3	1	80	25
(Greece)	Thanasis Papageorgiou	2013–16	74	2			8	0	82	2
(Greece)	Christos Tzanis	2012–16	73	14			8	3	81	17
(Greece)	Giannis Christou	2011–16	70	1	27	1	12	0	109	2
(Greece)	Dimitris Hasomeris	2013–16	68	3			7	2	75	5
(Senegal)	Pape M'Bow	2013–15	59	2			5	0	64	2
(Greece)	Ioannis Potouridis	2014–16	57	0			5	0	62	0
(Greece)	Giorgos Athanasiadis	2013–16	57	0			3	0	60	0
(France)	Nicolas Diguiny	2014–16	55	8			2	0	57	8
(Greece)	Achilleas Sarakatsanos	2011–14	48	0	27	1	8	1	83	2
(Spain)	José María Cases	2013–15	47	10			3	0	50	10
(Greece)	Yiannis Kanotidis	2007–11	40	1	43	0	4	0	87	1
(France)	Ludovic Clément	2008–10	38	2					38	2
(Burkina Faso)	Abdul Diallo	2006–10	37	5	47	12	4	0	88	17
(Portugal)	Manuel Lopes	2007–11	37	1	39	1	1	0	77	2
(Argentina)	Munafo Horta	2009–13	32	1	25	1	9	0	66	2
(Greece)	Spyros Vrontaras	2004–10 & 2012–13	28	0	40	0	2	0	70	0
(Argentina)	Adrián Lucero	2012–13	28	4			6	2	34	6
(Spain)	Sito Riera	2008–09	28	5			1	0	29	5
(French Polynesia)	Marama Vahirua	2012–13	26	3			4	2	30	5
(France)	Bertrand Robert	2009–11	25	4	28	8			53	12
(Greece)	Dimitrios Papadopoulos	2012–13	25	11			5	1	30	12
(Greece)	Fotis Konstantinidis	2005–09	22	1	54	4	8	0	84	5
(Greece)	Dimitris Koutsopoulos	2010–14	22	0	55	0	7	0	84	0
(Greece)	Christos Mingas	2011–13	22	0	26	7	9	0	57	7
(Brazil)	Robinho	2005–09	18	0	57	0	7	0	82	0
(Greece)	Nikos Bacharidis	2001–10	16	1	23	0	7	1	46	2
(Hungary)	Gábor Erős	2006–08			57	9	2	0	59	9
(Greece)	Dimitris Souanis	2005–08			53	12	4	2	57	14
(Greece)	Nikos Soultanidis	2010–12			53	14	3	3	56	17
(Netherlands)	Ronny van Es	2007–08			21	10	1	0	22	10

=== Former players ===
- Former players with Wikipedia article see Category:Panthrakikos F.C. players.

Former players without Wikipedia article, based on their long-term presence in Panthrakikos, players worthy of mention are Filippos Aivazis (1967–84) who holds the record for most appearances (405) and most goals (89) in the Beta and Gamma Ethniki, Apostolos Hatziioannidis - Apostolakis (1956-64 Orfeas Komotini, 1964-69 AO Kavala, 1967-77 Panthrakikos F.C.), Zacharias Tilios (1964–76), Stavros Svintridis, Christos Doulgerakis, Archontis Katsaridis, Manolis Rakitzoglou, Vasilis Fotidis, Kostas Kalaitzidis and Kostas Vasilakakis (1973–81).

== Chairmen and managers ==
season	chairman	manager	level	rank
2001–02	Panagiotis Margaritis	(Greece) Sakis Skoulis	6	1
2002–03	Panagiotis Margaritis	(Greece) Sakis Skoulis	5	1
2003–04	Panagiotis Margaritis	(Greece) Antonis Michalakopoulos	4	5
2004–05	Yiannis Kitzidis	(Greece) Kostas Vasilakakis	4	1
2005–06	Yiannis Kitzidis	(Greece) Kostas Vasilakakis	3	3
2006–07	Yiannis Kitzidis	(Greece) Zisis Tsekos (Greece) Dimitris Kalaitzidis (Greece) Yiannis Gounaris (Greece) Kostas Vasilakakis	2	11
2007–08	Yiannis Kitzidis	(Greece) Kostas Vasilakakis	2	3
2008–09	Yiannis Kitzidis	(Belgium) Emilio Ferrera (Jun 5, 2008 – Jun 30, 2009)	1	11
2009–10	Yiannis Kitzidis; Dimitris Tzelepis	(Romania) Ilie Dumitrescu (Jul 1, 2009–Sep 20, 2009) (France) Albert Cartier (Sep 20, 2009–Jan 12, 2010) (Greece) Pavlos Dermitzakis (Jan 12, 2010–Jul 22, 2010)	1	16
2010–11	Dimitris Tzelepis	(Greece) Kostas Vasilakakis (Jul 25, 2010–Nov 10) (Belgium) Emilio Ferrera (Nov 7, 2010 – Mar 25, 2011) (Greece) Savas Pantelidis (Mar 30, 2011 – Oct 29, 2012)	2	7
2011–12	Dimitris Tzelepis	(Greece) Savas Pantelidis	2	1
2012–13	Dimitris Tzelepis	(Greece) Savas Pantelidis (Greece) Pavlos Dermitzakis (Oct 31, 2012 – Apr 30, 2013)	1	10
2013–14	Dimitris Tzelepis	(Greece) Apostolos Mantzios (May 9, 2013 – Nov 5, 2014)	1	10
2014–15	Dimitris Tzelepis	(Greece) Apostolos Mantzios (Spain) José Manuel Roca (Nov 10, 2014 – Sep 16, 2015)	1	12
2015–16	Dimitris Tzelepis	(Spain) José Manuel Roca (Greece) Dimitrios Eleftheropoulos (Sep 19, 2015 – ) (Greece) Giannis Hatzinikolaou (Jan 26, 2016 – ) (Serbia) Zoran Stoinović (Mar 16, 2016 – )	1	15
2016–17	Dimitris Tzelepis	(Greece) Kostas Anifantakis (– Dec 8, 2016) (Greece) Kostas Vasilakakis (Dec 10, 2016 – Jan 25, 2017)	2	18
2017–18	Manolis Sakalis	(Greece) Vangelis Kyrialanis	5	2
2018–19	Nikolaos Pachoumis	(Greece) Kostas Gemenetzis	4	3
2019–20	Nikolaos Pachoumis	(Greece) Kostas Gemenetzis	4	

== Crest and colours ==
Panthrakikos crest is a sparkling flaming torch in a circle. The torch is surrounded by the club's name and the year of establishment. The club crest sits on the left side of the chest. Traditional club's colors are green and white.

Traditional colours

2007–08	2009–10	2010–11	2011–12	2012–13	2013–14	2014–15

Alternative colours

2007–08	2008–09	2008–09B	2013–14	2014–15
