= Spyros Vrontaras =

Greek footballer

Personal information
- Full name: Spyridon Vrontaras
- Date of birth: 11 December 1984 (age 41)
- Place of birth: Thessaloniki, Greece
- Height: 1.86 m (6 ft 1 in)
- Position: Goalkeeper

Youth career
- 2002–2004: Panthrakikos

Senior career*
Years	Team	Apps	(Gls)
2004–2010	Panthrakikos	61	(0)
2010–2011	Xanthi	0	(0)
2011–2012	Fokikos	22	(0)
2012–2013	Panachaiki	1	(0)
2013	Panthrakikos	6	(0)
2013–2014	Kerkyra	24	(0)
2014–2016	Apollon Pontus	20	(0)
2016	Niki Volos	6	(0)
2016–2018	Panachaiki	28	(0)
2018	Kavala	0	(0)
2019–2022	Aiolikos	33	(0)
2022–2023	Olympiacos Volos	0	(0)
2023	Magnisiakos		
2024–2025	Anagennisi Mantoudi		
- * Club domestic league appearances and goals

Spyros Vrontaras (Greek: Σπύρος Βρονταράς; born 11 December 1984) is a Greek football who plays as a goalkeeper.

== Career ==
Born in Thessaloniki, Vrontaras began playing football for Panthrakikos in 2004, winning 2 elevations from Gamma Ethniki to Super League Greece with the team. After two seasons in Super League with Panthrakikos, he signed a professional contract with Xanthi when Panthrakikos relegated to Beta Ethniki. After one season with no entries he became a free agent. In 2012, he signed a six months professional contract with Fokikos after a good season, and in the summer of 2012 signed a professional contract for Panahaiki. Vrontaras left Panachaiki in January 2013 and returned to Panthrakikos.

On 30 September 2019, Vrontaras joined Aiolikos.
