= Anestis Nastos =

Greek footballer

Personal information
- Date of birth: 28 April 1989 (age 37)
- Place of birth: Athens, Greece
- Height: 1.82 m (6 ft 0 in)
- Position: Centre-back

Team information
- Current team: Panachaiki
- Number: 6

Youth career
- –2007: Ilisiakos

Senior career*
Years	Team	Apps	(Gls)
2007–2009	Ilisiakos	22	(0)
2009–2010	Egaleo	20	(0)
2010–2011	Niki Volos	0	(0)
2011–2012	Ethnikos Asteras	11	(1)
2012	Kerkyra	1	(0)
2013	Fokikos	23	(1)
2013	Paniliakos	12	(1)
2014–2015	Panegialios	31	(1)
2015–2016	Olympiacos Volos	11	(0)
2016–2020	OFI	94	(0)
2020–2022	Rapid București	21	(0)
2022–2023	Aiolikos		
2023–	Panachaiki	0	(0)
- * Club domestic league appearances and goals as of 18:37, 31 January 2022 (UTC)

Anestis Nastos (Greek: Ανέστης Νάστος; born 28 April 1989) is a Greek professional footballer who plays as a centre-back for Super League 2 club Panachaiki.

== Early career ==
Nastos started his career from the academies of Ilisiakos and he then signed for the seniors team.

== Club career ==
Nastos started his career in Ilisiakos F.C. and after 2 years in which he made 23 appearances without scoring a single goal, he signed for Egaleo, from which he left 1 year later. He then moved to Volos for the side of Niki Volos He left after 1 season in which he made just 1 appearance. During the 2011–12 season he signed for Ethnikos Asteras F.C. in which he scored his first, but he left after just 1 season to sign for AO Kerkyra. But after just 6 months, he left to sign for Fokikos A.C. During the 2013–14 and 2014–15 seasons he played for Paniliakos F.C. and Panegialios F.C. Where he had a total of 46 appearances and 2 goals. In 2015, he signed for Olympiacos Volos before moving to the historic side of Crete, OFI 1 year later. During the 2019–20 season, he was the captain of OFI in the Greek Super League.

== Honours ==
OFI

- Football League: 2017–18
