= Olivier N'Siabamfumu =

French footballer (born 1986)

Personal information
- Full name: Olivier Muntenau N'Siabamfumu
- Date of birth: 17 March 1986 (age 40)
- Place of birth: Meaux, France
- Height: 1.85 m (6 ft 1 in)
- Position: Midfielder

Youth career
- 1999–2002: Clairefontaine
- 2002–2005: Stade Rennais

Senior career*
Years	Team	Apps	(Gls)
2005–2006	Stade Rennais	0	(0)
2006–2008	Ascoli	2	(0)
2009	AEK Athens	2	(0)
2009	Crotone	1	(0)
2009–2010	Carrarese	7	(0)
2010–2011	Colmar	3	(0)
2011	Strømmen IF	9	(1)
2013	Kristiansund	27	(0)

International career
2005	France U19		
- * Club domestic league appearances and goals

Olivier Muntenau N'Siabamfumu (born 17 March 1986) is a French former professional footballer who played as a midfielder.

== Club career ==
N'Siabamfumu started his professional career at Stade Rennais without playing. He then caught the eye of Italian side Ascoli. His first season was not successful since he had a serious injury and released in summer 2008. In January he signed a trial deal to AEK Athens later a contract for six months

In 2009, he signed a two-year contract with Crotone, but just after one game played he was acquired by Carrarese.

In August 2010, he trailed for Colmar.

In March 2013, N'Siabamfumu signed for Norwegian side Kristiansund BK, after first have failed a trial with first division side Sarpsborg 08.

== International career ==
N'Siabamfumu is a former member of the France U19 national team and participant of the 2005 UEFA European Under-19 Football Championship.

== Personal life ==
His brother, Régis is also a former footballer and member of Strasbourg.

== Honours ==
France U19

- UEFA European Under-19 Championship: 2005
