= Panagiotis Zorbas =

Greek footballer (born 1987

Personal information
- Date of birth: 21 April 1987 (age 39)
- Place of birth: Athens, Greece
- Height: 1.77 m (5 ft 10 in)
- Position: Attacking midfielder

Youth career
- Fortuna Düsseldorf
- –2005: Bayer 04 Leverkusen
- 2005–2006: Bayer 04 Leverkusen

Senior career*
Years	Team	Apps	(Gls)
2005–2011	AEK Athens	6	(0)
2006–2007	→ Niki Volos (loan)	23	(0)
2007–2008	→ Panetolikos (loan)	31	(9)
2009	→ Panetolikos (loan)	10	(4)
2009–2011	→ OFI (loan)	53	(6)
2011–2013	OFI	32	(0)
2013–2019	Kerkyra	135	(8)
2019–2020	Triglia	17	(1)
2020–2021	AE Moschato		
2021–2022	Kilkisiakos		
- * Club domestic league appearances and goals as of 12 August 2020

Panagiotis Zorbas (Greek: Παναγιώτης Ζορμπάς; born 21 April 1987) is a Greek former professional footballer who played as an attacking midfielder.

== Club career ==
Zorbas took his first steps in football in Germany, and the academies of Fortuna Düsseldorf and Bayer 04 Leverkusen. In the summer of 2005 he was scouted by the sport's director of AEK Athens, Ilija Ivić and was acquired by the Greek club. He spent his first season playing with the youth team and on 17 August 2006 he was loaned to Niki Volos. Afterwards he was loaned to Panetolikos, where was awarded the player of the year award for the South Group of Gamma Ethniki for the season 2007–08,. In the summer of 2008 he returned to AEK, but he got little playing time. Thus, on 29 January 2009 he was loaned again to Panetolikos and played a crucial part in helping the club return to the Beta Ethniki. Afterwards, Zorbas continued his career at Heraklion club OFI, initially as a two year long and then with a permanent transfer. On 30 July 2013 he signed for Kerkyra, where he spent most of his career. Afterwards Zorbas played a season for Triglia, AE Moschato and Kilkisiakos, where he retired in 2022.
