= Edinho (footballer, born July 1982) =

Portuguese footballer (born 1982)

Personal information
- Full name: Arnaldo Edi Lopes da Silva
- Date of birth: 7 July 1982 (age 44)
- Place of birth: Aveiro, Portugal
- Height: 1.82 m (6 ft 0 in)
- Position: Striker

Youth career
- 1992–1995: Almada
- 1995–1996: Vitória Setúbal
- 1996–2000: Almada

Senior career*
Years	Team	Apps	(Gls)
2000–2002	Almada	32	(6)
2002–2003	Barreirense	18	(2)
2003–2005	Braga B	50	(33)
2004–2007	Braga	6	(0)
2005–2006	→ Paços Ferreira (loan)	21	(2)
2006–2007	→ Gil Vicente (loan)	25	(6)
2007–2008	Vitória Setúbal	15	(6)
2008	→ AEK Athens (loan)	15	(6)
2008–2009	AEK Athens	29	(7)
2009–2013	Málaga	18	(2)
2010	→ PAOK (loan)	14	(1)
2011	→ Marítimo (loan)	9	(0)
2012–2013	→ Académica (loan)	40	(18)
2013–2014	Braga	11	(1)
2014	→ Kayseri Erciyesspor (loan)	15	(11)
2014–2015	Kayseri Erciyesspor	26	(10)
2015–2016	Şanlıurfaspor	28	(12)
2016–2018	Vitória Setúbal	59	(17)
2018–2019	Feirense	24	(5)
2019–2021	Cova Piedade	28	(8)
2021–2022	Torreense	10	(0)
2022	Villa Athletic	0	(0)
2023	Olímpico Montijo	11	(3)
Total		504	(156)

International career
2008	Portugal U21	3	(0)
2009–2014	Portugal	6	(3)
- * Club domestic league appearances and goals

Arnaldo Edi Lopes da Silva (born 7 July 1982), known as Edinho, is a Portuguese former professional footballer who played as a striker.

Over 11 seasons, he appeared in 185 Primeira Liga matches and scored a total of 49 goals for Braga (two spells), Paços de Ferreira, Vitória de Setúbal (twice) Marítimo, Académica and Feirense. He also played professionally in Greece, Spain and Turkey.

Edinho won six caps for Portugal in five years.

== Club career ==
Edinho was born in Aveiro, of Guinea-Bissauan descent. After making his professional debut with Braga, and playing there without much impact, he served two loans from 2005 to 2007; in the second, he scored six goals for Gil Vicente in the Segunda Liga.

Edinho was released by Braga prior to the start of the 2007–08 season, joining Vitória de Setúbal in the Primeira Liga. In January 2008, he was loaned to AEK Athens in Greece; not an undisputed starter at the former, he put up impressive performances for the latter in his first months, managing to net in five straight games, against Skoda Xanthi at home (3–0), at OFI Crete (4–1), at home against Aris (1–1) and away against Apollon Kalamarias (1–0), topping it with another in the 4–0 rout of arch-rivals Olympiacos.

On 6 May 2008, the move to AEK was made permanent in a €500,000 deal and Edinho started the new campaign in fashion, scoring once and winning a penalty kick against Panathinaikos in a 2–1 home win, in the first derby of the year.

Edinho signed with Málaga on 17 July 2009, for €900,000. After being irregularly used in the first half of the season, he was loaned for five months to PAOK in a return to Greece, with an option to make the move permanent for €1.2 million at its closure. He scored his first goal for the club in a 1–0 victory at Olympiacos, but returned to Andalusia in June 2010.

In December 2010, shortly after the arrival of manager Manuel Pellegrini, Edinho was deemed surplus to requirements at the La Liga side, alongside five other players, but finally stayed at the club. However, on 31 January of the following year, he was loaned to Marítimo in his country until the end of the season.

On 29 January 2012, without having made a single official appearance for Málaga during 2011–12, Edinho returned to Portugal with Académica de Coimbra having an option to make his loan signing permanent at the end of the campaign. He made his league debut on 13 February, playing 54 minutes as a substitute in a 0–2 home loss against Gil Vicente.

On 21 May 2013, Edinho signed a two-year contract with former club Braga. Again rarely played at the Estádio Municipal de Braga, he took his game to Turkey, where he represented Kayseri Erciyesspor (Süper Lig) and Şanlıurfaspor (TFF First League); he scored 11 goals in his first full season with the former, having previously been named their Player of the Year.

The 34-year-old Edinho returned to his country on 22 August 2016, joining Vitória de Setúbal on a two-year deal. He netted eight times in his debut campaign, helping to a 12th-place finish.

Edinho scored all of his team's goals in a 4–1 away win over Aves on 29 March 2018. In the ensuing summer, he signed a one-year deal with Feirense.

Edinho retired aged 41, following a short spell at amateurs Olímpico do Montijo; he previously was part of Villa Athletic Club, a short-lived Portalegre-based project. In July 2023, he was named Vitória de Setúbal's director of football.

== International career ==
In late March 2009, Edinho was called up by Portugal coach Carlos Queiroz for an important 2010 FIFA World Cup qualifier against Sweden and the subsequent friendly with South Africa. He made his debut in the latter in a 2–0 win in Lausanne, Switzerland: after a missed chance early in the second half, he made up in the ensuing corner kick by Deco in the 55th minute, charging into the area to close the scoring.

In March 2014, more than four years after his last international, Edinho was selected by manager Paulo Bento for a friendly against Cameroon. He played the second 45 minutes in the match in Leiria, contributing one goal to the 5–1 victory.

== Career statistics ==
=== Club ===
As of match played on 6 May 2018

Club	Season	League			Cup		Continental		Total	
Club	Season	Division	Apps	Goals	Apps	Goals	Apps	Goals	Apps	Goals
Barreirense	2002–03	Segunda Divisão	18	2	0	0	—		18	2
Braga	2003–04	Primeira Liga	1	0	0	0	—		1	0
Braga	2004–05	Primeira Liga	5	0	1	2	—		6	2
Braga	Total		6	0	1	2	—		7	2
Paços Ferreira (loan)	2005–06	Primeira Liga	21	2	1	0	—		22	2
Gil Vicente (loan)	2006–07	Segunda Liga	25	6	0	0	—		25	6
Vitória Setúbal	2007–08	Primeira Liga	15	6	8	2	—		23	8
AEK Athens	2007–08	Super League Greece	15	6			—		15	6
AEK Athens	2008–09	Super League Greece	29	7			1 (Note: Appearances in UEFA Europa League)	0	30	7
AEK Athens	Total		44	13			1	0	45	13
Málaga	2009–10	La Liga	10	2	3	1	—		13	3
Málaga	2010–11	La Liga	8	0	2	1	—		10	1
Málaga	Total		18	2	5	2	—		23	4
PAOK (loan)	2009–10	Super League Greece	14	1	0	0	—		14	1
Marítimo (loan)	2010–11	Primeira Liga	9	0	0	0	—		9	0
Académica (loan)	2011–12	Primeira Liga	13	5	2	0	—		15	5
Académica (loan)	2012–13	Primeira Liga	27	13	7	4	6	1	40	18
Académica (loan)	Total		40	18	9	4	6	1	55	23
Braga	2013–14	Primeira Liga	11	1	2	1	1	0	14	2
Kayseri Erciyesspor (loan)	2013–14	Süper Lig	15	11	0	0	—		15	11
Kayseri Erciyesspor	2014–15	Süper Lig	26	10	1	0	—		27	10
Kayseri Erciyesspor	Total		41	21	1	0	—		42	21
Şanlıurfaspor	2015–16	TFF First League	28	12	5	1	—		33	13
Vitória Setúbal	2016–17	Primeira Liga	26	8	6	1	—		32	9
Vitória Setúbal	2017–18	Primeira Liga	32	9	6	1	—		38	10
Vitória Setúbal	Total		58	17	12	2	—		70	19
Career total			348	103	44	14	8	1	393	118

=== International goals ===
Scores and results list Portugal's goal tally first.

Edinho: International goals
No.	Date	Venue	Opponent	Score	Result	Competition
1	31 March 2009	Stade Olympique de la Pontaise, Lausanne, Switzerland	South Africa	2–0	2–0	Friendly
2	14 October 2009	Estádio D. Afonso Henriques, Guimarães, Portugal	Malta	4–0	4–0	2010 FIFA World Cup qualification
3	5 March 2014	Estádio Dr. Magalhães Pessoa, Leiria, Portugal	Cameroon	4–1	5–1	Friendly

== Honours ==
Vitória Setúbal

- Taça da Liga: 2007–08; runner-up 2017–18

AEK

- Greek Football Cup runner-up: 2008–09

Académica

- Taça de Portugal: 2011–12
- Supertaça Cândido de Oliveira runner-up: 2012

Torreense

- Liga 3: 2021–22

Individual

- Primeira Liga Forward of the Month: August 2018
