= Dimitrios Kottaras =

Greek footballer

Personal information
- Full name: Dimitrios Kottaras
- Date of birth: 11 August 1975 (age 51)
- Place of birth: Goudi, Greece
- Height: 1.80 m (5 ft 11 in)
- Position: Goalkeeper

Senior career*
Years	Team	Apps	(Gls)
1999–2001	Trikala	22	(0)
2001	→ Nafpaktiakos Asteras (loan)	3	(0)
2001–2003	Egaleo	4	(0)
2004–2005	Kalamata	22	(0)
2005–2007	Chaidari	52	(0)
2007–2009	Panserraikos	42	(0)
2009	Pierikos	8	(0)
2010	Panserraikos	20	(0)
2010–2011	Ethnikos Asteras	12	(0)
2011–2012	Vyzas	12	(0)
2012–2013	Apollon Smyrnis	21	(0)
2013 –	Glyfada	1	(0)
- * Club domestic league appearances and goals as of 30 December 2012

Dimitrios Kottaras (Greek: Δημήτριος Κοτταράς; born 11 August 1975) is a Greek former professional footballer who played as a goalkeeper.

== Career ==
Born in Goudi, Kottaras began playing football in the youth side of Trikala He joined the professional team in July 1999, and made 18 Alpha Ethniki appearances in his first season. He would appear in another four top flight matches for Egaleo F.C. during a two-year stint with the club.

In the 2009–10 season, Kottaras started playing for Pierikos but moved in January 2010 to Panserraikos In July 2010, he signed a two-year contract with Ethnikos Asteras after achieving the promotion to the Super League with Panserraikos F.C.
