= Ludovic Clément =

Martiniquais footballer (born 1976)

Personal information
- Date of birth: 5 December 1976 (age 49)
- Place of birth: Fort-de-France, Martinique
- Height: 1.78 m (5 ft 10 in)
- Positions: Midfielder; defender

Senior career*
Years	Team	Apps	(Gls)
1996–2003	Châteauroux	138	(5)
2003–2005	Toulouse	38	(0)
2005–2008	Montpellier	57	(3)
2008–2010	Panthrakikos	38	(2)
Total		271	(10)

International career
2001–2010	Martinique		
- * Club domestic league appearances and goals

Ludovic Clément (born 5 December 1976), is a Martiniquais former professional footballer who played as a midfielder or defender for LB Châteauroux, Toulouse FC, Montpellier HSC in Ligue 1 and Ligue 2 and for Greek football club Panthrakikos F.C. in the Super League Greece.

== Club career ==
Clément was born in Fort-de-France, Martinique. He played for LB Châteauroux, Toulouse FC and Montpellier HSC in Ligue 1 and Ligue 2 in France and for Panthrakikos F.C. in Super League Greece.

== Career statistics ==
Appearances and goals by club, season and competition
Club	Season	League			Cup		Continental		Total	
Club	Season	Division	Apps	Goals	Apps	Goals	Apps	Goals	Apps	Goals
Châteauroux	1996–97	Ligue 2	3	0	0	0	0	0	3	0
Châteauroux	1997–98	Ligue 1	2	0	0	0	0	0	2	0
Châteauroux	1998–99	Ligue 2	30	0	0	0	0	0	30	0
Châteauroux	1999–2000	Ligue 2	17	0	0	0	0	0	17	0
Châteauroux	2000–01	Ligue 2	24	2	0	0	0	0	24	2
Châteauroux	2001–02	Ligue 2	35	2	0	0	0	0	35	2
Châteauroux	2002–03	Ligue 2	27	1	0	0	0	0	27	1
Châteauroux	Total		138	5	0	0	0	0	138	5
Toulouse	2003–04	Ligue 1	19	0	0	0	0	0	19	0
Toulouse	2004–05	Ligue 1	19	0	0	0	0	0	19	0
Toulouse	Total		38	0	0	0	0	0	38	0
Montpellier	2005–06	Ligue 2	20	1	0	0	0	0	20	1
Montpellier	2006–07	Ligue 2	15	1	0	0	0	0	15	1
Montpellier	2007–08	Ligue 2	22	1	0	0	0	0	22	11
Montpellier	Total		57	3	0	0	0	0	57	3
Panthrakikos	2008–09	Super League	23	2	0	0	0	0	23	2
Panthrakikos	2009–10	Super League	15	0	0	0	0	0	15	0
Panthrakikos	Total		38	2	0	0	0	0	38	12
Career total			271	10	0	0	0	0	271	10
