= Giannis Kanotidis =

Greek footballer

Personal information
- Full name: Ioannis Kanotidis
- Date of birth: 2 May 1979 (age 47)
- Place of birth: Agios Vasileios, Greece
- Height: 1.72 m (5 ft 8 in)
- Position: Defender

Senior career*
Years	Team	Apps	(Gls)
1997–1998	Tyrnavos	27	(3)
2000–2003	AEL	60	(2)
2003–2004	Olympiacos Volos	20	(1)
2004–2005	Kavala	26	(10)
2005–2007	Kastoria	55	(3)
2007	Kalamata	5	(0)
2008–2011	Panthrakikos	83	(1)
- * Club domestic league appearances and goals as of 21 July 2011

Giannis Kanotidis (Greek: Γιάννης Κανωτίδης; born 2 May 1979) is a Greek footballer. He currently plays for Panthrakikos F.C. in Beta Ethniki.

== Career ==
Career statistics

season	club	league	Championship		Nation cup		Europe cup		Total	
season	club	league	appear	goals	appear	goals	appear	goals	appear	goals
1997–98	Tyrnavos	Gamma Ethniki	27	3	0	0	0	0	27	3
2000–01	AEL	Beta Ethniki	18	0	0	0	0	0	18	0
2001–02	AEL	Gamma Ethniki	13	0	0	0	0	0	13	0
2002–03	AEL	Gamma Ethniki	29	2	0	0	0	0	29	2
2003–04	Olympiacos Volos	Beta Ethniki	20	1	0	0	0	0	20	1
2004–05	Kavala F.C.	Gamma Ethniki	26	10	0	0	0	0	26	10
2005–06	Kastoria F.C.	Beta Ethniki	25	2	0	0	0	0	25	2
2006–07	Kastoria F.C.	Beta Ethniki	30	1	0	0	0	0	30	1
2007	Kalamata F.C.	Beta Ethniki	5	0	0	0	0	0	5	0
2008	Panthrakikos	Beta Ethniki	20	0	0	0	0	0	20	0
2008–09	Panthrakikos	Super League	21	1	2	0	0	0	23	1
2009–10	Panthrakikos	Super League	19	0	1	0	0	0	20	0
2010–11	Panthrakikos	Beta Ethniki	23	0	1	0	0	0	24	0
2011–12										
career total			286	20	4	0	0	0	280	20

Last update: 21 July 2011
