= Gugu (footballer) =

Brazilian footballer (born 1985)

Personal information
- Full name: Luis Miguel Aparecido Alves
- Date of birth: May 25, 1985 (age 41)
- Height: 1.73 m (5 ft 8 in)
- Position: Midfielder

Team information
- Current team: Iraklis Psachna

Senior career*
Years	Team	Apps	(Gls)
2007–2009	Thrasyvoulos	19	(2)
- União São João Esporte Clube
- Botafogo Futebol Clube (PB)
- Juventus Managua
- Osvaldo Cruz Futebol Clube
2010–2011	Ionikos	23	(5)
2011–	Iraklis Psachna	0	(0)
- * Club domestic league appearances and goals as of 19:52, 2 December 2008 (UTC)

Luis Miguel Aparecido Alves (born May 25, 1985), known as Gugu, is a Brazilian football player currently playing for Iraklis Psachna
