= Agustín Pelletieri =

Argentine footballer

Personal information
- Full name: Agustín Daniel Pelletieri
- Date of birth: May 17, 1982 (age 44)
- Place of birth: Buenos Aires, Argentina
- Height: 1.75 m (5 ft 9 in)
- Position: Defensive midfielder

Senior career*
Years	Team	Apps	(Gls)
2002–2011	Lanús	205	(15)
2008–2009	→ AEK Athens (loan)	27	(0)
2011–2014	Racing	77	(1)
2014–2015	Chivas USA	27	(1)
2015	Tigre	11	(0)
2016–2017	Lanús	9	(0)
- * Club domestic league appearances and goals as of 10 May 2015

Agustín Daniel Pelletieri (born May 17, 1982) is an Argentine former footballer who played as a defensive midfielder.

== Career ==
=== Club ===
Pelletieri began his professional career with Lanús in 2002, making his debut in the Primera Division Argentina in 2003. He became an important member of the squad under Ramón Cabrero. In 2007, he was a key part of the squad that won the Apertura 2007 tournament, Lanús' first ever top flight league title. Pelletieri joined AEK Athens on a one-year loan with a purchase option of €2.5 Million but returned to Lanús after the 2008–09 season. In July 2011, Pelletieri signed for Racing Club on a three-year deal. Pelletieri scored his first and only goal with Racing against Argentinos Juniors, helping La Academia to a 2–0 victory.

He signed with Chivas USA of Major League Soccer on February 19, 2014. He scored his first goal for Chivas USA against the Vancouver Whitecaps FC to help his team to 3–1 victory.

He retired as a played in August 2017.

=== International ===
Pelletieri was called up four times for the Argentina national football team but did not leave the bench. Pelletieri got called to play against Venezuela, Peru, Colombia and Chile which was his most recent call up in 2008 by Alfio Basile.

== Honours ==
Lanús

- Primera División Argentina: Apertura 2007
