= 2011–12 AEK Athens F.C. season =

AEK Athens
2011–12 season
- Chairman: Stavros Adamidis (until 3 February); Andreas Dimitrelos
- Manager: Manolo Jiménez (until 5 October); Nikos Kostenoglou
- Stadium: Athens Olympic Stadium
- Super League: 3rd (After play-offs); 5th (Regular season)
- Greek Cup: Round of 16
- UEFA Europa League: Group Stage
- Top goalscorer: League: Leonardo (9); All: Leonardo (13)
- Highest home attendance: 18,611 (vs Olympiacos) (15 October 2011)
- Lowest home attendance: 3,543 (vs Anderlecht) (1 December 2011)
- Average home league attendance: 7,318
- Biggest win: AEK Athens 3–0 Aris
- Biggest defeat: Anderlecht 4–1 AEK Athens; PAOK 3–0 AEK Athens
Home colours	Away colours	Third colours

The 2011–12 season was the 88th season in the existence of AEK Athens F.C. and the 53rd consecutive season in the top flight of Greek football. They competed in the Super League, the Greek Cup and the UEFA Europa League. The season began on 18 August 2011 and finished on 20 May 2012.

== Kits ==
Supplier: Puma
Sponsor(s): Kino
Features: Diners Club, International Service Oil

Home	Away	Third

== Overview ==
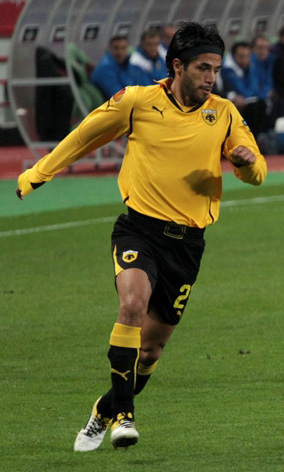
Fabián Vargas

AEK had entered the darkest period of their history and this season the first signs of dissolution began to be clearly visible. The shareholders of the club had withdrawn from the financing and the team was drowning in debt, since it could not meet its financial obligations. The team started the season without particular expectations and in the transfer market the departures of Ignacio Scocco, Ismael Blanco and Papa Bouba Diop stood out, while the international Colombian midfielder, Fabián Vargas and the Icelandic international star, Eiður Guðjohnsen were among the arrivals.

In the Europa League, AEK were drawn with the Georgian Dinamo Tbilisi, with qualification being the only way, since the team's finances were in a very bad state. In the first match at the Olympic Stadium, the yellow-blacks missed several chances, until José Carlos redeemed the team in the last minutes of the match, making the final 1–0. In the replay at the Boris Paichadze National Stadium, AEK entered the match badly and conceded a goal in the first minute, but then recovered and the match eventually went to the extra time. In the first twenty minutes of extra time nothing happened, but in the 110th minute, Guðjohnsen was tackled inside the area and the referee indicated a penalty, where Leonardo converted into a goal, shaping the final 1–1, which gave AEK the qualification. In the group stage, AEK were drawn along with Anderlecht, Lokomotiv Moscow and Sturm Graz and after a teribble run with 5 consecutive defeats, all they managed was to finish third on the tie, with their only victory in an indifferent game in the last matchday.

In the championship, AEK started with some victories, but the heavy defeat at Toumba Stadium made difficult the position of the then expensive for the financial situation of the team, Manolo Jiménez. After the team's victory at Nea Smyrni in the following matchday, and after pressure, Jiménez eventually left, giving away his compensation. In his place, Nikos Kostenoglou returned to take over the team. The team continued their mediocre appearances with the team's game largely dependent on Leonardo's performance. In the Cup, AEK eliminated Kalamata in the Round of 32, but were eliminated by PAOK in the very next round. The end of the regular season found the team in the fifth place, with several hopes of finishing higher in the play-offs. In the play-offs that followed, AEK surprisingly stood decently, losing all away games and winning all home games. Finally, they finished 2nd in the relevant standings, getting a ticket for the Europa league play-off round, but losing the ticket for the Champions League in the last matchday. However the entrance in the UEFA competitions was the least of their problems, as the club was struggling financially and the situation was getting worse year by year.

== Management team ==
Position	Staff
Manager	(Greece) Nikos Kostenoglou
Assistant manager	(Greece) Georgios Alexopoulos
Assistant manager	(Greece) Spyros Toutziarakis
Goalkeeping coach	(Greece) Kostas Kampolis
Fitness coach	(Greece) Spyros Toutziarakis
Fitness coach	(Greece) Dimitris Bouroutzikas
Director of Football	(Iceland) Arnar Grétarsson
Academy director	(North Macedonia) Toni Savevski
U20 Manager	(Greece) Daniel Batista
U17 Manager	(Greece) Charis Kopitsis
Head of Scouting	(Greece) Vasilios Borbokis
Head of Medical	(Greece) Lakis Nikolaou

== Players ==
=== Squad information ===
NOTE: The players are the ones that have been announced by the AEK Athens' press release. No edits should be made unless a player arrival or exit is announced. Updated 20 May 2012, 23:59 UTC+3.

No.	Player	Nat.	Position(s)	Date of birth (Age)	Signed	Previous club	Transfer fee	Contract until
Goalkeepers
23	Dimitrios Konstantopoulos	(Greece)	GK	29 November 1978 (aged 33)	2011	(Greece) Kerkyra	€75,000	2013
28	Theodoros Moschonas	(Greece)	GK	3 December 1990 (aged 21)	2009	(Greece) AEK Athens U20	—	2013
99	Giannis Arabatzis	(Greece)	GK	28 May 1984 (aged 28)	2002	(Greece) Enosi Apostolou Pavlou	€22,000	2013
Defenders
2	Giannis Kontoes	(Greece)	CB / RB / LB / DM	24 May 1986 (aged 26)	2011	(Greece) Panionios	Free	2014
3	Elfar Freyr Helgason	(Iceland)	CB	27 July 1989 (aged 22)	2011	(Iceland) Breiðablik	€100,000	2014
4	Kostas Manolas	(Greece)	CB / RB	14 January 1991 (aged 21)	2009	(Greece) Thrasyvoulos	€50,000	2012
5	Traianos Dellas (Vice-captain 2)	(Greece)	CB	31 January 1976 (aged 36)	2010	(Cyprus) Anorthosis Famagusta	Free	2012
15	Nikolaos Karabelas	(Greece)	LB / LM	20 December 1984 (aged 27)	2009	(Greece) Aris	Free	2013
16	Anestis Argyriou	(Greece)	RB / CB / DM / RM	20 December 1984 (aged 27)	2010	(Greece) Panthrakikos	€250,000	2014
31	Nikolaos Georgeas (Vice-captain 3)	(Greece)	RB / LB / DM	27 December 1976 (aged 35)	2001	(Greece) Kalamata	€1,500,000	2012
47	Mavroudis Bougaidis	(Greece)	CB / LB	1 June 1993 (aged 19)	2011	(Greece) Aris	Free	2014
66	Nikos Englezou	(Cyprus)	LB / LM / LW / DM	11 July 1993 (aged 18)	2011	(Greece) AEK Athens U20	—	2014
Midfielders
1	Pantelis Kafes (Captain)	(Greece)	CM / DM / AM / RM / LM	24 June 1978 (aged 34)	2007	(Greece) Olympiacos	Free	2012
7	Roger Guerreiro	(Poland) (Brazil)	AM / CM / LM / LW / SS	25 May 1982 (aged 30)	2009	(Poland) Legia Warsaw	€250,000	2013
10	José Carlos	(Spain)	AM / RM / LM / RW / LW / SS	17 July 1987 (aged 24)	2011	(Spain) Sevilla	Free	2012
13	Antonis Rikka	(Greece) (France)	DM / CM	3 March 1986 (aged 26)	2008	(Greece) Skoda Xanthi	€600,000	2013
14	Grigoris Makos	(Greece)	DM / CM / CB	18 January 1987 (aged 25)	2009	(Greece) Panionios	€860,000	2014
17	Paul Katsetis	(Greece) (Australia)	AM / CM	19 January 1996 (aged 16)	2011	(Australia) Blacktown City	Free	2014
19	Panagiotis Lagos	(Greece)	LM / LW / LB / CM / DM	18 July 1985 (aged 26)	2006	(Greece) Iraklis	€900,000	2013
21	Fabián Vargas	(Colombia)	DM / CM	17 April 1980 (aged 32)	2011	(Spain) Almería	Free	2012
88	Taxiarchis Fountas	(Greece)	AM / SS / ST / RM / LM / CM / RW / LW	4 September 1995 (aged 16)	2011	(Greece) AEK Athens U20	Free	2014
Forwards
8	Steve Leo Beleck	(Cameroon) (France)	SS / ST / RW / LW / RM / LM	10 February 1993 (aged 19)	2011	(Italy) Udinese	€100,000	2012
9	Leonardo	(Brazil)	LW / AM / LM / RW / RM / SS	22 September 1986 (aged 25)	2009	(Greece) Levadiakos	€700,000	2014
11	Dimitris Sialmas	(Greece)	RW / LW / SS / RM / LM / ST	19 June 1986 (aged 26)	2011	(Greece) PAS Giannina	Free	2013
12	Thomas Tsitas	(Greece)	ST	30 July 1991 (aged 20)	2011	(Greece) Iraklis	Free	2014
22	Eiður Guðjohnsen	(Iceland)	SS / ST / AM / RW / LW / CM	15 September 1978 (aged 33)	2011	(England) Stoke City	Free	2013
33	Nikos Liberopoulos (Vice-captain)	(Greece)	SS / ST / AM	4 August 1975 (aged 36)	2010	(Germany) Eintracht Frankfurt	Free	2012
77	Victor Klonaridis	(Belgium) (Greece)	SS / LW / RW / LM / RM / ST / AM / CM	28 July 1992 (aged 19)	2010	(Greece) AEK Athens U20	—	2012
93	Dimitris Froxylias	(Cyprus) (Greece)	LW / AM / LM / RM / CM	28 June 1993 (aged 19)	2010	(Greece) AEK Athens U20	—	2013
Left during Winter Transfer Window
6	Cala	(Spain)	CB / RB / DM	26 November 1989 (aged 22)	2011	(Spain) Sevilla	Free	2012
92	Sokratis Tsoukalas	(Greece)	RB / LB	7 July 1992 (aged 19)	2011	(Italy) Palermo	Free	2014
90	Savvas Gentsoglou	(Greece)	DM / CB / CM	19 September 1990 (aged 21)	2006	(Greece) AEK Athens U20	—	2014
24	Nathan Burns	(Australia)	RW / SS / ST / LW / AM	7 May 1988 (aged 24)	2008	(Australia) Adelaide United	€450,000	2012

== Transfers ==
=== In ===
==== Summer ====
No.	Pos.	Player	From	Fee	Date	Contract Until	Source
2	DF	(Greece) Giannis Kontoes	(Greece) Panionios	Free transfer	1 August 2011	30 June 2014	
3	DF	(Iceland) Elfar Freyr Helgason	(Iceland) Breiðablik	€100,000	13 July 2011	30 June 2014	
10	MF	(Spain) José Carlos	(Spain) Sevilla	Free transfer	5 July 2011	30 June 2012	
11	FW	(Greece) Dimitrios Sialmas	(Greece) PAS Giannina	Free transfer	1 July 2011	30 June 2013	
12	FW	(Greece) Thomas Tsitas	(Greece) Iraklis	Free transfer	9 August 2011	30 June 2014	
17	MF	(Australia) Paul Katsetis	(Australia) Blacktown City	Free transfer	13 July 2011	30 June 2014	
21	MF	(Colombia) Fabián Vargas	(Spain) Almería	Free transfer	26 August 2011	30 June 2012	
22	FW	(Iceland) Eiður Guðjohnsen	(England) Stoke City	Free transfer	19 July 2011	30 June 2013	
23	GK	(Greece) Dimitrios Konstantopoulos	(Greece) Kerkyra	€75,000	13 July 2011	30 June 2013	
47	DF	(Greece) Mavroudis Bougaidis	(Greece) Aris	Free transfer	1 July 2011	30 June 2014	
66	DF	(Cyprus) Nikos Englezou	(Greece) AEK Athens U20	Promotion	12 July 2011	30 June 2014	
88	MF	(Greece) Taxiarchis Fountas	(Greece) AEK Athens U20	Promotion	1 August 2011	30 June 2014	
92	DF	(Greece) Sokratis Tsoukalas	(Italy) Palermo	Free transfer	5 July 2011	30 June 2014	
—	DF	(Greece) Spyros Matentzidis	(Greece) Anagennisi Karditsa	Loan return	1 July 2011	30 June 2014	
—	DF	(Greece) Stamatis Kalamiotis	(Greece) Niki Volos	Loan return	1 July 2011	30 June 2012	
—	DF	(Greece) Valentinos Vlachos	(Greece) Kavala	Free transfer	1 July 2011	30 June 2015	
—	DF	(Argentina) Carlos Araujo	(Argentina) Lanús	Loan return	1 July 2011	30 June 2012	
—	MF	(Greece) Antonis Rikka	(Greece) Kerkyra	Loan return	1 July 2011	30 June 2013	
—	MF	(Greece) Georgios Paligeorgos	(Greece) Thrasyvoulos	Loan return	1 July 2011	30 June 2011	
—	MF	(Greece) Xenofon Fetsis	(Greece) Panathinaikos	Free transfer	30 August 2011	30 June 2013	
—	FW	(Greece) Panagiotis Zorbas	(Greece) OFI	Loan return	1 July 2011	30 June 2011	

==== Winter ====
No.	Pos.	Player	From	Fee	Date	Contract Until	Source
93	FW	(Cyprus) Dimitris Froxylias	(Greece) Fokikos	Loan termination	31 December 2011	30 June 2013	
—	FW	(Albania) Serxhio Abdurahmani	(Greece) Niki Volos	Loan termination	13 December 2011	30 June 2013	

=== Out ===
==== Summer ====
No.	Pos.	Player	To	Fee	Date	Source
3	DF	(Argentina) Cristian Nasuti	(Argentina) River Plate	Loan return	30 June 2011	
6	DF	(Spain) David Mateos	(Spain) Real Madrid	Loan return	30 June 2011	
8	DF	(Bosnia and Herzegovina) Sanel Jahić	(Cyprus) APOEL	Contract termination	22 June 2011	
11	MF	(Spain) Míchel	(England) Birmingham City	Loan return	30 June 2011	
13	DF	(Uruguay) Claudio Dadómo	(Greece) Ergotelis	Free transfer	25 July 2011	
18	FW	(Argentina) Ismael Blanco	(Mexico) San Luis	End of contract	1 August 2011	
20	FW	(Brazil) Éder	(Brazil) Flamengo	Loan return	30 June 2011	
21	MF	(Senegal) Papa Bouba Diop	(England) West Ham	Contract termination	30 August 2011	
23	GK	(Argentina) Sebastián Saja	(Argentina) Racing Club	Contract termination	3 July 2011	
25	MF	(Greece) Lefteris Intzoglou	(Greece) Atromitos	End of contract	1 July 2011	
26	DF	(Croatia) Dino Drpić	Free agent	End of contract	30 June 2011	
27	GK	(Serbia) Milan Lukač	(Serbia) Beograd	End of contract	1 July 2011	
32	FW	(Argentina) Ignacio Scocco	(United Arab Emirates) Al Ain	€2,800,000	6 June 2011	
39	FW	(Morocco) Nabil Baha	(Spain) Sabadell	End of contract	18 August 2011	
92	DF	(Greece) Michalis Tsamourlidis	(Greece) Glyfada	Contract termination	11 August 2011	
—	DF	(Greece) Dimitris Koutromanos	(Greece) Panetolikos	End of contract	1 July 2011	
—	DF	(Argentina) Carlos Araujo	(Argentina) Lanús	Free transfer	1 July 2011	
—	MF	(Greece) Georgios Paligeorgos	(Greece) Ethnikos Asteras	End of contract	1 July 2011	
—	FW	(Greece) Panagiotis Zorbas	(Greece) OFI	End of contract	1 July 2011	

==== Winter ====
No.	Pos.	Player	To	Fee	Date	Source
6	DF	(Spain) Cala	(Spain) Sevilla	Loan termination^{[a]}	27 January 2012	
24	FW	(Australia) Nathan Burns	(South Korea) Incheon United	Free transfer	25 January 2012	
90	MF	(Greece) Savvas Gentsoglou	(Italy) Sampdoria	Free transfer	19 January 2012	
—	FW	(Albania) Serxhio Abdurahmani	(Greece) Fokikos	Contract termination	26 January 2012	

Notes

a. Sevilla paid €110,000 for the loan termination.

=== Loan in ===
==== Summer ====
No.	Pos.	Player	From	Fee	Date	Until	Option to buy	Source
6	DF	(Spain) Cala	(Spain) Sevilla	Free	5 July 2011	30 June 2012	✗	
8	FW	(Cameroon) Steve Leo Beleck	(Italy) Udinese	€100,000	1 July 2011	30 June 2012	✗	

=== Loan out ===
==== Summer ====
No.	Pos.	Player	To	Fee	Date	Until	Option to buy	Source
29	FW	(Greece) Giorgos Nikoltsis	(Greece) Fokikos	Free	14 October 2011	30 June 2012	✗	
93	FW	(Cyprus) Dimitris Froxylias	(Greece) Fokikos	Free	14 October 2011	30 June 2012	✗	
99	FW	(Albania) Serxhio Abdurahmani	(Greece) Niki Volos	Free	31 August 2011	30 June 2012	✗	
—	DF	(Greece) Spyros Matentzidis	(Greece) Diagoras	Free	30 August 2011	30 June 2012	✗	
—	DF	(Greece) Stamatis Kalamiotis	(Greece) Thrasyvoulos	Free	31 August 2011	30 June 2012	✗	
—	DF	(Greece) Valentinos Vlachos	(Greece) Thrasyvoulos	Free	31 August 2011	30 June 2012	✗	
—	MF	(Greece) Xenofon Fetsis	(Greece) Glyfada	Free	31 August 2011	30 June 2012	✗	
—	MF	(Ghana) Joseph Agyriba	(Greece) Glyfada	Free	31 August 2011	30 June 2012	✗	

==== Winter ====
No.	Pos.	Player	To	Fee	Date	Until	Option to buy	Source
92	DF	(Greece) Sokratis Tsoukalas	(Greece) Apollon Smyrnis	Free	10 January 2012	30 June 2012	✗	

=== Contract renewals ===
No.	Pos.	Player	Date	Former Exp. Date	New Exp. Date	Source
5	DF	(Greece) Traianos Dellas	12 July 2011	30 June 2011	30 June 2012	
28	GK	(Greece) Theodoros Moschonas	15 June 2011	30 June 2011	30 June 2013	
33	FW	(Greece) Nikos Liberopoulos	16 June 2011	30 June 2011	30 June 2012	
—	MF	(Ghana) Joseph Agyriba	31 August 2011	30 June 2012	30 June 2013	

=== Overall transfer activity ===
==== Expenditure ====
Summer: ▼€275,000

Winter: ▼€0

Total: ▼€275,000

==== Income ====
Summer: ▲€2,800,000

Winter: ▲€0

Total: ▲€2,800,000

==== Net Totals ====
Summer: ▲€2,525,000

Winter: €0

Total: ▲€2,525,000

== Pre-season and friendlies ==
21 July 2011 Friendly	Odranci	0–5	AEK Athens	Odranci
17:45 EEST (UTC+3)		Report	José Carlos 32'; Nikoltsis 50'; Guerreiro 63'; Leonardo 68'; Kafes 71' (pen.)	Stadium: ŠRC Odranci; Attendance: 250

24 July 2011 Friendly	Baku	0–0	AEK Athens	Murska Sobota
19:00 EEST (UTC+3)		Report		Stadium: Fazanerija City Stadium

27 July 2011 Friendly	Kardemir Karabükspor	0–0	AEK Athens	Bad Radkersburg
19:00 EEST (UTC+3)		Report		Stadium: Parktherme-Arena; Referee: Stefan Sekonja (Slovenia)

30 July 2011 Friendly	AEK Athens	1–1	Rad	Toplice
19:00 EEST (UTC+3)	Beleck 33'; José Carlos (yellow card) 65'; Klonaridis (yellow card) 89'	Report	Stojiljković 21'	Stadium: Toplice Stadium

3 August 2011 Friendly	Kerkyra	0–2	AEK Athens	Corfu
20:00 EEST (UTC+3)		Report	Manolas 30'; Makos 67'	Stadium: Kerkyra Stadium; Referee: Anastasios Kakos (Corfu)

6 August 2011 Friendly	AEK Athens	0–1	Getafe	Marousi
21:00 EEST (UTC+3)		Report	Miku 4'	Stadium: Olympic Stadium; Attendance: 7,182; Referee: Giorgos Kominis (Thesprotia)

9 August 2011 Anorthosis tournament	Anorthosis Famagusta	3–0	AEK Athens	Larnaca
21:00 EEST (UTC+3)	Angelov 7', 20'; Michael 80'	Report		Stadium: Antonis Papadopoulos Stadium

10 August 2011 Anorthosis tournament	AEL Limassol	2–2	AEK Athens	Larnaca
21:00 EEST (UTC+3)	Henrique 19'; Cala 54' (o.g.)	Report	Sialmas 12'; Cala 46'	Stadium: Antonis Papadopoulos Stadium; Attendance: 550

31 August 2011 Friendly	Panachaiki	2–0	AEK Athens	Patras
20:30 EEST (UTC+3)	Foufoulas (yellow card) 37'; Milošeski 47'; Lampropoulos (yellow card) 73'; Chloros 88'	Report	Leonardo (yellow card) 54'	Stadium: Kostas Davourlis Stadium; Attendance: 7,000; Referee: Giorgos Daskalopoulos (Corinthia)

== Competitions ==
=== Overall record ===
Competition	First match	Last match	Starting round	Final position	Record							
Competition	First match	Last match	Starting round	Final position	Pld	W	D	L	GF	GA	GD	Win %
Super League	18 September 2011	22 April 2012	Matchday 1	5th	30	13	9	8	36	30	+6	43.33
Super League Play-offs	2 May 2012	20 May 2012	Matchday 1	3rd	6	3	0	3	7	5	+2	50.00
Greek Cup	22 December 2011	18 January 2012	Round of 32	Round of 16	2	1	0	1	1	2	−1	50.00
UEFA Europa League	18 August 2011	14 December 2011	Play-off round	Group stage	8	2	1	5	10	16	−6	25.00
Total					46	19	10	17	54	53	+1	41.30

Last updated: 20 May 2012
Source: Competitions

=== Super League Greece ===
==== Regular season ====
===== League table =====
Pos	Team	Pld	W	D	L	GF	GA	GD	Pts	Qualification or relegation
3	PAOK	30	14	8	8	45	27	+18	50 (Note: Head-to-head points: PAOK 4, Atromitos 1.)	Qualification for the Play-offs
4	Atromitos	30	13	11	6	32	26	+6	50	Qualification for the Play-offs
5	AEK Athens	30	13	9	8	36	30	+6	48	Qualification for the Play-offs
6	Asteras Tripolis	30	13	6	11	30	34	−4	45	Qualification for Europa League second qualifying round (Note: AEK Athens were not licensed to play in the Europa League 2012–13 and therefore were replaced by the 6th placed team in the league table, which were Asteras Tripolis (which played in the second qualifying round).)
7	Levadiakos	30	11	6	13	33	42	−9	39	

Source: Super League Greece
Rules for classification: 1) Points, 2) Head-to-head points, 3) Head-to-head goal difference.
If in current league table there are tied teams after applying criteria 1 to 3, they are considered to share places and listed in Greek language alphabetic order.
If in final league table there are still tied teams after applying criteria 1 to 3, a decision match (or matches if they are more than two) are to be played but only in three cases: to determine the champion, to fill spots in the play-off or to determine the teams to be relegated. In any other case, the final standings of tied teams are determined with a public draw

===== Results summary =====
Overall								Home						Away					
Pld	W	D	L	GF	GA	GD	Pts	W	D	L	GF	GA	GD	W	D	L	GF	GA	GD
30	13	9	8	36	30	+6	48	9	5	1	18	7	+11	4	4	7	18	23	−5

Last updated: 2012-04-22.
Source: Super League Greece

===== Results by Matchday =====
Round	1	2	3	4	5	6	7	8	9	10	11	12	13	14	15	16	17	18	19	20	21	22	23	24	25	26	27	28	29	30
Ground	H	A	H	A	A	H	A	H	A	H	A	H	H	A	H	A	H	A	H	H	A	H	A	H	A	H	A	A	H	A
Result	W	W	W	L	W	D	L	W	L	W	W	W	W	L	D	W	D	D	L	W	L	D	L	W	D	W	D	L	D	D
Position	2	2	2	3	2	3	4	4	4	4	3	3	3	3	3	3	3	3	4	3	4	4	5	5	5	5	5	5	5	5

Updated to match(es) played on 22 April 2012. Source: slgr.gr
A = Away; H = Home; W = Win; D = Draw; L = Loss; P = Postponed

===== Matches =====
23 November 2011 1	AEK Athens	2–1	Levadiakos	Marousi
19:00 EET (UTC+2)	Liberopoulos (yellow card) 41'; Leonardo 42' (pen.), 51'; Sialmas (yellow card) 83'; Rikka (yellow card) 84' (yellow-red card) 89'	Report	Viana (yellow card) 41'; Tomas (yellow card) 51'; Lisgaras (yellow card) 90+1'; Vasiliou 90+3'	Stadium: Olympic Stadium; Attendance: 3,798; Referee: Giannis Delfakis (Arcadia)
Note: The match was scheduled for 23 November, because it had not yet been decided the teams that would replace Olympiacos Volos and Kavala, after their deletion for the league for match-fixing scandal.

21 September 2011 2	Skoda Xanthi	3–4	AEK Athens	Xanthi
18:30 EEST (UTC+3)	Marcelinho 13', 84'; Markovski 90+5'	Report	Karabelas (yellow card) 4'; Vargas 23', (yellow card) 50'; Makos (yellow card) 25'; Liberopoulos 38', (yellow card) 72'; Guðjohnsen 75', (yellow card) 90'; Arabatzis (yellow card) 80'; Klonaridis 90+1'	Stadium: Skoda Xanthi Arena; Attendance: 1,991; Referee: Stavros Tritsonis (Athens)

18 September 2011 3	AEK Athens	1–0	Ergotelis	Marousi
18:15 EEST (UTC+3)	Makos 31'; Gentsoglou (yellow card) 77'; Arabatzis (yellow card) 90+1'	Report	Fragoulakis (yellow card) 25'; Chanti (yellow card) 88'	Stadium: Olympic Stadium; Attendance: Behind closed doors Referee: Georgios Kominis (Thesprotia)

25 September 2011 4	PAOK	3–0	AEK Athens	Thessaloniki
20:30 EEST (UTC+3)	Vieirinha 16'; Krešić (yellow card) 21'; Athanasiadis 37', (yellow card) 75'; Salpingidis 45+1'; Arias (yellow card) 60'	Report	Karabelas (yellow card) 17'; Vargas (yellow card) 26'; Dellas (yellow card) 37'; Cala (yellow card) 44'; Makos (yellow card) 88'	Stadium: Toumba Stadium; Attendance: 19,235; Referee: Anastasios Kakos (Corfu)

2 October 2011 5	Panionios	0–1	AEK Athens	Nea Smyrni
18:15 EEST (UTC+3)	Petkakis (yellow card) 90'	Report	Lagos (yellow card) 11'; Liberopoulos (yellow card) 30'; Manolas 90+2'; Makos (yellow card) 90+3'	Stadium: Nea Smyrni Stadium; Attendance: 3,534; Referee: Giorgos Daskalopoulos (Corinthia)

15 October 2011 6	AEK Athens	1–1	Olympiacos	Marousi
20:30 EEST (UTC+3)	Vargas (yellow card) 10'; Manolas (yellow card) 12'; Makos (yellow card) 14' (yellow-red card) 88'; Guðjohnsen (yellow card) 34'; Leonardo 43'; Lagos (yellow card) 71'; Cala (yellow card) 90'	Report	Holebas (yellow card) 12'; Mirallas 23'; Modesto (yellow card) 26' (yellow-red card) 89'	Stadium: Olympic Stadium; Attendance: 18,611; Referee: Petros Konstantineas (Messinia)

23 October 2011 7	OFI	3–1	AEK Athens	Heraklion
18:15 EEST (UTC+3)	Mantzios 12', 81'; Bulut (yellow card) 14'; Georgiou (yellow card) 24'; Carroll (yellow card) 38'; Šišić (yellow card) 45+3'; Chumbinho 49'	Report	Vargas (yellow card) 38'; Beleck 60'; Dellas (yellow card) 81'	Stadium: Theodoros Vardinogiannis Stadium; Attendance: 4,443; Referee: Dimitris Styliaras (Aetoloacarnania)

30 October 2011 8	AEK Athens	3–0	Aris	Marousi
17:15 EET (UTC+2)	Leonardo (yellow card) 6'; Lazaridis 10' (o.g.); Liberopoulos 39', (yellow card) 57'; Cala (yellow card) 43', (goal) 78'; Makos (yellow card) 75'	Report	Kapetanos (yellow card) 53'; Papasterianos (yellow card) 61'	Stadium: Olympic Stadium; Attendance: 6,379; Referee: Anastasios Kakos (Corfu)

6 November 2011 9	Panathinaikos	3–2	AEK Athens	Marousi
19:30 EET (UTC+2)	Leto 16', 30'; Simão (yellow card) 27'; Katsouranis 53'; Boumsong (yellow card) 68'	Report	Karabelas (yellow card) 35'; Cala (yellow card) 49'; Beleck 61'; Kafes (yellow card) 68'; Liberopoulos (yellow card) 82'; Leonardo 89'; Vargas (yellow card) 90+2'; Arabatzis (yellow card) 90+6'	Stadium: Olympic Stadium; Attendance: 32,929; Referee: Ilias Spathas (Piraeus)

19 November 2011 10	AEK Athens	2–0	Asteras Tripolis	Marousi
17:15 EET (UTC+2)	Manolas (yellow card) 5'; Liberopoulos 13', (yellow card) 57'; Leonardo 65'	Report	Formica (yellow card) 39'; Rayos (yellow card) 41'; Perrone (yellow card) 42'; Bartolini (yellow card) 59'	Stadium: Olympic Stadium; Attendance: 5,019; Referee: Michalis Voskakis (Rethymnο)

26 November 2011 11	Panetolikos	0–2	AEK Athens	Agrinio
19:30 EET (UTC+2)		Report	Dellas (yellow card) 8'; Beleck 21', 90+1'; Karabelas (yellow card) 37'; Kontoes (yellow card) 68'; Georgeas (yellow card) 87'	Stadium: Panetolikos Stadium; Attendance: 5,963; Referee: Alexis Aretopoulos (Trikala)

4 December 2011 12	AEK Athens	1–0	Kerkyra	Marousi
15:00 EET (UTC+2)	Dellas (yellow card) 30'; Beleck 76'; Leonardo (yellow card) 51'	Report	Majstorović (yellow card) 44'; Gustavo (yellow card) 62'; Kontodimos (yellow card) 90+2'	Stadium: Olympic Stadium; Attendance: 7,072; Referee: Apostolos Abarkiolis (Macedonia)

10 December 2011 13	AEK Athens	2–1	PAS Giannina	Marousi
19:30 EET (UTC+2)	José Carlos 15', (yellow card) 74'; Pantos 52' (o.g.); Kontoes (yellow card) 83'; Arabatzis (yellow card) 90+5'	Report	Fegrouche (yellow card) 27'; Lila (yellow card) 45'; Andralas (yellow card) 58'; Kyriakos (yellow card) 71'; Kotsios 73'; Bouzid (yellow card) 87'	Stadium: Olympic Stadium; Attendance: 12,032; Referee: Thanasis Giachos (Chios)

18 December 2011 14	Atromitos	1–0	AEK Athens	Peristeri
17:15 EET (UTC+2)	Itandje (yellow card) 21'; Zuela (yellow card) 27'; Sfakianakis 58'; Tatos (yellow card) 74'	Report	Liberopoulos (yellow card) 21'; Karabelas (yellow card) 66'; Manolas (yellow card) 79'; Kontoes (yellow card) 86'; Guerreiro (yellow card) 90+3'	Stadium: Peristeri Stadium; Attendance: 2,372; Referee: Ilias Spathas (Piraeus)

3 January 2012 15	AEK Athens	0–0	Doxa Drama	Marousi
19:30 EET (UTC+2)	Georgeas (yellow card) 82'; Leonardo (yellow card) 90+6'	Report	Abubakari (yellow card) 7'; Leandro (yellow card) 45+1'; Šeremet (yellow card) 79'; Wanderson (yellow card) 82'; Vertzos (yellow card) 86'	Stadium: Olympic Stadium; Attendance: 5,582; Referee: Spyros Selimos (Laconia)

7 January 2012 16	Levadiakos	0–2	AEK Athens	Livadeia
19:30 EET (UTC+2)	Zahui (yellow card) 42'; Popović (yellow card) 60'; Napoleoni (yellow card) 90+1'	Report	Sialmas 34', 71', (yellow card) 35' (yellow-red card) 82'; Karabelas (yellow card) 49'; Beleck (yellow card) 62'	Stadium: Levadia Municipal Stadium; Attendance: 778; Referee: Andreas Pappas (Athens)

14 January 2012 17	AEK Athens	1–1	Skoda Xanthi	Marousi
17:15 EET (UTC+2)	José Carlos (yellow card) 28'; Leonardo (yellow card) 30', (goal) 45+1' (pen.); Cala (yellow card) 48'; Liberopoulos (yellow card) 71'; Georgeas (yellow card) 90+2'	Report	Dani (yellow card) 28'; Markovski 29'; Mantalos (yellow card) 81'; Vallas (yellow card) 89'	Stadium: Olympic Stadium; Attendance: 5,017; Referee: Praxitelis Zachariadis (Macedonia)

21 January 2012 18	Ergotelis	1–1	AEK Athens	Heraklion
17:15 EET (UTC+2)	Budimir (yellow card) 30'; Koutsianikoulis (yellow card) 45+1'; Kyriakidis (yellow card) 47'; Tzanakakis (yellow card) 56'; Katsikokeris 74'; Fragoulakis (yellow card) 76'; Gialousis (yellow card) 85'	Report	Lagos (yellow card) 31'; Rikka (yellow card) 35'; Liberopoulos 49'; Kontoes (yellow card) 54'; Vargas (yellow card) 88'	Stadium: Pankritio Stadium; Attendance: 853; Referee: Alexis Aretopoulos (Trikala)

29 January 2012 19	AEK Athens	0–2	PAOK	Marousi
19:30 EET (UTC+2)	Manolas (yellow card) 68'; Argyriou (yellow card) 78'; Arabatzis (yellow card) 85'	Report	Georgiadis 16'; Sznaucner (yellow card) 30'; Fotakis (yellow card) 37'; Athanasiadis 66', (yellow card) 67'	Stadium: Olympic Stadium; Attendance: 6,110; Referee: Anastasios Kakos (Corfu)

5 February 2012 20	AEK Athens	1–0	Panionios	Marousi
17:15 EET (UTC+2)	Kafes 27', (yellow card) 30'; Leonardo (yellow card) 32'	Report	Rokas (yellow card) 24'; Omo (yellow card) 41'	Stadium: Olympic Stadium; Attendance: 4,344; Referee: Dimitris Thanos (Grevena)

10 February 2012 21	Olympiacos	2–0	AEK Athens	Piraeus
21:00 EET (UTC+2)	Mellberg 5'; Mirallas 24'; Papadopoulos (yellow card) 69'; Ibagaza (yellow card) 80'; Modesto (yellow card) 89'	Report	Makos (yellow card) 23'; Beleck (yellow card) 42'; Dellas (yellow card) 45+1'; Manolas (yellow card) 80'	Stadium: Karaiskakis Stadium; Attendance: 28,057; Referee: Andreas Pappas (Athens)

26 February 2012 22	AEK Athens	1–1	OFI	Marousi
19:30 EET (UTC+2)	Manolas (yellow card) 11' (yellow-red card) 58'; Vargas (yellow card) 42'; Liberopoulos (yellow card) 43', (goal) 55'	Report	López (yellow card) 43', (goal) 66'	Stadium: Olympic Stadium; Attendance: Behind closed doors Referee: Thanasis Giachos (Chios)
Note: The match was originally to be held on 18 February, but because a few number tickets were authenticated by the tax office and in fear of incidents with the fans, its conduction was moved for 26 February.

3 March 2012 23	Aris	1–0	AEK Athens	Thessaloniki
19:30 EET (UTC+2)	Papazacharias (yellow card) 38'; Lazaridis 79'	Report	Karabelas (yellow card) 15'; Lagos (yellow card) 73'; Georgeas (yellow card) 74'; Dellas (yellow card) 74'; Makos (yellow card) 80'	Stadium: Kleanthis Vikelidis Stadium; Attendance: 8,641; Referee: Anastasios Kakos (Corfu)

11 March 2012 24	AEK Athens	2–0	Panathinaikos	Marousi
19:30 EET (UTC+2)	Karabelas (yellow card) 23'; Georgeas (yellow card) 43'; Leonardo 48', (yellow card) 48'; Klonaridis 71', (yellow card) 72'; Manolas (yellow card) 90+1'	Report	Katsouranis (yellow card) 10'; Marinos (yellow card) 36'; Simão (yellow card) 84'	Stadium: Olympic Stadium; Attendance: 14,270; Referee: Michael Koukoulakis (Heraklion)

17 March 2012 25	Asteras Tripolis	1–1	AEK Athens	Tripoli
19:30 EET (UTC+2)	Solakis (yellow card) 38'; Navarro 54'; Kourbelis (yellow card) 67'; Bartolini (yellow card) 71'	Report	Liberopoulos (yellow card) 71'; Manolas (yellow card) 78'; Leonardo 86'; Kafes (yellow card) 89'	Stadium: Asteras Tripolis Stadium; Attendance: 2,094; Referee: Dimitris Thanos (Grevena)

25 March 2012 26	AEK Athens	1−0	Panetolikos	Marousi
17:15 EEST (UTC+3)	Liberopoulos 10', (yellow card) 85'; Lagos (yellow card) 52'; Kafes (yellow card) 59'; Makos (yellow card) 67'	Report	Mitropoulos (yellow card) 67'	Stadium: Olympic Stadium; Attendance: 5,376; Referee: Giorgos Daskalopoulos (Corinthia)

1 April 2012 27	Kerkyra	2–2	AEK Athens	Corfu
19:00 EEST (UTC+3)	Osman 14'; Kontodimos (yellow card) 73'; Iliadis (yellow card) 88'; Tsigas 90+5', (yellow card) 90+5'	Report	Klonaridis 16'; Makos (yellow card) 32'; Liberopoulos 37'; Rikka (yellow card) 66'	Stadium: Kerkyra Stadium; Attendance: 1,324; Referee: Giannis Delfakis (Arcadia)

8 April 2012 28	PAS Giannina	2–1	AEK Athens	Ioannina
19:00 EEST (UTC+3)	Leandro (yellow card) 54', (goal) 58'; Pantos (yellow card) 61'; Tzanis (yellow card) 77'; Kyriakos 84'	Report	Bougaidis (yellow card) 31'; Vargas (yellow card) 56'; Karabelas (yellow card) 66'; Vanderson 81' (o.g.); Georgeas (yellow card) 90+2'; Klonaridis (yellow card) 90+4'	Stadium: Zosimades Stadium; Attendance: 3,730; Referee: Spyros Selimos (Laconia)

18 April 2012 29	AEK Athens	0–0	Atromitos	Marousi
19:00 EEST (UTC+3)	Ballas (yellow card) 45'; Iglesias (yellow card) 59'; Brito (yellow card) 69'; Skondras (yellow card) 81'; Itandje (yellow card) 90+3'	Report		Stadium: Olympic Stadium; Attendance: 4,035; Referee: Michael Koukoulakis (Heraklion)

22 April 2012 30	Doxa Drama	1–1	AEK Athens	Thessaloniki
19:00 EEST (UTC+3)	Kyvelidis 57'; Abubakari (yellow card) 63'	Report	Leonardo 70'	Stadium: Kaftanzoglio Stadium; Attendance: 724; Referee: Christos Mitsios (Epirus)

==== Play-offs ====
===== Table =====
Pos	Team	Pld	W	D	L	GF	GA	GD	Pts	Qualification
2	Panathinaikos	6	3	1	2	5	4	+1	14	Qualification for the Champions League third qualifying round
3	AEK Athens	6	3	0	3	7	5	+2	9	Ineligible for the 2012–13 European competitions. (Note: AEK Athens were not licensed to play in the Europa League 2012–2013 and therefore were replaced by the 6th placed team in the league table, Asteras Tripolis, qualified for the second qualifying round. This meant that PAOK were qualified for the third qualifying round of the Europa League and Atromitos to the Europa League play-offs.)
4	Atromitos	6	2	2	2	6	6	0	8	Qualification for the Europa League play-off round (Note: Atromitos lost the final of the 2011–12 Greek Football Cup against Champions League-qualified team Olympiacos. As a consequence, the three Europa League spots were distributed by the final standings of this group.)
5	PAOK	6	2	1	3	3	6	−3	7	Qualification for the Europa League third qualifying round

Source: Super League Greece: Standings and Schedule
Rules for classification: Rules for classification: 1) points; 2) head-to-head points; 3) head-to-head goal difference; 4) classification of regular season.

===== Results summary =====
Overall								Home						Away					
Pld	W	D	L	GF	GA	GD	Pts	W	D	L	GF	GA	GD	W	D	L	GF	GA	GD
6	3	0	3	7	5	+2	9	3	0	0	7	2	+5	0	0	3	0	3	−3

Last updated: 2012-05-20.
Source: Super League Greece

===== Results by Matchday =====
Round	1	2	3	4	5	6
Ground	A	H	H	A	H	A
Result	L	W	W	L	W	L
Position	5	3	2	3	3	3

Updated to match(es) played on 20 May 2012. Source: slgr.gr
A = Away; H = Home; W = Win; D = Draw; L = Loss; P = Postponed

===== Matches =====
2 May 2012 1	PAOK	1–0	AEK Athens	Thessaloniki
20:00 EEST (UTC+3)	Nimani (yellow card) 85'; Georgiadis 87', (yellow card) 88'; Ivić (yellow card) 90+2'	Report	Makos (yellow card) 63'; Liberopoulos (yellow card) 80'; Kafes (yellow card) 84'	Stadium: Toumba Stadium; Attendance: 9,771; Referee: Anastasios Kakos (Corfu)

7 May 2012 2	AEK Athens	2–0	Panathinaikos	Marousi
20:00 EEST (UTC+3)	Bougaidis (yellow card) 25'; Makos 29'; Kafes (yellow card) 62'; Klonaridis 80'; Manolas (yellow card) 90+4'	Report	Toché (yellow card) 12'; Simão (yellow card) 45+3'	Stadium: Olympic Stadium; Attendance: 6,018; Referee: Anastasios Sidiropoulos (Dodecanese)

10 May 2012 3	AEK Athens	3–2	Atromitos	Marousi
17:45 EEST (UTC+3)	Bougaidis (yellow card) 26'; José Carlos 50'; Karabelas (yellow card) 51'; Liberopoulos 54', 62'	Report	Epstein 20'; Fytanidis (yellow card) 38'; Thomas (yellow card) 42', (goal) 68'; Skondras (yellow card) 57'; Pitu (yellow card) 85'	Stadium: Olympic Stadium; Attendance: 5,720; Referee: Anastasios Kakos (Corfu)

13 May 2012 4	Atromitos	1–0	AEK Athens	Peristeri
17:00 EEST (UTC+3)	Thomas (yellow card) 44'; Iglesias (yellow card) 67'; Skondras 75'	Report		Stadium: Peristeri Stadium; Attendance: 1,628; Referee: Dimitris Thanos (Grevena)

16 May 2012 5	AEK Athens	2–0	PAOK	Marousi
20:00 EEST (UTC+3)	Liberopoulos 33'; Vargas (yellow card) 49'; Leonardo 85'; Kontoes (yellow card) 66'	Report	Apostolopoulos (yellow card) 12'; García (yellow card) 21' (yellow-red card) 65'; Fotakis (yellow card) 59' (yellow-red card) 78'	Stadium: Olympic Stadium; Attendance: 8,293; Referee: Michael Koukoulakis (Heraklion)

20 May 2012 6	Panathinaikos	1–0	AEK Athens	Marousi
20:00 EEST (UTC+3)	Toché 62'; Quincy (yellow card) 65'; Mavrias (yellow card) 72'; Kanté (yellow card) 82'	Report	Lagos (yellow card) 48'; Fountas (yellow card) 64'	Stadium: Olympic Stadium; Attendance: 11,260; Referee: Anastasios Kakos (Corfu)

=== Greek Cup ===
==== Matches ====
22 December 2011 Round of 32	Kalamata	0–1	AEK Athens	Kalamata
15:00 EET (UTC+2)	Athanasopoulos (yellow card) 72'	Report	Argyriou (yellow card) 14'; Beleck 47'; Manolas (yellow card) 59'	Stadium: Kalamata Municipal Stadium; Attendance: 4,000; Referee: Georgios Daskalopoulos (Corinthia)

18 January 2012 Round of 16	PAOK	2–0	AEK Athens	Thessaloniki
20:00 EET (UTC+2)	Athanasiadis (yellow card) 23', (goal) 54'; Lino 33' (pen.); Salpingidis (yellow card) 83'	Report	Cala (yellow card) 63'; José Carlos (yellow card) 82'	Stadium: Toumba Stadium; Attendance: 15,095; Referee: Thanasis Giachos (Chios)

=== UEFA Europa League ===
==== Play-off round ====
The draw for the play-off round was held on 5 August 2011.

18 August 2011 First leg	AEK Athens (Greece)	1–0	(Georgia (country)) Dinamo Tbilisi	Athens, Greece
21:45 EEST (UTC+3)	Makos (yellow card) 46'; Georgeas (yellow card) 66'; Manolas (yellow card) 67'; Karabelas (yellow card) 86'; José Carlos 87', (yellow card) 87'; Kafes (yellow card) 90+1'	Report	Yagüe (yellow card) 8'; Xisco (yellow card) 65'; Koshkadze (yellow card) 79'	Stadium: Olympic Stadium; Attendance: 12,640; Referee: Simon Lee Evans (Wales)

25 August 2011 Second leg	Dinamo Tbilisi (Georgia (country))	1–1 (a.e.t.) (1–2 agg.)	(Greece) AEK Athens	Tbilisi, Georgia
20:05 EEST (UTC+3)	Koshkadze 1'; Xisco (yellow card) 51'; Álvaro (yellow card) 67'; Kakubava (yellow card) 75' (yellow-red card) 110'; Kakhelishvili (red card) 120'	Report	José Carlos (yellow card) 32'; Makos (yellow card) 67' (yellow-red card) 120'; Cala (yellow card) 67'; Karabelas (yellow card) 77'; Leonardo 111' (pen.); Guðjohnsen (yellow card) 115'	Stadium: Boris Paichadze National Stadium; Attendance: 40,486; Referee: Darko Čeferin (Slovenia)

==== Group stage ====
The draw for the group stage was held on 26 August 2011.

Pos	Team	Pld	W	D	L	GF	GA	GD	Pts	Qualification	AND	LM	AEK	SG
1	(Belgium) Anderlecht	6	6	0	0	18	5	+13	18	Advance to knockout phase	—	5–3	4–1	3–0
2	(Russia) Lokomotiv Moscow	6	4	0	2	14	11	+3	12	Advance to knockout phase	0–2	—	3–1	3–1
3	(Greece) AEK Athens	6	1	0	5	8	15	−7	3 (Note: Tied on head-to-head points (3). Head-to-head goal difference: AEK Athens +1, Sturm Graz −1.)		1–2	1–3	—	1–2
4	(Austria) Sturm Graz	6	1	0	5	5	14	−9	3		0–2	1–2	1–3	—

Source: Soccerway

===== Matches =====
15 September 2011 1	Anderlecht (Belgium)	4–1	(Greece) AEK Athens	Brussels, Belgium
22:05 EEST (UTC+3)	Suárez 16', 40', 84'; Juhász (yellow card) 21'; Jovanović 33', (yellow card) 77'	Report	Leonardo 36'; Vargas (yellow card) 41'; Manolas (yellow card) 58' (yellow-red card)	Stadium: Constant Vanden Stock Stadium; Attendance: 11,480; Referee: Carlos Clos Gómez (Spain)

29 September 2011 2	AEK Athens (Greece)	1–2	(Austria) Sturm Graz	Athens, Greece
20:00 EEST (UTC+3)	Lagos (yellow card) 48'; Dellas (yellow card) 49' (yellow-red card); Standfest 50' (o.g.); Cala (yellow card) 89'	Report	Bukva (yellow card) 55'; Burgstaller 87'; Haas (yellow card) 74', (goal) 90+2'	Stadium: Olympic Stadium; Attendance: 10,074; Referee: Lee Probert (England)

20 October 2011 3	Lokomotiv Moscow (Russia)	3–1	(Greece) AEK Athens	Moscow, Russia
19:00 EEST (UTC+3)	Sychev 47', 71' (pen.); Ibričić (yellow card) 62'; Da Costa (yellow card) 75'; Caicedo 90+3'	Report	José Carlos (yellow card) 67'; Sialmas 89'	Stadium: Lokomotiv Stadium; Attendance: 8,279; Referee: Pol van Boekel (Netherlands)

3 November 2011 4	AEK Athens (Greece)	1–3	(Russia) Lokomotiv Moscow	Athens, Greece
22:05 EET (UTC+2)	Makos (yellow card) 36'; Leonardo 60' (pen.)	Report	Glushakov 50'; Shishkin (yellow card) 59'; Maicon 72'; Ignatyev 80'	Stadium: Olympic Stadium; Attendance: 4,042; Referee: William Collum (Scotland)

1 December 2011 5	AEK Athens (Greece)	1–2	(Belgium) Anderlecht	Athens, Greece
20:00 EET (UTC+2)	Sialmas 19'; Kontoes (yellow card) 59'; Leonardo (yellow card) 90'	Report	Gillet 4', 36', (yellow card) 90+2'	Stadium: Olympic Stadium; Attendance: 3,543; Referee: Robert Małek (Poland)

14 December 2011 6	Sturm Graz (Austria)	1–3	(Greece) AEK Athens	Graz, Austria
22:05 EET (UTC+2)	Kainz (yellow card) 22', (goal) 59'; Dudić (yellow card) 68'; Haas (yellow card) 90+1'	Report	Manolas 10'; Burns 43'; Cala (yellow card) 68'; Klonaridis 77'	Stadium: UPC-Arena; Attendance: 13,681; Referee: Alexandru Deaconu (Romania)

== Statistics ==
=== Squad statistics ===
As of 20 May 2012

No.	Pos	Player	Super League		Super League Play-offs		Greek Cup		Europa League		Total	
No.	Pos	Player	Apps	Goals	Apps	Goals	Apps	Goals	Apps	Goals	Apps	Goals
Goalkeepers
23	GK	(Greece) Dimitrios Konstantopoulos	9	0	6	0	0	0	5	0	20	0
28	GK	(Greece) Theodoros Moschonas	0	0	0	0	0	0	0	0	0	0
99	GK	(Greece) Giannis Arabatzis	21	0	0	0	2	0	4	0	27	0
Defenders
2	DF	(Greece) Giannis Kontoes	23	0	5	0	1	0	5	0	34	0
3	DF	(Iceland) Elfar Freyr Helgason	0	0	0	0	0	0	2	0	2	0
4	DF	(Greece) Kostas Manolas	24	1	5	0	2	0	7	1	38	2
5	DF	(Greece) Traianos Dellas	14	0	1	0	0	0	3	0	18	0
15	DF	(Greece) Nikolaos Karabelas	23	0	4	0	2	0	5	0	34	0
16	DF	(Greece) Anestis Argyriou	8	0	0	0	1	0	0	0	9	0
31	DF	(Greece) Nikolaos Georgeas	21	0	6	0	2	0	4	0	33	0
47	DF	(Greece) Mavroudis Bougaidis	5	0	4	0	1	0	2	0	12	0
66	DF	(Cyprus) Nikos Englezou	1	0	1	0	0	0	2	0	4	0
Midfielders
1	MF	(Greece) Pantelis Kafes	20	1	6	0	1	0	3	0	30	1
7	MF	(Poland) Roger Guerreiro	16	0	0	0	2	0	4	0	22	0
10	MF	(Spain) José Carlos	23	1	4	1	2	0	6	2	35	4
13	MF	(Greece) Antonis Rikka	11	0	1	0	1	0	0	0	13	0
14	MF	(Greece) Grigoris Makos	22	1	6	1	1	0	5	0	34	2
17	MF	(Australia) Paul Katsetis	0	0	0	0	0	0	0	0	0	0
19	MF	(Greece) Panagiotis Lagos	16	0	3	0	0	0	6	0	25	0
21	MF	(Colombia) Fabián Vargas	20	1	3	0	0	0	4	0	27	1
88	MF	(Greece) Taxiarchis Fountas	4	0	4	0	0	0	0	0	8	0
Forwards
8	FW	(Cameroon) Steve Leo Beleck	25	5	2	0	2	1	7	0	36	6
9	FW	(Brazil) Leonardo	26	9	6	1	1	0	7	3	40	13
11	FW	(Greece) Dimitris Sialmas	20	2	2	0	2	0	5	2	29	4
12	FW	(Greece) Thomas Tsitas	3	0	1	0	1	0	0	0	5	0
22	FW	(Iceland) Eiður Guðjohnsen	6	1	4	0	0	0	4	0	14	1
33	FW	(Greece) Nikos Liberopoulos	24	7	6	3	1	0	4	0	35	10
77	FW	(Belgium) Viktor Klonaridis	15	3	4	1	0	0	3	1	22	5
93	FW	(Cyprus) Dimitris Froxylias	0	0	0	0	0	0	0	0	0	0
Left during Winter Transfer Window
6	DF	(Spain) Cala	13	1	0	0	2	0	6	0	21	1
92	DF	(Greece) Sokratis Tsoukalas	0	0	0	0	0	0	1	0	1	0
90	MF	(Greece) Savvas Gentsoglou	4	0	0	0	0	0	4	0	8	0
24	FW	(Australia) Nathan Burns	3	0	0	0	1	0	4	1	8	1

=== Goalscorers ===
As of 20 May 2012
The list is sorted by competition order when total goals are equal, then by position and then by squad number.

Rank	No.	Pos.	Player	Super League	Super League Play-offs	Greek Cup	Europa League	Total
1	9	FW	(Brazil) Leonardo	9	1	0	3	13
2	33	FW	(Greece) Nikos Liberopoulos	7	3	0	0	10
3	8	FW	(Cameroon) Steve Leo Beleck	5	0	1	0	6
4	77	FW	(Belgium) Victor Klonaridis	3	1	0	1	5
5	11	FW	(Greece) Dimitris Sialmas	2	0	0	2	4
5	10	MF	(Spain) José Carlos	1	1	0	2	4
7	14	MF	(Greece) Grigoris Makos	1	1	0	0	2
7	4	DF	(Greece) Kostas Manolas	1	0	0	1	2
9	6	DF	(Spain) Cala	1	0	0	0	1
9	21	MF	(Colombia) Fabián Vargas	1	0	0	0	1
9	1	MF	(Greece) Pantelis Kafes	1	0	0	0	1
9	22	FW	(Iceland) Eiður Guðjohnsen	1	0	0	0	1
9	24	FW	(Australia) Nathan Burns	0	0	0	1	1
Own goals				3	0	0	1	4
Totals				36	7	1	11	55

=== Assists ===
As of 20 May 2012
The list is sorted by competition order when total assists are equal, then by position and then by squad number.

Rank	No.	Pos.	Player	Super League	Super League Play-offs	Greek Cup	Europa League	Total
1	10	MF	(Spain) José Carlos	5	0	0	0	5
1	9	FW	(Brazil) Leonardo	3	0	0	2	5
1	7	MF	(Poland) Roger Guerreiro	3	0	0	2	5
4	8	FW	(Cameroon) Steve Leo Beleck	3	0	0	0	3
5	1	MF	(Greece) Pantelis Kafes	2	0	0	0	2
5	19	MF	(Greece) Panagiotis Lagos	2	0	0	0	2
5	77	FW	(Belgium) Victor Klonaridis	2	0	0	0	2
5	33	FW	(Greece) Nikos Liberopoulos	2	0	0	0	2
5	22	FW	(Iceland) Eiður Guðjohnsen	0	1	0	1	2
10	88	MF	(Greece) Taxiarchis Fountas	1	0	0	0	1
10	24	FW	(Australia) Nathan Burns	0	0	0	1	1
Totals				23	1	0	6	30

=== Clean sheets ===
As of 20 May 2012
The list is sorted by competition order when total clean sheets are equal and then by squad number. Clean sheets in games where both goalkeepers participated are awarded to the goalkeeper who started the game. Goalkeepers with no appearances are not included.

Rank	No.	Player	Super League	Super League Play-offs	Greek Cup	Europa League	Total
1	99	(Greece) Giannis Arabatzis	7	0	1	0	8
1	23	(Greece) Dimitrios Konstantopoulos	5	2	0	1	8
Totals			12	2	1	1	16

=== Disciplinary record ===
As of 20 May 2012

N	P	Nat.	Name	Super League			Super League Play-offs			Greek Cup			Europa League			Total			Notes
N	P	Nat.	Name	Yellow card	Second yellow card	Red card	Yellow card	Second yellow card	Red card	Yellow card	Second yellow card	Red card	Yellow card	Second yellow card	Red card	Yellow card	Second yellow card	Red card	Notes
Goalkeepers
23	GK	(Greece)	Dimitrios Konstantopoulos																
28	GK	(Greece)	Theodoros Moschonas																
99	GK	(Greece)	Giannis Arabatzis	4												4			
Defenders
2	DF	(Greece)	Giannis Kontoes	4			1						1			6			
3	DF	(Iceland)	Elfar Freyr Helgason																
4	DF	(Greece)	Kostas Manolas	9	1		1			1			3	1		14	2		
5	DF	(Greece)	Traianos Dellas	6									2	1		8	1		
15	DF	(Greece)	Nikolaos Karabelas	9			1						2			12			
16	DF	(Greece)	Anestis Argyriou	1						1						2			
31	DF	(Greece)	Nikolaos Georgeas	6									1			7			
47	DF	(Greece)	Mavroudis Bougaidis	1			2									3			
66	DF	(Cyprus)	Nikos Englezou																
Midfielders
1	MF	(Greece)	Pantelis Kafes	4			2						1			7			
7	MF	(Poland)	Roger Guerreiro	1												1			
10	MF	(Spain)	José Carlos	2						1			3			6			
13	MF	(Greece)	Antonis Rikka	4	1											4	1		
14	MF	(Greece)	Grigoris Makos	10	1		1						3		1	14	1	1	
17	MF	(Australia)	Paul Katsetis																
19	MF	(Greece)	Panagiotis Lagos	5			1						1			7			
21	MF	(Colombia)	Fabián Vargas	8			1						1			10			
88	MF	(Greece)	Taxiarchis Fountas				1									1			
Forwards
8	MF	(Cameroon)	Steve Leo Beleck	2												2			
9	FW	(Brazil)	Leonardo	6									1			7			
11	FW	(Greece)	Dimitris Sialmas	3	1											3	1		
12	FW	(Greece)	Thomas Tsitas																
22	FW	(Iceland)	Eiður Guðjohnsen	2									1			3			
33	FW	(Greece)	Nikos Liberopoulos	11			1									12			
77	FW	(Belgium)	Viktor Klonaridis	2												2			
93	FW	(Cyprus)	Dimitris Froxylias																
Left during Winter Transfer window
6	DF	(Spain)	Cala	5						1			3			9			
92	DF	(Greece)	Sokratis Tsoukalas																
90	MF	(Greece)	Savvas Gentsoglou	1												1			
24	FW	(Australia)	Nathan Burns																

=== Starting 11 ===
This section presents the most frequently used formation along with the players with the most starts across all competitions.

N.	Formation	Matchday(s)
23	4–2–3–1	1, 5, 7, 10–20, 22, 25, 26, 29
16	4–3–3	8, 9, 21, 23, 24, 27, 28, 30
4	4–4–2	3, 6
3	4–4–2 (D)	2, 4

No.	Nat.	Player	Pos.
99	(Greece)	Giannis Arabatzis	GK
4	(Greece)	Kostas Manolas	RCB
2	(Greece)	Giannis Kontoes	LCB
31	(Greece)	Nikolaos Georgeas	RB
3	(Greece)	Nikolaos Karabelas	LB
14	(Greece)	Grigoris Makos	DM
1	(Greece)	Pantelis Kafes (C)	CM
8	(Cameroon)	Steve Leo Beleck	RM
9	(Brazil)	Leonardo	LM
10	(Spain)	José Carlos	AM
33	(Greece)	Nikos Liberopoulos	CF

Last updated: 2012-05-20

== Awards ==
Player	Pos.	Award	Source
(Brazil) Leonardo	FW	MVP Award (1st Matchday)	
(Colombia) Fabián Vargas	MF	Best Goal Award (3rd Matchday)	
(Greece) Dimitrios Sialmas	FW	Best Goal Award (16th Matchday)	
