= Kostas Manolas =

Greek footballer (born 1991)

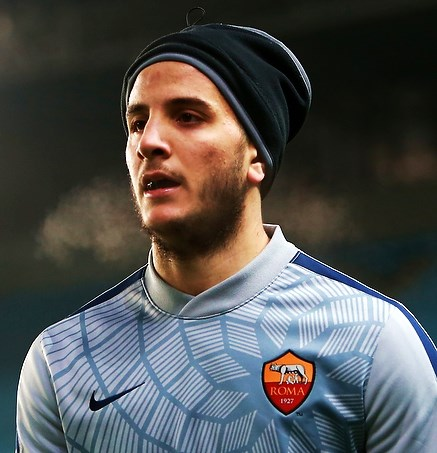
- Manolas warming up for Roma in 2014

Personal information
- Full name: Konstantinos Manolas
- Date of birth: 14 June 1991 (age 35)
- Place of birth: Athens, Greece
- Height: 1.87 m (6 ft 2 in)
- Positions: Defender; forward

Team information
- Current team: Pannaxiakos

Youth career
- 2003–2006: Pannaxiakos
- 2006–2007: AEK Athens
- 2007–2009: Thrasyvoulos

Senior career*
| Years | Team | Apps | (Gls) |
| 2008–2009 | Thrasyvoulos | 5 | (0) |
| 2009–2012 | AEK Athens | 66 | (3) |
| 2012–2014 | Olympiacos | 49 | (4) |
| 2014–2019 | Roma | 156 | (5) |
| 2019–2022 | Napoli | 60 | (4) |
| 2022 | Olympiacos | 14 | (0) |
| 2022–2024 | Sharjah | 26 | (0) |
| 2024 | Salernitana | 8 | (0) |
| 2024– | Pannaxiakos | 38 | (26) |

International career
| 2009–2011 | Greece U21 | 5 | (0) |
| 2013–2019 | Greece | 42 | (1) |
- * Club domestic league appearances and goals as of 15 April 2026

Konstantinos "Kostas" Manolas (Greek: Κωνσταντίνος "Κώστας" Μανωλάς; pronounced [konsta(n)ˈdinos ˈkostaz manoˈlas]; (Note: In isolation, Κώστας is pronounced [ˈkostas].) born 14 June 1991) is a Greek footballer who plays for Greek club Pannaxiakos. A defender throughout his career, Manolas also plays as a striker for Pannaxiakos since 2024.

== Club career ==
=== AEK Athens ===
==== 2009–10 season ====
Manolas began his youth career at Thrasyvoulos in 2008. In 2009, his uncle Stelios Manolas, who was the technical director of AEK Athens at the time, was scouting his nephew at a youth match with AEK manager Dušan Bajević and was impressed with his performance.

On 16 June 2009, Manolas signed a three-year deal with AEK. After signing, Manolas said, "I am very happy signing for the team I support, hopefully I can be a legend at the club like my uncle and end my career at AEK." He made his debut against Kavala and was named man of the match. After the game, he stated, "It's a dream to play for the club I love." Manolas was also rewarded with man of the match honours the following week against PAOK. In his first seven matches, Manolas was named man of the match in five of them.

Manolas scored his first professional goal against archrivals Olympiacos on 19 May 2010. Although he was playing with a broken jugal bone since the first minute of the match after a dangerous nudge by Kostas Mitroglou, he scored in the sixth minute, though he later left the match in the 15th minute. He refused to be taken to the hospital before the match was over, despite being urged by his uncle Stelios Manolas. The next day, he underwent a successful three-hour surgery, recovered and quickly returned to training sessions.

==== 2010–11 season ====
Manolas was a key figure for AEK Athens in the 2010–11 season, playing impressive performances in the Super League Greece but also in the 2010–11 UEFA Europa League, which drew interest from many European teams such as Genoa, Udinese, Getafe and Schalke 04. Manolas scored a very important goal for AEK against Hajduk Split, securing the win for the Greek side. The following week, Manolas found the back of the net again, this time against AEL in the Greek Cup, which AEK would later go on to win. His impressive performances convinced then AEK Athens coach Manolo Jiménez and earned him a spot in the starting line-up, forcing Real Madrid loanee David Mateos to the substitutes' bench.

Manolas developed massively while playing alongside AEK icon and UEFA Euro 2004 winner Traianos Dellas, stating to the press: "It is an honour to play alongside such a great player like Dellas, I have developed and become a better player. His experience has helped me become confident on the ball and the decisions I make in the game. I have learned a lot from him and he is basically like a teacher to me who I look up to."

On 30 April 2011, Manolas won the first trophy of his career, the Greek Cup. He played a large role in winning the trophy and played solid throughout the match against Atromitos, where at one point he cleared an opposition shot off his line. Manolas also received man of the match honours due to his outstanding display. After the 0–3 victory, Manolas stated, "It is a dream for me to win a trophy with my childhood club AEK, and I hope there's many more to come in the future." He finished the 2010–11 season playing 36 matches, scoring three goals.

==== 2011–12 season ====
On 11 July 2011, Manolas signed a three-year contract extension with AEK, keeping him at the club until 2014. His contract was worth €900,000 earning €300,000 per-season including bonuses that could reach up to €1.4 million. Manolas renewed his contract despite interested from big European outfits Werder Bremen, Sevilla, Wolfsburg and Hamburger SV. Manolas agreed with AEK on €4 million buyout clause for foreign teams and a €10 million buyout clause for Greek teams.

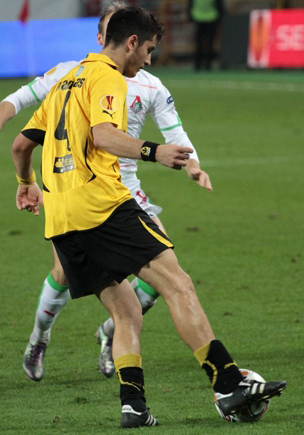
Manolas playing for AEK in 2011.

Shortly after signing the contract, Manolas stated to the press, "I am extremely happy that I am going to continue playing for the team of my heart and it is an honour to wear the AEK Jersey for the next three years with my childhood club. I applaud AEK president Stavros Adamidis who believes in me and declined great offers from European teams to keep me at the club despite the huge economical problems the club is suffering. My dream now is to become the team's captain and win the league just like my uncle Stelios Manolas, who achieved this when he joined AEK."

Manolas started the season positively, playing his first competitive match of the 2011–12 season against Georgian side Dinamo Tbilisi in a 2011–12 UEFA Europa League qualifier, helping AEK to 1–0 victory. He was given heavy praise from Manolo Jiménez. Manolas scored his first goal of the season in a 0–1 away victory over Panionios. He dedicated the goal to Jiménez, who had been taking criticism in recent weeks for his team's poor performances. Manolas also scored the first goal for AEK Athens in a 1–3 away win against Austrian club Sturm Graz in the Europa League. During the January transfer period, the English Premier League's Everton showed sincere interest in the young centre back, with the team's then-manager David Moyes stating: "Manolas has huge talent and is a player for the future." On 30 January 2012, it was said that AEK and Everton had agreed on terms to sell Manolas to Everton. Manolas, however, declined the offer, as he felt he would be leaving his club in a bad situation as the club would have only had three centre backs in the squad: Traianos Dellas and two youth players Mavroudis Bougaidis and Elfar Freyr Helgason after the departure of loanee Cala, who was recalled to his club Sevilla. AEK Chairman Stavros Adamidis stated: "It was Manolas who declined the offer, not AEK." He left AEK Athens having 85 appearances (6 goals) in all competitions.

=== Olympiacos ===
==== 2012–13 season ====
On 1 July 2012, Manolas joined rivals Olympiacos on a free transfer until 30 June 2016 after his contract with AEK Athens had expired. "I am very happy that I'm at Olympiacos and I can't wait to play with the red and white shirt in front of a full Karaiskaki and our fans," Manolas said. At a time where AEK were struggling to pay off crippling debts, the departure of one of the club's key players came as another major blow. Ahead of the next season, AEK were only able to buy and sell Greek players up to the age of 22 and were barred from purchasing foreign players, as punishment for failing to meet the Greek Super League's financial criteria. AEK were allowed to renew the contracts of any player already at the club, whether their highest earners would be willing to remain at a club that has a history of failing to pay player wages remained to be seen. Moreover, AEK were also banned from taking part in the Europa League that season by the Hellenic Football Federation, with their place taken by Asteras Tripolis.

Manolas made his Olympiacos debut against PAS Giannina on 15 September in a 1–2 away win, then scored his first goal for his new side against Skoda Xanthi in a 4–0 home win. Manolas made 24 appearances for Olympiacos in the league that season, helping them win the Super League. On 11 May 2013, he played in the Greek Cup Final against Asteras Tripoli, winning 3–1 to clinch a league and cup double for the season.

==== 2013–14 season ====
Reports in Greece suggested that English clubs Tottenham Hotspur, Sunderland and Fulham were all keeping an eye on Manolas ahead of the January transfer window. According to Gazzetta.gr, Manolas had captured the attention of Premier League scouts since moving to Olympiacos on a free transfer from AEK the previous summer. It was thought that Manolas could be interested in a move to the Premier League to push his case for continued inclusion in the Greece national team manager Fernando Santos' plans, with Greece at the time in second place in their World Cup qualifying group behind Bosnia and Herzegovina. Manolas, however, was unlikely to seriously consider any move that would see his chances of first-team football jeopardised. It was also reported that then-Manchester United head coach David Moyes targeted the Olympiacos defender as a replacement for Nemanja Vidić after confirming the latter's departure from Old Trafford at the end of 2013–14 season to Internazionale, while United's other starting central defender, Rio Ferdinand, would later follow his teammate out, leaving United short of quality in central defence. Moyes would end up being sacked and rumours of a move immediately ceased.

Manolas scored his first goal for Olympiacos in the 2013–14 UEFA Champions League in a 1–0 home win against Benfica, building the foundations for the next round. He scored his second goal in the Champions League in a 2–1 away loss against Paris Saint-Germain, though nonetheless the squad secured a spot in the round of 16—the first time the club had reached the stage since 2009–10—in matchup against Manchester United. With United failing to display their usual dominant domestic form that term, Manolas thought the Greek champions had what it takes to make the Champions League quarter-finals for only the second time: "I believe we will give a good performance. I hope Manchester United will not get better than they are now, so we can defeat them." Despite winning the first leg 2–0 at home, Olympiacos fell as Manchester United's Robin van Persie hit a hat-trick in the return leg in Manchester to progress 3–2 on aggregate.

On 22 March 2014, Manolas extended his contract with Olympiacos for another year, keeping him at the club until the summer of 2017. He left Olympiacos having 73 appearances (6 goals, 2 assists) in all competitions.

=== Roma ===
==== 2014–15 season ====
On 27 August 2014, Italian Serie A side Roma announced the signing of Manolas for an estimated fee of €15 million. Upon joining Roma, Manolas said, "I had offers from several big clubs, including Juve. But it was my decision to come here to Roma. I wanted to come to Roma. Lots of people told me good things. Their advice and my decision is what brought me here. The club has big goals. I want to win the Scudetto, as does the whole squad. We can also go far in the Champions League."

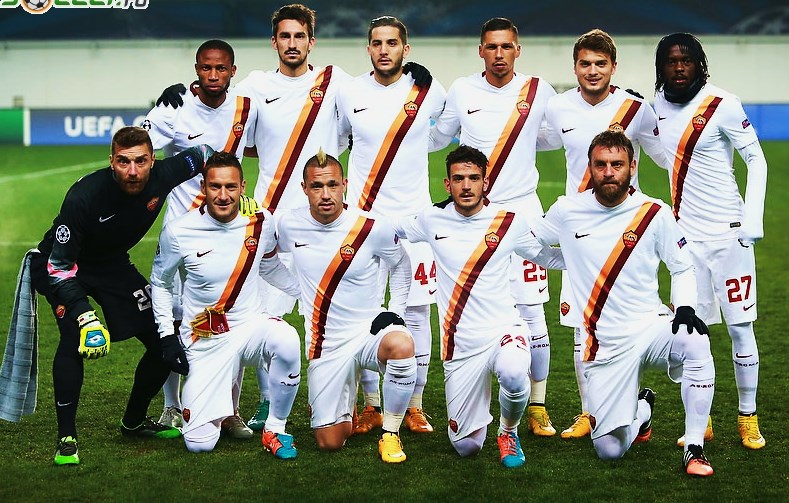
Manolas (top, left-centre) lining up for Roma before the match against CSKA Moscow, 25 November 2014.

On 30 August 2014, Manolas made his official debut for Roma as they beat Fiorentina 2–0 in the opening game of the 2014–15 Serie A season. On 17 September, he made his first European appearance with Roma in the Champions League as they cruised to an impressive 5–1 victory over CSKA Moscow. On 5 October, Manolas was sent off in a match against Juventus for retaliating after being fouled by Álvaro Morata, who was sent off as well. The Italian Football Federation (FIGC) subsequently banned Manolas for two games for his part in the altercation.

Manolas' impressive first year with his club garnered interest from many other European sides, including Premier League giants Arsenal, though the player's agent, Mino Raiola, said that Manolas was not interested in discussing the rumours: "Kostas is a Roma player, and anyone who wants him will have to ask the club. All I can say is the lad has a contract until 2019. Roma paid a lot for him, and that means they have a lot of expectations for him."

Manolas enjoyed an excellent first season in Serie A, cementing his place at the heart of manager Rudi Garcia's defence as his side finished second in the league table. In the ensuing close season, Arsenal offered Roma £15 million for the player, whom they originally tried to sign last summer before being beaten by Roma. On 19 June 2015, at the end of the season, Manolas, via a Roma fan poll, was named the club's "best purchase of the season" after capturing 56% of the vote, in front of the likes of Seydou Keita (18%) and Juan Iturbe (8%).

==== 2015–16 season ====
Manolas began the 2015–16 campaign as the de facto leader of the Roma defence. According to Tuttomercatoweb, Chelsea manager José Mourinho attempted to bring the Greek international to Stamford Bridge the previous season, and will try again in the New Year, with Arsenal and Tottenham Hotspur continuing their interest. On 17 September 2015, after the 1–1 home draw against 2014–15 Champions League title holders Barcelona, Manolas praised his club's tactical performance: "We played a great game on a tactical level. We've been doing well in defence, and I think it's an important step for the team," he told Sky Sports. On 23 September, Roma's unbeaten start to the season ended after losing 2–1 away at Sampdoria, with Manolas scoring an own goal.

On 26 September, Manolas scored his first goal in the 2015–16 Serie A as Roma comfortably defeated newly promoted side Carpi 5–1. He opened the scoring after netting Lucas Digne's clever assist with his right boot besides the challenge in the box from Carpi's Gabriel Silva.

On 5 December, in a dramatic 1–1 away draw against Torino in domestic league action, Manolas brought down Andrea Belotti inside the area, whereupon Maxi López coolly converted the subsequent 94th-minute penalty kick. Despite replays suggesting the Greek defender may well have gotten the ball in the challenge, the referee nonetheless awarded the penalty. On 11 December, towards the end of a Champions League match against Belarusians BATE Borisov, Manolas engaged in a quarrel with teammate Miralem Pjanić for mishandling a ball possession. As reported by La Gazzetta dello Sport, the two players continued the fighting into the team's locker room.

On 17 February 2016, in a 1st leg UEFA Champions League game for the last 16, he was the indisputable leader of the defence, despite the 2–0 home loss from the Spanish giants Real Madrid. Manolas closed down Karim Benzema quite well throughout the game. Most of the low crosses were taken care of well by him but he could do nothing about the two goals. On 20 April 2016, in a match for Serie A, Manolas scored his second goal in the season, giving an assist in a glorious home win against Torino.

==== 2016–17 season ====
On 25 July 2016, coach Luciano Spalletti has insisted that the international defender is happy at Roma and will stay at the club, despite every summer speculations involving Manchester United, Arsenal and Chelsea's interest about the Greek defender. Arsenal were so displeased by the way Roma handled the talks that they later refused to allow Jack Wilshere to go there on loan. Manolas began the 2016–17 campaign as the de facto leader of the Roma defence.

In September 2016, Roma are obliged to pay the sum of €6.5 million to Olympiacos for the international defender. Roma did not want to sell the Greek defender this summer as Olympiacos had a 50% next percentage sale until this August. Roma also rejected a bid from Arsenal in the region of €39 million for Manolas and therefore the player stayed put. Thus, Olympiacos received from Roma the fee of €6.5 million and Roma activated the clause obtaining the 100% of the player. Manolas was considered the best marker in 'calcio' and Barcelona had been following him for a while. The Greek international had always been on a list of defenders that Barcelona were been interested in. With Thomas Vermaelen's loan to Roma, they received an option to buy on Manolas at the summer of 2017. On 2 October 2016, he scored the second goal sealing a 2–1 home win against rivals Inter, as well as making the Inter captain Mauro Icardi disappear. On 18 October 2016, Manolas rejected Roma's proposal on the extension of his contract, which expired in 2019, despite the fact that the management were ready to raise the salary of the Greek centre back from €1.8 million to €2.5 million per year. According to the newspapers sources, the 25-year-old international player saw that almost 12 players had a higher salary than his and now expects an improved offer.

On 23 October 2016, Manolas reached 100 appearances with the jersey of Roma, in a 4–1 home win Serie A game against Palermo. On 31 October, he broke his nose in Roma's 0–0 away draw against Empoli, in a game where the Greek defender simply covered every possible hole, thus missing the Europa League clash against Austria Wien and a Serie A match against Bologna at the Olimpico. On 4 December 2016, in one of the most spectacular Roman derbies in history, Manolas showed the usual ability both in anticipating and blocking his opponents, giving Balde Diao Keita and Ciro Immobile a very difficult afternoon. On 13 December 2016, Roma's center-back trio had an amazing performance, especially Manolas and Federico Fazio, who combined 15 clearances, 11 interceptions and won 12 duels. Manolas' impact surpassed just defensive duties, as he assisted for Radja Nainggolan's 1–0 winner against A.C. Milan. On 18 December 2016, it was announced that Manolas, according to a doctors' report, would be out for around two weeks after picking up another injury in Roma's 1–0 defeat to Juventus. Manolas was forced off in the latter stages at the Juventus Stadium, and he subsequently missed Roma's match against Chievo, with the defender having already been struck down with a broken nose and muscle strain this season. On 8 January 2017, he returned to the squad playing as a late substitute in a 1–0 away win against Genoa. On 25 May 2017, a week before the end of the season, Manolas and Diego Perotti came a step away from getting into a physical conflict during training. To avoid the worst, only the provisional intervention of teammates, along with Luciano Spalletti's decision to send them to the dressing room without even finishing the training, helped to lower the tension.

==== 2017–18 season ====
Despite a possible move to Zenit, potentially following teammate Leandro Paredes during the summer of 2017, Manolas remained at Roma for the 2017–18 season. On 27 September 2017, he opened the scoring in a 2–1 away win against Qarabağ in the UEFA Champions League Group stage.

On 2 December 2017, the Greek international renewed his contract with the Giallorossi, until 2022, with a release clause set at €35 million. On 15 October 2017, the Greek defender was substituted during the Serie A match against Napoli that took place at the Stadio Olimpico in Rome. The Greek defender was out for almost a month due to a Grade I strain of his left adductor longus (thigh) muscle. On 31 October 2017, he returned to the squad in a convincing 3–0 Champions League home game against English champions Chelsea On 5 November 2017, he scored his first goal in 2017-18 season from an Edin Džeko assist in a 4–2 away win against Fiorentina.

On 9 March 2018, he scored the first goal in a 3–0 win with a header against Torino after an assist by Alessandro Florenzi with a cross following a corner. After his goal, Manolas dropped to his knees and pointed to the sky in tribute to Davide Astori, the Fiorentina captain who died on 4 March. On 4 April 2018, in a frustrating 4–1 away loss for 2017–18 Champions League quarter finals first leg to Barcelona, Manolas scored Roma's second own-goal after a clearance that in turn hit the right post, Samuel Umtiti and the Greek defender. However, Manolas more than compensated for the first leg performance as he brilliantly headed the final goal in the Giallorossi's 3–0 dominant victory over the Blaugrana in the return leg, sending Roma to the Champions League semi-finals for the first time since 1984. On 21 April 2018, Manolas captained his first match with the club against SPAL during a 3–0 away win in Serie A, after receiving the armband from his teammate Radja Nainggolan.

Manolas was one of Roma's most consistent players over the course of the campaign, proving to be a reliable figure in the Italians' defence.

==== 2018–19 season ====
Despite the yearly summer rumours surrounding his possible departure from the club, Manolas remained at Roma for a fifth season, aiming to win his first title with the club during the 2018–19 season. On 27 August 2018, Manolas scored against Atalanta, as he tapped in Javier Pastore's chipped free kick at the far post, helping Roma complete a comeback from 3–1 down to 3–3 at the Stadio Olimpico. On 7 November, Manolas scored with a glancing header from very close range, placing the ball high and in the centre of the goal, from an assist by Lorenzo Pellegrini with a cross following a corner, helping his club to a vital 2–1 away win against CSKA Moscow in the group stage of the UEFA Champions League. His impressive performance saw him included in UEFA Champions League's team of the week the following day. On 15 November, Manolas was forced off during Greece's 1–0 win over Finland due to a blow to the adductor magnus muscle in his leg.

On 6 March 2019, Manolas made his 200th appearance in all competitions with Roma in the second leg of the club's round of 16 UEFA Champions League tie against Porto; Manolas played the full 120 minutes as Roma lost 3–1 at home to exit the Champions League. Reports from the Italian media later confirmed that the 27-year-old had strained a muscle, and would miss around three weeks of action, meaning that he would not be expected to participate in his nation's UEFA Euro 2020 qualifying matches against Liechtenstein and Bosnia and Herzegovina.

=== Napoli ===
==== 2019–20 season ====
On 27 June 2019, Manolas was said to be close to a move to Napoli, after Roma and the Neapolitan club reached a deal for him. Manolas agreed to pen a five-year contract with the latter club, with annual earnings of €4.5 million (including bonuses). Napoli officially purchased the defender for €34m plus a €2m signing-on fee, effectively activating his release clause. However, in the agreement between the two Italian sides, Roma purchased defensive midfielder Amadou Diawara for €18m plus €3m in add-ons. Manolas had also been linked with Juventus, Milan and Arsenal. He officially signed for Napoli on 30 June.

On 24 August 2019, he made his debut with the club, starting in the 4–3 away win against Fiorentina. A week later he scored his first goal for the club in a thrilling 4–3 away loss against Juventus, netting a goal with a header after a beautiful free-kick from Mário Rui. On 28 September, Manolas scored his second goal of the season with a header after Nikola Maksimović's corner, helping his club seal a 2–1 home win game against Brescia.

On 31 December, Manolas was included in the Roma Team of the Decade.

On 29 February 2020, Manolas connected with Lorenzo Insigne's free-kick from the right wing, thumping a header into the net to give Napoli the lead in a 2–1 home win game against Torino.

On 16 May, Manolas was the first Napoli player to get injured since training resumed after the COVID-19 pandemic in Italy. His club did not mention how long he would be out for, but 'Corriere dello Sport' reported that he would miss six weeks.

==== 2020–21 season ====
On 20 September 2020, Manolas was a starter in a 2–0 away win against Parma.

On 12 January 2021, Napoli confirmed that Manolas had suffered a first-degree muscle injury. The Partenopei defender was replaced by Nikola Maksimovic after 15 minutes of the 2–1 win against Udinese.

On 8 February 2021, Napoli confirmed that Manolas would be out for three weeks, as he suffered a second-degree sprain and damaged the ligament in the right ankle. The Greek defender was substituted at the Marassi and carried out tests at the Pineta Grande clinic. He made his return to the squad as a late substitute against Sassuolo on 3 March, but conceded a late penalty which Sassuolo converted to end the match in a 3–3 draw.

==== 2021–22 season ====
In August 2021, it was reported that Olympiacos had started negotiations with Napoli for the purchase of Manolas, with the player telling the club that he desired a return to Greece. Despite the transfer rumours, he was a starter in the opening Serie A match of the season against Venezia.

On 21 October 2021, Manolas suffered an injury during Napoli's Europa League clash against Legia Warsaw. He was forced off the pitch in the 72nd minute with a suspected muscle injury. In December 2021, having lost his place in the starting lineup to Amir Rrahmani, Manolas again expressed his desire to leave the club. On 10 December, he made his first appearance for almost two months as a late substitute in a 3–2 home win game against Leicester City in the Europa League.

=== Return to Olympiacos ===
==== 2021–22 season ====
On 16 December 2021, Napoli announced an agreement for the sale of Manolas to Olympiacos in January 2022. The fee of the deal was reportedly €2.5 million. On April 16, 2014, and in the second game of the semifinals of the Greek Cup against PAOK, Manolas had made his last appearance with the jersey of Olympiacos and eight years later, he came on as a substitute in the game against Apollon Smyrnis in the Georgios Kamaras Stadium, replacing Avraam Papadopoulos.

=== Sharjah ===
In late September 2022, Manolas joined Emirati club Sharjah. On 17 January 2024, after 18 months with the side, his contract was terminated by mutual agreement.

=== Salernitana ===
On 8 February 2024, Manolas returned to Serie A to sign a short-term deal with Salernitana. He joined Filippo Inzaghi's side on a contract that expired in June 2024.

=== Pannaxiakos ===
On 16 October 2024, Manolas returned to his boyhood club, Pannaxiakos in the Cyclades FCA First Division, signing a one-year deal. He scored five goals on his debut against Marpissaikos five days later, as Pannaxiakos ran out 12–1 winners.

In the 2025–26 season, Manolas helped Pannaxiakos win the Cyclades championship and secure promotion to the Gamma Ethniki for the 2026–27 season.

== International career ==
Following a continued stretch of form from Manolas, former Greece national team manager Otto Rehhagel called Manolas up for the 30-man provisional World Cup squad for the 2010 FIFA World Cup, though he failed to make the final 23-man squad. Manolas would wait roughly three more years before eventually making his international debut against Switzerland in a friendly. Leading up to the 2014 World Cup, Manolas' strong 2013–14 season with Olympiacos earned him a spot in manager Fernando Santos' final 23-man squad for the tournament. It was in Brazil where the centre-back really caught the attention of the watching world, with a string of imperious displays that carried Greece into the knockout stages of the tournament for the first time in its history. He was named by The Independent as being among the 50 best players at the World Cup, as the Greeks ultimately fell to Costa Rica.

On 9 June 2017, Manolas and his Roma teammate Edin Dzeko came to blows during an ugly brawl in World Cup qualifier game between Bosnia-Herzegovina and Greece. The game ended 0–0 and descended into chaos after the final whistle, when numerous players and members of staff clashed.

On 12 September 2018, Manolas netted his first goal with Greece, leaping over his marker to head a free kick through the goalkeeper's hands in a 2–1 away loss against Hungary for the Nations League.

== Style of play ==
Manolas profile includes the speed to keep track of agile attackers and have the strength used in physical challenges. During defensive role, he is attentive in marking of opponents. When playing other roles, he is able to sweep up behind a high-line but also having the versatility to play deeper. Although his primary role is that of a stopper, he also participates in the team's build-up play through his passing. His playing style combines traditional centre-half defense characteristics with modern tactical forms for ball distribution. Additionally he is noted for his tackling and ability in the air.

== Personal life ==
Manolas is the nephew of the legendary Greek footballer Stelios Manolas, and the cousin of Konstantinos Manolas.

He is a fluent speaker of Greek, Italian, and English.

== Career statistics ==
=== Club ===
As of match played 22 November 2026

Appearances and goals by club, season and competition
| Club | Season | League | | | National cup (Note: Includes Greek Cup, Coppa Italia, UAE President's Cup) | | League cup (Note: Includes UAE League Cup) | | Continental | | Other | | Total | |
| Club | Season | Division | Apps | Goals | Apps | Goals | Apps | Goals | Apps | Goals | Apps | Goals | Apps | Goals |
|---|---|---|---|---|---|---|---|---|---|---|---|---|---|---|
| Thrasyvoulos | 2008–09 | Super League Greece | 5 | 0 | — | | — | | — | | — | | 5 | 0 |
| AEK Athens | 2009–10 | Super League Greece | 10 | 1 | 1 | 0 | — | | — | | — | | 11 | 1 |
| AEK Athens | 2010–11 | Super League Greece | 27 | 1 | 3 | 1 | — | | 6 (Note: Appearances in UEFA Europa League) | 1 | — | | 36 | 3 |
| AEK Athens | 2011–12 | Super League Greece | 29 | 1 | 2 | 0 | — | | 7 | 1 | — | | 38 | 2 |
| AEK Athens | Total | | 66 | 3 | 6 | 1 | — | | 13 | 2 | — | | 85 | 6 |
| Olympiacos | 2012–13 | Super League Greece | 24 | 1 | 6 | 0 | — | | 7 (Note: Six appearances in UEFA Champions League, one appearance in UEFA Europa League) | 0 | — | | 37 | 1 |
| Olympiacos | 2013–14 | Super League Greece | 25 | 3 | 5 | 0 | — | | 7 (Note: Appearances in UEFA Champions League) | 2 | — | | 37 | 5 |
| Olympiacos | Total | | 49 | 4 | 11 | 0 | — | | 14 | 2 | — | | 74 | 6 |
| Roma | 2014–15 | Serie A | 30 | 0 | 1 | 0 | — | | 10 (Note: Six appearances in UEFA Champions League, four appearances in UEFA Europa League) | 0 | — | | 41 | 0 |
| Roma | 2015–16 | Serie A | 37 | 2 | 0 | 0 | — | | 8 | 0 | — | | 45 | 2 |
| Roma | 2016–17 | Serie A | 33 | 0 | 3 | 0 | — | | 9 (Note: Two appearances in UEFA Champions League, seven appearances in UEFA Europa League) | 0 | — | | 45 | 0 |
| Roma | 2017–18 | Serie A | 29 | 2 | 0 | 0 | — | | 11 | 2 | — | | 40 | 4 |
| Roma | 2018–19 | Serie A | 27 | 1 | 1 | 0 | — | | 7 | 1 | — | | 35 | 2 |
| Roma | Total | | 156 | 5 | 5 | 0 | — | | 45 | 3 | — | | 206 | 8 |
| Napoli | 2019–20 | Serie A | 26 | 4 | 3 | 0 | — | | 6 | 0 | — | | 35 | 4 |
| Napoli | 2020–21 | Serie A | 30 | 0 | 2 | 0 | — | | 0 | 0 | 1 (Note: Appearance in Supercoppa Italiana) | 0 | 33 | 0 |
| Napoli | 2021–22 | Serie A | 4 | 0 | 0 | 0 | — | | 3 | 0 | — | | 7 | 0 |
| Napoli | Total | | 60 | 4 | 5 | 0 | — | | 9 | 0 | 1 | 0 | 75 | 4 |
| Olympiacos | 2021–22 | Super League Greece | 11 | 0 | 1 | 0 | — | | 2 | 0 | — | | 14 | 0 |
| Olympiacos | 2022–23 | Super League Greece | 3 | 0 | 0 | 0 | — | | 5 (Note: Two appearances in UEFA Champions League, three appearances in UEFA Europa League) | 0 | — | | 8 | 0 |
| Olympiacos | Total | | 14 | 0 | 1 | 0 | — | | 7 | 0 | — | | 22 | 0 |
| Sharjah | 2022–23 | UAE Pro League | 18 | 0 | 3 | 0 | 5 | 0 | — | | 1 (Note: Appearance in UAE Super Cup) | 0 | 27 | 0 |
| Sharjah | 2023–24 | UAE Pro League | 8 | 0 | 0 | 0 | 2 | 0 | 3 (Note: Appearances in AFC Champions League) | 0 | 1 | 0 | 14 | 0 |
| Sharjah | Total | | 26 | 0 | 3 | 0 | 7 | 0 | 3 | 0 | 2 | 0 | 41 | 0 |
| Salernitana | 2023–24 | Serie A | 8 | 0 | — | | — | | — | | — | | 8 | 0 |
| Pannaxiakos | 2024–25 | Cyclades FCA First Division | 16 | 22 | — | | — | | — | | 2 (Note: Appearances in Gamma Ethniki promotion play-offs) | 0 | 18 | 22 |
| Pannaxiakos | 2025–26 | Cyclades FCA First Division | 14 | 4 | 3 (Note: Appearances in Cyclades FCA Cup) | 0 | — | | — | | — | | 17 | 4 |
| Pannaxiakos | 2026–27 | Gamma Ethniki | 8 | 0 | 1 (Note: Appearances in Greek Football Amateur Cup) | 0 | 0 | 0 | 0 | 0 | 0 | 0 | 9 | 0 |
| Pannaxiakos | Total | | 38 | 26 | 4 | 0 | — | | — | | 2 | 0 | 44 | 26 |
| Career total | | | 423 | 42 | 35 | 1 | 7 | 0 | 91 | 7 | 5 | 0 | 559 | 50 |

=== International ===
Appearances and goals by national team and year
| National team | Year | Apps | Goals |
|---|---|---|---|
| Greece | 2013 | 5 | 0 |
| Greece | 2014 | 13 | 0 |
| Greece | 2015 | 4 | 0 |
| Greece | 2016 | 5 | 0 |
| Greece | 2017 | 6 | 0 |
| Greece | 2018 | 6 | 1 |
| Greece | 2019 | 3 | 0 |
| Total | | 42 | 1 |

Scores and results list Greece's goal tally first.

List of international goals scored by Kostas Manolas
| No. | Date | Venue | Opponent | Score | Result | Competition |
|---|---|---|---|---|---|---|
| 1 | 11 September 2018 | Ferencváros Stadion, Budapest, Hungary | Hungary | 1–1 | 1–2 | 2018–19 UEFA Nations League C |

== Honours ==
AEK Athens

- Greek Cup: 2010–11

Olympiacos

- Super League Greece: 2012–13, 2013–14, 2021–22
- Greek Cup: 2012–13

Napoli

- Coppa Italia: 2019–20

Sharjah

- UAE President's Cup: 2022–23
- UAE League Cup: 2022–23
- UAE Super Cup: 2022

Pannaxiakos

- Cyclades FCA First Division: 2025–26
- Cyclades FCA Cup: 2025–26

Individual

- PSAP Best Greek Player playing Abroad: 2017–18
- UEFA's Top 50 Footballers: 2018
- Roma Team of the Decade: 2010–2020
