= Giannis Kontoes =

Greek footballer (born 1986)

Personal information
- Full name: Ioannis Kontoes
- Date of birth: 24 May 1986 (age 40)
- Place of birth: Athens, Greece
- Height: 1.80 m (5 ft 11 in)
- Position: Defender

Team information
- Current team: Asteras Tripolis B (manager)

Senior career*
Years	Team	Apps	(Gls)
2004–2005	Agios Dimitrios	3	(0)
2005–2006	Athinaikos		
2006–2007	Fostiras		
2007–2011	Panionios	73	(0)
2011–2013	AEK Athens	43	(0)
2013–2014	Asteras Tripolis	41	(0)
2014–2017	Atromitos	54	(0)
2017–2019	Apollon Smyrnis	44	(1)
2019–2020	CFR Cluj	0	(0)
2020	→ Academica Clinceni (loan)	13	(0)
2020–2022	Panionios	31	(5)

Managerial career
- 2022–2023: Ionikos (assistant)
- 2023: Cartagena (assistant)
- 2024–2025: Olimpija Ljubljana (assistant)
- 2025: Panathinaikos (assistant)
- 2026–: Asteras Tripolis B
- 2026–: Asteras Tripolis (interim)
- * Club domestic league appearances and goals

Giannis Kontoes (Greek: Γιάννης Κοντοές; born 24 May 1986), nicknamed The Tiger, is a Greek former professional footballer who played as a defender. Currently working as a manager.

Kontoes is known for his technical ability, solid defending, pace and constant overlapping runs. Kontoes also got the most assists for Panionios in the season 2010–11. Kontoes was listed as best left back in the starting 11 by Super League Greece due to his consistent performances.

== Career ==
=== Panionios ===
In 2007 he was signed by Panionios, where he played for the first time in the Super League. He quickly became a regular and was rewarded for his efforts with a new contract. He also had a very impressive season at Panionios and was named Panionios' player of the year and the best left-back in the league. In the summer of 2011, after his contract was expired, Panionios tried to keep Kontoes and offered a higher contract, however the latter declined the offer and signed with AEK Athens, as he wanted to play in European competitions and contend for the league.

=== AEK Athens ===
On 1 August 2011, Kontoes signed a three-year deal with AEK Athens on a free transfer. Kontoes was a key target for AEK Athens as he is a versatile player who can play as right back, left back and centre back. He made his debut for AEK Athens in a 1–0 away win against Skoda Xanthi. Kontoes' second match of the season was against his former club, Panionios, where he received a lot of criticism from the fans as he left the club after 4 years and joined Athens rivals, AEK. Despite the criticism, Kontoes played a very solid game and was awarded the MVP award, in a 1–0 away win for AEK Athens.

Kontoes became quickly very important for his team and the following season season became one of the leaders in the "yellow-black" squad. He played mainly as a left back, but also and as a center back. In December 2012, Kontoes decided to terminate his contract with AEK Athens due to financial reasons.

=== Asteras Tripolis ===
On 30 January 2013, Kontoes signed a deal with Asteras Tripolis. On 24 February 2013, he made his debut with the club in a 1–0 home win against Levadiakos.

=== Atromitos ===
On 4 September 2014 Kontoes signed a deal with Atromitos, replacing Kostas Giannoulis who moved to Olympiakos. On 14 September, he made his debut with the club in a 0–0 home draw against Panetolikos. On 19 June 2015, he extended his contract with the club by two years for an undisclosed fee. On 17 May 2017, he solved his contract with Atromitos after 3 consecutive years with the club.

=== Apollon Smyrnis ===
On 29 June 2017 Apollon Smyrnis announced the signing of Kontoes. On 5 February 2018, he scored his first goal in his professional career in a 1–1 away draw game against Platanias.

=== Academica Clinceni ===
On 31 January 2020, Romanian club Academica Clinceni announced the signing of Kontoes on loan from CFR Cluj, until the end of the 2019–20 season. The 33-year-old defender was signed a contract with Cluj for the 2019-20 season, but did not play in any official game during the first half of the season.
