= Fabián Vargas =

Colombian footballer (born 1980)

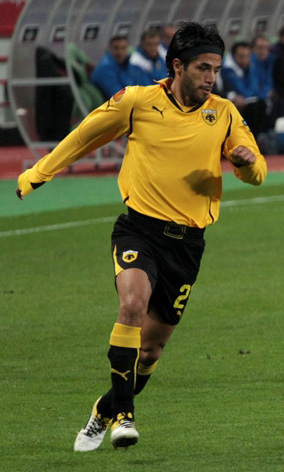
- Vargas with AEK Athens in 2011

Personal information
- Full name: Fabián Andrés Vargas Rivera
- Date of birth: 17 April 1980 (age 46)
- Place of birth: Bogotá, Colombia
- Height: 1.78 m (5 ft 10 in)
- Position: Midfielder

Youth career
- 1996–1997: América de Cali

Senior career*
Years	Team	Apps	(Gls)
1998–2003	América de Cali	153	(5)
2003–2009	Boca Juniors	106	(4)
2006–2007	→ Internacional (loan)	8	(0)
2009–2011	Almería	30	(1)
2011–2012	AEK Athens	23	(1)
2012–2013	Independiente	29	(0)
2013	Barcelona SC	9	(0)
2014–2016	Millonarios	63	(3)
2016–2018	La Equidad	54	(0)
Total		475	(14)

International career
1999–2009	Colombia	41	(0)
- * Club domestic league appearances and goals

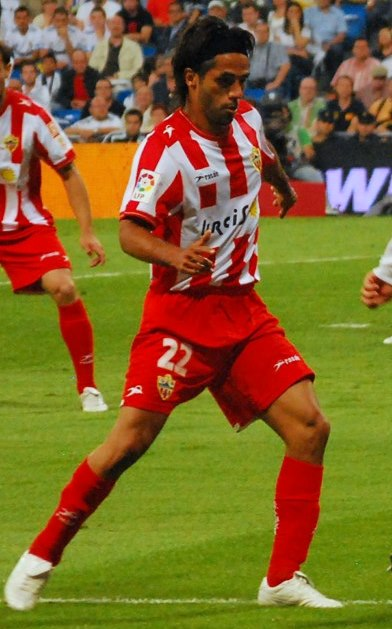
Vargas with Almería in 2011

Fabián Andrés Vargas Rivera (born 17 April 1980) is a Colombian former professional footballer who played as a midfielder. He spent most of his professional career playing for América de Cali and Boca Juniors, making more than 100 appearances for both clubs. He also played for Internacional, Almería, AEK Athens, Independiente, Barcelona SC, Millonarios, and La Equidad. At international level, he played for the Colombia national team 41 times and also captained the side.

== Career ==
Vargas began his career with América de Cali aged 18, in 1998. He played there for five years before transferring to Boca Juniors in 2003.

While on loan at Brazilian side SC Internacional from Boca Juniors, Vargas played in the side which beat Barcelona 1–0 at the 2006 FIFA Club World Cup Final in Japan.

On 18 June 2009, Vargas signed a three-year deal with Spanish club UD Almería for a fee worth €4million ($6.5 million). On 5 September 2009, he broke his fibula during a 2010 World Cup qualification match with Colombia against Ecuador. The following day, it was revealed that Vargas had torn a ligament in his left ankle and would initially not be able to play for three months. However, his recovery was pushed back to seven months in January 2010. He returned to action on 28 February, playing the last 5 minutes of a 2–0 win over Racing Santander.

=== AEK Athens ===
On 26 August 2011, Vargas signed with Super League Greece club AEK Athens on a 1+1 year deal keeping him at the club until 2013. Vargas scored his first goal for AEK on his second league appearance against Skoda Xanthi, making the scoreline 1–1 with a bicycle kick. AEK went on to win the match 4–3. In July 2012 Vargas agreed to have his contract terminated in order for AEK to pay off club debts.

=== Independiente ===
On 23 July 2012 Vargas signed for Independiente, where he played for a season.

=== La Equidad ===
In July 2016 Vargas moved to La Equidad on a free transfer. In his game against his former club América de Cali he played his 600th match as a professional football player.

== Honours ==
América de Cali

- Copa Mustang: 2000, 2001, 2002
- Copa Merconorte: 1999

Internacional

- FIFA Club World Cup: 2006
- Recopa Sudamericana: 2007

Boca Juniors

- Primera División Argentina: Apertura 2003, Apertura 2005, Clausura 2006, Apertura 2008
- Intercontinental Cup: 2003
- Copa Sudamericana: 2004, 2005
- Recopa Sudamericana: 2005, 2008

Colombia

- Copa América: 2001
