= Antonis Rikka =

Greek footballer (born 1986)

Personal information
- Full name: Anthony Stavros Ricca
- Date of birth: 3 March 1986 (age 40)
- Place of birth: Marseille, France
- Height: 1.79 m (5 ft 10 in)
- Position: Defensive midfielder

Youth career
- –2005: Marseille

Senior career*
| Years | Team | Apps | (Gls) |
| 2005–2006 | Marseille | 0 | (0) |
| 2006–2008 | Skoda Xanthi | 27 | (1) |
| 2006–2007 | → Niki Volos (loan) | 29 | (0) |
| 2008–2013 | AEK Athens | 31 | (0) |
| 2010–2011 | → Olympiacos Volos (loan) | 7 | (0) |
| 2011 | → Kerkyra (loan) | 2 | (0) |
| 2013–2014 | Red Star | 14 | (0) |
| 2014–2015 | Aiginiakos | 20 | (1) |
| 2015–2016 | AO Chania | 15 | (0) |
| 2017 | Ialysos | | |
| 2017–2018 | AO Symi | 15 | (5) |
| 2018–2019 | Rodos | 12 | (2) |
| 2019–2020 | AO Symi | 2 | (0) |

International career^{‡}
| 2004–2005 | Greece U19 | 13 | (0) |
| 2006–2008 | Greece U21 | 12 | (0) |
- * Club domestic league appearances and goals as of 29 May 2016 ‡ National team caps and goals as of 1 September 2008

Anthony Stavros Ricca (Greek: Αντώνης Σταύρος Ρίκκα; born 3 March 1986), most known as Antonis Rikka, is a Greek former professional footballer who played as a defensive midfielder.

== Club career ==
=== Marseille ===
Born in Marseille, France, Rikka started his career in the city's biggest club, Olympique de Marseille.

=== Skoda Xanthi ===
After not being able to establish himself at Marseille, Rikka was released and joined Skoda Xanthi on 4 February 2006, making 4 appearances until the end of the season. Then, he joined on loan Niki Volos, a Beta Ethniki team, in order to gain more experiences. He stayed with them for the 2006–07 season, participating in 29 league games. Although his team finished last and relegated, his performances were good enough to make the Skoda Xanthi coach Emilio Ferrera trust him with a place in the following year's squad. Rikka grabbed the opportunity and having played 23 league games was one of the team's best players.

=== AEK Athens ===
On 16 May 2008, Rikka signed a five-year contract for Greek Super League runners-up side AEK Athens for €600,000, but did not manage to impress AEK's trainers in his first season and managed only three appearances, due to a serious injury. After two consecutive seasons on loan, he returned to AEK.

=== Loan to Olympiacos Volos ===
On 1 June 2010, Rikka joined Olympiacos Volos on loan for one season.

=== Loan to Kerkyra ===
On 16 January 2011, Rikka joined Kerkyra on loan until the end of the season.

=== Second stint in AEK ===
In August 2011, Rikka returned to AEK Athens, but he was not at Jimenez plans. When Kostenoglou took charge in AEK, he considered his senior squad and he finally decided to keep Rikka. On 19 November, he came on as a second-half substitute against Asteras Tripolis and he made a comeback. In that whole season, Rikka made 13 appearances.

=== Red Star ===
On 4 July 2013, Rikka joined Red Star after his contract with AEK was terminated.

=== Football League (Greece) ===
In 2014, he played in the Football League for Aiginiakos and then AO Chania. In 2017 he moved to Ialysos for a while and then for AO Symi. He returned to Rhodes in to play for Rodos for a season only to finish his career at AO Symi in 2020.
