= Thomas Tsitas =

Greek footballer

Personal information
- Date of birth: 30 July 1991 (age 35)
- Place of birth: Giannitsa, Greece
- Height: 1.90 m (6 ft 3 in)
- Position: Striker

Youth career
- 2007: Athlitiki Akadimia Giannitson
- 2007–2011: Iraklis

Senior career*
Years	Team	Apps	(Gls)
2011	Iraklis	3	(0)
2011–2013	AEK Athens	9	(0)
2013–2014	Niki Volos	14	(1)
2014	Paniliakos	7	(6)
2015	Kallithea	11	(0)
2015	Anagennisi Karditsa	9	(2)
2016	PAEEK	19	(7)
2017	Enosis Neon Paralimni	11	(6)
2017–2018	Omonia Aradippou	25	(12)
2018–2019	Othellos Athienou	22	(11)
2019–2020	Olympiacos Volos	21	(5)
2020–2021	Iraklis	11	(7)
2021–2022	Asteras Tripotamos		
2022	Kampaniakos		
2022–2023	Iraklis Ampelokipi		
2023–2024	Agrotikos Asteras		
2024–2025	Ethnikos Sochos		

International career^{‡}
2009–2010	Greece U19	2	(1)
2011–2012	Greece U21	3	(0)
- * Club domestic league appearances and goals as of 17 November 2019 ‡ National team caps and goals as of 7 January 2015

Thomas Tsitas (Greek: Θωμάς Τσίτας; born 30 July 1991) is a Greek professional footballer who plays as a striker.

== Club career ==
=== Early life and career ===
Tsitas was born in Giannitsa and started his career playing for Athlitiki Akadimia Giannitson. In the summer of 2007, after his club's president offered him to Iraklis, he signed for the club and joined their under 17 squad. In his first season with Iraklis U17, the 2008–2009 season, he scored a total of 20 goals. On 29 March 2010 Tsitas went on trial to PSV Eindhoven, but as he lacked a permission from Iraklis to do so, he was forced to come back. Tsitas continued his goalscoring trends with Iraklis U20 by scoring over 20 goals per season, to force his way into the first team.

=== Iraklis ===
Tsitas signed a professional contract for Iraklis in January 2011. He debuted for Iraklis on 29 January 2011, as he came in for Karim Soltani, in the 83rd minute of a 0–0 home draw against Kerkyra.

=== AEK Athens ===
In August 2011 Tsitas signed a 3-year contract after being a free agent with his new team AEK Athens. On 4 December 2011 Tsitas made his debut for AEK Athens, in the game against Kerkyra as a substitution.

=== Niki Volos ===
In July 2013 Tsitas signed a professional contract for Greek Football League club Niki Volos.

== International career ==
Tsitas debuted for Greece U19 on 13 November 2009, in a friendly 3–3 draw against France U19. Tsitas was a 65th-minute substitute and six minutes later he even managed to score his first goal for the team. His last appearance to date for the team, was in a friendly match against Aspropyrgos. He played his first match for Greece U21 on 9 February 2011 against Germany U21.

== Personal life ==
Tsitas is a student in the department of Economics of the University of Thessaly.
