= Steve Leo Beleck =

Cameroonian footballer

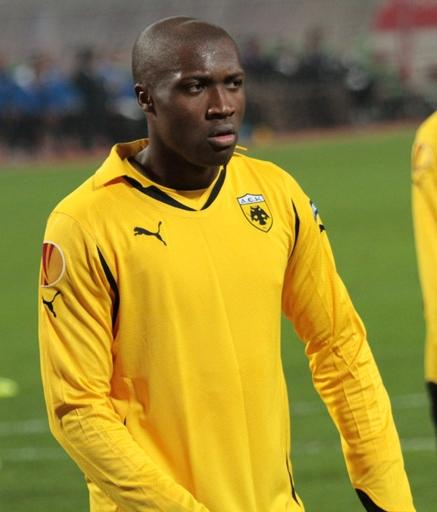
- Beleck playing for AEK Athens

Personal information
- Full name: Steve Leo Beleck A'Beka
- Date of birth: 10 February 1993 (age 33)
- Place of birth: Yaoundé, Cameroon
- Height: 1.88 m (6 ft 2 in)
- Position: Forward

Youth career
- –2009: Diósgyőri
- 2009–2010: Panthrakikos

Senior career*
Years	Team	Apps	(Gls)
2009–2010	Panthrakikos	13	(5)
2010–2014	Udinese	0	(0)
2011–2012	→ AEK Athens (loan)	27	(5)
2012–2013	→ Watford (loan)	5	(0)
2013	→ Stevenage (loan)	13	(0)
2013	→ Mons (loan)	7	(1)
2014–2017	Fiorentina	0	(0)
2014	→ Crotone (loan)	12	(1)
2015	→ Mantova (loan)	11	(2)
2015–2016	→ CFR Cluj (loan)	25	(4)
2016–2017	→ Ümraniyespor (loan)	30	(5)
2017–2019	Balıkesirspor	31	(5)
2019–2020	Rieti	18	(2)
2020	Catania	7	(0)
2020–2021	Petrolul Ploiești	4	(0)
2021–2023	Yverdon	51	(2)
- * Club domestic league appearances and goals as of 19 June 2023

Steve Leo Beleck A'Beka (born 10 February 1993) is a Cameroonian professional footballer who plays as a striker.

Beleck began his career at Greek team Panthrakikos, breaking into the first team at age 16. Following a successful second half to the 2009–10 season, Beleck joined Udinese of the Italian Serie A for an undisclosed fee, signing a five-year deal in July 2010. A year later, Beleck returned to Greece, this time joining AEK Athens on a season-long loan. He played regularly, and returned to his parent club at the end of the 2011–12 season. A month after returning to his parent club, Beleck was loaned out for a second time, joining English Championship side Watford on a one-year loan agreement. In January 2013, Beleck was re-loaned from Watford to Stevenage for the remainder of the 2012–13 season. In August 2013, Beleck was signed on a season-long loan for RAEC Mons but returned to Udinese in January 2014.

== Club career ==
=== Early career ===
Born in Yaoundé, Cameroon, Beleck joined Greek side Panthrakikos at the age of 15. He played for the club's first team in January 2010, starting in a 3–1 away defeat to Iraklis. He received a red card five minutes into the second half, and consequently missed Panthrakikos' next two matches. Beleck scored four goals in February 2010: once in a 2–1 loss to AEK Athens, twice in a 2–0 away victory against Larissa, and a further goal in a 3–1 home defeat to Kavala. He also scored on the last day of the regular season, netting from the penalty spot to briefly restore parity in an eventual 3–1 defeat to Atromitos. It turned out to be his final appearance for the club. Beleck made 13 league appearances during the season, scoring five goals, although Panthrakikos were relegated at the end of the campaign.

=== Udinese and loans ===
Beleck ultimately joined Udinese for an undisclosed fee on 22 July 2010, signing a contract until 2015.

Beleck did not make any first-team appearances during the 2010–11 season, only appearing as an unused substitute in an away game against Fiorentina in May 2011. He was subsequently loaned out to AEK Athens in July 2011, on a season-long loan, ahead of the 2011–12 campaign. He made his debut for AEK in the club's 1–0 home win over Dinamo Tbilisi on 18 August 2011, in the play-off round of Europa League qualification, playing the whole match. Beleck's first goal for the club came in a 3–1 away defeat to OFI on 23 October 2011, coming on as a half-time substitute with the team losing by two goals and scoring on the hour mark to briefly reduce the deficit. He also scored in a 3–2 defeat to rivals Panathinaikos at the Olympic Stadium in November 2011. Later that month, Beleck was on hand to score twice in a 2–0 away win against Panetolikos, as well as scoring the only goal of the game a week later in the 1–0 defeat of Kerkyra. He took his goal tally to six for the season when he scored the winning goal as AEK progressed to the Fifth Round of the Greek Cup courtesy of a 1–0 win over Kalamata on 22 December 2011. Despite his strong end to 2011, Beleck did not score during the second half of the season. He made 34 appearances in all competitions, scoring six times, helping AEK Athens secure a fifth-place finish in the Greek Super League.

Following the completion of his one-year loan agreement at AEK, Beleck briefly returned to Udinese before subsequently joining English Championship side Watford in July 2012, on a season-long loan for the 2012–13 season. Beleck was one of ten players loaned to Watford from Udinese. He made his first starting appearance for the club in a home defeat against Bradford City in the second round of the League Cup on 28 August 2012, having also made an injury-time substitute in a league match against Ipswich Town a week earlier.

In January 2013, having only made six first-team appearances for Watford during the first half of the season, Beleck joined League One side Stevenage on loan for the remainder of the 2012–13 season. The move caused a great deal of curiosity, as Beleck was on loan at Watford from Udinese at the time of his move from Watford to Stevenage. It was revealed that international loans are recognised as regular transfers, meaning the player can be re-loaned as long as the deal stretches between two transfer windows. Beleck had scored a hat-trick against Stevenage a month prior to his move, in a behind-closed-doors friendly match. He made his first appearance for Stevenage a day after signing, coming on as a 61st-minute substitute in the club's 2–1 away victory at Crewe Alexandra. Beleck returned to Udinese at the end of the season, having made 13 appearances during his time on loan at Stevenage.

In August 2013, Beleck again left Udinese on loan, moving to Belgian side R.A.E.C. Mons.

=== Rieti ===
On 2 September 2019, he returned to Italy, signing with Serie C club Rieti. His contract with Rieti was terminated by mutual consent on 31 January 2020.

=== Catania ===
On 7 February 2020, Beleck joined Serie C club Catania until the end of the 2019–20 season.

=== Petrolul Ploiești ===
On 23 October 2020 he joined Petrolul Ploiești.

=== Yverdon ===
On 8 July 2021, he signed with Yverdon in Switzerland.

== International career ==
Beleck has represented Cameroon at both the U17 and U20 levels.

== Honours ==
=== Club ===
CFR Cluj

- Cupa României: 2015–16
