= Aleksandre Koshkadze =

Georgian footballer

Personal information
- Date of birth: 4 December 1981 (age 44)
- Place of birth: Georgian SSR
- Height: 1.71 m (5 ft 7 in)
- Position: Midfielder

Senior career*
Years	Team	Apps	(Gls)
2002–2004	Sioni Bolnisi	5	(0)
2004–2005	Torpedo Kutaisi	32	(5)
2005–2006	Ameri Tbilisi	25	(2)
2006	Dinamo Batumi	10	(0)
2006–2007	Borjomi	11	(1)
2007–2008	Olimpi Rustavi	12	(2)
2008	Meskheti Akhaltsikhe	12	(2)
2008	Sioni Bolnisi	14	(5)
2008–2012	Dinamo Tbilisi	110	(23)
2012–2013	Baia Zugdidi	18	(1)
2013	Dinamo Batumi	10	(1)
2013–2014	Guria Lanchkhuti	21	(4)
2014	Dila Gori	12	(0)
2014–2015	Guria Lanchkhuti	26	(4)
2015	Kolkheti-1913 Poti	11	(1)
2016	Sapovnela Terjola	2	(0)
2016	Imereti Khoni	13	(1)
2017–2018	Sioni Bolnisi	63	(10)
2019–2020	Telavi	30	(12)

International career
2003	Georgia U21	1	(0)
2010	Georgia	3	(0)
- * Club domestic league appearances and goals as of 31 December 2020

Aleksandre Koshkadze (born 4 December 1981) is a Georgian football player as a midfielder.

== Honours ==
- Georgian Cup: 2009
