= 2011–12 Panathinaikos F.C. season =

Panathinaikos
2011–12 season
- Chairman: Dimitris Gontikas
- Manager: Jesualdo Ferreira
- Ground: Athens Olympic Stadium
- Super League Greece: 2nd
- Greek Cup: Round of 16
- Champions League: Third qualifying round
- Europa League: Play-off round
- Top goalscorer: League: Sebastian Leto (15); All: Sebastian Leto (16)
- Highest home attendance: 42,130 vs Olympiacos (18 March 2012)
- Lowest home attendance: 2,414 vs Atromitos (2 May 2012)
- Average home league attendance: 12,154
| Home colours | Away colours | Third colours |

The 2011–12 season was Panathinaikos's 53rd consecutive season in Super League Greece.

They also competed in the Greek Cup and were eliminated from the UEFA Champions League and the UEFA Europa League.

== Players ==
=== First-team squad ===
Squad at end of season

Note: Flags indicate national team as defined under FIFA eligibility rules; some limited exceptions apply. Players may hold more than one non-FIFA nationality.

| No. | Pos. | Nation | Player |
|---|---|---|---|
| 2 | DF | GRE | Giourkas Seitaridis |
| 3 | DF | ESP | Josu Sarriegi (Captain) |
| 4 | DF | FRA | Jean-Alain Boumsong |
| 5 | DF | MLI | Cédric Kanté |
| 6 | MF | ESP | Vitolo |
| 7 | MF | GRE | Sotiris Ninis |
| 8 | DF | GRE | Giorgos Ioannidis |
| 9 | FW | ESP | Toché |
| 10 | MF | GRE | Lazaros Christodoulopoulos |
| 11 | FW | ARG | Sebastián Leto (3rd Captain) |
| 14 | FW | GHA | Quincy Owusu-Abeyie |
| 17 | MF | GRE | Zeca |
| 18 | DF | SWE | Mattias Bjärsmyr |
| 19 | MF | FRA | Damien Plessis |
| 22 | DF | GRE | Stergos Marinos |

| No. | Pos. | Nation | Player |
|---|---|---|---|
| 23 | MF | MOZ | Simão Mate Junior |
| 24 | DF | GRE | Loukas Vyntra (4th Captain) |
| 25 | GK | GRE | Stefanos Kotsolis |
| 26 | MF | GRE | Giorgos Karagounis |
| 27 | GK | GRE | Orestis Karnezis |
| 28 | FW | GRE | Antonis Petropoulos |
| 29 | MF | GRE | Kostas Katsouranis (2nd Captain) |
| 31 | DF | GRE | Nikos Spyropoulos |
| 33 | GK | GRE | Alexandros Tabakis |
| 34 | MF | GRE | Spyros Fourlanos |
| 35 | DF | GRE | Charis Mavrias |
| 38 | FW | BRA | Cleyton |
| 40 | GK | GRE | Stefanos Kapino |
| 44 | DF | GRE | Anastasios Lagos |
| 71 | FW | HUN | Gergely Rudolf (on loan from Genoa) |

== Transfers ==
=== In ===
| Date | Pos. | Name | From | Fee |
|---|---|---|---|---|
| 19 July 2011 | MF | Vitolo | PAOK FC | Free |
| 19 July 2011 | FW | Toché | FC Cartagena | Free |
| 20 July 2011 | MF | Quincy Owusu-Abeyie | Al-Sadd | Loan |
| 29 July 2011 | MF | Zeca | Vitória Setúbal | €300.000 |
| 31 August 2011 | FW | Gergely Rudolf | Genoa | Loan |

=== Out ===
| Date | Pos. | Name | To | Fee |
|---|---|---|---|---|
| 24 May 2011 | MF | Gilberto Silva | Gremio | Free |
| 16 June 2011 | MF | Gabriel | Gremio | Free |
| 5 July 2011 | FW | Sidney Govou | Evian Thonon Gaillard FC | Free |
| 1 July 2011 | MF | Luis García Sanz | Puebla FC | Free |
| 5 July 2011 | MF | Marcelo Mattos | Botafogo | €1.000.000 |
| 12 July 2011 | FW | Djibril Cissé | SS Lazio | €6.000.000 |
| 25 August 2011 | DF | Bryce Moon | SuperSport United F.C. | Free |
| 26 August 2011 | GK | Alexandros Tzorvas | Palermo | €900.000 |
| 26 August 2011 | MF | Elini Dimoutsos | Atromitos | Free |

== Pre-season and friendlies ==
| Date | Opponents | H / A | Result F – A | Scorers | Attendance |
|---|---|---|---|---|---|
| 11 July 2011 | Lech Poznan | N | 1 – 0 | Moon 86' | |
| 13 July 2011 | Kitzbühel | N | 11 – 0 | Katsouranis 1', Petropoulos 14',26', Leto 39', Ninis 44', Marinos 66',89', Moon 68', Leontiou 76', Karagounis 79' (pen), Cleyton 85' | |
| 15 July 2011 | Sivasspor | N | 0 – 0 | | |
| 17 July 2011 | Köln | N | 1 – 2 | Leto 19' (pen) – Podolski 17', Pezzoni 81' | |
| 21 July 2011 | Atromitos Athinon | Peristeri | 0 – 0 | | |
| 24 September 2011 | Kallithea | Kallithea | 2 – 0 | Vyntra 40', Cleyton 55' | 1500 |
| 1 October 2011 | Iraklis Psachna | Psachna | 3 – 1 | Cleyton 24', 36', Quincy 43' – Liosis 50' | 4000 |

== Competitions ==
=== Super League Greece ===
==== Regular season ====
===== League table =====
| Pos | Team | Pld | W | D | L | GF | GA | GD | Pts | Qualification or relegation |
|---|---|---|---|---|---|---|---|---|---|---|
| 1 | Olympiacos (C) | 30 | 23 | 4 | 3 | 70 | 17 | +53 | 73 | Qualification for the Champions League group stage |
| 2 | Panathinaikos (Note: Panathinaikos was docked three points following severe crowd violence during a match against Olympiacos and lost the game 0–3.) | 30 | 22 | 3 | 5 | 54 | 23 | +31 | 66 | Qualification for the Play-offs |
| 3 | PAOK | 30 | 14 | 8 | 8 | 45 | 27 | +18 | 50 (Note: Head-to-head points: PAOK 4, Atromitos 1.) | Qualification for the Play-offs |
| 4 | Atromitos | 30 | 13 | 11 | 6 | 32 | 26 | +6 | 50 | Qualification for the Play-offs |
| 5 | AEK Athens | 30 | 13 | 9 | 8 | 36 | 30 | +6 | 48 | Qualification for the Play-offs |

Source: Super League Greece
Rules for classification: 1) Points, 2) Head-to-head points, 3) Head-to-head goal difference.
If in current league table there are tied teams after applying criteria 1 to 3, they are considered to share places and listed in Greek language alphabetic order.
If in final league table there are still tied teams after applying criteria 1 to 3, a decision match (or matches if they are more than two) are to be played but only in three cases: to determine the champion, to fill spots in the play-off or to determine the teams to be relegated. In any other case, the final standings of tied teams are determined with a public draw
(C) Champions

===== Matches =====
| 28 August 2011 1 | Kerkyra | 0–2 | Panathinaikos | Kerkyra |
| 19:15 | Osman (yellow card) 62'; Metin (yellow card) 74' | Summary | Karagounis (yellow card) 40'; Leto 62' (pen.); Vyntra (yellow card) 85'; Ninis 90+2' | Stadium: Kerkyra Stadium; Attendance: 1,690; Referee: Anastasios Sidiropoulos |

| 11 September 2011 2 | Panathinaikos | 3–1 | PAS Giannina | Athens |
| 20:30 | Josu Sarriegi 7'; Katsouranis (yellow card) 31'; Toché 44'; Karagounis (yellow card) 74'; Leto 75' | Summary | De Vincenti (yellow card) 38'; Pantos (yellow card) 49'; Bakayoko 68' | Stadium: Olympic Stadium; Attendance: 14,026; Referee: Georgios Daskalopoulos |

| 17 September 2011 3 | Atromitos | 1–1 | Panathinaikos | Athens |
| 19:30 | Mpalas (yellow card) 41'; Mitroglou 53'; Mitroglou (yellow card) 54'; Skondras (yellow card) 64'; Giannoulis (yellow card) 65'; Dimoutsos (yellow card) 90' | Summary | Karnezis (red card) 3'; Rudolf (yellow card) 60'; Leto (yellow card) 65'; Josu Sarriegi (yellow card) 71'; Leto 86'; Zeca (yellow card) 89' | Stadium: Peristeri Stadium; Attendance: 3,240; Referee: Athanasios Giachos |

| 16 October 2011 6 | Skoda Xanthi | 2–3 | Panathinaikos | Xanthi |
| 16:00 | Viviani (yellow card) 20'; Stathakis (yellow card) 40'; Souanis (yellow card) 46'; Edimar Fraga 66'; Vlachodimos 68'; Edimar Fraga (yellow card) 84'; Poy (yellow card) 90' | Summary | Spyropoulos (yellow card) 15'; Leto 21' (pen.), 23'; Vitolo (yellow card) 32' (yellow-red card) 39'; Quincy 56'; Kapino (yellow card) 90' | Stadium: Skoda Xanthi Arena; Attendance: 2,584; Referee: Andreas Pappas |

| 22 October 2011 7 | Panathinaikos | 4–0 | Ergotelis | Athens |
| 19:30 | Boumsong 7'; Josu Sarriegi (yellow card) 9'; Leto 25', 57' (pen.); Katsouranis 32'; Katsouranis (yellow card) 36' | Summary | Oliseh (yellow card) 31'; Hieblinger (yellow card) 45'; Jovanović (yellow card) 76' | Stadium: Olympic Stadium; Attendance: 13,012; Referee: Christos Mitsios |

| 30 October 2011 8 | PAOK | 1–3 | Panathinaikos | Thessaloniki |
| 19:30 | Etto (yellow card) 59'; Vieirinha 85' (pen.); Fotakis (yellow card) 90' | Summary | Cleyton 33'; Zeca (yellow card) 51'; Quincy 56'; Leto 69'; Simão (yellow card) 84' | Stadium: Toumba Stadium; Attendance: 19,002; Referee: Michael Koukoulakis |

| 6 November 2011 9 | Panathinaikos | 3–2 | AEK Athens | Athens |
| 19:30 | Leto 16', 30'; Simão (yellow card) 27'; Katsouranis 53'; Boumsong (yellow card) 69' | Summary | Karabelas (yellow card) 35'; Juan Cala (yellow card) 49'; Beleck 61'; Kafes (yellow card) 68'; Liberopoulos (yellow card) 82'; Leonardo 89'; Vargas (yellow card) 90+2'; Arabatzis (yellow card) 90+6' | Stadium: Olympic Stadium; Attendance: 32,929; Referee: Ilias Spathas |

| 19 November 2011 10 | Olympiacos | 1–1 | Panathinaikos | Piraeus |
| 19:30 | David Fuster (yellow card) 28'; Djebbour 47'; Papadopoulos (yellow card) 51'; Djebbour (yellow card) 81'; Mirallas (yellow card) 88' | Summary | Zeca 16'; Marinos (yellow card) 20'; Spyropoulos (yellow card) 33'; Leto (yellow card) 71'; Katsouranis (yellow card) 85'; Karagounis (yellow card) 90'; Kapino (yellow card) 90+3' | Stadium: Karaiskakis Stadium; Attendance: 31,553; Referee: Athanasios Giachos |

| 27 November 2011 11 | Panathinaikos | 3–1 | OFI | Athens |
| 17:15 | Zeca 14'; Cleyton 46'; Kapino (yellow card) 58'; Leto (yellow card) 63'; Leto 75' (pen.) | Summary | Kalajdzic 58' (pen.) | Stadium: Olympic Stadium; Attendance: 24,979; Referee: Praxiteles Zachariadis |

| 4 December 2011 12 | Aris | 3–1 | Panathinaikos | Thessaloniki |
| 19:30 | Cesarec 11'; Sankaré (yellow card) 20'; Dickoh 44'; Dickoh (yellow card) 45'; Neto 48'; Faty (yellow card) 88' | Summary | Katsouranis (yellow card) 18'; Leto (yellow card) 21'; Boumsong 38'; Vyntra (yellow card) 55'; Rudolf (yellow card) 90' | Stadium: Kleanthis Vikelidis Stadium; Attendance: 8,954; Referee: Ilias Spathas |

| 11 December 2011 13 | Panionios | 1–2 | Panathinaikos | Athens |
| 17:15 | Schembri 8'; Schembri (yellow card) 39'; Kvirkvelia (yellow card) 61'; Kumordzi (yellow card) 62' | Summary | Leto 62' (pen.); Katsouranis 74'; Rudolf (yellow card) 80'; Zeca (yellow card) 90+1' | Stadium: Panionios Stadium; Attendance: 3,074; Referee: Peter Constantine |

| 17 December 2011 14 | Panathinaikos | 3–1 | Asteras Tripolis | Athens |
| 19:30 | Leto 8', 79'; Katsouranis (yellow card) 31'; Leto (yellow card) 64'; Boumsong 66'; Marinos 73'; Simão (yellow card) 87' | Summary | Jacobo (yellow card) 8'; Tsambouris (yellow card) 65'; Juli (yellow card) 82'; Usero 83' | Stadium: Olympic Stadium; Attendance: 15,385; Referee: Anastasios Sidiropoulos |

| 4 January 2012 15 | Panetolikos | 1–1 | Panathinaikos | Agrinio |
| 17:15 | Karamalikis (yellow card) 21'; Camara 63'; Kousas (yellow card) 73' | Summary | Kanté (yellow card) 28'; Karagounis (yellow card) 33'; Petropoulos (yellow card) 70'; Simão (yellow card) 90'; Toché 90+4' | Stadium: Panetolikos Stadium; Attendance: 6,008; Referee: Mihail Voskakis |

| 8 January 2012 16 | Panathinaikos | 1–0 | Kerkyra | Athens |
| 17:15 | Leto 24'; Vitolo (yellow card) 76' | Summary | Grammozis (yellow card) 71'; Majstorovic (yellow card) 77' | Stadium: Olympic Stadium; Attendance: 9,216; Referee: Dimitrios Thanos |

| 15 January 2012 17 | PAS Giannina | 0–1 | Panathinaikos | Ioannina |
| 20:10 | Pantos (yellow card) 27'; De Vincenti (yellow card) 66' | Summary | Cleyton (yellow card) 12'; Leto (yellow card) 20'; Spyropoulos (yellow card) 20'; Simão (yellow card) 31'; Cleyton 85' | Stadium: Zosimades Stadium; Attendance: 4,309; Referee: Ilias Spathas |

| 18 January 2012 4 | Panathinaikos | 1–0 | Doxa Drama | Athens |
| 19:30 | Katsouranis (yellow card) 23'; Cleyton (yellow card) 61'; Vitolo (yellow card) 77'; Katsouranis 88' | Summary | Vertzos (yellow card) 39'; Psycogios (yellow card) 44'; Brilakis (yellow card) 51'; Šeremet (yellow card) 85'; Tripotseris (yellow card) 90' | Stadium: Olympic Stadium; Attendance: 4,863; Referee: Christos Mitsios |

| 22 January 2012 18 | Panathinaikos | 1–0 | Atromitos | Athens |
| 19:30 | Simão (yellow card) 40'; Quincy 73'; Josu Sarriegi (yellow card) 84' | Summary | Mitroglou (yellow card) 39'; Pitu Garcia (yellow card) 81'; Anastasakos (yellow card) 90' | Stadium: Olympic Stadium; Attendance: 15,445; Referee: Andreas Pappas |

| 25 January 2012 5 | Panathinaikos | 3–0 | Levadiakos | Athens |
| 19:30 | Sarriegi 33'; Toché 58' 63'; Spyropoulos (yellow card) 69' | Summary | Machairas (yellow card) 43'; Viana (yellow card) 49'; Ioannou (yellow card) 57' | Stadium: Olympic Stadium; Attendance: 7,522; Referee: Michael Koukoulakis |

| 29 January 2012 19 | Doxa Drama | 0–1 | Panathinaikos | Thessaloniki |
| 17:15 | Tripotseris (yellow card) 82' | Summary | Toché 58' | Stadium: Kaftanzoglio Stadium; Attendance: 1,654; Referee: Georgios Daskalopoulos |

| 4 February 2012 20 | Levadiakos | 1–0 | Panathinaikos | Livadeia |
| 19:30 | Alexiou (yellow card) 32'; Favalli (yellow card) 45+3'; Melissas 83' (yellow card) 84'; Korbos (yellow card) 86'; Kyriakidis (yellow card) 90+3'; Koutsopoulos (yellow card) 90+4' | Summary | Zeca (yellow card) 16'; Vitolo (yellow card) 34'; Christodoulopoulos (yellow card) 82' | Stadium: Levadia Municipal Stadium; Attendance: 1,897; Referee: Georgios Kominis |

| 12 February 2012 21 | Panathinaikos | 3–0 | Skoda Xanthi | Athens |
| 19:30 | Cleyton (yellow card) 55'; Christodoulopoulos (yellow card) 76'; Toché 78'; Karagounis 89' (yellow card) 90'; Petropoulos 90+2' | Summary | Mandalos (yellow card) 26'; Marcelinho (yellow card) 68'; Stasiak (yellow card) 88' | Stadium: Olympic Stadium; Attendance: 5,930; Referee: Alexandros Aretopoulos |

| 18 February 2012 22 | Ergotelis | 0–2 | Panathinaikos | Heraklion |
| 17:15 | Beto (yellow card) 33' | Summary | Simão (yellow card) 33' (goal) 55'; Mavrias 59'; Vitolo (yellow card) 64' | Stadium: Pankritio Stadium; Attendance: 3,954; Referee: Anastasios Kakos |

| 4 March 2012 23 | Panathinaikos | 0–2 | PAOK | Athens |
| 19:30 | Vitolo (yellow card) 43'; Sarriegi (yellow card) 51'; Bjärsmyr (yellow card) 54'; Katsouranis (yellow card) 71' | Summary | Nimani (yellow card) 38'; Lino 51' (pen.); Fotakis (yellow card) 71'; Salpingidis 83'; Malezas (yellow card) 90+2'; Pablo García (yellow card) 90+2' | Stadium: Olympic Stadium; Attendance: Closed to fans Referee: Michalis Voskakis |

| 11 March 2012 24 | AEK Athens | 2–0 | Panathinaikos | Athens |
| 19:30 | Karabelas (yellow card) 23'; Georgeas (yellow card) 43'; Leonardo 48' (yellow card) 49'; Klonaridis 71' (yellow card) 72'; Manolas (yellow card) 90' | Summary | Katsouranis (yellow card) 11'; Marinos (yellow card) 37'; Simão (yellow card) 84' | Stadium: Olympic Stadium; Attendance: TBA; Referee: Michael Koukoulakis |

| 18 March 2012 25 | Panathinaikos | 0–1 | Olympiacos | Athens |
| 19:30 | Katsouranis (yellow card) 25' | Summary | Abdoun 51'; Kazım (yellow card) 56'; Modesto (yellow card) 70'; Maniatis (yellow card) 78' | Stadium: Olympic Stadium; Attendance: 42,130; Referee: Anastasios Kakos |
Note: Match interrupted in the 82nd minute due to fan riot. Olympiacos were later awarded a 0–3 w.o win by the F.A.

| 24 March 2012 26 | OFI | 0–1 | Panathinaikos | Heraklion |
| 19:30 | Verón (yellow card) 63'; Papoulis (yellow card) 63'; Vandinho (yellow card) 65' | Summary | Cleyton 17'; Vyntra (yellow card) 49'; Lagos (yellow card) 75'; Karnezis (yellow card) 90+4' | Stadium: Theodoros Vardinogiannis Stadium; Attendance: 2,996; Referee: Stavros Tritsonis |

| 1 April 2012 27 | Panathinaikos | 1–0 | Aris | Athens |
| 19:00 | Spyropoulos (yellow card) 58' (yellow-red card) 59'; Simão (yellow card) 67'; Rudolf 81' | Summary | Kasnaferis (yellow card) 19'; Sankaré (yellow card) 72' | Stadium: Olympic Stadium; Attendance: Closed to fans Referee: Anastasios Sidiropoulos |

| 8 April 2012 28 | Panathinaikos | 3–0 | Panionios | Athens |
| 19:00 | Christodoulopoulos 47'; Rudolf (yellow card) 65'; Vyntra (yellow card) 68'; Katsouranis (yellow card) 81'; Simão (yellow card) 83'; Petropoulos 84' 88' | Summary | Samaris (yellow card) 64'; Kurdi (yellow card) 81' | Stadium: Olympic Stadium; Attendance: Closed to fans Referee: Athanasios Giachos |

| 18 April 2012 29 | Asteras Tripolis | 0–2 | Panathinaikos | Tripoli |
| 19:00 | Francou (yellow card) 40' | Summary | Cleyton 58' (yellow card) 59'; Marinos (yellow card) 60'; Vitolo (yellow card) 72'; Christodoulopoulos (yellow card) 81' (goal) 90+3' | Stadium: Gipedo Astera Tripolis; Attendance: 1,816; Referee: Georgios Kominis |

| 22 April 2012 30 | Panathinaikos | 4–0 | Panetolikos | Athens |
| 19:00 | Quincy 18'; Toché 52' 82'; Christodoulopoulos 84' | Summary | Ricardo Fernandes (yellow card) 27'; Doležaj (yellow card) 60' | Stadium: Olympic Stadium; Attendance: Closed to fans Referee: Georgios Daskalopoulos |

==== Play-offs ====
===== League table =====
| Pos | Team | Pld | W | D | L | GF | GA | GD | Pts | Qualification |
|---|---|---|---|---|---|---|---|---|---|---|
| 2 | Panathinaikos | 6 | 3 | 1 | 2 | 5 | 4 | +1 | 14 | Qualification for the Champions League third qualifying round |
| 3 | AEK Athens | 6 | 3 | 0 | 3 | 7 | 5 | +2 | 9 | Ineligible for the 2012–13 European competitions. (Note: AEK Athens were not licensed to play in the Europa League 2012–2013 and therefore were replaced by the 6th placed team in the league table, Asteras Tripolis, qualified for the second qualifying round. This meant that PAOK were qualified for the third qualifying round of the Europa League and Atromitos to the Europa League play-offs.) |
| 4 | Atromitos | 6 | 2 | 2 | 2 | 6 | 6 | 0 | 8 | Qualification for the Europa League play-off round (Note: Atromitos lost the final of the 2011–12 Greek Football Cup against Champions League-qualified team Olympiacos. As a consequence, the three Europa League spots were distributed by the final standings of this group.) |
| 5 | PAOK | 6 | 2 | 1 | 3 | 3 | 6 | −3 | 7 | Qualification for the Europa League third qualifying round |

Source: Super League Greece: Standings and Schedule
Rules for classification: Rules for classification: 1) points; 2) head-to-head points; 3) head-to-head goal difference; 4) classification of regular season.

===== Matches =====
| 2 May 2012 1 | Panathinaikos | 1–1 | Atromitos | Athens |
| 17:45 | Toché 55'; Katsouranis (yellow card) 59'; Zeca (yellow card) 80' | Summary | Pitu Garcia 4'; Ikonomou (yellow card) 32'; Itandje (yellow card) 83'; Epstein (yellow card) 84'; Sfakianakis (yellow card) 90'; Iglesias (yellow card) 90' | Stadium: Olympic Stadium; Attendance: 2,414; Referee: Michael Koukoulakis |

| 7 May 2012 2 | AEK Athens | 2–0 | Panathinaikos | Athens |
| 20:00 | Bougaidis (yellow card) 25'; Makos 29'; Kafes (yellow card) 62'; Klonaridis 80'; Manolas (yellow card) 90' | Summary | Toché (yellow card) 12'; Simão (yellow card) 45' | Stadium: Olympic Stadium; Attendance: 6,018; Referee: Anastasios Sidiropoulos |

| 10 May 2012 3 | PAOK | 1–0 | Panathinaikos | Thessaloniki |
| 20:00 | Salpingidis 32'; Lazăr (yellow card) 58'; Pablo García (yellow card) 62'; Ivić (yellow card) 76'; Chalkias (yellow card) 79'; Cirillo (yellow card) 86' | Summary | Katsouranis (yellow card) 30' | Stadium: Toumba Stadium; Attendance: 11,484; Referee: Stavros Tritsonis |

| 13 May 2012 4 | Panathinaikos | 2–0 | PAOK | Athens |
| 19:15 | Sarriegi (yellow card) 53'; Toché 62'; Simão (yellow card) 70'; Cleyton 86' | Summary | Ivić (yellow card) 72' | Stadium: Olympic Stadium; Attendance: 3,012; Referee: Athanasios Giachos |

| 16 May 2012 5 | Atromitos | 0–1 | Panathinaikos | Athens |
| 17:45 | Karamanos (yellow card) 52'; Iglesias (yellow card) 62'; Sfakianakis (yellow card) 67' | Summary | Katsouranis (yellow card) 20'; Vitolo (yellow card) 40'; Ninis 65' (yellow card) 66' | Stadium: Peristeri Stadium; Attendance: 1,518; Referee: Stavros Tritsonis |

| 20 May 2012 6 | Panathinaikos | 1–0 | AEK Athens | Athens |
| 20:00 | Toché 62'; Quincy (yellow card) 65'; Mavrias (yellow card) 72'; Kanté (yellow card) 82' | Summary | Lagos (yellow card) 48'; Fountas (yellow card) 64' | Stadium: Olympic Stadium; Attendance: 11,260; Referee: Anastasios Kakos |

=== Greek Cup ===
==== Fourth round ====
| 20 December 2011 | Agrotikos Asteras | 0–1 | Panathinaikos | Thessaloniki |
| 14:00 | Samouilidis (yellow card) 2'; Adjeman-Pamboe (yellow card) 6'; Aspridis (yellow card) 81' | Summary | Vyntra 22'; Mavrias (yellow card) 38'; Rudolf (yellow card) 69'; Ioannidis (yellow card) 79'; Vitolo (yellow card) 82' | Stadium: Agrotikos Asteras Ground, Evosmos; Attendance: ~1700; Referee: Giannis Delfakis |

==== Fifth round ====
| 11 January 2012 | Panionios | 0–0 (a.e.t.) (4–3 p) | Panathinaikos | Athens |
| 21:00 | Schembri (yellow card) 21'; Rovas (yellow card) 65'; Samaris (yellow card) 119' | Summary | Toché (yellow card) 40'; Spyropoulos (yellow card) 83'; Zeca (yellow card) 86'; Leto (yellow card) 105'; Katsouranis (yellow card) 113' | Stadium: Nea Smyrni Stadium; Attendance: ? Referee: Tasos Kakos (Corfu) |
| | Penalties |
| | Samaris (penalty missed); Cocalić (penalty scored); Schembri (penalty missed); Goundoulakis (penalty scored); Siovas (penalty scored); Omo (penalty scored) | | (penalty missed) Karagounis; (penalty scored) Quincy; (penalty scored) Rudolf; (penalty scored) Katsouranis; (penalty missed) Leto; (penalty missed) Bjärsmyr |

=== UEFA Champions League ===
==== Qualifying phase ====
===== Third qualifying round =====
| 27 July 2011 First leg | Odense (Denmark) | 1–1 | (Greece) Panathinaikos | Odense, Denmark |
| 21:00 (20:00 local) | Sørensen (yellow card) 41'; Djemba-Djemba (yellow card) 79'; Reginiussen 90' | Summary | Leto 47'; Spyropoulos (yellow card) 87' | Stadium: TRE-FOR Park; Attendance: 10,055; Referee: Carlos Clos Gómez (Spain) |

| 2 August 2011 Second leg | Panathinaikos (Greece) | 3–4 (4–5 agg.) | (Denmark) Odense | Athens, Greece |
| 21:45 | Boumsong 35'; Toché 50'; Katsouranis (yellow card) 54'; Petropoulos 90+5' | Summary | Johansson 12'; Ruud (yellow card) 21'; Mendy (yellow card) 24'; Ruud 58'; Wessels (yellow card) 76'; Kadrii 80'; Kadrii (yellow card) 81'; Andreasen 88'; Mendy (yellow card) 90+3' (red card) | Stadium: Olympic Stadium; Attendance: 25,460; Referee: Andre Marriner (England) |

=== UEFA Europa League ===
==== Play-off round ====
| 18 August 2011 First leg | Maccabi Tel Aviv (Israel) | 3–0 | (Greece) Panathinaikos | Tel Aviv, Israel |
| 20:30 | Konaté 60'; Atar 67' (pen.) 90' | Summary | Toché (yellow card) 57'; Simão (yellow card) 68' | Stadium: Bloomfield Stadium; Attendance: 12,500; Referee: Eric Braamhaar (Netherlands) |

| 25 August 2011 Second leg | Panathinaikos (Greece) | 2–1 (2–4 agg.) | (Israel) Maccabi Tel Aviv | Athens, Greece |
| 21:15 | Leto (yellow card) 33'; Boumsong 70'; Cleyton (yellow card) 71'; Toché 79' | Summary | Dahan (yellow card) 2'; Lugasi (yellow card) 9'; Haimov (yellow card) 33'; Nivaldo (yellow card) 35'; Medunjanin 61'; Konaté (red card) 72' | Stadium: Olympic Stadium; Attendance: 15,503; Referee: Antonio Damato (Italy) |

== Top goalscorers ==
16 goals

- Sebastián Leto (15 in Greek League, 1 in Champions League)

13 goals

- Toché (11 in Greek League, 1 in Champions League, 1 in Europa League)

6 goals

- Cleyton (6 in Greek League)

5 goals

- Jean-Alain Boumsong (3 in Greek League,1 in Champions League, 1 in Europa League)

4 goals

- Kostas Katsouranis (4 in Greek League)
- Antonis Petropoulos (3 in Greek League, 1 in Champions League)
- Quincy Owusu-Abeyie (4 in Greek League)

3 goals

- Lazaros Christodoulopoulos (3 in Greek League)

2 goals

- Sotiris Ninis (2 in Greek League)
- Josu Sarriegi (2 in Greek League)
- Zeca (2 in Greek League)

1 goal

- Giorgos Karagounis (1 in Greek League)
- Charis Mavrias (1 in Greek League)
- Gergely Rudolf (1 in Greek League)
- Simão (1 in Greek League)
- Loukas Vyntra (1 in Greek Cup)
