= 2009–10 Panathinaikos F.C. season =

Panathinaikos
2009–10 season
- Chairman: Nikos Pateras
- Manager: Nikos Nioplias
- Ground: Athens Olympic Stadium
- Super League Greece: 1st (champions)
- Greek Cup: Winners
- Europa League: Round of 16
- Top goalscorer: League: Djibril Cissé (23); All: Djibril Cissé (29)
- Highest home attendance: 61,135 vs Olympiacos (21 March 2010)
- Lowest home attendance: 5,058 vs Kallithea (3 February 2010)
- Average home league attendance: 29,226
Home colours	Away colours	Third colours

The 2009–10 season was Panathinaikos' 51st consecutive season in Super League Greece. The 2009–10 season was very successful for Panathinaikos. At the summer transfer window the club bought Djibril Cissé from Marseille, Kostas Katsouranis from Benfica, Sebastian Leto from Liverpool and various other players spending more than €35 million. The team managed to enter the final 16 of Europa League and win the Greek Championship. Panathinaikos completed the domestic double by winning the Greek Cup final.

== Players ==
=== First-team squad ===
Squad at end of season

Note: Flags indicate national team as defined under FIFA eligibility rules; some limited exceptions apply. Players may hold more than one non-FIFA nationality.

No.	Pos.	Nation	Player
1	GK	CRO	Mario Galinović (vice-captain)
2	DF	RSA	Bryce Moon
3	DF	ESP	Josu Sarriegi
4	MF	BRA	Marcelo Mattos
5	FW	CRO	Ante Rukavina
6	DF	GRE	Christos Melissis
7	MF	GRE	Sotiris Ninis
8	DF	MLI	Cédric Kanté
9	FW	FRA	Djibril Cissé
10	FW	BRA	Cleyton
11	MF	ARG	Sebastián Leto
14	FW	GRE	Dimitris Salpingidis (vice-captain)
15	MF	BRA	Gilberto Silva (vice-captain)
17	MF	GRE	Lazaros Christodoulopoulos
18	DF	SWE	Mattias Bjärsmyr
19	DF	BRA	Gabriel

No.	Pos.	Nation	Player
20	MF	GRE	Sotiris Leontiou
21	DF	GRE	Filipos Darlas
22	DF	GRE	Stergos Marinos
23	MF	MOZ	Simão
24	DF	GRE	Loukas Vintra
25	DF	GRE	Giourkas Seitaridis
26	MF	GRE	Giorgos Karagounis (captain)
27	GK	GRE	Orestis Karnezis
28	FW	GRE	Antonis Petropoulos
29	MF	GRE	Kostas Katsouranis (vice-captain)
30	GK	GRE	Alexandros Tzorvas
31	DF	GRE	Nikos Spiropoulos
32	DF	BRA	David
34	DF	GER	Giorgos Machlelis
39	MF	GRE	Elini Dimoutsos

== Squad changes for 2009–10 ==
=== In ===
Note: Flags indicate national team as defined under FIFA eligibility rules; some limited exceptions apply. Players may hold more than one non-FIFA nationality.

No.	Pos.	Nation	Player
8	DF	MLI	Cédric Kanté (From Nice) on a free transfer
9	FW	FRA	Djibril Cissé (From Olympique de Marseille) for €8 million
11	MF	ARG	Sebastián Leto (From Liverpool) for €4 million
18	DF	SWE	Mattias Bjärsmyr (From IFK Göteborg) for €0.45 million
22	DF	GRE	Stergos Marinos (From Atromitos) for €0.2 million
25	DF	GRE	Giourkas Seitaridis (from Atlético Madrid) on a free transfer
29	MF	GRE	Kostas Katsouranis (From Benfica) for €3 million

total spending : €15,650,000 ▼

=== Out ===
Note: Flags indicate national team as defined under FIFA eligibility rules; some limited exceptions apply. Players may hold more than one non-FIFA nationality.

No.	Pos.	Nation	Player
—	DF	SWE	Mikael Nilsson (to Brøndby) on a free transfer
—	DF	POL	Jakub Wawrzyniak (loan return to Legia Warsaw)
—	DF	GRE	Giannis Goumas (retired)
—	GK	POL	Arkadiusz Malarz (to AEL) on a free transfer
—	DF	GRE	Stefanos Siontis (to Kavala) on a free transfer

=== Out on loan ===
Note: Flags indicate national team as defined under FIFA eligibility rules; some limited exceptions apply. Players may hold more than one non-FIFA nationality.

No.	Pos.	Nation	Player
33	DF	RSA	Nasief Morris (on loan to Racing de Santander)
10	MF	AUT	Andreas Ivanschitz (on loan to Mainz)
32	DF	BRA	David (on loan to Flamengo)
20	MF	GRE	Sotiris Leontiou (on loan to Kavala)
4	MF	BRA	Marcelo Mattos (on loan to Corinthians)
6	DF	GRE	Christos Melissis (on loan to AEL)
2	DF	RSA	Bryce Moon (on loan to PAOK)
16	FW	GRE	Vangelis Mantzios (on loan to Anorthosis)

== Club ==
=== Management ===
Position	Staff
Manager	(Greece) Nikos Nioplias
Assistant manager	(Poland) (Greece) Krzysztof Warzycha
Assistant manager	(Greece) Michalis Iordanidis
Physical fitness coach	(Greece) Stergios Fotopoulos
Goalkeeping coach	(Greece) Vasilis Alexoudis
Team manager	(Greece) Grigoris Papavasiliou
Team doctor	(Greece) Panagiotis Kouloumentas

== Competitions ==
=== Super League Greece ===
==== Regular season ====
===== League table =====
Pos	Team	Pld	W	D	L	GF	GA	GD	Pts	Qualification or relegation
1	Panathinaikos (C)	30	22	4	4	54	17	+37	70	Qualification for the Champions League group stage
2	Olympiacos	30	19	7	4	47	18	+29	64	Qualification for the Play-offs
3	PAOK	30	19	5	6	41	16	+25	62	Qualification for the Play-offs
4	AEK Athens	30	15	8	7	43	31	+12	53	Qualification for the Play-offs
5	Aris	30	12	10	8	35	28	+7	46	Qualification for the Play-offs

Source: Super League Greece
Rules for classification: 1) Points; 2) Head-to-head points; 3) Head-to-head goal difference; 4) Play-offs (neutral ground).
(Note: Criterion 4 is only used if needed to decide champion, teams for relegation or teams for UEFA competitions).
(C) Champions

===== Matches =====
22 August 2009 1	Ergotelis	0–3	Panathinaikos	Heraklion
19:00		Report	Cissé 9'; Leto 40', 90+3'	Stadium: Pankritio Stadium; Attendance: 6,481; Referee: Vassilios Paboridis

30 August 2009 2	Panathinaikos	1–0	Skoda Xanthi	Athens
19:00	Katsouranis 40'	Report		Stadium: Olympic Stadium; Attendance: 28,068; Referee: Georgios Stathopoulos

13 September 2009 3	Panthrakikos	0–1	Panathinaikos	Komotini
19:00		Report	Leto 79'	Stadium: Komotini Municipal Stadium; Attendance: 5,335; Referee: Dimitrios Kalopoulos

20 September 2009 4	Panathinaikos	2–1	Aris	Athens
19:00	Abreu 42' (o.g.); Katsouranis 83'	Report	Guiaro 36'	Stadium: Olympic Stadium; Attendance: 27,125; Referee: Michail Dakos

27 September 2009 5	AEK Athens	0–1	Panathinaikos	Athens
21:15		Report	Salpingidis 48'	Stadium: Olympic Stadium; Attendance: 22,423; Referee: Michael Koukoulakis

5 October 2009 6	Panathinaikos	4–0	AEL	Athens
21:15	Vyntra 45+1'; Katsouranis 66'; Cissé 69', 87'	Report		Stadium: Olympic Stadium; Attendance: 23,539; Referee: Nathaniel Charalambidis

18 October 2009 7	Kavala	2–2	Panathinaikos	Kavala
19:00	Onwuachi 21', 43'	Report	Katsouranis 56'; Cissé 90+4'	Stadium: Anthi Karagianni Stadium; Attendance: 6,203; Referee: Andreas Pappas

25 October 2009 8	Panathinaikos	2–1	PAOK	Athens
19:00	Katsouranis 23', 70'	Report	Vieirinha 39'	Stadium: Olympic Stadium; Attendance: 19,875; Referee: Ilias Spathas

1 November 2009 9	Panathinaikos	2–1	Panionios	Athens
19:00	Cissé 9' (pen.), 11'	Report	Riera 53'	Stadium: Olympic Stadium; Attendance: 18,066; Referee: Konstantinos Papastamatis

8 November 2009 10	Levadiakos	0–2	Panathinaikos	Livadeia
19:00		Report	Karakostas 67' (o.g.); Cissé 81'	Stadium: Levadia Municipal Stadium; Attendance: 3,095; Referee: Stavros Tritsonis

22 November 2009 11	Panathinaikos	1–1	Asteras Tripolis	Athens
16:45	Cissé 74'	Report	Udoji 61'	Stadium: Olympic Stadium; Attendance: 32,192; Referee: Apostolos Abarkiolis

29 November 2009 12	Olympiacos	2–0	Panathinaikos	Piraeus
19:30	Mitroglou 45+1', 54'	Report		Stadium: Karaiskakis Stadium; Attendance: 31,059; Referee: Anastasios Kakos

6 December 2009 13	Panathinaikos	3–1	Atromitos	Athens
16:45	Katsouranis 6', 33'; Cissé 90+1'	Report	Melissas 45+1'	Stadium: Olympic Stadium; Attendance: 9,759; Referee: Dimitris Kyrkos

12 December 2009 14	Iraklis	0–1	Panathinaikos	Thessaloniki
19:00		Report	Ninis 73'	Stadium: Kaftanzoglio Stadium; Attendance: 6,455; Referee: Ilias Spathas

19 December 2009 15	Panathinaikos	4–0	PAS Giannina	Athens
19:00	Cissé 50' (pen.), 75'; Vyntra 80'; Christodoulopoulos 89'	Report		Stadium: Olympic Stadium; Attendance: 16,145; Referee: Nathaniel Charalambidis

6 January 2010 16	Panathinaikos	4–1	Ergotelis	Athens
16:45	Cissé 26', 66'; Karagounis 44'; Leto 90+2'	Report	Fragoulakis 8'	Stadium: Olympic Stadium; Attendance: 30,031; Referee: Michalis Tsiniaris

9 January 2010 17	Skoda Xanthi	1–2	Panathinaikos	Xanthi
16:45	Souanis 89'	Report	Cissé 26', 88'	Stadium: Skoda Xanthi Arena; Attendance: 3,143; Referee: Anastasios Kakos

17 January 2010 18	Panathinaikos	2–0	Panthrakikos	Athens
16:45	Karagounis 26'; Salpingidis 40'	Report		Stadium: Olympic Stadium; Attendance: 16,087; Referee: Mihail Voskakis

24 January 2010 19	Aris	0–0	Panathinaikos	Thessaloniki
16:45		Report		Stadium: Kleanthis Vikelidis Stadium; Attendance: 17,802; Referee: Ilias Spathas

31 January 2010 20	Panathinaikos	1–1	AEK Athens	Athens
19:00	Salpingidis 27'	Report	Scocco 9'	Stadium: Olympic Stadium; Attendance: 47,379; Referee: Giorgos Stathopoulos

7 February 2010 21	AEL	0–3	Panathinaikos	Larissa
19:00		Report	Cissé 45', 45+1'; Ninis 82'	Stadium: Alcazar Stadium; Attendance: 4,363; Referee: Georgios Daloukas

14 February 2010 22	Panathinaikos	0–2	Kavala	Athens
16:45		Report	Smolarek 68', 85'	Stadium: Olympic Stadium; Attendance: 19,653; Referee: Michalis Tsiniaris

21 February 2010 23	PAOK	2–1	Panathinaikos	Thessaloniki
19:00	García 59'; Muslimović 68'	Report	Cissé 64'	Stadium: Toumba Stadium; Attendance: 23,104; Referee: Giorgos Daloukas

28 February 2010 24	Panionios	0–2	Panathinaikos	Athens
19:00		Report	Cisse 21' (pen.), 55'	Stadium: Nea Smyrni Stadium; Attendance: 5,607; Referee: Dimitrios Kalopoulos

7 March 2010 25	Panathinaikos	3–0	Levadiakos	Athens
16:45	Salpingidis 64'; Leto 71'; Cissé 74'	Report		Stadium: Olympic Stadium; Attendance: 14,162; Referee: Mihail Voskakis

14 March 2010 26	Asteras Tripolis	0–1	Panathinaikos	Tripoli
16:45		Report	Vyntra 72'	Stadium: Asteras Tripolis Stadium; Attendance: 2,997; Referee: Stavros Tritsonis

21 March 2010 27	Panathinaikos	0–1	Olympiacos	Athens
19:00		Report	Derbyshire 67'	Stadium: Olympic Stadium; Attendance: 61,135; Referee: Georgios Daloukas

28 March 2010 28	Atromitos	0–3	Panathinaikos	Peristeri
19:00		Report	Salpingidis 18'; Cissé 74' (pen.); Leto 89'	Stadium: Peristeri Stadium; Attendance: 3,535; Referee: Anastasios Kakos

11 April 2010 29	Panathinaikos	2–0	Iraklis	Athens
19:00	Cissé 1'; Ninis 45'	Report		Stadium: Olympic Stadium; Attendance: 49,747; Referee: Michalis Tsiniaris

18 April 2010 30	PAS Giannina	0–1	Panathinaikos	Ioannina
19:00		Report	Gabriel 56'	Stadium: Zosimades Stadium; Attendance: 4,466; Referee: Marios Labropoulos

=== Greek Cup ===
==== Fourth round ====
28 October 2009	Eordaikos	0–3	Panathinaikos	Ptolemaida
17:00		Report	Rukavina 3', 26'; Ninis 75'	Stadium: National Stadium of Ptolemaida; Referee: Apostolos Ambarkiolis (Thessaloniki)

==== Fifth round ====
13 January 2010	Panathinaikos	2–1	Pierikos	Athens
17:00	Cleyton 14', 90'	Report	Konteon 40'	Stadium: Olympic Stadium; Attendance: 6,159; Referee: Athanasios Giachos (Chios)

==== Quarter-finals ====
3 February 2010	Panathinaikos	2–0	Kallithea	Athens
17:00	Salpingidis 52'; Arkoudas 88' (o.g.)	Report		Stadium: Olympic Stadium; Attendance: 5,058; Referee: Christos Mitsios (Epirus)

==== Semi-finals ====
24 March 2010 First leg	Panathinaikos	3–1	PAS Giannina	Athens
17:00	Kotsios 14' (o.g.); Ninis 45'; Cissé 85'	Report	Kousas 90'	Stadium: Olympic Stadium; Attendance: 6,695; Referee: Giorgos Stathopoulos (Achaea)

7 April 2010 Second leg	PAS Giannina	0–0 (1–3 agg.)	Panathinaikos	Ioannina
17:00 EET		Report		Stadium: Zosimades Stadium; Attendance: 5,566; Referee: Stavros Tritsonis (Athens)

==== Final ====
24 April 2010	Panathinaikos	1–0	Aris	Athens
20:30	Leto 63'	Report		Stadium: Olympic Stadium; Attendance: 48,926; Referee: Anastasios Kakos (Corfu)

=== UEFA Champions League ===
==== Qualifying phase ====
===== Third qualifying round =====
28 July 2009 First leg	Sparta Prague (Czech Republic)	3–1	(Greece) Panathinaikos	Prague, Czech Republic
20:00	Holenda 26'; Vacek 32'; Kalouda 86'	Report	Salpingidis 67'	Stadium: AXA Arena; Attendance: 12,058; Referee: Ivan Bebek (Croatia)

4 August 2009 Second leg	Panathinaikos (Greece)	3–0 (4–3 agg.)	(Czech Republic) Sparta Prague	Athens, Greece
20:45	Sarriegi 45'; Katsouranis 54'; Salpingidis 89'	Report		Stadium: Olympic Stadium; Attendance: 50,000; Referee: Pedro Proença (Portugal)

===== Play-off round =====
19 August 2009 First leg	Panathinaikos (Greece)	2–3	(Spain) Atlético Madrid	Athens, Greece
20:45	Salpingidis 47'; Leto 74'	Report	Rodríguez 36'; Forlán 63'; Agüero 70'	Stadium: Olympic Stadium; Attendance: 50,540; Referee: Felix Brych (Germany)

25 August 2009 Second leg	Atlético Madrid (Spain)	2–0 (5–2 agg.)	(Greece) Panathinaikos	Madrid, Spain
20:45	Vyntra 4' (o.g.); Agüero 83'	Report		Stadium: Vicente Calderón Stadium; Attendance: 29,910; Referee: Pieter Vink (Netherlands)

=== UEFA Europa League ===
==== Group F ====
Pos	Team	Pld	W	D	L	GF	GA	GD	Pts	Qualification
1	(Turkey) Galatasaray	6	4	1	1	12	4	+8	13	Advance to knockout phase
2	(Greece) Panathinaikos	6	4	0	2	7	4	+3	12	Advance to knockout phase
3	(Romania) Dinamo București	6	2	0	4	4	12	−8	6	
4	(Austria) Sturm Graz	6	1	1	4	3	6	−3	4	

Source: Soccerway

17 September 2009 1	Panathinaikos (Greece)	1–3	(Turkey) Galatasaray	Athens, Greece
19:00	Salpingidis 78'	Report	Elano 5'; Baroš 48'; Sarriegi 58' (o.g.)	Stadium: Olympic Stadium; Attendance: 46,791; Referee: Paolo Tagliavento (Italy)

1 October 2009 2	Dinamo București (Romania)	0–1	(Greece) Panathinaikos	Bucharest, Romania
21:05		Report	Karagounis 79'	Stadium: Stadionul Dinamo; Attendance: 0 Referee: César Muñiz Fernández (Spain)
Note: Two home matches which Dinamo București had to play behind closed doors because one fan entered the playing field and other fans invaded the running track around the pitch in the play-off round against Slovan Liberec.

22 October 2009 3	Panathinaikos (Greece)	1–0	(Austria) Sturm Graz	Athens, Greece
21:05	Salpingidis 60' (pen.)	Report		Stadium: Olympic Stadium; Attendance: 31,127; Referee: Peter Rasmussen (Denmark)

5 November 2009 4	Sturm Graz (Austria)	0–1	(Greece) Panathinaikos	Graz, Austria
19:00		Report	Katsouranis 70'	Stadium: UPC-Arena; Attendance: 15,322; Referee: Pavel Královec (Czech Republic)

3 December 2009 5	Galatasaray (Turkey)	1–0	(Greece) Panathinaikos	Istanbul, Turkey
21:05	Gilberto 50' (o.g.)	Report		Stadium: Ali Sami Yen Stadium; Attendance: 18,566; Referee: Ivan Bebek (Croatia)

16 December 2009 6	Panathinaikos (Greece)	3–0	(Romania) Dinamo București	Athens, Greece
19:00	Rukavina 54'; Cissé 80', 85'	Report		Stadium: Olympic Stadium; Attendance: 19,617; Referee: Kevin Blom (Netherlands)

==== Knockout stage ====
===== Round of 32 =====
18 February 2010 First leg	Panathinaikos (Greece)	3–2	(Italy) Roma	Athens, Greece
21:05	Salpingidis 67'; Christodoulopoulos 84'; Cissé 89'	Report	Vučinić 29'; Pizarro 81' (pen.)	Stadium: Olympic Stadium; Attendance: 54,274; Referee: Damir Skomina (Slovenia)

25 February 2010 Second leg	Roma (Italy)	2–3 (4–6 agg.)	(Greece) Panathinaikos	Rome, Italy
19:00	Riise 11'; De Rossi 67'	Report	Cissé 40' (pen.), 45+1'; Ninis 43'	Stadium: Stadio Olimpico; Attendance: 47,825; Referee: Bruno Paixão (Portugal)

===== Round of 16 =====
11 March 2010 First leg	Panathinaikos (Greece)	1–3	(Belgium) Standard Liège	Athens, Greece
21:05	Vyntra 48'	Report	Witsel 8'; Jovanović 16'; De Camargo 74'	Stadium: Olympic Stadium; Attendance: 50,782; Referee: Craig Thomson (Scotland)

18 March 2010 Second leg	Standard Liège (Belgium)	1–0 (4–1 agg.)	(Greece) Panathinaikos	Liège, Belgium
19:00	Mbokani 45+2'	Report		Stadium: Stade Maurice Dufrasne; Attendance: 29,000; Referee: Gianluca Rocchi (Italy)
