= 2010–11 Panathinaikos F.C. season =

Panathinaikos
2010–11 season
- Chairman: Dimitris Gontikas
- Manager: Jesualdo Ferreira
- Ground: Athens Olympic Stadium
- Super League Greece: 2nd
- Greek Cup: Quarter-finals
- Champions League: Group stage
- Top goalscorer: League: Djibril Cissé (20); All: Djibril Cissé (26)
- Highest home attendance: 58,466 vs Barcelona (24 November 2010)
- Lowest home attendance: 4,754 vs Olympiacos Volos (15 May 2011)
- Average home league attendance: 19,941
Home colours	Away colours	Third colours

The 2010–11 season was Panathinaikos' 52nd consecutive season in Super League Greece.

They also competed in the Greek Cup and the UEFA Champions League

== Players ==
=== First-team squad ===
Squad at end of season

Note: Flags indicate national team as defined under FIFA eligibility rules; some limited exceptions apply. Players may hold more than one non-FIFA nationality.

No.	Pos.	Nation	Player
1	GK	CRO	Mario Galinović
2	DF	GRE	Giourkas Seitaridis
3	DF	ESP	Josu Sarriegi
4	DF	FRA	Jean-Alain Boumsong
5	DF	MLI	Cédric Kanté
7	MF	GRE	Sotiris Ninis
8	DF	GRE	Georgios Ioannidis
9	FW	FRA	Djibril Cissé (Vice-captain)
10	MF	FRA	Sidney Govou
11	FW	ARG	Sebastián Leto
14	MF	ESP	Luis García
15	MF	BRA	Gilberto Silva (Vice-captain)
17	DF	BRA	Gabriel
18	DF	SWE	Mattias Bjärsmyr
19	MF	FRA	Damien Plessis
20	MF	GRE	Lazaros Christodoulopoulos

No.	Pos.	Nation	Player
21	MF	GRE	Elini Dimoutsos
22	DF	GRE	Stergos Marinos
23	MF	MOZ	Simão Mate
24	DF	GRE	Loukas Vyntra
25	GK	GRE	Stefanos Kotsolis
26	MF	GRE	Giorgos Karagounis (captain)
27	GK	GRE	Orestis Karnezis
28	FW	GRE	Antonis Petropoulos
29	MF	GRE	Kostas Katsouranis (Vice-captain)
30	GK	GRE	Alexandros Tzorvas
31	DF	GRE	Nikos Spyropoulos
35	DF	GRE	Charis Mavrias
38	MF	BRA	Cleyton
40	GK	GRE	Stefanos Kapino
44	DF	GRE	Tasos Lagos
66	GK	POR	Daniel Fernandes

== Transfers ==
=== In ===
Note: Flags indicate national team as defined under FIFA eligibility rules; some limited exceptions apply. Players may hold more than one non-FIFA nationality.

No.	Pos.	Nation	Player
8	MF	GRE	Georgios Ioannidis (from Iraklis)
4	DF	FRA	Jean-Alain Boumsong (from Lyon for €500,000)
10	FW	FRA	Sidney Govou (from Lyon – Free transfer)
66	GK	POR	Daniel Fernandes (on loan from VfL Bochum)
14	MF	ESP	Luis García (from Racing Santander – Free transfer)
19	MF	FRA	Damien Plessis (from Liverpool – Free transfer)

=== Out ===
Note: Flags indicate national team as defined under FIFA eligibility rules; some limited exceptions apply. Players may hold more than one non-FIFA nationality.

No.	Pos.	Nation	Player
9	FW	GRE	Dimitris Salpingidis (to PAOK)
31	DF	GRE	Filippos Darlas (to Brest)
5	FW	CRO	Ante Rukavina (to Dinamo Zagreb for €800,000)
55	DF	RSA	Nasief Morris (to Apollon Limassol, previously on loan to Racing Santander)
32	DF	BRA	David Braz (to Flamengo for €360,000 – Co-ownership)

=== Out on loan ===
Note: Flags indicate national team as defined under FIFA eligibility rules; some limited exceptions apply. Players may hold more than one non-FIFA nationality.

No.	Pos.	Nation	Player
—	MF	GRE	Sotiris Leontiou (on loan to Ilioupoli)
—	DF	GRE	Christos Melissis (on loan to AEL Larissa)
—	FW	GRE	Evangelos Mantzios (on loan to Marítimo)

== Competitions ==
=== Super League Greece ===
==== Regular season ====
===== League table =====
Pos	Team	Pld	W	D	L	GF	GA	GD	Pts	Qualification or relegation
1	Olympiacos (C)	30	24	1	5	65	18	+47	73	Qualification for the Champions League group stage
2	Panathinaikos	30	18	6	6	47	26	+21	60	Qualification for the Play-offs
3	AEK Athens	30	15	5	10	46	37	+9	50	Qualification for the Play-offs
4	PAOK	30	14	6	10	32	29	+3	48	Qualification for the Play-offs
5	Olympiacos Volos (Note: On 28 July 2011, the Disciplinary Committee of the competition found Olympiacos Volos and Kavala guilty of match-fixing. Therefore the clubs were automatically put at the end of the league table and demoted to the Football League. The decision, however, was lifted on 10 August 2011 after both appealed. Instead of that Olympiacos Volos had 10 points deducted and Kavala 8 for the 2011-2012 season. On 23 August 2011, the Professional Sports Committee stripped Kavala and Olympiacos Volos of their professional licence, due to their chairmen's involvement in the match fixing scandal.) (D)	30	12	11	7	40	28	+12	47	Play-offs and relegation to the Delta Ethniki

Source: Super League Greece
Rules for classification: 1) Points; 2) Head-to-head points; 3) Head-to-head goal difference; 4) Play-offs (neutral ground); 7) Draw.
(Note: Criterion 4 is only used if needed to decide champion, teams for relegation or teams for UEFA competitions).
(C) Champions; (D) Disqualified

===== Matches =====
27 August 2010 1	Panathinaikos	1–1	Skoda Xanthi	Athens
21:00	Petropoulos 9'	Report	Ellington 51'	Stadium: Leoforos Alexandras Stadium; Attendance: Closed to fans Referee: A. Sidiropoulos (Dodecanese Prefecture)

11 September 2010 2	Aris	0–1	Panathinaikos	Thessaloniki
21:00		Report	Cissé 43' (pen.)	Stadium: Kleanthis Vikelidis Stadium; Attendance: 12,708; Referee: G. Daloukas (Thessaly Prefecture)

18 September 2010 3	Kavala	2–2	Panathinaikos	Kavala
19:30	Douglão 30'; Darcheville 33'	Report	Cissé 12', 79'	Stadium: Kavala Stadium; Attendance: 3,905; Referee: Tasos Kakos (Corfu)

25 September 2010 4	Panathinaikos	2–1	Panionios	Athens
19:30	Ninis 44'; Katsouranis 63'; Ninis (red card) 90'	Report	Kumordzi 90+3'	Stadium: Olympic Stadium; Attendance: 33,112; Referee: Ch. Mitsios (Epirus (region))

3 October 2010 5	Ergotelis	1–4	Panathinaikos	Heraklion
18:15	Budimir 55'	Report	Spiropoulos 35'; Cissé 39', 44'; Katsouranis 78'	Stadium: Pankritio Stadium; Attendance: 6,209; Referee: Dimitrios Kalopoulos (Thessaloniki)

16 October 2010 6	Panathinaikos	1–0	PAOK	Athens
19:30	Vyntra 20'	Report		Stadium: Olympic Stadium; Attendance: Closed to fans Referee: Stavros Tritsonis (Athens)

24 October 2010 7	AEK Athens	1–0	Panathinaikos	Athens
21:00	Djebbour 4'	Report		Stadium: Olympic Stadium; Attendance: 27,957; Referee: Tasos Sidiropoulos (Dodecanese)

30 October 2010 8	Panathinaikos	2–1	Olympiacos	Athens
19:30	Cissé 57', 63' (pen.)	Report	Mirallas 37'; Avr. Papadopoulos (red card) 62'	Stadium: Olympic Stadium; Attendance: 52,300; Referee: Tasos Kakos (Corfu)

8 November 2010 9	Atromitos	0–1	Panathinaikos	Athens
19:30		Report	Christodoulopoulos 70'	Stadium: Peristeri Stadium; Attendance: 4,842; Referee: Ilias Spathas (Piraeus)

13 November 2010 10	Panathinaikos	1–1	AEL Larissa	Athens
19:30	Cissé 22'	Report	Cousin 7'	Stadium: Olympic Stadium; Attendance: 19,632; Referee: Dimitris Thanos (Grevena)

20 November 2010 11	Panathinaikos	4–2	Iraklis	Athens
19:30	García 30'; Cissé 45', 50'; Petropoulos 75'	Report	Mara 20'; Pitu 21'; Soltani (red card) 90+2'	Stadium: Olympic Stadium; Attendance: 20,154; Referee: Michalis Voskakis (Rethymno)

28 November 2010 12	Kerkyra	0–2	Panathinaikos	Kerkyra
19:30		Report	Cissé 79' (pen.), 90+3'	Stadium: Kerkyra Stadium; Attendance: 1,441; Referee: Vasilis Pamporidis (Kilkis)

4 December 2010 13	Panathinaikos	2–0	Panserraikos	Athens
19:30	Boumsong 16'; Cissé 69'	Report		Stadium: Olympic Stadium; Attendance: 20,752; Referee: Stavros Mantalos (Athens)

12 December 2010 14	Asteras Tripolis	0–0	Panathinaikos	Tripoli
19:30		Report		Stadium: Asteras Tripolis Stadium; Attendance: 3,947; Referee: Tasos Kakos (Corfu)

18 December 2010 15	Panathinaikos	0–1	Olympiacos Volos	Athens
19:30		Report	Monje 78'	Stadium: Olympic Stadium; Attendance: 12,872; Referee: Stavros Tritsonis (Athens)

4 January 2011 16	Skoda Xanthi	0–2	Panathinaikos	Xanthi
17:15		Report	Cissé 1'; Christodoulopoulos 90+3'	Stadium: Skoda Xanthi Arena; Attendance: 1,886; Referee: Dimitrios Kalopoulos (Thessaloniki)

8 January 2011 17	Panathinaikos	1–0	Aris	Athens
19:30	Ninis 19'	Report		Stadium: Olympic Stadium; Attendance: Closed to fans Referee: Giorgos Stathopoulos (Achaea)

16 January 2011 18	Panathinaikos	4–2	Kavala	Athens
19:30	Katsouranis 12'; Cissé 31', 64' (pen.); Christodoulopoulos 83'	Report	Abdoun 3', 43' (pen.)	Stadium: Olympic Stadium; Attendance: Closed to fans Referee: Ch. Mitsios (Epirus (region))

23 January 2011 19	Panionios	1–1	Panathinaikos	Athens
19:30	Mitroglou 49'	Report	Cissé 55' (pen.)	Stadium: Nea Smyrni Stadium; Attendance: 3,908; Referee: Tasos Kakos (Corfu)

29 January 2011 20	Panathinaikos	2–0	Ergotelis	Athens
19:30	Gilberto 7'; Kanté 39'	Report		Stadium: Olympic Stadium; Attendance: 7,316; Referee: Dimitris Thanos (Grevena)

6 February 2011 21	PAOK	0–1	Panathinaikos	Thessaloniki
19:30	Contreras (red card) 75'	Report	Ninis 10'; Spiropoulos (red card) 44'	Stadium: Toumba Stadium; Attendance: 22,008; Referee: Stavros Tritsonis (Athens)

13 February 2011 22	Panathinaikos	3–1	AEK Athens	Athens
19:30	Katsouranis 44'; Vyntra 51'; Cissé 75'	Report	Scocco 58'	Stadium: Olympic Stadium; Attendance: 37,258; Referee: Vassilis Pamporidis (Kilkis)

19 February 2011 23	Olympiacos	2–1	Panathinaikos	Piraeus
19:30	Mirallas 20'; Djebbour 90+1'; Torosidis (red card) 90+5'	Report	Leto 58'	Stadium: Karaiskakis Stadium; Attendance: 30,845; Referee: Dimitrios Kalopoulos (Thessaloniki)

26 February 2011 24	Panathinaikos	1–1	Atromitos	Athens
19:30	Govou 33'	Report	Brito 31'	Stadium: Olympic Stadium; Attendance: 30,274; Referee: Michalis Tsiniaris (Athens)

6 March 2011 25	AEL Larissa	2–0	Panathinaikos	Larissa
17:15	Pancrate 22'; Tshibamba 27'	Report		Stadium: AEL FC Arena; Attendance: 6,235; Referee: Vassilis Pamporidis (Kilkis)

12 March 2011 26	Iraklis	1–3	Panathinaikos	Thessaloniki
19:30	Mahop 36'	Report	Petropoulos 4', 51'; Christodoulopoulos 83'	Stadium: Kaftanzoglio Stadium; Attendance: 7,714; Referee: Stavros Tritsonis (Athens)

20 March 2011 27	Panathinaikos	2–1	Kerkyra	Athens
19:00	Christodoulopoulos 34'; Cissé 39'	Report	Stoltidis 45'	Stadium: Olympic Stadium; Attendance: 8,413; Referee: Nathanail Charalambidis (Kavala)

3 April 2011 28	Panserraikos	1–0	Panathinaikos	Serres
19:00	Georgiadis 44'	Report		Stadium: Serres Municipal Stadium; Attendance: 2,269; Referee: Apostolos Ambarkiolis (Thessaloniki)

10 April 2011 29	Panathinaikos	1–0	Asteras Tripolis	Athens
19:00	Pipinis 82' (o.g.)	Report	Arrache (red card) 80'	Stadium: Olympic Stadium; Attendance: 7,034; Referee: Dimitris Thanos (Athens)

17 April 2011 30	Olympiacos Volos	3–2	Panathinaikos	Volos
19:00	Martín 24' (pen.), 85'; Breška 54'	Report	Katsouranis 56'; Cissé 66'; Kanté (red card) 42'; Boumsong (red card) 78'	Stadium: Panthessaliko Stadium; Attendance: TBA; Referee: Stavros Mantalos (Athens)

==== Play-offs ====
===== League table =====
Pos	Team	Pld	W	D	L	GF	GA	GD	Pts	Qualification
2	Panathinaikos	6	3	1	2	9	5	+4	13	Qualification for the Champions League third qualifying round
3	PAOK	6	4	0	2	11	8	+3	12	Qualification for the Europa League third qualifying round
4	AEK Athens	6	2	1	3	6	6	0	8	Qualification for the Europa League play-off round (Note: AEK Athens have won the 2010–11 Greek Football Cup and are therefore qualified for the playoff round of the 2011–12 UEFA Europa League. As a consequence, the fourth-placed team of this group also entered the Europa League.)
5	Olympiacos Volos	6	2	0	4	5	12	−7	6	Qualification for the Europa League second qualifying round

Source: Super League Greece: Standings and Schedule
Rules for classification: 1) points; 2) head-to-head points; 3) head-to-head goal difference; 4) head-to-head goals scored; 5) goal difference; 6) number of goals scored.

===== Matches =====
8 May 2011 1	PAOK	2–1	Panathinaikos	Thessaloniki
19:30	Athanasiadis 57'; El Zhar 75'	Report	Cissé 79'	Stadium: Toumba Stadium; Attendance: 19,391; Referee: A. Sidiropoulos (Dodecanese Prefecture)

12 May 2011 2	Panathinaikos	1–1	AEK Athens	Athens
21:45	Blanco 24' (o.g.)	Report	Leonardo 2'	Stadium: Olympic Stadium; Attendance: 8,831; Referee: Michalis Tsiniaris (Athens)

15 May 2011 3	Olympiacos Volos	2–1	Panathinaikos	Volos
20:30	Solakis 52'; Martín 64'	Report	Leto 33'	Stadium: Panthessaliko Stadium; Attendance: 2,521; Referee: Michalis Koukoulakis (Heraklion)

18 May 2011 4	Panathinaikos	3–0	Olympiacos Volos	Athens
17:15	García 27'; Cissé 57'; Katsouranis 84', (red card) 90'	Report	Solakis (red card) 90+1'	Stadium: Olympic Stadium; Attendance: 4,754; Referee: Ch. Mitsios (Epirus (region))

22 May 2011 5	Panathinaikos	1–0	PAOK	Athens
20:30	Gilberto 74'	Report		Stadium: Olympic Stadium (Athens); Attendance: 19,824; Referee: Tasos Kakos (Corfu)

25 May 2011 6	AEK Athens	0–2	Panathinaikos	Athens
20:30		Report	Cissé 58', 67'	Stadium: Olympic Stadium; Attendance: Closed to fans Referee: Stavros Tritsonis (Athens)

=== Greek Cup ===
==== Fourth round ====
27 October 2010	Kozani	0–5	Panathinaikos	Kozani
17:00			Cissé 6'; Govou 42'; Sarriegi 70'; Christodoulopoulos 74', 77' (pen.)	Stadium: Kozani Municipal Stadium; Attendance: 1000? Referee: Michalis Voskakis (Rethymno)

==== Fifth round ====
22 December 2010	Panathinaikos	3–2	Trikala	Athens
20:00	Ninis 44'; Leto 45'; Vyntra 68'		Kontogoulidis 45+2'; Korbos 70'	Stadium: Olympic Stadium; Attendance: Closed to fans Referee: Nathanail Haralambidis (Kavala)

==== Quarter-finals ====
19 January 2011 First leg	Panathinaikos	0–2	AEK Athens	Athens
21:00			Liberopoulos 65', 80'	Stadium: Olympic Stadium; Attendance: 37,290; Referee: Dimitrios Kalopoulos (Thessaloniki)

2 February 2011 Second leg	AEK Athens	2–3 (4–3 agg.)	Panathinaikos	Athens
21:00	Lagos 13'; Míchel 90+8'		Cissé 21'; Gilberto 45'; Vyntra 63', (red card) 73'	Stadium: Olympic Stadium; Attendance: 12,411; Referee: Andreas Pappas (Athens)

=== UEFA Champions League ===
==== Group D ====
Pos	Team	Pld	W	D	L	GF	GA	GD	Pts	Qualification
1	(Spain) Barcelona	6	4	2	0	14	3	+11	14	Advance to knockout phase
2	(Denmark) Copenhagen	6	3	1	2	7	5	+2	10	Advance to knockout phase
3	(Russia) Rubin Kazan	6	1	3	2	2	4	−2	6	Transfer to Europa League
4	(Greece) Panathinaikos	6	0	2	4	2	13	−11	2	

Source: Soccerway

14 September 2010 1	Barcelona (Spain)	5–1	(Greece) Panathinaikos	Barcelona, Spain
21:45 (20:45 local)	Messi 22', 45'; Villa 33'; Pedro 78'; Alves 90+3'	Report	Govou 20'	Stadium: Camp Nou; Attendance: 69,738; Referee: Nicola Rizzoli (Italy)

29 September 2010 2	Panathinaikos (Greece)	0–2	(Denmark) Copenhagen	Athens, Greece
21:45	Gilberto (red card) 48'	Report	N'Doye 28'; Vingaard 37'	Stadium: Olympic Stadium; Attendance: 43,607; Referee: William Collum (Scotland)

20 October 2010 3	Panathinaikos (Greece)	0–0	(Russia) Rubin Kazan	Athens, Greece
21:45		Report		Stadium: Olympic Stadium; Attendance: 36,748; Referee: Manuel Gräfe (Germany)

2 November 2010 4	Rubin Kazan (Russia)	0–0	(Greece) Panathinaikos	Kazan, Russia
19:30 (20:30 local)		Report		Stadium: Tsentralnyi Stadion; Attendance: 16,400; Referee: Tony Chapron (France)

24 November 2010 5	Panathinaikos (Greece)	0–3	(Spain) Barcelona	Athens, Greece
21:45		Report	Pedro 27', 69'; Messi 62'	Stadium: Olympic Stadium; Attendance: 58,466; Referee: Gianluca Rocchi (Italy)

7 December 2010 6	Copenhagen (Denmark)	3–1	(Greece) Panathinaikos	Copenhagen, Denmark
21:45 (20:45 local)	Vingaard 26'; Grønkjær 50' (pen.); Cissé 73' (o.g.)	Report	Kanté 90+2'	Stadium: Parken Stadium; Attendance: 36,797; Referee: Florian Meyer (Germany)

== Top goalscorers ==
Including matches played on 25 May 2011; Source: Soccerway

26 goals

- (France) Djibril Cissé (20 in Super League, 4 in play-offs, 2 in Greek Cup)

7 goals

- (Greece) Lazaros Christodoulopoulos (5 in Super League, 2 in Greek Cup)

6 goals

- (Greece) Kostas Katsouranis (5 in Super League, 1 in play-offs)

4 goals

- (Greece) Sotiris Ninis (3 in Super League, 1 in Greek Cup)
- (Greece) Antonis Petropoulos (4 in Super League)
- (Greece) Loukas Vyntra (2 in Super League, 2 in Greek Cup)

3 goals

- (Brazil) Gilberto Silva (1 in Super League, 1 in play-offs, 1 in Greek Cup)
- (France) Sidney Govou (1 in Super League, 1 in Greek Cup, 1 in Champions League)
- (Argentina) Sebastián Leto (1 in Super League, 1 in play-offs, 1 in Greek Cup)

2 goals

- (Mali) Cédric Kanté (1 in Super League, 1 in Champions League)
- (Spain) Luis García (1 in Super League, 1 in play-offs)

1 goal

- (France) Jean-Alain Boumsong (1 in Super League)
- (Spain) Josu Sarriegi (1 in Greek Cup)
- (Greece) Nikos Spiropoulos (1 in Super League)

Own goals

- (Argentina) Ismael Blanco (AEK)
- (Greece) Christos Pipinis (Asteras Tripolis)
