= Sebastián Leto =

Argentine footballer (born 1986)

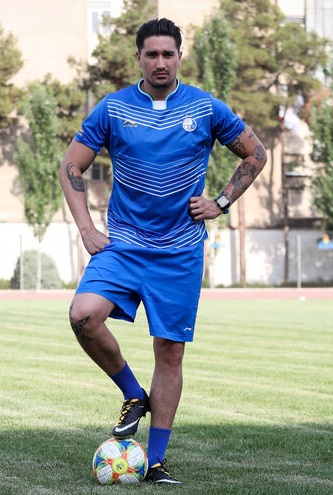
- Leto with Esteghlal in 2019

Personal information
- Full name: Sebastián Eduardo Leto
- Date of birth: 30 August 1986 (age 40)
- Place of birth: Alejandro Korn, Argentina
- Height: 1.88 m (6 ft 2 in)
- Position: Left winger

Team information
- Current team: A.E. Kifisia (manager)

Youth career
- Lanús

Senior career*
Years	Team	Apps	(Gls)
2005–2007	Lanús	52	(8)
2007–2009	Liverpool	0	(0)
2008–2009	→ Olympiacos (loan)	24	(1)
2009–2013	Panathinaikos	64	(23)
2013–2016	Catania	41	(5)
2015–2016	→ Lanús (loan)	4	(0)
2016–2017	Panathinaikos	34	(12)
2017	Emirates Club	9	(2)
Total		228	(51)

Managerial career
- 2024–: A.E. Kifisia
- * Club domestic league appearances and goals as of 17 December 2017

Sebastián Eduardo Leto (born 30 August 1986) is an Argentine professional football manager and former player who is currently the manager of Greek Super League club A.E. Kifisia.

== Playing career ==
=== Lanús ===
Born in Alejandro Korn, Leto began his career with Buenos Aires club Lanús, making his first team debut on 25 June 2005. He spent two seasons at the club, making 52 appearances and scoring 8 goals.

=== Liverpool ===
On 10 August 2007, Leto signed for Liverpool for £1,850,000 ($3.6million). His debut was against Toulouse, in a 4–0 victory for UEFA Champions League qualifying round fixture on 28 August 2007.

Following this, he featured in another Champions League game and two Football League Cup matches. He never made his Premier League debut due to problems with his passport, forcing him to play in the Liverpool reserve team instead. Leto was granted an Italian passport in mid-2007 but this was later revoked, making the Argentine need to apply for a work permit; a request which was later refused. Liverpool manager Rafael Benítez criticised the decision given the player's track record in the Champions League and national selection for the Olympics.

=== Olympiacos ===
Leto joined the Greek team Olympiacos in June 2008 on a one-year loan deal.

On 16 September 2008, Leto scored the second goal in the 2–0 UEFA Cup first round, first leg victory away against Nordsjælland. He scored his first and only league goal in a 2–1 home win against Thrassyvoulos in December 2008.

=== Panathinaikos ===
On 23 June 2009, Liverpool accepted an offer from Panathinaikos believed to be in the region of £3,000,000. On 1 July 2009, the player signed a five-year contract for about 1.2 million (with bonus fees). On 28 July, Leto made his debut appearance for the greens on the away UEFA Champions League qualifying stages game against Sparta Prague, coming from the bench on the second half. On 8 August in Athens, Panathinaikos needed a two-goal margin victory and Leto was one of the starting eleven for the Greek side who dominated the game 3–0 and qualified to the next round. On 19 August, Leto came from the bench to score in Panathinaikos 2–3 defeat to Atlético Madrid in the UEFA Champions League play-off first leg. On 22 August, Leto scored two goals against the Cretan side Ergotelis away in a 3–0 victory. On 13 September, Leto scored the only goal against the Thracians Panthrakikos in an important 1–0 away victory. On 24 April 2010, he scored the victorious goal of Panathinaikos at the Greek Cup final against Aris Thessaloniki. The previous week he also won the Greek championship, thus achieving the double (second consequent double of his career, after the first one with Olympiacos in 2009). After the departure of captain Djibril Cissé and vice-captain Gilberto Silva, he was chosen after two seasons serving the club to be the third Captain.

Leto started the 2011–12 Super League Greece in commanding form, netting a brace in a 3–2 victory over Xanthi on 16 October. He followed this up by notching another brace against Ergotelis on 22 October, in which Panathinaikos ran out 4–0 winners. Leto's good performances were enough for Serie B table-toppers Torino to report interest in the Argentine, as they look to regain status in the Italian top flight.

On 30 October, Panathinaikos faced PAOK, Leto scored a goal as his side won 3–1 and maintained their lead at the top of the Greek first division. In the following game against Ergotelis, Leto added two more goals as his side won 4–0. Leto's inspired start to the season resulted with ten goals and one assist from the first seven games. His performances were enough to guide Panathinaikos to the top of the table on 19 points, having played fewer games than most of their title challengers. Leto continued in brilliant form scoring 15 goals in 13 matches as well as 5 assists, keeping Panathinaikos still in the fight for the title.

Through the first 17 league fixtures, Leto lead the goal-scorers chart with 15 league goals. On 25 January 2012, Leto suffered a knee injury and flew to Bologna to be checked by a specialist who said that he would be forced out at least until March. It was revealed in March, though, that he would not be available until at least early April with continued knee problems. After a few days, it was revealed that Leto would not be available for the whole season. On 22 January 2013, Leto terminated his contract with Panathinaikos.

=== Catania ===
On 16 April 2013, Catania confirmed that they had signed the Argentine on a deal over a few seasons, the exact details of the length and payment were not released. Sebastian Leto was brought in during the summer 2013, on a free transfer as a replacement for the departed Alejandro Gomez. The former Panathinaikos winger had a history of knee problems, which ultimately led to his release from the Greek club. Catania took a gamble, but he failed to live up to expectations. Leto suffered another knee injury and was being unfairly compared to Gomez, who was arguably the Rossazzuri's best player, but the Argentinean did not succeed in making an impact at the club, and in January 2015 signed a year-long loan with his former Argentinian club Lanús. On 11 February 2015, Leto was taken to hospital for emergency treatment after a barbell fell on his head during training. The then 28-year-old, who had been on loan at Argentinian club Lanus since 3 February for a loan fee of €500,000, was initially sent home by the medical staff with a deep wound in his head. But he later went to the hospital after suffering headaches and was placed in intensive care. Doctors feared Leto may have had internal hemorrhaging.

At the end of the loan, Cypriot club Anorthosis have made an offer for Sebastian Leto, but the Argentine left winger asked for a 48-hour deadline because he preferred to join Greek side Panathinaikos. The 29-year-old player was recently released by Lanús and wanted to return to the Greens after three years, asking for a low-salary contract.

=== Second spell at Panathinaikos ===
In early February 2015, there were rumours of a return to Panathinaikos, after Leto was released from Catania. The manager of Palermo, Guillermo Barros Schelotto, spoke about his compatriot and former player at Lanús, Sebastian Leto, and his desire to return in Greece for Panathinaikos. "Leto was enjoying being in an Argentine club and having his family along, but he always wanted to return in Greece for Panathinaikos. He had a serious accident, but he is strong and despite not playing match in Lanus, in a good fitness condition. Sebastian is a talented and clever player, with quality and still a future ahead of him, he will help Panathinaikos very much and maybe the next season decrease the difference from champions Olympiakos", said the 43-year-old Argentine at SDNA.

On 5 February 2016, Panathinaikos officially announced the signing of Sebastian Leto until the end of the following season and the Argentinian left winger returned to the club after three years. On 3 April 2016, he helped his club by scoring a brace to win a game against Veria for the Greek Super League. At the beginning of the 2016–17 Super League Greece, he eventually picked up his favorite number, no.11. On 11 September 2016, he scored his first goal for the 2016–17 season in a 3–0 away win against Levadiakos. On 24 May 2017, thanks to a spot kick by the experienced Argentine attacking midfielder, Panathinaikos won a crucial game rivals AEK Athens at the Leoforos Alexandras Stadium, for the 2016-17 Play-offs.

On 1 June 2017, Panathinaikos announced that the club will not renew Leto's contract, so their relationship ended.

On 8 October 2017, Leto, (after Michael Essien, Rasmus Thelander, Jens Wemmer, Stathis Tavlaridis and Niklas Hult) became the latest player to file an appeal against Panathinaikos for late payment. The Argentinian claimed had not been paid his wages by the club since January 2017, estimated to amount to €181,315.

=== Emirates Club ===
On 20 August 2017, he signed a long season contract, with the possible extension for a year, with UAE Arabian Gulf League club Emirates Club. On 17 September in his debut with the club, he scored his first goal against Al Dhafra, sealing a 3–3 home draw.

== Career statistics ==
As of 7 December 2017

Club	Season	League			National Cup		League Cup		Continental		Total	
Club	Season	Division	Apps	Goals	Apps	Goals	Apps	Goals	Apps	Goals	Apps	Goals
Lanús	2004–05	Argentine Primera División	2	1	–		–		0	0	2	1
Lanús	2005–06	Argentine Primera División	21	4	–		–		0	0	21	4
Lanús	2006–07	Argentine Primera División	29	3	–		–		0	0	29	3
Lanús	Total		52	8	0	0	0	0	0	0	52	8
Liverpool	2007–08	Premier League	0	0	0	0	2	0	2	0	4	0
Olympiacos	2008–09	Super League Greece	24	1	3	0	–		8	1	35	2
Panathinaikos	2009–10	Super League Greece	25	6	6	1	–		13	1	44	8
Panathinaikos	2010–11	Super League Greece	22	2	3	1	–		3	0	28	3
Panathinaikos	2011–12	Super League Greece	17	15	0	0	–		4	1	21	16
Panathinaikos	Total		64	23	9	2	0	0	20	2	93	27
Catania	2013–14	Serie A	27	3	1	1	–		–		28	4
Catania	2014–15	Serie B	14	2	0	0	–		–		14	2
Catania	Total		41	5	1	1	0	0	0	0	42	6
Lanús	2015	Argentine Primera División	4	0	–		–		3	0	7	0
Panathinaikos	2015–16	Super League Greece	12	5	0	0	–		0	0	12	5
Panathinaikos	2016–17	Super League Greece	22	7	5	4	–		8	0	34	11
Panathinaikos	Total		34	12	5	4	0	0	8	0	46	16
Emirates Club	2017–18	UAE Pro-League	9	2	3	0	–		0	0	12	2
Career total			227	51	21	7	2	0	41	3	291	61

== Managerial statistics ==
As of match played 22 November 2026

Managerial record by team and tenure
Team	From	To	Record							
Team	From	To	G	W	D	L	GF	GA	GD	Win %
A.E. Kifisia	1 July 2024	Present	90	41	25	24	140	100	+40	45.56
Career total			90	41	25	24	140	100	+40	45.56

== Honours ==
Player

Olympiacos

- Super League Greece: 2008–09
- Greek Football Cup: 2008–09

Panathinaikos

- Super League Greece: 2009–10
- Greek Football Cup: 2009–10

Manager

A.E. Kifisia

- Super League Greece 2: 2024–25
