= Boumsong =

Boumsong is a surname. Notable people with the surname include:

- Daniel Maa Boumsong (born 1987), Cameroonian footballer
- Jean-Alain Boumsong (born 1979), Cameroonian-born French footballer
- Jean Paul Boumsong (born 1985), Cameroonian footballer
- Raphael Boumsong (born 1989), Cameroonian footballer
