= Orestis Karnezis =

Greek footballer (born 1985)

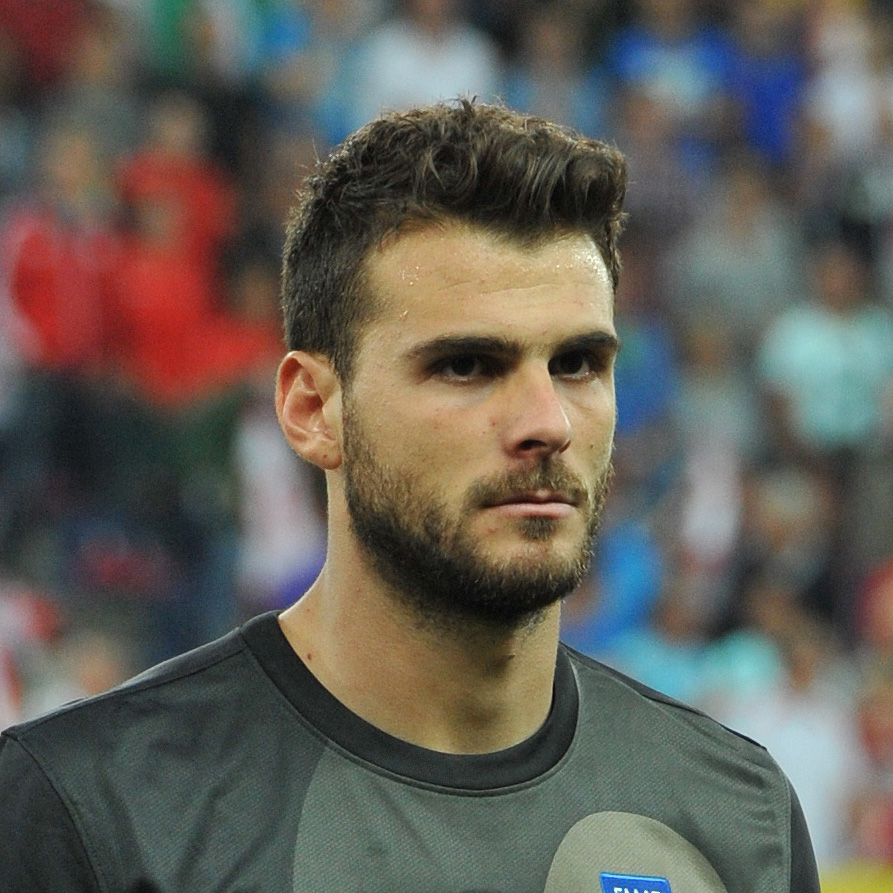
- Karnezis with Greece in 2013

Personal information
- Full name: Orestis-Spyridon Karnezis
- Date of birth: 11 July 1985 (age 41)
- Place of birth: Athens, Greece
- Height: 1.90 m (6 ft 3 in)
- Position: Goalkeeper

Youth career
- 1999–2003: OFAM
- 2003–2005: OFI

Senior career*
Years	Team	Apps	(Gls)
2005–2007	OFI	0	(0)
2007–2013	Panathinaikos	53	(0)
2013–2019	Udinese	108	(0)
2013–2014	→ Granada (loan)	6	(0)
2017–2018	→ Watford (loan)	15	(0)
2018–2019	→ Napoli (loan)	9	(0)
2019–2020	Napoli	0	(0)
2020–2022	Lille	0	(0)
2021–2022	Lille II	3	(0)
Total		194	(0)

International career
2004–2005	Greece U21	3	(0)
2012–2018	Greece	49	(0)
- * Club domestic league appearances and goals as of 21:17, 22 May 2022 (UTC)

Orestis-Spyridon Karnezis (Greek: Ορέστης-Σπυρίδων Καρνέζης; born 11 July 1985) is a Greek former professional footballer who played as a goalkeeper.

== Club career ==
=== Panathinaikos ===
Born in Athens, but raised in Corfu, Karnezis started his professional football career at Panathinaikos in 2007. He made only a few appearances for the club until the 2011–12 season, when he got more chances and impressed. After a few months, his coach, Jesualdo Ferreira, made him the regular goalkeeper of Panathinaikos. He had great performances and saved his team at crucial moments. Reports from Greece indicate that Karnezis was the subject of transfer speculation, as the Greek international attracted suitors from around Europe, following a solid campaign in the Super League Greece 2012–13 season. Reports from Greece indicated that Udinese Calcio emerged as front-runners to sign Karnezis, after the Italian club reportedly offered €800,000 to bring Karnezis to the Serie A that summer. Karnezis took over as Panathinaikos' number one choice in goal that season and played admirably for the Athens giants. Karnezis' exploits for the Trifylli earned him consistent call-ups to the Greece national football team.

=== Udinese ===
Karnezis completed his move from Panathinaikos to Udinese Calcio, after the two clubs reached an agreement over the Greece international's transfer. The 28-year-old keeper had been linked with a move to the Serie A side in recent weeks, with Panathinaikos manager Yannis Anastasiou keen to use income from the transfer to continue building his squad. A fee of €750,000 had been quoted by the Greek press, with a further €2 million due to Panathinaikos if the player returned to Greece to play with another club in the future. Karnezis signed a five-year contract on 22 July 2013, then was immediately loaned out to Spain's Granada for the season by the Italian club.

==== Loan to Granada ====
Karnezis made his Spanish La Liga debut for Granada in a 3–0 away loss to Almeria on 4 January 2014. Karnezis had earlier in the season played in both legs of the Copa del Rey (Spanish Cup) against AD Alcorcón on 8 December 2013 and 18 December 2013.

On 12 April, Karnezis was the key player in a 1–0 home victory against Barcelona, saving a shot from Cesc Fàbregas and a 20-yard free-kick from Lionel Messi. Barça totalled 29 shots on goal, none of which succeeded in beating Karnezis.

==== 2014–15 season ====
In his return to Udinese after the loan stint with Granada in La Liga, Karnezis made his Serie A debut in Udinese's 2–0 home victory over Empoli on 31 August 2014. On 9 November 2014, Udinese managed to scrap a 1–1 draw against Palermo as Karnezis parried a Franco Vazquez penalty. On 15 March 2015, Andrea Stramaccioni praised Karnezis and Antonio Di Natale after Udinese picked up a point against Atalanta, by stating that throughout the year and not only in that game, Karnezis gave a sense of security to the squad, even without necessarily making difficult saves.

Italian sports newspaper La Gazzetta dello Sport claimed that Napoli were interested in signing Karnezis after his remarkable 2014–15 season with Udinese. "It is too early", his agent Vasilis Panayotakis said. "We will see what happens after May 20, when we know what is really going on with the clubs that have shown interest. Karnezis is committed to Udinese until the end of the season, that is more important right now". During the season former Italian national goalkeeper Dino Zoff had heaped praise on both Karnezis and Mattia Perin, labelling the pair the best glovesmen in Serie A.“It's going well, he's young and can only get better: he is taking confidence that is essential for a goalkeeper. I think Karnezis and Perin are the best goalies in Series A.”

On 14 May 2015, Udinese confirmed they were ready to sell Karnezis, to make room for Simone Scuffet. Roma were interested and he was linked with a move to the Giallorossi. "Karnezis could've gone to Benfica last summer, but Andrea Stramaccioni decided to focus on his international experience," explained Udinese director Andrea Carnevale on TeleRadioStereo. "Now with his excellent season, he can go to a more important club. Our future is Simone Scuffet. We've been preserving him, as a season working as understudy to Karnezis has helped him to grow."

On 24 May 2015, in a home game against Sassuolo, Karnezis was injured. The hosts were forced to make their first substitution in the 29th minute, with Scuffet replacing Karnezis. According to La Gazzetta dello Sport, discussions over a new agreement had begun and the 29-year-old goalkeeper was ready to put pen to paper, to extend his stay until 2020. Udinese Calcio had turned down offers from Roma, Inter, Napoli, Benfica and other European clubs.

==== 2015–16 season ====
On 1 July 2015, Karnezis signed a new contract until June 2019 with the Friuli outfit. "Udinese Calcio announces the renewal with mutual satisfaction of the economic agreement in place with the goalkeeper Orestis Karnezis," read the statement. “The contract of the Bianconeri player will now expire on 30 June 2019." In the opening game of the 2015–16 season against champions Juventus, Karnezis had a particularly strong second-half when Juve piled on the pressure, coming up with key saves and marshalling his backline to more effectively stop the Bianconeri forwards, helping his club to achieve a win. On 25 October 2015, he made key saves helping his club extend their unbeaten run in Serie A to four matches by edging to a 1–0 victory over Frosinone at the Stadio Friuli. On 1 November 2015, in a 0–0 home draw against Sassuolo the visitors threatened with Gregoire Defrel who crashed in two strikes that had to be kept out by Karnezis. On 8 November 2015, Karnezis kept his side level with two good pieces of goalkeeping, as Napoli continued to knock on the door, first when he dived low to keep out Gonzalo Higuaín's effort, before he smothered the ball at the feet of José Callejón minutes later, after Higuain had slipped the Spaniard through. Despite his saves, the club could not avoid a 1–0 away defeat. On 20 December 2015, with his crucial saves, along with a late first half goal from his teammate Stipe Perica, who rifled a shot past the outstretched fingers of the ‘keeper to nestle inside the far post, and besides the fact that they finished the game with 10 players due to Molla Wague's expulsion, he helped his club to escape with a 1–0 away win against Torino. On 9 January 2016, despite his remarkable save one-on-one on Cristian Zaccardo, sticking out a trailing foot to deny the angled drive, his club suffered a surprise 2–1 away loss against Carpi in the Serie A. On 7 February 2016, in a 1–1 away draw against Milan, Karnezis was in fine form and produced sensational saves to deny Carlos Bacca, Mario Balotelli and Riccardo Montolivo kicks, helping his club to escape with a valuable draw. On 24 April, thanks to Karnezis, mUdinese managed to keep the score down to 3–1 against Inter as he made some fantastic saves to deny Geoffrey Kondogbia, Marcelo Brozović and Ivan Perišić, to keep his side afloat. On 14 May 2016, he was voted by the fans as the MVP of the club for the 2015–16 season. On 15 May 2016, he set a new record for the 2015–16 season, as he was the only ever-present.

==== 2016–17 season ====
Karnezis started the 2016–17 season as the undisputed first-choice goalkeeper for the club. On 11 December 2016, he put on a superb performance as Luigi Delneri's men managed to win where teams like Roma couldn't. If the 3–1 scoreline was harsh on Atalanta, it's because La Dea had a myriad of chances, but Karnezis denied plenty of goals. Without the keeper's wonder saves, the game could have gone very differently. In at least five cases he was superb, even stopping from his own teammate Silvan Widmer. On overall, in December 2016 Karnezis had only been forced to pick the ball out of his own net once in the last four matches, with clean sheets against U.C. Sampdoria, F.C. Crotone and Bologna. On 5 February 2017, in a 0–0 away draw against Chievo, Karnezis reached 100 appearances with the jersey of the club in all competitions. On 19 February 2017, in a frustrating defeat against Sassuolo, he reached 100 appearances in the jersey of Udinese in Serie A, in a game where the Greek international performed a desperate double save on Matteo Politano and the Federico Ricci follow-up. On 12 March 2017, in a 3–1 away win against Pescara, he suffered an injury and replaced by his teammate Scuffed. Karnezis was diagnosed with a dislocated finger and a micro-fracture at the base of his right little finger. His hand was immobilised with a cast for the next three weeks. On 9 April 2017, he returned to the squad in a 3–0 Serie A home game against Genoa C.F.C.

Karnezis was caught between Napoli and Watford for the next season. The Greek international turned 32 in July and was under contract with Udinese until June 2019. However, with Alex Meret returning from his loan at Spal and Simone Scuffet also on the books, the Friulani have no shortage of talented goalkeepers. According to sources, Karnezis would join Napoli and replace the increasingly shaky Pepe Reina, or even act as his understudy. He instead joined Marco Silva's Watford, to meet another former Greek international José Holebas. As a result of this possibility, since 14 May, Udinese's coach Luigi Delneri decided to start Simone Scuffet for the remaining matches of the season.

=== Watford ===
12 hours before the closure of the transfer market, Watford announced the signing of Karnezis on a one-season loan from Udinese. The 32-year old would compete with Heurelho Gomes for the starting place at Vicarage Road.

On 5 November 2017, in a 3–2 away loss against Everton, the club lost first-choice keeper Heurelho Gomes, who was taken off with a nasty head gash shortly before Christian Kabasele's goal. It proved to be the turning point, as Karnezis, on his Watford debut, was at fault for Everton's first when he came rushing out and Oumar Niasse darted past him and bundled the ball home. He was at fault for the second one too. On 21 January 2018, he returned to the starting XI in a 2–0 away loss game against Leicester City While a 2–0 defeat, which proved to be Marco Silva's final game in charge, was hardly the ideal place to make his bow, Karnezis was pleased with his display. On 31 January 2018, in his third appearance in Premier League, Karnezis made a remarkable save on Stoke City winger Xherdan Shaqiri's fierce volley kick, helping his club to gain a crucial point in its rally to stay in the League. His overall performance placed him in the best team of the matchday, becoming the first Watford keeper to keep a clean sheet in 12 Premier League outings.

=== Napoli ===
On 5 July 2018, Napoli announced the signing of Karnezis from Udinese on a three-season contract, for an estimated fee of €2.5 million. The 32-year old would compete with Alex Meret, a young promising Italian goalie, for the starting place at Stadio San Paolo. On 17 August 2018, after Karnezis' mediocre appearances in the preparation matches, in the place of Meret who seriously injured a month ago, the administration of the club decided to acquire David Ospina in a season-long contract from Arsenal, who took over as the leading goalie for the beginning of the 2018–19 season. On 18 August 2018, despite the odds, he made his official debut with the club as a starter, in a 2–1 away win against S.S. Lazio.

On 26 February 2019, Karnezis has only made six official appearances on the season. David Ospina took over as the club's starting goalkeeper and is now the new number two since Meret has recovered from injury. Karnezis has dropped to the club's third string goalie, but Napoli have decided to sign Karnezis on a permanent move as the club announced.

=== Lille ===
In July 2020, Karnezis moved to French side Lille in a transfer that sent Lille's player Victor Osimhen the other way. The Greek ex-international had a contract until June 2021 with Napoli, but in Lille he signed a closed 3 years contract, with a total gross salary of €4.5 million. With his move to Lille, Karnezis makes history after becoming the first Greek footballer to have played in 4 of the 5 top European leagues, namely in the La Liga (Granada CF), Serie A (Udinese Calcio and S.S.C. Napoli), Premier League (Watford F.C.) and now in Ligue 1.

== International career ==
Karnezis's good performances led Greece national football team coach Fernando Santos to call him for a friendly match on 29 February 2012 against Belgium, in which he made his international debut, playing the entire game. Unfortunately for Karnezis, Fernando Santos didn't call him for UEFA Euro 2012 to be one of the three goalkeepers of the Greece national team. Fernando Santos said: "If Karnezis keeps going that way, he will be without a doubt in the squad of the Greece national team for the qualifying matches of Mundial 2014." And, indeed, he was called to be part of Greece national team both for a friendly game with Norway and for the qualifying matches after that. Karnezis was called by Greece national manager Fernando Santos to the 30 man provisional World Cup squad, and also to the final 23-man squad for 2014 FIFA World Cup.

== Career statistics ==
=== Club ===
Appearances and goals by club, season and competition
Club	Season	League			Cup (Note: Includes appearances in Greek Cup, Copa del Rey, Coppa Italia, FA Cup, EFL Cup, and Coupe de France)		Continental		Total	
Club	Season	Division	Apps	Goals	Apps	Goals	Apps	Goals	Apps	Goals
OFI	2005–06	Alpha Ethniki	0	0	0	0	—		0	0
OFI	2006–07	Super League Greece	0	0	0	0	—		0	0
OFI	Total		0	0	0	0	—		0	0
Panathinaikos	2007–08	Super League Greece	1	0	0	0	0	0	1	0
Panathinaikos	2008–09	Super League Greece	0	0	0	0	0	0	0	0
Panathinaikos	2009–10	Super League Greece	1	0	0	0	0	0	1	0
Panathinaikos	2010–11	Super League Greece	0	0	4	0	0	0	4	0
Panathinaikos	2011–12	Super League Greece	22	0	2	0	0	0	24	0
Panathinaikos	2012–13	Super League Greece	29	0	1	0	10	0	40	0
Panathinaikos	Total		53	0	7	0	10	0	70	0
Udinese	2014–15	Serie A	37	0	0	0	—		37	0
Udinese	2015–16	Serie A	38	0	1	0	—		39	0
Udinese	2016–17	Serie A	33	0	1	0	—		34	0
Udinese	Total		108	0	2	0	—		110	0
Granada (loan)	2013–14	La Liga	6	0	2	0	—		8	0
Watford (loan)	2017–18	Premier League	15	0	1	0	—		16	0
Napoli (loan)	2018–19	Serie A	9	0	0	0	0	0	9	0
Napoli	2019–20	Serie A	0	0	0	0	0	0	0	0
Napoli	Total		9	0	0	0	0	0	9	0
Lille	2020–21	Ligue 1	0	0	1	0	0	0	1	0
Lille II	2021–22	Championnat National 3	3	0	—		—		3	0
Career total			194	0	13	0	10	0	217	0

=== International ===
Appearances and goals by national team and year
National team	Year	Apps	Goals
Greece	2012	7	0
Greece	2013	10	0
Greece	2014	10	0
Greece	2015	7	0
Greece	2016	7	0
Greece	2017	7	0
Greece	2018	1	0
Total		49	0

== Honours ==
Panathinaikos

- Super League Greece: 2009–10
- Greek Cup: 2009–10

Napoli

- Coppa Italia: 2019–20

Lille

- Ligue 1: 2020–21
- Trophée des Champions: 2021
