= Usero =

Usero is a Spanish surname. Notable people with the surname include:

- Fernando Usero (born 1984), Spanish former professional footballer
- Nancy Usero, Spanish rhythmic gymnast
- Paula Usero (born 1991), Spanish actress
