= Jean-Alain Boumsong =

French footballer (born 1979)

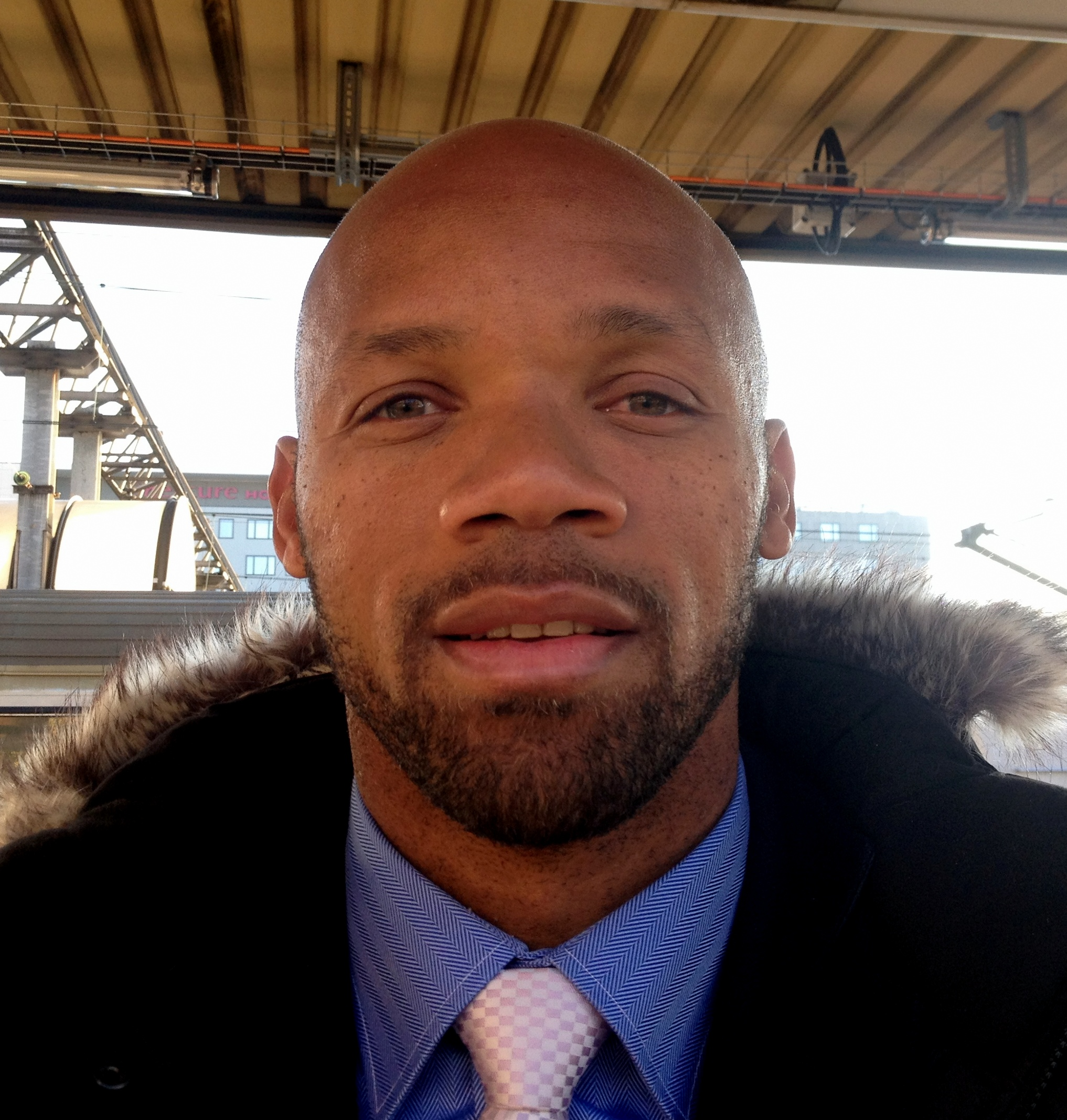
- Boumsong in 2013

Personal information
- Full name: Jean-Alain Boumsong Somkong
- Date of birth: 14 December 1979 (age 46)
- Place of birth: Douala, Cameroon
- Height: 1.91 m (6 ft 3 in)
- Position: Centre-back

Senior career*
Years	Team	Apps	(Gls)
1997–2000	Le Havre	42	(1)
2000–2004	Auxerre	131	(3)
2004–2005	Rangers	18	(2)
2005–2006	Newcastle United	47	(0)
2006–2008	Juventus	33	(2)
2008–2010	Lyon	59	(2)
2010–2013	Panathinaikos	52	(5)
Total		382	(15)

International career
2003–2009	France	27	(1)

Managerial career
- 2018–2019: Cameroon (assistant)
Medal record
Men's football
Representing France
FIFA Confederations Cup
Winner	2003
FIFA World Cup
Runner-up	2006
- * Club domestic league appearances and goals

Jean-Alain Boumsong Somkong (born 14 December 1979) is a French former professional footballer who played as a defender.

Boumsong began his senior career with French club Le Havre in 1997 before joining AJ Auxerre in 2000. His performances at Auxerre earned him a move to Rangers in 2004. One season later, he signed with Newcastle United. where he spent two seasons. In 2006, he joined Juventus, freshly relegated to Serie B and helped the club return to Serie A. He returned to France with Lyon in 2008. His last spell was at Super League Greece side Panathinaikos before ending his career in 2013. Between 2003 and 2009, he made 27 appearances scoring 1 goal for the France national team.

== Club career ==
=== Early career ===
Boumsong was born in Douala, Cameroon, and started his career with French team Le Havre before joining AJ Auxerre. He notably scored the 89th-minute winning goal in Auxerre's 2–1 win in the 2003 French Cup Final against Paris Saint-Germain.

A long-time target for then Liverpool manager Gérard Houllier, the press speculated that it was only a matter of time before Boumsong signed for Liverpool. However, as Boumsong was a free agent, his agent, the Monaco based Scot Willie McKay negotiated the best sign-on fee to the player for Boumsong from Scottish Premier League club Rangers.

=== Rangers ===
As a result, Boumsong joined Alex McLeish at Rangers in 2004 and signed a five-year contract. Boumsong quickly adapted to the Scottish game and showed his skill as a centre-back, leading to rumours that his stay in Glasgow may be shorter than expected. Halfway through the 2004–05 season, Newcastle under new manager Graeme Souness, made an £8 million bid for him, which Rangers accepted in a deal that was finalized once the January 2005 transfer window opened. However, as Boumsong had played the requisite number of games for Rangers that season, he still received a Scottish Premiership Winners Medal, despite having been a Newcastle player for around five months by the time Rangers won the title.

=== Newcastle United ===
Boumsong signed a 5 1/2-year contract with the Magpies.

The £8 million transfer fee raised eyebrows, as the player, being out of contract, had joined Rangers for free just months before, at which point Newcastle showed no interest in signing him. This transfer is one of those about which the Stevens inquiry report in June 2007 expressed concerns:

"There remains inconsistencies in evidence provided by Graeme Souness – a former manager of the club – and Freddy Shepherd – apparently acting in an undefined role but not as a club official – as to their respective roles in transfer negotiations."

"The inquiry is still awaiting clarification from agent Willie McKay".

However the Stevens enquiry later issued two clarifications. It said of Souness, "We wish to make it clear that inconsistencies did not exist within the evidence given by Graeme Souness to Quest concerning his role in transfers covered by the Inquiry during his time as manager of Newcastle United F.C. and neither the Premier League nor do Quest have any concerns in this regard". As regards McKay it stated: "Further to the key findings from the final Quest report published on 15 June 2007 by the Premier League, Quest would like to emphasise that, in that report, it was clear that no evidence of irregular payments was found in the transfers in the inquiry period which involved the agent Willie McKay. Quest would also like to thank Mr McKay for his cooperation with the inquiry."

He had a mixed time during his stay on Tyneside in regards to his form. During his first season at Newcastle he was praised for his defensive abilities and partnership with Titus Bramble. His popularity led to fans shouting the first syllable of his name, elongating the sound in a similar way to Arsenal fans chanting Nwankwo Kanu's name.

=== Juventus ===
On 22 August 2006, Boumsong joined the recently Serie B relegated Juventus for a fee of £3.3m, with future incentives promised to Newcastle relating to Juventus' future performance. In September 2006, Boumsong scored his first Juventus goal in a game against Crotone where Juventus won 3–0. Valeri Bojinov scored the other two goals. In Boumsong's final match with Juventus, he scored a key equaliser in their Coppa Italia match against rivals Inter Milan on 23 January 2008.

=== Lyon ===
On 24 January 2008, Boumsong moved to French club Olympique Lyonnais on a three-and-a-half-year contract. He stated he made this move in order to increase his chances to make Raymond Domenech's EURO 2008 squad.

He made his debut for the club in 4–1 win over Sochaux at Stade de Gerland on 8 February 2008. In the 2008–09 season, he scored his first Lyon's goal against Le Mans on 4 April 2009.

=== Panathinaikos ===
On 30 July 2010, Boumsong transferred from Olympique Lyonnais to Super League Greece champions Panathinaikos F.C. for a fee that could rise up to €750,000. He signed a three-year contract with the Greek club, earning €1.9 million annually. Although he started the season roughly, he gradually improved his performance and gained the fans' trust. He scored his first goal in a 2–0 win against Panserraikos.

In 2012, Boumsong signed a two-year contract with the club, extending his stay at Panathinaikos until 2014. During the summer, Boumsong was declared vice-captain of the club for the 2012–13 season. He scored the opening goal in a 2–0 win against Motherwell in the first leg of the third qualifying round of the 2012–13 UEFA Champions League.

== International career ==
Boumsong made his France debut against Japan on 20 June 2003 and went with the squad for Euro 2004, although he only made a brief appearance coming on as a substitute in one game.

He established himself as a regular starter in the national team in the 2006 World Cup qualifiers, and was called up to the squad for the 2006 World Cup, but did not see any game action during the competition because of Lillian Thuram's return to the team. Boumsong was also named in the France squad for Euro 2008.

Boumsong appeared in only one game during Euro 2008, when during the group match between France and Italy he substituted Samir Nasri. Nasri himself entered the field only 16 minutes earlier, when he replaced the injured Franck Ribéry, however when central defender Eric Abidal was sent off, French coach Raymond Domenech decided to pull off the midfielder Nasri from the field for the defender Boumsong. Four years earlier during the Euro 2004, Boumsong had been already sent to the field once as a substitute's substitute, when he replaced William Gallas during a match against Switzerland, thus he is the first player in European Championship history to achieve this feat twice.

== Coaching career ==
After retiring, Boumsong started working as a consultant for the global TV station beIN Sports. On 5 September 2018 it was confirmed, that Boumsong had been appointed assistant manager of newly hired manager Clarence Seedorf for the Cameroon national football team alongside Patrick Kluivert and Joël Epalle. He was dismissed in September 2019.

== Style of play ==
Boumsong was known for his physical strength, pace and reading of the game.

== Personal life ==
Boumsong acquired French nationality by naturalization on 16 January 2002.

His younger brother, Yannick Boumsong, is also a professional footballer. He is the older cousin of David Ngog.

== Career statistics ==
=== Club ===
Appearances and goals by club, season and competition
Club	Season	League			National cup		League cup		Continental		Other		Total	
Club	Season	Division	Apps	Goals	Apps	Goals	Apps	Goals	Apps	Goals	Apps	Goals	Apps	Goals
Le Havre	1997–98	Division 1	1	0					–		–		1	0
Le Havre	1998–99	Division 1	18	1	2	0	2	0	–		–		22	1
Le Havre	1999–2000	Division 1	23	0			1	0	–		–		24	0
Le Havre	Total		42	1	2	0	3	0	0	0	0	0	47	1
Auxerre	2000–01	Division 1	32	0			2	0	2	0	–		36	0
Auxerre	2001–02	Division 1	34	1			2	0	–		–		36	1
Auxerre	2002–03	Ligue 1	33	1	1	1	1	0	6	0	–		41	2
Auxerre	2003–04	Ligue 1	32	1			2	0	1	0	–		35	1
Auxerre	Total		131	3	1	1	7	0	9	0	0	0	148	4
Rangers	2004–05	Scottish Premier League	18	2					6	0	–		24	2
Newcastle United	2004–05	Premier League	14	0	1	0	–		–		–		15	0
Newcastle United	2005–06	Premier League	33	0	1	0	–		–		–		34	0
Newcastle United	Total		47	0	2	0	0	0	0	0	0	0	49	0
Juventus	2006–07	Serie B	33	2	–		–		–		–		33	2
Juventus	2007–08	Serie A	0	0	3	1	–		–		–		3	1
Juventus	Total		33	2	3	1	0	0	0	0	0	0	36	3
Lyon	2007–08	Ligue 1	8	0	4	0	0	0	1	0	–		13	0
Lyon	2008–09	Ligue 1	32	1	3	1	0	0	8	0	–		43	2
Lyon	2009–10	Ligue 1	19	1	2	1	2	0	6	0	–		29	2
Lyon	Total		59	2	9	2	2	0	15	0	0	0	85	4
Panathinaikos	2010–11	Super League Greece	21	1	1	0	–		5	0	4 (Note: Appearances in Super League Greece playoffs)	0	31	1
Panathinaikos	2011–12	Super League Greece	17	3	–		–		4	2	6	0	27	5
Panathinaikos	2012–13	Super League Greece	14	1	1	0	–		4	0	1 (Note: Appearance in play-off for sixth place against Skoda Xanthi on 9 May 2013)	0	20	1
Panathinaikos	Total		52	5	2	0	0	0	13	2	11	0	78	7
Career total			382	15	19	4	12	0	43	2	11	0	467	21

=== International ===
Score and result list France's goal tally first, score column indicates score after Boumsong goal

International goal scored by Jean-Alain Boumsong
No.	Date	Venue	Opponent	Score	Result	Competition
1	11 October 2003	Stade de France, Saint-Denis, France	Israel	3–0	3–0	UEFA Euro 2004 qualifying

== Honours ==
Auxerre

- Coupe de France: 2002–03

Rangers

- Scottish Premier League: 2004–05

Juventus

- Serie B: 2006–07

Lyon

- Ligue 1: 2007–08
- Coupe de France: 2007–08

France

- FIFA Confederations Cup: 2003
- FIFA World Cup runner-up: 2006
