= Bryce Moon =

South African soccer player (born 1986)

Personal information
- Full name: Bryce Daren Moon
- Date of birth: 6 April 1986 (age 40)
- Place of birth: Pietermaritzburg, South Africa
- Height: 1.77 m (5 ft 9 1/2 in)
- Positions: Right back; right winger

Youth career
- Pirates (PMB)
- School of Excellence
- Ajax Cape Town

Senior career*
Years	Team	Apps	(Gls)
2004–2005	Coleraine	32	(5)
2005–2008	Ajax Cape Town	72	(5)
2008–2011	Panathinaikos	21	(1)
2009–2010	→ PAOK (loan)	6	(0)
2010–2011	→ Golden Arrows (loan)	11	(5)
2011–2013	Supersport United	17	(0)
2012–2013	→ Bidvest Wits (loan)	23	(1)
2013–2015	Mamelodi Sundowns	21	(0)
2015	→ Platinum Stars (loan)	9	(0)
2015–2016	Black Aces/Cape Town City	17	(0)
2016–2017	Maritzburg United	5	(0)

International career^{‡}
2007–2017	South Africa	17	(1)
- * Club domestic league appearances and goals as of 30 July 2013 ‡ National team caps and goals as of 26 May 2012

Bryce Moon (born 6 April 1986 in Pietermaritzburg, KwaZulu-Natal) is a retired South African football player who last played for Maritzburg United as a defender and midfielder.

An attacking right-back and a decent crosser of the ball, Moon is nicknamed "Scooter" for his blistering pace.

== International career ==
He made his national team debut for South Africa in a 1–0 win against Botswana on 29 September 2007 and has so far been capped 17 times, scoring one goal.

Moon was also part of South Africa's squad at the 2008 Africa Cup of Nations and the 2009 FIFA Confederations Cup.

=== International Goals ===
#	Date	Venue	Opponent	Score	Result	Competition
1	16 January 2008	Durban, South Africa	Botswana	1–0	2–1	Friendly match

== Honours ==
=== Club ===
- ABSA Cup 2007

== Fatal car crash, 2009 ==
On 30 June 2009, Moon struck and killed a 25-year-old female pedestrian from Tembisa while driving in Sandton, Johannesburg. He sustained minor injuries and faced culpable homicide charges. The charges were dropped in April 2010 but were reinstated in January 2011.

On 12 April 2013 he was found guilty of culpable homicide in the Randburg Magistrate's Court. Magistrate Vincent Pienaar said Moon's version that he was not speeding at the time of the accident is false. He said Bryce Moon had no regard for his victim's life. He was acquitted of murder, attempted murder, drunk driving and reckless driving.
