= Josu Sarriegi =

Spanish footballer (born 1979)

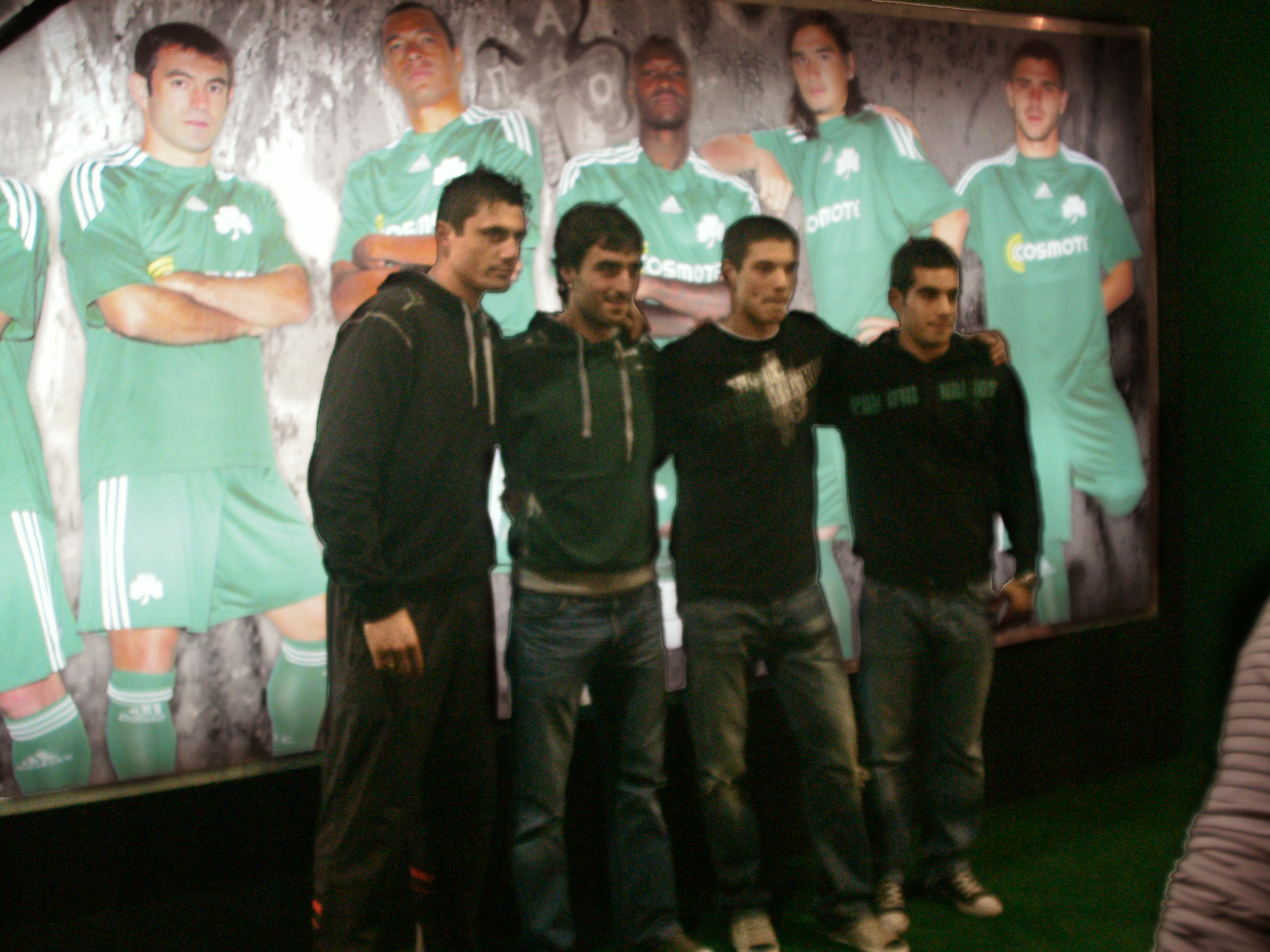
- Sarriegi (second from left) in 2009

Personal information
- Full name: Josu Sarriegi Zumarraga
- Date of birth: 19 January 1979 (age 47)
- Place of birth: Lazkao, Spain
- Height: 1.85 m (6 ft 1 in)
- Position: Centre-back

Youth career
- 1994–1997: Lazkao

Senior career*
Years	Team	Apps	(Gls)
1997–1998	Lazkao		
1998–1999	Beasain	28	(0)
1999–2004	Alavés B	100	(3)
2000–2006	Alavés	85	(4)
2002–2003	→ Eibar (loan)	28	(1)
2006–2007	Athletic Bilbao	36	(0)
2007–2012	Panathinaikos	113	(3)
Total		390	(11)

International career
2006–2007	Basque Country	3	(1)
- * Club domestic league appearances and goals

Josu Sarriegi Zumarraga (born 19 January 1979) is a Spanish former professional footballer who played as a central defender.

In his country, he represented Alavés, Eibar and Athletic Bilbao, appearing in 71 La Liga games over four seasons. He added 78 matches in the Segunda División (five goals in total).

From 2007 until his retirement, Sarriegi was a member of Super League Greece club Panathinaikos.

== Club career ==
Sarriegi was born in Lazkao, Gipuzkoa. He began his professional career with modest and amateur Basque clubs, signing for Deportivo Alavés in 1999 and making his first-team debut on 18 February 2001 in a 1–0 away win against CA Osasuna.

After a loan at neighbours SD Eibar in the Segunda División, Sarriegi renewed his contract for a further three years, then played 28 games in the 2004–05 season as Alavés returned to La Liga after two years of absence. In the following campaign he was also first choice, but his team was relegated again.

Having missed only two league matches with another Basque side, Athletic Bilbao, in 2006–07, Sarriegi joined Greece's Panathinaikos F.C. in August 2007. On 26 November 2008, he scored the winning goal for the Athens club as it defeated Inter Milan 1–0 in the UEFA Champions League in a group-stage fixture at the San Siro.

On 9 July 2010, after appearing regularly over the course of three years, the 31-year-old Sarriegi extended his contract for a further two seasons. The following year, as Djibril Cissé and Gilberto Silva had departed, he was voted by his teammates as the new captain.

== Honours ==
Panathinaikos

- Super League Greece: 2009–10
- Greek Football Cup: 2009–10
