= Sotiris Ninis =

Greek footballer (born 1990)

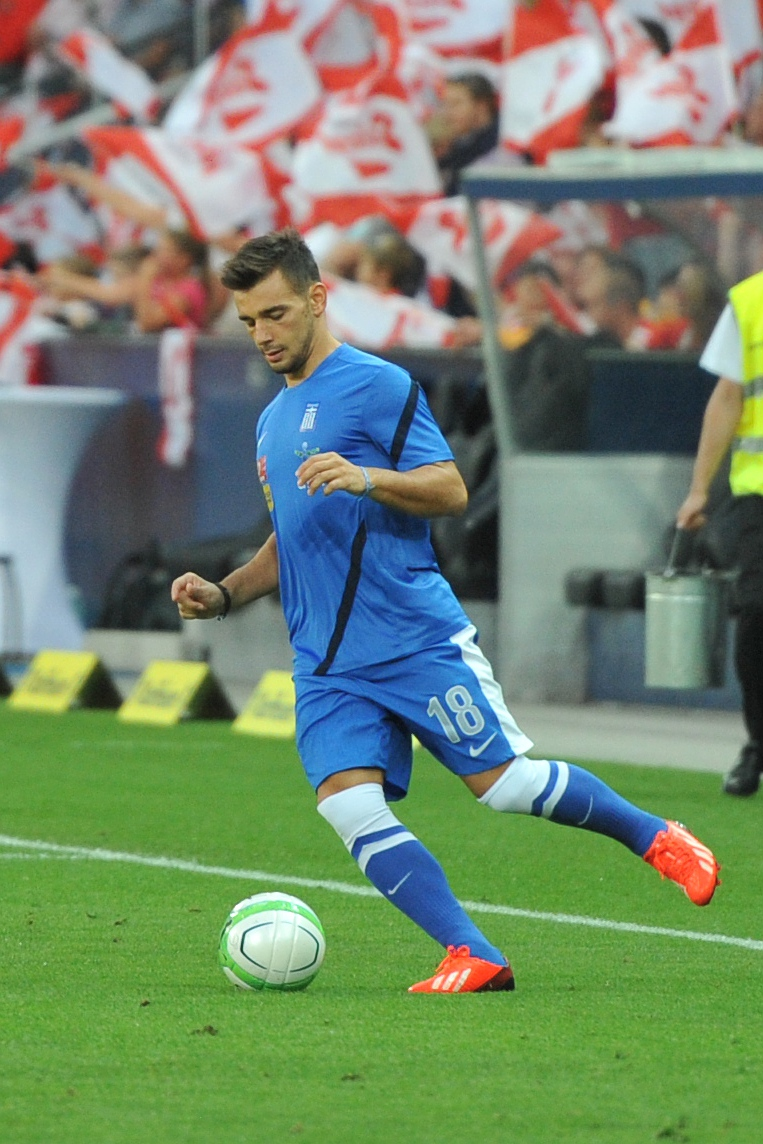
- Ninis with Greece in 2013

Personal information
- Full name: Sotirios Ninis
- Date of birth: 3 April 1990 (age 36)
- Place of birth: Himarë, Albania
- Height: 1.73 m (5 ft 8 in)
- Positions: Attacking midfielder; right winger

Youth career
- 2000–2001: Apollon Smyrnis
- 2001–2003: Giannis Pathiakakis Academies
- 2003–2006: Panathinaikos

Senior career*
Years	Team	Apps	(Gls)
2006–2012	Panathinaikos	100	(11)
2012–2014	Parma	14	(0)
2013–2014	→ PAOK (loan)	12	(0)
2014–2016	Panathinaikos	23	(0)
2016–2017	Charleroi	25	(4)
2017	Mechelen	2	(0)
2017–2018	Maccabi Petah Tikva	7	(0)
2018–2019	Hapoel Ashkelon	21	(4)
2020–2022	Volos	40	(1)
2023	PAS Giannina	9	(0)
2023–2024	A.E. Kifisia	9	(1)
Total		262	(21)

International career^{‡}
2006–2008	Greece U19	14	(3)
2008–2010	Greece U21	8	(2)
2008–2015	Greece	33	(3)
- * Club domestic league appearances and goals as of 15 May 2024 ‡ National team caps and goals as of 14 November 2025

Sotiris Ninis (Greek: Σωτήρης Νίνης; Albanian: Sotir Nini; born 3 April 1990) is a Greek former professional footballer who played as an attacking midfielder and a right winger. Ninis was formerly a member of the Greece national team.

== Early life ==
Ninis was born in Himara, Albania to ethnic Greek parents.

== Club career ==
=== Panathinaikos ===
Ninis began his career in 2004 as a youngster in Panathinaikos' football academies, joining from the academy of Apollon Smyrnis. On 22 December 2006, the club directors offered him a five-year contract and just two weeks after that day, on 7 January 2007, Panathinaikos coach Víctor Muñoz selected him in the main squad for the match against Egaleo at the Olympic Stadium. His outstanding performance earned him the title of the Super League Matchday MVP. He became the second youngest player ever to wear the club's shirt in a league match, at the age of sixteen (the first was Kostas Antoniou − 15-years old – in 1978). In February 2007, he officially rejected a call to play for the Albanian Under-21 national team. On 15 February 2007, Ninis became the youngest player to participate with a Greek football team in a European cup match, against Lens in France. On 18 February, Ninis lead Panathinaikos in a 4–1 win over rivals AEK Athens in the Olympic Stadium. Ninis scored one goal and assisted two others. On 6 July, Ninis signed a professional contract with Panathinaikos.

The 2007–08 season was marred by injuries and non-selection. After coming on as a substitute against Olympiacos in the first game of the season, Ninis was hit by several injuries, a hamstring injury followed by stomach muscle injuries ruled him out of action for three months. It is thought that these injuries arose due to burnout from playing too many games at a young age. He eventually returned in December, but was not part of the Panathinaikos first team for the remainder of the 2007–2008 season. This decision by Panathinaikos coach Jose Peseiro was heavily criticised by all Panathinaikos fans. Despite this, in December 2007, Ninis won the HFF Young Player of the Year, as voted by fellow players and managers. Ninis is the youngest player to have won this award.

The 2008–09 season began well for Ninis. New manager Henk ten Cate featured Ninis regularly in Panathinaikos' pre-season training. He repaid this faith through his performances against teams such as Charleroi Having entered the pitch at half-time, Ninis assisted three goals and scored one, aiding Panathiniakos to a 5–1 victory against the Belgian club. On 11 August 2008, it was revealed that ten Cate had selected Ninis to be one of the new captains of Panathinaikos, along with fellow players Dimitris Salpingidis and Gilberto Silva. Ninis is the youngest ever player to be chosen as captain of Panathinaikos, at the age of 18 years and 125 days. On 23 September 2008, Ninis extended his contract with Panathiniakos for an additional four years to 2012, with a €10 million buy-out clause into the agreement for any foreign team wanting to buy him, rising to €17 million for a Greek side.

In February 2010, Ninis made his best appearances with Panathinaikos and generally in his personal career so far in the knockout stage of the UEFA Europa League against AS Roma. That days, Roma was in great form and was second in Serie A. Having played well in the first match, in OAKA, he helped his team win 3–2. However, in Stadio Olimpico in Roma, he did better, than any other time before. He won a penalty, which Djibril Cissé converted to equalizer for Panathinaikos, then the Greek young attacking midfielder scored from 28 meters and in the stoppage time of the first half he made a great pass to Djibril Cissé, who did not have a problem to score.

In September 2011, Ninis suffered an injury and did not make his return until March.

On 20 May 2012, he played his last match with Panathinaikos in the 2011–12 Super League Greece play-offs final against AEK and was replaced by substitute Giorgos Karagounis in the 70th minute. In total, Ninis made 137 appearances for Panathinaikos, scoring 15 goals.

=== Parma ===
In March 2012, Parma president Tommaso Ghirardi announced he had signed the Greek midfielder for the summer.

After a disappointing 2012–13 season in which he only made 14 appearances for Parma, Ninis returned to his homeland on-loan to PAOK. His contract was terminated by mutual consent in August 2014.

=== Return to Panathinaikos ===
On 6 November 2014, Ninis signed a new contract with Panathinaikos for two-and-a-half years.

=== Charleroi ===
On 18 January 2016, Charleroi announced the acquisition of Sotiris Ninis for the next two years, with the attacking midfielder leaving Panathinaikos for the second time in his career.

=== Maccabi Petah Tikva and Hapoel Ashkelon ===
On 10 September 2017, Ninis signed for one year at Maccabi Petah Tikva F.C. of the Israeli Premier League as a free agent, after being released from KV Mechelen a week earlier.

In October 2018, Ninis joined Liga Leumit side Hapoel Ashkelon. On 8 October 2018, he scored on his debut after coming on as a substitute in a 2–1 win over Hapoel Kfar Saba.

=== PAS Giannina ===
On 18 November 2022, Ninis signed two-year contract with PAS Giannina.

== International career ==
=== Greece U21 ===
Ninis played with Greece national under-19 football team in the UEFA European Under-19 Football Championship in Austria, where he scored the equaliser against Germany, assisted two others and helped his team to progress to the final. Ninis was eventually selected by UEFA in the "U19 names to note", containing the best eleven players of the 2007 UEFA European Under-19 Football Championship. He was selected as the right midfielder in a 4–4–2 formation. Also he was selected by Uefa as the MVP of this tournament.

Ninis returned to duty for the Under-19 Elite qualifying round of the European Championships, after making his senior international debut. He was a key player in games against Moldova and the Netherlands, particularly impressing in the latter game. He assisted one goal, and scored the match winner from 12 yards as he kept Greece's hopes of qualification alive.

On 8 September 2009, Ninis scored the equaliser against the England U21 team in a match that finished 1–1.

=== Greece ===
Ninis was officially called up by Greece coach Otto Rehhagel on 16 May 2008 for the game against Cyprus on 19 May. This was Ninis' first ever senior call-up and offers him a chance to stake a claim for the Euro 2008 squad. Ninis, who impressed as Greece reached the final of last year's UEFA European Under-19 Championship, expressed his delight at the news, saying: "It's a dream come true and an extra motivation to work even harder and improve myself. I'm very happy."

On his debut Ninis scored the opening goal of the games versus Cyprus in the fifth minute, after a solid pass by Dimitris Salpingidis, Ninis slotted the ball underneath Antonis Georgallides and into the back of the net making the perfect debut and start for his country and becoming the youngest ever scorer for Greece with 18 years and 46 days, breaking Kostas Eleftherakis' old record by 244 days. Ninis also won the Man of the Match award for his performance. He was, however, omitted from Greece's provisional Euro 2008 squad by coach Otto Rehhagel on 20 May.

On 1 June 2010, Otto Rehhagel named his official 23-man squad for the 2010 FIFA World Cup in South Africa. Ninis made the cut despite limited appearances for Greece. He was used twice, as a substitution in the matches against Nigeria and Argentina. He is also the youngest player to have been selected by Rehhagel, at just 20 years of age.

On 2 September 2011, Ninis scored the winning goal in a qualifying match for the UEFA Euro 2012 against Israel, in Tel Aviv.

== Style of play ==
Ninis' FIFA profile states he "possesses a dizzying range of skills to go with sublime vision, an electrifying change of pace and fearsome long-range shooting skills". He normally plays centrally as a creative midfielder, but can also play on the right.

== Career statistics ==
=== Club ===
As of 11 May 2024

Appearances and goals by club, season and competition
Club	Season	League			National cup		Europe (Note: Includes Europa League, Champions League.)		Other		Total	
Club	Season	Division	Apps	Goals	Apps	Goals	Apps	Goals	Apps	Goals	Apps	Goals
Panathinaikos	2006–07	Super League Greece	14	3	5	0	2	0	0	0	21	3
Panathinaikos	2007–08	Super League Greece	4	0	0	0	1	0	4	0	9	0
Panathinaikos	2008–09	Super League Greece	22	0	1	0	4	0	0	0	27	0
Panathinaikos	2009–10	Super League Greece	26	3	5	2	11	1	0	0	42	6
Panathinaikos	2010–11	Super League Greece	24	3	3	1	3	0	0	0	30	4
Panathinaikos	2011–12	Super League Greece	10	2	0	0	4	0	0	0	14	2
Panathinaikos	Total		100	11	14	3	25	1	4	0	143	15
Parma	2012–13	Serie A	14	0	1	0	0	0	0	0	15	0
PAOK (loan)	2013–14	Super League Greece	12	0	4	0	7	1	0	0	23	1
Panathinaikos	2014–15	Super League Greece	16	0	1	1	0	0	0	0	17	1
Panathinaikos	2015–16	Super League Greece	7	0	3	1	3	0	0	0	13	1
Panathinaikos	Total		23	0	4	2	3	0	0	0	30	2
Charleroi	2015–16	Belgian Pro League	12	2	0	0	0	0	0	0	12	2
Charleroi	2016–17	Belgian Pro League	13	2	1	0	0	0	0	0	14	2
Charleroi	Total		25	4	1	0	0	0	0	0	26	4
Mechelen	2016–17	Belgian Pro League	1	0	0	0	0	0	0	0	1	0
Mechelen	2017–18	Belgian Pro League	1	0	0	0	0	0	0	0	1	0
Mechelen	Total		2	0	0	0	0	0	0	0	2	0
Maccabi Petah Tikva	2017–18	Israeli Premier League	7	0	0	0	0	0	0	0	7	0
Hapoel Ashkelon	2018–19	Liga Leumit	21	4	1	0	0	0	0	0	22	4
Volos	2020–21	Super League Greece	21	0	4	0	0	0	0	0	25	0
Volos	2021–22	Super League Greece	19	1	3	0	0	0	0	0	22	1
Volos	Total		40	1	7	0	0	0	0	0	47	1
PAS Giannina	2022–23	Super League Greece	9	0	0	0	0	0	0	0	9	0
A.E. Kifisia	2023–24	Super League Greece	9	1	0	0	0	0	0	0	9	1
Career total			262	21	31	5	35	2	4	0	333	28

=== International ===
Scores and results list Greece's goal tally first, score column indicates score after each Ninis goal.

List of international goals scored by Sotiris Ninis
No.	Date	Venue	Opponent	Score	Result	Competition
1	19 May 2008	Patras, Greece	Cyprus		2–0	Friendly
2	2 September 2011	Bloomfield Stadium, Tel Aviv, Israel	Israel		1–0	UEFA Euro 2012 qualification
3	11 September 2012	Pireaus, Greece	Lithuania		2–0	UEFA Euro 2012 qualifying

== Honours ==
=== Panathinaikos ===
- Super League Greece: 2009–10
- Greek Cup: 2009–10

=== Individual ===
- Greek Young Footballer of the year: 2007, 2010
- Named in UEFA U-19 European Championships 2007 "Names to Note"; the best 11 players of the tournament.
- UEFA U-19 European Championships Silver medal (Greece).
- UEFA U-19 European Championships MVP
- Youngest scorer in history of Greece national team
- Youngest scorer of Panathinaikos
