= Cleyton (footballer, born 1983) =

Brazilian footballer

Personal information
- Full name: Cleyton Alexandre Henrique Silva
- Date of birth: 8 March 1983 (age 43)
- Place of birth: Jacareí, São Paulo, Brazil
- Height: 1.75 m (5 ft 9 in)
- Position: Attacking midfielder

Youth career
- Fluminense

Senior career*
Years	Team	Apps	(Gls)
- Jacareí (SP)
2002–2003	Messiniakos	15	(7)
2003–2006	Apollon Kalamarias	81	(33)
2006–2008	AEL	54	(9)
2008–2012	Panathinaikos	64	(12)
2010	→ Metalurh Donetsk (loan)	9	(1)
2012–2014	Kayserispor	43	(5)
2014	Dinamo Zagreb	6	(1)
2014–2015	Skoda Xanthi	25	(10)
2015–2016	Elazığspor	14	(2)
2016	Göztepe	11	(2)
2016–2017	Omonia	33	(8)
2017–2018	Ümraniyespor	32	(1)
2018–2019	Iraklis	23	(4)
- * Club domestic league appearances and goals

Cleyton Alexandre Henrique Silva (born 8 March 1983) is a Brazilian former professional footballer who played as an attacking midfielder.

== Career ==
Cleyton is one of few footballers in Greece to have a dual passport, one of Brazilian and one of Greek which he received on 13 November 2009, after spending seven years in Greece, making him eligible to gain Greek citizenship. On 19 September 2004, he made his debut in the Super League Greece in a 1–0 home of his club (Apollon Kalamarias) win against OFI.

=== AEL ===
In the 2006–07 season Cleyton helped AEL reach the Greek cup final and win it. He was the club's top scorer in European competitions in the 2007–08 season, including goals against Blackburn Rovers and Everton.

=== Panathinaikos ===
Cleyton signed for Panathinaikos in the summer of 2008 for a fee of €1,700,000.

Cleyton started the 2011–12 season well, scoring very important goals for the greens such as a direct free kick against PAOK and a fantastic overhead kick against Levadiakos.

=== Dinamo Zagreb ===
On 22 January 2014, Cleyton signed for Dinamo Zagreb after his former Kayserispor manager Robert Prosinečki recommended him to the club. On 28 March 2014, it was reported by the club that the two parties had mutually agreed to terminate the player's contract as a result of misconduct not tolerated by the club. Croatian media reported that Cleyton provoked and engaged in a fight at a Zagreb night club in the early morning hours of 27 March 2014 while heavily under the influence of alcohol.

=== Skoda Xanthi ===
On 2 September 2014, Cleyton signed a one-year contract for Skoda Xanthi for an undisclosed fee. On 20 September 2014, he made his debut with the club in a 2–0 home win against Levadiakos.

On 29 April 2015, Xanthi succeeded to reach the Cup final for the first time in its history after a 0–0 draw with Iraklis. Cleyton Silva has twice won the Greek Cup, one with AEL in 2007 and one with Panathinaikos in 2010.

On 3 May 2015 in a 0–0 home draw against Asteras Tripolis where he lost a penalty Cleyton reached 200 appearances in Greek Super League.

=== Elazığspor and Göztepe ===
On 7 August 2015, despite numerous offer from Greek clubs, Cleyton decided to continue his career in Turkey signing a two years' contract for TFF First League club Elazığspor for an undisclosed fee. Due to financial problems, and after the first half of the season, Cleyton decided to return to Greece to play for Iraklis, that seemed to be the proper club to continue his career.

Cleyton, who was a transfer target of Atromitos and Iraklis, chose to remain in Turkey and continue his career at Göztepe. The 33-year-old former player of Panathinaikos was then released by Elazigspor, but selected not to return in Greece, where he has spent the biggest part of his career.

=== Omonia Nicosia ===
On 18 June 2016, Cleyton signed a contract with Cypriot club Omonia Nicosia. He appeared in 41 games and scored 10 goals. On 26 May 2017 the club announced that Cleyton was released under a mutual agreement with the footballer.

=== Return to Turkey ===
On 5 July 2017, Cleyton signed a one-year contract with TFF First League club Ümraniyespor for an undisclosed fee.

=== Iraklis ===
On 7 September 2018, Cleyton joined Iraklis of the Football League on a free transfer.

== Career statistics ==
As of 25 June 2019

Appearances and goals by club, season and competition
Club	Season	League		Cup		Continental^{[A]}		Others^{[B]}		Total	
Club	Season	Apps	Goals	Apps	Goals	Apps	Goals	Apps	Goals	Apps	Goals
Apollon Kalamarias	2003–04	24	15	0	0	–		0	0	24	15
Apollon Kalamarias	2004–05	28	9	6	0	–		0	0	34	9
Apollon Kalamarias	2005–06	29	9	3	0	–		0	0	32	9
Apollon Kalamarias	Total	81	33	9	0	0	0	0	0	90	33
AEL	2006–07	26	2	7	0	–		–		33	2
AEL	2007–08	28	7	4	1	6	3	–		38	11
AEL	Total	54	9	11	1	6	3	0	0	71	13
Panathinaikos	2008–09	22	6	4	1	5	0	–		31	7
Panathinaikos	2009–10	4	0	3	2	0	0	–		7	2
Panathinaikos	2010–11	6	0	0	0	0	0	–		6	0
Panathinaikos	2011–12	31	6	0	0	2	0	–		33	6
Panathinaikos	Total	63	12	7	3	7	0	0	0	77	15
Metalurh Donetsk (loan)	2010–11	9	1	1	0	–		–		10	1
Kayserispor	2012–13	32	5	1	1	–		–		33	6
Kayserispor	2013–14	11	0	3	1	–		–		14	1
Kayserispor	Total	43	5	4	2	0	0	0	0	47	7
Dinamo Zagreb	2013–14	6	1	2	0	–		–		8	1
Skoda Xanthi	2014–15	25	10	10	2	–		–		35	12
Elazığspor	2015–16	14	2	0	0	–		–		14	2
Göztepe	2015–16	11	2	0	0	–		–		11	2
Omonia	2016–17	33	8	4	1	4	1	–		41	10
Ümraniyespor	2017–18	32	1	0	0	–		–		32	1
Iraklis	2018–19	23	4	4	2	–		–		27	6
Career total		394	88	53	10	17	4	0	0	463	103

== Honours ==
AEL

- Greek Cup: 2006–07

Panathinaikos

- Super League Greece: 2009–10
- Greek Cup: 2009–10

Individual

- Super League Greece Team of the Season: 2014–15
