= Nikos Spyropoulos =

Greek footballer

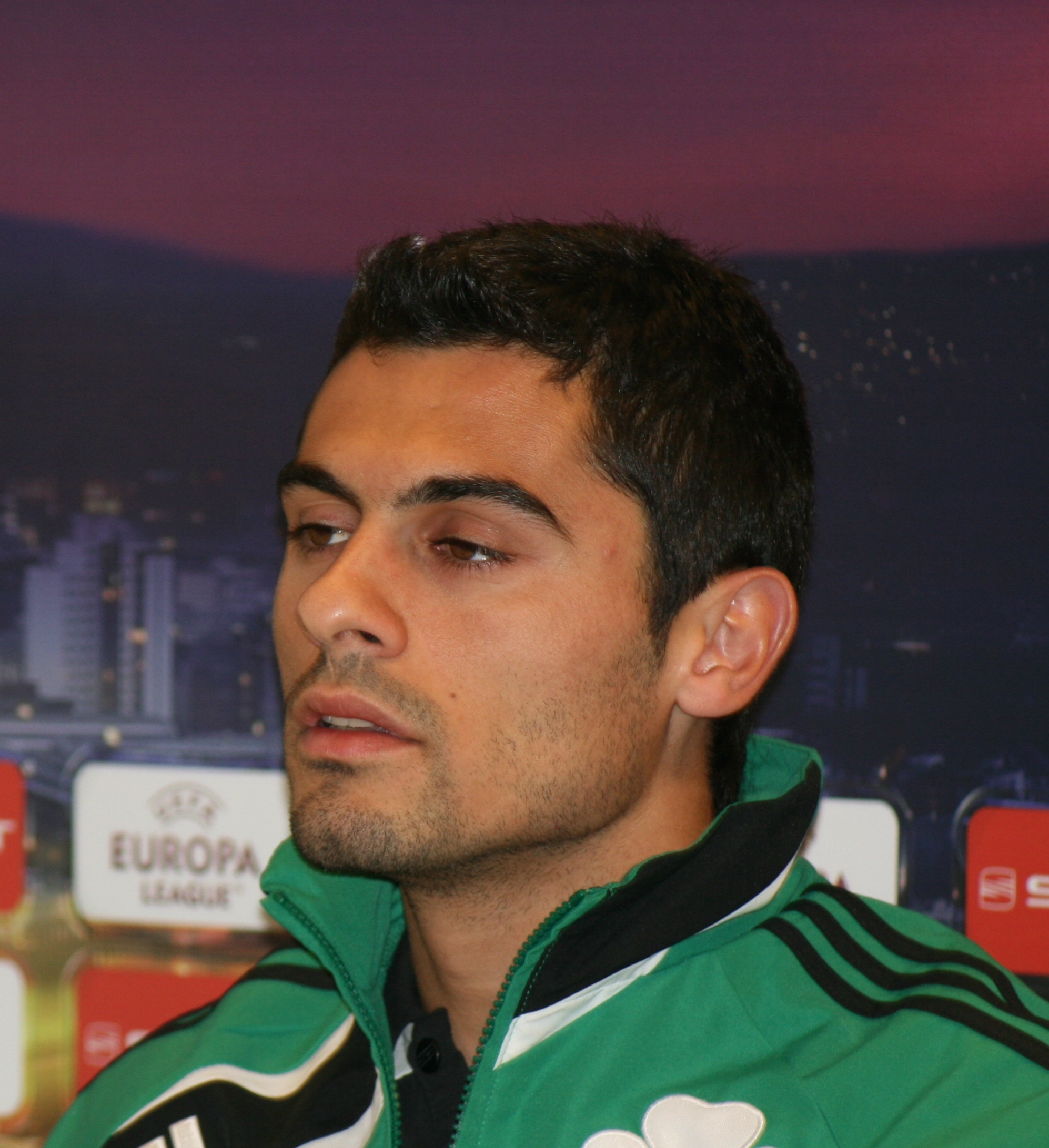
- Spyropoulos with Panathinaikos, 2009

Personal information
- Full name: Nikolaos Spyropoulos
- Date of birth: 10 October 1983 (age 43)
- Place of birth: Ioannina, Greece
- Height: 1.72 m (5 ft 8 in)
- Position: Left-back

Senior career*
Years	Team	Apps	(Gls)
2001–2004	PAS Giannina	33	(1)
2004–2008	Panionios	68	(1)
2008–2013	Panathinaikos	128	(1)
2013	Chievo Verona	2	(0)
2013–2015	PAOK	19	(0)
Total		250	(3)

International career
2007–2013	Greece	35	(2)
- * Club domestic league appearances and goals

Nikos Spyropoulos (Greek: Νίκος Σπυρόπουλος; born 10 October 1983) is a Greek former professional footballer who played as a left-back.

== Club career ==
=== Early career ===
Spyropoulos began his career with PAS Giannina in 2001, where he celebrated a promotion to the Alpha Ethniki during his first season. In three years, he made a total of 33 appearances for the club, all of which in the Beta Ethniki.

=== Panionios ===
In summer 2004 he signed for Super League Greece side Panionios. Eight months later, and while he was about to be transferred to Panathinaikos along with his teammates Alexandros Tziolis and Evangelos Mantzios, he tested positive for elevated testosterone and was initially suspended for two years. This was later attributed to natural causes, but his transfer was cancelled nevertheless. He returned to action one year later and went on to play for 3.5 years for Panionios, earning the reputation of being one of the best left-backs in the Greek championship.

During the summer transfer period of 2007 and the winter period of 2008, Spyropoulos attracted the interest of clubs such as AEK Athens, Olympiacos and Werder Bremen – however a move did not materialize.

=== Panathinaikos ===
In January 2008, Spyropoulos moved to Panathinaikos for a reported fee of €2 million Εuros.

After some impressive displays during the second half of 2007–08 season, Spyropoulos has started the 2008–09 season as the main left back for Panathinaikos. Henk Ten Cate, the manager had praised his ability by asking a "Spyropoulos for the right side" too, during the pre-season. Spyropoulos main assets are his speed, stamina and the ability to go forward whenever possible. Due to a clause he was not able to play against his previous team Panionios for two years after his transfer to Panathinaikos.

=== Chievo Verona ===
Two days before the winter transfer window closed Spyropoulos signed for Serie A side A.C. Chievo Verona. He made two appearances for the club before missing the remainder of the season through injury.

=== PAOK ===
An announcement on PAOK's official Twitter profile confirmed the acquisition of Spyropoulos. He made his debut with the club in December 2013 in a 2–0 away win against PAS Giannina. On 15 April 2015, his contract was terminated.

== International career ==
On 17 November 2007, Spyropoulos made his Greece national team debut in the 5–0 Euro 2008 qualifier defeat of Malta coming on for Vasilis Torosidis in the 46th minute.

== Career statistics ==
=== Club ===
As of 3 January 2015

Appearances and goals by club, season and competition
Club	Season	League (Note: Includes Super League Greece (Alpha Ethniki until 2006) and Beta Ethniki.)			Cup (Note: Includes Greek Football Cup.)		Continental (Note: Includes UEFA Champions League and UEFA Europa League (UEFA Cup until 2009).)		Others (Note: Includes Super League Greece play-offs.)		Total	
Club	Season	Division	Apps	Goals	Apps	Goals	Apps	Goals	Apps	Goals	Apps	Goals
PAS Giannina	2001–02	Football League	6	0	–		–		–		6	0
PAS Giannina	2002–03	Super League Greece	0	0	–		–		–		0	0
PAS Giannina	2003–04	Football League	27	1	1	0	–		–		28	1
PAS Giannina	Total		33	1	1	0	0	0	0	0	34	1
Panionios	2004–05	Super League Greece	16	0	1	0	3	0	–		20	0
Panionios	2005–06	Super League Greece	11	0	–		–		–		11	0
Panionios	2006–07	Super League Greece	24	1	1	0	–		–		25	1
Panionios	2007–08	Super League Greece	17	0	1	0	4	0	–		22	0
Panionios	Total		68	1	3	0	7	0	0	0	78	1
Panathinaikos	2007–08	Super League Greece	10	0	–		–		–		10	0
Panathinaikos	2008–09	Super League Greece	30	0	3	0	10	0	–		43	0
Panathinaikos	2009–10	Super League Greece	25	0	1	0	10	0	–		36	0
Panathinaikos	2010–11	Super League Greece	22	1	3	0	5	0	2	0	32	1
Panathinaikos	2011–12	Super League Greece	24	0	1	0	9	0	2	0	36	0
Panathinaikos	2012–13	Super League Greece	17	0	1	0	9	0	–		27	0
Panathinaikos	Total		128	1	9	0	43	0	4	0	184	1
Chievo	2012–13	Serie A	2	0	0	0	–		–		2	0
PAOK	2013–14	Super League Greece	13	0	2	0	–		–		15	0
PAOK	2014–15	Super League Greece	6	0	1	0	3	0	–		10	0
PAOK	Total		19	0	3	0	3	0	0	0	25	0
Career total			250	3	16	0	53	0	4	0	323	3

=== International ===
Scores and results list Greece's goal tally first, score column indicates score after each Spyropoulos goal.

List of international goals scored by Nikos Spyropoulos
No.	Date	Venue	Opponent	Score	Result	Competition
1	3 September 2010	Piraeus, Greece	Georgia		1–1	UEFA Euro 2012 qualifying
2	7 September 2012	Riga, Latvia	Latvia		2–1	2014 FIFA World Cup qualification

== Honours ==
Panathinaikos

- Super League Greece: 2009–10
- Greek Cup: 2009–10

PAOK

- Greek Cup runner-up: 2013–14
