= 2002–03 Panathinaikos F.C. season =

Panathinaikos
2002–03 season
- Owner: Giannis Vardinogiannis
- Chairman: Angelos Filippidis
- Manager: Fernando Santos (until 16 October); Sergio Markarián (from 22 October)
- Ground: Leoforos Alexandras Stadium
- Alpha Ethniki: 2nd
- Greek Cup: Second round
- UEFA Cup: Quarter-finals
- Top goalscorer: League: Nikos Liberopoulos (16); All: Nikos Liberopoulos (20)
| Home colours | Away colours |

In the 2002–03 season Panathinaikos played for 44th consecutive time in Greece's top division, Alpha Ethniki. They also competed in UEFA Cup and Greek Cup. Their season started with Sergio Markarián as team manager.

== Players ==
=== First-team squad ===
Squad at end of season

Note: Flags indicate national team as defined under FIFA eligibility rules; some limited exceptions apply. Players may hold more than one non-FIFA nationality.

| No. | Pos. | Nation | Player |
|---|---|---|---|
| 1 | GK | GRE | Antonis Nikopolidis |
| 2 | DF | DEN | Rene Henriksen |
| 4 | MF | POR | Carlos Chaínho |
| 5 | DF | GRE | Giourkas Seitaridis |
| 6 | MF | ROU | Erik Lincar |
| 7 | FW | CRO | Goran Vlaovic |
| 8 | DF | GRE | Yannis Goumas (captain) |
| 9 | FW | POL | Krzysztof Warzycha |
| 10 | MF | GHA | Derek Boateng |
| 11 | FW | FIN | Joonas Kolkka |
| 12 | MF | DEN | Jan Michaelsen |
| 13 | GK | GRE | Stefanos Kotsolis |
| 14 | DF | GRE | Leonidas Vokolos |

| No. | Pos. | Nation | Player |
|---|---|---|---|
| 15 | MF | CRO | Daniel Šarić |
| 16 | DF | GRE | Sotiris Kyrgiakos |
| 18 | DF | GRE | Minas Pitsos |
| 19 | FW | CYP | Michalis Konstantinou |
| 20 | MF | GRE | Angelos Basinas |
| 21 | FW | GRE | Nikos Liberopoulos |
| 22 | MF | GRE | Miltiadis Sapanis |
| 23 | FW | NGA | Emmanuel Olisadebe |
| 24 | MF | GRE | Xenofon Gittas |
| 26 | MF | GRE | Giorgos Karagounis |
| 27 | DF | GRE | Pantelis Konstantinidis |
| 30 | DF | GRE | Takis Fyssas |
| 31 | GK | GRE | Panagiotis Bartzokas |

== Team kit ==
| Home | Away | Home (2) | Away (2) |

== Competitions ==
=== Alpha Ethniki ===
==== League table ====
| Pos | Team | Pld | W | D | L | GF | GA | GD | Pts | Qualification or relegation |
|---|---|---|---|---|---|---|---|---|---|---|
| 1 | Olympiacos (C) | 30 | 21 | 7 | 2 | 75 | 21 | +54 | 70 (Note: Head-to-head points (goal difference): Olympiacos 3 (+2), Panathinaikos 3 (-2).) | Qualification for Champions League group stage |
| 2 | Panathinaikos | 30 | 22 | 4 | 4 | 50 | 19 | +31 | 70 | Qualification for Champions League group stage |
| 3 | AEK Athens | 30 | 21 | 5 | 4 | 74 | 29 | +45 | 68 | Qualification for Champions League third qualifying round |
| 4 | PAOK | 30 | 16 | 5 | 9 | 59 | 38 | +21 | 53 (Note: Head-to-head points (goal difference): PAOK 3 (+1), Panionios 3 (-1).) | Qualification for UEFA Cup first round |
| 5 | Panionios | 30 | 15 | 8 | 7 | 35 | 25 | +10 | 53 | Qualification for UEFA Cup first round |

Source: Galanis Sports Data
Rules for classification: 1) Points; 2) Head-to-head points; 3) Head-to-head goal difference; 4) Goal difference; 5) Goals scored; 6) Goals against; 7) Play-offs (neutral ground); 8) Draw.
(Note: Criterion 7 is only used if needed to decide champion, teams for relegation or teams for UEFA competitions).
(C) Champions

==== Matches ====
| 25 August 2002 1 | PAOK | 4–1 | Panathinaikos | Thessaloniki |
| 21:00 | Georgiadis 9', 23' (pen.); Spasić 41'; Henriksen 58' (o.g.) | | Yiasoumi 33' (o.g.) | Stadium: Toumba Stadium; Attendance: 26,800; Referee: Georgios Tsagarakis |

| 1 September 2002 2 | Panathinaikos | 0–1 | Proodeftiki | Ampelokipoi |
| 18:00 | | | Poulopoulos 6' | Stadium: Leoforos Alexandras Stadium; Attendance: Behind closed doors Referee: Giannis Kaminaris |

| 14 September 2002 3 | AEK Athens | 1–0 | Panathinaikos | Nea Filadelfeia |
| 19:00 | Ivić 41' | | | Stadium: Nikos Goumas Stadium; Attendance: 13,801; Referee: Giorgos Douros |

| 22 September 2002 4 | Ionikos | 0–1 | Panathinaikos | Nikaia |
| 20:30 | | | Basinas 60' (pen.) | Stadium: Neapoli Municipal Stadium; Attendance: 3,910; Referee: Charalampos Patras |

| 27 October 2002 5 | Panathinaikos | 3–2 | Aris | Ampelokipoi |
| 18:00 | Liberopoulos 5'; Basinas 18'; Konstantinou 32' | | Seitaridis 16' (o.g.); Šimić 58' | Stadium: Leoforos Alexandras Stadium; Attendance: Behind closed doors Referee: Giannis Kaminaris |

| 3 November 2002 6 | Panachaiki | 0–3 | Panathinaikos | Patras |
| 15:00 | | | Karagounis 10', 90+2'; Konstantinidis 35' | Stadium: Kostas Davourlis Stadium; Attendance: 3,000; Referee: Emmanouil Tapatzas |

| 10 November 2002 7 | Panathinaikos | 1–0 | Panionios | Ampelokipoi |
| 17:00 | Liberopoulos 15' | | | Stadium: Leoforos Alexandras Stadium; Attendance: 6,320; Referee: Georgios Tsagarakis |

| 24 November 2002 8 | Egaleo | 0–0 | Panathinaikos | Egaleo |
| 17:00 | | | | Stadium: Stavros Mavrothalassitis Stadium; Attendance: 3,280; Referee: Fragiskos Somarakis |

| 1 December 2002 9 | Panathinaikos | 1–0 | PAS Giannina | Ampelokipoi |
| 17:00 | Basinas 45+1' | | | Stadium: Leoforos Alexandras Stadium; Attendance: 4,391; Referee: Georgios Douros |

| 8 December 2002 10 | Panathinaikos | 2–0 | Iraklis | Ampelokipoi |
| 19:00 | Olisadebe 31', 43' | | | Stadium: Leoforos Alexandras Stadium; Attendance: 10,057; Referee: Iraklis Tsikinis |

| 15 December 2002 11 | Skoda Xanthi | 0–0 | Panathinaikos | Xanthi |
| 17:00 | | | | Stadium: A.O. Xanthi Stadium; Attendance: 3,922; Referee: Charalampos Karatzas |

| 22 December 2002 12 | Panathinaikos | 1–0 | Kallithea | Ampelokipoi |
| 19:00 | Warzycha 90+3' | | | Stadium: Leoforos Alexandras Stadium; Attendance: 7,021; Referee: Georgios Borovilos |

| 5 January 2003 13 | OFI | 0–2 | Panathinaikos | Heraklion |
| 19:00 | | | Adamos 24' (o.g.); Karagounis 30' | Stadium: Theodoros Vardinogiannis Stadium; Attendance: 6,690; Referee: Giannis Bisogiannis |

| 12 January 2003 14 | Panathinaikos | 3–2 | Olympiacos | Ampelokipoi |
| 19:00 | Olisadebe 18'; Basinas 72'; Kolkka 77' | | Henriksen 9' (o.g.); Kyrgiakos 55' (o.g.) | Stadium: Leoforos Alexandras Stadium; Attendance: 13,171; Referee: Kyros Vassaras |

| 19 January 2003 15 | Akratitos | 1–3 | Panathinaikos | Ano Liosia |
| 19:00 | Stefanidis 6' | | Michaelsen 15'; Liberopoulos 22'; Konstantinou 25' | Stadium: Giannis Pathiakakis Stadium; Attendance: 2,696; Referee: Giannis Kaminaris |

| 26 January 2003 16 | Panathinaikos | 1–0 | PAOK | Ampelokipoi |
| 19:00 | Liberopoulos 52' | | | Stadium: Leoforos Alexandras Stadium; Attendance: 13,620; Referee: Georgios Borovilos |

| 2 February 2003 17 | Proodeftiki | 0–2 | Panathinaikos | Nikaia |
| 19:00 | | | Liberopoulos 72', 74' | Stadium: Nikaia Municipal Stadium; Attendance: 2,917; Referee: Athanassios Briakos |

| 9 February 2003 18 | Panathinaikos | 2–1 | AEK Athens | Ampelokipoi |
| 19:15 | Liberopoulos 33'; Basinas 71' (pen.) | | Maladenis 37' | Stadium: Leoforos Alexandras Stadium; Attendance: 12,439; Referee: Kyros Vassaras |

| 16 February 2003 19 | Panathinaikos | 1–0 | Ionikos | Ampelokipoi |
| 19:00 | Liberopoulos 47' | | | Stadium: Leoforos Alexandras Stadium; Attendance: 7,440; Referee: Christos Trikalis |

| 23 February 2003 20 | Aris | 1–3 | Panathinaikos | Thessaloniki |
| 16:45 | Demba-Nyrén 89' | | Liberopoulos 6', 45+1'; Olisadebe 65' | Stadium: Aris Stadium; Attendance: 8,559; Referee: Ioannis Spiropoulos |

| 2 March 2003 21 | Panathinaikos | 2–0 | Panachaiki | Ampelokipoi |
| 16:45 | Konstantinidis 5'; Olisadebe 21' | | | Stadium: Leoforos Alexandras Stadium; Attendance: 10,510; Referee: Charalampos Karatzas |

| 9 March 2003 22 | Panionios | 0–0 | Panathinaikos | Nea Smyrni |
| 16:45 | | | | Stadium: Nea Smyrni Stadium; Attendance: 6,229; Referee: Christoforos Zografos |

| 16 March 2003 23 | Panathinaikos | 3–0 | Egaleo | Ampelokipoi |
| 19:00 | Olisadebe 43', 61'; Liberopoulos 74' | | | Stadium: Leoforos Alexandras Stadium; Attendance: 11,385; Referee: Avraam Kemparidis |

| 23 March 2003 24 | PAS Giannina | 0–0 | Panathinaikos | Ioannina |
| 19:30 | | | | Stadium: Zosimades Stadium; Attendance: 4,168; Referee: Ioannis Spiropoulos |

| 6 April 2003 25 | Iraklis | 0–3 | Panathinaikos | Thessaloniki |
| 20:00 | | | Konstantinou 61', 76'; Liberopoulos 70' | Stadium: Makedonikos Stadium; Attendance: 4,289; Referee: Georgios Tsagarakis |

| 13 April 2003 26 | Panathinaikos | 1–0 | Skoda Xanthi | Ampelokipoi |
| 20:00 | Warzycha 73' | | | Stadium: Leoforos Alexandras Stadium; Attendance: 8,170; Referee: Iraklis Tsikinis |

| 20 April 2003 27 | Kallithea | 1–3 | Panathinaikos | Kallithea |
| 17:30 | Koulakiotis 87' | | Liberopoulos 48'; Olisadebe 69'; Vlaović 81' | Stadium: Grigoris Lambrakis Stadium; Attendance: 1,935; Referee: Nikos Aggelakis |

| 4 May 2003 28 | Panathinaikos | 5–1 | OFI | Ampelokipoi |
| 18:00 | Vlaović 15'; Liberopoulos 17', 49' (pen.), 64'; Konstantinidis 75' | | Dermitzakis 90' | Stadium: Leoforos Alexandras Stadium; Attendance: 15,065; Referee: Iraklis Tsikinis |

| 11 May 2003 29 | Olympiacos | 3–0 | Panathinaikos | Rizoupoli |
| 20:00 | Giovanni 3'; Giannakopoulos 15', 47' | | | Stadium: Rizoupoli Stadium; Attendance: 10,825; Referee: Georgios Borovilos |

| 25 May 2003 30 | Panathinaikos | 3–1 | Akratitos | Ampelokipoi |
| 18:30 | Sapanis 18'; Konstantinou 28'; Warzycha 90' | | Koutsokostas 34' | Stadium: Leoforos Alexandras Stadium; Attendance: 1,701; Referee: Athanassios Briakos |

=== Greek Cup ===
==== First round ====
| 10 August 2002 First leg | ILTEX Lykoi | 0–2 | Panathinaikos | Thessaloniki |
| 13:00 EEST | | Report (page 4) | Konstantinidis 16'; Konstantinou 32' | Stadium: Stelios Iliadis Stadium; Referee: Manolis Tapatzas (Thrace) |

| 18 August 2002 Second leg | Panathinaikos | 3–0 (5–0 agg.) | ILTEX Lykoi | Ampelokipoi |
| 13:00 EEST | Liberopoulos 49'; Warzycha 66'; Vlaović 73' | Report (page 10) | | Stadium: Leoforos Alexandras Stadium; Referee: Giannis Tsachilidis (Piraeus) |

==== Second round ====
| 7 October 2002 First leg | Panathinaikos | 1–0 | Skoda Xanthi | Ampelokipoi |
| 18:00 EEST | Liberopoulos 4' | Report (page 13) | | Stadium: Leoforos Alexandras Stadium; Referee: Nikos Angelakis (Thessaloniki) |

| 6 November 2002 Second leg | Skoda Xanthi | 0–0 (0–1 agg.) | Panathinaikos | Xanthi |
| 17:00 EET | | Report (page 15) | | Stadium: A.O. Xanthi Stadium; Referee: Kyros Vassaras (Thessaloniki) |

==== Round of 16 ====
| 18 December 2002 First leg | Akratitos | 0–1 | Panathinaikos | Ano Liosia |
| 19:00 EET | | Report (page 19) | Olisadebe 46' | Stadium: Giannis Pathiakakis Stadium; Referee: Ioannis Tsacheilidis (Piraeus) |

| 15 January 2003 Second leg | Panathinaikos | 3–0 (4–0 agg.) | Akratitos | Ampelokipoi |
| 19:30 EET | Konstantinou 45'; Vlaović 52'; Warzycha 65' | Report (page 20) | | Stadium: Leoforos Alexandras Stadium; Referee: Christoforos Zografos (Athens) |

==== Quarter-finals ====
| 5 February 2003 First leg | Panathinaikos | 0–1 | Egaleo | Ampelokipoi |
| 19:00 EET | | Report (page 21) | Chloros 84' | Stadium: Leoforos Alexandras Stadium; Attendance: 1,663; Referee: Ioannis Spyropoulos (Phthiotis) |

| 5 March 2003 Second leg | Egaleo | 1–1 (2–1 agg.) | Panathinaikos | Aigaleo |
| 17:00 EET | Agritis 43' | Report (page 22) | Sapanis 5' | Stadium: Stavros Mavrothalassitis Stadium; Attendance: 1,295; Referee: Vasilis Terovitsas (Aetoloacarnania) |

=== UEFA Cup ===
==== First round ====
| 19 September 2002 First leg | Litex Lovech (Bulgaria) | 0–1 | (Greece) Panathinaikos | Lovech, Bulgaria |
| 15:45 CET | | Report | Jelenković 72' (o.g.) | Stadium: Lovech Stadium; Attendance: 8,000; Referee: Espen Berntsen (Norway) |

| 3 October 2002 Second leg | Panathinaikos (Greece) | 2–1 (a.e.t.) (3–1 agg.) | (Bulgaria) Litex Lovech | Athens, Greece |
| 20:30 CET | Warzycha 110', 120' | Report | Graf 90+1' | Stadium: Leoforos Alexandras Stadium; Attendance: 15,000; Referee: Bertrand Layec (France) |

==== Second round ====
| 31 October 2002 First leg | Fenerbahçe (Turkey) | 1–1 | (Greece) Panathinaikos | Istanbul, Turkey |
| 19:15 CET | Washington 42' | Report | Basinas 14' | Stadium: Şükrü Saracoğlu Stadium; Attendance: 50,000; Referee: Pasquale Rodomonti (Italy) |

| 14 November 2002 Second leg | Panathinaikos (Greece) | 4–1 (5–2 agg.) | (Turkey) Fenerbahçe | Athens, Greece |
| 20:00 CET | Liberopoulos 24'; Goumas 31'; Michaelsen 42'; Warzycha 89' | Report | Tuncay 37' | Stadium: Leoforos Alexandras Stadium; Attendance: 7,040; Referee: Fernando Carmona Méndez (Spain) |

==== Third round ====
| 28 November 2002 First leg | Slovan Liberec (Czech Republic) | 2–2 | (Greece) Panathinaikos | Liberec, Czech Republic |
| 18:30 CET | Zbončák 44'; Slovák 84' (pen.) | Report | Basinas 13' (pen.); Olisadebe 52' | Stadium: Stadion u Nisy; Attendance: 5,805; Referee: Mike Riley (England) |

| 12 December 2002 Second leg | Panathinaikos (Greece) | 1–0 (3–2 agg.) | (Czech Republic) Slovan Liberec | Athens, Greece |
| 17:45 CET | Fyssas 2' | Report | | Stadium: Leoforos Alexandras Stadium; Attendance: 13,300; Referee: Éric Poulat (France) |

==== Fourth round ====
| 20 February 2003 First leg | Panathinaikos (Greece) | 3–0 | (Belgium) Anderlecht | Athens, Greece |
| 19:30 CET | Olisadebe 12', 73'; Liberopoulos 63' | Report | | Stadium: Leoforos Alexandras Stadium; Attendance: 16,000; Referee: Manuel Mejuto González (Spain) |

| 27 February 2003 Second leg | Anderlecht (Belgium) | 2–0 (2–3 agg.) | (Greece) Panathinaikos | Brussels, Belgium |
| 20:30 CET | Jestrović 70', 81' | Report | | Stadium: Constant Vanden Stock Stadium; Attendance: 17,970; Referee: Herbert Fandel (Germany) |

==== Quarter-finals ====
| 13 March 2003 First leg | Porto (Portugal) | 0–1 | (Greece) Panathinaikos | Porto, Portugal |
| 22:00 CET | | Report | Olisadebe 73' | Stadium: Estádio das Antas; Attendance: 44,310; Referee: Domenico Messina (Italy) |

| 20 March 2003 Second leg | Panathinaikos (Greece) | 0–2 (a.e.t.) (1–2 agg.) | (Portugal) Porto | Athens, Greece |
| 19:30 CET | | Report | Derlei 16', 103' | Stadium: Leoforos Alexandras Stadium; Attendance: 14,300; Referee: René Temmink (Netherlands) |
