= 2003–04 Panathinaikos F.C. season =

Panathinaikos
2003–04 season
- Owner: Giannis Vardinogiannis
- Chairman: Argiris Mitsou
- Manager: Itzhak Shum
- Ground: Leoforos Alexandras Stadium
- Alpha Ethniki: Winners
- Greek Cup: Winners
- Champions League: Group Stage
- UEFA Cup: Round of 32
- Top goalscorer: League: Dimitrios Papadopoulos (17); All: Dimitrios Papadopoulos (20)
- Highest home attendance: 13,718 vs. Rangers (1 October 2003)
- Lowest home attendance: 2,301 vs. OFI (17 December 2003)
- Average home league attendance: 8,330
Home colours	Away colours	Third colours

In the 2003–04 season Panathinaikos played for 45th consecutive time in Greece's top division, Alpha Ethniki. They also competed in UEFA Champions League, UEFA Cup and Greek Cup.

== Players ==
=== First-team squad ===
Squad at end of season

Note: Flags indicate national team as defined under FIFA eligibility rules; some limited exceptions apply. Players may hold more than one non-FIFA nationality.

No.	Pos.	Nation	Player
1	GK	GRE	Antonis Nikopolidis
2	DF	DEN	René Henriksen
3	DF	RSA	Nasief Morris
4	MF	CRO	Silvio Marić
5	DF	GRE	Giourkas Seitaridis
6	DF	GER	Markus Münch
7	FW	CRO	Goran Vlaović
8	DF	GRE	Giannis Goumas (captain)
9	FW	POL	Krzysztof Warzycha
10	FW	CMR	Joël Epalle
11	FW	GRE	Dimitrios Papadopoulos
12	GK	GRE	Kostas Chalkias
14	DF	LTU	Raimondas Žutautas
15	FW	GAM	Njogu Demba-Nyrén

No.	Pos.	Nation	Player
16	DF	GRE	Sotirios Kyrgiakos
18	MF	ROU	Lucian Sânmărtean
19	FW	CYP	Michalis Konstantinou
20	MF	GRE	Angelos Basinas
21	DF	GRE	Ilias Kotsios
22	MF	GRE	Miltiadis Sapanis
23	FW	POL	Emmanuel Olisadebe
24	DF	CZE	Loukas Vyntra
25	GK	GRE	Stefanos Kotsolis
27	DF	GRE	Pantelis Konstantinidis
30	DF	GRE	Takis Fyssas
31	GK	GRE	Alexandros Tzorvas
35	MF	DEN	Jan Michaelsen
40	FW	ARG	Ezequiel González

== Team kit ==
Home	Away	Third

== Competitions ==
=== Alpha Ethniki ===
==== League table ====
Pos	Team	Pld	W	D	L	GF	GA	GD	Pts	Qualification or relegation
1	Panathinaikos (C)	30	24	5	1	62	18	+44	77	Qualification for Champions League group stage
2	Olympiacos	30	24	3	3	70	19	+51	75	Qualification for Champions League group stage
3	PAOK	30	18	6	6	47	27	+20	60	Qualification for Champions League third qualifying round
4	AEK Athens	30	16	7	7	57	32	+25	55	Qualification for UEFA Cup first round
5	Egaleo	30	15	7	8	37	26	+11	52	Qualification for UEFA Cup first round

Source: Galanis Sports Data
Rules for classification: 1st points; 2nd head-to-head points; 3rd head-to-head goal difference; 4th decision match.
(C) Champions

==== Matches ====
24 August 2003 1	Panathinaikos	1–0	Skoda Xanthi	Ampelokipoi
21:15	Konstantinidis 84'			Stadium: Leoforos Alexandras Stadium; Attendance: 13,146; Referee: Athanassios Briakos

31 August 2003 2	OFI	1–3	Panathinaikos	Heraklion
19:15	Kotsios 16'		Konstantinou 10'; Papadopoulos 58', 70'	Stadium: Theodoros Vardinogiannis Stadium; Attendance: 7,059; Referee: Dimitris Kalopoulos

13 September 2003 3	Panathinaikos	3–1	Kallithea	Ampelokipoi
21:00	Fyssas 5'; Papadopoulos 41'; Žutautas 90+3'		Kyriakos 56'	Stadium: Leoforos Alexandras Stadium; Attendance: 10,526; Referee: Michalis Germanakos

21 September 2003 4	AEK Athens	2–2	Panathinaikos	Nea Smyrni
21:00	Georgatos 43', 88'		Kyrgiakos 20'; Fyssas 28'	Stadium: Nea Smyrni Stadium; Attendance: 9,472; Referee: Makis Efthimiadis

27 September 2003 5	Panathinaikos	2–0	Ionikos	Ampelokipoi
21:00	Vlaović 83'; Konstantinou 86'			Stadium: Leoforos Alexandras Stadium; Attendance: 8,131; Referee: Ioannis Spiropoulos

5 October 2003 6	Iraklis	0–1	Panathinaikos	Thessaloniki
19:00			Papadopoulos 75'	Stadium: Makedonikos Stadium; Attendance: 4,300; Referee: Vasilis Terovitsas

18 October 2003 7	Egaleo	2–1	Panathinaikos	Egaleo
21:00	Skopelitis 5'; Chloros 54'		Papadopoulos 6'	Stadium: Stavros Mavrothalassitis Stadium; Attendance: 2,462; Referee: Georgios Douros

26 October 2003 8	Panathinaikos	3–0	Panionios	Ampelokipoi
18:00	Marić 17'; Papadopoulos 65', 79'			Stadium: Leoforos Alexandras Stadium; Attendance: Behind closed doors Referee: Georgios Borovilos

1 November 2003 9	Chalkidona	0–0	Panathinaikos	Nikaia
19:00				Stadium: Neapoli Municipal Stadium; Attendance: 2,118; Referee: Dimitris Kalopoulos

9 November 2003 10	Panathinaikos	1–0	Aris	Ampelokipoi
18:00	Basinas 9' (pen.)			Stadium: Leoforos Alexandras Stadium; Attendance: 8,003; Referee: Georgios Kasnaferis

22 November 2003 11	Olympiacos	1–1	Panathinaikos	Rizoupoli
19:00	Stoltidis 60'		Konstantinou 36'	Stadium: Georgios Kamaras Stadium; Attendance: 9,639; Referee: Kyros Vassaras

30 November 2003 12	Panathinaikos	3–0	PAOK	Ampelokipoi
20:00	Papadopoulos 20'; Michaelsen 37'; Goumas 45+1'			Stadium: Leoforos Alexandras Stadium; Attendance: 9,658; Referee: Athanassios Briakos

6 December 2003 13	Akratitos	0–0	Panathinaikos	Ano Liosia
19:00				Stadium: Giannis Pathiakakis Stadium; Attendance: 1,054; Referee: Kyros Vassaras

14 December 2003 14	Panathinaikos	3–1	Proodeftiki	Ampelokipoi
17:00	Vlaović 16'; Sapanis 34'; Konstantinou 43'		Poulopoulos 30'	Stadium: Leoforos Alexandras Stadium; Attendance: 6,017; Referee: Dimitrios Takidis

21 December 2003 15	Panathinaikos	6–3	Paniliakos	Ampelokipoi
17:00	Goumas 12'; Basinas 43' (pen.), 60', 77'; Epalle 62'; Sapanis 90'		Thomaidis 17', 53'; Henriksen 74' (o.g.)	Stadium: Leoforos Alexandras Stadium; Attendance: 8,014; Referee: Emmanouil Tapatzas

11 January 2004 16	Skoda Xanthi	0–1	Panathinaikos	Xanthi
17:00			Sapanis 4'	Stadium: A.O. Xanthi Stadium; Attendance: 2,732; Referee: Kyros Vassaras

18 January 2004 17	Panathinaikos	1–0	OFI	Ampelokipoi
17:00	Goumas 6'			Stadium: Leoforos Alexandras Stadium; Attendance: 8,676; Referee: Dimitris Dabosis

25 January 2004 18	Kallithea	0–3	Panathinaikos	Kallithea
19:30			Žutautas 23'; Papadopoulos 61'; Konstantinidis 78'	Stadium: Grigoris Lambrakis Stadium; Attendance: 1,637; Referee: Christoforos Zografos

1 February 2004 19	Panathinaikos	2–1	AEK Athens	Ampelokipoi
19:30	Basinas 18'; Sapanis 68'		Liberopoulos 78'	Stadium: Leoforos Alexandras Stadium; Attendance: 10,645; Referee: Kyros Vassaras

8 February 2004 20	Ionikos	1–2	Panathinaikos	Nikaia
19:30	Gutman 5'		Münch 13' (pen.); Papadopoulos 54'	Stadium: Neapolis Municipal Stadium; Attendance: 4,565; Referee: Dimitrios Styliaras

22 February 2004 21	Panathinaikos	3–0	Iraklis	Ampelokipoi
19:00	Papadopoulos 14', 83'; Basinas 52'			Stadium: Leoforos Alexandras Stadium; Attendance: 8,196; Referee: Athanassios Briakos

29 February 2004 22	Panathinaikos	2–0	Egaleo	Ampelokipoi
19:30	Konstantinou 45+1'; González 62'			Stadium: Leoforos Alexandras Stadium; Attendance: 9,742; Referee: Charalampos Karatzas

14 March 2004 23	Panionios	0–1	Panathinaikos	Nea Smyrni
19:00			Sânmărtean 84'	Stadium: Nea Smyrni Stadium; Attendance: 6,036; Referee: Georgios Douros

21 March 2004 24	Panathinaikos	3–0	Chalkidona	Ampelokipoi
19:30	González 55'; Papadopoulos 90'; Michaelsen 90+3'			Stadium: Leoforos Alexandras Stadium; Attendance: 10,952; Referee: Emmanouil Tapatzas

4 April 2004 25	Aris	0–2	Panathinaikos	Thessaloniki
20:00			Papadopoulos 4'; Michaelsen 38'	Stadium: Makedonikos Stadium; Attendance: 2,634; Referee: Dimitrios Takidis

18 April 2004 26	Panathinaikos	2–2	Olympiacos	Ampelikipoi
20:30	Basinas 7' (pen.); Goumas 81'		Stoltidis 44'; Đorđević 54'	Stadium: Leoforos Alexandras Stadium; Attendance: 11,699; Referee: Georgios Douros

25 April 2004 27	PAOK	1–2	Panathinaikos	Thessaloniki
19:00	Hagan 7'		Papadopoulos 48'; Olisadebe 90+3'	Stadium: Toumba Stadium; Attendance: 17,805; Referee: Iraklis Tsikinis

2 May 2004 28	Panathinaikos	5–1	Akratitos	Ampelikipoi
19:00	Papadopoulos 23', 68'; González 56', 84'; Bletsas 90+3' (o.g.)		Bayazid 53'	Stadium: Leoforos Alexandras Stadium; Attendance: 9,088; Referee: Konstantinos Finokaliotis

16 May 2004 29	Proodeftiki	1–2	Panathinaikos	Korydallos
19:00	Spertos 45'		González 15'; Olisadebe 89'	Stadium: Korydallos Stadium; Attendance: 2,823; Referee: Giannis Kaminaris

22 May 2004 30	Paniliakos	0–1	Panathinaikos	Pyrgos
17:15			Olisadebe 76'	Stadium: Pyrgos Stadium; Attendance: 254; Referee: Vasilis Terovitsas

=== Greek Cup ===
==== First Round ====
16 August 2003 First leg	Panathinaikos	2–0	Niki Volos	Patras
21:00 EEST	Papadopoulos 22' (pen.); Goumas 75'	Report (page 3)		Stadium: Kostas Davourlis Stadium; Referee: Nikos Koulias (Thesprotia)

27 August 2003 Second leg	Niki Volos	1–1 (1–3 agg.)	Panathinaikos	Volos
17:30 EEST	Goumas 71'	Report (page 3)	Marić 74'	Stadium: Volos Municipal Stadium; Referee: Dimitris Dabosis (Pieria)

==== Second Round ====
Panathinaikos qualified to the Round of 16 without a match.

==== Round of 16 ====
17 December 2003 First leg	Panathinaikos	1–0	OFI	Ampelokipoi
21:15 EET	Sânmărtean 55'	Report (page 14)		Stadium: Leoforos Alexandras Stadium; Referee: Charalampos Karatzas (Euboea)

21 January 2004 Second leg	OFI	1–1 (1–2 agg.)	Panathinaikos	Heraklion
14:30 EET	Bykowski 67'	Report (page 14)	Basinas 55'	Stadium: Theodoros Vardinogiannis Stadium; Referee: Giorgos Douros (Corinthia)

==== Quarter-finals ====
11 February 2004 First leg	Patraikos	0–1	Panathinaikos	Patras
18:00 EET		Report (page 16)	Michaelsen 21'	Stadium: Prosfygika Stadium; Referee: Nikos Koulias (Thesprotia)

17 March 2004 Second leg	Panathinaikos	2–1 (3–1 agg.)	Patraikos	Ampelokipoi
17:00 EET	Papadopoulos 20'; Sapanis 1'	Report (page 16-17)	Georgopoulos 51'	Stadium: Leoforos Alexandras Stadium; Referee: Nikos Koulias (Thesprotia)

==== Semi-finals ====
27 March 2004 First leg	Panathinaikos	2–2	AEK Athens	Ampelokipoi
20:00 EEST	Basinas 29' (pen.); Olisadebe 90+2'	Report (page 18)	Katsouranis 20'; Lakis 88'	Stadium: Leoforos Alexandras Stadium; Attendance: 8,657; Referee: Thanasis Briakos (Epirus)

7 April 2004 Second leg	AEK Athens	0–1 (2–3 agg.)	Panathinaikos	Ano Liosia
20:00 EEST		Report (page 18)	Goumas 9'	Stadium: Giannis Pathiakakis Stadium; Attendance: 5,000; Referee: Christoforos Zografos (Athens)

==== Final ====
8 May 2004	Panathinaikos	3–1	Olympiacos	Nea Smyrni
21:00 EEST	Papadopoulos 3'; Konstantinou 68', 80'	Report (pages 18-19)	Giovanni 65'	Stadium: Nea Smyrni Stadium; Attendance: 7,500; Referee: Giorgos Kasnaferis (Argolida)

=== UEFA Champions League ===
==== Group E ====
Pos	Team	Pld	W	D	L	GF	GA	GD	Pts	Qualification
1	(England) Manchester United	6	5	0	1	13	2	+11	15	Advance to knockout stage
2	(Germany) VfB Stuttgart	6	4	0	2	9	6	+3	12	Advance to knockout stage
3	(Greece) Panathinaikos	6	1	1	4	5	13	−8	4	Transfer to UEFA Cup
4	(Scotland) Rangers	6	1	1	4	4	10	−6	4	

Source: RSSSF

16 September 2003 1	Manchester United (England)	5–0	(Greece) Panathinaikos	Manchester, England
20:45	Silvestre 13'; Fortune 14'; Solskjær 33'; Butt 40'; Djemba-Djemba 83'	Report		Stadium: Old Trafford; Attendance: 66,525; Referee: Alain Sars (France)

1 October 2003 2	Panathinaikos (Greece)	1–1	(Scotland) Rangers	Athens, Greece
20:45	Konstantinidis 88'	Report	Emerson 35'	Stadium: Leoforos Alexandras Stadium; Attendance: 13,725; Referee: Arturo Daudén Ibáñez (Spain)

22 October 2003 3	Stuttgart (Germany)	2–0	(Greece) Panathinaikos	Stuttgart, Germany
20:45	Szabics 13'; Soldo 25'	Report		Stadium: Gottlieb-Daimler-Stadion; Attendance: 50,350; Referee: Paul Allaerts (Belgium)

4 November 2003 4	Panathinaikos (Greece)	1–3	(Germany) Stuttgart	Athens, Greece
20:45	Konstantinou 60'	Report	Fyssas 68' (o.g.); Kurányi 75'; Hinkel 77'	Stadium: Leoforos Alexandras Stadium; Attendance: 6,100; Referee: Massimo De Santis (Italy)

26 November 2003 5	Panathinaikos (Greece)	0–1	(England) Manchester United	Athens, Greece
20:45		Report	Forlán 85'	Stadium: Leoforos Alexandras Stadium; Attendance: 6,900; Referee: Jan Wegereef (Netherlands)

9 December 2003 6	Rangers (Scotland)	1–3	(Greece) Panathinaikos	Glasgow, Scotland
20:45	Mols 28'	Report	Žutautas 32'; Basinas 62'; Konstantinou 80'	Stadium: Ibrox Stadium; Attendance: 48,600; Referee: Herbert Fandel (Germany)

=== UEFA Cup ===
==== Round of 32 ====
26 February 2004 First leg	Auxerre (France)	0–0	(Greece) Panathinaikos	Auxerre, France
20:00		Report		Stadium: Stade de l'Abbé-Deschamps; Attendance: 19,000; Referee: Stuart Dougal (Scotland)

3 March 2004 Second leg	Panathinaikos (Greece)	0–1 (0–1 agg.)	(France) Auxerre	Athens, Greece
20:30		Report	Kalou 71'	Stadium: Leoforos Alexandras Stadium; Attendance: 14,500; Referee: Florian Meyer (Germany)
