= 2004–05 Panathinaikos F.C. season =

Panathinaikos
2004–05 season
- Chairman: Argiris Mitsou
- Manager: Zdeněk Ščasný
- Ground: Leoforos Alexandras Stadium
- Alpha Ethniki: 2nd
- Greek Cup: 5th Round
- Champions League: Group Stage
- UEFA Cup: Round of 32
- Top goalscorer: League: Michalis Konstantinou (15); All: Michalis Konstantinou (15)
- Highest home attendance: 14,860 vs Olympiacos (10 April 2005)
- Lowest home attendance: 2,753 vs Apollon Kalamarias (11 February 2005)
- Average home league attendance: 8,139
Home colours	Away colours

In the 2004–05 season Panathinaikos played for 46th consecutive time in Greece's top division, Alpha Ethniki. They also competed in UEFA Champions League, UEFA Cup and Greek Cup. Season started with Zdeněk Ščasný as team manager.

== Players ==
=== First-team squad ===
Squad at end of season

Note: Flags indicate national team as defined under FIFA eligibility rules; some limited exceptions apply. Players may hold more than one non-FIFA nationality.

No.	Pos.	Nation	Player
1	GK	CRO	Mario Galinović
2	DF	DEN	Rene Henriksen
3	DF	GRE	Ilias Kotsios
4	MF	CRO	Silvio Marić
5	DF	RSA	Nasief Morris
6	DF	GER	Markus Münch
7	FW	SWE	Njogu Demba-Nyrén
8	DF	GRE	Giannis Goumas (captain)
9	MF	ARG	Ezequiel Gonzalez
10	FW	CMR	Joël Epalle
11	FW	GRE	Dimitris Papadopoulos (vice-captain)
12	GK	GRE	Kostas Chalkias
15	DF	CRO	Srđan Andrić
16	DF	GRE	Sotiris Kyrgiakos
18	MF	ROU	Lucian Sânmărtean
19	FW	CYP	Michalis Konstantinou

No.	Pos.	Nation	Player
20	MF	GRE	Angelos Basinas
21	FW	ROU	Dumitru Mitu
22	MF	GRE	Miltiadis Sapanis
23	FW	POL	Emmanuel Olisadebe
24	DF	GRE	Loukas Vyntra
25	GK	GRE	Stefanos Kotsolis
26	DF	CZE	Rudolf Skácel
27	DF	GRE	Pantelis Konstantinidis
28	DF	FRA	Alain Raguel
29	FW	POL	Maciej Bykowski
30	GK	GRE	Alexandros Tzorvas
40	MF	CYP	Kostas Charalambidis
41	DF	BRA	Anderson Lima
44	FW	GRE	Theofanis Gekas
50	MF	NED	Nordin Wooter

== Competitions ==
=== Alpha Ethniki ===
==== League table ====
Pos	Team	Pld	W	D	L	GF	GA	GD	Pts	Qualification or relegation
1	Olympiacos (Note: Olympiacos and Panionios originally had three points deducted for the incidents before their match in the round 16 but these deductions were cancelled on appeal.) (C)	30	19	8	3	54	18	+36	65	Qualification for Champions League group stage
2	Panathinaikos	30	19	7	4	51	18	+33	64	Qualification for Champions League third qualifying round
3	AEK Athens	30	17	11	2	46	22	+24	62	Qualification for UEFA Cup first round
4	Skoda Xanthi	30	14	8	8	43	29	+14	50	Qualification for UEFA Cup first round
5	PAOK	30	13	7	10	43	39	+4	46	Qualification for UEFA Cup first round

Source: Galanis Sports Data
Rules for classification: 1st points; 2nd head-to-head points; 3rd head-to-head goal difference; 4th decision match.
(C) Champions

==== Matches ====
19 September 2004 1	Panathinaikos	3–0	Ionikos	Ampelokipoi
21:15	González 34'; D. Papadopoulos 43', 49'			Stadium: Leoforos Alexandras Stadium; Attendance: 12,244; Referee: Dimitrios Styliaras

25 September 2004 2	Panathinaikos	3–1	Skoda Xanthi	Ampelokipoi
21:00	Basinas 17', 64'; Skácel 22'		Baykara 3'	Stadium: Leoforos Alexandras Stadium; Attendance: 12,169; Referee: Giannis Spyropoulos

3 October 2004 3	Apollon Kalamarias	0–1	Panathinaikos	Thessaloniki
20:00			D. Papadopoulos 24'	Stadium: Kalamaria Stadium; Attendance: 2,903; Referee: Giannis Tsachilidis

16 October 2004 4	Panathinaikos	0–0	Egaleo	Ampelokipoi
20:00				Stadium: Leoforos Alexandras Stadium; Attendance: 11,988; Referee: Athanasios Briakos

24 October 2004 5	Kerkyra	2–0	Panathinaikos	Corfu
17:30	Gittas 19'; N'Diaye 30'			Stadium: Kerkyra Stadium; Attendance: 3,900; Referee: Antonios Kouklakis

30 October 2004 6	Panathinaikos	4–0	Panionios	Ampelokipoi
20:00	D. Papadopoulos 33', 63'; Konstantinou 48'; Bykowski 78'			Stadium: Leoforos Alexandras Stadium; Attendance: 10,355; Referee: Vasilios Skoufitsas

7 November 2004 7	Iraklis	0–4	Panathinaikos	Thessaloniki
19:30			Bykowski 26', 30'; Konstantinou 64'; Kyrgiakos 68'	Stadium: Kaftanzoglio Stadium; Attendance: 7,300; Referee: Dimitrios Takidis

20 November 2004 8	Panathinaikos	1–0	Kallithea	Ampelokipoi
20:00	Konstantinou 21'			Stadium: Leoforos Alexandras Stadium; Attendance: 9,007; Referee: Charalampos Karatzas

28 November 2004 9	Aris	1–1	Panathinaikos	Thessaloniki
19:00	A. Papadopoulos 90+3'		D. Papadopoulos 87'	Stadium: Kleanthis Vikelidis Stadium; Attendance: 5,769; Referee: Spyros Vasiliou

4 December 2004 10	Olympiacos	1–0	Panathinaikos	Piraeus
19:00	Rivaldo 30'			Stadium: Karaiskakis Stadium; Attendance: 30,856; Referee: Georgios Kasnaferis

12 December 2004 11	Panathinaikos	1–0	Ergotelis	Ampelokipoi
19:00	Konstantinou 90'			Stadium: Leoforos Alexandras Stadium; Attendance: 8,720; Referee: Mpampis Karatzas

19 December 2004 12	Chalkidona	0–2	Panathinaikos	Nikaia
19:00			Konstantinou 22'; Münch 52' (pen.)	Stadium: Neapolis Municipal Stadium; Attendance: 1,676; Referee: Kyros Vassaras

29 December 2004 13	Panathinaikos	2–1	PAOK	Ampelokipoi
17:30	Goumas 38'; Konstantinou 86'		Andralas 34'	Stadium: Leoforos Alexandras Stadium; Attendance: 11,001; Referee: Michael Koukoulakis

9 January 2005 14	AEK Athens	1–0	Panathinaikos	Marousi
19:30	Liberopoulos 85'			Stadium: Athens Olympic Stadium; Attendance: 44,193; Referee: Kyros Vassaras

16 January 2005 15	Panathinaikos	5–1	OFI	Ampelokipoi
17:00	Kyrgiakos 31', 37'; Marić 62'; Konstantinou 70'; Bykowski 88'		Kazantzis 90+2'	Stadium: Leoforos Alexandras Stadium; Attendance: Behind closed doors Referee: Dimitrios Takidis

23 January 2005 16	Ionikos	0–0	Panathinaikos	Nikaia
17:00				Stadium: Neapolis Municipal Stadium; Attendance: 1,197; Referee: Dimitrios Styliaras

30 January 2005 17	Skoda Xanthi	3–1	Panathinaikos	Xanthi
16:45	Zapropoulos 6'; Luciano 36'; Baykara 68'		González 44'	Stadium: Skoda Xanthi Arena; Attendance: 3,285; Referee: Spyros Vasiliou

12 February 2005 18	Panathinaikos	5–1	Apollon Kalamarias	Ampelokipoi
19:30	Goumas 18'; Gekas 31', 53'; Konstantinou 47', 50'		Cleyton 90+3'	Stadium: Leoforos Alexandras Stadium; Attendance: 2,753; Referee: Giannis Kaminaris

20 February 2005 19	Egaleo	0–1	Panathinaikos	Egaleo
19:30			Gekas 29'	Stadium: Stavros Mavrothalassitis Stadium; Attendance: 1,539; Referee: Gerasimos Mazarakis

27 February 2005 20	Panathinaikos	1–0	Kerkyra	Ampelokipoi
17:00	Konstantinou 74'			Stadium: Leoforos Alexandras Stadium; Attendance: 6,103; Referee: Avraam Kemparidis

6 March 2005 21	Panionios	0–1	Panathinaikos	Nea Smyrni
19:15			Gekas 27'	Stadium: Nea Smyrni Stadium; Attendance: 2,671; Referee: Giannis Tsachilidis

12 March 2005 22	Panathinaikos	0–0	Iraklis	Ampelokipoi
19:30				Stadium: Leoforos Alexandras Stadium; Attendance: 9,187; Referee: Ioakim Efthymiadis

19 March 2005 23	Kallithea	0–2	Panathinaikos	Kallithea
19:30			Gekas 28' (pen.); Basinas 55'	Stadium: Grigoris Lambrakis Stadium; Attendance: 2,537; Referee: Kyros Vassaras

3 April 2005 24	Panathinaikos	0–0	Aris	Ampelokipoi
19:15				Stadium: Leoforos Alexandras Stadium; Attendance: 13,123; Referee: Anastasios Kakos

10 April 2005 25	Panathinaikos	1–0	Olympiacos	Ampelokipoi
21:00	Konstantinou 44'			Stadium: Leoforos Alexandras Stadium; Attendance: 14,860; Referee: Athanasios Briakos

16 April 2005 26	Ergotelis	1–3	Panathinaikos	Heraklion
17:00	Sylla 44'		Gekas 25'; Konstantinou 54'; González 75'	Stadium: Pankritio Stadium; Attendance: 21,995; Referee: Kyros Vassaras

24 April 2005 27	Panathinaikos	6–3	Chalkidona	Ampelokipoi
20:00	Münch 10' (pen.); González 45'; Gekas 45+2'; Konstantinou 58', 59'; D. Papadopoulos 75'		Sotirhos 25'; Katemis 40', 56'	Stadium: Leoforos Alexandras Stadium; Attendance: Behind closed doors Referee: Dimitrios Takidis

8 May 2005 28	PAOK	1–1	Panathinaikos	Thessaloniki
17:00	Salpingidis 25'		D. Papadopoulos 23'	Stadium: Toumba Stadium; Attendance: 17,845; Referee: Athanasios Briakos

15 May 2005 29	Panathinaikos	0–0	AEK Athens	Ampelokipoi
18:45				Stadium: Leoforos Alexandras Stadium; Attendance: Behind closed doors Referee: Kyros Vassaras

25 May 2005 30	OFI	1–2	Panathinaikos	Heraklion
18:30	Machlas 46'		Gekas 25'; Konstantinou 61'	Stadium: Theodoros Vardinogiannis Stadium; Attendance: 2,457; Referee: Manolis Tapantzas

=== Greek Cup ===
==== First round ====
10 September 2004 First leg	Panathinaikos	3–2	Atsalenios	Marousi
13:00 EEST (UTC+3)	Skácel 17', 63'; Sapanis 80'	Report	Taousianis 3'; Argentis 24'	Stadium: Athens Olympic Stadium; Referee: Charalampos Karatzas (Euboea)

27 October 2004 Second leg	Atsalenios	0–4 (2–7 agg.)	Panathinaikos	Heraklion
13:00 EEST (UTC+3)		Report	Papadopoulos 6', 22'; Mitu 61'; Sapanis 77'	Stadium: Atsalenios Stadium; Referee: Giannis Tsachilidis (Piraeus)

==== Round of 32 ====
15 December 2004 First leg	Panathinaikos	2–0	Ionikos	Ampelokipoi
18:00 EET (UTC+2)	Skácel 28'; Sapanis 88'	Report		Stadium: Leoforos Alexandras Stadium; Referee: Spyros Vasileiou (Elis)

12 January 2005 Second leg	Ionikos	0–1 (0–3 agg.)	Panathinaikos	Nikaia
18:00 EET (UTC+2)			Konstantinidis 85'	Stadium: Neapolis Municipal Stadium; Referee: Dimitris Kalopoulos (Thessaloniki)

==== Round of 16 ====
27 January 2005 First leg	AEK Athens	1–1	Panathinaikos	Marousi
19:00 EET (UTC+2)	Liberopoulos 90+4'	Report	Konstantinou 47'	Stadium: Athens Olympic Stadium; Attendance: 17,280; Referee: Iraklis Tsikinis (Messinia)

3 February 2005 Second leg	Panathinaikos	1–3 (2–4 agg.)	AEK Athens	Ampelokipoi
19:00 EET (UTC+2)	Konstantinou 51'	Report	Katsouranis 7' (pen.); Soares 55'; Ivić 77'	Stadium: Leoforos Alexandras Stadium; Attendance: 5,153; Referee: Vasilis Terovitsas (Aetoloacarnania)

=== UEFA Champions League ===
==== Group E ====
Pos	Team	Pld	W	D	L	GF	GA	GD	Pts	Qualification
1	(England) Arsenal	6	2	4	0	11	6	+5	10	Advance to knockout stage
2	(Netherlands) PSV Eindhoven	6	3	1	2	6	7	−1	10	Advance to knockout stage
3	(Greece) Panathinaikos	6	2	3	1	11	8	+3	9	Transfer to UEFA Cup
4	(Norway) Rosenborg	6	0	2	4	6	13	−7	2	

14 September 2004 1	Panathinaikos (Greece)	2–1	(Norway) Rosenborg	Athens, Greece
20:45	González 43', 79'	Report	Johnsen 90'	Stadium: Leoforos Alexandras Stadium; Attendance: 13,204; Referee: Paul Allaerts (Belgium)

29 September 2004 2	PSV Eindhoven (Netherlands)	1–0	(Greece) Panathinaikos	Eindhoven, Netherlands
20:45	Vennegoor of Hesselink 80'	Report		Stadium: Philips Stadion; Attendance: 26,500; Referee: Konrad Plautz (Austria)

20 October 2004 3	Panathinaikos (Greece)	2–2	(England) Arsenal	Athens, Greece
20:45	González 65'; Olisadebe 82'	Report	Ljungberg 18'; Henry 74'	Stadium: Leoforos Alexandras Stadium; Attendance: 12,346; Referee: Valentin Ivanov (Russia)

2 November 2004 4	Arsenal (England)	1–1	(Greece) Panathinaikos	London, England
20:45	Henry 16' (pen.)	Report	Cygan 75' (o.g.)	Stadium: Highbury; Attendance: 35,137; Referee: Luis Medina Cantalejo (Spain)

24 November 2004 5	Rosenborg (Norway)	2–2	(Greece) Panathinaikos	Trondheim, Norway
20:45	Helstad 68', 76'	Report	Konstantinou 16'; Skácel 71'	Stadium: Lerkendal Stadion; Attendance: 19,900; Referee: Massimo de Santis (Italy)

7 December 2004 6	Panathinaikos (Greece)	4–1	(Netherlands) PSV Eindhoven	Athens, Greece
20:45	Papadopoulos 30'; Münch 45' (pen.), 57'; Sânmărtean 81'	Report	Beasley 37'	Stadium: Leoforos Alexandras Stadium; Attendance: 10,196; Referee: Peter Fröjdfeldt (Sweden)

=== UEFA Cup ===
==== Knockout stage ====
===== Round of 32 =====
16 February 2005 First leg	Panathinaikos (Greece)	1–0	(Spain) Sevilla	Athens, Greece
19:00	Vyntra 75'	Report		Stadium: Leoforos Alexandras Stadium; Attendance: 16,600; Referee: Claude Colombo (France)

24 February 2005 Second leg	Sevilla (Spain)	2–0 (2–1 agg.)	(Greece) Panathinaikos	Seville, Spain
21:30	Makukula 83'; Adriano 90+2'	Report		Stadium: Ramón Sánchez Pizjuán Stadium; Attendance: 42,000; Referee: Tom Henning Øvrebø (Norway)

== Team kit ==
Home	Away
