= 2001–02 Panathinaikos F.C. season =

Panathinaikos
2001–02 season
- Owner: Giannis Vardinogiannis
- Chairman: Angelos Filippidis
- Manager: Giannis Kyrastas (until 10 December); Sergio Markarián (from 17 December)
- Ground: Leoforos Alexandras Stadium
- Alpha Ethniki: 3rd
- Greek Cup: Third round
- Champions League: Quarter-finals
- Top goalscorer: League: Goran Vlaović (13); All: Goran Vlaović (18)
Home colours	Away colours	Third colours

In the 2001–02 season Panathinaikos played for 43rd consecutive time in Greece's top division, Alpha Ethniki. The club also competed in the UEFA Champions League and the Greek Cup.

== Players ==
=== First-team squad ===
Squad at end of season

Note: Flags indicate national team as defined under FIFA eligibility rules; some limited exceptions apply. Players may hold more than one non-FIFA nationality.

No.	Pos.	Nation	Player
1	GK	GRE	Antonios Nikopolidis
2	DF	DEN	René Henriksen
3	DF	GRE	Filippos Darlas
4	DF	GRE	Giourkas Seitaridis
5	MF	ARG	Fernando Galetto
6	MF	POR	Paulo Sousa
7	FW	CRO	Goran Vlaović
8	DF	GRE	Giannis Goumas
9	FW	POL	Krzysztof Warzycha
10	MF	GHA	Derek Boateng
11	FW	FIN	Joonas Kolkka
12	MF	DEN	Jan Michaelsen
14	DF	GRE	Leonidas Vokolos
15	DF	CRO	Daniel Šarić

No.	Pos.	Nation	Player
16	DF	GRE	Sotirios Kyrgiakos
17	GK	GRE	Panagiotis Bartzokas
18	DF	GRE	Minas Pitsos
19	FW	CYP	Michalis Konstantinou
20	MF	GRE	Angelos Basinas
21	FW	GRE	Nikos Liberopoulos
22	MF	GRE	Miltiadis Sapanis
23	FW	POL	Emmanuel Olisadebe
24	GK	GRE	Alexandros Tzorvas
25	GK	GRE	Stefanos Kotsolis
26	MF	GRE	Giorgos Karagounis
27	DF	CRO	Robert Jarni
30	DF	GRE	Takis Fyssas

== Competitions ==
=== Alpha Ethniki ===
==== League table ====
Pos	Team	Pld	W	D	L	GF	GA	GD	Pts	Qualification or relegation
1	Olympiacos (C)	26	17	7	2	69	30	+39	58 (Note: Head-to-head record: AEK Athens–Olympiacos 2–3, Olympiacos–AEK Athens 4–3.)	Qualification for Champions League first group stage
2	AEK Athens	26	19	1	6	65	28	+37	58	Qualification for Champions League third qualifying round
3	Panathinaikos	26	16	7	3	53	25	+28	55	Qualification for UEFA Cup first round
4	PAOK	26	14	6	6	55	45	+10	48	Qualification for UEFA Cup first round
5	Skoda Xanthi	26	12	6	8	34	26	+8	42	Qualification for UEFA Cup first round

Source: Galanis Sports Data
Rules for classification: 1st points; 2nd head-to-head points; 3rd head-to-head goal difference; 4th decision match.
(C) Champions

==== Results summary ====
Overall								Home						Away					
Pld	W	D	L	GF	GA	GD	Pts	W	D	L	GF	GA	GD	W	D	L	GF	GA	GD
26	16	7	3	53	25	+28	55	11	1	1	35	12	+23	5	6	2	18	13	+5

Last updated: 8 May 2002.
Source: Competitive matches

==== Results by round ====
Round	1	2	3	4	5	6	7	8	9	10	11	12	13	14	15	16	17	18	19	20	21	22	23	24	25	26
Ground	A	H	A	H	A	H	A	A	H	A	H	A	H	H	A	H	A	H	A	H	H	A	H	A	H	A
Result	D	W	D	W	L	W	L	D	L	W	W	W	W	W	W	W	D	W	D	W	D	D	W	W	W	W
Position	6	3	3	3	5	3	6	5	8	6	5	4	4	4	3	2	3	3	3	3	3	3	3	3	3	3

Source: League matches
A = Away; H = Home; W = Win; D = Draw; L = Loss

==== Matches ====
23 September 2001 1	Panionios	2–2	Panathinaikos	Nea Smyrni
17:00	Kafalis 35'; Mouzaoui 56'		Olisadebe 45+1'; Konstantinou 51'	Stadium: Panionios Stadium; Attendance: 5,406; Referee: Spiridon Papadakos

30 September 2001 2	Panathinaikos	5–1	OFI	Ampelokipoi
18:45	Olisadebe 2', 36', 89'; Vlaović 14'; Boateng 30'		Belevonis 24'	Stadium: Leoforos Alexandras Stadium; Attendance: 10,650; Referee: Giannis Bisogiannis

13 October 2001 3	Akratitos	0–0	Panathinaikos	Ano Liosia
20:00				Stadium: Giannis Pathiakakis Stadium; Attendance: 1,731; Referee: Pavlos Papilias

20 October 2001 4	Panathinaikos	8–0	Panachaiki	Ampelokipoi
20:00	Konstantinou 22', 28'; Vlaović 27', 35', 39', 49', 69'; Kolkka 79'			Stadium: Leoforos Alexandras Stadium; Attendance: 8,830; Referee: Georgios Tsagarakis

4 November 2001 5	AEK Athens	2–0	Panathinaikos	Nea Filadelfeia
21:15	Tsiartas 27'; Nikolaidis 78'			Stadium: Nikos Goumas Stadium; Attendance: 13,169; Referee: Ioakim Efthimiadis

18 November 2001 6	Panathinaikos	2–1	Aris	Ampelokipoi
17:00	Konstantinou 9', 56'		Ivić 47'	Stadium: Leoforos Alexandras Stadium; Attendance: 13,206; Referee: Pavlos Papilias

25 November 2001 7	Iraklis	2–1	Panathinaikos	Thessaloniki
17:00	Hagan 47'; Koutsoures 58'		Konstantinou 84'	Stadium: Kaftanzoglio Stadium; Attendance: 10,069; Referee: Georgios Borovilos

1 December 2001 8	Olympiacos	2–2	Panathinaikos	Marousi
19:00	Alexandris 25'; Đorđević 42'		Olisadebe 72', 77'	Stadium: Olympic Stadium; Attendance: 40,982; Referee: Nikos Aggelakis

9 December 2001 9	Panathinaikos	1–2	PAOK	Ampelokipoi
17:00	Kolkka 7'		Okkas 70'; Konstantinidis 82'	Stadium: Leoforos Alexandras Stadium; Attendance: 10,337; Referee: Athanassios Briakos

16 December 2001 10	Ionikos	0–2	Panathinaikos	Nikaia
19:00			Konstantinou 52'; Vlaović 90'	Stadium: Neapoli Municipal Stadium; Attendance: 1,372; Referee: Christos Trikalis

13 January 2002 11	Panathinaikos	2–1	Egaleo	Ampelokipoi
15:00	Basinas 75'; Warzycha 89'		Agritis 48'	Stadium: Leoforos Alexandras Stadium; Attendance: 9,157; Referee: Dimitrios Takidis

20 January 2002 12	Skoda Xanthi	1–2	Panathinaikos	Xanthi
17:00	Kordonouris 37'		Vlaović 44'; Olisadebe 90+3'	Stadium: A.O. Xanthi Stadium; Attendance: 4,659; Referee: Christos Trikalis

27 January 2002 13	Panathinaikos	1–0	Ethnikos Asteras	Ampelokipoi
15:00	Kyrgiakos 55'			Stadium: Leoforos Alexandras Stadium; Attendance: 10,385; Referee: Lambros Gouvos

3 February 2002 14	Panathinaikos	2–1	Panionios	Ampelokipoi
17:00	Basinas 34' (pen.); Goumas 90'		Šiljak 71'	Stadium: Leoforos Alexandras Stadium; Attendance: 15,621; Referee: Ioannis Spiropoulos

9 February 2002 15	OFI	0–1	Panathinaikos	Heraklion
17:00			Karagounis 79'	Stadium: Theodoros Vardinogiannis Stadium; Attendance: 6,451; Referee: Spiridon Papadakos

16 February 2002 16	Panathinaikos	1–0	Akratitos	Ampelokipoi
17:00	Konstantinou 34'			Stadium: Leoforos Alexandras Stadium; Attendance: 15,606; Referee: Giannis Bisogiannis

23 February 2002 17	Panachaiki	0–0	Panathinaikos	Patras
19:00				Stadium: Kostas Davourlis Stadium; Attendance: 10,121; Referee: Ioakim Efthimiadis

3 March 2002 18	Panathinaikos	2–0	AEK Athens	Ampelokipoi
19:00	Basinas 12'; Karagounis 21'			Stadium: Leoforos Alexandras Stadium; Attendance: 15,166; Referee: Georgios Tsagarakis

9 March 2002 19	Aris	0–0	Panathinaikos	Thessaloniki
17:00				Stadium: Kleanthis Vikelidis Stadium; Attendance: 7,083; Referee: Pavlos Papilias

16 March 2002 20	Panathinaikos	2–1	Iraklis	Ampelokipoi
18:30	Olisadebe 73', 83'		Rambert 26'	Stadium: Leoforos Alexandras Stadium; Attendance: 11,421; Referee: Iraklis Tsikinis

24 March 2002 21	Panathinaikos	1–1	Olympiacos	Ampelokipoi
19:00	Olisadebe 76'		Đorđević 89' (pen.)	Stadium: Leoforos Alexandras Stadium; Attendance: 14,557; Referee: Ioakim Efthimiadis

31 March 2002 22	PAOK	2–2	Panathinaikos	Thessaloniki
17:00	Spasić 23'; Frousos 50'		Karagounis 67'; Konstantinou 73'	Stadium: Toumba Stadium; Attendance: 22,000; Referee: Pavlos Papilias

24 April 2002 23	Panathinaikos	5–3	Ionikos	Ampelokipoi
19:00	Warzycha 10'; Vlaović 15'; Sapanis 19'; Šarić 24'; Basinas 55'		Frantzeskos 43'; Makor 53'; Delgado 59' (pen.)	Stadium: Leoforos Alexandras Stadium; Attendance: Behind closed doors Referee: Vasileios Terovitsas

14 April 2002 24	Egaleo	1–4	Panathinaikos	Aigaleo
18:30	Agritis 90+2'		Vlaović 12', 63', 87'; Warzycha 74'	Stadium: Stavros Mavrothalassitis Stadium; Attendance: 1,655; Referee: Konstantinos Finokaliotis

20 April 2002 25	Panathinaikos	3–1	Skoda Xanthi	Ampelokipoi
17:30	Warzycha 32', 75'; Sapanis 49'		Labriakos 24'	Stadium: Leoforos Alexandras Stadium; Attendance: 5,655; Referee: Dimitrios Takidis

8 May 2002 26	Ethnikos Asteras	1–2	Panathinaikos	Kaisariani
17:30	Lagos 74'		Sapanis 17'; Warzycha 77'	Stadium: Michalis Kritikopoulos Stadium; Attendance: 2,850; Referee: Christoforos Zografos

=== Greek Cup ===
==== Group 10 ====
Pos	Team	Pld	W	D	L	GF	GA	GD	Pts	Qualification	PAO	APK	PTR	MAR
1	Panathinaikos	6	3	3	0	11	4	+7	12	Second Round		1–0	0–0	6–2
2	Apollon Kalamarias	6	3	2	1	13	6	+7	11	Second Round	1–1		4–1	3–0
3	Patraikos	6	1	4	1	7	9	−2	7		0–0	3–3		1–1
4	Marko	6	0	1	5	5	17	−12	1		1–3	0–2	1–2	

Source: epo.gr

===== Matches =====
30 August 2001 Matchday 1	Apollon Kalamarias	1–1	Panathinaikos	Thessaloniki
13:00 EEST	Demirtzoglou 82'	Report (page 27)	Warzycha 22'	Stadium: Kalamaria Stadium

12 August 2001 Matchday 2	Marko	1–3	Panathinaikos	Markopoulo
13:00 EEST	Lazorik 43' (pen.)	Report (page 27-28)	Vlaović 20', 69'; Olisadebe 58'	Stadium: Municipal Stadium of Markopoulo

18 August 2001 Matchday 3	Panathinaikos	0–0	Patraikos	Ampelokipoi
13:00 EEST		Report (page 28)		Stadium: Leoforos Alexandras Stadium

27 August 2001 Matchday 4	Panathinaikos	1–0	Apollon Kalamarias	Ampelokipoi
13:00 EEST	Kolkka 65'	Report (page 28-29)		Stadium: Leoforos Alexandras Stadium

10 October 2001 Matchday 5	Panathinaikos	6–2	Marko	Ampelokipoi
13:00 EEST	Basinas 30' (pen.); Vlaović 33'; Warzycha 36', 54'; Boateng 51'; Fyssas 63'	Report (page 29)	Vokolos 24' (o.g.); Tosounidis 32' (pen.)	Stadium: Leoforos Alexandras Stadium

7 November 2001 Matchday 6	Patraikos	0–0	Panathinaikos	Patras
13:00 EET		Report (page 30)		Stadium: Prosfygika Stadium

==== Second round ====
Panathinaikos qualified to the Round of 16 without a match.

==== Round of 16 ====
16 January 2002 First leg	Iraklis	1–0	Panathinaikos	Thessaloniki
16:30 EET	Nikopolidis 37' (o.g.)	Report (page 36)		Stadium: Kaftanzoglio Stadium

23 January 2002 Second leg	Panathinaikos	2–1 (2–2a agg.)	Iraklis	Ampelokipoi
18:00 EET	Kyriazis 40' (o.g.); Liberopoulos 43'	Report (page 37-38)	Kebadze 82'	Stadium: Leoforos Alexandras Stadium

=== UEFA Champions League ===
==== Qualifying phase ====
===== Third qualifying round =====
8 August 2001 First leg	Slavia Prague (Czech Republic)	1–2	(Greece) Panathinaikos	Prague, Czech Republic
21:00 CET	Došek (yellow card) 22'; Gedeon (yellow card) 33'; Kuka (yellow card) 37' (goal) 68'; Černý (red card) 86'	Report	Liberopoulos 25'; Karagounis (yellow card) 49', (goal) 57'; Kyrgiakos (yellow card) 53'	Stadium: Stadion Evžena Rošického; Attendance: 14,704; Referee: Alain Hamer (Luxembourg)

22 August 2001 Second leg	Panathinaikos (Greece)	1–0 (3–1 agg.)	(Czech Republic) Slavia Prague	Athens, Greece
20:30 CET	Kyrgiakos (yellow card) 17'; Basinas 27' (pen.), (yellow card) 49'	Report	Sedláček (yellow card) 3'; Novotný (yellow card) 11'	Stadium: Leoforos Alexandras Stadium; Attendance: 14,718; Referee: Anders Frisk (Sweden)

==== First group stage ====
===== Group C =====
Pos	Team	Pld	W	D	L	GF	GA	GD	Pts	Qualification
1	(Greece) Panathinaikos	6	4	0	2	8	3	+5	12	Advance to second group stage
2	(England) Arsenal	6	3	0	3	9	9	0	9	Advance to second group stage
3	(Spain) Mallorca	6	3	0	3	4	9	−5	9	Transfer to UEFA Cup
4	(Germany) Schalke 04	6	2	0	4	9	9	0	6	

Source: RSSSF

11 September 2001 Matchday 1	Schalke 04 (Germany)	0–2	(Greece) Panathinaikos	Gelsenkirchen, Germany
20:45 CET	Mpenza (yellow card) 34'	Report	Michaelsen (yellow card) 16'; Karagounis (yellow card) 71'; Vlaović 75'; Basinas 80'	Stadium: Veltins-Arena; Attendance: 52,333; Referee: Stefano Braschi (Italy)

19 September 2001 Matchday 2	Panathinaikos (Greece)	2–0	(Spain) Mallorca	Athens, Greece
20:45 CET	Vlaović 25'; Konstantinou 28'; Fyssas (yellow card) 59'	Report	Niño (yellow card) 68'	Stadium: Leoforos Alexandras Stadium; Attendance: 15,003; Referee: Konrad Plautz (Austria)

26 September 2001 Matchday 3	Panathinaikos (Greece)	1–0	(England) Arsenal	Athens, Greece
20:45 CET	Karagounis 25'	Report		Stadium: Leoforos Alexandras Stadium; Attendance: 15,012; Referee: Vítor Melo Pereira (Portugal)

16 October 2001 Matchday 4	Arsenal (England)	2–1	(Greece) Panathinaikos	London, England
20:45 CET	Henry 23', 52' (pen.); Upson (yellow card) 28'; Vieira (yellow card) 32'; Lauren (yellow card) 53'; Cole (yellow card) 74'	Report	Sousa (yellow card) 13'; Kyrgiakos (yellow card) 47'; Olisadebe 50'; Michaelsen (yellow card) 80'	Stadium: Highbury; Attendance: 35,432; Referee: Urs Meier (Switzerland)

24 October 2001 Matchday 5	Panathinaikos (Greece)	2–0	(Germany) Schalke 04	Athens, Greece
20:45 CET	Konstantinou (yellow card) 14', (goal) 60'; Olisadebe 31'; Fyssas (yellow card) 41'	Report	Asamoah (yellow card) 11'; Kmetsch (yellow card) 59'; Thon (yellow card) 90'	Stadium: Leoforos Alexandras Stadium; Attendance: 15,097; Referee: Alain Sars (France)

30 October 2001 Matchday 6	Mallorca (Spain)	1–0	(Greece) Panathinaikos	Mallorca, Spain
20:45 CET	Biagini 57'; Robles (yellow card) 76'; Luque (yellow card) 86'	Report	Vokolos (yellow card) 15'	Stadium: Son Moix; Attendance: 11,174; Referee: Karl-Erik Nilsson (Sweden

==== Second group stage ====
===== Group C =====
Pos	Team	Pld	W	D	L	GF	GA	GD	Pts	Qualification
1	(Spain) Real Madrid	6	5	1	0	14	5	+9	16	Advance to knockout stage
2	(Greece) Panathinaikos	6	2	2	2	7	8	−1	8	Advance to knockout stage
3	(Czech Republic) Sparta Prague	6	2	0	4	6	10	−4	6	
4	(Portugal) Porto	6	1	1	4	3	7	−4	4	

Source: RSSSF

21 November 2001 Matchday 1	Panathinaikos (Greece)	0–0	(Portugal) Porto	Athens, Greece
20:45 CET		Report	Paredes (yellow card) 31'; Costinha (yellow card) 37'; Pena (yellow card) 86'; Santos (yellow card) 90+3'	Stadium: Leoforos Alexandras Stadium; Attendance: 15,208; Referee: Graham Poll (England)

4 December 2001 Matchday 2	Real Madrid (Spain)	3–0	(Greece) Panathinaikos	Madrid, Spain
20:45 CET	Helguera 41'; Raúl 66', 72'	Report	Fyssas (yellow card) 39'; Seitaridis (yellow card) 79'	Stadium: Santiago Bernabéu; Attendance: 52,300; Referee: Gilles Veissière (France)

19 February 2002 Matchday 3	Sparta Prague (Czech Republic)	0–2	(Greece) Panathinaikos	Prague, Czech Republic
20:45 CET	Hübschman (red card) 86'	Report	Kyrgiakos (yellow card) 36'; Karagounis 39'; Konstantinou 71'	Stadium: AXA Arena; Attendance: 15,557; Referee: Stuart Dougal (Scotland)

27 February 2002 Matchday 4	Panathinaikos (Greece)	2–1	(Czech Republic) Sparta Prague	Athens, Greece
20:45 CET	Konstantinou 15', 47', (yellow card) 78'; Basinas (yellow card) 23'; Michaelsen (yellow card) 48'	Report	Mynář (yellow card) 45+1'	Stadium: Leoforos Alexandras Stadium; Attendance: 15,053; Referee: Knud Erik Fisker (Denmark)

13 March 2002 Matchday 5	Porto (Portugal)	2–1	(Greece) Panathinaikos	Porto, Portugal
20:45 CET	Söderström (yellow card) 10'; Deco 12'; Pena 54'; Secretário (red card) 79'	Report	Basinas (yellow card) 38'; Kyrgiakos (yellow card) 61'; Kolkka 65', (yellow card) 78'	Stadium: Estádio das Antas; Attendance: 12,835; Referee: Ľuboš Micheľ (Slovakia)

20 March 2002 Matchday 6	Panathinaikos (Greece)	2–2	(Spain) Real Madrid	Athens, Greece
20:45 CET	Liberopoulos 9'; Karagounis (yellow card) 30'; Goumas 64'	Report	Fernando Morientes 11'; Campo (yellow card) 45'; Portillo 80'	Stadium: Leoforos Alexandras Stadium; Attendance: 15,569; Referee: Domenico Messina (Italy)

==== Knockout stage ====
===== quarter finals =====
3 April 2002 First leg	Panathinaikos (Greece)	1–0	(Spain) Barcelona	Athens, Greece
20:45 CET	Kyrgiakos (yellow card) 66'; Šarić (yellow card) 67'; Basinas 80' (pen.)	Report	Coco (yellow card) 44'; Bonano (yellow card) 78'; De Boer (yellow card) 85'	Stadium: Leoforos Alexandras Stadium; Attendance: 15,465; Referee: Terje Hauge (Norway)

9 April 2002 Second leg	Barcelona (Spain)	3–1 (3–2 agg.)	(Greece) Panathinaikos	Barcelona, Spain
20:45 CET	Luis Enrique 23', 49'; Puyol (yellow card) 25'; Xavi (yellow card) 41'; Saviola 61'; Reina (yellow card) 90+1'	Report	Konstantinou 8'; Kolkka (yellow card) 33'; Šarić (yellow card) 56'; Goumas (yellow card) 77'	Stadium: Camp Nou; Attendance: 92,377; Referee: Urs Meier (Switzerland)
