= Emmanuel Olisadebe =

Former footballer (born 1978)

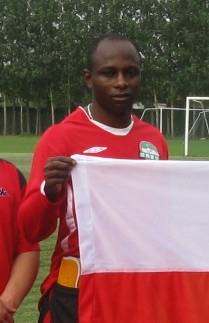
- Olisadebe with Henan in 2009

Personal information
- Date of birth: 22 December 1978 (age 47)
- Place of birth: Warri, Nigeria
- Height: 1.80 m (5 ft 11 in)
- Position: Striker

Youth career
- 1992–1995: Jasper United

Senior career*
Years	Team	Apps	(Gls)
1995–1997	Jasper United	40	(20)
1997–2001	Polonia Warsaw	66	(20)
2001–2005	Panathinaikos	74	(24)
2005–2006	Portsmouth	2	(0)
2006–2007	Xanthi	5	(0)
2007–2008	Kinyras Peyia	17	(6)
2008–2010	Henan	63	(24)
2011–2012	Veria	9	(1)
2026	KS Kłopotów-Osiek	1	(0)
Total		277	(95)

International career
2000–2004	Poland	25	(11)
- * Club domestic league appearances and goals as of 16:28, 12 October 2026 (UTC)

Emmanuel Olisadebe (Polish pronunciation: [ɛmaˈnuɛl olisaˈdɛbɛ]; born 22 December 1978) is a former professional footballer who played as a striker. Born in Nigeria, an indigene of Ibusa in present day Delta State, he played for the Poland national team. He scored 11 international goals in 25 caps between 2000 and 2004, and participated in the 2002 FIFA World Cup. In 2001, he won the Polish Footballer of the Year Award.

Olisadebe began his career with Jasper United in his native Nigeria, before signing with Polish top flight club Polonia Warsaw in 1997. At Polonia, he became a first team regular, and helped the club to the Ekstraklasa title, the Polish League Cup and the Polish Super Cup. After meeting the residency requirements, Olisadebe became a Polish national in 2000 making him available for selection for the Poland national team. He was subsequently called up, and in the process became the first black player to represent Poland at senior level.

After leaving Poland, he went on to play in Greece, Cyprus, England and China before retiring. In September 2026, he came out of retirement for one match, joining Polish amateur club KS Kłopotów-Osiek. He played twenty minutes in their 6–2 victory over Arka Trzebnice on 11 October, in which he made an assist.

== Club career ==
=== Polonia Warsaw ===
Olisadebe began playing for Polonia Warsaw during the 1997–98 Ekstraklasa season where in his first season he played in 13 league games. During his time in the Polish capital, he helped them secure their first championship title in 50 years in the 1999–2000 season, scoring 12 goals in the process. He also won the League Cup and the Super Cup that season.

=== Panathinaikos ===
Olisadebe moved to Panathinaikos in January 2001, where he scored 24 goals in 74 matches. In 2004, he helped the club win the title for the first time in 7 years by scoring all the winning goals in the last three of four games of the championship. He also won the cup that year, making it a double. However, during his time at Panathinaikos he suffered an injury that required surgery in Greece.

=== Portsmouth ===
On 4 January 2006, he joined Portsmouth until the end of the 2005–06 season. He made his debut ten days later, replacing Richard Hughes after 61 minutes of an eventual 1–0 Premier League defeat to Everton at Fratton Park. A week later, he made his only other appearance for the club, playing the final 37 minutes of a 5–0 defeat at Birmingham City, this time in place of Vincent Péricard.

His contract was terminated after four months, at which point he moved to Skoda Xanthi, where he played for nine matches.

=== APOP Kinyras Peyias ===
Olisadebe then featured for APOP Kinyras Peyias, where he played in the 2007–08 season, making 17 appearances and scoring six goals.

=== Henan Construction ===
In 2008, Olisadebe was offered a deal with Chinese Super League club Henan Construction. In his second match with Henan, the third round of 2008 Chinese Super League against Liaoning, he scored two goals. In first season at Henan, he scored 12 goals in 26 league games.

On 27 September, Olisadebe scored the opening goal for Henan in a 2–0 win over Shanghai Shenhua to regain lead in the league less than ten minutes before injuring his knee. Initial diagnosis showed that he had torn his cruciate ligament of the left knee, and the injury could end his career. Further results confirmed that he injured his patellar ligament and would only miss the rest of the season. He was nominated for the MVP awards two years consecutively only to be 2nd in both occasions. Due to his performance, he was granted a Henan province citizenship by the government.

== International career ==
Though Nigerian by birth, Olisadebe became a Polish citizen in 2000 and was selected by the Poland national team. He scored eight goals in ten qualification matches as coach Jerzy Engel's team reached the 2002 FIFA World Cup, their first since 1986, gaining one vote for 2001 FIFA World Player of the Year. He netted their second of three goals in a victory over Norway on 1 September which confirmed qualification.

Olisadebe scored Poland's first goal of their 2002 FIFA World Cup campaign in a 3–1 victory against the United States in Daejeon in the last group match. However, Poland did not progress to the second round and Olisadebe would not score again for Poland. Jerzy Engel, the national coach who brought Olisadebe into the fold, resigned following Poland’s exit from the World Cup, and, barring a handful of sporadic appearances, his resignation ended Olisadebe’s association with the national team as well.

== Personal life ==
Olisadebe supported the "Let's Kick Racism out of the Stadiums" campaign, organised by the Polish Never Again Association. He married a Polish woman, Beata Smolińska, in 2001 and they remained married until 2017; they parted on friendly terms. Olisadebe retired from football in 2012 and eventually moved back to Nigeria. Although he admits to sometimes missing Poland, he prefers life Nigeria, where he now works in housing construction.

== Career statistics ==
=== Club ===
Appearances and goals by club, season and competition
Club	Season	League			National cup (Note: Includes Nigerian FA Cup, Polish Cup, Greek Cup)		League cup (Note: Includes Polish League Cup, Greek League Cup, Football League Cup)		Continental		Total	
Club	Season	Division	Apps	Goals	Apps	Goals	Apps	Goals	Apps	Goals	Apps	Goals
Jasper United	1996	Nigeria Professional League	32	17	—		—		—		32	17
Jasper United	1997	Nigeria Professional League	8	3	—		—		—		8	3
Jasper United	Total		40	20	—		—		—		40	20
Polonia Warsaw	1997–98	Ekstraklasa	13	1	2	0	—		—		15	1
Polonia Warsaw	1998–99	Ekstraklasa	16	4	0	0	—		3 (Note: Appearance(s) in UEFA Cup)	1	19	5
Polonia Warsaw	1999–2000	Ekstraklasa	24	12	4	1	4	1	4 (Note: Appearances in UEFA Intertoto Cup)	1	36	15
Polonia Warsaw	2000–01	Ekstraklasa	13	3	1	2	2	1	6 (Note: Four appearances and three goals in UEFA Champions League, two appearances in UEFA Cup)	3	22	9
Polonia Warsaw	Total		66	20	7	3	6	2	13	5	92	30
Panathinaikos	2000–01	Alpha Ethniki	8	4	1	0	—		0	0	9	4
Panathinaikos	2001–02	Alpha Ethniki	19	9	5	1	—		10 (Note: Appearances in UEFA Champions League)	2	34	12
Panathinaikos	2002–03	Alpha Ethniki	19	8	2	1	—		9	4	30	13
Panathinaikos	2003–04	Alpha Ethniki	9	3	2	1	—		2 (Note: One appearance in UEFA Champions League, one appearance in UEFA Cup)	0	13	4
Panathinaikos	2004–05	Alpha Ethniki	13	0	—		—		3	1	16	1
Panathinaikos	2005–06	Alpha Ethniki	6	0	—		—		2	2	8	2
Panathinaikos	Total		74	24	10	3	0	0	26	9	110	36
Portsmouth	2005–06	Premier League	2	0	—		—		—		2	0
Skoda Xanthi	2006–07	Super League Greece	5	0	3	0	—		1	0	9	0
APOP Kinyras Peyias	2007–08	Cypriot First Division	17	6	—		—		—		17	6
Henan Construction	2008	Chinese Super League	26	12	—		—		—		26	12
Henan Construction	2009	Chinese Super League	18	10	—		—		—		18	10
Henan Construction	2010	Chinese Super League	19	2	—		—		—		19	2
Henan Construction	Total		63	24	—		—		—		63	24
Veria	2011–12	Football League (Greece)	9	1	—		—		—		9	1
Career total			276	95	20	6	6	2	40	14	342	117

=== International ===
Appearances and goals by national team and year
National team	Year	Apps	Goals
Poland	2000	5	3
Poland	2001	8	7
Poland	2002	8	1
Poland	2003	3	0
Poland	2004	1	0
Total		25	11

Scores and results list Poland's goal tally first, score column indicates score after each Olisadebe goal.

List of international goals scored by Emmanuel Olisadebe
No.	Date	Venue	Opponent	Score	Result	Competition
1	16 August 2000	Stadionul Cotroceni, Bucharest, Romania	Romania	1–1	1–1	Friendly
2	2 September 2000	Olympic Stadium, Kyiv, Ukraine	Ukraine	1–0	3–1	2002 FIFA World Cup qualification
3	2 September 2000	Olympic Stadium, Kyiv, Ukraine	Ukraine	2–1	3–1	2002 FIFA World Cup qualification
4	28 February 2001	Antonis Papadopoulos Stadium, Larnaka, Cyprus	Switzerland	1–0	4–0	Friendly
5	24 March 2001	Ullevaal Stadion, Oslo, Norway	Norway	1–0	3–2	2002 FIFA World Cup qualification
6	24 March 2001	Ullevaal Stadion, Oslo, Norway	Norway	2–0	3–2	2002 FIFA World Cup qualification
7	28 March 2001	Stadion Wojska Polskiego, Warsaw, Poland	Armenia	2–0	4–0	2002 FIFA World Cup qualification
8	2 June 2001	Millennium Stadium, Cardiff, Wales	Wales	1–1	2–1	2002 FIFA World Cup qualification
9	1 September 2001	Stadion Śląski, Chorzów, Poland	Norway	2–0	3–0	2002 FIFA World Cup qualification
10	6 October 2001	Stadion Śląski, Chorzów, Poland	Ukraine	1–0	1–1	2002 FIFA World Cup qualification
11	14 June 2002	Daejeon World Cup Stadium, Daejeon, South Korea	United States	1–0	3–1	2002 FIFA World Cup

== Honours ==
Polonia Warsaw

- Ekstraklasa: 1999–2000
- Polish Super Cup: 2000
- Polish League Cup: 1999–2000

Panathinaikos

- Alpha Ethniki: 2003–04
- Greek Cup: 2003–04

Individual

- Polish Footballer of the Year: 2001
- Fourth-best Polish sportsman of the Year: 2002
- Nominated for the FIFA World Player of the Year: 2002
