= Poulopoulos =

Poulopoulos is a surname. Notable people with the surname include:

- Georgios Poulopoulos (born 1975), Greek footballer
- Giannis Poulopoulos (1941–2020), Greek singer-songwriter
- Pandelis Pouliopoulos (1900–1943), Greek communist
