= 2005–06 Portsmouth F.C. season =

Portsmouth
2005–06 season
- Chairman: Milan Mandarić
- Manager: Alain Perrin (until 24 November); Joe Jordan (caretaker); Harry Redknapp (from 7 December)
- Stadium: Fratton Park
- FA Premier League: 17th
- FA Cup: Fourth round
- League Cup: Second round
- Top goalscorer: League: Lomana LuaLua (7); All: Lomana LuaLua; Gary O'Neil; Matthew Taylor (7)
- Highest home attendance: 20,240 vs. Liverpool (7 May 2006)
- Lowest home attendance: 19,030 vs. Charlton Athletic (22 October 2005)
- Average home league attendance: 19,635

During the 2005–06 season, Portsmouth competed in the FA Premier League. It was Portsmouth's third consecutive season in English football's top-flight.

== Season summary ==
Manager Alain Perrin was sacked in November with Portsmouth struggling in the relegation zone. Joe Jordan was appointed caretaker manager after the sacking of Perrin. He was replaced by Harry Redknapp, who had walked out of arch-rivals Southampton after being refused permission by the club to talk to Portsmouth about the managerial vacancy. For a while it looked as if Redknapp's efforts were in vain, with Portsmouth eight points adrift of safety at the end of February. However, by the end of March that had been cut to just three (with a game in hand over seventeenth-placed West Bromwich Albion) and eventually Portsmouth managed to secure survival with a 2–1 win at Wigan Athletic to send West Brom and Birmingham City down.

== Kit ==
Portsmouth signed a deal with Jako to produce the club's kit. Oki became the kit sponsors. The strip was manufactured by Pompey Sport, but after the kit deal with Jako, they were rebadged with its logo. The home shirt was atypical for Portsmouth, as it had a large white space under the collar on the rear where players' names were printed. The away was red and gold, whilst the third was white and navy. The white strip was only worn three times, away at Manchester United, Aston Villa and West Ham United respectively.

== Final league table ==
Pos	Team	Pld	W	D	L	GF	GA	GD	Pts	Qualification or relegation
15	Manchester City	38	13	4	21	43	48	−5	43	
16	Aston Villa	38	10	12	16	42	55	−13	42	
17	Portsmouth	38	10	8	20	37	62	−25	38	
18	Birmingham City (R)	38	8	10	20	28	50	−22	34	Relegation to the Football League Championship
19	West Bromwich Albion (R)	38	7	9	22	31	58	−27	30	Relegation to the Football League Championship

Source: Barclays Premier League
Rules for classification: 1) points; 2) goal difference; 3) number of goals scored.
(R) Relegated

== Results ==
Portsmouth's score comes first

=== Legend ===
Win	Draw	Loss

=== FA Premier League ===
==== Results summary ====
Overall								Home						Away					
Pld	W	D	L	GF	GA	GD	Pts	W	D	L	GF	GA	GD	W	D	L	GF	GA	GD
38	10	8	20	37	62	−25	38	5	7	7	17	24	−7	5	1	13	20	38	−18

Last updated: 13 December 2019.
Source: 11v11

==== Results per matchday ====
Matchday	1	2	3	4	5	6	7	8	9	10	11	12	13	14	15	16	17	18	19	20	21	22	23	24	25	26	27	28	29	30	31	32	33	34	35	36	37	38
Ground	H	A	H	A	A	H	A	H	A	H	A	H	A	H	A	A	H	H	A	H	A	H	A	H	A	H	A	A	H	A	A	H	H	H	A	H	A	H
Result	L	L	D	L	W	D	L	D	D	L	W	L	L	L	L	L	W	D	L	W	L	L	L	D	L	L	L	L	W	W	W	D	D	W	L	W	W	L
Position	20	19	17	18	15	14	17	15	15	17	14	15	17	17	18	19	18	18	18	18	18	18	19	19	19	19	19	19	19	19	18	18	18	17	17	17	17	17

Updated to match(es) played on 7 May 2006. Source: Statto.com
A = Away; H = Home; W = Win; D = Draw; L = Loss

Date	Opponent	Venue	Result	Attendance	Scorers
13 August 2005	Tottenham Hotspur	H	0–2	20,215	
20 August 2005	West Bromwich Albion	A	1–2	24,404	Robert
23 August 2005	Aston Villa	H	1–1	19,778	LuaLua
27 August 2005	Manchester City	A	1–2	41,022	Viáfara
10 September 2005	Everton	A	1–0	36,831	Ferguson (own goal)
17 September 2005	Birmingham City	H	1–1	19,319	LuaLua
24 September 2005	Bolton Wanderers	A	0–1	23,134	
1 October 2005	Newcastle United	H	0–0	20,220	
15 October 2005	Middlesbrough	A	1–1	26,551	O'Neil
22 October 2005	Charlton Athletic	H	1–2	19,030	Silva
29 October 2005	Sunderland	A	4–1	34,926	Vukić, Taylor (2), Silva
5 November 2005	Wigan Athletic	H	0–2	19,102	
19 November 2005	Liverpool	A	0–3	44,394	
26 November 2005	Chelsea	H	0–2	20,182	
3 December 2005	Manchester United	A	0–3	67,684	
12 December 2005	Tottenham Hotspur	A	1–3	36,141	LuaLua
17 December 2005	West Bromwich Albion	H	1–0	20,052	Todorov
26 December 2005	West Ham United	H	1–1	20,168	O'Neil
28 December 2005	Arsenal	A	0–4	38,223	
31 December 2005	Fulham	H	1–0	19,101	O'Neil
2 January 2006	Blackburn Rovers	A	1–2	19,521	Taylor
14 January 2006	Everton	H	0–1	20,094	
21 January 2006	Birmingham City	A	0–5	29,138	
1 February 2006	Bolton Wanderers	H	1–1	19,128	Karadas
4 February 2006	Newcastle United	A	0–2	51,627	
11 February 2006	Manchester United	H	1–3	20,206	Taylor
25 February 2006	Chelsea	A	0–2	42,254	
4 March 2006	Aston Villa	A	0–1	30,194	
11 March 2006	Manchester City	H	2–1	19,556	Mendes (2)
18 March 2006	West Ham United	A	4–2	34,837	LuaLua, Davis, Mendes, Todorov
1 April 2006	Fulham	A	3–1	22,322	O'Neil (2), LuaLua
8 April 2006	Blackburn Rovers	H	2–2	20,048	LuaLua, Todorov
12 April 2006	Arsenal	H	1–1	20,230	LuaLua
15 April 2006	Middlesbrough	H	1–0	20,204	O'Neil
17 April 2006	Charlton Athletic	A	1–2	25,419	D'Alessandro
22 April 2006	Sunderland	H	2–1	20,078	Todorov, Taylor (pen)
29 April 2006	Wigan Athletic	A	2–1	21,126	Mwaruwari, Taylor (pen)
7 May 2006	Liverpool	H	1–3	20,240	Koroman

=== FA Cup ===
Round	Date	Opponent	Venue	Result	Attendance	Goalscorers
R3	7 January 2006	Ipswich Town	A	1–0	15,593	Silva
R4	29 January 2006	Liverpool	H	1–2	17,247	Davis

=== League Cup ===
Round	Date	Opponent	Venue	Result	Attendance	Goalscorers
R2	20 September 2005	Gillingham	A	2–3 (a.e.t.)	4,903	O'Neil, Taylor

== First-team squad ==
Note: Flags indicate national team as defined under FIFA eligibility rules; some limited exceptions apply. Players may hold more than one non-FIFA nationality.

No.	Pos.	Nation	Player
2	DF	ENG	Linvoy Primus
3	DF	SCG	Dejan Stefanović
4	MF	ARG	Andrés D'Alessandro (on loan from Wolfsburg)
5	DF	IRL	Andy O'Brien
6	DF	DEN	Brian Priske
7	DF	FRA	Grégory Vignal
8	FW	NOR	Azar Karadas (on loan from Benfica)
9	FW	BUL	Svetoslav Todorov
10	MF	CRO	Ivica Mornar
11	DF	FRA	Noé Pamarot
14	MF	ENG	Matthew Taylor
15	GK	ENG	Jamie Ashdown
16	DF	ENG	Andy Griffin
17	FW	FRA	Vincent Péricard
18	MF	SEN	Aliou Cissé

No.	Pos.	Nation	Player
19	FW	ZAM	Collins Mbesuma
20	MF	SCG	Ognjen Koroman (on loan from FC Terek Grozny)
21	MF	FRA	Franck Songo'o
22	MF	SCO	Richard Hughes
23	FW	POL	Emmanuel Olisadebe
24	MF	ENG	Wayne Routledge (on loan from Tottenham Hotspur)
25	FW	ZIM	Benjani Mwaruwari
26	MF	ENG	Gary O'Neil
28	MF	ENG	Sean Davis
29	GK	ITA	Andrea Guatelli
30	MF	POR	Pedro Mendes
32	FW	COD	Lomana LuaLua
33	GK	IRL	Dean Kiely
40	MF	SEN	Salif Diao (on loan from Liverpool)
43	MF	ENG	Scott Harris

=== Left club during season ===
Note: Flags indicate national team as defined under FIFA eligibility rules; some limited exceptions apply. Players may hold more than one non-FIFA nationality.

No.	Pos.	Nation	Player
1	GK	NED	Sander Westerveld (on loan to Everton)
4	MF	COL	Jhon Viáfara (on loan to Real Sociedad)
11	MF	FRA	Laurent Robert (on loan from Newcastle United)
20	MF	GRE	Giannis Skopelitis (on loan from Egaleo)
24	DF	WAL	Richard Duffy (on loan to Coventry City)
27	FW	SLO	Aleksandar Rodić (on loan to Kayserispor)
31	FW	URU	Darío Silva (released)

No.	Pos.	Nation	Player
33	GK	GRE	Konstantinos Chalkias (to Real Murcia)
34	FW	ENG	James Keene (on loan to GAIS)
35	DF	ENG	Gary Silk (on loan to Boston United)
38	MF	SCG	Zvonimir Vukić (on loan from Shakhtar Donetsk)
—	DF	IRL	Marc Wilson (on loan to Yeovil Town)
—	MF	NIR	Daryl Fordyce (on loan to Bournemouth)

== Reserve squad ==
Note: Flags indicate national team as defined under FIFA eligibility rules; some limited exceptions apply. Players may hold more than one non-FIFA nationality.

No.	Pos.	Nation	Player
—	GK	CAN	Asmir Begović
—	DF	ENG	Jason Pearce

No.	Pos.	Nation	Player
—	FW	ENG	Liam Horsted

== Statistics ==
=== Starting 11 ===
Considering starts in all competitions

- GK: #15, (England) Jamie Ashdown, 18
- RB: #2, (England) Linvoy Primus, 21
- CB: #5, (Republic of Ireland) Andy O'Brien, 32
- CB: #3, (Serbia and Montenegro) Dejan Stefanović, 30
- LB: #6, (Denmark) Brian Priske, 28
- RM: #26, (England) Gary O'Neil, 39
- CM: #22, (Scotland) Richard Hughes, 24
- CM: #28, (England) Sean Davis, 17
- LM: #14, (England) Matthew Taylor, 35
- CF: #25, (Zimbabwe) Benjani Mwaruwari, 16
- CF: #32, (Democratic Republic of the Congo) , Lomana LuaLua, 25

== Transfers ==
=== In ===
- (Republic of Ireland) Andy O'Brien - (England) Newcastle United, £2,000,000, 13 June
- (France) Laurent Robert - (England) Newcastle United, undisclosed, 19 June
- (Colombia) Jhon Viáfara - (Colombia) Once Caldas, £1,600,000, 7 July
- (France) Grégory Vignal - (England) Liverpool, free, 12 July
- (Zambia) Collins Mbesuma - (South Africa) Kaizer Chiefs, undisclosed, 12 July
- (Netherlands) Sander Westerveld - (Spain) Real Sociedad, free, 22 July
- (Norway) Azar Karadas - (Portugal) Benfica, loan, 22 July
- (Denmark) Brian Priske - (Belgium) Genk, undisclosed, 22 August
- (Serbia and Montenegro) Zvonimir Vukić - (Ukraine) Shakhtar Donetsk, undisclosed, 29 August
- (Uruguay) Darío Silva - (Spain) Sevilla FC, free, 31 August
- (Cameroon) Franck Songo'o - (Spain) Barcelona, £205,000, 31 August
- (Senegal) Salif Diao - (England) Liverpool, season loan, 31 August
- (Poland) Emmanuel Olisadebe - (Greece) Panathinaikos, undisclosed, 4 January
- (Zimbabwe) Benjani Mwaruwari - (France) Auxerre, £4,100,000, 5 January
- (France) Noé Pamarot - (England) Tottenham Hotspur, £2,000,000, 12 January

- (Portugal) Pedro Mendes - (England) Tottenham Hotspur, £3,500,000, 12 January

- (England) Sean Davis - (England) Tottenham Hotspur, £2,000,000, 12 January

- (Republic of Ireland) Dean Kiely - (England) Charlton Athletic, undisclosed, 25 January
- (England) Wayne Routledge - (England) Tottenham Hotspur, season loan, 30 January
- (Serbia and Montenegro) Ognjen Koroman - (Russia) Terek Grozny, loan, 30 January
- (Argentina) Andrés D'Alessandro - (Germany) VfL Wolfsburg, season loan, 31 January

=== Out ===
- (Czech Republic) Patrik Berger - (England) Aston Villa, free, 17 May
- (Nigeria) Yakubu - (England) Middlesbrough, £7,500,000, 23 May
- (Wales) Richard Duffy - (England) Coventry City, season loan, 7 June
- (England) Rowan Vine - (England) Luton Town, £250,000, 4 July
- (England) Steve Stone - (England) Leeds United, free, 29 June
- (Senegal) Diomansy Kamara - (England) West Bromwich Albion, £1,500,000, 26 July
- (Jamaica) Ricardo Fuller - (England) Southampton, £90,000 (rising to £340,000 if Southampton gain promotion), 28 July
- (Trinidad and Tobago) Shaka Hislop - (England) West Ham United, free, 29 July
- (Netherlands) Arjan de Zeeuw - (England) Wigan Athletic, £90,000, 11 August
- (England) David Unsworth - (England) Sheffield United, free, (Note: A clause was included in Unsworth's transfer that United would only pay a fee to Portsmouth if they gained promotion; they did, but the fee paid is undisclosed.) 22 August
- (Greece) Kostas Chalkias - released (later joined (Spain) Real Murcia), 19 January
- (Colombia) Jhon Viáfara - (Spain) Real Sociedad, loan, January
- (Uruguay) Darío Silva - released, 13 February
- (Netherlands) Sander Westerveld - (England) Everton, 28-day loan, 24 February
- (England) James Keene - (Sweden) GAIS, loan, March
- (Australia) Hayden Foxe - released
- (Slovenia) Aleksander Rodić - (Turkey) Kayserispor, loan
- (Greece) Giannis Skopelitis - (Greece) Egaleo, loan
- (England) Gary Silk - (England) Boston United

Transfers in: ▼£16,250,000
Transfers out: ▲£9,450,000
Total spending: ▼£6,800,000
