= Antonios Nikopolidis =

Greek footballer and manager

Antonis Nikopolidis
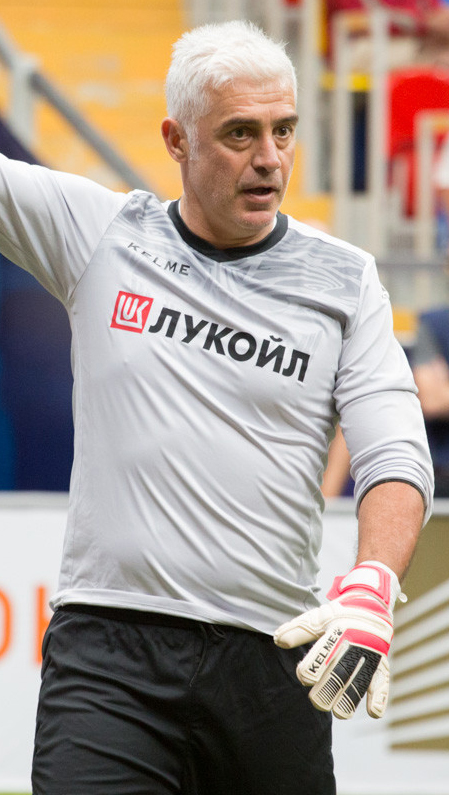
- Nikopolidis playing in a legends match in 2018

Personal information
- Full name: Antonios Nikopolidis
- Date of birth: 14 January 1971 (age 55)
- Place of birth: Arta, Greece
- Height: 1.87 m (6 ft 2 in)
- Position: Goalkeeper

Youth career
- 1985–1989: Anagennisi Arta

Senior career*
Years	Team	Apps	(Gls)
1987–1989	Anagennisi Arta	49	(0)
1989–2004	Panathinaikos	189	(0)
2004–2011	Olympiacos	180	(0)
Total		418	(0)

International career
1999–2008	Greece	90	(0)

Managerial career
- 2012–2013: Olympiacos (assistant)
- 2013: Olympiacos (caretaker)
- 2014–2015: Olympiacos (assistant)
- 2015–2019: Greece U21
- 2019–2020: Olympiacos U19
- 2022–2023: Proodeftiki
- 2024–2025: Panionios
Medal record
Men's football
Representing Greece
UEFA European Championship
Winner	2004
- * Club domestic league appearances and goals

Antonis Nikopolidis (Greek: Αντώνης Νικοπολίδης; born 14 January 1971) is a Greek professional football manager and former player.

He is regarded among the best Greek goalkeepers of all time having been awarded the most goalkeeper caps in the Greece national team and playing an integral part in the UEFA Euro 2004 triumph.

== Early life ==
Nikopolidis grew up in Vigla, a village near Arta in the region of Epirus. He started playing in the academies of his village's amateur club as a teenager. He used to play as an attacker and first played as a goalkeeper because his team was left without a player in that position in a match.

== Playing career ==
=== Club ===
==== Anagennisi Arta ====
Nikopolidis made his first steps at his local team of Anagennisi Arta, from which he was transferred to Panathinaikos in the summer of 1989.

==== Panathinaikos ====
He made his debut during the 1990–91 season in a match against his future club, Olympiacos. In his early years as a Panathinaikos player, he was a back-up for Józef Wandzik. In 1995, he played five games as Panathinaikos won the championship and three as they retained it the following year. However, it wasn't until the 1997–98 season that he established himself as the first choice goalkeeper at the age of 26. In the 2002 Champions league campaign, he helped the club reach the quarter-finals. In the 2003–04 season, he lost his place to Konstantinos Chalkias when his contract negotiations broke down.

Panathinaikos offered him €400K per year which, although a pay-rise, he thought was not in line with his contributions to the team over the past 15 years nor with his current market value. As he did not immediately accept the offer the management became suspicious and decided to relegate him to the bench for the rest of the 2003–04 season. The Greek sports media and Panathinaikos fans at first took his side in the conflict and criticised president Vardinogiannis.

Just before UEFA Euro 2004, rumours were circulating that Nikopolidis had been approached by arch-rivals Olympiacos. It was discovered later that he had signed an agreement just before the tournament begun earning him €600K per year for three years. After that, the fans' disappointment in him was displayed during the celebrations following the team's 2003–04 season double when Nikopolidis, while raising the trophy, was booed by the majority of the crowd.

==== Olympiacos ====
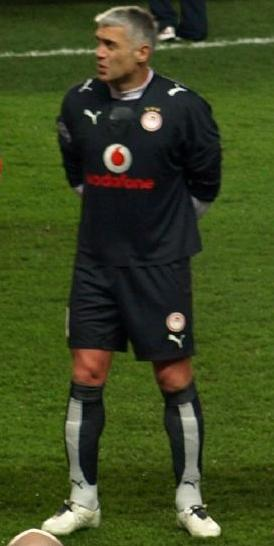
Nikopolidis with Olympiacos in 2008

Soon after being instrumental in UEFA Euro 2004 helping Greece to lift the trophy, Nikopolidis joined Olympiacos, making an immediate impact for his once rival team. Keeping a clean sheet in the first derby against his former club in the process, he went on to win two Doubles in a row, making him the only Greek player to win three consecutive doubles with two different clubs.

At his new team, Nikopolidis also earned a reputation for making game-winning saves in the most important games. Displaying his penalty-saving abilities, Nikopolidis saved three penalty kicks against Roma, Real Madrid, and Rosenborg BK, making him undefeated from the penalty spot in UEFA Champions League football in the Olympiacos shirt. In the 2007–08 season, he also equaled the Greek league record for the most penalty kicks saved in one season, which included saves against PAOK and former club Panathinaikos. Nikopolidis announced his plans to retire at the end of the 2009–10 season.

However, he took back his decision to stop his career after Sokratis Kokkalis's insistence. The veteran goalkeeper stated that he would delay his retirement for one more year, to retire as champion. He signed an extension on 16 June that would keep him at Olympiacos for the 2010–11 season.

He also took part in the international match "8th Match Against Poverty", on 14 December 2010, in Karaiskakis Stadium in Greece, as the UNDP team's goalkeeper.

In January 2011, IFFHS released a list with the best goalkeepers of the first decade, and Nikopolidis was in. He was also listed as one of the best goalkeepers of the years 1987 to 2011.

On 20 March 2011, Olympiacos won the championship in a 6–0 win against rivals AEK Athens, in Karaiskakis Stadium.

He made his final appearance on 17 April 2011 in a home 6–0 victory against AEL in Karaiskakis Stadium. As a final curtain call, he was replaced by Balázs Megyeri in the last minutes, so he could wave goodbye to the Olympiacos fans.

As the Olympiacos captain, he was the player to accept the championship trophy, after the match.

=== International ===
Nikopolidis made his debut for the Greece national football team on 18 August 1999 against El Salvador.

He played in the qualifying rounds of the 2002 FIFA World Cup and Euro 2004 where he excelled as Greece qualified for the finals. Nikopolidis was one of the cornerstones of the Greek win in Portugal, where he kept three clean sheets in the knockout stages. He was also voted goalkeeper of the Euro 2004 All Star team.

On 15 June 2008, Nikopolidis announced his retirement from international football after Euro 2008, claiming that he had made this decision before the tournament started, and also stating that it is about time for a major change in the Greece national team.

== Managerial career ==
After retirement, Nikopolidis became the assistant manager of Olympiacos in 2012.

He was promoted to manager in January 2013 on an interim basis following the dismissal of Leonardo Jardim. After the arrival of Míchel, he remained in the team as his assistant.

After the end of 2012–13 season, Nikopolidis left Olympiacos in order to start his career as a head coach.

On 1 October 2015, he was named as manager of the Greece national under-21 football team.

== Style of play ==
Despite not being particularly tall or agile, his excellent positional sense made him an effective shot-stopper and his ability to read and understand the game helped him rush quickly off his line in order to face one on one situations or act as a sweeper-keeper.

== Career statistics ==
=== Club ===
Appearances and goals by club, season and competition
Club	Season	League			Greek Cup		Europe		Total	
Club	Season	Division	Apps	Goals	Apps	Goals	Apps	Goals	Apps	Goals
Anagennisi Arta	1987–88	Gamma Ethniki	16	0	–		–		16	0
Anagennisi Arta	1988–89	Gamma Ethniki	33	0	–		–		33	0
Anagennisi Arta	Totai		49	0	–		–		49	0
Panathinaikos	1989–90	Alpha Ethniki	5	0	–		–		5	0
Panathinaikos	1990–91	Alpha Ethniki	0	0	–		–		0	0
Panathinaikos	1991–92	Alpha Ethniki	0	0	–		–		0	0
Panathinaikos	1992–93	Alpha Ethniki	0	0	–		–		0	0
Panathinaikos	1993–94	Alpha Ethniki	0	0	–		–		0	0
Panathinaikos	1994–95	Alpha Ethniki	5	0	–		–		5	0
Panathinaikos	1995–96	Alpha Ethniki	3	0	–		–		3	0
Panathinaikos	1996–97	Alpha Ethniki	7	0	1	0	–		8	0
Panathinaikos	1997–98	Alpha Ethniki	25	0	2	0	–		27	0
Panathinaikos	1998–99	Alpha Ethniki	19	0	1	0	–		20	0
Panathinaikos	1999–00	Alpha Ethniki	28	0	2	0	6	0	36	0
Panathinaikos	2000–01	Alpha Ethniki	25	0	2	0	9	0	34	0
Panathinaikos	2001–02	Alpha Ethniki	26	0	2	0	16	0	44	0
Panathinaikos	2002–03	Alpha Ethniki	28	0	1	0	10	0	39	0
Panathinaikos	2003–04	Alpha Ethniki	18	0	1	0	5	0	24	0
Panathinaikos	Total		189	0	12	0	46	0	245	0
Olympiacos	2004–05	Alpha Ethniki	29	0	6	0	10	0	45	0
Olympiacos	2005–06	Alpha Ethniki	29	0	7	0	5	0	41	0
Olympiacos	2006–07	Super League Greece	28	0	2	0	6	0	36	0
Olympiacos	2007–08	Super League Greece	28	0	3	0	8	0	39	0
Olympiacos	2008–09	Super League Greece	28	0	7	0	10	0	45	0
Olympiacos	2009–10	Super League Greece	32	0	0	0	12	0	44	0
Olympiacos	2010–11	Super League Greece	6	0	3	0	3	0	12	0
Olympiacos	Total		180	0	28	0	54	0	263	0
Career total			418	0	40	0	100	0	558	0

=== International ===
Appearances and goals by national team and year
National team	Year	Apps	Goals
Greece	1999	5	0
Greece	2000	7	0
Greece	2001	5	0
Greece	2002	10	0
Greece	2003	11	0
Greece	2004	16	0
Greece	2005	13	0
Greece	2006	9	0
Greece	2007	7	0
Greece	2008	7	0
Total		90	0

== Managerial statistics ==
As of match played 6 June 2019.

Team	From	To	Record					
Team	From	To	M	W	D	L	Win %	Ref.
Olympiacos (caretaker)	19 January 2013	4 February 2013	4	3	0	1	75.00	
Olympiacos (caretaker)	6 January 2015	8 January 2015	1	1	0	0	100.00	
Greece U21	1 October 2015	6 June 2019	31	14	5	12	45.16	
Proodeftiki	6 December 2022	9 March 2023	6	2	1	3	33.33	
Total			42	20	6	16	47.62	—

== Honours ==
=== Player ===
Panathinaikos

- Alpha Ethniki: 1989–90, 1990–91, 1994–95, 1995–96, 2003–04
- Greek Cup: 1990–91, 1992–93, 1993–94, 1994–95, 2003–04
- Greek Super Cup: 1993, 1994

Olympiacos

- Alpha Ethniki/Super League Greece: 2004–05, 2005–06, 2006–07, 2007–08, 2008–09, 2010–11
- Greek Cup: 2004–05, 2005–06, 2007–08, 2008–09
- Greek Super Cup: 2007

Greece

- UEFA European Football Championship: 2004

Individual

- Alpha Ethniki/Super League Greece Goalkeeper of the Season: 1999–2000, 2001–02, 2002–03, 2003–04, 2004–05, 2005–06, 2007–08, 2008–09 (Record)
- UEFA European Football Championship Team of the Tournament Member: 2004
