= Gary Silk =

English footballer and physiotherapist

Personal information
- Full name: Gary Lee Silk
- Date of birth: 13 September 1984 (age 42)
- Place of birth: Newport, Isle of Wight
- Position: Right back

Team information
- Current team: Leicester City (first team physiotherapist)

Senior career*
Years	Team	Apps	(Gls)
2003–2006	Portsmouth	0	(0)
2003–2004	→ Barnet (loan)	1	(0)
2004–2005	→ Wycombe Wanderers (loan)	22	(0)
2006	→ Boston United (loan)	14	(0)
2006–2008	Notts County	63	(2)
2008–2011	Mansfield Town	102	(2)
2011–2012	Grimsby Town	24	(0)
2012–2013	Boston United	26	(0)
2013	Boston United	7	(0)
Total		259	(4)
- * Club domestic league appearances and goals

Gary Lee Silk (born 13 September 1984) is an English former professional footballer and first team physiotherapist for EFL Championship club Leicester City.

As a player, he was a right back who played between 2003 and 2013 for Portsmouth, Barnet, Wycombe Wanderers, Boston United, Notts County, Mansfield Town and Grimsby Town.

== Playing career ==
Born in Newport, Isle of Wight, Silk started his career as a youth player at Portsmouth. He made his professional debut as a player in December 2003 whilst on loan at Barnet, and went on to spend much of the 2004/05 season on loan at Wycombe Wanderers. He was a presence in Wycombe's quarter-final Football League Trophy run of 2004–05.

At the end of the 2005–06 season, he was released by Portsmouth and joined Notts County, before being released on 13 May 2008.

He joined their neighbours Mansfield Town and soon became a fans' favourite at Field Mill. He won every Player of the Year Award available and signed a two-year deal with the Stags, despite having an offer from a Football League club.

In June 2011, he left Mansfield Town after three seasons, to join Grimsby Town, he would become Grimsby's first new signing for 2011–12. After an injury plagued season, in which Silk only featured 24 times in the league, he was released by the club on 3 May 2012.

In July 2012, he joined Lincoln City on trial. In August, he signed a one-year deal with Jason Lee's Boston United. Following a managerial change at the club, new United boss Graham Drury released Silk on 12 February 2013, after his university commitments had prevented him from training on Thursday nights. Drury added: "I need all my players to train on Thursday nights". Silk played 26 times for The Pilgrims and made his final appearance against local rivals Gainsborough Trinity.

On 14 March, it was announced on the Boston United website that Silk, whose registration had never been cancelled, was being brought back to the club by new manager Dennis Greene. Silk was released by Boston for a second time at the end of the 2012–13 season.

== Personal life ==
Whilst playing for Mansfield, Silk gained a diploma in sports massage from Loughborough College.

== Physiotherapist ==
He gained experience by joining the medical staff at Sheffield Wednesday, before being appointed first team masseur at Leicester City in 2013. He graduated from the University of Salford in July 2016 with a bachelor's degree in Physiotherapy and was appointed as a physiotherapist for the first team.

== Honours ==
=== Grimsby Town ===
- Lincolnshire Senior Cup: Winner, 2011–12

=== Mansfield Town ===
- Player of the Season: 2008–09
