= Xenofon Gittas =

Greek footballer

Personal information
- Full name: Xenofon Gittas
- Date of birth: 22 June 1979 (age 47)
- Place of birth: Ioannina, Greece
- Height: 1.65 m (5 ft 5 in)
- Position: Attacking midfielder

Youth career
- PAS Giannina

Senior career*
Years	Team	Apps	(Gls)
1997–2003	PAS Giannina	135	(22)
2003–2004	Panathinaikos	4	(1)
2004	Kallithea	12	(0)
2004–2006	Kerkyra	50	(2)
2006–2007	PAS Giannina	19	(1)
2007–2009	Panthrakikos	34	(2)
2009–2010	AEK Larnaca	15	(0)
2010	Ilioupoli	15	(0)
2010–2011	Rodos	25	(3)
2011	Paniliakos	4	(0)
2012–2013	Doxa Kranoula	24	(4)
2013–2014	Anagennisi Karditsas	35	(3)
2014–2016	Ethnikos Filippiada		
2016–2017	Anatoli Ioannina		
- * Club domestic league appearances and goals

Xenofon Gittas (Greek: Ξενοφών Γήτας; born 22 June 1979) is a former Greek football midfielder.

== Career ==
Born in Ioannina, Gittas has previously played for PAS Giannina, Panathinaikos, Kerkyra, Kallithea, Panthrakikos, AEK Larnaca, Ilioupoli, Rodos, Paniliakos and Doxa Kranoula . The midfielder led Panthrakikos to promotion to the Super League Greece following the 2007–08 season.

== Honours ==
Panathinaikos

- Alpha Ethniki: 2003-04
