= 2003–04 Alpha Ethniki =

68th season of top-tier football league in Greece

Alpha Ethniki
- Season: 2003–04
- Dates: 23 August 2003 – 22 May 2004
- Champions: Panathinaikos; 19th Greek title
- Relegated: Akratitos; Paniliakos; Proodeftiki
- Champions League: Panathinaikos; Olympiacos; PAOK
- UEFA Cup: AEK Athens; Egaleo; Panionios
- Matches: 240
- Goals: 557 (2.32 per match)
- Top goalscorer: Giovanni (21 goals)

The 2003–04 Alpha Ethniki was the 68th season of the highest football league of Greece. The season began on 23 August 2003 and ended on 22 May 2004. Panathinaikos won their 19th Greek title and their first one in eight years.

== Teams ==
Promoted from 2002–03 Beta Ethniki	Relegated from 2002–03 Alpha Ethniki
Chalkidona; Paniliakos	Panachaiki; PAS Giannina

=== Stadiums and personnel ===
Location of teams in 2003–04 Alpha Ethniki

Team	Manager^{1}	Location	Stadium	Capacity
AEK Athens	(Bosnia and Herzegovina) Dušan Bajević	Athens	Various^{2}	—
Akratitos	(Greece) Babis Tennes	Athens (Ano Liosia)	Giannis Pathiakakis Stadium	4,944
Aris	(Greece) Makis Katsavakis	Thessaloniki (Charilaou)	Kleanthis Vikelidis Stadium	22,800
Chalkidona	(Greece) Georgios Paraschos	Athens (Peristeri)	Peristeri Stadium	9,035
Egaleo	(Greece) Georgios Chatzaras	Athens (Aigaleo)	Stavros Mavrothalassitis Stadium	8,217
Ionikos	(Greece) Vangelis Vlachos	Piraeus (Nikaia)	Neapoli Stadium	4,999
Iraklis	(Netherlands) Eugène Gerards	Thessaloniki (Efkarpia)	Makedonikos Stadium	8,100
Kallithea	(Greece) Takis Lemonis	Athens (Kallithea)	Grigoris Lambrakis Stadium	4,250
OFI	(Greece) Giorgos Foiros	Heraklion	Theodoros Vardinogiannis Stadium	9,000
Olympiacos	(Ukraine) Oleh Protasov	Athens (Rizoupoli)	Georgios Kamaras Stadium	14,856
Panathinaikos	(Israel) Itzhak Shum	Athens (Ampelokipoi)	Leoforos Alexandras Stadium	16,620
Paniliakos	(Greece) Sakis Tsiolis	Pyrgos	Pyrgos Stadium	6,750
Panionios	(Slovakia) Jozef Bubenko	Athens (Nea Smyrni)	Nea Smyrni Stadium	11,756
PAOK	(Greece) Angelos Anastasiadis	Thessaloniki (Toumba)	Toumba Stadium	28,703
Proodeftiki	(Greece) Soulis Papadopoulos	Piraeus (Nikaia)	Nikaia Municipal Stadium	5,000
Skoda Xanthi	(Greece) Nikos Karageorgiou	Xanthi	Xanthi Ground	9,500

- ^{1} On final match day of the season, played on 22 May 2004.
- ^{2} AEK Athens were played the home matches at the various stadiums in Attica due to the demolition of Nikos Goumas Stadium and the renovation of Athens Olympic Stadium.

== League table ==
Pos	Team	Pld	W	D	L	GF	GA	GD	Pts	Qualification or relegation
1	Panathinaikos (C)	30	24	5	1	62	18	+44	77	Qualification for Champions League group stage
2	Olympiacos	30	24	3	3	70	19	+51	75	Qualification for Champions League group stage
3	PAOK	30	18	6	6	47	27	+20	60	Qualification for Champions League third qualifying round
4	AEK Athens	30	16	7	7	57	32	+25	55	Qualification for UEFA Cup first round
5	Egaleo	30	15	7	8	37	26	+11	52	Qualification for UEFA Cup first round
6	Panionios	30	12	11	7	40	29	+11	47	Qualification for UEFA Cup first round
7	Chalkidona	30	13	6	11	40	39	+1	45	
8	Iraklis	30	12	6	12	40	39	+1	42	
9	Ionikos	30	9	6	15	33	43	−10	33	
10	Skoda Xanthi	30	8	6	16	28	42	−14	30	
11	OFI	30	7	8	15	27	44	−17	29	
12	Kallithea	30	5	12	13	37	42	−5	27 (Note: Head-to-head record: Kallithea–Aris 4–0, Aris–Kallithea 0–1.)	
13	Aris	30	7	6	17	24	46	−22	27	
14	Akratitos (R)	30	5	8	17	31	69	−38	23	Qualification for Relegation play-off
15	Paniliakos (R)	30	4	9	17	28	56	−28	21	Relegation to Beta Ethniki
16	Proodeftiki (R)	30	4	8	18	26	56	−30	20	Relegation to Beta Ethniki

Source: Galanis Sports Data
Rules for classification: 1st points; 2nd head-to-head points; 3rd head-to-head goal difference; 4th decision match.
(C) Champions; (R) Relegated

== Results ==
Home \ Away	AEK	AKR	ARIS	CHA	EGA	ION	IRA	KLT	OFI	OLY	PAO	PNL	PGSS	PAOK	PRO	XAN
AEK Athens		1–1	1–0	1–2	2–2	3–0	4–0	1–1	2–2	0–1	2–2	1–0	0–1	3–1	3–0	3–0
Akratitos	2–7		1–0	2–4	0–2	3–0	1–0	0–0	0–1	0–5	0–0	2–2	1–1	1–2	1–0	1–3
Aris	1–2	3–0		3–0	1–0	1–1	0–0	0–1	1–2	0–3	0–2	1–0	2–1	1–1	3–0	3–2
Chalkidona	2–0	3–1	2–1		0–1	3–2	1–0	1–1	2–1	0–1	0–0	1–3	2–2	1–2	2–1	2–0
Egaleo	0–1	2–1	3–1	2–1		2–0	2–0	1–1	1–0	1–2	2–1	4–1	4–1	0–0	3–0	2–1
Ionikos	0–1	4–1	1–1	0–1	0–0		0–1	3–2	2–0	1–2	1–2	4–2	0–2	0–1	2–1	1–0
Iraklis	2–2	2–1	6–0	1–1	2–1	2–1		2–0	4–0	1–3	0–1	0–0	0–3	3–0	2–1	3–0
Kallithea	1–3	2–2	4–0	2–3	0–1	0–1	1–1		1–2	1–2	0–3	2–2	2–2	0–1	3–1	3–1
OFI	0–2	2–1	3–0	3–1	1–1	1–2	2–2	0–0		0–1	1–3	0–0	1–1	0–3	1–0	1–2
Olympiacos	0–1	7–0	3–0	1–0	3–1	2–2	3–0	2–0	4–1		1–1	1–0	2–0	1–2	4–0	4–1
Panathinaikos	2–1	5–1	1–0	3–0	2–0	2–0	3–0	3–1	1–0	2–2		6–3	3–0	3–0	3–1	1–0
Paniliakos	1–0	0–3	0–0	0–2	0–0	2–2	1–2	0–5	1–1	1–3	0–1		0–0	1–4	4–1	1–0
Panionios	2–2	6–1	2–1	0–0	2–0	0–2	2–1	0–0	1–1	1–2	0–1	3–2		1–0	3–1	1–0
PAOK	3–2	2–2	3–0	2–1	2–0	2–0	2–0	2–1	2–0	0–2	1–2	3–0	2–0		0–0	1–1
Proodeftiki	2–4	1–1	0–0	1–1	0–1	1–1	3–2	1–1	2–0	1–0	1–2	2–0	0–3	1–3		1–1
Skoda Xanthi	1–2	2–0	1–0	2–1	1–2	2–0	0–1	1–1	1–0	1–3	0–1	2–1	0–0	0–0	2–2	

Source: Worldfootball.net
Legend: Blue = home team win; Yellow = draw; Red = away team win.

== Relegation play-off ==
Played at a neutral venue between the 14th-place team in the Alpha Ethniki and the 3rd-place team in the Beta Ethniki.

30 May 2004

Ergotelis	1–0	Akratitos
Sylla 90+1'	Report

Makedonikos Stadium, Thessaloniki
Attendance: 891
Referee: Kyros Vassaras (Thessaloniki)

Ergotelis were promoted to 2004–05 Alpha Ethniki. Akratitos were relegated to 2004–05 Beta Ethniki.

== Top scorers ==
Source: Galanis Sports Data

Rank	Player	Club	Goals
1	(Brazil) Giovanni	Olympiacos	21
2	(Greece) Dimitrios Papadopoulos	Panathinaikos	17
3	(Greece) Dimitris Salpingidis	PAOK	16
4	(Greece) Giorgos Zacharopoulos	Chalkidona	13
4	(Greece) Theofanis Gekas	Kallithea	13
6	(Greece) Nikos Liberopoulos	AEK Athens	12
6	(Greece) Nikos Skarmoutsos	Kallithea	12
8	(Greece) Nikos Machlas	OFI	11
8	(Greece) Vasilios Lakis	AEK Athens	11
8	(Serbia and Montenegro) Predrag Đorđević	Olympiacos	11

== Awards ==
=== Annual awards ===
Annual awards were announced on 9 November 2004.

Award	Winner	Club
Greek Player of the Season	(Greece) Dimitrios Papadopoulos	Panathinaikos
Foreign Player of the Season	(Brazil) Giovanni (Germany) Markus Münch	Olympiacos; Panathinaikos
Young Player of the Season	(Greece) Alexandros Tziolis	Panionios
Goalkeeper of the Season	(Greece) Antonios Nikopolidis	Panathinaikos
Golden Boot	(Brazil) Giovanni	Olympiacos
Manager of the Season	(Greece) Angelos Anastasiadis	PAOK

== Attendances ==
Panathinaikos drew the highest average home attendance in the 2003–04 Alpha Ethniki.

#	Team	Average attendance
1	Panathinaikos	8,857
2	PAOK	8,774
3	Olympiacos	8,019
4	Panionios	2,246
5	Iraklis	2,108
6	AEK Athens	2,012
7	Aris	1,868
8	Paniliakos	1,833
9	OFI	1,828
10	Skoda Xanthi	1,737
11	Kallithea	1,350
12	Proodeftiki	1,307
13	Ionikos	1,230
14	Akratitos	1,201
15	Egaleo	1,105
16	Chalkidona	800
