= Sotirios Kyrgiakos =

Greek footballer (born 1979)

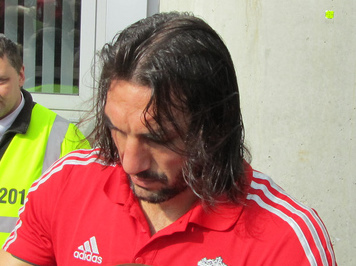
- Kyrgiakos with Liverpool in 2011

Personal information
- Full name: Sotirios Kyrgiakos
- Date of birth: 23 July 1979 (age 47)
- Place of birth: Trikala, Greece
- Height: 1.93 m (6 ft 4 in)
- Position: Centre-back

Youth career
- 1996–1998: Panathinaikos

Senior career*
Years	Team	Apps	(Gls)
1998–2004	Panathinaikos	60	(5)
1999–2001	→ Agios Nikolaos (loan)	53	(3)
2004–2006	Rangers	43	(1)
2006–2008	Eintracht Frankfurt	51	(8)
2008–2009	AEK Athens	20	(0)
2009–2011	Liverpool	30	(3)
2011–2013	VfL Wolfsburg	9	(0)
2012	→ Sunderland (loan)	3	(0)
2014	Sydney Olympic	2	(0)
Total		271	(20)

International career
2002–2010	Greece	61	(4)
- * Club domestic league appearances and goals

Sotirios Kyrgiakos (Greek: Σωτήριος Κυργιάκος, born 23 July 1979) is a Greek former professional footballer who played as a central defender.

== Club career ==
Kyrgiakos made his first football steps with a local team, Thyella Megalochoriou. It did not take long for him to be recognized. At the start of the 1996–97 season he became a member of the Panathinaikos football academy. He is well known as alani. He lived and played football at the Paiania athletic complex, the club's training ground. In the wake of the 1999–2000 season he became a member of Agios Nikolaos, a second division club and won the respect of president Lampros Maris whom Kyrgiakos considers as his second father. He stayed with Agios Nikolaos for two years and in 2001 he took part in the pre-season camp at OFI.

The centre-back injuries at his parent club, Panathinaikos, just before the Third Qualifying round matches with Slavia Prague for the 2000–01 Champions League meant that he had to return to Paiania and become a regular member of the starting line-up. In the 2003–04 season, Kyrgiakos won with Panathinaikos the Greek League and Greek Cup against the eternal rival Olympiacos.

=== Rangers ===
The following January, Kyrgiakos joined Rangers during the 2004–05 season with a view to a permanent deal. With his new club, he won a second consecutive championship and also the Scottish League Cup, scoring two goals in the 5–1 win against Motherwell in the final. He initially failed to agree terms with Rangers and held talks with Everton, Portsmouth and Schalke 04 and the Italian club Genoa before finally agreeing a one-year deal with Rangers. He scored a famous winning goal against F.C. Porto in the UEFA Champions League that year, and ended the season with three goals after also scoring against Peterhead in the Scottish Cup and Dunfermline in the league. He left the club by mutual consent in May 2006 after his contract ran out.

=== Eintracht Frankfurt ===
In June 2006, Kyrgiakos signed a two-year deal with Eintracht Frankfurt. In his first season, he proved to be a fan favourite with some great performances and crucial goals which helped the team avoid relegation. In his second season with the club, with more excellent performances he helped the team finish in ninth position. On 1 July 2008, after his two-year deal expired, Kyrgiakos decided not to renew his contract with the German club, and so was released.

=== AEK Athens ===
On 1 August 2008, Kyrgiakos agreed to sign for AEK Athens on a five-year deal. Due to a number of injuries, Kyrgiakos only made 20 league appearances for AEK but he still established himself as one of the league's best defenders. He played in the Greek Cup Final in 2009 as AEK played Olympiacos in one of the most thrilling games in the history of Greek football. Kyrgiakos was on the losing side as Olympiacos won 15–14 on penalties following a 4–4 draw after extra time. Kyrgiakos did not manage to complete the match though having picked up an injury in the second half of the match. AEK were winning 2–1 at the time.

=== Liverpool ===
==== 2009–10 season ====
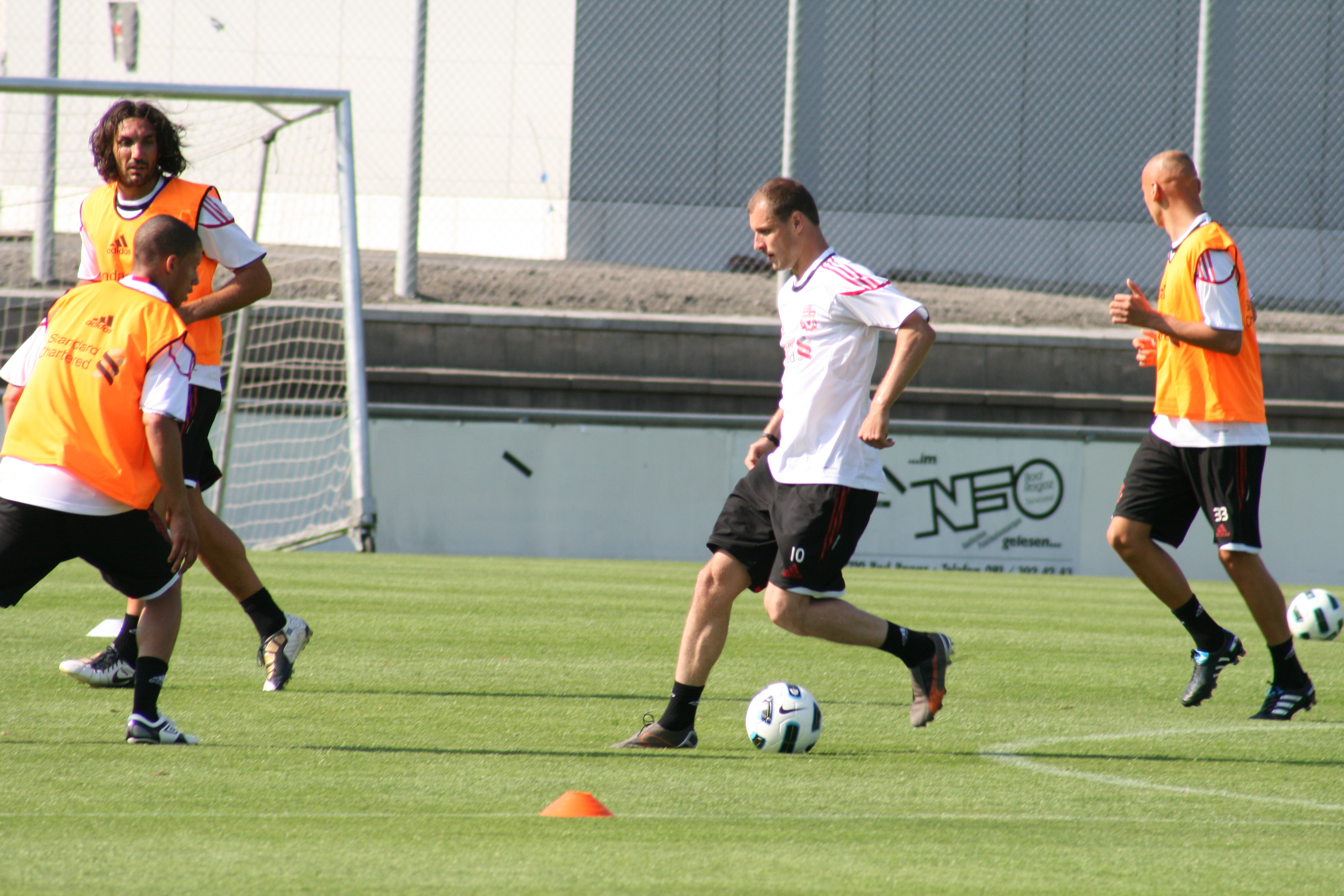
Kyrgiakos in training for Liverpool on the far left

On 21 August 2009, it was announced that he had signed a two-year deal with the option of a further year for Liverpool. The Greek international was handed the number 16 shirt. Kyrgiakos scored his first goal for the club against Stoke City on 16 January 2010 in the 57th minute and also completed the full 90 minutes in a 1–1 draw alongside Martin Škrtel at the Britannia Stadium, later being named man of the match by various British sport sites for his performance in that match. On 17 January 2010, former Liverpool striker and football pundit Stan Collymore wrote an article acknowledging Kyrgiakos' ability, stating that "Kyrgiakos may be keeping Rafa (Benítez) in a job...". Collymore argued that "Sotirios Kyrgiakos could become an unlikely poster boy for the 'new Liverpool.'" He stated, "The big pony-tailed Greek put in a sterling performance at The Britannia and may typify the less football, more grit of the new Reds... And it is no-nonsense men such as Kyrgiakos who like to roll up their sleeves which can keep Rafa in a job right now." Liverpool's very next game was a crunch-match against Tottenham Hotspur, who were perceived as one of the clubs rivalling Liverpool for fourth in the Premier League table. Liverpool won 2–0 and Kyrgiakos put in another solid performance, one described by Sky Sports as "magnificent."

Kyrgiakos' fine form continued in the very next game as Liverpool kept a clean sheet in a 0–0 draw away at Wolverhampton Wanderers on 26 January 2010. An esteemed British sports site rated him as Liverpool's best player that night, he was also voted man of the match in this game by the Liverpool fans on the club's official website. Meanwhile, the legendary Liverpool striker Ian Rush also praised Kyrgiakos, stating that he is ready to fill the void left behind by Sami Hyypiä.

Kyrgiakos' performances had been so impressive that the British sports journalist, Steven Saunders, identified Kyrgiakos as "One To Watch" in the preview to Liverpool's home game against Bolton Wanderers on 30 January 2010. Saunders stated Kyrgiakos' "physical presence in the heart of the defence has been key to a spirited resolve in recent matches. Teams are having to work hard to score against Liverpool, which hadn't always been the case before Kyrgiakos' sustained run in the side." In the build-up to that match, Liverpool manager Rafael Benítez also took time to praise Kyrgiakos and make comparisons between Kyrgiakos' role for the club and Sami Hyypiä's role when he was at the club, suggesting that Kyrgiakos had established himself as an integral part of the Liverpool squad.

Kyrgiakos was voted man of the match against Bolton on 30 January 2010 by Liverpool fans for the third time in four games.

Kyrgiakos' brilliant performances during January 2010 saw him voted as Liverpool's Player of the Month by the club's fans. Kyrgiakos was sent off for a two-footed dive into Marouane Fellaini in the 213th Merseyside derby between Liverpool and Everton on 6 February 2010, which eventually ended 1–0 in Liverpool's favour. Fellaini suffered an ankle injury which kept him out until August 2010.

==== 2010–11 season ====
On 29 July, Kyrgiakos started in Liverpool's UEFA Europa League tie against Rabotnicki Skopje and also featured in both play-off ties against Trabzonspor. On 16 September, he partnered Daniel Agger at centre-back for the Reds' first Europa League group game against Steaua București at Anfield, Liverpool cruising to a 4–1 win. On 22 September, he captained the team that lost to League Two side Northampton Town on penalties in the third round of League Cup.

Kyrgiakos scored his second goal in the Premier League against Blackpool, where Liverpool lost 2–1 at home. As instructed by the manager, Kyrgiakos had recently been played up front as a target man at times when Liverpool had been down in the final minutes and needed a goal. He also scored an important goal against Blackburn Rovers in the Premier League in a 2–1 win at Anfield on 24 October 2010 to end Liverpool's run of six games without a win. In June 2011, it was announced that Kyrgiakos would get a 12-month contract extension at Anfield after his initial two-year contract expired.

After 49 appearances and three goals for the Reds, Kyrgiakos left the club for Bundesliga side VfL Wolfsburg on 22 August 2011.

=== VfL Wolfsburg ===
After discussions with Wolfsburg manager Felix Magath, the Greek defender was quoted as saying, "I am very happy to be joining Wolfsburg. I want to help the VfL finish the season in as high a position as is possible." Magath was hoping that Kyrgiakos made an immediate impact in German football: "Kyrgiakos is a player who will step in straight away to help. He is experienced, knows the Bundesliga and does not need time to adapt. With his commitment, we are able to strengthen defensively." It was later confirmed that he switched on a free transfer after speculation regarding a transfer fee.

==== Loan to Sunderland ====
On 31 January 2012, Kyrgiakos signed for Sunderland on a loan deal lasting until the end of the 2011–12 season.

=== Sydney Olympic ===
On 1 March 2014, Kyrgiakos signed for Australian club Sydney Olympic for a two-game contract. He was officially unveiled as a Sydney Olympic player at a press conference at the Alpha Restaurant in Sydney. Kyrgiakos stated in the press conference, "It's a beautiful thing for me to come to Sydney and play football in Australia. I wanted to experience this opportunity and this opportunity was available for a handful of games and that's really it, that was the proposal from the club. I will be thrilled to get to know Australian football and experience it and it's very significant that I'm coming to a very historic club with great Greek support." He made his debut for the club on 23 March 2014 in round two of their NSW State League match against Blacktown Spartans at Belmore Sports Ground, where they lost 3–1.

== International career ==
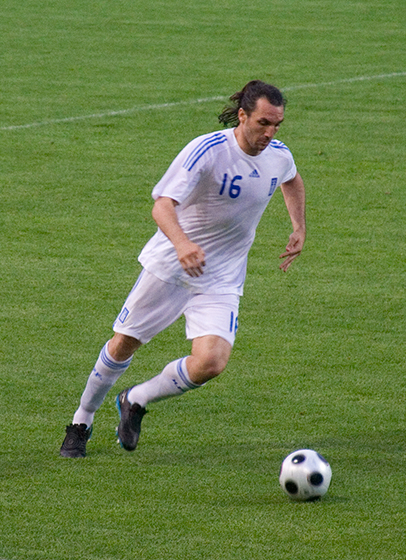
Kyrgiakos with Greece in 2008.

Kyrgiakos made his senior international debut on 13 February 2002 against Sweden, scoring his first goal against Norway one year later on 13 February 2003. Kyrgiakos was unavailable to Greece for Euro 2004 due to a knee injury, missing out on their historic triumph.

He scored three goals during Euro 2008 qualifiers and was selected in the final squad to represent Greece in the final tournament. Kyrgiakos also contributed to the qualification for the 2010 FIFA World Cup. In a surprising decision, he announced his retirement from the Greece national team on 13 August 2010. Kyrgiakos ended his international career prematurely with 61 caps and four goals for Greece because of in-fighting within the Greece national team.

== Honours ==
Panathinaikos

- Alpha Ethniki: 2003–04
- Greek Cup: 2003–04

Rangers

- Scottish Premier League: 2004–05
- Scottish League Cup: 2004–05
