= Georgios Poulopoulos =

Greek footballer

Personal information
- Full name: Georgios Poulopoulos
- Date of birth: 28 June 1975 (age 51)
- Place of birth: Greece
- Height: 1.83 m (6 ft 0 in)
- Position: Defender

Team information
- Current team: Diagoras

Senior career*
Years	Team	Apps	(Gls)
1994–1996	Kallithea	20	(0)
1996–2001	Athinaikos	60	(0)
2001–2004	Proodeftiki	51	(6)
2004–2008	Ionikos	72	(0)
2008–2012	Diagoras		
- * Club domestic league appearances and goals

Georgios Poulopoulos (Greek: Γεώργιος Πουλόπουλος; born 28 June 1975) is a Greek footballer who plays for Diagoras F.C. in the Beta Ethniki.

Poulopoulos began his playing career by signing with Kallithea F.C. in August 1994, and played two seasons for the club in the Gamma Ethniki before moving to Athinaikos F.C. in July 1996. He played for Athinaikos in the Alpha Ethniki and Beta Ethniki as the club were relegated and then promoted during his tenure. Poulopoulos has played since for Proodeftiki F.C. and Ionikos F.C. in the Alpha Ethniki.
