= Angelos Basinas =

Greek executive and retired association football player (born 1976)

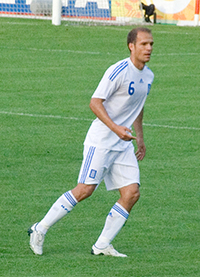
- Basinas playing for Greece in 2008

Personal information
- Date of birth: 3 January 1976 (age 50)
- Place of birth: Chalcis, Greece
- Height: 1.78 m (5 ft 10 in)
- Position: Defensive midfielder

Youth career
- –1995: Panathinaikos

Senior career*
Years	Team	Apps	(Gls)
1995–2005	Panathinaikos	199	(27)
2005–2008	Mallorca	75	(1)
2008–2009	AEK Athens	14	(0)
2009–2010	Portsmouth	15	(0)
2010–2011	Arles-Avignon	4	(0)
Total		307	(28)

International career
1999–2009	Greece	100	(7)
Medal record
Men's football
Representing Greece
UEFA European Championship
Winner	2004
World Military Cup
Winner	1997
UEFA European U-21 Championship
Runner-up	1998
- * Club domestic league appearances and goals as of May 25, 2026

Angelos Basinas (Greek: Άγγελος Μπασινάς, pronounced [ˈaɲɟeloz basiˈnas]; born 3 January 1976) is a Greek former professional footballer who played as a defensive midfielder. He could also operate as a central midfielder and a centre back.

He is best remembered for his key role in the Greece national team that won the 2004 European Championship. He provided the corner kick through which Angelos Charisteas scored the winning goal in the final against Portugal.

== Club career ==
=== Panathinaikos ===
Basinas started his career with Greek side Panathinaikos, during his time at Panathinaikos he won both the league and the Greek Football Cup in 2004. After a row broke out between Basinas, the manager and the Panathinaikos board over wages, Basinas was released on 21 September 2005, which brought an end to a career at the club which lasted over ten years, during this time he made over 150 appearances for the club scoring many crucial goals both domestically and in European competitions. ( He played 153 games (26 goals, five assists) with the club in all competitions).

=== Mallorca ===
Although rumored to go to Birmingham City, Everton, AEK Athens and Olympiacos during the 2006 winter transfer window, Basinas signed a contract with Mallorca preferring to leave Greece and join the Spanish Primera División.

In the second half of the 2005–06 season, Basinas completed a successful first period at Mallorca, helping to save the team from relegation proving a key part of the struggling team's survival. In his second year at the club he helped the team to finish in seventh position, one point from European qualification.

He was released by Mallorca on 1 July 2008 after his 2 1/2-year contract came to an end. He played 81 games (one goal, one assist) with the club in all competitions.

=== AEK Athens ===
On 31 July 2008, Basinas signed a three-year contract of €1.4 million per annum with AEK Athens, choosing the number 14. Despite the pre-season odds, AEK underachieved during the first half of the season and lost the title race too early, making Basinas favourable towards a new move during the winter transfer period.

=== Portsmouth ===
On 2 February 2009, Portsmouth confirmed the signing of Basinas on an eighteen-month contract. He made his debut for Portsmouth on 7 February 2009 against Liverpool. Just a few hours after his debut, manager Tony Adams, who brought Basinas in, was sacked by the club and replaced by Paul Hart. Under the new manager, Basinas hardly played and was benched for the rest of the season after only making three appearances for Portsmouth. Despite little playing time in his first season at Portsmouth, Basinas stated that he wanted to stay at the club. When Avram Grant became the manager of the club, Basinas had continued to impress for Portsmouth when called upon and a poll among Portsmouth fans on 23 January 2010, showed that he's appreciated by the fans. 77% of fans believe that "Basinas has the creative touch and must play", while only 2% believed he should leave the club. With Portsmouth Basinas reached the 2010 FA Cup Final against Chelsea of Carlo Ancelotti, but he was left out of the matchday squad.

=== Arles-Avignon ===
In the summer 2010, Basinas moved to Arles, with his teammate Angelos Charisteas, in the Ligue 1. He made his debut on 21 August 2010 in a 2–1 away defeat against Toulouse. Basinas made a total of five appearances in Ligue 1 and French Cup. The contract was broken two months later.

== International career ==
Basinas won his first cap in a 3–1 win over El Salvador on 18 August 1999 and scored his first goal in just his second match, also against El Salvador just two days later. He remained a part of the national team setup since his debut and was a regular after Otto Rehhagel took over in 2001.

He was a key player in Greece's upset Euro 2004 victory, scoring a penalty in his country's 2–1 upset win over host team Portugal in the tournament's opening game. Basinas was a vital player in the hard-working midfield of the Greek team throughout the tournament. In the final, Charisteas scored the winning goal for Greece against Portugal off a corner kick by Basinas, which saw Greece win the trophy.

After Theodoros Zagorakis retired, Basinas was selected to take the captain's arm band. Basinas earned his 100th cap for Greece 1 April 2009 in a FIFA World Cup 2010 qualifier against Israel. At the time, he was only the second Greek player to achieve 100 national team appearances alongside Theodoros Zagorakis.

== Personal life ==
Basinas has a brother named Stefanos who also used to play football albeit in smaller caliber teams.

== Career statistics ==
=== Club ===
Appearances and goals by club, season and competition
Club	Season	League			National Cup		League Cup		Continental		Total	
Club	Season	Division	Apps	Goals	Apps	Goals	Apps	Goals	Apps	Goals	Apps	Goals
Panathinaikos	1995–96	Alpha Ethniki	1	0	1	0	–		0	0	2	0
Panathinaikos	1996–97	Alpha Ethniki	1	0	4	0	–		0	0	5	0
Panathinaikos	1997–98	Alpha Ethniki	26	1	8	1	–		–		34	2
Panathinaikos	1998–99	Alpha Ethniki	21	0	4	0	–		6	0	31	0
Panathinaikos	1999–2000	Alpha Ethniki	29	4	4	0	–		6	0	39	4
Panathinaikos	2000–01	Alpha Ethniki	25	3	9	3	–		14	2	48	8
Panathinaikos	2001–02	Alpha Ethniki	22	4	6	1	–		14	3	42	8
Panathinaikos	2002–03	Alpha Ethniki	24	5	6	0	–		9	2	39	7
Panathinaikos	2003–04	Alpha Ethniki	26	7	7	2	–		6	1	39	10
Panathinaikos	2004–05	Alpha Ethniki	24	3	2	0	–		8	0	34	3
Panathinaikos	Total		199	27	51	7	0	0	63	8	313	42
Mallorca	2005–06	La Liga	14	0	0	0	–		–		14	0
Mallorca	2006–07	La Liga	29	0	3	0	–		–		32	0
Mallorca	2007–08	La Liga	32	1	6	0	–		–		38	1
Mallorca	Total		75	1	9	0	0	0	0	0	84	1
AEK Athens	2008–09	Super League Greece	14	0	2	0	–		1	0	17	0
Portsmouth	2008–09	Premier League	3	0	0	0	0	0	–		3	0
Portsmouth	2009–10	Premier League	12	0	3	0	2	0	–		17	0
Portsmouth	Total		15	0	3	0	2	0	0	0	20	0
Arles-Avignon	2010–11	Ligue 1	4	0	0	0	1	0	–		4	0
Career total			307	28	65	7	3	0	64	8	439	43

=== International ===
Appearances and goals by national team and year
National team	Year	Apps	Goals
Greece	1999	6	1
Greece	2000	9	0
Greece	2001	7	1
Greece	2002	9	0
Greece	2003	7	0
Greece	2004	15	1
Greece	2005	13	1
Greece	2006	8	0
Greece	2007	10	3
Greece	2008	13	0
Greece	2009	3	0
Total		100	7

Scores and results list Greece's goal tally first, score column indicates score after each Basinas goal.

List of international goals scored by Angelos Basinas
No.	Date	Venue	Opponent	Score	Result	Competition
1	20 August 1999	Kavala National Stadium, Kavala, Greece	El Salvador	1–0	3–0	Friendly
2	28 February 2001	Theodoros Vardinogiannis Stadium, Heraklion, Greece	Russia	3–3	3–3	Friendly
3	12 June 2004	Estádio do Dragão, Porto, Portugal	Portugal	2–0	2–1	UEFA Euro 2004
4	9 February 2005	Georgios Karaiskakis Stadium, Piraeus, Greece	Denmark	2–0	2–1	2006 FIFA World Cup qualifier
5	28 March 2007	Ta' Qali National Stadium, Ta' Qali, Malta	Malta	1–0	1–0	UEFA Euro 2008 qualifier
6	17 November 2007	Spyros Louis Olympic Stadium, Athens, Greece	Malta	2–0	5–0	UEFA Euro 2008 qualifier
7	21 November 2007	Ferenc Puskás Stadium, Budapest, Hungary	Hungary	2–1	2–1	UEFA Euro 2008 qualifier

== Honours ==
=== Panathinaikos ===
- Alpha Ethniki: 1995–96, 2003–04
- Greek Cup: 2003–04; runner-up 1997–98, 1998–99

=== Portsmouth ===
- FA Cup: runner-up 2010

=== Greece U21 ===
- UEFA European Under-21 Championship runner-up: 1998

=== Greece ===
- European Championship: 2004

== See also ==
- List of men's footballers with 100 or more international caps
