= Kyros Vassaras =

Greek football referee

- Born: 1 February 1966 (age 60); Thessaloniki
- Other occupation: Head of the Referee Committee for the Romanian Football Federation

Domestic
| Years | League | Role |
| 1995–2009 | Super League Greece | Referee |

International
| Years | League | Role |
| 1998–2009 | FIFA listed | Referee |

The cover of Vassaras’s autobiographical book, “My Way”

Kyros Vassaras (Greek: Κύρος Βασσάρας; Thessaloniki, 1 February 1966) is a Greek retired professional football referee.

He served as an UEFA Elite Referee and in his career, he officiated more than 28 Champions League games.

In 2016, he was honored by FIFA with the "FIFA Special Award" for his yearlong contributions to football refereeing.

== Referreeing career ==
He began refereeing at a very young age, encouraged by his father, Antonis Vassaras (1939–2007), who was a Greek international referee. He started officiating in 1984, at the age of 18 in amateur leagues and gradually worked his way up. Eleven years later, in 1995, he became a referee in the Greek first division., Greece’s top-flight football division.

In 1998, he was awarded his FIFA badge, and he officiated his first senior international game in 1999, in a match between Austria and San Marino. In 1999, he was selected as one of the referees for the FIFA World U-17 Championships in New Zealand. He was named as an elite referee of UEFA in 2004.

In the period 2004-2009 he officiated matches in the UEFA Champions League, the European Championships and the Olympic Games.

In 2009, Vassaras was unexpectedly retired from professional refereeing due to a back injury he suffered in an rare accident at the Athens airport while returning home.

After retiring, he was hired as the head of the Referee Committee by the Romanian Football Federation.

In 2023, he published in Greek his autobiographical book, titled as, "My way".

== Controversial ==
By the Greek media, due to his refereeing style, Vassaras has been characterized and called as “incorruptible and stubborn”.

He was also frequently the subject of reports in the Greek media, with articles appearing over the years that portrayed him in both a positive and a negative light. In all of his career, he frequently came into conflict with the Hellenic Football Federation, as well as with football executives associated with the “big” Greek clubs (namely, Olympiakos, AEK, Panathinaikos).

== Personal life ==
Apart from refereeing, Vassaras's main profession is a travelling agent. Vassaras is a polyglot -a fact that helped his international refereeing career- being able to speak, besides modern Greek, German, English and Spanish.

Sporting positions (Greece) Kyros Vassaras
| Preceded by (Mexico) Felipe Ramos Rizo | 2004 Men's Olympic Football Tournament Final Referee | Succeeded by (Hungary) Viktor Kassai |
