= Yiannis Pathiakakis Stadium =

Multi-purpose stadium in Ano Losia, Greece

Coordinates: 38.084535°N 23.688256°E

Yiannis Pathiakakis Stadium is a multi-purpose stadium in Ano Liosia, Greece. It is currently used mostly for football matches and is the home stadium of Akratitos. The stadium holds 5,000 and was built in 1965. It is named after Giannis Pathiakakis, who guided Akratitos from the lower ranks to the top flight but died in 2002 on the pitch during a training session.
