= 2006–07 Panathinaikos F.C. season =

Panathinaikos
2006–07 season
- Chairman: Argiris Mitsou
- Manager: Hans Backe
- Ground: Olympic Stadium
- Super League: 3rd
- Greek Cup: Runners Up
- UEFA Cup: Round of 32
- Top goalscorer: League: Dimitris Salpingidis (14); All: Dimitris Salpingidis (17)
- Highest home attendance: 40,914 vs RC Lens; 22 February 2007
- Lowest home attendance: 1,604 vs Kerkyra; 13 May 2007
- Average home league attendance: 14,716
| Home colours | Away colours | Third colours |

In the 2006–07 season Panathinaikos played for 48th consecutive time in Greece's top division, Super League. The club also participated in the Greek Cup and UEFA Cup. The season started with Hans Backe as team manager.

== Players ==
=== First-team squad ===
Squad at end of season

Note: Flags indicate national team as defined under FIFA eligibility rules; some limited exceptions apply. Players may hold more than one non-FIFA nationality.

| No. | Pos. | Nation | Player |
|---|---|---|---|
| 1 | GK | CRO | Mario Galinović |
| 3 | DF | SWE | Mikael Antonsson |
| 4 | DF | GRE | Ilias Kotsios |
| 5 | DF | RSA | Nasief Morris |
| 6 | MF | BRA | Ricardo Bovio |
| 7 | FW | GRE | Fanis Gekas |
| 8 | DF | GRE | Giannis Goumas (captain) |
| 9 | FW | ARG | Sebastián Romero |
| 10 | MF | ARG | Ezequiel González |
| 11 | FW | GRE | Dimitrios Papadopoulos (vice-captain) |
| 12 | GK | CMR | Pierre Ebede |
| 14 | FW | GRE | Dimitris Salpingidis |
| 15 | MF | CRO | Srđan Andrić |
| 16 | GK | GRE | Alexandros Tzorvas |
| 17 | FW | GRE | Athanasios Tsigas |

| No. | Pos. | Nation | Player |
|---|---|---|---|
| 18 | MF | GER | Giorgos Theodoridis |
| 19 | DF | AUS | Anthony Seric |
| 20 | MF | GRE | Sotiris Leontiou |
| 21 | MF | CYP | Constantinos Charalambidis |
| 22 | MF | GRE | Alexandros Tziolis |
| 23 | MF | ESP | Víctor Sánchez |
| 24 | DF | GRE | Loukas Vyntra |
| 25 | DF | CRO | Igor Bišćan |
| 26 | FW | GRE | Vaggelis Mantzios |
| 27 | MF | AUT | Andreas Ivanschitz |
| 29 | DF | SWE | Mikael Nilsson |
| 31 | DF | GRE | Filippos Darlas |
| 32 | MF | ROU | Lucian Sanmartean |
| 37 | MF | GRE | Sotiris Ninis |

== Transfers ==
In: Note: Flags indicate national team as defined under FIFA eligibility rules; some limited exceptions apply. Players may hold more than one non-FIFA nationality.

| No. | Pos. | Nation | Player |
|---|---|---|---|
| 3 | DF | SWE | Mikael Antonsson (From Austria Wien) |
| 6 | DF | BRA | Ricardo Bóvio (Loan from (Spain) Málaga) |
| 9 | MF | ARG | Sebastián Romero (From (Argentina) Racing Club) |
| 14 | FW | GRE | Dimitris Salpingidis (From (Greece) PAOK) |
| 23 | MF | ESP | Víctor Sánchez (From (Spain) Deportivo La Coruña) |
| 22 | FW | GRE | Athanasios Tsigas (From (Greece) Kallithea) |
| 27 | MF | AUT | Andreas Ivanschitz (From (Austria) Red Bull Salzburg) |

Out: Note: Flags indicate national team as defined under FIFA eligibility rules; some limited exceptions apply. Players may hold more than one non-FIFA nationality.

| No. | Pos. | Nation | Player |

== Team kit ==
| Home | Away | Third |

== Competitions ==
=== Super League Greece ===
==== League table ====
| Pos | Team | Pld | W | D | L | GF | GA | GD | Pts | Qualification or relegation |
|---|---|---|---|---|---|---|---|---|---|---|
| 1 | Olympiacos (C) | 30 | 22 | 5 | 3 | 62 | 23 | +39 | 71 | Qualification for the Champions League group stage |
| 2 | AEK Athens | 30 | 18 | 8 | 4 | 60 | 27 | +33 | 62 | Qualification for the Champions League third qualifying round |
| 3 | Panathinaikos | 30 | 16 | 6 | 8 | 47 | 28 | +19 | 54 | Qualification for the UEFA Cup first round |
| 4 | Aris | 30 | 11 | 13 | 6 | 32 | 26 | +6 | 46 | Qualification for the UEFA Cup first round |
| 5 | Panionios | 30 | 12 | 9 | 9 | 33 | 31 | +2 | 45 (Note: Head-to-head record: PAOK–Panionios 1–1, Panionios–PAOK 3–1.) | Qualification for the UEFA Cup first round |

Source: Super League Greece
Rules for classification: 1st points; 2nd head-to-head points; 3rd head-to-head goal difference; 4th decision match.
(C) Champions

==== Matches ====
| 19 August 2006 1 | Egaleo | 1–4 | Panathinaikos | Athens |
| 19:00 | Petropoulos 71' | | Salpingidis 38', 41', 77'; Papadopoulos 82' | Stadium: Stavros Mavrothalassitis Stadium; Attendance: 3,077; Referee: Giannis Tsachilidis |

| 25 August 2006 2 | Panathinaikos | 0–2 | Ionikos | Athens |
| 21:00 | | | Xenidis 29'; Onwuachi 70' | Stadium: Olympic Stadium; Attendance: 25,552; Referee: Vasileios Terovitsas |

| 8 September 2006 3 | Panathinaikos | 1–0 | Skoda Xanthi | Athens |
| 21:00 | Papadopoulos 82' (pen.) | | | Stadium: Olympic Stadium; Attendance: 16,500; Referee: Kyros Vassaras |

| 16 September 2006 4 | Panionios | 0–1 | Panathinaikos | Athens |
| 21:00 | | | Papadopoulos 87' | Stadium: Nea Smyrni Stadium; Attendance: 2,484; Referee: Konstantinos Finokaliotis |

| 23 September 2006 5 | Panathinaikos | 2–1 | PAOK | Athens |
| 21:00 | Ivanschitz 66'; Salpingidis 89' (pen.) | | Zegarra 90+1' | Stadium: Olympic Stadium; Attendance: 21,356; Referee: Vasileios Terovitsas |

| 30 September 2006 6 | OFI | 3–3 | Panathinaikos | Heraklion |
| 19:00 | Drulić 22' (pen.); Ofori-Quaye 23'; Pitsos 58' | | Ivanschitz 64', 68'; Salpingidis 81' | Stadium: Theodoros Vardinogiannis Stadium; Attendance: 5,026; Referee: Giannis Tsachilidis |

| 22 October 2006 7 | Panathinaikos | 1–2 | AEK Athens | Athens |
| 19:00 | Papadopoulos 25' | | Manduca 28' (pen.); Dellas 76' | Stadium: Olympic Stadium; Attendance: 33,199; Referee: Georgios Kasnaferis |

| 28 October 2006 8 | Iraklis | 0–1 | Panathinaikos | Thessaloniki |
| 21:00 | | | Salpingidis 55' | Stadium: Kaftanzoglio Stadium; Attendance: 4,675; Referee: Athanassios Briakos |

| 4 November 2006 9 | Panathinaikos | 1–0 | Olympiacos | Athens |
| 19:00 | Romero 48'; Sánchez (yellow card) 76' (yellow-red card) 90+4' | | | Stadium: Olympic Stadium; Attendance: 40,091; Referee: Vasileios Terovitsas |

| 11 November 2006 10 | Ergotelis | 0–1 | Panathinaikos | Heraklion |
| 17:00 | | | Bóvio 76' | Stadium: Pankritio Stadium; Attendance: 8,450; Referee: Dimitrios Kalopoulos |

| 18 November 2006 11 | Atromitos | 0–4 | Panathinaikos | Peristeri |
| 19:00 | | | Tziolis 8', 71'; Salpingidis 77'; Mantzios 82' | Stadium: Peristeri Stadium; Attendance: 6,873; Referee: Vasileios Paboridis |

| 25 November 2006 12 | Panathinaikos | 3–2 | Apollon Kalamarias | Athens |
| 19:00 | Salpingidis 41'; Papadopoulos 43', 81' | | Bushi 3'; Karaliopoulos 89' | Stadium: Olympic Stadium; Attendance: 13,914; Referee: Konstantinos Zanetidis |

| 2 December 2006 13 | Aris | 1–0 | Panathinaikos | Thessaloniki |
| 19:00 | Weisheimer 54' | | | Stadium: Kleanthis Vikelidis Stadium; Attendance: 10,433; Referee: Vasileios Terovitsas |

| 8 December 2006 14 | Panathinaikos | 1–0 | AEL | Athens |
| 19:00 | Salpingidis 88' | | | Stadium: Olympic Stadium; Attendance: 9,358; Referee: Georgios Daloukas |

| 16 December 2006 15 | Kerkyra | 3–1 | Panathinaikos | Kerkyra |
| 16:45 | Guela 46'; Zacharopoulos 63' (pen.); Da Silva 90+4'; Da Silva (yellow card) 39' (yellow-red card) 90+5' | | Papadopoulos 27' (pen.); Vyntra (red card) 71' | Stadium: Kerkyra Stadium; Attendance: 2,500; Referee: Kyros Vassaras |

| 6 January 2007 16 | Panathinaikos | 1–0 | Egaleo | Athens |
| 19:00 | Mantzios 81' | | | Stadium: Olympic Stadium; Attendance: 7,847; Referee: Georgios Zolotas |

| 13 January 2007 17 | Ionikos | 0–4 | Panathinaikos | Piraeus |
| 19:00 | | | Tsigas 13', 49'; Poulopoulos 65' (o.g.); Romero 83' | Stadium: Neapoli Stadium; Attendance: 1,907; Referee: Charalampos Karatzas |

| 20 January 2007 18 | Skoda Xanthi | 0–0 | Panathinaikos | Xanthi |
| 16:45 | | | | Stadium: Skoda Xanthi Arena; Attendance: 6,642; Referee: Athanassios Briakos |

| 27 January 2007 19 | Panathinaikos | 2–0 | Panionios | Athens |
| 16:45 | Salpingidis 6'; Ninis 46' | | | Stadium: Olympic Stadium; Attendance: 13,527; Referee: Dimitrios Kalopoulos |

| 3 February 2007 20 | PAOK | 2–1 | Panathinaikos | Thessaloniki |
| 19:00 | Georgiadis 18'; Balafas 55' | | Papadopoulos 35' (pen.) | Stadium: Toumba Stadium; Attendance: 8,795; Referee: Giannis Tsachilidis |

| 11 February 2007 21 | Panathinaikos | 2–2 | OFI | Athens |
| 19:00 | Salpingidis 3' (pen.), 13' (pen.) | | Nwafor 4'; Drulić 14' | Stadium: Olympic Stadium; Attendance: 4,470; Referee: Vasileios Arguropoulos |

| 18 February 2007 22 | AEK Athens | 1–4 | Panathinaikos | Athens |
| 19:00 | Kapetanos 89' | | Goumas 3'; Ninis 8'; Salpingidis 14'; Ivanschitz 66' | Stadium: Olympic Stadium; Attendance: 19,810; Referee: Vasileios Terovitsas |

| 25 February 2007 23 | Panathinaikos | 3–0 | Iraklis | Athens |
| 19:00 | Papadopoulos 11'; Mantzios 43'; Romero 66' | | | Stadium: Olympic Stadium; Attendance: 7,380; Referee: Romanos Kontogiannidis |

| 4 March 2007 24 | Olympiacos | 0–1 | Panathinaikos | Piraeus |
| 19:00 | | | Papadopoulos 89' | Stadium: Karaiskakis Stadium; Attendance: 30,958; Referee: Georgios Kasnaferis |

| 11 March 2007 25 | Panathinaikos | 0–1 | Ergotelis | Athens |
| 19:00 | | | Načevski 19'; Ognjenović (yellow card) 38' (yellow-red card) 44' | Stadium: Olympic Stadium; Attendance: 9,256; Referee: Charalampos Karatzas |

| 18 March 2007 26 | Panathinaikos | 1–2 | Atromitos | Athens |
| 19:00 | Papadopoulos 70' | | Koutsospyros 32'; Oliveira 65' | Stadium: Olympic Stadium; Attendance: 5,992; Referee: Kyros Vassaras |

| 15 April 2007 27 | Apollon Kalamarias | 1–1 | Panathinaikos | Thessaloniki |
| 19:00 | Perrone (yellow card) 62' (yellow-red card) 88'; Bushi 90+3' | | Papadopoulos (yellow card) 18' (red card) 56'; Salpingidis 58' | Stadium: Kalamaria Stadium; Attendance: 1,554; Referee: Athanassios Briakos |

| 22 April 2007 28 | Panathinaikos | 0–1 | Aris | Athens |
| 19:00 | | | Nascimento 89' | Stadium: Olympic Stadium; Attendance: 5,286; Referee: Iraklis Tsikinis |

| 29 April 2007 29 | AEL | 1–1 | Panathinaikos | Larissa |
| 19:00 | Gavrilopoulos 81' | | Papadopoulos 70' | Stadium: Alcazar Stadium; Attendance: 5,774; Referee: Charalampos Karatzas |

| 13 May 2007 30 | Panathinaikos | 2–2 | Kerkyra | Athens |
| 19:00 | Ninis 66'; Gustavo 84' (o.g.) | | Guela 13' (pen.); Skoufalis 79'; Carvalho (red card) 89' | Stadium: Olympic Stadium; Attendance: 1,604; Referee: Konstantinos Papastamatis |

=== Greek Cup ===
==== Fourth round ====
| 8 November 2006 | Thrasyvoulos | 0–1 | Panathinaikos | Fyli |
| 16:00 EET | | Report | Morris 43' | Stadium: Fyli Municipal Stadium; Referee: Christoforos Zografos (Athens) |

==== Fifth round ====
| 19 December 2006 Original match | Panathinaikos | 0–0 | Apollon Kalamarias | Athens |
| 17:45 EET | | Report | | Stadium: Athens Olympic Stadium; Referee: Ilias Mazarakos (Arta) |

| 9 January 2007 Replay | Apollon Kalamarias | 1–1 (a.e.t.) (2–3 p) | Panathinaikos | Thessaloniki |
| 17:45 EET | Bushi 14' | Report | Papadopoulos 65' | Stadium: Kalamaria Stadium; Referee: Romanos Kontogiannidis (Xanthi) |
| | Penalties |
| | Favalli (penalty missed); Orfanos (penalty scored); Fytanidis (penalty missed); Galanopoulos (penalty scored); El Halwani (penalty missed) | | (penalty missed) Sánchez; (penalty missed) Papadopoulos; (penalty scored) Morris; (penalty scored) Bóvio; (penalty scored) Salpingidis |

==== Quarter-finals ====
| 17 January 2007 First leg | PAOK | 2–1 | Panathinaikos | Thessaloniki |
| 19:00 EET | Konstantinidis 31'; Mięciel 42' | Report | Mantzios 62' | Stadium: Toumba Stadium; Attendance: 13,924; Referee: Anastasios Kakos (Corfu) |

| 31 January 2007 Second leg | Panathinaikos | 3–1 (a.e.t.) (4–3 agg.) | PAOK | Athens |
| 21:45 EET | Ivanschitz 40'; Mantzios 63', 95' | Report | Georgiadis 90' | Stadium: Athens Olympic Stadium; Attendance: 23,747; Referee: Giorgos Kasnaferis (Athens) |

==== Semi-finals ====
| 28 February 2007 First leg | Panathinaikos | 0–0 | Skoda Xanthi | Athens |
| 19:00 EET | | Report | | Stadium: Athens Olympic Stadium; Attendance: 7,511; Referee: Dimitris Kalopoulos (Thessaloniki) |

| 18 April 2007 Second leg | Skoda Xanthi | 0–1 (0–1 agg.) | Panathinaikos | Xanthi |
| 16:00 | | Report | Tziolis 5' | Stadium: Skoda Xanthi Arena; Attendance: 5,615; Referee: Kyros Vassaras (Thessaloniki) |

==== Final ====
| 5 May 2007 | Panathinaikos | 1–2 | AEL | Volos |
| 18:00 EEST | Papadopoulos 44' (pen.) | Report | Kožlej 3'; Antchouet 82' | Stadium: Panthessaliko Stadium; Attendance: 18,111; Referee: Kyros Vassaras (Thessaloniki) |

=== UEFA Cup ===
==== First round ====
| 14 September 2006 First leg | Panathinaikos (Greece) | 1–1 | (Ukraine) Metalurh Zaporizhya | Patras, Greece |
| 20:45 | Salpingidis 10' | Report | Godin 47'; Karamushka (yellow card) 50' (yellow-red card) 50' | Stadium: Pampeloponnisiako Stadium; Attendance: 15,626; Referee: Paulo Manuel Gomes Costa (Portugal) |

| 28 September 2006 Second leg | Metalurh Zaporizhya (Ukraine) | 0–1 (1–2 agg.) | (Greece) Panathinaikos | Zaporizhia, Ukraine |
| 19:00 | | Report | Papadopoulos 14' | Stadium: Slavutych-Arena; Attendance: 11,800; Referee: Krzysztof Slupik (Poland) |

==== Group G ====
| Pos | Team | Pld | W | D | L | GF | GA | GD | Pts | Qualification | PAN | PSG | HTA | RAP | MLA |
|---|---|---|---|---|---|---|---|---|---|---|---|---|---|---|---|
| 1 | (Greece) Panathinaikos | 4 | 2 | 1 | 1 | 3 | 4 | −1 | 7 | Advance to knockout stage | — | — | 2–0 | 0–0 | — |
| 2 | (France) Paris Saint-Germain | 4 | 1 | 2 | 1 | 6 | 4 | +2 | 5 | Advance to knockout stage | 4–0 | — | 2–4 | — | — |
| 3 | (Israel) Hapoel Tel Aviv | 4 | 1 | 2 | 1 | 7 | 7 | 0 | 5 | Advance to knockout stage | — | — | — | 2–2 | 1–1 |
| 4 | (Romania) Rapid București | 4 | 0 | 4 | 0 | 3 | 3 | 0 | 4 | | — | 0–0 | — | — | 1–1 |
| 5 | (Czech Republic) Mladá Boleslav | 4 | 0 | 3 | 1 | 2 | 3 | −1 | 3 | | 0–1 | 0–0 | — | — | — |

| 19 October 2006 1 | Panathinaikos (Greece) | 2–0 | (Israel) Hapoel Tel Aviv | Athens, Greece |
| 18:00 CET | Chen 47' (o.g.); Romero 64' | Report | | Stadium: Olympic Stadium; Attendance: Behind closed doors Referee: Eduardo Iturralde González (Spain) |

| 2 November 2006 2 | Mladá Boleslav (Czech Republic) | 0–1 | (Greece) Panathinaikos | Mladá Boleslav, Czech Republic |
| 20:15 CET | | Report | Salpingidis 64' | Stadium: Městský stadion Attendance: 4,280; Referee: Alan Kelly (Ireland) |

| 30 November 2006 3 | Panathinaikos (Greece) | 1–0 | (Romania) Rapid București | Athens, Greece |
| 20:45 CET | | Report | Constantin (yellow card) 75' (red card) 84' | Stadium: Olympic Stadium; Attendance: 18,043; Referee: Matteo Trefoloni (Italy) |

| 13 December 2006 4 | Paris Saint-Germain (France) | 4–0 | (Greece) Panathinaikos | Paris, France |
| 20:45 CET | Pauleta 29', 47'; Kalou 52', 54' | Report | | Stadium: Parc des Princes; Attendance: 25,160; Referee: Carlos Megía Dávila (Spain) |

==== Knockout stage ====
===== Round of 32 =====
| 15 February 2007 First leg | Lens (France) | 3–1 | (Greece) Panathinaikos | Lens, France |
| 20:45 CET | Jemâa 50', 70'; Dindane 90' (pen.) | Report | Salpingidis 65' | Stadium: Stade Félix-Bollaert; Referee: Jonas Eriksson (Sweden) |

| 22 February 2007 Second leg | Panathinaikos (Greece) | 0–0 (1-3 agg.) | (France) Lens | Athens, Greece |
| 20:45 CET | Morris (red card) 80' | Report | | Stadium: Olympic Stadium; Referee: Jaroslav Jára (Czech Republic) |

== Squad statistics ==
=== Appearances and goals ===
| No. | Pos | Nat | Player | Total | | Super League | | Greek Cup | | UEFA Cup | |
| No. | Pos | Nat | Player | Apps | Goals | Apps | Goals | Apps | Goals | Apps | Goals |
|---|---|---|---|---|---|---|---|---|---|---|---|
| 1 | GK | (Croatia) CRO | Mario Galinović | 10 | 0 | 8+0 | 0 | 0+0 | 0 | 2+0 | 0 |
| 3 | DF | (Sweden) SWE | Mikael Antonsson | 8 | 0 | 6+1 | 0 | 0+0 | 0 | 1+0 | 0 |
| 4 | DF | (Greece) GRE | Ilias Kotsios | 5 | 0 | 2+2 | 0 | 0+0 | 0 | 0+1 | 0 |
| 5 | DF | (South Africa) RSA | Nasief Morris | 36 | 0 | 27+1 | 0 | 0+0 | 0 | 8+0 | 0 |
| 6 | MF | (Brazil) BRA | Ricardo Bovio | 28 | 1 | 20+4 | 1 | 0+0 | 0 | 3+1 | 0 |
| 8 | DF | (Greece) GRE | Giannis Goumas | 29 | 1 | 25+0 | 1 | 0+0 | 0 | 4+0 | 0 |
| 9 | MF | (Argentina) ARG | Sebastian Romero | 31 | 4 | 17+7 | 3 | 0+0 | 0 | 5+2 | 1 |
| 10 | MF | (Argentina) ARG | Ezequiel González | 3 | 0 | 0+2 | 0 | 0+0 | 0 | 0+1 | 0 |
| 11 | FW | (Greece) GRE | Dimitrios Papadopoulos | 34 | 13 | 24+3 | 12 | 0+0 | 0 | 6+1 | 1 |
| 12 | GK | (Cameroon) CMR | Pierre Ebede | 29 | 0 | 22+0 | 0 | 0+0 | 0 | 6+1 | 0 |
| 14 | FW | (Greece) GRE | Dimitris Salpingidis | 35 | 17 | 26+1 | 14 | 0+0 | 0 | 7+1 | 3 |
| 15 | DF | (Croatia) CRO | Srdjan Andrić | 4 | 0 | 0+1 | 0 | 0+0 | 0 | 1+2 | 0 |
| 16 | GK | (Greece) GRE | Alexandros Tzorvas | 1 | 0 | 0+1 | 0 | 0+0 | 0 | 0+0 | 0 |
| 17 | FW | (Greece) GRE | Athanasios Tsigas | 2 | 2 | 1+1 | 2 | 0+0 | 0 | 0+0 | 0 |
| 18 | MF | (Greece) GRE | Giorgos Theodoridis | 9 | 0 | 1+6 | 0 | 0+0 | 0 | 1+1 | 0 |
| 19 | DF | (Croatia) CRO | Anthony Šerić | 20 | 0 | 16+1 | 0 | 0+0 | 0 | 3+0 | 0 |
| 20 | MF | (Greece) GRE | Sotiris Leontiou | 27 | 0 | 13+8 | 0 | 0+0 | 0 | 4+2 | 0 |
| 21 | MF | (Cyprus) CYP | Constantinos Charalambidis | 1 | 0 | 0+1 | 0 | 0+0 | 0 | 0+0 | 0 |
| 22 | MF | (Greece) GRE | Alexandros Tziolis | 31 | 2 | 20+4 | 2 | 0+0 | 0 | 7+0 | 0 |
| 23 | MF | (Spain) ESP | Víctor Sánchez | 15 | 0 | 10+2 | 0 | 0+0 | 0 | 1+2 | 0 |
| 24 | DF | (Greece) GRE | Loukas Vyntra | 34 | 0 | 24+2 | 0 | 0+0 | 0 | 8+0 | 0 |
| 25 | MF | (Croatia) CRO | Igor Bišćan | 20 | 0 | 9+6 | 0 | 0+0 | 0 | 3+2 | 0 |
| 26 | FW | (Greece) GRE | Vangelis Mantzios | 29 | 3 | 10+13 | 3 | 0+0 | 0 | 2+4 | 0 |
| 27 | MF | (Austria) AUT | Andreas Ivanschitz | 33 | 4 | 19+7 | 4 | 0+0 | 0 | 7+0 | 0 |
| 29 | DF | (Sweden) SWE | Mikael Nilsson | 27 | 0 | 14+7 | 0 | 0+0 | 0 | 5+1 | 0 |
| 31 | DF | (Greece) GRE | Filippos Darlas | 8 | 0 | 3+1 | 0 | 0+0 | 0 | 3+1 | 0 |
| 37 | MF | (Greece) GRE | Sotiris Ninis | 16 | 3 | 12+2 | 3 | 0+0 | 0 | 1+1 | 0 |
| 38 | DF | (Greece) GRE | Nikolaos Boutzikos | 0 | 0 | 0+0 | 0 | 0+0 | 0 | 0+0 | 0 |
Players who appeared for Panathinaikos but left during the season:

=== Top scorers ===
| Place | Position | Nation | Number | Name | Super League | Greek Cup | UEFA Cup | Total |
|---|---|---|---|---|---|---|---|---|
| 1 | FW | (Greece) | 14 | Dimitris Salpingidis | 14 | 0 | 3 | 17 |
| 2 | FW | (Greece) | 11 | Dimitrios Papadopoulos | 12 | 0 | 1 | 13 |
| 3 | MF | (Austria) | 27 | Andreas Ivanschitz | 4 | 0 | 0 | 4 |
| 3 | MF | (Argentina) | 9 | Sebastián Ariel Romero | 3 | 0 | 1 | 4 |
| 5 | FW | (Greece) | 26 | Vangelis Mantzios | 3 | 0 | 0 | 3 |
| 5 | MF | (Greece) | 37 | Sotiris Ninis | 3 | 0 | 0 | 3 |
| 5 | | | | Own goal | 2 | 0 | 1 | 3 |
| 8 | MF | (Greece) | 22 | Alexandros Tziolis | 2 | 0 | 0 | 2 |
| 8 | FW | (Greece) | | Athanasios Tsigas | 2 | 0 | 0 | 2 |
| 10 | DF | (Brazil) | 6 | Ricardo Bóvio | 1 | 0 | 0 | 1 |
| 10 | DF | (Greece) | 8 | Giannis Goumas | 1 | 0 | 0 | 1 |
| | | | | TOTALS | 47 | 8 | 6 | 61 |

=== Disciplinary record ===
| Number | Nation | Position | Name | Super League | | Greek Cup | | UEFA Cup | | Total | |
| Number | Nation | Position | Name | Booked | Sent off (straight red) | Booked | Sent off (straight red) | Booked | Sent off (straight red) | Booked | Sent off (straight red) |
| 5 | (South Africa) | DF | Nasief Morris | 2 | 0 | 0 | 0 | 1 | 1 | 3 | 1 |
| 6 | (Brazil) | MF | Ricardo Bovio | 7 | 0 | 0 | 0 | 2 | 0 | 9 | 0 |
| 8 | (Greece) | DF | Giannis Goumas | 6 | 0 | 0 | 0 | 1 | 0 | 7 | 0 |
| 9 | (Argentina) | MF | Sebastian Romero | 8 | 0 | 0 | 0 | 1 | 0 | 9 | 0 |
| 10 | (Argentina) | MF | Ezequiel González | 1 | 0 | 0 | 0 | 1 | 0 | 2 | 0 |
| 11 | (Greece) | FW | Dimitrios Papadopoulos | 5 | 1 | 0 | 0 | 0 | 0 | 5 | 1 |
| 12 | (Cameroon) | GK | Pierre Ebede | 3 | 0 | 0 | 0 | 1 | 0 | 4 | 0 |
| 14 | (Greece) | FW | Dimitris Salpingidis | 3 | 0 | 0 | 0 | 0 | 0 | 3 | 0 |
| 15 | (Croatia) | DF | Srdjan Andrić | 0 | 0 | 0 | 0 | 1 | 0 | 1 | 0 |
| 17 | (Greece) | MF | Giorgos Theodoridis | 1 | 0 | 0 | 0 | 0 | 0 | 1 | 0 |
| 19 | (Croatia) | DF | Anthony Šerić | 7 | 0 | 0 | 0 | 0 | 0 | 7 | 0 |
| 20 | (Greece) | MF | Sotiris Leontiou | 2 | 0 | 0 | 0 | 0 | 0 | 2 | 0 |
| 22 | (Greece) | MF | Alexandros Tziolis | 2 | 0 | 0 | 0 | 0 | 0 | 2 | 0 |
| 23 | (Spain) | MF | Víctor Sánchez | 6 | 1 | 0 | 0 | 1 | 0 | 7 | 1 |
| 24 | (Greece) | DF | Loukas Vyntra | 5 | 1 | 0 | 0 | 2 | 0 | 7 | 1 |
| 25 | (Croatia) | MF | Igor Bišćan | 5 | 0 | 0 | 0 | 1 | 0 | 6 | 0 |
| 26 | (Greece) | FW | Vangelis Mantzios | 2 | 0 | 0 | 0 | 2 | 0 | 4 | 0 |
| 27 | (Austria) | MF | Andreas Ivanschitz | 7 | 0 | 0 | 0 | 1 | 0 | 8 | 0 |
| 31 | (Greece) | DF | Filippos Darlas | 2 | 0 | 0 | 0 | 1 | 0 | 3 | 0 |
| | | | TOTALS | 75 | 3 | 0 | 0 | 16 | 1 | 91 | 4 |
