= 2007–08 Panathinaikos F.C. season =

Panathinaikos
2007–08 season
- Chairman: Argiris Mitsou
- Manager: José Peseiro
- Ground: Leoforos Alexandras Stadium
- Super League Greece: 2nd
- Greek Cup: Fifth round
- UEFA Cup: Round of 32
- Top goalscorer: League: Dimitris Salpingidis (15); All: Dimitris Salpingidis (19)
- Highest home attendance: 15,420 vs Aris (11 May 2008)
- Lowest home attendance: 4,003 vs Panionios (7 May 2008)
- Average home league attendance: 9,180
Home colours	Away colours	Third colours

In the 2007–08 season Panathinaikos played for 49th consecutive time in Greece's top division, Super League. They also competed in UEFA Cup and Greek Cup. Season started with José Peseiro as team manager. In summer of 2007 many players left the club including Igor Bišćan and Víctor Sánchez who hadn't fulfilled the expectations of Panathinaikos' fans with their performance. On the other end the return of Giorgos Karagounis after four years pulled the spotlight and considered one of the most important signings of the 2007 summer transfer window. Panathinaikos also signed Brazilian midfielder Marcelo Mattos from Corinthians, Dame N'Doye from Academica, Josu Sarriegi from Athletic Bilbao and some other players to help the team win its first championship in four years and celebrate the club's centesimal anniversary in the most appropriate way.

The championship began with Panathinaikos collecting seven points in the first three matchdays, having already played two derbies against Olympiacos (0–0) and PAOK (2–0).

== Players ==
=== First-team squad ===
Squad at end of season

Note: Flags indicate national team as defined under FIFA eligibility rules; some limited exceptions apply. Players may hold more than one non-FIFA nationality.

No.	Pos.	Nation	Player
1	GK	CRO	Mario Galinović
2	DF	NGR	Joseph Enakarhire
3	DF	ESP	Josu Sarriegi
4	MF	BRA	Marcelo Mattos
5	DF	RSA	Nasief Morris
6	DF	GRE	Filipos Darlas
7	MF	GRE	Sotiris Ninis
8	DF	GRE	Giannis Goumas (captain)
9	MF	ARG	Sebastián Romero
10	MF	ARG	Ezequiel González
11	FW	GRE	Dimitrios Papadopoulos (vice-captain)
12	FW	POR	Hélder Postiga (on loan from F.C. Porto)
14	FW	GRE	Dimitris Salpingidis
15	DF	GRE	Takis Fyssas
18	GK	POL	Arkadiusz Malarz

No.	Pos.	Nation	Player
19	DF	CRO	Anthony Šerić
20	MF	GRE	Sotiris Leontiou
21	MF	GRE	Giorgos Karagounis (vice-captain)
22	MF	GRE	Alexandros Tziolis
23	DF	MOZ	Mate Junior Simao
24	DF	GRE	Loukas Vyntra
25	FW	SEN	Dame N'Doye
26	FW	GRE	Evangelos Mantzios
27	MF	AUT	Andreas Ivanschitz
29	DF	SWE	Mikael Nilsson
30	MF	GRE	Elini Dimoutsos
31	DF	GRE	Nikos Spiropoulos
33	GK	GRE	Orestis Karnezis
36	FW	POR	Manucho (on loan from Manchester United)

=== Squad changes for the 2007–08 season ===
In: Note: Flags indicate national team as defined under FIFA eligibility rules; some limited exceptions apply. Players may hold more than one non-FIFA nationality.

No.	Pos.	Nation	Player
36	FW	POR	Manucho (on loan from Manchester United)
28	FW	GRE	Antonis Petropoulos (signed from Egaleo)
31	DF	GRE	Nikos Spiropoulos (signed from Panionios)
12	FW	POR	Hélder Postiga (on loan from F.C. Porto)
15	DF	GRE	Takis Fyssas (signed from Hearts)
3	DF	ESP	Josu Sarriegi (signed from Athletic Bilbao)
2	DF	NGR	Joseph Enakarhire (on loan from FC Dynamo Moscow)
21	MF	GRE	Giorgos Karagounis (signed from S.L. Benfica)
4	MF	BRA	Marcelo Mattos (signed from Corinthians)
25	FW	SEN	Dame N'Doye (signed from Academica)
18	GK	POL	Arkadiusz Malarz (signed from Skoda Xanthi)
30	MF	GRE	Elini Dimoutsos (signed from Ilisiakos)
33	GK	GRE	Orestis Karnezis (signed from OFI)

Out: Note: Flags indicate national team as defined under FIFA eligibility rules; some limited exceptions apply. Players may hold more than one non-FIFA nationality.

No.	Pos.	Nation	Player
—	MF	ESP	Víctor Sánchez (released)
—	MF	CRO	Igor Bišćan (released)
—	DF	SWE	Mikael Antonsson (to F.C. Copenhagen)
—	DF	GRE	Ilias Kotsios (to AEL)
—	MF	CRO	Srđan Andrić (to Hajduk Split)
—	GK	CMR	Pierre Ebéde (released)
—	GK	GRE	Alexandros Tzorvas (to OFI)
—	MF	BRA	Ricardo Bóvio (loan return to Málaga)
—	MF	GRE	Giorgos Theodoridis (to Ergotelis)

Out on loan: Note: Flags indicate national team as defined under FIFA eligibility rules; some limited exceptions apply. Players may hold more than one non-FIFA nationality.

No.	Pos.	Nation	Player
—	GK	GRE	Georgios Sikalias (on loan to Ethnikos Asteras)
—	GK	GRE	Michalis Vellidis (on loan to Diagoras)
—	GK	GRE	Petros Kravaritis (on loan to AO Koropi)
—	FW	GRE	Antonis Petropoulos (on loan to OFI)
—	DF	GRE	Stefanos Siontis (on loan to Kerkira)
—	MF	GRE	Alexandros Konstantidis (on loan to AO Koropi)
—	DF	GRE	Avgerinos Katranas (on loan to Panetolikos)
—	DF	GRE	Giannis Zaradoukas (on loan to Panseraikos)
—	DF	GRE	Giannis Stathis (on loan to Ilisiakos)
—	DF	GRE	Alexandros Pagalis (on loan to Fostiras)

== Club ==
=== The management ===
Position	Staff
Manager	(Portugal) José Peseiro
Assistant manager	(Portugal) Eduardo Gonsalves
Team Manager	(Greece) Grigoris Papavasiliou
Goalkeeping Coach	(Croatia) Goran Zivanovic
Team doctor	(Greece) Giorgos Papatheou

Last updated: 26 February 2008
Source: pao.gr

=== Other information ===
Chairman	(Greece) Argiris Mitsou
Ground (capacity and dimensions)	Leoforos Alexandras Stadium (16,620 / 105x68 m)

Source: pao.gr

== Competitions ==
=== Super League Greece ===
==== Regular season ====
===== League table =====
Pos	Team	Pld	W	D	L	GF	GA	GD	Pts	Qualification or relegation
1	Olympiacos (Note: The match of Apollon Kalamarias against Olympiacos, originally ended 1–0 to the home side, but later was awarded to Olympiacos 0–3 by the Greek sports court giving Olympiacos the three points, on the basis that the home side fielded an ineligible player (Roman Wallner). Apollon were deducted by one point.) (C)	30	21	7	2	58	23	+35	70	Qualification for the Champions League third qualifying round
2	AEK Athens	30	22	2	6	65	17	+48	68	Qualification for the Play-offs
3	Panathinaikos	30	20	6	4	44	18	+26	66	Qualification for the Play-offs
4	Aris	30	14	8	8	32	20	+12	50	Qualification for the Play-offs
5	Panionios	30	13	6	11	39	42	−3	45 (Note: Head-to-head record: Panionios–AEL 3–1, AEL–Panionios 1–0.)	Qualification for the Play-offs

Source: Super League Greece
Rules for classification: 1st points; 2nd head-to-head points; 3rd head-to-head goal difference; 4th decision match.
According to the official Super League playoff regulation, the position after the playoffs replaces the regular season position.
(C) Champions

===== Results summary =====
Overall								Home						Away					
Pld	W	D	L	GF	GA	GD	Pts	W	D	L	GF	GA	GD	W	D	L	GF	GA	GD
30	20	6	4	44	18	+26	66	12	3	0	21	4	+17	8	3	4	23	14	+9

Last updated: 20 April 2008.
Source: Competitive matches

===== Results by round =====
Round	1	2	3	4	5	6	7	8	9	10	11	12	13	14	15	16	17	18	19	20	21	22	23	24	25	26	27	28	29	30
Ground	H	A	H	A	A	H	A	H	A	H	A	A	H	A	H	A	H	A	H	H	H	A	A	H	A	H	H	A	H	A
Result	D	W	W	L	W	W	W	W	D	D	W	L	W	W	W	D	W	W	W	W	W	W	D	W	L	D	W	L	W	W
Position	7	4	2	4	3	2	2	1	2	2	3	3	3	3	3	3	3	3	2	2	2	1	1	1	2	2	2	3	3	3

Source: League matches
A = Away; H = Home; W = Win; D = Draw; L = Loss

===== Matches =====
2 September 2007 1	Panathinaikos	0–0	Olympiacos	Athens
21:15				Stadium: Leoforos Alexandras Stadium; Attendance: 13,430; Referee: Giorgos Kasnaferis

23 September 2007 2	Ergotelis	0–3	Panathinaikos	Heraklion
21:15			Romero 19', 52'; Salpingidis 75'	Stadium: Pankritio Stadium; Attendance: 7,950; Referee: Anastasios Kakos

29 September 2007 3	Panathinaikos	2–0	PAOK	Athens
19:00	Karagounis 43' (pen.); Salpingidis 83'			Stadium: Leoforos Alexandras Stadium; Attendance: 10,048; Referee: Vassilis Terovitsas

7 October 2007 4	Asteras Tripolis	1–0	Panathinaikos	Tripoli
19:00	Rogerio 51' (pen.)			Stadium: Asteras Tripolis Stadium; Attendance: 4,026; Referee: Romanos Kontogiannidis

21 October 2007 5	Veria	0–2	Panathinaikos	Veria
19:00			Ivanschitz 49'; Salpingidis 90+2'	Stadium: Veria Stadium; Attendance: 3,332; Referee: Kyros Vassaras

28 October 2007 6	Panathinaikos	2–0	Atromitos	Athens
19:00			Papadopoulos 19'; Salpingidis 53'	Stadium: Leoforos Alexandras Stadium; Attendance: 7,114; Referee: Iraklis Tsikinis

4 November 2007 7	Levadiakos	0–4	Panathinaikos	Levadia
16:45			Salpingidis 7'; Ivanschitz 22'; Tziolis 54'; Mantzios 82'	Stadium: Levadia Municipal Stadium; Attendance: 2,491; Referee: Theodoros Gaitatzis

11 November 2007 8	Panathinaikos	2–1	AEK Athens	Athens
19:00	Salpingidis 6'; Mantzios 34'		Liberopoulos 42'	Stadium: Leoforos Alexandras Stadium; Attendance: 15,202; Referee: Dimitris Kalopoulos

25 November 2007 9	AEL	2–2	Panathinaikos	Larissa
19:00	Cleyton 23'; Galitsios 48'		Tziolis 15'; Mattos 86'	Stadium: Alkazar; Attendance: 6,502; Referee: Anastasios Kakos

1 December 2007 10	Panathinaikos	0–0	Skoda Xanthi	Athens
19:00				Stadium: Leoforos Alexandras Stadium; Attendance: 8,122; Referee: Giorgos Kasnaferis

9 December 2007 11	Iraklis	0–1	Panathinaikos	Thessaloniki
19:00			Katsabis 28' (o.g.)	Stadium: Kaftanzoglio Stadium; Attendance: 4,976; Referee: Vassilis Pamporidis

15 December 2007 12	Panionios	1–0	Panathinaikos	Neas Smyrni
19:00	Djebbour 42'			Stadium: Nea Smyrni Stadium; Attendance: 3,085; Referee: Dimitris Kalopoulos

23 December 2007 13	Panathinaikos	3–1	OFI	Athens
19:00	Mantzios 6'; Issa 77' (o.g.); Salpingidis 81'		Nwafor 76'	Stadium: Leoforos Alexandras Stadium; Attendance: 5,254; Referee: Stavros Tritsonis

30 December 2007 14	Aris	0–1	Panathinaikos	Thessaloniki
19:00			Papadopoulos 44' (o.g.)	Stadium: Kleanthis Vikelidis Stadium; Attendance: 12,416; Referee: Anastasios Kakos

6 January 2008 15	Panathinaikos	1–0	Apollon Kalamarias	Athens
16:45	Salpingidis 90+2' (pen.)			Stadium: Leoforos Alexandras Stadium; Attendance: 12,350; Referee: Mihalis Germanakos

13 January 2008 16	Olympiacos	1–1	Panathinaikos	Piraeus
19:00	N'Doye 14'		Antzas 45+1'	Stadium: Karaiskakis Stadium; Attendance: 31,310; Referee: Dimitris Kalopoulos

20 January 2008 17	Panathinaikos	1–0	Ergotelis	Athens
19:00	Salpingidis 44'			Stadium: Leoforos Alexandras Stadium; Attendance: 7,052; Referee: Giorgos Daloukas

27 January 2008 18	PAOK	0–1	Panathinaikos	Thessaloniki
19:00	Salpingidis 34'			Stadium: Toumba Stadium; Attendance: 19,000; Referee: Vassilis Pamporidis

3 February 2008 19	Panathinaikos	2–0	Asteras Tripolis	Athens
19:00	N'Doye 76'; Salpingidis 88'			Stadium: Leoforos Alexandras Stadium; Attendance: 12,252; Referee: Dimitris Kirkos

9 February 2008 20	Panathinaikos	1–0	Veria	Athens
19:00	Ivanschitz 74'			Stadium: Leoforos Alexandras Stadium; Attendance: 5,507; Referee: Stavros Tritsonis

24 February 2008 22	Panathinaikos	1–0	Levadiakos	Athens
19:00	Goumas 11'			Stadium: Leoforos Alexandras Stadium; Attendance: 7,413; Referee: Nikos Datis

2 March 2008 23	AEK Athens	1–1	Panathinaikos	Marousi
19:00	Rivaldo 67' (pen.)		Postiga 78'	Stadium: Olympic Stadium; Attendance: 40,610; Referee: Kyros Vassaras

5 March 2008 21	Atromitos	0–1	Panathinaikos	Peristeri
18:30			Sarriegi 52'	Stadium: Peristeri Stadium; Attendance: 4,802; Referee: Michalis Koukoulakis

9 March 2008 24	Panathinaikos	2–0	AEL	Athens
19:00	Manucho 62'; Salpingidis 86'			Stadium: Leoforos Alexandras Stadium; Attendance: 13,308; Referee: Kyros Vassaras

16 March 2008 25	Skoda Xanthi	3–2	Panathinaikos	Xanthi
19:00	Radzinski 10', 58', 68'		Postiga 70'; Salpingidis 76'	Stadium: Skoda Xanthi Arena; Attendance: 4,398; Referee: Anastasios Kakos

22 March 2008 26	Panathinaikos	1–1	Iraklis	Athens
19:00	Goumas 17'		Fonseca 13'	Stadium: Leoforos Alexandras Stadium; Attendance: 10,012; Referee: Nathanail Charalampidis

30 March 2008 27	Panathinaikos	2–1	Panionios	Athens
19:00	Papadopoulos 75' (pen.); Salpingidis 80' (pen.)		Djebbour 45+2' (pen.)	Stadium: Leoforos Alexandras Stadium; Attendance: 6,092; Referee: Dimitris Kirkos

6 April 2008 28	OFI	4–1	Panathinaikos	Heraklion
19:00	Drulić 32' (pen.); Simić 44'; Sfakianakis 52'; Popović 77'		Salpingidis 40'	Stadium: Pankritio Stadium; Attendance: 7,161; Referee: Mihalis Germanakos

13 April 2008 29	Panathinaikos	1–0	Aris	Athens
19:00	Karagounis 74'			Stadium: Leoforos Alexandras Stadium; Attendance: 5,032; Referee: Vasileios Paboridis

20 April 2008 30	Apollon Kalamarias	1–3	Panathinaikos	Thessaloniki
19:00	Barkoglou 38'		Galanopoulos 5', 72' (o.g.); Papadopoulos 44'	Stadium: Kalamaria Stadium; Attendance: 915; Referee: Georgios Stathopoulos

==== Play-offs ====
===== League table =====
Pos	Team	Pld	W	D	L	GF	GA	GD	Pts	Qualification
2	Panathinaikos	6	4	2	0	14	5	+9	21	Qualification for the Champions League second qualifying round
3	AEK Athens	6	2	2	2	10	11	−1	16	Qualification for the UEFA Cup second qualifying round
4	Aris (Note: Aris were guaranteed at least to play in the 2008–09 UEFA Cup second qualifying round through their Greek Cup performance.)	6	1	2	3	9	9	0	7	Qualification for the UEFA Cup second qualifying round
5	Panionios	6	1	2	3	7	15	−8	5	Qualification for the Intertoto Cup second round

Source: Super League Greece
Rules for classification: 1) points; 2) head-to-head points; 3) head-to-head goal difference; 4) head-to-head goals scored; 5) goal difference; 6) number of goals scored.

===== Results summary =====
Overall								Home						Away					
Pld	W	D	L	GF	GA	GD	Pts	W	D	L	GF	GA	GD	W	D	L	GF	GA	GD
6	4	2	0	14	5	+9	14	3	0	0	10	2	+8	1	2	0	4	3	+1

Last updated: 20 April 2008.
Source: Competitive matches

===== Results by round =====
Round	1	2	3	4	5	6
Ground	A	H	A	H	H	A
Result	D	W	W	W	W	D
Position	3	2	2	2	2	2

Source: League matches
A = Away; H = Home; W = Win; D = Draw; L = Loss

===== Matches =====
23 April 2008 1	Aris	1–1	Panathinaikos	Thessaloniki
19:00	Koke 74'		Papadopoulos 87' (pen.)	Stadium: Kleanthis Vikelidis Stadium; Attendance: 6,140; Referee: Dimitrios Kyrkos

30 April 2008 2	Panathinaikos	4–1	AEK Athens	Athens
19:00	Papadopoulos 8'; Mattos 27'; Ivanschitz 32', 45'		Rivaldo 71'	Stadium: Leoforos Alexandras Stadium; Attendance: 8,528; Referee: Dimitris Kalopoulos

4 May 2008 3	Panionios	1–2	Panathinaikos	Nea Smyrni
21:00	Djebbour 74'		Manucho 16', 82'	Stadium: Nea Smyrni Stadium; Attendance: 1,996; Referee: Ilias Stavridis

7 May 2008 4	Panathinaikos	3–0	Panionios	Athens
19:00	Karagounis 21', 43'; Manucho 64' (pen.)			Stadium: Leoforos Alexandras Stadium; Attendance: 4,003; Referee: Christoforos Zografos

11 May 2008 5	Panathinaikos	3–1	Aris	Athens
19:00	Karagounis 63', 65'; N'Doye 62'		Thiago 73'	Stadium: Leoforos Alexandras Stadium; Attendance: 15,420; Referee: Anastasios Kakos

14 May 2008 6	AEK Athens	1–1	Panathinaikos	Marousi
19:00	Nsaliwa 51'		Mattos 26'	Stadium: Olympic Stadium; Attendance: 5,032; Referee: Kyros Vassaras

=== Greek Cup ===
Panathinaikos entered the Greek Cup at the Round of 32.

==== Matches ====
31 October 2007 Round of 32	Ethnikos Asteras	1–3	Panathinaikos	Kaisariani
17:45 EET	Beniskos 66'	Report	N'Doye 20'; Mantzios 25', 49'	Stadium: Michalis Kritikopoulos Stadium; Attendance: 2,017; Referee: Dimitrios Kalopoulos (Macedonia)

16 January 2008 Round of 16	Olympiacos	4–0	Panathinaikos	Piraeus
21:30 EET	LuaLua 6'; Torosidis 63'; Kovačević 65'; Núñez 79'	Report		Stadium: Karaiskakis Stadium; Attendance: 30,147; Referee: Anastasios Kakos (Corfu)

=== UEFA Cup ===
==== First round ====
20 September 2007 First leg	Artmedia Petržalka (Slovakia)	1–2	(Greece) Panathinaikos	Bratislava, Slovakia
20:15 CET	Urbánek 46'		Papadopoulos 61' (pen.); N'Doye 90'	Stadium: Tehelné pole Attendance: 3,981; Referee: Bruno Paixão (Portugal)

2 October 2007 Second leg	Panathinaikos (Greece)	3–0 (5–1 agg.)	(Slovakia) Artmedia Petržalka	Athens, Greece
17:45 CET	Papadopoulos 45' (pen.), 45+2', 74' (pen.)			Stadium: Leoforos Alexandras Stadium; Attendance: 6,200; Referee: Serge Gumienny (Belgium)

==== Group B ====
Pos	Team	Pld	W	D	L	GF	GA	GD	Pts	Qualification	ATL	PAN	ABE	FCK	LOK
1	(Spain) Atlético Madrid	4	3	1	0	9	4	+5	10	Advance to knockout stage	—	2–1	2–0	—	—
2	(Greece) Panathinaikos	4	3	0	1	7	2	+5	9	Advance to knockout stage	—	—	3–0	—	2–0
3	(Scotland) Aberdeen	4	1	1	2	5	6	−1	4	Advance to knockout stage	—	—	—	4–0	1–1
4	(Denmark) Copenhagen	4	1	0	3	1	7	−6	3		0–2	0–1	—	—	—
5	(Russia) Lokomotiv Moscow	4	0	2	2	4	7	−3	2		3–3	—	—	0–1	—

25 October 2007 1	Panathinaikos (Greece)	3–0	(Scotland) Aberdeen	Athens, Greece
18:00 CET	Goumas 11'; Papadopoulos 73'; Salpingidis 77'	Report		Stadium: Leoforos Alexandras Stadium; Attendance: 8,154; Referee: Thomas Einwaller (Austria)

8 November 2007 2	Copenhagen (Denmark)	0–1	(Greece) Panathinaikos	Copenhagen, Denmark
20:15 CET		Report	N'Doye 15'	Stadium: Parken Stadium; Attendance: 25,142; Referee: Vladimír Hriňák (Slovakia)

5 December 2007 3	Panathinaikos (Greece)	2–0	(Russia) Lokomotiv Moscow	Athens, Greece
20:45 CET	Salpingidis 70', 74'	Report		Stadium: Leoforos Alexandras Stadium; Attendance: 7,013; Referee: Claudio Circhetta (Switzerland)

20 December 2007 4	Atlético Madrid (Spain)	2–1	(Greece) Panathinaikos	Madrid, Spain
20:45 CET	L. García 74'; Simão 90+6'	Report	Salpingidis 34'	Stadium: Vicente Calderón; Attendance: 14,000; Referee: Knut Kircher (Germany)

==== Knockout stage ====
===== Round of 32 =====
13 February 2008 First leg	Rangers (Scotland)	0–0	(Greece) Panathinaikos	Glasgow, Scotland
21:00 CET		(Report)		Stadium: Ibrox Stadium; Attendance: 45,203; Referee: Nicola Rizzoli (Italy)

21 February 2008 Second leg	Panathinaikos (Greece)	1–1 (1–1a agg.)	(Scotland) Rangers	Athens, Greece
18:00 CET	Goumas 12'	(Report)	Novo 81'	Stadium: Leoforos Alexandras Stadium; Attendance: 14,452; Referee: Felix Brych (Germany)

== Team kit ==
=== 2007 ===
Supplier: Adidas
Sponsor(s): Cosmote

Home	Away	Third

Source: pao.gr

=== 2008 ===
Supplier: Adidas
Sponsor(s): Cosmote

Home	Away	Third

Source: pao.gr
