= 2005–06 Panathinaikos F.C. season =

Panathinaikos
2005–06 season
- Chairman: Argiris Mitsou
- Manager: Alberto Malesani
- Ground: Olympic Stadium
- Alpha Ethniki: 3rd
- Greek Cup: 4th round
- Champions League: Group Stage
- Top goalscorer: League: Theofanis Gekas (15); All: Theofanis Gekas (15)
- Highest home attendance: 59,096 vs Olympiacos (28 August 2005)
- Lowest home attendance: 7,049 vs Kallithea (19 February 2006)
- Average home league attendance: 21,883
Home colours	Away colours	Third colours

In the 2005–06 season Panathinaikos played for 47th consecutive time in Greece's top division, Alpha Ethniki. They also competed in UEFA Champions League and Greek Cup. Season started with Hans Backe as team manager.

== Players ==
=== First-team squad ===
Squad at end of season

Note: Flags indicate national team as defined under FIFA eligibility rules; some limited exceptions apply. Players may hold more than one non-FIFA nationality.

No.	Pos.	Nation	Player
1	GK	CRO	Mario Galinović
3	DF	GRE	Filipos Darlas
4	DF	GRE	Ilias Kotsios
5	DF	RSA	Nasief Morris
6	MF	BRA	Flávio Conceição
7	FW	GRE	Theofanis Gekas
8	DF	GRE	Giannis Goumas (captain)
9	FW	POL	Emmanuel Olisadebe
10	MF	ARG	Ezequiel González
11	FW	GRE	Dimitrios Papadopoulos (vice-captain)
12	GK	CMR	Pierre Ebede
14	MF	NED	Nordin Wooter
15	MF	CRO	Srđan Andrić

No.	Pos.	Nation	Player
18	FW	ROU	Lucian Sânmărtean
19	DF	CRO	Anthony Seric
20	MF	GRE	Angelos Basinas
21	MF	CYP	Kostas Charalambidis
22	MF	GRE	Alexandros Tziolis
24	DF	GRE	Loukas Vyntra
25	DF	CRO	Igor Bišćan
26	FW	GRE	Evangelos Mantzios
27	MF	GRE	Sotiris Leontiou
28	MF	GRE	Giorgos Theodoridis
29	DF	SWE	Mikael Nilsson
30	GK	GRE	Alexandros Tzorvas
40	FW	HUN	Sandor Torghelle

== Competitions ==
=== Alpha Ethniki ===
==== League table ====
Pos	Team	Pld	W	D	L	GF	GA	GD	Pts	Qualification or relegation
1	Olympiacos (C)	30	23	1	6	63	23	+40	70	Qualification for Champions League group stage
2	AEK Athens	30	21	4	5	42	20	+22	67 (Note: Head-to-head points (goal difference): AEK 3 (+2), Panathinaikos 3 (-2).)	Qualification for Champions League third qualifying round
3	Panathinaikos	30	21	4	5	55	23	+32	67	Qualification for UEFA Cup first round
4	Iraklis	30	15	6	9	39	31	+8	51	Qualification for UEFA Cup first round
5	Skoda Xanthi	30	13	8	9	31	25	+6	47	Qualification for UEFA Cup first round

Source: Galanis Sports Data
Rules for classification: 1) Points; 2) Head-to-head points; 3) Head-to-head goal difference; 4) Goal difference; 5) Goals scored; 6) Goals against; 7) Play-offs (neutral ground); 8) Draw.
(Note: Criterion 7 is only used if needed to decide champion, teams for relegation or teams for UEFA competitions).
(C) Champions

==== Matches ====
28 August 2005 1	Panathinaikos	0–2	Olympiacos	Athens
21:00			Stoltidis 35'; Đorđević 86'	Stadium: Olympic Stadium; Attendance: 59,096; Referee: Athanassios Briakos

11 September 2005 2	Ionikos	1–1	Panathinaikos	Piraeus
20:45	Makor 7'		González 52' (pen.)	Stadium: Neapoli Stadium; Attendance: 2,466; Referee: Theofilos Fotiadis

18 September 2005 3	Levadiakos	0–0	Panathinaikos	Livadeia
21:00				Stadium: Levadia Municipal Stadium; Attendance: 4,473; Referee: Iraklis Tsikinis

24 September 2005 4	Panathinaikos	3–0	Panionios	Athens
20:00	Mantzios 6'; González 15'; Goumas 37'			Stadium: Olympic Stadium; Attendance: Behind closed doors Referee: Christoforos Zografos

1 October 2005 5	Kallithea	2–4	Panathinaikos	Athens
19:45	Telkiyski 33'; Georgiev 38'		Gekas 40', 70'; Kotsios 64'; Wooter 90+4'	Stadium: Grigoris Lambrakis Stadium; Attendance: 4,250; Referee: Michalis Germanakos

15 October 2005 6	Panathinaikos	1–0	Akratitos	Athens
20:00	Mantzios 5'			Stadium: Olympic Stadium; Attendance: 47,968; Referee: Dimitrios Styliaras

23 October 2005 7	AEK Athens	3–0	Panathinaikos	Athens
21:00	Liberopoulos 83'; Chanko 88'; Lakis 90+1'			Stadium: Olympic Stadium; Attendance: 28,623; Referee: Kyros Vassaras

30 October 2005 8	Panathinaikos	1–0	PAOK	Athens
17:00	Mantzios 14'			Stadium: Olympic Stadium; Attendance: 21,538; Referee: Vasileios Terovitsas

6 November 2005 9	OFI	0–2	Panathinaikos	Heraklion
19:00			Conceição 65'; Papadopoulos 68'	Stadium: Pankritio Stadium; Attendance: 7,707; Referee: Vasileios Paboridis

19 November 2005 10	Panathinaikos	3–0	Apollon Kalamarias	Athens
19:00	Mantzios 27'; Goumas 83'; Šerić 85'			Stadium: Olympic Stadium; Attendance: 7,469; Referee: Antonios Kouklakis

26 November 2005 11	Panathinaikos	2–1	Skoda Xanthi	Athens
19:30	Andrić 22'; Mantzios 42'		Garpozis 35'	Stadium: Olympic Stadium; Attendance: 11,414; Referee: Vasileios Paboridis

3 December 2005 12	Atromitos	1–0	Panathinaikos	Athens
16:45	Korakakis 90+4'			Stadium: Peristeri Stadium; Attendance: 2,607; Referee: Dimitrios Dabosis

11 December 2005 13	Panathinaikos	2–2	Iraklis	Athens
20:00	González 28' (pen.); Gekas 64'		Epalle 12'; Kapetanos 86'	Stadium: Olympic Stadium; Attendance: 11,414; Referee: Vasileios Paboridis

18 December 2005 14	Egaleo	0–2	Panathinaikos	Athens
19:00			Mantzios 67'; Bišćan 79'	Stadium: Stavros Mavrothalassitis Stadium; Attendance: 1,176; Referee: Konstantinos Finokaliotis

7 January 2006 15	Panathinaikos	3–0	AEL	Athens
19:15	Gekas 57', 77'; Tziolis 82'			Stadium: Olympic Stadium; Attendance: 11,066; Referee: Kyros Vassaras

15 January 2006 16	Olympiacos	3–2	Panathinaikos	Piraeus
19:00	Rivaldo 37', 58'; Konstantinou 73'		González 20' (pen.); Gekas 74'	Stadium: Karaiskakis Stadium; Attendance: 31,480; Referee: Dimitrios Kalopoulos

29 January 2006 17	Panathinaikos	1–0	Ionikos	Athens
19:30	Gekas 8'			Stadium: Olympic Stadium; Attendance: 9,138; Referee: Dimitrios Styliaras

4 February 2006 18	Panathinaikos	2–0	Levadiakos	Athens
19:15	Goumas 19'; Gekas 37'			Stadium: Olympic Stadium; Attendance: 10,624; Referee: Charalampos Karatzas

12 February 2006 19	Panionios	2–4	Panathinaikos	Athens
19:30	Luciano 48'; Leontiou 61' (o.g.)		Kotsios 72'; Mantzios 83'; Gekas 89'; Papadopoulos 90+2'	Stadium: Nea Smyrni Stadium; Attendance: 4,107; Referee: Charalampos Karatzas

19 February 2006 20	Panathinaikos	2–0	Kallithea	Athens
19:30	Gekas 52'; Papadopoulos 90'			Stadium: Olympic Stadium; Attendance: 7,049; Referee: Ioannis Flambouris

26 February 2006 21	Akratitos	0–2	Panathinaikos	Athens
20:00			Papadopoulos 1'; Gekas 61'	Stadium: Yiannis Pathiakakis Stadium; Attendance: 935; Referee: Antonios Kouklakis

5 March 2006 22	Panathinaikos	1–0	AEK Athens	Athens
19:15	Bišćan 52'			Stadium: Olympic Stadium; Attendance: 31,446; Referee: Giorgos Kasnaferis

11 March 2006 23	PAOK	0–1	Panathinaikos	Thessaloniki
15:00			Papadopoulos 65'	Stadium: Toumba Stadium; Attendance: Behind closed doors Referee: Romanos Kontogiannidis

19 March 2006 24	Panathinaikos	3–1	OFI	Athens
19:15	Papadopoulos 38', 49'; Bišćan 76'		Obinna 39'	Stadium: Olympic Stadium; Attendance: 10,050; Referee: Giorgos Kasnaferis

26 March 2006 25	Apollon Kalamarias	0–1	Panathinaikos	Thessaloniki
20:00			González 75' (pen.)	Stadium: Kalamaria Stadium; Attendance: 2,640; Referee: Anastasios Kakos

2 April 2006 26	Skoda Xanthi	1–1	Panathinaikos	Xanthi
19:00	Zuela 81'		Gekas 64'	Stadium: Skoda Xanthi Arena; Attendance: 6,189; Referee: Apostolos Nikolaidis

9 April 2006 27	Panathinaikos	4–3	Atromitos	Athens
19:00	Gekas 21', 80'; Papadopoulos 23'; Charalambidis 28'		Merino 3'; Djebbour 29', 73'	Stadium: Olympic Stadium; Attendance: 10,176; Referee: Dimitrios Kalopoulos

16 April 2006 28	Iraklis	1–0	Panathinaikos	Thessaloniki
19:00	Herrera 33'			Stadium: Kaftanzoglio Stadium; Attendance: 11,844; Referee: Romanos Kontogiannidis

30 April 2006 29	Panathinaikos	4–0	Egaleo	Athens
20:00	Gekas 14'; Zapropoulos 25' (o.g.); Papadopoulos 58', 68'			Stadium: Olympic Stadium; Attendance: 7,719; Referee: Vasileios Paboridis

14 May 2006 30	AEL	0–3	Panathinaikos	Larissa
20:00			Goumas 61'; Mantzios 63'; Andrić 80'	Stadium: Alcazar Stadium; Attendance: 8,478; Referee: Giannis Tsachilidis

=== Greek Cup ===
==== Matches ====
9 November 2005 Round of 32	Ergotelis	1–0	Panathinaikos	Heraklion
19:00 EET	Kovács 89' (pen.)	Report		Stadium: Pankritio Stadium; Attendance: 10,930; Referee: Ioannis Tsachilidis (Piraeus)

=== UEFA Champions League ===
==== Qualifying phase ====
===== Third qualifying round =====
9 August 2005 First leg	Wisła Kraków (Poland)	3–1	(Greece) Panathinaikos	Kraków, Poland
20:45	Brożek 13'; Uche 52'; Frankowski 70'	Report	Olisadebe 4'	Stadium: Stadion Miejski; Attendance: 7,225; Referee: Claus Bo Larsen (Denmark)

23 August 2005 Second leg	Panathinaikos (Greece)	4–1 (a.e.t.) (5–4 agg.)	(Poland) Wisła Kraków	Athens, Greece
20:45	Morris 62'; Olisadebe 65'; Papadopoulos 87'; Kotsios 114'	Report	Sobolewski 78'	Stadium: Olympic Stadium; Attendance: 43,750; Referee: Mike Riley (England)

==== Group C ====
Pos	Team	Pld	W	D	L	GF	GA	GD	Pts	Qualification
1	(Spain) Barcelona	6	5	1	0	16	2	+14	16	Advance to knockout stage
2	(Germany) Werder Bremen	6	2	1	3	12	12	0	7	Advance to knockout stage
3	(Italy) Udinese	6	2	1	3	10	12	−2	7	Transfer to UEFA Cup
4	(Greece) Panathinaikos	6	1	1	4	4	16	−12	4	

Source: RSSSF

14 September 2005 1	Udinese (Italy)	3–0	(Greece) Panathinaikos	Udine, Italy
20:45	Iaquinta 28', 73', 76'	Report		Stadium: Stadio Friuli; Attendance: 21,398; Referee: Olegário Benquerença (Portugal)

27 September 2005 2	Panathinaikos (Greece)	2–1	(Germany) Werder Bremen	Athens, Greece
20:45	González 5' (pen.); Mantzios 8'	Report	Klose 41'	Stadium: Olympic Stadium; Attendance: 31,450; Referee: Eric Poulat (France)

18 October 2005 3	Panathinaikos (Greece)	0–0	(Spain) Barcelona	Athens, Greece
20:45		Report		Stadium: Olympic Stadium; Attendance: 56,804; Referee: Frank De Bleeckere (Belgium)

2 November 2005 4	Barcelona (Spain)	5–0	(Greece) Panathinaikos	Barcelona, Spain
20:45	Van Bommel 1'; Eto'o 14', 40', 65'; Messi 34'	Report		Stadium: Camp Nou; Attendance: 64,321; Referee: Rene Temmink (Netherlands)

22 November 2005 5	Panathinaikos (Greece)	1–2	(Italy) Udinese	Athens, Greece
20:45	Charalambidis 45+1'	Report	Iaquinta 81'; Candela 83'	Stadium: Olympic Stadium; Attendance: 30,147; Referee: Graham Poll (England)

7 December 2005 6	Werder Bremen (Germany)	5–1	(Greece) Panathinaikos	Bremen, Germany
20:45	Micoud 2' (pen.); Valdez 28', 31'; Klose 51'; Frings 90+1'	Report	Morris 53'	Stadium: Weserstadion; Attendance: 36,550; Referee: Peter Fröjdfeldt (Sweden)
