= Leontiou =

Leontiou (Greek: Λεοντίου) is a Greek surname. Notable people with the surname include:

- Kristian Leontiou (born 1982), English singer
- Sotiris Leontiou (born 1984), Greek footballer
