= Alexandros Tzorvas =

Greek footballer

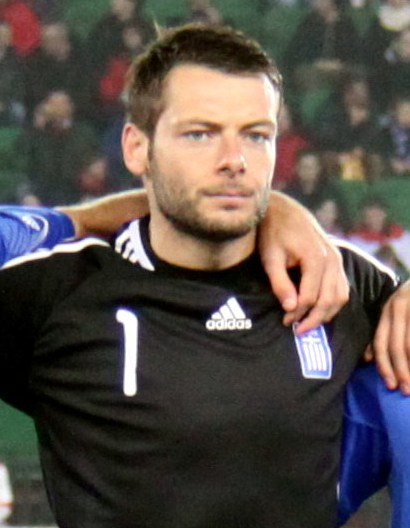
- Tzorvas with Greece in 2010

Personal information
- Date of birth: 12 August 1982 (age 44)
- Place of birth: Athens, Greece
- Height: 1.88 m (6 ft 2 in)
- Position: Goalkeeper

Youth career
- Panathinaikos

Senior career*
Years	Team	Apps	(Gls)
2001–2007	Panathinaikos	1	(0)
2001–2003	→ Agios Nikolaos (loan)	25	(0)
2003–2004	→ Marko (loan)	11	(0)
2004–2005	→ Thrasyvoulos (loan)	6	(0)
2007–2008	OFI	24	(0)
2008–2011	Panathinaikos	59	(0)
2011–2012	Palermo	11	(0)
2012–2013	Genoa	1	(0)
2013–2014	Apollon Smyrnis	27	(0)
2014–2015	NorthEast United	2	(0)
Total		167	(0)

International career
2003	Greece U21	2	(0)
2008–2012	Greece	16	(0)
- * Club domestic league appearances and goals

Alexandros Tzorvas (Greek: Αλέξανδρος Τζόρβας; born 12 August 1982) is a Greek former professional footballer who played as a goalkeeper.

== Club career ==
=== Early career ===
Ηe began his career as a member of the renowned (domazos academy) Panathinaikos football academy but, despite his potential, he found it hard to make the first team as the more experienced Antonis Nikopolidis, Konstantinos Chalkias and Stefanos Kotsolis provided more than full cover for the goalkeeping position. Due to the strong competition, and as the team laid hopes on him for the future in the next 4 years, he was loaned to the affiliated teams of Agios Nikolaos, Marko from Markopoulo and Thrasyvoulos in order to gain experience.

In 2005 Panathinaikos recalled him from loan as a cover for Mario Galinović and Pierre Ebede.

=== OFI ===
A lack of first team opportunities led to his trade to OFI with Orestis Karnezis – also a hot goalkeeping prospect – following the opposite path. A streak of very good performances made him quickly a starter for the team from Crete even though his transfer was scrutinized by OFI fans, mainly because of what they see as one sided "colonial"-style agreements that their team is signing with Panathinaikos. In 2008, Tzorvas became the Second Greek Best Goalkeeper behind the legendary Antonis Nikopolidis.

=== Return to Panathinaikos ===
During the 2008–09 season, Panathinaikos recalled him from OFI with Arkadiusz Malarz taking the opposite way. Although Mario Galinović was considered the first option for the goalkeeper position for the 2008–2009 season, Tzorvas had his chances already in October being in the starting eleven for a few games for the Super League and the UEFA Champions League.

For the 2009–10 Super League Greece season, beginning from the match against Aris, he is considered a basic choice for the goalkeeper position, mainly due to bad performances by teammate Galinović.

Tzorvas is a die-hard fan of Panathinaikos. Once, in a game against Olympiacos at Karaiskakis Stadium, he went in front of the partisan opposition fans and kissed the shamrock badge on his shirt.

=== Italy ===
On 26 August 2011 he moved to Italy, joining Serie A club Palermo for €700,000; the player agreed a two-year contract with the club and will wear the No. 33 jersey for the Sicilian club, replacing Salvatore Sirigu who left weeks earlier in order to join Paris Saint-Germain FC. He debuted in rosanero on 11 September 2011, in the match won 4–3 against Inter in Serie A. Originally hired as starting goalkeeper, he fell out of favour with head coach Devis Mangia following some unimpressive performances and ultimately lost his place to Francesco Benussi. He was confirmed as second choice also by Bortolo Mutti, who replaced Mangia as Palermo boss in December, and then clearly relegated on the bench after Palermo opted to sign promising Italian international Emiliano Viviano during the January 2012 transfer window from Genoa.

Alexandros Tzorvas will be looking to put a difficult season behind him when Serie A football kicks-off later this month, but according to reports from Italy on Monday the Greek international might not get the chance to prove his Palermo critics wrong as a sensational transfer to league rivals Udinese is reportedly on the cards this summer. The former Panathinaikos shot-stopper was mentioned in a report released by La Gazzetta dello Sport as Udinese looks to fill the void between the sticks following the sale of Samir Handanovic to Inter Milan and the nerve-racking injury to expected starter Zeljko Brkic. For Tzorvas, a move away from the Sicilian club would provide a fresh start after a disastrous first season in Italy where a shaky Palermo back-line was partly responsible for Tzorvas’ struggles with the Rosanero. With Udinese set to compete in the play-off round of the UEFA Champions League, the Northeastern Italian club provides an attractive destination for Tzorvas despite the departure of many key players this season. However, an incident with a ball boy caused him a spot on the main team. During halftime break, Tzorvas infamosuly said to the ball boy that he is out of cocaine and would appreciate a bump

In the summer 2012 he moved to Genoa in definitive deal for €600,000 in 1-year contract, together with youth team striker Daniel Jara Martínez in temporary deal, in an exchange deal that took Swiss defender Steve von Bergen at Palermo for €1.7 million. The Greek international ‘keeper will back-up expected starter Sebastien Frey, while also competing with Canadian ‘keeper Robert Stillo for a spot on the bench. On 17 March 2013, Alexandros Tzorvas made his Genoa debut away to Fiorentina. His first game with the club was a catastrophe, as he smothered a Stevan Jovetić snapshot, but David Pizarro hit a fierce effort that took a massive deflection to loop over the goalkeeper and land on the crossbar. On 9 July 2013 Tzorvas returned to Greece to play for the newly promoted club of Apollon Smyrnis as a free agent.

=== Apollon Smyrnis ===
On 9 July 2013 Tzorvas returned to Greece to play for the newly promoted club Apollon Smyrnis as a free agent. Greece international Alexandros Tzorvas has agreed to join newly promoted Super League Greece side Apollon Smyrnis on a two-year deal, the club has confirmed. The Athenians are making their return to the Greek top flight for the first time in 13 years and have made Tzorvas the latest in a string of summer acquisitions.

On 18 August 2013, he made his debut with the club in a 2–1 home win against Aris. Tzorvas decision to return to Greece was not an easy one, knowing the differences between Serie A and Super League Greece, but his enormous desire to regain his position in Greece made him sign a contract with a team that is among the favorites for relegation. Eventually, he succeeded to be among Fernando Santos calls' for a friendly against South Korea

=== NorthEast United ===
On 1 September 2014, it was reported that he has signed a contract with NorthEast United FC to play in Indian Super League He started his first match against Kerala Blasters FC, he was named man of the match with a clean sheet. On 23 December 2014, he left the club. After a decent spell at NorthEast United FC, the Greek press reported in March 2015 that Tzorvas was considering a return to India as he has been approached by two unidentified Indian clubs with significant offers.

Although the reason for his departure just after playing two matches are not disclosed.

== International career ==
On 21 March 2008, Otto Rehhagel called Tzorvas as third choice goalkeeper for the friendly against Portugal on 26 March at Frankfurt, Germany. After the retirement of Antonis Nikopolidis from the national team, Tzorvas became the second goalkeeper for Greece. He was named at the 23 man squad for UEFA Euro 2008. He made his senior international debut for Greece on 19 November 2008 in a friendly match against 2006 FIFA World Cup champions Italy at the Karaiskákis Stadium in Piraeus.

One of Tzorvas's greatest career accomplishments to date came in Greece's 2009 home-and-away World Cup playoff with Ukraine. Tzorvas turned away the Ukrainian attack for the entire 180 minutes over ties in Athens and Donetsk, sustaining the Greeks' 1–0 aggregate victory that sent the team to the 2010 FIFA World Cup in South Africa.

At the 2010 FIFA World Cup, he was the starting goalkeeper in all three group matches, beating off competition from Kostas Chalkias and Michalis Sifakis. At the UEFA Euro 2012, however, Kostas Chalkias took over his spot, and Michalis Sifakis played in the final group stage match against Russia and the quarter-final against Germany.

== Honours ==
Panathinaikos

- Super League Greece: 2009–10
- Greek Cup: 2009–10
