= Fillip Rodrigues =

Brazilian footballer (born 1981)

Personal information
- Full name: Fillip Rodrigues da Silva
- Date of birth: 23 November 1981 (age 44)
- Place of birth: Brazil
- Height: 1.75 m (5 ft 9 in)
- Position: Midfielder

Senior career*
Years	Team	Apps	(Gls)
2003–2004	AD Cabofriense		
2004–2007	Kerkyra	62	(12)
2007–2008	PAS Giannina	13	(0)
2007–2008	Mesquita	14	(1)
2009–2010	APOP Kinyras Peyias	20	(1)
2011	America-RJ	4	(0)
2011	Botafogo-SP		
2012	Thrasyvoulos	18	(7)
2012–2013	Kallithea	11	(0)
- * Club domestic league appearances and goals

Fillip Rodrigues da Silva (born 23 November 1981) is a Brazilian former footballer.

Before returning to Brazil in 2011, he played for several Greek clubs for six years.
