= Nikos Boutzikos =

Greek professional footballer

Personal information
- Full name: Nikolaos Boutzikos
- Date of birth: 6 September 1989 (age 37)
- Place of birth: Polygyros, Greece
- Height: 1.73 m (5 ft 8 in)
- Position: Defender

Team information
- Current team: Dionysiou Chalkidiki

Youth career
- Panathinaikos

Senior career*
Years	Team	Apps	(Gls)
2007–2010	Panathinaikos	1	(0)
2008–2010	→ Kerkyra (loan)	29	(0)
2010–2012	Panthrakikos	9	(0)
2012	Anagennisi Giannitsa	9	(0)
2013	Doxa Drama	33	(2)
2013–2014	Panegialios	1	(0)
2014–2016	Olympiacos Volos	31	(0)
2016	Apollon Smyrnis	5	(0)
2016–2017	Agrotikos Asteras	22	(0)
2017–2018	Panachaiki	20	(0)
2018–2021	Olympiacos Volos	62	(5)
2022–2023	Kampaniakos	28	(0)
2024–	Dionysiou Chalkidiki		

International career^{‡}
2007–2009	Greece U-19	8	(0)
- * Club domestic league appearances and goals as of 14 November 2017 ‡ National team caps and goals as of 19 September 2011

Nikos Boutzikos (Greek: Νίκος Μπουτζίκος, born 6 September 1989) is a Greek professional footballer.

== Career ==
Boutzikos is a product of Panathinaikos' youth team, and before being scouted by the club he played amateur football for clubs in Chalkidiki.

On 25 January 2007, Boutzikos signed a 5-year professional contract with Panathinaikos. Boutzikos made his first team debut for the club in a post-season play-off match against AEK on 14 May 2008.
