= Ricardo Bóvio =

Brazilian footballer (born 1982)

Personal information
- Full name: Ricardo Bóvio de Souza
- Date of birth: January 17, 1982 (age 44)
- Place of birth: Campos dos Goytacazes, Brazil
- Height: 1.78 m (5 ft 10 in)
- Position: Defensive midfielder

Youth career
- 1995–2001: Vasco da Gama

Senior career*
Years	Team	Apps	(Gls)
2001–2002	Vasco da Gama	15	(2)
2003	Chernomorets	19	(0)
2004–2006	Santos	48	(0)
2006	Málaga	17	(1)
2006–2007	→ Panathinaikos (loan)	24	(1)
2007–2008	Profute		
2008	Corinthians		
2008–2009	Al-Shabab		
2009	→ Figueirense (loan)	5	(0)
2010	→ Ceará (loan)		
2010	→ Tombense (loan)		
2011	Villa Nova	8	(0)
2012	Bonsucesso	10	(1)
2013–2016	Goytacaz		

Managerial career
- 2016: Goytacaz
- * Club domestic league appearances and goals

Ricardo Bóvio de Souza (born January 17, 1982), known as Ricardo Bóvio, is a Brazilian former professional footballer who played as a defensive midfielder.

== Career ==
Bóvio was born in Campos dos Goytacazes, Rio de Janeiro. He began his career as a youth in Vasco da Gama in 1995 and stayed there until 2002 season. Ricardo Souza was transferred to Russian side FC Chernomorets Novorossiysk but he could not adjust to the local climate and the following year returned to Brazil for Santos FC. Bóvio's next career station was Málaga CF but the club board decided to loan him to Greek side Panathinaikos F.C. with a purchase clause of €2 million.

In summer 2007, he was signed for Profute.

In January 2008, he joined Corinthians Paulista.

In June 2008, he joined Al-Shabab in Saudi Arabia.
