= Sebastián Romero (footballer, born 1978) =

Argentine footballer (born 1978)

Personal information
- Full name: Sebastián Ariel Romero
- Date of birth: 27 April 1978 (age 48)
- Place of birth: Berisso, Argentina
- Height: 1.73 m (5 ft 8 in)
- Position: Winger

Team information
- Current team: Racing Club (interim)

Senior career*
Years	Team	Apps	(Gls)
1996–1999	Gimnasia La Plata	79	(11)
1999–2000	Betis	30	(0)
2001	Toulouse	7	(1)
2001–2002	Córdoba	13	(0)
2002–2006	Racing Club	116	(14)
2006–2008	Panathinaikos	36	(4)
2008–2010	Gimnasia La Plata	65	(10)
2010–2011	Banfield	25	(2)
2011–2016	Quilmes	135	(11)
2016–2017	Gimnasia La Plata	16	(0)
2017–2018	Quilmes	9	(0)

International career
1997	Argentina U20	3	(0)
2005	Argentina	1	(0)

Managerial career
- 2021–2022: Gimnasia La Plata (reserves)
- 2023: Gimnasia La Plata
- 2025–: Racing Club (reserves)
- 2026: Racing Club (interim)
- 2026–: Racing Club (interim)
- * Club domestic league appearances and goals

Sebastián Ariel Romero (born 27 April 1978, in Berisso), nicknamed Chirola, is an Argentine football coach and former player who played as a winger. He is the current interim manager of Racing Club.

== Playing career ==
While playing for Gimnasia y Esgrima (LP), Romero came to prominence as a key member of Argentina Under-20's victorious 1997 FIFA World Youth Championship team in Malaysia. He has played for clubs in Argentina, Spain, France, and Greece. After 3 seasons at Club de Gimnasia y Esgrima La Plata, he moved to Europe to play for Real Betis, Toulouse FC, and Córdoba CF.

In 2002, Romero transferred back to Argentina for 1.5 million dollars to play for Racing Club, and played 4 seasons for Racing before leaving Argentina again, this time to play for Panathinaikos. In Panathinaikos, he played for two seasons. Then, in 2008, he came back to Gimnasia to help in its fight against relegation. He had a very good season in 2008–2009, but his 2009–2010 season was mediocre, falling out of favor with Diego Cocca, the then coach of Gimnasia. In both seasons, Gimnasia was able to stay in Argentina's top league.

Romero joined Banfield for the 2010-11 Argentine Primera División season. Then, in July 2011, he joined Quilmes, then in Argentina's second division. Quilmes won promotion to the top league at the end of the 2011–2012 season.

At the end of 2019, Chirola left Quilmes, having scored 13 goals in 153 matches since joining the club in 2011.

He has one cap with the national team of Argentina.
