= Aris Galanopoulos =

Greek footballer

Personal information
- Full name: Aristidis Galanopoulos
- Date of birth: 29 September 1981 (age 45)
- Place of birth: Kalamata, Greece
- Height: 1.79 m (5 ft 10 1/2 in)
- Position: Defender

Senior career*
| Years | Team | Apps | (Gls) |
| 1999–2004 | Kalamata | 116 | (1) |
| 2005 | Panionios | 18 | (0) |
| 2006–2008 | Apollon Kalamarias | 67 | (0) |
| 2008–2010 | Panserraikos | 63 | (2) |
| 2010–2012 | OFI | 46 | (0) |
| 2012–2013 | Enosis Neon Paralimni | 14 | (0) |
| 2013 | Glyfada | 11 | (0) |
| 2014 | Paniliakos | 10 | (0) |
| 2014–2015 | Apollon 1926 | 13 | (0) |
| 2015–2016 | Kalamata | (?) | (?) |

International career^{‡}
| 2002–2003 | Greece U21 | 13 | (0) |
| 2004 | Greece Olympic | 1 | (0) |
- * Club domestic league appearances and goals as of 1 July 2015 ‡ National team caps and goals as of June 2003

Aris Galanopoulos (Greek: Άρης Γαλανόπουλος; born 29 September 1981) is a Greek former professional footballer who played as a defender.

== Club career ==
Galanopoulos began his playing career by signing with Kalamata in August 1999. He was called for Greece U21 at December 2002 being key member, although his club was relegated to Football League in 2001. In January 2005 he signed with Panionios in which he played just one year. In January 2006 he joined Apollon Kalamarias, where he played until the end of the 2007–08 season . Then he signed to Panserraikos, up to the 2009–10 season. Then he played for two consecutive years at OFI and in 2012 went to Cyprus to Enosis Neon Paralimni.

== International career ==
In December 2002 Galanopoulos was called to play for Greece U21 and was a key member for the team. Galanopoulos competed for Greece at the 2004 Summer Olympics.
