= Giannis Goumas =

Greek footballer and manager

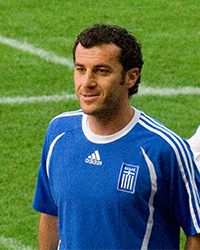
- Goumas in 2008

Personal information
- Full name: Ioannis Goumas
- Date of birth: 24 May 1975 (age 51)
- Place of birth: Ampelonas, Greece
- Height: 1.84 m (6 ft 0 in)
- Position: Centre back

Youth career
- –1992: Ampeloniakos
- 1992–1994: Panathinaikos

Senior career*
Years	Team	Apps	(Gls)
1994–2009	Panathinaikos	286	(27)

International career
1995–1997	Greece U21	21	(0)
1997–2008	Greece	45	(0)

Managerial career
- 2012: Glyfada
- 2013: Pefki
- 2013–2014: Skoda Xanthi (assistant)
- 2014–2019: Greece U18
- 2014–2019: Greece U19
- 2019–2021: Greece U21
- 2022: Ermis Aradippou
- 2022–2023: PAO Rouf
- 2025–2026: PAS Giannina
Medal record
Men's football
Representing Greece
UEFA European Championship
Winner	2004
- * Club domestic league appearances and goals

Giannis Goumas (Greek: Γιάννης Γκούμας, born 24 May 1975) is a Greek professional football manager and former player, who spent his whole senior career at Panathinaikos.

== Playing career ==
=== Club ===
Born on 24 May 1975 in the village of Ampelonas, near Larisa, Goumas is one of the many players to emerge from Panathinaikos F.C.'s youth academy and served the club for 15 years, debuting for the first team in 1994. Playing as a central defender, Goumas was known for his tough tackling, excellent aerial ability and his unusual ability to score goals, often with spectacular shots. Goumas has also scored some very important and impressive goals during his career against Real Madrid, Juventus and Glasgow Rangers in European competitions and the title-deciding goal against rivals Olympiakos, in 2004.

The 34-year-old parted company with Panathinaikos in late June 2009 by mutual consent, ending his career with the Greens after 277 league appearances, and 27 goals. In September, Goumas announced his retirement from professional football.

=== International ===
Goumas was a regular member of the Greece national team since making his debut in February 1999 against Finland. He was part of the Greece squad that won the UEFA Euro 2004.

== Managerial career ==
On 30 May 2012, he was announced as the head coach of Glyfada, replacing Murat Seropian.

On 3 December 2014, Goumas took officially the technical leadership of the Greece U19 as announced by the EPO. The historical defeat of our team to 10-0 from Switzerland U19 was the end of Vasilis Tzalokostas from the technical leadership. The veteran ace of Panathinaikos will be responsible for both U18 and U19 national teams. Prior to that Goumas has worked in Skoda Xanthi.

== Career statistics ==
Appearances and goals by club, season and competition
Club	Season	League			Greek Cup		Europe		Total	
Club	Season	Division	Apps	Goals	Apps	Goals	Apps	Goals	Apps	Goals
Panathinaikos	1994–95	Alpha Ethniki	2	0			–		2	0
Panathinaikos	1995–96	Alpha Ethniki	8	0			2	0	10	0
Panathinaikos	1996–97	Alpha Ethniki	17	2	2	0	–		19	2
Panathinaikos	1997–98	Alpha Ethniki	26	1	3	0	–		29	1
Panathinaikos	1998–99	Alpha Ethniki	26	1	3	1	7	0	36	2
Panathinaikos	1999–00	Alpha Ethniki	28	7	3	0	6	0	37	7
Panathinaikos	2000–01	Alpha Ethniki	22	0	2	0	12	2	36	2
Panathinaikos	2001–02	Alpha Ethniki	14	1	3	0	8	1	25	2
Panathinaikos	2002–03	Alpha Ethniki	21	0	5	0	9	1	35	1
Panathinaikos	2003–04	Alpha Ethniki	25	4	7	2	7	0	39	6
Panathinaikos	2004–05	Alpha Ethniki	20	2	2	0	6	0	28	2
Panathinaikos	2005–06	Alpha Ethniki	22	4	1	0	3	0	26	4
Panathinaikos	2006–07	Alpha Ethniki	24	1	6	0	4	0	34	1
Panathinaikos	2007–08	Alpha Ethniki	21	2	2	0	5	2	28	4
Panathinaikos	2008–09	Alpha Ethniki	10	2	1	0	7	0	18	2
Career total			286	27	40	3	76	6	402	36

== Managerial statistics ==
Team	Year	Record				
Team	Year	G	W	D	L	Win %
Greece U18	2014–2019	16	9	1	6	56.25
Greece U19	2014–2019	58	25	14	19	43.10
Greece U21	2019–2021	12	4	2	6	33.33
Ermis Aradippou	2022	13	3	3	7	23.08
PAO Rouf	2022–2023	21	3	3	15	14.29
PAS Giannina	2025–2026	18	4	4	10	22.22
Career total		138	48	27	63	34.78

== Honours ==
Panathinaikos

- Super League: 1995, 1996, 2004
- Greek Cup: 1995, 2004; runner-up: 1997–98, 1998–99, 2006–07

Greece

- European Championship: 2004

Greece U21

- UEFA European Under-21 Championship runner-up: 1998

== See also ==
- List of one-club men in association football
