= Alexandros Tziolis =

Greek footballer (born 1985)

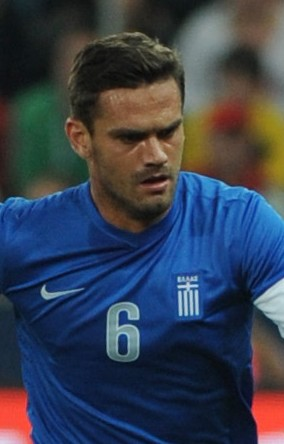
- Tziolis with Greece in 2013

Personal information
- Date of birth: 13 February 1985 (age 41)
- Place of birth: Katerini, Greece
- Height: 1.90 m (6 ft 3 in)
- Position: Midfielder

Team information
- Current team: OFI (assistant manager)

Youth career
- 1995–2002: Apollon Litochoro

Senior career*
Years	Team	Apps	(Gls)
2002–2005	Panionios	63	(3)
2005–2009	Panathinaikos	84	(5)
2009	→ Werder Bremen (loan)	15	(1)
2009–2011	Siena	13	(0)
2010–2011	→ Racing Santander (loan)	10	(0)
2011–2012	Racing Santander	12	(0)
2012–2013	Monaco	3	(0)
2012–2013	→ APOEL (loan)	30	(0)
2013–2017	PAOK	66	(3)
2014	→ Kayserispor (loan)	15	(0)
2017	Heart of Midlothian	16	(1)
2017–2019	Al-Fayha	54	(3)
Total		381	(16)

International career
2001–2005	Greece U21	13	(3)
2006–2018	Greece	75	(2)

Managerial career
- 2024: Volos (assistant)
- 2024: Panathinaikos (assistant)
- 2024: Al-Fayha (assistant)
- 2025: Panathinaikos (assistant)
- 2025–: OFI (assistant)
- * Club domestic league appearances and goals

Alexandros Tziolis (Greek: Αλέξανδρος Τζιόλης; born 13 February 1985) is a Greek former professional footballer who played as a defensive midfielder.

He was a Greek international from 2005 until his international retirement in 2018. He won 75 caps, scoring twice. He appeared in two World Cups (2010, 2014) and Euro 2008.

== Club career ==
=== Panionios ===
Tziolis began his playing career as a teenager in a local team called Apollon Litochorou. He played there for about seven years and in 1995, a Panionios scouter spotted his talent and brought him to Athens. He was an integral part of Panionios team for three seasons, playing 61 matches and scoring three goals. As a result, Panathinaikos offered Panionios €650,000 and signed him.

=== Panathinaikos ===
Tziolis initially established himself as a first-team player for Panathinaikos ahead of Igor Biscan during the 2006–07 season. In April 2007, he scored a goal helping his club break Skoda Xanthi's unbeaten home run in the Super League Greece and secure a place in the Greek Cup final against AEL.

By the end of 2007–08 season Tziolis was close to his exit from Panathinaikos but new manager Henk Ten Cate chose to keep him. After being mostly left out of the starting lineup in the beginning of 2008–09 season, he was included in the team in November and was voted "Man of the Match" in a 3–0 win in Germany against Werder Bremen in the UEFA Champions League, where he scored the third goal for Panathinaikos. He went on to again established himself, linking well with teammates Gilberto Silva and Simao Mate Junior. In his time at Panathinaikos, he made in all his competitions 113 appearances (six goals, eight assists) with the club.

==== Loan to Werder Bremen ====
On 7 January 2009, joined Bundesliga side Werder Bremen on a half-season loan, for a fee of €300,000. Werder Bremen secured the right to sign him permanently for a fee of €1.6 million.

Tziolis played a regular role in Bremen's midfield and helped the club to make the UEFA Cup final against Shaktar Donetsk, on 20 May 2009. In the final, he came on as a substitute for Peter Niemeyer in the 103rd minute. After having nearly scored the equalizing goal when Bremen were a goal behind, the team lost the final of the last UEFA Cup edition to Shaktar with a final score of 2–1. Tziolis also featured in Bremen's 1–0 victory over Bayer Leverkusen in the German Cup final the same season, where Tziolis won his first ever trophy in professional football.

=== AC Siena ===
On 29 January 2010, Serie A club AC Siena, coached by former Panathinaikos coach Alberto Malesani, signed Tziolis for a fee of €1.4 million. He made his debut in the league on 7 February 2010 against Sampdoria. Tziolis was a regular for Siena, while the team was relegated to the Serie B.

==== Loan to Racing Santander ====
In August 2010, Tziolis moved to La Liga side Racing Santander on a one-year loan deal. In October 2010, he suffered a leg break in the 1–0 defeat of Latvia. Racing Santander announced that recuperation would be between four and six months.

After a successful league campaign in the second half of the season Racing Santander signed him permanently from Siena for an undisclosed fee.

=== Monaco ===
In January 2012, Tziolis joined AS Monaco for a reported transfer fee of €200,000.

==== Loan to APOEL ====
On 31 August 2012, Tziolis joined Cypriot side APOEL on a season-long loan deal from AS Monaco.

During his loan spell at APOEL, he became a league champion for the first time in his career, appearing in all but two of the league matches and helping his team to win the Cypriot First Division.

=== PAOK ===
On 25 June 2013, Tziolis signed a three-year contract with Greek Super League side PAOK. On 17 August, he made his league debut in a 3–0 home win against Xanthi. On 22 December 2013, he scored his first goal with the club in a home victory against Levadiakos. He was among the key players of PAOK in the first half of the 2013–14 season. In the winter transfer window he signed with Süper Lig team Kayserispor with the stated intention of securing his selection for the Greece national team for the 2014 World Cup. At the beginning of 2014–15 season, Tziolis returned to PAOK and played 34 games in all competitions scoring one goal for the Greek Cup. On 27 November 2015, Tziolis in the UEFA Europa League match against Gabala FK achieved 400 appearances with all his clubs for all competitions. Tziolis' contract with PAOK would expire at the end of 2015–16 season, with the stipulation that it would have been automatically renewed if that season he had played at least 70% of team's matches. In December 2015 the club stated it wanted to keep the international midfielder for many years and that Tziolis had a first meeting with technical director Frank Arnesen, to speak about the terms of a contract extension. On 19 August 2016, PAOK officially announced the 2016–17 season did not include the international midfielder. On 28 January 2017, it was announced that his contract with PAOK had been terminated. He left the club having made 111 appearances (four goals, five assists) in all competitions.

==== Loan to Kayserispor ====
On 31 January 2014, Tziolis signed a six-month loan contract with Kayserispor with Kayserispor being given the option to sign him permanently for a fee of €1.5 million, Nine days later, he made his debut in the Süper Lig in an away loss against Elazigspor.

=== Heart of Midlothian ===
On 30 January 2017, Tziollis joined Scottish Premiership club, Heart of Midlothian on a six-month deal running to the end of the 2016–17 season. and made his Hearts debut in the 4–1 win against Rangers. On 4 February 2017, Tziolis scored his first goal as Ian Cathro's side beat 10-man Motherwell 3–0 at Fir Park. At the end of the season, he was released by the club.

=== Al-Fayha ===
On 4 August 2017, Tziolis signed a two-year contract with newly promoted Saudi Professional League club Al-Fayha FC. On 23 November 2017, he scored his debut goal with the club in a 3–1 home win game against Al-Shabab FC. On 2 July 2019, Tziolis departed Al-Fayha after a two-year stay with the Saudi club. Al-Fayha FC did not offer Tziolis a new contract. The 34-year-old joined Al-Fayha in 2017 and made 58 appearances across all competitions with three registered goals and assists. On 30 August 2019, he terminated his contract with the club.

== International career ==
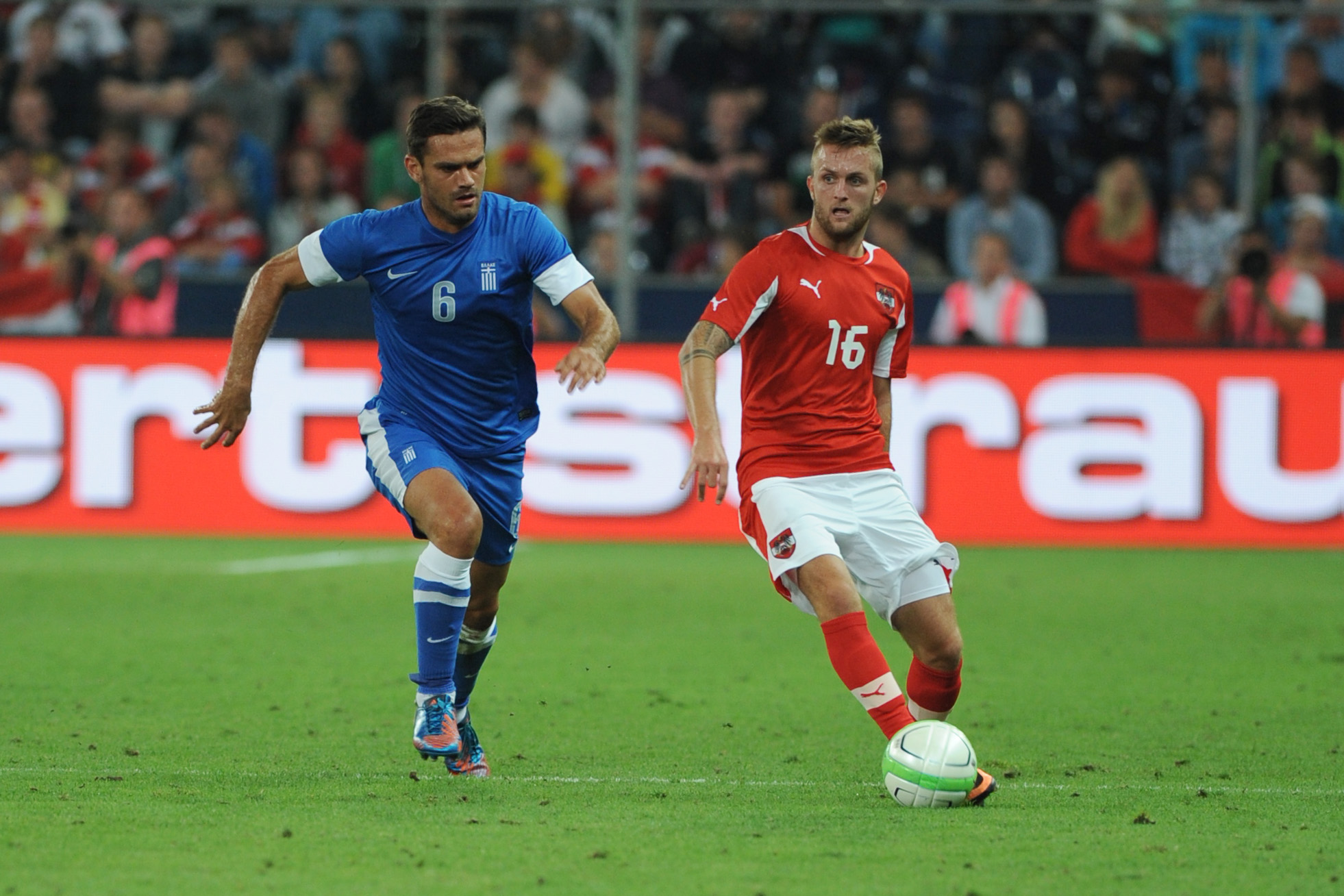
Tziolis with National Team

After representing his country 13 times for the U21 side, Tziolis made his international debut for Greece on 21 January 2006 in a friendly match against South Korea. He was included in the team that defending their UEFA Euro 2008 European championship. He played once, when he came on as a substitute in a 2–1 loss to Spain in the group-stage. He made four appearances in qualifying, including as a substitute in the play-off win away with Ukraine.

He was included in the squad for the 2010 FIFA World Cup. He played every minute of the tournament for his country, including their debut World Cup win over Nigeria on 17 June 2010.

He would be included in the team for two major events, but Greece coach Fernando Santos dropped Tziolis from his final 23-player squad for the UEFA Euro 2012. Tziolis had a poor season and would not get a regular spot in the Monaco team, in Ligue 2, while his performance in the last friendlies did little to change Santos's mind.

Two years later, Tziolis had an exceptional season in PAOK and Kayserispor which resulted in being called by Santos for the World Cup 30-man provisional team, and the final 23-man squad for the 2014 FIFA World Cup.

== Style of play ==
Tziolis is a tall defensive midfielder, good in air, with powerful long shots. He plays a "silent" role in the game, and he tends to occupy the role of a deep-lying playmaker more than a defensive stopper.

== Career statistics ==
=== Club ===
Appearances and goals by club, season and competition
Club	Season	League			National Cup		Continental		Other		Total	
Club	Season	Division	Apps	Goals	Apps	Goals	Apps	Goals	Apps	Goals	Apps	Goals
Panionios	2002–03	Super League Greece	14	0	0	0	0	0	0	0	14	0
Panionios	2003–04	Super League Greece	21	3	0	0	1	0	0	0	22	3
Panionios	2004–05	Super League Greece	28	0	0	0	4	0	0	0	32	0
Panionios	Total		63	3	0	0	5	0	0	0	68	3
Panathinaikos	2005–06	Super League Greece	21	1	0	0	4	0	0	0	25	1
Panathinaikos	2006–07	Super League Greece	24	2	6	0	7	0	0	0	37	2
Panathinaikos	2007–08	Super League Greece	27	2	1	0	8	0	4	0	40	2
Panathinaikos	2008–09	Super League Greece	10	0	0	0	5	0	0	0	15	0
Panathinaikos	2009–10	Super League Greece	2	0	1	0	0	0	0	0	3	0
Panathinaikos	Total		84	5	8	0	24	0	4	0	120	5
Werder Bremen (loan)	2008–09	Bundesliga	15	1	4	0	8	0	0	0	27	1
Siena	2009–10	Serie A	13	0	0	0	0	0	0	0	13	0
Racing Santander (loan)	2010–11	La Liga	10	0	0	0	0	0	0	0	10	0
Racing Santander	2011–12	La Liga	12	0	4	1	0	0	0	0	16	1
Monaco	2011–12	Ligue 2	3	0	0	0	0	0	0	0	3	0
APOEL (loan)	2012–13	Cypriot First Division	30	0	0	0	0	0	0	0	30	0
PAOK	2013–14	Super League Greece	19	1	1	0	10	0	0	0	30	1
PAOK	2014–15	Super League Greece	20	0	2	1	7	0	5	0	34	1
PAOK	2015–16	Super League Greece	27	2	3	0	11	0	5	0	46	2
PAOK	2016–17	Super League Greece	0	0	0	0	1	0	0	0	1	0
PAOK	Total		66	3	6	1	29	0	10	0	111	4
Kayserispor (loan)	2013–14	Süper Lig	15	0	0	0	0	0	0	0	15	0
Heart of Midlothian	2016–17	Scottish Premiership	16	1	2	0	0	0	0	0	18	1
Al-Fayha	2017–18	Saudi Pro League	25	2	2	0	0	0	1	0	28	2
Al-Fayha	2018–19	Saudi Pro League	29	1	1	0	0	0	0	0	30	1
Al-Fayha	Total		54	3	3	0	0	0	1	0	58	3
Career total			381	16	27	2	66	0	15	0	489	18

=== International ===
Scores and results list Greece's goal tally first, score column indicates score after each Tziolis goal.

List of international goals scored by Alexandros Tziolis
No.	Date	Venue	Opponent	Score	Result	Competition
1	7 June 2011	Citi Field, New York City, United States	Ecuador	1–1	1–1	Friendly
2	7 October 2017	GSP Stadium, Nicosia, Cyprus	Cyprus	2–1	2–1	2018 FIFA World Cup qualification

== Honours ==
Werder Bremen

- German Cup: 2008–09
- UEFA Cup: runner-up 2008–09

Panathinaikos

- Greek Cup: runner-up 2006–07

APOEL

- Cypriot League: 2012–13

Individual

- Greek Young Footballer of the year: 2004
