= Vangelis Mantzios =

Greek footballer

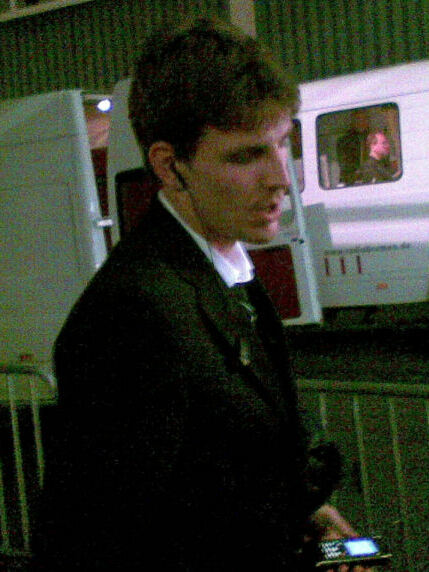
- Mantzios in 2008

Personal information
- Full name: Evangelos Mantzios
- Date of birth: 22 April 1983 (age 43)
- Place of birth: Athens, Greece
- Height: 1.91 m (6 ft 3 in)
- Position: Forward

Team information
- Current team: PAO Rouf

Youth career
- 1996–2001: Kallithea

Senior career*
Years	Team	Apps	(Gls)
2001–2005	Panionios	55	(11)
2005–2011	Panathinaikos	90	(23)
2008	→ Eintracht Frankfurt (loan)	10	(1)
2010	→ Anorthosis (loan)	14	(9)
2010–2011	→ Marítimo (loan)	1	(0)
2011–2012	OFI	22	(7)
2012–2013	Baku	8	(2)
2013	Atromitos	7	(1)
2013–2017	Levadiakos	101	(34)
2018	Apollon Smyrnis	6	(0)
2019	Olympiacos Volos	8	(7)
2019–2020	Levadiakos	15	(6)
2020–2022	PAO Rouf	6	(2)
Total		343	(103)

International career^{‡}
2005–2009	Greece	7	(0)
- * Club domestic league appearances and goals as of 8 August 2020 ‡ National team caps and goals as of 19 January 2009

Vangelis Mantzios (Greek: Βαγγέλης Μάντζιος; born 22 April 1983) is a Greek former professional footballer who played as a forward. He is the current technical director of Agios Ierotheos F.C. Academies.

== Club career ==
After establishing himself as one of the most talented young strikers in Greece during the first few years of his career at Panionios, Mantzios earned a transfer to Greek giants Panathinaikos in 2005.

In his first four seasons with Panathinaikos, Mantzios proved to be an important player, whether playing from the start or as a substitute – in total, scoring 18 goals in 68 Greek Super League matches and five goals in 20 European matches. One of his most notable achievements was scoring four goals in eight matches in the 2008–09 UEFA Champions League, helping Panathinaikos finish top of its group, ahead of Inter Milan, Werder Bremen and Anorthosis Famagusta FC.

In his last two seasons though, Mantzios struggled for playing time, with some tough new competition at the striker position, as Panathinaikos brought in prominent foreign strikers Djibril Cissé (Greek Super League top scorer in 2009–10 and 2010–11), Sebastián Leto and Sidney Govou, while generally employing a one-striker system. As a result, Panathinaikos sent Mantzios out on loan, to Anorthosis in 2009–10 (six goals in 14 games) and Portuguese club Marítimo in 2010–11 (only one match played, due to a knee injury).

Manztios' contract with Panathinaikos expired at the end of the 2010–11 season, and during the summer transfer period he joined Super League club OFI on a one-year contract. In 2011–12, Manztios was OFI's leading scorer with seven goals in 22 Super League matches.

In his last season though, Mantzios joined Baku for a total of 8 matches, before he returned to Greek Super League for Atromitos.

At the beginning of the 2013–14 season, he signed for Levadiakos for a two-year contract. On 18 August 2013, he made his debut with the club by scoring one goal in a 2–2 home draw against Panthrakikos.

In May 2013, Mantzios was awarded $280,000 from FK Baku by FIFA over unfulfilled contract obligations.

After his two years spell in Levadiakos, who got relegated, he came close to agree on moving to Platanias, though the club attacked to Mantzios for not following the oral agreement they had and eventually the deal didn't close. After that event, Mantzios was approached by Veria. On 1 July 2015, the two sides made an oral agreement, and both sides will sign the contract in a due course.

After various rumours concerning the future of the player, Mantzios renewed his contract with Levadiakos for €300,000 till the summer of 2017. He started the 2015–16 season by scoring the only goal in a 1–0 away win against Iraklis, following by two goals in the 2–1 home win against Asteras Tripolis. On 3 October 2015, he named man of the match giving the victory to his club in a 3–1 away win against Panthrakikos by scoring two goals and giving one assist. With these two goals he became the all-time top scorer of the club with 26 goals. On 18 October 2015, in the 7th day of the Greek Super League, with a penalty kick equalizing the score in a 2–2 home draw against Panetolikos.

On 23 December 2015, his excellent performance in the first half of the 2015–16 season, attracts the interest of many clubs. Greek club Olympoiacos would make a move in January transfer window, as the experienced international would be an excellent replacement of Alan Pulido. To complete this transfer, Olympiacos is willing to offer Levadiakos except from money the Comorian international forward El Fardou Ben Nabouhane, who arrived in Piraeus from Veria last summer but has not make a single appearance with the club yet. On 17 February 2016, Mantzios' penalty kick allowed Levadiakos to salvage a 1–1 draw with Atromitos for the postponed 16th matchday of Greek Super League. On 20 February 2016, Mantzios' penalty kick allowed Levadiakos to escape with a 1–0 home win against AEL Kalloni. By scoring in that game Mantzios has achieved an excellent 11/11 record at penalties in the Super League Greece. The all-time record stands since season 1989–90, when Hungarian star of Olympiacos Lajos Detari extended its record to 14/14. On 19 March 2016, he scored giving the lead to his club in a 2–2 away draw against Skoda Xanthi. On 17 April 2016, he scored in a 3–0 home win against AEK Athens for the last day of the 2015–16 season.

On 25 September 2016, he scored in a 2–1 home win against Kerkyra. It was his first goal for the 2016–17 season. On 4 December 2016, a drug substance that was taken under medical treatment in June 2016 gave the player a positive doping control after a 4–0 away loss against champions Olympiacos. Through his attorney-at-law, Yannis Marakakis, the 33-year-old striker stressed among other things that he was unaware of the composition of the drug he was given for treatment and that the "controversial" substance was taken out of the "non-race" period without offering a competitive advantage to the international player. Within the next few days he is expected to be summoned to the ESCAN Disciplinary Committee. As a result of the doping control result, the player did not play since 12 February 2017. At the end of the season he solved his contract with Levadiakos, having 109 appearances (36 goals, 10 assists) in all competitions.

After six months on 10 January 2018, he signed a contract with Gamma Ethniki club Egaleo for the rest of the 2017–18 season for an undisclosed fee, but it was not certain if he could play with the club due to legal issues with the ESCAN Disciplinary Committee. On 19 June 2018, he signed a contract with Super League club Apollon Smyrnis. On 24 January 2019, he signed a year contract with third tier- Football League Greece club Olympiacos Volos, but on 26 June 2019, he returned to his former club Levadiakos F.C. He was waived at the end of the season & then signed for PAO Rouf which he played for two seasons in Gamma Ethniki.

He announced his retirement from football on 31 August 2022 & he has since been working as the technical director of the Agios Ierotheos F.C. Academies. It was later revealed that he was banned again from competing after he tested positive for Oxilofrine. The punishment from the ESCAN Disciplinary Committee was set at 7 years.

== International career ==
Mantzios made his debut for Greece in a 2006 FIFA World Cup Qualifying match against Georgia in October 2005. His most recent cap came in a friendly match against Italy in November 2008.

== Honours ==
=== Club ===
Olympiacos Volos

- Gamma Ethniki: 2018–19

=== Individual ===
- Greek Young Footballer of the year: 2003
