= Nasief Morris =

South African soccer player (born 1981)

Personal information
- Full name: Mogammat Nasief Morris
- Date of birth: 16 April 1981 (age 45)
- Place of birth: Cape Town, South Africa
- Height: 1.76 m (5 ft 9 in)
- Position: Centre-back

Youth career
- Santos Cape Town

Senior career*
Years	Team	Apps	(Gls)
1998–2001	Santos Cape Town	19	(1)
2001–2003	Aris	48	(2)
2003–2010	Panathinaikos	118	(0)
2008–2009	→ Recreativo (loan)	37	(1)
2009–2010	→ Racing Santander (loan)	12	(1)
2010–2011	Apollon Limassol	13	(0)
2011–2012	SuperSport United	6	(0)
2012	→ Santos Cape Town (loan)	12	(0)
2012–2014	Santos Cape Town	49	(4)
2014–2017	Milano United	83	(13)
Total		397	(22)

International career
2004–2009	South Africa	37	(1)
- * Club domestic league appearances and goals

Mogammat Nasief Morris (born 16 April 1981) is a South African former professional soccer player who played as a central defender. He left his country in 2001 to pursue a career in Europe, going on to play mostly in Greece but also in Spain and Cyprus. Morris won 37 caps for the South Africa national team between 2004 and 2009.

== Club career ==
=== Greece ===
Born in Cape Town, Morris started his career at local Santos F.C. before signing for Greek club Aris Thessaloniki in June 2001, for €350.000. In his second season in the Super League he played 27 games (two goals) as the latter club finished in sixth position, thus qualifying to the UEFA Cup.

After two years, Morris joined fellow league side Panathinaikos FC. He made his UEFA Champions League debut on 1 October 2003 in a 1–1 group stage home draw against Rangers. During his five-year tenure he never appeared in less than 21 league matches, as his team won the double in the 2003–04 campaign; additionally, he made 14 Champions League and 18 UEFA Cup appearances.

=== Spain ===
At the beginning of 2008–09, Morris was loaned out to Recreativo de Huelva in Spain. He made his La Liga debut on 31 August 2008, playing the full 90 minutes in a 1–0 derby away win against Real Betis.

Morris only missed one league match for Recreativo, scoring on 3 May 2009 in 2–1 away triumph over CA Osasuna in the last minute, but Recre eventually suffered relegation. In the following season, still on loan, he moved to another Spanish top level team, Racing de Santander.

Morris started in his first games with Racing, but eventually was only third or fourth-choice stopper – 11 appearances in the first 15 rounds, only one in the following 23. On 5 May 2010, he was sent off in a 5–1 home loss against Sevilla FC.

=== Later years ===
In July 2010, after it was announced that Panathinaikos would not extend his contract with the club, Morris signed with Apollon Limassol from Cyprus. After one season, the 30-year-old returned to his country and joined SuperSport United FC.

== International career ==
Morris made his debut with the South Africa national team in 2004. In that same year, he was temporarily suspended by FIFA from all competitions after attempting to attack a referee during a 2–1 loss against Zambia on 21 February.

Morris was selected for the Bafana Bafana squad that appeared in the 2008 Africa Cup of Nations, in an eventual group stage exit in Ghana.

== Career statistics ==
Score and result list South Africa's goal tally first, score column indicates score after Morris goal.

List of international goals scored by Nasief Morris
No.	Date	Venue	Opponent	Score	Result	Competition
1	2 June 2007	Kings Park Stadium, Durban, South Africa	Chad	1–0	4–0	2008 Africa Cup of Nations qualification
