= Argiris Mitsou =

Greek surgeon (born 1950)

Dr. Argiris Mitsou (Greek: Αργύρης Μήτσου) (born April 7, 1950) is a Greek surgeon who for many years was the Greece national football team and Panathinaikos doctor. The Greek businessman Giannis Vardinogiannis (shareholder of Panathinaikos) promoted him as the club president in 2004, a position he held until June 2008, when Nikos Pateras was announced as the new team president.
