= Dimitrios Papadopoulos (footballer, born 1981) =

Greek former professional footballer (born 1981)

Dimitris Papadopoulos
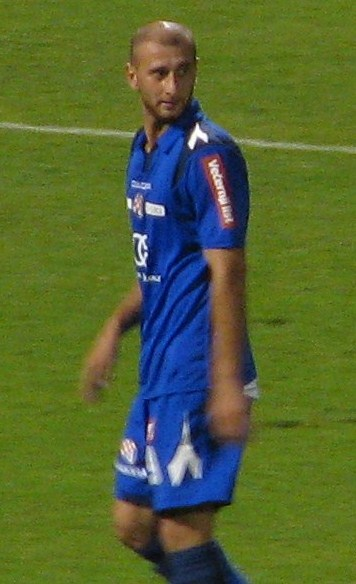
- Papadopoulos playing for Dinamo Zagreb in 2009

Personal information
- Full name: Dimitrios Papadopoulos
- Date of birth: 20 October 1981 (age 45)
- Place of birth: Gagarin, Uzbek SSR, Soviet Union
- Height: 1.78 m (5 ft 10 in)
- Position: Striker

Youth career
- 1989–1999: Akratitos

Senior career*
Years	Team	Apps	(Gls)
1999–2001	Akratitos	57	(20)
2001–2003	Burnley	39	(3)
2003–2008	Panathinaikos	126	(50)
2008–2009	Lecce	14	(1)
2009–2010	Dinamo Zagreb	13	(2)
2010–2012	Celta Vigo	25	(1)
2012	→ Levadiakos (loan)	10	(0)
2012–2013	Panthrakikos	25	(11)
2013–2014	Atromitos	35	(14)
2014–2015	PAOK	24	(7)
2015–2016	Asteras Tripolis	12	(1)
2016–2017	Atromitos	20	(1)
2017	Panetolikos	9	(1)
Total		409	(112)

International career^{‡}
2000–2002	Greece U21	27	(11)
2004	Greece Olympic	3	(1)
2002–2014	Greece	22	(2)
Medal record
Men's football
Representing Greece
UEFA European Championship
Winner	2004
- * Club domestic league appearances and goals as of 9 April 2017 ‡ National team caps and goals as of 5 March 2014

Dimitrios Papadopoulos (Greek: Δημήτριος Παπαδόπουλος; born 20 October 1981) is a Greek former professional footballer who played as a striker.

== Club career ==
=== Akratitos ===
Papadopoulos started his career from the youth academies of Greek minnows Akratitos, and made his debut in 1999, contributing to the team's promotion to Alfa Ethniki in 2001 for the first time in its history.

=== Burnley ===
Shortly after, Papadopoulos was transferred to Burnley in England, for a transfer fee reported to be €500,000. He stayed at the club for two seasons. In July 2003, Burnley sold Papadopoulos to Panathinaikos for a reported €200,000 including a sell-on clause in which Burnley could profit from future transfers.

=== Panathinaikos ===
Papadopoulos starred in his very first season with Panathinaikos becoming its top scorer with 17 goals in 26 games and winning the double with the club. It was the first championship in almost 10 years of Olympiacos domination in the Greek championship.

He was subsequently voted best footballer of that year in the league and was awarded a place in the Euro 2004 Greek squad that went on to win the tournament. He played in the game against Russia and had a contribution in the Greece goal that determined its qualification to the next round. He also took part in the Greek Olympic Football team during the Olympic Games of Athens 2004 in the very same summer.

An integral part of the Panathinaikos offence, he signed a three-year extension with the team in the summer of 2006 and his stellar performances were one of the reasons that the team's board let fellow starter Michalis Konstantinou leave the team.

=== Lecce ===
On 13 November 2008, Serie A club Lecce announced to have signed Papadopoulos in a free transfer. He made his Italian Serie A debut for Lecce on 18 January 2009 in a home match at the Stadio Via del Mare against Genoa coming on as a substitute for Gianni Munari late in the match. He scored his first goal in the Serie A on 19 April against Roma at the Stadio Olimpico.

=== Dinamo Zagreb ===
On 26 June 2009, he signed a three-year contract worth €650,000 annually with the Croatian champions Dinamo Zagreb. He contributed to Dinamo Zagreb, scoring goals to go forward in the Croatian cup and to win the Croatian League.

=== Celta Vigo ===
On 22 January 2010, Papadopoulos signed a contract with Celta Vigo until the end of the season. Things looked good for him but in late April, he got injured and was unable to play regularly. During the next summer, Celta Vigo signed striker David Rodríguez and winger Quique de Lucas in order to strengthen the squad. This relegated Papadopoulos to the position of third striker of the team and therefore he was not included in many of the team's lineups during that season. At the beginning of the 2010–11 season, Celta Vigo's manager Paco Herrera claimed that he would not count with Papadopoulos any more, putting pressure on him to leave the club due to his high salary and his poor performances. Although he played more than 20 matches, he failed to score more than a single goal. His contract was due to expire in 2013.

=== Levadiakos ===
In January 2012, Papadopoulos moved on loan to Levadiakos of the Greek Super League, but he failed to score a goal although the team finished in 7th place.

=== Panthrakikos ===
In the summer of 2012 he moved to Panthrakikos. He made his debut against his former team Panathinaikos, scoring the winning goal. On 8 October he scored a penalty in the 1–0 away victory against Levadiakos, another ex-team. On 11 November 2012, Papadopoulos scored his fourth goal of the season against Asteras Tripolis giving the victory to Panthrakikos and he was elected Man of the Match. On 26 November 2012 he scored two goals against Aris Thessaloniki allowing Panthrakikos to win 4–0. Papadopoulos had not scored two goals in one match of the Greek league since 26 November 2006. On 15 December 2012 he scored the second goal of the 2–0 away win against Kerkyra. On 16 January 2013 he made his first appearance in the Greek Cup after several years against Apollon Smyrnis replacing Leonidas Kyvelidis in the 78th minute. On 19 January 2013, he scored another goal against Panathinaikos at the Athens Olympic Stadium, drawing the goal of Toché. On 13 March 2013 he reached the semifinals of the Greek Cup with Panthrakikos. On 7 April 2013 he scored a penalty leading to a 3–1 win against OFI with this goal Papadopoulos reached 10 goals in the Greek Super League.

Papadopoulos was named Best Player of the Super League. The player of Panthrakikos stood out with his performances in the Greek Super League. He was the top goal-scorer of his team, scoring 11 times. In critical games, Papadopoulos excelled, helping his team to finish mid-table and avoid relegation comfortably. Panthrakikos also reached the semi-finals of the Greek Cup. PSAP spokesman Stamatis Sirigos added: "With his character, leadership skills and experience, Dimitros Papadopoulos helped his team-mates and boosted their confidence. All this combined with his ethos was recognised with his first position in the vote of professional footballers in Greece".

On the other hand, Papadopoulos put several frustrating campaigns behind him : "I always believed I could get my career back on track," he said at Monday's award ceremony in Athens. "I was given that chance at Panthrakikos, where we fought a tough war in order to secure our place in the league."

=== Atromitos ===
After a great season, in the summer of 2013 he signed a two-year contract with Atromitos, a team that got 4th place in the previous year of Greek Super League. He scored his first goal with the club on 17 August 2013, in a 2–2 home draw against Ergotelis.

On 30 August 2013 in a dramatic game against AZ Alkmaar for the UEFA Europa League, the latter beat Atromitos after fire caused a delay in playing the remaining 33 minutes. Spectators were evacuated after the match was halted in the 57th minute, with Atromitos leading 1–0, but trailing 3–2 on aggregate, through a goal from Dimitris Papadopoulos before play was stopped. When the action resumed next day, Thanasis Karagounis made it 2–0 in the second leg but the Greek team could not find a winning goal as the tie ended 3–3 on aggregate, with the Dutch side advancing into the group phase.

On a 0-0 cup game against the Greek giant Olympiacos after an excellent appearance, he said in front of TV : "We have a good team confronting any opponent. Our team has experienced players who know what to do in such games. In the first half Olympiacos pushing us so we could not keep the ball, and be aggressive. In the second half we got better and by entering Karamanos the whole match changed. Against Olympiakos we tried to have a good run defense, as our mail target was not to nil in the first match and see what happens in the second".

At the end of the 2013/14 regular season, he scored 14 league goals being the top scorer of his club. On 27 May 2014, Atromitos announced the end of their contract with the striker.

=== PAOK ===
On 29 August 2014, Papadopoulos, although, he was linked with Veria as they had an oral agreement, signed a contract with Super League Greece team PAOK for one year. On 18 September, he made his debut with the shirt of PAOK in the Europa League by scoring the fifth goal in the 6–1 victory of PAOK against Dinamo Minsk. The 22 September debut in the jersey of PAOK in the Greek Super League against Panaitolikos. 30 November marked his first goal in his new jersey, scoring in the 2–2 draw against Panthrakikos, his former team contributing to the victory of PAOK 3–2. He was voted Greek Footballer of the Year in 2014, and on 4 February 2015, he scored his second goal against OFI under Gennaro Gattuso. On 18 March, he scored the winning goal against Ergotelis in a 1–0 win. While 21 March marked his fourth goal against Panathinaikos away, 5 April marked his two goals for his team's victory 2–1 against Xanthi. On 3 May 2015, he scored another goal contributing to a 1–0 win against Levadiakos, his former team. Papadopoulos, after PAOK, was close to making a sensational move to Karşıyaka after agreeing to sign a one-year deal, but the deal was not fulfilled due to financial reasons. On 28 August 2015, Papadopoulos turned down an offer of a year-long contract from Super League club AEL Kalloni, waiting for a better offer.

=== Asteras Tripolis ===
On 8 September 2015, Papadopoulos signed a year-long contract with Asteras Tripolis for an undisclosed fee. He made his debut in the Super League with his new team against AEL Kalloni. On 18 October 2015, in his first match in the 2015-16 season as a member of the starting XI, he missed a penalty in a 1–1 home draw against Skoda Xanthi as the ball hit the crossbar. On 8 November, he scored his first goal with the new team, giving them a victory away against AEK Athens. On 20 January 2016, he dissolved his contract with the club by mutual consent.

=== Second spell in Atromitos ===
On 21 January 2016, Papadopoulos signed a contract with his former team, Atromitos until the summer of 2017, for an undisclosed fee. He made his debut in the Super League 24 January against PAS Giannina. On 10 February 2016, he reached the semifinals of the Greek Cup, against his ex-club Panathinaikos. On 28 November 2016, he scored his first goal with the club, in a triumphal 4–3 away win against PAOK.

=== Panetolikos ===
On 1 February 2017, Papadopoulos signed a six-month contract with Panetolikos. At that very day, he had his first training session with his new team. He made his debut 4 February 2017 against his previews team Atromitos. On 4 March 2017, scored his first goal with his new team against Levadiakos, his ex-club.

=== Retirement ===
On 23 September 2017, Papadopoulos officially announced his retirement from professional football.

== International career ==
Dimitrios Papadopoulos made his debut in the Greece national team on 20 November 2002 against Republic of Ireland and he was included in the squad of Euro 2004 that would go on to be tournament champions. His pass for the goal of Zisis Vryzas allowed Greece to qualify from the group stage at the expense of Russia and Spain and then become Euro 2004 Champions. He also participated in all three games of Greece Olympic football team in the 2004 Summer Olympics scoring 1 goal. As Euro 2004 winner, Dimitrios Papadopoulos was included in the Greek squad for the 2005 FIFA Confederations Cup in Germany. Otto Rehhagel also included him in the squad during qualification but he did not make it to the final selection for UEFA Euro 2008 in Switzerland and Austria.

On 29 August 2013, the coach of the Greece national team, Fernando Santos announced the return of Dimitrios Papadopoulos after six years absence for the match against Liechtenstein in Vaduz at the Rheinpark Stadion stadium for the 2014 FIFA World Cup qualification. He came in during the 84th minute replacing Lazaros Christodoulopoulos.

== Honours ==
Individual

- Alpha Ethniki/Super League Greece Greek Footballer of the Season: 2003–04, 2012–13, 2013–14
- Super League Greece Team of the Season: 2013–14
