= Filippos Darlas =

Greek footballer (born 1983)

Personal information
- Date of birth: 23 October 1983 (age 43)
- Place of birth: Kenourgio, Greece
- Height: 1.82 m (6 ft 0 in)
- Position: Left-back

Senior career*
Years	Team	Apps	(Gls)
1999–2001	Panetolikos	22	(1)
2001–2010	Panathinaikos	27	(0)
2002	→ Kallithea (loan)	0	(0)
2002–2004	→ Marko (loan)	42	(4)
2004–2005	→ Apollon Smyrnis (loan)	20	(3)
2008–2009	→ PAOK (loan)	14	(0)
2010–2011	Brest	3	(0)
2011	→ Atromitos (loan)	6	(0)
2012	Ergotelis	7	(0)
2012–2014	Panetolikos	22	(0)
2014	Aris	0	(0)
2015	Kissamikos		
2016	Apollon Dokimiou		
2016-17	PAO Doxa Kenourgiou		

International career^{‡}
2003–2005	Greece U21	14	(1)
2006	Greece	1	(0)
- * Club domestic league appearances and goals as of 19:25, 9 December 2013 (UTC) ‡ National team caps and goals as of 08:21, 1 July 2012 (UTC)

Filippos Darlas (Greek: Φίλιππος Δάρλας; born 23 October 1983) is a retired Greek professional footballer who played as a left-back.

== Club career ==
=== Super League Greece ===
Born in Kenourgio, Greece, Darlas began his professional career 1999 in Panetolikos. In the 2001–02 season Darlas was transferred to Panathinaikos Athens but due to his relative young age (just 19 years old) he was sent on loan to the first Greek division team Kalithea and for the two following years to Markopoulo-based Third Division side F.C. Marko. In the 2004–05 season Darlas went to Apollon Smyrnis before returning to Panathinaikos and made his Champions League debut against Werder Bremen and FC Barcelona. During the transfer period in 2008 he moved to PAOK as an exchange to the transfer of Christos Melissis.

=== Brest ===
On 28 June 2010, Darlas signed for French club Stade Brestois 29 for one year with an option for a second. In January 2011, he joined Atromitos F.C. on loan. In January 2012 he joined Ergotelis F.C.

On 18 July 2012, Darlas returned to Greece and former club Panetolikos, signing a one-year contract.

== International career ==
Darlas was a main stay in the Under 21s making 14 consecutive appearances. In 2006, national coach Otto Rehhagel called him to wear his national team shirt for his first and only cap.

== Honours ==
Panathinaikos

- Super League Greece: 2009–10
- Greek Football Cup: 2009–10
