= Anthony Šerić =

Croatian Australian footballer

Ante Šerić
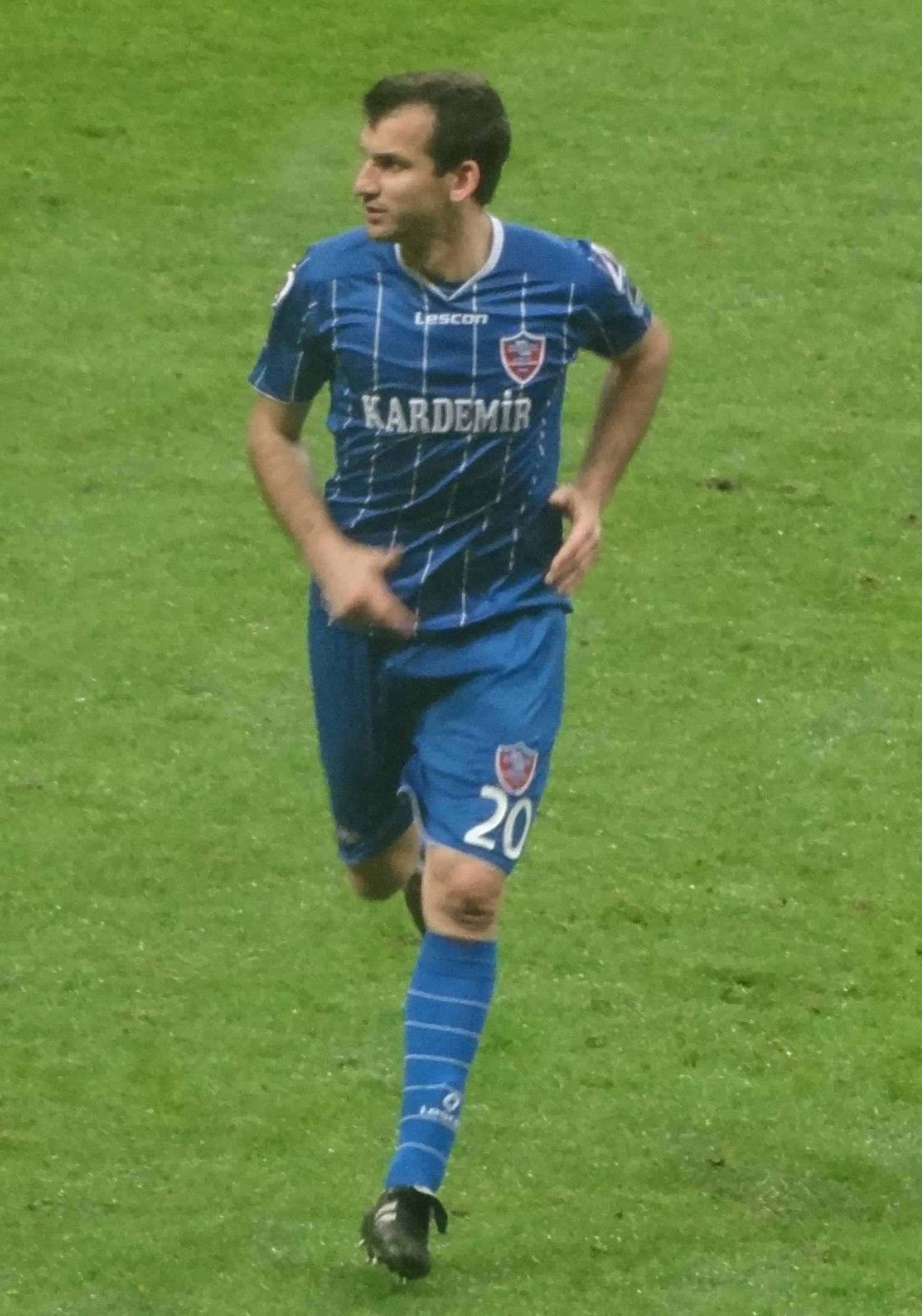
- Šerić in 2012

Personal information
- Date of birth: 15 January 1979 (age 47)
- Place of birth: Sydney, Australia
- Height: 1.81 m (5 ft 11 in)
- Position: Left-back

Youth career
- AIS Canberra
- Sydney United

Senior career*
| Years | Team | Apps | (Gls) |
| 1997–1999 | Hajduk Split | 33 | (0) |
| 1999–2001 | Parma | 0 | (0) |
| 1999–2001 | → Verona (loan) | 22 | (1) |
| 2001–2005 | Verona | 25 | (0) |
| 2002–2003 | → Brescia (loan) | 30 | (1) |
| 2003–2004 | → Parma (loan) | 17 | (0) |
| 2004–2005 | → Lazio (loan) | 17 | (0) |
| 2005–2008 | Panathinaikos | 50 | (1) |
| 2008–2009 | Beşiktaş | 3 | (0) |
| 2009–2010 | Hajduk Split | 22 | (1) |
| 2010–2013 | Karabükspor | 87 | (1) |
| 2013–2014 | Olhanense | 4 | (0) |
| Total | | 310 | (5) |

International career^{‡}
| 1999 | Croatia U20 | 4 | (0) |
| 1998–2001 | Croatia U21 | 17 | (2) |
| 1998–2006 | Croatia | 16 | (0) |
Medal record
Competitor for Croatia
| Bronze medal – third place | FIFA World Cup | 1998 |
- * Club domestic league appearances and goals as of 23:28, 24 May 2011 (UTC) ‡ National team caps and goals as of 23:28, 6 September 2006 (UTC)

Anthony Šerić (Croatian pronunciation: [ˈʃɛːrit͡ɕ]; born 15 January 1979) is a Croatian Australian former footballer who played as a left-back. He was a part of the Croatia national team at the 1998, 2002 and 2006 FIFA World Cups.

== Early life ==
Šerić was born to a Croatian family in Sydney, Australia, and received a football scholarship to the Australian Institute of Sport.

== Club career ==
=== Hajduk ===
Šerić began his professional football career in Split, Croatia, where he played for Hajduk Split.

=== Verona & Parma ===
Šerić then moved to Italy to play in Serie A, initially with Parma. But due to 3+2 non-EU quota, he was loaned to Verona and Adaílton was also signed by Verona from Parma in co-ownership deal.

In 2000, his loan was extended. The quota abolished during the 2000–01 season but Šerić did not earn a return to Parma. In June 2001, team-mate Martin Laursen was bought outright by Parma (Parma already bought half in 2000) and Šerić now co-owned by Verona and Parma, for 2.5 billion lire (€1,291,142). Later team-mate striker Alberto Gilardino also bought by Parma in co-ownership deal but loaned back to Verona.

Verona were relegated to Serie B in 2002. In June 2002, Šerić was bought outright by Verona, and Gilardino was bought in full by Parma. Šerić did not stay in Serie B, and was loaned Serie A side Brescia.

In the 2003–04 season, he rejoined his former Verona coach (in 1999-2000 season) Cesare Prandelli at Parma, while Florian Myrtaj moved to opposite direction.

In 2004–05 season, he left for Lazio as the club has lost Jaap Stam, Siniša Mihajlović, Giuseppe Favalli and only Fernando Couto, Paolo Negro, Massimo Oddo remained. Lazio also signed defender Sebastiano Siviglia and Óscar López.

=== Panathinaikos ===
In 2005, Šerić left for Panathinaikos to re-join Alberto Malesani his who also was his coach at Verona (2001–02 season).

=== Hajduk Split ===
In June 2008 he moved to the Turkish side Beşiktaş on a free transfer closely followed by a move back to his original side Hajduk Split in January 2009. He was a crucial member of Hajduk's defence playing 11 league games until the end of the 2008–2009 season.

=== Olhanense ===
After leaving Karabükspor in the summer of 2013, Šerić signed a one-year contract with Portuguese side S.C. Olhanense. His Olhanense debut came on 25 November 2013 in a League game against Académica de Coimbra in which his side lost 1–0.

On 15 March 2014, Šerić was released from his contract with Olhanense by mutual consent, and subsequently retired from professional football. He had played 4 games in all competitions without scoring.

== International career ==
In 1998, Šerić was infamously picked for both Australia and Croatia.

He opted to play for Croatia, and his decision immediately paid dividends as the nation finished 3rd at the 1998 FIFA World Cup in France. He did not receive any playing time during the tournament, prior to which he made his full international debut as a substitute in a friendly match against Slovakia on 29 May 1998 in Pula. He also featured as a substitute in Croatia's following two pre-tournament friendlies.

After the 1998 FIFA World Cup, Šerić went on to become a regular with the Croatian under-21 team, winning a total of 17 international caps and scoring two goals over the following three years. He appeared in all of the team's three matches at the 2000 UEFA European Under-21 Championship in Slovakia, where they were eliminated in the group stage. He scored the opening goal in their final group match, a 4–3 defeat to the Czech Republic. He also made four appearances in the qualifying for the tournament, scoring a goal in a 6–2 win at Yugoslavia in August 1999. The same year, he featured in all of the Croatian under-20 team's four matches at the 1999 FIFA World Youth Championship in Nigeria, where they exited the tournament in the round of 16. He finished his career with the Croatian under-21 team in November 2001, when they failed to qualify for the 2002 UEFA European Under-21 Championship after losing to the Czech Republic on away goals in the play-offs. He made a total of seven appearances in the qualifying campaign, including both play-off matches.

Šerić continued to feature sporadically for the Croatian senior national team until 2006, also being a non-playing squad member at the 2002 and 2006 FIFA World Cups. Hence, he never featured in any of the 13 matches in all World Cup tournaments. In the qualifying for the 2006 World Cup, he made his first two competitive international appearances at senior level, both as a starter. His final international appearance came on 6 September 2006, when he played the full 90 minutes in Croatia's opening UEFA Euro 2008 qualifier, a goalless draw at Russia. He won a total of 16 full international caps.

== Honours ==
Hajduk Split

- Croatian Cup: 2009–10

Beşiktaş

- Süper Lig: 2008–09
- Turkish Cup: 2008–09
