= Pierre Ebéde =

Cameroonian footballer

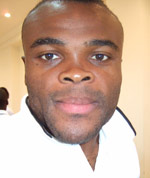
- Ebéde in 2006

Personal information
- Full name: Pierre Romain Owono Ebéde
- Date of birth: 9 February 1980 (age 46)
- Place of birth: Yaoundé, Cameroon
- Height: 1.88 m (6 ft 2 in)
- Position: Goalkeeper

Senior career*
Years	Team	Apps	(Gls)
1997–1998	Tonnerre Yaoundé	0	(0)
1999–2002	Apollon Kalamarias	64	(0)
2002–2005	Chalkidona	67	(0)
2005–2007	Panathinaikos	22	(0)
2007–2008	Metz	1	(0)
2008–2010	AEL Limassol	10	(0)
2010–2011	Astra Ploieşti	6	(0)
2012–2021	Haguenau	147+ (Note: Statistics are missing for the 2012–13 and 2013–14 seasons.)	(0+)
Total		317+	(0+)

International career
2006	Cameroon	1	(0)
- * Club domestic league appearances and goals

Pierre Romain Owono Ebéde (born 9 February 1980) is a Cameroonian former professional footballer who played as a goalkeeper. He made one appearance for the Cameroon national team.

== Club career ==
Ebéde went to Greece during the 1998 summer transfer window to play for Apollon Kalamarias. He stayed there until January 2002, when Chalkidona (a now non-existent team that was later merged with Atromitos) bought him for €46,500.

His good performances led Greek Super League club Panathinaikos to acquire him in 2005. Known for his very good reflexes, he quickly became a favorite among the team's fans.

During his first season with the Greens, Ebede saw all 30 Alpha Ethniki games from the bench, behind starting goalkeeper Croatian Mario Galinovic. His second season was much better, being in the starting line up of Panathinaikos in 22 games.

However, Ebéde was dismissed from Panathinaikos on 31 May 2007 and later joined Metz. After his spell in France, he signed a contract with AEL Limassol on 4 June 2008.

In July 2020, it was reported Ebéde would remain with Haguenau.
