= Sotiris Leontiou =

Greek footballer

Personal information
- Full name: Sotirios Leontiou
- Date of birth: 17 July 1984 (age 42)
- Place of birth: Ioannina, Greece
- Height: 1.82 m (5 ft 11 1/2 in)
- Positions: Defensive midfielder; centre midfielder; left back

Team information
- Current team: P.O. Psychikou

Youth career
- Panathinaikos

Senior career*
Years	Team	Apps	(Gls)
2002–2012	Panathinaikos	37	(0)
2002–2004	→ Marko (loan)	39	(11)
2004–2005	→ Proodeftiki (loan)	26	(2)
2009–2010	→ Kavala (loan)	3	(0)
2010–2011	→ Ilioupoli (loan)	28	(2)
2012–2013	Apollon Smyrnis	15	(0)
2013–2014	Fostiras	18	(0)
2014–2016	Thesprotos	?	(?)
2016	Egaleo	3	(0)
2016–2022	P.O. Psychikou	118	(32)

International career
2003–2006	Greece U21	14	

Managerial career
- 2013: P.O. Psychikou(youth)
- * Club domestic league appearances and goals as of 1 June 2014

Sotiris Leontiou (Greek: Σωτήρης Λεοντίου, born 17 July 1984) is a retired Greek footballer who coaches for P.O. Psychikou academies. He played as defensive midfielder or as a left full back.

== Career ==
He started his playing career when he was a teenager in the Panathinaikos Academies. After spending some years in Panathinaikos as an amateur he was finally given a chance to prove his worth as he was given on loan to GS Marko of Markopoulo for 2 seasons (2001–2003). While playing for FC Marko he played a total of 38 league matches and scored 11 goals. In the 04/05 season he was given again on loan, this time in Proodeftiki FC and played 26 matches and scored 2 goals.

At the beginning of the 05/06 season, he returned to Panathinaikos first team where he signed a new 5-year contract and became an integral part of the team in the Super League Greece.

Unfortunately his promising career stopped dramatically in the first day of the 2007–08 season in a derby against Olympiacos when a torn ligament injury sidelined him for two full seasons. The knee was damaged (torn posterior cruciate ligament, lateral collateral ligament rupture, ruptured popliteal tendon, torn posterior bursa and torn medical and lateral meniscus of the left knee) and was described by experts as the most serious injury in the recent years. He returned in training around January 2009 but he failed to appear in any games.

At his 1-year loan spell in Kavala in 09–10, he managed to earn his first cap against PAOK, playing for 9 minutes. He returned at the end of the 09/10 season on the Panathinaikos roster and was again loaned at Ilioupoli F.C. for the 2010–2011 season. For the next two seasons, he played for Football League clubs Apollon Smyrnis and Fostiras. In the 2012–13 season, playing for Apollon Smyrnis he managed to win the Football League championship.

On 15 September 2014, Thesprotos announced the player for a year contract. On 4 February 2016, he signed a year contract with Egaleo. On 22 July 2016, playing only 152' with the club, he solved his contract.

== Honours ==
Panathinaikos

- Super League Greece: 2009–10
- Greek Cup: 2009–10
