= Mario Galinović =

Croatian footballer (born 1976)

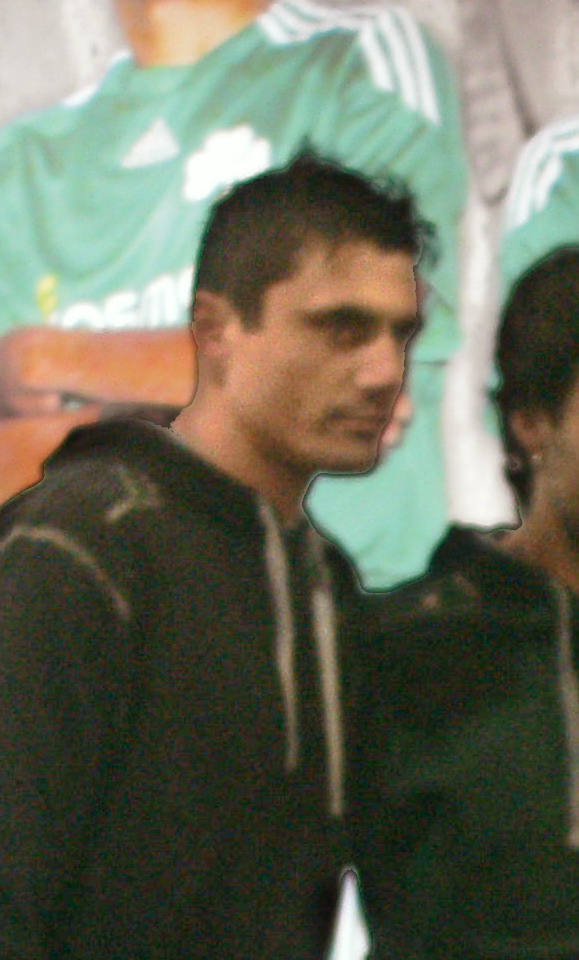
- Galinović in 2009

Personal information
- Date of birth: 15 November 1976 (age 49)
- Place of birth: Osijek, SFR Yugoslavia
- Height: 1.95 m (6 ft 5 in)
- Position: Goalkeeper

Team information
- Current team: Cardiff City (goalkeeping coach)

Youth career
- 1990–1993: Osijek

Senior career*
| Years | Team | Apps | (Gls) |
| 1993–2002 | Osijek | 39 | (0) |
| 2002–2004 | Kamen Ingrad | 64 | (0) |
| 2004–2011 | Panathinaikos | 118 | (0) |
| 2010–2011 | → Kavala (loan) | 27 | (0) |
| 2011–2012 | Kerkyra | 25 | (0) |
| Total | | 261 | (0) |

International career
| 1999–2007 | Croatia | 12 | (0) |

Managerial career
- 2015–2017: Panathinaikos (goalkeeper coach)
- 2017–2020: Sparta Prague (goalkeeper coach)
- 2020–2021: PAOK (goalkeeper coach)
- 2021–2023: Gaziantep (goalkeeper coach)
- 2023–2024: Cardiff City (goalkeeper coach)
- * Club domestic league appearances and goals

Mario Galinović (born 15 November 1976) is a former Croatian footballer who played as a goalkeeper. He is currently goalkeeping coach at Cardiff City.

Galinović played most of his 19-year career in Croatia and Greece.

== Club career ==
=== NK Osijek ===
Galinović started his professional career with Croatian First League side NK Osijek, where he was part of the first team from 1993 until 2002. With the club, he also played in the UEFA Cup in 1998 and 1999, and won the Croatian Cup in 1999. In 2002, he moved to another Croatian First League side, NK Kamen Ingrad, and spent two seasons with the club as their first-choice goalkeeper. While at Kamen Ingrad, he also played in both of the club's two UEFA Cup matches against famous German club FC Schalke 04 in 2003, where they narrowly lost 1–0 on aggregate, conceding the only goal 14 minutes before the end of the second leg played in Gelsenkirchen.

=== Panathinaikos ===
He moved to Panathinaikos on a free transfer in July 2004. With the team, he also managed to make his UEFA Champions League debut, against Rosenborg BK in September 2004, subsequently making another appearance in the competition that season and also playing in both of the club's third-round UEFA Cup matches against FC Sevilla in February 2005, where they lost 2–1 on aggregate. He was then the club's first-choice goalkeeper in the 2005–06 UEFA Champions League season and appeared in all of their six group matches before they exited the competition in the first round. Galinović made his first appearance in UEFA Champions League against Rosenborg BK, on 14 September 2004.

In 20 appearances, he managed to keep a clean sheet seven times; most importantly, those matches with FC Barcelona and Inter Milan. He also managed to keep a clean sheet for three matches in a row.

=== AO Kavala ===
In summer 2010 Galinović moved to Kavala in Super League Greece.

=== AO Kerkyra ===
In August 2011 Galinović signed a contract for one year with Kerkyra, a Greek Superleague based on the island of Corfu.

== International career ==
Galinović made his international debut for the Croatia national team on 13 June 1999 in a friendly match against Egypt at the Korea Cup tournament in Seoul. He was subsequently not part of the national team for several years.

However, when Slaven Bilić was appointed head coach at the Croatia national team in the summer of 2006, Galinović made his international comeback as he was called up to be part of the team during the UEFA Euro 2008 qualifiers. He mostly served as the team's third-choice goalkeeper, behind Stipe Pletikosa and Vedran Runje, making no appearances during the qualifying campaign. He did, however, won his second international cap in a friendly match against Slovakia in October 2007, replacing Runje at half-time. Croatia won the game 3–0. This would be Galinović's final appearance for the national team.

Galinović was also a member of Croatia's 23-man squad at the UEFA Euro 2008 finals in Austria and Switzerland, but did not make any appearances as Pletikosa appeared in three and Runje in one of the team's four matches at the tournament. He was the only member of the Croatian squad not to feature during the tournament.

== Coaching career ==
In June 2023, Galinović was appointed goalkeeping coach at Championship club Cardiff City.

== Career statistics ==
=== International ===
Croatia national team
| Year | Apps | Goals |
|---|---|---|
| 1999 | 1 | 0 |
| 2007 | 1 | 0 |
| Total | 2 | 0 |

== Honours ==
Osijek

- Croatian Cup: 1999

Panathinaikos

- Super League Greece: 2009–2010
- Greek Football Cup: 2010
