= 1999–2000 Panathinaikos F.C. season =

Panathinaikos
1999–2000 season
- Chairman: Yiorgos Vardinogiannis
- Manager: Giannis Kyrastas
- Ground: Olympic Stadium
- Alpha Ethniki: 2nd
- Greek Cup: Round of 16
- UEFA Cup: Round of 16
- Top goalscorer: League: Nikos Liberopoulos (23); All: Nikos Liberopoulos(25)
Home colours	Away colours

In the 1999–00 season Panathinaikos played for 41st consecutive time in Greece's top division, the Alpha Ethniki. They also competed in the UEFA Cup and the Greek Cup.

== Players ==
=== First-team squad ===
Squad at end of season

Note: Flags indicate national team as defined under FIFA eligibility rules; some limited exceptions apply. Players may hold more than one non-FIFA nationality.

No.	Pos.	Nation	Player
1	GK	GRE	Antonis Nikopolidis
2	DF	DEN	René Henriksen
3	DF	PER	Percy Olivares
4	DF	GRE	Georgios Alexopoulos
5	DF	YUG	Vladan Milojević
6	MF	ARG	Fernando Galetto
7	MF	CRO	Aljoša Asanović
8	DF	GRE	Giannis Goumas
9	FW	POL	Krzysztof Warzycha
10	MF	GER	Karlheinz Pflipsen
11	FW	ISL	Helgi Sigurðsson
12	MF	NOR	Erik Mykland
13	FW	POL	Igor Sypniewski

No.	Pos.	Nation	Player
14	DF	GRE	Leonidas Vokolos
15	MF	GRE	Angelos Basinas
16	FW	GRE	Konstantinos Ipirotis
17	FW	GRE	Georgios Nasiopoulos
19	MF	ALB	Bledar Kola
21	FW	GRE	Nikos Liberopoulos
22	GK	GRE	Konstantinos Chalkias
23	MF	GRE	Kostas Kiassos
25	GK	GRE	Stefanos Kotsolis
26	DF	GRE	Giorgos Simos
28	MF	GRE	Giorgos Karagounis
30	DF	GRE	Takis Fyssas
32	FW	GER	Marco Villa

== Competitions ==
=== Alpha Ethniki ===
==== League table ====
Pos	Team	Pld	W	D	L	GF	GA	GD	Pts	Qualification or relegation
1	Olympiacos (C)	34	30	2	2	86	18	+68	92	Qualification for Champions League first group stage
2	Panathinaikos	34	28	4	2	92	24	+68	88	Qualification for Champions League third qualifying round
3	AEK Athens	34	20	6	8	69	39	+30	66	Qualification for UEFA Cup first round
4	OFI	34	18	9	7	60	44	+16	63	Qualification for UEFA Cup first round
5	PAOK	34	15	10	9	64	44	+20	55	Qualification for UEFA Cup first round

Source: Galanis Sports Data
Rules for classification: 1) Points; 2) Head-to-head points; 3) Head-to-head goal difference; 4) Goal difference; 5) Goals scored; 6) Goals against; 7) Play-offs (neutral ground); 8) Draw.
(Note: Criterion 7 is only used if needed to decide champion, teams for relegation or teams for UEFA competitions).
(C) Champions

==== Matches ====
20 September 1999 1	Panathinaikos	2–0	Trikala	Marousi
	Pflipsen 60' (pen.); Goumas 66'			Stadium: Olympic Stadium

26 September 1999 2	AEK Athens	1–2	Panathinaikos	Piraeus
	Zikos 45'		Pflipsen 42'; Asanović 78'	Stadium: Karaiskakis Stadium

3 October 1999 3	Panathinaikos	1–1	PAOK	Marousi
	Goumas 56'		Nagbe 79'	Stadium: Olympic Stadium

17 October 1999 4	Panathinaikos	5–0	Kalamata	Marousi
	Sypniewski 8'; Liberopoulos 28', 69'; Sigurðsson 36'; Pflipsen 67'			Stadium: Olympic Stadium

25 October 1999 5	Ethnikos Asteras	1–2	Panathinaikos	Kaisariani
	Svitlica 88'		Goumas 32', 89'	Stadium: Michalis Kritikopoulos Stadium

31 October 1999 6	Panathinaikos	3–0	Iraklis	Marousi
	Pflipsen 56'; Sypniewski 57'; Warzycha 81'			Stadium: Olympic Stadium

8 November 1999 7	Paniliakos	0–1	Panathinaikos	Pyrgos
			Warzycha 49'	Stadium: Pyrgos Stadium

21 November 1999 8	Panathinaikos	2–0	Olympiacos	Marousi
	Olivares 59'; Warzycha 64'			Stadium: Olympic Stadium

29 November 1999 9	Ionikos	2–2	Panathinaikos	Piraeus
	Brewster 10'; Ofrydopoulos 44'		Pflipsen 42'; Asanović 89'	Stadium: Neapoli Stadium

5 December 1999 10	Panathinaikos	3–0	Aris	Marousi
	Liberopoulos 31'; Kola 39'; Pflipsen 44'			Stadium: Olympic Stadium

13 December 1999 11	OFI	3–4	Panathinaikos	Heraklion
	Gómez 34', 49'; Nioplias 53'		Pavlopoulos 3' (o.g.); Liberopoulos 22', 86'; Sigurðsson 44'	Stadium: Theodoros Vardinogiannis Stadium

23 December 1999 12	Skoda Xanthi	1–3	Panathinaikos	Xanthi
	Kyparissis 1'		Liberopoulos 21'; Karagounis 57'; Kola 69'	Stadium: A.O. Xanthi Stadium

29 December 1999 13	Panathinaikos	7–1	Panachaiki	Marousi
	Goumas 39'; Sigurðsson 46', 89'; Liberopoulos 48'; Kola 58'; Asanović 69'; Karagounis 80'		Jovanović 15'	Stadium: Olympic Stadium

8 January 2000 14	Proodeftiki	1–0	Panathinaikos	Piraeus
	Kazantzis 55'			Stadium: Korydallos Municipal Stadium

17 January 2000 15	Panathinaikos	2–1	Panionios	Marousi
	Mykland 1'; Nasiopoulos 11'		Nalitzis 38'	Stadium: Olympic Stadium

22 January 2000 16	Apollon Athens	0–3	Panathinaikos	Rizoupoli
			Asanović 31'; Karagounis 42'; Nasiopoulos 57'	Stadium: Rizoupoli Stadium

30 January 2000 17	Panathinaikos	3–0	Kavala	Marousi
	Karagounis 14'; Vokolos 56'; Sigurðsson 58'			Stadium: Olympic Stadium

6 February 2000 18	Trikala	1–3	Panathinaikos	Trikala
	Chloros 16'		Vokolos 9'; Liberopoulos 40', 82'	Stadium: Trikala Municipal Stadium

13 February 2000 19	Panathinaikos	1–0	AEK Athens	Marousi
	Kola 90+2'			Stadium: Olympic Stadium

20 February 2000 20	PAOK	1–3	Panathinaikos	Thessaloniki
	Bratić 74'		Basinas 30' (pen.); Karagounis 33'; Warzycha 69'	Stadium: Toumba Stadium

28 February 2000 21	Kalamata	0–0	Panathinaikos	Kalamata
				Stadium: Kalamata Municipal Stadium

5 March 2000 22	Panathinaikos	4–0	Ethnikos Asteras	Marousi
	Basinas 6' (pen.); Nasiopoulos 12'; Kola 64'; Sigurðsson 83'			Stadium: Olympic Stadium

12 March 2000 23	Iraklis	1–3	Panathinaikos	Thessaloniki
	Konstantinou 8' (pen.)		Basinas 20' (pen.); Karagounis 63'; Warzycha 71'	Stadium: Kaftanzoglio Stadium

19 March 2000 24	Panathinaikos	3–1	Paniliakos	Marousi
	Nasiopoulos 3'; Karagounis 41'; Sigurðsson 43'		Ziakas 67'	Stadium: Olympic Stadium

26 March 2000 25	Olympiacos	2–2	Panathinaikos	Marousi
	Anatolakis 9'; Alexandris 81'		Galetto 22'; Liberopoulos 80'	Stadium: Olympic Stadium

2 April 2000 26	Panathinaikos	5–0	Ionikos	Marousi
	Karagounis 24', 44'; Liberopoulos 41', 89'; Kiassos 50'			Stadium: Olympic Stadium

12 April 2000 27	Aris	0–2	Panathinaikos	Thessaloniki
			Warzycha 60'; Liberopoulos 79'	Stadium: Kleanthis Vikelidis Stadium

17 April 2000 28	Panathinaikos	3–2	OFI	Marousi
	Warzycha 20', 38'; Sigurðsson 90'		Marinakis 42'; Kotsios 76'	Stadium: Olympic Stadium

22 April 2000 29	Panathinaikos	2–1	Skoda Xanthi	Marousi
	Basinas 34'; Goumas 90+3'		Patsatzoglou 18'	Stadium: Olympic Stadium

3 May 2000 30	Panachaiki	1–0	Panathinaikos	Patras
	Katsouranis 61'			Stadium: Kostas Davourlis Stadium

8 May 2000 31	Panathinaikos	3–1	Proodeftiki	Marousi
	Kola 16'; Liberopoulos 65', 73'		Bayazid 84'	Stadium: Olympic Stadium

14 May 2000 32	Panionios	0–4	Panathinaikos	Nea Smyrni
			Liberopoulos 14', 36'; Nasiopoulos 25'; Olivares 67'	Stadium: Nea Smyrni Stadium

21 May 2000 33	Panathinaikos	5–0	Apollon Athens	Marousi
	Warzycha 25'; Liberopoulos 40', 44', 71', 89'			Stadium: Olympic Stadium

28 May 2000 34	Kavala	1–4	Panathinaikos	Kavala
	Pisz 77'		Vokolos 42'; Liberopoulos 67', 82'; Goumas 81'	Stadium: Kavala National Stadium

=== Greek Cup ===
==== Group 1 ====
Pos	Team	Pld	W	D	L	GF	GA	GD	Pts	Qualification	PAO	ION	LEO	PNT	KER	IAL
1	Panathinaikos	5	5	0	0	18	1	+17	15	Round of 16		1–0	4–0	5–1	—	—
2	Ionikos	5	3	0	2	13	5	+8	9	Additional Round	—		—	3–0	3–2	6–0
3	Leonidio	5	3	0	2	6	6	0	9		—	2–1		—	1–0	3–0
4	Panetolikos	5	3	0	2	6	8	−2	9		—	—	1–0		2–0	—
5	Keratsini	5	1	0	4	5	10	−5	3		0–3	—	—	—		3–1
6	Ialysos	5	0	0	5	1	19	−18	0		0–5	—	—	0–2	—	

Source: epo.gr

===== Matches =====
12 August 1999 1	Panathinaikos	4–0	Leonidio	Ampelokipoi
	Liberopoulos 24', 31'; Sypniewski 44'; Kola 83'	Report (page 1)		Stadium: Leoforos Alexandras Stadium

22 August 1999 2	Ialysos	0–5	Panathinaikos	Ialysos
		Report (page 1)	Olivares 43'; Sigurðsson 70' (pen.), 88'; Mykland 86'; Ipirotis 90'	Stadium: Municipal Stadium Ekonomideio

25 August 1999 3	Panathinaikos	1–0	Ionikos	Ampelokipoi
	Liberopoulos 42'	Report (page 2)		Stadium: Leoforos Alexandras Stadium

28 August 1999 4	Keratsini	0–3	Panathinaikos	Keratsini
		Report (page 3)	Sypniewski 67'; Karagounis 70'; Fyssas 89'	Stadium: Municipal Stadium of Keratsini

7 October 1999 5	Panathinaikos	5–1	Panetolikos	Ampelokipoi
	Sypniewski 23'; Pflipsen 28', 70'; Nasiopoulos 74'; Kiassos 83'	Report (page 3)	Andreadakis 32'	Stadium: Leoforos Alexandras Stadium

==== Round of 16 ====
13 January 2000 Round of 16	Aris	1–1 (a.e.t.) (4–2 p)	Panathinaikos	Thessaloniki
17:30 EET	Andrioli 53'	Report (page 32)	Karagounis 42'	Stadium: Aris Stadium
	Penalties
	Papadopoulos (penalty scored); Charisteas (penalty scored); Katsiaros (penalty missed); Kyzeridis (penalty scored); Mantzios (penalty scored)		(penalty missed) Karagounis; (penalty scored) Vokolos; (penalty scored) Sigurðsson; (penalty missed) Olivares

=== UEFA Cup ===
==== First round ====
16 September 1999 First leg	Gorica (Slovenia)	0–1	(Greece) Panathinaikos	Nova Gorica, Slovenia
16:00		Report	Liberopoulos 14'	Stadium: Sports Park; Attendance: 1,500; Referee: Eyal Zur (Israel)

30 September 1999 Second leg	Panathinaikos (Greece)	2–0 (3–0 agg.)	(Slovenia) Gorica	Athens, Greece
20:15	Sigurðsson 38'; Nasiopoulos 69'	Report		Stadium: Olympic Stadium; Attendance: 6,280; Referee: Wolfgang Stark (Germany)

==== Second round ====
21 October 1999 First leg	Grazer AK (Austria)	2–1	(Greece) Panathinaikos	Graz, Austria
20:30	Lipa 57'; Pamić 80'	Report	Sypniewski 64'	Stadium: Arnold Schwarzenegger Stadium; Attendance: 5,214; Referee: Alan Snoddy (Northern Ireland)

4 November 1999 Second leg	Panathinaikos (Greece)	1–0 (2a–2 agg.)	(Austria) Grazer AK	Athens, Greece
20:00	Pflipsen 90' (pen.)	Report		Stadium: Olympic Stadium; Attendance: 15,000; Referee: Vladimír Hriňák (Slovakia)

==== Third round ====
25 November 1999 First leg	Deportivo La Coruña (Spain)	4–2	(Greece) Panathinaikos	A Coruña, Spain
21:00	Olivares 7' (o.g.); Pauleta 11'; Djalminha 13'; Donato 30'	Report	Warzycha 29'; Galetto 66'	Stadium: Estadio Riazor; Attendance: 25,000; Referee: Terje Hauge (Norway)

9 December 1999 Second leg	Panathinaikos (Greece)	1–1 (3–5 agg.)	(Spain) Deportivo La Coruña	Athens, Greece
19:30	Asanović 78' (pen.)	Report	Makaay 90'	Stadium: Olympic Stadium; Attendance: 37,000; Referee: Alain Sars (France)
