= 2000–01 Panathinaikos F.C. season =

Panathinaikos
2000–01 season
- Owner: Giannis Vardinogiannis
- Chairman: Angelos Filippidis
- Manager: Giannis Kyrastas
- Ground: Leoforos Alexandras Stadium
- Alpha Ethniki: 2nd
- Greek Cup: Quarter-finals
- Champions League: Round of 16
- Top goalscorer: League: Krzysztof Warzycha (13); All: Krzysztof Warzycha (19)
Home colours	Away colours	Third colours

In the 2000–01 season Panathinaikos played for 42nd consecutive time in Greece's top division, Alpha Ethniki. They also competed in the UEFA Champions League and the Greek Cup.

== Players ==
=== First-team squad ===
Squad at end of season

Note: Flags indicate national team as defined under FIFA eligibility rules; some limited exceptions apply. Players may hold more than one non-FIFA nationality.

No.	Pos.	Nation	Player
1	GK	GRE	Antonis Nikopolidis
2	DF	DEN	René Henriksen
3	DF	PER	Percy Olivares
4	DF	GRE	Georgios Alexopoulos
5	MF	ARG	Fernando Galetto
6	MF	POR	Paulo Sousa
7	FW	CRO	Goran Vlaović
8	DF	GRE	Giannis Goumas
9	FW	POL	Krzysztof Warzycha
10	MF	GER	Karlheinz Pflipsen
11	FW	ISL	Helgi Sigurðsson
12	GK	GRE	Stefanos Kotsolis
13	FW	POL	Igor Sypniewski
14	DF	GRE	Leonidas Vokolos
15	DF	CRO	Daniel Šarić
16	DF	GRE	Giourkas Seitaridis

No.	Pos.	Nation	Player
17	FW	GRE	Giorgos Nasiopoulos
18	MF	GRE	Vaggelis Koutsoures
19	MF	ALB	Bledar Kola
20	MF	GRE	Angelos Basinas
21	FW	GRE	Nikos Liberopoulos
22	GK	GRE	Kostas Chalkias
23	FW	POL	Emmanuel Olisadebe
24	MF	GHA	Derek Boateng
25	MF	GRE	Konstantinos Daskalakis
26	MF	GRE	Giorgos Karagounis
27	DF	GRE	Andreas Koutelieris
28	DF	GRE	Giorgos Simos
29	FW	GRE	Christos Delmekouras
30	DF	GRE	Takis Fyssas
31	MF	GRE	Kostas Kiassos

== Competitions ==
=== Alpha Ethniki ===
==== League table ====
Pos	Team	Pld	W	D	L	GF	GA	GD	Pts	Qualification or relegation
1	Olympiacos (C)	30	25	3	2	84	22	+62	78	Qualification for Champions League first group stage
2	Panathinaikos	30	20	6	4	61	20	+41	66	Qualification for Champions League third qualifying round
3	AEK Athens	30	19	4	7	61	34	+27	61	Qualification for UEFA Cup qualifying round
4	PAOK	30	14	9	7	66	48	+18	51	Qualification for UEFA Cup first round (Note: PAOK were qualified for first round of the 2001–02 UEFA Cup as Greek Football Cup winners.)
5	Iraklis	30	14	4	12	45	40	+5	46	

Source: Galanis Sports Data
Rules for classification: 1) Points; 2) Head-to-head points; 3) Head-to-head goal difference; 4) Goal difference; 5) Goals scored; 6) Goals against; 7) Play-offs (neutral ground); 8) Draw.
(Note: Criterion 7 is only used if needed to decide champion, teams for relegation or teams for UEFA competitions).
(C) Champions

==== Matches ====
16 September 2000 1	Panathinaikos	2–1	PAS Giannina	Ampelokipoi
	Liberopoulos 31'; Xhumba 66' (o.g.)		Lipatín 71'	Stadium: Leoforos Alexandras Stadium

23 September 2000 2	Panionios	0–2	Panathinaikos	Nea Smyrni
			Basinas 27' (pen.); Liberopoulos 51'	Stadium: Nea Smyrni Stadium

1 October 2000 3	Panathinaikos	2–2	Aris	Ampelokipoi
	Karagounis 52'; Vlaović 82'		Ba 19'; Agathokleous 73'	Stadium: Leoforos Alexandras Stadium

29 October 2000 4	OFI	0–0	Panathinaikos	Heraklion
				Stadium: Theodoros Vardinogiannis Stadium

5 November 2000 5	Panathinaikos	2–0	Paniliakos	Ampelokipoi
	Warzycha 66', 76'			Stadium: Leoforos Alexandras Stadium

12 November 2000 6	Panathinaikos	0–0	Olympiacos	Ampelokipoi
				Stadium: Leoforos Alexandras Stadium

18 November 2000 7	PAOK	2–2	Panathinaikos	Thessaloniki
	Nalitzis 11'; Karadimos 25'		Vlaović 57'; Sypniewski 78'	Stadium: Toumba Stadium

25 November 2000 8	Panathinaikos	3–0	Skoda Xanthi	Ampelokipoi
	Liberopoulos 2', 58', 76'			Stadium: Leoforos Alexandras Stadium

3 December 2000 9	Iraklis	0–1	Panathinaikos	Thessaloniki
			Warzycha 77'	Stadium: Kaftanzoglio Stadium

10 December 2000 10	Panathinaikos	1–0	Athinaikos	Ampelokipoi
	Liberopoulos 18'			Stadium: Leoforos Alexandras Stadium

17 December 2000 11	Ethnikos Asteras	0–3	Panathinaikos	Kaisariani
			Karagounis 45'; Sigurðsson 78', 90+2'	Stadium: Michalis Kritikopoulos Stadium

3 January 2001 12	Panathinaikos	4–1	Ionikos	Ampelokipoi
	Warzycha 8', 54'; Liberopoulos 19'; Xanthopoulos 64' (o.g.)		Brewster 45+2'	Stadium: Leoforos Alexandras Stadium

7 January 2001 13	AEK Athens	1–1	Panathinaikos	Nea Filadelfeia
	Tsiartas 90+2' (pen.)		Liberopoulos 28'	Stadium: Nikos Goumas Stadium

14 January 2001 14	Panachaiki	1–2	Panathinaikos	Patras
	Solakis 30'		Karagounis 69'; Boateng 90+2'	Stadium: Kostas Davourlis Stadium

21 January 2001 15	Panathinaikos	1–0	Kalamata	Ampelokipoi
	Boateng 15'			Stadium: Leoforos Alexandras Stadium

28 January 2001 16	PAS Giannina	0–4	Panathinaikos	Ioannina
			Liberopoulos 8'; Vokolos 38'; Koutsoures 45+2'; Nasiopoulos 86'	Stadium: Zosimades Stadium

4 February 2001 17	Panathinaikos	0–1	Panionios	Ampelokipoi
			Roberts 90+6'	Stadium: Leoforos Alexandras Stadium

10 February 2001 18	Aris	1–0	Panathinaikos	Thessaloniki
	Charisteas 29'			Stadium: Kleanthis Vikelidis Stadium

17 February 2001 19	Panathinaikos	2–0	OFI	Ampelokipoi
	Liberopoulos 60'; Warzycha 78'			Stadium: Leoforos Alexandras Stadium

24 February 2001 20	Paniliakos	0–3	Panathinaikos	Pyrgos
			Vlaović 39'; Olisadebe 59'; Basinas 84' (pen.)	Stadium: Pyrgos Stadium

4 March 2001 21	Olympiacos	1–0	Panathinaikos	Marousi
	Đorđević 68'			Stadium: Olympic Stadium

10 March 2001 22	Panathinaikos	5–2	PAOK	Ampelokipoi
	Warzycha 12'; Pflipsen 43' (pen.); Olisadebe 55'; Basinas 68'; Vlaović 78'		Georgiadis 45+2' (pen.); Nalitzis 85'	Stadium: Leoforos Alexandras Stadium

17 March 2001 23	Skoda Xanthi	0–2	Panathinaikos	Xanthi
			Vlaović 20', 44'	Stadium: A.O. Xanthi Stadium

1 April 2001 24	Panathinaikos	2–1	Iraklis	Ampelokipoi
	Liberopoulos 37'; Warzycha 70'		Xenidis 75'	Stadium: Leoforos Alexandras Stadium

8 April 2001 25	Athinaikos	0–4	Panathinaikos	Vyronas
			Warzycha 22', 42'; Karagounis 45+2'; Vlaović 74'	Stadium: Vyronas National Stadium

22 April 2001 26	Panathinaikos	2–0	Ethnikos Asteras	Ampelokipoi
	Vlaović 58', 82'			Stadium: Leoforos Alexandras Stadium

29 April 2001 27	Ionikos	3–3	Panathinaikos	Piraeus
	Vilanakis 2', 58'; Brewster 40'		Boateng 68'; Warzycha 77'; Vokolos 90+4'	Stadium: Neapoli Stadium

7 May 2001 28	Panathinaikos	0–1	AEK Athens	Ampelokipoi
			Nikolaidis 77'	Stadium: Leoforos Alexandras Stadium

20 May 2001 29	Panathinaikos	4–0	Panachaiki	Ampelokipoi
	Olisadebe 4', 59'; Warzycha 25'; Pflipsen 56'			Stadium: Leoforos Alexandras Stadium

27 May 2001 30	Kalamata	2–4	Panathinaikos	Kalamata
	Kalantzis 14'; Bachramis 80'		Vlaović 31', 38', 72'; Warzycha 90'	Stadium: Kalamata Municipal Stadium

=== Greek Cup ===
==== Group 6 ====
Pos	Team	Pld	W	D	L	GF	GA	GD	Pts	Qualification	PAO	AEK	AEL	ETP	KOZ	OLV
1	Panathinaikos	10	9	0	1	25	7	+18	27	Round of 16		2–1	3–1	1–0	3–0	4–1
2	AEK Athens	10	8	1	1	38	10	+28	25	Round of 16	3–1		1–0	8–0	5–2	9–1
3	AEL	10	3	2	5	10	13	−3	11		0–2	2–2		1–2	2–1	2–0
4	Ethnikos Piraeus	10	3	1	6	10	23	−13	10		0–3	0–3	0–1		2–1	3–1
5	Kozani	10	2	2	6	13	23	−10	8		1–3	1–4	1–1	1–1		2–0
6	Olympiacos Volos	10	2	0	8	10	30	−20	6		0–3	1–2	1–0	3–2	2–3	

Source: epo.gr

===== Matches =====
5 August 2000 Matchday 1	Panathinaikos	4–1	Olympiacos Volos	Marousi
13:00 EEST	Karagounis 12', 27'; Liberopoulos 54' (pen.); Nasiopoulos 83'	Report (page 30)	Zagavieros 37'	Stadium: Olympic Stadium

2 August 2000 Matchday 2	Ethnikos Piraeus	0–3	Panathinaikos	Kaisariani
13:00 EEST		Report (page 30)	Sypniewski 19'; Sigurðsson 36', 64'	Stadium: Michalis Kritikopoulos Stadium

13 August 2000 Matchday 3	Panathinaikos	2–1	AEK Athens	Marousi
21:00 EEST	Sypniewski 35'; Vokolos 79'	Report (page 31)	Tsiartas 55' (pen.)	Stadium: Olympic Stadium; Attendance: 6,490; Referee: Kostas Finokaliotis (Athens)

19 August 2000 Matchday 4	AEL	0–2	Panathinaikos	Larissa
13:00 EEST		Report (page 32)	Kola 35'; Sypniewski 60'	Stadium: Alcazar Stadium

31 August 2000 Matchday 5	Panathinaikos	3–0	Kozani	Marousi
13:00 EEST	Nasiopoulos 39'; Pflipsen 44'; Kiassos 79'	Report (page 32)		Stadium: Olympic Stadium

27 August 2000 Matchday 6	Olympiacos Volos	0–3	Panathinaikos	Volos
13:00 EEST		Report (page 33)	Vlaović 25', 90'; Sigurðsson 87'	Stadium: Volos Municipal Stadium

4 September 2000 Matchday 7	Panathinaikos	1–0	Ethnikos Piraeus	Marousi
13:00 EEST	Basinas 9'	Report (page 33)		Stadium: Olympic Stadium

29 November 2000 Matchday 8	AEK Athens	3–1	Panathinaikos	Nea Filadelfeia
19:45 EET	Kostis 28'; Konstantinidis 33', 71'	Report (page 34)	Sigurðsson 10'	Stadium: Nikos Goumas Stadium; Attendance: 1,309; Referee: Stavros Flotsios (Boeotia)

5 October 2000 Matchday 9	Panathinaikos	3–1	AEL	Marousi
13:00 EEST	Vlaović 38', 56'; Sypniewski 40'	Report (page 34)	Teas 51' (pen.)	Stadium: Olympic Stadium

9 October 2000 Matchday 10	Kozani	1–3	Panathinaikos	Kozani
13:00 EEST	Kaounos 40'	Report (page 35)	Fyssas 15'; Pflipsen 43'; Sypniewski 46'	Stadium: Kozani Stadium

==== Round of 16 ====
17 January 2001 First leg	Panionios	1–0	Panathinaikos	Nea Smyrni
18:30 EET	Jovanović 47'	Report (page 48)		Stadium: Nea Smyrni Stadium; Attendance: 956; Referee: Pavlos Papilias (Piraeus)

31 January 2001 Second leg	Panathinaikos	7–2 (7–3 agg.)	Panionios	Ampelokipoi
18:30 EET	Basinas 11', 67'; Warzycha 14', 36', 52'; Nasiopoulos 63'; Koutsoures 86'	Report (page 49)	Ioannou 28'; Préget 90'	Stadium: Leoforos Alexandras Stadium; Attendance: 5,152

==== Quarter-finals ====
7 February 2001 First leg	Olympiacos	1–1	Panathinaikos	Marousi
20:00 EET	Đorđević 27' (pen.)	Report (page 50)	Liberopoulos 88'	Stadium: Olympic Stadium; Attendance: 42,845; Referee: Giorgos Tsangarakis (Chania)

21 March 2001 Second leg	Panathinaikos	1–4 (2–5 agg.)	Olympiacos	Ampelokipoi
20:00 EET	Liberopoulos 43'	Report (page 51)	Alexandris 5'; Luciano 9'; Georgatos 61' (pen.); Giovanni 84'	Stadium: Leoforos Alexandras Stadium; Attendance: 12,759; Referee: Thanasis Briakos (Epirus)

=== UEFA Champions League ===
==== Qualifying phase ====
===== Third qualifying round =====
9 August 2000 First leg	Polonia Warsaw (Poland)	2–2	(Greece) Panathinaikos	Płock, Poland (Note: Polonia Warsaw played their home matches at Stadion Wisły in Płock, instead of their regular venue Stadion Polonii Warszawa in Warsaw.)
20:00	Kiełbowicz 45'; Kaliszan 68'	Report	Warzycha 11'; Fyssas 37'	Stadium: Stadion Wisły; Attendance: 7,700; Referee: Paulo Paraty (Portugal)

23 August 2000 Second leg	Panathinaikos (Greece)	2–1 (4–3 agg.)	(Poland) Polonia Warsaw	Athens, Greece
20:00	Liberopoulos 30'; Pfipsen 61' (pen.)	Report	Bąk 86'	Stadium: Olympic Stadium; Attendance: 41,156; Referee: Edgar Steinborn (Germany)

==== First group stage ====
Group E

Pos	Team	Pld	W	D	L	GF	GA	GD	Pts	Qualification
1	(Spain) Deportivo La Coruña	6	2	4	0	6	4	+2	10	Advance to second group stage
2	(Greece) Panathinaikos	6	2	2	2	6	5	+1	8	Advance to second group stage
3	(Germany) Hamburger SV	6	1	3	2	9	9	0	6	Transfer to UEFA Cup
4	(Italy) Juventus	6	1	3	2	9	12	−3	6	

Source: UEFA

13 September 2000 1	Panathinaikos (Greece)	1–1	(Spain) Deportivo La Coruña	Athens, Greece
20:45	Warzycha 29'	Report	Naybet 84'	Stadium: Olympic Stadium; Attendance: 48,050; Referee: Hugh Dallas (Scotland)

19 September 2000 2	Juventus (Italy)	2–1	(Greece) Panathinaikos	Turin, Italy
20:45	Tacchinardi 35'; Trezeguet 83'	Report	Goumas 45+2'	Stadium: Stadio delle Alpi; Attendance: 35,425; Referee: Rune Pedersen (Norway)

26 September 2000 3	Hamburg (Germany)	0–1	(Greece) Panathinaikos	Hamburg, Germany
20:45		Report	Nasiopoulos 36'	Stadium: Volksparkstadion; Attendance: 44,350; Referee: Dermot Gallagher (England)

18 October 2000 4	Panathinaikos (Greece)	0–0	(Germany) Hamburg	Athens, Greece
20:45		Report		Stadium: Olympic Stadium; Attendance: 37,680; Referee: Leslie Irvine (Northern Ireland)

24 October 2000 5	Deportivo La Coruña (Spain)	1–0	(Greece) Panathinaikos	A Coruña, Spain
20:45	Pandiani 82'	Report		Stadium: Estadio Riazor; Attendance: 22,325; Referee: Kim Milton Nielsen (Denmark)

8 November 2000 6	Panathinaikos (Greece)	3–1	(Italy) Juventus	Athens, Greece
20:45	Sousa 7'; Basinas 58' (pen.); Warzycha 65'	Report	Inzaghi 24'	Stadium: Olympic Stadium; Attendance: 67,000; Referee: Dick Jol (Netherlands)

==== Second group stage ====
Group A

Pos	Team	Pld	W	D	L	GF	GA	GD	Pts	Qualification
1	(Spain) Valencia	6	3	3	0	10	2	+8	12	Advance to knockout stage
2	(England) Manchester United	6	3	3	0	10	3	+7	12	Advance to knockout stage
3	(Austria) Sturm Graz	6	2	0	4	4	13	−9	6	
4	(Greece) Panathinaikos	6	0	2	4	4	10	−6	2	

Source: UEFA

21 November 2000 1	Manchester United (England)	3–1	(Greece) Panathinaikos	Manchester, England
20:45	Sheringham 48'; Scholes 81', 90'	Report	Karagounis 64'	Stadium: Old Trafford; Attendance: 65,024; Referee: Domenico Messina (Italy)

6 December 2000 2	Panathinaikos (Greece)	0–0	(Spain) Valencia	Athens, Greece
20:45		Report		Stadium: Olympic Stadium; Attendance: 42,050; Referee: Markus Merk (Germany)

14 February 2001 3	Sturm Graz (Austria)	2–0	(Greece) Panathinaikos	Graz, Austria
20:45	Haas 60'; Kocijan 85'	Report		Stadium: Arnold-Schwarzenegger-Stadion; Attendance: 16,500; Referee: Ryszard Wójcik (Poland)

20 February 2001 4	Panathinaikos (Greece)	1–2	(Austria) Sturm Graz	Athens, Greece
20:45	Goumas 73'	Report	Schopp 25'; Haas 42'	Stadium: Olympic Stadium; Attendance: 14,400; Referee: Alain Sars (France)

7 March 2001 5	Panathinaikos (Greece)	1–1	(England) Manchester United	Athens, Greece
20:45	Seitaridis 25'	Report	Scholes 90+2'	Stadium: Olympic Stadium; Attendance: 27,231; Referee: Karl-Erik Nilsson (Sweden)

13 March 2001 6	Valencia (Spain)	2–1	(Greece) Panathinaikos	Valencia, Spain
20:45	Juan Sánchez 39'; Angloma 75'	Report	Basinas 28' (pen.)	Stadium: Mestalla Stadium; Attendance: 40,000; Referee: Knud Erik Fisker (Denmark)
