= Giorgos Karagounis =

Greek footballer (born 1977)

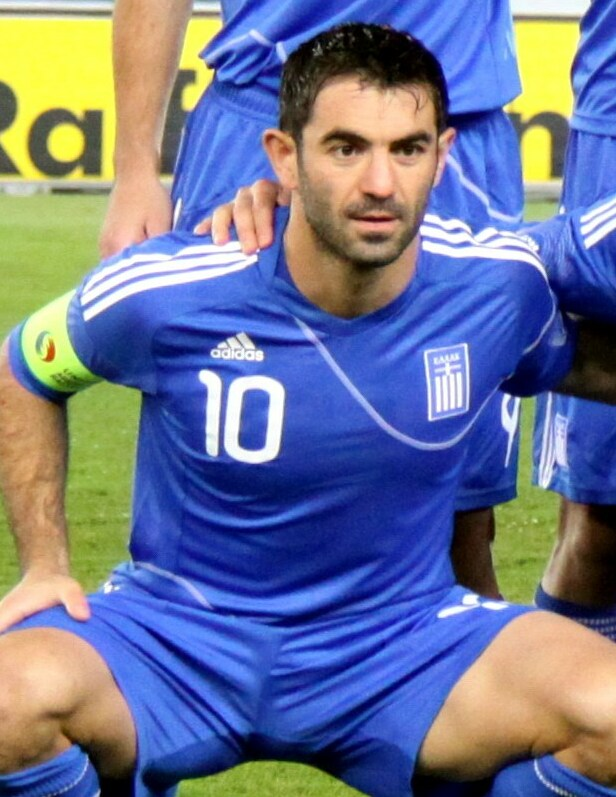
- Karagounis playing for Greece in 2010

Personal information
- Full name: Georgios Karagkounis
- Date of birth: 6 March 1977 (age 49)
- Place of birth: Pyrgos, Greece
- Height: 1.76 m (5 ft 9 in)
- Position: Midfielder

Youth career
- 1993–1996: Panathinaikos

Senior career*
Years	Team	Apps	(Gls)
1996–2003	Panathinaikos	118	(25)
1996–1998	→ Apollon Smyrnis (loan)	55	(9)
2003–2005	Inter Milan	21	(0)
2005–2007	Benfica	45	(3)
2007–2012	Panathinaikos	133	(16)
2012–2014	Fulham	39	(1)
Total		411	(54)

International career
1996–1999	Greece U21	39	(11)
1999–2014	Greece	139	(10)
Medal record
Men's football
Representing Greece (as player)
UEFA European Championship
Winner	2004
World Military Cup
Winner	1997
UEFA European U-21 Championship
Runner-up	1998
- * Club domestic league appearances and goals

Georgios Karagkounis (Greek: Γεώργιος Καραγκούνης; born 6 March 1977), known as Giorgos Karagounis (Greek: Γιώργος Καραγκούνης), is a former Greek professional footballer who played as a midfielder.

In his club career, Karagounis played for Panathinaikos, Apollon Smyrnis, Inter Milan, Benfica and Fulham.

At international level, Karagounis represented Greece between 1999 and 2014. He was a member of the UEFA Euro 2004 winning squad, and also represented Greece at UEFA Euro 2008, the 2010 FIFA World Cup, UEFA Euro 2012 and the 2014 FIFA World Cup. With 139 appearances, he is the most capped player in the history of the Greece national team.

== Early life ==
Karagounis was born in Pyrgos. He grew up in Ampelonas, Elis.

He started playing football in Ampelonas FC and then to Paniliakos F.C. He was discovered by Juan Ramón Rocha in 1990 and encouraged his family to send him to the Panathinaikos academy.

== Club career ==
=== Panathinaikos and loan to Apollon Smyrnis ===
Karagounis began his professional career in 1996 when he signed on loan for Apollon Smyrnis from Panathinaikos. In his first couple of years with the Athens-based club, he already showed signs of his talent as a very energetic player in the centre of midfield who could also score goals. After two seasons with Apollon, he returned to his parent club Panathinaikos in 1998, the club where he learned his trade.

At Panathinaikos he became a fixture in the first team for the next five years. Although Panathinaikos did not win the Alpha Ethniki title during his spell due to several controversial reasons, including a ball-fixing scandal, the team was always a title contender, and had good runs in both the UEFA Champions League and the UEFA Cup, with Karagounis scoring important goals for the team. He scored 6 times in 24 league matches during his first season with the Greens, and in the 2000–01 UEFA Champions League, he appeared in all 12 of Panathanaikos' games, scoring a memorable goal from a free kick against Manchester United at Old Trafford.

The following season, at the Leoforos Alexandras Stadium, Karagounis scored a wonderful goal against Arsenal, beating David Seaman with a header to help his team reach the quarter-finals of the Champions League.

=== Inter Milan ===
In the summer of 2003, Karagounis left Panathinaikos to join Italian Serie A club Inter Milan. During his first season with Inter, he was not a regular starter in the league, mainly appearing in European and Coppa Italia matches. At the end of his first season in Italy, despite Karagounis spending a lot of time on the substitutes' bench, Inter could only finish a disappointing fourth, with city rivals Milan winning the title. Regardless, he was called up to represent Greece at UEFA Euro 2004 in Portugal.

After helping Greece win that tournament, he returned to Italy for the 2004–05 season. Under Roberto Mancini, he was again mainly used in European and domestic Coppa Italia matches rather than in Serie A matches. He won the 2004–05 Coppa Italia, helping Inter beat Roma in the final. At the end of the 2004–05 season, Inter finished third in Serie A, with Juventus winning the title. Inter also reached the quarter-finals of the Champions League, suffering elimination by Milan.

=== Benfica ===
In 2005, Karagounis moved to Portugal to sign a three-year contract with Benfica, who are based at the Estádio da Luz, the stadium where he won the Euro 2004 final with Greece.

Karagounis scored a couple of memorable long-range goals while in Portugal, against Shakhtar Donetsk, and a free kick against Desportivo das Aves.

Karagounis' first season at Benfica was challenging, as he had difficulty establishing himself as a first-team regular. However, he became a regular starter in his second season, putting in some excellent performances and becoming a fan favourite, who were by this time managed by Fernando Santos, who already knew Karagounis from their time together at Panathinaikos. After a successful stint with Benfica, Karagounis seemed ready to return to play in Greece, again for Panathinaikos.

Karagounis would return to the Estádio da Luz to play for a Benfica All-Stars team in a charity match against a team that included Zinedine Zidane and Ronaldo in 2010.

=== Return to Panathinaikos ===
Karagounis' contract with Benfica was due to expire in July 2008, but his immediate departure was negotiated due to personal issues. After his release in the summer of 2007, Karagounis immediately returned to Panathinaikos, signing for the club for the next three years. He quickly re-established himself in the team again, scoring key goals, especially in Europe.

With his acquisition by the Athenians regarded as the start of a new era at the club, Karagounis emerged not only as a leading figure at club level, but for Greece as well. He established himself as the captain of the national team. Karagounis' grit and dedication continued to give Panathinaikos an edge as the team made progress in Europe. On 3 September 2009, Karagounis extended his stay until 2012 and stated he wanted to end his career at the club. As captain of the team, he won his first Superleague title and the Greek Cup. A 79th-minute strike by Karagounis secured Panathinaikos three UEFA Europa League points in Group F.

=== Fulham ===
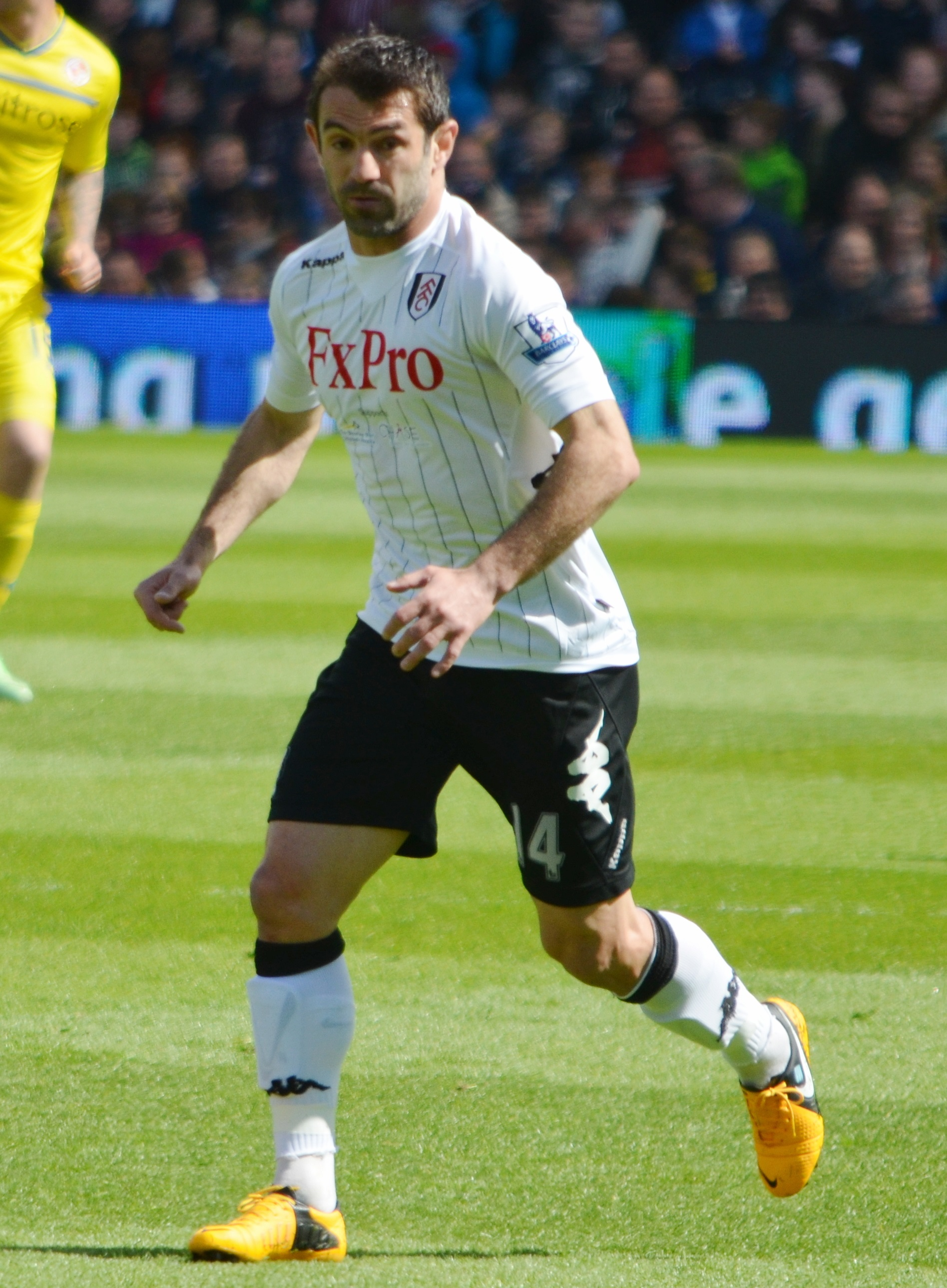
Karagounis playing for Fulham in 2013

On 11 September 2012, Karagounis left Panathinaikos to join English Premier League side Fulham on a free transfer. Karagounis became the eighth Greek player from the Euro 2004-winning side to play in the Premier League, after Nikos Dabizas, Stelios Giannakopoulos, Vassilios Lakis, Theodoros Zagorakis, Angelos Basinas and Kostas Chalkias. Speaking at Fulham's Motspur Park Training Ground, Karagounis said, "I'm delighted to have signed for Fulham Football Club and I am excited by a new challenge in England and the Premier League. I'm looking forward to working under Martin Jol and playing alongside some fantastic players at this Club." Then-Fulham manager Martin Jol added, "Giorgos Karagounis has a wealth of club and international experience and I'm happy that he's joined us for this season. He's been an influential player for his club sides and is a renowned player in world football as he's about to become the most-capped player for Greece. He brings many certain qualities to our squad."

Karagounis made his debut for the club in the Premier League on 29 September 2012, against Manchester City at Craven Cottage, coming on in the 81st minute to replace Chris Baird. Karagounis played the full 90 minutes for Fulham in their 4–0 loss to Liverpool at Anfield. He scored his first goal in England on 5 January 2013 in the FA Cup against Blackpool in the 80th minute, with a "stunning 25-yard half-volley" which went in off the underside of the crossbar; the match ended 1–1. On 12 January 2013, a week after his FA Cup strike, he scored his first Premier League goal against Wigan Athletic in the 22nd minute.

Karagounis was 1 of 12 players released by Fulham at the end of the 2012–13 season.

However, Karagounis declared his interest to return to Fulham through his agent Paschalis Tountouris. On 9 July 2013, Karagounis signed a new one-year deal to rejoin Fulham. In his second season with the Cottagers, Karagounis scored his only goal in a 4–3 loss for League Cup against Leicester City when he equalised with just three minutes to play, but could not prevent Leicester from scoring a late winner. Karagounis suffered from muscle problems throughout the season, but on 19 April 2014, he came on as a substitute in his last match for the club in a 3–1 away defeat against Tottenham Hotspur. Fulham was relegated from the Premier League at the end of the season.

Karagounis was one of nine players released by Fulham in the summer of 2014, and retired from football after the 2014 FIFA World Cup.

== International career ==
=== Early years ===
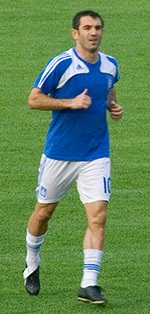
Karagounis playing for Greece in 2008

Karagounis captained Greece's entry to the 1998 UEFA European Under-21 Championship, and the team came very close to winning, losing 1–0 to Spain in the final. After that, he soon became a regular on the national team. He made his first full international appearance against El Salvador in 1999 and went on to appear in 2002 FIFA World Cup qualification.

=== UEFA Euro 2004 and beyond ===
The highlight of his international career was undoubtedly winning the UEFA European Championship for Greece at Euro 2004. He was a key player for Greece and famously scored the first goal of the tournament against Portugal, a stunning long-range shot that shocked the hosts and gave Greece the confidence they needed to win the game and progress in the tournament. After winning Euro 2004, Karagounis continued to play on a regular basis for Greece in the 2005 FIFA Confederations Cup, 2006 FIFA World Cup qualification and UEFA Euro 2008. On 26 March 2008, Karagounis participated in a Greece–Portugal friendly match in Düsseldorf. This proved to be somewhat of a highlight of his international career, as he scored two almost identical well-placed free kicks to give Greece a 2–1 victory.

Karagounis, as a captain of Greece, contributed to the nation's qualification for the 2010 FIFA World Cup. As captain, he led Greece to its first win in a World Cup match with a 2–1 win against Nigeria. On 8 October 2010, against Latvia, Karagounis reached 100 international appearances, equaling the record of his former Greece teammate Angelos Basinas. On 12 October 2010, Karagounis made his 101st appearance, becoming the second-most capped player in Greek footballing history, behind Theodoros Zagorakis, and scoring his seventh goal in the victory against the Israel national team. On 7 October 2011, Karagounis was awarded by Zagorakis and Basinas for reaching 111 appearances with Greece. The awarding ceremony took place at the Karaiskakis Stadium in Athens before Greece's kickoff against Croatia.

=== UEFA Euro 2012 ===
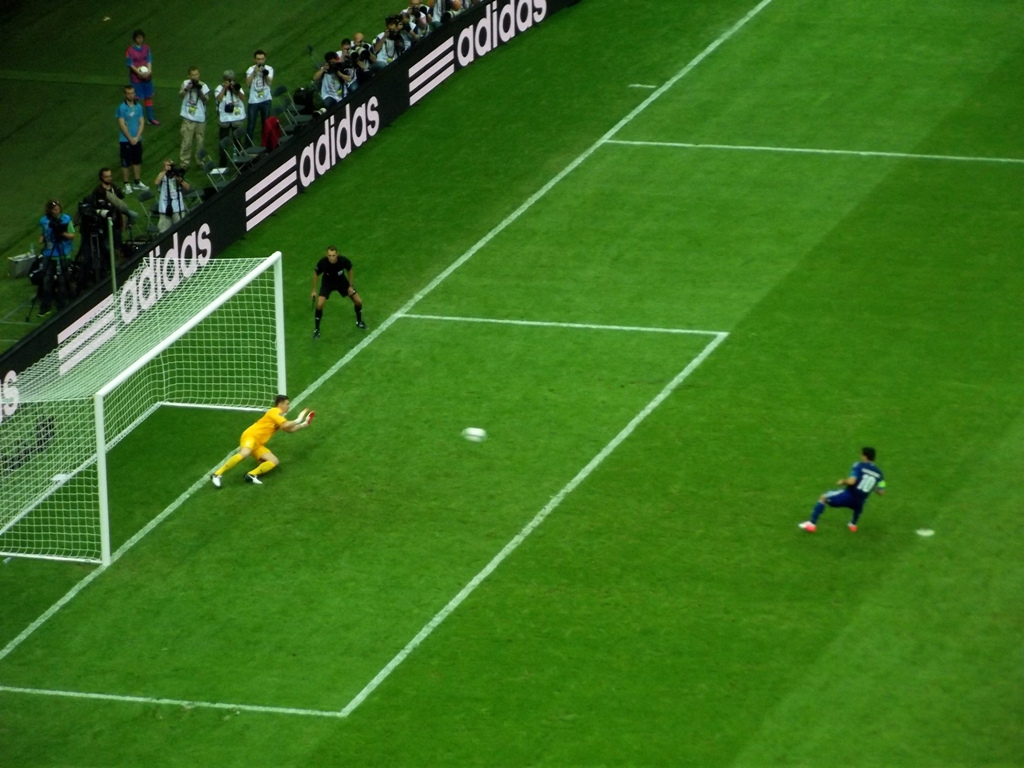
Karagounis' penalty for Greece at UEFA Euro 2012, saved by Polish goalkeeper Przemysław Tytoń

On 8 June 2012, Poland played with Greece on the opening day of Euro 2012. Poland goalkeeper Wojciech Szczęsny fouled Greek international Dimitris Salpingidis, resulting in a red card for Szczęsny. Karagounis took the penalty against substitute goalkeeper Przemysław Tytoń, who saved Karagounis' penalty.

On 16 June 2012, Karagounis started the final match of Group A against Russia, making him Greece's joint-most capped player with 120 caps, together with Theodoros Zagorakis. Karagounis scored the only goal of the match, at the stroke of half-time. This meant Greece qualified for the next stage of the competition. The second half was slightly less dramatic but had its share of talking points. Coming off a significant goal, Karagounis made a mad dash to the Russian box. The captain looked like he was going to score another, but his leg was caught by a Russian defender. Karagounis was adamant he had earned a penalty, but the referee was not impressed and booked him for simulation. Karagounis received his second yellow card of the tournament, forcing him to miss the quarter-finals.

=== Qualification for 2014 FIFA World Cup and record ===
On 12 October 2012, Karagounis played in the second half in the match against Bosnia and Herzegovina in 2014 FIFA World Cup qualification, making the 121st appearance for his country. With this match, he set a new record of most caps for Greece, surpassing Zagorakis. He also scored a free-kick goal against the Liechtenstein national football team. Karagounis played another inspiring and energetic role throughout the qualifying campaign and helped lead to its third World Cup finals appearance. Despite the waning number of starts for the 37-year-old, his influence was still large for Greece. Greece head coach Fernando Santos, who worked with Karagounis at both Panathinaikos and Benfica, held him in high regard due to the sureness the veteran exudes. "We have confidence and know we can beat any opponent", Karagounis said during World Cup qualifying. Karagounis played the entire 120 minutes of the match between Costa Rica and Greece for the World Cup 2014, consisting of 90 minutes of regular time and 30 minutes of extra time.

Karagounis retired from international football after Greece's World Cup elimination in a penalty shootout loss to Costa Rica. He left as the nation's most capped player with 139 appearances over 15 years since making his debut in 1999. Greece's goalscorer in the Costa Rica match, defender Sokratis Papastathopoulos, paid tribute to his departing leader: "He's written his own story ... he's the record holder [of caps], he's given everything for the team and had to make concessions for it... He's left us a legacy for the future. He shouldn't worry."

== Style of play ==
As a midfielder, Karagounis was short in stature, standing at 5 feet nine inches. He was largely known for his tough, gritty play on the field. He gained many comparisons to "The General", Mimis Domazos. Karagounis was known for his dribbling, and creative passing, especially the accuracy of his long passes. Karagounis was described as a "dogged worker in the midfield and a deliverer of fine set plays". During his career he was one of the finer set piece exponents in Europe. His dribbling was noted as one of his strengths, with Karagounis able to win his own free kicks as well as provide a sometimes-laboured attack with bursts of energy. He also possessed a shooting ability from distance and combined his varied attacking talents with an aggression in midfield that made him able to win the ball back, as well as produce with it at his feet.

== Career statistics ==
=== Club ===
Appearances and goals by club, season and competition
Club	Season	League			National cup (Note: Includes Greek Football Cup, Coppa Italia, Taça de Portugal, FA Cup)		League cup (Note: Includes Football League Cup)		Europe		Total	
Club	Season	Division	Apps	Goals	Apps	Goals	Apps	Goals	Apps	Goals	Apps	Goals
Apollon Smyrnis	1996–97	Alpha Ethniki	31	2	2	0	—		—		33	2
Apollon Smyrnis	1997–98	Alpha Ethniki	24	7	2	0	—		—		26	7
Apollon Smyrnis	Total		55	9	4	0	—		—		59	9
Panathinaikos	1998–99	Alpha Ethniki	24	6	5	1	—		0	0	29	7
Panathinaikos	1999–2000	Alpha Ethniki	27	9	4	2	—		5 (Note: Appearances in UEFA Cup)	0	36	11
Panathinaikos	2000–01	Alpha Ethniki	23	4	5	2	—		14 (Note: Appearances in UEFA Champions League)	1	42	7
Panathinaikos	2001–02	Alpha Ethniki	21	3	5	0	—		15	3	41	6
Panathinaikos	2002–03	Alpha Ethniki	23	3	3	0	—		10	0	36	3
Panathinaikos	Total		118	25	22	5	—		44	4	184	34
Inter Milan	2003–04	Serie A	9	0	3	0	—		4	0	16	0
Inter Milan	2004–05	Serie A	12	0	5	0	—		3	0	20	0
Inter Milan	Total		21	0	8	0	—		7	0	36	0
Benfica	2005–06	Primeira Liga	19	1	4	0	—		7	0	30	1
Benfica	2006–07	Primeira Liga	26	2	2	0	—		9 (Note: Three appearances in UEFA Champions League, six appearances in UEFA Cup)	0	37	2
Benfica	Total		45	3	6	0	—		16	0	67	3
Panathinaikos	2007–08	Super League Greece	32	6	2	0	—		6	0	40	6
Panathinaikos	2008–09	Super League Greece	24	7	1	0	—		10	3	35	10
Panathinaikos	2009–10	Super League Greece	24	2	5	0	—		12 (Note: Appearances in UEFA Europa League)	1	41	3
Panathinaikos	2010–11	Super League Greece	28	0	2	0	—		4	0	34	0
Panathinaikos	2011–12	Super League Greece	25	1	2	0	—		3 (Note: Two appearances in UEFA Champions League, one appearance in UEFA Europa League)	0	30	1
Panathinaikos	Total		133	16	12	0	—		35	4	180	20
Fulham	2012–13	Premier League	25	1	3	1	0	0	—		28	2
Fulham	2013–14	Premier League	14	0	2	0	3	1	—		19	1
Fulham	Total		39	1	5	1	3	1	—		47	3
Career total			411	54	57	6	3	1	102	8	573	69

=== International ===
Appearances and goals by national team and year
National team	Year	Apps	Goals
Greece	1999	1	0
Greece	2000	5	0
Greece	2001	8	1
Greece	2002	5	1
Greece	2003	9	0
Greece	2004	11	1
Greece	2005	10	1
Greece	2006	9	0
Greece	2007	11	0
Greece	2008	12	2
Greece	2009	9	0
Greece	2010	12	1
Greece	2011	12	1
Greece	2012	8	1
Greece	2013	9	1
Greece	2014	8	0
Total		139	10

Scores and results list Greece's goal tally first, score column indicates score after each Karagounis goal

List of international goals scored by Giorgos Karagounis
No.	Date	Venue	Opponent	Score	Result	Competition
1	5 September 2001	Helsinki, Finland	Finland	1–2	1–5	2002 FIFA World Cup qualification
2	13 February 2002	Thessaloniki, Greece	Sweden	2–2	2–2	Friendly
3	12 June 2004	Porto, Portugal	Portugal	1–0	2–1	UEFA Euro 2004
4	30 March 2005	Athens, Greece	Albania	2–0	2–0	2006 FIFA World Cup qualification
5	26 March 2008	Düsseldorf, Germany	Portugal	1–0	2–1	Friendly
6	26 March 2008	Düsseldorf, Germany	Portugal	2–0	2–1	Friendly
7	12 October 2010	Athens, Greece	Israel	2–1	2–1	UEFA Euro 2012 qualifying
8	15 November 2011	Altach, Austria	Romania	1–1	1–3	Friendly
9	16 June 2012	Warsaw, Poland	Russia	1–0	1–0	UEFA Euro 2012
10	15 October 2013	Piraeus, Greece	Liechtenstein	2–0	2–0	2014 FIFA World Cup qualification

== Honours ==
Inter Milan

- Coppa Italia: 2004–05

Panathinaikos

- Super League Greece: 2009–10
- Greek Cup: 2009–10

Greece U21

- UEFA European Under-21 Championship runner-up: 1998

Greece

- UEFA European Championship: 2004

== See also ==
- List of men's footballers with 100 or more international caps
