= Igor Sypniewski =

Polish footballer (1974–2022)

Personal information
- Date of birth: 10 November 1974
- Place of birth: Łódź, Poland
- Date of death: 4 November 2022 (aged 47)
- Place of death: Łódź, Poland
- Height: 1.83 m (6 ft 0 in)
- Position: Forward

Youth career
- 1986–1991: PTC Pabianice

Senior career*
| Years | Team | Apps | (Gls) |
| 1991–1995 | ŁKS Łódź | 2 | (0) |
| 1992–1993 | → Orzeł Łódź (loan) | | |
| 1995–1997 | Ceramika Opoczno | | |
| 1997–1998 | Kavala | 19 | (7) |
| 1998–2001 | Panathinaikos | 53 | (18) |
| 2001 | OFI | 10 | (1) |
| 2001 | RKS Radomsko | 9 | (4) |
| 2002 | Wisła Kraków | 6 | (1) |
| 2002–2003 | → Kallithea (loan) | 2 | (0) |
| 2003 | Halmstads BK | 21 | (10) |
| 2004 | Malmö FF | 8 | (2) |
| 2004 | Trelleborg | 2 | (0) |
| 2005–2006 | ŁKS Łódź | 46 | (16) |
| 2006 | Bunkeflo IF | 7 | (5) |

International career
| 1999–2001 | Poland | 2 | (0) |
- * Club domestic league appearances and goals

Igor Sypniewski (10 November 1974 – 4 November 2022) was a Polish professional footballer who played as a forward.

Born and raised in Łódź, he was initially regarded as one of European football's most promising prospects. However, ongoing struggle with alcohol, gambling and mental health problems limited his career progression, leading commentators and sports historians to frequently highlight him as an unfulfilled talent.

Well regarded in both Greece and Sweden aside from his native country, his career highlight is considered to be the 2000–01 and 2001–2002 seasons with leading Greek club Panathinaikos for whom he scored important Champions League goals in Europe.

== Career ==
=== Early life and career ===
Born in Łódź on 10 November 1974, Sypniewski's career revolved around ŁKS Łódź, his boyhood club. He reportedly had his first beer and cigarette when he was eight years old, whilst hanging around the Koziny area where he would go on to frequent during his life. He started playing for PTC Pabianice aged 11, his first formal club.

He had behavioural problems early on, frequently getting into fights with players from other neighbourhoods. After appearing intoxicated at training several times, he was transferred to Orzeł Łódź temporarily and subsequently to Opoczno-based Ceramika as a result.

He went on to play several seasons in the Polish Ekstraklasa and I liga for ŁKS.

=== Greece ===
Sypniewski then spent several seasons playing in the Super League Greece with Kavala, Panathinaikos and OFI.

Unknown outside Poland, he was successful at Kavala and it was soon evident that a bigger club would be after him. He appeared in the UEFA Champions League with Panathinaikos, one of the powerhouses of Greek football, and was overall reasonably successful with the club, even though he failed to win the Greek championship. He performed well for Panathinaikos in the 2000–01 and 2001–2002 seasons, especially in Europe, including an outstanding match against Manchester United. Sypniewski later said that United player David Beckham, whom he nutmegged in the game, was average and that he had played against many better footballers in Greece. He also scored a goal against Arsenal which was at the time guarded by goalkeeper David Seaman.

Sypniewski broke his arm and his play progressively deteriorated; he left Panathinaikos soon after. He briefly appeared at OFI but he only made 10 appearances before the club released him.

In 1999 and 2001, Sypniewski made two appearances for the Poland national team; against New Zealand and Cameroon respectively.

=== Decline ===
Following his spell in Greece, Sypniewski had a short stint with top division side RKS Radomsko, scoring four goals in nine league games, before signing with Wisła Kraków in 2002, who at the time completely dominated Polish football. However, due to his frequent absenteeism and excessive drinking, he was loaned to Greek club Kallithea as Wisła did not want to terminate his contract initially, but in the end just several weeks after his initial transfer he was released by the club.

After signing with Swedish club Halmstad ahead of the 2003 Allsvenskan season, he established a reputation as a prolific forward by scoring nine goals in 13 appearances during the spring campaign. During this period of relative fitness, he declined call-ups to the Poland national team to prioritize his domestic club commitments.

His performance declined during the autumn portion of the season due to an unidentified illness, coinciding with Halmstad dropping from fourth to ninth place in the league table. Following his decision to sign a pre-contract agreement to join Malmö FF on a free transfer for the 2004 season., Halmstad suspended Sypniewski from participating in the final match of the 2003 campaign.

Along with Patrik Andersson and Afonso Alves, Sypniewski joined the Malmö team that had come close to winning the championship in successive years, and he was expected to play alongside Niklas Skoog, with Alves and central midfielder Tobias Grahn supplying the necessary passes. Following some unexpected problems in pre-season, while not wanting to practice properly on Malmö's camp in La Manga Club, Sypniewski hit back and scored twice in a 5–1 whitewash for Malmö at home against Örebro SK in front of over 20 thousand supporters. Following that game, Sypniewski started struggling with his form and temper, eventually going to such lengths that Malmö terminated his three-year contract after only six months. When Sypniewski departed, Afonso Alves moved up to a striking position, where he fired Malmö to the championship. Sypniewski was not given a medal due to not appearing in a sufficient number of games. He turned up at bottom side Trelleborgs FF in a desperate attempt to save the strugglers from relegation, but Sypniewski was completely out of shape and out of the club following a few matches.

Sypniewski returned to Poland and scored sixteen goals across a season-and-a-half at ŁKS. He then made a surprising return to Malmö to play with Bunkeflo in the third-tier division. Following a promising start with several goals and with rumours surfacing about interest from higher levels, Sypniewski managed to get into trouble once more, committing drunk driving in Malmö; he was sacked from Bunkeflo as a result and was forced to move back to Poland.

== Withdrawal from football and health issues ==
His former club ŁKS Łódź offered him a helping hand, but his personal problems continued.

Sypniewski made several attempts at getting back into football, but due to his addiction, he trialled with several clubs other than ŁKS, mostly local lower league teams until he eventually retired altogether.

Sypniewski re-appeared in 2007 when he went to watch ŁKS Łódź play Lech Poznań as a spectator in the stands. In a state of intoxication he, along with a group of ŁKS hooligans, attacked the Lech fans in the away sector. He was also later reported by a local woman to the police in Łódź who claimed that unprovoked, he was verbally abusive towards her and threw empty bottles at her. In 2008, he was jailed for a year and a half for domestic violence.

Sypniewski's semi-autobiography was published in November 2014 with the help of two local Łódź journalists, Żelisław Żyżyński and Paweł Hochstim. He continued attending ŁKS matches until the very end of his life.

Igor openly talked about his continued suffering from clinical depression, gambling addiction and alcoholism, stating that he frequently binge drank after taking strong anti-psychotic medication. He also had made a suicide attempt and suffered a stroke. Many of his colleagues attempted to help improve his health but to no avail.

== Death ==
According to Polish media, Sypniewski died overnight in the hospital on 4 November 2022, six days before his 48th birthday.

== Honours ==
Wisła Kraków

- Polish Cup: 2001–02

Malmö FF

- Allsvenskan: 2004
