= Panathinaikos F.C. in European football =

Greek club in European football

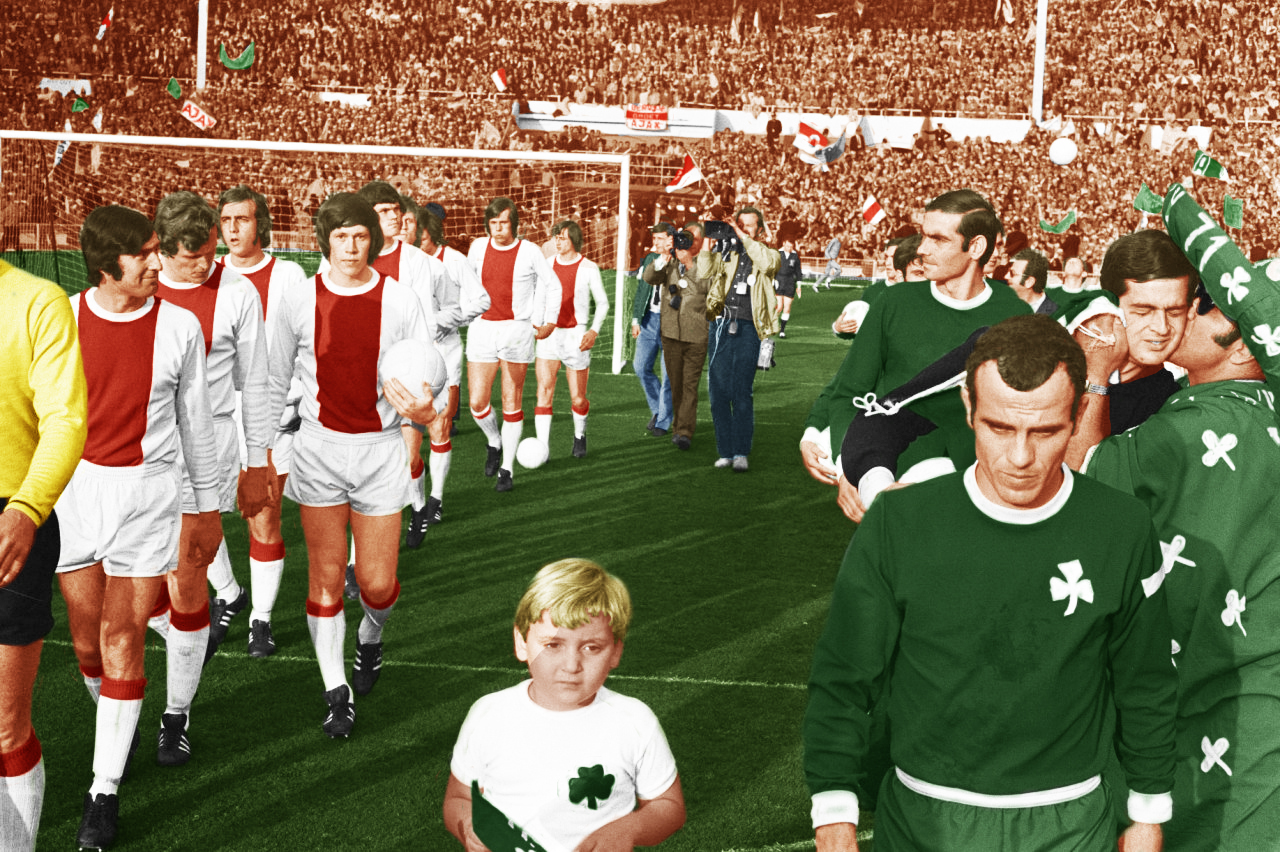
Panathinaikos (right) in the 1971 European Cup final against Ajax

== Achievements in Europe ==
Season	Achievement	Notes
European Cup / Champions League
1970–71	Final	lost to Ajax 0–2 in Wembley Stadium, London
1984–85	Semi-finals	eliminated by Liverpool 0–4 in Liverpool, 0–1 in Athens
1991–92	Quarter-finals	eliminated by Sampdoria, Red Star Belgrade, Anderlecht
1995–96	Semi-finals	eliminated by Ajax, 1–0 in Amsterdam, 0–3 in Athens
2001–02	Quarter-finals	eliminated by Barcelona, 1–0 in Athens, 1–3 in Barcelona
UEFA Cup / Europa League
1987–88	Quarter-finals	eliminated by Club Brugge 2–2 in Athens, 0–1 in Bruges
2002–03	Quarter-finals	eliminated by FC Porto 1–0 in Porto, 0–2 in Athens

== UEFA-organised seasonal competitions ==
=== European Cup/UEFA Champions League ===
Season	Round	Opposition	Home	Away	Aggregate
1960–61	Preliminary Round	Bye			
1960–61	First Round	(Czechoslovakia) Hradec Králové	0–0	0–1	0–1
1961–62	Preliminary Round	(Italy) Juventus	1–1	1–2	2–3
1962–63	Preliminary Round	(Poland) Polonia Bytom	1–4	1–2	2–6
1964–65	Preliminary Round	(Northern Ireland) Glentoran	3–2	2–2	5–4
1964–65	First Round	(Germany) 1. FC Köln	1–1	1–2	2–3
1965–66	Preliminary Round	(Malta) Sliema Wanderers	4–1	0–1	4–2
1965–66	First Round	(Hungary) Ferencváros	1–3	0–0	1–3
1969–70	First Round	(East Germany) Vorwärts Berlin	1–1	0–2	1–3
1970–71	First Round	(Luxembourg) Jeunesse Esch	5–0	2–1	7–1
1970–71	Second Round	(Czechoslovakia) Slovan Bratislava	3–0	1–2	4–2
1970–71	Quarter-finals	(England) Everton	0–0	1–1	1–1 (a)
1970–71	Semi-finals	(Socialist Federal Republic of Yugoslavia) Red Star Belgrade	3–0	1–4	4–4 (a)
1970–71	Final	(Netherlands) Ajax	0–2		
1972–73	First Round	(Bulgaria) CSKA Sofia	0–2	1–2	1–4
1977–78	First Round	(Malta) Floriana	4–0	1–1	5–1
1977–78	Second Round	(Belgium) Club Brugge	1–0	0–2	1–2
1984–85	First Round	(Netherlands) Feyenoord	2–1	0–0	2–1
1984–85	Second Round	(Northern Ireland) Linfield	2–1	3–3	5–4
1984–85	Quarter-finals	(Sweden) IFK Göteborg	2–2	1–0	3–2
1984–85	Semi-finals	(England) Liverpool	0–1	0–4	0–5
1986–87	First Round	(Socialist Federal Republic of Yugoslavia) Red Star Belgrade	2–1	0–3	2–4
1990–91	First Round	(Poland) Lech Poznań	1–2	0–3	1–5
1991–92	First Round	(Iceland) Fram Reykjavik	0–0	2–2	2–2 (a)
1991–92	Second Round	(Sweden) IFK Göteborg	2–0	2–2	4–2
1991–92	Group Stage	(Belgium) Anderlecht	0–0	0–0	4th
1991–92	Group Stage	(Italy) Sampdoria	0–0	1–1	4th
1991–92	Group Stage	(Socialist Federal Republic of Yugoslavia) Red Star Belgrade	0–2	0–1	4th
1995–96	Qualifying Round	(Croatia) Hajduk Split	0–0	1–1	1–1 (a)
1995–96	Group A	(Denmark) AaB	2–0	1–2	1st
1995–96	Group A	(France) Nantes	3–1	0–0	1st
1995–96	Group A	(Portugal) Porto	0–0	1–0	1st
1995–96	Quarter-finals	(Poland) Legia Warsaw	3–0	0–0	3–0
1995–96	Semi-finals	(Netherlands) Ajax	0–3	1–0	1–3
1996–97	Qualifying Round	(Norway) Rosenborg	1–0	0–3	1–3
1998–99	Second Qualifying Round	(Romania) Steaua București	6–3	2–2	8–5
1998–99	Group A	(Ukraine) Dynamo Kyiv	2–1	1–2	4th
1998–99	Group A	(England) Arsenal	1–3	1–2	4th
1998–99	Group A	(France) Lens	1–0	0–1	4th
2000–01	Third Qualifying Round	(Poland) Polonia Warsaw	2–1	2–2	4–3
2000–01	Group E	(Spain) Deportivo La Coruña	1–1	0–1	2nd
2000–01	Group E	(Italy) Juventus	3–1	1–2	2nd
2000–01	Group E	(Germany) Hamburger SV	0–0	1–0	2nd
2000–01	Group A	(England) Manchester United	1–1	1–3	4th
2000–01	Group A	(Spain) Valencia	0–0	1–2	4th
2000–01	Group A	(Austria) Sturm Graz	1–2	0–2	4th
2001–02	Third Qualifying Round	(Czech Republic) Slavia Prague	1–0	2–1	3–1
2001–02	Group C	(Germany) Schalke 04	2–0	2–0	1st
2001–02	Group C	(Spain) Mallorca	2–0	0–1	1st
2001–02	Group C	(England) Arsenal	1–0	1–2	1st
2001–02	Group C	(Portugal) Porto	0–0	1–2	2nd
2001–02	Group C	(Spain) Real Madrid	2–2	0–3	2nd
2001–02	Group C	(Czech Republic) Sparta Prague	2–1	2–0	2nd
2001–02	Quarter-finals	(Spain) Barcelona	1–0	1–3	2–3
2003–04	Group E	(England) Manchester United	0–1	0–5	3rd
2003–04	Group E	(Scotland) Rangers	1–1	3–1	3rd
2003–04	Group E	(Germany) VfB Stuttgart	1–3	0–2	3rd
2004–05	Group E	(Norway) Rosenborg	2–1	2–2	3rd
2004–05	Group E	(Netherlands) PSV Eindhoven	4–1	0–1	3rd
2004–05	Group E	(England) Arsenal	2–2	1–1	3rd
2005–06	Third Qualifying Round	(Poland) Wisła Kraków	4–1	1–3	5–4
2005–06	Group C	(Italy) Udinese	1–2	0–3	4th
2005–06	Group C	(Germany) Werder Bremen	2–1	1–5	4th
2005–06	Group C	(Spain) Barcelona	0–0	0–5	4th
2008–09	Second Qualifying Round	(Georgia (country)) Dinamo Tbilisi	3–0	0–0	3–0
2008–09	Third Qualifying Round	(Czech Republic) Sparta Prague	1–0	2–1	3–1
2008–09	Group B	(Italy) Inter Milan	0–2	1–0	1st
2008–09	Group B	(Cyprus) Anorthosis	1–0	1–3	1st
2008–09	Group B	(Germany) Werder Bremen	2–2	3–0	1st
2008–09	First Knockout Round	(Spain) Villarreal	1–2	1–1	2–3
2009–10	Third Qualifying Round	(Czech Republic) Sparta Prague	3–0	1–3	4–3
2009–10	Play Off Round	(Spain) Atlético Madrid	2–3	0–2	2–5
2010–11	Group D	(Spain) Barcelona	0–3	1–5	4th
2010–11	Group D	(Denmark) Copenhagen	0–2	1–3	4th
2010–11	Group D	(Russia) Rubin Kazan	0–0	0–0	4th
2011–12	Third Qualifying Round	(Denmark) Odense	3–4	1–1	4–5
2012–13	Third Qualifying Round	(Scotland) Motherwell	3–0	2–0	5–0
2012–13	Play Off Round	(Spain) Málaga	0–0	0–2	0–2
2014–15	Third Qualifying Round	(Belgium) Standard Liège	1–2	0–0	1–2
2015–16	Third Qualifying Round	(Belgium) Club Brugge	2–1	0–3	2–4
2023–24	Second Qualifying Round	(Ukraine) Dnipro-1	2–2	3–1	5−3
2023–24	Third Qualifying Round	(France) Marseille	1–0	1–2	2−2 (5–3 p)
2023–24	Play Off Round	(Portugal) Braga	0–1	1–2	1–3
2025–26	Second Qualifying Round	(Scotland) Rangers	1–1	0–2	1–3

=== European Cup Winners' Cup/UEFA Cup Winners' Cup ===
Season	Round	Opposition	Home	Away	Aggregate
1967–68	First Round	(Germany) Bayern Munich	1–2	0–5	1–7
1975–76	First Round	(East Germany) Zwickau	0–0	0–2	0–2
1982–83	First Round	Austria Wien	2–1	0–2	2–3
1988–89	First Round	(Cyprus) Omonia	2–0	1–0	3–0
1988–89	Second Round	(Bulgaria) CFKA Sredets Sofia	0–1	0–2	0–3
1989–90	First Round	(Wales) Swansea City	3–2	3–3	6–5
1989–90	Second Round	(Romania) Dinamo Bucharest	0–2	1–6	1–8
1993–94	First Round	(Republic of Ireland) Shelbourne	3–0	2–1	5–1
1993–94	Second Round	(Germany) Bayer Leverkusen	1–4	2–1	3–5
1994–95	First Round	(Bulgaria) Pirin Blagoevgrad	6–1	2–0	8–1
1994–95	Second Round	(Belgium) Club Brugge	0–0	0–1	0–1

=== UEFA Cup/UEFA Europa League ===
Season	Round	Opposition	Home	Away	Aggregate
1973–74	First Round	(Socialist Federal Republic of Yugoslavia) OFK Beograd	1–2	1–0	2–2 (a)
1974–75	First Round	(Switzerland) Grasshoppers	2–1	0–2	2–3
1978–79	First Round	(Romania) Argeş Piteşti	1–2	0–3	1–5
1980–81	First Round	(Italy) Juventus	4–2	0–4	4–6
1981–82	First Round	(England) Arsenal	0–2	0–1	0–3
1985–86	First Round	(Italy) Torino	1–1	1–2	2–3
1987–88	First Round	(France) Auxerre	2–0	2–3	4–3
1987–88	Second Round	(Italy) Juventus	1–0	2–3	3–3 (a)
1987–88	Third Round	(Hungary) Honvéd	5–1	2–5	7–6
1987–88	Quarter-finals	(Belgium) Club Brugge	2–2	0–1	2–3
1992–93	First Round	(Romania) Electroputere Craiova	4–0	6–0	10–0
1992–93	Second Round	(Italy) Juventus	0–1	0–0	0–1
1996–97	First Round	(Poland) Legia Warsaw	4–2	0–2	4–4 (a)
1999–2000	First Round	(Slovenia) Nova Gorica	2–0	1–0	3–0
1999–2000	Second Round	(Austria) Grazer AK	1–0	1–2	2–2 (a)
1999–2000	Third Round	(Spain) Deportivo La Coruña	1–1	2–4	3–5
2002–03	First Round	(Bulgaria) Litex Lovech	2–1	1–0	3–1
2002–03	Second Round	(Turkey) Fenerbahçe	4–1	1–1	5–2
2002–03	Third Round	(Czech Republic) Slovan Liberec	1–0	2–2	3–2
2002–03	Fourth Round	(Belgium) Anderlecht	3–0	0–2	3–2
2002–03	Quarter-finals	(Portugal) Porto	0–2	1–0	1–2
2003–04	Third Round	(France) Auxerre	0–1	0–0	0–1
2004–05	Third Round	(Spain) Sevilla	1–0	0–2	1–2
2006–07	First Round	(Ukraine) Metalurh Zaporizhya	1–1	1–0	2–1
2006–07	Group G	(Israel) Hapoel Tel Aviv	2–0	—N/a	1st
2006–07	Group G	(Czech Republic) Mladá Boleslav	—N/a	1–0	1st
2006–07	Group G	(Romania) Rapid Bucharest	0–0	—N/a	1st
2006–07	Group G	(France) Paris Saint-Germain	—N/a	0–4	1st
2006–07	Round of 32	(France) Lens	0–0	1–3	1–3
2007–08	First Round	(Slovakia) Artmedia Bratislava	3–0	2–1	5–1
2007–08	Group B	(Scotland) Aberdeen	3–0	—N/a	2nd
2007–08	Group B	(Denmark) Copenhagen	—N/a	1–0	2nd
2007–08	Group B	(Russia) Lokomotiv Moscow	2–0	—N/a	2nd
2007–08	Group B	(Spain) Atlético Madrid	—N/a	1–2	2nd
2007–08	Round of 32	(Scotland) Rangers	1–1	0–0	1–1 (a)
2009–10	Group F	(Turkey) Galatasaray	1–3	0–1	2nd
2009–10	Group F	(Romania) Dinamo Bucharest	3–0	1–0	2nd
2009–10	Group F	(Austria) Sturm Graz	1–0	1–0	2nd
2009–10	Round of 32	(Italy) Roma	3–2	3–2	6–4
2009–10	Round of 16	(Belgium) Standard Liège	1–3	0–1	1–4
2011–12	Play Off Round	(Israel) Maccabi Tel Aviv	2–1	0–3	2–4
2012–13	Group J	(Italy) Lazio	1–1	0–3	3rd
2012–13	Group J	(Slovenia) Maribor	1–0	0–3	3rd
2012–13	Group J	(England) Tottenham Hotspur	1–1	1–3	3rd
2014–15	Play Off Round	(Denmark) Midtjylland	4–1	2–1	6–2
2014–15	Group F	(Russia) Dynamo Moscow	1–2	1–2	4th
2014–15	Group F	(Portugal) Estoril	1–1	0–2	4th
2014–15	Group F	(Netherlands) PSV Eindhoven	2–3	1–1	4th
2015–16	Play Off Round	(Azerbaijan) Gabala	2–2	0–0	2–2 (a)
2016–17	Third Qualifying Round	(Sweden) AIK	1–0	2–0	3–0
2016–17	Play Off Round	(Denmark) Brøndby	3–0	1–1	4–1
2016–17	Group G	(Netherlands) Ajax	1–2	0–2	4th
2016–17	Group G	(Belgium) Standard Liège	0–3	2–2	4th
2016–17	Group G	(Spain) Celta Vigo	0–2	0–2	4th
2017–18	Third Qualifying Round	(Azerbaijan) Gabala	1–0	2–1	3–1
2017–18	Play Off Round	(Spain) Athletic Bilbao	2–3	0–1	2–4
2023–24	Group F	(Spain) Villarreal	2–0	2–3	4th
2023–24	Group F	(Israel) Maccabi Haifa	1–2	0–0	4th
2023–24	Group F	(France) Rennes	1–2	1–3	4th
2024–25	Second Qualifying Round	(Bulgaria) Botev Plovdiv	2–1	4–0	6–1
2024–25	Third Qualifying Round	(Netherlands) Ajax	0–1	1–0	1–1 (12–13 p)
2025–26	Third Qualifying Round	(Ukraine) Shakhtar Donetsk	0–0	0–0	0–0 (4–3 p)
2025–26	Play Off Round	(Turkey) Samsunspor	2–1	0–0	2–1
2025–26	League Phase	(Switzerland) Young Boys	—N/a	4–1	20th
2025–26	League Phase	(Netherlands) Go Ahead Eagles	1–2	—N/a	20th
2025–26	League Phase	(Netherlands) Feyenoord	—N/a	1–3	20th
2025–26	League Phase	(Sweden) Malmö FF	—N/a	1–0	20th
2025–26	League Phase	(Austria) Sturm Graz	2–1	—N/a	20th
2025–26	League Phase	(Czech Republic) Viktoria Plzeň	0–0	—N/a	20th
2025–26	League Phase	(Hungary) Ferencváros	—N/a	1–1	20th
2025–26	League Phase	(Italy) Roma	1–1	—N/a	20th
2025–26	Knockout phase play-offs	(Czech Republic) Viktoria Plzeň	2–2	1–1	3–3 (4–3 p)
2025–26	Round of 16	(Spain) Real Betis	1–0	0–4	1–4

=== UEFA Conference League ===
Season	Round	Opposition	Home	Away	Aggregate
2022–23	Third Qualifying Round	(Czech Republic) Slavia Prague	1–1	0–2	1–3
2024–25	Play-off Round	(France) Lens	2–0	1–2	3–2
2024–25	League Phase	(Bosnia and Herzegovina) Borac Banja Luka	—N/a	1–1	13th
2024–25	League Phase	(England) Chelsea	1–4	—N/a	13th
2024–25	League Phase	(Sweden) Djurgårdens IF	—N/a	1–2	13th
2024–25	League Phase	(Finland) HJK Helsinki	1–0	—N/a	13th
2024–25	League Phase	(Wales) The New Saints	—N/a	2–0	13th
2024–25	League Phase	(Belarus) Dinamo Minsk	4–0	—N/a	13th
2024–25	Knockout phase play-offs	(Iceland) Víkingur Reykjavík	2–0	1–2	3–2
2024–25	Round of 16	(Italy) Fiorentina	3–2	1–3	4–5
2026–27	Second qualifying round	(Hungary) Paks	2–2	2–1	4–3
2026–27	Third qualifying round	(Bulgaria) CSKA 1948	1–1	2–1	3–2
2026–27	Play-off Round	(Czech Republic) Hradec Králové	2–2	2–1	4–3
2026–27	League phase	(Bosnia and Herzegovina) Borac Banja Luka	2–1	—N/a	
2026–27	League phase	(Kazakhstan) Kairat	—N/a	5–1	
2026–27	League phase	(Bulgaria) CSKA Sofia	2–1	—N/a	
2026–27	League phase	(Denmark) Nordsjælland		—N/a	
2026–27	League phase	(Germany) SC Freiburg		—N/a	
2026–27	League phase	(England) Brighton & Hove Albion	—		

== UEFA-non organised seasonal competitions ==
=== Inter-Cities Fairs Cup ===
Season	Round	Opposition	Home	Away	Aggregate
1968–69	First Round	(Belgium) Daring	2–0	1–2	3–2
1968–69	Second Round	(Spain) Athletic Bilbao	0–0	0–1	0–1

== UEFA/CONMEBOL competitions ==
=== Intercontinental Cup ===
Season	Round	Opposition	Home	Away	Aggregate
1971	Final	(Uruguay) Nacional	1–1	1–2	2–3

== Record by competition ==
Panathinaikos F.C. record in European football by competition
Competition	Pld	W	D	L	GF	GA	GD	Win% (Note: Win% is rounded to two decimal places.)
UEFA Champions League / European Cup	165	51	47	67	191	225	−34	30.91
UEFA Cup Winners' Cup	22	9	3	10	29	36	−7	40.91
UEFA Europa League / UEFA Cup	130	51	29	50	164	163	+1	39.23
UEFA Conference League	23	12	5	6	41	30	+11	52.17
Inter-Cities Fairs Cup	4	1	1	2	3	3	+0	25.00
Intercontinental Cup	2	0	1	1	2	3	−1	0.00
Total	346	124	86	136	430	460	−30	35.84

Fully up to date as of match played 5 November 2026

== UEFA club ranking ==
=== UEFA ranking ===
Rank	Team	Country	Points
64	Red Star Belgrade	Serbia	31.500
65	Bologna	Italy	30.750
66	AEK Athens	Greece	30.500
67	Newcastle United	England	29.750
68	Panathinaikos	Greece	29.250

=== Recent rankings ===
Season	Rank	Points	Season	Rank	Points	Season	Rank	Points	Season	Rank	Points
2002–03	22	72.391	2007–08	37	52.525	2012–13	54	42.300	2017–18	157	7.000
2003–04	25	69.700	2008–09	27	56.633	2013–14	76	30.220	2018–19	158	7.000
2004–05	18	70.715	2009–10	29	56.979	2014–15	100	19.880	2019–20	212	5.260
2005–06	19	66.587	2010–11	32	57.833	2015–16	123	12.840	2020–21	241	5.200
2006–07	32	55.415	2011–12	40	50.920	2016–17	127	15.080	2021–22	218	5.640

== Record by club ==
Country	Panathinaikos vs	Total			
Country		Pld	W	D	L
Austria	Total	9	5	0	4
Austria	Sturm Graz	5	3	0	2
Austria	Austria Wien	2	1	0	1
Austria	Grazer AK	2	1	0	1
Azerbaijan	Total	4	2	2	0
Azerbaijan	Gabala	4	2	2	0
Belarus	Total	1	1	0	0
Belarus	Dinamo Minsk	1	1	0	0
Belgium	Total	20	4	6	10
Belgium	Club Brugge	8	2	2	4
Belgium	Anderlecht	4	1	2	1
Belgium	Standard Liège	6	0	2	4
Belgium	Daring	2	1	0	1
Bosnia and Herzegovina	Total	2	1	1	0
Bosnia and Herzegovina	Borac Banja Luka	2	1	1	0
Bulgaria	Total	13	8	1	4
Bulgaria	CSKA Sofia	5	1	0	4
Bulgaria	Pirin Blagoevgrad	2	2	0	0
Bulgaria	Litex Lovech	2	2	0	0
Bulgaria	Botev Plovdiv	2	2	0	0
Bulgaria	CSKA 1948	2	1	1	0
Croatia	Total	2	0	2	0
Croatia	Hajduk Split	2	0	2	0
Cyprus	Total	4	3	0	1
Cyprus	Anorthosis	2	1	0	1
Cyprus	Omonia	2	2	0	0
Czech Republic	Total	20	10	7	3
Czech Republic	Hradec Králové	4	1	2	1
Czech Republic	Mladá Boleslav	1	1	0	0
Czech Republic	Slavia Prague	4	2	1	1
Czech Republic	Slovan Liberec	2	1	1	0
Czech Republic	Sparta Prague	6	5	0	1
Czech Republic	Viktoria Plzeň	3	0	3	0
Denmark	Total	11	5	2	4
Denmark	AaB	2	1	0	1
Denmark	Copenhagen	3	1	0	2
Denmark	Odense	2	0	1	1
Denmark	Midtjylland	2	2	0	0
Denmark	Brøndby	2	1	1	0
England	Total	19	1	6	12
England	Arsenal	8	1	2	5
England	Chelsea	1	0	0	1
England	Everton	2	0	2	0
England	Liverpool	2	0	0	2
England	Manchester United	4	0	1	3
England	Tottenham Hotspur	2	0	1	1
Finland	Total	1	1	0	0
Finland	HJK	1	1	0	0
France	Total	17	5	3	9
France	Nantes	2	1	1	0
France	Lens	6	2	1	3
France	Marseille	2	1	0	1
France	Auxerre	4	1	1	2
France	Paris Saint-Germain	1	0	0	1
France	Rennes	2	0	0	2
Georgia	Total	2	1	1	0
Georgia	Dinamo Tbilisi	2	1	1	0
Germany	Total	20	6	5	9
Germany	1. FC Köln	2	0	1	1
Germany	Vorwärts Berlin	2	0	1	1
Germany	Hamburger SV	2	1	1	0
Germany	Schalke 04	2	2	0	0
Germany	VfB Stuttgart	2	0	0	2
Germany	Werder Bremen	4	2	1	1
Germany	Bayern Munich	2	0	0	2
Germany	Zwickau	2	0	1	1
Germany	Bayer Leverkusen	2	1	0	1
Hungary	Total	7	2	3	2
Hungary	Ferencváros	3	0	2	1
Hungary	Honvéd	2	1	0	1
Hungary	Paks	2	1	1	0
Iceland	Total	4	1	2	1
Iceland	Fram Reykjavik	2	0	2	0
Iceland	Víkingur Reykjavík	2	1	0	1
Ireland	Total	2	2	0	0
Ireland	Shelbourne	2	2	0	0
Israel	Total	5	2	1	2
Israel	Hapoel Tel Aviv	1	1	0	0
Israel	Maccabi Tel Aviv	2	1	0	1
Israel	Maccabi Haifa	2	0	1	1
Italy	Total	25	7	7	11
Italy	Fiorentina	2	1	0	1
Italy	Inter Milan	2	1	0	1
Italy	Juventus	10	3	2	5
Italy	Lazio	2	0	1	1
Italy	Roma	3	2	1	0
Italy	Sampdoria	2	0	2	0
Italy	Torino	2	0	1	1
Italy	Udinese	2	0	0	2
Kazakhstan	Total	1	1	0	0
Kazakhstan	FC Kairat	1	1	0	0
Luxembourg	Total	2	2	0	0
Luxembourg	Jeunesse Esch	2	2	0	0
Malta	Total	4	2	1	1
Malta	Sliema Wanderers	2	1	0	1
Malta	Floriana	2	1	1	0
Netherlands	Total	15	4	2	9
Netherlands	Ajax	7	2	0	5
Netherlands	Feyenoord	3	1	1	1
Netherlands	Go Ahead Eagles	1	0	0	1
Netherlands	PSV Eindhoven	4	1	1	2
Northern Ireland	Total	4	2	2	0
Northern Ireland	Glentoran	2	1	1	0
Northern Ireland	Linfield	2	1	1	0
Norway	Total	4	2	1	1
Norway	Rosenborg	4	2	1	1
Poland	Total	12	4	2	6
Poland	Polonia Bytom	2	0	0	2
Poland	Lech Poznań	2	0	0	2
Poland	Legia Warsaw	4	2	1	1
Poland	Polonia Warsaw	2	1	1	0
Poland	Wisła Kraków	2	1	0	1
Portugal	Total	10	2	3	5
Portugal	Porto	6	2	2	2
Portugal	Braga	2	0	0	2
Portugal	Estoril	2	0	1	1
Romania	Total	11	5	2	4
Romania	Steaua București	2	1	1	0
Romania	Dinamo Bucharest	4	2	0	2
Romania	Argeş Piteşti	2	0	0	2
Romania	Electroputere Craiova	2	2	0	0
Romania	Rapid Bucharest	1	0	1	0
Russia	Total	5	1	2	2
Russia	Rubin Kazan	2	0	2	0
Russia	Lokomotiv Moscow	1	1	0	0
Russia	Dynamo Moscow	2	0	0	2
Scotland	Total	9	4	4	1
Scotland	Rangers	6	1	4	1
Scotland	Motherwell	2	2	0	0
Scotland	Aberdeen	1	1	0	0
Serbia	Total	8	3	0	5
Serbia	Red Star Belgrade	6	2	0	4
Serbia	OFK Beograd	2	1	0	1
Slovakia	Total	4	3	0	1
Slovakia	Slovan Bratislava	2	1	0	1
Slovakia	Artmedia Bratislava	2	2	0	0
Slovenia	Total	4	3	0	1
Slovenia	Nova Gorica	2	2	0	0
Slovenia	Maribor	2	1	0	1
Spain	Total	35	5	8	22
Spain	Deportivo La Coruña	4	0	2	2
Spain	Valencia	2	0	1	1
Spain	Mallorca	2	1	0	1
Spain	Real Madrid	2	0	1	1
Spain	Barcelona	6	1	1	4
Spain	Villarreal	4	1	1	2
Spain	Atlético Madrid	3	0	0	3
Spain	Málaga	2	0	1	1
Spain	Sevilla	2	1	0	1
Spain	Celta Vigo	2	0	0	2
Spain	Athletic Bilbao	4	0	1	3
Spain	Real Betis	2	1	0	1
Sweden	Total	8	5	2	1
Sweden	AIK	2	2	0	0
Sweden	Djurgårdens IF	1	0	0	1
Sweden	IFK Göteborg	4	2	2	0
Sweden	Malmö FF	1	1	0	0
Switzerland	Total	3	2	0	1
Switzerland	Grasshoppers	2	1	0	1
Switzerland	Young Boys	1	1	0	0
Turkey	Total	6	2	2	2
Turkey	Fenerbahçe	2	1	1	0
Turkey	Galatasaray	2	0	0	2
Turkey	Samsunspor	2	1	1	0
Ukraine	Total	8	3	4	1
Ukraine	Dynamo Kyiv	2	1	0	1
Ukraine	Dnipro-1	2	1	1	0
Ukraine	Metalurh Zaporizhya	2	1	1	0
Ukraine	Shakhtar Donetsk	2	0	2	0
Wales	Total	3	2	1	0
Wales	Swansea City	2	1	1	0
Wales	The New Saints	1	1	0	0
