= Konstantinos Ipirotis =

Greek footballer

Personal information
- Full name: Konstantinos Ipirotis
- Date of birth: 5 December 1975 (age 50)
- Place of birth: Frankfurt, West Germany
- Height: 1.79 m (5 ft 10 in)
- Position: Midfielder

Youth career
- 1992-1994: Aris

Senior career*
Years	Team	Apps	(Gls)
1994-1996	Aris	4	(0)
1998–1999	Panserraikos	68	(15)
1999–2000	Panathinaikos	2	(0)
2000–2002	OFI	18	(1)
2002	Panserraikos		
2002	Fostiras		
2003–2004	Ethnikos Asteras		
2004–2005	ILTEX Lykoi		
2005–2006	APOP Kinyras Peyias		
2006–2009	PAO Diikitirio		
- * Club domestic league appearances and goals

Konstantinos Ipirotis (Greek: Κωνσταντίνος Ηπειρώτης; born 5 December 1975) is a Greek retired football midfielder.
