= Vangelis Koutsoures =

Greek footballer

Personal information
- Full name: Evangelos Koutsoures
- Date of birth: 2 February 1975 (age 51)
- Place of birth: Portaria Chalkidikis, Greece
- Height: 1.81 m (5 ft 11 in)
- Position: Attacking midfielder

Team information
- Current team: Erani Filiatra

Senior career*
Years	Team	Apps	(Gls)
1993–1996	Edessaikos	48	(3)
1996–2000	Kalamata	100	(12)
2000–2001	Panathinaikos	17	(1)
2001–2003	Iraklis	45	(4)
2003–2005	OFI	49	(1)
2005–2007	Kerkyra	31	(2)
2007–2009	Panetolikos	56	(1)
2009–2010	Eordaikos		
2010–2011	Erani Filiatra		
- * Club domestic league appearances and goals

Vangelis Koutsoures (Greek: Βαγγέλης Κουτσουρές; born on 2 February 1975) is a Greek football player who currently plays for Erani Filiatra. Koutsoures played for Panathinaikos, OFI and Kerkyra in the Super League Greece.
