= Kostas Kiassos =

Greek footballer

Personal information
- Full name: Konstantinos Panteleimon Kiassos
- Date of birth: 13 December 1975 (age 50)
- Place of birth: Chania, Greece
- Height: 1.75 m (5 ft 9 in)
- Position: Midfielder

Team information
- Current team: Apollon Paralimnio (manager)

Senior career*
Years	Team	Apps	(Gls)
1993–1998	OFI		
1998–2001	Panathinaikos		
2001–2003	OFI		
2003–2004	Iraklis	28	(3)
2004–2005	Numancia	3	(0)
2005–2006	Panionios	17	(2)
2006	Anorthosis Famagusta		
2006–2007	Levadiakos		
2007–2008	PAS Giannina		
2008–2009	Levadiakos	24	(2)
2009–2011	OFI	26	(2)
2011	Enosis Neon Paralimni	8	(0)
2011–2013	Panserraikos	29	(0)
2013	Apollon Smyrni	15	(0)
2013–2014	Panachaiki	21	(0)
2014–2015	Welling United	1	(0)
2015–2017	OFI	21	(0)

Managerial career
- 2019: Agios Nikolaos
- 2023–: Apollon Paralimnio
- * Club domestic league appearances and goals

Konstantinos Panteleimon Kiassos (Greek: Κώστας Κιάσσος; born 13 December 1975) is a Greek former professional footballer who mainly played for OFI, as a midfielder.

== Playing career ==
Born in Chania, Kiassos has played for OFI, Panathinaikos, Iraklis, Numancia, Panionios, Anorthosis Famagusta, Levadiakos, PAS Giannina, Enosis Neon Paralimni, Panserraikos, Apollon Smyrni, Panachaiki and Welling United.

== Managerial career ==
In 2019 he managed Agios Nikolaos.

In 2023 he became manager of Apollon Paralimnio.
