= Bledar Kola =

Albanian footballer

Personal information
- Full name: Christoforos Bledar Kola
- Date of birth: 1 August 1972 (age 54)
- Place of birth: Mirditë, Albania
- Height: 1.82 m (6 ft 0 in)
- Position: Midfielder

Youth career
- Besëlidhja

Senior career*
Years	Team	Apps	(Gls)
1988–1989	Besëlidhja		
1989–1990	Partizani	35	(6)
1990–1991	Elbasani	21	(1)
1991–1994	Panargiakos	77	(13)
1994–1996	Apollon Smyrnis	63	(10)
1996–2000	Panathinaikos	106	(10)
2001–2002	AEK Athens	11	(0)
2002–2003	Kallithea	16	(1)
2003–2004	Apollon Smyrnis	19	(2)
Total		348	(43)

International career
1990–2001	Albania	39	(6)

Managerial career
- 2004–2011: AEK Athens (youth)
- 2010: AEK Athens (interim)
- 2012: Apollon Smyrnis
- 2013: Omonia (assistant)
- 2014: Panargiakos
- 2014–2016: Panionios (assistant)
- 2016–2018: Panathinaikos (assistant)
- 2018–2019: AEK Athens (assistant)
- 2020: APOEL (assistant)
- 2021: Universitatea Craiova (assistant)
- * Club domestic league appearances and goals

Bledar Kola (born 1 August 1972) is an Albanian retired football player and later manager.

== Early life ==
Kola comes from Mirditë, but grew up in the city of Lezhë. He was an exemplary student. He started his career at Besëlidhja Lezhë, and then moved to Partizani Tirana. Later he moved to Greece where his playing career took off.

== Club career ==
Kola started his career at Besëlidhja and in 1988 he was promoted to the first team. In 1989 he moved to Partizani and in the following season he played for Elbasani. In the summer of 1991 Kola took part in the Mediterranean Games with Albania in Greece caught the eye of the manager of Panargiakos, Angelos Anastasiadis. Thus he was acquired by the Greek club, where he played for 3 seasons. In 1994 he joined Apollon Athens and he helped the team with his performances qualify for the UEFA Cup in 1995 and the Cup final in 1996.

In the summer of 1996 he made the big step of his career and was transferred to Panathinaikos, where he played for 4.5 seasons. In November 2001, he became Greek, was baptized an Orthodox Christian and took the name "Christophoros". On 19 January 2001 he moved to rivals, AEK Athens. During his spell at the club he won the Cup in 2002. On 7 July 2002 his contract with was terminated and he signed for Kallithea. In January 2003, Kola was released by Kallithea after failing a doping test. Afterwards he returned to Apollon, where he finished his career in 2004.

== International career ==
He made his debut for Albania in a December 1990 European Championship qualification match away against Spain and earned a total of 39 caps, scoring 6 goals. His final international was a March 2001 FIFA World Cup qualification against England in Tirana.

=== National team statistics ===
Albania national team
Year	Apps	Goals
1990	1	0
1991	1	0
1992	1	0
1993	0	0
1994	4	0
1995	3	0
1996	4	0
1997	5	2
1998	7	2
1999	6	1
2000	5	0
2001	2	1
Total	39	6

=== International goals ===
Scores and results list Albania's goal tally first, score column indicates score after each Kola goal.

List of international goals scored by Marinos Ouzounidis
No.	Date	Venue	Opponent	Score	Result	Competition
1	2 April 1997	Nuevo Estadio de Los Cármenes, Granada, Spain	Germany	1–0	2–3	1998 FIFA World Cup qualification
2	2 April 1997	Nuevo Estadio de Los Cármenes, Granada, Spain	Germany	2–3	2–3	1998 FIFA World Cup qualification
3	10 February 1999	Ta' Qali National Stadium, Ta' Qali, Malta	Latvia	1–1	2–2	Friendly
4	10 February 1999	Ta' Qali National Stadium, Ta' Qali, Malta	Latvia	2–1	2–2	Friendly
5	9 October 1999	Qemal Stafa Stadium, Tirana, Albania	Georgia	2–0	2–1	UEFA Euro 2000 qualifying
6	24 March 2001	BayArena, Leverkusen, Germany	Germany	1–1	1–2	2002 FIFA World Cup qualifier

== Managerial career ==
Kola took temporary charge at AEK Athens in August 2010 and was named full-time manager of Apollon Smyrnis in July 2012. He also coached Panargiakos and from 2014 was the assistant of Marinos Ouzounidis at Panionios, Panathinaikos and AEK Athens, respectively, until 2019.

== Honours ==
AEK Athens

- Greek Cup: 2001–02
