= Fernando Galetto =

Argentine footballer

Personal information
- Full name: Fernando Edgar Galetto
- Date of birth: April 13, 1971 (age 55)
- Place of birth: Monte Cristo, Córdoba, Argentina
- Height: 1.87 m (6 ft 2 in)
- Position: Defensive midfielder

Senior career*
Years	Team	Apps	(Gls)
1990–1992	Racing Córdoba		
1992–1993	Talleres de Córdoba	37	(0)
1993–1994	Club Atlético Lanús	33	(1)
1994–1999	San Lorenzo	148	(2)
1999–2002	Panathinaikos	50	(2)
2002–2003	Club Atlético Lanús	7	(0)
2004–2005	Racing Córdoba	15	(0)

International career
1995	Argentina	1	(0)
- * Club domestic league appearances and goals

Fernando Edgar Galetto (born 13 April 1971 in Monte Cristo, Córdoba) is a former Argentine footballer.

== Career ==
He began his career playing for Racing de Córdoba before moving to Talleres at age 21 in 1992. A few months later, he joined Lanús before moving to San Lorenzo de Almagro, where was part of the team that won the 1995 Torneo Clausura. During this time Galetto also made one appearance for the Argentina national team in 1995. In 1999, he joined Panathinaikos, where he played for three years and scored his 2 goals against Olympiacos and Deportivo la Coruña. After his return from Greece, he played for Lanús for one season and Racing de Córdoba for another before retiring.

== Personal ==
He is married to María José Galíndez and has three children.
