= 2016–17 PAOK FC season =

PAOK FC
2016–17 season
- President: Ivan Savvidis
- Manager: Vladimir Ivic
- Stadium: Toumba Stadium
- Super League: 2nd; 4th after play-offs
- Greek Cup: Winners
- UEFA Champions League: Third qualifying round
- UEFA Europa League: Round of 32
- Top goalscorer: League: Aleksandar Prijović (7); All: Aleksandar Prijović (10)
- Highest home attendance: 26,379 (vs Olympiacos)
- Lowest home attendance: 2,906 (vs PAS Giannina)
- Average home league attendance: 11,916
Home colours	Away colours	Third colours

The 2016–17 season was PAOK Football Club's 91st in existence and the club's 58th consecutive season in the top flight of Greek football. The team entered the Greek Football Cup and will also compete in UEFA Champions League starting from the third qualifying round.

== Club ==
=== Board of directors ===
Position	Name
Owner	(Russia) (Greece) Ivan Savvidis
President	(Russia) (Greece) Ivan Savvidis
Vice–President & CEO	(Greece) Chrisostomos Gagatsis
Director of Football	(Slovakia) Ľuboš Micheľ
Member of the Board	(Russia) (Greece) Giorgos Savvidis
Member of the Board	(Russia) Maria Goncharova
Member of the Board	(Russia) Artur Davidyan
Member of the Board	(Greece) Dimokratis Papadopoulos
Member of the Board	(Greece) Ilias Gerontidis
Consultant of Football	(Greece) Giorgos Koudas

=== Coaching staff (Technical & Medical) ===
Position	Staff
Head Coach	(Serbia) Vladimir Ivic
Assistant manager	(Serbia) Miloš Veselinović
Assistant manager	(Poland) Mirosław Sznaucner
Team Manager	(Greece) Pantelis Konstantinidis
Goalkeeping coach	(Greece) Christos Kelpekis
Head Gymnast Rehabilitation	(Serbia) Petar Milčanović
Gymnast Rehabilitation	(Greece) Vasilios Kanaras
Data Analyst (Vis-Track)	(Greece) Kyriakos Tsitsiridis
Opponent Analysis	(Greece) Grigoris Kavalieratos
Head of Medical Services	(Greece) Emmanouil Papakostas
Club's Doctor	(Greece) Kostas Tziantzis
Exercise Physiology	(Greece) Giorgos Ziogas
Nutritionist	(Greece) Ioanna Paspala
Head Physiotherapist	(Serbia) Nenad Kovačević
Physiotherapist	(Greece) Petros Nikolakoudis
Physiotherapist	(Greece) Nikolaos Tsirelas
Physiotherapist	(Greece) Athanasios Kapoulas
Physiotherapist	(Greece) Nikolaos Gagalis
Physiotherapist	(Greece) Nikolaos Mouratidis
Head of academy	(Greece) Vangelis Pourliotopoulos

Last updated: 3 February 2017
Source: PAOK F.C.

== Players ==
=== Squad information ===
N	Pos.	Nat.	Name	Age	EU	Since	App	Goals	Ends	Transfer fee	Notes
3	RWB	(Brazil)	Léo Matos	40	Non-EU	2016	47	7	2019		
4	LWB	(Croatia)	Marin Leovac (Vice-captain)	37	EU	2015	79	3	2019	€1.3M	
5	CB	(Greece)	Dimitris Chatziisaias	33	EU	2016	9	1	2019	€0.55M	
7	CM	(Egypt)	Amr Warda	32	Non-EU	2017	14	1	2020	€0.35M	
8	CM	(Greece)	Charis Charisis	31	EU	2015	41	2	2019	€0.48M	
9	CF	(Switzerland)	Aleksandar Prijović	36	EU	2017	20	10	2021	€1.9M	
10	FW	(Angola)	Djalma Campos	39	EU	2016	44	5	2019		Second nationality: Portugal
11	FW	(Brazil)	Pedro Henrique Konzen	35	Non-EU	2017	21	4	2020	€1.65M	
13	CB	(Greece)	Stelios Malezas (Vice-captain)	41	EU	2005/2015	220	4	2018	€0.10M	
15	CB	(Spain)	José Ángel Crespo	39	EU	2016	48	1	2019		
16	CM	(Bosnia and Herzegovina)	Gojko Cimirot	33	EU	2015	74	1	2019	€1.3M	
20	CF	(Greece)	Efthimis Koulouris	30	EU	2009	62	9	2018	PAOK U20	
21	FW	(Suriname)	Diego Biseswar	38	EU	2016	44	6	2019		
23	GK	(Serbia)	Željko Brkić	39	EU	2016	11	0	2019		
26	DM	(Albania)	Ergys Kaçe	32	EU	2005	152	7	2020	PAOK U20	
27	FW	(Greece)	Giannis Mystakidis	31	EU	2015	61	11	2020		
28	CM	(Ukraine)	Yevhen Shakhov	35	Non-EU	2016	44	8	2019		
33	CF	(Greece)	Stefanos Athanasiadis (Captain)	37	EU	2007	292	106	2018	PAOK U20	
41	RWB	(Greece)	Panagiotis Deligiannidis	29	EU	2012	7	1	2020	PAOK U20	
43	CB	(Cape Verde)	Fernando Varela	38	EU	2016	39	1	2019	€1.4M	Second nationality: Portugal
44	CB	(Greece)	Achilleas Poungouras	30	EU	2012	10	0	2019	PAOK U20	
70	RB	(Greece)	Stelios Kitsiou	32	EU	2007	146	5	2018	PAOK U20	
71	GK	(Greece)	Panagiotis Glykos (Vice-captain)	39	EU	2007	165	0	2019		
77	FW	(Greece)	Dimitrios Pelkas	32	EU	2007	90	17	2018	PAOK U20	
87	DM	(Spain)	José Cañas	39	EU	2016	42	1	2019		
99	GK	(Greece)	Marios Siampanis	26	EU	2015	2	0	2019	PAOK U20	

- Last updated: 2 June 2017
- Source: paokfc.gr, 2016/17 numbers, Players in / out, Wikipedia players' articles, and paokfc.gr (for appearances and goals)

=== Players in ===
No.	Pos.	Nat.	Name	Age	EU	Moving from	Type	Transfer window	Ends	Transfer fee	Source
43	DF	(Cape Verde)	Fernando Varela	38	EU	(Romania) Steaua București	Transfer	Summer	2019	1.40M€	
10	FW	(Angola)	Djalma Campos	39	EU	(Turkey) Gençlerbirliği S.K.	Free	Summer	2019	Free	
21	MF	(Netherlands)	Diego Biseswar	38	EU	(Turkey) Kayserispor	Free	Summer	2019	Free	
87	MF	(Spain)	José Cañas	39	EU	(Spain) Espanyol	Free	Summer	2019	Free	
3	DF	(Brazil)	Léo Matos	40	Non-EU	(Ukraine) Dnipro	Free	Summer	2019	Free	
28	MF	(Ukraine)	Yevhen Shakhov	35	Non-EU	(Ukraine) Dnipro	Free	Summer	2019	Free	
15	DF	(Spain)	José Ángel Crespo	39	EU	(England) Aston Villa	Free	Summer	2019	Free	
23	GK	(Serbia)	Željko Brkić	39	EU	(Italy) Udinese	Free	Summer	2019	Free	
7	FW	(Senegal)	Mame Baba Thiam	33	Non-EU	(Italy) Juventus	Loan	Summer	2017	Free	
14	FW	(Argentina)	Facundo Pereyra	38	Non-EU	(Argentina) Racing Club	Loan return	Summer	2018	Free	
20	FW	(Greece)	Efthimis Koulouris	30	EU	(Cyprus) Anorthosis	Loan return	Summer	2018	Free	
18	DF	(Greece)	Dimitris Giannoulis	29	EU	(Cyprus) Anorthosis	Loan return	Summer	2020	Free	
36	FW	(Greece)	Lazaros Lamprou	28	EU	(Greece) Iraklis	Transfer	Winter	2020	0.30M€	
9	FW	(Switzerland)	Aleksandar Prijović	36	EU	(Poland) Legia Warsaw	Transfer	Winter	2021	1.90M€	
7	MF	(Egypt)	Amr Warda	32	EU	(Greece) Panetolikos	Transfer	Winter	2020	0.35M€	
26	MF	(Albania)	Ergys Kaçe	32	EU	(Czech Republic) Viktoria Plzeň	Loan return	Winter	2020	Free	
11	FW	(Brazil)	Pedro Henrique Konzen	35	Non-EU	(France) Stade Rennais F.C.	Transfer	Winter	2021	1.65M€	

Total spending: ▼€5.60M

=== Players out ===
No.	Pos.	Nat.	Name	Age	EU	Moving to	Type	Transfer window	Transfer fee	Source
11	FW	(Slovakia)	Róbert Mak	35		(Russia) FC Zenit	Transfer	Summer	3.5M€	
25	GK	(Sweden)	Robin Olsen	36		(Denmark) F.C. Copenhagen	Transfer	Summer	0.7M€	
10	FW	(Spain)	Lucas Pérez^{1}	37		(England) Arsenal	Transfer	Summer	6M€	goal.com
15	DF	(Portugal)	Miguel Vítor	36		(Israel) Hapoel Be'er Sheva F.C.	Free	Summer	Free	
7	MF	(Israel)	Eyal Golasa	34		(Israel) Maccabi Tel Aviv	Free	Summer	Free	
10	FW	(Bulgaria)	Dimitar Berbatov	45			Free	Summer	Free	
88	MF	(Greece)	Kyriakos Savvidis	30		(Greece) Panionios	Free	Summer	Free	
26	MF	(Albania)	Ergys Kaçe	32		(Czech Republic) FC Viktoria Plzeň	Loan	Summer	Free	
52	MF	(Slovakia)	Erik Sabo	34		(Israel) Beitar Jerusalem F.C.	Loan	Summer	Free	
93	MF	(Australia)	Terry Antonis	32		(Greece) Veria F.C.	Loan	Summer	Free	
22	DF	(Greece)	Dimitris Konstantinidis	32		(Cyprus) AC Omonia	Loan	Summer	Free	
9	FW	(Brazil)	Jairo	34	Non-EU	(Greece) PAS Giannina	Loan	Summer	Free	
19	FW	(Greece)	Vasilis Papadopoulos	30		(Cyprus) Karmiotissa	Loan	Summer	Free	
96	FW	(Greece)	Stelios Pozoglou	30		(Cyprus) Karmiotissa	Loan	Summer	Free	
37	DF	(Albania)	Kristi Qose	31		(Slovakia) MFK Zemplín Michalovce	Loan	Summer	Free	
66	FW	(Albania)	Kristian Kushta	28		(Slovakia) MFK Zemplín Michalovce	Loan	Summer	Free	
30	GK	(Greece)	Nikos Melissas	33		(Greece) Sparta F.C.	Loan	Summer	Free	
24	FW	(Portugal)	Garry Rodrigues	35		(Turkey) Galatasaray	Transfer	Winter	3.5M€	KAP.gov.tr
18	DF	(Greece)	Dimitris Giannoulis	29		(Cyprus) Anorthosis	Loan	Winter	Free	
93	MF	(Australia)	Terry Antonis	32		(Australia) Western Sydney Wanderers	Loan	Winter	Free	
7	FW	(Senegal)	Mame Baba Thiam	33	Non-EU	(Italy) Juventus	End of Loan	Winter	Free	
31	DF	(Greece)	Georgios Tzavellas	38		(Turkey) Alanyaspor	Contract termination	Winter	Free	
2	DF	(Greece)	Giannis Skondras	36			Contract termination	Winter	Free	
14	FW	(Argentina)	Facundo Pereyra	38	Non-EU	(Argentina) Colón Santa Fe	Loan	Winter	Free	
6	MF	(Greece)	Alexandros Tziolis	41			Contract termination	Winter	Free	
19	FW	(Greece)	Vasilis Papadopoulos	31		(Greece) Trikala F.C.	Loan	Winter	Free	
23	MF	(Greece)	Anastasios Dimitriadis	28		(Slovakia) MFK Zemplín Michalovce	Loan	Winter	Free	
11	FW	(Greece)	Lazaros Lamprou	28		(Greece) Panionios F.C.	Loan	Winter	Free	
34	MF	(Greece)	Nikos Korovesis	34		(Greece) PAS Giannina	Loan	Winter	Free	
1	GK	(Greece)	Markos Vellidis	39			Contract termination	Winter	Free	

^{1}PAOK will receive €6m from the transfer fee due to a sell-on clause included in the deal which took Perez from Thessaloniki to La Coruna

▲ Total Income: €13.7M

Net income: ▲€8.1M

== Kit ==
Supplier: Macron
Sponsor(s): Sportingbet

Home	Home alt	Away	Third

Source: OlimpoPress

== Friendlies ==
All times at CET

6 July 2016 Friendly	Silvolde SC	0–14	PAOK	Oosterbeek, Netherlands
18:00		Report	2', 42' Koulouris; 5', 31', 33' Pereyra; 26'Korovesis; 56', 63' Shakhov; 59', 66', 89' Pelkas; 75', 88' Athanasiadis

9 July 2016 Friendly	Club Brugge	0–2	PAOK	Garderen, Netherlands
18:00		Report	70' Koulouris; 80' Pelkas

13 July 2016 Friendly	Steaua București	4–3	PAOK	Arnhem, netherlands
17:00	23' Enache; 37' Stanciu; 38', 45' Tudorie	Report	3' Koulouris; 28' (o.g.) Cojocaru; 32' Rodrigues

16 July 2016 Friendly	Twente	0–2	PAOK
15:00		Report	77' Shakhov; 81' Djalma

21 July 2016 Friendly	PAOK	1–1	Apollon Limassol	Salonika, Greece
19:30	90' Tziolis	Report	85' Piech	Stadium: Toumba Stadium

9 August 2016 Friendly	PAOK	3–0	Veria	Salonika, Greece
20:00	29', 35' Pereyra; 63' Biseswar	Report		Stadium: Toumba Stadium

10 August 2016 Friendly	Atromitos	0–1	PAOK	Athens, Greece
20:15		Report	87' Athanasiadis	Stadium: Peristeri Stadium

20 August 2016 Friendly	Xanthi	0–0	PAOK	Xanthi, Greece
19:00		Report		Stadium: Xanthi FC Arena

== Competitions ==
=== Overview ===
Competition	Record							
Competition	Pld	W	D	L	GF	GA	GD	Win %
Super League Greece	30	20	4	6	52	19	+33	66.67
Greek Cup	10	7	1	2	23	6	+17	70.00
UEFA play-offs	6	3	0	3	7	5	+2	50.00
UEFA Europa League	10	5	2	3	13	10	+3	50.00
UEFA Champions League	2	0	1	1	2	3	−1	0.00
Total	58	35	8	15	97	43	+54	60.34

Last updated: 2 June 2017.
Source: Competitions

=== Super League Greece ===
==== League table ====
Pos	Team	Pld	W	D	L	GF	GA	GD	Pts	Qualification or relegation
1	Olympiacos (C)	30	21	4	5	57	16	+41	67	Qualification for the Champions League third qualifying round
2	PAOK (Note: PAOK were deducted three points as they did not show up to the second semi-final match against Olympiacos in last year's Greek Cup.)	30	20	4	6	52	19	+33	61	Qualification for the Play-offs
3	Panathinaikos	30	16	9	5	45	19	+26	57	Qualification for the Play-offs
4	AEK Athens	30	14	11	5	54	23	+31	53	Qualification for the Play-offs
5	Panionios	30	15	7	8	35	23	+12	52	Qualification for the Play-offs

Source: Super League Greece
Rules for classification: 1) Points; 2) Head-to-head points; 3) Head-to-head goal difference; 4) Goals scored; 5) Goals against; 6) Play-offs (neutral ground); 7) Draw.
(Note: Criteria 6 is only used if needed to decide champion, teams for relegation or teams for UEFA competitions).
(C) Champions

==== Results summary ====
Overall								Home						Away					
Pld	W	D	L	GF	GA	GD	Pts	W	D	L	GF	GA	GD	W	D	L	GF	GA	GD
30	20	4	6	52	19	+33	64	12	1	2	33	9	+24	8	3	4	19	10	+9

Last updated: 30 April 2017.
Source: Competitive matches

==== Results by round ====
Round	1	2	3	4	5	6	7	8	9	10	11	12	13	14	15	16	17	18	19	20	21	22	23	24	25	26	27	28	29	30
Ground	H	A	H	A	H	A	H	A	H	A	H	A	A	H	H	A	A	A	H	A	H	A	H	A	H	H	A	H	A	H
Result	W	W	D	D	W	L	W	L	L	L	W	W	W	L	W	W	W	W	W	D	W	D	W	L	W	W	W	W	W	W
Position	9	6	6	7	5	7	4	6	9	11	9	8	6	8	9	6	5	3	3	3	3	3	3	3	3	3	2	2	2	2

Source: League matches
A = Away; H = Home; W = Win; D = Draw; L = Loss

==== Matches ====
Win Draw Loss

11 September 2016 3	PAOK	2–1	Panetolikos	Thessaloniki
18:15 EET	Biseswar 1'; Rodrigues 27'; José Cañas (yellow card) 90+2'	Club report Superleague report UEFA report	(yellow card) 80' Fabián Muñoz; 90+1' Warda	Stadium: Toumba Stadium; Attendance: 11,515; Referee: Evangelos Kiotzenis

19 September 2016 4	Asteras Tripolis	1–2	PAOK	Tripoli
19:30 EET	Bertos (yellow card) 9' (yellow-red card) 45'; Ioannidis 62'	Club report Superleague report UEFA report	(yellow card) 9' Tzavellas; 22', 24' Koulouris; (yellow card) 29' Crespo; (yellow card) 62' Varela; (yellow card) 73' Rodrigues	Stadium: Theodoros Kolokotronis Stadium; Attendance: 1,960; Referee: Alexandros Aretopoulos

25 September 2016 5	PAOK	0–0	Xanthi	Thessaloniki
16:00 EET	Djalma Campos (yellow card) 35'	Club report Superleague report UEFA report	(yellow card) 31' (yellow-red card) 69' Đorđe Lazić; (yellow card) 39' Camara; (yellow card) 55' Pablo de Lucas; (yellow card) 87' Dani Nieto; (yellow card) 90+5' Okan Hatziterzoglu	Stadium: Toumba Stadium; Attendance: 13,132; Referee: Aristidis Vatsios

2 October 2016 6	Veria	0–0	PAOK	Veria
16:00 EET	Pedro Arce (yellow card) 52'	Club report Superleague report UEFA report	(yellow card) 47' Athanasiadis; (yellow card) 78' Gojko Cimirot	Stadium: Veria Stadium; Attendance: 3,583; Referee: Aggelos Evangelou

16 October 2016 7	PAOK	1–0	Iraklis	Thessaloniki
20:30 EET	Rodrigues 3'; Yevhen Shakhov (yellow card) 18'; Djalma Campos (yellow card) 44'; Stelios Malezas (yellow card) 44'	Club report Superleague report UEFA report	(yellow card) 22' (yellow-red card) 27' Saramantas; (yellow card) 44' Intzoglou; (yellow card) 44' Huanderson; (yellow card) 81' Kyriakidis	Stadium: Toumba Stadium; Attendance: 14,240; Referee: Georgios Kizas

23 October 2016 8	Olympiacos	2–1	PAOK	Piraeus
20:30 EET	Varela 25' (o.g.); Viana (yellow card) 42'; Figueiras (yellow card) 45'; Milivojević (yellow card) 45' (goal) 90+6'; Botía (yellow card) 88'	Club report Superleague report UEFA report	6' Varela; (yellow card) 32' José Cañas; (yellow card) 45' Rodrigues	Stadium: Karaiskakis Stadium; Attendance: 24,727; Referee: Alexandros Aretopoulos

30 October 2016 9	PAOK	1–0	AEK Athens	Thessaloniki
19.30 EET	Djalma Campos (yellow card) 17'; Matos 90+4'	Club report Superleague report UEFA report	(yellow card) 28' Kolovetsios	Stadium: Toumba Stadium; Attendance: 18,741; Referee: Anastasios Sidiropoulos

6 November 2016 10	Panionios	1–0	PAOK	Nea Smyrni, Athens
17:15 EET	Ansarifard 14' (yellow card) 41'; Masouras (yellow card) 54'; Ben (yellow card) 69'; Vlachos (yellow card) 90+1'; Risvanis (yellow card) 90+2'	Club report Superleague report UEFA report	(yellow card) 31' Matos; (yellow card) 52' Crespo; (yellow card) 61' Malezas	Stadium: Nea Smyrni Stadium; Attendance: 2,428; Referee: Georgios Kizas

28 November 2016 12	PAOK	3–4	Atromitos	Thessaloniki
19:30 EET	Rodrigues 3'; Tzavellas (yellow card) 11'; Matos (yellow card) 21'; Koulouris 26'; Mystakidis 69'; Cañas (red card) 73'	Club report Superleague report UEFA report	(yellow card) 31' Kivrakidis; 56' Le Tallec; 74' Umbides; 86' Papadopoulos; 90+3' Tonso	Stadium: Toumba Stadium; Attendance: 5,581; Referee: Charalampos Kalogeropoulos

4 December 2016 13	Panathinaikos	1–0	PAOK	Athens
19:30 EET	Coulibaly (yellow card) 32'; Lod 69'; Leto (yellow card) 76'; Moledo (yellow card) 79'	Club report Superleague report UEFA report	(yellow card) 22' Leovac	Stadium: Leoforos Alexandras Stadium; Attendance: 5,221; Referee: Anastasios Papapetrou

11 December 2016 14	PAOK	3–0	Platanias	Thessaloniki
17:15 EET	Matos (yellow card) 25' (goal) 61', 81'; Banana 87' (o.g.)	Club report Superleague report UEFA report	(yellow card) 1' Kargas	Stadium: Toumba Stadium; Attendance: 10,527; Referee: Christos Gkranas

17 December 2016 15	Kerkyra	0–5	PAOK	Kerkyra
19:30 EET	Andreopoulos (yellow card) 36'	Club report Superleague report UEFA report	1' (o.g.) Andreopoulos; 22' Biseswar; (penalty missed) 32', Athanasiadis; 32', 58' Campos; 61' (o.g.) Ioannou; (yellow card) 83' Kitsiou	Stadium: Kerkyra Stadium; Attendance: 1,331; Referee: Dimitrios Karantonis

3 January 2017 1	Levadiakos	0–1	PAOK	Livadeia
19:15 EET	Mangas (yellow card) 72'; Tripotseris (yellow card) 79'	Club report Superleague report UEFA report	(yellow card) 47' Mystakidis; (yellow card) 52' Crespo; (yellow card) 64' Biseswar; 84' Pelkas	Stadium: Levadia Municipal StadiumLivadeia; Attendance: 1,074; Referee: Athanasios Tzilos

8 January 2017 2	PAOK	0–1	PAS Giannina	Thessaloniki
15:00 EET		Club report Superleague report UEFA report	16' Tzimopoulos; (yellow card) 20' Acosta; (yellow card) 90' Paschalakis	Stadium: Toumba Stadium; Attendance: 2,906; Referee: Anastasios Papapetrou

19 January 2017 16	PAOK	3–0	Levadiakos	Thessaloniki
17:30 EET	Matos 20'; Athanasiadis (yellow card) 32'; Cimirot (yellow card) 52'; Pereyra 60'; Pereyra 76'	Club report Superleague report UEFA report	(yellow card) 31' (yellow-red card) 42' Mendy; (yellow card) 35' Milhazes; (yellow card) 37' Moulopoulos; (yellow card) 40' Ouon	Stadium: Toumba Stadium; Attendance: 4,179; Referee: Nikolaos Poulimas

23 January 2017 17	PAS Giannina	0–1	PAOK	Ioannina
19:30 EET	Lila (yellow card) 30'; Conde (yellow card) 79'; Acosta (yellow card) 83'	Club report Superleague report UEFA report	(yellow card) 14' Shakhov; 31' Leovac; (yellow card) 45' Malezas; (yellow card) 68' Mystakidis; (yellow card) 79' Varela; (yellow card) 87' Charisis	Stadium: Zosimades Stadium; Attendance: 3,117; Referee: Christos Gkranas

29 January 2017 18	Panetolikos	0–1	PAOK	Agrinio
17:15 EET	Chantakias (yellow card) 52'; Muñoz (yellow card) 58'; Rocha (yellow card) 80'	Club report Superleague report UEFA report	(red card) 32' Athanasiadis; (yellow card) 48' Shakhov; 62' Mystakidis; (yellow card) 72' Pelkas; (yellow card) 88' Mystakidis; (yellow card) 90+2' Leovac	Stadium: Panetolikos Stadium; Attendance: 2,339; Referee: Xaralampos Kalogeropoulos

1 February 2017 11	AEL	0–2	PAOK	Larissa
19:30 EET	Farkaš (yellow card) 70'	Club report Superleague report UEFA report	7' Mystakidis; (yellow card) 51' Leovac; 61' Matos	Stadium: AEL FC Arena; Attendance: 2,559; Referee: Stavros Mantalos

5 February 2017 19	PAOK	3–2	Asteras Tripolis	Thessaloniki
17:15 EET	Shakhov 28'; Matos (yellow card) 42'; Glykos (yellow card) 49'; Prijović 70'; Henrique 84' (yellow card) 84'	Club report Superleague report UEFA report	(yellow card) 2' Hamdani; (yellow card) 14' Mazza; 18' Manias; (yellow card) 55' Giannoulis; (yellow card) 59' Donnarumma; 79' Manias; (yellow card) 88'Iglesias; (yellow card) 90'Tsilianidis	Stadium: Toumba Stadium; Attendance: 15,209; Referee: Dimitris Thanos

12 February 2017 20	Xanthi	0–0	PAOK	Xanthi
17:15 EET	Deligiannidis (yellow card) 54'; Cimirot (yellow card) 63'; Biseswar (yellow card) 87'	Club report Superleague report UEFA report	(yellow card) 55' Soltani; (yellow card) 59' Baxevanidis; (yellow card) 72' Fliskas; (yellow card) 84' Mejía	Stadium: Xanthi FC Arena; Attendance: 1,959; Referee: Giorgos Kyzas

19 February 2017 21	PAOK	4–0	Veria	Thessaloniki
15:00 EET	Henrique 17'; Prijović 42' (pen.), 50'; Pelkas 72'; Shakhov (yellow card) 82'	Club report Superleague report UEFA report	(yellow card) 32' Tomás; (yellow card) 41' Vasilantonopoulos; (yellow card) 65' Sissoko	Stadium: Toumba Stadium; Attendance: 4,979; Referee: Georgios Blanas

26 February 2017 22	Iraklis	1–1	PAOK	Thessaloniki
17:15 EET	Bastakos 78'; Tzanetopoulos (yellow card) 40'; Donis (yellow card) 90+5'	Club report Superleague report UEFA report	17' Prijović; (yellow card) 48' Pelkas; (yellow card) 75' Cimirot	Stadium: Kaftanzoglio Stadium; Attendance: 3,382; Referee: Christos Granas

5 March 2017 23	PAOK	2–0	Olympiacos	Thessaloniki
19:30 EET	Matos (yellow card) 28'; Varela (yellow card) 41'; Shakhov 53'; Prijović 60'; Campos (yellow card) 66'; Mystakidis (yellow card) 72'; Leovac (yellow card) 77'	Club report Superleague report UEFA report	(yellow card) 20' Figueiras; (yellow card) 36' Elyounoussi	Stadium: Toumba Stadium; Attendance: 26,379; Referee: Georgios Kyzas

12 March 2017 24	AEK Athens	3–0	PAOK	Athens
19:30 EET	Araujo 1', 85' (yellow card) 28'; Simões (yellow card) 74'; Aravidis 90+1'	Club report Superleague report UEFA report	(yellow card) 6' Crespo; (yellow card) 41' (yellow-red card) 52' Malezas	Stadium: Olympic Stadium; Attendance: 11,879; Referee: Anastasios Papapetrou

19 March 2017 25	PAOK	1–0	Panionios	Thessaloniki
15:00 EET	Crespo (yellow card) 28'; Shakhov (yellow card) 44'; Athanasiadis (yellow card) 49'; Pelkas 90+4' (red card) 90+4'	Club report Superleague report UEFA report	(yellow card) 61' (yellow-red card) 77' Oikonomou; (yellow card) 68' Vlachos; (yellow card) 90+3' Mahmutović	Stadium: Toumba Stadium; Attendance: 13,094; Referee: Dimitris Styliaras

2 April 2017 26	PAOK	2–0	AEL	Thessaloniki
17:15 EET	Mystakidis (yellow card) 24'; Cañas 37'; Athanasiadis (yellow card) 51'; Leovac (yellow card) 59'; Kitsiou 87'	Club report Superleague report UEFA report	(yellow card) 28' Avraam	Stadium: Toumba Stadium; Attendance: 12,847; Referee: Evaggelos Kiotzenis

5 April 2017 27	Atromitos	0–2	PAOK	Peristeri, Athens
17:15 EET	Le Tallec (yellow card) 88'	Club report Superleague report UEFA report	2' Biseswar; 38' Koulouris; (yellow card) 68' Kaçe	Stadium: Peristeri Stadium; Attendance: 726; Referee: Georgios Kyzas

9 April 2017 28	PAOK	3–0	Panathinaikos	Thessaloniki
19:00 EET	Shakhov (yellow card) 2' (goal) 30'; Henrique 18' (yellow card) 69'; Leovac 27' (yellow card) 53'; Warda (yellow card) 42'	Club report Superleague report UEFA report	(yellow card) 27' Klonaridis; (yellow card) 35' Molins; (yellow card) 40' Boumal; (yellow card) 70' M'Poku	Stadium: Toumba Stadium; Attendance: 17,209; Referee: Dimitris Styliaras

23 April 2017 29	Platanias	1–3	PAOK	Chania, Crete
19:00 EET	Mendrinos 78'	Club report Superleague report UEFA report	4' Warda; 8' Campos; (yellow card) 36' Kitsiou; 63' (yellow card) 71' Shakhov; (yellow card) 90+1' Varela	Stadium: Perivolia Municipal Stadium; Attendance: 1,989; Referee: Aristidis Vatsios

30 April 2017 30	PAOK	5–1	Kerkyra	Thessaloniki
19:00 EET	Kaçe 30'; Koulouris 32'; Biseswar 45+1' (pen.); Warda 62'; Prijović 84'	Club report Superleague report UEFA report	31' Pamlidis; (yellow card) 90+2' Spinoulas	Stadium: Toumba Stadium; Attendance: 8,206; Referee: Stefanos Koubarakis

Source: paokfc.gr superleaguegreece.net uefa.com

==== League table ====
Pos	Team	Pld	W	D	L	GF	GA	GD	Pts	Qualification
2	AEK Athens	6	4	0	2	5	3	+2	12	Qualification for the Champions League third qualifying round
3	Panathinaikos (Note: Panathinaikos were deducted 3 points due to fan behavior against PAOK.)	6	3	1	2	6	7	−1	8	Qualification for the Europa League third qualifying round (Note: PAOK qualified for the Europa League third qualifying round by winning the Greek Cup.)
4	PAOK (Note: PAOK were deducted 6 points due to fan behavior against AEK Athens in Greek Cup final.)	6	3	0	3	7	5	+2	5	Qualification for the Europa League third qualifying round
5	Panionios	6	1	1	4	3	6	−3	4	Qualification for the Europa League second qualifying round

Source: Super League Greece: Standings, Schedule
Rules for classification: 1) Points; 2) Head-to-head points; 3) Head-to-head goal difference; 4) Goals scored; 5) Goals against; 6) Regular season position.

==== Results by round ====
Round	1	2	3	4	5	6
Ground	H	A	H	A	A	H
Result	L	W	W	W	L	L
Position	4	2	2	2	2	4

Source: League matches
A = Away; H = Home; W = Win; D = Draw; L = Loss

==== Matches ====
Win Draw Loss

14 May 2017 1	PAOK	0–1	AEK Athens	Thessaloniki
20:30 EET	Matos (yellow card) 42'; Campos (yellow card) 52'; Henrique (yellow card) 77'; Pelkas (yellow card) 87'	Report	10' (yellow card) 88' Dídac; (yellow card) 37' Christodoulopoulos; (yellow card) 43' Mantalos; (yellow card) 52' Ajdarević; (yellow card) 75' Simões; (yellow card) 90+1' Bakasetas	Stadium: Toumba Stadium; Attendance: 15,413; Referee: Xaralabos Kalogeropoulos

17 May 2017 2	Panathinaikos	0–3^{*}	PAOK	Athens
20:30 EET		Report		Stadium: Leoforos Alexandras Stadium; Attendance: 4,111; Referee: Giorgos Kominis

21 May 2017 3	PAOK	1–0	Panionios	Thessaloniki
18:15 EET	Pelkas (yellow card) 18'; Prijović 75'	Report	(yellow card) 35' Siopis; (yellow card) 55' Ben; (yellow card) 61' (yellow-red card) 68' Masoud	Stadium: Toumba Stadium; Referee: Aristidis Vatsios

24 May 2017 4	Panionios	0–1	PAOK	Nea Smyrni
18:15 EET	Guihoata (yellow card) 35'; Oikonomou (yellow card) 58'; Tapoko (yellow card) 78'	Report	(yellow card) 8' Poungouras; 14' (o.g.) Risvanis	Stadium: Nea Smyrni Stadium; Referee: Alexandros Aretopoulos

28 May 2017 5	AEK Athens	1–0	PAOK	Athens
20:30 EET	Mantalos (yellow card) 20'; Christodoulopoulos (yellow card) 25'; Bakasetas 42'; Johansson (yellow card) 80'	Report	(yellow card) 20' Campos; (yellow card) 35' Henrique; (yellow card) 45+1' Prijović; (yellow card) 45+1' Charisis; (yellow card) 64' Matos; (yellow card) 90+2' (yellow-red card) 90+6' Malezas; (yellow card) 90+5' Crespo	Stadium: Olympic Stadium; Referee: Dimitris Thanos

31 May 2017 6	PAOK	2–3	Panathinaikos	Thessaloniki
20:30 EET	Biseswar 20'; Kitsiou (yellow card) 59'; Henrique 68' (yellow card) 74'; Shakhov (yellow card) 70'; Cañas (yellow card) 80'	Report	(yellow card) 18' (goal) 90+3' Molins; 28' Klonaridis; (yellow card) 63' Vlachodimos; (yellow card) 67' Villafáñez; (yellow card) 72' Kourbelis; 79' Lod; (yellow card) 82' Marinakis	Stadium: Toumba Stadium; Referee: Charalambos Kalogeropoulos

^{*} Match abandoned in the 54th minute with the score at 1–0. It was later rewarded as a 0–3 win for PAOK.

=== Greek Football Cup ===
==== Group stage ====
Pos	Team	Pld	W	D	L	GF	GA	GD	Pts	Qualification
1	PAOK	3	2	1	0	9	0	+9	7	Round of 16
2	Trikala	3	2	1	0	6	0	+6	7	Round of 16
3	AEL	3	1	0	2	2	4	−2	3	
4	Panelefsiniakos	3	0	0	3	1	14	−13	0	

Source: epo.gr

26 October 2016 1	PAOK	2–0	AEL	Thessaloniki
17:15 EET	Mystakidis 28'; Pereyra 41'	Report	(yellow card) 30' Nico Varela; (yellow card) 36' Anastasopoulos	Stadium: Toumba Stadium; Attendance: TBD; Referee: Ananias Fotiadis

1 December 2016 2	Trikala	0–0	PAOK	Trikala
17:15 EET	Climaco (yellow card) 57'	Report	(yellow card) 84' Crespo	Stadium: Trikala Municipal Stadium; Attendance: TBD; Referee: Alexandros Katsikogiannis

14 December 2016 3	Panelefsiniakos	0–7	PAOK	Elefsina
19:30 EET		Report	48' Athanasiadis; 51' Pereyra; 58' Shakhov; 70' Mystakidis; 75' Koulouris; 77', 90' Pelkas	Stadium: Municipal Stadium of Eleusina; Referee: Andreas Gamaris

==== Round of 16 ====
11 January 2017 1st leg	Panetolikos	0–2	PAOK	Agrinio
17:15 EET		Report	(yellow card) 38' Leovac; (yellow card) 42' Malezas; (yellow card) 63' Glykos; 77' Kitsiou; 84' (pen.) Athanasiadis; (yellow card) 87' Mystakidis	Stadium: Panetolikos Stadium; Attendance: TBD; Referee: Ioannis Neofitiadis

26 January 2017 2nd leg	PAOK	4–1 (6–1 agg.)	Panetolikos	Thessaloniki
19:30 EET	Shakhov (yellow card) 28' (goal) 53'; Deligiannidis 42'; Biseswar 43'; Prijović 78' (pen.)	Report	(yellow card) 37' Tsokanis; 90+3' Paulo	Stadium: Toumba Stadium; Referee: Evangelos Kiotzenis

==== Quarter-finals ====
9 February 2017 1st leg	Xanthi	1–2	PAOK	Xanthi
19:30 EET	Lazić (yellow card) 16' (goal) 52'; Karasalidis (yellow card) 84'	Report	20' Mystakidis; (yellow card) 43' (yellow-red card) 70' Pedro Henrique; (yellow card) 55' Leovac; 64' Prijović	Stadium: Xanthi FC Arena; Referee: Dimitrios Karantonis

2 March 2017 2nd leg	PAOK	0–1 (2–2 agg.)	Xanthi	Thessaloniki
17:15 EET	Varela (yellow card) 42'; Crespo (yellow card) 82'; Biseswar (yellow card) 90+1'	Report	(yellow card) 11' Mejía; (yellow card) 28' (yellow-red card) 90+2' Soltani; 64' Younés; (yellow card) 74' Karasalidis	Stadium: Toumba Stadium; Referee: Georgios Foukakis

PAOK won on away goals.

==== Semi-finals ====
12 April 2017 1st leg	Panathinaikos	2–0	PAOK	Athens
19:00 EET	Moledo 21'; Coulibaly (yellow card) 31'; Leto (yellow card) 80' (goal) 83'	Report	(yellow card) 17' Leovac; (yellow card) 36' Warda; (yellow card) 57' Henrique; (yellow card) 71' Matos	Stadium: Leoforos Alexandras Stadium; Referee: Anastasios Sidiropoulos

27 April 2017 2nd leg	PAOK	4–0 (4–2 agg.)	Panathinaikos	Thessaloniki
19:00 EET	Pelkas 14'; Matos (yellow card) 37' (goal) 48'; Biseswar (yellow card) 51'; Shakhov 73'; Cañas (yellow card) 82'; Prijović 83'	Report	(yellow card) 39' (yellow-red card) 72' Hult; (yellow card) 88' Villafáñez	Stadium: Toumba Stadium; Referee: Georgios kyzas

==== Final ====
6 May 2017 Final	PAOK	2–1	AEK Athens	Volos
20:30 EET	Crespo (yellow card) 14'; Biseswar 24'; Matos (yellow card) 70'; Henrique 81' (yellow card) 88'; Glykos (yellow card) 90+4'	Report	(yellow card) 16' Rodríguez; 27' Christodoulopoulos; (yellow card) 80' Simões	Stadium: Panthessaliko Stadium; Attendance: 19,236; Referee: Giorgos Kominis; Man of the Match: Diego Biseswar

== UEFA Champions League ==
=== Third qualifying round ===
26 July 2016 1st leg	Ajax (Netherlands)	1–1	(Greece) PAOK	Amsterdam, Netherlands
20:45 CET	58' Dolberg	Report	27' Djalma	Stadium: Amsterdam Arena; Attendance: 47,744; Referee: (Spain) Javier Estrada Fernández

3 August 2016 2nd leg	PAOK (Greece)	1–2 (2–3 agg.)	(Netherlands) Ajax	Thessaloniki, Greece
20:30 CET	4' Athanasiadis	Report	45+1' (pen.), 88' Klaassen	Stadium: Toumba Stadium; Attendance: 24,930; Referee: (England) Anthony Taylor

== UEFA Europa League ==
=== Play-off Round ===
All times at CET

18 August 2016 1st leg	Dinamo Tbilisi (Georgia (country))	0–3	(Greece) PAOK	Tbilisi, Georgia
18:00 CET		Report	20' Léo Matos; 71' Crespo; 83' Pereyra	Stadium: Boris Paichadze Dinamo Arena, Attendance: 12,006; Referee: (Israel) Liran Liany

25 August 2016 2nd leg	PAOK (Greece)	2–0 (5–0 agg.)	(Georgia (country)) Dinamo Tbilisi	Thessaloniki, Greece
20:00 CET	5' Rodrigues; 45' Tzavellas	Report		Stadium: Toumba Stadium; Attendance: 14,821; Referee: (Austria) Harald Lechner

=== Group stage ===
Pos	Team	Pld	W	D	L	GF	GA	GD	Pts	Qualification	FIO	PAOK	QRB	LIB
1	(Italy) Fiorentina	6	4	1	1	15	6	+9	13	Advance to knockout phase	—	2–3	5–1	3–0
2	(Greece) PAOK	6	3	1	2	7	6	+1	10	Advance to knockout phase	0–0	—	0–1	2–0
3	(Azerbaijan) Qarabağ	6	2	1	3	7	12	−5	7		1–2	2–0	—	2–2
4	(Czech Republic) Slovan Liberec	6	1	1	4	7	12	−5	4		1–3	1–2	3–0	—

Source: UEFA
Rules for classification: Group stage tiebreakers

15 September 2016 1	PAOK (Greece)	0–0	(Italy) Fiorentina	Thessaloniki, Greece
21:05 CEST (UTC+02:00)		Report		Stadium: Toumba Stadium; Attendance: 20,904; Referee: (Slovenia) Slavko Vinčić

29 September 2016 2	Slovan Liberec (Czech Republic)	1–2	(Greece) PAOK	Liberec, Czech Republic
19:00	Komlichenko 1'	Report	athanasiadis 9', 81'	Stadium: Stadion u Nisy; Attendance: 8,880; Referee: (Hungary) Tamás Bognar

20 October 2016 3	Qarabağ (Azerbaijan)	2–0	(Greece) PAOK	Baku, Azerbaijan
20:00	Quintana 56'; Amirguliev 87'	Report		Stadium: Tofiq Bahramov Republican Stadium; Attendance: 26,784; Referee: (Israel) Alon Yefet

3 November 2016 4	PAOK (Greece)	0–1	(Azerbaijan) Qarabağ	Thessaloniki, Greece
21:05		Report	Míchel 68'	Stadium: Toumba Stadium; Attendance: 11,476; Referee: (Scotland) John Beaton

24 November 2016 5	Fiorentina (Italy)	2–3	(Greece) PAOK	Florence, Italy
19:00 CET (UTC+01:00)	Bernardeschi 33'; Babacar 50'	Report	Shakhov 5'; Campos 27'; Rodrigues 90+3'	Stadium: Stadio Artemio Franchi; Attendance: 12,793; Referee: (Switzerland) Stephan Klossner

8 December 2016 6	PAOK (Greece)	2–0	(Czech Republic) Slovan Liberec	Thessaloniki, Greece
18:00	Rodrigues 29'; Pelkas 67'	Report		Stadium: Toumba Stadium; Attendance: 11,463; Referee: (England) Andre Marriner

=== Knockout round ===
==== Round of 32 ====
16 February 2017 1st leg	PAOK (Greece)	0–3	(Germany) Schalke 04	Thessaloniki, Greece
21:05 CEST (UTC+02:00)		Report	Burgstaller 27'; Meyer 81'; Huntelaar 89'	Stadium: Toumba Stadium; Attendance: 25,593; Referee: (Spain) Javier Estrada Fernández

22 February 2017 2nd leg	Schalke 04 (Germany)	1–1 (4–1 agg.)	(Greece) PAOK	Gelsenkirchen, Germany
19:00 CEST (UTC+02:00)	Schöpf 23'	Report	Nastasić 25' (o.g.)	Stadium: Veltins-Arena; Attendance: 50,619; Referee: (Italy) Luca Banti

== Statistics ==
=== Squad statistics ===
As of 2 June 2017

Appearances denote players in the starting lineup, with the numbers in parentheses denoting appearances as substitute.

No.		Name	Super League		Greek Cup		Europa League		Champions League		UEFA play-offs		Total	
No.		Name	Apps	Goals	Apps	Goals	Apps	Goals	Apps	Goals	Apps	Goals	Apps	Goals
Goalkeepers
23		(Serbia) Željko Brkić	5 (1)	0	3	0	1	0	0	0	2	0	11 (1)	0
71		(Greece) Panagiotis Glykos	26	0	6	0	9	0	2	0	4	0	47	0
99		(Greece) Marios Siampanis	2 (2)	0	0	0	0	0	0	0	0	0	2 (2)	0
Defenders
3		(Brazil) Léo Matos	27 (1)	5	5 (1)	1	9	1	2	0	4	0	47 (2)	7
4		(Croatia) Marin Leovac	25 (4)	2	7 (1)	0	9	0	2	0	6	0	49 (5)	2
5		(Greece) Dimitris Chatziisaias	0	0	0	0	0	0	0	0	0	0	0	0
13		(Greece) Stelios Malezas	22 (6)	0	8 (1)	0	3 (1)	0	0	0	5 (2)	0	38 (10)	0
15		(Spain) José Ángel Crespo	25 (1)	0	7	0	9 (2)	1	2	0	5	0	48 (3)	1
41		(Greece) Panagiotis Deligiannidis	2	0	2	1	0	0	0	0	0	0	4	1
43		(Cape Verde) Fernando Varela	23 (1)	1	7	0	8 (1)	0	0	0	1	0	39 (2)	1
44		(Greece) Achilleas Poungouras	2 (1)	0	1 (1)	0	1	0	0	0	3	0	7 (2)	0
70		(Greece) Stelios Kitsiou	11 (6)	1	9 (3)	1	2 (1)	0	0	0	5 (3)	0	27 (13)	2
Midfielders
7		(Egypt) Amr Warda	8 (1)	2	2	0	2 (1)	0	0	0	2	0	14 (2)	2
8		(Greece) Charis Charisis	9 (5)	0	4 (1)	0	1	0	2	0	2 (1)	0	18 (7)	0
16		(Bosnia and Herzegovina) Gojko Cimirot	25 (1)	0	6 (2)	0	10	0	2	0	6	0	49 (3)	0
21		(Suriname) Diego Biseswar	24 (5)	4	7 (2)	2	6 (4)	0	1 (1)	0	6 (1)	1	44 (13)	7
26		(Albania) Ergys Kaçe	6 (3)	1	2 (2)	0	0	0	0	0	1	0	9 (5)	1
28		(Ukraine) Yevhen Shakhov	21 (4)	4	9	3	10 (3)	1	2	0	2	0	44 (7)	8
77		(Greece) Dimitrios Pelkas	11 (6)	3	7 (3)	3	4 (2)	1	0	0	4 (2)	0	26 (13)	7
87		(Spain) José Cañas	22 (2)	1	7 (2)	0	8 (1)	0	0	0	5 (1)	0	42 (6)	1
Forwards
9		(Serbia) Aleksandar Prijović	9 (5)	6	5 (3)	3	0	0	0	0	6 (1)	1	20 (9)	10
10		(Angola) Djalma Campos	24 (3)	3	4	0	9 (1)	1	2	1	5 (1)	0	44 (5)	5
11		(Brazil) Pedro Henrique	10 (2)	3	4 (2)	1	2 (2)	0	0	0	5 (2)	0	21 (8)	4
20		(Greece) Efthimis Koulouris	16 (5)	5	7 (1)	1	4 (2)	0	2 (2)	0	3 (3)	0	32 (13)	6
27		(Greece) Giannis Mystakidis	17 (10)	3	7	3	5 (2)	0	2 (2)	0	0	0	31 (14)	6
33		(Greece) Stefanos Athanasiadis	21 (6)	0	3 (2)	2	6	2	2	1	1	0	33 (8)	5
Players transferred out during the season
1	GK	(Greece) Markos Vellidis	0	0	1	0	0	0	0	0	0	0	1	0
18	DF	(Greece) Dimitris Giannoulis^{1}	0	0	2	0	0	0	0	0	0	0	2	0
31	DF	(Greece) Georgios Tzavellas	5	0	0	0	5	1	2	0	0	0	12	1
6	MF	(Greece) Alexandros Tziolis	0	0	0	0	0	0	1 (1)	0	0	0	1 (1)	0
34	MF	(Greece) Nikos Korovesis^{1}	0	0	2 (2)	0	0	0	0	0	0	0	2 (2)	0
7	MF	(Senegal) Mame Baba Thiam	1 (1)	0	2 (1)	0	5 (4)	0	0	0	0	0	8 (6)	0
14	MF	(Argentina) Facundo Pereyra^{1}	8 (5)	2	4	2	4 (3)	1	0	0	0	0	16 (8)	5
24	MF	(Cape Verde) Garry Rodrigues	12 (1)	3	0	0	8	3	2	0	0	0	22 (1)	6

^{1} Players out on loan

=== Goalscorers ===
Match played 2 June 2017.

Rank	No.	Pos.	Player	League	Cup	Champ. League	Europa League	UEFA play-offs	Total
1	9	FW	(Serbia) Aleksandar Prijović	6	3	0	0	1	10
2	28	MF	(Ukraine) Yevhen Shakhov	4	3	0	1	0	8
3	3	RB	(Brazil) Léo Matos	5	1	0	1	0	7
4	21	FW	(Suriname) Diego Biseswar	4	2	0	0	1	7
5	77	FW	(Greece) Dimitrios Pelkas	3	3	0	1	0	7
6	20	MF	(Greece) Efthimis Koulouris	5	1	0	0	0	6
7	27	FW	(Greece) Giannis Mystakidis	3	3	0	0	0	6
8		FW	(Cape Verde) Garry Rodrigues^{1}	3	0	0	3	0	6
9	11	FW	(Brazil) Pedro Henrique	3	1	0	0	1	5
10	10	FW	(Angola) Djalma Campos	3	0	1	1	0	5
11		FW	(Argentina) Facundo Pereyra^{1}	2	2	0	1	0	5
12	33	FW	(Greece) S. Athanasiadis	0	2	1	2	0	5
13	7	MF	(Egypt) Amr Warda	2	0	0	0	0	2
14	4	LB	(Croatia) Marin Leovac	2	0	0	0	0	2
15	70	DF	(Greece) Stelios Kitsiou	1	1	0	0	0	2
16	26	MF	(Albania) Ergys Kaçe	1	0	0	0	0	1
17	87	MF	(Spain) José Cañas	1	0	0	0	0	1
18	43	DF	(Cape Verde) Fernando Varela	1	0	0	0	0	1
19	41	DF	(Greece) P. Deligiannidis	0	1	0	0	0	1
20	15	DF	(Spain) José Ángel Crespo	0	0	0	1	0	1
21		DF	(Greece) Georgios Tzavellas^{1}	0	0	0	1	0	1
Own goals				3	0	0	1	1	5
TOTALS				52	23	2	13	7	97

^{1}Players left the club in (Winter) transfer windows.

=== Disciplinary record ===
N	P	Nat.	Name	Super League			Greek Cup			Champions League			Europa League			Total			Notes
N	P	Nat.	Name	Yellow card	Second yellow card	Red card	Yellow card	Second yellow card	Red card	Yellow card	Second yellow card	Red card	Yellow card	Second yellow card	Red card	Yellow card	Second yellow card	Red card	Notes
4	DF	(Croatia)	Marin Leovac	7			3			1			4			15			
15	DF	(Spain)	José Ángel Crespo	5			2			1			2			10			
3	DF	(Brazil)	Léo Matos	5			3						4			12			
28	MF	(Ukraine)	Yevhen Shakhov	7			1						1			9			
43	DF	(Cape Verde)	Fernando Varela (footballer)	4			1						3			8			
33	FW	(Greece)	Stefanos Athanasiadis	4		1				1			2			7		1	
27	MF	(Greece)	Giannis Mystakidis	6			1									7			
77	FW	(Greece)	Dimitrios Pelkas	2		1							2			4		1	
13	DF	(Greece)	Stelios Malezas	3	1		1									4	1		
	FW	(Cape Verde)	Garry Rodrigues	2									2			4			Out in Winter TW
10	FW	(Angola)	Djalma Campos	4												4			
16	MF	(Bosnia and Herzegovina)	Gojko Cimirot	4												4			
87	MF	(Spain)	José Cañas	2		1	1						1			4		1	
	DF	(Greece)	Georgios Tzavellas	2									1			3			Out in Winter TW
71	GK	(Greece)	Panagiotis Glykos	1			2			1						4			
21	FW	(Suriname)	Diego Biseswar	2			2									4			
11	FW	(Brazil)	Pedro Henrique Konzen	2			1	1					1			4	1		
8	MF	(Greece)	Charis Charisis	1												1			
70	DF	(Greece)	Stelios Kitsiou	2												2			
	FW	(Argentina)	Facundo Pereyra										1			1			Out in Winter TW
41	DF	(Greece)	Panagiotis Deligiannidis	1												1			
26	MF	(Albania)	Ergys Kaçe	1												1			
7	MF	(Egypt)	Amr Warda	1			1									2			

Last updated: 15 May 2017
Source: superleaguegreece.net, uefa.com, paokfc.gr
Ordered by (red card) , (second yellow card) and (yellow card)
(yellow card) = Number of bookings; (second yellow card) = Number of sending offs after a second yellow card; (red card) = Number of sending offs by a direct red card.
