= 2017–18 PAOK FC season =

PAOK
2017–18 season
- President: Ivan Savvidis
- Manager: Aleksandar Stanojević (until 11 August); Răzvan Lucescu (from 11 August)
- Stadium: Toumba Stadium
- Super League: 2nd
- Greek Cup: Winners
- UEFA Europa League: Play-off round
- Top goalscorer: League: Aleksandar Prijović (19); All: Aleksandar Prijović (27)
| Home colours | Away colours | Third colours |

The 2017–18 season was PAOK Football Club's 92nd in existence and the club's 59th consecutive season in the top flight of Greek football. The season was marked by two derby matches (vs Olympiacos on 25 February and vs AEK Athens on 11 March) that were awarded against PAOK by court decision. The team defended their Greek Cup title won in 2017 and also competed in UEFA Europa League.

== Coaching staff ==
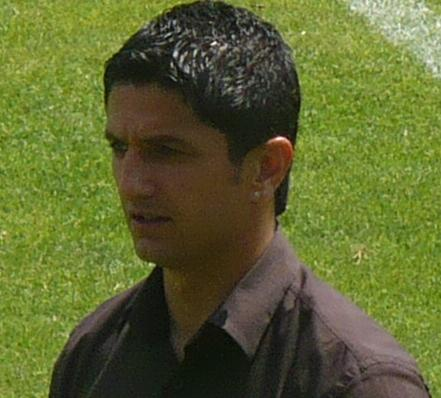
This is Răzvan Lucescu's first season with PAOK.

| Position | Staff |
|---|---|
| Head coach | (Romania) Răzvan Lucescu |
| Assistant manager | (Italy) Diego Longo |
| Assistant manager | (Italy) Cristiano Bacci |
| Team Manager | (Greece) Pantelis Konstantinidis |
| Goalkeeping coach | (Greece) Giorgos Skiatitis |
| Head Gymnast Rehabilitation | (Greece) Georgios Tsonakas |
| Gymnast Rehabilitation | (Greece) Vasilios Kanaras |
| Fitness Coach | (Italy) Matteo Spatafora |
| Data Analyst (Vis-Track) | (Greece) Kyriakos Tsitsiridis |
| Opponent Analysis | (Greece) Ioannis Thomaidis |
| Head of Medical Services | (Greece) Emmanouil Papakostas |
| Club's Doctor | (Greece) Kostas Tziantzis |
| Exercise Physiology | (Greece) Giorgos Ziogas |
| Nutritionist | (Greece) Ioanna Paspala |
| Physiotherapist | (Greece) Petros Nikolakoudis |
| Physiotherapist | (Greece) Nikolaos Tsirelas |
| Physiotherapist | (Greece) Athanasios Kapoulas |
| Physiotherapist | (Greece) Nikolaos Gagalis |
| Physiotherapist | (Greece) Nikolaos Mouratidis |
| Academy's Technical Director | (Spain) Daniel Bigas Alsina |

Last updated: 18 August 2017
Source: PAOK F.C.

=== Other information ===
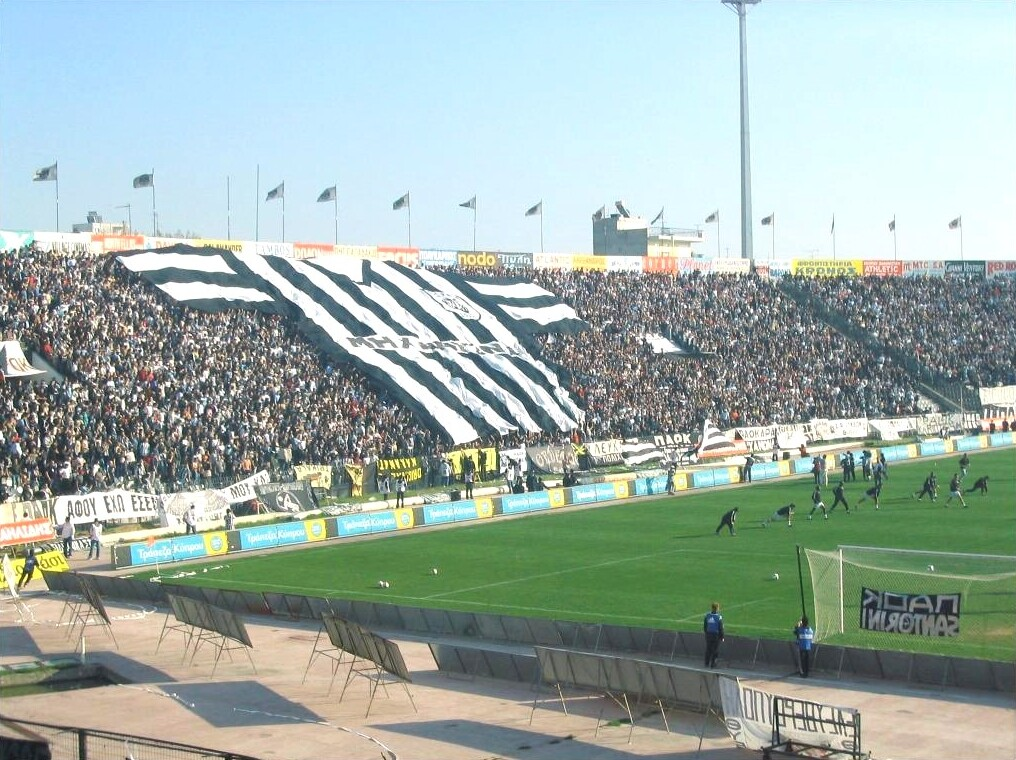
Toumba Stadium

| Owner | Dimera Group Limited |
| Chairman | (Russia) (Greece) Ivan Savvidis |
| Vice President & CEO | (Greece) Chrisostomos Gagatsis |
| Technical Director | (Slovakia) Ľuboš Micheľ |
| Members | (Russia) (Greece) Giorgos Savvidis (Russia) Maria Goncharova (Russia) Artur Davidyan (Greece) Dimokratis Papadopoulos (Greece) Ilias Gerontidis |
| Consultant of Football | (Greece) Giorgos Koudas |
| Ground (capacity and dimensions) | Toumba Stadium (28,701 / 106×71 metres) |
| Training Ground | PAOK Sport Center |

Source: PAOK F.C.

== Players ==
=== Squad information ===
| N | Pos. | Nat. | Name | Age | EU | Since | App | Goals | Ends | Transfer fee | Notes |
|---|---|---|---|---|---|---|---|---|---|---|---|
| 1 | GK | (Argentina) | Rodrigo Rey | 35 | EU | 2017 | 18 | 0 | 2021 | €1.5M | Second nationality: Italy |
| 3 | RWB | (Brazil) | Léo Matos (Vice-captain) | 40 | Non-EU | 2016 | 85 | 14 | 2021 | | |
| 5 | CB | (Cape Verde) | Fernando Varela | 38 | EU | 2016 | 74 | 3 | 2019 | €1.4M | Second nationality: Portugal |
| 6 | DF | (France) | Dorian Lévêque | 36 | EU | 2017 | 1 | 0 | 2020 | | |
| 7 | AM | (Morocco) | Omar El Kaddouri | 36 | EU | 2017 | 21 | 2 | 2021 | €1.3M | Second nationality: Belgium |
| 8 | MF | (Brazil) | Maurício | 38 | Non-EU | 2017 | 27 | 4 | 2020 | | |
| 9 | CF | (Serbia) | Aleksandar Prijović (Vice-captain) | 36 | EU | 2017 | 59 | 37 | 2022 | €1.9M | |
| 10 | FW | (Angola) | Djalma Campos | 39 | EU | 2016 | 76 | 12 | 2019 | | Second nationality: Portugal |
| 13 | CB | (Greece) | Stelios Malezas (captain) | 41 | EU | 2005/2015 | 236 | 5 | 2018 | €0.10M | |
| 15 | CB | (Spain) | José Ángel Crespo (Vice-captain) | 39 | EU | 2016 | 80 | 3 | 2019 | | |
| 16 | DF | (Bosnia and Herzegovina) | Marko Mihojević | 30 | EU | 2018 | 1 | 0 | 2020 | | |
| 18 | LW | (Greece) | Dimitrios Limnios | 28 | EU | 2017 | 31 | 1 | 2021 | €0.80M | |
| 20 | CF | (Greece) | Efthimis Koulouris | 30 | EU | 2009 | 83 | 14 | 2021 | PAOK U20 | |
| 21 | FW | (Suriname) | Diego Biseswar | 38 | EU | 2016 | 76 | 10 | 2019 | | |
| 28 | CM | (Ukraine) | Yevhen Shakhov | 35 | Non-EU | 2016 | 77 | 16 | 2019 | | |
| 29 | MF | (Slovakia) | Róbert Mak | 35 | EU | 2014/2017 | 116 | 33 | 2018 | | |
| 30 | DF | (Brazil) | Márcio Azevedo | 40 | Non-EU | 2018 | 7 | 0 | 2018 | | |
| 31 | GK | (Greece) | Alexandros Paschalakis | 37 | EU | 2017 | 24 | 0 | 2020 | | |
| 41 | FB | (Greece) | Panagiotis Deligiannidis | 30 | EU | 2012 | 12 | 1 | 2020 | PAOK U20 | |
| 44 | CB | (Greece) | Achilleas Poungouras | 30 | EU | 2012 | 12 | 0 | 2019 | PAOK U20 | |
| 71 | GK | (Greece) | Panagiotis Glykos (Vice-captain) | 40 | EU | 2007 | 165 | 0 | 2019 | | |
| 75 | MF | (France) | Thibault Moulin | 36 | EU | 2018 | 3 | 0 | 2021 | €1.3M | |
| 77 | FW | (Greece) | Dimitrios Pelkas (Vice-captain) | 33 | EU | 2007 | 126 | 29 | 2021 | PAOK U20 | |
| 87 | DM | (Spain) | José Cañas | 39 | EU | 2016 | 64 | 2 | 2019 | | |
| 88 | DF | (Portugal) | Vieirinha (Vice-captain) | 40 | EU | 2008/2017 | 155 | 30 | 2020 | €1M | |
| 99 | GK | (Greece) | Marios Siampanis | 27 | EU | 2015 | 3 | 0 | 2019 | PAOK U20 | |

- Last updated: 12 May 2018
- Source: paokfc.gr, 2017/18 numbers, Players in / out, Wikipedia players' articles, and paokfc.gr (for appearances and goals)

=== Players in ===
| No. | Pos. | Nat. | Name | Age | EU | Moving from | Type | Transfer window | Ends | Transfer fee | Source |
|---|---|---|---|---|---|---|---|---|---|---|---|
| 18 | LW | (Greece) | Dimitrios Limnios | 28 | EU | (Greece) Atromitos | Transfer | Summer | 2021 | €0.80M | |
| 6 | DF | (France) | Dorian Lévêque | 36 | EU | (France) Guingamp | Free transfer | Summer | 2020 | Free | |
| 22 | DF | (Greece) | Dimitris Konstantinidis | 32 | EU | (Cyprus) Omonia | Loan return | Summer | 2019 | Free | |
| 30 | GK | (Greece) | Nikos Melissas | 33 | EU | (Greece) Sparta | Loan return | Summer | 2020 | Free | |
| 34 | MF | (Greece) | Nikos Korovesis | 35 | EU | (Greece) PAS Giannina | Loan return | Summer | 2018 | Free | |
| 19 | FW | (Brazil) | Jairo | 34 | Non-EU | (Greece) PAS Giannina | Loan return | Summer | 2019 | Free | |
| 93 | MF | (Australia) | Terry Antonis | 32 | EU | (Australia) Western Sydney Wanderers | Loan return | Summer | 2018 | Free | |
| 90 | DF | (Greece) | Dimitris Giannoulis | 31 | EU | (Cyprus) Anorthosis | Loan return | Summer | 2020 | Free | |
| 29 | MF | (Slovakia) | Róbert Mak | 35 | EU | (Russia) Zenit Saint Petersburg | Loan | Summer | 2018 | Free | |
| 1 | GK | (Argentina) | Rodrigo Rey | 35 | EU | (Argentina) Godoy Cruz | Transfer | Summer | 2021 | €1.5M | |
| 31 | GK | (Greece) | Alexandros Paschalakis | 37 | EU | (Greece) PAS Giannina | Free transfer | Summer | 2018 | Free | |
| 7 | AM | (Morocco) | Omar El Kaddouri | 36 | EU | (Italy) Empoli | Transfer | Summer | 2021 | €1.3M | |
| 8 | MF | (Brazil) | Maurício | 38 | Non-EU | (Russia) Zenit Saint Petersburg | Free transfer | Summer | 2020 | Free | |
| 88 | MF | (Portugal) | Vieirinha | 40 | EU | (Germany) VfL Wolfsburg | Transfer | Summer | 2020 | €1M | |
| 2 | DF | (Peru) | Carlos Zambrano | 37 | EU | (Russia) Rubin Kazan | Loan | Summer | 2018 | ? | |
| 30 | DF | (Brazil) | Márcio Azevedo | 40 | Non-EU | (Ukraine) Shakhtar Donetsk | Loan | Winter | 2018 | | |
| — | MF | (France) | Thibault Moulin | 36 | EU | (Poland) Legia Warsaw | Transfer | Winter | 2021 | €1.3M | |
| — | DF | (Bosnia and Herzegovina) | Marko Mihojević | 30 | EU | (Bosnia and Herzegovina) FK Sarajevo | Transfer | Winter | 2021 | €500k | |

Total spending: ▼€6.40M

=== Players out ===
| No. | Pos. | Nat. | Name | Age | EU | Moving to | Type | Transfer window | Transfer fee | Source |
|---|---|---|---|---|---|---|---|---|---|---|
| 70 | RB | (Greece) | Stelios Kitsiou | 33 | EU | (Belgium) Sint-Truidense | Loan | Summer | Free | |
| 8 | MF | (Greece) | Charis Charisis | 31 | EU | (Belgium) Sint-Truidense | Loan | Summer | Free | |
| 90 | DF | (Greece) | Dimitris Giannoulis | 31 | EU | (Greece) Atromitos | Loan | Summer | Free | |
| 5 | DF | (Greece) | Dimitris Chatziisaias | 34 | EU | (Greece) Atromitos | Loan | Summer | Free | |
| 14 | FW | (Argentina) | Facundo Pereyra | 39 | Non-EU | | Released | Summer | Free | |
| 93 | MF | (Australia) | Terry Antonis | 32 | EU | (Netherlands) Venlo | Free transfer | Summer | Free | |
| 34 | MF | (Greece) | Nikos Korovesis | 35 | EU | (Greece) Platanias | Free transfer | Summer | Free | |
| 19 | FW | (Brazil) | Jairo | 34 | Non-EU | (Moldova) Sheriff Tiraspol | Loan | Summer | Free | |
| 30 | GK | (Greece) | Nikos Melissas | 33 | EU | (Greece) PAS Lamia | Loan | Summer | Free | |
| 33 | CF | (Greece) | Stefanos Athanasiadis | 37 | EU | (Israel) Maccabi Haifa | Free transfer | Summer | Free | |
| 7 | FW | (Egypt) | Amr Warda | 33 | Non-EU | (Greece) Atromitos | Loan | Summer | Free | |
| 11 | FW | (Brazil) | Pedro Henrique Konzen | 36 | Non-EU | (Azerbaijan) Qarabağ | Loan with option to buy (€5m) | Summer | €500k | |
| 16 | MF | (Bosnia and Herzegovina) | Gojko Cimirot | 33 | EU | (Belgium) Standard Liège | Transfer | Winter | €2.5M | |
| 2 | DF | (Peru) | Carlos Zambrano | 37 | EU | (Russia) Rubin Kazan | End of Loan | Winter | | |
| 22 | RB | (Greece) | Dimitris Konstantinidis | 32 | EU | (Italy) Brescia | Free transfer | Winter | Free | |
| 26 | DM | (Albania) | Ergys Kaçe | 33 | EU | (Greece) Panathinaikos | Loan with option to buy | Winter | Free | |
| 27 | FW | (Greece) | Giannis Mystakidis | 31 | EU | (Greece) Panathinaikos | Loan | Winter | Free | |
| 4 | LB | (Croatia) | Marin Leovac | 38 | EU | (Croatia) Rijeka | Loan with option to buy | Winter | Free | |
| 23 | GK | (Serbia) | Željko Brkić | 40 | EU | | Contract termination | Winter | Free | |

▲ Total Income: €3M
Net income: ▼€3.4M

== Pre-season ==
Win Draw Loss

| 4 July 2017 Friendly | Tubize | 0–4 | PAOK | Horst, Netherlands |
| 19:00 EET UTC+03:00 | | Club report | 12' Prijović; 35' Henrique; 66' Biseswar; 79' (pen.) Koulouris; (yellow card) 82' Kaçe | Stadium: Molenstraat, Swolgen |

| 7 July 2017 Friendly | Gent | 2–0 | PAOK | Horst, Netherlands |
| 17:00 EET UTC+03:00 | Matton 31'; Mamadou Sylla 86' | Club report | | Stadium: Molenstraat, Swolgen |

| 12 July 2017 Friendly | VVV-Venlo | 0–1 | PAOK | Arnhem, Netherlands |
| 18:00 EET UTC+03:00 | | Club report | (yellow card) 25' Malezas; 70' Prijović; (yellow card) 86' Crespo | Stadium: Marasingel, Arnhem |

| 15 July 2017 Friendly | Ajax | 4–2 | PAOK | Amsterdam, Netherlands |
| 20:00 EET UTC+03:00 | Mazraoui 5'; Huntelaar 26'; Cassierra 66'; Flemming 89' | Club report | 38' Varela; 51' Prijović | Stadium: Sportpark De Toekomst |

| 21 July 2017 Friendly | PAOK | 2–0 | Anorthosis | Thessaloniki, Greece |
| 20:30 EET UTC+03:00 | Djalma 10'; Prijović 16'; Matos (yellow card) 70' | Club report | (yellow card) 29' Carlitos; (yellow card) 78' Schildenfeld; (yellow card) 90' João Victor | Stadium: Toumba; Referee: Athanasios Tzilos |

| 8 August 2017 Friendly | PAOK | 1–1 | PAS Giannina | Thessaloniki, Greece |
| 19:00 EET UTC+03:00 | Prijović 1' | Club report | 19' Nikolias | Stadium: Toumba; Referee: Koula Hasan |

| 9 August 2017 Friendly | PAOK | 0–1 | Lamia | Thessaloniki, Greece |
| 20:00 EET UTC+03:00 | | Club report | 89' Tsoukalos | Stadium: Toumba; Referee: Athanasios Sezos |

| 2 September 2017 Friendly | Volos | 4–2 | PAOK | Volos, Greece |
| 19:00 EET UTC+03:00 | Iliopoulos 11'; Pitu Garcia 17'; Matzis 38'; Demirtzoglou 90' | Club report | 20' El Kaddouri; 77' Gargalatzidis | Stadium: Volos Municipal Stadium |

== Competitions ==
=== Overview ===
| Competition | First match | Last match | Starting round | Final position | Record | | | | | | | |
| Competition | First match | Last match | Starting round | Final position | Pld | W | D | L | GF | GA | GD | Win % |
|---|---|---|---|---|---|---|---|---|---|---|---|---|
| Super League | 20 August 2017 | 6 May 2018 | Matchday 1 | Runner up | 30 | 21 | 4 | 5 | 59 | 19 | +40 | 70.00 |
| Greek Cup | 20 September 2017 | 12 May 2018 | Group stage | Winners | 10 | 10 | 0 | 0 | 28 | 6 | +22 | 100.00 |
| UEFA Europa League | 27 July 2017 | 24 August 2017 | Third qualifying round | Play-off round | 4 | 2 | 1 | 1 | 6 | 4 | +2 | 50.00 |
| Total | | | | | 44 | 33 | 5 | 6 | 93 | 29 | +64 | 75.00 |

Last updated: 12 May 2018.
Source: Competitions

=== Managerial statistics ===
| Head coach | From | To | Record | | | | | | | |
| Head coach | From | To | G | W | D | L | GF | GA | GD | Win % |
|---|---|---|---|---|---|---|---|---|---|---|
| (Serbia) Aleksandar Stanojević | Start Season (16.06.2017) | 11.08.2017 | 2 | 1 | 1 | 0 | 3 | 1 | +2 | 50.00 |
| (Romania) Răzvan Lucescu | 11.08.2017 | Present | 41 | 33 | 4 | 4 | 91 | 22 | +69 | 80.49 |

=== Super League ===
==== League table ====
| Pos | Team | Pld | W | D | L | GF | GA | GD | Pts | Qualification or relegation |
|---|---|---|---|---|---|---|---|---|---|---|
| 1 | AEK Athens (C) | 30 | 21 | 7 | 2 | 50 | 12 | +38 | 70 | Qualification for the Champions League third qualifying round |
| 2 | PAOK | 30 | 21 | 4 | 5 | 59 | 19 | +40 | 64 (Note: PAOK were deducted 3 points by court decision.) | Qualification for the Champions League second qualifying round |
| 3 | Olympiacos | 30 | 18 | 6 | 6 | 63 | 28 | +35 | 57 (Note: Olympiacos were deducted 3 points due to crowd behavior against AEK on 4 February 2018.) | Qualification for the Europa League third qualifying round |
| 4 | Atromitos | 30 | 15 | 11 | 4 | 43 | 21 | +22 | 56 | Qualification for the Europa League second qualifying round |
| 5 | Asteras Tripolis | 30 | 12 | 9 | 9 | 39 | 24 | +15 | 45 (Note: Head-to-head points: Asteras Tripolis 2, Xanthi 2.) | Qualification for the Europa League second qualifying round |

Source: Super League Greece
Rules for classification: 1) Points; 2) Head-to-head points; 3) Head-to-head goal difference; 4) Goals scored; 5) Goals against; 6) Play-offs (neutral ground); 7) Draw.
(Note: Criteria 6 is only used if needed to decide champion, teams for relegation or teams for UEFA competitions).
(C) Champions

==== Results summary ====
| Overall | | | | | | | | Home | | | | | | Away | | | | | |
| Pld | W | D | L | GF | GA | GD | Pts | W | D | L | GF | GA | GD | W | D | L | GF | GA | GD |
|---|---|---|---|---|---|---|---|---|---|---|---|---|---|---|---|---|---|---|---|
| 30 | 21 | 4 | 5 | 59 | 19 | +40 | 67 | 13 | 0 | 2 | 36 | 10 | +26 | 8 | 4 | 3 | 23 | 9 | +14 |

Source: Competitive matches

Note: PAOK were deducted 3 points by court decision.

==== Results by round ====
| Round | 1 | 2 | 3 | 4 | 5 | 6 | 7 | 8 | 9 | 10 | 11 | 12 | 13 | 14 | 15 | 16 | 17 | 18 | 19 | 20 | 21 | 22 | 23 | 24 | 25 | 26 | 27 | 28 | 29 | 30 |
|---|---|---|---|---|---|---|---|---|---|---|---|---|---|---|---|---|---|---|---|---|---|---|---|---|---|---|---|---|---|---|
| Ground | A | H | A | H | H | A | H | A | H | A | H | A | A | H | A | H | A | H | A | A | H | A | H | A | H | A | H | H | A | H |
| Result | D | W | D | W | W | D | W | L | W | L | W | D | W | W | W | W | W | W | W | W | W | W | L | L | L | W | W | W | W | W |
| Position | 10 | 5 | 5 | 4 | 3 | 2 | 1 | 2 | 2 | 3 | 2 | 3 | 3 | 3 | 3 | 3 | 3 | 2 | 1 | 1 | 1 | 1 | 1 | 2 | 2 | 2 | 2 | 2 | 2 | 2 |

Source: League matches
A = Away; H = Home; W = Win; D = Draw; L = Loss; P = Postponed

==== Matches ====
| 20 August 2017 1 | Levadiakos | 0–0 | PAOK | Livadeia |
| 19:15 EET, UTC+03:00 | Niasse (yellow card) 26'; Tripotseris (yellow card) 32'; Adilehou (yellow card) 45'; Brandão (yellow card) 65' | Report | (yellow card) 2' Malezas; (yellow card) 52' Mak | Stadium: Levadia Municipal Stadium; Attendance: 1.161; Referee: Stavros Mantalos |

| 27 August 2017 2 | PAOK | 3–1 | Kerkyra | Thessaloniki |
| 19:15 EET, UTC+03:00 | Prijović 41'; Shakhov (yellow card) 45+1'; Pelkas 54'; Mak 59'; Kaçe (yellow card) 90+3' | Report | 45+2' (pen.) Nunes; (yellow card) 90+3' Bauman | Stadium: Toumba Stadium; Attendance: C. doors Referee: Georgios Tzovaras |

| 11 September 2017 3 | Apollon Smyrnis | 0–0 | PAOK | Athens |
| 19:30 EET, UTC+03:00 | Juárez (yellow card) 30' (yellow-red card) 32'; Kontoes (yellow card) 41'; Čović (yellow card) 83' | Report | (yellow card) 25' Pelkas; (yellow card) 50' El Kaddouri; (yellow card) 75' Crespo; (yellow card) 84' Kaçe; (yellow card) 87' Maurício | Stadium: Georgios Kamaras Stadium; Attendance: 1.913; Referee: Dimitrios Styliaras |

| 16 September 2017 4 | PAOK | 1–0 | Panetolikos | Thessaloniki |
| 18:15 EET, UTC+03:00 | Pelkas (yellow card) 71'; Prijović 75' | Report | (yellow card) 36' Bejarano; (yellow card) 44' Mihaj | Stadium: Toumba Stadium; Attendance: C. doors Referee: Aristotelis Diamantopoulos |

| 24 September 2017 5 | PAOK | 1–0 | PAS Giannina | Thessaloniki |
| 16:00 EET, UTC+03:00 | Prijović 55' | Report | (yellow card) 24' Mavropanos; (yellow card) 50' Karanikas; (yellow card) 71' Soltani; (yellow card) 84' Chalkiadakis | Stadium: Toumba Stadium; Attendance: C. doors Referee: Angelos Evangelou |

| 30 September 2017 6 | AEL | 1–1 | PAOK | Larissa |
| 20:30 EET, UTC+03:00 | Farkaš (yellow card) 50'; Aganović (yellow card) 66'; Perrone (yellow card) 78'; Andoni (yellow card) 82'; Križman 89' | Report | (yellow card) 18' Maurício; (yellow card) 37' Zambrano; 44' (yellow card) 55' Matos; (yellow card) 52' Pelkas; (yellow card) 70' Prijović; (red card) 87' Koulouris | Stadium: AEL FC Arena; Attendance: 4.813; Referee: Alexandros Katsikogiannis |

| 15 October 2017 7 | PAOK | 4–0 | Lamia | Thessaloniki |
| 16:00 EET, UTC+03:00 | Leovac 10'; Prijović 24', 88'; Pelkas (yellow card) 38' (goal) 50'; Shakhov (yellow card) 52'; Maurício (yellow card) 89' | Report | Anastasopoulos (yellow card) 58' (yellow-red card) 71' | Stadium: Toumba Stadium; Attendance: C. doors Referee: Athanasios Tzilos |

| 22 October 2017 8 | Olympiacos | 1–0 | PAOK | Piraeus |
| 20:30 EET, UTC+03:00 | Cissé (yellow card) 22'; Androutsos (yellow card) 24'; Engels 51'; Ofoe (yellow card) 90+1'; Pardo (yellow card) 90+1' | Report | (yellow card) 22' Prijović; (yellow card) 31' Matos; (yellow card) 77' Cimirot; (yellow card) 89' El Kaddouri | Stadium: Karaiskakis Stadium; Attendance: 30.250; Referee: Georgios Kominis |

| 30 October 2017 9 | PAOK | 2–0 | Asteras Tripolis | Thessaloniki |
| 19:30 EET, UTC+03:00 | Maurício 34', 38' | Report | (yellow card) 29' Tsoukalas; (yellow card) 72' Giannoulis | Stadium: Toumba Stadium; Attendance: C. doors Referee: Dimitrios Karantonis |

| 5 November 2017 10 | AEK Athens | 1–0 | PAOK | Athens |
| 19:30 EET, UTC+03:00 | Araujo (red card) 8'; Livaja 10'; Christodoulopoulos (yellow card) 23'; Lopes (yellow card) 67'; Galanopoulos (yellow card) 80'; Anestis (yellow card) 89' | Report | (yellow card) 8' (yellow-red card) 35' Zambrano; (yellow card) 28' Prijović; (yellow card) 45+3' Shakhov; (yellow card) 50' El Kaddouri; (yellow card) 63' Vieirinha; (yellow card) 90+1' (yellow-red card) 90+1' Biseswar | Stadium: Olympic Stadium; Attendance: 14,056 |

| 20 November 2017 11 | PAOK | 2–1 | Atromitos | Thessaloniki |
| 19:30 EET, UTC+03:00 | Vieirinha 45' (pen.); Fernando Varela (yellow card) 65'; Djalma Campos 71'; Prijović (yellow card) 89'; Rey (yellow card) 90+3' | Report | 22' Stefanos Strouggis; (yellow card) 25' Vasilakakis; (yellow card) 30' Diguiny | Stadium: Toumba Stadium; Attendance: C. doors Referee: (Greece) Anastasios Papapetrou |

| 26 November 2017 12 | Panionios | 2–2 | PAOK | Nea Smyrni, Athens |
| 15:00 EET, UTC+03:00 | Kotnik (yellow card) 40'; Spiridonović 48'; Yeşil 86' (yellow card) 87' | Report | 41' (pen.) Koulouris; 90+3' Léo Matos | Stadium: Nea Smyrni Stadium; Attendance: 2,974; Referee: (Greece) Anastasios Sidiropoulos |

| 2 December 2017 13 | Xanthi | 0–3 | PAOK | Xanthi |
| 17:15 EET, UTC+03:00 | Jorge Casado (yellow card) 24'; Baxevanidis (yellow card) 67'; Svarnas (yellow card) 87' | Report | 25' (o.g.) Pablo; (yellow card) 27' José Cañas; 33' Mak; (yellow card) 57' Limnios; 62' José Ángel Crespo | Stadium: Xanthi FC Arena; Attendance: 2,876; Referee: (Greece) Manolis Skoulas |

| 10 December 2017 14 | PAOK | 4–0 | Panathinaikos | Thessaloniki |
| 19:30 EET, UTC+03:00 | Pelkas 8', 51' (yellow card) 9'; Léo Matos (yellow card) 39'; Koulouris 67' (pen.); Prijović 77'; Mak (red card) 79' | Report | (yellow card) 23' (yellow-red card) 66' Insúa; (yellow card) 80' Dioudis; (yellow card) 80' Villafáñez; (yellow card) 81' Kourbelis | Stadium: Toumba Stadium; Attendance: 26,140; Referee: (Greece) Dimitrios Styliaras |

| 16 December 2017 15 | Platanias | 0–1 | PAOK | Chania, Crete |
| 19:30 EET, UTC+03:00 | Vanderson (yellow card) 61'; Stamou (yellow card) 80' | Report | 56' Malezas; (yellow card) 84' José Cañas | Stadium: Perivolia Municipal Stadium; Attendance: 1,672; Referee: (Greece) Aristotelis Diamantopoulos |

| 6 January 2018 16 | PAOK | 5–0 | Levadiakos | Thessaloniki |
| 17:15 EET, UTC+03:00 | Matos 18'; Campos 48', 59'; Prijović 57', 59' (pen.) | Report | (yellow card) 26' Niasse; (yellow card) 26' Belghazouani; (yellow card) 37' (yellow-red card) 90+4'Tsabouris | Stadium: Toumba Stadium; Attendance: 12.012; Referee: (Greece) Aristidis Vatsios |

| 14 January 2018 17 | Kerkyra | 0–3 | PAOK | Corfu |
| 15:00 EET, UTC+03:00 | | Report | 23' Matos; 57' Campos; 78' Pelkas | Stadium: Kerkyra Stadium; Referee: Athanasios Tzilos |

| 21 January 2018 18 | PAOK | 3–0 | Apollon Smyrnis | Thessaloniki |
| 15:00 EET, UTC+03:00 | Mak 26'; Koné 45+1' (o.g.); Limnios (yellow card) 83'; Prijović 90+1' | Report | (yellow card) 24' Kontoes; (yellow card) 29' (yellow-red card) 84' Nadales | Stadium: Toumba Stadium; Referee: Ioannis Neofutiadis |

| 28 January 2018 19 | Panetolikos | 0–1 | PAOK | Agrinio |
| 15:00 EET, UTC+03:00 | Clésio (yellow card) 61'; Marinakis (yellow card) 73'; Vasiloudis (yellow card) 78'; Chantakias (yellow card) 80'; Mihaj (yellow card) 87' | Report | (yellow card) 57' Biseswar; 87' (pen.) Prijović; (yellow card) 90' Maurício; (yellow card) 90+3' Shakhov | Stadium: Panetolikos Stadium; Referee: Dimitrios Thanos |

| 4 February 2018 20 | PAS Giannina | 1–3 | PAOK | Ioannina |
| 15:00 EET, UTC+03:00 | Garoufalias (yellow card) 37'; Conde 71'; Cikarski (yellow card) 78'; Boukouvalas (yellow card) 81' | Report | 10' Pelkas; (yellow card) 37' Crespo; 40', 45' Prijović; (yellow card) 90' Shakhov; (yellow card) 90+1' Vieirinha | Stadium: Zosimades Stadium; Referee: Aristomenis Koutsiautis |

| 12 February 2018 21 | PAOK | 3–0 | AEL | Thessaloniki |
| 19:30 EET, UTC+03:00 | Shakhov 12'; Varela 40'; Prijović 49' | Report | (yellow card) 45' Fatjon; (yellow card) 69' Deletić; (yellow card) 81' Gojković | Stadium: Toumba Stadium; Referee: Aristotelis Diamantopoulos |

| 17 February 2018 22 | Lamia | 0–2 | PAOK | Lamia |
| 19:30 EET, UTC+03:00 | Omo (yellow card) 66'; Papadopoulos (yellow card) 87'; Acosta (yellow card) 90+1' | Report | 57' Pelkas; 61' Maurício; (yellow card) 88' Limnios | Stadium: Lamia Municipal Stadium; Referee: Angelos Evangelou |

| 25 February 2018 23 | PAOK | 0–3 | Olympiacos | Thessaloniki |
| 19:30 EET, UTC+03:00 | | | | Stadium: Toumba Stadium; Referee: Alexandros Aretopoulos |
Note: Match was suspended before kick-off due to crowd trouble. Olympiacos were awarded a 3–0 win.

| 4 March 2018 24 | Asteras Tripolis | 3–2 | PAOK | Tripoli |
| 15:00 EET, UTC+03:00 | Kyriakopoulos 18'; Triantafyllopoulos (yellow card) 51'; Tonso 53'; Iglesias (yellow card) 62' (goal) 90+8'; Dudú (yellow card) 69'; Kaltsas (yellow card) 90+6' | Report | 37' Campos; (yellow card) 72' Azevedo; (yellow card) 80' Malezas; (yellow card) 82' (goal) 90+7' Prijović; (yellow card) 90+1' Pelkas | Stadium: Theodoros Kolokotronis Stadium; Referee: Anastasios Sidiropoulos |

| 11 March 2018 25 | PAOK | 0–3 | AEK Athens | Thessaloniki |
| 19:30 EET, UTC+03:00 | Matos (yellow card) 4'; Campos (yellow card) 19'; Crespo (yellow card) 38'; Pelkas (yellow card) 57'; Maurício (yellow card) 86'; Varela 90' | Report | (yellow card) 9' Bakasetas; (yellow card) 25' Galo; (yellow card) 54' Araujo; (yellow card) 87' Christodoulopoulos | Stadium: Toumba Stadium; Referee: Georgios Kominis |
Note: Match was suspended at 90th minute with PAOK leading 1–0. AEK were awarded a 3–0 win and PAOK had 3 points deducted (as well as 2 points from next season's championship).

| 31 March 2018 26 | Atromitos | 0–2 | PAOK | Peristeri, Athens |
| 17:15 EET, UTC+03:00 | Risvanis (yellow card) 35'; Bruno (yellow card) 61' | Report | (yellow card) 23' Pelkas; 36' Campos; 56' Crespo; (yellow card) 73' Vieirinha; (yellow card) 74' Cañas; (yellow card) 89' Mak | Stadium: Peristeri Stadium; Referee: Athanasios Tzilos |

| 14 April 2018 27 | PAOK | 3–1 | Panionios | Thessaloniki |
| 19:30 EET, UTC+03:00 | Shakhov 02'; El Kaddouri 15'; Mak (yellow card) 61'; Prijović 66'; Matos (yellow card) 77' | Report | 66'Durmishaj | Stadium: Toumba Stadium; Attendance: C. doors Referee: Georgios Tzovaras |

| 22 April 2018 28 | PAOK | 2–1 | Xanthi | Thessaloniki |
| 19:00 EET, UTC+03:00 | Varela (yellow card) 28'; Crespo (yellow card) 50'; Biseswar 68'; Prijović (yellow card) 83'; Koulouris 85' | Report | (yellow card) 16' Castro; 16' Jendrišek; (yellow card) 30' Đuričković; (yellow card) 45' Sylla | Stadium: Toumba Stadium; Attendance: C. doors Referee: Aristidis Vatsios |

| 29 April 2018 29 | Panathinaikos | 0–3 | PAOK | Athens |
| 19:00 EET, UTC+03:00 | Theofanis Tzandaris (yellow card) 56'; Emanuel Insúa (yellow card) 61'; Luciano (yellow card) 65' | Report | 27' 65' Prijović; (yellow card) 38' Leo Matos; 84' Shakhov | Stadium: Leoforos Alexandras Stadium; Referee: Athanasios Tzilos |

| 6 May 2018 30 | PAOK | 3–0 | Platanias | Thessaloniki |
| 19:00 EET, UTC+03:00 | Dimitrios Pelkas 9' (yellow card) 11'; Prijovic 15' 90+3' | Report | | Stadium: Toumba Stadium; Referee: Dimitrios Karantonis |

=== Greek Cup ===
==== Group stage ====
| Pos | Team | Pld | W | D | L | GF | GA | GD | Pts | Qualification | PAOK | LEV | APP | AIG |
|---|---|---|---|---|---|---|---|---|---|---|---|---|---|---|
| 1 | PAOK | 3 | 3 | 0 | 0 | 8 | 1 | +7 | 9 | Round of 16 | | 2–1 | — | — |
| 2 | Levadiakos | 3 | 2 | 0 | 1 | 8 | 3 | +5 | 6 | Round of 16 | — | | — | 5–0 |
| 3 | Apollon Pontus | 3 | 1 | 0 | 2 | 2 | 3 | −1 | 3 | | 0–1 | 1–2 | | — |
| 4 | Aiginiakos | 3 | 0 | 0 | 3 | 0 | 11 | −11 | 0 | | 0–5 | — | 0–1 | |

Source: epo.gr
Rules for classification: 1) points, 2) head-to-head points, 3) head-to-head goal difference, 4) head-to-head best offense, 5) overall goal difference, 6) overall best offense, 7) overall best defense

Win Draw Loss

| 20 September 2017 1 | PAOK | 2–1 | Levadiakos | Thessaloniki |
| 18:15 EET, UTC+03:00 | Pelkas (penalty missed) 40' 41'; Zambrano (yellow card) 44'; Shakhov 71' | Report | (yellow card) 44' Belghazouani; 46' Giakoumakis; (yellow card) 64' Kaltsas; (yellow card) 83' Adilehou | Stadium: Kaftanzoglio Stadium; Attendance: Behind closed doors Referee: Alexandros Tsamouris |

| 25 October 2017 2 | Apollon Pontus | 0–1 | PAOK | Thessaloniki |
| 19:30 EET, UTC+03:00 | Georgiadis (yellow card) 73'; Vergonis (yellow card) 73' | Report | (yellow card) 43' Biseswar; (yellow card) 67' Deligiannidis; 90' Mak | Stadium: Kalamaria Stadium; Referee: Stefanos Koubarakis |

| 29 November 2017 3 | Aiginiakos | 0–5 | PAOK | Thessaloniki |
| 15:00 EET, UTC+03:00 | Karakostas (yellow card) 33'; Andrikopoulos (yellow card) 38' | Report | 5' Limnios; 53', 67' Prijović; (yellow card) 58' Zambrano; 71' El Kaddouri; 82' Shakhov | Stadium: Kaftanzoglio Stadium; Referee: Konstantinos Kotsanis (Drama) |

==== Round of 16 ====
| 19 December 2017 1st leg | Trikala | 1–5 | PAOK | Trikala |
| 19:30 EET, UTC+03:00 | Panos 16'; Andreopoulos (yellow card) 18'; Kapos (yellow card) 18' | Report | 5', 58' Matos; (yellow card) 45' Deligiannidis; (yellow card) 48' (goal) 70' Biseswar; 80' Campos; 90+4' Shakhov | Stadium: Trikala Municipal Stadium; Referee: Vasilis Fotias (Pella) |

| 9 January 2018 2nd leg | PAOK | 2–1 (7–2 agg.) | Trikala | Thessaloniki |
| 17:15 EET, UTC+03:00 | Crespo (yellow card) 8'; Prijović 78', 90+4' (pen.) | Report | (yellow card) 36' Tsiaras; 90+1' Milosavljev | Stadium: Toumba Stadium; Referee: Fotis Fotiadis (Kastoria) |

==== Quarter-finals ====
| 24 January 2018 First leg | PAOK | 2–0 | Atromitos | Thessaloniki |
| 21:45 EET, UTC+03:00 | Pelkas 18'; Matos (yellow card) 24'; Shakhov 86' | Report | (yellow card) 7' Kivrakidis; (yellow card) 70' Bušuladžić | Stadium: Toumba Stadium; Referee: Athanasios Tzilos |

| 8 February 2018 Second leg | Atromitos | 1–3 (1–5 agg.) | PAOK | Peristeri, Athens |
| 19:30 EET, UTC+03:00 | Bušuladžić (yellow card) 24'; Vasilakakis 54'; Sakic (yellow card) 60' | Report | 30' Shakhov; 68' Cañas; 79' Koulouris | Stadium: Peristeri Stadium; Referee: Dimitrios Styliaras |

==== Semi-finals ====
| 28 February 2018 First leg | Panionios | 1–3 | PAOK | Nea Smyrni, Athens |
| 19:30 EET, UTC+03:00 | Vlachos (yellow card) 37'; Masouras (yellow card) 52'; Stavropoulos (yellow card) 56'; Korbos 85' | Report | 24' Maurício; 34' Prijović; (yellow card) 44' Limnios; 73' Biseswar | Stadium: Nea Smyrni Stadium; Referee: Emmanouil Skoulas |

| 17 April 2018 Second leg | PAOK | 3–1 (6–2 agg.) | Panionios | Thessaloniki |
| 19:00 EET, UTC+03:00 | Koulouris 21'; Pelkas 68'; Prijović 80' (pen.) | Report | (yellow card) 33' (yellow-red card) 70' Makrillos; 40' Masouras; (yellow card) 45+1' Giorgos Saramantas | Stadium: Toumba Stadium; Referee: Athanasios Sezos |

==== Final ====
| 12 May 2018 Final | AEK Athens | 0–2 | PAOK | Athens |
| 20:30 EET | Marko Livaja (yellow card) 46'; Anastasios Bakasetas (yellow card) 71'; Vranješ (yellow card) 64' (yellow-red card) 80'; Kostas Galanopoulos (yellow card) 90' | Report | (yellow card) 6' Djalma Campos; (yellow card) 20' Léo Matos; (penalty missed) 25' Prijovic; (yellow card) 45+1' José Ángel Crespo; 65' (yellow card) 65' Vieirinha; (red card) 80' Mauricio; 90+2' (yellow card) 90+4' Pelkas; (red card) 90+4' Fernando Varela | Stadium: Athens Olympic Stadium; Attendance: 35,545; Referee: David Fernández Borbalán (Spain); Man of the Match: Vieirinha |

=== UEFA Europa League ===
==== Third qualifying round ====
Win Draw Loss

| 27 July 2017 First leg | Olimpik Donetsk (Ukraine) | 1–1 | (Greece) PAOK | Kyiv, Ukraine |
| 19:30 EET, UTC+03:00 | Bilenkyi 49'; Kravchenko (yellow card) 70' | UEFA Report | (yellow card) 53' Shakhov; 59' Henrique; (yellow card) 73' Leovac | Stadium: Valeriy Lobanovskyi Dynamo Stadium; Attendance: 2,632; Referee: (Switzerland) Alain Bieri |

| 3 August 2017 Second leg | PAOK (Greece) | 2–0 (3–1 agg.) | (Ukraine) Olimpik Donetsk | Thessaloniki, Greece |
| 21:00 EET, UTC+03:00 | Mak 24'; Cimirot 45+1'; Leovac (yellow card) 60' | UEFA Report | (yellow card) 4' Nyemchaninov; (yellow card) 51' Tsymbalyuk; (yellow card) 58'Kravchenko | Stadium: Toumba Stadium; Attendance: 13,960; Referee: (Bulgaria) Ivaylo Stoyanov |

==== Play-off round ====
Win Draw Loss

| 17 August 2017 First leg | PAOK (Greece) | 3–1 | (Sweden) Östersund | Thessaloniki, Greece |
| 21:00 EET, UTC+03:00 | Rey (yellow card) 21'; Matos 38'; Prijović 77', 88' (pen.) | UEFA Report | 21' (pen.) Nouri; (yellow card) 37' Mukiibi; (yellow card) 87' Keita | Stadium: Toumba Stadium; Attendance: – Referee: (Netherlands) Bas Nijhuis |

| 24 August 2017 Second leg | Östersund (Sweden) | 2–0 (3 (a) –3 agg.) | (Greece) PAOK | Östersund, Sweden |
| 20:00 EET, UTC+03:00 | Mukiibi (yellow card) 19'; Pettersson (yellow card) 68'; Ghoddos 71', 77'; Hopcutt (yellow card) 84'; Edwards (yellow card) 90'; Aiesh (yellow card) 90+4' | UEFA Report | (yellow card) 20' Matos; (yellow card) 27' Prijović; (yellow card) 70' Pedro Henrique; (yellow card) 77' Cimirot | Stadium: Jämtkraft Arena; Referee: (Poland) Paweł Raczkowski |

== Statistics ==
=== Squad statistics ===
As of 12 May 2018

Appearances denote players in the starting lineup, with the numbers in parentheses denoting appearances as substitute.

| No. | Name | Super League | | Greek Cup | | Europa League | | Total | |
| No. | Name | Apps | Goals | Apps | Goals | Apps | Goals | Apps | Goals |
Goalkeepers
| 1 | (Argentina) Rodrigo Rey | 12 | 0 | 2 | 0 | 4 | 0 | 18 | 0 |
| 31 | (Greece) Alexandros Paschalakis | 17 | 0 | 7 | 0 | 0 | 0 | 24 | 0 |
| 99 | (Greece) Marios Siampanis | 0 | 0 | 1 | 0 | 0 | 0 | 1 | 0 |
Defenders
| 3 | (Brazil) Léo Matos | 27 | 4 | 7 | 2 | 4 | 1 | 38 | 7 |
| 5 | (Cape Verde) Fernando Varela | 26 | 2 | 6 | 0 | 4 | 0 | 36 | 2 |
| 6 | (France) Dorian Lévêque | 1 | 0 | 0 | 0 | 0 | 0 | 1 | 0 |
| 13 | (Greece) Stelios Malezas | 7 (1) | 1 | 9 | 0 | 0 | 0 | 16 (1) | 1 |
| 15 | (Spain) José Ángel Crespo | 23 (1) | 2 | 5 (1) | 0 | 4 | 0 | 32 (2) | 2 |
| 16 | (Bosnia and Herzegovina) Marko Mihojević | 1 | 0 | 0 | 0 | 0 | 0 | 1 | 0 |
| 30 | (Brazil) Márcio Azevedo | 4 (3) | 0 | 3 | 0 | 0 | 0 | 7 (3) | 0 |
| 41 | (Greece) Panagiotis Deligiannidis | 0 | 0 | 5 | 0 | 0 | 0 | 5 | 0 |
| 44 | (Greece) Achilleas Poungouras | 1 (1) | 0 | 2 | 0 | 0 | 0 | 3 (1) | 0 |
Midfielders
| 7 | (Morocco) Omar El Kaddouri | 18 (4) | 1 | 3 (3) | 1 | 0 | 0 | 21 (7) | 2 |
| 8 | (Brazil) Maurício | 22 (2) | 3 | 5 | 1 | 0 | 0 | 27 (2) | 4 |
| 21 | (Suriname) Diego Biseswar | 20 (15) | 1 | 8 (2) | 2 | 4 (1) | 0 | 32 (18) | 3 |
| 28 | (Ukraine) Yevhen Shakhov | 19 (11) | 3 | 10 (3) | 5 | 4 (1) | 0 | 33 (15) | 8 |
| 34 | (Greece) Georgios Vrakas | 0 | 0 | 1 | 0 | 0 | 0 | 1 | 0 |
| 75 | (France) Thibault Moulin | 2 (2) | 0 | 1 (1) | 0 | 0 | 0 | 3 (3) | 0 |
| 77 | (Greece) Dimitrios Pelkas | 23 (2) | 8 | 10 (1) | 4 | 3 (3) | 0 | 36 (6) | 12 |
| 87 | (Spain) José Cañas | 15 (1) | 0 | 5 (1) | 1 | 2 | 0 | 22 (2) | 1 |
| 88 | (Portugal) Vieirinha | 24 (1) | 1 | 5 (2) | 1 | 0 | 0 | 29 (3) | 2 |
Forwards
| 9 | (Serbia) Aleksandar Prijović | 27 (4) | 19 | 8 (3) | 6 | 4 | 2 | 39 (7) | 27 |
| 10 | (Angola) Djalma Campos | 23 (6) | 6 | 5 (4) | 1 | 4 | 0 | 32 (10) | 7 |
| 18 | (Greece) Dimitrios Limnios | 21 (10) | 0 | 9 | 1 | 1 (1) | 0 | 31 (11) | 1 |
| 20 | (Greece) Efthimis Koulouris | 13 (7) | 3 | 7 (3) | 2 | 1 (1) | 0 | 21 (11) | 5 |
| 29 | (Slovakia) Róbert Mak | 25 (12) | 3 | 7 (2) | 1 | 4 | 1 | 36 (14) | 5 |
Players transferred out during the season
| 33 | (Greece) Stefanos Athanasiadis | 0 | 0 | 0 | 0 | 1 (1) | 0 | 1 (1) | 0 |
| 11 | (Brazil) Pedro Henrique | 1 | 0 | 0 | 0 | 4 (4) | 1 | 5 (4) | 1 |
| 16 | (Bosnia and Herzegovina) Gojko Cimirot | 15 (3) | 0 | 4 | 0 | 4 | 1 | 23 (3) | 1 |
| 2 | (Peru) Carlos Zambrano | 6 | 0 | 2 | 0 | 0 | 0 | 8 | 0 |
| 26 | (Albania) Ergys Kaçe | 4 (1) | 0 | 1 (1) | 0 | 0 | 0 | 5 (2) | 0 |
| 27 | (Greece) Giannis Mystakidis | 0 | 0 | 2 (2) | 0 | 0 | 0 | 2 (2) | 0 |
| 4 | (Croatia) Marin Leovac | 9 | 1 | 0 | 0 | 4 | 0 | 13 | 1 |

=== Goalscorers ===
'Match played 12 May 2018.'

| Rank | No. | Pos. | Player | League | Cup | Europa League | Total |
|---|---|---|---|---|---|---|---|
| 1 | 9 | CF | (Serbia) Aleksandar Prijović | 19 | 6 | 2 | 27 |
| 2 | 77 | AM | (Greece) Dimitrios Pelkas | 8 | 4 | 0 | 12 |
| 3 | 28 | MF | (Ukraine) Yevhen Shakhov | 3 | 5 | 0 | 8 |
| 4 | 10 | MF | (Angola) Djalma Campos | 6 | 1 | 0 | 7 |
| 5 | 3 | RB | (Brazil) Leo Matos | 4 | 2 | 1 | 7 |
| 6 | 20 | CF | (Greece) Efthimis Koulouris | 3 | 2 | 0 | 5 |
| 7 | 29 | FW | (Slovakia) Róbert Mak | 3 | 1 | 1 | 5 |
| 8 | 8 | MF | (Brazil) Maurício | 3 | 1 | 0 | 4 |
| 9 | 21 | AMF | (Suriname) Diego Biseswar | 1 | 2 | 0 | 3 |
| 10 | 20 | CF | (Spain) José Ángel Crespo | 2 | 0 | 0 | 2 |
| 11 | 5 | CB | (Cape Verde) Fernando Varela | 2 | 0 | 0 | 2 |
| 12 | 7 | MF | (Morocco) Omar El Kaddouri | 1 | 1 | 0 | 2 |
| 13 | 88 | MF | (Portugal) Vieirinha | 1 | 1 | 0 | 2 |
| 14 | 13 | CB | (Greece) Stelios Malezas | 1 | 0 | 0 | 1 |
| 15 | 4 | LB | (Croatia) Marin Leovac | 1 | 0 | 0 | 1 |
| 16 | 18 | FW | (Greece) Dimitrios Limnios | 0 | 1 | 0 | 1 |
| 17 | 87 | DM | (Spain) José Cañas | 0 | 1 | 0 | 1 |
| 18 | 16 | MF | (Bosnia and Herzegovina) Gojko Cimirot | 0 | 0 | 1 | 1 |
| 19 | 11 | FW | (Brazil) Pedro Henrique | 0 | 0 | 1 | 1 |
| Own goals | | | | 2 | 0 | 0 | 2 |
| TOTALS | | | | 60 | 28 | 6 | 94 |

=== Clean sheets ===
Last updated on 6 May 2018.

| Rank | Name | Super League | Greek Cup | Europa League | Total | Games played |
|---|---|---|---|---|---|---|
| — | (Greece) Alexandros Paschalakis | 13 | 4 | 0 | 17 | 24 |
| — | (Argentina) Rodrigo Rey | 6 | 0 | 1 | 7 | 18 |
| Total | | 19 | 4 | 1 | 24 | 42 |

=== Disciplinary record ===
| S | P | N | Name | Super League | | | Cup | | | Europa League | | | Total | | |
| S | P | N | Name | Yellow card | Yellow-red card | Red card | Yellow card | Yellow-red card | Red card | Yellow card | Yellow-red card | Red card | Yellow card | Yellow-red card | Red card |
|---|---|---|---|---|---|---|---|---|---|---|---|---|---|---|---|
| 77 | AM | (Greece) | Dimitrios Pelkas | 5 | 0 | 0 | 0 | 0 | 0 | 0 | 0 | 0 | 5 | 0 | 0 |
| 8 | MF | (Brazil) | Maurício | 4 | 0 | 0 | 0 | 0 | 0 | 0 | 0 | 0 | 4 | 0 | 0 |
| 28 | MF | (Ukraine) | Yevhen Shakhov | 5 | 0 | 0 | 0 | 0 | 0 | 1 | 0 | 0 | 6 | 0 | 0 |
| 26 | DM | (Albania) | Ergys Kaçe | 2 | 0 | 0 | 0 | 0 | 0 | 0 | 0 | 0 | 2 | 0 | 0 |
| 3 | DF | (Brazil) | Leo Matos | 3 | 0 | 0 | 1 | 0 | 0 | 1 | 0 | 0 | 5 | 0 | 0 |
| 2 | DF | (Peru) | Carlos Zambrano | 1 | 1 | 0 | 2 | 0 | 0 | 0 | 0 | 0 | 3 | 1 | 0 |
| 9 | CF | (Serbia) | Aleksandar Prijović | 4 | 0 | 0 | 0 | 0 | 0 | 1 | 0 | 0 | 5 | 0 | 0 |
| 4 | LB | (Croatia) | Marin Leovac | 0 | 0 | 0 | 0 | 0 | 0 | 2 | 0 | 0 | 2 | 0 | 0 |
| 29 | AM | (Slovakia) | Róbert Mak | 1 | 0 | 1 | 0 | 0 | 0 | 0 | 0 | 0 | 1 | 0 | 1 |
| 13 | DF | (Greece) | Stelios Malezas | 1 | 0 | 0 | 0 | 0 | 0 | 0 | 0 | 0 | 1 | 0 | 0 |
| 15 | DF | (Spain) | José Ángel Crespo | 2 | 0 | 0 | 1 | 0 | 0 | 0 | 0 | 0 | 3 | 0 | 0 |
| 87 | ΜF | (Spain) | José Cañas | 2 | 0 | 0 | 0 | 0 | 0 | 0 | 0 | 0 | 2 | 0 | 0 |
| 7 | MF | (Morocco) | Omar El Kaddouri | 3 | 0 | 0 | 0 | 0 | 0 | 0 | 0 | 0 | 3 | 0 | 0 |
| 16 | MF | (Bosnia and Herzegovina) | Gojko Cimirot | 2 | 0 | 0 | 0 | 0 | 0 | 1 | 0 | 0 | 3 | 0 | 0 |
| 1 | GK | (Argentina) | Rodrigo Rey | 1 | 0 | 0 | 0 | 0 | 0 | 1 | 0 | 0 | 2 | 0 | 0 |
| 11 | W | (Brazil) | Pedro Henrique | 0 | 0 | 0 | 0 | 0 | 0 | 1 | 0 | 0 | 1 | 0 | 0 |
| 20 | CF | (Greece) | Efthimis Koulouris | 0 | 0 | 1 | 0 | 0 | 0 | 0 | 0 | 0 | 0 | 0 | 1 |
| 21 | MF | (Suriname) | Diego Biseswar | 1 | 0 | 1 | 2 | 0 | 0 | 0 | 0 | 0 | 3 | 0 | 1 |
| 41 | MF | (Greece) | Panagiotis Deligiannidis | 0 | 0 | 0 | 2 | 0 | 0 | 0 | 0 | 0 | 2 | 0 | 0 |
| 18 | FW | (Greece) | Dimitrios Limnios | 3 | 0 | 0 | 0 | 0 | 0 | 0 | 0 | 0 | 3 | 0 | 0 |
| 88 | FW | (Portugal) | Vieirinha | 2 | 0 | 0 | 0 | 0 | 0 | 0 | 0 | 0 | 2 | 0 | 0 |
| 5 | DF | (Cape Verde) | Fernando Varela | 1 | 0 | 0 | 0 | 0 | 0 | 0 | 0 | 0 | 1 | 0 | 0 |
