= Aleksandar Prijović =

Serbian footballer (born 1990)

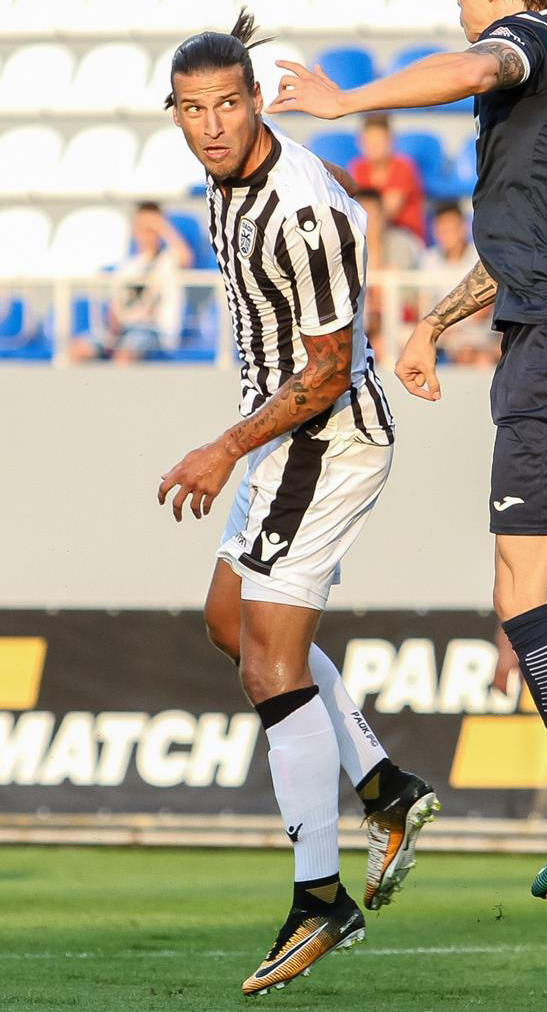
- Prijović with PAOK in 2017

Personal information
- Full name: Aleksandar Prijović
- Date of birth: 21 April 1990 (age 36)
- Place of birth: St. Gallen, Switzerland
- Height: 1.91 m (6 ft 3 in)
- Position: Forward

Youth career
- St. Gallen

Senior career*
Years	Team	Apps	(Gls)
2006–2008	Parma	1	(0)
2008–2010	Derby County	0	(0)
2009	→ Yeovil Town (loan)	4	(0)
2009	→ Northampton Town (loan)	10	(2)
2010–2013	Sion	41	(6)
2012	→ Lausanne-Sport (loan)	10	(0)
2012–2013	→ Tromsø (loan)	26	(4)
2013–2014	Djurgårdens IF	27	(10)
2014–2015	Boluspor	31	(16)
2015–2017	Legia Warsaw	44	(13)
2017–2019	PAOK	56	(35)
2019–2021	Al-Ittihad	49	(15)
2021–2023	Western United	43	(18)
Total		342	(119)

International career
2007	Serbia U17	3	(1)
2007	Serbia U19	3	(0)
2010	Switzerland U20	2	(1)
2011	Switzerland U21	2	(0)
2017–2019	Serbia	13	(2)
- * Club domestic league appearances and goals as of 2 May 2023

Aleksandar Prijović (Serbian Cyrillic: Александар Пpиjoвић, pronounced [aleksǎːndar prǐːjoʋitɕ, alěksaːn-]; born 21 April 1990) is a former professional footballer who played as a striker. Born in Switzerland, Prijović played for both his country of birth and Serbia as a youth international, before switching to represent the latter at senior level.

== Club career ==
=== Early career ===
Prijović started his career as a youth player with his hometown club St. Gallen but moved to Italy at the age of 16 to start his football career with Italian side Parma, making the first appearance of his career as a substitute for Parma on 27 April 2008 in a match against Reggina. Prijović's contract with Parma finished at the end of the 2007–08 Serie A season and he rejected the offer of a new one-year deal with the club.

=== Derby County ===
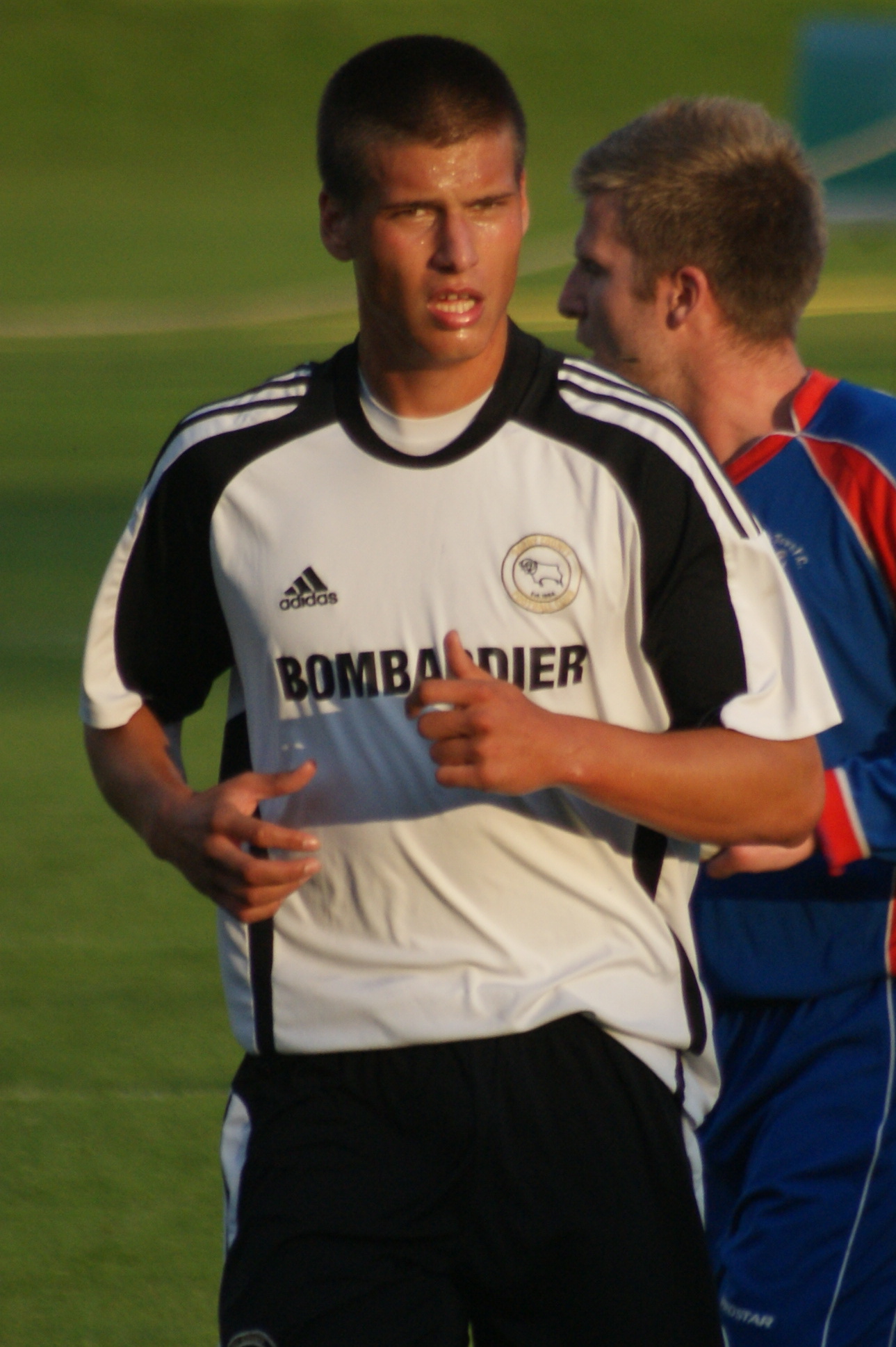
Aleksandar Prijović with Derby County in 2008

Prijović went on trial with English Championship side Derby County where he caught the eye by scoring a hat-trick as Derby's academy side beat Arsenal youth 4–1. Derby offered Prijović a two-year contract. He provisionally signed for Derby on 7 August 2008, subject to international clearance. His full signing was delayed by issues over international clearance, firstly following disagreements over the player's registration which was sorted when Derby agreed to pay Prijović's former club, Parma, an undisclosed amount as compensation and then by the Swiss army, who made Prijović return home to complete his spell with them. On 27 January 2009, Prijović joined League One Yeovil Town on a months loan, playing four times before returning early due to illness.

On 16 March, Prijović joined Northampton Town on loan for a month. He made his debut in the 4–0 win over Stockport County and impressed the fans. He scored his first professional goal in the 3–2 defeat to Southend United. He then scored his second in the 3–1 victory away at Leyton Orient.

On 6 July 2009, he was called for a trial period with Germany-based club MSV Duisburg before he joined OB Odense on a similar deal in November 2009, where he impressed with a goal in a trial match. Of Prijović, Derby boss Nigel Clough said "They are very interested in taking him in January so we are just trying to get a deal done if they want to do one. If not, we will probably look to get him out on loan. If we can do it before the deadline, we will do. If not, in January." He eventually signed for FC Sion for a nominal fee on 1 February 2010.

=== Sion ===
While on loan at Lausanne, he went on a trial with the Norwegian club, Molde at their training camp in Marbella, Spain in February 2012. He played one match for Molde, the pre-season match against the Spanish club Xerez CD, but was not offered a contract.

On 31 July 2012, Tromsø signed Prijović on a one-year loan deal, with an option to buy. Tromsø's head coach Per-Mathias Høgmo stated that Molde's manager Ole Gunnar Solskjær and coach Mark Dempsey had recommended Prijovic after the trial. Prijović got his debut coming in off the bench for the last 22 minutes of an away loss to Fredrikstad on 5 August. Four days later he made his first start and scored his first goal in the away leg of the third qualifying round of the 2012–13 UEFA Europa League against Metalurh Donetsk, ensuring a 2–1 aggregate win for Tromsø.

Tromsø could not afford to extend Prijović' loan-deal, and he returned to Sion when the loan-deal expired on 1 July 2013.

=== Djurgårdens IF ===
On 15 August 2013, Prijović signed a 2 1/2-year contract with the Stockholm-based club Djurgårdens IF, where he was reunited with his coach from Tromsø, Per-Mathias Høgmo. In his starting debut for Djurgårdens IF Prijović scored a hattrick, when IFK Norrköping was beaten 3–2.

=== Legia Warsaw ===
On 9 July 2015, Prijović joined Legia Warsaw on a four-year deal. During the 2015–16 Polish Cup Final on 2 May 2016, he scored the match winner in the 69th minute to defeat Lech Poznan 1–0. On 22 November 2016, he scored two goals in the 2016–17 Champions League group match against Borussia Dortmund as his team lost 8–4 away from home.

=== PAOK ===
==== 2016–17 ====
On 16 January 2017, Prijović left Legia Warsaw to join Greek Super League club PAOK on a 4 1/2-year contract. The reported transfer fee paid to Warsaw was €1.9 million plus 10% of a future transfer fee, receiving an annual income of €850,000. He started being the undisputed leader of the club's offence. He scored on his debut in a Greek Cup game against Panetolikos. On 19 February 2017, he scored a brace (pen. 42', 50'), PAOK won easily 4–0 against Veria at Toumba Stadium.

On 16 March 2017, Prijovic suffered a shoulder injury and underwent a successful operation, which the club confirmed. The Serbian striker picked an injury in his shoulder and he is set to miss the next six weeks. PAOK confirmed that Prijovic went under knife successfully and he will start rehabilitation imminently. Prior to his injury, has only featured in 10 games, but he is already leading the scoring charts of PAOK with seven goals.

==== 2017–18 ====
On 17 August 2017, he helped PAOK to complete a remarkable turnaround to defeat Östersunds FK 3–1 at Toumba Stadium scoring a brace in the second half of the 1st leg of the UEFA Europa League play-offs. On 28 August 2017, he scored his first goal of the 2017–18 season in a 3–1 home win game against Kerkyra. On 16 September 2017, thanks to a header by Serbian international striker, PAOK won 1–0 Panetolikos at Toumba Stadium. A week later, he scored the only goal in a 1–0 home win game against PAS Giannina. On 15 October 2017, he scored a brace in a 4–0 home win game against Lamia On 10 December 2017, came as a late substitute, he scored in a 4–0 home win game against rivals Panathinaikos.

During the 2017–18 season, Prijovic's brilliant form for both club and country has attracted interest from foreign teams. Rumours are circling that Prijovic is in demand, but it's doubtful that PAOK would be willing to sell, especially given the difficulty of finding a worthy replacement. PAOK fans are hoping that Prijovic can continue firing on all cylinders as the Greek title race heats up. On 6 January 2018, he scored a brace in a glorious 5–0 home win game against Levadiakos On 9 January 2018, Prijovic netted home a penalty in the fourth minute of second half stoppage to give PAOK a 2–1 victory over Trikala in their second leg fixture in the Greek Cup, scoring for second time in the game. On 21 January 2018, Prijović scored in the first minute of added time in a hammering 3–0 home win game against Apollon Smyrnis. On 28 January 2018, PAOK managed to gain a 1–0 away win against Panetolikos thanks to a late penalty which was converted by Aleksandar Prijovic. The Serbian striker slotted home from 12 yards past Dimitris Kyriakidis after PAOK's cape Verde defender Fernando Varela had been impeded by Panetolikos' Albanian defender Enea Mihaj. On 3 February 2018, he scored a brace in a crucial 3–1 away win against PAS Giannina, and PAOK remain in first place of Super League on the road to the title of 2017–18 season. On 12 February 2018, Prijovic rounding off the scoring with a powerful finish three minutes after the half-time interval, in a 3–0 home win game against AEL. It was a crucial victory in PAOK's effort to win the title after 33 years.

On 27 February 2018, an official transfer bid from Chinese club Henan Jianye arrived at the headquarters of the Greek Cup winners about the 28-year-old Serbian for an estimated amount of €9 million, but PAOK was not interested in selling him and Aleksandar Prijović also decided to remain at Super League, with a contract ran until the summer of 2022 worth €1.5 million per year and contained a €10 million buy-out clause, even if the Chinese team were offering him the same contract with a lucrative annual salary of €4 million. On 28 February 2018, Prijovic deservedly doubled PAOK's advantage in a 3–1 away win against Panionios in the Greek Cup semi-final, planting a bullet header expertly beyond the helpless Matic Kotnik from Dimitrios Limnios' left-wing cross. On 4 March 2017, he scored with a penalty kick against Asteras Tripolis at the delays equalising for PAOK, but in the next minute Walter Iglesias scored and PAOK suffered a 3–2 away loss in its effort to win the Super League title. On 14 April 2018, he scored to finish off a superb 11-pass move which started from the PAOK backline, in a 3–1 home win game against Panionios. On 29 April 2018, he scored a brace in a triumphant 3–0 away win against struggling giants Panathinaikos, essentially occupied the second place in the 2017–18 season that leads in the preliminary round of UEFA Champions League. Prijović, who scored a double against the Greens, has now scored 25 goals in all competitions this season and has surpassed former PAOK striker Stefanos Athanasiadis' record of 23 goals in one Super League season set back in the 2012–13 season (from 42 games across all competitions). On 5 May 2018, in a comfortable 3–0 home victory over relegated Platanias at the Toumba Stadium, the Serbian marksman scored a brace and his 19th league goal of what has been an incredible season, as PAOK will join champions AEK in the Champions League qualifiers.

==== 2018–19 ====
On 25 July 2018, Prijovic doubles PAOK lead from Limnios cross late on, in a 2–1 home win game in the UEFA Champions League Second qualifying round, 1st leg against FC Basel. On 1 August 2018, Prijovic scored with a right footed shot from the centre of the box to the high centre of the goal, giving a two goals lead to PAOK in a triumphant 3–0 away win against FC Basel. On 8 August 2018, Prijovic scored with a penalty kick in a 3–2 home win game in the Champions League Third qualifying round, 1st leg against Spartak Moskva. On 25 August 2018, he scored with a penalty kick after winning the spot-kick, sealing a 1–0 home Super League win game against Asteras Tripolis. On 23 September 2018, he scored a brace being the MVP of the game in a 2-0 derby win home game against champions AEK Athens. On 4 October 2018, he opened the score in a 4–1 away emphatic win against BATE Borisov in Belarus in the UEFA Europa League Group stage. On 21 October 2018, PAOK fought back from a goal down to clinch a 2–1 win over Aris in a pulsating Salonica derby, maintaining their 100 per cent record in the Super League with a seventh straight win, as Prijovic scored twice to cancel out Mateo García's early opener. A week later, Prijovic opened the scoring six minutes after half-time after an assist from Léo Jabá in a 2–0 home win game against rivals Panathinaikos. On 25 November 2018, Prijovic scored from close range with a trademark header after an assist from Vieirinha, just seconds after coming on to replace Stelios Kitsiou, in a 2–0 home win game against Xanthi helping his club to secure a 10th win in 11 games for Răzvan Lucescu's record-breaking team. On 13 December 2018, he pulled a goal back from close range after a great run from Jabá in a frustrated 3-1 Europa League home loss against BATE Borisov. Prijovic is continuing to capture the headlines in Thessaloniki, becoming the quickest player in PAOK history to score 50 goals, in just 83 appearances. He overpassed Kostas Frantzeskos who held the record with 50 markers in 99 appearances. On 17 December 2018, the Serbian international beat Vladimir Bajić with a superb volleyed effort from Jabá's lofted pass into the penalty area, opening the score in a 2–1 away win against Levadiakos. On 20 December 2018, he scored a hat-trick in a comfortable 6–0 away win against Aittitos Spata in the Greek Cup.

=== Al Ittihad ===
On the first days of January 2019, reports suggested that Prijovic will join the Saudi Arabia club Al Ittihad. After medical in Saudi Arabia, he would travel to Thessaloniki for a crunch meeting with PAOK's owner Ivan Savvidis, but it never happened. Instead, Prijovic, decided to fly back to the Serbian capital of Belgrade, and in the next couple of days, he will travel to Jeddah, Saudi Arabia to be officially unveiled as a player of Al Ittihad. The Saudis have met the transfer clause of €10 million from PAOK, and during negotiations in Dubai, they struck an agreement with Prijovic. According to media sources, Al Ittihad will pay the release clause in four separate instalments of €2.5 million over the course of the next three months. On 8 March 2019, he scored a brace - his first goals with the club - in a 2–0 home win game against Al-Fayha FC.

=== Western United ===
On 15 October 2021, Prijović signed a multi-year contract, joining Western United in the A-League. On 13 November 2021, he scored in his first appearance with the club, helping his club to win its first ever FFA Cup match, advancing to the Round of 32 after a hard-fought 2–1 win over Newcastle Jets.

In September 2023, Prijović left Western United in order to pursue opportunities elsewhere. Prijović departed the club as their second highest all-time scorer, having registered 19 goals and 7 assists in 44 appearances in all competitions.

== International career ==
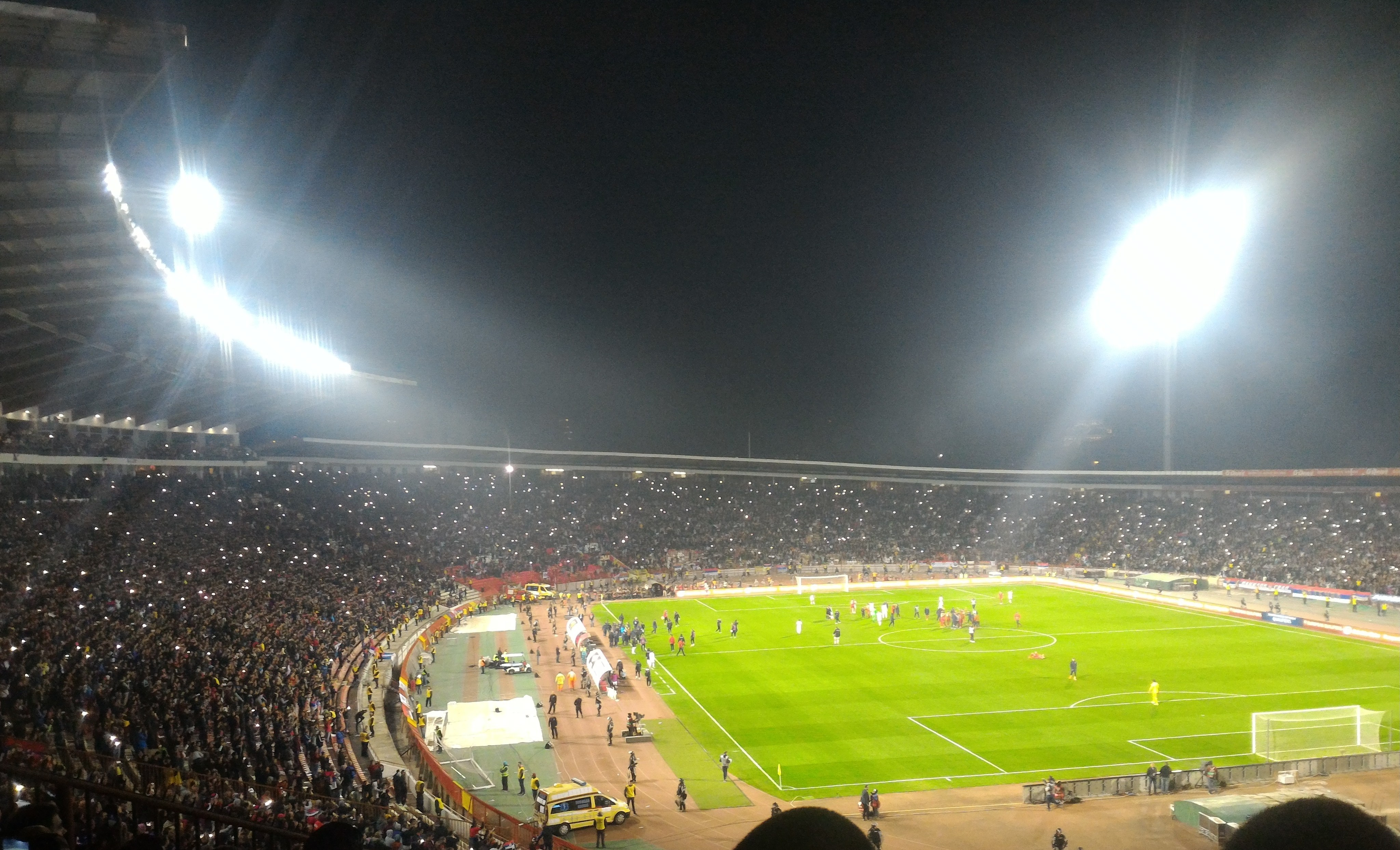
Prijović scored the winning goal versus Georgia thus clinching Serbia's qualification for the 2018 World Cup — the country's first major tournament appearance after eight years and three unsuccessful qualifying campaigns.

Though born in Switzerland, Prijović is an ethnic Serb and chose to represent Serbia at both the U17 and U19 levels. He played six competitive games in total.

He switched allegiance to Switzerland in 2010. He scored in his debut with the Switzerland under-20 side on 28 April. He collected his second cap on 6 September 2010.

Prijović made his Swiss U21 debut on 10 August 2011. He also played in the next match on 1 September 2011, his only competitive under-21 match.

In February 2017, Prijović made an official request to FIFA for permission to play for the Serbia national team. On 20 March, he received confirmation from FIFA that he was allowed to play for Serbia, which was confirmed by the national coach Slavoljub Muslin. On 12 May, Muslin officially confirmed that Prijović will be part of the team in the upcoming 2018 FIFA World Cup qualification match against Wales. He made his debut in the match and logged an assist for 1–1.

On 9 October 2017, in the last qualification match in the group, Prijović scored his first goal with the national team (sliding in a cross from Aleksandar Mitrović) as Serbia defeated Georgia and returned to the World Cup after an eight-year drought.

In June 2018, he was included in the final 23-man squad for the 2018 FIFA World Cup, where he appeared in a match against Costa Rica.

== Career statistics ==
=== Club ===
Appearances and goals by club, season and competition
Club	Season	League			National cup (Note: Includes Swiss Cup, Norwegian Cup, Svenska Cupen, Polish Cup, Greek Football Cup, King Cup, Australia Cup)		Continental		Other		Total	
Club	Season	Division	Apps	Goals	Apps	Goals	Apps	Goals	Apps	Goals	Apps	Goals
Parma	2007–08	Serie A	1	0	0	0	—		—		1	0
Yeovil (loan)	2008–09	League One	4	0	0	0	—		—		4	0
Northampton (loan)	2008–09	League One	10	2	0	0	—		—		10	2
Sion	2009–10	Swiss Super League	10	0	0	0	—		—		10	0
Sion	2010–11	Swiss Super League	25	6	4	1	—		—		29	7
Sion	2011–12	Swiss Super League	6	0	0	0	1 (Note: Appearance(s) in UEFA Europa League)	0	—		7	0
Sion	Total		41	6	4	1	1	0	—		46	7
Lausanne-Sport (loan)	2011–12	Swiss Super League	10	0	2	1	—		—		12	1
Tromsø (loan)	2012	Tippeligaen	13	3	3	0	3	2	—		19	5
Tromsø (loan)	2013	Tippeligaen	13	1	3	4	2	0	—		18	5
Tromsø (loan)	Total		26	4	6	4	5	2	—		37	10
Djurgården	2013	Allsvenskan	10	5	1	0	—		—		11	5
Djurgården	2014	Allsvenskan	17	5	2	0	—		—		19	5
Djurgården	Total		27	10	3	0	—		—		30	10
Boluspor	2014–15	TFF First League	31	16	0	0	—		—		31	16
Legia Warsaw	2015–16	Ekstraklasa	30	8	6	5	11	3	—		47	16
Legia Warsaw	2016–17	Ekstraklasa	14	5	1	0	9 (Note: Appearances in UEFA Champions League)	3	1 (Note: Appearance in Polish Super Cup)	0	25	8
Legia Warsaw	Total		44	13	7	5	20	6	1	0	72	24
PAOK	2016–17	Super League Greece	15	7	5	3	—		—		20	10
PAOK	2017–18	Super League Greece	28	19	8	6	4	2	—		40	27
PAOK	2018–19	Super League Greece	13	9	2	3	12 (Note: Six appearances and four goals in UEFA Champions League, six appearances and two goals in UEFA Europa League)	6	—		27	18
PAOK	Total		56	35	15	12	16	8	—		87	55
Al-Ittihad	2018–19	Saudi Pro League	11	7	3	4	0	0	—		14	11
Al-Ittihad	2019–20	Saudi Pro League	10	1	2	1	0	0	4 (Note: Appearances in Arab Club Champions Cup)	2	16	4
Al-Ittihad	2020–21	Saudi Pro League	28	7	2	2	0	0	—		30	9
Al-Ittihad	Total		49	15	7	7	0	0	4	2	60	24
Western United FC	2021–22	A-League Men	27	13	1	1	0	0	—		28	14
Western United FC	2022–23	A-League Men	16	5	0	0	0	0	—		16	5
Western United FC	Total		43	18	1	1	0	0	—		44	19
Career total			342	119	45	31	42	16	5	2	434	168

=== International ===
Appearances and goals by national team and year
National team	Year	Apps	Goals
Serbia	2017	7	1
Serbia	2018	5	1
Serbia	2019	1	0
Total		13	2

Scores and results list Serbia's goal tally first, score column indicates score after each Prijović goal.

List of international goals scored by Aleksandar Prijović
No.	Date	Venue	Cap	Opponent	Score	Result	Competition
1	9 October 2017	Red Star Stadium, Belgrade, Serbia	5	Georgia	1–0	1–0	2018 FIFA World Cup qualification
2	20 November 2018	Partizan Stadium, Belgrade, Serbia	12	Lithuania	3–1	4–1	2018–19 UEFA Nations League C

== Honours ==
Sion

- Swiss Cup: 2010–11

Legia Warsaw

- Ekstraklasa: 2015–16
- Polish Cup: 2015–16

PAOK

- Greek Cup: 2016–17, 2017–18

Western United

- A-League Men Championship: 2021–22

Individual

- Ekstraklasa Player of the Month: April 2016
- Super League Greece top scorer: 2017–18
- Greek Cup top scorer: 2017–18
- Joe Marston Medal: 2022
