= José Cañas =

Spanish footballer (born 1987)

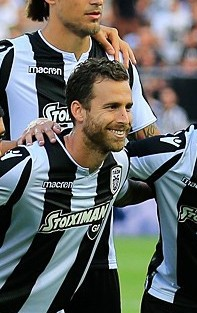
- Cañas in 2018

Personal information
- Full name: José Alberto Cañas Ruiz-Herrera
- Date of birth: 27 May 1987 (age 39)
- Place of birth: Rota, Spain
- Height: 1.78 m (5 ft 10 in)
- Position: Defensive midfielder

Team information
- Current team: Glacis United
- Number: 10

Youth career
- Roteña
- 2004–2005: Betis

Senior career*
Years	Team	Apps	(Gls)
2005–2007	Betis C	51	(6)
2006–2010	Betis B	97	(4)
2009–2013	Betis	66	(0)
2013–2014	Swansea City	23	(0)
2014–2016	Espanyol	42	(0)
2016–2019	PAOK	56	(1)
2019–2020	Red Star Belgrade	9	(1)
2021	Atlético Baleares	7	(0)
2021–2023	Ionikos	54	(3)
2023–2024	Kalamata	13	(0)
2024–2026	Manchester 62	38	(0)
2026	Mons Calpe	5	(0)
2026–	Glacis United	5	(0)
- * Club domestic league appearances and goals as of 15:39, 21 November 2026 (UTC)

José Alberto Cañas Ruiz-Herrera (born 27 May 1987) is a Spanish professional footballer who plays as a defensive midfielder for Gibraltar Football League club Glacis United.

He started his career with Real Betis, joining the first team in 2009 and going on to make 72 official appearances, 51 in La Liga, over three seasons, and spent 2013–14 in the Premier League with Swansea City. He signed with PAOK in July 2016, where he won the 2018–19 Super League Greece as well as three domestic cups.

== Career ==
=== Betis ===
A product of Real Betis' youth ranks, Cañas was born in Rota, Province of Cádiz. He made his first-team – and La Liga – debut on 3 May 2009, playing 83 minutes in a 0–2 home loss against Atlético Madrid. The Andalusians were ultimately relegated at the season's end.

Cañas was definitely promoted to Betis' main squad for 2010–11. He contributed 15 games during the campaign (only four starts however) as the club returned to the top flight after two years as champions, being a regular the following two seasons.

=== Swansea City ===
In April 2013, before the season in Spain was over, Cañas refused to renew his expiring contract with Betis, choosing instead to join Swansea City on a three-year deal. He made his debut on 1 August, coming on as a late substitute in a 4–0 home victory over Malmö in the first leg of the third qualifying round of the UEFA Europa League.

=== Espanyol ===
On 1 September 2014, Cañas returned to his country and its top division, joining Espanyol on a three-year contract on a free transfer. His first competitive appearance took place 13 days later, as he played the last ten minutes of a 3–1 defeat at Valencia.

During his tenure at the Estadi Cornellà-El Prat, Cañas appeared in 48 games in all competitions. 2015–16 was marred by injury problems.

=== PAOK ===
On 11 July 2016, PAOK announced the signing of Cañas until summer 2019, for an undisclosed fee. He scored his first goal as a professional on 2 April 2017, in a 2–0 home win against Athlitiki Enosi Larissa.

Cañas was part of the squad that won the Greek Cup three times in a row, totaling 16 matches and two goals in these achievements. He also helped to claim the 2018–19 edition of the Super League, helping with 14 appearances but all but being absent from the lineups in the second part of the season due to a hip injury.

=== Red Star ===
Cañas joined Red Star as a free agent in late June 2019, agreeing to a two-year contract. He made his debut under coach Vladan Milojević in a friendly on 1 July with Blau-Weiß Linz, which was won 3–1. When his new team qualified for the group stage of the UEFA Champions League, he was among the players who celebrated riding around Belgrade in an armored vehicle.

=== Later career ===
In March 2021, Cañas returned to his country and signed a short-term deal with Atlético Baleares in the Segunda División B. He left at the end of the season, even though the club tried hard to convince him to renew his link.

In August 2021, the 34-year-old Cañas agreed to a one-year contract with Ionikos in a return to the Greek top tier. Two years later, he remained in the country by joining Super League 2 side Kalamata.

Cañas moved to the Gibraltar Football League on 30 August 2024, signing for Manchester 62.

== Personal life ==
Cañas' uncle, Juan José, was also a footballer and a midfielder. He too spent most of his professional career with Betis.

== Career statistics ==
As of match played 15 May 2022

Appearances and goals by club, season and competition
Club	Season	League			Cup		Other		Total	
Club	Season	Division	Apps	Goals	Apps	Goals	Apps	Goals	Apps	Goals
Betis	2008–09	La Liga	2	0	0	0	—		2	0
Betis	2010–11	Segunda División	15	0	2	0	—		17	0
Betis	2011–12	La Liga	22	0	2	0	—		24	0
Betis	2012–13	La Liga	27	0	2	0	—		29	0
Betis	Total		66	0	4	0	—		70	0
Swansea City	2013–14	Premier League	23	0	3	0	9 (Note: Appearances in UEFA Europa League)	0	35	0
Espanyol	2014–15	La Liga	29	0	5	0	—		34	0
Espanyol	2015–16	La Liga	13	0	1	0	—		14	0
Espanyol	Total		42	0	6	0	—		48	0
PAOK	2016–17	Super League Greece	27	1	7	0	8	0	42	1
PAOK	2017–18	Super League Greece	15	0	5	1	2	0	22	1
PAOK	2018–19	Super League Greece	14	0	4	1	9 (Note: Appearances in UEFA Champions League)	1	27	2
PAOK	Total		56	1	16	2	19	1	91	4
Red Star	2019–20	Serbian SuperLiga	9	1	1	0	11	0	21	1
Atlético Baleares	2020–21	Segunda División B	7	0	0	0	0	0	7	0
Ionikos	2021–22	Super League Greece	27	2	1	0	0	0	28	2
Career total			230	4	31	2	39	1	300	7

== Honours ==
PAOK

- Super League Greece: 2018–19
- Greek Football Cup: 2016–17, 2017–18, 2018–19

Red Star

- Serbian SuperLiga: 2019–20
