= Vasilios Papadopoulos =

Greek footballer (born 1995)

Personal information
- Date of birth: 28 January 1995 (age 31)
- Place of birth: Kavala, Greece
- Height: 1.78 m (5 ft 10 in)
- Position: Striker

Team information
- Current team: Kavala
- Number: 33

Youth career
- 2007–2009: PAOK

Senior career*
Years	Team	Apps	(Gls)
2012–2017	PAOK	1	(0)
2014–2015	→ Apollon Kalamarias (loan)	17	(2)
2015–2016	→ Enosis Neon Paralimni (loan)	20	(6)
2016–2017	→ Karmiotissa (loan)	6	(1)
2017	→ Trikala (loan)	1	(0)
2017–2018	Iraklis	27	(10)
2019	Iraklis	1	(0)
2019–2020	Kavala	22	(3)
2020–2021	Ialysos	18	(4)
2021–2022	Doxa Drama		
2022	Pierikos	22	(8)
2022–2023	Almopos Aridea	25	(4)
2023–	Kavala	43	(7)

International career
2011	Greece U17	4	(2)
- * Club domestic league appearances and goals as of 20 April 2026

Vasilios Papadopoulos (Greek: Βασίλειος Παπαδόπουλος; born 28 January 1995) is a Greek professional footballer who plays as a striker for Super League 2 club Kavala.

== Career ==
On 9 February 2013, Papadopoulos made his Super League debut for PAOK against OFI.
