= Giannis Mystakidis =

Greek footballer (born 1994)

Personal information
- Full name: Ioannis Mystakidis
- Date of birth: 7 December 1994 (age 31)
- Place of birth: Thessaloniki, Greece
- Height: 1.84 m (6 ft 0 in)
- Position: Winger

Youth career
- 2009–2011: 1899 Hoffenheim
- 2011–2012: Waldhof Mannheim
- 2012–2014: SC Freiburg

Senior career*
Years	Team	Apps	(Gls)
2014–2020	PAOK	35	(7)
2014–2015	→ Pierikos (loan)	25	(4)
2018	→ Panathinaikos (loan)	8	(0)
2018–2019	→ PAS Giannina (loan)	10	(1)
2019	→ Górnik Zabrze (loan)	9	(0)
2019	→ Volos (loan)	8	(0)
2020–2021	De Graafschap	15	(0)
2021	Xanthi	11	(0)
2021–2022	Veria	4	(0)
2022–2023	Panserraikos	2	(0)
2024	Kampaniakos	13	(0)
Total		140	(12)

International career
2015–2016	Greece U21	5	(0)
- * Club domestic league appearances and goals

Giannis Mystakidis (Greek: Γιάννης Μυστακίδης; born 7 December 1994) is a Greek former professional footballer who played as a winger.

== Career ==
Born in Thessaloniki, Mystakidis started his career in Germany playing for Regionalliga Südwest club SC Freiburg II. He first played professionally in the 2014–15 season with Pierikos. He can cover all three positions behind the forward, is not predictable in his playing and has good finishes in both short and long distance.

Mystakidis scored his first goal for PAOK in an unofficial match against Dnipro. On 16 July 2015, he made his debut with PAOK in an away loss game against Lokomotiva Zagreb for the second qualifying round of the UEFA Europa League.

He scored his first goal in 2015–16 season in a 3–1 away win against AEL Kalloni. On 25 August 2016, PAOK extended the contract of the young striker till the summer 2020.

On 29 January 2017, he scored the only goal in a 1–0 Super League Greece away win against Panetolikos. Two days later, he scored another goal in a 2–0 away win against AEL and a week after he scored 2–1 Greek Football Cup away win against Xanthi.

The 2016–17 season was an establishment year for the young striker, as he had gradually managed to gain the trust of Vladimir Ivić. On 2 April, in the 80th minute of the match against AEL for the 26th day of the Super League, the 22-year-old ace was forced to request an immediate change after an attempt to avert a throw-out. A day later, Mystakidis had a surgery, faced a cruciate ligament rupture that probably kept him out of the team for six months. On 19 December 2017, he made his return to competitive football, coming on in the 82nd minute during the club's 5–1 Greek Cup away win against Trikala. His first appearance came 260 days after the knee injury. He almost scored too, as a firm header was turned aside by the Trikala goalkeeper. Mystakidis received a cut to the right eyebrow after a collision with an opposing player.

On 31 January 2018, he signed a six-month contract with rivals Panathinaikos on loan from PAOK, until the end of the 2017–18 season without a purchase option.

On 20 August 2018, he signed a long season contract with PAS Giannina on loan from PAOK, until the end of the 2018–19 season without a purchase option. The loan contract was terminated on 4 January 2019, six months before it was due to expire. On 2 February 2019, he joined Polish club Górnik Zabrze on a six months loan from PAOK.

On 30 June 2019, it was confirmed that Mystakidis would spend the 2019–20 season on loan at Volos.

On 14 January 2020, he signed a contract with Eerste Divisie club De Graafschap until July 2020.

== Career statistics ==
As of match played on 7 November 2020

Appearances and goals by club, season and competition
Club	Season	League			National cup		League cup		Continental		Total	
Club	Season	Division	Apps	Goals	Apps	Goals	Apps	Goals	Apps	Goals	Apps	Goals
PAOK	2014–15	Super League Greece	0	0	0	0	—		0	0	0	0
PAOK	2015–16	Super League Greece	18	4	4	1	—		8	0	30	5
PAOK	2016–17	Super League Greece	17	3	7	3	—		7	0	31	6
PAOK	2017–18	Super League Greece	0	0	2	0	—		0	0	2	0
PAOK	Total		35	7	13	4	0	0	15	0	63	11
Pierikos (loan)	2014–15	Football League	25	4	2	0	—		—		27	4
Panathinaikos (loan)	2017–18	Super League Greece	6	0	0	0	—		—		6	0
PAS Giannina (loan)	2018–19	Super League Greece	10	1	0	0	—		—		10	1
Górnik Zabrze (loan)	2018–19	Ekstraklasa	9	0	0	0	—		—		9	0
Volos (loan)	2019–20	Super League Greece	8	0	1	0	—		—		9	0
De Graafschap	2019–20	Eerste Divisie	6	0	0	0	—		—		6	0
De Graafschap	2020–21	Eerste Divisie	9	0	0	0	—		—		9	0
Career total			107	12	16	4	0	0	15	0	141	16

== Honours ==
PAOK

- Greek Cup: 2016–17, 2017–18
