= Panagiotis Deligiannidis =

Greek professional footballer

Personal information
- Date of birth: 29 August 1996 (age 30)
- Place of birth: Thessaloniki, Greece
- Height: 1.80 m (5 ft 11 in)
- Positions: Right-back; wing-back

Team information
- Current team: Asteras Tripolis
- Number: 64

Youth career
- –2012: Mpempides 2000
- 2012–2014: PAOK

Senior career*
Years	Team	Apps	(Gls)
2014–2019	PAOK	3	(0)
2016	→ Zemplín Michalovce (loan)	1	(0)
2018–2019	→ OFI (loan)	9	(2)
2019–2020	OFI	6	(1)
2020–2021	Sepsi OSK	15	(0)
2021–2022	Xanthi	18	(1)
2022–2025	Panserraikos	74	(5)
2025–2026	AEL	12	(0)
2026–	Asteras Tripolis	16	(0)

International career^{‡}
2012	Greece U17	6	(1)
2013	Greece U18	5	(0)
2013–2015	Greece U19	26	(3)
2017–2018	Greece U21	8	(0)
- * Club domestic league appearances and goals as of 14 June 2026 ‡ National team caps and goals as of 10 September 2018

Panagiotis Deligiannidis (Greek: Παναγιώτης Δεληγιαννίδης, born 29 August 1996) is a Greek professional footballer who plays as a defender for Super League club Asteras Tripolis.

== Career ==
On 23 February 2016, Deligiannidis joined Slovak club Zemplín Michalovce on a six-months loan deal, until the end of the 2015–16 season.

== Career statistics ==
=== Club ===
As of match played 01:10, 12 March 2021 (UTC).

Appearances and goals by club, season and competition
Club	Season	League			National Cup (Note: Includes Greek Cup)		League Cup		Continental (Note: Includes UEFA Europa League)		Other		Total	
Club	Season	Division	Apps	Goals	Apps	Goals	Apps	Goals	Apps	Goals	Apps	Goals	Apps	Goals
PAOK	2014–15	Super League Greece	1	0	0	0	—		—		—		1	0
PAOK	2015–16	Super League Greece	0	0	1	0	—		1	0	—		2	0
PAOK	2016–17	Super League Greece	2	0	2	1	—		—		—		4	1
PAOK	2017–18	Super League Greece	0	0	5	0	—		0	0	—		5	0
PAOK	Total		3	0	8	1	—		1	0	—		12	1
Zemplín Michalovce (loan)	2015–16	Slovak Super Liga	1	0	0	0	—		—		—		1	0
OFI (loan)	2018–19	Super League Greece	9	2	2	0	—		—		0	0	11	2
OFI	2019–20	Super League Greece	6	1	0	0	—		—		—		6	1
OFI	Total		15	3	2	0	—		—		0	0	17	3
Sepsi OSK	2020–21	Liga I	15	0	0	0	—		—		—		15	0
Career total			34	3	10	1	—		1	0	—		45	4

== Honours ==
PAOK

- Greek Cup: 2016–17, 2017–18
