= 2018–19 PAOK FC season =

PAOK
2018–19 season
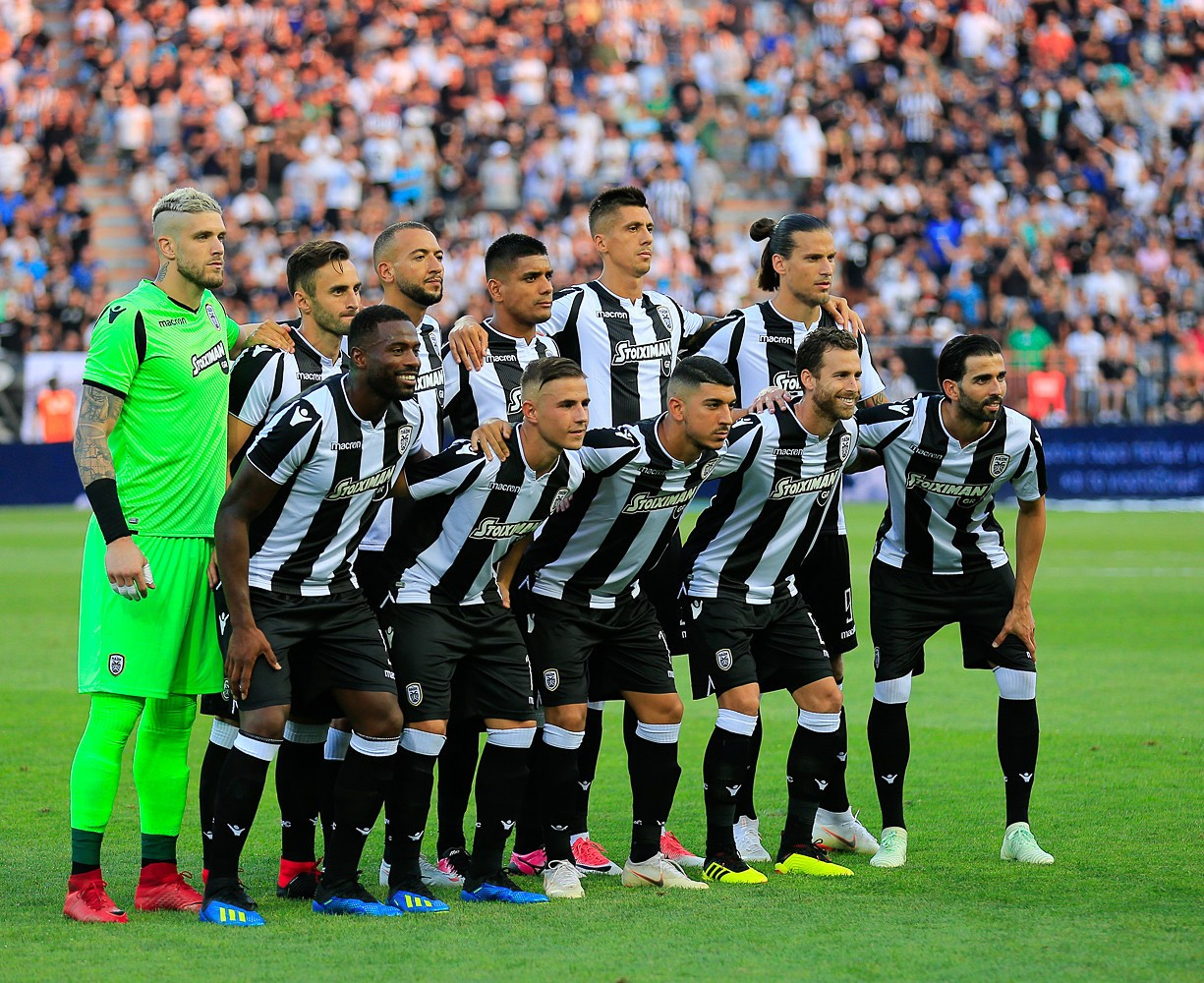
- President: Ivan Savvidis
- Manager: Răzvan Lucescu
- Stadium: Toumba Stadium
- Super League: 1st
- Greek Cup: Winners
- UEFA Champions League: Play-off round
- UEFA Europa League: Group stage
- Top goalscorer: League: Aleksandar Prijović (9); All: Aleksandar Prijović (18)
- Highest home attendance: 26,725 vs Benfica (29 August 2018)
- Lowest home attendance: 10,837 vs PAS Giannina (30 January 2019)
- Average home league attendance: 20,606
Home colours	Away colours	Third colours

The 2018–19 season was PAOK Football Club's 93rd in existence and the club's 60th consecutive season in the top flight of Greek football. The team won the Super League unbeaten, defended their Greek Football Cup title won in 2018, and also competed in the UEFA Champions League and UEFA Europa League.

== Coaching staff ==
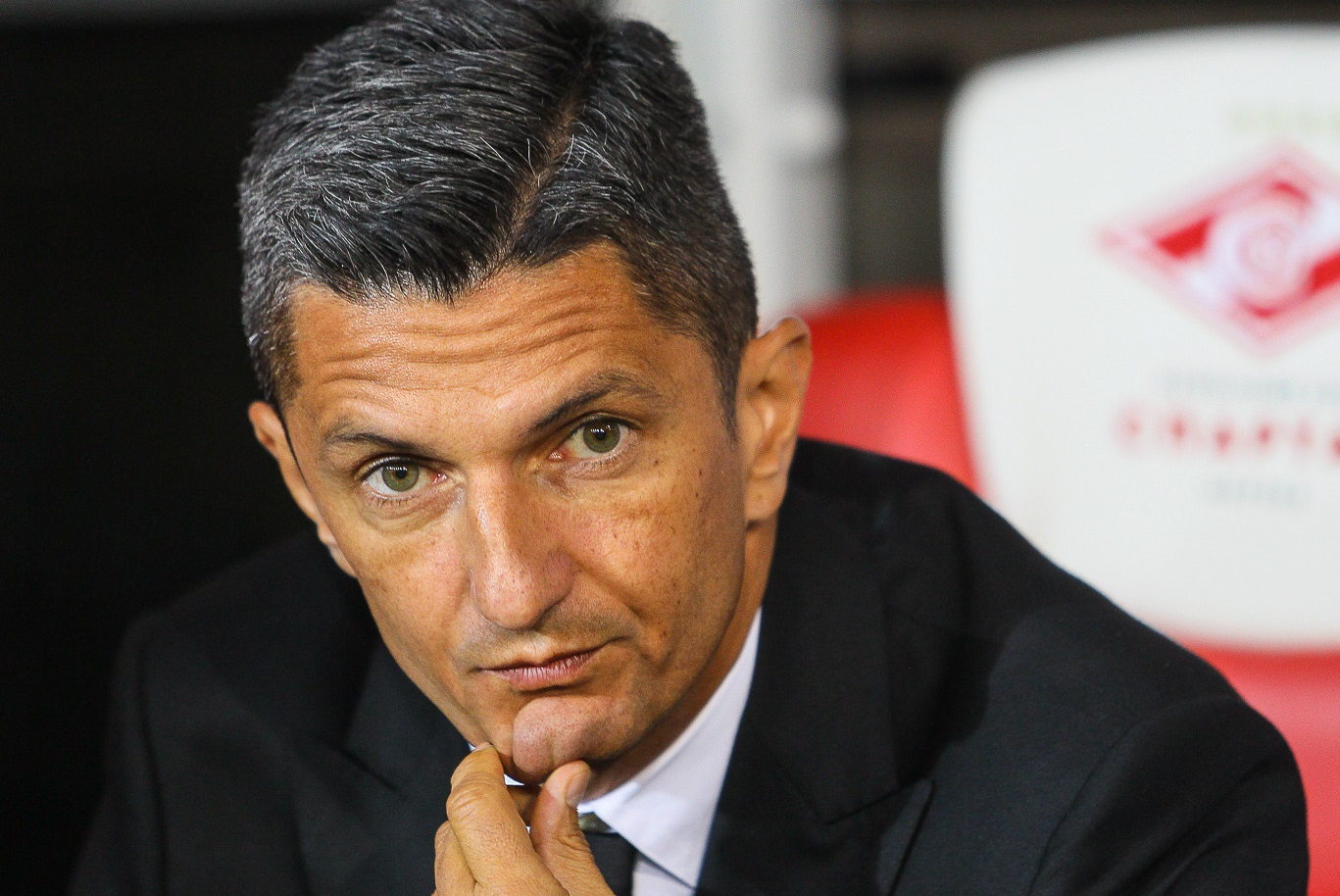
This was Răzvan Lucescu's second season with PAOK.

Position	Staff
Head coach	(Romania) Răzvan Lucescu
Assistant manager	(Italy) Diego Longo
Assistant manager	(Italy) Cristiano Bacci
Team Manager	(Greece) Pantelis Konstantinidis
Goalkeeping coach	(Greece) Giorgos Skiatitis
Head Gymnast Rehabilitation	(Greece) Georgios Tsonakas
Gymnast Rehabilitation	(Greece) Vasilios Kanaras
Fitness Coach	(Italy) Matteo Spatafora
Data Analyst (Vis-Track)	(Greece) Kyriakos Tsitsiridis
Opponent Analysis	(Greece) Ioannis Thomaidis
Head of Medical Services	(Greece) Emmanouil Papakostas
Club's Doctor	(Greece) Kostas Tziantzis
Exercise Physiology	(Greece) Giorgos Ziogas
Nutritionist	(Greece) Ioanna Paspala
Physiotherapist	(Greece) Petros Nikolakoudis
Physiotherapist	(Greece) Nikolaos Tsirelas
Physiotherapist	(Greece) Athanasios Kapoulas
Physiotherapist	(Greece) Nikolaos Gagalis
Physiotherapist	(Greece) Nikolaos Mouratidis
Academy's Technical Director	(Spain) Daniel Bigas Alsina

Last updated: 18 August 2017
Source: paokfc.gr

=== Other information ===
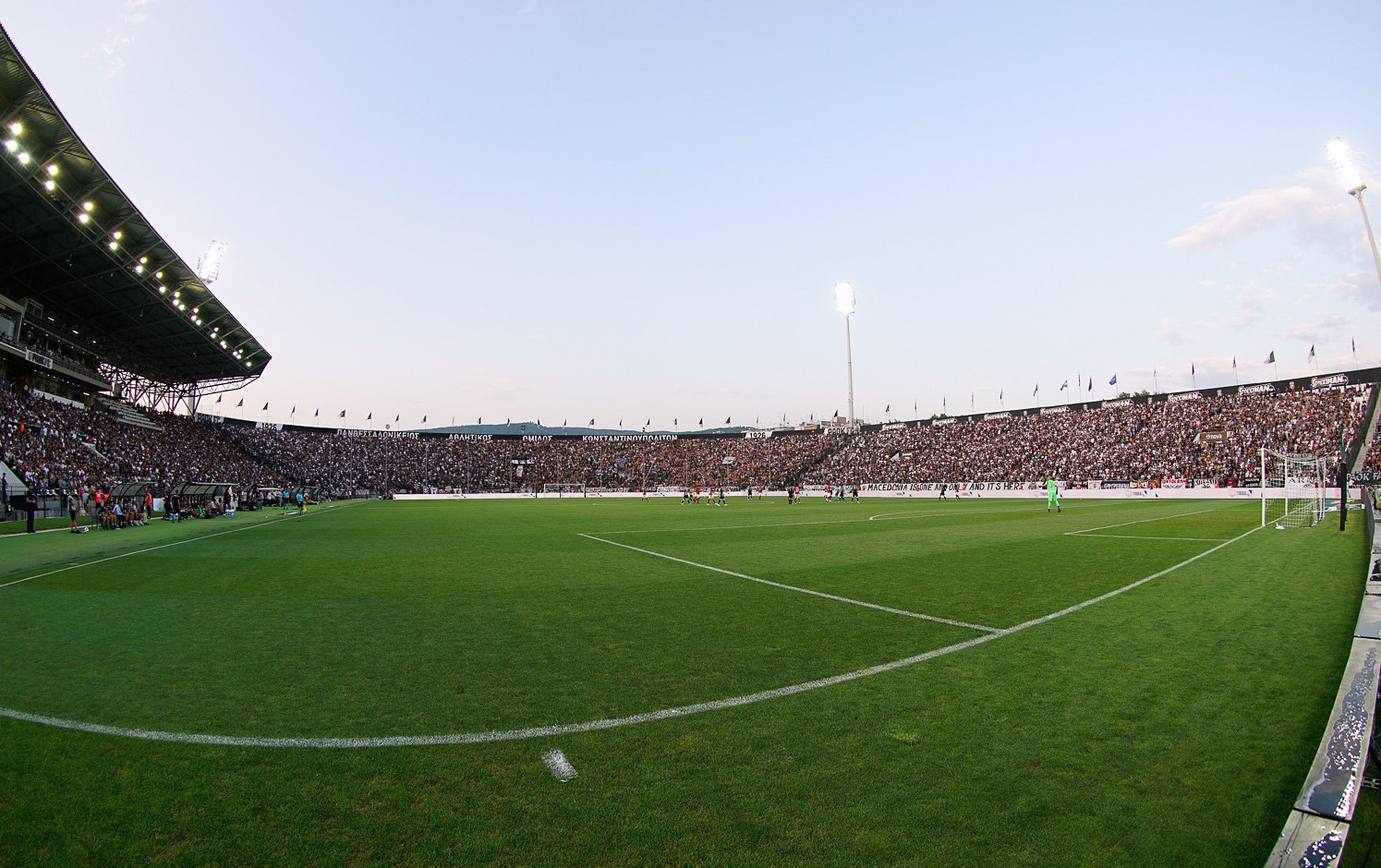
Toumba Stadium

Owner	Dimera Group Limited
Chairman	(Russia) (Greece) Ivan Savvidis
Vice President & CEO	(Greece) Chrisostomos Gagatsis
Technical Director	(Portugal) Mário Branco
Members	(Russia) (Greece) Giorgos Savvidis (Russia) Maria Goncharova (Russia) Artur Davidyan (Greece) Dimokratis Papadopoulos (Greece) Ilias Gerontidis
Consultant of Football	(Greece) Giorgos Koudas
Ground (capacity and dimensions)	Toumba Stadium (29,000 / 106×71 metres)
Training Ground	PAOK Sport Center

Source: paokfc.gr

== Players ==
=== Squad information ===
N	Pos.	Nat.	Name	Age	EU	Since	App	Goals	Ends	Transfer fee	Notes
1	GK	(Argentina)	Rodrigo Rey	35	EU	2017	18	0	2021	€1.5M	Second nationality: Italy
3	RWB	(Brazil)	Léo Matos	40	Non-EU	2016	85	15	2021		
5	CB	(Cape Verde)	Fernando Varela	38	EU	2016	75	2	2019	€1.4M	Second nationality: Portugal
6	DF	(Romania)	Alin Toșca	34	EU	2018	0	0	2019		
7	AM	(Morocco)	Omar El Kaddouri	36	EU	2017	21	2	2021	€1.3M	Second nationality: Belgium
8	MF	(Brazil)	Maurício	37	Non-EU	2017	27	4	2020		
9	CF	(Serbia)	Aleksandar Prijović	36	EU	2017	60	37	2022	€1.9M	
10	AM	(Greece)	Dimitrios Pelkas (3rd captain)	32	EU	2007	127	29	2021	PAOK U20	
11	FW	(Greece)	Nikos Karelis	34	EU	2018	0	0	2019		
13	CB	(Greece)	Stelios Malezas (Vice-captain)	41	EU	2005/2015	237	5	2019	€0.10M	
15	CB	(Spain)	José Ángel Crespo	39	EU	2016	82	3	2019		
18	RW	(Greece)	Dimitrios Limnios	28	EU	2017	31	1	2021	€0.80M	
19	MF	(Sweden)	Pontus Wernbloom	40	EU	2018	0	0	2021		
20	DF	(Portugal)	Vieirinha (captain)	40	EU	2008/2017	158	30	2020	€1M	
21	FW	(Suriname)	Diego Biseswar	38	EU	2016	76	10	2022		
28	CM	(Ukraine)	Yevhen Shakhov	35	Non-EU	2016	77	16	2019		
31	GK	(Greece)	Alexandros Paschalakis	37	EU	2017	24	0	2020		
34	DF	(Ukraine)	Yevhen Khacheridi	39	EU	2018	0	0	2021		
47	FW	(England)	Chuba Akpom	31	EU	2018	0	0	2021	€1.0M	
60	GK	(Greece)	Symeon Papadopoulos	26	EU	2017	0	0	2020		
70	RB	(Greece)	Stelios Kitsiou	33	EU	2007	148	5	2020	PAOK U20	
71	GK	(Greece)	Panagiotis Glykos	40	EU	2007	165	0	2019		
74	FW	(Egypt)	Amr Warda	33	Non-EU	2017	14	2	2020	€0.35M	
87	DM	(Spain)	José Cañas	39	EU	2016	64	2	2019		
98	FW	(Brazil)	Léo Jabá	28	Non-EU	2018	0	0	2023	€2.3M	
99	GK	(Greece)	Marios Siampanis	27	EU	2015	3	0	2019	PAOK U20	

- Last updated: Start of season
- Source: paokfc.gr, 2017/18 numbers, Players in / out, Wikipedia players' articles, and paokfc.gr (for appearances and goals)

=== Players in ===
No.	Pos.	Nat.	Name	Age	EU	Moving from	Type	Transfer window	Ends	Transfer fee	Source
23	DF	(Greece)	Dimitris Giannoulis	30	EU	(Greece) Atromitos	Loan Return	Winter	2022	Free	
11	FW	(Brazil)	Pedro Henrique Konzen	36	Non-EU	(Kazakhstan) Astana	Loan Return	Winter	2020	Free	
26	MF	(Portugal)	Sérgio Oliveira	34	EU	(Portugal) Porto FC	Loan	Winter	2019	Free	
27	MF	(Croatia)	Josip Mišic	32	EU	(Portugal) Sporting CP	Loan	Winter	2020	Free	
4	DF	(Iceland)	Sverrir Ingi Ingason	33	EU	(Russia) FK Rostov	Transfer	Winter	2022	€4M	
9	FW	(Poland)	Karol Świderski	29	EU	(Poland) Jagiellonia Białystok	Transfer	Winter	2022	€2M	
98	FW	(Brazil)	Léo Jabá	28	Non-EU	(Russia) Akhmat Grozny	Transfer	Summer	2023	€2.3M	
47	FW	(England)	Chuba Akpom	31	EU	(England) Arsenal	Transfer	Summer	2021	€1M	
6	DF	(Romania)	Alin Toșca	34	EU	(Spain) Real Betis	Loan	Summer	2019	Free	
11	FW	(Greece)	Nikos Karelis	34	EU	(Belgium) Genk	Loan	Summer	2019	Free	
19	MF	(Sweden)	Pontus Wernbloom	40	EU	(Russia) CSKA Moscow	Free Transfer	Summer	2021	Free	
34	DF	(Ukraine)	Yevhen Khacheridi	39	EU	(Ukraine) Dynamo Kyiv	Free Transfer	Summer	2021	Free	
74	FW	(Egypt)	Amr Warda	33	Non-EU	(Greece) Atromitos	Loan Return	Summer		Free	
11	FW	(Brazil)	Pedro Henrique Konzen	36	Non-EU	(Azerbaijan) Qarabağ	Loan Return	Summer		Free	
11	FW	(Greece)	Lazaros Lamprou	28	EU	(Greece) Panionios	Loan Return	Summer		Free	
70	RB	(Greece)	Stelios Kitsiou	33	EU	(Belgium) Sint-Truidense	Loan Return	Summer		Free	-
8	MF	(Greece)	Charis Charisis	31	EU	(Belgium) Sint-Truidense	Loan Return	Summer		Free	-
30	GK	(Greece)	Nikos Melissas	33	EU	(Greece) PAS Lamia	Loan Return	Summer		Free	
5	DF	(Greece)	Dimitris Chatziisaias	34	EU	(Greece) Atromitos	Loan Return	Summer		Free	
26	DM	(Albania)	Ergys Kaçe	33	EU	(Greece) Panathinaikos	Loan Return	Summer		Free	
27	FW	(Greece)	Giannis Mystakidis	31	EU	(Greece) Panathinaikos	Loan Return	Summer		Free	
4	LB	(Croatia)	Marin Leovac	38	EU	(Croatia) Rijeka	Loan Return	Summer		Free	
19	FW	(Brazil)	Jairo	34	Non-EU	(Moldova) Sheriff Tiraspol	Loan Return	Summer		Free	

Total spending: ▼€9.3M

=== Players out ===
No.	Pos.	Nat.	Name	Age	EU	Moving to	Type	Transfer window	Transfer fee	Source
9	CF	(Serbia)	Aleksandar Prijović	36	EU	(Saudi Arabia) Al-Ittihad	Transfer	Winter	€10M	
74	FW	(Egypt)	Amr Warda	33	Non-EU	(Greece) Atromitos	Loan	Winter	Free	
70	RB	(Greece)	Stelios Kitsiou	33	EU	(Turkey) Ankaragucu	Loan	Winter	Free	
10	FW	(Angola)	Djalma Campos	39	EU	(Turkey) Alanyaspor	Transfer	Summer	€600K	
4	LB	(Croatia)	Marin Leovac	38	EU	(Croatia) GNK Dinamo Zagreb	Transfer	Summer	€300K	
19	FW	(Brazil)	Jairo	34	Non-EU	(Croatia) Hajduk Split	Free Transfer	Summer	Free	
11	FW	(Brazil)	Pedro Henrique Konzen	36	Non-EU	(Kazakhstan) Astana	Loan	Summer	Free	
11	FW	(Greece)	Lazaros Lamprou	28	EU	(Netherlands) Fortuna Sittard	Loan	Summer	Free	
90	DF	(Greece)	Dimitris Giannoulis	30	EU	(Greece) Atromitos	Loan	Summer	Free	
20	FW	(Greece)	Efthymis Koulouris	30	EU	(Greece) Atromitos	Loan	Summer	Free	
5	DF	(Greece)	Dimitris Chatziisaias	34	EU	(Greece) Atromitos	Loan	Summer	Free	
6	MF	(Greece)	Charis Charisis	31	EU	(Belgium) Kortrijk	Loan	Summer	Free	
27	FW	(Greece)	Giannis Mystakidis	31	EU	(Greece) PAS Giannina	Loan	Summer	Free	
30	GK	(Greece)	Nikos Melissas	33	EU	(Greece) PAS Lamia	Loan	Summer	Free	
75	MF	(France)	Thibault Moulin	36	EU	(Turkey) Ankaragucu	Loan	Summer	Free	
16	DF	(Bosnia and Herzegovina)	Marko Mihojevic	30	EU	(Greece) OFI	Loan	Summer	Free	
26	LB	(Greece)	Panagiotis Deligiannidis	30	EU	(Greece) OFI	Loan	Summer	Free	
26	CB	(Greece)	Achilleas Poungouras	30	EU	(Greece) Panathinaikos	Transfer	Summer	Free	
26	DM	(Albania)	Ergys Kaçe	33	EU	(Greece) Panathinaikos	Loan	Summer	Free	

▲ Total Income: €10.9M
Net income: ▲€1.6M

== Pre-season ==
Win Draw Loss

26 June 2018 Friendly	PAOK	5–0	U23 KAA Gent	Horst, Netherlands
19:00 EET UTC+03:00	Maurício 44'; Lamprou 57'; Pelkas 72'; Mystakidis 77'; Limnios 82'			Stadium: Sporting Swolgen Tienray

29 June 2018 Friendly	PAOK	2–2	RSC Anderlecht	Horst, Netherlands
19:00 EET UTC+03:00	El Kaddouri 47', 53'		Bornauw 43'; Gerkens 45'	Stadium: Sporting Swolgen Tienray

2 July 2018 Friendly	PAOK	1–2	Nordsjælland	Horst, Netherlands
18:00 EET UTC+03:00	Koulouris 75'		Olsen 6'; Donyoh 31'	Stadium: Sporting Swolgen Tienray

9 July 2018 Friendly	FCSB	1–2	PAOK	Apeldoorn, Netherlands
20:00 EET UTC+03:00	Man 47'		Vieirinha 5'; El Kaddouri 10'

12 July 2018 Friendly	PAOK	1–1	Gent	Arnhem, Netherlands
19:00 EET UTC+03:00	Jabá 75'		Plastun 90'	Stadium: Marasingel, Arnhem

15 July 2018 Friendly	Royal Antwerp	3–1	PAOK	Halderberge, Netherlands
13:30 EET UTC+03:00	Opare 16'; Bolingi 44'; Owusu 59'		Lamprou 31'	Stadium: vv Victoria ‘03

16 July 2018 Friendly	PAOK	2–1	De Graafschap	Silvolde, Netherlands
15:30 EET UTC+03:00	Matos 35'; Prijović 44'		Thomassen 33'	Stadium: Sportpark De Munsterman

== Competitions ==
=== Overview ===
Competition	First match	Last match	Starting round	Final position	Record							
Competition	First match	Last match	Starting round	Final position	Pld	W	D	L	GF	GA	GD	Win %
Super League Greece	25 August 2018	5 May 2019	Matchday 1	Winners	30	26	4	0	66	14	+52	86.67
Greek Cup	26 September 2018	11 May 2019	Group stage	Winners	10	6	2	2	23	8	+15	60.00
UEFA Champion's League	24 July 2018	29 August 2018	Second qualifying round	Play-off round	6	3	2	1	10	8	+2	50.00
UEFA Europa League	20 September 2018	13 December 2018	Group stage	Group stage	6	1	0	5	5	12	−7	16.67
Total					52	36	8	8	104	42	+62	69.23

Last updated: 11 May 2019.
Source: Competitions

=== Managerial statistics ===
Head coach	From	To	Record							
Head coach	From	To	G	W	D	L	GF	GA	GD	Win %
(Romania) Răzvan Lucescu	07.24.2018	06.28.2019	52	36	8	8	104	42	+62	69.23

=== Super League Greece ===
==== League table ====
Pos	Team	Pld	W	D	L	GF	GA	GD	Pts	Qualification or relegation
1	PAOK (Note: PAOK were deducted 2 points by court decision.) (C)	30	26	4	0	66	14	+52	80	Qualification for the Champions League third qualifying round
2	Olympiacos	30	24	3	3	71	17	+54	75	Qualification for the Champions League second qualifying round
3	AEK Athens (Note: AEK Athens were deducted 3 points by court decision.)	30	18	6	6	50	19	+31	57	Qualification for the Europa League third qualifying round
4	Atromitos	30	15	7	8	41	28	+13	52	Qualification for the Europa League second qualifying round
5	Aris	30	15	4	11	46	33	+13	49	Qualification for the Europa League second qualifying round

Source: Super League Greece
Rules for classification: 1) Points; 2) Head-to-head points; 3) Head-to-head goal difference; 4) Goal difference; 5) Goals scored; 6) Goals against 7) Play-offs (neutral ground); 8) Draw.
(Note: Criteria 7 is only used if needed to decide champion, teams for relegation or teams for UEFA competitions).
(C) Champions

==== Results summary ====
Overall								Home						Away					
Pld	W	D	L	GF	GA	GD	Pts	W	D	L	GF	GA	GD	W	D	L	GF	GA	GD
30	26	4	0	66	14	+52	82	14	1	0	37	5	+32	12	3	0	29	9	+20

Last updated: 5 May 2019.
Source: Competitive matches

==== Results by round ====
Round	1	2	3	4	5	6	7	8	9	10	11	12	13	14	15	16	17	18	19	20	21	22	23	24	25	26	27	28	29	30
Ground	H	A	A	H	A	H	A	H	A	H	H	A	H	A	H	A	H	H	A	H	A	H	A	H	A	A	H	A	H	A
Result	W	W	W	W	W	W	W	W	D	W	W	W	W	W	W	W	W	W	D	W	W	D	W	W	W	W	W	D	W	W
Position	8	4	4	2	1	1	1	1	1	1	1	1	1	1	1	1	1	1	1	1	1	1	1	1	1	1	1	1	1	1

Updated to match(es) played on 5 May 2019. Source: League matches
A = Away; H = Home; W = Win; D = Draw; L = Loss

==== Matches ====
25 August 2018 1	PAOK	1–0	Asteras Tripolis	Thessaloniki
19:15 EET, UTC+03:00	Khacheridi (yellow card) 24'; El Kaddouri (yellow card) 55'; Prijović 58' (pen.)	Report	Triantafyllopoulos (yellow card) 5'; Kotsiras (yellow card) 33'; Kyriakopoulos (yellow card) 46'; Valiente (yellow card) 73'	Stadium: Toumba Stadium; Attendance: 16,255; Referee: Aristomenis Koutsiaftis (Arta); Man of the Match: Amr Warda

2 September 2018 2	Panionios	0–1	PAOK	Nea Smyrni
19:15 EET, UTC+03:00		Report	Khacheridi (yellow card) 18'; El Kaddouri 68'; Shakhov (yellow card) 82'	Stadium: Nea Smyrni Stadium; Attendance: 3,299; Referee: Anastasios Papapetrou (Athens); Man of the Match: Omar El Kaddouri

15 September 2018 3	OFI	1–3	PAOK	Heraklion
18:15 EET, UTC+03:00	Papasterianos 21' (yellow card) 52'; Sassi (yellow card) 34'; Potouridis (yellow card) 49'; Platellas (yellow card) 81'	Report	Jabá (yellow card) 26' (goal) 53'; Biseswar 37'; Matos 45+4' (yellow card) 62'; Wernbloom (yellow card) 86'	Stadium: Theodoros Vardinogiannis Stadium; Attendance: 5,186; Referee: Aristotelis Diamantopoulos (Arcadia); Man of the Match: Diego Biseswar

23 September 2018 4	PAOK	2–0	AEK Athens	Thessaloniki
20:30 EET, UTC+03:00	Maurício (yellow card) 22'; Prijović 29', 59'; Jabá (yellow card) 78'	Report	Mantalos (yellow card) 33'	Stadium: Toumba Stadium; Attendance: 23,763; Referee: Mattias Gestranius (Finland); Man of the Match: Aleksandar Prijović

30 September 2018 5	Olympiacos	0–1	PAOK	Piraeus
20:30 EET, UTC+03:00	Koka (yellow card) 34'	Report	Vuković 49' (o.g.); Cañas (yellow card) 66'; Matos (yellow card) 90'; Paschalakis (yellow card) 90+8'	Stadium: Karaiskakis Stadium; Attendance: 30,532; Referee: San Fedayi (Switzerland); Man of the Match: Alexandros Paschalakis

7 October 2018 6	PAOK	2–0	Apollon Smyrnis	Thessaloniki
18:15 EET, UTC+03:00	Maurício 16' (yellow card) 24'; Biseswar (yellow card) 78'; Garrós 90' (o.g.); Vieirinha (yellow card) 90+1'	Report	Kontoes (yellow card) 36'; Bedinelli (yellow card) 43'; Gino (yellow card) 87'	Stadium: Toumba Stadium; Attendance: 15,918; Referee: Georgios Tasis (Epirus); Man of the Match: Maurício

21 October 2018 7	Aris	1–2	PAOK	Thessaloniki
19:00 EET, UTC+03:00	García 2'; Valerianos (yellow card) 20'; Basha (yellow card) 37'; Younés (penalty missed) 66'; Siopis (yellow card) 67'	Report	Prijović (yellow card) 19' (goal) 36' (pen.), 84'; Cañas (yellow card) 37'; Matos (yellow card) 57'; Warda (yellow card) 57'; Wernbloom (yellow card) 70'; Vieirinha (yellow card) 79'; Biseswar (yellow card) 90+3'	Stadium: Kleanthis Vikelidis Stadium; Attendance: 16,434; Referee: Daniele Doveri (Italy); Man of the Match: Alexandros Paschalakis

29 October 2018 8	PAOK	2–0	Panathinaikos	Thessaloniki
21:30 EET, UTC+02:00	Prijović 51'; Limnios 76'	Report	Kaçe (yellow card) 79'; Kourbelis (yellow card) 87'	Stadium: Toumba Stadium; Attendance: 20,389; Referee: Jens Maae (Denmark); Man of the Match: Léo Jabá

3 November 2018 9	Atromitos	1–1	PAOK	Peristeri
16:00 EET, UTC+02:00	Sakic (yellow card) 38'; Ugrai (yellow card) 59' (goal) 73'	Report	Crespo 40'; Matos (yellow card) 62'; Wernbloom (yellow card) 69'	Stadium: Peristeri Stadium; Attendance: 1,635; Referee: Athanasios Tzilos (Larissa); Man of the Match: Fernando Varela

11 November 2018 10	PAOK	2–1	Panetolikos	Thessaloniki
17:15 EET, UTC+02:00	Shakhov (yellow card) 51'; Marinakis 63' (o.g.); Akpom 66'; Kitsiou (yellow card) 83'; Pelkas (yellow card) 90'	Report	Mazurek (yellow card) 52'; Marinakis (yellow card) 56'; Kamara 71'	Stadium: Toumba Stadium; Attendance: 15,168; Referee: Alexandros Tsamouris (Piraeus); Man of the Match: Chuba Akpom

24 November 2018 11	PAOK	2–0	Xanthi	Thessaloniki
19:30 EET, UTC+02:00	Kitsiou (yellow card) 15'; Prijović 47'; Maurício 65'	Report	Baxevanidis (yellow card) 63'	Stadium: Toumba Stadium; Attendance: 14,747; Referee: Athanasios Sezos (Kilkis); Man of the Match: Dimitrios Limnios

3 December 2018 12	Lamia	0–1	PAOK	Lamia
19:00 EET, UTC+02:00	Barrales (yellow card) 75'	Report	Cañas (yellow card) 31' (yellow-red card) 63'; Varela (yellow card) 38' (goal) 54'	Stadium: Lamia Municipal Stadium; Attendance: 1,648; Referee: Alexandros Tsamouris (Piraeus); Man of the Match: Alexandros Paschalakis

9 December 2018 13	PAOK	2–1	AEL	Thessaloniki
19:30 EET, UTC+02:00	Prijović 45+3' (pen.); Akpom 69'	Report	Karanikas (yellow card) 5' (yellow-red card) 45+1'; Acosta (yellow card) 26'; Nunić 36'	Stadium: Toumba Stadium; Attendance: 15,219; Referee: Konstantinos Kotsanis (Drama); Man of the Match: Chuba Akpom

17 December 2018 14	Levadiakos	1–2	PAOK	Livadeia
19:30 EET, UTC+02:00	Liagas (yellow card) 22'; Panteliadis (yellow card) 38'; Zisopoulos 75'; Tsabouris (yellow card) 84'	Report	Matos (yellow card) 28'; Prijović 41'; Biseswar 46'	Stadium: Levadia Municipal Stadium; Attendance: 1,871; Referee: Stefanos Koubarakis (Thrace); Man of the Match: Diego Biseswar

13 January 2019 16	Asteras Tripolis	0–3	PAOK	Tripoli
19:30 EET, UTC+02:00	Triantafyllopoulos (yellow card) 24'; Fernández (yellow card) 72'; Kyriakopoulos (yellow card) 74'; Valiente (yellow card) 83'; Munafo (yellow card) 87'	Report	Shakhov (yellow card) 14'; Biseswar (yellow card) 44'; Vieirinha 65' (yellow card) 89'; Maurício 69'; Matos (yellow card) 74' (yellow-red card) 79'; Triantafyllopoulos 90+1' (o.g.)	Stadium: Theodoros Kolokotronis Stadium; Attendance: 2,115; Referee: Manolis Skoulas (Thessaly); Man of the Match: Alexandros Paschalakis

19 January 2019 17	PAOK	3–0	Panionios	Thessaloniki
19:30 EET, UTC+02:00	Biseswar 11'; Maurício (yellow card) 16'; Limnios (yellow card) 33'; Vieirinha 45+2'; Shakhov (yellow card) 48' (goal) 69'; El Kaddouri (yellow card) 52'	Report	Makrillos (yellow card) 33' (yellow-red card) 41'; Saramantas (yellow card) 39'; Durmishaj (yellow card) 48'	Stadium: Toumba Stadium; Attendance: 15,961; Referee: Anastasios Sidiropoulos (Dodecanese); Man of the Match: Diego Biseswar

27 January 2019 18	PAOK	4–0	OFI	Thessaloniki
17:15 EET, UTC+02:00	Vieirinha (yellow card) 22'; Matos 24'; Akpom 35', 80'; Jabá 65'; Varela (yellow card) 84'	Report	Mellado (yellow card) 41'; Nastos (yellow card) 43'; Giakoumakis (yellow card) 84'; Dinas (yellow card) 87'	Stadium: Toumba Stadium; Attendance: 15,619; Referee: Evangelos Gratsanis (Trikala); Man of the Match: Chuba Akpom

30 January 2019 15	PAOK	2–1	PAS Giannina	Thessaloniki
17:15 EET, UTC+02:00	Pelkas 38' (pen.) (yellow card) 45'; Akpom (penalty missed) 76'; Świderski 87'; Giannoulis (yellow card) 90'	Report	Evangelou (yellow card) 17'; Skondras (yellow card) 29'; Križman (yellow card) 41'; Manos 52'; Lila (yellow card) 55'; Siontis (yellow card) 77'	Stadium: Toumba Stadium; Attendance: 10,837; Referee: Fotis Fotiadis (Kastoria); Man of the Match: Karol Świderski
Note: Match was initially scheduled on Sunday, 23 December 2018, but Matchday 15 of Greek Super League was postponed because of a strike declared by Greek referees after the incident with referee Athanasios Tzilos (attacked and beaten up by 4 assailants outside his home in Larissa on 19 December).

3 February 2019 19	AEK Athens	1–1	PAOK	Marousi
19:30 EET, UTC+02:00	Bakakis (yellow card) 22'; Krstičić (yellow card) 46'; Ponce 74'; Klonaridis (yellow card) 89'; Boyé (yellow card) 90+3'	Report	Maurício 10'; Shakhov (yellow card) 18'; Jabá (yellow card) 22' (yellow-red card) 32'; Vieirinha (yellow card) 33'; Paschalakis (yellow card) 40'	Stadium: Olympic Stadium; Attendance: 24,291; Referee: Michael Tykgaard (Denmark); Man of the Match: José Ángel Crespo

10 February 2019 20	PAOK	3–1	Olympiacos	Thessaloniki
19:30 EET, UTC+02:00	Vieirinha 3'; Biseswar 19'; Shakhov (yellow card) 42'; El Kaddouri (yellow card) 77'; Akpom 82'; Crespo (yellow card) 90+3'	Report	Vuković (yellow card) 31'; Guerrero (yellow card) 40'; Torosidis (yellow card) 60'; Podence 87'; Koka (yellow card) 90+3'	Stadium: Toumba Stadium; Attendance: 25,097; Referee: Jesús Gil Manzano (Spain); Man of the Match: Chuba Akpom

18 February 2019 21	Apollon Smyrnis	1–5	PAOK	Athens
19:00 EET, UTC+02:00	D'Urso 64'	Report	Pelkas 4'; Oliveira 9'; Biseswar 33'; Świderski 78'; Pedro Henrique 88'	Stadium: Georgios Kamaras Stadium; Attendance: 1,228; Referee: Angelos Evangelou (Athens); Man of the Match: Dimitrios Pelkas

24 February 2019 22	PAOK	1–1	Aris	Thessaloniki
19:30 EET, UTC+02:00	Varela (yellow card) 36'; Vieirinha 39'; Biseswar (yellow card) 45'; Matos (yellow card) 52'	Report	Tzanakakis (yellow card) 21'; Vélez (yellow card) 65' (goal) 85'; Korhut (yellow card) 73'	Stadium: Toumba Stadium; Attendance: 22,544; Referee: Tore Hansen (Norway); Man of the Match: Vieirinha

3 March 2019 23	Panathinaikos	0–2	PAOK	Marousi
19:00 EET, UTC+02:00	Johansson (yellow card) 49'; Emmanouilidis (yellow card) 57'	Report	Maurício 2'; Jabá 47' (red card) 72'	Stadium: Olympic Stadium; Attendance: 9,453; Referee: Jakob Kehlet (Denmark); Man of the Match: Alexandros Paschalakis

10 March 2019 24	PAOK	3–0	Atromitos	Thessaloniki
17:15 EET, UTC+02:00	Vieirinha (penalty missed) 16'; Pedro Henrique (yellow card) 32'; Oliveira 39'; Biseswar 45+3' (pen.); Świderski 81'	Report	Bruno (yellow card) 19' (yellow-red card) 90'; Stroungis (yellow card) 34'; Madson (yellow card) 65'	Stadium: Toumba Stadium; Attendance: 19,941; Referee: Aliyar Aghayev (Azerbaijan); Man of the Match: Chuba Akpom

16 March 2019 25	Panetolikos	1–2	PAOK	Agrinio
19:00 EET, UTC+02:00	Díaz (yellow card) 20'; Bajrovic 55' (pen.)	Report	Biseswar (yellow card) 25'; Oliveira (yellow card) 36'; Vieirinha (yellow card) 57' (goal) 64'; Matos 67'; Jabá (yellow card) 83'	Stadium: Panetolikos Stadium; Attendance: 3,520; Referee: Alexandros Tsamouris (Piraeus); Man of the Match: Vieirinha

31 March 2019 26	Xanthi	1–2	PAOK	Xanthi
19:00 EET, UTC+02:00	Almeida (yellow card) 6' (goal) 85'; William (yellow card) 74'; Casado (yellow card) 90'	Report	Oliveira 33' (yellow card) 84'; Pedro Henrique 67'	Stadium: Xanthi FC Arena; Attendance: 6,558; Referee: Angelos Evangelou (Athens); Man of the Match: Yevhen Shakhov

7 April 2019 27	PAOK	3–0	Lamia	Thessaloniki
19:30 EET, UTC+02:00	Crespo (yellow card) 24'; Pedro Henrique 34'; El Kaddouri (yellow card) 71'; Shakhov 78'; Biseswar 83'	Report	Scardovelli (yellow card) 17'; Bertoglio (yellow card) 36'; Bejarano (yellow card) 38'; Asigba (yellow card) 67'	Stadium: Toumba Stadium; Attendance: 22,125; Referee: Georgios Tasis (Epirus); Man of the Match: Diego Biseswar

14 April 2019 28	AEL	1–1	PAOK	Larissa
19:00 EET, UTC+02:00	Fatjon (yellow card) 6'; Jakimovski 64'; Bralić (yellow card) 87'	Report	Limnios (yellow card) 51'; Pelkas 55'	Stadium: AEL FC Arena; Attendance: 4,082; Referee: Vasilios Fotias (Pella); Man of the Match: Dimitrios Pelkas

21 April 2019 29	PAOK	5–0	Levadiakos	Thessaloniki
19:00 EET, UTC+02:00	Shakhov 2', 60'; Biseswar 8' (pen.); Pelkas (penalty missed) 30'; Varela 53'; Świderski 81'	Report		Stadium: Toumba Stadium; Attendance: 26,007; Referee: Athanasios Tzilos (Larissa); Man of the Match: Yevhen Shakhov

5 May 2019 30	PAS Giannina	0–2	PAOK	Ioannina
19:00 EET, UTC+02:00	Križman (yellow card) 29'; Tzimopoulos (yellow card) 56'; Kargas (yellow card) 57'; Fabry Castro (yellow card) 62'; Pantelić (yellow card) 66'; Michael (yellow card) 78'	Report	Pelkas (yellow card) 58'; Akpom 60'; Ingason (yellow card) 73'; Cañas (yellow card) 74'; Shakhov 79'	Stadium: Zosimades Stadium; Attendance: 2,802; Referee: Anastasios Sidiropoulos (Dodecanese); Man of the Match: Dimitrios Pelkas

• Man of the Match as has been voted by PAOK fans on official PAOK website and mobile app.

=== Greek Football Cup ===
PAOK entered the competition as the two-time defending champions, having won consecutive editions in 2016–17 and 2017–18.

==== Group stage ====
Pos	Team	Pld	W	D	L	GF	GA	GD	Pts	Qualification	PAOK	ERG	ARIS	AIT
1	PAOK	3	2	1	0	9	2	+7	7	Round of 16		—	1–1	—
2	Ergotelis	3	1	1	1	5	5	0	4	Round of 16	1–2		3–2	—
3	Aris	3	1	1	1	5	5	0	4		—	—		2–1
4	Aittitos Spata	3	0	1	2	2	9	−7	1		0–6	1–1	—	

Source: epo.gr
Rules for classification: 1. Points 2. Head-to-head points 3. Head-to-head goal difference 4. Goals scored 5. Goals against 6. Play-offs (neutral ground).

Win Draw Loss

26 September 2018 1	PAOK	1–1	Aris	Thessaloniki
19:00 EET, UTC+03:00	Kitsiou (yellow card) 2' (yellow-red card) 59'; Pelkas 25' (pen.); El Kaddouri (yellow card) 45'; Wernbloom (yellow card) 87'	Report	Younés (yellow card) 14'; Siopis (yellow card) 42'; García 45+3'; Colazo (yellow card) 81'	Stadium: Toumba Stadium; Referee: Anastasios Sidiropoulos (Dodecanese); Man of the Match: Léo Jabá

14 November 2018 2	Ergotelis	1–2	PAOK	Heraklion
15:00 EET, UTC+02:00	Kozoronis (yellow card) 61'; Iatroudis 68'; Boutsakis (yellow card) 90+3'	Report	Biseswar 11'; Jabá (yellow card) 63'; Wernbloom 79'	Stadium: Pankritio Stadium; Referee: Stefanos Koubarakis (Thrace); Man of the Match: Diego Biseswar

20 December 2018 3	Aittitos Spata	0–6	PAOK	Spata
17:15 EET, UTC+03:00		Report	Karelis 16', 75'; Cañas 26'; Prijović 63', 84', 85'	Stadium: Spata Municipal Stadium; Referee: Angelos Evangelou (Athens); Man of the Match: Aleksandar Prijović

==== Round of 16 ====
8 January 2019 1st leg	Panachaiki	2–1	PAOK	Patras
17:00 EET, UTC+03:00	Plegas (yellow card) 14'; Loumbardeas (yellow card) 18' (goal) 68'; Bastakos 35'	Report	Karelis 56'; Pelkas (yellow card) 86'	Stadium: Kostas Davourlis Stadium; Referee: Georgios Tzovaras (Phthiotis); Man of the Match: Alexandros Paschalakis

22 January 2019 2nd leg	PAOK	5–0 (6–2 agg.)	Panachaiki	Thessaloniki
19:30 EET, UTC+03:00	Matos 5'; Jabá 37', 54'; Limnios 46'; Mišić (yellow card) 62' (goal) 67'	Report	Papatolios (yellow card) 8'; Argyropoulos (yellow card) 43'; Moustakopoulos (yellow card) 43'	Stadium: Toumba Stadium; Referee: Angelos Evangelou (Athens); Man of the Match: Chuba Akpom

==== Quarter-finals ====
6 February 2019 1st leg	Panionios	2–1	PAOK	Nea Smyrni
19:00 EET, UTC+03:00	Stavropoulos (yellow card) 37' (goal) 90+1'; Papageorgiou (yellow card) 48'; Durmishaj 74'	Report	Lyratzis (yellow card) 19'; Świderski 58'; Pedro Henrique (yellow card) 62'; Akpom (yellow card) 88'	Stadium: Nea Smyrni Stadium; Referee: Aristotelis Diamantopoulos (Arcadia); Man of the Match: Dimitrios Pelkas

27 February 2019 2nd leg	PAOK	4–2 (a.e.t.) (5–4 agg.)	Panionios	Thessaloniki
19:30 EET, UTC+03:00	Giannoulis (yellow card) 26'; Crespo (yellow card) 28'; Biseswar 32'; Limnios (yellow card) 38'; Oliveira (yellow card) 52'; Świderski 83'; Akpom 114'; Vieirinha 119' (pen.)	Report	Papageorgiou (yellow card) 22'; Durmishaj (yellow card) 22' (goal) 34'; Korbos (yellow card) 57'; Kotnik (yellow card) 63'; Manthatis (yellow card) 64' (yellow-red card) 118'; Domingues (yellow card) 67'; Kocic (yellow card) 71'; Maniatis (yellow card) 90'; Camara 94' (yellow card) 99'; Banana (yellow card) 120'	Stadium: Toumba Stadium; Referee: Manolis Skoulas (Thessaly); Man of the Match: José Ángel Crespo

==== Semi-finals ====
3 April 2019 1st leg	PAOK	2–0	Asteras Tripolis	Thessaloniki
19:00 EET, UTC+02:00	Matos 17', 90+6'; Ingason (yellow card) 66'; El Kaddouri (yellow card) 73'	Report	Athanasiadis (yellow card) 18'; Kyriakopoulos (yellow card) 45+1'; Iglesias (yellow card) 60' (yellow-red card) 90+4'; Kaltsas (yellow card) 90+4'	Stadium: Toumba Stadium; Referee: Stefanos Koubarakis (Thrace); Man of the Match: Léo Matos

25 April 2019 2nd leg	Asteras Tripolis	0–0 (0–2 agg.)	PAOK	Tripoli
16:00 EET, UTC+02:00	Triantafyllopoulos (yellow card) 37'	Report	Oliveira (yellow card) 76'; Ingason (yellow card) 85'	Stadium: Theodoros Kolokotronis Stadium; Referee: Angelos Evangelou (Athens); Man of the Match: Alexandros Paschalakis

==== Final ====
11 May 2019 Greek Cup Final	AEK Athens	0–1	PAOK	Marousi
20:30 EET, UTC+02:00	Oikonomou (yellow card) 26'; Livaja (yellow card) 28'; Krstičić (yellow card) 43'; Ponce (yellow card) 67'; Galo (yellow card) 90+6'	Report	Akpom (yellow card) 38' (goal) 45+1'	Stadium: Olympic Stadium; Attendance: 1,040; Referee: Felix Zwayer (Germany); Man of the Match: Chuba Akpom^{*}
Note: Match was played behind closed doors. Deputy Minister for Sports Giorgos Vassiliadis acknowledged in a statement that the authorities were unable to ensure the security of the final, citing recent tension between hardcore fans of the two clubs. The unusual decision followed violent clashes between PAOK and AEK hooligans in the two previous finals of the Cup, in Volos in 2017 and at the Olympic Stadium itself in 2018.^{*} Dimitrios Pelkas was voted Man of the Match by PAOK fans. Chuba Akpom earned the MVP of the Final award.

=== UEFA Champions League ===
==== Second qualifying round ====
Win Draw Loss

24 July 2018 1st leg	PAOK (Greece)	2–1	(Switzerland) Basel	Thessaloniki, Greece
20:30 EET, UTC+03:00	Cañas 32'; Prijović 80'	Report	Serey Dié (yellow card) 32'; Stocker (yellow card) 69'; Frei (yellow card) 75'; Ajeti 82'	Stadium: Toumba Stadium; Attendance: 24,670; Referee: Bobby Madley (England)

1 August 2018 2nd leg	Basel (Switzerland)	0–3 (1–5 agg.)	(Greece) PAOK	Basel, Switzerland
21:00 EET, UTC+03:00	Zuffi (yellow card) 33'; Serey Dié (yellow card) 44'; Suchý (yellow card) 63'	Report	Varela 7'; Prijović (yellow card) 16' (goal) 52'; Matos (yellow card) 48'; El Kaddouri 60'; Pelkas (yellow card) 77'	Stadium: St. Jakob-Park; Attendance: 14,328; Referee: Paolo Valeri (Italy)

==== Third qualifying round ====
Win Draw Loss

8 August 2018 1st leg	PAOK (Greece)	3–2	(Russia) Spartak Moscow	Thessaloniki, Greece
20:00 EET, UTC+03:00	Prijović 29' (pen.); Limnios 37'; Pelkas 44'; El Kaddouri (yellow card) 58'; Khacheridi (yellow card) 69'; Maurício (yellow card) 77'	Report	Popov 7'; Promes 17' (penalty missed) 71'; Gigot (yellow card) 19'; Zobnin (yellow card) 40'; Lomovitski (yellow card) 72'; Fernando (yellow card) 83'	Stadium: Toumba Stadium; Attendance: 24,463; Referee: Orel Grinfeld (Israel)

14 August 2018 2nd leg	Spartak Moscow (Russia)	0–0 (2–3 agg.)	(Greece) PAOK	Moscow, Russia
20:30 EET, UTC+03:00	Fernando (yellow card) 22'; Luiz Adriano (red card) 33'; Dzhikiya (yellow card) 37'; Zobnin (yellow card) 86'	Report	Matos (yellow card) 25'; Paschalakis (yellow card) 34'; El Kaddouri (yellow card) 37'	Stadium: Otkritie Arena; Attendance: 40,385; Referee: Ruddy Buquet (France)

==== Play-off round ====
Win Draw Loss

21 August 2018 1st leg	Benfica (Portugal)	1–1	(Greece) PAOK	Lisbon, Portugal
22:00 EET, UTC+03:00	Pizzi 45' (pen.); Fernandes (yellow card) 52'; Almeida (yellow card) 83'	Report	Vieirinha (yellow card) 71'; Warda 76' (yellow card) 89'; Pelkas (yellow card) 84'	Stadium: Estádio da Luz; Attendance: 44,084; Referee: Milorad Mažić (Serbia)

29 August 2018 2nd leg	PAOK (Greece)	1–4 (2–5 agg.)	(Portugal) Benfica	Thessaloniki, Greece
22:00 EET, UTC+03:00	Matos (yellow card) 8' (yellow-red card) 76'; Prijović 13'; Maurício (yellow card) 33'; Varela (yellow card) 49'; Pelkas (yellow card) 75'; Shakhov (yellow card) 84'	Report	Almeida (yellow card) 1'; Jardel 20' (yellow card) 34'; Salvio 26' (pen.), 49' (pen.); Pizzi 39'	Stadium: Toumba Stadium; Attendance: 26,725; Referee: Felix Brych (Germany)

=== UEFA Europa League ===
==== Group stage ====
Group stage (Group L)

Pos	Team	Pld	W	D	L	GF	GA	GD	Pts	Qualification	CHL	BATE	VID	PAOK
1	(England) Chelsea	6	5	1	0	12	3	+9	16	Advance to knockout phase	—	3–1	1–0	4–0
2	(Belarus) BATE Borisov	6	3	0	3	9	9	0	9	Advance to knockout phase	0–1	—	2–0	1–4
3	(Hungary) Vidi	6	2	1	3	5	7	−2	7		2–2	0–2	—	1–0
4	(Greece) PAOK	6	1	0	5	5	12	−7	3		0–1	1–3	0–2	—

Source: UEFA
Rules for classification: Group stage tiebreakers

Win Draw Loss

20 September 2018 1	PAOK (Greece)	0–1	(England) Chelsea	Thessaloniki, Greece
19:55 EEST	Wernbloom (yellow card) 87'; Warda (yellow card) 90+1'; El Kaddouri (yellow card) 90+3'	Report	Willian 7'; Azpilicueta (yellow card) 90'; Rüdiger (yellow card) 90+1'	Stadium: Toumba Stadium; Attendance: 24,310; Referee: Alberto Undiano Mallenco (Spain)

4 October 2018 2	BATE Borisov (Belarus)	1–4	(Greece) PAOK	Barysaw, Belarus
22:00 EEST	Valadzko (yellow card) 46'; Crespo 61' (o.g.)	Report	Prijović 6'; Jabá 11', 17'; Pelkas 73'	Stadium: Borisov Arena; Attendance: 10,527; Referee: Robert Schörgenhofer (Austria)

25 October 2018 3	PAOK (Greece)	0–2	(Hungary) MOL Vidi	Thessaloniki, Greece
22:00 EEST		Report	Huszti 12'; Hadžić (yellow card) 23'; Stopira 45'; Nego (yellow card) 73'; Fiola (yellow card) 75'; Hodžić (yellow card) 85'	Stadium: Toumba Stadium; Attendance: 15,118; Referee: Yevhen Aranovskiy (Ukraine)

8 November 2018 4	MOL Vidi (Hungary)	1–0	(Greece) PAOK	Budapest, Hungary
19:55 EST	Fiola (yellow card) 20'; Hadžić (yellow card) 49'; Milanov 50'; Nikolov (yellow card) 57'	Report	Jabá (yellow card) 29'; El Kaddouri (yellow card) 47'; Limnios (yellow card) 82'	Stadium: Groupama Arena; Attendance: 17,208; Referee: Ali Palabıyık (Turkey)

29 November 2018 5	Chelsea (England)	4–0	(Greece) PAOK	London, England
22:00 EST	Giroud 27', 37'; Cahill (yellow card) 54'; Hudson-Odoi 60'; Morata 78'	Report	Khacheridi (red card) 7'; Wernbloom (yellow card) 50'; Pelkas (yellow card) 80'	Stadium: Stamford Bridge; Attendance: 33,933; Referee: Kristo Tohver (Estonia)

13 December 2018 6	PAOK (Greece)	1–3	(Belarus) BATE Borisov	Thessaloniki, Greece
19:55 EST	Vieirinha (yellow card) 36'; Matos (yellow card) 41'; Prijović 59'	Report	Skavysh 18'; Baha (yellow card) 27'; Signevich 42' (pen.), 45+1' (red card) 61'; Ryas (yellow card) 72'; Yablonskiy (yellow card) 90+5'	Stadium: Toumba Stadium; Referee: Tobias Welz (Germany)

== Statistics ==
=== Squad statistics ===
As of 11 May 2019

Appearances denote players in the starting lineup, with the numbers in parentheses denoting appearances as substitute.

No.	Name	Super League		Greek Cup		Champions League		Europa League		Total	
No.	Name	Apps	Goals	Apps	Goals	Apps	Goals	Apps	Goals	Apps	Goals
Goalkeepers
1	(Argentina) Rodrigo Rey	0	0	3	0	0	0	0	0	3	0
31	(Greece) Alexandros Paschalakis	30	0	7	0	6	0	6	0	49	0
60	(Greece) Symeon Papadopoulos	0	0	0	0	0	0	0	0	0	0
71	(Greece) Panagiotis Glykos	0	0	0	0	0	0	0	0	0	0
99	(Greece) Marios Siampanis	0	0	0	0	0	0	0	0	0	0
Defenders
3	(Brazil) Léo Matos	27	3	5 (2)	3	6	0	5	0	43 (2)	6
4	(Iceland) Sverrir Ingason	1	0	4 (1)	0	0	0	0	0	5 (1)	0
5	(Cape Verde) Fernando Varela	27	2	5	0	6	1	5 (1)	0	43 (1)	3
6	(Romania) Alin Toșca	4 (2)	0	4	0	0	0	4 (1)	0	12 (3)	0
13	(Greece) Stelios Malezas	0 (1)	0	3	0	0	0	0	0	3 (1)	0
15	(Spain) José Ángel Crespo	30	1	6 (1)	0	6	0	5	0	47 (1)	1
20	(Portugal) Vieirinha	24 (2)	5	3	1	4	0	3 (1)	0	34 (3)	6
23	(Greece) Dimitris Giannoulis	3 (5)	0	4	0	0	0	0	0	7 (5)	0
32	(Greece) Lefteris Lyratzis	0 (1)	0	1 (2)	0	0	0	0	0	1 (3)	0
34	(Ukraine) Yevhen Khacheridi	2 (1)	0	3	0	2 (1)	0	2	0	9 (2)	0
Midfielders
7	(Morocco) Omar El Kaddouri	10 (7)	1	4 (2)	0	4 (1)	1	4	0	22 (10)	2
8	(Brazil) Maurício	19 (1)	5	2	0	6	0	4	0	31 (1)	5
10	(Greece) Dimitrios Pelkas	17 (5)	3	4 (2)	1	6	1	4 (1)	1	31 (8)	6
19	(Sweden) Pontus Wernbloom	5 (6)	0	2	1	0	0	3	0	10 (6)	1
21	(Suriname) Diego Biseswar	26 (1)	8	6 (3)	2	0	0	0 (4)	0	32 (8)	10
26	(Portugal) Sérgio Oliveira	8 (3)	3	3 (2)	0	0	0	0	0	11 (5)	3
27	(Croatia) Josip Mišić	1 (4)	0	2 (3)	1	0	0	0	0	3 (7)	1
28	(Ukraine) Yevhen Shakhov	16 (5)	5	7 (2)	0	0 (6)	0	4	0	27 (13)	5
53	(Greece) Konstantinos Balogiannis	0	0	0 (1)	0	0	0	0	0	0 (1)	0
87	(Spain) José Cañas	11 (3)	0	3 (1)	1	6	1	3	0	23 (4)	2
Forwards
9	(Poland) Karol Świderski	3 (8)	4	2 (2)	2	0	0	0	0	5 (10)	6
11	(Greece) Nikos Karelis	1 (4)	0	3 (1)	3	0	0	1	0	5 (5)	3
18	(Greece) Dimitrios Limnios	14 (6)	1	6 (1)	1	6	1	4	0	30 (7)	3
47	(England) Chuba Akpom	13 (7)	6	6 (2)	2	0 (2)	0	0 (3)	0	19 (14)	8
90	(Brazil) Pedro Henrique	3 (4)	3	2	0	0	0	0	0	5 (4)	3
98	(Brazil) Léo Jabá	16 (8)	3	6 (1)	2	2 (2)	0	5	2	29 (11)	7
Players transferred out during the season
9	(Serbia) Aleksandar Prijović	13	9	0 (2)	3	6	4	4 (2)	2	23 (4)	18
70	(Greece) Stelios Kitsiou	2	0	3	0	0	0	0	0	5	0
74	(Egypt) Amr Warda	4 (5)	0	2	0	0 (6)	1	0 (5)	0	6 (16)	1

=== Goalscorers ===
Rank	No.	Pos.	Player	Super League	Greek Cup	Champions League	Europa League	Total
1	9	CF	(Serbia) Aleksandar Prijović	9	3	4	2	18
2	21	MF	(Suriname) Diego Biseswar	8	2	0	0	10
3	47	FW	(England) Chuba Akpom	6	2	0	0	8
4	98	FW	(Brazil) Léo Jabá	3	2	0	2	7
5	20	LWB	(Portugal) Vieirinha	5	1	0	0	6
5	9	FW	(Poland) Karol Świderski	4	2	0	0	6
5	10	AM	(Greece) Dimitrios Pelkas	3	1	1	1	6
5	3	RWB	(Brazil) Léo Matos	3	3	0	0	6
9	8	MF	(Brazil) Maurício	5	0	0	0	5
9	28	MF	(Ukraine) Yevhen Shakhov	5	0	0	0	5
11	90	FW	(Brazil) Pedro Henrique	3	0	0	0	3
11	26	MF	(Portugal) Sérgio Oliveira	3	0	0	0	3
11	5	CB	(Cape Verde) Fernando Varela	2	0	1	0	3
11	18	FW	(Greece) Dimitrios Limnios	1	1	1	0	3
11	11	CF	(Greece) Nikos Karelis	0	3	0	0	3
16	7	MF	(Morocco) Omar El Kaddouri	1	0	1	0	2
16	87	DM	(Spain) José Cañas	0	1	1	0	2
18	15	DF	(Spain) José Ángel Crespo	1	0	0	0	1
18	74	MF	(Egypt) Amr Warda	0	0	1	0	1
18	19	MF	(Sweden) Pontus Wernbloom	0	1	0	0	1
18	27	MF	(Croatia) Josip Mišić	0	1	0	0	1
Own goals				4	0	0	0	4
TOTAL				66	23	10	5	104

=== Most assists ===
Rank	Pos.	Player	League	Cup	CL	EL	Total
1	FW	(Brazil) Léo Jabá	6	2	0	3	11
2	MF	(Suriname) Diego Biseswar	7	3	0	0	10
3	AM	(Greece) Dimitrios Pelkas	6	1	2	0	9
4	CF	(England) Chuba Akpom	4	1	0	0	5
4	FW	(Greece) Dimitrios Limnios	1	3	1	0	5
6	DF	(Portugal) Vieirinha	4	0	0	0	4
6	DF	(Cape Verde) Fernando Varela	3	0	1	0	4
6	DF	(Brazil) Léo Matos	2	0	2	0	4

=== Clean sheets ===
Player	League	Cup	CL	EL	Total	Games played	Percentage
(Greece) Alexandros Paschalakis	16	4	2	0	22	49	44.9 %
(Argentina) Rodrigo Rey	0	1	0	0	1	3	33.3 %
Total	16	5	2	0	23	52	44.2 %

=== Disciplinary record ===
S	P	N	Name	Super League			Cup			Champions League			Europa League			Total		
S	P	N	Name	Yellow card	Yellow-red card	Red card	Yellow card	Yellow-red card	Red card	Yellow card	Yellow-red card	Red card	Yellow card	Yellow-red card	Red card	Yellow card	Yellow-red card	Red card
3	DF	(Brazil)	Léo Matos	6	1	0	0	0	0	2	1	0	1	0	0	9	2	0
7	AM	(Morocco)	Omar El Kaddouri	4	0	0	2	0	0	2	0	0	2	0	0	10	0	0
98	FW	(Brazil)	Léo Jabá	3	1	1	1	0	0	0	0	0	1	0	0	5	1	1
20	DF	(Portugal)	Vieirinha	6	0	0	0	0	0	1	0	0	1	0	0	8	0	0
10	AM	(Greece)	Dimitrios Pelkas	3	0	0	1	0	0	3	0	0	1	0	0	8	0	0
28	MF	(Ukraine)	Yevhen Shakhov	6	0	0	0	0	0	1	0	0	0	0	0	7	0	0
19	MF	(Sweden)	Pontus Wernbloom	3	0	0	1	0	0	0	0	0	2	0	0	6	0	0
8	MF	(Brazil)	Maurício	3	0	0	0	0	0	2	0	0	0	0	0	5	0	0
21	MF	(Suriname)	Diego Biseswar	5	0	0	0	0	0	0	0	0	0	0	0	5	0	0
34	DF	(Ukraine)	Yevhen Khacheridi	2	0	0	0	0	0	1	0	0	0	0	1	3	0	1
87	MF	(Spain)	José Cañas	3	1	0	0	0	0	0	0	0	0	0	0	3	1	0
70	RB	(Greece)	Stelios Kitsiou	2	0	0	0	1	0	0	0	0	0	0	0	2	1	0
5	DF	(Cape Verde)	Fernando Varela	3	0	0	0	0	0	1	0	0	0	0	0	4	0	0
18	FW	(Greece)	Dimitrios Limnios	2	0	0	1	0	0	0	0	0	1	0	0	4	0	0
26	MF	(Portugal)	Sérgio Oliveira	2	0	0	2	0	0	0	0	0	0	0	0	4	0	0
31	GK	(Greece)	Alexandros Paschalakis	2	0	0	0	0	0	1	0	0	0	0	0	3	0	0
15	DF	(Spain)	José Ángel Crespo	2	0	0	1	0	0	0	0	0	0	0	0	3	0	0
4	DF	(Iceland)	Sverrir Ingi Ingason	1	0	0	2	0	0	0	0	0	0	0	0	3	0	0
74	FW	(Egypt)	Amr Warda	1	0	0	0	0	0	1	0	0	1	0	0	3	0	0
47	FW	(England)	Chuba Akpom	0	0	0	2	0	0	0	0	0	0	0	0	2	0	0
9	CF	(Serbia)	Aleksandar Prijović	1	0	0	0	0	0	1	0	0	0	0	0	2	0	0
23	DF	(Greece)	Dimitris Giannoulis	1	0	0	1	0	0	0	0	0	0	0	0	2	0	0
90	FW	(Brazil)	Pedro Henrique Konzen	1	0	0	1	0	0	0	0	0	0	0	0	2	0	0
27	MF	(Croatia)	Josip Mišić	0	0	0	1	0	0	0	0	0	0	0	0	1	0	0
32	DF	(Greece)	Lefteris Lyratzis	0	0	0	1	0	0	0	0	0	0	0	0	1	0	0

== Awards ==
=== Fans' Man of the Match award ===
As has been voted by PAOK fans on official PAOK website and mobile app.

Rank	Player	League	Cup	CL	EL	Total
1	(Greece) Alexandros Paschalakis	5	2	0	1	8
2	(England) Chuba Akpom	5	1	0	0	6
2	(Suriname) Diego Biseswar	4	1	0	1	6
4	(Greece) Dimitrios Pelkas	3	2	0	0	5
4	(Brazil) Léo Jabá	1	1	0	3	5
6	(Serbia) Aleksandar Prijović	1	1	1	1	4
7	(Spain) José Ángel Crespo	1	1	1	0	3
8	(Portugal) Vieirinha	2	0	0	0	2
8	(Ukraine) Yevhen Shakhov	2	0	0	0	2
8	(Brazil) Léo Matos	0	1	1	0	2
8	(Brazil) Maurício	1	0	1	0	2
8	(Greece) Dimitrios Limnios	1	0	1	0	2
13	(Cape Verde) Fernando Varela	1	0	0	0	1
13	(Spain) José Cañas	0	0	1	0	1
13	(Morocco) Omar El Kaddouri	1	0	0	0	1
13	(Poland) Karol Świderski	1	0	0	0	1
13	(Egypt) Amr Warda	1	0	0	0	1
Total		30	10	6	6	52

=== Player of the Month award ===
Awarded monthly to the player that was chosen by fans voting on paokfc.gr

Month	Player	Source
July–August	(Spain) José Ángel Crespo	
September	(Spain) José Ángel Crespo	
October	(Spain) José Cañas	
November	(Cape Verde) Fernando Varela	
December	(Serbia) Aleksandar Prijović	
January	(England) Chuba Akpom	
February	(Portugal) Vieirinha	
March	(Portugal) Vieirinha	
April	(Ukraine) Yevhen Shakhov	

=== Season MVP award ===
Player	Source
(Portugal) Vieirinha	

=== Best Goal of the season award ===
Player	Date	Venue	Opponent	Score	Result	Source
(Portugal) Vieirinha	16 March 2019	Panetolikos Stadium, Agrinio	Panetolikos	1–1	1–2	

== See also ==
- List of unbeaten football club seasons
