= 2019–20 PAOK FC season =

PAOK
2019–20 season
- President: Ivan Savvidis
- Manager: Abel Ferreira
- Stadium: Toumba Stadium
- Super League: 2nd
- Greek Cup: Semi-finals
- UEFA Champions League: Third qualifying round
- UEFA Europa League: Play-off round
- Top goalscorer: League: Karol Świderski (11); All: Karol Świderski (14)
- Highest home attendance: 26,377 vs Olympiacos (23 February 2020)
- Lowest home attendance: 11,995 vs Volos (27 January 2020)
Home colours	Away colours	Third colours

The 2019–20 season was PAOK Football Club's 94th in existence and the club's 61st consecutive season in the top flight of Greek football. The team attempted to defend their Super League and Greek Football Cup titles won during the 2018–19 season, and also competed in the play-offs to qualify for the UEFA Europa League.

== Coaching staff ==
Position	Staff
Head coach	(Portugal) Abel Ferreira
Assistant Coach	(Portugal) Carlos Martinho
Assistant Coach	(Portugal) Vítor Castanheira
Assistant Coach	(Greece) Alexandros Maniatoglou
Trainer	(Portugal) Joao Martins
Trainer	(Greece) Anestis Aslanidis
Team Manager	(Greece) Dimitrios Saraidaris
Goalkeeping coach	(Greece) Giorgos Skiathitis
Head Gymnast Rehabilitation	(Greece) Georgios Tsonakas
Rehabilitation Trainer	(Greece) Vasilios Kanaras
Fitness Coach	?
Data Analyst (Vis-Track)	(Greece) Ioannis Tsaniklidis
Opponent Analysis	(Greece) Ioannis Thomaidis
Opponent Analysis	(Greece) Makis Kosmidis
Head of Medical Services	(Greece) Efthymis Papasoulis
Club's Doctor	(Greece) Kostas Tziantzis
Exercise Physiology	(Greece) Giorgos Ziogas
Nutritionist	(Greece) Ioanna Paspala
Physiotherapist	(Greece) Petros Nikolakoudis
Physiotherapist	(Greece) Nikolaos Tsirelas
Physiotherapist	(Greece) Athanasios Kapoulas
Physiotherapist	(Greece) Nikolaos Gagalis
Physiotherapist	(Greece) Nikolaos Mouratidis
Academy's Technical Director	(Spain) Daniel Bigas Alsina

Last updated: 29 December 2019
Source: PAOK FC

=== Other information ===
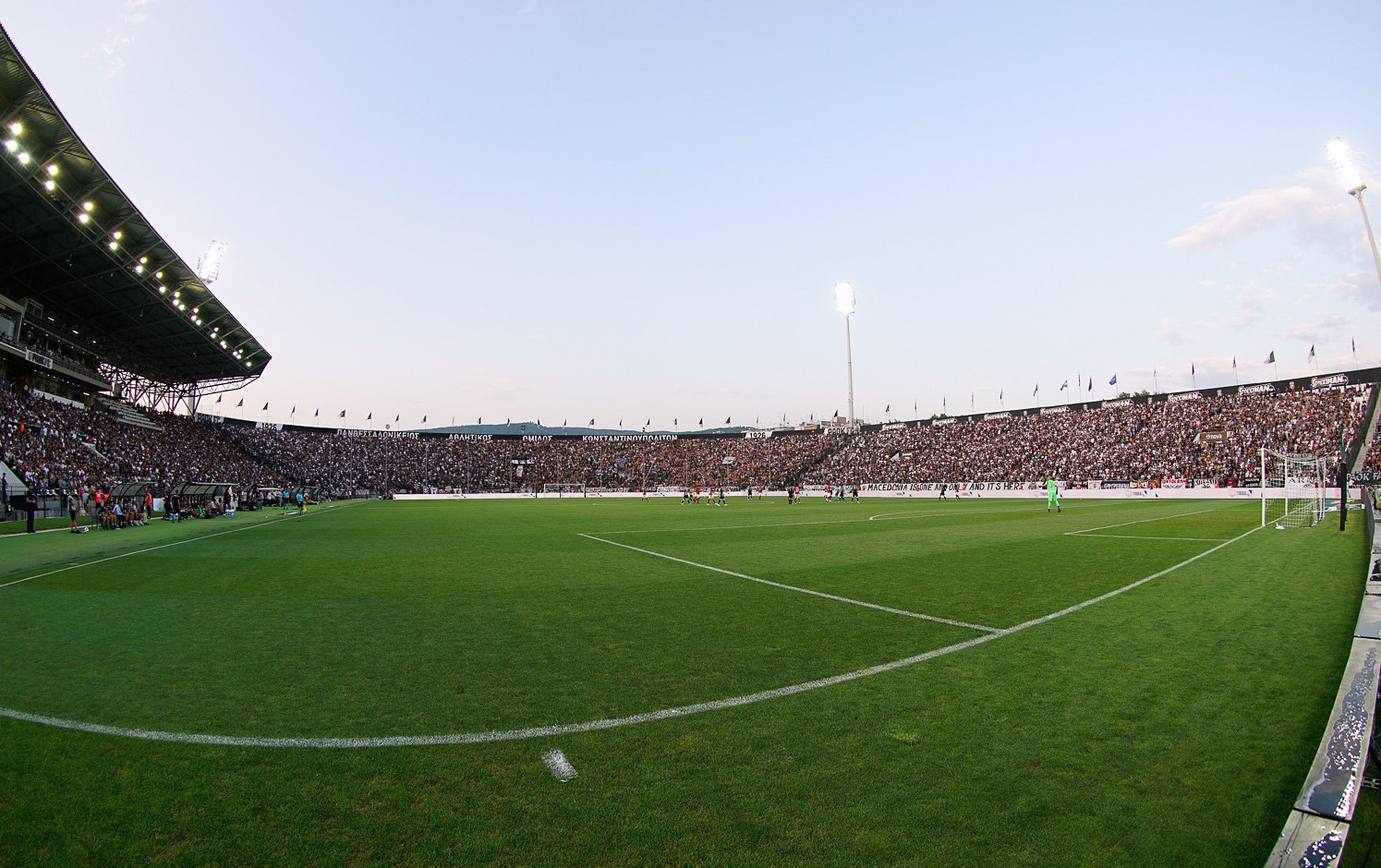
Toumba Stadium

Owner	Dimera Group Limited
Chairman	(Russia) (Greece) Ivan Savvidis
Vice-president & CEO	(Greece) Chrisostomos Gagatsis
Technical Director	(Portugal) Mário Branco
Members	(Russia) (Greece) Giorgos Savvidis (Russia) Maria Goncharova (Russia) Artur Davidyan (Greece) Dimokratis Papadopoulos (Greece) Ilias Gerontidis
Consultant of Football	(Greece) Giorgos Koudas
Ground (capacity and dimensions)	Toumba Stadium (29,000 / 106×71 metres)
Training Ground	PAOK Sport Center

Source: PAOK FC

== Players ==
=== Players in ===
No.	Pos.	Nat.	Name	Age	EU	Moving from	Type	Transfer window	Ends	Transfer fee	Source
33	MF	(Brazil)	Douglas Augusto	29	Non-EU	(Brazil) Corinthians	Transfer	Summer	2023	€3.0M	
22	FW	(Greece)	Lazaros Lamprou	28	EU	(Netherlands) Fortuna Sittard	Loan Return	Summer	2023	Free	
24	MF	(Nigeria)	Anderson Esiti	32	Non-EU	(Belgium) Gent	Transfer	Summer	2023	€3.5M	
99	MF	(Slovakia)	Miroslav Stoch	37	EU	(Czech Republic) Slavia Praha	Transfer	Summer	2023	€1.5M	

Total spending: ▼€8M

=== Players out ===
No.	Pos.	Nat.	Name	Age	EU	Moving to	Type	Transfer window	Transfer fee	Source
74	FW	(Egypt)	Amr Warda	33	Non-EU	(Greece) AEL	Loan	Summer	Free	
30	GK	(Greece)	Nikos Melissas	33	EU	(Greece) Volos	Loan	Summer	Free	
11	FW	(Brazil)	Pedro Henrique Konzen	36	Non-EU	(Turkey) Kayserispor	Transfer	Summer	650K	
1	GK	(Argentina)	Rodrigo Rey	35	EU	(Mexico) Pachuca	Loan	Summer	Free	
26	MF	(Albania)	Ergys Kaçe	33	Non-EU	(Greece) AEL	Loan	Summer	Free	
75	MF	(France)	Thibault Moulin	36	EU	(Greece) Xanthi	Loan	Summer	Free	
11	FW	(Greece)	Nikos Karelis	34	EU	(Belgium) Genk	End of Loan	Summer		
26	MF	(Portugal)	Sérgio Oliveira	34	EU	(Portugal) Porto	End of Loan	Summer		
13	DF	(Greece)	Stelios Malezas	41	EU	(Greece) Xanthi	End of contract	Summer		
27	FW	(Greece)	Giannis Mystakidis	31	EU	(Greece) Volos	Loan	Summer	Free	
–	DF	(Greece)	Marios Tsaousis	26	EU	(Greece) Volos	Loan	Summer	Free	
–	DF	(Greece)	Apostolos Diamantis	26	EU	(Greece) Volos	Loan	Summer	Free	
13	GK	(Greece)	Panagiotis Glykos	39	EU		End of contract	Summer		
–	DF	(Greece)	Lefteris Lyratzis	26	EU	(Greece) Volos	Loan	Summer	Free	
–	MF	(Greece)	Konstantinos Balogiannis	27	EU	(Greece) Volos	Loan	Summer	Free	
–	GK	(Greece)	Nikos Bourganis	29	EU	(Greece) Karaiskakis	Loan	Summer	Free	
–	MF	(Greece)	Anastasios Meletidis	27	EU	(Greece) Karaiskakis	Loan	Summer	Free	
–	MF	(Greece)	Zisis Chatzistravos	26	EU	(Greece) Karaiskakis	Loan	Summer	Free	
20	FW	(Greece)	Efthymis Koulouris	30	EU	(France) Toulouse	Transfer	Summer	3.5M + 15% resale fee	

▲ Total Income: €4.15M Net income: ▼€1.35M

== Pre-season and other friendlies ==
Win Draw Loss

03.07.2019 Friendly	AZ	1–0	PAOK	Sportpark Wiesel, Wenum-Wiesel
20:00 EEST	Stengs 45'

06.07.2019 Friendly	Nordsjælland	0–3	PAOK	Sportpark Wiesel, Wenum Wiesel
16:00 EEST			Akpom; Gaitanidis; Jabá

09.07.2019 Friendly	PEC Zwolle	2–2	PAOK	Sportpark Hulsterlanden, Nieuwleusen
20:00 EEST	Goal		Świderski; (red card) Pedro Henrique

12.07.2019 Friendly	Universitatea Cluj	0–5	PAOK	Cluj Arena, Cluj-Napoca
21:00 EEST			Limnios; Pelkas; Augusto; El Kaddouri; Gaitanidis

20.07.2019 Friendly	Sint-Truiden	0–4	PAOK	Mijnstadion, Beringen
17:00 EEST			Biseswar; Augusto; Jabá pen. Pedro Henrique

23.07.2019 Friendly	Anderlecht	1–3	PAOK	Complex Sportif Neerpede, Brussels
19:00 EEST	Goal		Pelkas; Akpom; Gaitanidis

27.07.2019 Friendly	PAOK	1–1	Al-Taawon	Horst
16:00 EEST	Ingason 81'		? 31'

27.07.2019 Friendly	Fortuna Sittard	1–5	PAOK	Sittard
20:00 EEST	Damașcan		Akpom; Pelkas	Stadium: Fortuna Sittard Stadion

13.11.2019 Friendly	Doxa Drama	1–3	PAOK	Drama
	Goal		(o.g.); Akpom; Lamprou

== Competitions ==
=== Overview ===
Competition	First match	Last match	Starting round	Final position	Record							
Competition	First match	Last match	Starting round	Final position	Pld	W	D	L	GF	GA	GD	Win %
Super League Greece	25 August 2019	19 July 2020	Matchday 1	Runner up	36	21	10	5	58	29	+29	58.33
Greek Cup	7 January 2020	24 June 2020	Round of 16	Semi-finals	6	5	0	1	13	5	+8	83.33
UEFA Champion's League	6 August 2019	13 August 2019	Third qualifying round	Third qualifying round	2	0	1	1	4	5	−1	0.00
UEFA Europa League	22 August 2019	29 August 2019	Play-offs	Play-offs	2	1	0	1	3	3	+0	50.00
Total					46	27	11	8	78	42	+36	58.70

Last updated: 19 July 2020.
Source: Competitions

=== Managerial statistics ===
Head coach	From	To	Record							
Head coach	From	To	G	W	D	L	GF	GA	GD	Win %
(Portugal) Abel Ferreira	01.07.2019	19.07.2020	46	27	11	8	76	40	+36	58.70

Last updated: 19 July 2020

=== Super League Greece ===
Pos	Team	Pld	W	D	L	GF	GA	GD	Pts	Qualification
1	Olympiacos	26	20	6	0	53	9	+44	66	Qualification for the Play-off round
2	PAOK	26	18	5	3	50	23	+27	59	Qualification for the Play-off round
3	AEK Athens	26	15	6	5	42	22	+20	51	Qualification for the Play-off round
4	Panathinaikos	26	12	8	6	35	23	+12	44	Qualification for the Play-off round
5	OFI	26	10	4	12	35	35	0	34 (Note: Head-to-head points: OFI 4, Aris 1.)	Qualification for the Play-off round

Source: Super League Greece
Rules for classification: 1) Points; 2) Head-to-head points; 3) Head-to-head goal difference; 4) Goal difference; 5) Goals scored; 6) Play-offs (neutral ground).
(Note: Criteria 6 is only used if needed to decide champion, teams for relegation or teams for UEFA competitions).

==== Results by round ====
Round	1	2	3	4	5	6	7	8	9	10	11	12	13	14	15	16	17	18	19	20	21	22	23	24	25	26
Ground	H	H	A	H	A	A	H	A	H	A	H	A	H	A	A	H	A	H	H	A	H	A	H	A	H	A
Result	W	W	W	D	D	W	W	W	D	W	W	D	W	W	W	W	L	W	W	W	W	L	W	W	L	D
Position	1	1	2	2	3	3	2	2	2	2	2	2	2	2	2	1	2	2	2	2	1	2	2	2	2	2

Updated to match(es) played on 1 March 2020. Source: League matches
A = Away; H = Home; W = Win; D = Draw; L = Loss

==== Matches ====
Sunday, 25 August 2019 1	PAOK	2–1	Panetolikos	Thessaloniki
20:00 EET, UTC+02:00	Świderski 27'; Augusto (yellow card) 29'; Mišić 76'		90+2'	Stadium: Toumba; Attendance: 17,968; Referee: Aristotelis Diamantopoulos (Arcadia); Man of the Match: Giannoulis

Sunday, 1 September 2019 2	PAOK	2–1	Panionios	Thessaloniki
19:30 EET, UTC+02:00	Akpom 14'; Esiti (yellow card) 70'; Świderski 74'		57'	Stadium: Toumba; Attendance: 15,793; Referee: Anastasios Papapetrou (Athens); Man of the Match: Świderski

Saturday, 14 September 2019 3	Atromitos	2–3	PAOK	Athens
19:00 EET, UTC+02:00	53' 37'		16' (yellow card) 90+5' Akpom; 22' Matos; 90+2' Crespo	Stadium: Peristeri Stadium; Attendance: 2,053; Referee: Georgios Tzovaras (Phthiotis); Man of the Match: Mišić

Sunday, 22 September 2019 4	PAOK	2–2	Aris	Thessaloniki
19:30 EET, UTC+02:00	Matos 6' (yellow card) 30' (yellow-red card) 68'; Mišić (yellow card) 31' (goal) 90+9'; Akpom (yellow card) 61'		4'; 88'	Stadium: Toumba; Attendance: 23,926; Referee: Anastasios Sidiropoulos (Dodecanese); Man of the Match: Mišić

Sunday, 29 September 2019 5	AEK	2–2	PAOK	Athens
19:30 EET, UTC+02:00	54' 79'		16', 58' Świderski; (penalty missed) 25' Biseswar; (yellow card) 51' Giannoulis; (yellow card) 82' Jabá	Stadium: Olympic Stadium; Attendance: 32,576; Referee: Stephan Klossner (Switzerland); Man of the Match: Limnios

Sunday, 6 October 2019 6	Asteras Tripolis	1–2	PAOK	Tripoli
17:15 EET, UTC+02:00	58'		33' Świderski; 47' (o.g.); (yellow card) 65' Biseswar; (yellow card) 73' El Kaddouri; (yellow card) 80' Augusto	Stadium: Theodoros Kolokotronis; Attendance: 3,068; Referee: Evangelos Manouhos; Man of the Match: Świderski

Sunday, 20 October 2019 7	PAOK	3–0	Lamia	Thessaloniki
18:00 EET, UTC+02:00	Mišić 2'; Limnios 6'; Świderski 11'; Augusto (yellow card) 16'; Giannoulis (yellow card) 42'; Jabá (yellow card) 81'			Stadium: Toumba; Attendance: 19,013; Referee: Fotis Fotiadis (Kastoria); Man of the Match: Mišić

Saturday, 26 October 2019 8	Volos	0–2	PAOK	Volos
19:30 EET, UTC+03:00			Limnios 29'; Pelkas 74' (pen.)	Stadium: Panthessaliko Stadium; Attendance: 4,566; Referee: Angelos Evangelou (Athens); Man of the Match: Limnios

Sunday, 3 November 2019 9	PAOK	2–2	Panathinaikos	Thessaloniki
20:00 EET, UTC+02:00	Stoch (yellow card) 40'; Vieirinha 65', 90+11' (pen.); Biseswar (yellow card) 83'; Crespo (yellow card) 90'		44'; 87'	Stadium: Toumba; Attendance: 22,466; Referee: Slavko Vinčić (Slovenia); Man of the Match: Vieirinha

Saturday, 9 November 2019 10	OFI	0–1	PAOK	Heraklion
19:30 EET, UTC+03:00			(yellow card) 21' Matos; (yellow card) 41' El Kaddouri; 56' Mišić; (yellow card) 62' Giannoulis; (yellow card) 77' Ingason	Stadium: Theodoros Vardinogiannis; Attendance: 5,807; Referee: Athanasios Tzilos (Larissa); Man of the Match: Mišić

Sunday, 24 November 2019 11	PAOK	1–0	AEL	Thessaloniki
18:00 EET, UTC+02:00	Świderski 16'			Stadium: Toumba; Attendance: 17,398; Referee: Georgios Tasis (Epirus); Man of the Match: Świderski

Sunday, 1 December 2019 12	Olympiacos	1–1	PAOK	Piraeus
19:30 EET, UTC+03:00	64'		(yellow card) 21' Biseswar; 29' Ingason; (yellow card) 37' Augusto; (yellow card) 52' Mišić; (yellow card) 89' Pelkas; (yellow card) 90+4' Živković	Stadium: Georgios Karaiskakis; Attendance: 31,616; Referee: José María Sánchez Martínez (Spain); Man of the Match: Ingason

Saturday, 7 December 2019 13	PAOK	2–0	Xanthi	Thessaloniki
18:00 EET, UTC+02:00	Świderski (yellow card) 68'; Biseswar 80'; Maurício (yellow card) 83'; Crespo 88'			Stadium: Toumba; Attendance: 15,007; Referee: Vasilios Fotias (Pella); Man of the Match: Biseswar

Sunday, 15 December 2019 14	Panetolikos	0–3	PAOK	Agrinio
19:30 EET, UTC+02:00			7' (yellow card) 27' Pelkas; 66' Limnios; 69' Akpom; (yellow card) 74' Matos	Stadium: Panetolikos Stadium; Attendance: 2,127; Referee: Petros Tsagkarakis (Chania); Man of the Match: Akpom

Thursday, 19 December 2019 15	Panionios	0–2	PAOK	Athens
19:30 EET, UTC+03:00			48' Ingason; 62' (yellow card) 87' Akpom; (yellow card) 67' Giannoulis	Stadium: Nea Smyrni Stadium; Attendance: 1,474; Referee: Stefanos Koubarakis (Thrace); Man of the Match: Akpom

Monday, 23 December 2019 16	PAOK	5–1	Atromitos	Thessaloniki
18:00 EET, UTC+02:00	Vieirinha 13'; Ingason 34' 41'; Świderski 53' (pen.); Mišić 82'		56'	Stadium: Toumba; Attendance: 17,809; Referee: Dimitrios Karantonis (Imathia); Man of the Match: Ingason

Saturday, 4 January 2020 17	Aris	4–2	PAOK	Thessaloniki
19:30 EET, UTC+03:00	17'; 41'; 47'; 70'		10' Świderski; (yellow card) 69' Ingason; 77' Matos; (yellow card) 80' Giannoulis	Stadium: Kleanthis Vikelidis; Attendance: 16,249; Referee: Anastasios Papapetrou (Athens); Man of the Match: Mišić

Sunday, 12 January 2020 18	PAOK	1–0	AEK	Thessaloniki
19:30 EET, UTC+03:00	Vieirinha 57' (pen.); Matos (yellow card) 82'; Mišić (yellow card) 90+4'		(red card) 90+1'; (yellow card) 42' (yellow-red card) 90+5'	Stadium: Toumba; Attendance: 21,332; Referee: Orel Grinfeld (Israel); Man of the Match: Vieirinha

Sunday, 19 January 2020 19	PAOK	3–1	Asteras Tripolis	Thessaloniki
18:00 EET, UTC+03:00	Świderski 29'; Pelkas 59'; Lamprou 80'; Augusto (yellow card) 90+3'		84'	Stadium: Toumba; Attendance: 15,168; Referee: Manolis Skoulas (Thessaly); Man of the Match: Lamprou

Thursday, 23 January 2020 20	Lamia	0–1	PAOK	Lamia
19:00 EET, UTC+03:00			(yellow card) 13' Akpom; (yellow card) 22' Maurício; 33' (yellow card) 90+4' Matos; Augusto (yellow card) 90+1'	Stadium: Lamia Municipal Stadium; Attendance: 2,072; Referee: Athanasios Sezos (Kilkis); Man of the Match: Esiti

Monday, 27 January 2020 21	PAOK	1–0	Volos	Thessaloniki
18:00 EET, UTC+03:00	Vieirinha 60' (pen.); Esiti (yellow card) 90+1'			Stadium: Toumba; Attendance: 11,995; Referee: Aristomenis Koutsiaftis (Arta); Man of the Match: Limnios

Sunday, 2 February 2020 22	Panathinaikos	2–0	PAOK	Athens
19:30 EET, UTC+03:00	49' (pen.); 56'		Limnios (yellow card) 58'	Stadium: Olympic Stadium; Attendance: 19,133; Referee: Aliyar Aghayev (Azerbaijan); Man of the Match: Mišić

Sunday, 9 February 2020 23	PAOK	4–0	OFI	Thessaloniki
18:00 EET, UTC+03:00	Biseswar (penalty missed) 50' (yellow card) 80'; Akpom 50', 60' (pen.); Lamprou 66'; Mišić (yellow card) 70'; Augusto 83'			Stadium: Toumba; Attendance: 15,271; Referee: Fotis Fotiadis (Kastoria); Man of the Match: Akpom

Saturday, 15 February 2020 24	AEL	1–2	PAOK	Larissa
17:15 EET, UTC+03:00	67'		14' Limnios; 45+2' Augusto; (yellow card) 90+1' Ingason	Stadium: AEL FC Arena; Attendance: 3,120; Referee: Srđan Jovanović (Serbia); Man of the Match: Maurício

Sunday, 23 February 2020 25	PAOK	0–1	Olympiacos	Thessaloniki
19:30 EET, UTC+03:00			49'	Stadium: Toumba; Attendance: 26,377; Referee: Tobias Stieler (Germany); Man of the Match: Biseswar

Sunday, 1 March 2020 26	Xanthi	1–1	PAOK	Xanthi
19:00 EET, UTC+03:00	18'		4' Akpom; (yellow card) 45+3' Vieirinha; (yellow card) 62' Augusto; (yellow card) 75' Ingason; (yellow card) 83' Matos; (yellow card) 90+1' Mišić	Stadium: Xanthi FC Arena; Attendance: 1,808; Referee: Georgios Vreskas (Pieria); Man of the Match: Biseswar

• Man of the Match as has been voted by PAOK fans on official PAOK website and mobile app.

== Play-off round ==
The top six teams from Regular season will meet twice (10 matches per team) for places in 2020–21 UEFA Champions League and 2020–21 UEFA Europa League as well as deciding the league champion.

Pos	Team	Pld	W	D	L	GF	GA	GD	Pts	Qualification
1	Olympiacos (C)	36	28	7	1	74	16	+58	91	Qualification for the Champions League play-off round
2	PAOK	36	21	10	5	58	29	+29	73	Qualification for the Champions League second qualifying round
3	AEK Athens	36	20	9	7	59	32	+27	69	Qualification for the Europa League third qualifying round
4	Panathinaikos (Note: Panathinaikos were banned from UEFA club competitions for the first season they would qualify between the 2018–19 and 2020–21 seasons by the UEFA Club Financial Control Body on 24 April 2018 due to overdue payables, and since they did not qualify for either the 2018–19 or 2019–20 season, they were banned from the 2020–21 season.)	36	15	13	8	43	32	+11	58	
5	Aris	36	10	12	14	48	51	−3	42	Qualification for the Europa League second qualifying round
6	OFI	36	10	6	20	43	56	−13	36	Qualification for the Europa League second qualifying round

Source: Super League Greece
Rules for classification: 1) Points; 2) Head-to-head points; 3) Head-to-head goal difference; 4) Goals scored; 5) Goals against; 6) Play-offs (neutral ground); 7) Draw.
(Note: Criteria 6 is only used if needed to decide champion, teams for relegation or teams for UEFA competitions).
(C) Champions

=== Results by round ===
Round	1	2	3	4	5	6	7	8	9	10
Ground	H	A	H	A	H	A	H	A	A	H
Result	L	D	W	W	L	D	D	W	D	D
Position	2	3	2	2	3	3	2	2	2	2

Updated to match(es) played on 19 July 2020. Source: League matches
A = Away; H = Home; W = Win; D = Draw; L = Loss

=== Matches ===
Sunday, 7 June 2020 1	PAOK	0–1	Olympiacos	Thessaloniki
19:30 EET, UTC+02:00	Varela (yellow card) 48'		23'	Stadium: Toumba; Attendance: C. doors due to COVID-19; Referee: Anastasios Papapetrou (Athens); Man of the Match: Pelkas

Saturday, 13 June 2020 2	Panathinaikos	0–0	PAOK	Athens
21:30 EET, UTC+02:00			(yellow card) 36'Pelkas; (yellow card) 53' El Kaddouri; (yellow card) 73' Matos; (yellow card) 90+1' Mauricio; (yellow card) 90+1' Giannoulis; (yellow card) 90+3' Lamprou	Stadium: Olympic Stadium; Attendance: C. doors due to COVID-19; Referee: Vasilios Fotias (Pella); Man of the Match: Esiti

Saturday, 20 June 2020 3	PAOK	3–1	OFI	Thessaloniki
20:30 EET, UTC+02:00	Tzolis 59' (yellow card) 84'; Akpom 90+1'; El Kaddouri (yellow card) 90+5' (goal) 90+10'		49'	Stadium: Toumba; Attendance: C. doors due to COVID-19; Referee: Fotis Fotiadis (Kastoria); Man of the Match: Tzolis

Sunday, 28 June 2020 4	Aris	0–2	PAOK	Thessaloniki
19:15 EET, UTC+02:00	(red card) 90+1'		(penalty missed) 3' 45+4' Świderski; (yellow card) 4' Mauricio; (yellow card) 15' Matos; 36' Varela; (yellow card) 65' Tzolis; (yellow card) 87' Paschalakis	Stadium: Kleanthis Vikelidis; Attendance: C. doors due to COVID-19; Referee: Felix Zwayer (Germany); Man of the Match: Stoch

Wednesday, 1 July 2020 5	PAOK	0–2	AEK	Thessaloniki
21:00 EET, UTC+02:00	Matos (yellow card) 31'; Ingason (yellow card) 79'; Varela (yellow card) 86'		Chyhrynskyi 42'; Livaja 81' (pen.)	Stadium: Toumba; Attendance: C. doors due to COVID-19; Referee: Marco Di Bello (Italy); Man of the Match: Michailidis

Saturday, 4 July 2020 6	OFI	2–2	PAOK	Heraklion
21:30 EET, UTC+02:00	18'; (yellow card) 28' (yellow-red card) 59'; 43'		5' Biseswar; (yellow card) 39' Rodrigo; (yellow card) 50' (yellow-red card) 81' Esiti; 80' Michailidis; (yellow card) 78' Akpom	Stadium: Theodoros Vardinogiannis; Attendance: C. doors due to COVID-19; Referee: Stefanos Koubarakis (Thrace); Man of the Match: Michailidis

Wednesday, 8 July 2020 7	PAOK	0–0	Panathinaikos	Thessaloniki
21:00 EET, UTC+02:00	El Kaddouri (yellow card) 35'; Biseswar (yellow card) 59'			Stadium: Toumba; Attendance: C. doors due to COVID-19; Referee: Damir Skomina (Slovenia); Man of the Match: Michailidis

Sunday, 12 July 2020 8	Olympiacos	0–1	PAOK	Piraeus
21:45 EET, UTC+02:00			(yellow card) 33' Giannoulis; (yellow card) 47' El Kaddouri; (yellow card) 52' Biseswar; (yellow card) 85' (goal) 90' Mihaj	Stadium: Georgios Karaiskakis; Attendance: C. doors due to COVID-19; Referee: Evangelos Manouhos; Man of the Match: Mihaj

Wednesday, 15 July 2020 9	AEK	0–0	PAOK	Athens
21:30 EET, UTC+02:00			(yellow card) 90' Michailidis	Stadium: Olympic Stadium; Attendance: C. doors due to COVID-19; Referee: Danny Makkelie (The Netherlands); Man of the Match: Michailidis

Sunday, 19 July 2020 10	PAOK	0–0	Aris	Thessaloniki
20:00 EET, UTC+02:00	El Kaddouri (yellow card) 18'; Świderski (yellow card) 45'; Vieirinha (red card) 90+5'			Stadium: Toumba; Attendance: C. doors due to COVID-19; Referee: Clement Turpin (France)

=== Greek Football Cup ===
PAOK entered the competition as the three-time defending champions, having won consecutive editions in 2016–17, 2017–18 and 2018–19.

==== Round of 16 ====
Tuesday, 7 January 2020 1st leg	OFI	0–3	PAOK	Heraklion
21:30 EET, UTC+03:00			24' Limnios; 32' Bisewar; (yellow card) 40' Ingason; 64' Akpom	Stadium: Theodoros Vardinogiannis; Attendance: ? Referee: Athanasios Sezos (Kilkis); Man of the Match: Mišić

Wednesday, 15 January 2020 2nd leg	PAOK	4–1 (7–1 agg.)	OFI	Thessaloniki
15:00 EET, UTC+03:00	Lamprou 12'; Pelkas 23' (pen.), 55'; Świderski 80'; Michailidis (yellow card) 89'		27'	Stadium: Toumba; Attendance: ? Referee: Georgios Vreskas (Pieria); Man of the Match: Lamprou

==== Quarter-finals ====
Wednesday, 5 February 2020 1st leg	PAOK	2–0	Panathinaikos	Thessaloniki
21:30 EET, UTC+03:00	Pelkas (yellow card) 8'; Vieirinha 34' (pen.); Mišić (yellow card) 43'; Fernando Varela 72' (yellow card) 90+2'			Stadium: Toumba; Attendance: ? Referee: Sandro Schärer (Switzerland); Man of the Match: Vieirinha

Wednesday, 12 February 2020 2nd leg	Panathinaikos	0–1 (0–3 agg.)	PAOK	Athens
20:00 EET, UTC+03:00			12' Świderski; (yellow card) 44' Maurício; (yellow card) 84' Limnios	Stadium: Olympic Stadium; Attendance: ? Referee: Michael Fabbri (Italy); Man of the Match: Pelkas

==== Semi-finals ====
Wednesday, 4 March 2020 1st leg	PAOK	3–2	Olympiacos	Thessaloniki
21:30 EET, UTC+03:00	Pelkas 10' (yellow card) 61' (goal) 69' (pen.); Mišić 12' (yellow card) 27'; Matos (yellow card) 43'; Maurício (yellow card) 80'; Giannoulis (red card) 85'		Hassan 3'; Guilherme 8'; Cissé (yellow card) 28'; Semedo (yellow card) 30'; Elabdellaoui (yellow card) 33'; Camara (yellow card) 71'	Stadium: Toumba; Referee: Javier Estrada Fernández (Spain); Man of the Match: Pelkas

Wednesday, 24 June 2020 2nd leg	Olympiacos	2–0 (4–3 agg.)	PAOK	Piraeus
21:30 EET, UTC+03:00	65'; 85'		(yellow card) 32' Esiti; (yellow card) 53' Ingason; (yellow card) 58' Dimitrios Limnios; (yellow card) 67' (yellow-red card) 90+3' El Kaddouri; (yellow card) 89' Varela	Stadium: Georgios Karaiskakis; Referee: Björn Kuipers (The Netherlands); Man of the Match: Tzolis

=== UEFA Champions League ===
==== Third qualifying round ====
Win Draw Loss

6 August 2019 1st leg	PAOK (Greece)	2–2	(Netherlands) Ajax	Thessaloniki, Greece
20:00 EEST	Matos (yellow card) 28', (goal) 39'; Akpom 32'	Report	Ziyech 10'; Mazraoui (yellow card) 37'; Huntelaar 57'	Stadium: Toumba Stadium; Attendance: 23,418; Referee: Slavko Vinčić (Slovenia); Man of the Match: Akpom

13 August 2019 2nd leg	Ajax (Netherlands)	3–2 (5–4 agg.)	(Greece) PAOK	Amsterdam, Netherlands
21:30 EEST	Martínez (yellow card) 26'; Tadić 43' (pen.), 84' (pen.); Dest (yellow card) 60'; Tagliafico 79'; Onana (yellow card) 90+4'	Report	Biseswar (yellow card) 79', (goal) 23', 90+4'; Pelkas (yellow card) 30'; El Kaddouri (yellow card) 50'; Paschalakis (yellow card) 55'; Giannoulis (yellow card) 65'; Matos (yellow card) 85'; Crespo (yellow card) 90+5'; Limnios (yellow card) 90+5'	Stadium: Johan Cruyff Arena; Attendance: 53,942; Referee: Craig Pawson (England); Man of the Match: Biseswar

=== UEFA Europa League ===
==== Qualifying rounds ====
22 August 2019 1st leg	Slovan Bratislava (Slovakia)	1–0	(Greece) PAOK	Bratislava, Slovakia
21:00 EEST	Medveděv (yellow card) 70'; Ljubičić (yellow card) 79'; Abena (yellow card) 79', (goal) 90+4'	Report	Matos (yellow card) 45'; Crespo (yellow card) 76'; Augusto (yellow card) 79'; Akpom (yellow card) 90+7'	Stadium: Tehelné pole Attendance: 20,233; Referee: Ivan Bebek (Croatia); Man of the Match: Esiti

29 August 2019 2nd leg	PAOK (Greece)	3–2 (3–3(a) agg.)	(Slovakia) Slovan Bratislava	Thessaloniki, Greece
20:00 EEST	Limnios 49'; Świderski 50'; Varela (yellow card) 75'; Živković (yellow card) 79'; Giannoulis 87'	Report	Medveděv 38'; De Marco 61'	Stadium: Toumba Stadium; Attendance: 20,776; Referee: Andreas Ekberg (Sweden); Man of the Match: Giannoulis

== Statistics ==
=== Squad statistics ===
As of 19 July 2020

Appearances denote players in the starting lineup, with the numbers in parentheses denoting appearances as substitute.

No.	Name	Super League		Greek Cup		Champions League		Europa League		Total	
No.	Name	Apps	Goals	Apps	Goals	Apps	Goals	Apps	Goals	Apps	Goals
Goalkeepers
31	(Greece) Alexandros Paschalakis	16	0	6	0	2	0	2	0	26	0
60	(Greece) Symeon Papadopoulos	0	0	0	0	0	0	0	0	0	0
88	(Serbia) Živko Živković	20	0	0	0	0	0	0	0	20	0
Defenders
2	(Brazil) Rodrigo Soares	7 (7)	0	2 (2)	0	0	0	1	0	10 (9)	0
3	(Brazil) Léo Matos	26 (4)	4	2	0	2	1	1	0	31 (4)	5
4	(Iceland) Sverrir Ingi Ingason	27 (1)	4	6	0	0	0	0	0	33 (1)	4
5	(Cape Verde) Fernando Varela	27 (1)	1	5	1	2	0	2	0	36 (1)	2
6	(Albania) Enea Mihaj	3 (1)	1	1 (1)	0	0	0	0	0	4 (2)	1
15	(Spain) José Ángel Crespo	15 (1)	2	0	0	2	0	2	0	19 (1)	2
20	(Portugal) Vieirinha	14 (6)	5	2 (1)	1	0	0	0	0	16 (7)	6
23	(Greece) Dimitris Giannoulis	34	0	6	0	2	0	2	1	44	1
49	(Greece) Giannis Michailidis	4 (3)	1	0 (2)	0	0	0	0	0	4 (5)	1
Midfielders
7	(Morocco) Omar El Kaddouri	16 (7)	1	2	0	2	0	2	0	22 (7)	1
8	(Brazil) Maurício	18 (9)	0	6	0	0	0	0	0	24 (9)	0
10	(Greece) Dimitrios Pelkas	11 (9)	3	4	4	2	0	2	0	19 (9)	7
19	(Sweden) Pontus Wernbloom	0	0	0	0	0	0	0	0	0	0
21	(Suriname) Diego Biseswar	24 (7)	2	4 (1)	1	2	2	2	0	32 (8)	5
24	(Nigeria) Anderson Esiti	12 (9)	0	2 (2)	0	2	0	2	0	18 (11)	0
27	(Croatia) Josip Mišić	25 (1)	5	4	1	0 (1)	0	0 (1)	0	29 (3)	6
33	(Brazil) Douglas Augusto	15 (3)	2	1	0	0 (1)	0	0 (2)	0	16 (6)	2
51	(Greece) Theocharis Tsingaras	0 (2)	0	0	0	0	0	0	0	0 (2)	0
Forwards
9	(Poland) Karol Świderski	23 (11)	11	2 (2)	2	0 (1)	0	0 (2)	1	25 (16)	14
18	(Greece) Dimitrios Limnios	27 (8)	4	4 (1)	1	0 (2)	0	1	1	32 (11)	6
47	(England) Chuba Akpom	14 (19)	8	4 (2)	1	2	1	2	0	22 (21)	10
98	(Brazil) Léo Jabá	2 (4)	0	0	0	2	0	1	0	5 (4)	0
99	(Slovakia) Miroslav Stoch	6 (5)	0	1 (1)	0	0 (1)	0	0 (1)	0	7 (8)	0
22	(Greece) Lazaros Lamprou	4 (6)	2	1 (4)	1	0	0	0	0	5 (10)	3
68	(Greece) Christos Tzolis	6 (3)	1	1	0	0	0	0	0	7 (3)	1
Players transferred out during the season

=== Goalscorers ===
Rank	No.	Pos.	Player	Super League	Greek Cup	Champions League	Europa League	Total
Own goals				0	0	0	0	0
TOTAL				0	0	0	0	0

=== Most assists ===
Rank	Player	Total

=== Clean sheets ===
Player	League	Cup	CL	EL	Total	Games played	Percentage
(Greece) Alexandros Paschalakis	6	3	0	0	9	26	34,62%
(Serbia) Živko Živković	11	0	0	0	11	20	55,00%
Total	17	3	0	0	20	46	43,48%

=== Disciplinary record ===
S	P	N	Name	Super League			Cup			Champions League			Europa League			Total		
S	P	N	Name	Yellow card	Yellow-red card	Red card	Yellow card	Yellow-red card	Red card	Yellow card	Yellow-red card	Red card	Yellow card	Yellow-red card	Red card	Yellow card	Yellow-red card	Red card
3	DF	(Brazil)	Léo Matos	8	1	0	1	0	0	2	0	0	1	0	0	12	1	0
7	AM	(Morocco)	Omar El Kaddouri	7	0	0	0	1	0	1	0	0	0	0	0	8	1	0
10	AM	(Greece)	Dimitrios Pelkas	3	0	0	2	0	0	1	0	0	0	0	0	6	0	0
21	MF	(Suriname)	Diego Biseswar	6	0	0	0	0	0	1	0	0	0	0	0	7	0	0
18	FW	(Greece)	Dimitrios Limnios	1	0	0	2	0	0	1	0	0	0	0	0	4	0	0
31	GK	(Greece)	Alexandros Paschalakis	1	0	0	0	0	0	1	0	0	0	0	0	2	0	0
15	DF	(Spain)	José Ángel Crespo	1	0	0	0	0	0	1	0	0	1	0	0	3	0	0
23	DF	(Greece)	Dimitris Giannoulis	7	0	0	0	0	1	1	0	0	0	0	0	8	0	1
33	DF	(Brazil)	Douglas Augusto	7	0	0	0	0	0	0	0	0	1	0	0	8	0	0
47	FW	(England)	Chuba Akpom	5	0	0	0	0	0	0	0	0	1	0	0	6	0	0
88	GK	(Serbia)	Živko Živković	1	0	0	0	0	0	0	0	0	1	0	0	2	0	0
5	DF	(Cape Verde)	Fernando Varela	2	0	0	2	0	0	0	0	0	1	0	0	5	0	0
24	MF	(Nigeria)	Anderson Esiti	2	1	0	1	0	0	0	0	0	0	0	0	3	1	0
27	MF	(Croatia)	Josip Mišić	5	0	0	2	0	0	0	0	0	0	0	0	7	0	0
98	FW	(Brazil)	Léo Jabá	2	0	0	0	0	0	0	0	0	0	0	0	2	0	0
99	FW	(Slovakia)	Miroslav Stoch	1	0	0	0	0	0	0	0	0	0	0	0	1	0	0
4	DF	(Iceland)	Sverrir Ingi Ingason	5	0	0	2	0	0	0	0	0	0	0	0	7	0	0
9	FW	(Poland)	Karol Świderski	2	0	0	0	0	0	0	0	0	0	0	0	2	0	0
8	MF	(Brazil)	Maurício	4	0	0	2	0	0	0	0	0	0	0	0	6	0	0
49	DF	(Greece)	Giannis Michailidis	1	0	0	1	0	0	0	0	0	0	0	0	2	0	0
20	DF	(Portugal)	Vieirinha	1	0	1	0	0	0	0	0	0	0	0	0	1	0	1
22	FW	(Greece)	Lazaros Lamprou	1	0	0	0	0	0	0	0	0	0	0	0	1	0	0
68	FW	(Greece)	Christos Tzolis	2	0	0	0	0	0	0	0	0	0	0	0	2	0	0
2	DF	(Brazil)	Rodrigo Soares	1	0	0	0	0	0	0	0	0	0	0	0	1	0	0
6	DF	(Albania)	Enea Mihaj	1	0	0	0	0	0	0	0	0	0	0	0	1	0	0

== Awards ==
=== Fans' Man of the Match award ===
As has been voted by PAOK fans on official PAOK website and mobile app.

Rank	Player	League	Cup	CL	EL	Total
1						
Total		0	0	0	0	0

=== Player of the Month award ===
Awarded monthly to the player that was chosen by fans voting on paokfc.gr

Month	Player	Source
August	Giannoulis	
September	Mišić	
October	Mišić	
November	Ingason	
December	Ingason	
January	Mišić	
February	Mišić	
March	–	
April	–	
May	–	
June	Esiti	
July	Michailidis	

=== Season MVP award ===
Mišić	inpaok.com

=== Best Goal of the season award ===
Player	Date	Venue	Opponent	Score	Result
Douglas Augusto	15 February 2020	AEL FC Arena	AEL	0–2	1–2
