= Josip Mišić (footballer, born 1994) =

Croatian footballer

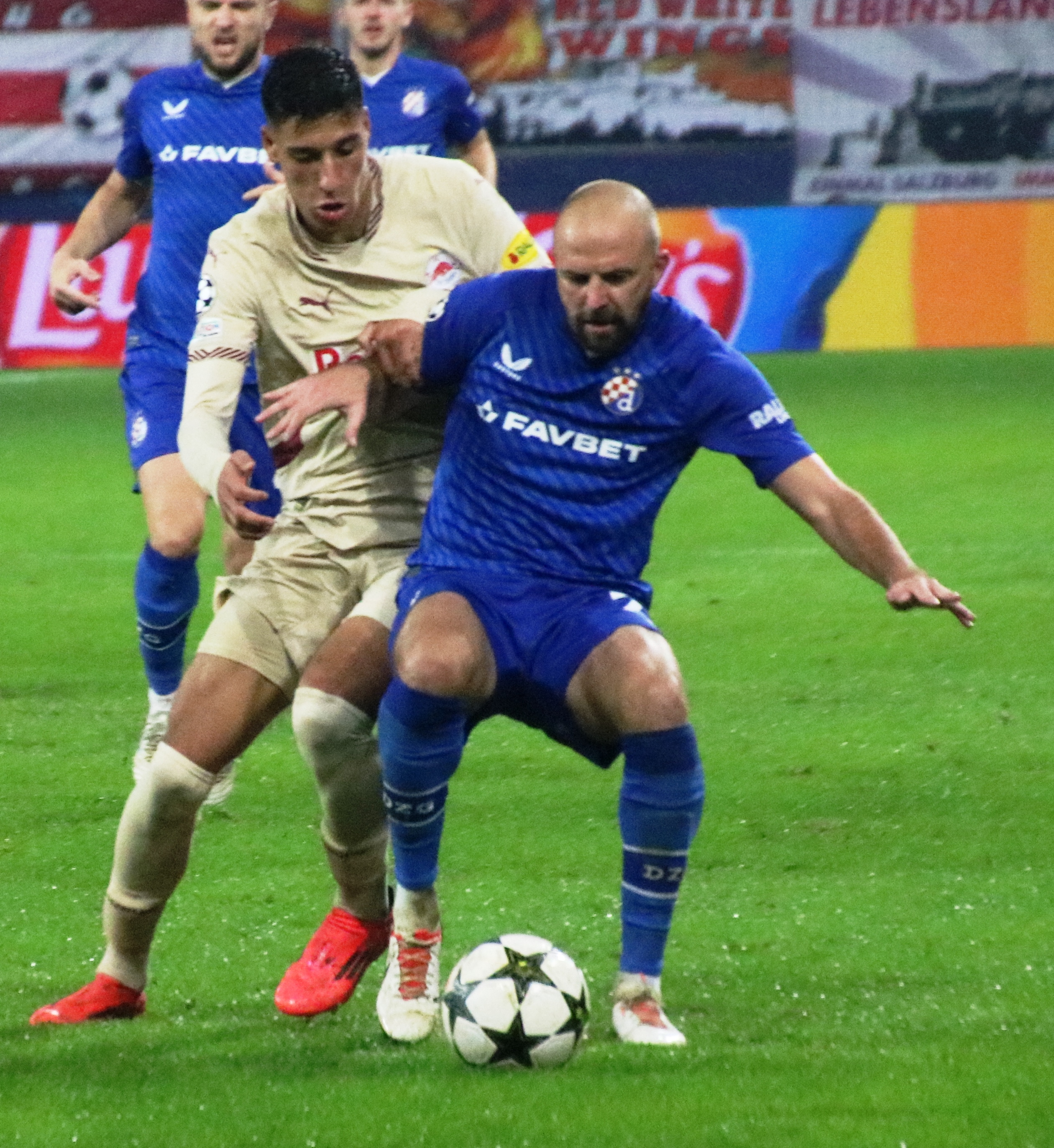
- Mišić in 2024 with Dinamo Zagreb

Personal information
- Date of birth: 28 June 1994 (age 32)
- Place of birth: Vinkovci, Croatia
- Height: 1.87 m (6 ft 2 in)
- Position: Defensive midfielder

Team information
- Current team: Dinamo Zagreb
- Number: 27

Youth career
- 2002–2005: Zrinski Bošnjaci
- 2005–2013: Osijek

Senior career*
Years	Team	Apps	(Gls)
2012–2015	Osijek	55	(3)
2015–2018	Rijeka	65	(4)
2015–2016	→ Spezia (loan)	8	(0)
2018–2021	Sporting CP	8	(0)
2019–2020	→ PAOK (loan)	31	(5)
2020–2021	→ Dinamo Zagreb (loan)	16	(2)
2021–	Dinamo Zagreb	163	(5)

International career^{‡}
2012	Croatia U18	5	(0)
2012–2013	Croatia U19	7	(0)
2014–2016	Croatia U21	6	(0)
2017–	Croatia	5	(0)
- * Club domestic league appearances and goals as of 27 October 2026 ‡ National team caps and goals as of 12 November 2026

Josip Mišić (Croatian pronunciation: [jǒsip mǐːʃitɕ]; born 28 June 1994) is a Croatian professional footballer who plays as a defensive midfielder for Dinamo Zagreb and the Croatia national team.

== Club career ==
Rising through the ranks of the NK Osijek academy, Mišić made his senior team debut in the UEFA Europa League qualifiers 3–1 home win against FC Santa Coloma, coming in for Zoran Kvržić. Not long afterwards, he made his Prva HNL debut as well, coming in the 14th minute of the 3–0 away win against NK Inter Zaprešić for the injured Domagoj Pušić, scoring his first senior goal on the same match, in the 82nd minute.

In December 2014, despite rumours linking him with Dinamo Zagreb, he signed a 4 1/2-year contract with HNK Rijeka. Following three successful years with Rijeka, in January 2018 Mišić moved to Sporting CP on a 5 1/2-year deal, with the transfer valued at €3 million.

On 15 May 2018, Mišić and several of his teammates, including coaches, were injured following an attack by around 50 supporters of Sporting at the club's training ground after the team finished third in the league and missed out on the UEFA Champions League qualification. Despite the attack, he and the rest of the team agreed to play in the Portuguese Cup final scheduled for the following weekend, eventually losing to C.D. Aves.

On 17 January 2019, PAOK announced the signing of Mišić on loan from Sporting Lisbon until June 2020 with a buy-out option. On 22 March 2020, after a remarkable season (the Croatian midfielder has provided an impressive total of eight assists, also scoring five goals including a last-gasp equaliser against arch-rivals Aris) and despite reports on the contrary in Portugal's press, it is clear that PAOK's agreement with Josip Mišić will take place in the next months and the Croatian will sign a yearly contract with the Greek club. PAOK decided to trigger his optional buy-out clause of €2 million.

== International career ==
He made his debut for Croatia in a January 2017 China Cup match against Chile and his second and final international was three days later in the same tournament against the host nation.

On 31 October 2022, Mišić was named in the preliminary 34-man squad for the 2022 FIFA World Cup, but did not make the final 26.

== Career statistics ==
=== Club ===
As of 27 October 2026

Club	Season	League			National Cup		Continental		Other		Total	
Club	Season	Division	Apps	Goals	Apps	Goals	Apps	Goals	Apps	Goals	Apps	Goals
Osijek	2012–13	Prva HNL	11	1	1	0	3 (Note: Appearance(s) in UEFA Europa League)	0	–		15	1
Osijek	2013–14	Prva HNL	28	1	4	0	–		–		32	1
Osijek	2014–15	Prva HNL	16	1	1	0	–		–		17	1
Osijek	Total		55	3	6	0	3	0	0	0	64	3
Rijeka	2014–15	Prva HNL	11	0	4	0	–		–		15	0
Rijeka	2015–16	Prva HNL	1	0	–		–		–		1	0
Rijeka	2016–17	Prva HNL	34	2	6	0	2	0	–		42	2
Rijeka	2017–18	Prva HNL	19	2	3	0	10 (Note: Six appearances in UEFA Champions League, four appearances in UEFA Europa League)	1	–		32	3
Rijeka	Total		65	4	13	0	12	1	0	0	90	5
Spezia (loan)	2015–16	Serie B	8	0	1	0	–		–		9	0
Sporting	2017–18	Primeira Liga	5	0	1	0	–		–		6	0
Sporting	2018–19	Primeira Liga	3	0	0	0	–		–		3	0
Sporting	Total		8	0	1	0	0	0	0	0	9	0
PAOK (loan)	2018–19	Super League Greece	5	0	5	1	0	0	–		10	1
PAOK (loan)	2019–20	Super League Greece	26	5	4	1	2 (Note: One appearance in UEFA Champions League, one appearance in UEFA Europa League)	0	–		32	6
PAOK (loan)	Total		31	5	9	2	2	0	0	0	42	7
Dinamo Zagreb (loan)	2020–21	Prva HNL	16	2	2	1	4	0	–		22	3
Dinamo Zagreb	2021–22	Prva HNL	33	1	2	0	15 (Note: Eight appearances in UEFA Champions League, seven appearances in UEFA Europa League)	0	–		50	1
Dinamo Zagreb	2022–23	Prva HNL	34	2	4	0	11 (Note: Appearance(s) in UEFA Champions League)	0	1 (Note: Appearance in Croatian Football Super Cup)	0	50	2
Dinamo Zagreb	2023–24	Prva HNL	32	0	3	0	16 (Note: Four appearances in UEFA Champions League, two appearances in UEFA Europa League, ten appearances in UEFA Conference League)	0	1	0	52	0
Dinamo Zagreb	2024–25	Prva HNL	25	0	2	0	8	0	—		35	0
Dinamo Zagreb	2025–26	Prva HNL	31	2	3	0	10	0	—		44	2
Dinamo Zagreb	2026–27	Prva HNL	8	0	0	0	9 (Note: Six appearances and one goal in UEFA Champions League, three appearances in UEFA Europa League)	1	—		17	1
Dinamo Zagreb	Total		163	5	14	0	59	1	2	0	238	6
Career total			345	19	45	3	90	2	2	0	481	24

=== International ===
As of match played 12 November 2026

Appearances and goals by national team and year
National team	Year	Apps	Goals
Croatia	2017	2	0
Croatia	2018	0	0
Croatia	2019	0	0
Croatia	2020	0	0
Croatia	2021	0	0
Croatia	2022	0	0
Croatia	2023	0	0
Croatia	2024	0	0
Croatia	2025	0	0
Croatia	2026	3	0
Total		5	0

== Honours ==
HNK Rijeka

- Prva HNL: 2016–17
- Croatian Cup: 2016–17

Sporting CP

- Taça de Portugal: 2018–19

PAOK

- Super League Greece: 2018–19
- Greek Cup: 2018–19

Dinamo Zagreb

- Prva HNL: 2020–21, 2021–22, 2022–23, 2023–24, 2025–26
- Croatian Cup: 2020–21, 2023–24, 2025–26

=== Individual ===
- Croatian First Football League top assist provider: 2013–14
- Croatian First Football League Team of the Year: 2016–17, 2022–23, 2023–24
- Super League Greece PAOK Player of the Year: 2019–20
- Super League Greece Team of the Season: 2019–20
