= Léo Jabá =

Brazilian footballer

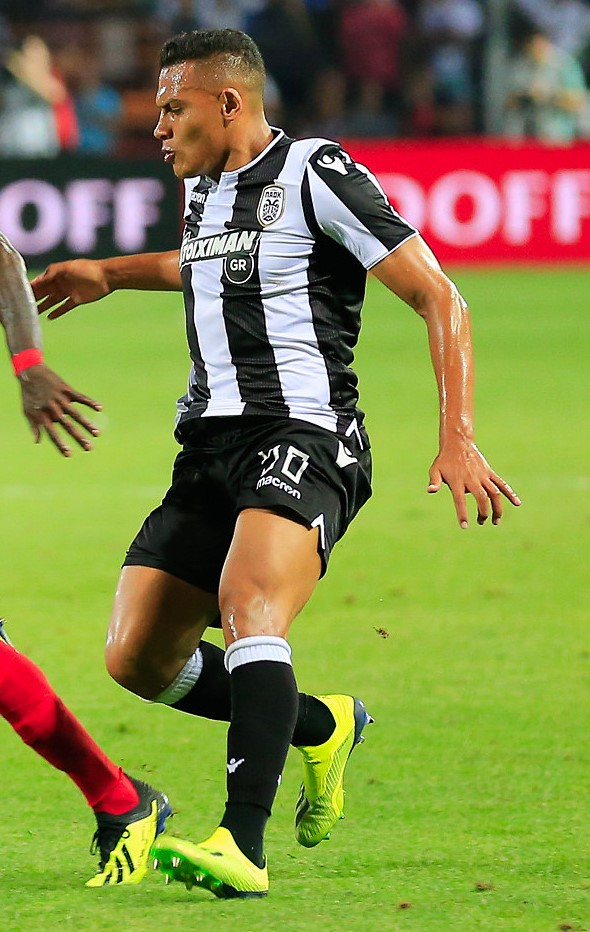
- Léo Jabá with PAOK in 2018

Personal information
- Full name: Leonardo Rodrigues Lima
- Date of birth: 2 August 1998 (age 28)
- Place of birth: São Paulo, Brazil
- Height: 1.78 m (5 ft 10 in)
- Position: Forward

Team information
- Current team: São Bernardo
- Number: 98

Youth career
- 2009–2016: Corinthians

Senior career*
Years	Team	Apps	(Gls)
2016–2017	Corinthians	16	(1)
2017–2018	Akhmat	24	(3)
2018–2022	PAOK	43	(5)
2021	→ Vasco da Gama (loan)	33	(3)
2023	São Bernardo	15	(5)
2023–2024	→ Estrela da Amadora (loan)	31	(5)
2025–	São Bernardo	17	(4)

International career^{‡}
2016–2017	Brazil U20	16	(3)
- * Club domestic league appearances and goals as of 18 November 2026 ‡ National team caps and goals as of 11 February 2017

Leonardo Rodrigues Lima (born 2 August 1998), known as Léo Jabá, is a Brazilian professional footballer who plays as a forward for São Bernardo.

== Club career ==
=== Corinthians ===
Born in São Paulo, Léo Jabá joined Corinthians' youth setup at the age of 11. He made his unofficial first team debut in a friendly on 22 July 2015, as he entered in the second half of Corinthians' 1–0 victory against ABC in Natal.

Léo Jabá was a part of the under-20 team which finished second in both the 2016 Copa São Paulo de Futebol Júnior and the 2016 Campeonato Brasileiro Sub-20, before being definitely promoted to the main squad in September of that year. He made his professional debut on 21 November, coming on as a late substitute for Marlone in a 1–0 home win over Internacional.

Léo Jabá scored his first professional goal on 29 March 2017, netting the opener in a 3–1 Campeonato Paulista home win over Linense.

=== Akhmat Grozny ===
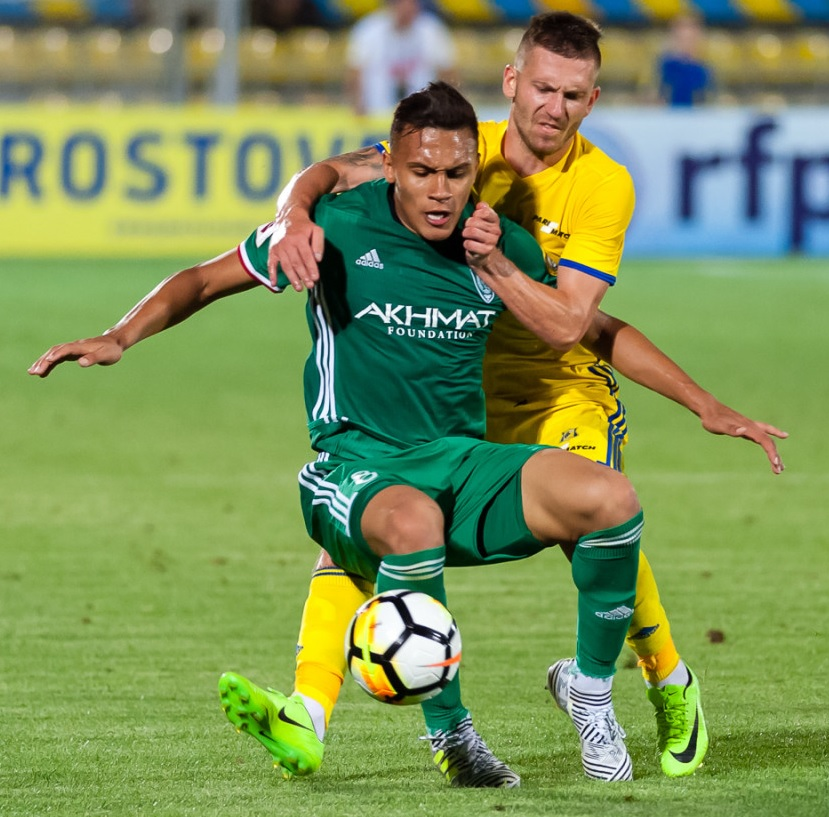
Léo Jabá (in green) with Akhmat Grozny in 2017

On 4 July 2017, Léo Jabá joined Akhmat Grozny of the Russian Premier League, for a rumoured fee of €2 million. He made his debut abroad twelve days later, starting and scoring the winner in a 1–0 home success over Amkar Perm.

Initially a first-choice, Léo Jabá lost his starting spot in April 2018, and finished the season with three goals in 25 appearances overall.

=== PAOK ===
On 20 June 2018, PAOK signed Léo Jabá on a five-year deal, for a €3.5 million fee. He made his debut for his new side on 24 July, starting in a 2–1 home win over FC Basel, for the campaign's UEFA Champions League.

On 15 September 2018, Léo Jabá scored his first goal of the 2018–19 Super League season, netting his team's third in a 3–1 away win against OFI. On 4 October, he scored a brace and provided two assists in a 4–1 away routing of BATE Borisov in the UEFA Europa League group stage.

On 3 March 2019, Léo Jabá scored a crucial goal, despite his red card in the second half, sealing a 2–0 away win against rivals Panathinaikos in his club's effort to win the title undefeated. Amidst interest from Porto, Newcastle United and Anderlecht, he finished the season with seven goals in 39 appearances in all competitions.

In May 2020, after losing space under manager Abel Ferreira, Léo Jabá suffered a knee injury, missing out the remainder of the season.

==== Loan to Vasco da Gama ====
On 25 March 2021, Jabá was loaned to Vasco da Gama until December. He was regularly used by the club during the year, but did not sign a permanent deal as the club announced his departure on 2 December.

==== 2022: return from loan ====
On 12 January 2022, Léo Jabá returned to action for PAOK after 488, scoring his team's second a 2–0 home win game against Panetolikos and knocking down manager Răzvan Lucescu in his celebration. He played a further eleven matches during the remainder of the 2021–22 season, scoring another goal against Lamia on 6 March.

=== São Bernardo ===
On 8 December 2022, Léo Jabá returned to his home country and was announced as the new signing for Série C side São Bernardo. He scored three goals in ten appearances during the 2023 Campeonato Paulista, as the club lifted the Taça Independência, given to the eliminated sides of the countryside.

He was handed a ban, during a positive drugtest. In September 2026 was he suspended for the second time.

== Personal life ==
Léo Jabá's younger brother Leandro was also a footballer and a forward. He played for several youth teams before moving to FK Pardubice in 2022.

== Career statistics ==
As of 30 March 2023

Club	Season	League			State League		Cup		Continental		Other		Total	
Club	Season	Division	Apps	Goals	Apps	Goals	Apps	Goals	Apps	Goals	Apps	Goals	Apps	Goals
Corinthians	2016	Série A	2	0	—		—		—		—		2	0
Corinthians	2017	Série A	1	0	13 (Note: Appearance(s) in Campeonato Paulista)	1	0	0	0	0	—		14	1
Corinthians	Total		3	0	13	1	0	0	0	0	—		16	1
Akhmat Grozny	2017–18	Russian Premier League	24	3	—		1	0	—		—		25	3
PAOK	2018–19	Super League Greece	24	3	—		6	2	9 (Note: Four appearances in UEFA Champions League, five appearances and two goals in UEFA Europa League)	2	—		39	7
PAOK	2019–20	Super League Greece	6	0	—		0	0	3 (Note: Two appearances in UEFA Champions League, one appearance in UEFA Europa League)	0	—		9	0
PAOK	2020–21	Super League Greece	1	0	—		0	0	1 (Note: Appearance(s) in UEFA Champions League)	0	—		2	0
PAOK	2021–22	Super League Greece	9	2	—		1	0	0	0	—		10	2
PAOK	Total		40	5	—		7	2	13	2	—		60	9
Vasco da Gama (loan)	2021	Série B	27	3	6 (Note: Appearance(s) in Campeonato Carioca)	0	5	0	—		—		38	3
São Bernardo	2023	Série C	0	0	10	3	0	0	—		—		10	3
Career total			94	11	29	4	13	2	13	2	0	0	149	19

== Honours ==
Corinthians

- Campeonato Paulista: 2017

PAOK

- Super League Greece: 2018–19
- Greek Cup: 2018–19
