= José Ángel Crespo =

Spanish footballer (born 1987)

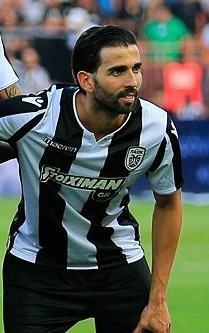
- Crespo with PAOK in 2018

Personal information
- Full name: José Ángel Crespo Rincón
- Date of birth: 9 February 1987 (age 39)
- Place of birth: Lora del Río, Spain
- Height: 1.83 m (6 ft 0 in)
- Position: Defender

Youth career
- 2003–2005: Sevilla

Senior career*
Years	Team	Apps	(Gls)
2005–2007	Sevilla B	73	(3)
2005–2010	Sevilla	25	(0)
2009–2010	→ Racing Santander (loan)	13	(0)
2010–2011	Padova	43	(1)
2011–2015	Bologna	17	(1)
2012–2013	→ Verona (loan)	14	(0)
2014–2015	→ Córdoba (loan)	27	(0)
2015–2016	Aston Villa	1	(0)
2016	→ Rayo Vallecano (loan)	9	(0)
2016–2022	PAOK	134	(7)
2022–2024	APOEL	46	(3)
Total		402	(15)

International career
2006	Spain U19	6	(0)
2007	Spain U20	5	(0)
2007–2008	Spain U21	4	(0)
- * Club domestic league appearances and goals

José Ángel Crespo Rincón (born 9 February 1987) is a Spanish former professional footballer. Mainly a central defender, he could also play as a full-back.

He made 74 La Liga appearances for Sevilla, Racing de Santander, Córdoba and Rayo Vallecano, and also had brief spells in Serie A with Bologna and the Premier League with Aston Villa. He won a Super League and four cups with Greece's PAOK.

== Club career ==
=== Sevilla ===
Crespo was born in Lora del Río, Andalusia. A product of Sevilla FC's youth system, he made his first-team debut on 14 December 2005 in the group stage of the UEFA Cup, playing the full 90 minutes of a 1–1 draw at Bolton Wanderers; this was his only appearance of their victorious campaign. He made his La Liga bow a week later in a 1–0 away defeat against Getafe CF, appearing in two more games during the season while still registered with the reserves.

In the 2007–08 campaign, with Antonio Puerta's (who played mostly as left-back) death, Crespo was definitely promoted to the main squad. In December 2008, Aston Villa reportedly showed interest in signing him after several good performances under coach Manolo Jiménez, also his coach at Sevilla Atlético.

On 3 July 2009, Crespo was loaned to fellow top-division club Racing de Santander in a season-long move. After appearing sparingly during his stint, with the Cantabrians narrowly avoiding relegation, he was released by Sevilla and joined Calcio Padova in Italy.

=== Bologna ===
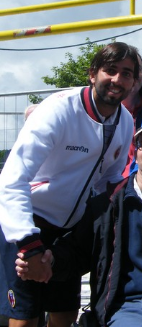
Crespo with Bologna in 2011

Crespo moved to Bologna FC 1909 on 14 July 2011, alongside Padova teammates Federico Agliardi and Daniele Vantaggiato. Having been rarely played, he was loaned to Hellas Verona FC and Córdoba CF, signing a two-year permanent contract with the latter on 27 April 2015, with the deal being made effective in July.

During his spell with the Stadio Renato Dall'Ara-based side, Crespo made his debut in Serie A on 21 December 2011, playing the entire 0–2 home loss against AS Roma. He scored his only goal in the competition on 27 October 2013, to help the hosts defeat AS Livorno Calcio 1–0.

=== Aston Villa ===
On 27 July 2015, Aston Villa completed the signing of Crespo from Córdoba on a three-year deal for an undisclosed fee. He made his only appearance in the Premier League on 3 October, starting in a 0–1 home defeat to Stoke City.

Having made only one more appearance in the Football League Cup, Crespo joined Rayo Vallecano on 20 January 2016, on a six-month loan.

=== PAOK ===
In early July 2016, Crespo signed a three-year contract with PAOK FC, for a nominal fee. In one of his first games on 18 August, he scored in a 3–0 win at FC Dinamo Tbilisi to make the Europa League group stage. His first season in Thessaloniki ended with cup conquest, as a 2–1 victory over AEK Athens F.C. ended 14 years of drought.

Crespo scored his first goal in the Super League Greece on 2 December 2017, in a 3–0 away win against Xanthi FC. The following campaign, PAOK won the double to end 35 years without a league title. A fourth cup conquest in 2021 made him the most successful player in the club's history.

== Career statistics ==
Appearances and goals by club, season and competition
Club	Season	League			National cup (Note: Includes Copa del Rey, Coppa Italia, Greek Football Cup, Cypriot Cup)		League cup (Note: Includes EFL Cup)		Continental		Other		Total	
Club	Season	Division	Apps	Goals	Apps	Goals	Apps	Goals	Apps	Goals	Apps	Goals	Apps	Goals
Sevilla B	2005–06	Segunda División B	32	2	—		—		—		3 (Note: Appearances in Segunda División B promotion play-offs)	0	35	2
Sevilla B	2006–07	Segunda División B	34	1	—		—		—		4	0	38	1
Sevilla B	2007–08	Segunda División	7	0	—		—		—		—		7	0
Sevilla B	Total		73	3	—		—		—		7	0	80	3
Sevilla	2005–06	La Liga	3	0	0	0	—		1 (Note: Appearances in UEFA Cup)	0	—		4	0
Sevilla	2007–08	La Liga	13	0	1	0	—		1 (Note: Appearances in UEFA Champions League)	0	—		15	0
Sevilla	2008–09	La Liga	9	0	3	0	—		2	0	—		14	0
Sevilla	Total		25	0	4	0	—		4	0	—		33	0
Racing Santander (loan)	2009–10	La Liga	13	0	3	0	—		—		—		16	0
Padova	2010–11	Serie B	43	1	0	0	—		—		—		43	1
Bologna	2011–12	Serie A	7	0	2	0	—		—		—		9	0
Bologna	2013–14	Serie A	10	1	1	0	—		—		—		11	1
Bologna	Total		17	1	3	0	—		—		—		20	1
Hellas Verona (loan)	2012–13	Serie B	14	0	3	0	—		—		—		17	0
Córdoba (loan)	2014–15	La Liga	27	0	2	0	—		—		—		29	0
Aston Villa	2015–16	Premier League	1	0	0	0	1	0	—		—		2	0
Rayo Vallecano (loan)	2015–16	La Liga	9	0	0	0	—		—		—		9	0
PAOK	2016–17	Super League Greece	31	0	7	0	—		9 (Note: Appearances in UEFA Europa League)	1	—		47	1
PAOK	2017–18	Super League Greece	24	2	5	0	—		4	0	—		33	2
PAOK	2018–19	Super League Greece	30	1	8	0	—		11	0	—		49	1
PAOK	2019–20	Super League Greece	16	2	0	0	—		4	0	—		20	2
PAOK	2020–21	Super League Greece	21	1	5	0	—		8	0	–		34	1
PAOK	2021–22	Super League Greece	12	1	4	0	—		12 (Note: Appearances in UEFA Europa Conference League)	1	–		28	2
PAOK	Total		134	7	29	0	—		48	2	—		211	9
APOEL	2022–23	Cypriot First Division	33	2	4	0	—		5	0	—		42	2
APOEL	2023–24	Cypriot First Division	13	1	0	0	—		3	1	—		16	2
APOEL	Total		46	3	4	0	—		8	1	0	0	58	4
Career total			402	15	48	0	1	0	60	2	7	0	518	15

== Honours ==
Sevilla B

- Segunda División B: 2006–07

Sevilla

- UEFA Cup: 2005–06

PAOK

- Super League Greece: 2018–19
- Greek Football Cup: 2016–17, 2017–18, 2018–19, 2020–21

APOEL

- Cypriot First Division: 2023–24

Spain U19

- UEFA European Under-19 Championship: 2006
