= Dimitris Giannoulis =

Greek footballer

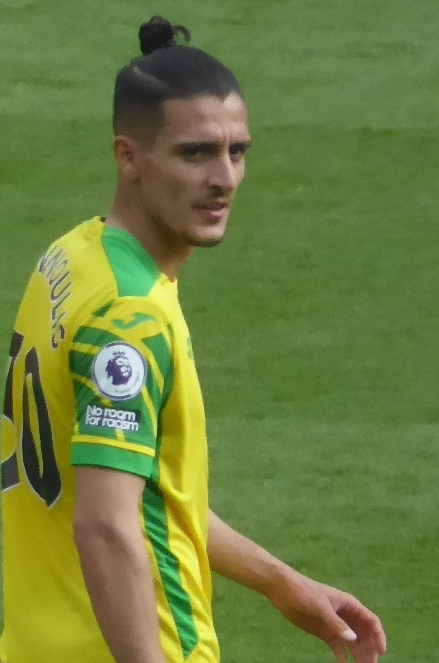
- Giannoulis playing for Norwich City in 2022

Personal information
- Full name: Dimitrios Christos Giannoulis
- Date of birth: 17 October 1995 (age 31)
- Place of birth: Katerini, Greece
- Height: 1.78 m (5 ft 10 in)
- Positions: Left back; left wing-back

Team information
- Current team: PAOK
- Number: 13

Youth career
- 2009–2012: Vataniakos

Senior career*
Years	Team	Apps	(Gls)
2012–2014	Vataniakos	33	(3)
2014–2021	PAOK	54	(1)
2014–2015	→ Pierikos (loan)	26	(0)
2015–2016	→ Veria (loan)	24	(0)
2017	→ Anorthosis (loan)	8	(0)
2017–2019	→ Atromitos (loan)	42	(0)
2021	→ Norwich City (loan)	16	(0)
2021–2024	Norwich City	77	(0)
2024–2026	FC Augsburg	58	(3)
2026–	PAOK	1	(0)

International career^{‡}
2015–2016	Greece U21	5	(0)
2018–	Greece	34	(0)
- * Club domestic league appearances and goals as of 6 September 2026 ‡ National team caps and goals as of 27 March 2026

Dimitris Giannoulis (Greek: Δημήτρης Γιαννούλης; born 17 October 1995) is a Greek professional footballer who plays as a left-back for Super League Greece club PAOK and the Greece national team.

Giannoulis began his senior career with Vataniakos and joined Norwich City in 2021, initially while on loan from PAOK. After spending three seasons with Norwich, he joined FC Augsburg.

== Club career ==
=== Vataniakos ===
Starting his youth career at Vataniakos, the left-back graduated to the side's first-team in 2012, making 33 appearances for the Katerini-based team before signing for PAOK.

=== PAOK ===
Giannoulis joined Super League club PAOK in 2014. In his time with PAOK since 2014, Giannoulis has made 74 appearances for the Super League, scoring twice and creating ten assists, even picking up a league title and Greek Cup winners' medal in 2019.

==== Loan moves ====
He spent time on loan at Football League club, Pierikos and then at Veria, where his performances earned him the Nova Sports 2015–16 Super League Rookie of the Year award. He then extended his contract with PAOK until 2020. Further loan spells followed, first at Cypriot club Anorthosis, and then back in the Super League with Atromitos, where he was a regular for 18 months.

==== Return to PAOK ====
In December 2018, PAOK turned down a €2.2 million offer from French Ligue 1 club Rennes, and recalled Giannoulis from loan. He finally made his league debut for PAOK on 10 February 2019 as a second-half substitute against Olympiacos, and made eight appearances in what remained of their 2018–19 season.

Giannoulis scored after 87 minutes of PAOK's 2019–20 Europa League play-off second leg to give his side a 3–2 win on the night, but opponents Slovan Bratislava progressed on away goals after the scores finished 3–3 on aggregate.

=== Norwich City ===
In January 2021, Giannoulis was loaned to EFL Championship side Norwich City for the remainder of the season. He was signed after the loan of Xavi Quintillà from Villarreal had been disrupted by injury problems, forcing midfielder Jacob Sørensen into a length stint as cover. The deal included an obligation for Norwich to buy him if they are promoted to the Premier League. Giannoulis was then left out of the 2–0 loss at Swansea City but started to find his rhythm and show his ability during the 4–1 win over Stoke City and the 2–0 victory over Coventry City. Giannoulis gradually became a more prominent Norwich player with his performances during the season, getting forward well from his left-back position to help set up several goals as well as defending resolutely. The end of his 2020–21 campaign was disrupted by a red card bringing a three-game ban, on the day that promotion had been sealed.

On 17 April 2021, following the club's confirmed promotion to the Premier League, Norwich exercised their obligation to sign Giannoulis on a permanent basis, paying his former club PAOK a fee of €7.5 million. On 11 December, despite the home loss against Manchester United, Giannoulis was voted Man of the Match for his performance.

=== Augsburg ===
On 23 July 2024, Giannoulis signed a four-year contract with FC Augsburg in Germany. He scored his first goal for the club in a 3–1 defeat against Bayern Munich on 4 April 2025.

=== Return to PAOK ===
On 6 August 2026, Giannoulis returned to Greece to rejoin PAOK, signing a three-year contract.

== International career ==
On 15 May 2018, Giannoulis was one of nine players to make their debut for the Greece national team in a 2–0 friendly loss against Saudi Arabia. He was sent off after 43 minutes of the match.

== Personal life ==
Giannoulis' older brother, Kostas, is a retired professional footballer.

== Career statistics ==
=== Club ===
As of match played 9 May 2026

Appearances and goals by club, season and competition
Club	Season	League			National cup		Continental		Other		Total	
Club	Season	Division	Apps	Goals	Apps	Goals	Apps	Goals	Apps	Goals	Apps	Goals
Vataniakos	2012–13	Gamma Ethniki	14	1	0	0	—		—		14	1
Vataniakos	2013–14	Football League Greece	19	2	1	0	—		—		20	2
Vataniakos	Total		33	3	1	0	—		—		34	3
PAOK	2016–17	Super League Greece	0	0	2	0	—		—		2	0
PAOK	2018–19	Super League Greece	8	0	4	0	—		—		12	0
PAOK	2019–20	Super League Greece	34	0	6	0	4 (Note: Two appearances in UEFA Champions League, two appearances and one goal in UEFA Europa League)	1	—		44	1
PAOK	2020–21	Super League Greece	12	0	0	0	8 (Note: Four appearances and one goal in UEFA Champions League, four appearances in UEFA Europa League)	1	—		20	1
PAOK	Total		54	0	12	0	12	2	—		78	2
Pierikos (loan)	2014–15	Football League Greece	26	0	2	0	—		—		28	0
Veria (loan)	2015–16	Super League Greece	24	0	2	0	—		—		26	0
Anorthosis (loan)	2016–17	Cypriot First Division	8	0	1	0	—		—		9	0
Atromitos (loan)	2017–18	Super League Greece	27	0	5	0	—		—		32	0
Atromitos (loan)	2018–19	Super League Greece	15	0	4	0	2 (Note: Appearances in UEFA Europa League)	0	—		21	0
Atromitos (loan)	Total		42	0	9	0	2	0	—		53	0
Norwich City (loan)	2020–21	Championship	16	0	0	0	—		0	0	16	0
Norwich City	2021–22	Premier League	18	0	2	0	—		2 (Note: Appearances in EFL Cup)	0	20	0
Norwich City	2022–23	Championship	26	0	1	0	—		0	0	27	0
Norwich City	2023–24	Championship	33	0	2	0	—		3 (Note: One appearance in EFL Cup, two appearances in Championship play-offs)	0	38	0
Norwich City	Norwich total		93	0	5	0	—		5	0	103	0
FC Augsburg	2024–25	Bundesliga	31	1	3	0	—		—		34	1
FC Augsburg	2025–26	Bundesliga	27	2	2	0	—		—		29	2
FC Augsburg	Total		58	3	5	0	—		—		63	3
Career total			338	6	37	0	14	2	5	0	394	8

=== International ===
As of match played 27 March 2026

Appearances and goals by national team and year
National team	Year	Apps	Goals
Greece	2018	2	0
Greece	2019	5	0
Greece	2020	4	0
Greece	2021	7	0
Greece	2022	3	0
Greece	2023	5	0
Greece	2024	5	0
Greece	2025	2	0
Greece	2026	1	0
Total		34	0

== Honours ==
PAOK

- Super League Greece: 2018–19
- Greek Cup: 2018–19

Norwich City

- EFL Championship: 2020–21

Individual

- Super League Greece Team of the Season: 2017–18
