= Panetolikos Stadium =

Multi-purpose stadium in Agrinio, Greece

Coordinates: 38°37′48″N 21°24′42″E

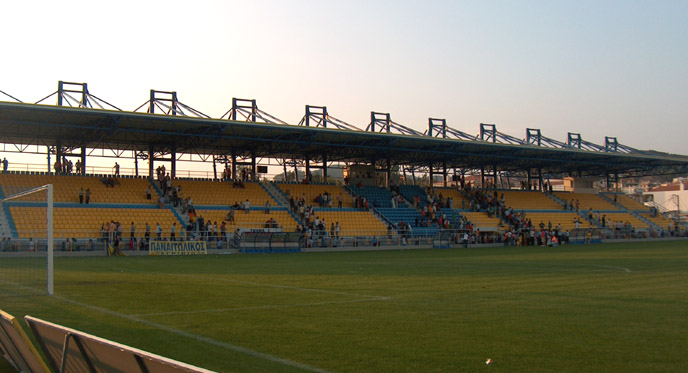
- Interactive map of Panetolikos Stadium
- Full name: Panetolikos Stadium
- Location: Agrinio, Greece
- Owner: Panetolikos
- Capacity: 7,321
- Scoreboard: Yes

Construction
- Built: 1930
- Renovated: 2005, 2024–2026

Tenant
- Panetolikos F.C.

Panetolikos Stadium (Greek: Γήπεδο Παναιτωλικού/ English: Gipedo Panetolikou) is a multi-use stadium in the city of Agrinio, Aetolia-Acarnania, Greece.

It is mostly used for football matches and is the home stadium of Panetolikos FC which competes in the Super League Greece. The stadium is located in the area of Klepaìtika within Prousiotìssis, Vlahernòn, Nikitarà and Vlohoù streets and its current capacity is 7,321 all-seated. Its highest attendance recorded was 11,012 spectators during a match against Olympiakos in 1977.

There are plans to increase the seating capacity of the stadium to 11,000 in the future. The stadium’s small eastern stand was fully renovated and its upper section expanded via a 2.3 million euro project. A roof was also added in 2026, making all seats in the stadium fully covered.

Nowadays the average attendance is 5,000. Even though Agrinio is a small city, Panetolikos supporters known as "The Warriors" are well known for their loyalty for the team. They show their support from Gate 6 of the stadium.

== History ==
The stadium has a total of three stands (east, west, south). It has been used as a football ground since 1930, however the first stand (the small east one that was recently covered, expanded and renovated) was not constructed until the mid-'50s. The main west stand was built in the 1970s. Unfortunately, in the years that followed, little else happened to the stadium, which gradually fell into disrepair.

This was the situation until 2005 when the new owners acquired the club and revealed their plans for the complete reconstruction of the stadium. The stadium features team offices, the club’s official store (boutique) and cafes.

Since the club’s promotion to the Super League, a large southern stand (Curva) was constructed adjacent to Prousiotìssis street that increased the stadium’s overall capacity by 1400

Recently the addition of an extra lighting system was complete, with the overall power of lights at 1600 lux, which fully satisfy the Super League and UEFA requirements. Additionally a scoreboard was added in 2017.

The stadium is widely considered as one of the most modern and functional stadiums in the Super League.
