= Karol Świderski =

Polish footballer (born 1997)

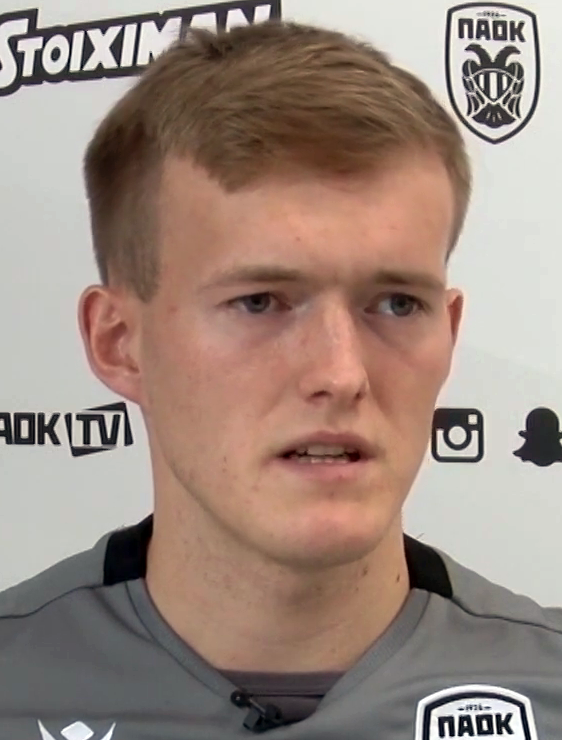
- Świderski with PAOK in 2019

Personal information
- Full name: Karol Grzegorz Świderski
- Date of birth: 23 January 1997 (age 29)
- Place of birth: Rawicz, Poland
- Height: 1.84 m (6 ft 0 in)
- Position: Striker

Team information
- Current team: Widzew Łódź
- Number: 28

Youth career
- 2010–2012: Rawia Rawicz
- 2012–2014: UKS SMS Łódź

Senior career*
Years	Team	Apps	(Gls)
2014–2019	Jagiellonia Białystok	113	(20)
2019–2022	PAOK	96	(30)
2022–2025	Charlotte FC	71	(28)
2024	→ Hellas Verona (loan)	15	(2)
2025–2026	Panathinaikos	36	(8)
2026–	Widzew Łódź	14	(5)

International career^{‡}
2014–2015	Poland U18	5	(5)
2015	Poland U19	7	(5)
2016	Poland U20	3	(0)
2017–2019	Poland U21	11	(0)
2021–	Poland	56	(14)
- * Club domestic league appearances and goals as of 13:22, 8 November 2026 (UTC) ‡ National team caps and goals as of 23:55, 14 November 2026 (UTC)

Karol Grzegorz Świderski (born 23 January 1997) is a Polish professional footballer who plays as a striker for Ekstraklasa club Widzew Łódź and the Poland national team.

== Club career ==
=== Jagiellonia Białystok ===
Świderski began his career in the youth academy of Rawia Rawicz. From 2012 to 2014, he was in the sports school of UKS SMS Łódź. Then, in 2014, he went on to play for Ekstraklasa side Jagiellonia Białystok, playing at first in their III Liga team and their youth academy. He eventually started playing exclusively in their first team in the 2016–17 season.

Świderski was only 17 when he made his debut in the Ekstraklasa for Jagiellonia on 23 August 2014, in a 3–1 loss against Śląsk Wrocław. On 3 June 2015, in an away match, he scored his first professional goal against Pogoń Szczecin in the 80th minute, in a 3–1 win.

Świderski's UEFA debut came on 2 July 2015, where he scored and won the game for Jagiellonia in a 1–0 win against Kruoja Pakruojis. He also played in the reverse leg, which Jagiellonia won 8–0 and scored in the 4th minute.

=== PAOK ===
On 20 January 2019, PAOK FC confirmed the signing of Świderski, penning a 3.5-year contract with the Polish forward on a €2 million transfer fee. He debuted for the club on 27 January 2019, being subbed in the 81st minute for Omar El Kaddouri. On 30 January 2019, Świderski's first goal came in the 87th minute, after coming off the bench for Dimitrios Limnios.

On 18 February 2019, Świderski scored as a substitute in a 5–1 away win against Apollon Smyrnis. On 10 March 2019, he scored in a 3–0 home win against Atromitos. On 21 April 2019, he scored the final goal in a 5–0 defeat of Levadiakos that confirmed PAOKs first league title for 34 years.

On 25 August 2019, he scored his first goal of the 2019–20 season with a header, opening the score, in a 2–1 home win game against Panetolikos, and a week later, he scored again in a 2–1 home win against Panionios. On 29 August, he scored after an assist from Rodrigo Soares as PAOK beat ŠK Slovan Bratislava in the second leg of their Europa League play-off tie but were eliminated on away goals after the score finished 3–3 on aggregate. On 29 September 2019, he scored both PAOK's goals in a 2–2 draw city rivals AEK Athens.

On 4 January 2020, the Polish forward gleefully slotted home the rebound after Julián Cuesta clumsily spilled a shot from Dimitrios Pelkas, to open the score in an away 4–2 loss against rivals Aris, as PAOK were finally beaten after 51 games in Super League. On 19 January 2020, Swiderski finished clinically with a low shot on the turn to open the score in a 3–1 home win game against Asteras Tripolis. On 12 February 2020, Świderski received a wonderful pass from Pelkas, and the Polish striker subsequently beat Sokratis Dioudis with a pinpoint attempt, helping reigning Cup winners PAOK breezed through to the semi-finals of the Greek Cup, defeating Panathinaikos 1–0 in Athens to complete a 3–0 aggregate triumph. On 4 October 2020, he scored a brace in the last 3 minutes of the game sealing a triumphiant 3–0 home win against OFI. On 31 January 2021, he scored a brace in a 5–0 home win against Panetolikos.

On 19 January 2022, PAOK accepted MLS club Charlotte FC's €5 million offer for Świderski. Świderski played in 28 matches this season, scoring 4 goals and 3 assists. In his last match with the club, the Polish international striker entered the game as a late substitute, in the derby Greek Football Cup game against AEK Athens.

=== Charlotte FC ===
On 26 January 2022, Charlotte FC announced the signing of Świderski from PAOK to a Designated Player contract through the 2025 season with an option for 2026. The 25-year-old Polish international occupied an international roster slot on the club’s inaugural roster.

==== Loan to Hellas Verona ====
On 1 February 2024, Świderski went back to Europe to join Serie A club Hellas Verona on loan until the end of the year, with an option to make the move permanent. Following the season's end, Świderski returned to Charlotte in early July.

=== Panathinaikos ===
On 23 January 2025, Świderski returned to Greece, signing a three-and-a-half-year deal with Panathinaikos for a reported fee of €2 million.

=== Widzew Łódź ===
On 18 June 2026, Widzew Łódź announced the signing of Świderski on a three-year contract for a fee reported to be €1 million.

== International career ==
=== U-18 ===
Świderski was chosen in March 2015 by the Polish U-18 national team coach Rafał Janas to play in the LFF U-18 Federation Cup. He made his debut in the winner's match against Georgia, which Poland won 1–0. Świderski played again and scored his first goal in the 9th minute against Latvia, where they drew 1–1.

=== U-19 ===
Świderski debuted for the U-19 team on 5 September 2015 in a friendly match against Wales, which ended in a 1–1 draw. He played two more friendly matches against Slovenia, scoring both the goals in the first match, which ended in a 2–2 draw. Świderski was successful in the U-19 European Championship qualifier in Cyprus against Bulgaria, Cyprus and Luxembourg, scoring three goals.

=== Senior ===
On 15 March 2021, Świderski received his first-call up to the Polish senior squad to play for the 2022 FIFA World Cup qualification. He debuted in said tournament against Andorra, coming as a substitute to Robert Lewandowski in the 63rd minute. He also scored his debut goal for his country in the same game in the 88th minute. He was later included in the Polish squads for the UEFA Euro 2020, 2022 FIFA World Cup, and UEFA Euro 2024.

== Career statistics ==
=== Club ===
As of match played 7 November 2026

Appearances and goals by club, season and competition
Club	Season	League			National cup (Note: Includes Polish Cup, Greek Cup, U.S. Open Cup)		Continental		Other		Total	
Club	Season	Division	Apps	Goals	Apps	Goals	Apps	Goals	Apps	Goals	Apps	Goals
Jagiellonia Białystok	2014–15	Ekstraklasa	7	1	0	0	—		—		7	1
Jagiellonia Białystok	2015–16	Ekstraklasa	31	4	1	1	4 (Note: Appearance(s) in UEFA Europa League)	2	—		36	7
Jagiellonia Białystok	2016–17	Ekstraklasa	26	2	2	1	—		—		28	3
Jagiellonia Białystok	2017–18	Ekstraklasa	32	5	1	0	1	0	—		34	5
Jagiellonia Białystok	2018–19	Ekstraklasa	17	8	3	1	3	0	—		23	9
Jagiellonia Białystok	Total		113	20	7	3	8	2	—		128	25
PAOK	2018–19	Super League Greece	11	4	4	2	—		—		15	6
PAOK	2019–20	Super League Greece	34	11	4	2	3 (Note: One appearance in UEFA Champions League, two appearances and one goal in UEFA Europa League)	1	—		41	14
PAOK	2020–21	Super League Greece	35	11	5	0	9 (Note: Three appearances in UEFA Champions League, six appearances in UEFA Europa League)	0	—		49	11
PAOK	2021–22	Super League Greece	16	4	3	0	10 (Note: Appearances in UEFA Europa Conference League)	0	—		29	4
PAOK	Total		96	30	16	4	22	1	—		134	35
Charlotte FC	2022	Major League Soccer	30	10	0	0	—		—		30	10
Charlotte FC	2023	Major League Soccer	31	12	3	1	—		6 (Note: One appearance in MLS Cup playoffs, five appearances and two goals in Leagues Cup)	2	40	15
Charlotte FC	2024	Major League Soccer	10	6	0	0	—		5 (Note: Three appearances and one goal in MLS Cup playoffs, two appearances in Leagues Cup)	1	15	7
Charlotte FC	Total		71	28	3	1	—		11	3	85	32
Hellas Verona (loan)	2023–24	Serie A	15	2	—		—		—		15	2
Panathinaikos	2024–25	Super League Greece	11	3	1	0	4	1	—		16	4
Panathinaikos	2025–26	Super League Greece	25	5	4	0	17 (Note: Two appearances in UEFA Champions League, fifteen appearances and four goals in UEFA Europa League)	4	—		46	9
Panathinaikos	Total		36	8	5	0	21	5	—		62	13
Widzew Łódź	2026–27	Ekstraklasa	14	5	1	0	—		—		15	5
Career total			345	93	32	8	51	8	11	3	439	112

=== International ===
As of match played 14 November 2026

Appearances and goals by national team and year
National team	Year	Apps	Goals
Poland	2021	14	6
Poland	2022	5	2
Poland	2023	9	2
Poland	2024	10	1
Poland	2025	9	2
Poland	2026	9	1
Total		56	14

Scores and results list Poland's goal tally first, score column indicates score after each Świderski goal.

List of international goals scored by Karol Świderski
No.	Date	Venue	Cap	Opponent	Score	Result	Competition
1	28 March 2021	Polish Army Stadium, Warsaw, Poland	1	Andorra	3–0	3–0	2022 FIFA World Cup qualification
2	8 June 2021	Poznań Stadium, Poznań, Poland	4	Iceland	2–2	2–2	Friendly
3	5 September 2021	San Marino Stadium, Serravalle, San Marino	9	San Marino	2–0	7–1	2022 FIFA World Cup qualification
4	9 October 2021	Stadion Narodowy, Warsaw, Poland	11	San Marino	1–0	5–0	2022 FIFA World Cup qualification
5	12 October 2021	Arena Kombëtare, Tirana, Albania	12	Albania	1–0	1–0	2022 FIFA World Cup qualification
6	15 November 2021	Stadion Narodowy, Warsaw, Poland	14	Hungary	1–1	1–2	2022 FIFA World Cup qualification
7	1 June 2022	Wrocław Stadium, Wrocław, Poland	15	Wales	2–1	2–1	2022–23 UEFA Nations League A
8	25 September 2022	Cardiff Stadium, Cardiff, Wales	17	Wales	1–0	1–0	2022–23 UEFA Nations League A
9	27 March 2023	Stadion Narodowy, Warsaw, Poland	21	Albania	1–0	1–0	UEFA Euro 2024 qualifying
10	15 October 2023	Stadion Narodowy, Warsaw, Poland	26	Moldova	1–1	1–1	UEFA Euro 2024 qualifying
11	10 June 2024	Stadion Narodowy, Warsaw, Poland	31	Turkey	1–0	2–1	Friendly
12	24 March 2025	Stadion Narodowy, Warsaw, Poland	40	Malta	1–0	2–0	2026 FIFA World Cup qualification
13	24 March 2025	Stadion Narodowy, Warsaw, Poland	40	Malta	2–0	2–0	2026 FIFA World Cup qualification
14	31 March 2026	Nationalarenan, Solna, Sweden	49	Sweden	2–2	2–3	2026 FIFA World Cup qualification

== Honours ==
PAOK

- Super League Greece: 2018–19
- Greek Cup: 2018–19, 2020–21

Individual

- Ekstraklasa Young Player of the Month: November 2018
