= Statue of Kazimierz Deyna =

Bronze statue in Warsaw, Poland

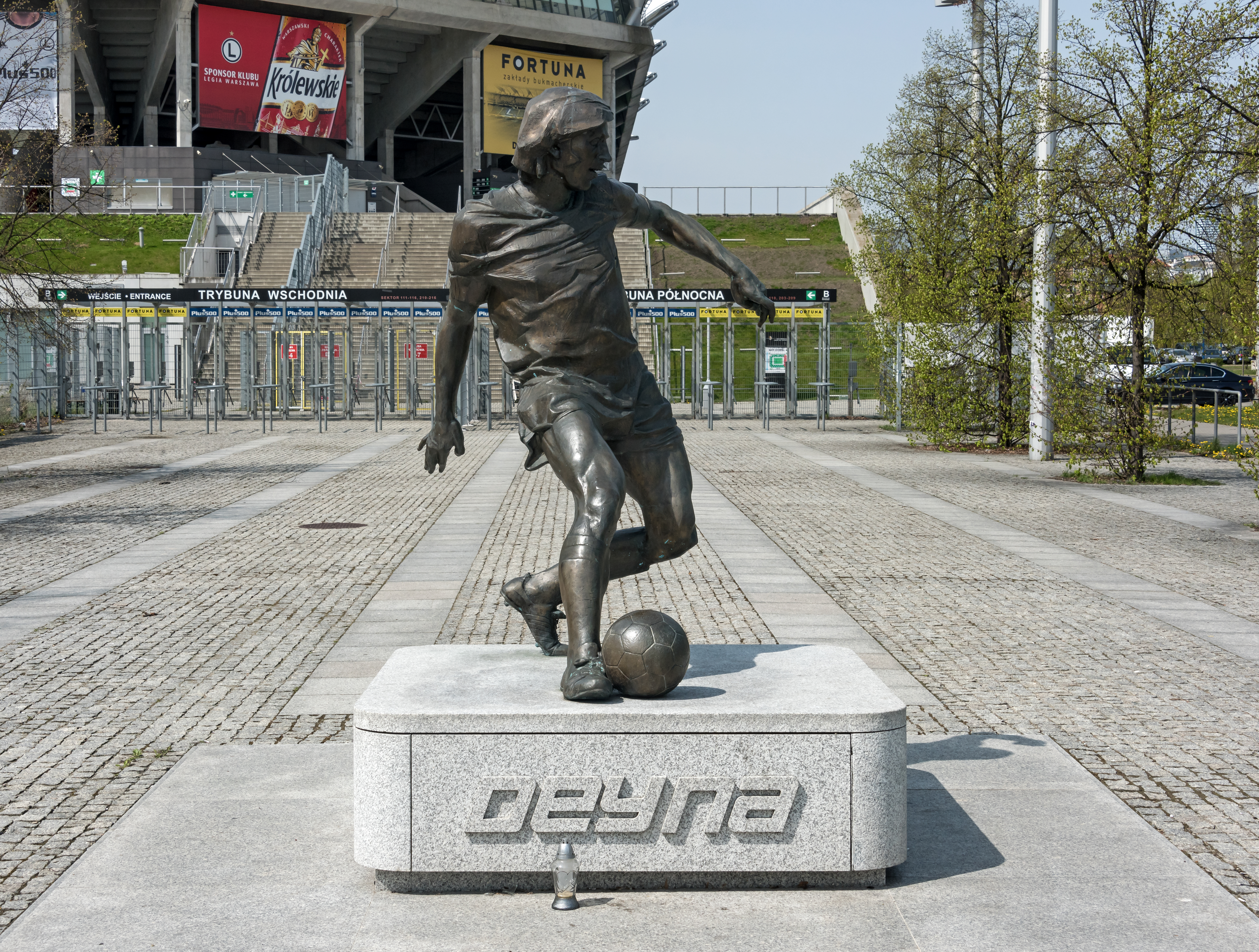
- The sculpture in 2021.
- Interactive map of Statue of Kazimierz Deyna
- Location: Łazienkowska Street, Downtown, Warsaw, Poland
- Coordinates: 52.221179°N 21.043412°E
- Type: Statue
- Material: Bronze
- Height: 2.2 m (7 ft 3 in)
- Opening date: 6 June 2012
- Dedicated to: Tomasz Radziewicz

The statue of Kazimierz Deyna (Polish pronunciation: [kaˈʑi.mjɛʂ ˈdɛj.na]; Polish: Pomnik Kazimierza Deyny) is a bronze statue in Warsaw, Poland. It is located in the neighbourhood of Ujazdów in the Downtown district, at Łazienkowska Street in front of the Polish Army Stadium. The sculpture, commemorating Kazimierz Deyna, a 20th-century association football player, was designed by Tomasz Radziewicz, and unveiled on 6 June 2012, shortly prior to the inauguration of the UEFA Euro 2012 tournament.

== History ==
The monument, dedicated to footballer Kazimierz Deyna (1947–1989), was proposed in 2008 by fans of Legia Warsaw association football club, whom, with support from the players, had formed a committee to fund it. 20 projects were submitted, of which two were selected by a committee, with the winner, made by Tomasz Radziewicz, being chosen in an online vote.

The monument was unveiled on 6 June 2012, by player's wife, Mariola Deyna, shortly prior to the inauguration of the UEFA Euro 2012 tournament. It became a first memorial dedicated to a footballer from Poland. In 2019, during the renovations, glass panels surrounding the pedestal, were replaced with granite ones.

== Characteristics ==
The bronze statue depicts Kazimierz Deyna, a 20th-century association football player, in a dynamic pose, feinting with the ball at his feet, while running with bent legs, balancing his body, and waving his arms. He is wearing a Legia Warsaw uniform, with number 10 on the back of his t-shirt. The sculpture has the height of 2.2 m, and is placed on a short pedestal, featuring a large inscription that reads "Deyna". It is locatated at Łazienkowska Street, in front of an entrance to the Polish Army Stadium.
