= 2020–21 PAOK FC season =

PAOK
2020–21 season
- President: Ivan Savvidis
- Manager: Pablo García
- Stadium: Toumba Stadium
- Super League: 2nd
- Greek Cup: Winners
- UEFA Champions League: Play-off round
- UEFA Europa League: Group stage
- Top goalscorer: League: Karol Świderski (11); All: Christos Tzolis (16)
Home colours	Away colours	Third colours

The 2020–21 PAOK FC season was the club's 95th season in existence and the club's 62nd consecutive season in the top flight of Greek football. In addition to the domestic league, PAOK participated in this season's editions of the Greek Cup and in the UEFA Champions League and the UEFA Europa League. The season covers the period from 20 July 2020 to 30 June 2021.

On 23 May 2021, PAOK defeated league champions Olympiacos in the Greek Cup Final to win the domestic cup for the 8th time in club history.

== Coaching staff ==
Position	Staff
Head coach	(Uruguay) Pablo García
Assistant Coach	(Poland) Mirosław Sznaucner
Goalkeeping Coach	(Croatia) Mario Galinovic

Last updated: 31 October 2020
Source: paokfc.gr

== Players ==
=== Squad ===
As of 7 March 2021

Note: Flags indicate national team as defined under FIFA eligibility rules; some limited exceptions apply. Players may hold more than one non-FIFA nationality.

No.	Pos.	Nation	Player
88	GK	SRB	Živko Živković
31	GK	GRE	Alexandros Paschalakis
64	GK	GRE	Christos Talichmanidis
2	DF	BRA	Rodrigo
4	DF	ISL	Sverrir Ingi Ingason
5	DF	CPV	Fernando Varela
6	DF	ALB	Enea Mihaj
21	DF	GHA	Baba Rahman (on loan from Chelsea)
16	DF	NOR	Adrian Pereira
19	DF	GRE	Lefteris Lyratzis
49	DF	GRE	Giannis Michailidis
15	DF	ESP	José Ángel Crespo (vice-captain)
7	MF	MAR	Omar El Kaddouri
8	MF	EGY	Amr Warda
10	MF	AUT	Thomas Murg

No.	Pos.	Nation	Player
20	MF	POR	Vieirinha (captain)
99	MF	BIH	Vladimir Bradonjić
23	MF	JPN	Shinji Kagawa
32	MF	GEO	Nika Ninua
33	MF	BRA	Douglas Augusto
51	MF	GRE	Theocharis Tsingaras
29	MF	GRE	Georgios Vrakas
22	MF	AUT	Stefan Schwab
65	MF	GRE	Giannis Konstantelias
11	FW	GRE	Christos Tzolis
14	FW	SRB	Andrija Živković
97	FW	GRE	Lazaros Lamprou
27	FW	CZE	Michael Krmenčík (on loan from Club Brugge)
9	FW	POL	Karol Świderski
70	FW	GRE	Georgios Koutsias

== Transfers ==
=== Players in ===
As of 30 January 2021

No.	Pos.	Nat.	Name	Age	EU	Moving from	Type	Transfer window	Ends	Transfer fee	Source
22	MF	(Austria)	Stefan Schwab	36	EU	(Austria) Rapid Wien	Free Transfer	Summer	2022	Free	
32	MF	(Georgia (country))	Nika Ninua	27	Non-EU	(Georgia (country)) Dinamo Tbilisi	Transfer	Summer	2024	€850,000	
16	DF	(Norway)	Adrian Pereira	27	Non-EU	(Norway) Viking	Transfer	Summer	2024	€760,000	
14	MF	(Serbia)	Andrija Živković	30	Non-EU	(Portugal) Benfica	Transfer	Summer	2022	Free	
29	MF	(Greece)	Georgios Vrakas	25	EU	(Italy) Napoli U19	Free Transfer	Summer	2023		
18	MF	(Senegal)	Moussa Wagué	28	Non-EU	(Spain) Barcelona	Loan	Summer	2021	Free	
25	FW	(Croatia)	Antonio Čolak	33	EU	(Croatia) Rijeka	Transfer	Summer	2021	€3,000,000	
10	MF	(Austria)	Thomas Murg	32	EU	(Austria) Rapid Wien	Transfer	Summer	2024	€2,000,000	
8	MF	(Egypt)	Amr Warda	33	Non-EU	(Greece) Volos	Transfer	Winter	2022	Free	
97	FW	(Greece)	Lazaros Lamprou	28	EU	(Netherlands) Twente	End of loan	Winter	2021	Free	
27	FW	(Czech Republic)	Michael Krmenčík	28	EU	(Belgium) Club Brugge	Loan	Winter	2021	Free	
23	MF	(Japan)	Shinji Kagawa	31	Non-EU	–	Transfer	Winter	2022	Free	
21	DF	(Ghana)	Baba Rahman	27	Non-EU	(England) Chelsea	Loan	Winter	2021	Free	
99	MF	(Bosnia and Herzegovina)	Vladimir Bradonjić	26	EU	(Bosnia and Herzegovina) Radnik Bijeljina	Transfer	Winter	2024	Free	

=== Players Out ===
As of 26 March 2021

No.	Pos.	Nat.	Name	Age	EU	Moving to	Type	Transfer window	Transfer fee	Source
22	FW	(Greece)	Lazaros Lamprou	28	EU	(Netherlands) Twente	Loan	Summer	Free	
8	MF	(Brazil)	Maurício	38	Non-EU	(Greece) Panathinaikos	End of contract	Summer	Free	
-	FW	(Ukraine)	Illya Markovskyy	29	Non-EU	(Cyprus) Enosis Neon Paralimni	Transfer	Summer	Free	
60	GK	(Greece)	Symeon Papadopoulos	26	EU	(Greece) Volos	Free transfer	Summer	Free	
–	GK	(Greece)	Nikolaos Botis	16	EU	(Italy) Inter Milan U19	Transfer	summer	€600,000	
99	FW	(Slovakia)	Miroslav Stoch	37	EU	TBA	Released	Summer	Free	
19	MF	(Sweden)	Pontus Wernbloom	40	EU	(Sweden) IFK Göteborg	Free transfer	Summer	Free	
–	FW	(Greece)	Alexandros Gargalatzidis	26	EU	(Greece) OFI	Free transfer	Summer	Free	
–	DF	(Greece)	Apostolos Diamantis	26	EU	(Greece) OFI	Free transfer	Summer	Free	
–	GK	(Greece)	Nikos Melissas	33	EU	(Greece) Panetolikos	Free transfer	Summer	Free	
–	DF	(Greece)	Marios Tsaousis	26	EU	(Slovakia) Spartak Trnava	Loan	Summer	Free	
–	MF	(Greece)	Zisis Chatzistravos	26	EU	(Greece) Lamia	Loan	Summer	Free	
47	FW	(England)	Chuba Akpom	31	EU	(England) Middlesbrough	Transfer	Summer	€3,000,000	(40% of the transfer fee to Arsenal)
18	FW	(Greece)	Dimitrios Limnios	28	EU	(Germany) 1. FC Köln	Transfer	Summer	€3,300,000 +15% resale	
74	MF	(Egypt)	Amr Warda	33	Non-EU	(Greece) Volos	Free Transfer	Summer	Free	
10	FW	(Greece)	Dimitrios Pelkas	33	EU	(Turkey) Fenerbahçe	Transfer	Summer	€1,600,000 +20% resale	
–	MF	(Greece)	Konstantinos Balogiannis	27	EU	(Greece) OFI	Transfer	Summer	Free (+30% of any resale plus €100,000 resigning price)	
–	FW	(Greece)	Antonis Gaitanidis	26	EU	(Greece) Levadiakos	Loan	Summer	Free	
–	DM	(Albania)	Ergys Kaçe	33	Non-EU	(Greece) Aris	Transfer	Summer	Free	
–	DF	(Bosnia and Herzegovina)	Marko Mihojević	30	EU	(Turkey) Göztepe	Transfer	Summer	€500,000	
–	MF	(France)	Thibault Moulin	36	EU	(France) MOS Caen	Free Transfer	Summer	Free	
–	GK	(Greece)	Nikos Bourganis	29	EU	(Greece) Karaiskakis	Loan	Summer	Free	
–	MF	(Croatia)	Josip Mišić	32	EU	(Portugal) Sporting CP	Loan Return	Summer	Free	
3	DF	(Brazil)	Léo Matos	40	Non-EU	(Brazil) Vasco Da Gama	Transfer	Summer	Free	
21	MF	(Suriname)	Diego Biseswar	32	EU	(Cyprus) Apollon Limassol	Loan	Winter	Free	
23	DF	(Greece)	Dimitris Giannoulis	25	EU	(England) Norwich City	Loan	Winter	€1,000,000	
18	DF	(Senegal)	Moussa Wagué	28	EU	(Spain) FC Barcelona	Loan return	Winter		
24	MF	(Nigeria)	Anderson Esiti	32	Non-EU	(Turkey) Göztepe	Loan	Winter		
1	GK	(Argentina)	Rodrigo Rey	35	Non-EU	(Argentina) Gimnasia La Plata	Free transfer	Winter		
25	FW	(Croatia)	Antonio Čolak	33	EU	(Sweden) Malmö FF	Loan	Winter	free (+buy option €3,000,000)	
98	FW	(Brazil)	Léo Jabá	28	Non-EU	(Brazil) Vasco Da Gama	Loan	Winter	Loan	

▼ Total spending: €6,600,000

▲ Total income: €8,800,000

▲ Net income €2,200,000

== Pre-season and other friendlies ==
Win Draw Loss

7 August 2020 Friendly	Atromitos	0–0	PAOK	Volos
19:30 EET, UTC+02:00			(penalty missed) 89' Świderski	Stadium: Panthessaliko Stadium; Attendance: C. doors Referee: Georgios Vreskas (Pieria)

10 August 2020 Friendly	PAOK	2–0	Volos	Volos
19:00 EET, UTC+02:00	Schwab (yellow card) 39'; Akpom 58'; Koutsias 81'; Wernbloom (yellow card) 90'			Stadium: Panthessaliko Stadium; Attendance: C. doors Referee: Stathis Gkortsilas (Macedonia)

5 September 2020 Friendly	Panathinaikos	0–1	PAOK	Kallithea, Athens
19:00 EET, UTC+02:00			39' Akpom	Stadium: Grigoris Lambrakis Stadium; Attendance: C. doors

== Competitions ==
=== Overview ===
Competition	First match	Last match	Starting round	Final position	Record							
Competition	First match	Last match	Starting round	Final position	Pld	W	D	L	GF	GA	GD	Win %
Super League Greece	12 September 2020	16 May 2021	Matchday 1	2nd	36	18	10	8	60	34	+26	50.00
Greek Football Cup	20 January 2021	22 May 2021	Round of 16	Winners	7	6	1	0	18	6	+12	85.71
UEFA Champions League	25 August 2020	30 September 2020	Second qualifying round	Play-off round	4	2	0	2	7	6	+1	50.00
UEFA Europa League	22 October 2020	10 December 2020	Group stage	Group stage	6	1	3	2	8	7	+1	16.67
Total					53	27	14	12	93	53	+40	50.94

Last updated: 22 May 2021
Source: Soccerway

=== Managerial statistics ===
Head coach	From	To	Record							
Head coach	From	To	G	W	D	L	GF	GA	GD	Win %
(Portugal) Abel Ferreira	25 August 2020	29 October 2020	11	4	5	2	14	9	+5	36.36
(Uruguay) Pablo García	30 October 2020	26 May 2021	42	23	9	10	79	44	+35	54.76

Last updated: 27 May 2021

=== Super League Greece ===
==== League table ====
Pos	Team	Pld	W	D	L	GF	GA	GD	Pts	Qualification
2	Aris	26	15	6	5	34	16	+18	51	Qualification for the Play-off round
3	AEK Athens	26	14	6	6	41	29	+12	48	Qualification for the Play-off round
4	PAOK	26	13	8	5	49	26	+23	47	Qualification for the Play-off round
5	Panathinaikos	26	13	6	7	30	19	+11	45	Qualification for the Play-off round
6	Asteras Tripolis	26	11	9	6	27	25	+2	42	Qualification for the Play-off round

Source: Super League Greece
Rules for classification: 1) Points; 2) Head-to-head points; 3) Head-to-head goal difference; 4) Goals scored; 5) Goals against.

=== Matches ===
11 September 2020 1	PAOK	1–0	AEL	Thessaloniki
20:30 EET, UTC+03:00	Tzolis 16'; Ingason (yellow card) 40'; El Kaddouri (yellow card) 55'; Pelkas (yellow card) 69'; Michailidis (yellow card) 73'		(yellow card) 42' Durmishaj; (yellow card) 50' Trujić; (yellow card) 53' Michail	Stadium: Toumba; Attendance: C. doors due to COVID-19; Referee: Petros Tsagarakis; Man of the Match: Tzolis

18 September 2020 2	PAOK	1–1	Atromitos	Thessaloniki
19:00 EET, UTC+03:00	A. Živković 57'		77' (o.g.) Mihaj; (yellow card) 28' Gianniotis; (yellow card) 40' Charisis; (yellow card) 88' Salomon; (yellow card) 93' Muñiz	Stadium: Toumba; Attendance: C. doors due to COVID-19; Referee: Dimitris Karantonis; Man of the Match: A. Živković

26 September 2020 3	Volos	0–0	PAOK	Volos
18:30 EET, UTC+03:00	Perea (yellow card) 45'; Douvikas (yellow card) 78'; Tekio (yellow card) 82'; Guarrotxena (yellow card) 95'			Stadium: Panthessaliko Stadium; Attendance: C. doors due to COVID-19; Referee: Vasilis Fotias; Man of the Match: Čolak

4 October 2020 4	PAOK	3–0	OFI	Thessaloniki
18:15 EET, UTC+03:00	El Kaddouri 8', (yellow card) 49'; Ingason (yellow card) 84'; Świderski 89', 90+2'		(yellow card) 24' Mellado; (yellow card) 29' Selimović; (yellow card) 43' Neira; (yellow card) 93' Diamantis	Stadium: Toumba; Attendance: C. doors due to COVID-19; Referee: Giorgos Tzovaras; Man of the Match: Z. Živković

18 October 2020 5	AEK Athens	1–1	PAOK	Athens
20:30 EET, UTC+03:00	Ansarifard 23'; Nedelcearu (yellow card) 40'; Krstičić (yellow card) 46'; Shakhov (yellow card) 77'; Livaja (yellow card) 84'		(yellow card) 55' Michailidis; 89' Murg	Stadium: Olympic Stadium; Attendance: C. doors due to COVID-19; Referee: Tobias Stieler (Germany); Man of the Match: Murg

1 November 2020 7	Panetolikos	1–3	PAOK	Agrinio
17:15 EET, UTC+02:00	Ariyibi 55' (pen.); Jakoliš (yellow card) 8'; Díaz (yellow card) 28'; Karasalidis (yellow card) 93'		18' Świderski; (yellow card) 25' Giannoulis; (yellow card) 30' A. Živković; (yellow card) 39' Schwab; (yellow card) 75' Wagué; (yellow card) 84' Esiti; 88', (yellow card) 89' Ninua; 90+5' (pen.) Čolak	Stadium: Panetolikos Stadium; Attendance: C. doors due to COVID-19; Referee: Athanasios Tzilos; Man of the Match: Ninua

8 November 2020 8	Apollon Smyrnis	1–3	PAOK	Athens
19:30 EET, UTC+02:00	Ioannidis (yellow card) 40'; Tsiloulis 63'; Slivka (yellow card) 70'; Tsabouris (yellow card) 71'; Lisgaras (yellow card) 77'; Bručić (yellow card) 77'		15' Świderski; (yellow card) 68' Murg; 78' (pen.) Schwab; 90+7' (pen.) Douglas Augusto	Stadium: Georgios Kamaras; Attendance: C. doors due to COVID-19; Referee: Anastasios Papapetrou (Athens); Man of the Match: Schwab

22 November 2020 9	PAOK	2–1	PAS Giannina	Thessaloniki
19:30 EET, UTC+02:00	Esiti (yellow card) 30'; Świderski 52'; El Kaddouri (yellow card) 83', (goal) 90+1'; A. Živković (yellow card) 84'		31', (yellow card) 45+2' (yellow-red card) 57' Erramuspe; (yellow card) 75' Kartalis; (yellow card) 90' Pantelakis	Stadium: Toumba; Attendance: C. doors due to COVID-19; Referee: Anastasios Sidiropoulos (Dodecanese); Man of the Match: El Kaddouri

29 November 2020 10	Lamia	0–2	PAOK	Lamia
17:15 EET, UTC+02:00	Bejarano (yellow card) 50'; Skondras (yellow card) 55'		12' (yellow card) 55' Tzolis; (yellow card) 39' Ingason; 64' Vieirinha	Stadium: Lamia Municipal Stadium; Attendance: C. doors due to COVID-19; Referee: Evangelos Manouhos; Man of the Match: El Kaddouri

6 December 2020 11	PAOK	2–0	Asteras Tripolis	Thessaloniki
17:15 EET, UTC+02:00	Giannoulis (yellow card) 28'; El Kaddouri (red card) 38'; Świderski (yellow card) 59'; Tzolis 64'; A. Živković 70' (pen.), (yellow card) 82'; Schwab (yellow card) 73'; Wagué (yellow card) 76'; Murg (yellow card) 90+3'		(yellow card) 23' R. García; (yellow card) 38' Suárez; (yellow card) 61' Fernández; (yellow card) 80' Tasoulis	Stadium: Toumba; Attendance: C. doors due to COVID-19; Referee: Vasilios Fotias (Pella); Man of the Match: Tzolis

13 December 2020 12	Aris	1–0	PAOK	Thessaloniki
19:30 EET, UTC+02:00	Bruno Gama 40' (pen.); Silva (yellow card) 67'; Benalouane (yellow card) 75'		(yellow card) 8' Douglas Augusto; (yellow card) 21' Tsingaras; (yellow card) 90+1' Giannoulis	Stadium: Kleanthis Vikelidis; Attendance: C. doors due to COVID-19; Referee: Bas Nijhuis (The Netherlands); Man of the Match: Wagué

20 December 2020 13	PAOK	2–1	Panathinaikos	Thessaloniki
19:30 EET, UTC+02:00	Świderski 11', (yellow card) 61'; Michailidis (yellow card) 45+1'; Giannoulis (yellow card) 56'; Vieirinha (yellow card) 58'; Ingason 65'; Crespo (yellow card) 85'; Schwab (yellow card) 86'		(yellow card) 6', (goal) 16' Aitor; (yellow card) 61' Macheda	Stadium: Toumba; Attendance: C. doors due to COVID-19; Referee: Tamás Bognár (Hungary); Man of the Match: Świderski

3 January 2021 14	AEL	1–1	PAOK	Larissa
17:15 EET, UTC+02:00	Filip (yellow card) 55'; Pinakas 69', (yellow card) 83'; Bertos (yellow card) 90'		(yellow card) 88' Ingason; 90+6' (pen.) Vieirinha; (yellow card) 90+7' Fernando Varela	Stadium: AEL FC Arena; Attendance: C. doors due to COVID-19; Referee: Angelos Evangelou Athens; Man of the Match: Tzolis

7 January 2021 15	Atromitos	3–2	PAOK	Athens
19:30 EET, UTC+02:00	Kotsopoulos (yellow card) 15'; Galvão (yellow card) 47'; Muñiz 64'; Kivrakidis (yellow card) 74'; Charisis 85'; Natsos 90+2', (yellow card) 95'		(penalty missed) 16' Tzolis; 22' Świderski; (yellow card) 36' Vieirinha; (yellow card) 41' Michailidis; (yellow card) 53' A. Živković; 82' Warda; (yellow card) 83' Lamprou	Stadium: Peristeri Stadium; Attendance: C. doors due to COVID-19; Referee: Aristotelis Diamantopoulos (Arcadia); Man of the Match: Warda

10 January 2021 16	PAOK	3–1	Volos	Thessaloniki
15:00 EET, UTC+02:00	Schwab 29' (pen.); A. Živković (yellow card) 43'; Vieirinha (yellow card) 48'; Ingason 66'; El Kaddouri (yellow card) 79'; Krmenčík 90'		11', (yellow card) 45' Kiakos; (yellow card) 29' Klaiman; (yellow card) 72' Douvikas	Stadium: Toumba; Attendance: C. doors due to COVID-19; Referee: Athanasios Tzilos (Larissa); Man of the Match: Warda

13 January 2021 6	PAOK	1–1	Olympiacos	Thessaloniki
19:30 EET, UTC+02:00	Krmenčík (yellow card) 21'; Paschalakis (yellow card) 35'; Ingason 51', (yellow card) 61'		77' Ba; (yellow card) 67' Rafinha	Stadium: Toumba; Attendance: C. doors due to COVID-19; Referee: Michael Fabbri (Italy); Man of the Match: Warda
Note: the match was postponed due to European obligations of both teams

17 January 2021 17	OFI	0–3	PAOK	Heraklion
17:15 EET, UTC+02:00	Waterman (red card) 22'		(yellow card) 42' Adrian Pereira; 48' Tzolis; 53' Varela; (yellow card) 64' Crespo; 67' Krmenčík	Stadium: Theodoros Vardinogiannis; Attendance: C. doors due to COVID-19; Referee: Anastasios Papapetrou (Athens); Man of the Match: Tzolis

24 January 2021 18	PAOK	2–2	AEK Athens	Thessaloniki
19:30 EET, UTC+02:00	Ingason (yellow card) 13'; Crespo 40'; Tzolis (yellow card) 57'; Vieirinha 70'; Warda (yellow card) 78'; El Kaddouri (yellow card) 90+7'		(yellow card) 38' Livaja; (yellow card) 40' Bakakis; 18' Shakhov; 51' Galanopoulos; (yellow card) 78' Lopes	Stadium: Toumba; Attendance: C. doors due to COVID-19; Referee: Slavko Vinčić (Slovenia); Man of the Match: Vieirinha

27 January 2021 19	Olympiacos	3–0	PAOK	Piraeus
19:30 EET, UTC+02:00	El-Arabi 50'; Camara 77'; Vrousai 89'			Stadium: Georgios Karaiskakis; Attendance: C. doors due to COVID-19; Referee: Brych (Germany); Man of the Match: Warda

31 January 2021 20	PAOK	5–0	Panetolikos	Thessaloniki
17:15 EET, UTC+02:00	Augusto (yellow card) 27'; Murg 39'; Schwab 51'; Tzolis 57'; Świderski 61', 90'; Pereira (yellow card) 79'		(yellow card) 55' Tsingaras; (yellow card) 83' Dálcio	Stadium: Toumba; Attendance: C. doors due to COVID-19; Referee: Angelos Evangelou; Man of the Match: Pereira

7 February 2021 21	PAOK	2–2	Apollon Smyrnis	Thessaloniki
15:00 EET, UTC+02:00	Warda 29'; Ingason (yellow card) 34', (goal) 88'		52' (pen.), (yellow card) 56' Tsabouris; 81' Fernández	Stadium: Toumba; Attendance: C. doors due to COVID-19; Referee: Vasilios Fotias (Pella); Man of the Match: Warda

15 February 2021 22	PAS Giannina	0–2	PAOK	Athens
19:30 EET, UTC+02:00	Domínguez (yellow card) 35'; Oikonomopoulos (yellow card) 70'		(penalty missed) 21', (yellow card) 90+3' Vieirinha; 56' Živković; 62' (pen.) Schwab; (yellow card) 87' Tsingaras	Stadium: Peristeri Stadium; Attendance: C. doors due to COVID-19; Referee: Aristotelis Diamantopoulos; Man of the Match: Tzolis

21 February 2021 23	PAOK	4–0	Lamia	Thessaloniki
15:00 EET, UTC+02:00	Baba 19'; Tzolis 48'; Warda 51'; A. Živković 66'; Schwab (yellow card) 74'		(yellow card) 71' Elmar; (yellow card) 79' Guga	Stadium: Toumba; Attendance: C. doors due to COVID-19; Referee: Aristomenis Koutsiaftis; Man of the Match: Tzolis

27 February 2021 24	Asteras Tripolis	2–1	PAOK	Tripoli
19:30 EET, UTC+02:00	Sito 37'; L. Fernández 54'		(yellow card) 74' Kagawa; 84' A. Živković	Stadium: Theodoros Kolokotronis; Attendance: C. doors due to COVID-19; Referee: Angelos Evangelou (Athens); Man of the Match: A. Živković

7 March 2021 25	PAOK	2–2	Aris	Thessaloniki
19:30 EET, UTC+02:00	A. Živković (yellow card) 12'; Schwab (yellow card) 50'; Ingason 87'; Krmenčík (yellow card) 90'; Vieirinha 90+4' (pen.)		26' Bertoglio; 69' Manos; (yellow card) 81' Mancini; (yellow card) 90+2' Boucher	Stadium: Toumba; Attendance: C. doors due to COVID-19; Referee: (Poland) Szymon Marciniak (Płock); Man of the Match: Ingason

14 March 2021 26	Panathinaikos	2–1	PAOK	Athens
19:00 EET, UTC+02:00	Maurício (yellow card) 35'; Macheda 39'; Mollo (yellow card) 62'; Ioannidis 82'; Carlitos (yellow card) 90+2'		(yellow card) 42' Świderski; (yellow card) 65' Crespo; (yellow card) 76' Baba; 84' (yellow card) 88'Krmenčík; (yellow card) 90+4' El Kaddouri	Stadium: Apostolos Nikolaidis; Attendance: C. doors due to COVID-19; Referee: Nathan Verboomen (Belgium); Man of the Match: Krmenčík

==== Results summary ====
Overall								Home						Away					
Pld	W	D	L	GF	GA	GD	Pts	W	D	L	GF	GA	GD	W	D	L	GF	GA	GD
26	13	8	5	49	26	+23	47	8	5	0	30	11	+19	5	3	5	19	15	+4

Last updated: 14 March 2021.

==== Results by round ====
Round	1	2	3	4	5	6	7	8	9	10	11	12	13	14	15	16	17	18	19	20	21	22	23	24	25	26
Ground	H	H	A	H	A	H	A	A	H	A	H	A	H	A	A	H	A	H	A	H	H	A	H	A	H	A
Result	W	D	D	W	D	W	W	W	W	W	L	W	D	L	W	D	W	D	L	W	D	W	W	L	D	L
Position	3	3	5	2	4	6	4	3	3	2	2	3	3	3	3	3	3	4	4	4	3	4	2	3	4	4

Updated to match(es) played on 14 March 2021. Source:
A = Away; H = Home; W = Win; D = Draw; L = Loss

== Play-off round ==
The top six teams from Regular season will meet twice (10 matches per team) for places in 2021–22 UEFA Champions League and 2021–22 UEFA Europa Conference League as well as deciding the league champion.

Pos	Team	Pld	W	D	L	GF	GA	GD	Pts	Qualification
1	Olympiacos (C)	36	28	6	2	82	19	+63	90	Qualification for the Champions League second qualifying round
2	PAOK	36	18	10	8	60	34	+26	64	Qualification for the Europa Conference League third qualifying round (Note: PAOK qualified for the Europa Conference League third qualifying round by winning the Greek Cup.)
3	Aris	36	17	10	9	41	26	+15	61	Qualification for the Europa Conference League second qualifying round
4	AEK Athens	36	17	9	10	53	45	+8	60	Qualification for the Europa Conference League second qualifying round
5	Panathinaikos	36	14	11	11	41	34	+7	53	
6	Asteras Tripolis	36	12	15	9	36	38	−2	51	

Source: Super League Greece
Rules for classification: 1) Points; 2) Head-to-head points (Regular season and play-off); 3) Head-to-head goal difference (Regular season and play-off); 4) Regular season position.
(C) Champions

=== Results summary ===
Overall								Home						Away					
Pld	W	D	L	GF	GA	GD	Pts	W	D	L	GF	GA	GD	W	D	L	GF	GA	GD
10	5	2	3	11	8	+3	17	3	1	1	7	2	+5	2	1	2	4	6	−2

Last updated: 16 May 2021.

=== Results by round ===
Round	1	2	3	4	5	6	7	8	9	10
Ground	H	A	A	H	A	H	A	H	A	H
Result	W	L	D	W	W	D	W	W	L	L
Position	3	3	3	3	3	3	2	2	2	2

Updated to match(es) played on 12 May 2021. Source: League matches
A = Away; H = Home; W = Win; D = Draw; L = Loss

=== Matches ===
Sunday, 21 March 2021 1	PAOK	3–1	AEK Athens	Thessaloniki
19:30 EET, UTC+02:00	A. Živković 3', 89'; Soares (yellow card) 17'; Świderski 46'; Schwab (yellow card) 23'; El Kaddouri (yellow card) 87'; Paschalakis (yellow card) 90+4'		(yellow card) 44' Szymański; 45+3' Oliveira; (yellow card) 79' Shakhov	Stadium: Toumba; Attendance: C. doors due to COVID-19; Referee: Nikola Dabanović (Montenegro); Man of the Match: A. Živković

Sunday, 4 April 2021 2	Panathinaikos	3–0	PAOK	Athens
15:00 EET, UTC+03:00	Macheda 39'; Poungouras (yellow card) 53'; Villafáñez 79'; Aitor 85'; Schenkeveld (yellow card) 90'		(yellow card) 26' Schwab; (yellow card) 36' Baba; (yellow card) 78' Crespo; (yellow card) 90' El Kaddouri	Stadium: Olympic Stadium; Attendance: C. doors due to COVID-19; Referee: Aliyar Aghayev (Azerbaijan); Man of the Match: Paschalakis

Sunday, 11 April 2021 3	Asteras Tripolis	1–1	PAOK	Tripoli
17:15 EET, UTC+03:00	Kotsiras (yellow card) 13'; Munafo (yellow card) 60' (goal) 65'		(yellow card) 51' A. Živković; 56' Świderski; (yellow card) 60' Augusto; (yellow card) 78' Crespo; (yellow card) 81' Warda; (yellow card) 90+5' El Kaddouri	Stadium: Theodoros Kolokotronis; Attendance: C. doors due to COVID-19; Referee: Dimitrios Karantonis (Greece); Man of the Match: Świderski

Sunday, 18 April 2021 4	PAOK	2–0	Olympiacos	Thessaloniki
19:30 EET, UTC+03:00	A. Živković 49', 63'		(yellow card) 39' Papadopoulos; (yellow card) 69' Reabciuk	Stadium: Toumba; Attendance: C. doors due to COVID-19; Referee: Aleksandar Stavrev (North Macedonia); Man of the Match: A. Živković

Wednesday, 21 April 2021 5	Aris	0–1	PAOK	Thessaloniki
19:30 EET, UTC+03:00	García (yellow card) 31'		6' Schwab; (yellow card) 40' Świderski; (yellow card) 60' Baba; (yellow card) 67' Douglas; (yellow card) 84' (yellow-red card) 86' Amr Warda	Stadium: Kleanthis Vikelidis; Attendance: C. doors due to COVID-19; Referee: Willy Delajod (France); Man of the Match: Paschalakis

Sunday, 25 April 2021 6	PAOK	0–0	Panathinaikos	Thessaloniki
15:00 EET, UTC+03:00	Tsiggaras (yellow card) 45+1'; Lyratzis (yellow card) 79'		(yellow card) 20' Vélez; (yellow card) 60' Ngbakoto; (yellow card) 77' Niasse	Stadium: Toumba; Attendance: C. doors due to COVID-19; Referee: Mattias Gestranius (Finland); Man of the Match: Paschalakis

Wednesday, 5 May 2021 7	AEK Athens	1–2	PAOK	Athens
21:30 EET, UTC+03:00	Shakhov (yellow card) 26'; Galanopoulos (yellow card) 45'; Lopes (yellow card) 50'; Tanković (yellow card) 86' (goal) 90+2' (pen.)		(yellow card) 43' A. Živković; (yellow card) 45' Douglas; 48' Krmenčík; 50' (pen.) (yellow card) 66' Schwab; (yellow card) 90+1' Tsingaras	Stadium: Olympic Stadium; Attendance: C. doors due to COVID-19; Referee: Irfan Peljto (BiH); Man of the Match: Warda

Sunday, 9 May 2021 8	PAOK	2–0	Aris	Thessaloniki
15:00 EET, UTC+03:00	Michailidis (yellow card) 14'; Schwab (yellow card) 51' (goal) 70'; Krmenčík (yellow card) 78'; A. Živković 90+1'		(yellow card) 15' Benalouane; (yellow card) 54' Gama; (yellow card) 84' Bertoglio	Stadium: Toumba; Attendance: C. doors due to COVID-19; Referee: Alexey Kulbakov (Belarus); Man of the Match: Michailidis

Wednesday, 12 May 2021 9	Olympiacos	1–0	PAOK	Piraeus
19:30 EET, UTC+03:00	32'		(yellow card) 7' Warda	Stadium: Georgios Karaiskakis; Attendance: C. doors due to COVID-19; Referee: Vasilis Fotias; Man of the Match: Tzolis

Sunday, 16 May 2021 10	PAOK	0–1	Asteras Tripolis	Thessaloniki
19:30 EET, UTC+03:00	Warda (yellow card) 86'		28' (pen.)	Stadium: Toumba; Attendance: C. doors due to COVID-19; Referee: Giorgos Tzovaras (Phthiotis); Man of the Match: Paschalakis

=== Greek Football Cup ===
==== First round ====
20 January 2021 1st leg	PAOK	5–0	AEL	Thessaloniki
17:15 EET, UTC+02:00	Tzolis 9', 23', 74'; Krmenčík 47'; A. Živković (yellow card) 49'; Ingason 55'		(yellow card) 69' Iliadis	Stadium: Toumba; Attendance: C. doors due to COVID-19; Referee: Evangelos Gratsanis; Man of the Match: Tzolis

3 February 2021 2nd leg	AEL	1–2 (1–7 agg.)	PAOK	Larissa
19:30 EET, UTC+02:00	39' (o.g.) Pereira; (yellow card) 40' Gotzamanidis; (yellow card) 86' Glynos		19' Tsingaras; 29' Krmenčík; (yellow card) 49' Lamprou	Stadium: AEL FC Arena; Attendance: C. doors due to COVID-19; Referee: Alexandros Tsakalidis; Man of the Match: Lamprou

==== Quarter-finals ====
Wednesday, 10 February 2021 1st leg	PAOK	5–2	Lamia	Thessaloniki
19:00 EET, UTC+02:00	Tzolis 6', 67', (yellow card) 85'; Schwab 55'; Rodrigo 82'; Krmenčík 88'		11' Adejo; (yellow card) 17' Piti; 24', (yellow card) 36' Bejarano	Stadium: Toumba; Attendance: C. doors due to COVID-19; Referee: Aristidis Vatsios; Man of the Match: Krmenčík

Wednesday, 3 March 2021 2nd leg	Lamia	1–1 (3–6 agg.)	PAOK	Lamia
18:00 EET, UTC+02:00	James 52'		14' Ninua; (yellow card) 34' Murg; (penalty missed) 45' Schwab	Stadium: Lamia Municipal Stadium; Attendance: C. doors due to COVID-19; Referee: Evangelos Manouhos; Man of the Match: Kagawa

==== Semi-finals ====
Wednesday 7 April 2021 1st leg	AEK Athens	0–1	PAOK	Athens
20:00 EET, UTC+03:00	Oliveira (yellow card) 19'; Mantalos (yellow card) 48'; García (yellow card) 80'; Albanis (yellow card) 87'		(yellow card) 20' A. Živković; (yellow card) 45+3' Vieirinha; (yellow card) 57' El Kaddouri; 90+4' Murg	Stadium: Olympic Stadium; Attendance: C. doors due to COVID-19; Referee: Georgi Kabakov (Bulgaria); Man of the Match: Paschalakis

Thursday 29 April 2021 2nd leg	PAOK	2–1 (3–1 agg.)	AEK Athens	Thessaloniki
19:00 EET, UTC+03:00	Ingason (yellow card) 34'; Vieirinha (yellow card) 45', (penalty missed) 60'; Krmenčík 84' (yellow card) 87'; A. Živković 90+5'		(yellow card) 37' Ansarifard; (yellow card) 59' (goal) 69' Galanopoulos; (yellow card) 87' Svarnas; (yellow card) 90+2' Nedelcearu	Stadium: Toumba; Attendance: C. doors due to COVID-19; Referee: Daniele Doveri (Italy); Man of the Match: Baba

==== Final ====
Saturday 22 May 2021 Greek Cup Final	Olympiacos	1–2	PAOK	Athens
21:00 EET, UTC+03:00	M'Vila 50'		36' (pen.) Vieirinha; (yellow card) 45+2' Douglas; 90' Krmenčík; (yellow card) 90+2' Schwab	Stadium: Olympic Stadium; Attendance: C. doors due to COVID-19; Referee: Danny Makkelie (The Netherlands); Man of the Match: Paschalakis

=== UEFA Champions League ===
==== Qualifying round and Play-off round ====
25 August 2020 Second qualifying round	PAOK (Greece)	3–1	(Turkey) Beşiktaş	Thessaloniki, Greece
21:00 EEST	Tzolis 7', 24'; Michailidis (yellow card) 22'; Pelkas 30', (yellow card) 69'; Akpom (penalty missed) 41'; Ingason (yellow card) 45+1'; El Kaddouri (yellow card) 63'	Report	N'Sakala (yellow card) 11'; Larin 37'	Stadium: Toumba Stadium; Attendance: C. doors due to COVID-19; Referee: Daniele Doveri (Italy); Man of the Match: Tzolis

15 September 2020 Third qualifying round	PAOK (Greece)	2–1	(Portugal) Benfica	Thessaloniki, Greece
21:00 EEST	Pelkas (yellow card) 1'; Varela (yellow card) 29'; Michailidis (yellow card) 45'; Giannoulis 63'; A. Živković 75'; Schwab (yellow card) 79'; Esiti (yellow card) 90+2'	Report	Almeida (yellow card) 44'; Silva 90+4'	Stadium: Toumba Stadium; Attendance: C. doors due to COVID-19; Referee: Brych (Germany); Man of the Match: Giannoulis

22 September 2020 Play-off First leg	Krasnodar (Russia)	2–1	(Greece) PAOK	Krasnodar, Russia
22:00 EEST	Pantaleão (yellow card) 6'; Claesson 39' (pen.), (yellow card) 55'; Cabella 70'; Berg (yellow card) 88'; Olsson (yellow card) 90+1'	Report	Pelkas (penalty missed) 7', 32'; Schwab (yellow card) 8'; Crespo (yellow card) 76'; Ingason (yellow card) 90+1'	Stadium: Krasnodar Stadium; Attendance: C. doors due to COVID-19; Referee: Clément Turpin (France); Man of the Match: El Kaddouri

30 September 2020 Play-off Second leg	PAOK (Greece)	1–2 (2–4 agg.)	(Russia) Krasnodar	Thessaloniki, Greece
22:00 EEST	Ingason (yellow card) 24'; Pelkas (yellow card) 37'; El Kaddouri 77', (yellow card) 90+1'	Report	Vilhena (yellow card) 33'; Pantaleão (yellow card) 35'; Michailidis 73' (o.g.); Cabella 78'	Stadium: Toumba Stadium; Attendance: C. doors due to COVID-19; Referee: Daniele Orsato (Italy); Man of the Match: El Kaddouri

=== Europa League ===
==== Group stage ====
The group stage draw was held on 2 October 2020.

Pos	Team	Pld	W	D	L	GF	GA	GD	Pts	Qualification	PSV	GRA	PAOK	OMO
1	(Netherlands) PSV Eindhoven	6	4	0	2	12	9	+3	12	Advance to knockout phase	—	1–2	3–2	4–0
2	(Spain) Granada	6	3	2	1	6	3	+3	11	Advance to knockout phase	0–1	—	0–0	2–1
3	(Greece) PAOK	6	1	3	2	8	7	+1	6		4–1	0–0	—	1–1
4	(Cyprus) Omonia	6	1	1	4	5	12	−7	4		1–2	0–2	2–1	—

Source: UEFA
Rules for classification: Group stage tiebreakers

22 October 2020 1	PAOK (Greece)	1–1	(Cyprus) Omonia	Thessaloniki, Greece
18:55 CEST (UTC+2)	Ingason (yellow card) 33'; Murg 56'; Giannoulis (yellow card) 59'	Report	Bauthéac 16', (yellow card) 17'; Lang (yellow card) 24'; Papoulis (yellow card) 36'; Tzionis (yellow card) 61'	Stadium: Toumba Stadium; Attendance: C. doors due to COVID-19; Referee: Bobby Madden (Scotland); Man of the Match: Murg

29 October 2020 2	Granada (Spain)	0–0	(Greece) PAOK	Granada, Spain
21:00 CEST (UTC+2)	Herrera (yellow card) 45'; Vallejo (yellow card) 68'	Report	Rodrigo (yellow card) 42'; Giannoulis (yellow card) 64'; A. Živković (yellow card) 74'; Douglas (yellow card) 90+2'	Stadium: Nuevo Los Cármenes; Attendance: C. doors due to COVID-19; Referee: Tiago Martins (Portugal); Man of the Match: Douglas

5 November 2020 3	PAOK (Greece)	4–1	(Netherlands) PSV	Thessaloniki, Greece
18:55 CEST (UTC+2)	Douglas (yellow card) 18'; Schwab 47'; A. Živković 56', 66'; Tzolis 58'	Report	Zahavi 21' (pen.); Sangaré (yellow card) 77'	Stadium: Toumba Stadium; Attendance: C. doors due to COVID-19; Referee: Daniel Stefański (Poland); Man of the Match: A. Živković

26 November 2020 4	PSV (Netherlands)	3–2	(Greece) PAOK	Eindhoven, Netherlands
21:00 CET (UTC+2)	Gakpo 20'; Madueke 51'; Malen 53'; Dumfries (yellow card) 90+5'	Report	Varela 4', (yellow card) 90+6'; Tsingaras (yellow card) 8'; Tzolis 13'; El Kaddouri (yellow card) 64'; Douglas (yellow card) 71'; Biseswar (yellow card) 90+4'	Stadium: Philips Stadion; Attendance: C. doors due to COVID-19; Referee: Andris Treimanis (Latvia); Man of the Match: A. Živković

3 December 2020 5	Omonia (Cyprus)	2–1	(Greece) PAOK	Strovolos, Cyprus
21:00 CET (UTC+2)	Kakoullis 9'; Sene (yellow card) 30'; Gómez 84' (pen.)	Report	El Kaddouri (yellow card) 31'; Tzolis 39'; Crespo (yellow card) 56'; Živković (yellow card) 64'; Giannoulis (yellow card) 75'	Stadium: GSP Stadium; Attendance: C. doors due to COVID-19; Referee: Craig Pawson (England); Man of the Match: Tzolis

10 December 2020 6	PAOK (Greece)	0–0	(Spain) Granada	Thessaloniki, Greece
18:55 CET (UTC+2)	Esiti (yellow card) 34'; Čolak (yellow card) 74'; Crespo (yellow card) 89'; Douglas (yellow card) 89'	Report	Pérez (yellow card) 86'; Germán (yellow card) 86'; Suárez (yellow card) 89'	Stadium: Toumba Stadium; Attendance: C. doors due to COVID-19; Referee: John Beaton (Scotland); Man of the Match: Paschalakis

== Statistics ==
=== Squad statistics ===
As of 22 May 2021

Appearances denote players in the starting lineup, with the numbers in parentheses denoting appearances as substitute.

No.	Name	Super League		Greek Cup		Champions League		Europa League		Total	
No.	Name	Apps	Goals	Apps	Goals	Apps	Goals	Apps	Goals	Apps	Goals
Goalkeepers
31	(Greece) Alexandros Paschalakis	18	0	6	0	0	0	1	0	25	0
88	(Serbia) Živko Živković	18	0	1	0	4	0	5	0	28	0
64	(Greece) Christos Talichmanidis	0	0	0	0	0	0	0	0	0	0
Defenders
2	(Brazil) Rodrigo Soares	17 (5)	0	4 (2)	1	1	0	4 (1)	0	26 (8)	1
4	(Iceland) Sverrir Ingason	25 (1)	5	5	1	4	0	4	0	38 (1)	6
5	(Cape Verde) Fernando Varela	20 (3)	1	3	0	4	0	6	1	33 (3)	2
6	(Albania) Enea Mihaj	3 (2)	0	0 (1)	0	0	0	0	0	3 (3)	0
15	(Spain) José Ángel Crespo	14 (7)	0	4 (1)	0	3	0	5	0	26 (8)	0
16	(Norway) Adrian Pereira	9 (1)	0	2	0	0	0	0	0	11 (1)	0
19	(Greece) Lefteris Lyratzis	4 (3)	0	2 (1)	0	0	0	1 (1)	0	7 (5)	0
49	(Greece) Giannis Michailidis	16 (3)	0	2 (1)	0	4	0	1	0	23 (4)	0
21	(Ghana) Baba Rahman	11 (2)	1	4	0	0	0	0	0	15 (2)	1
Midfielders
7	(Morocco) Omar El Kaddouri	18 (8)	2	2 (2)	0	4	1	4 (1)	0	28 (11)	3
10	(Austria) Thomas Murg	14 (10)	2	2 (3)	1	0	0	3 (3)	1	19 (16)	4
22	(Austria) Stefan Schwab	28 (5)	7	5 (1)	1	4	0	5	1	42 (6)	9
29	(Greece) Georgios Vrakas	1 (1)	0	0 (1)	0	0	0	0	0	1 (2)	0
32	(Georgia (country)) Nika Ninua	2 (7)	1	2 (1)	1	0	0	0	0	4 (8)	2
33	(Brazil) Douglas Augusto	18 (3)	1	4	0	0	0	2 (3)	0	24 (6)	1
51	(Greece) Theocharis Tsingaras	9 (7)	0	2 (3)	1	0	0	2 (2)	0	13 (12)	1
20	(Portugal) Vieirinha	19 (2)	4	4	1	0	0	0	0	23 (2)	5
8	(Egypt) Amr Warda	14 (9)	3	5 (1)	0	0	0	0	0	19 (10)	3
65	(Greece) Giannis Konstantelias	1 (2)	0	0	0	0	0	0	0	1 (2)	0
23	(Japan) Shinji Kagawa	1 (4)	0	1 (2)	0	0	0	0	0	2 (6)	0
Forwards
9	(Poland) Karol Świderski	21 (14)	11	4 (1)	0	0 (3)	0	1 (5)	0	26 (23)	11
11	(Greece) Christos Tzolis	25 (8)	6	4	5	4	2	3 (2)	3	36 (10)	16
97	(Greece) Lazaros Lamprou	1 (8)	0	1 (2)	0	0	0	0	0	2 (10)	0
27	(Czech Republic) Michael Krmenčík	13 (9)	4	3 (3)	5	0	0	0	0	16 (12)	9
14	(Serbia) Andrija Živković	27 (6)	10	5 (1)	1	2 (1)	1	5 (1)	2	39 (9)	14
70	(Greece) Georgios Koutsias	0 (2)	0	0 (3)	0	0	0	1	0	1 (5)	0
Players transferred out during the season
47	(England) Chuba Akpom	1	0	0	0	2	0	0	0	3	0
18	(Greece) Dimitrios Limnios	0	0	0	0	0 (1)	0	0	0	0 (1)	0
10	(Greece) Dimitrios Pelkas	3 (1)	0	0	0	4	2	0	0	7 (1)	2
3	(Brazil) Léo Matos	2	0	0	0	0	0	1	0	3	0
18	(Senegal) Moussa Wagué	4 (3)	0	0	0	0 (1)	0	1 (3)	0	5 (7)	0
23	(Greece) Dimitris Giannoulis	11 (1)	0	0	0	4 (1)	1	3	0	18 (2)	1
21	(Suriname) Diego Biseswar	2 (3)	0	0	0	0 (1)	0	1 (3)	0	3 (7)	0
24	(Nigeria) Anderson Esiti	5 (4)	0	0	0	0 (2)	0	2	0	7 (6)	0
1	(Argentina) Rodrigo Rey	0	0	0	0	0	0	0	0	0	0
25	(Croatia) Antonio Čolak	3 (7)	1	0	0	0 (1)	0	5	0	8 (8)	1
98	(Brazil) Léo Jabá	0 (1)	0	0	0	0 (1)	0	0	0	0 (2)	0

=== Goalscorers ===
As from 22 May 2021

Rank	No.	Pos.	Player	Super League	Greek Cup	Champions League	Europa League	Total
1	11	FW	(Greece) Tzolis	6	5	2	3	16
2	14	FW	(Serbia) A. Živković	10	1	1	2	14
3	9	FW	(Poland) Świderski	11	0	0	0	11
4	22	MF	(Austria) Schwab	7	1	0	1	9
4	27	FW	(Czech Republic) Krmenčík	4	5	0	0	9
6	4	DF	(Iceland) Ingason	5	1	0	0	6
7	20	DF	(Portugal) Vieirinha	4	1	0	0	5
8	10	MF	(Austria) Murg	2	1	0	1	4
9	7	MF	(Morocco) El Kaddouri	2	0	1	0	3
9	8	MF	(Egypt) Warda	3	0	0	0	3
11	10	MF	(Greece) Pelkas	0	0	2	0	2
11	5	DF	(Cape Verde) Varela	1	0	0	1	2
11	32	MF	(Georgia (country)) Ninua	1	1	0	0	2
14	25	FW	(Croatia) Čolak	1	0	0	0	1
14	33	MF	(Brazil) Douglas Augusto	1	0	0	0	1
14	23	DF	(Greece) Giannoulis	0	0	1	0	1
14	15	DF	(Spain) Crespo	1	0	0	0	1
14	51	MF	(Greece) Tsingaras	0	1	0	0	1
14	2	DF	(Brazil) Rodrigo	0	1	0	0	1
14	21	DF	(Ghana) Baba	1	0	0	0	1
Own goals				0	0	0	0	0
TOTAL				60	17	8	8	93

=== Clean sheets ===
As of 22 May 2021

Player	League	Cup	CL	EL	Total	Games played	Percentage
(Greece) Alexandros Paschalakis	6	1	0	1	8	25	32,00%
(Serbia) Živko Živković	7	1	0	1	9	28	32,14%
Total	13	2	0	2	17	53	32,08%

=== Disciplinary record ===
As of 22 May 2021

S	P	N	Name	Super League			Cup			Champions League			Europa League			Total		
S	P	N	Name	Yellow card	Yellow-red card	Red card	Yellow card	Yellow-red card	Red card	Yellow card	Yellow-red card	Red card	Yellow card	Yellow-red card	Red card	Yellow card	Yellow-red card	Red card
7	AM	(Morocco)	Omar El Kaddouri	9	0	1	1	0	0	2	0	0	2	0	0	14	0	1
31	GK	(Greece)	Alexandros Paschalakis	2	0	0	0	0	0	0	0	0	0	0	0	2	0	0
15	DF	(Spain)	José Ángel Crespo	5	0	0	0	0	0	1	0	0	2	0	0	8	0	0
33	DF	(Brazil)	Douglas Augusto	5	0	0	10	0	0	0	0	0	4	0	0	10	0	0
88	GK	(Serbia)	Živko Živković	0	0	0	0	0	0	0	0	0	0	0	0	0	0	0
5	DF	(Cape Verde)	Fernando Varela	1	0	0	0	0	0	1	0	0	1	0	0	3	0	0
4	DF	(Iceland)	Sverrir Ingason	7	0	0	1	0	0	3	0	0	1	0	0	12	0	0
9	FW	(Poland)	Karol Świderski	4	0	0	0	0	0	0	0	0	0	0	0	4	0	0
49	DF	(Greece)	Giannis Michailidis	5	0	0	0	0	0	2	0	0	0	0	0	7	0	0
11	FW	(Greece)	Christos Tzolis	2	0	0	1	0	0	0	0	0	0	0	0	3	0	0
2	DF	(Brazil)	Rodrigo Soares	1	0	0	0	0	0	0	0	0	1	0	0	2	0	0
6	DF	(Albania)	Enea Mihaj	0	0	0	0	0	0	0	0	0	0	0	0	0	0	0
22	MF	(Austria)	Stefan Schwab	9	0	0	1	0	0	2	0	0	0	0	0	12	0	0
14	FW	(Serbia)	Andrija Živković	8	0	0	2	0	0	0	0	0	2	0	0	12	0	0
32	MF	(Georgia (country))	Nika Ninua	1	0	0	0	0	0	0	0	0	0	0	0	1	0	0
10	MF	(Austria)	Thomas Murg	2	0	0	1	0	0	0	0	0	0	0	0	3	0	0
51	MF	(Greece)	Theocharis Tsingaras	4	0	0	0	0	0	0	0	0	1	0	0	5	0	0
20	MF	(Portugal)	Vieirinha	4	0	0	2	0	0	0	0	0	0	0	0	6	0	0
97	FW	(Greece)	Lazaros Lamprou	1	0	0	1	0	0	0	0	0	0	0	0	2	0	0
27	FW	(Czech Republic)	Michael Krmenčík	4	0	0	1	0	0	0	0	0	0	0	0	5	0	0
16	DF	(Norway)	Adrian Pereira	2	0	0	0	0	0	0	0	0	0	0	0	2	0	0
8	MF	(Egypt)	Amr Warda	4	1	0	0	0	0	0	0	0	0	0	0	4	1	0
23	MF	(Japan)	Shinji Kagawa	1	0	0	0	0	0	0	0	0	0	0	0	1	0	0
21	DF	(Ghana)	Baba Rahman	3	0	0	0	0	0	0	0	0	0	0	0	3	0	0
19	DF	(Greece)	Lefteris Lyratzis	1	0	0	0	0	0	0	0	0	0	0	0	1	0	0
Players transferred out during the season
10	AM	(Greece)	Dimitrios Pelkas	1	0	0	0	0	0	3	0	0	0	0	0	4	0	0
21	MF	(Suriname)	Diego Biseswar	0	0	0	0	0	0	0	0	0	1	0	0	1	0	0
23	DF	(Greece)	Dimitris Giannoulis	4	0	0	0	0	0	0	0	0	3	0	0	7	0	0
24	MF	(Nigeria)	Anderson Esiti	2	0	0	0	0	0	1	0	0	1	0	0	4	0	0
25	FW	(Croatia)	Antonio Čolak	0	0	0	0	0	0	0	0	0	1	0	0	1	0	0
98	FW	(Brazil)	Léo Jabá	0	0	0	0	0	0	0	0	0	0	0	0	0	0	0
18	DF	(Senegal)	Moussa Wagué	2	0	0	0	0	0	0	0	0	0	0	0	2	0	0
