= Amr Warda =

Egyptian footballer (born 1993)

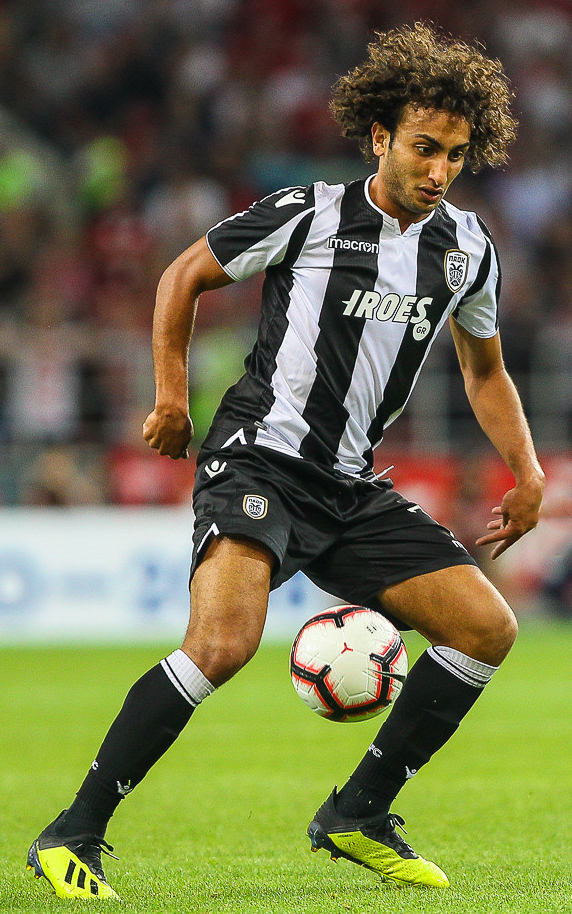
- Warda with PAOK in 2018

Personal information
- Full name: Amr Medhat Mohsen Warda
- Date of birth: 17 September 1993 (age 33)
- Place of birth: Alexandria, Egypt
- Height: 1.76 m (5 ft 9 in)
- Positions: Forward; attacking midfielder

Youth career
- 2009–2011: Alexandria Sporting
- 2011–2013: Al Ahly

Senior career*
Years	Team	Apps	(Gls)
2013–2015	Al Ahly	1	(0)
2015	→ Al Ittihad (loan)	16	(1)
2015–2017	Panetolikos	39	(9)
2017–2020	PAOK	19	(2)
2017–2018	→ Atromitos (loan)	23	(8)
2019	→ Atromitos (loan)	12	(2)
2019–2020	→ AEL (loan)	22	(6)
2020–2021	Volos	10	(2)
2021	PAOK	21	(3)
2021–2023	Anorthosis	41	(10)
2023	Apollon Limassol	19	(4)
2023	Raja CA	0	(0)
2023	Doxa Katokopias	0	(0)
2023	Pharco	1	(0)
2024	Panserraikos	17	(5)
2024–2025	Atromitos	27	(4)
2025–2026	AEL	8	(1)
2026	Iraklis	9	(0)

International career^{‡}
2010–2013	Egypt U20	4	(0)
2014–2017	Egypt U23	5	(0)
2015–2019	Egypt	30	(1)
Medal record
Representing Egypt
Men's football
Africa Cup of Nations
Runner-up	2017 Gabon
- * Club domestic league appearances and goals as of 5 July 2026 ‡ National team caps and goals as of 6 July 2019

Amr Medhat Mohsen Warda (Egyptian Arabic: عمرو مدحت محسن وردة; born 17 September 1993) is an Egyptian professional footballer who plays as a forward.

== Club career ==
=== Panetolikos ===
On 22 August 2015, Warda signed a three-year contract with Panetolikos on a free transfer from Al Ahly. Panetolikos winger Amr Warda is happy to be rewarded for the Best Goal of the second matchday in the Super League Greece. "I'm very happy that fans voted my goal as the best. I'll try to do my best for me and my team. This goal was important not only for me but for my team too. We proved to be a good team. From my first day in Panetolikos everyone treated me nice. We co-operate and try for the best", Warda said. On 20 December 2015, he scored the first goal in a 2–0 crucial home win against Iraklis and was named man of the match.

On 11 September 2016, he scored his first goal for the 2016–17 season in a 2–1 away loss against PAOK. A week later, he scored in a 0–2 away win against rivals Atromitos. On 6 November 2016, he scored the first goal in a 2–1 home win against AEL.

=== PAOK ===
On 24 January 2017, Warda signed a 3,5-year contract with PAOK, for an annual fee of €250,000. He became the seventh Egyptian to play for PAOK after former Egyptian internationals Magdy Tolba, Hossam Hassan, Ibrahim Hassan, Abdel Sattar Sabry, Shikabala and Amir Azmy. The transfer fee was reported to be €350,000, while Panetolikos keeping a 15% future percentage sale. He chose to wear number 7 in Greece and number 74 in European matches. On 23 April 2017, he scored his first league goal for PAOK in a 3–1 away win against Platanias. Warda, who played the full 90 minutes, scored the opener after four minutes when he shot into the bottom corner following a low cross from the left. On 2 July 2017, according to the media, Warda would not follow PAOK's squad in preparation for disciplinary problems and would soon be loaned.

On 9 August 2017, it was announced Warda would be loaned to Feirense. He joined the Portuguese club on a one-year loan deal worth €1.25 million. On 12 August 2017, however, Portuguese media reported Warda would exit Feirense just three days after joining, after Record reported Warda had harassed the wives of two of his teammates. A few days later, the Portuguese club terminated the agreement.

=== Loan to Atromitos ===
On 29 August 2017, Warda joined Atromitos on a season-long loan. On 23 September 2017, he scored his first goal with the club in a 3–0 home win against Lamia On 16 December 2017, his club beat 3–1 struggling rivals, Kerkyra on the road, thanks to a second-half brace by the international midfielder, who named MVP of the game. Warda was named the best playmaker of the first round of the season after his displays with Atromitos. Warda scored five goals and assisted twice in 12 outings in the league.

=== Return to PAOK ===
In the summer of 2018, Warda returned to PAOK ahead of the 2018–19 season. On 21 August 2018, Warda scored a goal in a 1–1 away UEFA Champions League play-off game against Benfica. A feud between Warda and PAOK manager, Răzvan Lucescu, saw Warda being dropped from the squad on several occasions.

=== Second spell in Atromitos ===
On 24 January 2019, Warda rejoined Atromitos for the rest of the 2018–19 season, with an option to make the transfer permanent. On 16 February 2019, Warda scored a tap-in after a run from fellow PAOK loanee Dimitris Chatziisaias in a 0–2 away win against PAS Giannina. On 23 February 2019, he equalized the score after an assist from Javier Umbides in a 1–1 away draw against Asteras Tripolis.

=== Loan to AEL ===
On 30 August 2019, Warda joined AEL on a season-long loan. On 28 September 2019, he scored his first goal with the club, with a header after Ergys Kaçe's corner, sealing a 2–3 away win against Aris. On 22 January 2020, he scored a brace in a 2–2 home draw game against Panetolikos F.C., first by a spot-kick to put Larissa back into the match and just six minutes later, with a penalty kick conceded by Frederico Duarte on Warda.

=== Volos ===
On 28 September 2020, having completed his loan spell at AEL, the 27-year-old left the White-Blacks for Volos on a one-year contract for an undisclosed fee. On 17 October 2020, he scored a goal on his debut in a 2–1 win against PAS Giannina.

=== Third spell to PAOK ===
On 5 January 2021, after three months at the Panthessaliko Stadium, Warda returned to PAOK on a permanent deal from Volos. On 13 July 2021, Greek reports indicated that Warda didn't finish his training with the team following a disciplinary offense he committed and was kicked out of the session by the head coach Răzvan Lucescu. As a result, Warda was officially expelled of the club, looking the next club of his career.

=== Anorthosis Famagusta ===
On 29 August 2021, Anorthosis announced the signing of Warda on a free transfer, with PAOK keeping a 50% resale rate.

Warda was awarded as the MVP of the Cyprus championship at the PASP event for the 2021–22 season, based on the voting of the A Division football players themselves. He made 27 league appearances, ending his season with 9 goals and 8 assists.

On 21 July 2022, Anorthosis announced the renewal of Warda's contract until 2023. However, his contract was terminated early in January 2023.

=== Apollon Limassol ===
Not long after, Warda signed for Apollon Limassol on a six-month contract until the end of the 2022–23 season. The season had begun with Apollon facing challenges and struggling. With Warda in the lineup, Apollon's attacking efficiency improved significantly, helping them climb the ranks and regain their competitive edge. He made 19 appearances and counted 4 goals and 4 assists.

=== Raja, Doxa and Pharco ===
On 12 August 2023, Warda joined Moroccan side Raja Casablanca on a two-year deal. Twelve days later, the club announced they agreed to terminate Warda's contract at his request, citing personal reasons, after he paid his release clause.

Soon after, on 24 August 2023, he signed a contract with Cypriot side Doxa Katokopias, but the agreement was cancelled shortly after, with some reports claiming he was expelled and others suggesting he was not allowed into the country.

After he was initially reported to have signed with Esteghlal on 28 August, Warda joined another Egyptian side Pharco FC on 9 September.

=== Panserraikos ===
On 20 December 2023, Greek side Panserraikos announced that Warda would join the club starting from 1 January 2024. On 3 May 2024, his contract with the club was terminated by mutual consent.

== International career ==
On 11 October 2015, Warda made his debut for the Egypt national team in a friendly match against Zambia in Abu Dhabi. His good spell at Panetolikos resulted in him receiving a call-up from Héctor Cúper to the 30-man provisional 2017 Africa Cup of Nations squad. He helped Egypt reach the final by scoring the last penalty in the semifinals over the Burkina Faso, but the crucial last match ended in a 1–2 defeat by Cameroon.

On 4 March 2016, Warda was called up in Egypt squad ahead of friendly games against Nigeria on 25 and 29 March.

In May 2018, he was named in Egypt's preliminary squad for the 2018 FIFA World Cup in Russia. On 26 June 2019, Warda was excluded from the national team camp over sexual harassment claims. However, the Egyptian Football Association recalled him to the national team two days later after the player posted an apology video on his official account on Facebook.

== Personal life ==
He is the son of former international basketball player Mohsen Medhat Warda.

=== Harassment allegations ===
In 2017, Warda's loan with Portuguese football club Feirense was terminated after allegations that he sexually harassed the wives of two of his teammates.

In 2019, Warda was alleged to have sent inappropriate messages online. Following reports that he had sexually harassed a number of women, Amr Warda was expelled from Egypt's roster for the Africa Cup of Nations, but was reinstated two days later.

== Career statistics ==
As of 27 April 2024

Appearances and goals by club, season and competition
Club	Season	League			National cup (Note: Includes Egyptian Cup, Greek Football Cup, Cypriot Cup)		Continental		Other		Total	
Club	Season	Division	Apps	Goals	Apps	Goals	Apps	Goals	Apps	Goals	Apps	Goals
Al Ahly	2013–14	Egyptian Premier League	1	0	2	0	0	0	0	0	3	0
Al Ittihad (loan)	2014–15	Egyptian Premier League	16	1	0	0	0	0	0	0	16	1
Panetolikos	2015–16	Super League Greece	27	5	3	0	–		–		30	5
Panetolikos	2016–17	Super League Greece	12	4	3	1	–		–		15	5
Panetolikos	Total		39	9	6	1	–		–		45	10
PAOK	2016–17	Super League Greece	8	2	2	0	2 (Note: Appearances in UEFA Europa League)	0	2 (Note: Appearances in Super League Greece European play-offs)	0	14	2
PAOK	2018–19	Super League Greece	9	0	2	0	11 (Note: Six appearances and one goal in UEFA Champions League, five appearances in UEFA Europa League)	1	–		22	3
PAOK	Total		17	2	4	0	13	1	2	0	36	5
Atromitos (loan)	2017–18	Super League Greece	23	8	5	3	–		–		28	11
Atromitos (loan)	2018–19	Super League Greece	12	2	2	0	–		–		14	2
Atromitos (loan)	Total		35	10	7	3	–		–		42	13
AEL (loan)	2019–20	Super League Greece	22	6	1	1	–		–		23	7
Volos	2020–21	Super League Greece	10	2	0	0	–		–		10	2
PAOK	2020–21	Super League Greece	21	3	6	0	–		–		27	3
Anorthosis	2021–22	Cypriot First Division	29	9	6	2	6 (Note: Appearances in UEFA Europa Conference League)	0	–		41	11
Anorthosis	2022–23	Cypriot First Division	12	1	0	0	–		–		12	1
Anorthosis	Total		41	10	6	2	6	0	–		53	12
Apollon	2022–23	Cypriot First Division	19	4	0	0	0	0	–		19	4
Pharco	2023–24	Egyptian Premier League	1	0	0	0	0	0	–		1	0
Panserraikos	2023–24	Super League Greece	11	3	3	0	0	0	6 (Note: Appearances in Super League Greece Play-out round)	2	20	5
Career total			232	50	35	8	19	1	4	2	295	61

=== International ===
As of 31 August 2019

Appearances and goals by national team and year
National team	Year	Apps	Goals
Egypt	2015	3	0
Egypt	2016	2	0
Egypt	2017	7	0
Egypt	2018	13	1
Egypt	2019	5	0
Egypt	Total	30	1

As of match played 31 August 2019. Egypt score listed first, score column indicates score after each Warda goal.

International goals by date, venue, cap, opponent, score, result and competition
No.	Date	Venue	Cap	Opponent	Score	Result	Competition
1	12 October 2018	Al Salam Stadium, Cairo, Egypt	22	Eswatini	2–0	4–1	2019 Africa Cup of Nations qualification

== Honours ==
Al Ahly

- Egyptian Premier League: 2013–14

PAOK

- Greek Cup: 2016–17, 2020–21

Individual

- Super League Greece Best Foreign Player: 2017–18
- Super League Greece Player of the Season: 2017–18
- Super League Greece Team of the Season: 2017–18
- Cypriot First Division Player of the Season: 2021–22
- Cypriot First Division Team of the Season: 2021–22
