= Żyleta =

Northern stand at the Stadion Wojska Polskiego in Warsaw, Poland

Coordinates: 52°13′16″N 21°02′27″E

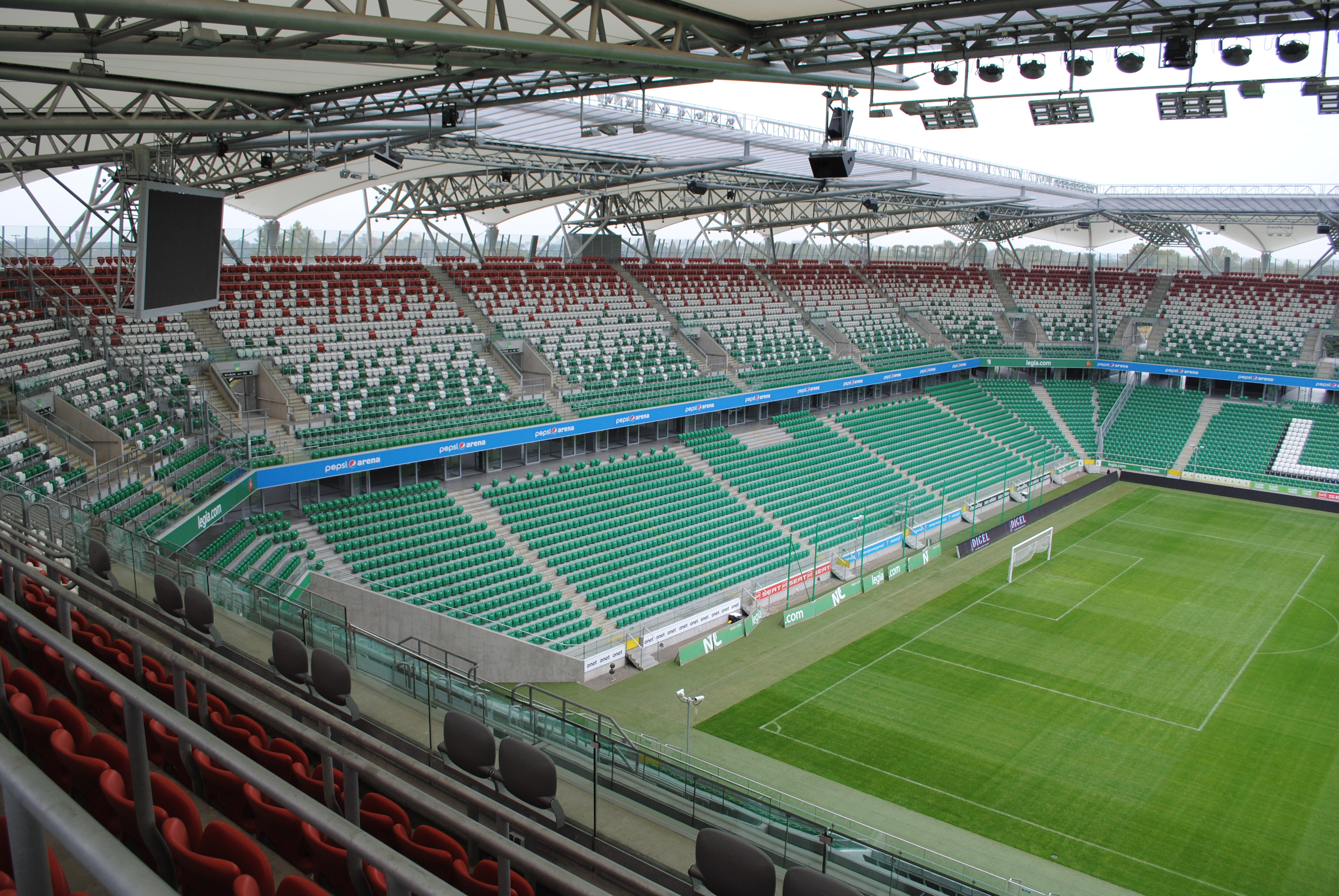
Żyleta

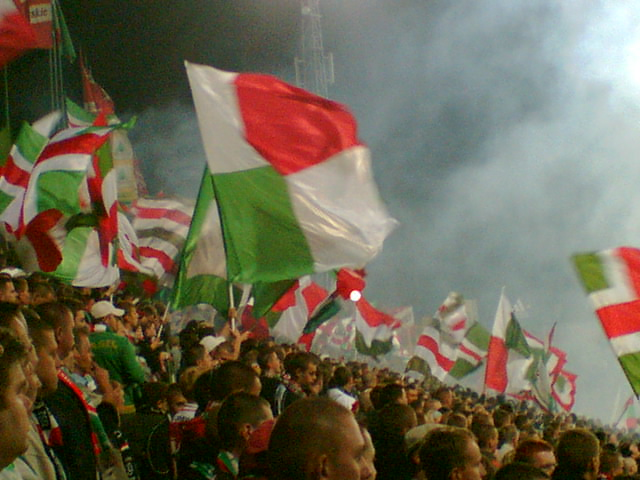
Żyleta stand during Legia - Polonia 1–0 match, Warsaw derby in 2005

Żyleta (Polish pronunciation: [ʐɨˈlɛta], English: the Razor) is a common name of a northern stand at the Stadion Wojska Polskiego in Warsaw, Poland, traditionally occupied by the most spontaneous and fanatical fans of Legia Warsaw football club. Before the stadium renovation (2008–2011), the "old" Żyleta referred only to the center section within the eastern stand of the stadium (occasionally, it would also refer to eastern stand as a whole). There is a special exhibition dedicated to the "old" Żyleta in the Legia club museum. Today, after the stadium renovation, the "new" Żyleta means the whole northern stand of stadium (located behind the goal).

The eastern stand of the stadium was constructed in the 1930s. Until the late 1970s, the stand was simply referred to as the "open" stand (in contrast to the "covered" western stand, which was fully roofed). The eastern stand was nicknamed "Żyleta" after the Polsilver razor billboard that was placed above its center section. The name has been in use since the late 1970s. The razor billboard was removed from the stadium by way of punishment imposed on Legia supporters, after the riots during the 1995 Polish Cup final.

Throughout the years Żyleta became more than a section of the stadium, it has become a synonym of the devoted and affectionate support of the football team. Żyleta became famous for its spectacular visual displays, in particular card stunts, prepared by Legia supporters and presented during matches. The quality of support and of the visual displays was often said to be "unquestionably the best in Poland". Thanks to this high reputation, Żyleta is regarded by the football supporters as an "exclusive" section of the stadium. Only the fans who obey the unofficial code of conduct (the key point of which is the non-stop support during the entire football match) are "privileged" to take a seat at Żyleta. However, Żyleta has also attracted some negative attention. Especially during the mid-1990s, it had often been associated with football violence and fanaticism.
