= Łazienki Street =

Road in Warsaw, Poland

Łazienki Street Ulica Łazienkowska
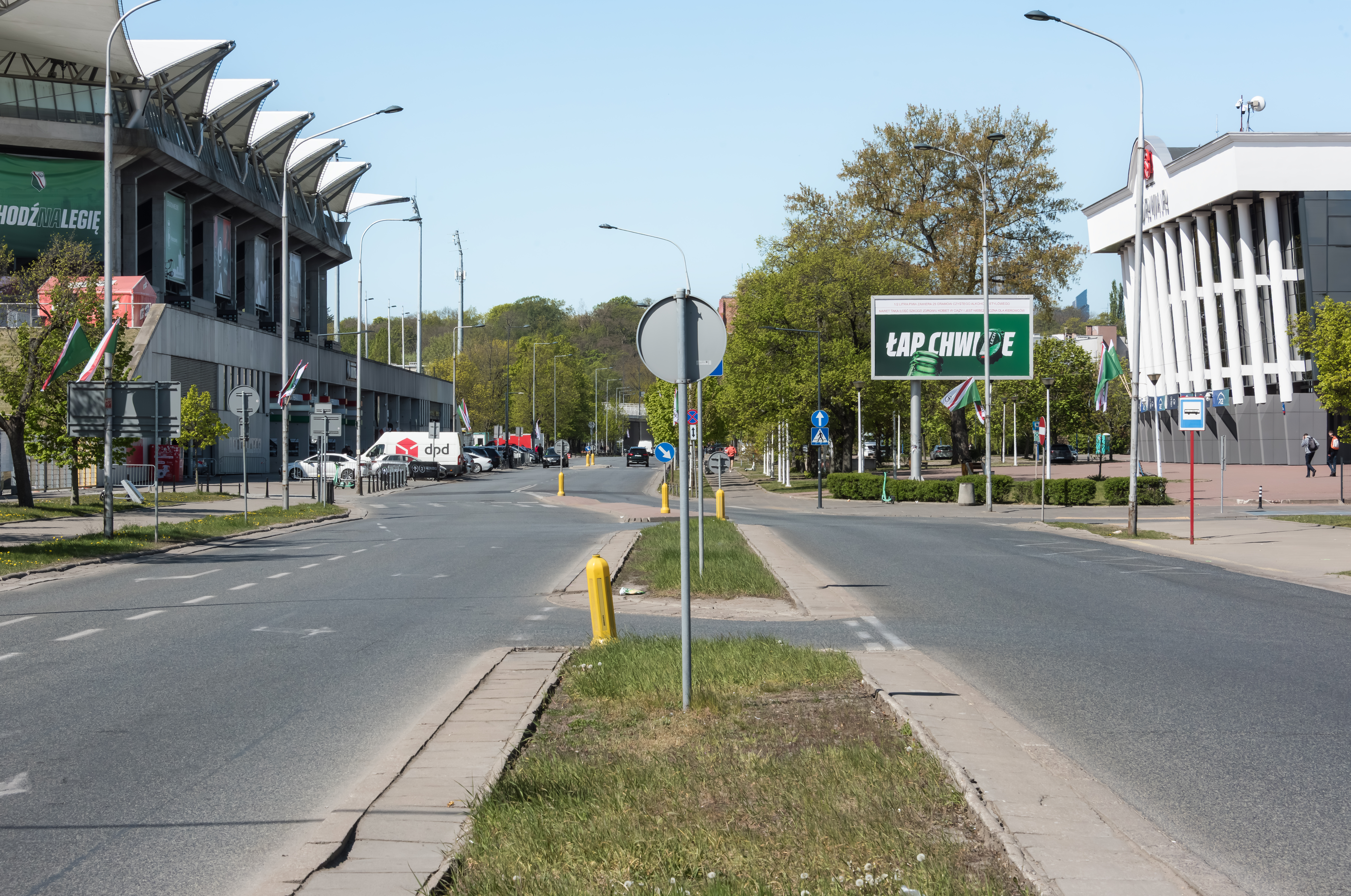
- Interactive map of Łazienki Street; Ulica Łazienkowska
- Namesake: Łazienki
- Length: 600 m (2,000 ft)
- Location: Warsaw
- East end: Czerniakowska Street
- West end: Rozbrat Street

The Łazienki Street or Łazienkowska Street (Polish: Ulica Łazienkowska) is a street in the Warsaw's Śródmieście district, running from Czerniakowska Street to Stanisław Sedlaczek roundabout and Rozbrat Street.

== History ==
The street was likely established at the end of the 19th century along the northern boundary of the Russian cavalry barracks complex.

Around 1930, pools, the city stadium, and tennis courts belonging to the Central Military Sports Club "Legia" were built on the site of the former barracks. In 1937, the construction of the Polish Scouting Association House, designed by Tadeusz Koszubski and Stefan Putowski, was completed at number 7.

Between 1923 and 1933, a church dedicated to Our Lady of Częstochowa was built on the street, designed by Hugon Kuder.

On 1 August 1944, at W-hour, insurgents unsuccessfully attacked the Polish Scouting Association House, occupied by the Germans until the capitulation of the uprising. In August 1944, a barricade was erected on the street. In September 1944, the Germans bombed the church of Our Lady of Częstochowa. Most of the wounded transferred from the neighboring insurgent hospital "Blaszanka" perished in its ruins. After the war, a funeral chapel located in the unfinished campanile was adapted to meet the needs of the faithful. Part of the church grounds, along with the rectory, was taken over for the construction of the Łazienki Route. In the 1980s and 1990s, the ruined building was expanded, and the chapel-converted church was dedicated to Our Lady of Jerusalem.

In 1946, the bus depot at 8 Łazienkowska Street, which was 45% destroyed, was rebuilt as a trolleybus depot. In 1953, the Torwar indoor ice rink was established.

Between 2008 and 2010, the Polish Army Stadium used by Legia Warsaw was replaced with a new facility.

In 2008, the Legia pools basin was demolished, in 2011 the functionalist locker room building, and in 2012 or 2013 the distinctive diving tower.

== Notable landmarks ==
- Kazimierz Deyna Monument
- Polish Army Stadium with Legia Warsaw Museum
- Torwar I and Torwar II halls, including the headquarters of the Central Sports Center
- Church of Our Lady of Jerusalem
- Former Polish Scouting Association House, now home to MDK Łazienkowska
