= Nikos Gotzamanidis =

Greek footballer

Personal information
- Full name: Nikolaos Gotzamanidis
- Date of birth: 25 January 2001 (age 25)
- Place of birth: Katerini, Greece
- Height: 1.89 m (6 ft 2 in)
- Position: Centre-back

Team information
- Current team: Olympiacos B
- Number: 33

Youth career
- 2011–2013: PAOK
- 2013–2015: Pontioi Katerini
- 2015–2020: Olympiacos

Senior career*
Years	Team	Apps	(Gls)
2020–2023	AEL	40	(2)
2023–2024	Panserraikos	11	(0)
2024–	Olympiacos	0	(0)
2024–2025	→ Lamia (loan)	23	(1)
2025–	Olympiacos B	23	(1)

International career^{‡}
2016–2017	Greece U16	4	(0)
2016–2018	Greece U17	13	(2)
2018	Greece U18	1	(0)
2019	Greece U19	4	(0)
- * Club domestic league appearances and goals as of 20 September 2026 ‡ National team caps and goals as of 22:37, 19 November 2019 (UTC)

Nikos Gotzamanidis (Greek: Νίκος Γκοτζαμανίδης; born 25 January 2001) is a Greek professional footballer who plays as a centre-back for Super League club Olympiacos B.
