= Polish Army Stadium =

Polish football stadium

Coordinates: 52°13′14″N 21°2′26″E

Stadion Wojska Polskiego
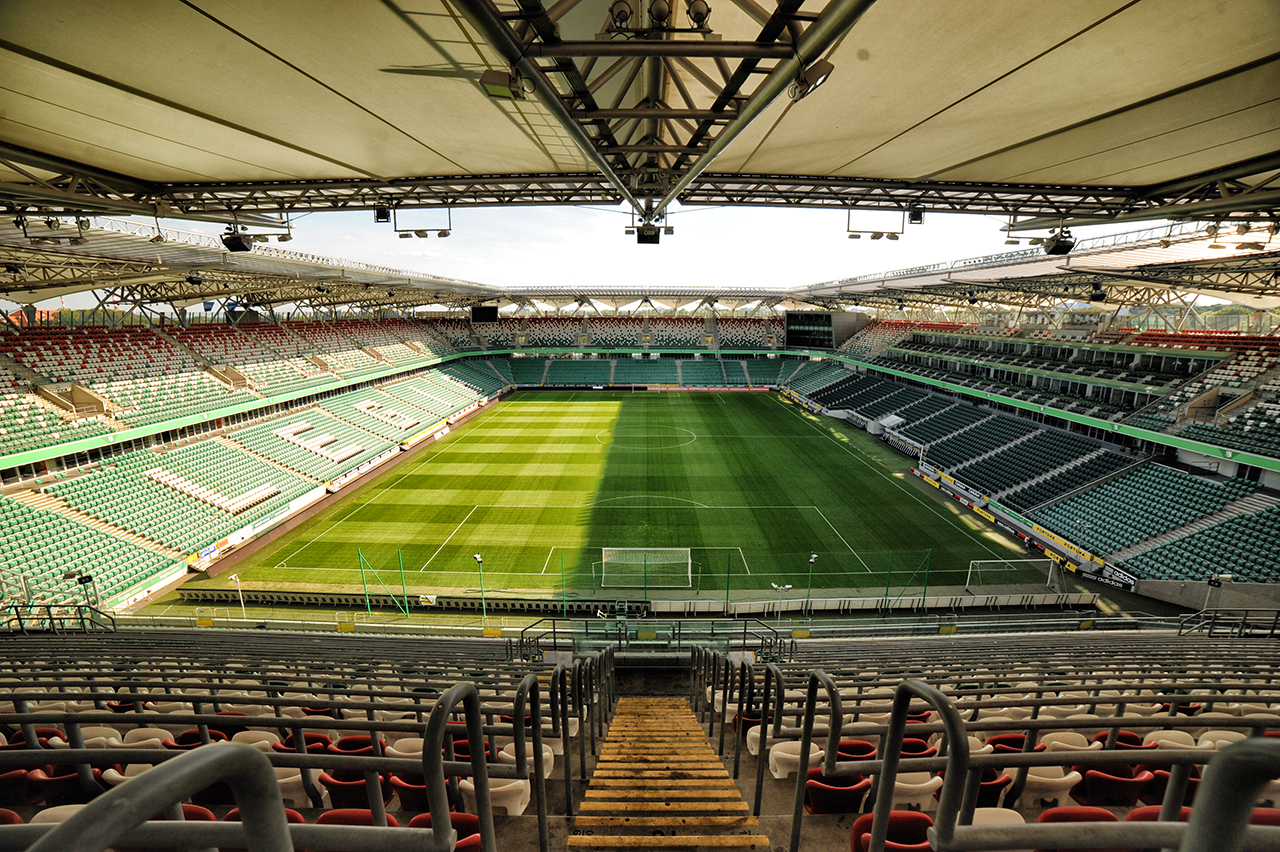
- UEFA Category 4 Stadium
- Interactive map of Stadion Wojska Polskiego
- Full name: Stadion Miejski Legii Warszawa im. Marszałka Józefa Piłsudskiego
- Former names: Pepsi Arena (19 July 2011 - 31 December 2014)
- Location: 3 Łazienkowska Street, 00-449 Warsaw, Poland
- Owner: City of Warsaw
- Operator: Legia Warsaw
- Capacity: 31,103
- Surface: Grass
- Record attendance: 30,787 (Legia Warsaw - Śląsk Wrocław, 2 June 2013)
- Field size: 105 × 68 metres

Construction
- Groundbreaking: 1927
- Built: 1927–1930
- Opened: 9 August 1930
- Renovated: 2008–2011
- Cost: PLN 460 million EUR € 110 million
- Architect: JSK Architekci
- Project manager: Zbigniew Pszczulny Mariusz Rutz

Tenants
- Legia Warsaw (1930–present); Poland national team (selected matches); Shakhtar Donetsk (2022–23 UEFA Champions League / 2022–23 UEFA Europa League home matches)

Website
- biznes.legia.com

The Polish Army Stadium (Polish: Stadion Wojska Polskiego, pronounced [ˌstadjɔn ˌvɔjska pɔlˈskʲɛɡɔ]), official named the Marshall Józef Piłsudski Legia Warsaw Stadium (Polish: Stadion Legii Warszawa im. Marszałka Józefa Piłsudskiego), is an all-seater, highest fourth category football-specific stadium located at 3 Łazienkowska Street in the Śródmieście district, Powiśle area, within the square of the streets: Łazienkowska, Czerniakowska, Kusocińskiego and Myśliwiecka. It is the home ground of Legia Warsaw football club, who have been playing there since 9 August 1930.

The stadium underwent a two-stage, complete reconstruction in the years 2008–2011. Only a small part of the main building facade was preserved from the old construction (with another part being precisely reconstructed). With space for 31,103 spectators it is the 5th biggest football stadium in Ekstraklasa and the 7th biggest in the country. The stadium is equipped with a heated pitch, training pitch, underground parking, sport bar, club museum and other facilities.

The stadium, which for decades belonged to the Polish Armed Forces, is currently owned by the City of Warsaw.

== The original stadium ==
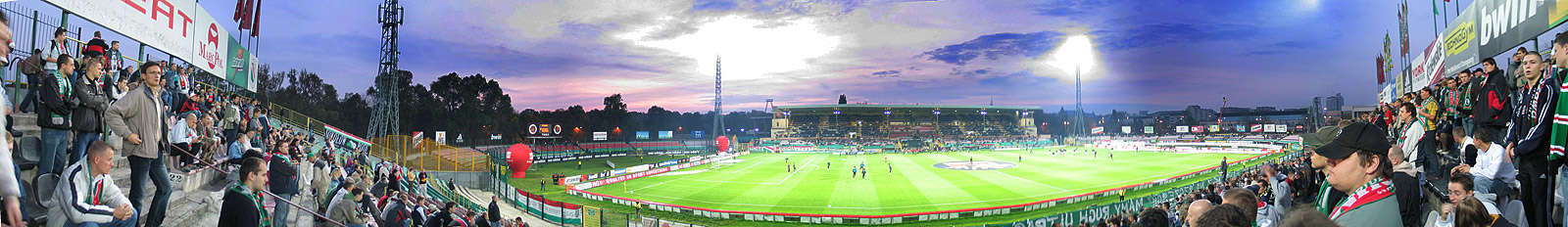
Panorama of the old stadium, 2007

In 1929, Legia obtained a subsidy that enabled the implementation of the plan to build a representative Military Stadium. The stadium was built according to the design of Maksymilian Dudryk-Darlewski. Under the main stand, which had a capacity of 5,000 people, there were club rooms, locker rooms, gymnasiums, sports magazines and a common room. There was a running track and a cycling track around the pitch. It officially opened on 9 August 1930.

The first motorcycle speedway was raced on 9 November 1930 and in 1933, the stadium was officially named the Polish Army Stadium. The stadium suffered damage during World War II and the offensive of the Red Army and the Polish Army in January 1945.

After the end of the war, the destroyed areas were rebuilt. At the end of the 1950s, attendance records were set at the Stadium when Legia won the Polish championship and qualified for European cups. The first record, 40,000 spectators was set on 19 September 1956 during the European Cup match between Legia Warszawa and Slovan Bratislava. In the 1960s, the stadium underwent one of the most significant modernisations in its history, able to accommodate a 25,000 seated audience and installing artificial lighting.

Speedway held significant fixtures at the stadium, including qualifying rounds of the Speedway World Championship in 1956, 1957, 1958, 1961, 1962 and 1964. At the end of 1987, at the Legia stadium, the speedway track was removed and the football field was widened.

== The new stadium ==
=== Construction Background ===
The necessity to build a new stadium for Legia Warszawa players increased in the mid-1990s, when Legia had one of the most successful periods in its history. Championship of Poland (1994, 1995), Polish Cup (1995, 1997), semi-final of the UEFA Cup Winners' Cup (1991) and the quarter-final of the UEFA Champions League (1996) strengthened the demand to modernize or even replace the old facility. Ultimately, however, until 1997 virtually nothing on this subject has been done.

The complicated legal status of the land, which belonged to the military, effectively discouraged potential investors. The new hope came together with the new owners – Daewoo company, which bought the majority stake in Legia in the late 1996. The Korean club owners strongly lobbied the City of Warsaw to take over the property and invest in the new facility, however, the then owners of the site – the Military Property Agency – was not willing to sell the property. The deadlock existed for the next 5 years, during which time the Koreans sold the club. Eventually, the sale went through on 29 July 2002, when the City of Warsaw acquired the title to the land. Although the market value was estimated at 60 million PLN, the purchase price was agreed at 16 million PLN. In October 2004, Warsaw's chief architect Michał Borowski gave permission to build a new stadium on the said land. The decision led to the announcement of tender for redevelopment of the Legia's facilities.

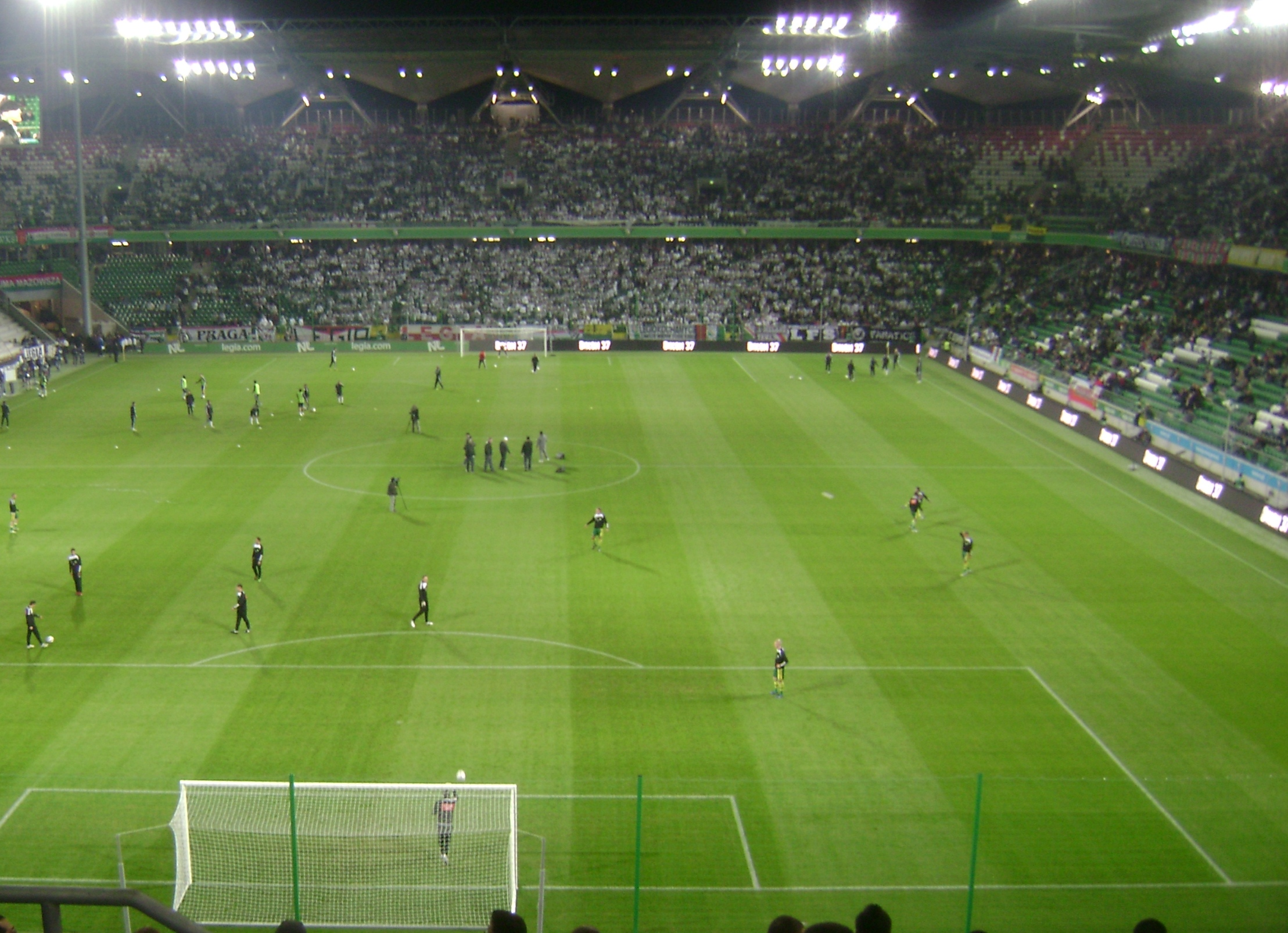
Żyleta filled with fans during a charity match between Legia and ADO Den Haag

On 25 September 2006, the City of Warsaw dismissed the offer of the German consortium: HMB Stadien GmbH und Sportstättenbau with Wayss Schlüsselfertigbau und Freytag AG and Krupp Stahlbau Hannover GmbH, which had won the tender. Their project planned the construction of a building with a capacity of 30,500 to 35,000 spectators, with underground parking, and – a first at a Polish sports facility – was supposed to have a fully retractable roof. The City, however, did not accept the consortium's condition that all the funds for the construction be secured by the investor prior to the construction. The Polish side cancelled the deal.

On 26 September 2006, Legia's new owners – ITI Group – during a meeting with the acting President of Warsaw Kazimierz Marcinkiewicz, in the club premises presented their own idea of rebuilding the stadium. Their idea provided for the construction of the stadium in stages (so that the club could still play games during the construction), with the capacity between 31,000 and 34,000 seats (depending whether standing spaces were included). In November of that year, the club signed a 23-year lease with the City of Warsaw. In June 2007, the Warsaw City Council allocated 360 million PLN in funding (which later had to be increased to 460 million PLN) for the construction of the new stadium according to the club's proposed design. In April 2008 the then President of Warsaw Hanna Gronkiewicz-Waltz issued a permit for the construction of the stadium. On 12 November 2008 the investor – the City of Warsaw – signed an agreement with a consortium Polimex-Mostostal for the construction works.

On 17 November 2008 the first stage of the new stadium construction began. This stage provided for the demolition and construction of three stands: the southern, the eastern, and the northern one. Works began by the demolition of the club's old premises and of the eastern stand (the famous "Żyleta"). The first stage was completed and taken over by the investor on 10 May 2010. The stadium was officially opened (with only three stands completed) by a match against Arsenal F.C. on 7 August 2010. The second stage of construction, which provided for the demolition and construction of the eastern stand (the main stand – so-called "Kryta") was completed and taken over by the investor on 10 May 2011.

=== Stadium characteristics ===
==== Overall ====
The most recent reconstruction, November 2008 to March 2011, involved the demolition of all the stands and the construction of brand new ones, with only the historic façade of the main "Kryta" grandstand preserved. The stadium is commonly referred to as the "Nowy Stadion (New Stadium)" in its current form. The new stadium, designed by the German studio JSK Architekten, meets the criteria for the UEFA Elite class, which allows it to host semi-finals of the Champions League. The facility is five storeys high and is fully roofed with its maximum height not allowed to be higher than nearby Ujazdów Castle. The stadium includes press boxes, office spaces, as well as a fitness and wellbeing center for players and coaching staff. There are also 12 catering stands, a sports bar, Legia club museum and two club merchandise stores located within the stadium.

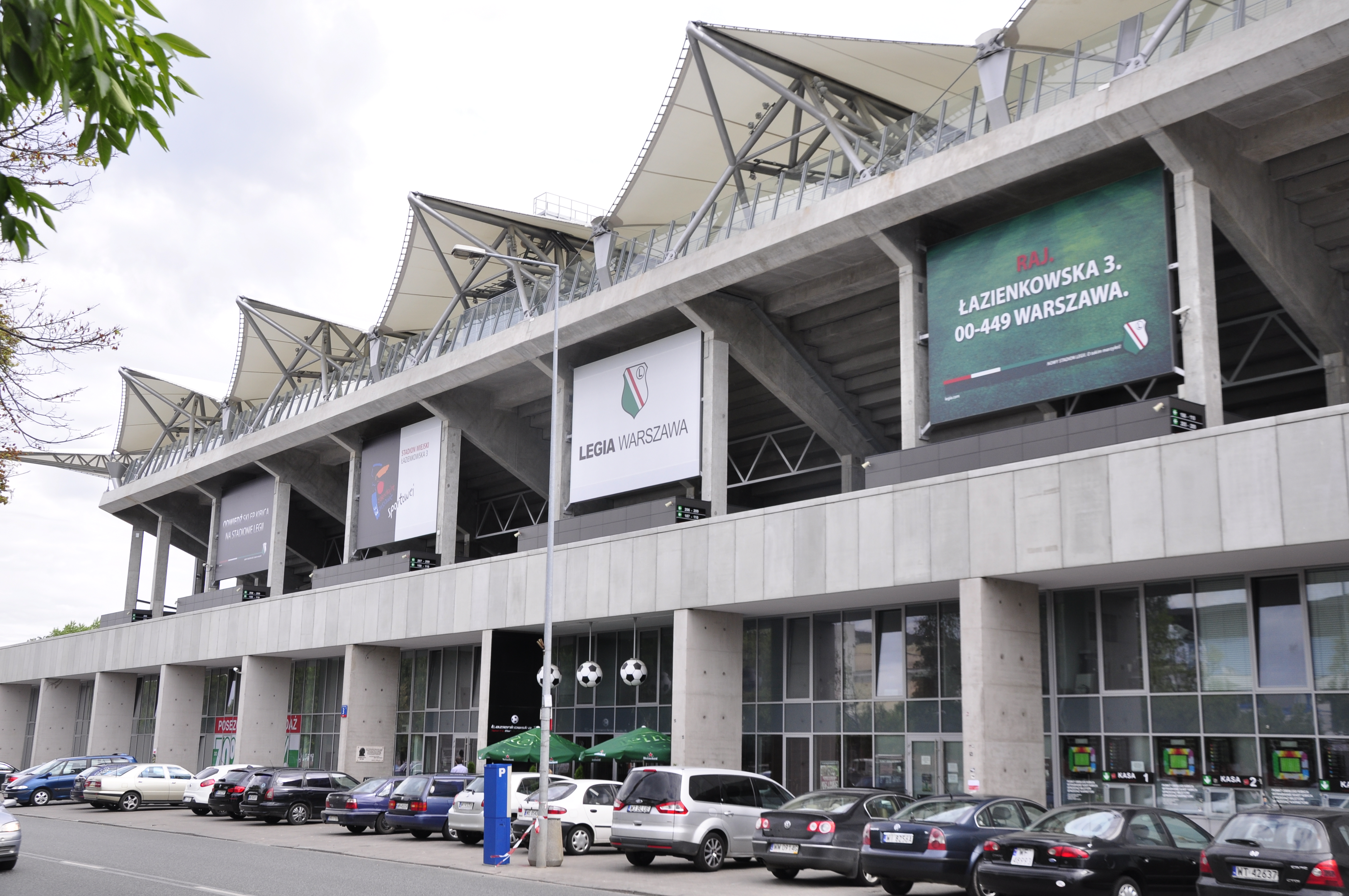
Northern stand as seen from the Łazienkowska street

==== Capacity and stand's location ====
The stadium's capacity is variable. The general capacity is 31,103 all seating spaces, however it is possible to increase the capacity up to 33,609, by way of creating 6,126 standing spaces (leaving 27,483 seats). These figures include press posts and VIP seats in the total amount of 2,137. The number of press posts can be increased at the cost of seats for regular spectators. The location of the stands compared to the old stadium has not been changed. Only the playing field has been slightly moved in a south-eastern direction. The stadium has four two-level stands. These are: the western stand (the main stand, commonly referred to as "Kryta"), the eastern stand (named after Kazimierz Deyna), the northern stand (commonly referred to as "Żyleta") and the southern stand (unofficially named after Lucjan Brychczy). Within the first level of the southern, eastern and northern stands located are the parking lots.

==== Seats and railings ====
The seats in the stadium are made from polypropylene. They are resistant to weather conditions and mechanical damage. A similar model is already used in Allianz Arena. The stadium has three categories of seats: the regular seats, press seats and VIP seats. Press seats have additional desktop space, power sockets and Internet access. Seat colours on the stadium is associated with the club's colours. The lower level of the stands is green, while the upper is a mix of three colors: green, white and red. There is a white inscription "LEGIA" on the east grandstand. The railings of the stadium are made of glass, which allows to comfortably watch the sport events. The railings are 130 cm high and 2 cm thick. They consist of double-layer glass shields, which may resist up to 200 kg per square meter.

==== Video screens ====
The stadium has two video screens. They are attached to the steel elements of the roof structure in the north-west and south-east corners of the stadium. The screens are 5.4 m wide and 9.4 m high. Each of them weighs 7 tones.

==== Security system ====
The entrance gates are equipped with SKIDATA Vario Gate reader. The stadium is one of the few arenas in the world to use this type of readers. The biggest advantage of this device is the ability to control various types of tickets (e.g. the traditional paper cards, magnetic cards, as well as MMS tickets in mobile phones.) The reader has a color screen, which may display messages to fans entering the venue. The same equipment is being installed in the parking lot, allowing the fans to move around the stadium with only one card. The club also plans to introduce a non-cash payment system, which will accelerate the speed of making various purchases around the stadium.

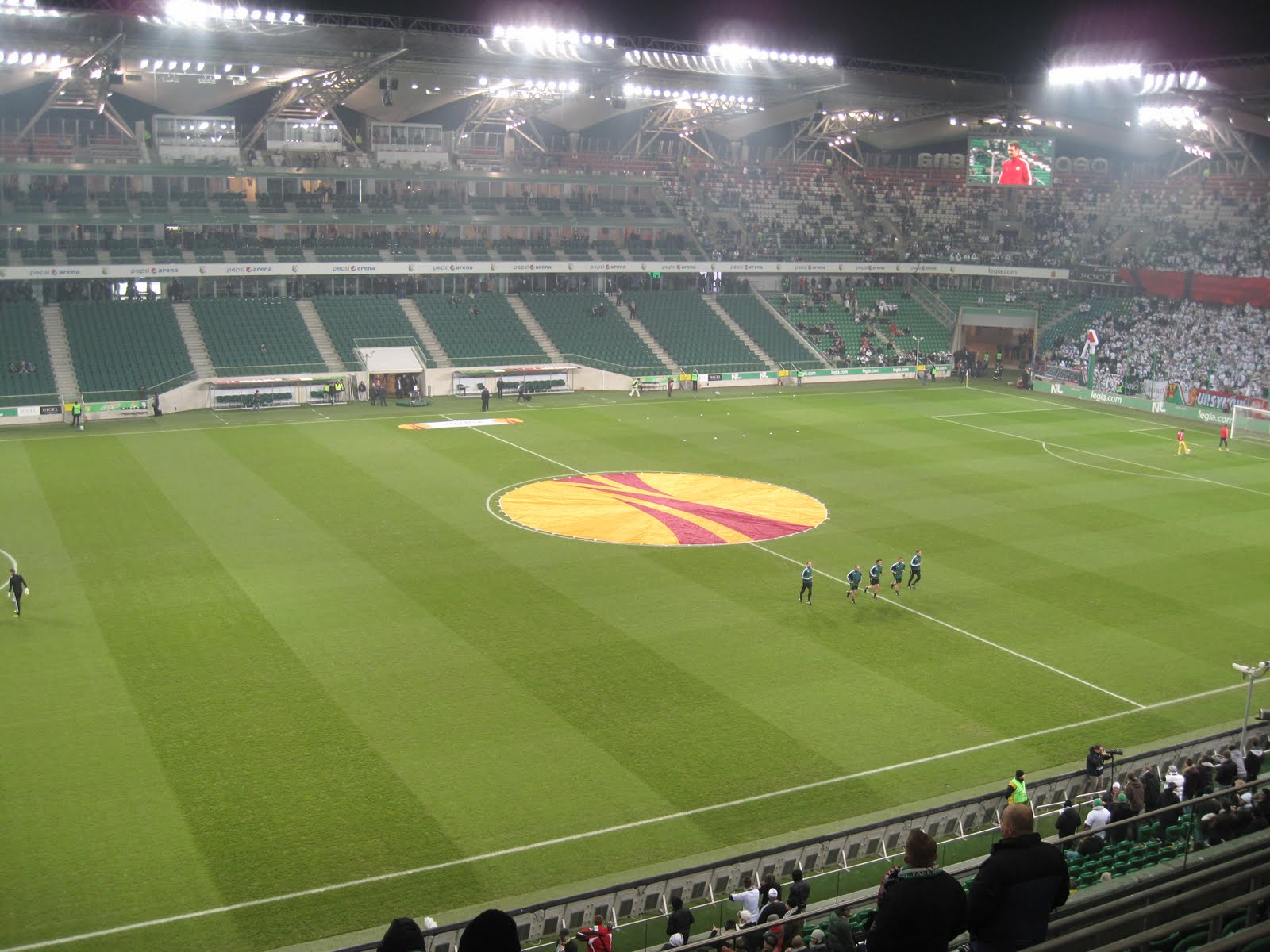
Main stand before UEFA Europa League match between Legia Warsaw and PSV Eindhoven

==== Lighting system ====
The stadium's lighting system is divided into several separate sections: lighting of the space under the grandstands, promenade illumination, spectator's stand lighting, and finally illumination of the pitch itself.

The illumination of the pitch is 2000 lux (power 516 kW), which enables the transmission of matches in the HD technology.

The illumination system located in front of the stadium's promenade allows for effective and multi-colored lighting of the outer parts of the stands and the roof structure.

== Facilities ==
=== Promenade ===
The stadium has four entrances, two on Łazienkowska Street and two on Kanał Piaseczyński. They lead to the promenade, from which the fans may access the stands. The promenade is located approximately 6 meters above street level. The promenade includes catering facilities and toilets. It is the main route between different sections of a particular stand. Fans may not access other stands through the promenade.

=== Museum ===
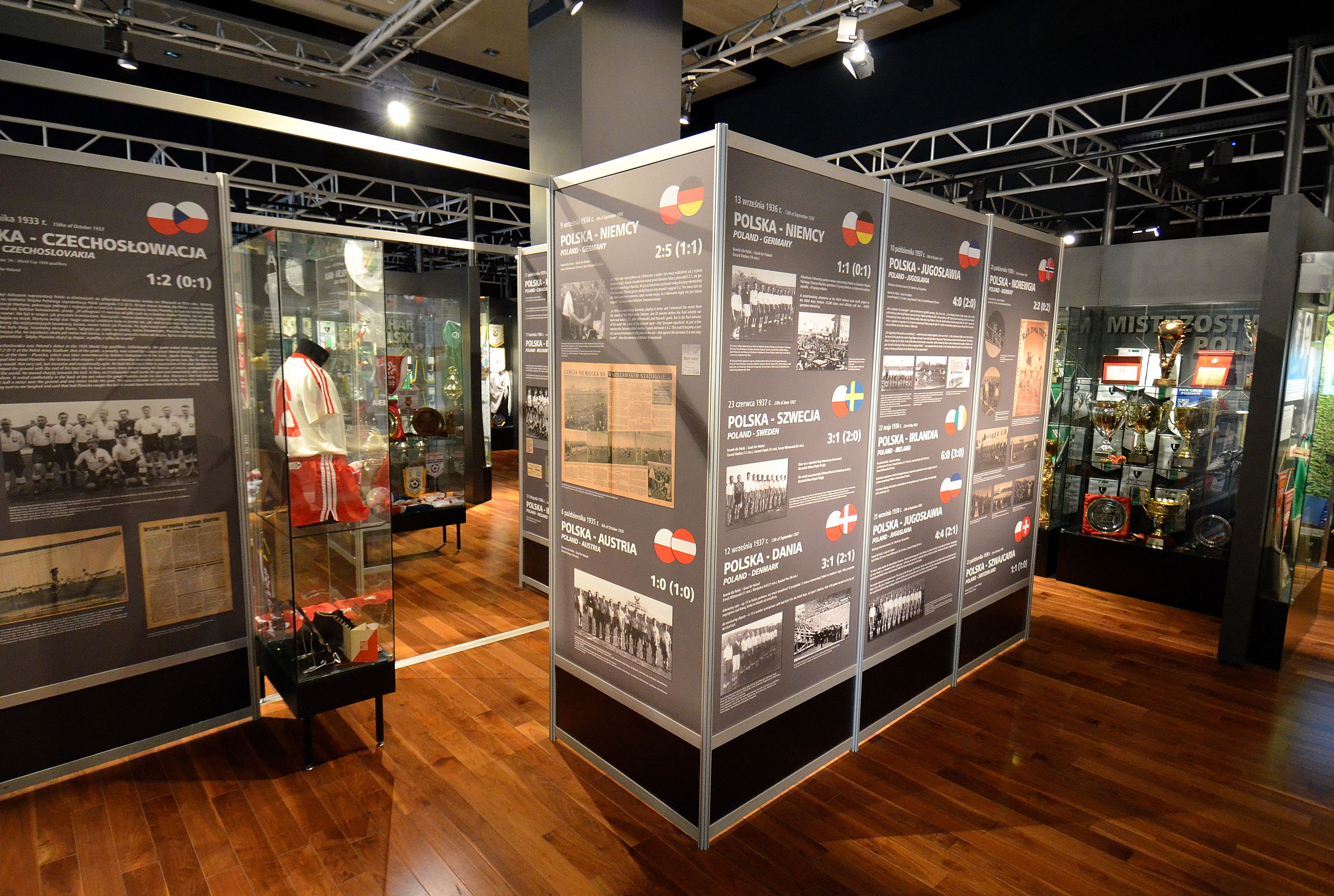
Interior of Legia Warsaw museum located underneath the north stand

The Legia club museum is located within the north stand. It was established with the cooperation of Legia supporters, in particular with its current custodian - Wiktor Bołba. The concept of the museum is to guide visitors through all the periods of club's history. The museum hosts temporary exhibitions commemorating important events in the club's history. It was opened on October 23, 2010 - the 63rd anniversary of Kazimierz Deyna's birth.

=== Bar & Restaurant ===
The Sports Bar & Restaurant "Łazienkowska 3" is located within the north stand (under the famous "Żyleta"). The facility is open not only during the games but also during the week. Inside the restaurant, there are TV screens, where sports events are broadcast. It was opened on 7 August 2010 before the inaugural match against Arsenal F.C.

=== TV Studio ===
The TV studio is located in the south-west corner of the stadium, on the second level of the stands. It is suitable for hosting various kinds of presentations and conferences. Within the studio, the stadiums operational centre is located, where the sound system, lighting and monitoring systems are managed.

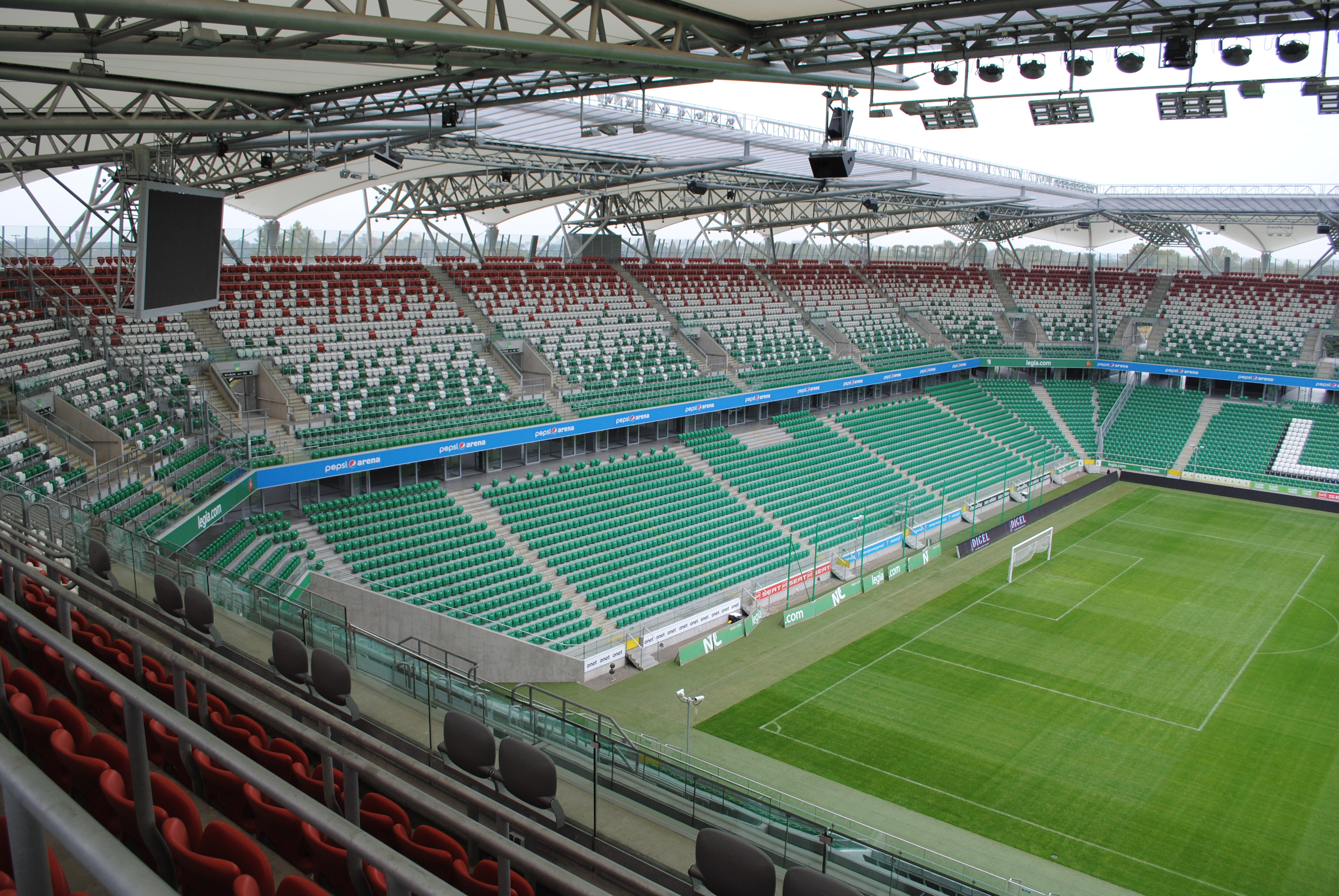
The north stand of the stadium – the famous Żyleta

=== Parking ===
Inside the stadium there is a two-level car park. It is located at the back of the southern, eastern, and northern stands. The first level accommodates 387 vehicles, the second level 392. Moreover, in front of the main grandstand there are spaces for 18 cars (a VIP section). In total, the stadium offers 797 parking spaces. The entrance to the car park is located in the north-east corner of the stadium, and a separate entrance dedicated to team buses is in the north-west corner.

== Naming rights ==
Between 2011 and early 2015 the stadium was officially known as Pepsi Arena on the basis of a sponsorship agreement with PepsiCo.

Currently the stadium naming rights are not commercially exploited.

== Żyleta ==
Żyleta (Polish pronunciation: [ʐɨˈlɛta], English: the Razor) is a common name for the northern stand in the Polish Army Stadium in Warsaw, Poland, traditionally occupied by the most spontaneous and fanatical fans of the Legia Warsaw football club. Before the stadium's renovation (2008–2011), the “old” Żyleta referred only to the central section of the eastern stand of the stadium (occasionally, it would also refer to eastern stand as a whole). There is a special exhibition dedicated to the "old" Żyleta in the Legia club museum. Today, after the stadium renovation, the “new” Żyleta means the whole northern stand of stadium (located behind the goal). Capacity of the stand is 7,477 spectators.

== Kazimierz Deyna monument ==
Kazimierz Deyna monument is a statue dedicated to one of the most famous Legia players in the club history. The monument is located just in front of the entrance to the Żyleta stand in the north-east corner of the stadium. An official committee was founded by fans and people related to the club to finalize the project named Let’s built a monument for Deyna. There was a competition launched to design Deyna's monument. The winner was a project designed by Tomasz Radziewicz. The design was selected via an Internet poll, and many different actions have been undertaken by fans to raise money for this monument. The 3.2 m-tall (10 ft) statue was cast from bronze and it is situated on a small illuminated socle. The official unveiling ceremony took place on 6 June 2012.

Kazimierz Deyna is one of Poland's most decorated footballers, having won 97 caps and scored 41 goals for the white and reds (the national team). A gold medal winner at the 1972 Munich Olympics (and top scorer with nine goals), he was also part of the third-placed Polish team at the 1974 World Cup in West Germany, before winning the silver medal with the national side at the 1976 Summer Olympics. It was in 1974 that he was ranked third in the European Footballer of the Year list, behind Dutch great Johan Cruyff and West Germany captain Franz Beckenbauer. He died in a car accident in San Diego, California, aged just 41 in September 1989.

== Poland national team matches ==
In the past, the old Legia Stadium was used many times as a venue for the Poland national football team, especially during the 1930s and 1990s. Since the reconstruction, the national team has played six matches at the stadium. Five of them were friendlies.

Nr	Competition	Date	Opponent	Attendance	Result	Scorers for Poland
1.	Friendly	5 June 2011	Argentina	12,000	2–1	Adrian Mierzejewski, Paweł Brożek
2.	Friendly	9 June 2011	France	30,000	0–1	–
3.	Friendly	2 September 2011	Mexico	18,000	1–1	Paweł Brożek
4.	Friendly	2 June 2012	Andorra	26,000	4–0	Ludovic Obraniak, Robert Lewandowski, Jakub Błaszczykowski, Marcin Wasilewski
5.	2022 FIFA World Cup qualification	28 March 2021	Andorra	0 (Note: Match without audience participation, due to restrictions related to the COVID-19 pandemic in Poland.)	3–0	Robert Lewandowski (2), Karol Świderski
6.	Friendly	16 November 2022	Chile	28,000	1–0	Krzysztof Piątek

== See also ==
- Józef Piłsudski
- List of football stadiums in Poland
- Lists of stadiums
