= Rodrigo Soares =

Brazilian footballer

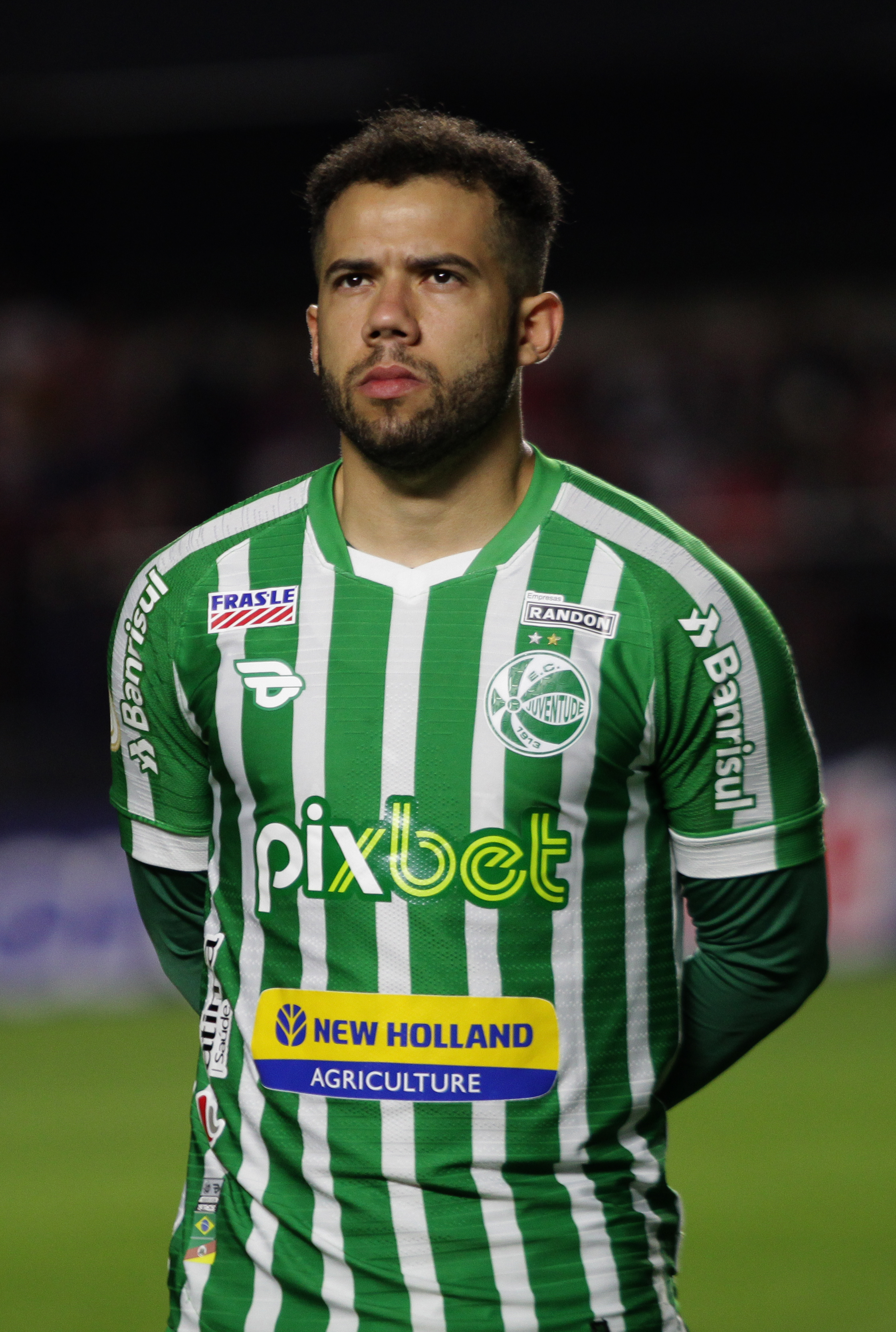

Personal information
- Full name: Rodrigo Alves Soares
- Date of birth: 26 December 1992 (age 33)
- Place of birth: Porangatu, Brazil
- Height: 1.76 m (5 ft 9 1/2 in)
- Position: Right back

Team information
- Current team: Goiás
- Number: 2

Senior career*
Years	Team	Apps	(Gls)
2012	União São João	14	(2)
2013	Santo André	1	(0)
2014–2015	Grêmio Anápolis	15	(1)
2015–2017	Porto B	25	(0)
2017	→ Chaves (loan)	7	(0)
2017–2019	Desportivo das Aves	60	(5)
2019–2022	PAOK	44	(0)
2022–2023	Juventude	45	(1)
2023–2024	Atlético Goianiense	36	(3)
2024–2025	Novorizontino	79	(0)
2026–	Goiás	42	(0)
- * Club domestic league appearances and goals as of 17 November 2026

Rodrigo Alves Soares (born 26 December 1992) is a Brazilian professional footballer who plays as a right back for Goiás.

== Club career ==
=== Early career ===
Born on 26 December 1992 in Porangatu, Brazil, Rodrigo Alves Soares played football from a young age. He was introduced to professional football at the age of 20, at União São João. He joined Santo André for a while, before signing for Grêmio Anápolis. With 14 matches and 1 goal in 2014–15, he moved to play in Europe. He moved to Porto and played for their B team for two seasons. In 2017, he was loaned to Chaves for half a season, recording his first appearances in Primeira Liga. In the following season, Rodrigo was on the lookout for a top-tier team that would grant him opportunities to show his worth. Desportivo das Aves gave him this chance.

=== C.D. Aves ===
In his first season at Desportivo das Aves, Rodrigo conjured up 1 goal and 2 assists in 33 encounters and contributed to his club's first ever silverware, the Taça de Portugal. The Brazilian had made his first step, but would definitely stand out in 2018–19.

He played in 41 matches, scored 4 goals, delivered 9 assists, got the award for Primeira Liga best full-back of the season and earned numerous awards on European level as well. His excellent season attracted interest from Porto and Sporting, but he ended up at PAOK.

=== PAOK ===
He signed a three year contract with Greek champions PAOK for an undisclosed fee. A free agent after his contract with Desportivo Aves reached its completion, the 26-year-old defender initially held negotiations with AEK Athens, but he subsequently spoke with PAOK and made the decision to join the Thessaloniki-based club. After a good season in 2021-22 campaign and the departure of Matos, Rodrigo become a first team player under Pablo Garcia and won another title in his career. In Cup final PAOK faced Olympiacos and won 2–1. In the last year in his contract and PAOK, in January 2022, decided to release Rodrigo under new technical director Jose Boto. He made 64 appearances across all competitions for PAOK and scored 1 goal against Lamia FC.

=== Return to Brazil ===
In January 2022 Rodrigo signed a deal with Juventude for one year. Then in January 2023 he moved to Atlético Goianiense. After a year there he moved to Novorizontino.

== Career statistics ==
=== Club ===
As of 2 September 2023

Club	Season	League			Cup (Note: Includes Taça de Portugal and Copa do Brasil)		Continental		Other		Total	
Club	Season	Division	Apps	Goals	Apps	Goals	Apps	Goals	Apps	Goals	Apps	Goals
União São João	2012	Série C	12	2	—		—		—		12	2
Santo André	2013	Série D	1	0	—		—		—		1	0
Grêmio Anápolis	2014	Campeonato Goiano	10	0	—		—		—		10	0
Grêmio Anápolis	2015	Campeonato Goiano	5	1	—		—		—		5	1
Grêmio Anápolis	Total		15	1	0	0	0	0	—		15	1
Porto B	2015–16	LigaPro	16	0	—		—		—		16	0
Porto B	2016–17	LigaPro	9	0	—		—		—		9	0
Porto B	Total		25	0	0	0	0	0	—		25	0
Chaves (loan)	2016–17	Primeira Liga	7	0	1	0	—		—		8	0
Desportivo das Aves	2017–18	Primeira Liga	27	1	5	0	—		1 (Note: Appearance(s) in Taça da Liga)	0	33	1
Desportivo das Aves	2018–19	Primeira Liga	33	4	3	0	—		5	0	41	4
Desportivo das Aves	Total		60	5	8	0	0	0	6	0	74	5
PAOK	2019–20	Super League	14	0	4	0	1 (Note: Appearance(s) in UEFA Champions League)	0	—		19	0
PAOK	2020–21	Super League	22	0	6	1	6 (Note: One appearance in UEFA Champions League, five appearances in UEFA Europa League)	0	—		34	1
PAOK	2021–22	Super League	8	0	—		3 (Note: Appearance(s) in UEFA Conference League)	0	—		11	0
PAOK	Total		44	0	10	1	10	0	—		64	1
Juventude	2022	Série A	35	1	3	0	—		10 (Note: Appearance(s) in Campeonato Gaúcho)	0	48	1
Atlético Goianiense	2023	Série B	15	2	2	0	—		15 (Note: Appearance(s) in Campeonato Goiano)	1	32	3
Career total			214	11	24	1	10	0	31	1	279	13

== Honours ==
=== Club ===
Porto B

- LigaPro: 2015–16

C.D. Aves

- Taça de Portugal: 2017–18

PAOK

- Greek Cup: 2020–21

Individual

- Primeira Liga Defender of the Month: April 2019
