= 2021–22 OFI Crete F.C. season =

OFI Crete F.C.
2021–22 season
- Owner: Michael Bousis
- President: Michael Bousis
- Head coach: Nikos Nioplias
- Stadium: Theodoros Vardinogiannis Stadium
- Super League 1: 8th
- Greek Cup: Round of 16
- Top goalscorer: League: Juan Neira (6); All: Juan Neira (6)
| Home colours | Away colours | Third colours |

The 2021–22 OFI Crete F.C. season was the club's 97th season in existence and the fourth consecutive season in the top flight of Greek football. In addition to the domestic league, OFI participated in this season's edition of the Greek Football Cup. The season covered the period from 1 July 2021 to 30 June 2022.

== Players ==
=== First-team squad ===
As of 23 February 2022

Note: Flags indicate national team as defined under FIFA eligibility rules; some limited exceptions apply. Players may hold more than one non-FIFA nationality.

| No. | Pos. | Nation | Player |
|---|---|---|---|
| 1 | GK | CMR | Devis Epassy |
| 2 | DF | SYR | Abdul Rahman Weiss |
| 3 | DF | GRE | Odysseas Lymperakis |
| 4 | DF | GRE | Triantafyllos Pasalidis |
| 5 | DF | LUX | Vahid Selimović |
| 6 | DF | GRE | Nikos Marinakis |
| 7 | MF | GRE | Lazaros Lamprou (on loan from PAOK) |
| 8 | MF | ARG | Juan Neira |
| 9 | FW | NED | Mike van Duinen |
| 10 | MF | GRE | Giannis Bouzoukis |
| 11 | MF | AUS | Bruce Kamau |
| 13 | GK | GRE | Vasilios Sifakis |
| 14 | DF | GRE | Praxitelis Vouros |
| 15 | DF | GRE | Apostolos Diamantis |
| 17 | FW | GRE | Fiorin Durmishaj |

| No. | Pos. | Nation | Player |
|---|---|---|---|
| 18 | DF | GRE | Kostas Giannoulis (third-captain) |
| 19 | MF | GRE | Kosmas Tsilianidis |
| 21 | MF | ESP | Jon Toral |
| 24 | GK | NED | Boy Waterman |
| 26 | MF | GRE | Paschalis Staikos |
| 28 | FW | BRA | Luiz Phellype (on loan from Sporting CP) |
| 29 | MF | ARG | Miguel Mellado |
| 30 | FW | NED | Luc Castaignos |
| 32 | GK | GRE | Dimitrios Sotiriou (vice-captain) |
| 33 | MF | NED | Jonathan de Guzmán |
| 34 | DF | GRE | Nikos Korovesis (captain) |
| 35 | GK | GRE | Christos Mandas |
| 38 | MF | GRE | Konstantinos Balogiannis |
| 44 | MF | GRE | Nikos Chalkiadakis |
| 45 | MF | GRE | Giannis Apostolakis |

== Pre-season and friendlies ==
Win Draw Loss

| 13 July 2021 Friendly | Vitesse | 2–1 | OFI | Netherlands |
| 18:00 CEST |

| 16 July 2021 Friendly | Anderlecht | 1–1 | OFI | Brussels, Belgium |
| 12:00 CEST (UTC+2) | Dauda 63' | | Korovesis 80' | Stadium: Constant Vanden Stock Stadium |

| 21 July 2021 Friendly | Fortuna Sittard | 1–1 | OFI | Netherlands |
| 18:00 CEST |

| 28 July 2021 Friendly | AZ | 2–0 | OFI | Dirkshorn, Netherlands |
| 16:00 CEST | Guðmundsson 8'; Berkhout 58' | Report | | Stadium: Sportpark vv Dirkshorn |

| 30 July 2021 Friendly | N.E.C. | 2–0 | OFI | Nijmegen, Netherlands |
| 19:00 CEST | Bruijn 12' (pen.); Márquez 52' | | Balogiannis (yellow card) 17'; De Guzmán (yellow card) 55' | Stadium: Goffertstadion |

== Competitions ==
=== Overview ===
| Competition | First match | Last match | Starting round | Final position | Record | | | | | | | |
| Competition | First match | Last match | Starting round | Final position | Pld | W | D | L | GF | GA | GD | Win % |
|---|---|---|---|---|---|---|---|---|---|---|---|---|
| Super League 1 | 13 September 2021 | 14 May 2022 | Matchday 1 | 8th | 33 | 11 | 11 | 11 | 40 | 45 | −5 | 33.33 |
| Greek Football Cup | 28 October 2021 | 22 December 2021 | Fifth round | Round of 16 | 3 | 1 | 0 | 2 | 2 | 5 | −3 | 33.33 |
| Total | | | | | 36 | 12 | 11 | 13 | 42 | 50 | −8 | 33.33 |

Source: Soccerway

=== Super League 1 ===
==== League table ====
| Pos | Team | Pld | W | D | L | GF | GA | GD | Pts | Qualification |
|---|---|---|---|---|---|---|---|---|---|---|
| 5 | Panathinaikos | 26 | 13 | 3 | 10 | 41 | 21 | +20 | 42 | Qualification for the Play-off round |
| 6 | PAS Giannina | 26 | 11 | 7 | 8 | 28 | 24 | +4 | 40 | Qualification for the Play-off round |
| 7 | OFI | 26 | 9 | 10 | 7 | 33 | 32 | +1 | 37 | Qualification for the Play-out round |
| 8 | Asteras Tripolis | 26 | 10 | 5 | 11 | 27 | 29 | −2 | 35 | Qualification for the Play-out round |
| 9 | Panetolikos | 26 | 9 | 5 | 12 | 27 | 39 | −12 | 32 | Qualification for the Play-out round |

Source: Super League Greece
Rules for classification: 1) Points; 2) Head-to-head points; 3) Head-to-head goal difference; 4) Goal difference; 5) Goals scored; 6) Play-offs (neutral ground).
(Note: Criteria 6 is only used if needed to decide champion, teams for relegation or teams for UEFA competitions).

==== Results summary ====
| Overall | | | | | | | | Home | | | | | | Away | | | | | |
| Pld | W | D | L | GF | GA | GD | Pts | W | D | L | GF | GA | GD | W | D | L | GF | GA | GD |
|---|---|---|---|---|---|---|---|---|---|---|---|---|---|---|---|---|---|---|---|
| 26 | 9 | 10 | 7 | 33 | 32 | +1 | 37 | 5 | 5 | 3 | 20 | 19 | +1 | 4 | 5 | 4 | 13 | 13 | 0 |

Last updated: 6 March 2022.
Source: Super League

===== Results by matchday =====
| Matchday | 1 | 2 | 3 | 4 | 5 | 6 | 7 | 8 | 9 | 10 | 11 | 12 | 13 | 14 | 15 | 16 | 17 | 18 | 19 | 20 | 21 | 22 | 23 | 24 | 25 | 26 |
|---|---|---|---|---|---|---|---|---|---|---|---|---|---|---|---|---|---|---|---|---|---|---|---|---|---|---|
| Ground | A | H | H | A | H | A | H | A | H | A | H | H | A | H | A | A | H | A | H | A | H | A | H | A | A | H |
| Result | D | D | D | D | L | W | D | D | W | W | W | L | W | D | W | L | W | L | L | L | W | D | W | D | L | W |
| Position | 5 | 9 | 8 | 9 | 9 | 7 | 8 | 7 | 6 | 4 | 4 | 5 | 6 | 6 | 6 | 6 | 5 | 6 | 7 | 8 | 8 | 8 | 6 | 7 | 8 | 7 |

Source: Super League
A = Away; H = Home; W = Win; D = Draw; L = Loss

=== Play out round ===
| Pos | Team | Pld | W | D | L | GF | GA | GD | Pts | ION | OFI | AST | VOL | PNE | ATR | LAM | APS |
|---|---|---|---|---|---|---|---|---|---|---|---|---|---|---|---|---|---|
| 7 | Ionikos | 33 | 12 | 9 | 12 | 44 | 42 | +2 | 45 | — | — | — | 2–2 | 3–1 | — | — | 5–1 |
| 8 | OFI | 33 | 11 | 11 | 11 | 40 | 45 | −5 | 44 | 2–3 | — | 1–0 | — | 0–1 | — | — | 1–2 |
| 9 | Asteras Tripolis | 33 | 11 | 8 | 14 | 33 | 37 | −4 | 41 | 2–3 | — | — | — | — | 0–0 | 0–2 | 2–2 |
| 10 | Volos | 33 | 10 | 10 | 13 | 47 | 48 | −1 | 40 | — | 5–0 | 0–2 | — | — | 1–1 | 3–0 | — |
| 11 | Panetolikos | 33 | 10 | 7 | 16 | 32 | 48 | −16 | 37 | — | — | 0–0 | 0–0 | — | 2–3 | 1–2 | — |

Source: Super League Greece
Legend: Blue = home team win; Yellow = draw; Red = away team win.
Rules for classification: 1) Points; 2) Head-to-head points (Regular season and play-out); 3) Head-to-head goal difference (Regular season and play-out); 4) Regular season position.

==== Results summary ====
| Overall | | | | | | | | Home | | | | | | Away | | | | | |
| Pld | W | D | L | GF | GA | GD | Pts | W | D | L | GF | GA | GD | W | D | L | GF | GA | GD |
|---|---|---|---|---|---|---|---|---|---|---|---|---|---|---|---|---|---|---|---|
| 6 | 2 | 1 | 3 | 7 | 8 | −1 | 7 | 1 | 0 | 3 | 4 | 6 | −2 | 1 | 1 | 0 | 3 | 2 | +1 |

Last updated: 8 May 2022.
Source: Super League

==== Results by matchday ====
| Play-outs Μatchday | 1 | 2 | 3 | 4 | 5 | 6 | 7 |
|---|---|---|---|---|---|---|---|
| Ground | H | A | H | A | H | H | A |
| Result | L | W | L | D | L | W | |
| Position | 8 | 7 | 7 | 7 | 7 | 7 | |

Updated to match(es) played on 8 May 2022. Source: Super League
A = Away; H = Home; W = Win; D = Draw; L = Loss

==== Matches ====
| 19 March 2022 1 | OFI | 2–3 | Ionikos | Heraklion |
| 15:00 EET | | | | Stadium: Theodoros Vardinogiannis Stadium |

| 9 April 2022 3 | OFI | 1–2 | Apollon Smirnis | Heraklion |
| 18:15 EET | | | | Stadium: Theodoros Vardinogiannis Stadium |

| 17 April 2022 4 | Atromitos | 1–1 | OFI | Peristeri |
| 15:30 EET | | | | Stadium: Peristeri Stadium |

| 30 April 2022 5 | OFI | 0–1 | Panaitolikos | Heraklion |
| 17:30 EET | | | | Stadium: Theodoros Vardinogiannis Stadium |

| 8 May 2022 6 | OFI | 1–0 | Asteras Tripolis | Heraklion |
| 16:00 EET | | | | Stadium: Theodoros Vardinogiannis Stadium |

| 14 May 2022 7 | Volos | v | OFI | Volos |
| 17:00 EET | | | | Stadium: Panthessaliko Stadium |

=== Greek Football Cup ===
==== Fifth Round ====
| 28 October 2021 | Acheron Kanallaki | 0–1 | OFI | Preveza |
| 21:30 EEST | | Report | Castaignos 25' (pen.) | Stadium: Preveza Municipal Stadium; Referee: Athanasios Tzilos (Larissa) |

==== Round of 16 ====
| 1 December 2021 First leg | Aris | 3–1 | OFI | Thessaloniki |
| 17:00 EET | Gama 16' (pen.); Kamara 45' (pen.); Sasha (yellow card) 54'; Leismann (yellow card) 73'; Iturbe 90'; Sundgren (yellow card) 90' | Report | Vouros (yellow card) 14'; Castaignos 56'; Giannoulis (yellow card) 90'; Balogiannis (yellow card) 90'; Mellado (yellow card) 90' | Stadium: Kleanthis Vikelidis Stadium; Referee: Vasilios Fotias (Pella) |

| 22 December 2021 Second leg | OFI | 0–2 (1–5 agg.) | Aris | Heraklion, Crete |
| 15:00 EET | Mellado (red card) 45'; Giannoulis (yellow card) 45'; Toral (yellow card) 60'; Balogiannis (yellow card) 90' | Report | Leismann (yellow card) 13'; Gama 49' (pen.); Kamara (yellow card) 51', (goal) 81' | Stadium: Theodoros Vardinogiannis Stadium; Referee: Alexandros Tsakalidis (Chalkidiki) |
