= 2020–21 OFI Crete F.C. season =

OFI
2020–21 season
- Owner: Michael Bousis
- President: Michael Bousis
- Head coach: Georgios Simos (until 6 March 2021); Nikos Nioplias (from 8 March 2021)
- Stadium: Theodoros Vardinogiannis Stadium
- Super League 1: 12th
- Greek Cup: Sixth round
- Europa League: Second qualifying round
- Top goalscorer: League: Fabio Sturgeon (5); All: Fabio Sturgeon; Adrián Sardinero (5)
Home colours	Away colours	Third colours

The 2020–21 season was OFI's 96th season in existence and the third consecutive season in the top flight of Greek football. They participated in the Super League Greece, the Greek Cup and the UEFA Europa League. The season covered the period from 20 July 2020 to 30 June 2021.

== Players ==
=== First-team squad ===
As of 21 October 2020

Note: Flags indicate national team as defined under FIFA eligibility rules; some limited exceptions apply. Players may hold more than one non-FIFA nationality.

No.	Pos.	Nation	Player
2	DF	GRE	Abdul Rahman Weiss
3	DF	GRE	Odysseas Lymperakis
4	MF	NOR	Vajebah Sakor (fourth-captain)
5	DF	LUX	Vahid Selimović
6	DF	GRE	Nikos Marinakis
7	MF	POR	Fábio Sturgeon
8	MF	ARG	Juan Neira
9	FW	BRA	Felipe Souza
10	MF	ENG	Adil Nabi
11	FW	ARG	Nazareno Solís (on loan from Boca Juniors)
13	DF	GRE	Nikos Vafeas
14	DF	GRE	Praxitelis Vouros
15	DF	GRE	Apostolos Diamantis
16	MF	GRE	Konstantinos Balogiannis
17	FW	GRE	Vangelis Nikokyrakis
18	DF	GRE	Kostas Giannoulis (third-captain)

No.	Pos.	Nation	Player
19	MF	GRE	Kosmas Tsilianidis
20	FW	AUS	Apostolos Giannou
21	MF	POR	Ricardo Vaz
22	MF	ESP	Adrián Sardinero
23	FW	GRE	Alexandros Gargalatzidis
24	GK	NED	Boy Waterman
26	MF	GRE	Paschalis Staikos
28	MF	GRE	Frixos Grivas
29	MF	ARG	Miguel Mellado
30	FW	NED	Luc Castaignos
32	GK	GRE	Dimitris Sotiriou (vice-captain)
33	MF	NED	Jonathan de Guzmán
34	DF	GRE	Nikos Korovesis (captain)
38	MF	GRE	Theodoros Mingos
49	MF	GRE	Giorgos Sournakis
53	GK	GRE	Vasilis Sifakis

== Transfers ==
=== In ===
No.	Pos	Player	Transferred from	Fee	Date	Source
15			TBD		1 July 2020	

=== Out ===
No.	Pos	Player	Transferred to	Fee	Date	Source
15			TBD		1 July 2020	

== Pre-season and friendlies ==
Win Draw Loss

26 August 2020 Friendly	Panathinaikos	1–0	OFI	Athens, Greece
21:00 EEST	Macheda 41'	Report		Stadium: Olympic Stadium

5 September 2020 Friendly	OFI	0−2	Ergotelis	Heraklion, Crete, Greece
20:00 EEST		Report	Manousakis 7', 41' (pen.)	Stadium: Theodoros Vardinogiannis Stadium; Referee: Petros Tsagkarakis (Chania)

== Competitions ==
=== Overview ===
Competition	First match	Last match	Starting round	Final position	Record							
Competition	First match	Last match	Starting round	Final position	Pld	W	D	L	GF	GA	GD	Win %
Super League 1	12 September 2020	8 May 2021	Matchday 1	12th	33	8	8	17	30	47	−17	24.24
Greek Football Cup	20 January 2021	4 February 2021	Sixth round	Sixth round	2	0	1	1	1	3	−2	0.00
Europa League	17 September 2020		Second qualifying round	Second qualifying round	1	0	0	1	0	1	−1	0.00
Total					36	8	9	19	31	51	−20	22.22

Last updated: 8 May 2021
Source: Competitions

=== Super League 1 ===
==== League table ====
Pos	Team	Pld	W	D	L	GF	GA	GD	Pts	Qualification
10	Atromitos	26	6	10	10	24	35	−11	28 (Note: Head to head points: Apollon 4, Atromitos 1.)	Qualification for the Play-out round
11	Lamia	26	5	8	13	14	38	−24	23	Qualification for the Play-out round
12	Panetolikos	26	4	8	14	13	32	−19	20	Qualification for the Play-out round
13	OFI	26	5	4	17	22	43	−21	19	Qualification for the Play-out round
14	AEL	26	3	7	16	18	42	−24	16	Qualification for the Play-out round

Source: Super League Greece
Rules for classification: 1) Points; 2) Head-to-head points; 3) Head-to-head goal difference; 4) Goals scored; 5) Goals against.

==== Results summary ====
Overall								Home						Away					
Pld	W	D	L	GF	GA	GD	Pts	W	D	L	GF	GA	GD	W	D	L	GF	GA	GD
26	5	4	17	22	43	−21	19	2	3	8	12	24	−12	3	1	9	10	19	−9

Last updated: 14 March 2021.
Source: Super League

===== Results by matchday =====
Matchday	1	2	3	4	5	6	7	8	9	10	11	12	13	14	15	16	17	18	19	20	21	22	23	24	25	26
Ground	H	A	H	A	H	A	A	H	A	H	H	A	H	A	H	A	H	A	H	H	A	H	A	A	H	A
Result	D	W	D	L	D	L	L	L	W	W	L	W	L	L	W	D	L	L	L	L	L	L	L	L	L	L
Position	2	6	6	7	7	8	10	10	9	9	9	7	8	9	8	8	9	9	9	9	11	11	11	11	13	13

Source: Super League
A = Away; H = Home; W = Win; D = Draw; L = Loss

=== Play out round ===
Pos	Team	Pld	W	D	L	GF	GA	GD	Pts	Qualification or relegation	VOL	ATR	PAS	LAM	APS	OFI	PNE	AEL
10	Lamia	33	8	11	14	21	42	−21	35		1–1	—	—	—	—	0–2	—	0–0
11	Apollon Smyrnis	33	9	7	17	29	40	−11	34		0–0	—	—	0–1	—	0–0	—	0–2
12	OFI	33	8	8	17	30	47	−17	32		—	1–1	2–1	—	—	—	2–2	—
13	Panetolikos (O)	33	6	10	17	20	44	−24	28	Qualification for the relegation play-offs	—	1–3	—	0–3	1–0	—	—	—
14	AEL (R)	33	6	9	18	25	47	−22	27	Relegation to Super League 2	—	—	2–0	—	—	0–1	1–1	—

Source: Superleague Greece, Soccerway
Rules for classification: 1) Points; 2) Head-to-head points (Regular season and play-out); 3) Head-to-head goal difference (Regular season and play-out); 4) Regular season position.
(O) Play-off winners; (R) Relegated

==== Results summary ====
Overall								Home						Away					
Pld	W	D	L	GF	GA	GD	Pts	W	D	L	GF	GA	GD	W	D	L	GF	GA	GD
7	3	4	0	8	4	+4	13	1	2	0	5	4	+1	2	2	0	3	0	+3

Last updated: 15 May 2021.
Source: Super League

==== Results by matchday ====
Play-outs Μatchday	1	2	3	4	5	6	7
Ground	A	H	A	H	A	A	H
Result	D	W	D	D	W	W	D
Position	13	12	12	12	12	12	12

Source: Super League
A = Away; H = Home; W = Win; D = Draw; L = Loss

=== Greek Football Cup ===
==== Sixth Round ====
20 January 2021 First leg	Volos	2–0	OFI	Volos
15:00 EET	Santos (yellow card) 43'; Martínez 52'; Barrientos (yellow card) 62'; Mitoglou 85'	Report	Neira (yellow card) 37'	Stadium: Panthessaliko Stadium; Attendance: Behind closed doors Referee: Georgios Vreskas (Pieria)

4 February 2021 Second leg	OFI	1–1 (1–3 agg.)	Volos	Heraklion, Crete
15:00 EET	Sardinero 12'; Mellado (yellow card) 40'; Neira (yellow card) 86'	Report	Douvikas 19'; Tekio (yellow card) 67'	Stadium: Theodoros Vardinogiannis Stadium; Attendance: Behind closed doors Referee: Evangelos Manouchos (Argolida)

=== UEFA Europa League ===
==== Second qualifying round ====
17 September 2020 Second qualifying round	OFI (Greece)	0–1	(Cyprus) Apollon Limassol	Heraklion, Crete, Greece
20:00 EEST	Giannoulis (yellow card) 17'; Neira (yellow card) 60'; Selimović (yellow card) 82'; Mellado (yellow card) 90+2'	Report	Denić (yellow card) 22'; Szalai 50'; Benschop (yellow card) 54'; Sachetti (yellow card) 85'	Stadium: Theodoros Vardinogiannis Stadium; Attendance: Behind closed doors Referee: Fabio Maresca (Italy)
