= 2022–23 OFI Crete F.C. season =

OFI Crete F.C.
2022–23 season
- Owner: Michael Bousis
- President: Michael Bousis
- Head coach: Nikos Nioplias (until 20 October); Valdas Dambrauskas (from 25 October)
- Stadium: Theodoros Vardinogiannis Stadium
- Super League 1: 7th
- Greek Cup: Fifth round
Home colours	Away colours	Third colours

The 2022–23 OFI Crete F.C. season was the club's 98th season in existence and the fifth consecutive season in the top flight of Greek football. In addition to domestic league, OFI participated in this season's editions of the Greek Cup. The season covers the period from 1 July 2022 to 30 June 2023.

== Players ==
=== First-team squad ===
As of 28 September 2022

Note: Flags indicate national team as defined under FIFA eligibility rules; some limited exceptions apply. Players may hold more than one non-FIFA nationality.

No.	Pos.	Nation	Player
1	GK	NED	Sonny Stevens
2	DF	SWE	Eric Larsson
4	DF	GRE	Triantafyllos Pasalidis
5	MF	SEN	Assane Dioussé
6	DF	GRE	Nikos Marinakis
7	FW	POR	Mesaque Djú
8	MF	ARG	Juan Neira
9	FW	ESP	Miguel Ángel Guerrero
10	MF	GRE	Giannis Bouzoukis
11	FW	MLI	Nouha Dicko
13	GK	GRE	Vasilios Sifakis
14	DF	GRE	Praxitelis Vouros (captain)
15	DF	GRE	Apostolos Diamantis
17	FW	GRE	Fiorin Durmishaj
18	DF	GRE	Kostas Giannoulis (third-captain)
19	MF	GRE	Kosmas Tsilianidis
20	DF	FRA	Samuel Yohou

No.	Pos.	Nation	Player
21	MF	ESP	Jon Toral
22	DF	ISL	Guðmundur Þórarinsson
23	MF	ESP	Luis Perea (on loan from Leganés)
26	MF	GRE	Paschalis Staikos
28	MF	GRE	Frixos Grivas
29	MF	ARG	Miguel Mellado
31	MF	AUS	Bruce Kamau
32	GK	GRE	Dimitrios Sotiriou (vice-captain)
35	GK	GRE	Christos Mandas
37	GK	GRE	Antonis Makatounakis (on loan from Darmstadt 98)
38	MF	GRE	Konstantinos Balogiannis
45	MF	GRE	Giannis Apostolakis
46	FW	GRE	Giannis Theodosoulakis
48	MF	KSA	Samer Al-Mohaimeed
77	FW	CGO	Thievy Bifouma
90	MF	ALG	Mehdi Zerkane (on loan from Bordeaux)

== Transfers ==
=== In ===
No.	Pos	Player	Transferred from	Fee	Date	Source
90	MF	(Algeria) Mehdi Zerkane	(France) Bordeaux	Loan	5 September 2022	

=== Out ===
No.	Pos	Player	Transferred to	Fee	Date	Source
15			TBD		1 July 2022	

== Pre-season and friendlies ==
Win Draw Loss

20 July 2022 Friendly	Utrecht	4–0	OFI	Utrecht, Netherlands
18:00 CEST (UTC+2)	Douvikas 9'; Veerman 29'; Redan 79', 90'			Stadium: Sportcomplex Zoudenbalch; Attendance: 1,000; Referee: Stan Teuben

26 July 2022 Friendly	Vitesse	1–2	OFI	Overbetuwe, Netherlands
19:00 CEST (UTC+2)	Frederiksen 74'	Report	Neira (red card); Tsilianidis 48'; Dioussé 52'	Stadium: RKSV Driel Stadion

29 July 2022 Friendly	Go Ahead Eagles	4–1	OFI	Deventer, Netherlands
19:00 CEST (UTC+2)		Report		Stadium: De Adelaarshorst

7 August 2022 Friendly	Asteras Tripolis	0–1	OFI	Volos
18:45 CEST (UTC+3)		Report		Stadium: Panthessaliko Stadium

9 August 2022 Friendly	Volos	2–1	OFI	Volos
21:00 CEST (UTC+3)		Report		Stadium: Panthessaliko Stadium

13 August 2022 Friendly	OFI	4–0	Episkopi	Heraklion
19:00 CEST (UTC+3)		Report		Stadium: Theodoros Vardinogiannis Stadium

3 December 2022 Friendly	OFI	1–1	Anderlecht	Heraklion
19:00 EET (UTC+2)		Report		Stadium: Theodoros Vardinogiannis Stadium

== Competitions ==
=== Overview ===
Competition	First match	Last match	Starting round	Final position	Record							
Competition	First match	Last match	Starting round	Final position	Pld	W	D	L	GF	GA	GD	Win %
Super League 1	20 August 2022	12 March 2023	Matchday 1	9th	26	6	8	12	23	34	−11	23.08
Play-out round	18 March 2023	13 May 2023	Matchday 27	7th	0	0	0	0	0	0	+0	—
Greek Football Cup	20 October 2022		Fifth round	Fifth round	1	0	0	1	0	1	−1	0.00
Total					27	6	8	13	23	35	−12	22.22

Source: Soccerway

=== Super League 1 ===
==== League table ====
Pos	Team	Pld	W	D	L	GF	GA	GD	Pts	Qualification or relegation
7	Panetolikos	26	7	8	11	26	38	−12	29 (Note: Head to head points: Panetolikos 4, Atromitos 1)	Qualification for the Play-out round
8	Atromitos	26	7	8	11	25	29	−4	29	Qualification for the Play-out round
9	OFI	26	6	8	12	23	34	−11	26	Qualification for the Play-out round
10	Asteras Tripolis	26	4	13	9	19	30	−11	25	Qualification for the Play-out round
11	PAS Giannina	26	4	11	11	24	41	−17	23	Qualification for the Play-out round

Source: Super League Greece
Rules for classification: 1) Points; 2) Head-to-head points; 3) Head-to-head goal difference; 4) Goal difference; 5) Goals scored; 6) Play-offs (neutral ground).
(Note: Criterion 6 is only used if needed to decide champion, teams for relegation or teams for UEFA competitions).

==== Results summary ====
Overall								Home						Away					
Pld	W	D	L	GF	GA	GD	Pts	W	D	L	GF	GA	GD	W	D	L	GF	GA	GD
13	2	4	7	10	21	−11	10	1	2	4	5	10	−5	1	2	3	5	11	−6

Last updated: 14 November 2022.

==== Results by round ====
Round	1	2	3	4	5	6	7	8	9	10	11	12	13	14	15	16	17	18	19	20	21	22	23	24	25	26
Ground	A	H	A	H	H	A	H	A	H	A	H	A	H													
Result	L	L	W	L	D	L	L	D	D	D	L	L	W													
Position	11	14	10	11	10	11	11	11	11	12	14	14	10													

Updated to match(es) played on 14 November 2022. Source:
A = Away; H = Home; W = Win; D = Draw; L = Loss

==== Matches ====
18 March 2023 27	OFI	1–1	Levadiakos	Heraklion
				Stadium: Theodoros Vardinogiannis Stadium

1 April 2023 28	PAS Giannina	0–1	OFI	Ioannina
				Stadium: Zosimades Stadium

8 April 2023 29	OFI	4–1	Lamia	Heraklion
				Stadium: Theodoros Vardinogiannis Stadium

22 April 2023 30	OFI	1–1	Asteras Tripolis	Heraklion
				Stadium: Theodoros Vardinogiannis Stadium

29 April 2023 31	Atromitos	2–3	OFI	Peristeri
				Stadium: Peristeri Stadium

6 May 2023 32	OFI	2–2	Ionikos	Heraklion
				Stadium: Theodoros Vardinogiannis Stadium

13 May 2023 33	Panetolikos	0–2	OFI	Agrinio
				Stadium: Panetolikos Stadium

=== Greek Football Cup ===
==== Fifth Round ====
20 October 2022	A.E. Kifisia	1–0	OFI	Kaisariani
15:00 EEST	Kouiroukidis 64'	Report		Stadium: Michalis Kritikopoulos Stadium; Referee: Fotis Polychronis (Pieria)
