= 2017–18 Olympiacos F.C. season =

Olympiacos
2017–18 season
- Chairman: Evangelos Marinakis
- Manager: Besnik Hasi (8 June 2017 – 25 September 2017); Takis Lemonis (25 September 2017 − 4 January 2018); Óscar García (8 January 2018 − 3 April 2018); Christos Kontis
- Stadium: Karaiskakis Stadium, Piraeus
- Super League Greece: 3rd
- Greek Cup: Quarter-finals
- Champions League: Group stage
- Top goalscorer: League: Karim Ansarifard (17); All: Karim Ansarifard (18)
- Highest home attendance: 31,600
- Lowest home attendance: 15,177
- Average home league attendance: 19,806
Home colours	Away colours	Third colours

The 2017–18 season was Olympiacos's 59th consecutive season in the Super League Greece and their 92nd year in existence. Olympiacos finished 3rd in the league, stopping their 7-year run as champions. They also participated in the Greek Football Cup, where they reached the quarterfinals, and in the UEFA Champions League finishing 4th in the group stage, after managing to qualify during the summer qualification. There was also a record created for season tickets sold (over 21,000). For the first time since the 2009–10 season Olympiacos did not win any competition.

== Players ==
=== First team ===
As of 10 December 2017

Squad no.	Name	Nationality	Position(s)	Place of birth	Date of birth (age)	Previous club
Goalkeepers
1	Lefteris Choutesiotis	(Greece)	GK	Makrychori, Greece	20 July 1994 (23)	(Greece) Olympiacos U20
24	Silvio Proto	(Belgium)	GK	Charleroi, Belgium	23 May 1983 (34)	(Belgium) K.V. Oostende
99	Dimitris Skafidas	(Greece)	GK	Palaio Faliro, Greece	5 August 1999 (18)	(Greece) Olympiacos U20
Defenders
3	Alberto Botía	(Spain)	CB	Alquerías, Spain	27 January 1989 (28)	(Spain) Sevilla
20	Ehsan Hajsafi	(Iran)	LB	Kashan, Iran	25 February 1990 (27)	(Greece) Panionios
14	Omar Elabdellaoui	(Norway)	RB	Surnadal, Norway	5 December 1991 (26)	(England) Hull City
23	Leonardo Koutris	(Greece) (Brazil)	LB/LW	Rhodes, Greece	23 July 1995 (22)	(Greece) PAS Giannina
26	Jagoš Vuković	(Serbia)	CB/LB	Bačko Dobro Polje, Titov Vrbas, SFR Yugoslavia	10 June 1988 (29)	(Turkey) Konyaspor
40	Björn Engels	(Belgium)	CB	Kaprijke, Belgium	15 September 1994 (23)	(Belgium) Club Brugge
43	Dimitris Nikolaou	(Greece)	CB/LB	Euboea, Greece	13 August 1998 (19)	(Greece) Olympiacos U20
66	Pape Abou Cissé	(Senegal)	CB	Pikine, Senegal	14 September 1995 (22)	(France) Ajaccio
77	Diogo Figueiras	(Portugal)	RB	Castanheira do Ribatejo, Portugal	1 July 1991 (26)	(Spain) Sevilla
Midfielders
4	Alaixys Romao	(Togo) (France)	CM	L'Haÿ-les-Roses, France	18 January 1984 (33)	(France) Marseille
6	Panagiotis Tachtsidis	(Greece)	CM	Nafplio, Greece	15 February 1991 (26)	(Italy) Torino
7	Kostas Fortounis	(Greece)	AM	Trikala, Greece	16 October 1992 (25)	(Germany) Kaiserslautern
8	Vadis Odjidja-Ofoe	(Belgium) (Ghana)	CM/AM	Ghent, Belgium	21 February 1989 (28)	(Poland) Legia Warsaw
10	Marko Marin	(Germany)	AM/LW	Bosanska Gradiška, SFR Yugoslavia	13 March 1989 (28)	(England) Chelsea
13	Guillaume Gillet	(Belgium)	CM/RB	Liège, Belgium	9 March 1984 (33)	(France) Nantes
28	André Martins	(Portugal)	CM	Santa Maria da Feira, Portugal	21 January 1990 (27)	(Portugal) Sporting CP
32	Thanasis Androutsos	(Greece)	AM	Marousi, Greece	6 May 1997 (20)	(Greece) Olympiacos U20
Forwards
9	Uroš Đurđević	(Serbia)	ST	Belgrade, FR Yugoslavia	2 March 1994 (23)	(Serbia) Partizan
17	Karim Ansarifard	(Iran)	FW	Ardabil, Iran	3 April 1990 (27)	(Greece) Panionios
29	Emmanuel Emenike	(Nigeria)	ST	Otuocha, Aguleri, Nigeria	10 May 1987 (30)	(Turkey) Fenerbahçe
31	El Fardou Ben Nabouhane	(Comoros)	FW	Mayotte	10 June 1989 (28)	(Greece) Panionios
90	Felipe Pardo	(Colombia)	RW/CF	Quibdó, Colombia	17 August 1990 (27)	(France) Nantes
92	Sebá	(Brazil)	LW/CF	Salvador, Brazil	8 June 1992 (25)	(Portugal) Estoril

=== Out on loan ===
As of 28 December 2017

Name	Nationality	Position(s)	Date of birth (age)	To club	Notes
Iason Gavalas	(Greece)	GK	28 January 1998 (19)	(Greece) Kissamikos	
Manolis Saliakas	(Greece)	RB	12 September 1996 (20)	(Greece) Kissamikos	
Ardit Toli	(Albania)	RB/CB	12 July 1997 (20)	(Greece) Kissamikos	
Konstantinos Laifis	(Cyprus)	CB	19 May 1993 (24)	(Belgium) Standard Liège	with option to buy
Bruno Viana	(Brazil)	CB	5 February 1995 (22)	(Portugal) Braga	
Spyros Risvanis	(Greece)	CB	3 January 1994 (23)	(Greece) Atromitos	
Dimitrios Goutas	(Greece)	CB	4 April 1994 (23)	(Belgium) Sint-Truiden	
Antonis Karageorgis	(Greece)	CB	16 May 1997 (20)	(Greece) Kissamikos	
Konstantinos Tsimikas	(Greece)	LB	12 May 1996 (21)	(Netherlands) Willem II	
Antonis Fouasis	(Greece)	LB	13 June 1998 (19)	(Greece) Kissamikos	
Emmanouil Siopis	(Greece)	CM	14 May 1994 (23)	(Greece) Panionios	
Qazim Laçi	(Albania)	CM	19 January 1996 (21)	(France) AC Ajaccio	
Konstantinos Megaritis	(Greece)	CM/AM	10 January 1997 (20)	(Greece) Kissamikos	
Nicolás Martínez	(Argentina)	AM	25 September 1987 (29)	(Cyprus) Apollon Limassol	
Dimitris Tasioulis	(Greece)	AM	19 February 1997 (20)	(Greece) Kissamikos	
Giorgos Manthatis	(Greece)	RW	11 May 1997 (20)	(Greece) PAS Giannina	2-year loan
Giannis Gianniotas	(Greece)	RW	29 April 1993 (24)	(Spain) Real Valladolid	
Tarik Elyounoussi	(Norway)	FW	23 February 1988 (29)	(Azerbaijan) Qarabağ	
Anastasios Karamanos	(Greece)	FW	21 September 1990 (26)	(Portugal) Rio Ave	
Giorgos Xydas	(Greece)	FW	14 April 1997 (20)	(Greece) Kissamikos	
Nikos Vergos	(Greece)	ST	13 January 1996 (21)	(Hungary) Vasas	

== Transfers and loans ==
=== Transfers in ===
==== Summer 2017 ====
Note: Flags indicate national team as defined under FIFA eligibility rules; some limited exceptions apply. Players may hold more than one non-FIFA nationality.

No.	Pos.	Nation	Player
—	GK	BEL	Silvio Proto (from (Belgium) K.V. Oostende)
—	GK	GRE	Andreas Gianniotis (from (Greece) Panionios) (loan return)
—	DF	GRE	Spyros Risvanis (from (Greece) Panionios)
—	DF	GRE	Leonardo Koutris (from (Greece) PAS Giannina)
—	DF	SRB	Jagoš Vuković (from (Turkey) Konyaspor)
—	DF	CRO	Hrvoje Milić (from (Italy) Fiorentina)
—	DF	BEL	Björn Engels (from (Belgium) Club Brugge)
—	DF	GRE	Antonis Karageorgis (from (Greece) AEL Kalloni) (loan return)
—	DF	GHA	Mark Asigba (from (Greece) Veria) (loan return)
—	DF	GRE	Dimitrios Goutas (from (Belgium) Kortrijk) (loan return)
—	DF	GRE	Manolis Saliakas (from (Cyprus) Karmiotissa Pano Polemidion) (loan return)
—	DF	GRE	Epaminondas Pantelakis (from (Greece) Kissamikos) (loan return)
—	DF	GRE	Praxitelis Vouros (from (Greece) Levadiakos) (loan return)
—	DF	GRE	Konstantinos Tsimikas (from (Denmark) Esbjerg) (loan return)
—	DF	NOR	Omar Elabdellaoui (from (England) Hull City) (loan return)
—	DF	SEN	Pape Abou Cissé (from (France) Ajaccio) (loan return)
—	MF	GRE	Emmanouil Siopis (from (Greece) Panionios)

No.	Pos.	Nation	Player
—	MF	GRE	Panagiotis Tachtsidis (from (Italy) Torino)
—	MF	BEL	Vadis Odjidja-Ofoe (from (Poland) Legia Warsaw)
—	MF	BEL	Guillaume Gillet (from (France) Nantes)
—	MF	MAR	Mehdi Carcela (on loan from (Spain) Granada)
—	MF	GRE	Konstantinos Plegas (from (Greece) Panthrakikos) (loan return)
—	MF	GRE	Theofanis Tzandaris (from (Slovenia) Koper) (loan return)
—	MF	ALB	Qazim Laçi (from (Greece) Levadiakos) (loan return)
—	MF	ARG	Nicolás Martínez (from (Australia) Western Sydney Wanderers) (loan return)
—	MF	SRB	Saša Zdjelar (from (Spain) Mallorca) (loan return)
—	MF	SUI	Pajtim Kasami (from (England) Nottingham Forest) (loan return)
—	FW	NGR	Emmanuel Emenike (from (Turkey) Fenerbahçe)
—	FW	SRB	Uroš Đurđević (from (Serbia) Partizan)
—	FW	COL	Felipe Pardo (from (France) Nantes) (loan return)
—	FW	GRE	Giannis Gianniotas (from (Cyprus) APOEL) (loan return)
—	FW	GRE	Nikos Vergos (from (Spain) Real Madrid Castilla) (loan return)
—	FW	GRE	Anastasios Karamanos (from (Portugal) Feirense) (loan return)
—	FW	COM	El Fardou Ben Nabouhane (from (Greece) Panionios) (loan return)

=== Transfers out ===
==== Summer 2017 ====
Note: Flags indicate national team as defined under FIFA eligibility rules; some limited exceptions apply. Players may hold more than one non-FIFA nationality.

No.	Pos.	Nation	Player
6	DF	MAR	Manuel da Costa (transfer to (Turkey) Başakşehir)
8	MF	GRE	Andreas Bouchalakis (transfer to (England) Nottingham Forest)
9	FW	PAR	Óscar Cardozo (transfer to (Paraguay) Club Libertad)
10	MF	ARG	Alejandro Domínguez (released)
16	MF	GRE	Giorgos Manthatis (on loan to (Greece) PAS Giannina)
18	FW	NOR	Tarik Elyounoussi (on loan to (Azerbaijan) Qarabağ)
19	MF	ARG	Esteban Cambiasso (released)
21	MF	GRE	Emmanouil Siopis (on loan to (Greece) Panionios)
22	DF	FRA	Aly Cissokho (loan return to (England) Aston Villa)
24	DF	ESP	Alberto de la Bella (loan return to (Spain) Real Sociedad)
31	GK	ITA	Nicola Leali (loan return to (Italy) Juventus)
36	DF	BRA	Bruno Viana (on loan to (Portugal) Braga)
44	DF	ECU	Juan Carlos Paredes (loan return to (England) Watford)
45	DF	GRE	Panagiotis Retsos (transfer to (Germany) Bayer Leverkusen)
–	GK	GRE	Andreas Gianniotis (released)
–	GK	GRE	Iason Gavalas (on loan to (Greece) Kissamikos)
–	DF	GHA	Mark Asigba (transfer to (Greece) Lamia)
–	DF	GRE	Epaminondas Pantelakis (transfer to (Greece) Kissamikos)
–	DF	GRE	Dimitris Siovas (transfer to (Spain) Leganés, previously on loan)
–	DF	GRE	Konstantinos Tsimikas (on loan to (Netherlands) Willem II)

No.	Pos.	Nation	Player
–	DF	GRE	Antonis Fouasis (on loan to (Greece) Kissamikos)
–	DF	GRE	Dimitrios Goutas (on loan to (Belgium) Sint-Truiden)
–	DF	ALB	Ardit Toli (on loan to (Greece) Kissamikos)
–	DF	GRE	Spyros Risvanis (on loan to (Greece) Atromitos)
–	DF	GRE	Manolis Saliakas (on loan to (Greece) Kissamikos)
–	DF	GRE	Praxitelis Vouros (transfer to (Cyprus) APOEL)
–	DF	GRE	Antonis Karageorgis (on loan to (Greece) Kissamikos)
–	MF	GRE	Theofanis Tzandaris (released)
–	MF	GRE	Dimitris Kolovos (transfer to (Belgium) Mechelen, previously on loan)
–	MF	ALB	Qazim Laçi (on loan to (France) AC Ajaccio)
–	MF	GRE	Konstantinos Megaritis (on loan to (Greece) Kissamikos)
–	MF	GRE	Dimitris Tasioulis (on loan to (Greece) Kissamikos)
–	MF	GRE	Giannis Gianniotas (on loan to (Spain) Real Valladolid)
–	MF	GRE	Konstantinos Plegas (transfer to (Greece) Panionios)
–	MF	SUI	Pajtim Kasami (transfer to (Switzerland) Sion)
–	MF	ARG	Nicolás Martínez (on loan to (Cyprus) Apollon Limassol)
–	FW	GRE	Anastasios Karamanos (on loan to (Portugal) Rio Ave)
–	FW	GRE	Giorgos Xydas (on loan to (Greece) Kissamikos)
–	FW	GRE	Nikos Vergos (on loan to (Hungary) Vasas)

== Backroom staff ==
Coaching staff
Head coach	(Portugal) Pedro Martins (footballer)
Assistant coach	(Greece) Christos Kontis
Assistant coach	(Greece) Michalis Kavalieris
Goalkeeping coach	(Greece) Panagiotis Agriogiannis
Analyst
Analyst	(Greece) Giorgos Martakos
Analyst	(Greece) Giannis Vogiatzakis
Analyst	(Greece) Iosif Loukas
Fitness coach
Fitness coach	(Greece) Giannis Ntourountos
Rehabilitation coach
Rehabilitation coach	(Greece) Dimitris Bogatsiotis
Rehabilitation coach	(Greece) Zacharias Pasxalidis
Medical team
Head doctor	(Greece) Christos Theos
Head physio	(Greece) Dimitris Skordis
Physio	(Greece) Nikos Lykouresis
Physio	(Greece) Panagiotis Sivilias
Physio	(Greece) Tasos Pliagos
Nutritionist – Physiologist	(Greece) Maria Lykomitrou
Physiotherapist	(Greece) Aristeidis Chelioudakis

== Pre-season and friendlies ==
Win Draw Loss

23 June 2017 Friendly	Wattens	0–2	Olympiacos	Stans, Tyrol, Austria
18:00 (local)		Report	Vergos 28'; Megaritis 58'	Stadium: Sportplatz Stans

26 June 2017 Friendly	Ludogorets	1–1	Olympiacos	Jenbach, Tyrol, Austria
18:00 (local)	Marcelinho 44'	Report	Fortounis 34'	Stadium: Jenbach Stadion

2 July 2017 Friendly	Panionios	2–1	Olympiacos	Nea Smyrni, Athens, Greece
20:30	Yeşil 14'; Lamprou 59'	Report	Ansarifard 18'	Stadium: Nea Smyrni Stadium; Referee: Tsampouris

8 July 2017 Friendly	Mechelen	0–6	Olympiacos	Mechelen, Flemish Community, Belgium
18:00 (local)		Report	Elabdellaoui 11'; Botía 21'; Fortounis 38'; Marin 59'; Elyounoussi 74'; Ansarifard 81'	Stadium: AFAS Stadion

12 July 2017 Friendly	AZ	0–2	Olympiacos
17:30 (local)		Report	El Fardou Ben Nabouhane 60', 61' (pen.)

15 July 2017 Friendly	Lokeren	0–0	Olympiacos	Lokeren, Flemish Community, Belgium
18:00 (local)		Report		Stadium: Daknamstadion; Referee: Frederik Geldhof (Belgium)

19 July 2017 Friendly	Olympiacos	1–1	Asteras Tripolis	Piraeus, Greece
21:00	Carcela 55'	Report	Manias 29'	Stadium: Karaiskakis Stadium; Referee: Giorgos Tzovaras (Phthiotis)

9 August 2017 Friendly	Atromitos	1–0	Olympiacos	Peristeri, Greece
21:00	Chatziisaias 83'	Report		Stadium: Peristeri Stadium; Referee: Aristotelis Diamantopoulos

== Competitions ==
=== Overall ===
Competition	Started round	Current position / round	Final position / round	First match	Last match
Super League Greece	—	1st		19 August 2017	
Greek Cup	Group stage	Round of 16		19 September 2017	
UEFA Champions League	Third qualifying round	Group stage	Group stage	25 July 2017	5 December 2017

Updated to match played December 17, 2017
Source: Competitions

=== Overview ===
Competition	Record							
Competition	G	W	D	L	GF	GA	GD	Win %
Super League Greece	30	18	6	6	63	28	+35	60.00
Greek Cup	7	4	2	1	11	6	+5	57.14
UEFA Champions League	10	3	2	5	12	17	−5	30.00
Total	47	25	10	12	86	51	+35	53.19

Updated to match played 28 December 2017
Source: Competitions

=== Super League Greece ===
==== League table ====
Pos	Team	Pld	W	D	L	GF	GA	GD	Pts	Qualification or relegation
1	AEK Athens (C)	30	21	7	2	50	12	+38	70	Qualification for the Champions League third qualifying round
2	PAOK	30	21	4	5	59	19	+40	64 (Note: PAOK were deducted 3 points by court decision.)	Qualification for the Champions League second qualifying round
3	Olympiacos	30	18	6	6	63	28	+35	57 (Note: Olympiacos were deducted 3 points due to crowd behavior against AEK on 4 February 2018.)	Qualification for the Europa League third qualifying round
4	Atromitos	30	15	11	4	43	21	+22	56	Qualification for the Europa League second qualifying round
5	Asteras Tripolis	30	12	9	9	39	24	+15	45 (Note: Head-to-head points: Asteras Tripolis 2, Xanthi 2.)	Qualification for the Europa League second qualifying round

Source: Super League Greece
Rules for classification: 1) Points; 2) Head-to-head points; 3) Head-to-head goal difference; 4) Goals scored; 5) Goals against; 6) Play-offs (neutral ground); 7) Draw.
(Note: Criteria 6 is only used if needed to decide champion, teams for relegation or teams for UEFA competitions).
(C) Champions

==== Results summary ====
Overall								Home						Away					
Pld	W	D	L	GF	GA	GD	Pts	W	D	L	GF	GA	GD	W	D	L	GF	GA	GD
30	18	6	6	63	28	+35	60	11	2	2	34	10	+24	7	4	4	29	18	+11

Last updated: 6 May 2018.
Source: http://superleaguegreece.net

==== Results by matchday ====
Matchday	1	2	3	4	5	6	7	8	9	10	11	12	13	14	15	16	17	18	19	20	21	22	23	24	25	26	27	28	29	30
Ground	H	A	A	H	A	H	A	H	A	H	H	A	H	A	H	A	H	H	A	H	A	H	A	H	A	A	H	A	H	A
Result	W	W	D	D	L	L	W	W	L	W	W	W	W	W	W	W	W	W	D	L	D	W	W	D	W	D	W	L	W	L
Position	1	1	2	2	4	7	5	4	4	4	4	2	2	2	1	1	1	1	2	3	3	3	3	3	3	3	3	3	3	3

Source: http://superleaguegreece.net
A = Away; H = Home; W = Win; D = Draw; L = Loss

==== Matches ====
Win Draw Loss

19 August 2017 1	Olympiacos	4–1	Larissa	Piraeus
21:30	Fortounis 33' (pen.), 76'; Ansarifard 67'; Figueiras 74'	Report	Figueiras 71' (o.g.)	Stadium: Karaiskakis Stadium; Attendance: 0 (closed doors); Referee: Dimitrios Karantonis (Imathia)

26 August 2017 2	Lamia	0−1	Olympiacos	Peristeri^{[1]}
21:30		Report	Fortounis 29' (pen.)	Stadium: Peristeri Stadium; Attendance: 2,512; Referee: Alexandros Katsikogiannis (Epirus)

9 September 2017 3	Xanthi	1−1	Olympiacos	Xanthi
20:30	Lisgaras 43'	Report	Engels 12'	Stadium: Xanthi FC Arena; Attendance: 2,966; Referee: Charalambos Kalogeropoulos (Athens)

16 September 2017 4	Olympiacos	1−1	Asteras Tripolis	Piraeus
20:30	Manias 55' (pen.)	Report	Đurđević 90+4' (pen.)	Stadium: Karaiskakis Stadium; Attendance: 0 (closed doors); Referee: Aristomenis Koutsiautis (Arta)

24 September 2017 5	AEK Athens	3−2	Olympiacos	Athens
20:30	Christodoulopoulos 64', 80'; Mantalos 89'	Report	Marin 22'; Odjidja-Ofoe 46'	Stadium: Olympic Stadium; Attendance: 25,156; Referee: Anastasios Sidiropoulos (Dodecanese)

1 October 2017 6	Olympiacos	0−1	Atromitos	Piraeus
16:00		Report	Kivrakidis 60'	Stadium: Karaiskakis Stadium; Attendance: 19,592; Referee: Alexandros Aretopoulos (Trikala)

14 October 2017 7	Panionios	3−4	Olympiacos	Nea Smyrni
20:30	Spiridonović 3'; Masoud 83' (pen.); Durmishaj 84'	Report	Cissé 19'; Ansarifard 37', 45'; Fortounis 87' (pen.)	Stadium: Nea Smyrni Stadium; Attendance: 3,297; Referee: Angelos Evangelou (Athens)

22 October 2017 8	Olympiacos	1−0	PAOK	Piraeus
20:30	Engels 51'	Report		Stadium: Karaiskakis Stadium; Attendance: 30,250; Referee: Georgios Kominis (Thesprotia)

28 October 2017 9	Panathinaikos	1−0	Olympiacos	Athens
19:30	Villafáñez 56'	Report		Stadium: Leoforos Alexandras Stadium; Attendance: 13,715; Referee: Anastasios Papapetrou (Athens)

5 November 2017 10	Olympiacos	5−1	Platanias	Piraeus
15:00	Pardo 2', 90'; Botia 19'; Cissé 32'; Ansarifard 68' (pen.)	Report	Papanikolaou 88'	Stadium: Karaiskakis Stadium; Attendance: 18,340; Referee: Emmanouil Skoulas (Thessaly)

18 November 2017 11	Olympiacos	2−1	Levadiakos	Piraeus
19:30	Gillet 43'; Koutris 84'	Report	P. Giakoumakis 68'	Stadium: Karaiskakis Stadium; Attendance: 15,177; Referee: Aristotelis Diamantopoulos (Arcadia)

26 November 2017 12	Kassiopi	1−3	Olympiacos	Kerkyra
19:30	Gromitsaris 16'	Report	Cissé 46'; Đurđević 65'; Marin 68'	Stadium: Kerkyra Stadium; Attendance: 1,632; Referee: Praxitelis Zachariadis (Macedonia)

2 December 2017 13	Olympiacos	3−1	Apollon Smyrnis	Piraeus
19:30	Elabdellaoui 31'; Ansarifard 80', 90+4'	Report	Elbaz 31'	Stadium: Karaiskakis Stadium; Attendance: 15,670; Referee: Georgios Tzovaras (Phthiotis)

9 December 2017 14	Panetolikos	1−4	Olympiacos	Agrinio
19:30	Engels 27' (o.g.)	Report	Fortounis 6', 62'; Ansarifard 66'; Đurđević 90+1'	Stadium: Panetolikos Stadium; Attendance: 3,168; Referee: Ioannis Papadopoulos (Macedonia)

17 December 2017 15	Olympiacos	1−0	PAS Giannina	Piraeus
15:00	Marin 63'	Report		Stadium: Karaiskakis Stadium; Attendance: 18,235; Referee: Athanasios Tzilos (Larissa)

7 January 2018 16	Larissa	0−3	Olympiacos	Larissa
19:30		Report	Marin 54'; Ansarifard 68'; Đurđević 89'	Stadium: AEL FC Arena; Attendance: 7,499; Referee: Aristotelis Diamantopoulos (Arcadia)

15 January 2018 17	Olympiacos	2−0	Lamia	Piraeus
19:30	Marin 9'; Ansarifard 37'	Report		Stadium: Karaiskakis Stadium; Attendance: 16,532; Referee: Athanasios Sezos (Kilkis)

21 January 2018 18	Olympiacos	3−0	Xanthi	Piraeus
19:30	Ansarifard 26' (pen.), 57'; Fortounis 69'	Report		Stadium: Karaiskakis Stadium; Attendance: 19,823; Referee: Dimitrios Karantonis (Imathia)

28 January 2018 19	Asteras Tripolis	1−1	Olympiacos	Tripoli
19:30	Iglesias 21'	Report	Ansarifard 38' (pen.)	Stadium: Theodoros Kolokotronis Stadium; Attendance: 4,925; Referee: Praxitelis Zachariadis (Macedonia)

4 February 2018 20	Olympiacos	1−2	AEK Athens	Piraeus
19:30	Ansarifard 81'	Report	Chyhrynskyi 87'; Giakoumakis 90+4'	Stadium: Karaiskakis Stadium; Attendance: 31,231; Referee: Anastasios Papapetrou (Athens)

11 February 2018 21	Atromitos	2−2	Olympiacos	Peristeri
19:30	Vasilakakis 19'; Diguiny 66'	Report	Marin 28'; Hajsafi 90'	Stadium: Peristeri Stadium; Attendance: 1,747; Referee: Athanasios Tzilos (Larissa)

18 February 2018 22	Olympiacos	1−0	Panionios	Piraeus
19:30	Odjidja-Ofoe 49'	Report		Stadium: Karaiskakis Stadium; Attendance: 0 (closed doors); Referee: Ioannis Neofitiadis (Corinth)

25 February 2018 23	PAOK	0−3 (Awarded)	Olympiacos	Thessaloniki
19:30		Report		Stadium: Toumba Stadium; Attendance: 24,717; Referee: Alexandros Aretopoulos (Trikala)

4 March 2018 24	Olympiacos	1−1	Panathinaikos	Piraeus
19:30	Fortounis 62'	Report	Mounier 87'	Stadium: Karaiskakis Stadium; Attendance: 0 (closed doors); Referee: Angelos Evangelou (Athens)

11 March 2018 25	Platanias	0–4	Olympiacos	Platanias
15:00		Report	Romao 14'; Marin 24'; Mirallas 35' (pen.); Cissé 58'	Stadium: Perivolia Municipal Stadium; Attendance: 2,070; Referee: Georgios Tzovaras (Phthiotis)

17 March 2018 26	Levadiakos	1–1	Olympiacos	Livadeia
19:30	Niasse 4'	Report	Ansarifard 49'	Stadium: Levadia Municipal Stadium; Attendance: 1,744; Referee: Aristomenis Koutsiautis (Arta)

2 April 2018 27	Olympiacos	5–1	Kassiopi	Piraeus
19:30	Ansarifard 12'; Mirallas 45+2'; Fortounis 51'; Engels 71'; Vrousai 87'	Report	Epstein 27'	Stadium: Karaiskakis Stadium; Attendance: 11,345; Referee: Aristotelis Diamantopoulos (Arcadia)

22 April 2018 28	Apollon Smyrnis	1–0	Olympiacos	Athens
19:00	Albanis 1'	Report		Stadium: Georgios Kamaras Stadium; Attendance: 1,448; Referee: Alexandros Katsikogiannis (Epirus)

19 April 2018 29	Olympiacos	4–0	Panetolikos	Piraeus
19:00	Romao 25'; Fortounis 34'; Ansarifard 38', 46'	Report		Stadium: Karaiskakis Stadium; Attendance: 14,050; Referee: Georgios Tzovaras (Phthiotis)

6 May 2018 30	PAS Giannina	3–0	Olympiacos	Ioannina
19:00	Tzimopoulos 54'; Conde 61'; Higor Vidal 90+2'	Report		Stadium: Zosimades Stadium; Attendance: 2,592; Referee: Stefanos Koubarakis (Thrace)

^{1} (change of venue due to unavailability of the Lamia Municipal Stadium)

=== Greek Cup ===
==== Group stage ====
Pos	Team	Pld	W	D	L	GF	GA	GD	Pts	Qualification
1	Olympiacos	3	2	1	0	6	2	+4	7	Round of 16
2	Asteras Tripolis	3	2	0	1	6	3	+3	6	Round of 16
3	AO Chania−Kissamikos	3	1	1	1	3	3	0	4	
4	Acharnaikos	3	0	0	3	0	7	−7	0	

Source: epo.gr
Rules for classification: 1) points, 2) head-to-head points, 3) head-to-head goal difference, 4) head-to-head best offense, 5) overall goal difference, 6) overall best offense, 7) overall best defense

Win Draw Loss

19 September 2017 1	Olympiacos	2−1	Asteras Tripolis	Piraeus
20:30	Emenike 71' (pen.), 78'	Report	Tsoukalas 84'	Stadium: Karaiskakis Stadium; Referee: Ioannis Neofytiadis (Corinthia)

25 October 2017 2	Acharnaikos	0−3	Olympiacos	Nikaia ^{[1]}
15:00		Report	Gillet 9'; Martins 48'; Emenike 90+1'	Stadium: Neapoli Stadium; Referee: Andreas Gamaris (Athens)

29 November 2017 3	AO Chania−Kissamikos	1−1	Olympiacos	Chania
17:15	Apostolidis 68'	Report	Đurđević 30'	Stadium: Perivolia Municipal Stadium; Referee: Charalambos Sotiriadis (Lasithi)

^{1} (change of venue)

==== Round of 16 ====
20 December 2017 First leg	Platanias	0−2	Olympiacos	Platanias
17:15		Report	Botia 57'; Ansarifard 78'	Stadium: Perivolia Municipal Stadium; Referee: Alexandros Katsikogiannis (Epirus)

10 January 2018 Second leg	Olympiacos	2−0 (4−0 agg.)	Platanias	Piraeus
15:00	Sebá (yellow card) 65'; Đurđević 68', 90+2'	Report	Korovesis (yellow card) 44'; Oues (yellow card) 62'; Budnik (yellow card) 66' (yellow-red card); Ellong (yellow card) 74'; Pryndeta (yellow card) 76'	Stadium: Karaiskakis Stadium; Referee: Aristomenis Koutsiaftis (Arta)

==== Quarter-finals ====
24 January 2018 First leg	Olympiacos	0−0	AEK Athens	Piraeus
19:30	Romao (yellow card) 33'; Sebá (yellow card) 53'; Mirallas (yellow card) 59'; Cissé (yellow card) 88'	Report	Kone (yellow card) 31'; André Simões (yellow card) 53'; Araujo (yellow card) 59'; Livaja (yellow card) 67'	Stadium: Karaiskakis Stadium; Attendance: 30,000; Referee: Anastasios Sidiropoulos (Dodecanese)

7 February 2018 Second leg	AEK Athens	2–1 (2–1 agg.)	Olympiacos	Athens
19:30	Christodoulopoulos 57'; Araujo 73'	Report	Tachtsidis 83'	Stadium: Olympic Stadium; Attendance: 22,035; Referee: Georgios Kominis (Thesprotia)

=== UEFA Champions League ===
Win Draw Loss

==== Third qualifying round ====
25 July 2017 First leg	Partizan (Serbia)	1–3	(Greece) Olympiacos	Belgrade, Serbia
21:45 EEST	Tawamba 10'	Report	Ben Nabouhane 6', 56'; Emenike 90+1'	Stadium: Partizan Stadium; Attendance: 24,658; Referee: Davide Massa (Italy)

2 August 2017 Second leg	Olympiacos (Greece)	2–2 (5–3 agg.)	(Serbia) Partizan	Piraeus, Greece
21:45 EEST	Carcela 22'; Fortounis 51'	Report	Soumah 33'; Đurđević 85'	Stadium: Karaiskakis Stadium; Attendance: 23,854; Referee: Xavier Estrada Fernández (Spain)

==== Play-off round ====
16 August 2017 First leg	Olympiacos (Greece)	2–1	(Croatia) Rijeka	Piraeus, Greece
21:45 EEST	Odjidja-Ofoe 66'; Romao 90+3'	Report	Héber 42'	Stadium: Karaiskakis Stadium; Attendance: 21,352; Referee: Felix Zwayer (Germany)

22 August 2017 Second leg	Rijeka (Croatia)	0–1 (1–3 agg.)	(Greece) Olympiacos	Rijeka, Croatia
21:45 EEST		Report	Marin 25'	Stadium: Stadion Rujevica; Attendance: 8,105; Referee: Danny Makkelie (Netherlands)

==== Group stage ====
Pos	Team	Pld	W	D	L	GF	GA	GD	Pts	Qualification	BAR	JUV	SPO	OLY
1	(Spain) Barcelona	6	4	2	0	9	1	+8	14	Advance to knockout phase	—	3–0	2–0	3–1
2	(Italy) Juventus	6	3	2	1	7	5	+2	11	Advance to knockout phase	0–0	—	2–1	2–0
3	(Portugal) Sporting CP	6	2	1	3	8	9	−1	7	Transfer to Europa League	0–1	1–1	—	3–1
4	(Greece) Olympiacos	6	0	1	5	4	13	−9	1		0–0	0–2	2–3	—

Source: UEFA
Rules for classification: Group stage tiebreakers

12 September 2017 1	Olympiacos (Greece)	2−3	(Portugal) Sporting CP	Piraeus, Greece
21:45 EEST	Pardo 89', 90+3'	Report	Doumbia 2'; Gelson M. 13'; Fernandes 43'	Stadium: Karaiskakis Stadium; Attendance: 30,168; Referee: Viktor Kassai (Hungary)

27 September 2017 2	Juventus (Italy)	2−0	(Greece) Olympiacos	Turin, Italy
21:45 EEST	Higuaín 69'; Mandžukić 80'	Report		Stadium: Juventus Stadium; Attendance: 33,460; Referee: Tobias Stieler (Germany)

18 October 2017 3	Barcelona (Spain)	3−1	(Greece) Olympiacos	Barcelona, Spain
21:45 EEST	Nikolaou 18' (o.g.); Messi 61'; Digne 64'	Report	Nikolaou 90'	Stadium: Camp Nou; Attendance: 55,026; Referee: William Collum (Scotland)

31 October 2017 4	Olympiacos (Greece)	0−0	(Spain) Barcelona	Piraeus, Greece
21:45 EET		Report		Stadium: Karaiskakis Stadium; Attendance: 31,600; Referee: Anthony Taylor (England)

22 November 2017 5	Sporting CP (Portugal)	3−1	(Greece) Olympiacos	Lisbon, Portugal
21:45 EET	Dost 40', 66'; Bruno César 43'	Report	Odjidja-Ofoe 86'	Stadium: Estádio José Alvalade; Attendance: 42,528; Referee: Felix Zwayer (Germany)

5 December 2017 6	Olympiacos (Greece)	0−2	(Italy) Juventus	Piraeus, Greece
21:45 EET		Report	Cuadrado 15'; Bernardeschi 90'	Stadium: Karaiskakis Stadium; Attendance: 29,567; Referee: David Fernández Borbalán (Spain)

== Squad statistics ==
=== Appearances ===
Players with no appearances not included in the list.

As of match played 20 December 2017

No.	Pos.	Nat.	Name	Super League	Greek Cup	UCL	Total
No.	Pos.	Nat.	Name	Apps	Apps	Apps	Apps
1	GK	(Greece)	Lefteris Choutesiotis	0	1	0	1
3	DF	(Spain)	Alberto Botía	4(1)	1	3	8(1)
4	MF	(Togo)	Alaixys Romao	13	0	10	23
6	MF	(Greece)	Panagiotis Tachtsidis	7(1)	2(1)	3	12(2)
7	MF	(Greece)	Kostas Fortounis	11(1)	1	4(5)	16(6)
8	MF	(Belgium)	Vadis Odjidja-Ofoe	10(1)	0	9(1)	19(2)
9	FW	(Serbia)	Uroš Đurđević	4(6)	3	2(3)	9(9)
10	MF	(Germany)	Marko Marin	9(3)	2(1)	5(2)	16(6)
13	MF	(Belgium)	Guillaume Gillet	5(3)	3	5(1)	13(4)
14	DF	(Norway)	Omar Elabdellaoui	9	1	6	16
17	FW	(Iran)	Karim Ansarifard	8(3)	0(1)	0	8(4)
19	DF	(Croatia)	Hrvoje Milić	2	1(1)	0	3(1)
21	MF	(Greece)	Emmanouil Siopis	0(1)	0	1(1)	1(2)
23	DF	(Greece)	Leonardo Koutris	11	1	9	21
24	GK	(Belgium)	Silvio Proto	10	1	5	16
26	DF	(Serbia)	Jagoš Vuković	1	1(1)	2	4(1)
27	GK	(Greece)	Stefanos Kapino	5	2	5	12
28	MF	(Portugal)	André Martins	1(3)	3(1)	0	4(4)
29	FW	(Nigeria)	Emmanuel Emenike	2(3)	1(1)	1(2)	4(6)
31	FW	(Comoros)	Ben Nabouhane	2	1(1)	4(2)	7(3)
32	MF	(Greece)	Thanasis Androutsos	3(2)	3	1(1)	7(3)
33	MF	(Morocco)	Mehdi Carcela	4(2)	2	8	14(2)
40	DF	(Belgium)	Björn Engels	7(1)	2	5	14(1)
43	DF	(Greece)	Dimitris Nikolaou	2(2)	4	3	9(2)
44	MF	(Serbia)	Saša Zdjelar	2(2)	1(1)	2(3)	5(6)
45	DF	(Greece)	Panagiotis Retsos	2	0	4	6
56	DF	(Greece)	Stathis Lambrou	0	1	0)	1
66	DF	(Senegal)	Pape Abou Cissé	10	1(1)	0	11(1)
77	DF	(Portugal)	Diogo Figueiras	7(2)	3	6(1)	16(3)
80	FW	(Albania)	Marius Vrushaj	0	0(1)	0)	0(1)
90	FW	(Colombia)	Felipe Pardo	8(4)	2	3(5)	13(9)
92	FW	(Brazil)	Sebá	6(4)	0	4(3)	10(7)

=== Goalscorers ===
Includes all competitive matches.

As of match played 20 December 2017

Rank	Pos.	No.	Player	Super League	Greek Cup	Champions League	Total
1	FW	17	(Iran) Karim Ansarifard	7	1	0	8
2	MF	7	(Greece) Kostas Fortounis	6	0	1	7
3	MF	10	(Germany) Marko Marin	3	0	1	4
3	FW	9	(Serbia) Uroš Đurđević	3	1	0	4
3	FW	90	(Colombia) Felipe Pardo	2	0	2	4
3	FW	29	(Nigeria) Emmanuel Emenike	0	3	1	4
4	DF	66	(Senegal) Pape Abou Cissé	3	0	0	3
4	MF	8	(Belgium) Vadis Odjidja-Ofoe	1	0	2	3
5	DF	3	(Spain) Alberto Botia	1	1	0	2
5	MF	13	(Belgium) Guillaume Gillet	1	1	0	2
5	DF	40	(Belgium) Björn Engels	2	0	0	2
5	FW	31	(Comoros) Ben Nabouhane	0	0	2	2
6	DF	14	(Norway) Omar Elabdellaoui	1	0	0	1
6	MF	13	(Greece) Leonardo Koutris	1	0	0	1
6	MF	28	(Portugal) André Martins	0	1	0	1
6	DF	43	(Greece) Dimitris Nikolaou	0	0	1	1
6	DF	77	(Portugal) Diogo Figueiras	1	0	0	1
6	MF	4	(Togo) Alaixys Romao	0	0	1	1
6	MF	33	(Morocco) Mehdi Carcela	0	0	1	1
#	Own goals			0	0	0	0
Total				32	8	12	52

=== Disciplinary record ===
As of matches played 20 December 2017

No.	Pos.	Name	Super League		Greek Cup		UCL		Total	
No.	Pos.	Name	Yellow card	Red card	Yellow card	Red card	Yellow card	Red card	Yellow card	Red card
4	MF	Alaixys Romao	5	0	0	0	4	0	9	0
6	MF	Panagiotis Tachtsidis	4	0	1	0	1	0	6	0
7	MF	Kostas Fortounis	1	0	0	0	0	0	1	0
8	MF	Vadis Odjidja-Ofoe	4	0	0	0	2	0	6	0
9	FW	Uroš Đurđević	0	0	0	0	1	0	1	0
10	MF	Marko Marin	3	0	0	0	0	0	3	0
13	MF	Guillaume Gillet	3	0	0	0	1	0	4	0
14	DF	Omar Elabdellaoui	0	0	0	0	2	0	2	0
17	FW	Karim Ansarifard	1	0	0	0	0	0	1	0
19	DF	Hrvoje Milić	3	0	0	0	0	0	3	0
21	MF	Emmanouil Siopis	0	0	0	0	1	0	1	0
23	DF	Leonardo Koutris	1	0	0	0	2	0	3	0
24	GK	Silvio Proto	1	0	0	0	0	0	1	0
26	DF	Jagoš Vuković	0	0	1	0	0	0	1	0
27	GK	Stefanos Kapino	1	0	0	0	1	0	2	0
28	MF	André Martins	0	0	1	0	0	0	1	0
29	MF	Emmanuel Emenike	0	0	1	0	0	0	1	0
32	MF	Thanasis Androutsos	1	0	0	0	0	0	1	0
33	MF	Mehdi Carcela	0	0	1	0	1	0	2	0
40	DF	Björn Engels	0	1	0	0	1	0	1	1
43	DF	Dimitris Nikolaou	2	0	0	0	2	0	4	0
44	MF	Saša Zdjelar	1	0	0	0	0	0	1	0
45	DF	Panagiotis Retsos	1	0	0	0	1	0	2	0
66	DF	Pape Abou Cissé	5	0	0	0	0	0	5	0
77	DF	Diogo Figueiras	1	0	1	0	4	0	6	0
90	FW	Felipe Pardo	2	0	0	0	1	0	3	0
92	FW	Sebá	2	0	0	0	1	0	3	0
Total			42	1	6	0	26	0	74	1

== Individual Awards ==
Name	Pos.	Award
(Iran) Karim Ansarifard	Forward	Super League Greece Team of the Season
