= Apostolos Diamantis =

Greek footballer

Personal information
- Date of birth: 20 May 2000 (age 26)
- Place of birth: Serres, Greece
- Height: 1.87 m (6 ft 1 1/2 in)
- Position: Centre-back

Team information
- Current team: Hellas Syros
- Number: 67

Youth career
- 2006–2016: Panserraikos
- 2016–2018: PAOK

Senior career*
Years	Team	Apps	(Gls)
2018–2020	PAOK	0	(0)
2019–2020	→ Volos (loan)	15	(0)
2020–2023	OFI	76	(3)
2023	Istanbulspor	0	(0)
2023–2024	FC U Craiova	0	(0)
2024	Panserraikos	10	(0)
2024–2025	Iraklis	22	(1)
2025–2026	Anagennisi Karditsas	2	(0)
2026	Chania	11	(0)
2026–	Hellas Syros	3	(1)

International career^{‡}
2018	Greece U18	3	(0)
2018–2019	Greece U19	7	(1)
2019–2022	Greece U21	18	(1)
- * Club domestic league appearances and goals as of 19 September 2026 ‡ National team caps and goals as of 11 June 2022

Apostolos Diamantis (Greek: Απόστολος Διαμαντής; born 20 May 2000) is a Greek professional footballer who plays as a centre-back for Super League 2 club Hellas Syros.

== Career ==
Diamantis comes from the youth ranks of PAOK. On 24 June 2019, he joined newly promoted side Volos on a season-long loan.

=== OFI ===
On 23 August 2020, Diamantis signed a four-year contract with OFI on a free transfer. He made his official debut in a 2–1 away win against Lamia, on 20 September 2020.

At the end of the 2022–23 season it was announced that Diamantis would leave the club upon expiration of his contract, having agreed to join an unnamed European team. In his three seasons with the Cretan based club, he made 79 appearances and scored 3 goals.

=== Iraklis ===
On 22 August 2024, Diamantis moved to Iraklis on a one-year contract with an option for an additional season.

== Career statistics ==
As of 12 June 2025

Club	Season	League			Cup		Continental		Other		Total	
Club	Season	Division	Apps	Goals	Apps	Goals	Apps	Goals	Apps	Goals	Apps	Goals
Volos (loan)	2019–20	Super League Greece	15	0	3	0	—		—		18	0
OFI	2020–21	Super League Greece	30	0	1	0	0	0	—		31	0
OFI	2021–22	Super League Greece	16	1	1	0	—		—		17	1
OFI	2022–23	Super League Greece	30	2	1	0	—		—		31	2
OFI	Total		76	3	3	0	0	0	0	0	79	3
İstanbulspor	2023–24	Süper Lig	0	0	—		—		—		0	0
FC U Craiova	2023–24	Liga I	0	0	0	0	—		—		0	0
Panserraikos	2023–24	Super League Greece	10	0	1	0	—		—		11	0
Iraklis	2024–25	Super League Greece 2	22	1	0	0	—		—		22	1
Career total			123	4	7	0	0	0	0	0	130	4
