= Abdul Rahman Weiss =

Footballer (born 1998)

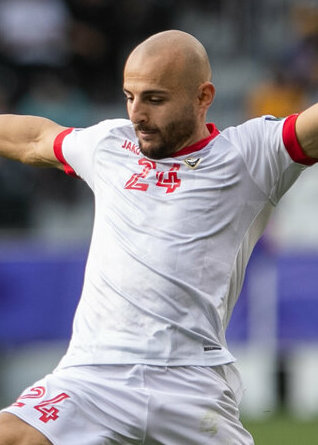
- Weiss with Syria at the 2023 Asian Cup

Personal information
- Full name: Abdul Rahman Weiss
- Date of birth: 14 June 1998 (age 28)
- Place of birth: Athens, Greece
- Height: 1.75 m (5 ft 9 in)
- Position: Right-back

Team information
- Current team: Anagennisi Karditsa
- Number: 2

Youth career
- –2014: Panathinaikos
- 2014–2016: Brentford
- 2016–2017: Platanias

Senior career*
Years	Team	Apps	(Gls)
2017–2020	Platanias	54	(2)
2020–2022	OFI	43	(0)
2022–2023	Volos	11	(0)
2023–2024	Athens Kallithea	21	(1)
2024–2025	Kalamata	23	(0)
2025–2026	Iraklis	13	(0)
2026–	Anagennisi Karditsa	1	(0)

International career^{‡}
2019–2020	Greece U21	5	(0)
2021–	Syria	23	(0)
- * Club domestic league appearances and goals as of 13:29, 9 September 2026 (UTC) ‡ National team caps and goals as of 11:36, 7 June 2026 (UTC)

Abdul Rahman Weiss (Note: Sometimes spelt Abdul Rahman Oues or in Greece as Ampntoul Rachman Oues.) (Arabic: عبدالرحمن ويس; Greek: Αμπντούλ Ραχμάν Ουές; born 14 June 1998) is a professional footballer who plays as a right-back for Super League Greece 2 club Anagennisi Karditsa. Born in Greece, he plays for the Syria national team.

Weiss is a product of the Panathinaikos and Brentford academies and came to prominence at Platanias. Following more than three years as a professional at the club, he later played for Greek clubs OFI, Volos, Kallithea, Kalamata and Iraklis. Weiss was capped by Greece at U21 level and Syria at full international level.

== Club career ==
=== Youth years ===
A right-back, Weiss began his career in the academy at Panathinaikos and spent the 2014–15 and 2015–16 seasons with Brentford Griffins, a community youth team of English club Brentford. He won two National League U19 Alliance titles with the team.

=== Platanias ===
In 2015, Weiss returned to Greece to join the academy at Platanias and progressed to sign a professional contract in February 2017. He was an unused substitute during a late-2016–17 season Super League match and broke into the team during the 2017–18 relegation season, in which he made 17 appearances. Weiss made 29 appearances and scored one goal during the 2018–19 season and was a part of the team which reached the Football League promotion playoffs. He was nominated for the Best Young Player award at the 2018–19 Football League Awards.

During a 2019–20 season affected by military service and the COVID-19 pandemic, Weiss made 16 appearances and scored one goal, before departing the club on 1 July 2020. He made 62 appearances and scored two goals during four years as a professional at the Perivolia Municipal Stadium.

=== OFI ===
On 8 January 2020, it was announced that Weiss had signed a pre-contract to join Super League club OFI on a four-year contract on 1 July 2020. During a 2020–21 season in which OFI narrowly avoided relegation, he made 34 appearances. During an injury-hit 2021–22 season, Weiss made 12 appearances and departed the club in August 2022. Weiss made 46 appearances during 2 1/2 years at the Theodoros Vardinogiannis Stadium.

=== Volos ===
On 18 August 2022, Weiss signed a two-year contract with Super League club Volos. He made 14 appearances prior to his contract being terminated by mutual consent on 19 January 2023.

=== Kallithea ===
On 20 January 2023, Weiss signed an 18-month contract with Super League Greece 2 club Athens Kallithea. He made 10 appearances and scored one goal during the remainder of a 2022–23 season in which the club narrowly missed promotion to the Super League. Weiss made just seven appearances during the first half of the 2023–24 season, before transferring to Persian Gulf Pro League club Nassaji Mazandaran in February 2024. Ultimately the transfer "could not be concluded due to procedural issues" and Weiss remained with Athens Kallithea. He made five appearances during the club's successful promotion playoff campaign and ended the 2023–24 season with 12 appearances in all competitions. Weiss was released when his contract expired and he ended his 18 months at the Grigoris Lamprakis Stadium with 23 appearances and one goal.

=== Kalamata ===
On 3 July 2024, Weiss signed a two-year contract with Super League Greece 2 club Kalamata on a free transfer. He made 25 appearances during a 2024–25 season in which the club narrowly missed promotion to the Super League Greece. Weiss departed the club in July 2025, after his contract was terminated by mutual consent.

=== Iraklis ===
On 29 July 2025, Weiss signed a one-year contract with Super League Greece 2 club Iraklis on a free transfer. Weiss made 17 appearances during the Super League Greece 2 North championship-winning 2025–26 season and was released when his contract expired.

=== Anagennisi Karditsa ===
On 25 August 2026, Weiss signed an undisclosed-length contract with Anagennisi Karditsa on a free transfer.

== International career ==
Weiss won five caps for the Greece U21 team and was part of the squad which failed to qualify for the 2021 UEFA European U21 Championship. He made his full international debut for Syria with starts in a pair of 2022 World Cup AFC third round qualifiers in September 2021. Weiss was a part of the Syria squad which qualified for the 2023 AFC Asian Cup and he started in each match during the team's run to the round-of-16.

== Personal life ==
Weiss was born in Athens and is of Syrian descent. In August 2019, he undertook military service.

== Career statistics ==
=== Club ===
As of match played 6 September 2026

Appearances and goals by club, season and competition
Club	Season	League			National cup (Note: Includes Greek Cup)		Europe		Other		Total	
Club	Season	Division	Apps	Goals	Apps	Goals	Apps	Goals	Apps	Goals	Apps	Goals
Platanias	2016–17	Super League Greece	0	0	0	0	―		―		0	0
Platanias	2017–18	Super League Greece	13	0	4	0	―		―		17	0
Platanias	2018–19	Football League Greece	27	1	0	0	―		2 (Note: Appearances in Football League promotion play-offs)	0	29	1
Platanias	2019–20	Super League Greece 2	14	1	2	0	―		―		16	1
Platanias	Total		54	2	6	0	―		2	0	62	2
OFI	2020–21	Super League Greece	31	0	2	0	1 (Note: Appearance in UEFA Europa League)	0	―		34	0
OFI	2021–22	Super League Greece	12	0	0	0	―		―		12	0
OFI	Total		43	0	2	0	1	0	―		46	0
Volos	2022–23	Super League Greece	11	0	3	0	―		―		14	0
Athens Kallithea	2022–23	Super League Greece 2 South	11	1	―		―		―		11	1
Athens Kallithea	2023–24	Super League Greece 2 South	5	0	2	0	―		5 (Note: Appearances in Super League Greece 2 South promotion play-offs)	0	12	0
Athens Kallithea	Total		16	1	2	0	―		5	0	23	1
Kalamata	2024–25	Super League Greece 2 South	23	0	2	0	―		―		25	0
Iraklis	2025–26	Super League Greece 2 North	13	0	4	0	―		―		17	0
Anagennisi Karditsa	2026–27	Super League Greece 2	1	0	0	0	―		―		1	0
Career total			161	3	19	0	1	0	7	0	188	3

=== International ===
As of match played 5 June 2026

Appearances and goals by national team and year
National team	Year	Apps	Goals
Syria	2021	4	0
Syria	2022	3	0
Syria	2023	6	0
Syria	2024	9	0
Syria	2026	1	0
Total		23	0

== Honours ==
Athens Kallithea

- Super League Greece 2 South promotion play-offs: 2024

Iraklis

- Super League Greece 2 North: 2025–26
