= Konstantinos Balogiannis =

Greek footballer (born 1999)

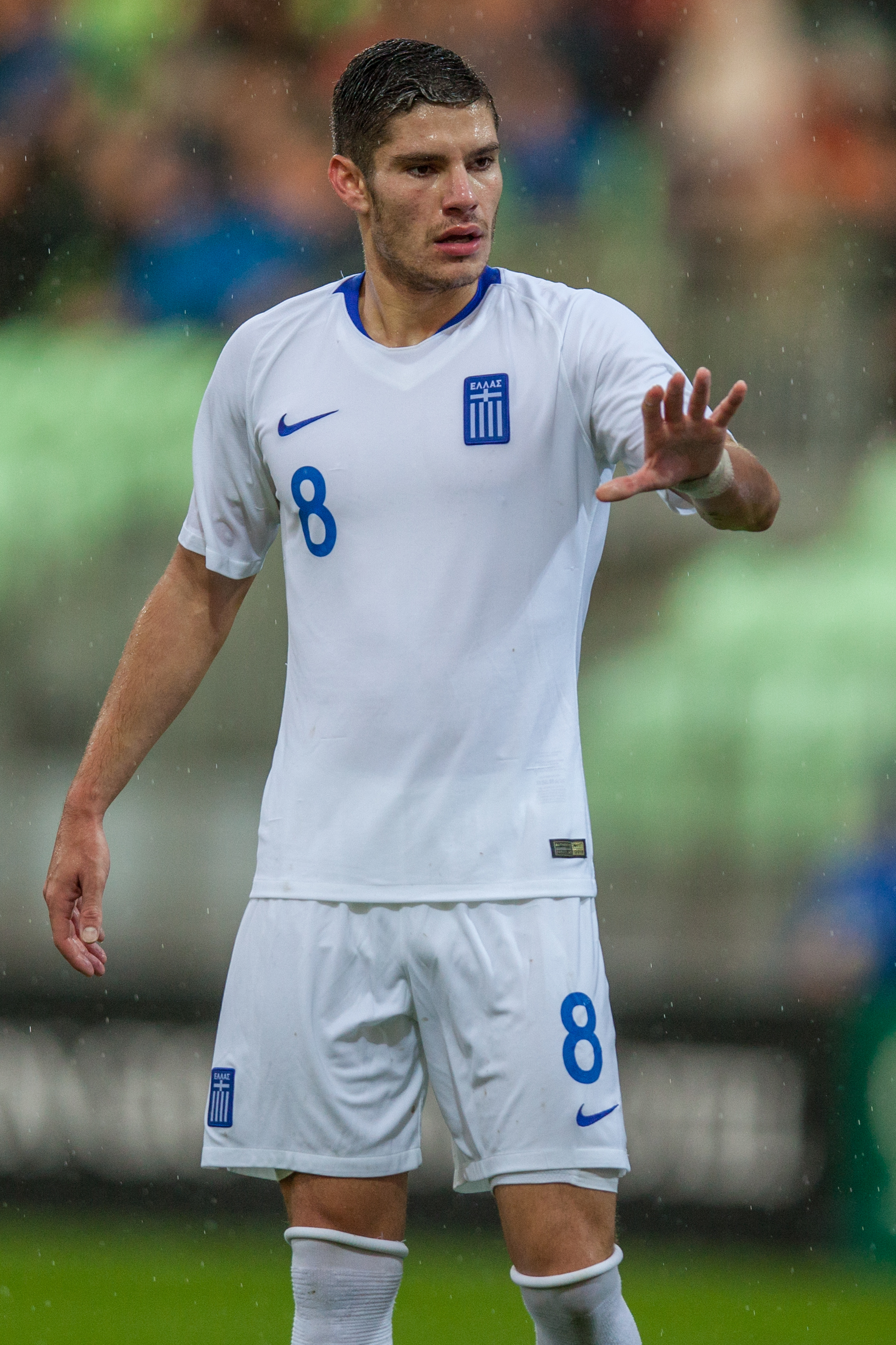
- Balogiannis with Greece in 2019

Personal information
- Full name: Konstantinos Balogiannis
- Date of birth: 8 February 1999 (age 27)
- Place of birth: Thessaloniki, Greece
- Height: 1.80 m (5 ft 11 in)
- Positions: Left-back; midfielder

Team information
- Current team: Apollon Limassol
- Number: 38

Youth career
- 2005–2011: PAOK
- 2011–2015: Arsenal
- 2015–2017: PEC Zwolle
- 2017–2018: PAOK

Senior career*
| Years | Team | Apps | (Gls) |
| 2018–2020 | PAOK | 0 | (0) |
| 2019–2020 | → Volos (loan) | 22 | (0) |
| 2020–2023 | OFI | 67 | (1) |
| 2023–2026 | Botev Plovdiv | 89 | (2) |
| 2026– | Apollon Limassol | 4 | (0) |

International career^{‡}
| 2018–2019 | Greece U19 | 2 | (0) |
| 2019–2020 | Greece U21 | 8 | (0) |
- * Club domestic league appearances and goals as of 6 October 2026 ‡ National team caps and goals as of 13 November 2020

Konstantinos Balogiannis (Greek: Κωνσταντίνος Μπαλογιάννης; born 8 February 1999) is a Greek professional footballer who plays as a left-back for Cypriot First Division club Apollon Limassol.

== Career ==
Balogiannis comes from the youth ranks of PAOK.

On 24 June 2019, Balogiannis along with two other PAOK players joined Volos on a season-long loan.

=== OFI ===
On 5 October 2020, Balogiannis joined OFI on a free transfer. At the end of the 2022–23 season he was offered a new contract, but failed to answer in time, thus ending his three-year spell with the club.

=== Botev Plovdiv ===
In July 2023, he signed a three-year contract with Bulgarian club Botev Plovdiv.

== Career statistics ==
As of match played 10 May 2026

| Club | Season | League | | | National cup (Note: Includes Greek Cup, Bulgarian Cup) | | Europe | | Other | | Total | |
| Club | Season | Division | Apps | Goals | Apps | Goals | Apps | Goals | Apps | Goals | Apps | Goals |
|---|---|---|---|---|---|---|---|---|---|---|---|---|
| PAOK | 2018–19 | Super League Greece | 0 | 0 | 1 | 0 | — | | — | | 1 | 0 |
| Volos (loan) | 2019–20 | Super League Greece | 22 | 0 | 4 | 0 | — | | — | | 26 | 0 |
| OFI | 2020–21 | Super League Greece | 16 | 0 | 1 | 0 | — | | — | | 17 | 0 |
| OFI | 2021–22 | Super League Greece | 28 | 0 | 2 | 0 | — | | — | | 30 | 0 |
| OFI | 2022–23 | Super League Greece | 23 | 1 | 1 | 0 | — | | — | | 24 | 1 |
| OFI | Total | | 67 | 1 | 4 | 0 | — | | — | | 71 | 1 |
| Botev Plovdiv | 2023–24 | Bulgarian First League | 30 | 2 | 6 | 0 | — | | — | | 36 | 2 |
| Botev Plovdiv | 2024–25 | Bulgarian First League | 34 | 0 | 2 | 0 | 6 | 0 | 1 | 0 | 43 | 0 |
| Botev Plovdiv | 2025–26 | Bulgarian First League | 23 | 0 | 2 | 0 | — | | — | | 25 | 0 |
| Botev Plovdiv | Total | | 87 | 2 | 10 | 0 | 6 | 0 | 1 | 0 | 104 | 2 |
| Career total | | | 176 | 3 | 19 | 0 | 6 | 0 | 1 | 0 | 202 | 3 |

== Honours ==
PAOK

- Greek Cup: 2018–19

Botev Plovdiv

- Bulgarian Cup: 2023–24
