= Jon Toral =

Spanish footballer

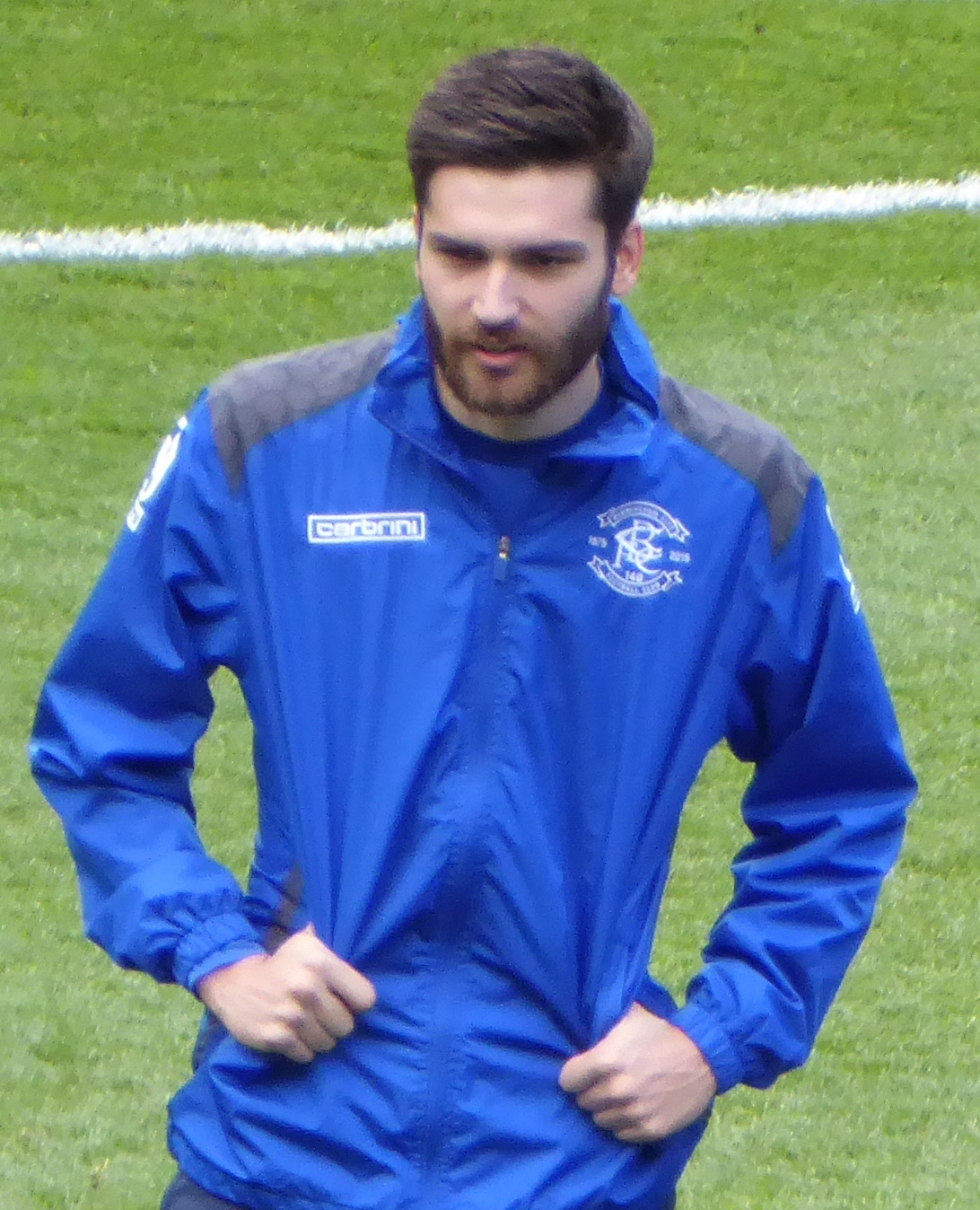
- Toral with Birmingham City in April 2016

Personal information
- Full name: Jon Miquel Toral Harper
- Date of birth: 5 February 1995 (age 31)
- Place of birth: Reus, Spain
- Height: 1.84 m (6 ft 0 in)
- Position: Attacking midfielder

Team information
- Current team: Persik Kediri
- Number: 5

Youth career
- –2003: Santes Creus
- 2003–2011: Barcelona
- 2011–2014: Arsenal

Senior career*
Years	Team	Apps	(Gls)
2014–2017	Arsenal	0	(0)
2014–2015	→ Brentford (loan)	35	(6)
2015–2016	→ Birmingham City (loan)	36	(8)
2016–2017	→ Granada (loan)	5	(0)
2017	→ Rangers (loan)	12	(2)
2017–2020	Hull City	49	(1)
2020–2021	Birmingham City	16	(2)
2021–2024	OFI	71	(13)
2024–2026	Mumbai City	17	(1)
2026–	Persik Kediri	16	(3)
- * Club domestic league appearances and goals as of 22:00, 31 October 2026 (UTC)

Jon Miquel Toral Harper (born 5 February 1995) is a Spanish professional footballer who plays as an attacking midfielder for Super League club Persik Kediri.

A product of the Barcelona and Arsenal academies, Toral spent the 2014–15 season on loan to Championship club Brentford, the following season on loan to Birmingham City, also of the Championship, the first half of the 2016–17 season at La Liga club Granada and the second half at Rangers of the Scottish Premiership. He left Arsenal for Hull City in August 2017, before spending the 2020–21 season back with Birmingham City.

== Club career ==
=== Barcelona ===
Born in Reus, Tarragona, Catalonia, Toral began playing football as a child with his local club, UE Barri Santes Creus, and signed for Barcelona in 2003, after being discovered by youth football coordinator Albert Puig. At Barcelona, Toral quickly forged a midfield partnership with Sergi Samper. The pair would play together for eight years and were referred to as the "Samper & Toral Limited Company" in the Spanish media. Toral was a part of the under-15 team which won the 2009–10 Manchester United Premier Cup. He departed Barça in the summer of 2011.

=== Arsenal ===
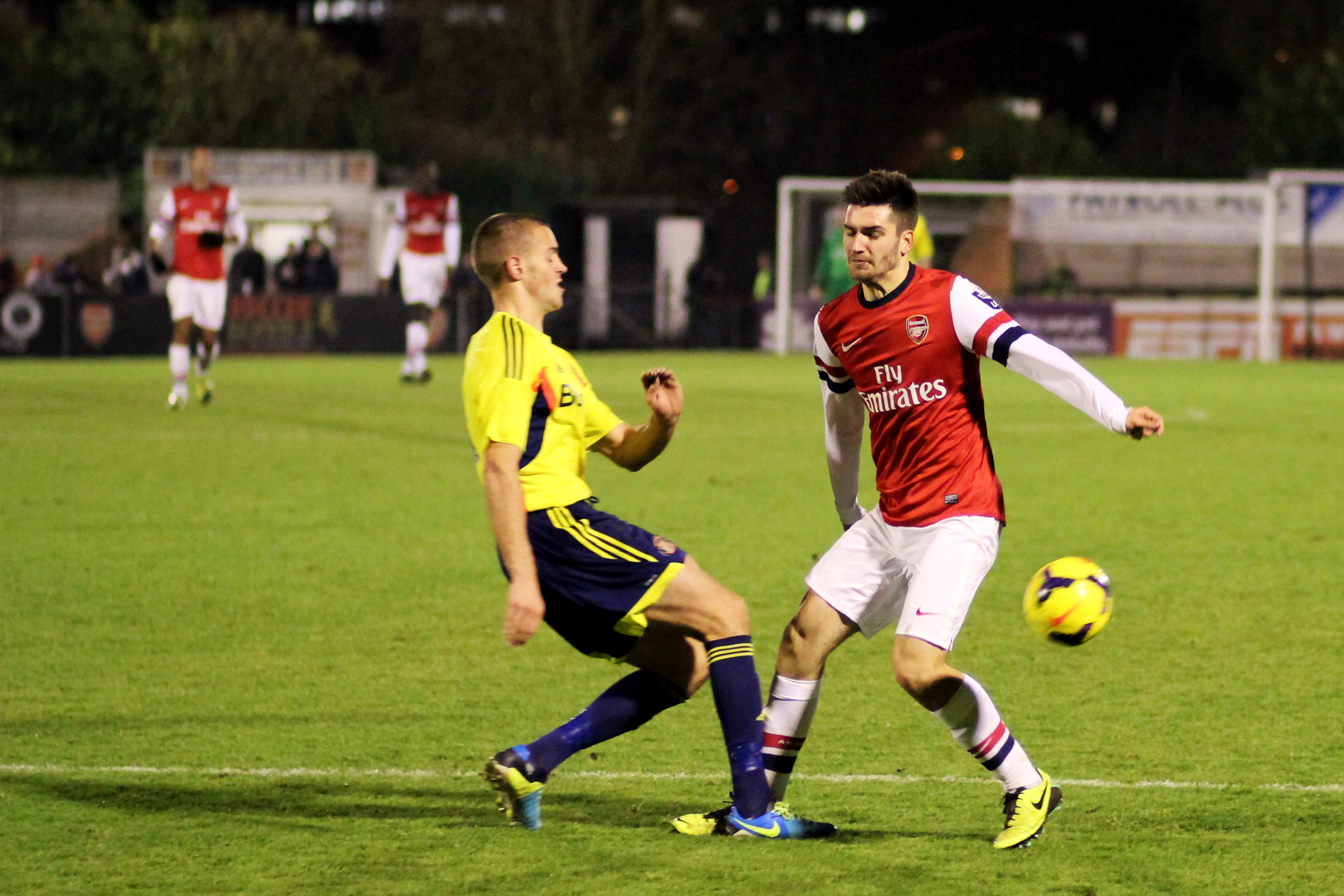
Jon Toral (right) with Arsenal against Sunderland

Toral caught the attention of Premier League club Arsenal while playing in England at the Manchester United Premier Cup in 2010. Along with Barcelona youth teammate Héctor Bellerín, he signed for the Gunners in the summer of 2011 for a fee reported as around £300,000; Barcelona president Sandro Rosell described the deal as "a little immoral". Toral began his career at Arsenal out injured with a damaged meniscus of his right knee, suffered in his final appearance for Barcelona in May 2011. After recovering, Toral made his debut for the reserves in a 2–0 Premier Reserve League defeat to Aston Villa on 30 November 2011, but was injured again in January 2012. Toral appeared for Arsenal in the 2012–13 NextGen Series and the 2013–14 UEFA Youth League, scoring two goals in five appearances in the latter competition. He broke into the reserve team during the 2013–14 season, scoring six goals in twenty appearances. Toral was called into the first team squad for pre-season friendly matches against Boreham Wood and New York Red Bulls in July 2014, making a start and a substitute appearance respectively. Toral spent the entire 2014–15 season away on loan and impressed sufficiently to be awarded a one-year contract extension. Toral was involved in Arsenal's pre-season tour of Singapore ahead of the 2015–16 season. He came on as a substitute against Singapore Selection XI on 15 July 2015 and won the penalty from which Chuba Akpom made it 3–0.

==== Brentford (loan) ====
Toral joined newly promoted Championship club Brentford on a season-long loan on 15 August 2014. After the signing, manager Mark Warburton said Toral was "an excellent addition to our group. This is a sign of the relationship we have with Arsenal and our continuing desire to add quality to our playing squad". Assigned the number 17 shirt, Toral made the first professional appearance of his career with a start in a 1–0 League Cup second-round defeat to West London rivals Fulham on 26 August; he lasted 63 minutes before being substituted by Toumani Diagouraga. He made his league debut in the following match against Rotherham United, coming on for goalscorer Andre Gray and assisting Nick Proschwitz for the Bees' second goal in a 2–0 win. After four further substitute appearances, Warburton commented that Toral had been outstanding in training and was pushing for a first-team start. He scored the first senior goal of his career with what proved to be a consolation in a 3–1 defeat to Bolton Wanderers on 25 October, just two minutes after coming on as a late substitute for Alex Pritchard. He scored his second goal with the opener in a 3–1 win at Nottingham Forest on Bonfire Night, shooting in the box through a crowd of players. Toral said in February 2015 that Griffin Park was "a great place to be now and I'm enjoying every minute of it – every game, every training session I'm learning". He scored the first senior hat-trick of his career to send the Bees on the way to a 4–0 victory over Blackpool on 24 February, and took his tally to four goals in three matches in a 4–1 defeat of Huddersfield Town a week later. He finished the season with 37 appearances and 6 goals, after the Bees' defeat to Middlesbrough in the playoff semi-finals.

==== Birmingham City (loan) ====
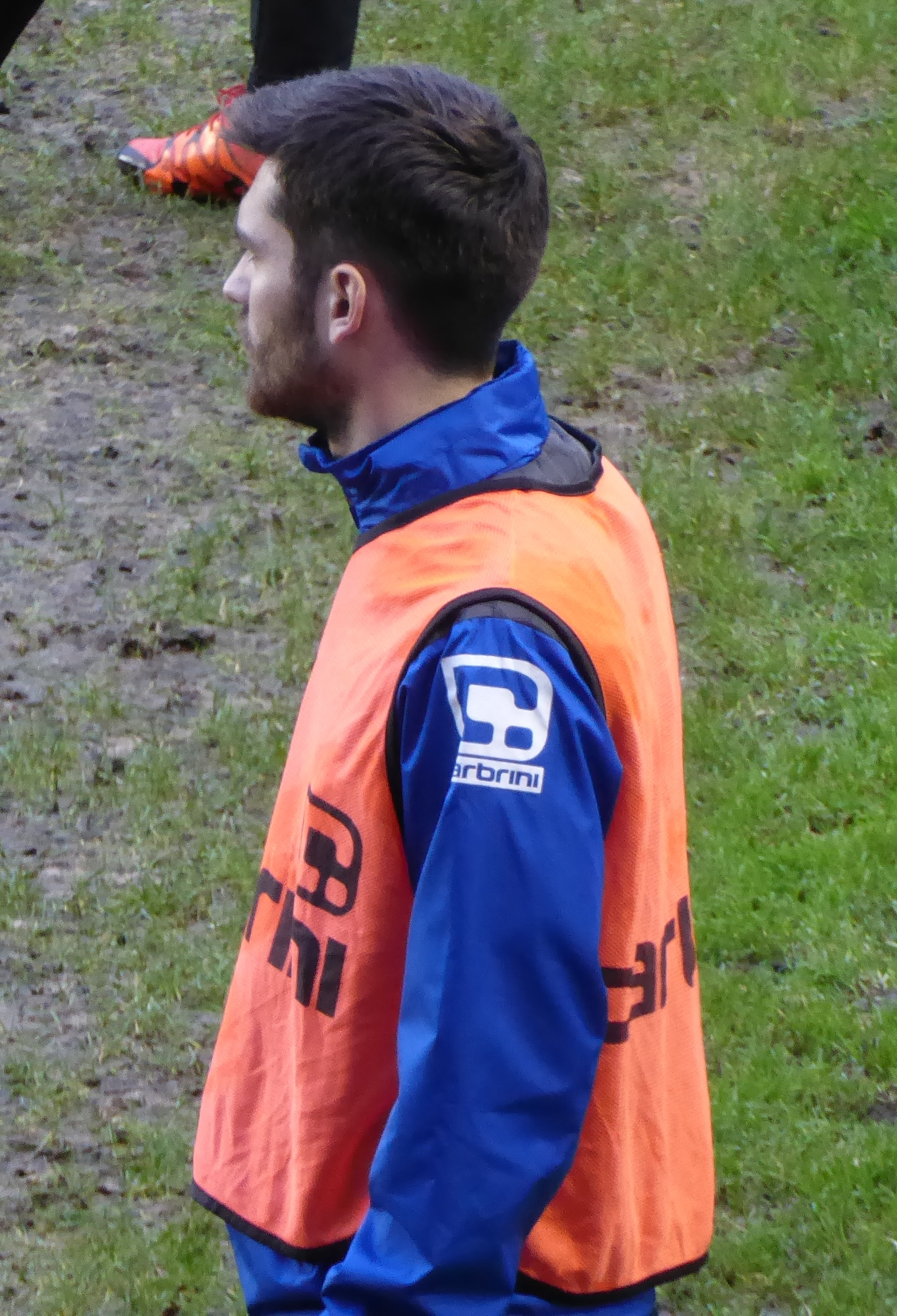
Toral with Birmingham City in 2016

Toral joined another Championship club, Birmingham City, on 30 July 2015 on loan for the season He went straight into the starting eleven for the opening match of the season, a 2–1 win at home to Reading, and scored Birmingham's second goal with a header from Donaldson's cross. The following week, he opened the scoring after 10 minutes of the visit to Burnley with a left-footed shot from outside the penalty area after Donaldson flicked on a clearance from the goalkeeper; the match ended 2–2. In September, he created one goal for Donaldson with an "astute through ball catching [Bristol City's defence napping", and another via a penalty awarded for a foul on Toral for which the Bristol City manager thought he should have been booked for diving. Regular starts were taking their toll: Toral was rested for the win at Brentford at the end of the month and made four substitute appearances in the next six matches.

He returned to the starting eleven and to goalscoring in the 5–2 away win at Fulham on 7 November, when manager Gary Rowett described him as "the best player on the pitch, in terms of his composure and his vision." From then on, he kept his place in the starting eleven, despite competition from January purchase Diego Fabbrini for the playmaker role, until his season ended prematurely. He was sent off in stoppage time of the home defeat against Burnley on 16 April for a second yellow card, and then injured a hamstring in training that kept him out for the last four matches of the season. He finished as the team's second highest scorer with eight goals. The sixth, at home to Ipswich Town in January, for which "Tomasz Kuszczak launched a free kick down the middle, Clayton Donaldson headed on and before the ball hit the ground Toral fired a dipping volley over the goalkeeper from 25 yards", earned him the club's Goal of the Season award, to add to his Players' Player of the Season and Supporters' Player of the Season awards.

==== Granada (loan) ====
On 12 July 2016, Toral was loaned to La Liga club Granada. He made his debut for the club on 20 August, starting in a 1–1 home draw against Villarreal. He scored his first goal in Spain on 30 November to win a Copa del Rey match at home to Osasuna, with a shot hit with the outside of his left foot described by Marca's reporter as the finest seen for Granada in months. He made only six appearances for Granada, and was recalled by Arsenal on 10 January 2017 amid expectations of a loan to Rangers of the Scottish Premiership.

==== Rangers (loan) ====
On 12 January 2017, Toral joined Rangers on loan until the end of the season. He was reunited with Mark Warburton, who had managed him at Brentford. Toral made his Rangers debut in a 2016–17 Scottish Cup win over Motherwell at Ibrox Stadium on 21 January, and scored his first goal for the club in a Scottish Cup win over Hamilton Academical on 4 March. Toral ended his loan spell with 15 appearances and 3 goals in all competitions.

=== Hull City ===
After six years as an Arsenal player without making a single first-team appearance for the club, Toral signed a three-year deal with Hull City of the Championship on 24 August 2017. The fee was undisclosed, but reported as £3 million.

Toral made his debut against Bolton Wanderers on 25 August 2017, when he came off the bench in a 4–0 home win. He scored his first goal for Hull – minutes after having a penalty kick saved by Costel Pantilimon – on 10 February 2018 in a 2–0 away win against Nottingham Forest.

Following Hull's relegation to League One at the end of the 2019–20 season, Toral was released.

=== Birmingham City ===
Toral returned to Birmingham City in August 2020; he signed a one-year contract with an option for a second year. He made his second debut as a substitute in the opening fixture of the season, a 1–0 defeat at home to fourth-tier Cambridge United in the EFL Cup, and started the first four Championship matches. A groin injury kept him out for a few weeks, but once fit, he found it difficult to force his way into Aitor Karanka's squad. He started two games in a row in early December: in what the Birmingham Mail called "an inexplicable difference to the form he had showed so far this season", he scored both goals in the 2–1 win away to Reading. The player himself attributed his improvement to hard work, getting used to how his team-mates play, and renewed confidence from being given consecutive starts, particularly after the arrival of a rival for the number 10 role in Alen Halilović. With Karanka reportedly concerned about his fitness, Toral was omitted from the next match; he started five more by the end of January, after which he fell behind Halilović in the pecking order. Under new head coach Lee Bowyer, Toral made two more appearances from the bench; in the second, he suffered a hamstring injury that would keep him out for the rest of the season. Birmingham confirmed that he would leave the club when his contract expired.

=== OFI ===
Toral signed a three-year contract with Greek Super League club OFI on 16 July 2021. On 20 November 2021, OFI got a significant away win against rivals Volos F.C. thanks to a brace by Toral (12 'and 50') and OFI remained undefeated for the next five consecutive game in the Greek Super League. Toral also won the MVP award for that match.

=== Mumbai City FC ===
Toral signed a two-year contract with Indian Super League club Mumbai City FC on 2 July 2024. He made his debut for the club against Mohun Bagan SG on 13 September 2024, starting the match but being substituted off in the 41st minute. Toral won his first Man of the Match award in India on 26 January 2025, at home against Mohammedan SC in an eventual 3-0 for the club. This performance also got him a slot in the ISL Team of the Week.

Toral's first goal for the Islanders came on 1 March 2025 against Mohun Bagan. At 2-0 down, after the club won a corner in the 57th minute, full-back Valpuia's long shot was blocked, but the ball ricocheted off Toral and into the net, to make it 2-1. Mumbai went on to equalize late through Nathan Rodrigues as the game ended in a 2-2 draw.

On 14 January 2026, Mumbai City announced they had mutually parted ways with Toral.

=== Persik Kediri ===
On 15 January 2026, Toral signed with Indonesia Super League club Persik Kediri for the remainder of the season.

== International career ==
Toral was called up to the Spain under-17 squad for a friendly against Italy on 25 January 2012, but was an unused substitute in the 5–1 win. He has also been called up to the under-19 team. He is also eligible to represent England, because his mother is English.

== Personal life ==
Toral has an English mother and has spoken the language since early childhood.

== Career statistics ==
As of match played 14 May 2023

Appearances and goals by club, season and competition
Club	Season	League			National cup (Note: Includes FA Cup, Copa del Rey, Scottish Cup, Greek Cup)		League cup (Note: Includes Football League Cup/EFL Cup, Scottish League Cup)		Other		Total	
Club	Season	Division	Apps	Goals	Apps	Goals	Apps	Goals	Apps	Goals	Apps	Goals
Arsenal	2014–15	Premier League	0	0	0	0	0	0	0	0	0	0
Brentford (loan)	2014–15	Championship	34	6	1	0	1	0	1 (Note: Appearance in Championship play-offs)	0	37	6
Birmingham City (loan)	2015–16	Championship	36	8	1	0	1	0	—		38	8
Granada (loan)	2016–17	La Liga	5	0	1	1	—		—		6	1
Rangers (loan)	2016–17	Scottish Premiership	12	2	3	1	—		—		15	3
Hull City	2017–18	Championship	27	1	2	0	—		—		29	1
Hull City	2018–19	Championship	8	0	1	1	2	1	—		11	2
Hull City	2019–20	Championship	14	0	0	0	2	1	—		16	1
Hull City	Total		49	1	3	1	4	2	—		56	4
Birmingham City	2020–21	Championship	16	2	1	0	1	0	—		18	2
OFI	2021–22	Superleague Greece	22	3	2	0	—		—		24	3
OFI	2022–23	Superleague Greece	24	8	1	0	—		—		25	8
OFI	Total		46	11	3	0	0	0	—		49	11
Career total			198	30	13	3	7	2	1	0	219	35

== Honours ==
Barcelona Youth

- Manchester United Premier Cup: 2009–10

Individual

- Birmingham City Supporters' Player of the Season: 2015–16
- Birmingham City Players' Player of the Season: 2015–16
- Birmingham City Goal of the Season: 2015–16
