= Georgios Sournakis =

Greek footballer

Personal information
- Full name: Georgios Sournakis
- Date of birth: 7 November 1999 (age 27)
- Place of birth: Heraklion, Crete, Greece
- Height: 1.85 m (6 ft 1 in)
- Position: Midfielder

Team information
- Current team: Almopos Aridea
- Number: 7

Youth career
- –2019: OFI

Senior career*
Years	Team	Apps	(Gls)
2019–2021	OFI	6	(0)
2021–2023	Irodotos	26	(0)
2023–	Almopos Aridea	3	(1)
- * Club domestic league appearances and goals as of 15 June 2023

Georgios Sournakis (Greek: Γεώργιος Σουρνάκης; born 7 November 1999) is a Greek professional footballer who plays as a midfielder for Almopos Aridea.
