= Dimitrios Tasioulis =

Greek footballer

Personal information
- Full name: Dimitrios Tasioulis
- Date of birth: 19 February 1997 (age 29)
- Place of birth: Vlachogianni, Greece
- Height: 1.75 m (5 ft 9 in)
- Position: Left winger

Youth career
- 2014–2015: Tyrnavos

Senior career*
Years	Team	Apps	(Gls)
2015–2016	Tyrnavos	26	(3)
2016–2018	Olympiacos	0	(0)
2017–2018	→ Chania–Kissamikos (loan)	4	(0)
2018–2021	Apollon Larissa	61	(4)
2021–2022	Ierapetra	3	(0)
2022	Asteras Vlachioti	11	(1)
2022–2023	Iraklis Larissa	24	(2)
2023	Magnisiakos		
- * Club domestic league appearances and goals as of 17 June 2023

Dimitrios Tasioulis (Greek: Δημήτριος Τασιούλης; born 19 February 1997) is a Greek professional footballer who plays as a left winger.
