= Nikos Marinakis =

Greek footballer (born 1993)

Personal information
- Full name: Nikolaos Marinakis
- Date of birth: 12 September 1993 (age 33)
- Place of birth: Heraklion, Crete, Greece
- Height: 1.78 m (5 ft 10 in)
- Position: Right-back

Team information
- Current team: OFI
- Number: 4

Youth career
- 2008–2012: Panathinaikos

Senior career*
Years	Team	Apps	(Gls)
2012–2017	Panathinaikos	49	(0)
2014	→ Niki Volos (loan)	13	(0)
2017–2019	Panetolikos	55	(0)
2019–	OFI	119	(1)

International career
2010	Greece U17	6	(0)
2010	Greece U18	3	(0)
2010–2012	Greece U19	28	(0)
2013	Greece U20	4	(0)
2013–2014	Greece U21	4	(0)
Medal record
Men's football
Representing Greece
UEFA European Under-19 Championship
Runner-up	2012 Estonia
- * Club domestic league appearances and goals as of 14 June 2026

Nikos Marinakis (Greek: Νίκος Μαρινάκης; born 12 September 1993) is a Greek professional footballer who plays as a right-back for Super League club OFI.

== Career ==
Marinakis is a product of Panathinaikos's youth ranks. He promoted to the first team on 28 June 2012, signing a contract which keeps him in Panathinaikos until 2015. On 7 August 2014, Marinakis signed for Niki Volos on a season-long loan deal, but he returned to Panathinaikos on 2 January 2015. On 10 March 2016, the right defender of Panathinaikos renewed his contract with the club, which was expiring at the end of season, until the summer of 2017. On 1 March 2017, thanks to a close-range header from the right defender in the additional time, Panathinaikos won 1–0 Asteras Tripolis on the road to the final of the Greek Cup. It was the first goal of the player with the club in all competitions. On 14 June 2017, Marinakis mutually terminated his contract with Panathinaikos.

On 26 June 2017, Marinakis signed a three-year contract with Panetolikos.

On 2 July 2019, Marinakis signed a three years' contract sith OFI for an undisclosed fee. His transfer to OFI marked a homecoming to Heraklion, solidifying his bond with his birthplace while contributing significantly to the club in Greece's Super League.

== Career statistics ==
=== Club ===
As of 12 March 2026

Club	Season	League			Cup		Continental		Total	
Club	Season	Division	Apps	Goals	Apps	Goals	Apps	Goals	Apps	Goals
Panathinaikos	2013–14	Super League Greece	19	0	2	0	—		21	0
Panathinaikos	2014–15	Super League Greece	3	0	0	0	—		3	0
Panathinaikos	2015–16	Super League Greece	14	0	3	0	0	0	17	0
Panathinaikos	2016–17	Super League Greece	13	0	3	1	0	0	16	1
Panathinaikos	Total		49	0	8	1	0	0	57	1
Niki Volos (loan)	2014–15	Super League Greece	13	0	0	0	—		13	0
Panetolikos	2017–18	Super League Greece	28	0	2	0	—		30	0
Panetolikos	2018–19	Super League Greece	23	0	2	0	—		25	0
Panetolikos	Total		51	0	4	0	—		55	0
OFI	2019–20	Super League Greece	29	0	3	0	—		32	0
OFI	2020–21	Super League Greece	11	0	0	0	1	0	12	0
OFI	2021–22	Super League Greece	27	0	3	0	–		30	0
OFI	2022–23	Super League Greece	13	0	0	0	–		13	0
OFI	2023–24	Super League Greece	14	1	1	0	–		15	1
OFI	2024–25	Super League Greece	14	0	4	0	–		18	0
OFI	2025–26	Super League Greece	10	0	5	0	–		15	0
Total			118	1	16	0	1	0	135	1
Career total			231	1	28	1	1	0	260	2

== Honours ==
Panathinaikos

- Greek Cup: 2013–14

OFI

- Greek Cup: 2025–26
- Greek Super Cup: 2026

Greece U19

- UEFA European Under-19 Championship runner-up: 2012
