= Odysseas Lymperakis =

Greek footballer (born 1998)

Personal information
- Full name: Odysseas Vlasios Lymperakis
- Date of birth: 5 June 1998 (age 28)
- Place of birth: Kavala, Greece
- Height: 1.76 m (5 ft 9 in)
- Position: Left-back

Team information
- Current team: Nestos Chrysoupoli
- Number: 34

Youth career
- 2015–2017: Kavala

Senior career*
Years	Team	Apps	(Gls)
2017–2019	Kavala	0	(0)
2019–2020	Panionios	20	(0)
2020–2022	OFI	25	(0)
2022–2023	Volos	1	(0)
2023	Panserraikos	11	(0)
2023–2024	Makedonikos	26	(0)
2024–2025	Panachaiki	15	(0)
2025	AEL	6	(0)
2025–2026	Kalamata	15	(0)
2026	Zakynthos	0	(0)
2026–	Nestos Chrysoupoli	0	(0)

International career
2019–2020	Greece U21	2	(0)
- * Club domestic league appearances and goals as of 20:00, 21 March 2026 (UTC)

Odysseas Lymperakis (Greek: Οδυσσέας Λυμπεράκης; born 5 June 1998) is a Greek professional footballer who plays as a left-back for Super League 2 club Nestos Chrysoupoli.

== Honours ==
Panserraikos

- Super League 2: 2022–23

AEL

- Super League 2: 2024–25

Kalamata

- Super League 2: 2025–26

Kavala

- Gamma Ethniki: 2018–19
