= Miguel Mellado =

Argentine footballer

Personal information
- Full name: Miguel Alberto Mellado
- Date of birth: 18 February 1993 (age 33)
- Place of birth: Río Negro, Argentina
- Height: 1.76 m (5 ft 9 1/2 in)
- Position: Defensive midfielder

Team information
- Current team: Panachaiki

Youth career
- Chacarita Juniors

Senior career*
Years	Team	Apps	(Gls)
2012–2020	Chacarita Juniors	162	(3)
2013	→ Deportivo Merlo (loan)	17	(0)
2018–2020	→ OFI (loan)	42	(1)
2020–2024	OFI	104	(3)
2024–2025	AEL Limassol	15	(0)
2025	Athens Kallithea	15	(1)
2025–2026	PAE Chania	11	(0)
2025–2006	Chacarita Juniors	3	(0)
2026–	Panachaiki	0	(0)
- * Club domestic league appearances and goals as of 17:51, 14 July 2026 (UTC)

Miguel Alberto Mellado (born 18 March 1993) is an Argentine professional footballer who plays as a defensive midfielder for Chacarita Juniors.

== Career ==
=== Chacarita Juniors ===
Mellado started his career with Chacarita Juniors. He made his debut in Primera B Metropolitana on 1 September 2012 in a 1–3 win away to Tristán Suárez. On 27 October, he scored his first professional goal at home to Brown. In total, Mellado played twenty-six times during 2012–13. From January 2014, across the next six seasons, Mellado scored two goals in one hundred and twenty appearances as the club rose from the third tier to the Argentine Primera División.

==== Deportivo Merlo loan ====
Mellado was loaned out for the first part of 2013–14 to fellow Primera B Metropolitana club Deportivo Merlo, he went onto play seventeen times for Merlo before returning to Chacarita.

==== OFI loan ====
In July 2018, Mellado joined newly promoted Super League Greece side OFI on loan for one year. On 14 June 2019, OFI announced that Mellado's loan had been extended by an additional year. The Greek club also held a buy-out clause for the summer of 2020, for a reported sum of around €200,000. In two years with OFI, Mellado made forty-eight appearances and scored one goal; versus Aris on 24 August 2019, in a season that ended with UEFA Europa League qualification - twelve months after the club narrowly avoided relegation via the play-offs.

=== OFI ===
In August 2020, OFI completed the permanent signing of Mellado. He made his continental competition debut on 17 September, featuring for the full duration of the club's loss to Apollon Limassol in the Europa League second qualifying round. He scored his first goal of 2020–21 on 18 October versus Panathinaikos.

=== Panachaiki ===
In July 2026, the player signed a contract with Panachaiki.. The team is currently at the 3rd division and with his help will soon promote to the second.

== Career statistics ==
As of 21 January 2025.

Club statistics
Club	Season	League			National Cup		Continental		Other		Total	
Club	Season	Division	Apps	Goals	Apps	Goals	Apps	Goals	Apps	Goals	Apps	Goals
Chacarita Juniors	2012–13	Primera B Metropolitana	25	1	1	0	—		—		26	1
Chacarita Juniors	2013–14	Primera B Metropolitana	12	1	1	0	—		—		13	1
Chacarita Juniors	2014	Primera B Metropolitana	17	0	0	0	—		—		17	0
Chacarita Juniors	2015	Primera B Nacional	37	1	4	0	—		—		41	1
Chacarita Juniors	2016	Primera B Nacional	16	0	0	0	—		—		16	0
Chacarita Juniors	2016–17	Primera B Nacional	38	0	0	0	—		—		38	0
Chacarita Juniors	2017–18	Primera División	17	0	0	0	—		—		17	0
Chacarita Juniors	2018–19	Primera B Nacional	0	0	0	0	—		—		0	0
Chacarita Juniors	2019–20	Primera B Nacional	0	0	0	0	—		—		0	0
Chacarita Juniors	Total		162	3	6	0	—		—		168	3
Deportivo Merlo (loan)	2013–14	Primera B Metropolitana	17	0	1	0	—		—		18	0
OFI (loan)	2018–19	Superleague Greece	22	0	2	0	—		—		24	0
OFI (loan)	2019–20	Superleague Greece	22	1	2	0	—		—		24	1
OFI (loan)	Total		44	1	4	0	—		—		48	1
OFI	2020–21	Superleague Greece	28	1	1	0	1 (Note: Appearance in UEFA Europa League)	0	—		30	1
OFI	2021–22	Superleague Greece	23	0	3	0	—		—		26	0
OFI	2022–23	Superleague Greece	27	2	1	0	—		—		28	2
OFI	2023–24	Superleague Greece	26	0	4	0	—		—		30	0
OFI	Total		104	3	9	0	1	0	—		114	3
AEL Limassol	2024–25	Cypriot First Division	15	0	2	0	—		—		17	0
Career total			342	7	22	0	1	0	0	0	365	7
