= Vasilios Sifakis =

Greek footballer

Personal information
- Date of birth: 27 October 2001 (age 25)
- Place of birth: Greece
- Position: Goalkeeper

Youth career
- OFI

Senior career*
Years	Team	Apps	(Gls)
2019–2025	OFI	0	(0)
2023–2025	→ Diagoras (loan)	9	(0)
- * Club domestic league appearances and goals as of 26 November 2023

Vasilios Sifakis (Greek: Βασίλειος Σηφάκης; born 27 October 2001) is a Greek professional footballer who plays as a goalkeeper.

== Career ==
=== OFI ===
Sifakis was a key player with the U19 team of OFI, where he amassed 33 appearances.

On 9 July 2021, OFI announced the extension of his contract for two more years.

=== Diagoras ===
Sifakis was loaned to Diagoras in 2023. On 26 November 2023 Sifakis broken his leg during an away game against Panachaiki.

== Personal life ==
Vasilios is the son of Myron and the younger brother of Michalis and Marios.
