= Juan Neira =

Argentine footballer

Personal information
- Full name: Juan Ángel Neira
- Date of birth: 21 February 1989 (age 37)
- Place of birth: La Plata, Argentina
- Height: 1.79 m (5 ft 10 in)
- Position: Attacking midfielder

Team information
- Current team: Zakynthos
- Number: 10

Senior career*
Years	Team	Apps	(Gls)
2006–2013	Gimnasia LP	39	(8)
2011–2012	→ Lanús (loan)	16	(0)
2012–2013	→ Valladolid (loan)	7	(0)
2013–2014	Estudiantes Tecos	22	(1)
2013–2014	Mineros de Zacatecas	0	(0)
2014–2015	Fénix	4	(0)
2015	Newell's Old Boys	3	(0)
2015–2017	Coras	37	(6)
2016–2017	→ Mineros de Zacatecas (loan)	16	(3)
2017–2018	Zacatepec	47	(11)
2018–2026	OFI	165	(27)
2026–	Zakynthos	4	(0)

International career
2008–2009	Argentina U20	6	(0)
- * Club domestic league appearances and goals as of 20 October 2026

Juan Ángel Neira (born 21 February 1989) is an Argentine professional footballer who plays as an attacking midfielder for Super League Greece 2 club Zakynthos.

== Club career ==
In August 2011, Neira joined Lanús on a one-year loan from Gimnasia y Esgrima de La Plata, with an option to sign permanently. Lanús did not choose the option, and in 2012 Neira signed another one-year loan with the Spanish team Valladolid. On 31 July 2013, he joined the Mexican Ascenso MX side Estudiantes Tecos. The following years he played mostly in Mexico.

=== OFI ===
On 29 June 2018, he signed a year contract with newly Super League club OFI. In his debut season with the Greek club, Juan appeared in 24 matches, scoring 6 goals and giving 1 assist. On 4 July 2019, he signed a contract renewal until the summer of 2021.

His first goal for the 2019–20 season came in a 3–1 home win against Asteras Tripolis, on 29 September 2019. On 6 October 2019, he scored in a triumphant 4–1 home win against Panionios. On 4 December 2019, Neira scored a brace in a 4–0 home win against Kavala, securing his team's spot in the round of 16 of the Greek Cup.

On 4 January 2020, he scored in a 2–1 home loss against Volos.

On 4 July 2020, he scored with a nice left-footed strike in a 2–2 home draw against PAOK.

He scored in the 2020–21 season's opener, a 1–1 home draw against Panetolikos, on 12 September 2020. On 23 November 2020, he scored with a penalty in an emphatic 4–1 away win against Volos. The following week, he scored with a penalty in a 2–1 win against PAS Giannina, the first at home for the season.

== International career ==
In January 2009, Neira was selected to join the Argentina under-20 squad for the 2009 South American U-20 Championship held in Venezuela.

== Honours ==
OFI

- Greek Cup: 2025–26
