= Paschalis Staikos =

Greek footballer

Personal information
- Date of birth: 8 February 1996 (age 30)
- Place of birth: Drama, Greece
- Height: 1.78 m (5 ft 10 in)
- Position: Midfielder

Team information
- Current team: Panserraikos
- Number: 26

Youth career
- 2009–2014: Panathinaikos

Senior career*
Years	Team	Apps	(Gls)
2014–2019	Panathinaikos	21	(0)
2019–2023	OFI	74	(4)
2023–2025	Panserraikos	74	(6)
2025–2026	AEL	12	(0)
2026–	Panserraikos	2	(0)

International career
2012–2014	Greece U17	4	(1)
2015	Greece U19	6	(0)
2016–2018	Greece U21	3	(0)
- * Club domestic league appearances and goals as of 13 September 2026

Paschalis Staikos (Greek: Πασχάλης Στάικος; born 8 February 1996) is a Greek professional footballer who plays as a defensive midfielder for Super League 2 club Panserraikos.

== Career ==
He plays mainly as a defensive midfielder, though he has tried in several positions. He was Panathinaikos U-20 team's captain. He debuted in the first team on 7 June 2015 at the match Atromitos - Panathinaikos 2–0, for the playoffs.

=== OFI ===
On 31 August 2019, OFI officially announced the signing of the young midfielder, until the summer of 2021.

Roughly a year later, Staikos signed a contract extension, until the summer of 2023. His first goal for the club came in a 2–1 away defeat against Panetolikos, on 3 January 2021. Four days later, he converted a penalty in a 2–0 home win against Lamia.

=== Panserraikos ===
On 13 January 2023, he joined Panserraikos on a free transfer.

== Career statistics ==
As of 18 December 2023

Club	Season	League			National Cup		Continental		Other		Total	
Club	Season	Division	Apps	Goals	Apps	Goals	Apps	Goals	Apps	Goals	Apps	Goals
Panathinaikos	2014–15	Super League Greece	1	0	0	0	—		—		1	0
Panathinaikos	2015–16	Super League Greece	0	0	0	0	0	0	—		0	0
Panathinaikos	2016–17	Super League Greece	2	0	0	0	0	0	—		2	0
Panathinaikos	2017–18	Super League Greece	7	0	0	0	—		—		7	0
Panathinaikos	2018–19	Super League Greece	11	0	3	0	—		—		14	0
Panathinaikos	Total		21	0	3	0	0	0	—		24	0
OFI	2019–20	Super League Greece	26	0	4	0	—		—		30	0
OFI	2020–21	Super League Greece	23	3	2	0	1	0	—		26	3
OFI	2021–22	Super League Greece	15	1	1	0	0	0	—		16	1
OFI	2022–23	Super League Greece	10	0	0	0	0	0	—		10	0
OFI	Total		74	4	7	0	1	0	—		82	4
Panserraikos	2022–23	Super League Greece 2	15	0	1	0	—		—		16	0
Panserraikos	2023–24	Super League Greece	29	4	3	0	—		—		32	4
Panserraikos	Total		44	4	4	0	0	0	—		48	4
Career total			139	8	14	0	1	0	0	0	154	8
