= Praxitelis Vouros =

Greek footballer

Personal information
- Date of birth: 5 May 1995 (age 31)
- Place of birth: Mytilene, Greece
- Height: 1.83 m (6 ft 0 in)
- Position: Centre-back

Team information
- Current team: Iraklis
- Number: 2

Youth career
- –2012: Aiolikos
- 2012–2013: Olympiacos

Senior career*
Years	Team	Apps	(Gls)
2013–2017	Olympiacos	4	(0)
2017	→ Levadiakos (loan)	10	(0)
2017–2020	APOEL	64	(0)
2020–2024	OFI	111	(3)
2024–2026	Apollon Limassol	48	(1)
2026–	Iraklis	7	(0)

International career^{‡}
2011–2012	Greece U17	4	(0)
2012–2013	Greece U18	5	(0)
2013–2015	Greece U19	8	(0)
2015–2016	Greece U21	10	(0)
- * Club domestic league appearances and goals as of 20 October 2026 ‡ National team caps and goals as of 10 October 2016

Praxitelis Vouros (Greek: Πραξιτέλης Βούρος; born 5 May 1995) is a Greek professional footballer who plays as a centre-back for Super League club Iraklis.

== Club career ==
On 29 August 2017, Cypriot champions APOEL signed Greek defender on a 3-year contract for an undisclosed fee. With the acquisition of Praxitelis Vouros, APOEL keeps the Greek element in his roster and bets on the skills of the 22-year-old footballer. APOEL coach Georgios Donis immediately asked the acquisition of the young defender as he solved his contract with Greek champions Olympiacos. The 22-year old defender had been a member of Greek champions Olympiacos for the past four seasons, having only four substitute appearances in those years for the Greek championship. On 25 July 2018, he renewed his contract to the summer of 2022 with APOEL.

On 1 August 2020, Vouros joined OFI on a three-year contract. On 20 September 2021, he scored his first professional goal, in the delays of a 3–3 home draw, after a three-goal lead from rivals AEK Athens in an astonishing comeback from his club OFI.

== International career ==
Vouros was 27 times capped with the U21, U19, U18 and U17 Greek national teams.

== Career statistics ==
As of match played 26 May 2024

Club	Season	League			National Cup		Continental		Other		Total	
Club	Season	Division	Apps	Goals	Apps	Goals	Apps	Goals	Apps	Goals	Apps	Goals
Olympiacos	2013–14	Super League Greece	1	0	1	0	0	0	–		2	0
Olympiacos	2014–15	Super League Greece	1	0	4	0	0	0	–		5	0
Olympiacos	2015–16	Super League Greece	2	0	3	0	0	0	–		5	0
Olympiacos	2016–17	Super League Greece	0	0	1	0	0	0	–		1	0
Olympiacos	Total		4	0	9	0	0	0	–		13	0
Levadiakos (loan)	2016–17	Super League Greece	10	0	1	0	–		–		11	0
APOEL	2017–18	Cypriot First Division	20	0	6	0	6	0	–		32	0
APOEL	2018–19	Cypriot First Division	28	0	4	0	5	0	1 (Note: Appearance in Cypriot Super Cup)	0	38	0
APOEL	2019–20	Cypriot First Division	16	0	1	0	7	0	–		24	0
APOEL	Total		64	0	11	0	18	0	1	0	94	0
OFI	2020–21	Super League Greece	20	0	1	0	1	0	–		22	0
OFI	2021–22	Super League Greece	31	3	2	0	–		–		33	3
OFI	2022–23	Super League Greece	29	0	1	0	–		–		30	0
OFI	2023–24	Super League Greece	31	0	5	0	–		–		36	0
OFI	Total		111	3	9	0	1	0	–		121	3
Career total			189	3	30	0	19	0	1	0	239	3

== Honours ==
Olympiacos

- Super League Greece: 2013–14, 2014–15, 2015–16
- Greek Cup: 2014–15

APOEL

- Cypriot First Division: 2017–18
