= Theodoros Vardinogiannis Stadium =

Football stadium in Heraklion, Crete, Greece

- Yedi Kule
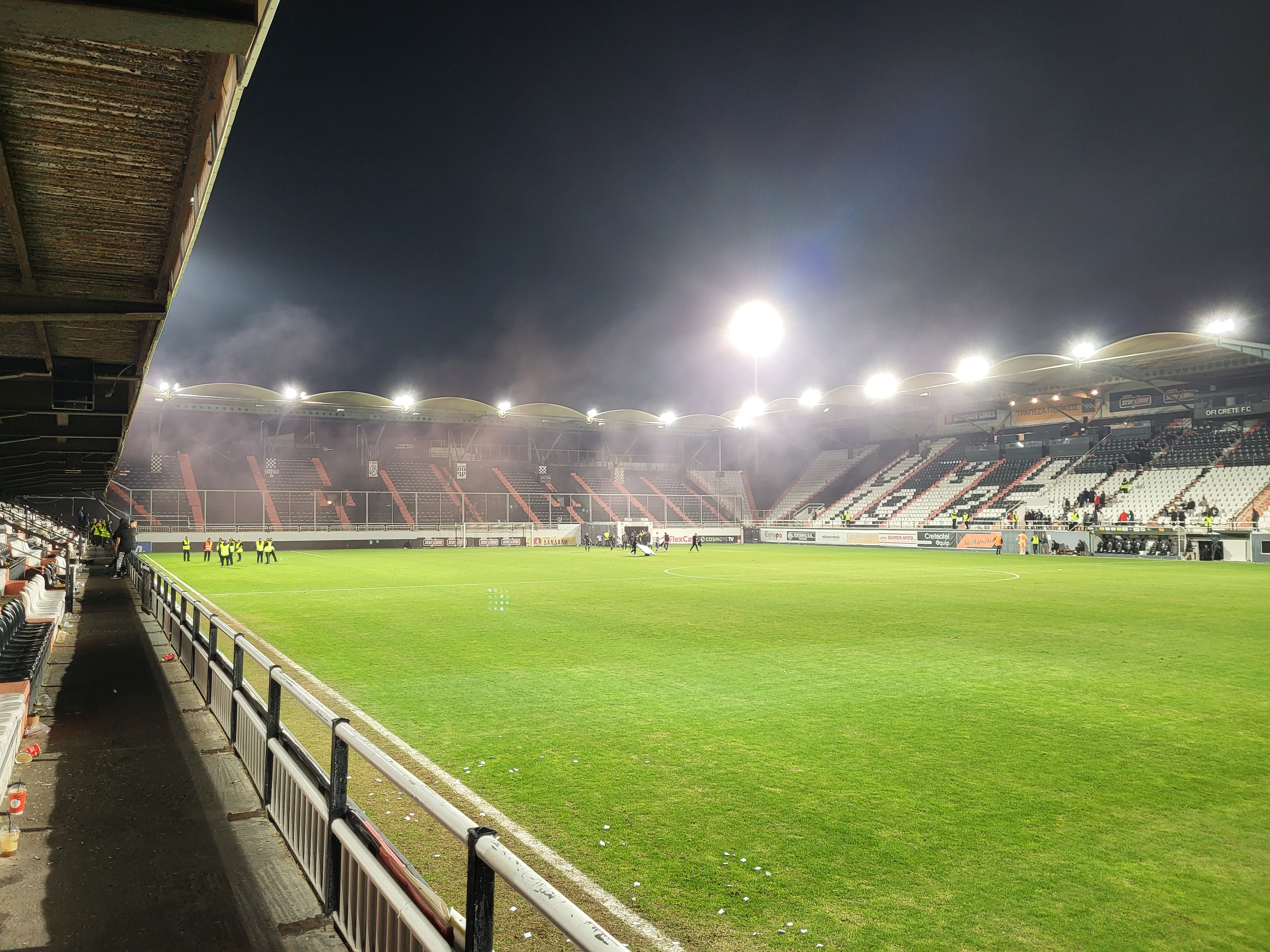
- Interactive map of Theodoros Vardinogiannis Stadium
- Location: Heraklion, Crete, Greece
- Coordinates: 35°20′17″N 25°06′53″E
- Owner: Amateur OFI
- Operator: OFI
- Capacity: 9,833
- Surface: Grass

Construction
- Groundbreaking: 1949
- Opened: 1951
- Renovated: 2004

Tenants
- OFI; Greece women's national football team

Theodoros Vardinogiannis Stadium (Greek: Γήπεδο Θεόδωρος Βαρδινογιάννης, romanized: Gipedo Theodoros Vardinogiannis), commonly referred to by its nickname, Yedi Kule, is a football stadium located in Heraklion, Crete, Greece. It was built in 1951 as the home ground of OFI. The nickname "Yedi Kule" refers to the historical Heptapyrgion fortress (known in Ottoman Turkish at یدی قله yedikulle, 'seven forts'), a Byzantine and Ottoman-era stronghold located in Thessaloniki. This nickname was adopted due to the fortress-like ambiance of the stadium, symbolizing strength and resilience.

== History ==
The stadium, originally constructed in 1951, was renamed "Theodoros Vardinogiannis" after the passing of Theodoros Vardinogiannis, a major benefactor and owner of OFI. Vardinogiannis played a key role in the club's development and success over the years. The inaugural match took place on November 11, 1951, where OFI faced Α.Σ.Δ.Α.Ν. (a team similar to the national team), with OFI losing 4–1. Despite the result, the significance of the match lay in the fact that the largest Cretan football club finally had a home to call its own, introducing a new era for football in Iraklion, Crete.

The stadium was built on the site of three cemeteries—Christian, Jewish, and Armenian. During construction, workers discovered remnants of two large holes, which were previously gun emplacements left by the German army during the World War II occupation of Crete.

Over the years, the stadium has undergone several renovations, most notably in 2004, and in 2018 a match stats display was added to the east side.

== Records ==
While the stadium's official seating capacity is 9,088, there have been occasions when attendance exceeded this number. From 1980 to 2005, the stadium hosted 380 matches, with 340 of them being professional league games. The highest recorded attendance at Yedi Kule was 12,391 fans during an OFI match against Olympiacos on September 25, 1988. OFI won the game 2–1, marking a historic victory for the club.

== Transportation ==
- Heraklion City Bus services with stops at Sofokli Venizelou Kantanou and Kaminia (routes 6, 7, 8, 10, 11, 12, 14, 15, 17, 19, 21, 23, 31)
