= List of Greek football transfers summer 2013 =

This is a list of Greek football transfers in the summer transfer window 2013 by club.

== AEL Kalloni ==
In: Note: Flags indicate national team as defined under FIFA eligibility rules; some limited exceptions apply. Players may hold more than one non-FIFA nationality.

No.	Pos.	Nation	Player
—	DF	BRA	Leandro (on loan from Olympiacos)
—	GK	MLT	Andrew Hogg (from (Cyprus) Enosis Neon Paralimni)
—	MF	POR	Hugo Faria (from (Cyprus) Enosis Neon Paralimni)
—	FW	BEL	Patrick Dimbala (from Panetolikos)
—	DF	SRB	Danijel Gašić (from (Serbia) OFK Beograd)
—	MF	ESP	Jonan García (from (Spain) Alavés)
—	FW	ARG	Emanuel Perrone (from Asteras Tripolis)
—	FW	BRA	Marko dos Santos (from Kavala)
—	DF	CZE	Jakub Podaný (on loan from (Czech Republic) Sparta Prague)
—	MF	ESP	Juanlu (from (Spain) Levante)
—	FW	GRE	Anestis Agritis (from Kerkyra)

Out: Note: Flags indicate national team as defined under FIFA eligibility rules; some limited exceptions apply. Players may hold more than one non-FIFA nationality.

No.	Pos.	Nation	Player

== Apollon Smyrnis ==
In: Note: Flags indicate national team as defined under FIFA eligibility rules; some limited exceptions apply. Players may hold more than one non-FIFA nationality.

No.	Pos.	Nation	Player
—	GK	GRE	Alexandros Tzorvas (from (Italy) Genoa)
—	GK	BRA	Felipe Alexandre Januário Gomes (from Brazil)
—	DF	POR	Francisco Zuela (from (Cyprus) APOEL)
—	DF	GRE	Angelos Vertzos (from (Greece) Niki Volos)
—	DF	GRE	Petros Kanakoudis (from (Greece) Platanias)
—	DF	GRE	Athanasios Panteliadis (from (Greece) Panserraikos)
—	DF	GRE	Leonidas Argyropoulos (from (Greece) Platanias)
—	MF	CZE	Jan Blažek (from (Czech Republic) FC Slovan Liberec)
—	MF	ARG	Leandro Alvarez (from (Greece) Asteras Tripolis)
—	MF	CIV	Did'dy Guela (from (Bulgaria) Ludogorets Razgrad)
—	MF	GRE	Panagiotis Korbos (from (Greece) Levadiakos)
—	MF	GRE	Christos Mingas (from (Greece) Panthrakikos)
—	FW	GRE	Antonis Petropoulos (from (Greece) AEK Athens)

Out: Note: Flags indicate national team as defined under FIFA eligibility rules; some limited exceptions apply. Players may hold more than one non-FIFA nationality.

No.	Pos.	Nation	Player
—	DF	GRE	Michalis Kyrgias (to Aris)
—	FW	GRE	Michalis Manias (to Aris)

== Aris ==
In: Note: Flags indicate national team as defined under FIFA eligibility rules; some limited exceptions apply. Players may hold more than one non-FIFA nationality.

No.	Pos.	Nation	Player
—	DF	GRE	Michalis Kyrgias (from Apollon Smyrnis)
—	MF	GRE	Giannis Papadopoulos (from Dynamo Dresden)
—	MF	SVN	Rok Elsner (from Śląsk Wrocław)
—	FW	GRE	Michalis Manias (from Apollon Smyrnis)
—	MF	GRE	Nikolaos Golias (from AO Karditsa)
—	GK	AUS	Dean Bouzanis (from Oldham Athletic)
—	MF	NGA	Chigozie Udoji (from Atromitos)
—	MF	GRE	Andreas Tatos (from Olympiacos)
—	DF	GRE	Nikos Tsoumanis (from Kerkyra)
—	DF	GRE	Angelos Sikalias (from Iraklis Psachna)
—	MF	NGA	John Ibeh (from Pandurii Târgu Jiu)

Out: Note: Flags indicate national team as defined under FIFA eligibility rules; some limited exceptions apply. Players may hold more than one non-FIFA nationality.

No.	Pos.	Nation	Player
—	FW	GRE	Dimitrios Diamantakos (loan return to Olympiacos)
—	DF	GRE	Giannis Zaradoukas (loan return to Olympiacos)
—	MF	GRE	Konstantinos Kasnaferis (released)
—	GK	GRE	Michalis Vellidis (released)
—	MF	GRE	Giannis Gianniotas (transferred to Fortuna Düsseldorf)
—	DF	GRE	Grigoris Papazaharias (released)
—	MF	GRE	Emmanouil Papasterianos (released)

== Asteras Tripolis ==
In: Note: Flags indicate national team as defined under FIFA eligibility rules; some limited exceptions apply. Players may hold more than one non-FIFA nationality.

No.	Pos.	Nation	Player
—	MF	GRE	Giorgos Zisopoulos (from Levadiakos)
—	DF	GRE	Christos Lisgaras (from Levadiakos)
—	DF	GRE	Giannis Zaradoukas (from Olympiacos)
—	MF	ARG	Juan Manuel Munafo (from Panthrakikos)
—	FW	ARG	Jerónimo Barrales (from (Argentina) Huracán)
—	DF	ROU	Dorin Goian (from (Scotland) Rangers)
—	MF	ARG	Sebastián Grazzini (from (United States) Chicago Fire)
—	MF	ARG	Mauricio Carrasco (from (Argentina) Estoudiantes La Plata)
—	GK	VEN	Dani Hernández (from (Spain) Real Valladolid)
—	DF	ARG	Braian Lluy (from (Argentina) Racing Club)

Out: Note: Flags indicate national team as defined under FIFA eligibility rules; some limited exceptions apply. Players may hold more than one non-FIFA nationality.

No.	Pos.	Nation	Player
—	MF	GRE	Michail Fragoulakis (to OFI)
—	MF	ESP	Ruben Rayos (to (Israel) Maccabi Haifa)
—	MF	ESP	Juanito (released)
—	MF	ARG	Leandro Alvarez (to Apollon Smyrnis)
—	FW	ARG	Emanuel Perrone (to AEL Kalloni)
—	MF	ESP	Marc Castells (released)
—	FW	HUN	László Lencse (to (Hungary) Videoton)

== Atromitos ==
In: Note: Flags indicate national team as defined under FIFA eligibility rules; some limited exceptions apply. Players may hold more than one non-FIFA nationality.

No.	Pos.	Nation	Player
11	FW	GRE	Dimitrios Papadopoulos (from Panthrakikos)
1	GK	ITA	Luigi Cennamo (from (Israel) Maccabi Netanya)
30	GK	GRE	Michalis Sifakis (from (Belgium) Charleroi)
8	MF	GRE	Fotis Georgiou (from PAS Giannina)
23	MF	ARG	Javier Umbides (from (Turkey) Orduspor)
36	DF	GRE	Christos Arkoudas (from (Greece) AEK Athens)

Out: Note: Flags indicate national team as defined under FIFA eligibility rules; some limited exceptions apply. Players may hold more than one non-FIFA nationality.

No.	Pos.	Nation	Player
2	DF	GRE	Ioannis Skondras (to PAOK)
86	MF	BRA	Chumbinho (loan return to Olympiacos)
9	FW	FIN	Njazi Kuqi (Released)

== Ergotelis ==
In: Note: Flags indicate national team as defined under FIFA eligibility rules; some limited exceptions apply. Players may hold more than one non-FIFA nationality.

No.	Pos.	Nation	Player
—	DF	ESP	Álvaro Mejía (from (Spain) Almería)
—	DF	SLE	Aziz Deen-Conteh (from (England) Chelsea Reserves)
—	MF	GRE	Manolis Tzanakakis (on loan from Olympiacos F.C.)
—	MF	GRE	Andreas Bouchalakis (on loan from Olympiacos F.C.)
—	MF	GRE	Ioannis Kiliaras (from Panachaiki)
—	MF	POR	Pelé (from (Turkey) Eskişehirspor)
—	MF	GRE	Christos Kasapakis (from Panathinaikos U20)
—	FW	GRE	Ilias Anastasakos (from Platanias F.C.)
—	MF	ARG	Horacio Cardozo (from (Cyprus) Apollon Limassol)
—	FW	GRE	Michalis Kouiroukidis (from Glyfada F.C. U20)
—	MF	BEL	Ziguy Badibanga (from (Belgium) RSC Anderlecht)
—	FW	GRE	Dimitrios Diamantakos (on loan from Olympiacos F.C.)

Out: Note: Flags indicate national team as defined under FIFA eligibility rules; some limited exceptions apply. Players may hold more than one non-FIFA nationality.

No.	Pos.	Nation	Player
—	FW	CRO	Dario Zahora (to Iraklis)
—	MF	GRE	Vangelis Georgiou (to Iraklis)
—	DF	GRE	Dimitris Kotsonis (Released)
—	MF	GRE	Loukas Tasigiannis (Released)
—	MF	SEN	Cheikh Gadiaga (Released)
—	MF	GRE	Vasilios Plousis (to Ermis Zoniana)
—	DF	GRE	Manolis Kandilakis (to Ermis Zoniana)
—	FW	CIV	Khallil Lambin (Released)
—	MF	GRE	Manolis Tzanakakis (to Olympiacos F.C.)
—	MF	GRE	Andreas Bouchalakis (to Olympiacos F.C.)

== Levadiakos ==
In: Note: Flags indicate national team as defined under FIFA eligibility rules; some limited exceptions apply. Players may hold more than one non-FIFA nationality.

No.	Pos.	Nation	Player
—	DF	GRE	Giorgos Ioannidis (from OFI)
—	MF	ITA	Pedro Sass (from (Hungary) Kaposvári Rákóczi FC)
—	MF	GRE	Giorgos Lambropoulos (from (Cyprus) Nea Salamina)
—	FW	GRE	Vangelis Mantzios (from Atromitos)
—	FW	GRE	Dimitris Giantsis (from Kerkyra)
—	MF	CIV	Emmanuel Koné (from (France) Sedan)
—	MF	ESP	Armiche (from (Spain) Valencia B)
—	DF	ESP	Manolo Martínez (from (Spain) Recreativo)
—	DF	GRE	Charalambos Lykogiannis (on loan from Olympiacos)
—	GK	GRE	Kiriakos Stratilatis (from Kerkyra)
—	FW	FRA	Olivier Kapo (from (France) Auxerre)
—	GK	POL	Sebastian Przyrowski (from Polonia Warszawa)
—	FW	SEN	Macoumba Kandji (from AEL Kalloni)
—	DF	URU	Rodrigo Sanguinetti (from (Uruguay) Central Español)

Out: Note: Flags indicate national team as defined under FIFA eligibility rules; some limited exceptions apply. Players may hold more than one non-FIFA nationality.

No.	Pos.	Nation	Player
—	FW	ARG	Mauro Poy (to Panetolikos)
—	MF	GRE	Giorgos Zisopoulos (to Asteras Tripolis)
—	DF	GRE	Christos Lisgaras (to Asteras Tripolis)

== OFI ==
In: Note: Flags indicate national team as defined under FIFA eligibility rules; some limited exceptions apply. Players may hold more than one non-FIFA nationality.

No.	Pos.	Nation	Player
—	FW	FRA	Frédéric Nimani (from (France) FC Istres)
—	MF	GRE	Michail Fragoulakis (from Asteras Tripolis)
—	DF	GRE	Theodoros Tripotseris (from Kavala)
—	DF	GRE	Giannis Stathis (from Panthrakikos)
—	DF	POR	Carlos Milhazes (from (Cyprus) Enosis Neon Paralimni)
—	GK	POR	Daniel Fernandes (from (Netherlands) Twente)
—	MF	ARG	Luciano Galletti (free agent)
—	MF	ARG	Michael Hoyos (from (Argentina) Estudiantes)
—	MF	SRB	Željko Kalajdžić (from Platanias)
—	DF	ZIM	Lincoln Zvasiya (from (South Africa) Kaizer Chiefs)
—	GK	GRE	Iosif Daskalakis (from Veria)

Out: Note: Flags indicate national team as defined under FIFA eligibility rules; some limited exceptions apply. Players may hold more than one non-FIFA nationality.

No.	Pos.	Nation	Player
—	DF	GRE	Manolis Zacharakis (to Panionios)
—	DF	GRE	Giorgos Ioannidis (to Levadiakos F.C.)
—	MF	GRE	Panagiotis Zorbas (to Kerkyra)
—	DF	SEN	Mohamed Sarr (Free Agent)
—	DF	GRE	Lazaros Charitonidis (Released)
—	MF	GRE	Pavlos Kolliakoudakis (on loan to PAO Kroussona)
—	MF	GRE	Nikomanolis Nyktaris (on loan to PAO Kroussona)

== Olympiacos ==
In: Note: Flags indicate national team as defined under FIFA eligibility rules; some limited exceptions apply. Players may hold more than one non-FIFA nationality.

No.	Pos.	Nation	Player
—	FW	ARG	Javier Saviola (from (Spain) Málaga)
—	FW	SRB	Marko Šćepović (from (Serbia) Partizan)
—	FW	SVK	Vladimir Weiss (from (Italy) Pescara)
—	MF	ARG	Alejandro Damián Domínguez (from (Spain) Rayo Vallecano)
—	DF	ESP	Miguel Torres Gómez (from (Spain) Getafe CF)
—	MF	MLI	Sambou Yatabaré (from (France) SC Bastia)
—	DF	CMR	Gaëtan Bong (from (France) Valenciennes FC)
—	DF	BRA	Leandro Salino (from (Portugal) Braga)
—	DF	ALG	Carl Medjani (from (France) AS Monaco)
—	FW	NGA	Michael Olaitan (from (Greece) Veria)
—	MF	ARG	Tomas De Vincenti (from (Greece) PAS Giannina)
—	FW	CRC	Joel Campbell (loan from (England) Arsenal F.C.)
—	GK	ESP	Roberto Jiménez Gago (loan from (Spain) Atlético Madrid)
—	MF	CGO	Delvin N'Dinga (loan from (France) AS Monaco)
—	MF	GRE	Andreas Samaris (loan return from (Greece) Panionios)
—	DF	FRA	Claude Dielna (loan return from (France) CS Sedan)
—	FW	MNE	Petar Grbic (loan return from (Serbia) OFK Beograd)
—	FW	SRB	Aleksandar Katai (loan return from (Serbia) FK Vojvodina)
—	DF	GRE	Giannis Potouridis (loan return from (Greece) Platanias)
—	MF	BRA	Chumbinho (loan return from (Greece) Atromitos)

Out: Note: Flags indicate national team as defined under FIFA eligibility rules; some limited exceptions apply. Players may hold more than one non-FIFA nationality.

No.	Pos.	Nation	Player
—	MF	GRE	Ioannis Fetfatzidis (to (Italy) Genoa)
—	FW	ALG	Djamel Abdoun (to (England) Nottingham Forest)
—	MF	SRB	Ljubomir Fejsa (to (Portugal) S.L. Benfica)
—	MF	ITA	Leandro Greco (to (Italy) Livorno)
—	DF	FRA	François Modesto (to (France) SC Bastia)
—	DF	MLI	Drissa Diakité (to (France) SC Bastia)
—	DF	CHI	Pablo Contreras (to (Australia) Melbourne Victory FC)
—	FW	SRB	Marko Pantelić (retired)
—	FW	COL	Juan Pablo Pino (to (Colombia) Independiente Medellín)
—	MF	BRA	Chumbinho (to (Azerbaijan) Qarabağ FK)
—	DF	GRE	Giannis Potouridis (to (Italy) Novara)
—	DF	GRE	Giannis Zaradoukas (to (Greece) Asteras Tripolis)
—	FW	ALG	Rafik Djebbour (on loan to (Turkey) Sivasspor)
—	DF	FRA	Claude Dielna (on loan to (France) Ajaccio)
—	FW	MNE	Petar Grbic (on loan to (Serbia) FK Partizan)
—	DF	BRA	Leandro (on loan to (Greece) AEL Kalloni)
—	FW	GRE	Panagiotis Vlachodimos (on loan to (Germany) FC Augsburg)
—	FW	GRE	Nikolaos Ioannidis (on loan to (Germany) F.C. Hansa Rostock)
—	FW	GRE	Charalambos Lykogiannis (on loan to (Greece) Levadiakos F.C.)
—	MF	ARG	Tomas De Vincenti (on loan to (Greece) PAS)
—	FW	SRB	Aleksandar Katai (on loan to (Greece) Platanias)
—	MF	GRE	Manolis Siopis (on loan to (Greece) Platanias))
—	FW	GRE	Andreas Tatos (on loan to (Greece) Aris)
—	FW	GRE	Vasilis Karagounis (on loan to (Greece) Aris)
—	DF	GRE	Manolis Tzanakakis (on loan to (Greece) Ergotelis))
—	MF	GRE	Andreas Bouchalakis (on loan to (Greece) Ergotelis))
—	FW	GRE	Dimitrios Diamantakos (on loan to (Greece) Ergotelis))
—	DF	GRE	Konstantinos Rougalas (on loan to (Greece) Ergotelis))
—	MF	GRE	Dimitris Kolovos (on loan to (Greece) Panionios))
—	GK	GRE	Andreas Gianniotis (on loan to (Greece) Glyfada)
—	MF	GRE	Ioannis Paidakis (on loan to (Greece) Glyfada)
—	GK	GRE	Aris Vlachos (on loan to (Greece) Vataniakos)
—	MF	GRE	Giorgos Lyras (on loan to (Greece) Vataniakos)

== Panathinaikos ==
In: Note: Flags indicate national team as defined under FIFA eligibility rules; some limited exceptions apply. Players may hold more than one non-FIFA nationality.

No.	Pos.	Nation	Player
—	MF	SWE	Emir Bajrami (from (France) AS Monaco)
—	DF	GRE	Georgios Koutroumpis (from AEK Athens)
—	MF	NED	Mendes da Silva (from (Austria) Red Bull Salzburg)
—	FW	SWE	Marcus Berg (from (Germany) Hamburger SV)
—	DF	ESP	Nano (from (Spain) Ponferradina)
—	FW	URU	Adrián Balboa (from (Uruguay) Cerrito)

Out: Note: Flags indicate national team as defined under FIFA eligibility rules; some limited exceptions apply. Players may hold more than one non-FIFA nationality.

No.	Pos.	Nation	Player
—	MF	GRE	Spyros Fourlanos (to (Belgium) Club Brugge)
—	DF	FRA	Jean-Alain Boumsong (released)
—	DF	GRE	Stergos Marinos (to (Belgium) Charleroi)
—	DF	GRE	Giourkas Seitaridis (released)
—	MF	ESP	Jokin Esparza (released)
—	MF	JPN	Yohei Kajiyama (loan return to (Japan) FC Tokyo)
—	FW	NZL	Kosta Barbarouses (loan return to (Russia) Alania Vladikavkaz)
—	MF	CIV	Ibrahim Sissoko (loan return to (Germany) VfL Wolfsburg)
—	DF	NED	Nicky Kuiper (loan return to (Netherlands) Twente)
—	GK	GRE	Orestis Karnezis (to (Italy) Udinese)

== Panetolikos ==
In: Note: Flags indicate national team as defined under FIFA eligibility rules; some limited exceptions apply. Players may hold more than one non-FIFA nationality.

No.	Pos.	Nation	Player
—	GK	BRA	Rafael Bracalli (from (Portugal) Porto)
—	DF	FRA	Cyril Kali (from (Greece) Veria)
—	DF	BRA	Rodrigo Galo (on loan from (Portugal) Braga)
—	DF	PER	Carlos Ascues (from (Portugal) Benfica B)
—	DF	CMR	André Bikey (from (England) Middlesbrough)
—	MF	GRE	Alexandros Kalogeris (from (Greece) Veria)
—	MF	ARG	Fernando Godoy (from (Argentina) Independiente)
—	MF	GRE	Giorgos Theodoridis (from (Cyprus) Apollon Limassol)
—	FW	GRE	Ilias Ioannou (from (Greece) Veria)
—	FW	ARG	Mauro Poy (from (Greece) Levadiakos)

Out: Note: Flags indicate national team as defined under FIFA eligibility rules; some limited exceptions apply. Players may hold more than one non-FIFA nationality.

No.	Pos.	Nation	Player
—	DF	GRE	Nikos Arabatzis (released)
—	MF	GRE	Alexandros Zeris (released)
—	MF	GRE	Giorgos Iordanidis (released)
—	FW	GRE	Evgenios Kitsas (released)
—	DF	GRE	Giorgos Tzintzis (released)
—	GK	GRE	Dimitrios Tsapalos (released)
—	DF	GRE	Giannis Ioannou (to (Greece) Panegialios F.C.)
—	MF	GRE	Pavlos Mitropoulos (on loan to (Greece) Panionios F.C.)
—	GK	GRE	Antonis Kelaidis (on loan to (Greece) Episkopi F.C.)
—	MF	ARG	Lucas Favalli (to (Argentina) Instituto Atlético Central Córdoba)
—	MF	SRB	Vladimir Bogdanović (to (Azerbaijan) AZAL PFK)
—	MF	BUL	Hristo Yanev (to (Bulgaria) PFC Slavia Sofia)
—	FW	SVN	Mirnes Sisic (released)
—	FW	BEL	Patrick Dimbala (to (Greece) AEL Kalloni)

== Panionios ==
In: Note: Flags indicate national team as defined under FIFA eligibility rules; some limited exceptions apply. Players may hold more than one non-FIFA nationality.

No.	Pos.	Nation	Player
—	DF	GRE	Kosmas Gezos (Return From Ioan Glyfada)
—	DF	GRE	Pantelis Pozidis (Return From Ioan Vyzas Megaron)
—	FW	GRE	Kostas Stavrothanasopoulos (Return From Ioan Thrasyvoulos Fylis)
—	FW	GRE	Panagiotis Kalogiannis (Return From Ioan Thrasyvoulos Fylis)
—	MF	URU	Claudio Rivero (from (Uruguay) Fénix)
—	MF	AUT	Andreas Lasnik (from (Netherlands) Breda)

Out: Note: Flags indicate national team as defined under FIFA eligibility rules; some limited exceptions apply. Players may hold more than one non-FIFA nationality.

No.	Pos.	Nation	Player

== Panthrakikos ==
In: Note: Flags indicate national team as defined under FIFA eligibility rules; some limited exceptions apply. Players may hold more than one non-FIFA nationality.

No.	Pos.	Nation	Player

Out: Note: Flags indicate national team as defined under FIFA eligibility rules; some limited exceptions apply. Players may hold more than one non-FIFA nationality.

No.	Pos.	Nation	Player
—	FW	GRE	Dimitrios Papadopoulos (to Atromitos)
—	DF	GRE	Giannis Stathis (to OFI)
—	FW	ARG	Juan Manuel Munafo (to Asteras Tripolis)

== PAOK ==
In: Note: Flags indicate national team as defined under FIFA eligibility rules; some limited exceptions apply. Players may hold more than one non-FIFA nationality.

No.	Pos.	Nation	Player
—	DF	GRE	Ioannis Skondras (from Atromitos)
—	MF	GRE	Alexandros Tziolis (from (France) AS Monaco)
—	MF	GRE	Nikos Spyropoulos (from (Italy) Chievo)
—	FW	LBR	Sekou Oliseh (on loan from (Russia) CSKA Moscow)
—	DF	ESP	Íñigo López (from (Spain) Granada)
—	DF	POR	Miguel Vítor (from (Portugal) Benfica)
—	FW	CZE	Tomáš Necid (on loan from (Russia) CSKA Moscow)
—	FW	ESP	Lucas Pérez (from (Ukraine) Karpaty Lviv)
—	FW	SVK	Miroslav Stoch (on loan from (Turkey) Fenerbahçe)
—	DF	GRE	Giorgos Tzavellas (from (France) AS Monaco)
—	MF	GRE	Sotiris Ninis (on loan from (Italy) Parma F.C.)

Out: Note: Flags indicate national team as defined under FIFA eligibility rules; some limited exceptions apply. Players may hold more than one non-FIFA nationality.

No.	Pos.	Nation	Player
—	GK	CMR	Charles Itandje (on loan to (Turkey) Torku Konyaspor)
—	DF	GRE	Christos Intzidis (on loan to Platanias)
—	DF	BRA	Etto (released)
—	DF	GRE	Alexis Apostolopoulos (on loan to Veria)
—	DF	CRO	Gordon Schildenfeld (loan return to (Russia) Dynamo Moscow)
—	DF	GRE	Kostas Stafylidis (loan return to (Germany) Bayer Leverkusen)
—	DF	RSA	Bongani Khumalo (loan return to (England) Tottenham Hotspur)
—	MF	GRE	Georgios Fotakis (released)
—	MF	FRA	Bertrand Robert (released)
—	MF	GRE	Kostas Panagiotoudis (on loan to Panionios)
—	MF	GRE	Dimitris Popovic (on loan to Panionios)
—	FW	GUI	Abdoul Camara (loan return to (France) Sochaux)

== PAS Giannina ==
In: Note: Flags indicate national team as defined under FIFA eligibility rules; some limited exceptions apply. Players may hold more than one non-FIFA nationality.

No.	Pos.	Nation	Player
36	MF	NED	Charlton Vicento (from (Netherlands) ADO Den Haag)
19	MF	ARG	Tomas De Vincenti (loan from Olympiacos)
1	GK	GRE	Markos Vellidis (from Aris)
77	GK	GRE	Dimitrios Sotiriou (from (Cyprus) Ermis Aradippou)
10	MF	ARG	Cristian Chávez (from (Italy) Napoli)
40	GK	GRE	Georgios Abaris (from (Romania) U Cluj)
44	DF	GRE	Apostolos Skondras (from AEL)
57	FW	GRE	Petros Topouzis (loan return from Anagennisi Epanomi)
25	FW	GRE	Tasos Kritikos (from AEL)
23	DF	SVN	Andraž Struna (from (Poland) KS Cracovia)

Out: Note: Flags indicate national team as defined under FIFA eligibility rules; some limited exceptions apply. Players may hold more than one non-FIFA nationality.

No.	Pos.	Nation	Player
1	GK	MAR	Karim Fegrouche (to (Cyprus) AEL Limassol)
4	DF	GRE	Marios Ikonomou (to (Italy) Cagliari)
5	DF	GRE	Anastasios Pantos (retired)
17	MF	GRE	Fotis Georgiou (to Atromitos)
10	MF	ARG	Tomas De Vincenti (to Olympiacos)
57	FW	GRE	Petros Topouzis (to Pefki)
66	GK	GRE	Apostolis Bakolas (Released)
89	GK	GRE	Nikos Babaniotis (to Ionikos)
77	MF	GRE	Kostas Pappas (Released)
23	MF	GRE	Giorgos Niklitsiotis (Released)
13	GK	GRE	Charalambos Tabasis (retired)

== Platanias ==
In: Note: Flags indicate national team as defined under FIFA eligibility rules; some limited exceptions apply. Players may hold more than one non-FIFA nationality.

No.	Pos.	Nation	Player
—	DF	GRE	Christos Intzidis (on loan from PAOK)
—	GK	CYP	Antonis Georgallides (from (Cyprus) Alki Larnaca)
—	DF	POR	Emídio Rafael (from (Portugal) Braga)
—	DF	POR	Vasco Fernandes (from (Portugal) Olhanense)

Out: Note: Flags indicate national team as defined under FIFA eligibility rules; some limited exceptions apply. Players may hold more than one non-FIFA nationality.

No.	Pos.	Nation	Player
—	DF	GRE	Giannis Potouridis (loan return to Olympiacos)

== Skoda Xanthi ==
In: Note: Flags indicate national team as defined under FIFA eligibility rules; some limited exceptions apply. Players may hold more than one non-FIFA nationality.

No.	Pos.	Nation	Player
—	DF	GRE	Stavros Stathakis (loan return from (Cyprus) Enosis Neon Paralimni)
—	GK	GRE	Dimitris Kyriakidis (from Levadiakos)
—	GK	ESP	Chema (from (Spain) Xerez)
—	DF	CIV	Steve Gohouri (from (Israel) Maccabi Tel Aviv)
—	FW	ARG	Esteban Solari (from (Cyprus) Apollon Limassol)
—	MF	POR	Dani Soares (from (Portugal) Vitória de Setúbal)

Out: Note: Flags indicate national team as defined under FIFA eligibility rules; some limited exceptions apply. Players may hold more than one non-FIFA nationality.

No.	Pos.	Nation	Player
—	GK	RUS	Juri Lodigin (to (Russia) Zenit Saint Petersburg)

== Veria ==
In: Note: Flags indicate national team as defined under FIFA eligibility rules; some limited exceptions apply. Players may hold more than one non-FIFA nationality.

No.	Pos.	Nation	Player
9	FW	SRB	Miljan Mrdaković (from (Cyprus) Enosis Neon Paralimni)
8	DF	SRB	Branko Ostojić (from (Serbia) Javor)
18	MF	PAN	Julio Segundo (from (Latvia) Skonto)
31	FW	FRA	El Fardou Ben Nabouhane (from (France) Vannes OC)
88	DF	FRA	Mohamadou Sissoko (from (Scotland) Kilmarnock)
16	MF	CZE	Petr Trapp (from (Czech Republic) Viktoria Plzeň)
10	MF	POR	Filipe da Costa (from (Greece) Panserraikos)
90	MF	POR	Zézinho (on loan from (Portugal) Sporting CP)
79	GK	GRE	Nikolaos Anastasopoulos (from (Greece) Kerkyra)
25	DF	GRE	Alexandros Apostolopoulos (On loan from (Greece) PAOK)
22	DF	GRE	Stefanos Siontis (from (Cyprus) Doxa Katokopias)
18	DF	GRE	Evangelos Ikonomou (from (Scotland) Ross County)
3	DF	GRE	Giannis Sentementes (from (Greece) Rouvas)
—	FW	GRE	Panagiotis Plavoukos (from (Greece) Thrasyvoulos)

Out: Note: Flags indicate national team as defined under FIFA eligibility rules; some limited exceptions apply. Players may hold more than one non-FIFA nationality.

No.	Pos.	Nation	Player
—	GK	GRE	Iosif Daskalakis (to OFI)
—	DF	GRE	Nikolaos Georgeas (to AEK)
—	MF	GRE	Alexandros Kalogeris (to Panetolikos)
—	FW	GRE	Ilias Ioannou (to Panetolikos)
—	MF	GRE	Pantelis Kafes (released)
—	FW	GRE	Giorgos Skatharoudis (released)
—	DF	GRE	Evangelos Ikonomou (released)
—	DF	FRA	Cyril Kali (to Panetolikos)
—	FW	NGA	Michael Olaitan (to Olympiacos)
—	FW	HON	Carlo Costly (to Guizhou Zhicheng)
—	MF	ESP	Carlinos (released)
—	DF	ARG	David Reano (released)
—	MF	ARG	Aldo Duscher (released)
—	DF	HAI	Frantz Bertin (released)
—	FW	CMR	Marcus Mokaké (released)
—	FW	MEX	Pedro Arce (released)
—	DF	BRA	Everton Santos Bezerra (released)

== See also ==
- (India) I-League transfers for the 2013–14 season
- (Bulgaria) List of Bulgarian football transfers summer 2013
- (Cyprus) List of Cypriot football transfers summer 2013
- (Netherlands) List of Dutch football transfers summer 2013
- (England) List of English football transfers summer 2013
- (Malta) List of Maltese football transfers summer 2013
- (Germany) List of German football transfers summer 2013
- (Portugal) List of Portuguese football transfers summer 2013
- (Spain) List of Spanish football transfers summer 2013
- (Latvia) List of Latvian football transfers summer 2013
- (Serbia) List of Serbian football transfers summer 2013
