= 2013–14 Veria F.C. season =

Veria
2013–14 season
- Chairman: Georgios Arvanitidis
- Manager: Goran Stevanović (7 July 2013–27 Aug 2013); Ton Caanen (1 Sept 2013–29 Sept 2013); Ștefan Stoica (8 Oct 2013–31 Oct 2017); Ratko Dostanić (16 Nov 2013–30 Jun 2014)
- Stadium: Veria Stadium, Veria
- Super League: 15th
- Greek Cup: Second round
- Top goalscorer: League: Ben Nabouhane (15 goals); All: Ben Nabouhane (15 goals)
- Highest home attendance: 5,401 (vs PAOK)
- Lowest home attendance: 514 (vs OFI)

2013–14 Veria will compete in the following competitions Super League Greece and Greek Cup.

== Players ==
=== Squad information ===
No.	Name	Nationality	Position (s)	Date of birth (age)	Signed from
Goalkeepers
1	Georgios Kantimiris	(Greece)	GK	19 September 1982 (31)	(Greece) Fokikos
30	Dimitris Kottaridis	(Greece)	GK	29 May 1981 (32)	(Greece) Kozani
55	Jonathan López	(Spain)	GK	16 April 1981 (32)	(Spain) Burgos
79	Nikolaos Anastasopoulos	(Greece)	GK	5 August 1979 (34)	(Greece) Kerkyra
Defenders
4	Nikos Tzimogiannis	(Greece)	CB	17 November 1987 (26)	Youth system
6	Konstantinos Barbas	(Greece)	CB/DM	22 April 1983 (30)	(Greece) Agrotikos Asteras
23	Dimitrios Amarantidis	(Greece)	LB	27 July 1986 (27)	(Greece) AEK Athens
25	Alexandros Apostolopoulos	(Greece)	RB	7 November 1991 (22)	(Greece) PAOK
74	Angelos Vertzos	(Greece)	LB/CB	27 May 1983 (30)	(Greece) Apollon Smyrnis
77	Nikolaos Georgiadis	(Greece)	RB	23 March 1983 (30)	(Greece) AO Diagoras
88	Mohamadou Sissoko	(France)	CB	8 August 1988 (25)	(Scotland) Kilmarnock
Midfielders
5	Guillermo	(Spain)	CM/AM	11 January 1987 (27)	(Spain) Sporting de Gijón
7	Nikos Kaltsas	(Greece)	RW/AM/CF	3 May 1990 (23)	Youth system
8	Branko Ostojić	(Serbia)	DM/CM	3 January 1984 (30)	(Serbia) Javor
10	Pavel Komolov	(Russia)	AM	10 March 1989 (24)	(Lithuania) Žalgiris Vilnius
11	Kenan Bargan	(Greece)	LW/AM/CF	25 October 1988 (25)	(Greece) Odysseas Anagennisi
15	Stefanos Siontis	(Greece)	DM	4 September 1987 (26)	(Cyprus) Doxa Katokopias
16	Petr Trapp	(Czech Republic)	DM	6 December 1985 (28)	(Czech Republic) Viktoria Plzeň
18	Julio Segundo	(Panama)	RW	26 September 1993 (20)	(Latvia) Skonto
19	Alexandros Vergonis	(Greece)	CM	1 December 1985 (28)	(Greece) Rodos
24	Esmaël Gonçalves	(Portugal)	LW/RW/CF	25 June 1991 (22)	(Cyprus) APOEL
32	Charalampos Pavlidis	(Greece)	AM	6 May 1991 (22)	Youth system
39	Ben Nabouhane	(France)	AM/CF	10 June 1989 (24)	(France) Vannes
90	Zézinho	(Guinea-Bissau)	AM	12 August 1994 (18)	(Portugal) Sporting CP
Forwards
17	Stefanos Ntogos	(Greece)	CF	5 May 1994 (19)	Youth system
20	Panagiotis Plavoukos	(Greece)	CF	21 October 1994 (19)	(Greece) Thrasyvoulos
33	Dimitris Manos	(Greece)	CF	16 September 1994 (19)	Youth system
--	Dimitris Melikiotis	(Greece)	CF	10 July 1996 (17)	Youth system

Last updated: 13 January 2014
Source: Squad at Veria FC official website

=== Transfers ===
==== Summer transfers ====
In: Note: Flags indicate national team as defined under FIFA eligibility rules; some limited exceptions apply. Players may hold more than one non-FIFA nationality.

No.	Pos.	Nation	Player
—	FW	SRB	Miljan Mrdaković (from (Cyprus) Enosis Neon Paralimni)
—	MF	SRB	Branko Ostojić (from (Serbia) Javor)
—	MF	PAN	Julio Segundo (from (Latvia) Skonto)
—	FW	FRA	El Fardou Ben Nabouhane (from (France) Vannes OC)
—	DF	FRA	Mohamadou Sissoko (from (Scotland) Kilmarnock)
—	MF	CZE	Petr Trapp (on loan from (Czech Republic) Viktoria Plzeň)
—	MF	POR	Filipe da Costa (from (Greece) Panserraikos)
—	MF	GBS	Zézinho (on loan from (Portugal) Sporting CP)
—	GK	GRE	Nikolaos Anastasopoulos (from (Greece) Kerkyra)
—	DF	GRE	Alexandros Apostolopoulos (On loan from (Greece) PAOK)
—	DF	GRE	Stefanos Siontis (from (Cyprus) Doxa Katokopias)
—	DF	GRE	Evangelos Ikonomou (from (Scotland) Ross County)
—	DF	GRE	Giannis Sentementes (from (Greece) Rouvas)
—	FW	GRE	Panagiotis Plavoukos (from (Greece) Thrasyvoulos)

Out: Note: Flags indicate national team as defined under FIFA eligibility rules; some limited exceptions apply. Players may hold more than one non-FIFA nationality.

No.	Pos.	Nation	Player
—	GK	GRE	Iosif Daskalakis (to OFI)
—	DF	GRE	Nikolaos Georgeas (to AEK Athens)
—	MF	GRE	Alexandros Kalogeris (to Panetolikos)
—	FW	GRE	Ilias Ioannou (to Panetolikos)
—	MF	GRE	Pantelis Kafes (released)
—	FW	GRE	Giorgos Skatharoudis (released)
—	DF	GRE	Evangelos Ikonomou (released)
—	DF	FRA	Cyril Kali (to Panetolikos)
—	FW	NGR	Michael Olaitan (to Olympiacos)
—	FW	HON	Carlo Costly (to Guizhou Zhicheng)
—	MF	ESP	Carlinos (released)
—	DF	ARG	David Reano (released)
—	MF	ARG	Aldo Duscher (released)
—	DF	HAI	Frantz Bertin (released)
—	FW	CMR	Marcus Mokaké (released)
—	FW	MEX	Pedro Arce (released)
—	DF	BRA	Everton Santos Bezerra (released)

==== Winter transfers ====
In: Note: Flags indicate national team as defined under FIFA eligibility rules; some limited exceptions apply. Players may hold more than one non-FIFA nationality.

No.	Pos.	Nation	Player
—	DF	GRE	Angelos Vertzos (from (Greece) Apollon Smyrnis)
—	FW	POR	Esmaël Gonçalves (on loan from (Portugal) Rio Ave)
—	MF	RUS	Pavel Komolov (on loan from (Lithuania) Žalgiris Vilnius)
—	MF	GHA	Albert Bruce (on trial from (Ghana) Asante Kotoko)

Out: Note: Flags indicate national team as defined under FIFA eligibility rules; some limited exceptions apply. Players may hold more than one non-FIFA nationality.

No.	Pos.	Nation	Player
—	DF	GRE	Giannis Sentementes (released)
—	DF	GRE	Evangelos Ikonomou (to (Scotland) Ross County)
—	MF	POR	Filipe da Costa (to (Greece) Panachaiki)
—	FW	SRB	Miljan Mrdaković (released)
—	DF	BRA	Orestes (to (Qatar) Al-Arabi)
—	FW	GRE	Panagiotis Plavoukos (On loan to (Greece) Asteras Magoulas)
—	MF	PAN	Julio Segundo (On loan to (Panama) Independiente)

== Super League Greece ==
17 August 2013 Match 1	Platanias	2 – 2	Veria	Platanias
19:15	Thomas Nazlidis 29'; Goundoulakis 42'; Stoller (yellow card) 60'; Emídio Rafael (yellow card) 79'	Summary	Apostolopoulos (yellow card) 12' (yellow-red card); Alexandros Vergonis (yellow card) 13'; Mrdaković 62', 85'; Trapp (yellow card) 80'	Stadium: Perivolia Municipal Stadium; Attendance: 2,121; Referee: (Greece) Georgios Daskalopoulos

24 August 2013 Match 2	Veria	2 – 0	OFI	Veria
19:15	Konstantinos Barbas (yellow card) 4'; El Fardou Ben Nabouhane 67'; Orestes (yellow card) 76'; Mrdaković 82'	Summary	Zvasiya (yellow card) 6'; Galletti (yellow card) 83'	Stadium: Veria Stadium; Attendance: 514; Referee: (Greece) Andreas Pappas

31 August 2013 Match 3	Panathinaikos	1 – 1	Veria	Athens
21:30	Zeca (yellow card) 25'; Abeid 44'; Marinakis (yellow card) 90'; Triantafyllopoulos (yellow card) 90+4'	Summary	Georgiadis (yellow card) 39'; Ben Nabouhane 54'; Ostojić (yellow card) 58'	Stadium: Leoforos Alexandras Stadium; Attendance: 8,615; Referee: (Greece) Christos Mitsios

14 September 2013 Match 4	Veria	1 – 2	PAOK	Veria
18:15	Dimitrios Amarantidis (yellow card) 21'; Mrdaković (yellow card) 29' (goal) 83'; Georgiadis (yellow card) 54'; Anastasopoulos (yellow card) 67'	Summary	Miguel Vítor 18'; Jacobo (yellow card) 29'; Tziolis (yellow card) 42'; Katsouranis (yellow card) 47'; Lucas (yellow card) 50'; Stoch 66'	Stadium: Veria Stadium; Attendance: 5,401; Referee: (Greece) Alexander Aretopoulos

22 September 2013 Match 5	Panthrakikos	1 – 0	Veria	Komotini
18:15	Igor 42'; Ladakis (yellow card) 64'	Summary	Amarantidis (yellow card) 8'; Bargan (yellow card) 65'; Barbas (yellow card) 69' (yellow-red card)	Stadium: Komotini Municipal Stadium; Attendance: 1,730; Referee: (Greece) Georgis Kizas

28 September 2013 Match 6	Veria	0 – 1	Ergotelis	Veria
18:15	Kaltsas (yellow card) 25'; Georgiadis (yellow card) 37'; Orestes (yellow card) 51'; Barbas (yellow card) 75'	Summary	Tzanakakis (yellow card) 13'; Chrysovalantis Kozoronis (yellow card) 43'; Chanti 51' (pen.) (yellow card) 90+2'; Pelé (yellow card) 74'	Stadium: Veria Stadium; Attendance: 620; Referee: (Greece) Ilias Spathas

6 October 2013 Match 7	Olympiacos	6 – 0	Veria	Piraeus
16:00	Mitroglou 8', 20', 81' (yellow card) 85'; Maniatis (yellow card) 36' (goal) 71'; Campbell 63', 82'	Summary	Barbas (yellow card) 68'	Stadium: Karaiskakis Stadium; Attendance: 17,003; Referee: (Greece) Ioannis Kabaxis

20 October 2013 Match 8	Veria	0 – 1	Aris	Veria
16:00	Kaltsas (yellow card) 37'; Siontis (yellow card) 43'; Ostojić (yellow card) 48'; Georgiadis (yellow card) 80'; Anastasopoulos (yellow card) 90+3'	Summary	Iraklis (yellow card) 10'; Tatos (yellow card) 13'; Economopoulos (yellow card) 13' (yellow-red card); Udoji 61'	Stadium: Veria Stadium; Referee: (Greece) Milhail Voskakis

27 October 2013 Match 9	Veria	2 – 2	PAS Giannina	Veria
17:15	Mrdaković (yellow card) 19'; Kaltsas 32'; Bargan 39'; Manos (yellow card) 90+4'	Summary	Ilić 5'; Korovesis (yellow card) 15' (goal) 29'; Tzimopoulos (yellow card) 33'; Michail (yellow card) 44'; Lila (yellow card) 48' (yellow-red card); Dasios (yellow card) 87'	Stadium: Veria Stadium; Attendance: 1,775; Referee: (Greece) Stavros Mantalos

3 November 2013 Match 10	Apollon Smyrnis	0 – 0	Veria	Athens
17:15	Christos Mingas (yellow card) 10'; Delizisis (yellow card) 48'; Korbos (yellow card) 53'; Paolo Farinola (yellow card) 83'	Summary	Sissoko (yellow card) 48'; Amarantidis (yellow card) 61'; Ostojić (yellow card) 69'; Bargan (yellow card) 90+1'; Jonathan López (yellow card) 90+3'	Stadium: Georgios Kamaras Stadium; Attendance: 885; Referee: (Greece) Ioannis Kabaxis

10 November 2013 Match 11	Veria	0 – 3	AEL Kalloni	Veria
17:15	Bargan (yellow card) 45+1'; Georgiadis (yellow card) 60'; Zézinho (yellow card) 75'	Summary	Jonan García 6'; Podaný 27'; Anastasiadis (yellow card) 32'; Manousos (yellow card) 53'; Hugo Faria (yellow card) 60'; Hogg (yellow card) 68'; Leozinho 79'	Stadium: Veria Stadium; Attendance: 1,310; Referee: (Greece) Anastasios Papapetrou

23 November 2013 Match 12	Atromitos	1 – 0	Veria	Peristeri
17:15	Thanasis Karagounis 43'; Stathis Tavlaridis (yellow card) 86'	Summary	Bargan (yellow card) 45+1'; Dimitrios Amarantidis (yellow card) 74'; Nikos Tzimogiannis (yellow card) 83'; Mohamadou Sissoko (yellow card) 89'	Stadium: Peristeri Stadium; Attendance: 1,395; Referee: (Greece) Marios Labropoulos

1 December 2013 Match 13	Veria	4 – 3	Levadiakos	Veria
17:15	Miljan Mrdaković 51'; Nikolaos Kaltsas 63'; Pedro Sass Petrazzi 70' (o.g.); Ben Nabouhane 79'; Charalampos Pavlidis (yellow card) 83'; Petr Trapp (yellow card) 87'; Nikolaos Georgiadis (yellow card) 90+4'	Summary	Rodrigo Sanguinetti 3'; Armiche Ortega 60'; Pedro Sass Petrazzi (yellow card) 65'; Rogério Gonçalves Martins (yellow card) 88'; Olivier Kapo 90+1'	Stadium: Veria Stadium; Attendance: 1,232; Referee: (Greece) Andreas Pappas

8 December 2013 Match 14	Skoda Xanthi	3 – 0	Veria	Xanthi
17:15	Triadis 1'; Fliskas (yellow card) 43'; Baxevanidis (yellow card) 61'; Solari 76' (pen.); Dié (yellow card) 82'; Mantalos 84'	Summary	Orestes (yellow card) 35'; Georgiadis (yellow card) 41'	Stadium: Skoda Xanthi Arena; Referee: (Greece) Georgios Kominis

15 December 2013 Match 15	Veria	1 – 0	Panetolikos	Veria
17:15	Amarantidis (yellow card) 43'; Ben Nabouhane 71'; Trapp (yellow card) 77'; Siontis (yellow card) 80'; Georgiadis (yellow card) 89'	Summary	Bellón (yellow card) 37'; Rafael Bracalli (yellow card) 62'; Papoutsogiannopoulos (yellow card) 63'	Stadium: Veria Stadium; Attendance: 1,242; Referee: (Greece) Konstantinos Ioannidis

19 December 2013 Match 16	Panionios	2 – 1	Veria	Nea Smyrni
17:15	Aravidis 22', 84'; Kampantais (yellow card) 45+1'; Avlonitis (yellow card) 88'	Summary	Sissoko (yellow card) 26' (yellow-red card); Ben Nabouhane 45+2' (pen.) (yellow card) 90+2'; Kaltsas (yellow card) 59'; Siontis (yellow card) 72'	Stadium: Nea Smyrni Stadium; Attendance: 590; Referee: (Greece) Michael Koukoulakis

22 December 2013 Match 17	Asteras Tripolis	0 – 0	Veria	Tripoli, Greece
17:15	Zisopoulos (yellow card) 56'; Zaradoukas (yellow card) 87'	Summary	Ostojić (yellow card) 81'; Kantimiris (yellow card) 82'; Barbas (yellow card) 90+4'	Stadium: Theodoros Kolokotronis Stadium; Attendance: 1,530; Referee: (Greece) Georgios Daskalopoulos

5 January 2014 Match 18	Veria	2 – 2	Platanias	Veria
17:15	Barbas (yellow card) 8' (goal) 76'; Ben Nabouhane 22'; Ostojić (yellow card) 45+1'; Amarantidis (yellow card) 57' (yellow-red card)	Summary	Dimitris (yellow card) 4'; Katai 44'; David Arenas Torres 66'; Mendrinos (yellow card) 84'; Intzidis (yellow card) 90+4'	Stadium: Veria Stadium; Attendance: 1,268; Referee: (Greece) Andreas Pappas

11 January 2014 Match 19	OFI	0 – 1	Veria	Heraklion
15:00	Bourbos (yellow card) 73' (yellow-red card); Moniakis (yellow card) 79'; Zoro (red card) 81'; Konstantinos Banousis (yellow card) 87'	Summary	Georgiadis (yellow card) 38'; Ben Nabouhane 85'; Zézinho (yellow card) 86'	Stadium: Theodoros Vardinogiannis Stadium; Attendance: 4,030; Referee: (Greece) Ioannis Delfakis

19 January 2014 Match 20	Veria	1 – 3	Panathinaikos	Veria
19:30	Ben Nabouhane 10' (pen.); Barbas (yellow card) 52'; Kaltsas (yellow card) 80'	Summary	Klonaridis 2' (yellow card) 58'; Kapino (yellow card) 8'; Ajagun 34'; Berg (yellow card) 40' (goal) 68'	Stadium: Veria Stadium; Attendance: 3,161; Referee: (Greece) Georgios Liahoudis

26 January 2014 Match 21	PAOK	4 – 1	Veria	Thessaloniki
17:15	Oliseh 1'; Maduro 5' (yellow card) 22'; Salpingidis 13', 66'; Katsouranis (yellow card) 68'	Summary	Bargan (yellow card) 40'; Esmaël Gonçalves 56'; Amarantidis (yellow card) 59'; Ben Nabouhane (yellow card) 87'	Stadium: Toumba Stadium; Attendance: 5,268; Referee: (Greece) Stavros Tritsonis

2 February 2014 Match 22	Veria	0 – 0	Panthrakikos	Veria
17:15	Amarantidis (yellow card) 40'; Pavlidis (yellow card) 64'	Summary	Alexandros Paschalakis (red card) 4'; Papageorgiou (yellow card) 43'; Giorgos Athanasiadis (yellow card) 66'	Stadium: Veria Stadium; Attendance: 991; Referee: (Greece) Alexander Aretopoulos

5 February 2014 Match 23	Ergotelis	2 – 0	Veria	Heraklion
15:00	Diamantakos 56'; Cardozo (yellow card) 79'; Badibanga 86'; Chrysovalantis Kozoronis (yellow card) 90'	Summary	Esmaël Gonçalves (yellow card) 61'	Stadium: Pankritio Stadium; Attendance: 1,252; Referee: (Greece) Dimitrios Thanos

8 February 2014 Match 24	Veria	0 – 5	Olympiacos	Veria
19:30		Summary	Domínguez 59'; Pérez 69'; Olaitan 70', 90+2'; Maniatis 85'; Iván Marcano (yellow card) 90'	Stadium: Veria Stadium; Attendance: 2,282; Referee: (Greece) Apostolos Amparkiolis

16 February 2014 Match 25	Aris	0 – 0	Veria	Thessaloniki
17:15	Tsiaras (yellow card) 65'; David Aganzo (yellow card) 68'	Summary	Ostojić (yellow card) 58'; Siontis (yellow card) 90'	Stadium: Kleanthis Vikelidis Stadium; Attendance: 11,429; Referee: (Greece) Christos Mitsios

23 February 2014 Match 26	PAS Giannina	0 – 1	Veria	Ioannina
17:15	Michail (yellow card) 81'; Berios (yellow card) 90+3'	Summary	Georgiadis (yellow card) 56'; Amarantidis (yellow card) 56'; Vertzos (yellow card) 60'; Bargan (yellow card) 74'; Ben Nabouhane 90+1'	Stadium: Zosimades Stadium; Attendance: 1,687; Referee: (Greece) Georgios Daskalopoulos

1 March 2014 Match 27	Veria	1 – 1	Apollon Smyrnis	Veria
17:15	Kaltsas (yellow card) 24'; Ben Nabouhane 43'; Vertzos (yellow card) 77'	Summary	Söderberg (yellow card) 49'; Delizisis (yellow card) 55'; Petropoulos 63'; Tsokanis (yellow card) 75'; Chatzizisis (yellow card) 78'	Stadium: Veria Stadium; Attendance: 963; Referee: (Greece) Georgios Kominis

10 March 2014 Match 28	AEL Kalloni	0 – 3	Veria	Mytilene
19:30	Marcelo Goianira (yellow card) 43'; Keita (yellow card) 60'; Fourlanos (yellow card) 78'; Hogg (yellow card) 84'; Raúl Llorente (yellow card) 87'	Summary	Sissoko (yellow card) 14' (yellow-red card); Ben Nabouhane 43', 86' 85' (pen.); Kaltsas (yellow card) 46'; Barbas (yellow card) 90+3'	Attendance: 66; Referee: (Greece) Stavros Tritsonis

15 March 2014 Match 29	Veria	1 – 1	Atromitos	Veria
15:00	Amarantidis (yellow card) 14'; Ben Nabouhane 90' (pen.)	Summary	Umbides 14' (pen.); Papadopoulos (yellow card) 19'; Pitu (yellow card) 90+5'	Stadium: Veria Stadium; Attendance: 964; Referee: (Greece) Michael Koukoulakis

23 March 2014 Match 30	Levadiakos	2 – 0	Veria	Livadeia
17:15	Koné (yellow card) 55' (goal) 56'; Pedro Sass Petrazzi (yellow card) 85'; Charalambous (yellow card) 90+4'; Mantzios 90+6'	Summary	Kaltsas (yellow card) 16'; Ben Nabouhane (yellow card) 35' (yellow-red card); Barbas (yellow card) 85'	Stadium: Levadia Municipal Stadium; Attendance: 1,070; Referee: (Greece) Alexander Aretopoulos

26 March 2014 Match 31	Veria	3 – 2	Skoda Xanthi	Veria
15:00	Ostojić 5' (yellow card) 67' (yellow-red card); Vergonis (yellow card) 50'; Bargan 58'; Pavlidis 70'; Amarantidis (yellow card) 78'	Summary	Vasilakakis (yellow card) 5' (yellow-red card) (goal) 33'; Triadis (yellow card) 22'; Josemi (yellow card) 74'; Marin (yellow card) 79'; Nakas 90+4'	Stadium: Veria Stadium; Attendance: 717; Referee: (Greece) Ilias Spathas

29 March 2014 Match 32	Panetolikos	0 – 0	Veria	Agrinio
15:00	Camara (yellow card) 32'; Kousas (yellow card) 55'	Summary		Stadium: Panetolikos Stadium; Attendance: 2,824; Referee: (Greece) Dimitrios Thanos

6 April 2014 Match 33	Veria	2 – 1	Panionios	Veria
19:00	Amarantidis (yellow card) 17' (yellow-red card); Ben Nabouhane 37'; Ostojić (yellow card) 50'; Esmaël Gonçalves 54'; Bargan (yellow card) 64'; Vertzos (yellow card) 72'	Summary	Aravidis (yellow card) 33' (yellow-red card) (goal) 73' (pen.); Kouloucheris (yellow card) 68'; Mitropoulos (yellow card) 69'	Stadium: Veria Stadium; Attendance: 875; Referee: (Greece) Konstantinos Ioannidis

13 April 2014 Match 34	Veria	1 – 0	Asteras Tripolis	Veria
19:00	Vergonis 78'; Ntogos (yellow card) 88'; Kantimiris (yellow card) 90+1'; Ben Nabouhane (yellow card) 90+3'	Summary	Caffa (yellow card) 88'; N'Daw (yellow card) 90+2'	Stadium: Veria Stadium; Attendance: 1,196; Referee: (Greece) Andreas Pappas

=== League table ===
Pos	Team	Pld	W	D	L	GF	GA	GD	Pts	Qualification or relegation
13	Panionios	34	10	9	15	33	42	−9	39 (Note: Head-to-head points: AEL Kalloni 4, Panionios 1.)	
14	Platanias	34	10	8	16	39	48	−9	38 (Note: Head-to-head points: Platanias 8, Veria 5, Skoda Xanthi 3.)	
15	Veria	34	9	11	14	31	51	−20	38	
16	Skoda Xanthi	34	11	5	18	44	54	−10	38	Qualification for the Relegation play-off
17	Apollon Smyrnis (R)	34	9	9	16	43	54	−11	36	Relegation to Football League

Source: Super League Greece
Rules for classification: 1) Points; 2) Head-to-head points; 3) Head-to-head goal difference; 4) Goals scored; 5) Goals against; 6) Play-offs (neutral ground).
(Note: Criteria 6 is only used if needed to decide champion, teams for relegation or teams for UEFA competitions).
If in final league table there are still tied teams after applying criteria 1 to 5, a decision match (or matches if they are more than two) are to be played but only in three cases: to determine the champion, to fill spots in the play-off or to determine the teams to be relegated. In any other case, the final standings of tied teams are determined with a public draw.
(R) Relegated

== Greek Cup ==
25 September 2013 Round 2 First Leg	Iraklis Psachna	3 – 1	Veria	Psachna
15:30	Kritikos 37' (pen.) 54'; Dimitris Kollias 84'	Summary	Manos 72'	Stadium: Psachna Municipal Stadium; Referee: (Greece) Charalambos Kalogeropoulos

31 October 2013 Round 2 Second Leg	Veria	2 – 1 (3 – 4 agg.)	Iraklis Psachna	Veria
15:30	Mrdaković 13'; Kaltsas 87'	Summary	Orestis Nikolopoulos 33'	Stadium: Veria Stadium; Referee: (Greece) Alexander Aretopoulos

== Player statistics ==
=== Goals ===
R	Player	Position	Super League	Greek Cup	Total	Notes
1	(Comoros) Ben Nabouhane	AM/CF	15	-	15	
2	(Serbia) Miljan Mrdaković	CF	5	1	6	
3	(Greece) Nikos Kaltsas	RW/AM/CF	2	1	3	

Last updated: 18 April 2014
Source:,

=== Assists ===
R	Player	Position	Super League	Greek Cup	Total	Notes
1	(Greece) Nikos Kaltsas	RW/AM/CF	5	-	5	
2	(Comoros) Ben Nabouhane	AM/CF	3	-	3	

Last updated: 18 April 2014
