= List of Greek football transfers summer 2014 =

This is a list of Greek football transfers in the summer transfer window 2014 by club.

== AEL Kalloni ==
In: Note: Flags indicate national team as defined under FIFA eligibility rules; some limited exceptions apply. Players may hold more than one non-FIFA nationality.

No.	Pos.	Nation	Player
—	FW	SEN	Henri Camara (from Panetolikos)
—	GK	GRE	Kostas Dafkos (from Doxa Drama)
—	DF	GRE	Christos Pipinis (from (Cyprus) APOEL)
—	MF	GRE	Christos Mingas (from Apollon Smyrnis)
—	FW	ESP	Juanma (from Asteras Tripolis)
—	MF	SRB	Ljubomir Stevanović (from (North Macedonia) Metalurg Skopje)
—	DF	ARG	Marcos Barrera (from (Bolivia) The Strongest)
—	MF	ESP	Ximo Navarro (from Asteras Tripolis)
—	DF	NGA	Daniel Adejo (from (Italy) Reggina)
—	GK	SRB	Branimir Aleksić (from (Serbia) Spartak Subotica)
—	MF	GRE	Giannis Giorgou (from Youth system)
—	MF	GHA	Abdul Razak (from Syros)
—	MF	GRE	Savvas Tsabouris (from Asteras Tripolis)

Out: Note: Flags indicate national team as defined under FIFA eligibility rules; some limited exceptions apply. Players may hold more than one non-FIFA nationality.

No.	Pos.	Nation	Player
—	MF	BRA	Marcelo Goianira (Free agent)
—	MF	GRE	Nikos Kalfas (Free agent)
—	MF	ALB	Xhonatan Muça (to Vataniakos)
—	MF	GRE	Zisis-Angelos Naoum (Free agent)
—	DF	FRA	Maxime Josse (Free agent)
—	FW	FRA	Guy Gnabouyou (to (Malta) Sliema Wanderers)
—	MF	ESP	Jonan García (Free agent)
—	MF	POR	Hugo Faria (to (Malta) Valletta)
—	GK	GRE	Lefteris Mappas (to Aiolikos)
—	MF	GRE	Nikos Galas (to Aiolikos)
—	GK	GRE	Giannis Siderakis (to (Cyprus) Doxa Katokopias)
—	MF	GRE	Charalambos Siligardakis (to Chania)
—	FW	GRE	Vlasis Kazakis (to Aiginiakos)
—	FW	GRE	Andreas Dambos (to Fokikos)
—	FW	ARG	Emanuel Perrone (to Iraklis)
—	FW	GRE	Kyriakos Evangelidakis (loan to Fokikos)

== Asteras Tripolis ==
In: Note: Flags indicate national team as defined under FIFA eligibility rules; some limited exceptions apply. Players may hold more than one non-FIFA nationality.

No.	Pos.	Nation	Player
—	FW	FRA	Hervaine Moukam (from (France) Metz)
—	FW	GRE	Giannis Gianniotas (on loan from (Germany) Fortuna Düsseldorf)
—	MF	CIV	Éric Tié Bi (from (France) Evian)
—	FW	ARG	Facundo Parra (from (Argentina) Independiente)
—	GK	SVK	Tomáš Košický (from (Italy) Novara)
—	DF	GRE	Athanasios Panteliadis (from (Greece) Apollon Smyrnis)
—	FW	BEL	Ziguy Badibanga (from (Greece) Ergotelis)
—	MF	BEL	Ritchie Kitoko (on loan from (Spain) Granada)
—	GK	GRE	Kostas Theodoropoulos (from (Greece) Chania)
—	MF	GRE	Tasos Tsokanis (from (Greece) Apollon Smyrnis)
—	FW	ARG	Nicolás Fernández (from (Spain) Lorca)
—	MF	ARG	Martín Rolle (on loan from (Argentina) San Lorenzo)
—	FW	ARG	Pablo Mazza (from (Argentina) Douglas Haig)
—	MF	BRA	Ederson Tormena (from (Belgium) Charleroi)

Out: Note: Flags indicate national team as defined under FIFA eligibility rules; some limited exceptions apply. Players may hold more than one non-FIFA nationality.

No.	Pos.	Nation	Player
—	FW	ARG	Mauricio Carrasco (loan return to (Argentina) Estudiantes)
—	MF	ARG	Pablo de Blasis (to (Germany) Mainz 05)
—	GK	GRE	Panagiotis Ladas (to (Greece) Iraklis)
—	DF	GRE	Giannis Kontoes (to (Greece) Atromitos)
—	DF	GRE	Christos Lisgaras (to (Greece) Skoda Xanthi)
—	FW	ARG	Sebastián Bartolini (to (Greece) Iraklis)
—	MF	ESP	Juan Manuel Delgado Lloria (to (Greece) AEL Kalloni)
—	MF	ESP	Ximo Navarro (to (Greece) AEL Kalloni)
—	FW	ARG	Sebastián Grazzini (to (Argentina) Atlético Patronato)
—	MF	GRE	Savvas Tsabouris (to (Greece) AEL Kalloni)
—	MF	SEN	Guirane N'Daw (to (France) Metz)
—	DF	ARG	Lautaro Formica (released)
—	MF	POR	Valdo (released)
—	MF	ARG	Juan Pablo Caffa (to (Uruguay) Defensor)
—	GK	VEN	Dani Hernández (loan return to (Spain) Valladolid)

== Atromitos ==
In: Note: Flags indicate national team as defined under FIFA eligibility rules; some limited exceptions apply. Players may hold more than one non-FIFA nationality.

No.	Pos.	Nation	Player
—	FW	GRE	Dimitrios Papadopoulos (from Panthrakikos)
—	GK	ITA	Luigi Cennamo (from (Israel) Maccabi Netanya)
—	GK	GRE	Michalis Sifakis (from (Belgium) Charleroi)
—	MF	GRE	Fotis Georgiou (from PAS Giannina)
—	MF	ARG	Javier Umbides (from (Turkey) Orduspor)
—	DF	GRE	Christos Arkoudas (from (Greece) AEK Athens)

Out: Note: Flags indicate national team as defined under FIFA eligibility rules; some limited exceptions apply. Players may hold more than one non-FIFA nationality.

No.	Pos.	Nation	Player
—	DF	GRE	Ioannis Skondras (to PAOK)
—	MF	BRA	Chumbinho (loan return to Olympiacos)
—	FW	FIN	Njazi Kuqi (Released)

== Ergotelis ==
In: Note: Flags indicate national team as defined under FIFA eligibility rules; some limited exceptions apply. Players may hold more than one non-FIFA nationality.

No.	Pos.	Nation	Player
—	DF	ALB	Albi Ala (loan return from Fokikos)
—	MF	GRE	Antonis Bourselis (loan return from P.A.O. Krousonas)
—	MF	GRE	Christos Chrysofakis (loan return from Panegialios)
—	MF	GRE	Konstantinos Protogerakis (loan return from P.O. Atsalenios)
—	MF	BRA	Wellington Pessoa (loan return from Panelefsiniakos)
—	FW	GRE	Ioannis Domatas (loan return from Asteras Magoula)
—	MF	GRE	Sokratis Evangelou (loan return from Ermis Zoniana)
—	GK	CZE	Tomáš Černý (from (Bulgaria) CSKA Sofia)
—	DF	ESP	Melli (from (Moldova) Sheriff Tiraspol)
—	MF	COM	Mohamed Youssouf (from (France) Amiens)
—	MF	SVN	Rok Štraus (from (Poland) Cracovia)
—	MF	GRE	Konstantinos Kaznaferis (from Platanias)
—	DF	GRE	Manolis Tzanakakis (on loan from Olympiacos)
—	FW	SRB	Aleksandar Nosković (from (Poland) Spartak Subotica)
—	MF	UKR	Andriy Bohdanov (from (Ukraine) Metalist Kharkiv)
—	MF	BRA	Alan (from (Ukraine) Bukovyna)
—	DF	GRE	Charalambos Lykogiannis (on loan from Olympiacos)
—	DF	FRA	Joris Sainati (from (France) Istres)
—	FW	GRE	Georgios Pamlidis (from Achilleas Neokaisareia)
—	MF	SRB	Nikola Stojanović (from (Serbia) Partizan)
—	DF	ISR	Ignacio Fideleff (on loan from (Italy) Napoli)
—	MF	GRE	Savvas Gentsoglou (on loan from (Italy) Sampdoria)
—	MF	GRE	Panagiotis Vlachodimos (on loan from Olympiacos)

Out: Note: Flags indicate national team as defined under FIFA eligibility rules; some limited exceptions apply. Players may hold more than one non-FIFA nationality.

No.	Pos.	Nation	Player
—	GK	GRE	Grigorios Athanasiou (to (Cyprus) Ayia Napa)
—	GK	SRB	Vladimir Stojković (to (Israel) Maccabi Haifa)
—	DF	ESP	Álvaro Mejía (to (Qatar) Al-Shahaniya)
—	MF	SVK	František Kubík (to (Slovenia) Trenčín)
—	DF	GRE	Georgios Sarris (to AEK Athens)
—	MF	BRA	Wellington Pessoa (to (Brazil) Tiradentes-CE)
—	DF	GRE	Manolis Tzanakakis (loan return to Olympiacos)
—	MF	GRE	Andreas Bouchalakis (loan return to Olympiacos)
—	MF	NOR	Abdisalam Ibrahim (loan return to Olympiacos)
—	FW	GRE	Dimitrios Diamantakos (loan return to Olympiacos)
—	FW	ITA	Gaetano Monachello (to (France) Monaco)
—	DF	NGA	Ayodele Adeleye (to OFI)
—	DF	SLE	Aziz Deen-Conteh (Released)
—	FW	GRE	Ilias Anastasakos (to AEL)
—	MF	ARG	Horacio Cardozo (to Kerkyra)
—	FW	GRE	Michalis Kouiroukidis (to Asteras Vari)
—	MF	BEL	Ziguy Badibanga (to Asteras Tripolis)
—	MF	ARG	Diego Romano (to Iraklis)
—	DF	ALB	Albi Ala (to Panachaiki)
—	MF	GRE	Konstantinos Protogerakis (to Irodotos)
—	MF	GRE	Sokratis Evangelou (loan tο Chania)
—	DF	GRE	Ioannis Kiliaras (to Irodotos)
—	FW	GRE	Ioannis Domatas (loan toto Giouchtas)

== Levadiakos ==
In: Note: Flags indicate national team as defined under FIFA eligibility rules; some limited exceptions apply. Players may hold more than one non-FIFA nationality.

No.	Pos.	Nation	Player
—	DF	GRE	Giorgos Ioannidis (from OFI)
—	MF	BRA	Pedro Sass (from (Hungary) Kaposvári Rákóczi FC)
—	MF	GRE	Giorgos Lambropoulos (from (Cyprus) Nea Salamina)
—	FW	GRE	Vangelis Mantzios (from Atromitos)
—	FW	GRE	Dimitris Giantsis (from Kerkyra)
—	MF	CIV	Emmanuel Koné (from (France) Sedan)
—	MF	ESP	Armiche (from (Spain) Valencia B)
—	MF	ESP	Manolo Martínez (from (Spain) Recreativo)
—	DF	GRE	Charalambos Lykogiannis (on loan from Olympiacos)
—	GK	GRE	Kiriakos Stratilatis (from Kerkyra)
—	FW	FRA	Olivier Kapo (from (France) Auxerre)
—	GK	POL	Sebastian Przyrowski (from Polonia Warszawa)
—	FW	SEN	Macoumba Kandji (from AEL Kalloni)
—	DF	URU	Rodrigo Sanguinetti (from (Uruguay) Central Español)

Out: Note: Flags indicate national team as defined under FIFA eligibility rules; some limited exceptions apply. Players may hold more than one non-FIFA nationality.

No.	Pos.	Nation	Player
—	FW	ARG	Mauro Poy (to Panetolikos)
—	DF	GRE	Giorgos Zisopoulos (to Asteras Tripolis)
—	DF	GRE	Christos Lisgaras (to Asteras Tripolis)

== OFI ==
In: Note: Flags indicate national team as defined under FIFA eligibility rules; some limited exceptions apply. Players may hold more than one non-FIFA nationality.

No.	Pos.	Nation	Player
—	FW	FRA	Frédéric Nimani (from (France) FC Istres)
—	MF	GRE	Michail Fragoulakis (from Asteras Tripolis)
—	DF	GRE	Theodoros Tripotseris (from Kavala)
—	DF	GRE	Giannis Stathis (from Panthrakikos)
—	DF	POR	Carlos Milhazes (from (Cyprus) Enosis Neon Paralimni)
—	GK	POR	Daniel Fernandes (from (Netherlands) Twente)
—	MF	ARG	Luciano Galletti (free agent)
—	MF	ARG	Michael Hoyos (from (Argentina) Estudiantes)
—	MF	SRB	Željko Kalajdžić (from Platanias)
—	DF	ZIM	Lincoln Zvasiya (from (South Africa) Kaizer Chiefs)
—	GK	GRE	Iosif Daskalakis (from Veria)

Out: Note: Flags indicate national team as defined under FIFA eligibility rules; some limited exceptions apply. Players may hold more than one non-FIFA nationality.

No.	Pos.	Nation	Player
—	DF	GRE	Manolis Zacharakis (to Panionios)
—	DF	GRE	Giorgos Ioannidis (to Levadiakos F.C.)
—	MF	GRE	Panagiotis Zorbas (to Kerkyra)
—	DF	SEN	Mohamed Sarr (Free Agent)
—	DF	GRE	Lazaros Charitonidis (Released)
—	MF	GRE	Pavlos Kolliakoudakis (on loan to PAO Kroussona)
—	MF	GRE	Nikomanolis Nyktaris (on loan to PAO Kroussona)

== Olympiacos ==
In:

Note: Flags indicate national team as defined under FIFA eligibility rules; some limited exceptions apply. Players may hold more than one non-FIFA nationality.

No.	Pos.	Nation	Player
—	DF	FRA	Eric Abidal (from (France) AS Monaco)( fee €1M)
—	DF	FRA	Arthur Masuaku (from (France) Valenciennes)(fee €300.00)
—	DF	NOR	Omar Elabdellaoui (from (Germany) Eintracht Braunschweig)(fee 400.000 € )
—	DF	GRE	Tasos Avlonitis (from (Greece) Panionios)( fee €0)
—	DF	ESP	Alberto Botía (from (Spain) Sevilla FC)(fee €2M)
—	MF	SUI	Pajtim Kasami (from (England) Fulham)(fee €5M)
—	MF	FRA	Mathieu Dossevi (from (France) Valenciennes)(fee €600,000)
—	MF	SWE	Jimmy Durmaz (from (Turkey) ) (fee €2M)
—	MF	ARM	Gevorg Ghazaryan (from (Ukraine) Metalurh Donetsk)(fee €0)
—	MF	GRE	Kostas Fortounis (from (Germany) 1. FC Kaiserslautern)(fee €400.00)
—	FW	GRE	Thanasis Papazoglou (from (Greece) OFI)( fee €0)
—	FW	NED	Ibrahim Afellay (from (Spain) Barcelona)(free transfer)
—	FW	PAR	Jorge Daniel Benítez (from (Paraguay) Guarani)(fee €3,5M)
—	FW	GRE	Kostas Mitroglou (on loan from (England) Fulham)
—	MF	SRB	Luka Milivojević (on loan from (Belgium) Anderlecht)(fee €600.00)
—	DF	GRE	Kostas Giannoulis (from (Greece) Atromitos F.C.)( fee €0)
—	MF	GRE	Kostantinos Plegas (from (Greece) Panachaiki F.C.)

Out: Note: Flags indicate national team as defined under FIFA eligibility rules; some limited exceptions apply. Players may hold more than one non-FIFA nationality.

No.	Pos.	Nation	Player
—	MF	POR	Paulo Machado (to (Croatia) GNK Dinamo Zagreb) (fee:€2,500,000)
—	MF	ARG	Tomás De Vincenti (to (Cyprus) APOEL)(fee:€500,000)
—	DF	GRE	Anastasios Papazoglou (to (Cyprus) APOEL)(free transfer)
—	MF	GRE	Andreas Tatos (to (Greece) Atromitos) (free transfer)
—	FW	GRE	Thanasis Papazoglou (to (Greece) Atromitos) (free transfer)
—	GK	NIR	Roy Carroll (to (England) Notts County F.C.) (free transfer)
—	DF	ESP	Miguel Torres Gómez (to (Spain) Málaga CF) (free transfer)
—	MF	GRE	Manolis Siopis (to (Greece) Panionios) (free transfer)
—	MF	ARG	Ariel Ibagaza (to (Greece) Panionios) (free transfer)
—	MF	COL	Juan Pablo Pino (to (France) SC Bastia) (free transfer)
—	MF	GRE	Andreas Samaris (to (Portugal) Benfica)(fee:€10,000,000)
—	DF	GRE	Kostas Manolas (to (Italy) Roma)(fee:€13M +2M bonus)
—	DF	GRE	José Holebas (to (Italy) Roma)(fee:€1M +0,5M bonus)
—	DF	FRA	Claude Dielna (to (England) Sheffield Wednesday F.C.) (free transfer)
—	DF	GRE	Avraam Papadopoulos (to (Turkey) Trabzonspor) (free transfer)
—	FW	ARG	Javier Saviola (to (Italy) Hellas Verona F.C.) (free transfer)
—	FW	PAR	Hernán Pérez (loan return to (Spain) Villarreal)
—	FW	PAR	Nelson Haedo Valdez (loan return to (Germany) Eintracht Frankfurt)
—	FW	CRC	Joel Campbell (loan return to (England) Arsenal)
—	DF	ESP	Iván Marcano (loan return to (Portugal) Porto)
—	GK	GRE	Andreas Gianniotis (on loan to (Greece) PAS Giannina)
—	DF	GRE	Vasilios Karagounis (on loan to (Italy) Reggina)
—	DF	GRE	Konstantinos Rougalas (on loan to (Spain) Atlético Madrid B)
—	DF	GRE	Manolis Tzanakakis (on loan to (Greece) Ergotelis)
—	DF	GRE	Charalambos Lykogiannis (on loan to (Greece) Ergotelis)
—	DF	GRE	Konstantinos Vlachos (on loan to (Greece) Fostiras)
—	DF	BRA	Leandro (on loan to (Greece) Lamia)
—	MF	MLI	Sambou Yatabaré (on loan to (France) Guingamp)
—	MF	SRB	Aleksandar Katai (on loan to (Serbia) Crvena Zvezda)
—	MF	SRB	Saša Zdjelar (on loan to (Serbia) OFK Beograd)
—	MF	MNE	Marko Janković (on loan to (Serbia) OFK Beograd)
—	MF	GRE	Dimitris Kolovos (on loan to (Greece) Panionios)
—	MF	GRE	Panagiotis Vlachodimos (on loan to (Greece) Ergotelis)
—	MF	GRE	Nikos Katharios (on loan to (Greece) Panthrakikos)
—	MF	GRE	Konstantinos Plegas (on loan to (Greece) Panachaiki)
—	MF	GRE	Dimitris Siopis (on loan to (Greece) Fostiras)
—	MF	GRE	Nikos-Angelos Psychogios (on loan to (Greece) Fostiras)
—	FW	GRE	Nikolaos Ioannidis (on loan to (Netherlands) Zwolle)
—	FW	GRE	Anastasios Karamanos (on loan to (Greece) Atromitos)
—	FW	BEL	David Henen (on loan to (England) Everton B)
—	FW	SRB	Marko Scepovic (on loan to (Spain) Mallorca)

== Panathinaikos ==
In: Note: Flags indicate national team as defined under FIFA eligibility rules; some limited exceptions apply. Players may hold more than one non-FIFA nationality.

No.	Pos.	Nation	Player
—	FW	GRE	Konstantinos Apostolopoulos (loan return from Panachaiki)
—	GK	ENG	Luke Steele (from (England) Barnsley)
—	DF	CRO	Gordon Schildenfeld (on loan from (Russia) Dynamo Moscow)
—	DF	GRE	Christos Bourbos (from OFI)
—	MF	NED	Ouasim Bouy (on loan from (Italy) Juventus)
—	FW	SWE	Valmir Berisha (on loan from (Italy) Roma)

Out: Note: Flags indicate national team as defined under FIFA eligibility rules; some limited exceptions apply. Players may hold more than one non-FIFA nationality.

No.	Pos.	Nation	Player
—	MF	ALG	Mehdi Abeid (loan return to (England) Newcastle United)
—	FW	URU	Adrián Balboa (loan return to (Uruguay) Club Sportivo Cerrito)
—	DF	CRO	Gordon Schildenfeld (loan return to (Russia) Dynamo Moscow)
—	DF	GRE	Alexandros Mouzakitis (loan to Niki Volos)
—	FW	GRE	Nikos Giannitsanis (loan to Niki Volos)
—	GK	GRE	Stefanos Kapino (to FSV Mainz 05 (fee 2.200.000 €)
—	GK	GRE	Alexandros Tabakis (loan to Niki Volos)
—	MF	GRE	Evangelos Anastasopoulos (loan to Niki Volos)
—	DF	GRE	Nikos Marinakis (loan to Niki Volos)
—	GK	GRE	Nestoras Gekas (loan to Fostiras)
—	FW	GRE	Konstantinos Apostolopoulos (to (Belgium) Union)

== Panetolikos ==
In: Note: Flags indicate national team as defined under FIFA eligibility rules; some limited exceptions apply. Players may hold more than one non-FIFA nationality.

No.	Pos.	Nation	Player
—	GK	BRA	Rafael Bracalli (from (Portugal) Porto)
—	DF	FRA	Cyril Kali (from (Greece) Veria)
—	DF	BRA	Rodrigo Galo (on loan from (Portugal) Braga)
—	DF	PER	Carlos Ascues (from (Portugal) Benfica B)
—	DF	CMR	André Bikey (from (England) Middlesbrough)
—	MF	GRE	Alexandros Kalogeris (from (Greece) Veria)
—	MF	ARG	Fernando Godoy (from (Argentina) Independiente)
—	MF	GRE	Giorgos Theodoridis (from (Cyprus) Apollon Limassol)
—	FW	GRE	Ilias Ioannou (from (Greece) Veria)
—	FW	ARG	Mauro Poy (from (Greece) Levadiakos)

Out: Note: Flags indicate national team as defined under FIFA eligibility rules; some limited exceptions apply. Players may hold more than one non-FIFA nationality.

No.	Pos.	Nation	Player
—	DF	GRE	Nikos Arabatzis (released)
—	MF	GRE	Alexandros Zeris (released)
—	MF	GRE	Giorgos Iordanidis (released)
—	FW	GRE	Evgenios Kitsas (released)
—	DF	GRE	Giorgos Tzintzis (released)
—	GK	GRE	Dimitrios Tsapalos (released)
—	DF	GRE	Giannis Ioannou (to (Greece) Panegialios F.C.)
—	MF	GRE	Pavlos Mitropoulos (on loan to (Greece) Panionios)
—	GK	GRE	Antonis Kelaidis (on loan to (Greece) Episkopi F.C.)
—	MF	ARG	Lucas Favalli (to (Argentina) Instituto Atlético Central Córdoba)
—	MF	SRB	Vladimir Bogdanović (to (Azerbaijan) AZAL PFK)
—	MF	BUL	Hristo Yanev (to (Bulgaria) PFC Slavia Sofia)
—	FW	SVN	Mirnes Sisic (released)
—	FW	COD	Patrick Dimbala (to (Greece) AEL Kalloni)

== Panionios ==
In: Note: Flags indicate national team as defined under FIFA eligibility rules; some limited exceptions apply. Players may hold more than one non-FIFA nationality.

No.	Pos.	Nation	Player
—	DF	ALB	Kosmas Gezos (Return From Ioan Glyfada)
—	DF	GRE	Pantelis Pozidis (Return From Ioan Vyzas Megaron)
—	FW	GRE	Kostas Stavrothanasopoulos (Return From Ioan Thrasyvoulos Fylis)
—	FW	GRE	Panagiotis Kalogiannis (Return From Ioan Thrasyvoulos Fylis)

Out: Note: Flags indicate national team as defined under FIFA eligibility rules; some limited exceptions apply. Players may hold more than one non-FIFA nationality.

No.	Pos.	Nation	Player

== Panthrakikos ==
In: Note: Flags indicate national team as defined under FIFA eligibility rules; some limited exceptions apply. Players may hold more than one non-FIFA nationality.

No.	Pos.	Nation	Player
—	MF	GRE	Christos Tzanis (from PAS Giannina)

Out: Note: Flags indicate national team as defined under FIFA eligibility rules; some limited exceptions apply. Players may hold more than one non-FIFA nationality.

No.	Pos.	Nation	Player
—	FW	GRE	Dimitrios Papadopoulos (to Atromitos)
—	DF	GRE	Giannis Stathis (to OFI)
—	FW	ARG	Juan Munafo (to Asteras Tripolis)

== PAOK ==
In: Note: Flags indicate national team as defined under FIFA eligibility rules; some limited exceptions apply. Players may hold more than one non-FIFA nationality.

No.	Pos.	Nation	Player
—	DF	GRE	Ioannis Skondras (from Atromitos)
—	MF	GRE	Alexandros Tziolis (from (France) AS Monaco)
—	MF	GRE	Nikos Spyropoulos (from (Italy) Chievo)
—	FW	LBR	Sekou Oliseh (on loan from (Russia) CSKA Moscow)
—	DF	ESP	Íñigo López (from (Spain) Granada)
—	DF	POR	Miguel Vítor (from (Portugal) Benfica)
—	FW	CZE	Tomáš Necid (on loan from (Russia) CSKA Moscow)
—	FW	ESP	Lucas Pérez (from (Ukraine) Karpaty Lviv)
—	FW	SVK	Miroslav Stoch (on loan from (Turkey) Fenerbahçe)
—	DF	GRE	Georgios Tzavellas (from (France) AS Monaco)
—	MF	GRE	Sotiris Ninis (on loan from (Italy) Parma F.C.)

Out: Note: Flags indicate national team as defined under FIFA eligibility rules; some limited exceptions apply. Players may hold more than one non-FIFA nationality.

No.	Pos.	Nation	Player
—	GK	CMR	Charles Itandje (on loan to (Turkey) Torku Konyaspor)
—	DF	GRE	Christos Intzidis (on loan to Platanias)
—	DF	BRA	Etto (released)
—	DF	GRE	Alexis Apostolopoulos (on loan to Veria)
—	DF	CRO	Gordon Schildenfeld (loan return to (Russia) Dynamo Moscow)
—	DF	GRE	Kostas Stafylidis (loan return to (Germany) Bayer Leverkusen)
—	DF	RSA	Bongani Khumalo (loan return to (England) Tottenham Hotspur)
—	MF	GRE	Georgios Fotakis (released)
—	MF	FRA	Bertrand Robert (released)
—	MF	GRE	Kostas Panagiotoudis (on loan to Panionios)
—	MF	GRE	Dimitris Popovic (on loan to Panionios)
—	FW	GUI	Abdoul Camara (loan return to (France) Sochaux)

== PAS Giannina ==
In: Note: Flags indicate national team as defined under FIFA eligibility rules; some limited exceptions apply. Players may hold more than one non-FIFA nationality.

No.	Pos.	Nation	Player
—	MF	NED	Charlton Vicento (from (Netherlands) ADO Den Haag)
—	GK	GRE	Markos Vellidis (from Aris)
—	GK	GRE	Dimitrios Sotiriou (from (Cyprus) Ermis Aradippou)
—	MF	ARG	Cristian Chávez (from (Italy) Napoli)
—	GK	GRE	Georgios Abaris (from (Romania) U Cluj)
—	MF	GRE	Apostolos Skondras (from AEL)

Out: Note: Flags indicate national team as defined under FIFA eligibility rules; some limited exceptions apply. Players may hold more than one non-FIFA nationality.

No.	Pos.	Nation	Player
—	DF	GRE	Marios Ikonomou (to (Italy) Cagliari)
—	MF	ARG	Tomas De Vincenti (to Olympiacos)
—	GK	MAR	Karim Fegrouche (to (Cyprus) AEL Limassol)
—	DF	GRE	Anastasios Pantos (retired)
—	DF	GRE	Christos Patsatzoglou (released)
—	MF	GRE	Christos Tzanis (to Panthrakikos)
—	MF	GRE	Fotis Georgiou (to Atromitos)
—	MF	GRE	Giannis Zaradoukas (loan return to Olympiacos)

== Platanias ==
In: Note: Flags indicate national team as defined under FIFA eligibility rules; some limited exceptions apply. Players may hold more than one non-FIFA nationality.

No.	Pos.	Nation	Player

== Xanthi ==
In: Note: Flags indicate national team as defined under FIFA eligibility rules; some limited exceptions apply. Players may hold more than one non-FIFA nationality.

No.	Pos.	Nation	Player

== Veria ==
In: Note: Flags indicate national team as defined under FIFA eligibility rules; some limited exceptions apply. Players may hold more than one non-FIFA nationality.

No.	Pos.	Nation	Player
—	MF	ARG	Roberto Battión (from Independiente)
—	FW	ARG	Javier Cámpora (from All Boys)
—	FW	AUS	Theo Markelis (from Hercules B)
—	MF	CMR	Cédric Mandjeck (from Valencia B)
—	GK	GRE	Georgios Vasileiadis (from Veria U20)
—	GK	GRE	Dimitris Chomsioglou (from Anagennisi Giannitsa)
—	DF	GRE	Sotiris Balafas (from Hoverla)
—	MF	GRE	Vangelis Tsiamis (from Anagennisi Karditsa)
—	MF	GRE	Marios Papadopoulos (from Agotikos Asteras)
—	MF	GRE	Giorgos Georgiadis (from PAOK)
—	MF	GRE	Kostas Panagiotoudis (on loan from PAOK)
—	MF	GRE	Giorgos Katidis (from Novara)
—	DF	FRA	Cyril Kali (from Panetolikos)
—	FW	ITA	Nicolao Dumitru (on loan from Napoli)
—	MF	MEX	Pedro Arce (from Kavala)
—	FW	NED	Nigel Hasselbaink (from St Johnstone)
—	FW	SRB	Zvonimir Vukić (from PAOK)
—	GK	ESP	Xavi Ginard (from Atlético Baleares)
—	DF	ESP	Raúl Bravo (from Córdoba)
—	DF	ESP	Iván Malón (from Mirandés)
—	DF	ESP	José Catalá (from Apollon Limassol)
—	MF	ESP	David Vázquez (from Melilla)
—	MF	ESP	Jokin Esparza (from Huesca)

Out: Note: Flags indicate national team as defined under FIFA eligibility rules; some limited exceptions apply. Players may hold more than one non-FIFA nationality.

No.	Pos.	Nation	Player
—	GK	GRE	Nikolaos Anastasopoulos (released)
—	DF	GRE	Nikolaos Georgiadis (released)
—	DF	GRE	Nikos Tzimogiannis (released)
—	DF	GRE	Konstantinos Barbas (released)
—	DF	GRE	Alexandros Apostolopoulos (loan return to PAOK)
—	MF	GRE	Stefanos Siontis (released)
—	MF	GRE	Marios Papadopoulos (on loan to Aris)
—	FW	GRE	Panagiotis Plavoukos (to Ethnikos Gazoros)
—	MF	RUS	Pavel Komolov (loan return to Zalgiris Vilnius)
—	DF	CZE	Petr Trapp (loan return to Viktoria)
—	DF	FRA	Mohamadou Sissoko (released)
—	FW	POR	Esmaël Gonçalves (released)
—	MF	ESP	Guille (released)
—	MF	POR	Zézinho (loan return to Sporting)

== See also ==
- (India) I-League transfers for the 2014–15 season
- (Bulgaria) List of Bulgarian football transfers summer 2014
- (Cyprus) List of Cypriot football transfers summer 2014
- (Netherlands) List of Dutch football transfers summer 2014
- (England) List of English football transfers summer 2014
- (Malta) List of Maltese football transfers summer 2014
- (Germany) List of German football transfers summer 2014
- (Portugal) List of Portuguese football transfers summer 2014
- (Spain) List of Spanish football transfers summer 2014
- (Latvia) List of Latvian football transfers summer 2014
- (Serbia) List of Serbian football transfers summer 2014
