= Stefanos Papoutsogiannopoulos =

Greek footballer

Personal information
- Date of birth: 10 August 1994 (age 32)
- Place of birth: Rhodes, Greece
- Height: 1.81 m (5 ft 11 1/2 in)
- Position: Midfielder

Youth career
- –2011: Rodos
- 2011–2012: Diagoras
- 2012–2013: Panetolikos

Senior career*
Years	Team	Apps	(Gls)
2013–2017	Panetolikos	28	(0)
2017–2018	Panserraikos	20	(3)
2018–2020	Platanias	31	(3)
2021–2022	Ialysos	16	(1)
- * Club domestic league appearances and goals as of 21:00, 19 June 2021 (UTC)

Stefanos Papoutsogiannopoulos (Greek: Στέφανος Παπουτσογιαννόπουλος; born 10 August 1994) is a Greek professional footballer who plays as a midfielder.

== Career ==
Papoutsogiannopoulos began his career with the youth club of Panetolikos in 2012, after having previously played for Rodos and Diagoras. He signed his first professional contract with Panetolikos in June 2013. He made his first-team debut on 18 August 2013, playing against Panathinaikos in the 2013–14 Super League Greece.
