= El Fardou Ben Nabouhane =

Footballer (born 1989)

El Fardou Ben Nabouhane الفردو بن نبوهان
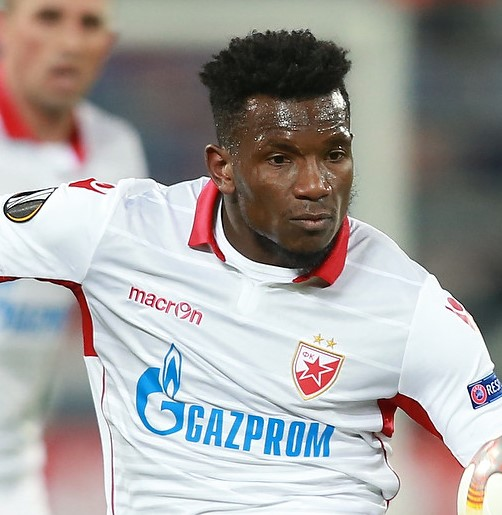
- Ben Nabouhane with Red Star Belgrade in 2018

Personal information
- Full name: El Fardou Mohamed Ben Nabouhane
- Date of birth: 10 June 1989 (age 37)
- Place of birth: Passamainty, Mayotte, France
- Height: 1.74 m (5 ft 9 in)
- Position: Forward

Youth career
- 2000–2006: JS Saint-Pierroise
- 2006–2008: Le Havre

Senior career*
Years	Team	Apps	(Gls)
2008–2010	Le Havre	8	(0)
2008–2010	→ Le Havre B (loan)	64	(17)
2010–2013	Vannes	92	(22)
2013–2015	Veria	61	(25)
2015–2018	Olympiacos	2	(0)
2016	→ Levadiakos (loan)	12	(2)
2016–2017	→ Panionios (loan)	34	(9)
2018–2023	Red Star Belgrade	132	(65)
2023–2024	APOEL	12	(2)
2024–2025	Železničar Pančevo	5	(0)
2025–2026	Zemun	10	(1)
Total		432	(143)

International career
2014–2025	Comoros	47	(20)
- * Club domestic league appearances and goals

El Fardou Mohamed Ben Nabouhane (Arabic: الفردو محمد بن نبوهان; born 10 June 1989), known as El Fardou Ben, Ben Nabouhane or simply Ben, is a retired professional footballer who played as a forward. Born in Mayotte, France, he played for the Comoros national team. He is his country's all-time top goalscorer.

== Club career ==
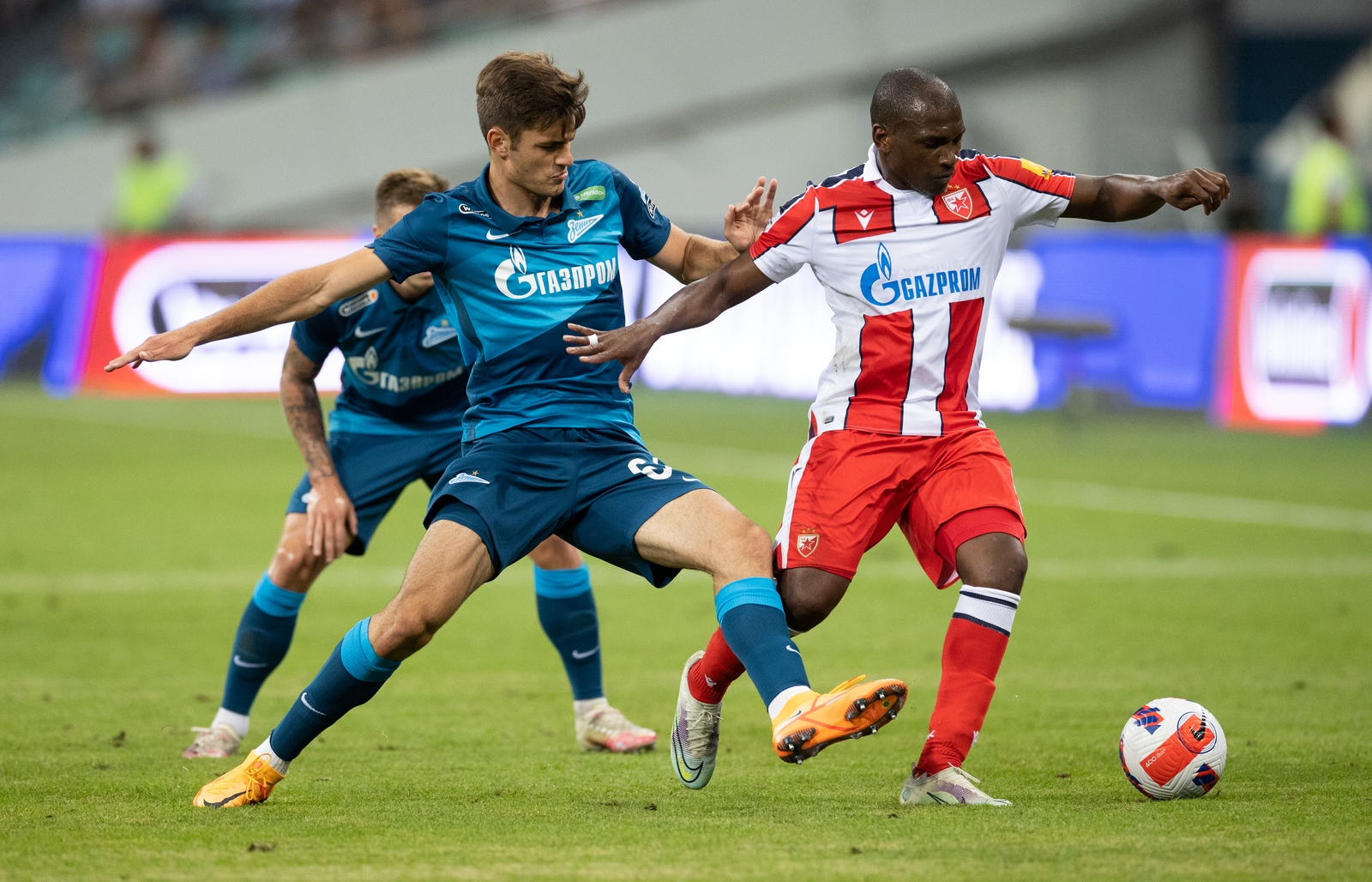
Ben Nabouhane in action for Red Star Belgrade in 2022

=== Early career ===
Born in Passamainty in the French overseas collectivity of Mayotte, Ben moved to the island of Réunion to play for the Réunion Premier League club JS Saint-Pierroise. In 2006, he joined Le Havre.

After spending one year in the reserves, El Fardou was promoted to the senior squad. He made his professional debut and start for Le Havre on 3 March 2008 in a Ligue 2 match against Troyes, playing 72 minutes before being substituted. He made one more appearance that season and though he did not contribute that much, he still received a winner's medal as Le Havre were crowned Ligue 2 champions and were promoted to Ligue 1 for the 2008–09 season.

Ben did not see much time in Ligue 1 play early on, instead playing in the reserves. He received his first call up to the squad for their Coupe de la Ligue match against Rennes, held on 12 November 2008. In the match, which he started, he scored his first professional goal in the 15th minute, contributing to Le Havre's 2–1 win over Rennes. He made his Ligue 1 debut just three days later in a match against Paris Saint-Germain.

=== Veria ===
After three years playing for Ligue 2 side Vannes OC, he signed a two-year contract with Super League Greece side Veria. He made his debut with the club in an away draw against Platanias in August 2013. He was named Super League's second top scorer during the 2013–14 Super League Greece season as he scored 15 goals with Veria. During his second season at Veria he scored his first season goal in a home victory against Xanthi, also grabbing an assist during that match as well as during the second matchday against OFI. He got injured for two weeks and he returned to the pitch as a substitute against PAS Giannina. Ben scored against Xanthi in a 2–2 away draw, while he also assisted the second goal with which Nikos Kaltsas equalized the score. On 17 January 2015, Ben scored twice against OFI in a 4–1 home victory and he was eventually named as the MVP of the 19th matchday. He was also offered a three-year contract extension after the OFI away victory, with triple wages, but it was rejected as the player demanded higher wages. His contract was set to expire on 30 June 2014. On 20 April 2015 Ben also scored twice against Asteras Tripolis in a 4–0 home victory, also assisting one. In the second season, 2014–15 Super League Greece with the club, he went on to score ten goals and assist eight.

=== Olympiacos ===
In July 2015, Ben signed a contract with Greek giants Olympiacos on a free transfer from Veria. According to newspapers rumours Levadiakos was not the only Greek club interested in signing Ben, with Platanias also considering signing him in the January transfer window. The Comoros international suffered a serious cruciate ligament injury in May and was surplus to requirements for Olympiacos manager Marco Silva. On 29 December 2015, since he did not manage to earn a single appearance with the club, he signed a six-month contract with Levadiakos until the end of 2015–16 season. On 10 January 2016, in his first appearance with his new club, he scored in a 3–1 away loss against Olympiacos.

On 8 July 2016, he signed a two-year contract with Panionios for the 2016–17 season, on loan from Olympiacos. On 3 December 2016, in his 9th appearance with the club he scored the only goal for his team in a 1–1 away draw against Platanias. He finished the 2016–17 season as the top scorer and MVP of the club.

On 26 July 2017, after his loan at Panionios expired, Ben scored a brace for Olympiacos in a 3–1 victory against Partizan in the first leg of the UEFA Champions League third qualifying round. With only ten appearances with the club in all competitions in the first half of the 2017–18 season, Ben attracted the interest of Serbian club Red Star Belgrade, which offered him a three-year contract. On 19 December 2017, the Comorian international striker was dropped from the Olympiacos first-team squad after deciding not to extend his contract.

=== Red Star Belgrade ===
On 12 January 2018, Ben signed a 2 1/2-year contract with Red Star Belgrade. The transfer fee was estimated to be €500,000. His contract, which runs until 2020, is worth €1 million plus bonuses.

On 29 August 2018, Ben scored twice, each time from an assist by Miloš Degenek, in the 2–2 draw with Red Bull Salzburg; as a result Red Star Belgrade qualified to the group stage of the 2018–19 UEFA Champions League. On 28 November 2018, he scored his first UEFA Champions League goal in a 3–1 defeat against Napoli in the 2018–19 season. On 29 October 2020, he scored a brace in a 5–1 win over Slovan Liberec in the 2020–21 UEFA Europa League.

=== APOEL ===
On 16 January 2023, Ben officially joined Cypriot side APOEL on a permanent deal, signing a contract until May 2025 with the club.

== International career ==
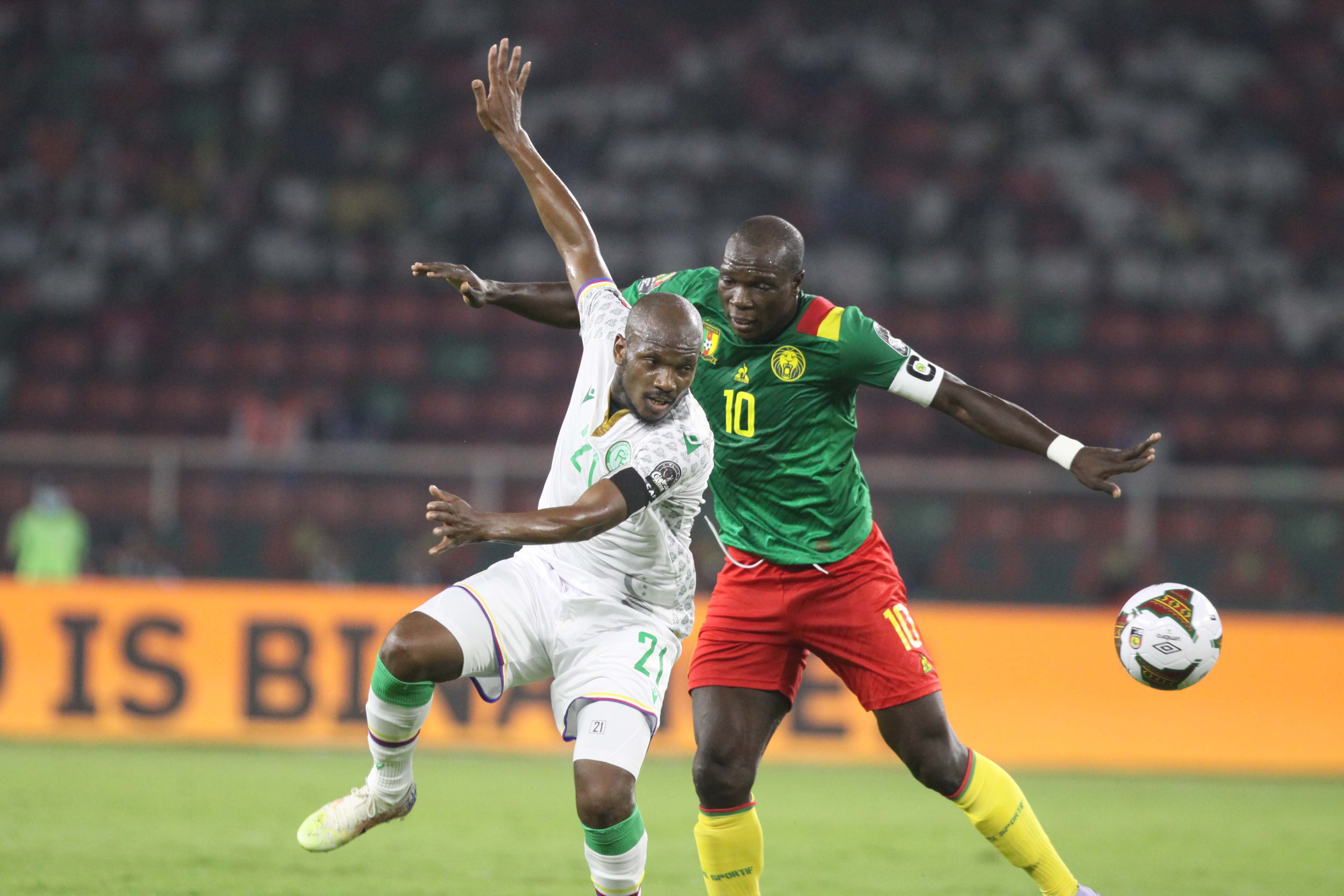
Ben Nabouhane in action for Comoros in 2022 against Cameroon

On 5 March 2014, he made his international début with Comoros, in a friendly against Burkina Faso. Subsequently sidelined with a serious injury with his club, he returned to action to help his national team reach the qualifying competition of a major international tournament for the first time in their history, a goal they have been pursuing since 2007. On 24 March 2016, it was Ben who scored the only goal of the Africa Cup of Nations preliminary qualifying round match against Botswana, his country's first-ever win in a competitive international.

In January 2022, Ben was selected to the Comoros squad at the 2021 Africa Cup of Nations, the country's first ever appearance in a major tournament. On 18 January 2022, he scored the first goal in the final group stage match at the tournament, in a 3–2 win against Ghana. The result eliminated Ghana and earned his nation a berth in the knockout stages.

On 11 December 2025, Ben was called up to the Comoros squad for the 2025 Africa Cup of Nations.

== Career statistics ==
=== Club ===
As of end of 2023–24 season

Appearances and goals by club, season and competition
Club	Season	League			Cup		Continental		Other		Total	
Club	Season	Division	Apps	Goals	Apps	Goals	Apps	Goals	Apps	Goals	Apps	Goals
Le Havre	2007–08	Ligue 2	2	0	0	0	0	0	0	0	2	0
Le Havre	2008–09	Ligue 1	5	0	1	0	0	0	1 (Note: Appearances in Coupe de la Ligue)	1	7	1
Le Havre	2009–10	Ligue 2	1	0	0	0	0	0	0	0	1	0
Le Havre	Total		8	0	1	0	0	0	1	1	10	1
Vannes	2010–11	Ligue 2	24	3	0	0	0	0	2	0	26	3
Vannes	2011–12	Championnat National	35	11	1	1	0	0	2	0	38	12
Vannes	2012–13	Championnat National	33	8	0	0	0	0	0	0	33	8
Vannes	Total		92	22	1	1	0	0	4	0	97	23
Veria	2013–14	Super League Greece	33	15	1	0	0	0	—		34	15
Veria	2014–15	Super League Greece	28	10	2	0	0	0	—		30	10
Veria	Total		61	25	3	0	0	0	—		64	25
Levadiakos (loan)	2015–16	Super League Greece	12	2	2	0	0	0	—		14	2
Panionios (loan)	2016–17	Super League Greece	34	9	2	0	0	0	—		36	9
Olympiacos	2017–18	Super League Greece	2	0	2	0	6	2	—		10	2
Red Star Belgrade	2017–18	Serbian SuperLiga	14	8	0	0	2	0	—		16	8
Red Star Belgrade	2018–19	Serbian SuperLiga	24	17	4	1	14	7	—		42	25
Red Star Belgrade	2019–20	Serbian SuperLiga	21	13	2	1	6	0	—		29	14
Red Star Belgrade	2020–21	Serbian SuperLiga	29	12	2	0	11	6	—		42	18
Red Star Belgrade	2021–22	Serbian SuperLiga	33	13	5	3	14	2	—		52	18
Red Star Belgrade	2022–23	Serbian SuperLiga	11	2	0	0	4	0	—		15	2
Red Star Belgrade	Total		132	65	13	5	51	15	—		196	85
APOEL	2022–23	Cypriot First Division	12	2	1	0	0	0	—		13	2
Career total			353	125	25	6	57	17	5	1	440	149

=== International ===
Appearances and goals by national team and year
National team	Year	Apps	Goals
Comoros	2014	3	0
Comoros	2016	6	3
Comoros	2017	3	1
Comoros	2018	4	4
Comoros	2019	5	1
Comoros	2020	3	1
Comoros	2021	4	5
Comoros	2022	9	2
Comoros	2024	5	2
Comoros	2025	5	1
Total		47	20

Scores and results list Comoros' goal tally first, score column indicates score after each Ben Nabouhane goal.

List of international goals scored by El Fardou Ben Nabouhane
No.	Date	Venue	Opponent	Score	Result	Competition	Ref.
1	24 March 2016	Stade Said Mohamed Cheikh, Mitsamiouli, Comoros	Botswana	1–0	1–0	2017 Africa Cup of Nations qualification	
2	11 November 2016	El Menzah Stadium, Tunis, Tunisia	Togo	1–1	2–2	Friendly	
3	11 November 2016	El Menzah Stadium, Tunis, Tunisia	Togo	2–1	2–2	Friendly	
4	28 March 2017	Anjalay Stadium, Belle Vue Harel, Mauritius	Mauritius	1–0	1–1	2019 Africa Cup of Nations qualification	
5	8 September 2018	Stade Said Mohamed Cheikh, Mitsamiouli, Comoros	Cameroon	1–0	1–1	2019 Africa Cup of Nations qualification	
6	16 October 2018	Stade Said Mohamed Cheikh, Mitsamiouli, Comoros	Morocco	1–0	2–2	2019 Africa Cup of Nations qualification	
7	16 October 2018	Stade Said Mohamed Cheikh, Mitsamiouli, Comoros	Morocco	2–2	2–2	2019 Africa Cup of Nations qualification	
8	17 November 2018	Stade de Beaumer, Moroni, Comoros	Malawi	1–0	2–1	2019 Africa Cup of Nations qualification	
9	12 October 2019	Stade Montbauron, Versailles, France	Guinea	1–0	1–0	Friendly	
10	15 November 2020	Stade omnisports de Malouzini, Moroni, Comoros	Kenya	1–0	2–1	2021 Africa Cup of Nations qualification	
11	1 September 2021	Stade omnisports de Malouzini, Moroni, Comoros	Seychelles	5–0	7–1	Friendly	
12	1 September 2021	Stade omnisports de Malouzini, Moroni, Comoros	Seychelles	6–0	7–1	Friendly	
13	1 September 2021	Stade omnisports de Malouzini, Moroni, Comoros	Seychelles	7–1	7–1	Friendly	
14	13 November 2021	Sakarya Atatürk Stadium, Adapazarı, Turkey	Sierra Leone	1–0	2–0	Friendly	
15	13 November 2021	Sakarya Atatürk Stadium, Adapazarı, Turkey	Sierra Leone	2–0	2–0	Friendly	
16	18 January 2022	Roumdé Adjia Stadium, Garoua, Cameroon	Ghana	1–0	3–2	2021 Africa Cup of Nations	
17	7 June 2022	National Heroes Stadium, Lusaka, Zambia	Zambia	1–0	1–2	2023 Africa Cup of Nations qualification	
18	7 June 2024	FNB Stadium, Johannesburg, South Africa	Madagascar	1–2	1–2	2026 FIFA World Cup qualification	
19	11 June 2024	Honor Stadium, Oujda, Morocco	Chad	2–0	2–0	2026 FIFA World Cup qualification	
20	17 November 2025	Stade omnisports de Malouzini, Moroni, Comoros	Namibia	4–0	4–0	Friendly	

== Honours ==
Red Star Belgrade

- Serbian SuperLiga: 2017–18, 2018–19, 2019–20, 2020–21, 2021–22
- Serbian Cup: 2020–21, 2021–22

Individual

- 2014–15 MVP awards: Matchday 19, Matchday 31
- NOVA Super League Awards 2014: Best team (Forward)
- Serbian SuperLiga Team of the Season: 2018–19
- Serbian SuperLiga Player of the Week: 2020–21 (Round 26), 2021–22 (Round 18)
