= Orestes (footballer) =

Brazilian footballer (born 1981)

Personal information
- Full name: Orestes Júnior Alves
- Date of birth: 24 March 1981 (age 45)
- Place of birth: Lavras, Brazil
- Height: 1.82 m (6 ft 0 in)
- Position: Centre back

Youth career
- Santos
- Portuguesa Santista

Senior career*
Years	Team	Apps	(Gls)
2001–2002	Santos	6	(0)
2002–2003	Belenenses	26	(0)
2003–2004	Vitória Setúbal	27	(1)
2004–2005	Maia	33	(3)
2005–2006	Santa Clara	33	(3)
2006–2007	Naval	29	(1)
2007–2010	Hansa Rostock	73	(7)
2010–2011	Naval	14	(0)
2011–2012	Damash Gilan	26	(0)
2012–2014	Veria	38	(1)
2014	Al-Arabi	9	(1)
2014–2015	Al-Shahania	2	(0)
2015	Al-Shoalah	8	(1)
Total		324	(18)
- * Club domestic league appearances and goals

Orestes Júnior Alves (born 24 March 1981), known simply as Orestes, is a Brazilian former professional footballer who played as a centre-back.
