= Everton Bezerra =

Brazilian footballer (born 1984)

Personal information
- Full name: Everton Santos Bezerra
- Date of birth: 15 June 1984 (age 42)
- Place of birth: Rio de Janeiro, Brazil
- Height: 1.82 m (6 ft 0 in)
- Position: Defender

Senior career*
Years	Team	Apps	(Gls)
2006–2008	Madureira		
2008	Brasiliense		(1)
2009	Macaé	2	(0)
2010	Grêmio Barueri	0	(0)
2011	Cabofriense	12	(3)
2011	Anápolis		
2011–2012	Juventude	12	(0)
2012–2013	Veria	3	(0)
2013–2014	Resende	18	(1)
2014–2016	Ethnikos Achna	24	(0)
2017	Resende		
- * Club domestic league appearances and goals

Everton Santos Bezerra (born 15 June 1984) is a former Brazilian professional footballer.

On 24 July 2014, he signed for Cypriot club Ethnikos Achna.
