= Branko Ostojić =

Bosnian Serb footballer

Personal information
- Full name: Branko Ostojić
- Date of birth: 3 January 1984 (age 42)
- Place of birth: Goražde, SFR Yugoslavia
- Height: 1.83 m (6 ft 0 in)
- Position: Defensive midfielder

Senior career*
| Years | Team | Apps | (Gls) |
| 2002–2007 | Sloboda Čačak | 14+ | (1+) |
| 2007–2008 | Radnički Kragujevac | 22 | (0) |
| 2008–2010 | FAP | 32 | (3) |
| 2010–2011 | Partizan Bumbarevo Brdo | 30 | (3) |
| 2010–2013 | Javor Ivanjica | 63 | (0) |
| 2013–2016 | Veria | 58 | (1) |
| 2016–2017 | OFI | 15 | (1) |
| 2017–2018 | Doxa Drama | 16 | (0) |
| 2018 | Voždovac | 1 | (0) |
| 2019 | Radnički Kragujevac | 9 | (0) |
| 2019–2020 | Borac Čačak | | |
| 2020–2022 | Sloboda Čačak | | |
- * Club domestic league appearances and goals

Branko Ostojić (Serbian Cyrillic: Бранко Остојић; born 3 January 1984) is a Bosnian Serb footballer who plays as defensive midfielder.

== Club career ==
Born in Goražde, SR Bosnia and Herzegovina (still within Yugoslavia), Ostojić started his career in Serbia where he spent his first five years playing for Sloboda Čačak at the start of his senior career. After his departure from Sloboda he spent time playing for several other third-level clubs. He joined Javor Ivanjica in 2011 and played in the Serbian SuperLiga.

On 14 June 2013 the Greek superleague side Veria signed Ostojić on a free transfer. He scored his first goal for the club in season 2013–14 with an amazing shot against Skoda Xanthi, during the 31st matchday of the season. Despite being in Veria only for a season, Ostojić was named as the third club captain during the 2014–15 season.

Ostojić renewed his contract with Veria for one more year on 21 May 2015.

Ostojić left FK Voždovac at the end of 2018.

In summer 2019, he moved from Radnički Kragujevac to Borac Čačak.
