= Giannis Ioannou (footballer, born 1984) =

Greek footballer

Personal information
- Full name: Ioannis Ioannou
- Date of birth: 9 April 1984 (age 42)
- Place of birth: Antikyra, Greece
- Height: 1.88 m (6 ft 2 in)
- Position: Defender

Senior career*
Years	Team	Apps	(Gls)
2001–2003	Panachaiki	14	(0)
2004–2006	Olympiacos Volos	39	(0)
2006	Achaiki	11	(0)
2006–2008	Fokikos	0	(0)
2008–2009	Chaidari	32	(0)
2009–2011	Vyzas	45	(1)
2011–2012	Panachaiki	34	(0)
2012–2013	Panetolikos	34	(0)
2013–2016	Panegialios	68	(4)
2016–2019	Kerkyra	72	(1)
2019–2020	Ionikos	22	(0)
- * Club domestic league appearances and goals as of 20:56, 25 June 2020 (UTC)

Giannis Ioannou (Greek: Γιάννης Ιωάννου; born 9 April 1984) is a Greek professional footballer who plays as a defender.

== Career ==
Ioannou has spent most of his career playing for Panachaiki.

He signed with Panetolikos in the summer of 2012 and helped the team gain promotion to the 2013–2014 Greek Super League. As his contract was not renewed, he signed with Panegialios in the summer of 2013.
