= Nikos Tzimogiannis =

Greek footballer

Personal information
- Full name: Nikolaos Tzimogiannis
- Date of birth: 17 November 1987 (age 38)
- Place of birth: Veria, Greece
- Height: 1.86 m (6 ft 1 in)
- Position: Defender

Youth career
- –2008: PAONE
- 2008–2010: Veria U-20

Senior career*
| Years | Team | Apps | (Gls) |
| 2010–2014 | Veria | 26 | (0) |
| 2014– | Panegialios | 0 | (0) |
- * Club domestic league appearances and goals as of 10 August 2014 ‡ National team caps and goals as of 20 September 2013

Nikos Tzimogiannis (Greek: Νίκος Τζημογιάννης; born 17 November 1987) is a Greek footballer who currently plays in Greek second division for Panegialios F.C.

== Honours ==
=== Veria F.C. ===
- Football League: Runner-up: 2011-12
- Football League 2: 2009-10
