= Julio Segundo =

Panamanian footballer (born 1993)

Personal information
- Full name: Julio Manuel Segundo Ríos
- Date of birth: 26 September 1993 (age 33)
- Place of birth: La Chorrera, Panama
- Height: 1.73 m (5 ft 8 in)
- Position: Midfielder

Team information
- Current team: San Francisco
- Number: 18

Youth career
- –2009: San Francisco

Senior career*
Years	Team	Apps	(Gls)
2009–2011	San Francisco	9	(0)
2011–2012	Sport Boys	0	(0)
2012–2013	Skonto	24	(1)
2013–2015	Veria	4	(0)
2014	→ Independiente (loan)	14	(0)
2014–2015	→ San Francisco (loan)	0	(0)

International career^{‡}
2010–2013	Panama U17	10	(3)
2013–	Panama U20	5	(1)
- * Club domestic league appearances and goals as of 27 June 2014 (UTC) ‡ National team caps and goals as of 16 September 2013

Julio Manuel Segundo Ríos (born 26 September 1993) is a Panamanian footballer, who plays for San Francisco in Liga Panameña de Fútbol as a midfielder.

== Club career ==
He began his career in the quarry of San Francisco . With this club he made his professional debut in 2009 against Chorrillo . That same year he was elected by the Manchester City to train 10 days with the English club. In August 2010 he signed for Sport Boys in the First Division of Peru, but two days after the player had to return home as he did not meet the standards of FIFA for being a minor.

In 2012, he signed for Skonto Riga in the Virsliga. On 25 March 2012 he debuted with Skonto. During his time in Skonto he achieved to perform in twenty four games, score one goal and also play during two UEFA Europa League matches against HNK Hajduk Split, where Skonto were eliminated as they were defeated by 1-2 on aggregate.

In July 2013, the Super League Greece side Veria signed Segundo on a free transfer for 3 years. In June 2014 he joined San Francisco on loan after another loan spell at Independiente.

Segundo mutually terminated his contract with Veria on 28 August 2015.

== Honours ==
=== Skonto F.C. ===
- Latvian Cup winner
  - 2012
- UEFA Europa League games
  - 2012 x2
- Copa Libertadores
  - 2010 x2
