= David Reano =

Argentine footballer

Personal information
- Full name: David Alejandro Reano
- Date of birth: 20 March 1984 (age 42)
- Place of birth: Villa María, Argentina
- Height: 1.79 m (5 ft 10 in)
- Position: Defender

Youth career
- 2004–2006: Boca Juniors

Senior career*
Years	Team	Apps	(Gls)
2006–2008	Aldosivi	18	(0)
2008–2009	Almirante Brown	36	(1)
2009	Alumni	12	(0)
2010–2011	Deportivo Morón	40	(0)
2011–2013	Gloria Bistrița	27	(0)
2013–2014	Veria	2	(0)
2014–2015	Naxxar Lions	29	(2)
2015	Żebbuġ Rangers	12	(0)
2015–2016	Argentino de Monte Maíz		
2016–2017	Alumni	13	(0)
2017	Żebbuġ Rangers		
- * Club domestic league appearances and goals as of 10 July 2019

David Alejandro Reano (born 20 March 1984) is a retired Argentine footballer.

== Career statistics ==
=== Club ===
Club	Season	League			Cup		Other		Total	
Club	Season	Division	Apps	Goals	Apps	Goals	Apps	Goals	Apps	Goals
Gloria Bistrița	2011–12	Liga II	15	0	0	0	0	0	15	0
Gloria Bistrița	2012–13	Liga I	12	0	1 (Note: Appearances in the Cupa României)	0	0	0	13	0
Gloria Bistrița	Total		27	0	1	0	0	0	28	0
Veria	2013–14	Super League Greece	2	0	2 (Note: Appearances in the Greek Football Cup)	0	0	0	4	0
Naxxar Lions	2013–14	Maltese Premier League	14	2	2 (Note: Appearances in the Maltese FA Trophy)	0	0	0	16	2
Naxxar Lions	2014–15	Maltese Premier League	15	0	0	0	0	0	15	0
Naxxar Lions	Total		19	2	2	0	0	0	21	2
Żebbuġ Rangers	2014–15	Maltese Premier League	12	0	0	0	0	0	12	0
Career total			60	2	5	0	0	0	65	2
