= Alexandros Zeris =

Greek footballer

Personal information
- Date of birth: 26 February 1994 (age 32)
- Place of birth: Volos, Greece
- Height: 1.72 m (5 ft 8 in)
- Position: Right-back

Team information
- Current team: Olympiacos Volos

Youth career
- –2010: Niki Volos

Senior career*
Years	Team	Apps	(Gls)
2010–2011	Olympiacos Volos	1	(0)
2011–2013	Panetolikos	0	(0)
2012–2013	→ Pyrasos (loan)		
2013–2016	Olympiacos Volos	58	(0)
2016	AEL	1	(0)
2016–2017	Chania	30	(1)
2017–2018	Volos	26	(4)
2018–2019	Kavala	25	(3)
2019–2023	Panserraikos	68	(2)
2023–2024	Magnisiakos		
2024–	Olympiacos Volos	43	(2)
- * Club domestic league appearances and goals as of 16 June 2023

Alexandros Zeris (Greek: Αλέξανδρος Ζέρης; born 26 February 1994) is a Greek professional footballer who plays as a right-back.

== Career ==
Born in Volos, Zeris began his career at the youth academies of Niki Volos. In 2010, he transferred to Olympiacos Volos. In 2011, he transferred to Panetolikos, but made no appearances with the team and went on loan to Pyrasos. In July 2013, he signed a three-year contract with Olympiacos Volos. In August 2015, he signed a three-year contract with AEL. A year later, on 6 August 2016, Zeris left the club by mutual agreement.

In mid-August 2019, Zeris joined Panserraikos on a free agent.

== Honours ==
Volos

- Gamma Ethniki: 2017–18
