= Dimitrios Tsapalos =

Greek footballer

Personal information
- Full name: Dimitrios Tsapalos
- Date of birth: 13 October 1993 (age 33)
- Place of birth: Patras, Greece
- Height: 1.83 m (6 ft 0 in)
- Position: Goalkeeper

Team information
- Current team: Morpeth Town

Youth career
- Panetolikos

Senior career*
Years	Team	Apps	(Gls)
2012–2013	Panetolikos		
2014–2018	Panegialios	18	(0)
2014–2015	→ Doxa Nea Manolada (loan)		
2018–	Morpeth Town		
- * Club domestic league appearances and goals as of 18 August 2018

Dimitrios Tsapalos (Greek: Δημήτριος Τσάπαλος; born 13 October 1993) is a Greek professional footballer who plays as a goalkeeper for English club Morpeth Town.
