= Konstantinos Barbas =

Greek footballer (born 1983)

Personal information
- Date of birth: 22 April 1983 (age 43)
- Place of birth: Efkarpia, Greece
- Height: 1.86 m (6 ft 1 in)
- Position: Centre back

Youth career
- –2001: Iraklis

Senior career*
Years	Team	Apps	(Gls)
2001–2003	Iraklis	0	(0)
2003–2008	Agrotikos Asteras	139	(8)
2008–2009	Kavala	23	(2)
2009–2010	Agrotikos Asteras	31	(1)
2010–2014	Veria	78	(7)
2014–2015	Olympiacos Volos	27	(1)
2015–2016	Iraklis Ambelokipi	0	(0)
2016	Agrotikos Asteras	14	(1)
2016–2018	Langadas	0	(0)
2018–2019	Agrotikos Asteras		
2019–2020	Niki Efkarpias		
- * Club domestic league appearances and goals as of 15:36, 22 May 2014 (UTC) ‡ National team caps and goals as of 20 September 2013

Konstantinos Barbas (Greek: Κωνσταντίνος Μπάρμπας; born 22 April 1983) is a Greek former footballer who played as a centre back.

== Career ==
Kostas started his career in Iraklis, where he stated for two season after being promoted from the youth system of Iraklis but he didn't achieve any performance with the club. In July 2003, Agrotikos Asteras signed Kostas on a free transfer. He stayed in the team for five years and he performed in one hundred thirty nine matches, while he scored eight goals. In July 2008 Kostas moved on a free transfer to Kavala where he stayed for one season but being a team regular as he played in twenty three games and scored two goals. The following season, he would return in Agrotikos Asteras again as a team regular. In summer of 2010 Veria signed Kostas Barbas for three years. Last summer he renewed his contract till 2014.

On 21 May 2014, Kostas Barbas left Veria as his contract expired.

== Honours ==
=== Veria ===
- Football League: Runner-up: 2011-12

=== Kavala ===
- Football League: Third Placed: 2008-09

=== Agrotikos Asteras ===
- Football League 2: 2005-06
