= Giannis Sentementes =

Greek footballer

Personal information
- Full name: Ioannis Sentementes
- Date of birth: 15 June 1992 (age 34)
- Place of birth: Athens, Greece
- Height: 1.94 m (6 ft 4 1/2 in)
- Position: Defender

Team information
- Current team: Panachaiki

Youth career
- –2008: Iraklis Kalamatas

Senior career*
Years	Team	Apps	(Gls)
2008–2011	Asteras Tripolis	0	(0)
2010–2011	→ Korinthos (loan)	0	(0)
2011	Ionikos	0	(0)
2011–2012	Proodeftiki	0	(0)
2011–2013	Rouvas	20	(2)
2013–2014	Veria	1	(0)
2014–	Panachaiki	1	(0)
- * Club domestic league appearances and goals as of 15 September 2013 ‡ National team caps and goals as of 15 September 2013

Giannis Sentementes (born 15 June 1992) is a Greek footballer who plays for Panachaiki in the Football League (Greece) as a defender.
