= Lazaros Charitonidis =

Greek footballer (born 1989)

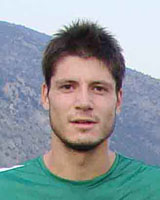

Personal information
- Date of birth: 18 December 1989 (age 36)
- Place of birth: Komotini, Greece
- Height: 1.89 m (6 ft 2 1/2 in)
- Position: Defender

Senior career*
Years	Team	Apps	(Gls)
2006–2009	Skoda Xanthi	2	(0)
2009–2010	Panthrakikos	4	(0)
2010–2016	OFI	5	(0)
2016–2017	Aris	7	(0)
- * Club domestic league appearances and goals as of 17 June 2017

Lazaros Charitonidis (Greek: Λάζαρος Χαριτωνίδης, born 18 December 1989) is a Greek footballer.

== Career ==
Charitonidis career began in 2009 at the age of 19 when he signed a professional contract with Panthrakikos.

In summer 2016, he signed with major Greek club Aris.

== Personal life ==
Charitonidis is married with the Greek triple jumper Paraskevi Papachristou. The couple has a daughter.

== Career statistics ==
season	club	league	Championship		Nation cup		Europe cup		Total	
season	club	league	appear	goals	appear	goals	appear	goals	appear	goals
2009–10	Panthrakikos	Super League	4	0	0	0	0	0	4	0
2010-11	Panthrakikos	Beta Ethniki								
career total			4	0	0	0	0	0	4	0

Last update: 28 June 2010
