= Sebastian Przyrowski =

Polish footballer

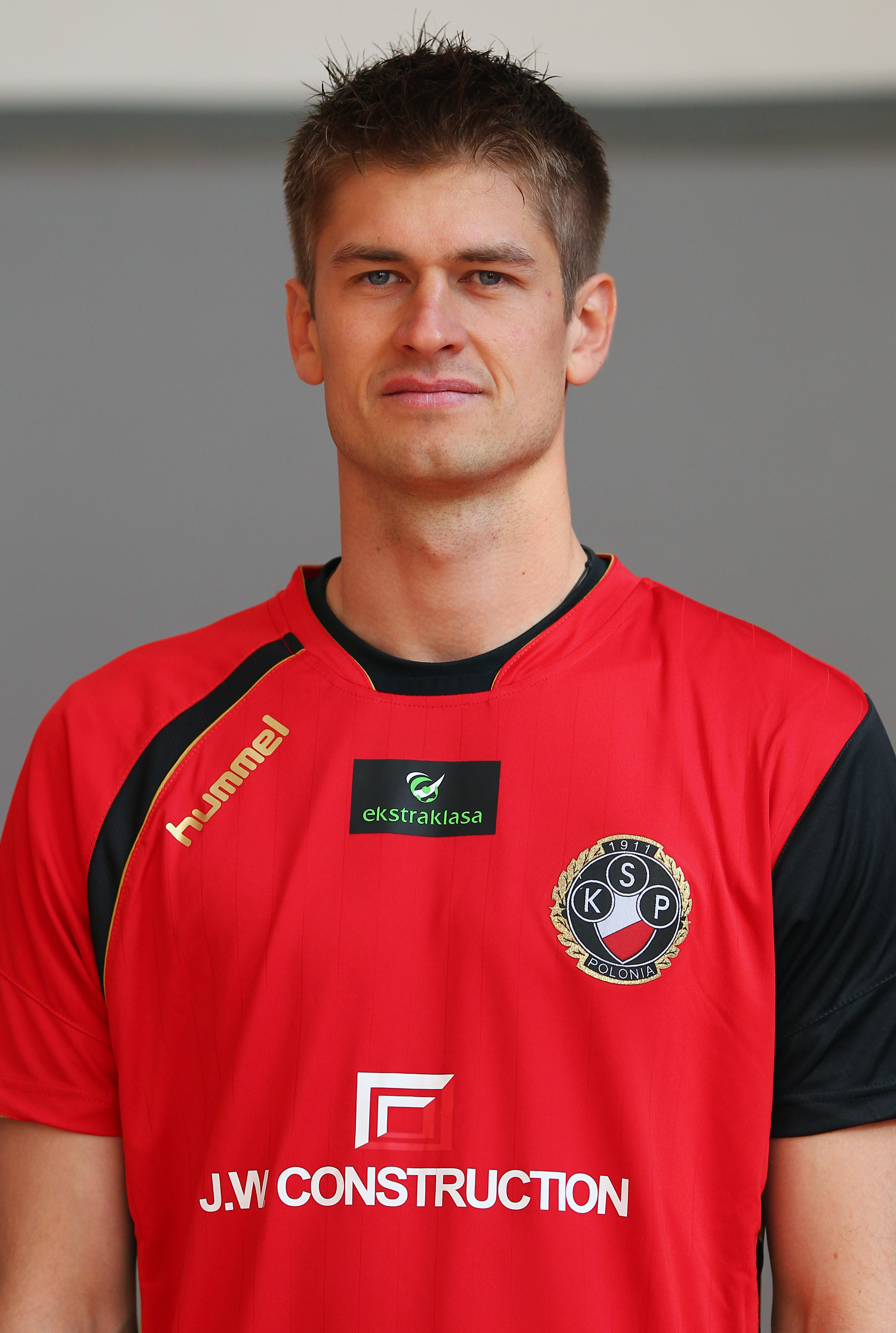
- Przyrowski with Polonia Warsaw in 2011

Personal information
- Date of birth: 30 November 1981 (age 44)
- Place of birth: Białobrzegi, Poland
- Height: 1.92 m (6 ft 3 1/2 in)
- Position: Goalkeeper

Team information
- Current team: Znicz Pruszków (goalkeeping coach)

Youth career
- –1999: Pilica Białobrzegi
- 1999–2000: Polonia Warsaw II
- 2000–2002: Pilica Białobrzegi

Senior career*
| Years | Team | Apps | (Gls) |
| 2002–2008 | Dyskobolia Grodzisk Wielkopolski | 96 | (0) |
| 2004 | → Obra Kościan (loan) | | |
| 2008–2013 | Polonia Warsaw | 105 | (0) |
| 2013–2014 | Levadiakos | 19 | (0) |
| 2015 | GKS Tychy | 14 | (0) |
| 2015–2016 | Górnik Zabrze | 5 | (0) |
| 2016–2018 | Pilica Białobrzegi | | |
| 2018–2022 | Pogoń Grodzisk Mazowiecki | 63 | (0) |

International career
| 2005–2010 | Poland | 9 | (0) |
- * Club domestic league appearances and goals

Sebastian Przyrowski (born 30 November 1981) is a Polish former professional footballer who played as a goalkeeper. He is currently the goalkeeping coach of II liga club Znicz Pruszków.

== Career ==
In 2000, Polonia Warsaw acquired Przyrowski from Pilica Białobrzegi. He only played in Polonia's reserve team, so he returned to Pilica during the winter transfer window. In 2001, he moved to Dyskobolia Grodzisk Wielkopolski. He debuted in the Polish first division on 2 March 2002, playing against Górnik Zabrze. In 2008, he moved to the Polish capital after Dyskobolia merged with Polonia Warsaw.

Przyrowski made his first appearance for the Poland national team in 2005, in a match against Serbia and Montenegro. He has played a total of nine times for his country.

== Honours ==
Dyskobolia

- Polish Cup: 2006–07
- Ekstraklasa Cup: 2006–07, 2007–08

Pogoń Grodzisk Mazowiecki

- III liga, group I: 2020–21
- IV liga Masovia South: 2018–19
