= Nikolaos Georgiadis =

Greek footballer

Personal information
- Date of birth: 23 March 1983 (age 43)
- Place of birth: Toronto, Canada
- Height: 1.81 m (5 ft 11 1/2 in)
- Position: Right back

Senior career*
Years	Team	Apps	(Gls)
2004–2005	Kozani	32	(4)
2005–2010	PAS Giannina	44	(3)
2010	Diagoras	21	(1)
2010–2014	Veria	100	(2)
2014	Levadiakos	13	(0)
2015–2016	Aris	29	(0)
2016–2019	Apollon Pontus	57	(2)
2020	Veria	4	(0)
- * Club domestic league appearances and goals as of 18 August 2020

Nikolaos Georgiadis (Greek: Νικόλαος Γεωργιάδης; born 23 March 1983) is a Greek former professional footballer who played as a right back.

== Honours ==
=== Veria ===
- Football League: Runner-up: 2011–12

=== PAS Giannina ===
- Football League: Runner-up: 2008–09
