= Evgenios Kitsas =

Greek footballer

Personal information
- Full name: Evgenios Kitsas
- Date of birth: 12 August 1982 (age 44)
- Place of birth: Alexandreia, Greece
- Height: 1.79 m (5 ft 10 1/2 in)
- Position: Forward

Senior career*
Years	Team	Apps	(Gls)
2001–2004	Egaleo F.C.	12	(0)
2002–2003	Leonidio F.C.	18	(5)
2004–2005	Kalamata F.C.	2	(0)
2005	Acharnaikos F.C.	1	(0)
2005–2006	Achilleas Neokastrou		
2006–2007	AE Alexandrias		
2007–2008	Olympiakos Chersonissos F.C.		
2008	Mochos		
2009–2010	Olympiakos Chersonissos F.C.	39	(18)
2010	Platanias F.C.	12	(0)
2011	Olympiakos Chersonissos F.C.	10	(1)
2011–2012	PAOK Alexandria		
2012–2013	Panetolikos F.C.	1	(0)
2013–2015	Chersonissos		
2016–2017	PAOK Alexandria		
2017	Doxa Mavrovouniou		
2017–2019	Niki Agathias		
2019–2020	Asteras Tripotamou		
- * Club domestic league appearances and goals

Evgenios Kitsas (Greek: Ευγένιος Κίτσας; born 12 August 1982) is a former professional footballer.

== Career ==
Kitsas has spent most of his career in the lower leagues of Greek football. He signed with Panetolikos F.C. in the summer of 2012, after spending two weeks with the team on trial. However, he was released on 7 January 2013, after having made only one appearance for the club.
