= Georgios Tzintzis =

Greek footballer

Personal information
- Full name: Georgios Tzintzis
- Date of birth: 16 July 1993 (age 33)
- Place of birth: Greece
- Position: Defender

Team information
- Current team: Makedonikos F.C.

Youth career
- 2010–2012: Panetolikos

Senior career*
Years	Team	Apps	(Gls)
2012–2013	Panetolikos	1	(0)
2013–	Makedonikos F.C.	13	(0)
- * Club domestic league appearances and goals

Georgios Tzintzis (Greek: Γεώργιος Τζιντζής; born 16 July 1993) is a professional footballer who plays for Makedonikos F.C.

== Career ==
Tzintzis began his career with the youth club of Panetolikos in 2010. He signed his first professional contract with Panetolikos in August 2012. He made his first-team debut on 18 November 2012, playing against Anagennisi Giannitsa F.C. for the 2012-2013 Greek Football League.

After being released by Panetolikos in the summer of 2013, he signed with Makedonikos F.C.
