= Armiche Ortega =

Spanish footballer

Armiche
Personal information
- Full name: Armiche Ortega Medina
- Date of birth: 12 June 1988 (age 38)
- Place of birth: Las Palmas, Spain
- Height: 1.76 m (5 ft 9 1/2 in)
- Position: Attacking midfielder

Team information
- Current team: Arucas

Youth career
- Levante
- Unión Viera

Senior career*
Years	Team	Apps	(Gls)
2008–2011	Las Palmas B		
2009–2011	Las Palmas	28	(1)
2010	→ Benidorm (loan)	9	(1)
2011–2013	Valencia B	50	(9)
2013–2015	Levadiakos	46	(2)
2015	Cracovia	6	(0)
2015–2016	Barakaldo	33	(4)
2016	Pandurii	1	(0)
2016–2017	Burgos	35	(0)
2017–2018	OFI	7	(3)
2018	Lamia	3	(0)
2018	Sport Boys	10	(1)
2018–2019	Aris Limassol	27	(13)
2019–2020	ASIL Lysi	18	(2)
2020–2025	Atlético Paso	138	(24)
2025–	Arucas	0	(0)
- * Club domestic league appearances and goals as of 1 July 2025

Armiche Ortega Medina (born 12 June 1988), known simply as Armiche, is a Spanish professional footballer who plays for Tercera Federación club Arucas as an attacking midfielder.
