= Nikolaos Anastasopoulos =

Greek professional footballer

Personal information
- Date of birth: 5 August 1979 (age 47)
- Place of birth: Thessaloniki, Greece
- Height: 1.91 m (6 ft 3 in)
- Position: Goalkeeper

Senior career*
Years	Team	Apps	(Gls)
1997–1999	Naoussa	6	(0)
1999–2001	PAOK	0	(0)
2001–2006	Skoda Xanthi	32	(0)
2006–2007	AEK Larnaca	4	(0)
2007–2011	Asteras Tripolis	35	(0)
2011–2013	Kerkyra	31	(0)
2013–2014	Veria	13	(0)
2014–2016	Skoda Xanthi	1	(0)

International career
1998–2002	Greece U-21	17	(0)
- * Club domestic league appearances and goals as of 22 May 2014

Nikolaos Anastasopoulos (Greek: Νικόλαος Αναστασόπουλος; born 5 August 1979) is a Greek former professional footballer who played as a goalkeeper.

== Early life ==
Anastasopoulos was born in the city of Thessaloniki in the Greek region of Macedonia.

== Career ==
Anastasopoulos began his career in Naoussa In the summer 1999, he signed for PAOK. After one and half year, Anastasopoulos was uncapped and left from the club in January 2001, due to financial problems. He joined at Xanthi F.C. and played there for 5,5 years. Then, hemoved to Larnaca, Cyprus and played for AEK Larnaca and only played there for the year and then moved back to Greece to play for Tripoli bases club Asteras Tripoli and was settled there for 4 years and then decided to move on to Corfu on the island of Kerkyra to play for Kerkyra and played there for two years and then he moved once again, this time to Veria to play for Veria and played there for a year and then in 2014 he decided to return to where it all began at Skoda Xanthi and played their for one year and in the summer of 2015, he was released from the club.
