= Panagiotis Plavoukos =

Greek footballer

Personal information
- Full name: Panagiotis Plavoukos
- Date of birth: 21 October 1994 (age 32)
- Place of birth: Athens, Greece
- Height: 1.79 m (5 ft 10 in)
- Position: Striker

Team information
- Current team: Aittitos Spata
- Number: 33

Youth career
- –2012: Thrasyvoulos

Senior career*
Years	Team	Apps	(Gls)
2012–2013	Thrasyvoulos	35	(2)
2013–2014	Veria	1	(0)
2014	→ Asteras Magoulas (loan)	2	(0)
2014–2015	Zakynthos	18	(1)
2015–2016	Panelefsiniakos	27	(4)
2016–2017	Acharnaikos	30	(2)
2017–2018	Anagennisi Karditsa	29	(4)
2018–2019	Kallithea	0	(0)
2019–	Aittitos Spata	3	(0)
- * Club domestic league appearances and goals as of 30 March 2019

Panagiotis Plavoukos (Greek: Παναγιώτης Πλαβούκος; born 21 October 1994) is a Greek footballer who plays for Aittitos Spata.

== Career ==
Panagiotis started his professional career in Thrasyvoulos. Plavoukos came up through Thrasyvoulos youth system, he was promoted to the first team squad in 2012 eventually becoming a regular starter. He played in thirty five matches. Plavoukos impressed Veria's scouting team and was signed on a free transfer until 2016. On 20 August 2014 Panagiotis agreed to a mutual termination with Veria.
