= Stefanos Siontis =

Greek footballer

Personal information
- Date of birth: 4 September 1987 (age 39)
- Place of birth: Ioannina, Greece
- Height: 1.80 m (5 ft 11 in)
- Position: Defensive midfielder

Senior career*
Years	Team	Apps	(Gls)
2005–2009	Panathinaikos	4	(0)
2006–2007	→ Ethnikos Asteras (loan)	3	(0)
2009–2011	Kavala	27	(1)
2011–2012	Panetolikos	22	(0)
2012–2013	Doxa Katokopias	28	(1)
2013–2014	Veria	18	(0)
2014	Doxa Katokopias	15	(0)
2014–2015	Kerkyra	16	(0)
2015–2016	Veria	21	(0)
2016–2018	Kerkyra	53	(1)
2018–2022	PAS Giannina	53	(0)
2022–2023	Panserraikos	12	(0)

International career
2004–2007	Greece U19	5	(0)
- * Club domestic league appearances and goals as of 16 June 2023

Stefanos Siontis (Greek: Στέφανος Σιόντης; born 4 September 1987) is a Greek former professional footballer who played as a defensive midfielder.

He was also part of Greece Under 21 team.

== Career ==
On 1 July 2009 Kavala announced the transfer of Siontis for an undisclosed fee. On 27 July 2011, he signed a 1-year contract with Panetolikos.

On 23 August 2013 Veria announced the transfer of Siontis on a free transfer. His contract is due to expire on 30 June 2014.

After Kerkyra's relegation Siontis was released on a free transfer. On 26 August 2015, Siontis returned to Veria as he signed a one-year contract. Siontis debuted on 29 August 2015 for Veria in an away match against Panthrakikos, he played the entire match. On 13 May 2018, PAS Giannina officially announced the signing of experienced defensive midfielder Stefanos Siontis on a two years' contract, who was released from Kerkyra The 31-year-old player scored one goal at 25 Super League performances with manager Giannis Matzourakis' team during 2017–18 season.

On 13 May 2018 Siontis signed for 2 years with PAS Giannina.

== Honours ==
PAS Giannina

- Super League 2: 2019–20
