= Zezinho (Bissau-Guinean footballer) =

Bissau-Guinean footballer

Personal information
- Full name: José Luís Mendes Lopes
- Date of birth: 23 September 1992 (age 34)
- Place of birth: Bissau, Guinea-Bissau
- Height: 1.76 m (5 ft 9 1/2 in)
- Position: Midfielder

Team information
- Current team: Omonia Aradippou
- Number: 77

Youth career
- Sporting Bissau
- 2008–2011: Sporting CP

Senior career*
Years	Team	Apps	(Gls)
2008	Sporting Bissau	6	(0)
2011–2014	Sporting CP	5	(0)
2011–2012	→ Atlético (loan)	22	(0)
2012–2016	Sporting CP B	61	(2)
2013–2014	→ Veria (loan)	25	(1)
2014	→ AEL Limassol (loan)	2	(0)
2016–2017	Levadiakos	17	(0)
2018–2019	Senica	39	(0)
2019	Damac	11	(0)
2021	Marsaxlokk	4	(0)
2021–	Omonia Aradippou	27	(0)

International career^{‡}
2010–	Guinea-Bissau	31	(2)
- * Club domestic league appearances and goals as of 20:10, 1 November 2022 (UTC) ‡ National team caps and goals as of 25 June 2019

José Luís Mendes Lopes (born 23 September 1992), known as Zezinho, is a Bissau-Guinean professional footballer who plays as a midfielder for Cypriot club Omonia Aradippou and the Guinea-Bissau national team.

== Club career ==
Born in Bissau, Zezinho finished his development with Sporting CP after joining its youth system at the age of 16. He made his debut as a senior in the 2011–12 season, being loaned to Atlético Clube de Portugal and helping them to the ninth position in the Segunda Liga.

Subsequently, returned to the Estádio José Alvalade, Zezinho appeared almost exclusively with the B team during his tenure. His maiden Primeira Liga appearance occurred on 13 January 2013, as he came on as a 75th-minute substitute for Zakaria Labyad in a 2–0 away win against S.C. Olhanense.

Zezinho served a further two loans before being released in June 2016, at Veria F.C. from the Super League Greece and Cypriot First Division club AEL Limassol.

== International career ==
Zezinho earned his first cap for Guinea-Bissau on 4 September 2010 – 19 days before his 18th birthday – in a 1–0 home victory over Kenya for the 2012 Africa Cup of Nations qualifiers. Selected to the 2017 edition of the tournament by manager Baciro Candé, he featured in three games in an eventual group stage exit.

Zezinho was also included in the 2019 Africa Cup of Nations squad.

=== International goals ===
As of 4 June 2016 (Guinea-Bissau score listed first, score column indicates score after each Zezinho goal)

No	Date	Venue	Opponent	Score	Result	Competition
1.	5 September 2015	24 de Setembro, Bissau, Guinea-Bissau	Congo	1–3	2–4	2017 Africa Cup of Nations qualification
2.	4 June 2016	24 de Setembro, Bissau, Guinea-Bissau	Zambia	1–0	3–2	2017 Africa Cup of Nations qualification
