= Horacio Cardozo =

Argentine footballer

Personal information
- Full name: Horacio Ramón Cardozo
- Date of birth: 29 November 1979 (age 46)
- Place of birth: Goya, Argentina
- Height: 1.73 m (5 ft 8 in)
- Positions: Central midfielder; defensive midfielder

Youth career
- 1991–1997: Estudiantes de La Plata

Senior career*
Years	Team	Apps	(Gls)
1998–2007	Estudiantes	151	(2)
2002	→ Nueva Chicago (loan)	16	(0)
2006	→ Quilmes (loan)	7	(0)
2007	→ Nueva Chicago (loan)	11	(1)
2007–2010	Asteras Tripolis	75	(2)
2010–2011	Kavala	22	(0)
2012	Colo-Colo	8	(0)
2012	Colo-Colo B	2	(0)
2013	Apollon Limassol	11	(0)
2013–2014	Ergotelis	26	(0)
2014–2016	Kerkyra	34	(0)
2017	Jorge Newbery VM	5	(0)
2017–2018	Deportivo Madryn	23	(0)
- * Club domestic league appearances and goals

Horacio Ramón Cardozo (Spanish pronunciation: [oˈɾasjo raˈmoŋ kaɾˈðoso], born 29 November 1979) is an Argentine former footballer. He played as a central or defensive midfielder.

== Club career ==
=== Argentina and Greece ===
He played several years for Estudiantes de la Plata. He has also played for Asteras Tripolis, Nueva Chicago and Quilmes Atlético Club.

In the season of 2007–08, he was one of Asteras' standout players during the club's first season in the top flight. After being one of the top Asteras Tripolis' players many big clubs showed interest to buy him such as Sevilla.

In June 2010, Cardozo almost joined Olympiacos as a free agent after 3 successful years in Tripoli playing for Asteras Tripolis, but the transfer failed due to a disagreement in terms.

In July 2010, Cardozo joined Kavala, abandoning that team the following season.

=== Colo-Colo ===
On 24 December 2011, it was reported that Cardozo would be the new central midfielder of Primera División powerhouse club Colo-Colo on a one−year contract.

On 26 December, Cardozo arrived in Chile to sign his contract with the club that would keep him at Macul until January 2013, and alongside Mathías Vidangossy and Miguel Ángel González was officially presented on 2 January. Cardozo also stated that when Kavala were demoted from the Super League Greece, he returned to Argentina for training with Estudiantes de La Plata, saying also that joining Colo-Colo was a dream for him. He made his Primera División debut in a 2–2 draw against Cobresal at El Salvador on 12 February.

On 30 December 2012, according to Terra Chile, the newspaper of El Mercurio ensured that Cardozo and Blanco y Negro reached an agreement for his departure, whence he received US$50.000 as compensation.

=== Cyprus and return to Greece ===
Cadozo returned to Europe signing a one-year contract with Apollon Limassol for an undisclosed fee. On 22 May 2013, Apollon Limassol clinched their seventh Cypriot Cup on final after beating cross-town rivals AEL Limassol 2–1 in a thrilling encounter that was decided in extra-time. A goal from substitute Horacio Cardozo and a late penalty from Romeo Surdu saw Apollon prevail at the Tsirion Stadium in the neighbours' first cup final meeting since 1987. In the summer of 2013, Horacio Cardozo transferred from Apollon Limassol to Ergotelis Heraklion on a free transfer.

On 24 July 2014, he signed a one-year contract with Super League Greece side Kerkyra.

=== Back in Argentina ===
His last clubs were Jorge Newbery VM (2017) and Deportivo Madryn (2017–18).

== Career statistics ==
=== Club ===
Club	Season	League		Cup		International		Total	
Club	Season	Apps	Goals	Apps	Goals	Apps	Goals	Apps	Goals
Quilmes	2006	7	0	–	–	–	–	7	0
Quilmes	Total	7	0	–	–	–	–	7	0
Nueva Chicago	2007	11	1	–	–	–	–	11	1
Nueva Chicago	Total	11	1	–	–	–	–	11	1
Asteras Tripolis	2007–08	32	1	–	–	–	–	32	1
Asteras Tripolis	2008–09	25	1	–	–	–	–	25	1
Asteras Tripolis	2009–10	18	0	–	–	–	–	18	0
Asteras Tripolis	Total	75	2	–	–	–	–	75	2
Kavala	2010–11	22	0	2	0	–	–	24	0
Kavala	Total	22	0	2	0	–	–	24	0
Colo-Colo	2012	8	0	–	–	–	–	8	0
Colo-Colo	Total	8	0	–	–	–	–	8	0
Apollon Limassol	2012-13	11	0	4	1	–	–	15	1
Apollon Limassol	Total	11	0	4	1	–	–	15	1
Ergotelis	2013-14	26	0	-	-	–	–	26	0
Ergotelis	Total	26	0	-	-	–	–	26	0
Kerkyra	2014-15	21	0	3	0	–	–	24	0
Kerkyra	Total	21	0	3	0	–	–	24	0
Career Total		181	3	9	1	–	–	190	4
