= 2014–15 Veria F.C. season =

Veria
2014–15 season
- Chairman: Theodoros Karipidis
- Manager: Dimitris Christoforidis
- Stadium: Veria Stadium, Veria
- Super League: 13th
- Greek Cup: Third round
- Top goalscorer: League: Nikos Kaltsas (12 goals); All: Nikos Kaltsas (13 goals)
- Highest home attendance: 2,037 (vs PAS Giannina)
- Lowest home attendance: 663 (vs Niki Volos)
Home colours	Away colours	Third colours

In season 2014–15, Veria competed in the following competitions Super League and Greek Cup.

== Players ==
=== Squad information ===
No.	Name	Nationality	Position (s)	Date of birth (age)	Signed from
Goalkeepers
1	Georgios Kantimiris	(Greece)	GK	19 September 1982 (31)	(Greece) Fokikos
22	Xavi Ginard	(Spain)	GK	11 October 1986 (27)	(Spain) Atlético Baleares
71	Dimitris Chomsioglou	(Greece)	GK	8 March 1989 (25)	(Greece) Anagennisi Giannitsa
Defenders
4	José Catalá	(Spain)	LB	1 January 1985 (29)	(Cyprus) Apollon Limassol
23	Dimitrios Amarantidis	(Greece)	LB	27 July 1986 (28)	(Greece) AEK Athens
2	Raúl Bravo	(Spain)	LB/CB	14 April 1981 (33)	(Spain) Córdoba
5	Angelos Vertzos	(Greece)	LB/CB	27 May 1983 (31)	(Greece) Apollon Smyrnis
16	Neto	(Brazil)	RB	7 February 1981 (33)	(Argentina) Bahia
18	Iván Malón	(Spain)	RB	26 August 1986 (27)	(Spain) Mirandés
3	Cyril Kali	(France)	RB/CB	21 January 1984 (30)	(Greece) Panetolikos
55	Stelios Marangos	(Greece)	CB	4 May 1989 (25)	(Greece) Kerkyra
8	Branko Ostojić	(Serbia)	CB/DM/CM	3 January 1984 (31)	(Serbia) Javor
Midfielders
6	Roberto Battión	(Argentina)	DM	1 March 1982 (32)	(Argentina) Independiente
25	Sotiris Balafas	(Greece)	DM	19 August 1986 (28)	(Ukraine) Hoverla
14	David Vázquez	(Spain)	CM	21 March 1986 (28)	(Spain) Melilla
30	Carlos Caballero	(Spain)	CM	5 October 1984 (30)	(Spain) Córdoba
24	Jokin Esparza	(Spain)	CM	15 June 1988 (25)	(Spain) Huesca
21	Alexandros Vergonis	(Greece)	CM	1 December 1985 (28)	(Greece) Rodos
19	Cédric Mandjeck	(Cameroon)	CM/AM	8 April 1993 (21)	(Spain) Valencia B
32	Charalampos Pavlidis	(Greece)	CM/AM	6 May 1991 (23)	Youth system
11	Kenan Bargan	(Greece)	LW	25 October 1988 (26)	(Greece) Odysseas Anagennisi
7	Nikos Kaltsas	(Greece)	RW	3 May 1990 (24)	Youth system
77	Giorgos Georgiadis	(Greece)	LW/RW	14 November 1987 (26)	(Greece) PAOK
15	Pedro Arce	(Mexico)	AM/RW	25 November 1991 (22)	(Greece) Kavala
29	Andreas Tatos	(Greece)	AM	11 May 1989 (25)	(Greece) Atromitos
31	Ben Nabouhane	(Comoros)	AM/CF	10 June 1989 (25)	(France) Vannes
Forwards
9	Javier Cámpora	(Argentina)	CF	7 January 1980 (34)	(Argentina) All Boys
12	Nicolao Dumitru	(Italy)	CF	12 October 1991 (22)	(Italy) Napoli
13	Thomas Nazlidis	(Greece)	CF	23 October 1987 (27)	(Greece) Platanias
92	Theo Markelis	(Australia)	CF	24 June 1992 (22)	(Spain) Hércules B

=== Out on loan ===
Note: Flags indicate national team as defined under FIFA eligibility rules; some limited exceptions apply. Players may hold more than one non-FIFA nationality.

No. / Pos. / Nation / Player; — / MF / GRE / Marios Papadopoulos (to (Greece) Aris)	No. / Pos. / Nation / Player; — / MF / PAN / Julio Segundo (to (Panama) San Francisco)

Last updated: 28 January 2015
Source: Squad at Veria FC official website

=== Transfers ===
==== Summer transfers ====
In: Note: Flags indicate national team as defined under FIFA eligibility rules; some limited exceptions apply. Players may hold more than one non-FIFA nationality.

No.	Pos.	Nation	Player
—	MF	ARG	Roberto Battión (from Independiente)
—	FW	ARG	Javier Cámpora (from All Boys)
—	FW	AUS	Theo Markelis (from Hércules B)
—	MF	CMR	Cédric Mandjeck (from Valencia B)
—	GK	GRE	Georgios Vasileiadis (from Veria U-20)
—	GK	GRE	Dimitris Chomsioglou (from Anagennisi Giannitsa)
—	DF	GRE	Sotiris Balafas (from Hoverla)
—	MF	GRE	Vangelis Tsiamis (from Anagennisi Karditsa)
—	MF	GRE	Marios Papadopoulos (from Agotikos Asteras)
—	MF	GRE	Giorgos Georgiadis (from PAOK)
—	MF	GRE	Kostas Panagiotoudis (on loan from PAOK)
—	MF	GRE	Giorgos Katidis (from Novara)
—	DF	FRA	Cyril Kali (from Panetolikos)
—	FW	ITA	Nicolao Dumitru (on loan from Napoli)
—	MF	MEX	Pedro Arce (from Kavala)
—	FW	NED	Nigel Hasselbaink (from St Johnstone)
—	FW	SRB	Zvonimir Vukić (from PAOK)
—	GK	ESP	Xavi Ginard (from Atlético Baleares)
—	DF	ESP	Raúl Bravo (from Córdoba)
—	DF	ESP	Iván Malón (from Mirandés)
—	DF	ESP	José Catalá (from Apollon Limassol)
—	MF	ESP	David Vázquez (from Melilla)
—	MF	ESP	Jokin Esparza (from Huesca)

Out: Note: Flags indicate national team as defined under FIFA eligibility rules; some limited exceptions apply. Players may hold more than one non-FIFA nationality.

No.	Pos.	Nation	Player
—	GK	GRE	Nikolaos Anastasopoulos (released)
—	DF	GRE	Nikolaos Georgiadis (released)
—	DF	GRE	Nikos Tzimogiannis (released)
—	DF	GRE	Konstantinos Barbas (released)
—	DF	GRE	Alexandros Apostolopoulos (loan return to PAOK)
—	MF	GRE	Stefanos Siontis (released)
—	MF	GRE	Marios Papadopoulos (on loan to Aris)
—	FW	GRE	Panagiotis Plavoukos (to Ethnikos Gazoros)
—	MF	RUS	Pavel Komolov (loan return to Zalgiris Vilnius)
—	MF	CZE	Petr Trapp (loan return to Viktoria)
—	DF	FRA	Mohamadou Sissoko (released)
—	FW	POR	Esmaël Gonçalves (released)
—	MF	ESP	Guille (released)
—	DF	GBS	Zézinho (loan return to Sporting)

==== Winter transfers ====
In: Note: Flags indicate national team as defined under FIFA eligibility rules; some limited exceptions apply. Players may hold more than one non-FIFA nationality.

No.	Pos.	Nation	Player
—	DF	BRA	Neto (Free transfer)
—	DF	GRE	Stelios Marangos (from (Greece) Kerkyra)
—	MF	GRE	Andreas Tatos (from (Greece) Atromitos)
—	MF	ESP	Carlos Caballero (on loan from (Spain) Córdoba)
—	FW	GRE	Thomas Nazlidis (from (Greece) Platanias)

Out: Note: Flags indicate national team as defined under FIFA eligibility rules; some limited exceptions apply. Players may hold more than one non-FIFA nationality.

No.	Pos.	Nation	Player
—	MF	GRE	Kostas Panagiotoudis (loan return to (Greece) PAOK)
—	DF	GRE	Vangelis Tsiamis (to (Greece) Acharnaikos)
—	MF	GRE	Giorgos Katidis (to (Greece) Levadiakos)
—	FW	NED	Nigel Hasselbaink (released)
—	FW	SRB	Zvonimir Vukić (released)

== Technical and medical staff ==
Technical staff
Head coach	(Greece) Dimitris Christoforidis
Assistant coach	(Greece) Antonis Sarioglou
Assistant coach	(Brazil) King
Goalkeeping coach	(Greece) Dimitris Kottaridis
Fitness coach	(Spain) Jesús Puente Solana
Fitness coach	(Serbia) Goran Guzijan
Youth team coach	(Greece) Stefanos Gaitanos
Provisor	(Greece) Thanasis Voulgaris
Scouting staff
Scout	(Greece) Vasilis Zoumpoulidis
Medical staff
Physio	(Greece) Anastasios Tiflidis
Masseur	(Greece) Fotis Konstantakos
Masseur	(Greece) Dimitris Lamprinidis
Pathologist	(Greece) Georgios Avramopoulos
Orthopedist	(Greece) Nikolaos Dimou
Urologist	(Greece) Georgios Minas
Surgeon	(Greece) Prodromos Isaakidis
Dentist	(Greece) Despοina Karvouna
Νutritionist	(Greece) Athanasios Topis

== Season milestones ==
- On August 6, 2014, it was announced by Georgios Arvanitidis that he is in takeover talks with the local businessman Theodoros Karipidis.
- The first goal in 2014–15 Super League was scored by Alexandros Vergonis against Skoda Xanthi in a 3–2 home victory on 24 August 2014.
- On September 14, 2014, the football players of Veria released an announcement, reporting the Argentinian player of Kerkyra, Horacio Cardozo for a racist attack to the Italian football player of the club, Nicolao Dumitru.
- The first goal in 2014–15 Greek Cup was scored by Nicolao Dumitru on 24 September 2014 in a 4–1 home victory against Ermionida.
- On 8 October 2014 it was announced that the owner change was completely as Giorgos Arvanitidis moved his sharehold to Theodoros Karipidis.
- On 12 January 2015, Iván Malón was invited by the district attorney to testify about the game between PAOK vs Veria, which is marked as suspected fixed match.
- On 7 May 2015, Giorgos Lanaris quit his post of team manager as he appears to be involved in a fixed game against Olympiacos F.C. back in 2012–13 season.
- On 20 May 2015, Super League's court found Veria innocent as she was accused for fixing the game against Olympiacos F.C. in 2013.

== Fixtures and results ==
=== Overall ===
Competition	Started round	Current position / round	Final position / round	First match	Last match
Super League Greece	Regular season	14th	14th	24 August 2014	10 May 2015
Greek Cup	Third round	Third round	Third round	24 September 2014	28 January 2015

Last updated: 28 December 2014
Source: Competitions

=== Pre-season friendlies ===
Win Draw Loss Upcoming fixture

19 July 2014 Friendly	Kerkyra	2 – 1	Veria	Naousa, Greece
18:00 (UTG+3)		Report

25 July 2014 Friendly	Skoda Xanthi	1 – 1	Veria	Skoda Xanthi Arena
20:00 (UTG+3)		Report

30 July 2014 Friendly	Veria	0 – 1	PAS Giannina	Veria Stadium, Greece
18:00 (UTG+3)		Report

6 August 2014 Friendly	Veria	0 – 1	AEL	Veria Stadium, Veria
19:00 (UTG+3)		Report

10 August 2014 Friendly	Niki Volos	3 – 2	Veria	Panthessaliko Stadium, Volos
19:00 (UTG+3)		Report

13 August 2014 Friendly	PAS Giannina	4 – 2	Veria	Zosimades Stadium, Ioannina
18:30 (UTG+3)		Report

17 August 2014 Friendly	Veria	2 – 1	Panthrakikos	Veria Stadium, Veria
19:30 (UTG+3)		Report

==== Fixtures ====
24 August 2014 1	Veria	3 – 2	Skoda Xanthi	Veria
19.15 (UTC+3)	Vergonis 41'; Ben 49'; Cyril Kali (yellow card) 59'; Vázquez (yellow card) 79'; Amarantidis (yellow card) 82'; Dumitru 83'	Report	Obodo 77'; Lucero 80' (pen.); Wallace (yellow card) 81'	Stadium: Veria Stadium; Attendance: 1,392; Referee: (Greece) A. Papapetrou; Man of the Match: (Comoros) Ben

1 September 2014 2	OFI	0 – 1	Veria	Heraklion
21.30 (UTC+3)	Petropoulos (yellow card) 11'; Milhazes (yellow card) 77'; Moniakis (yellow card) 84'; Adeleye (yellow card) 90+5'	Report	Bravo (yellow card) 17'; Kaltsas 58'; Catalá (yellow card) 90'; Vertzos (yellow card) 90+3'; Kantimiris (yellow card) 90+4'	Stadium: Theodoros Vardinogiannis Stadium; Attendance: 4,592; Referee: (Greece) D. Styliaras; Man of the Match: (Greece) Nikos Kaltsas

13 September 2014 3	Veria	2 – 1	Kerkyra	Veria
16:00 (UTC+3)	Cámpora 29'; Dumitru 57'; Vázquez (yellow card) 69'; Amarantidis (yellow card) 73'	Report	Javito 1'; Sánchez (yellow card) 67'; Gomes (yellow card) 90+1'	Stadium: Veria Stadium; Attendance: 1,325; Referee: (Greece) C. Mitsios; Man of the Match: (Italy) Nicolao Dumitru

20 September 2014 4	Olympiacos	3 – 0	Veria	Piraeus
20:30 (UTC+3)	Kasami (yellow card) 67'; Mitroglou (pen.), 33'; Elabdellaoui (yellow card) 81'; Roberto (yellow card) 82'; Benítez 88'; Kasami 90+2'	Report	Amarantidis (yellow card) 23'	Stadium: Karaiskakis Stadium; Attendance: 17,594; Referee: (Greece) C. Kalogeropoulos; Man of the Match: (Switzerland) Pajtim Kasami

28 September 2014 5	Veria	2 – 0	PAS Giannina	Veria
18:15 (UTC+3)	Georgiadis (yellow card) 29'; Cámpora (yellow card) 35', (goal) 54'; Kaltsas 55'; Vertzos (yellow card) 82'	Report	Georgios Dasios (yellow card) 22, 39' (yellow-red card)	Stadium: Veria Stadium; Attendance: 2,037; Referee: (Greece) A. Dimitropoulos; Man of the Match: (Greece) Nikos Kaltsas

3 December 2014 6^{1}	Atromitos	0 – 0	Veria	Athens
17:15 (UTC+2)	Pitu Garcia (yellow card) 83'	Report	Amarantidis (yellow card) 52'; Vázquez (yellow card) 57'; Esparza (yellow card) 59'; Ostojić (yellow card) 83'; Vukić (yellow card) 83'	Stadium: Peristeri Stadium; Attendance: 833; Referee: (Greece) A. Papapetrou; Man of the Match: (Greece) Kenan Bargan

19 October 2014 7	Veria	2 – 1	Levadiakos	Veria
18:15 (UTC+3)	Battión 22'; Dumitru 25'; Balafas (yellow card) 32'	Report	Sotelo 26'; Sánchez (yellow card) 34'; Koné (yellow card) 41'; Zito (yellow card) 71'	Stadium: Veria Stadium; Attendance: 984; Referee: (Greece) A. Aretopoulos; Man of the Match: (Greece) Georgios Kantimiris

26 October 2014 8	PAOK	4 – 1	Veria	Thessaloniki
17:15(UTC+3)	Mak 25'; Salpingidis 42'; Kaçe 57'; Theofanis Tzandaris (yellow card) 60'; Athanasiadis 79'	Report	Amarantidis (yellow card) 69'; Ben Nabouhane 83'	Stadium: Toumba Stadium; Attendance: 9,116; Referee: (Greece) A. Pappas; Man of the Match: (Greece) Dimitris Salpingidis

1 November 2014 9	Veria	2 – 2	Panionios	Veria
17:15 (UTC+2)	Cámpora 38'; Vertzos (yellow card) 43'; Bravo 45'; Amarantidis (yellow card) 61'	Report	Giannou 20', 53'; Tasoulis (yellow card) 64'; Boumale (yellow card) 78'; Siopis (yellow card) 83'	Stadium: Veria Stadium; Attendance: 1,087; Referee: (Greece) A. Koutsiaftis; Man of the Match: (Greece) Apostolos Giannou

8 November 2014 10	Ergotelis	2 – 2	Veria	Heraklion
15:00 (UTC+2)	Chalkiadakis 13'; Youssouf 38'; Chanti (yellow card) 49'; Lykogiannis (yellow card) 60' Tzanakakis (yellow card) 70'	Report	Kaltsas 17' Amarantidis (yellow card) 32'; Ben 61'; Bargan (yellow card) 64'	Stadium: Pankritio Stadium; Attendance: 1,068; Referee: (Greece) G. Liachoudis; Man of the Match: (Greece) Bruno Chalkiadakis

10 January 2015 11^{2}	Veria	1 – 1	AEL Kalloni	Veria
15:00 (UTC+2)	Kaltsas 8'; Battión (yellow card) 18'; Vertzos (yellow card) 90'	Report	Juanma 16'; Kaltsas (yellow card) 23'	Stadium: Veria Stadium; Attendance: 777; Referee: (Greece) P. Zachariadis; Man of the Match: (Malta) Andrew Hogg

30 November 2014 12	Panathinaikos	2 – 1	Veria	Athens
19:30 (UTC+2)	Bouy (yellow card) 24'; Pranjić (pen.), 26'; Berg 47'; Zeca (yellow card) 59'	Report	Malón (red card) 25'; Bravo (yellow card) 59'; Kaltsas 68'; Bargan (yellow card) 78'	Stadium: Leoforos Alexandras Stadium; Attendance: 7,009; Referee: (Greece) G. Kizas; Man of the Match: (Sweden) Marcus Berg

6 December 2014 13	Veria	2 – 0	Platanias	Veria
15:00 (UTC+2)	Balafas 9'; Vertzos (yellow card) 40'; Cámpora 60'	Report	Tetteh (yellow card) 59'; Giannis Zaradoukas (yellow card) 72'	Stadium: Veria Stadium; Attendance: 927; Referee: (Greece) M. Koukoulakis; Man of the Match: (Greece) Georgios Kantimiris

14 December 2014 14	Asteras Tripolis	2 – 0	Veria	Tripoli
17:15 (UTC+2)	Mazza 35'; Barrales 38'; Lluy (yellow card) 72'	Report	Bravo (yellow card) 41'; Kaltsas (yellow card) 53'; Vertzos (yellow card) 77'; Kali (yellow card) 88'	Stadium: Theodoros Kolokotronis Stadium; Attendance: 1,383; Referee: (Greece) A. Giachos; Man of the Match: (Argentina) Pablo Mazza

17 December 2014 15	Veria	2 – 0	Niki Volos	Veria
17:15 (UTC+2)	Cámpora 38'; Kaltsas 84'	Report	Karassalidis (yellow card) 75'	Stadium: Veria Stadium; Attendance: 663; Referee: (Greece) A. Pappas; Man of the Match: (Greece) Nikos Kaltsas

20 December 2014 16	Panthrakikos	1 – 1	Veria	Komotini
15:00 (UTC+2)	Tzanis 10'; Christou (yellow card) 81'; Pérez (yellow card) 86'; Papageorgiou (yellow card) 90+3'	Report	Kali (yellow card) 31'; Kaltsas (yellow card) 53', (goal) 89'; Bravo (red card) 80'	Stadium: Komotini Municipal Stadium; Attendance: 1,398; Referee: (Greece) K. Ioannidis; Man of the Match: (Greece) Nikos Kaltsas

3 January 2015 17	Veria	1 – 3	Panetolikos	Veria
15:00 (UTC+2)	Kaltsas 88'	Report	Godoy (yellow card) 15'; Kappel 27'; Edjenguélé (yellow card) 39'; Kousas (yellow card) 44'; Villafáñez 54', 63'	Stadium: Veria Stadium; Attendance: 1,094; Referee: (Greece) G. Daskalopoulos; Man of the Match: (Argentina) Lucas Villafáñez

14 January 2015 18	Skoda Xanthi	2 – 2	Veria	Xanthi
17:15 (UTC+2)	Baxevanidis (yellow card) 8' (yellow-red card) 30' Kapetanos 38'; Goutas (yellow card) 29', (goal) 56'; Beljić (yellow card) 87'	Report	Amarantidis (yellow card) 26'; Ben 35'; Kaltsas 60' pMalón (yellow card) 69'	Stadium: Skoda Xanthi Arena; Attendance: 1,064; Referee: (Greece) D. Thanos; Man of the Match: (Greece) Kenan Bargan

17 January 2015 19	Veria	4 – 1	OFI	Veria
15:00 (UTC+2)	Ben (pen.), 18', 59'; Pavlidis 38'; Kaltsas 39'; Bargan (yellow card) 61'; Vertzos (yellow card) 67'	Report	Tripotseris (red card) 30'; Makris 37'	Stadium: Veria Stadium; Attendance: 856; Referee: (Greece) A. Amparkiolis; Man of the Match: (Comoros) El Fardou Ben Nabouhane

24 January 2015 20	Kerkyra	4 – 0	Veria	Corfu
17:15 (UTC+2)	Markovski 5', 17', (yellow card) 66'; Vergonis , 22' (o.g.); Siontis (yellow card) 80'; Kontos 85'	Report	Amarantidis (yellow card) 64'	Stadium: Kerkyra Stadium; Attendance: 608; Referee: (Greece) M. Koukoulakis; Man of the Match: (Serbia) Marko Markovski

1 February 2015 21	Veria	0 – 2	Olympiacos	Veria
19:30 (UTC+2)	Balafas (yellow card) 11' (red card); Dumitru (yellow card) 21'; Battión (yellow card) 76' (yellow-red card); Ostojić (yellow card) 82'; Bargan (yellow card) 90'	Report	Mitroglou 71', (yellow card) 72'; Siovas (yellow card) 82'; Dossevi 87'; Kasami (yellow card) 88'	Stadium: Veria Stadium; Attendance: TBA; Referee: (Greece) K. Ioannidis; Man of the Match: (Greece) Kostas Mitroglou

4 February 2015 22	PAS Giannina	4 – 1	Veria	Ioannina
17:15 (UTC+2)				Stadium: Zosimades Stadium; Referee: (Greece) A. Aretopoulos

7 February 2015 23	Veria	1 – 1	Atromitos	Veria
19:30 (UTC+2)				Stadium: Veria Stadium

15 February 2015 24	Levadiakos	0 – 2	Veria	Livadeia
17:15 (UTC+2)				Stadium: Levadia Municipal Stadium

21 February 2015 25	Veria	1 – 3	PAOK	Veria
19:30 (UTC+2)	Dumitru 61'	Report	Pereyra 10'; Noboa 28'; Vítor 42'	Stadium: Veria Stadium; Attendance: 1,567; Referee: (Greece) A. Koutsiaftis; Man of the Match: (Argentina) Facundo Pereyra

1 March 2015 26	Panionios	4 – 2	Veria	Athens
17:15 (UTC+2)		Report		Stadium: Nea Smyrni Stadium; Attendance: 350

7 March 2015 27	Veria	0 – 1	Ergotelis	Veria
15:00 (UTC+2)		Report		Stadium: Veria Stadium; Attendance: Suspended

16 March 2015 28	AEL Kalloni	4 – 1	Veria	Mytilene
19:30 (UTC+2)		Report		Stadium: Mytilene Municipal Stadium; Attendance: Suspended

22 March 2015 29	Veria	1 – 0	Panathinaikos	Veria
19:30 (UTC+2)	Ben 36'; Amarantidis (yellow card) 66'; Kantimiris (yellow card) 90+4'	Report		Stadium: Veria Stadium; Attendance: 1,582; Referee: (Greece) A. Aretopoulos; Man of the Match: (Comoros) El Fardou Ben Nabouhane

4 April 2015 30	Platanias	1 – 0	Veria	Chania
17:15 (UTC+2)		Report		Stadium: Perivolia Municipal Stadium; Attendance: 1,758

20 April 2015 31	Veria	4 – 0	Asteras Tripolis	Veria
19:30 (UTC+2)		Report		Stadium: Veria Stadium; Attendance: 1,058; Man of the Match: (Comoros) El Fardou Ben Nabouhane

26 April 2015 32	Niki Volos	0 – 3	Veria	Volos
17:15 (UTC+2)	-	Niki Volos left the championship.	-	Stadium: Panthessaliko Stadium; Attendance: - Referee: - Man of the Match: -

3 May 2015 33	Veria	0 – 1	Panthrakikos	Veria
19:00 (UTC+2)		Report		Stadium: Veria Stadium; Attendance: 952

10 May 2015 34	Panetolikos	2 – 0	Veria	Agrinio
19:00 (UTC+2)		Report		Stadium: Panetolikos Stadium; Attendance: 2,406

1.Matchday 6 was suspended after the decision of the Deputy Minister of Culture and Sport, Giannis Andrianos, in memory of Kostas Katsoulis, that was killed in the riots during the match between Irodotos and Ethnikos Piraeus on 14 September 2014 for the Football League 2. See Football hooliganism#Greece for more information.
2.Matchday 11 was suspended after the decision of the Hellenic Football Federation president, Giorgos Sarris, not to put referees in matches, because of the attack that had been made against referee Christoforos Zografos.

Last updated: 12 May 2015
Source: Superleague Greece

== League table ==
Pos	Team	Pld	W	D	L	GF	GA	GD	Pts	Qualification or relegation
11	Panthrakikos	34	11	10	13	35	44	−9	43 (Note: Head-to-head points: Panthrakikos 11, Panionios 10, Veria 8, Levadiakos 4.)	
12	Panionios	34	11	10	13	43	42	+1	43	
13	Veria	34	12	7	15	45	54	−9	43	
14	Levadiakos	34	12	7	15	41	34	+7	43	
15	Ergotelis (R)	34	8	8	18	35	60	−25	32	Relegation to Football League

Source: Super League Greece
Rules for classification: 1) Points; 2) Head-to-head goal difference; 3) Head-to-head points; 4) Goals scored; 5) Play-offs (neutral ground).
(Note: Criteria 5 is only used if needed to decide champion, teams for relegation or teams for UEFA competitions). In any other case, the final standings of tied teams are determined with a public draw.
(R) Relegated

=== Results summary ===
Overall								Home						Away					
Pld	W	D	L	GF	GA	GD	Pts	W	D	L	GF	GA	GD	W	D	L	GF	GA	GD
34	12	7	15	34	36	−2	43	9	3	5	22	15	+7	3	4	10	12	21	−9

Last updated: 12 May 2015.
Source: Superleague Greece

=== Results by matchday ===
Round	1	2	3	4	5	6	7	8	9	10	11	12	13	14	15	16	17	18	19	20	21	22	23	24	25	26	27	28	29	30	31	32	33	34
Ground	H	A	H	A	H	A	H	A	H	A	H	A	H	A	H	A	H	A	H	A	H	A	H	A	H	A	H	A	H	A	H	A	H	A
Result	W	W	W	L	W	D	W	L	D	D	D	L	W	L	W	D	L	D	W	L	L	L	D	W	L	L	L	L	W	L	W	W	L	L
Position	1	1	1	3	2	6	2	3	3	4	6	7	5	5	5	5	6	6	6	6	9	9	9	7	8	8	8	8	10	9	9	9	9	14

Source: Superleague Greece
A = Away; H = Home; W = Win; D = Draw; L = Loss

== Greek Cup ==
=== Second round ===
Pos	Team	Pld	W	D	L	GF	GA	GD	Pts	Qualification	VER	APS	ERM	ERG
1	Veria	3	2	1	0	7	2	+5	7	Round of 16		1–1	4–1	—
2	Apollon Smyrnis	3	1	2	0	4	3	+1	5	Round of 16	—		—	2–2
3	Ermionida	3	1	0	2	3	5	−2	3		—	0–1		2–0
4	Ergotelis	3	0	1	2	2	6	−4	1		0–2	—	—	

Source: epo.gr

Win Draw Loss Postponed

24 September 2014 1	Veria	4 – 1	Ermionida	Veria
16:30 (UTC+3)	Dumitru 16', 28'; Cámpora 69'; Giorgos Georgiadis 76'; Bargan (yellow card) 90+2'	Report	Symelidis (yellow card) 62'; Vlachopoulos 72'	Stadium: Veria Stadium; Attendance: 1,000; Referee: (Greece) E. Kiotzenis; Man of the Match: (Italy) Nicolao Dumitru

29 October 2014 2	Ergotelis	0 – 2	Veria	Heraklion
15:00 (UTC+2)		Report	Vergonis 10'; Bargan 64'	Stadium: Pankritio Stadium; Attendance: 500; Referee: (Greece) K. Ioannidis; Man of the Match: (Greece) Kenan Bargan

7 January 2015 3	Veria	1 – 1	Apollon Smyrnis	Veria
15:00 (UTC+2)	Pavlidis (yellow card) 24'; Hasselbaink 79'	Report	Alípio 22'	Stadium: Veria Stadium; Attendance: 1,000; Referee: (Greece) G. Ntitsos; Man of the Match: (Netherlands) Nigel Hasselbaink

=== Third round ===
==== First leg ====
20 January 2015 Third round	Panionios	2 – 1	Veria	Athens
19:30 (UTC+2)	Cámpora 2'	Report	Ikonomou 62'; Kolovos 71'	Stadium: Nea Smyrni Stadium; Attendance: 2,000; Referee: (Greece) P. Zachariadis; Man of the Match: (Greece) Dimitris Kolovos

==== Second leg ====
28 January 2015 Third round	Veria	1 – 1	Panionios	Veria
15:00 (UTC+2)	Kaltas 85'	Report	Masouras 80'	Stadium: Veria Stadium; Attendance: 1,000; Referee: (Greece) S. Mantalos; Man of the Match: (Cameroon) Olivier Boumale

== Players statistics ==
=== Overall ===
As of 2 February 2015

Numbers in parentheses denote appearances as substitute. Players with number struck through and marked † left the club during the playing season.

No.	Pos.	Name	Super League Greece		Greek Cup		Total	
No.	Pos.	Name	Apps	Goals	Apps	Goals	Apps	Goals
1	GK	(Greece) Georgios Kantimiris	21	0	0	0	21	0
2	DF	(Spain) Raúl Bravo	17	1	2	0	19	1
3	DF	(France) Cyril Kali	11	0	2	0	13	0
4	DF	(Spain) José Catalá	1 (2)	0	2 (1)	0	3 (3)	0
5	DF	(Greece) Angelos Vertzos	16	0	3	0	19	0
6	MF	(Argentina) Roberto Battión	16 (1)	1	0 (1)	0	16 (2)	1
7	MF	(Greece) Nikos Kaltsas (c)	20 (1)	10	0 (2)	0	20 (3)	10
8	MF	(Serbia) Branko Ostojić (c)	7 (4)	0	5	0	12 (4)	0
9	FW	(Argentina) Javier Cámpora	14 (5)	5	2 (2)	2	16 (6)	7
11	FW	(Greece) Kenan Bargan	8 (10)	0	3	1	11 (10)	1
12	FW	(Italy) Nicolao Dumitru	14 (2)	3	3	2	17 (2)	5
13	FW	(Greece) Thomas Nazlidis	0 (1)	0	0	0	0 (1)	0
14	MF	(Spain) David Vázquez	9 (3)	0	1 (1)	0	10 (4)	0
15	MF	(Mexico) Pedro Arce	0 (3)	0	2	0	2 (3)	0
16	DF	(Brazil) Neto	0	0	0	0	0	0
18	DF	(Spain) Iván Malón	15	0	2	0	17	0
19	MF	(Cameroon) Cédric Mandjeck	1 (1)	0	1 (1)	0	2 (2)	0
21	MF	(Greece) Alexandros Vergonis (c)	10 (3)	1	3 (1)	1	13 (4)	2
22	GK	(Spain) Xavi Ginard	0	0	5	0	5	0
23	DF	(Greece) Dimitris Amarantidis	15	0	1 (1)	0	16 (1)	0
24	MF	(Spain) Jokin Esparza	1 (2)	0	3 (1)	0	5 (2)	0
25	MF	(Greece) Sotiris Balafas	8 (1)	1	3	0	11 (1)	1
29	MF	(Greece) Andreas Tatos	0	0	0	0	0	0
30	MF	(Spain) Carlos Caballero	0	0	0	0	0	0
31	FW	(Comoros) Ben Mohamed	14 (4)	6	2	0	16 (4)	6
32	MF	(Greece) Charalampos Pavlidis	6 (1)	1	3 (1)	0	9 (2)	1
55	DF	(Greece) Stelios Marangos	0	0	0	0	0	0
71	GK	(Greece) Dimitris Chomsioglou	0	0	0	0	0	0
77	MF	(Greece) Giorgos Georgiadis	5 (6)	0	3	1	8 (6)	1
92	FW	(Australia) Theo Markelis	0	0	0	0	0	0
--	FW	(Serbia) Zvonimir Vukić*	0 (2)	0	0	0	0 (2)	0
--	DF	(Greece) Vangelis Tsiamis*	1	0	1	0	2	0
--	MF	(Greece) Kostas Panagiotoudis*	0	0	0	0	0	0
--	MF	(Greece) Giorgos Katidis*	1 (3)	0	2	0	3 (3)	0
--	FW	(Netherlands) Nigel Hasselbaink*	0 (1)	0	1 (1)	1	1 (2)	1

Source: Superleague Greece
Note: (*) Indicates that player left the club before season finale.

=== Goals ===
R	Player	Position	Super League	Greek Cup	Total	Notes
1	(Greece) Nikos Kaltsas	MF	12	1	13	
2	(Comoros) Ben Nabouhane	CF	10	0	10	
3	(Italy) Nicolao Dumitru	CF	6	2	8	
4	(Argentina) Javier Cámpora	CF	5	2	7	
5	(Greece) Alexandros Vergonis	MF	2	1	3	
6	(Greece) Kenan Bargan	MF	1	1	2	
7	(Argentina) Roberto Battión	MF	1	0	1	2 assist(s)
7	(Spain) Raúl Bravo	DF	1	0	1	1 assist(s)
7	(Greece) Sotiris Balafas	MF	1	0	1	0 assist(s)
7	(Spain) Carlos Caballero Pérez	MF	1	0	1	0 assist(s)
8	(Greece) Giorgos Georgiadis	MF	0	1	1	1 assist(s)

Last updated: 12 May 2015
(*) Left the club before season finale
Source: Match reports in Competitive matches
0 shown as blank

=== Assists ===
R	Player	Position	Super League	Greek Cup	Total	Notes
1	(Comoros) Ben Nabouhane	CF	9	0	9	
2	(Greece) Nikos Kaltsas	RW	7	0	7	
3	(Argentina) Javier Cámpora	CF	3	1	4	
4	(Italy) Nicolao Dumitru	CF	3	0	3	
5	(Argentina) Roberto Battión	MF	2	0	2	
5	(Greece) Kenan Bargan	RW	1	1	2	
5	(Spain) Raúl Bravo	LB	0	1	1	
5	(Greece) Giorgos Katidis*	MF	0	1	1	

Last updated: 12 May 2015
Note: (*) Left the club before season finale.
Source: Match reports in Competitive matches
0 shown as blank

=== Disciplinary record ===
Number	Nationality	Position	Name	Super League		Greek Cup		Total	
Number	Nationality	Position	Name	Yellow card	Red card	Yellow card	Red card	Yellow card	Red card
23	(Greece)	DF	Dimitris Amarantidis	10	0	0	0	10	0
5	(Greece)	DF	Angelos Vertzos	9	0	0	0	9	0
2	(Spain)	DF	Raúl Bravo	7	1	0	0	7	1
7	(Greece)	MF	Nikos Kaltsas	7	0	0	0	7	0
14	(Spain)	MF	David Vázquez	6	0	0	0	6	0
3	(France)	DF	Cyril Kali	5	0	0	0	5	0
11	(Greece)	MF	Kenan Bargan	4	0	1	0	5	0
6	(Argentina)	MF	Roberto Battión	4	1	0	0	4	1
25	(Greece)	MF	Sotiris Balafas	4	1	0	0	4	1
1	(Greece)	GK	Georgios Kantimiris	3	0	0	0	3	0
55	(Greece)	DF	Stelios Marangos	3	0	0	0	3	0
8	(Serbia)	MF	Branko Ostojić	3	0	0	0	3	0
9	(Argentina)	FW	Javier Cámpora	2	0	0	0	2	0
77	(Greece)	MF	Giorgos Georgiadis	2	0	0	0	2	0
16	(Brazil)	DF	Neto	2	0	0	0	2	0
18	(Spain)	DF	Iván Malón	2	1	0	0	2	1
4	(Spain)	DF	José Catalá*	1	0	1	0	2	0
30	(Spain)	MF	Carlos Caballero Pérez	1	0	0	0	1	0
29	(Greece)	MF	Andreas Tatos	1	0	0	0	1	0
31	(Comoros)	FW	Ben	1	0	0	0	1	0
12	(Italy)	FW	Nicolao Dumitru	1	0	0	0	1	0
24	(Spain)	MF	Jokin Esparza	1	0	0	0	1	0
22	(Spain)	GK	Xavi Ginard	1	0	0	0	1	0
			Total	84	4	1	0	85	4

Note: (*) Left the club before season finale.
Last updated: 12 May 2015
Competitive matches only
* indicates a second yellow card ( (yellow card) (yellow-red card) )
Source: Superleague Greece

=== Best Goal and MVP awards and nominees ===
Day	Opponent	H / A	Name	for	Status
1	Skoda Xanthi	H	(Italy) Nicolao Dumitru	Best Goal	Nominated
3	Kerkyra	H	(Italy) Nicolao Dumitru	Best Goal	Won
9	Panionios	H	(Argentina) Javier Cámpora	Best Goal	Won
10	Ergotelis	A	(Greece) Nikos Kaltsas	Best Goal	Nominated
11	AEL Kalloni	H	(Greece) Nikos Kaltsas	Best Goal	Won
13	Platanias	H	(Greece) Georgios Kantimiris	MVP	Won
17	Panetolikos	H	(Greece) Nikos Kaltsas	Best Goal	Won
19	OFI	H	(Comoros) Ben Nabouhane	MVP	Won
31	Asteras Tripolis	H	(Comoros) Ben Nabouhane	MVP	Won

Source: Best of Superleague 2014–2015

== Infrastructure leagues ==
=== U20 ===
Win Draw Loss Postponed

Date	Opponents	H / A	Result
30 August 2014	OFI Crete	A	1-2
6 September 2014	Skoda Xanthi	H	1-2
13 September 2014	Kerkyra	H	6-1
21 September 2014	Olympiacos	A	3-1
28 September 2014	PAS Giannina	H	1-0
18 October 2014	Levadiakos	H	4-0
25 October 2014	PAOK	A	1-0
1 November 2014	Panionios	H	1-3
8 November 2014	Ergotelis	A	0-1
TBA	AEL Kalloni	H	Postponed
29 November 2014	Panathinaikos	A	3-0
6 December 2014	Platanias	H	6-3
14 December 2014	Asteras Tripolis	A	3-0
ΤΒΑ	Niki Volos	H	Postponed
20 December 2014	Panthrakikos	A	1-2

Pos	Club	Pld	Pts
4	Panionios	34	68
5	Veria	34	62
6	Skoda Xanthi	34	59

Pos = Position; Pld = Matches played; Pts = Points
Source: Superleague U20

=== U17 ===
Date	Opponents	H / A	Result
14 September 2014	Niki Volos	A	2–1
21 September 2014	Panetolikos	H	1–1
27 September 2014	PAS Giannina	A	1–0
15 November 2014	SKODA Xanthi	H	0–0
11 October 2014	Panthrakikos	A	1–1
19 October 2014	PAOK	H	0–5
25 October 2014	Kerkyra	A	1–0
1 November 2014	Niki Volos	H	3–2
9 November 2014	Panetolikos	A	3–2
TBA	PAS Giannina	H	Postponed
29 November 2014	SKODA Xanthi	A	2–0
7 December 2014	Panthrakikos	H	0–1
13 December 2014	P.A.O.K.	A	2–1
21 December 2014	Kerkyra	A	11:00

Pos	Club	Pld	Pts
5	Panthrakikos	28	43
6	Veria	28	29
7	Kerkyra	28	20

Pos = Position; Pld = Matches played; Pts = Points
Source: Superleague U17

=== U15 ===
Win Draw Loss Postponed

Date	Opponents	H / A	Result F – A
12 October 2014	PAOK	H	2–8
18 October 2014	Niki Volos	A	0–1
25 October 2014	Panthrakikos	A	2–3
1 November 2014	PAS Giannina	H	1–1
9 November 2014	Kerkyra	A	1–0
15 November 2014	Panetolikos	H	1–1
TBA	Panetolikos	A	Postponed
29 November 2014	P.A.O.K.	A	5–0
6 December 2014	Niki Volos	H	1–2
13 December 2014	Panthrakikos	H	0–4
21 December 2014	PAS Giannina	A	12:30

Pos	Club	Pld	Pts
5	Panthrakikos	21	20
6	Veria	21	20
7	Kerkyra	21	16

Pos = Position; Pld = Matches played; Pts = Points
Source: Superleague U15
