= List of Greek football transfers summer 2015 =

This is a list of Greek football transfers in the summer transfer window 2015 by club. Only transfers of the Super League are included.

== AEK Athens ==
In: Note: Flags indicate national team as defined under FIFA eligibility rules; some limited exceptions apply. Players may hold more than one non-FIFA nationality.

No.	Pos.	Nation	Player
—	MF	POR	André Simões (from (Portugal) Moreirense)
—	MF	BRA	Rodrigo Galo (from (Portugal) Paços de Ferreira)
—	DF	GRE	Nikolaos Argyriou (loan return from (Greece) Episkopi)
—	FW	GRE	Vasilis Tsevas (loan return from (Greece) Iraklis Psachna)
—	DF	COD	Christopher Duberet (loan return from (Greece) Triglia Rafinas)
—	MF	GRE	Orestis Paliaroutas (loan return from (Greece) A.E. Kifisia)
—	MF	SRB	Nikola Živanović (loan return from (Greece) Anagennisi Ierapetras)
—	MF	GRE	Lambros Thanailakis (loan return from (Greece) Ilisiakos)
—	DF	GRE	Stavros Vasilantonopoulos (from (Greece) Apollon Smyrnis)
—	FW	ALG	Rafik Djebbour (from (Cyprus) APOEL)
—	MF	ESP	César Arzo (from (Israel) Beitar Jerusalem)
—	FW	VEN	Ronald Vargas (from (Turkey) Balıkesirspor)
—	MF	GRE	Kyriakos Andreopoulos (from (Greece) Kerkyra)
—	GK	VEN	Alain Baroja (on loan from (Venezuela) Caracas)
—	DF	ESP	Dídac Vilà (from (Italy) AC Milan)

Out: Note: Flags indicate national team as defined under FIFA eligibility rules; some limited exceptions apply. Players may hold more than one non-FIFA nationality.

No.	Pos.	Nation	Player
—	DF	GRE	Nikolaos Argyriou (to (Greece) Episkopi)
—	FW	GRE	Vasilis Tsevas (to (Greece) Iraklis Psachna)
—	DF	COD	Christopher Duberet (to (Greece) Triglia Rafinas)
—	MF	GRE	Orestis Paliaroutas (to (Greece) A.E. Kifisia)
—	MF	SRB	Nikola Živanović (to (Greece) Anagennisi Ierapetras)
—	FW	GRE	Lambros Thanailakis (to (Greece) Ilisiakos)
—	DF	GRE	Nikolaos Georgeas (retired)
—	FW	BRA	D'Acol (released)

== AEL Kalloni ==
In: Note: Flags indicate national team as defined under FIFA eligibility rules; some limited exceptions apply. Players may hold more than one non-FIFA nationality.

No.	Pos.	Nation	Player

Out: Note: Flags indicate national team as defined under FIFA eligibility rules; some limited exceptions apply. Players may hold more than one non-FIFA nationality.

No.	Pos.	Nation	Player
39	FW	AUS	Sakis Theodoropoulos (to (Greece) Skoda Xanthi)

== Asteras Tripolis ==
In: Note: Flags indicate national team as defined under FIFA eligibility rules; some limited exceptions apply. Players may hold more than one non-FIFA nationality.

No.	Pos.	Nation	Player

Out: Note: Flags indicate national team as defined under FIFA eligibility rules; some limited exceptions apply. Players may hold more than one non-FIFA nationality.

No.	Pos.	Nation	Player
—	FW	ARG	Jerónimo Barrales (to (Turkey) Sivasspor)

== Atromitos ==
In: Note: Flags indicate national team as defined under FIFA eligibility rules; some limited exceptions apply. Players may hold more than one non-FIFA nationality.

No.	Pos.	Nation	Player

Out: Note: Flags indicate national team as defined under FIFA eligibility rules; some limited exceptions apply. Players may hold more than one non-FIFA nationality.

No.	Pos.	Nation	Player

== Iraklis ==
In: Note: Flags indicate national team as defined under FIFA eligibility rules; some limited exceptions apply. Players may hold more than one non-FIFA nationality.

No.	Pos.	Nation	Player
15	MF	ROU	Costin Lazăr (from (Greece) Panetolikos)
21	MF	GRE	Angelos Chanti (from (Greece) Ergotelis)
99	FW	TUR	Kerem Bulut (from (Australia) Western Sydney Wanderers)
23	DF	POR	Carlitos (from (Cyprus) AEL Limassol)
39	FW	GRE	Apostolos Vellios (from (Belgium) Lierse)
30	GK	SVK	Dušan Perniš (from (Slovakia) Slovan Bratislava)
54	MF	GRE	Georgios Makris (from (Greece) OFI)

Out: Note: Flags indicate national team as defined under FIFA eligibility rules; some limited exceptions apply. Players may hold more than one non-FIFA nationality.

No.	Pos.	Nation	Player
—	MF	GRE	Dimitris Toskas (released)
—	DF	GRE	Konstantinos Rougalas (to (Belgium) OH Leuven)
—	MF	GRE	Savvas Siatravanis (released)
—	MF	GRE	Giorgos Smiltos (released)
—	MF	GRE	Miltos Stefanidis (released)
—	MF	GRE	Anestis Karakostas (to (Greece) Veria)
—	FW	GRE	Nikos Aggeloudis (released)

== Levadiakos ==
In: Note: Flags indicate national team as defined under FIFA eligibility rules; some limited exceptions apply. Players may hold more than one non-FIFA nationality.

No.	Pos.	Nation	Player

Out: Note: Flags indicate national team as defined under FIFA eligibility rules; some limited exceptions apply. Players may hold more than one non-FIFA nationality.

No.	Pos.	Nation	Player

== Olympiacos ==
In: Note: Flags indicate national team as defined under FIFA eligibility rules; some limited exceptions apply. Players may hold more than one non-FIFA nationality.

No.	Pos.	Nation	Player
—	FW	FRA	El Fardou Ben Nabouhane (from (Greece) Veria)
—	GK	GEO	Giorgi Loria (from (Greece) OFI)
—	MF	GRE	Bruno Chalkiadakis ( (Greece) Ergotelis)
—	FW	MEX	Alan Pulido (from (Greece) Levadiakos)
—	GK	GRE	Stefanos Kapino (from (Germany) Mainz 05)
—	MF	GRE	Theofanis Tzandaris (from (Greece) PAOK)
—	FW	ISL	Alfreð Finnbogason (on loan from (Spain) Real Sociedad)
—	MF	COL	Felipe Pardo (from (Portugal) Braga)
—	DF	POR	Manuel da Costa (from (Turkey) Sivasspor)
—	FW	NGA	Brown Ideye (from (England) West Brom Albion)

Out: Note: Flags indicate national team as defined under FIFA eligibility rules; some limited exceptions apply. Players may hold more than one non-FIFA nationality.

No.	Pos.	Nation	Player
—	FW	GRE	Kostas Mitroglou (loan return to (England) Fulham)
—	FW	NED	Ibrahim Affelay (loan return to (Spain) Barcelona)

== Panathinaikos ==
In: Note: Flags indicate national team as defined under FIFA eligibility rules; some limited exceptions apply. Players may hold more than one non-FIFA nationality.

No.	Pos.	Nation	Player
—	FW	GRE	Nikos Kaltsas (from (Greece) Veria)

Out: Note: Flags indicate national team as defined under FIFA eligibility rules; some limited exceptions apply. Players may hold more than one non-FIFA nationality.

No.	Pos.	Nation	Player

== Panetolikos ==
In: Note: Flags indicate national team as defined under FIFA eligibility rules; some limited exceptions apply. Players may hold more than one non-FIFA nationality.

No.	Pos.	Nation	Player
—	GK	GRE	Dimitris Kyriakidis (from (Greece) Skoda Xanthi)
—	DF	GRE	Simos Roumpoulakos (loan return from (Greece) Panegialios)
—	DF	GRE	Dimitris Chantakias (loan return from (Greece) Fokikos)
—	MF	GRE	Tasos Zarkadas (loan return from (Greece) Fokikos)
—	MF	BOL	Danny Bejarano (from (Bolivia) Oriente Petrolero)
—	MF	GRE	Grigoris Makos (from (Cyprus) Anorthosis)
—	MF	BRA	Marcos Paulo (from (Portugal) Académica)
—	MF	ARG	Emiliano Romero (from (Argentina) Justicia)
—	MF	EGY	Amr Warda (from (Egypt) Ittihad)

Out: Note: Flags indicate national team as defined under FIFA eligibility rules; some limited exceptions apply. Players may hold more than one non-FIFA nationality.

No.	Pos.	Nation	Player
—	DF	GRE	Stelios Malezas (to (Greece) PAOK)

== Panionios ==
In: Note: Flags indicate national team as defined under FIFA eligibility rules; some limited exceptions apply. Players may hold more than one non-FIFA nationality.

No.	Pos.	Nation	Player

Out: Note: Flags indicate national team as defined under FIFA eligibility rules; some limited exceptions apply. Players may hold more than one non-FIFA nationality.

No.	Pos.	Nation	Player

== Panthrakikos ==
In: Note: Flags indicate national team as defined under FIFA eligibility rules; some limited exceptions apply. Players may hold more than one non-FIFA nationality.

No.	Pos.	Nation	Player

Out: Note: Flags indicate national team as defined under FIFA eligibility rules; some limited exceptions apply. Players may hold more than one non-FIFA nationality.

No.	Pos.	Nation	Player

== PAOK ==
In: Note: Flags indicate national team as defined under FIFA eligibility rules; some limited exceptions apply. Players may hold more than one non-FIFA nationality.

No.	Pos.	Nation	Player
—	GK	SWE	Robin Olsen (from (Sweden) Malmö FF)
—	DF	GRE	Stelios Malezas (from (Greece) Panetolikos)
—	MF	GRE	Nikos Korovesis (from (Greece) PAS Giannina)
—	MF	GRE	Charis Charisis (from (Greece) PAS Giannina)
—	MF	GRE	Dimitrios Pelkas (loan return from (Portugal) Vitória)
—	MF	POR	Garry Rodrigues (from (Spain) Elche)
—	MF	SVK	Erik Sabo (from (Slovakia) Spartak Trnava)
—	FW	BRA	Jairo (from (Slovakia) Trenčín)

Out: Note: Flags indicate national team as defined under FIFA eligibility rules; some limited exceptions apply. Players may hold more than one non-FIFA nationality.

No.	Pos.	Nation	Player

== PAS Giannina ==
In: Note: Flags indicate national team as defined under FIFA eligibility rules; some limited exceptions apply. Players may hold more than one non-FIFA nationality.

No.	Pos.	Nation	Player
—	GK	GRE	Kostas Peristeridis (from (Greece) Platanias)
—	GK	GRE	Nikolaos Koliofoukas (from Free agent)
—	DF	GRE	Nikos Karanikas (from (Greece) AEL)
—	MF	GRE	Chrysovalantis Kozoronis (from (Greece) Ergotelis)
—	FW	GRE	Dimitrios Ferfelis (from (Netherlands) Zwolle)

Out: Note: Flags indicate national team as defined under FIFA eligibility rules; some limited exceptions apply. Players may hold more than one non-FIFA nationality.

No.	Pos.	Nation	Player
—	MF	GRE	Charis Charisis (to (Greece) PAOK)
—	MF	GRE	Nikos Korovesis (to (Greece) PAOK)

== Platanias ==
In: Note: Flags indicate national team as defined under FIFA eligibility rules; some limited exceptions apply. Players may hold more than one non-FIFA nationality.

No.	Pos.	Nation	Player
—	FW	GRE	Konstantinos Pangalos (from (Greece) Chania)
—	DF	UKR	Yevhen Selin (on loan from (Ukraine) Dynamo Kyiv)
—	FW	ARG	Leonardo Javier Ramos (from (Chile) San Marcos)

Out: Note: Flags indicate national team as defined under FIFA eligibility rules; some limited exceptions apply. Players may hold more than one non-FIFA nationality.

No.	Pos.	Nation	Player

== Skoda Xanthi ==
In: Note: Flags indicate national team as defined under FIFA eligibility rules; some limited exceptions apply. Players may hold more than one non-FIFA nationality.

No.	Pos.	Nation	Player
35	GK	ITA	Luigi Cennamo (from (Greece) Atromitos)
33	DF	GRE	Giannis Zaradoukas (from (Greece) Platanias)
26	DF	SVK	Pavol Farkaš (from (Azerbaijan) Gabala)
25	MF	CRO	Tomislav Tomić (from (Bosnia and Herzegovina) Željezničar Sarajevo)
10	FW	BRA	Elton Figueiredo (from (Cyprus) Apollon Limassol)
87	MF	BUL	Nikolay Dimitrov (from (Turkey) Manisaspor)
20	MF	ROU	Ovidiu Herea (from (Switzerland) Sion)
14	MF	FRA	Sakis Theodoropoulos (on loan from (Greece) PAOK)

Out: Note: Flags indicate national team as defined under FIFA eligibility rules; some limited exceptions apply. Players may hold more than one non-FIFA nationality.

No.	Pos.	Nation	Player
12	DF	GRE	Anastasios Papazoglou (released)
20	MF	BRA	Silva Cleyton (to (Turkey) Elazığspor)

== Veria ==
In: Note: Flags indicate national team as defined under FIFA eligibility rules; some limited exceptions apply. Players may hold more than one non-FIFA nationality.

No.	Pos.	Nation	Player
—	MF	ALG	Djamel Abdoun (from (England) Nottingham Forest)
—	FW	BIH	Saša Kajkut (from (Greece) Kerkyra)
—	DF	BRA	Darcy Neto (returned to club after being released by it)
—	MF	COM	Mohamed Youssouf (from (Greece) Ergotelis)
—	GK	ESP	Jonathan López (from (Spain) Getafe)
—	DF	FRA	William Edjenguélé (from (Greece) Panetolikos)
—	MF	GEO	Giorgi Merebashvili (from (Greece) OFI)
—	DF	GRE	Nikos Tsoumanis (from (Greece) Panthrakikos)
—	DF	GRE	Vaggelis Nastos (from (Greece) Atromitos)
—	MF	GRE	Stefanos Siontis (from (Greece) Kerkyra)
—	MF	GRE	Marios Papadopoulos (loan return from (Greece) Aris)
—	MF	GRE	Anestis Karakostas (from (Greece) Iraklis)
—	MF	GRE	Giorgos Bouzoukis (from (Greece) Pierikos)
—	MF	GRE	Dimitris Giannoulis (on loan from (Greece) PAOK)
—	MF	NOR	Abdisalam Ibrahim (from (Greece) Olympiacos)
—	MF	POL	Radosław Majewski (from (England) Nottingham Forest)
—	FW	ZAM	Rodgers Kola (on loan from (Belgium) Gent)

Out: Note: Flags indicate national team as defined under FIFA eligibility rules; some limited exceptions apply. Players may hold more than one non-FIFA nationality.

No.	Pos.	Nation	Player
—	FW	ARG	Javier Cámpora (released)
—	FW	AUS	Theo Markelis (to (Australia) Hume City)
—	DF	BRA	Neto (released)
—	MF	CMR	Cédric Mandjeck (to (Spain) CF Pobla de Mafumet)
—	FW	COM	Ben (to (Greece) Olympiacos)
—	GK	ESP	Xavi Ginard (released)
—	DF	ESP	José Catalá (released)
—	DF	ESP	Raúl Bravo (released)
—	MF	ESP	Carlos Caballero (loan return to (Spain) Córdoba).
—	MF	ESP	Jokin Esparza (released)
—	MF	ESP	David Vázquez (released)
—	GK	GRE	Dimitris Chomsioglou (released)
—	DF	GRE	Dimitrios Amarantidis (released)
—	DF	GRE	Angelos Vertzos (to (Greece) AEL)
—	MF	GRE	Kenan Bargan (released)
—	MF	GRE	Nikos Kaltsas (to (Greece) Panathinaikos)
—	MF	GRE	Marios Papadopoulos (to (Greece) Aris)
—	MF	GRE	Giorgos Bouzoukis (on loan to (Greece) Chania)
—	FW	GRE	Dimitrios Manos (on loan to (Greece) Ergotelis)
—	FW	GRE	Stefanos Dogos (released)
—	FW	ITA	Nicolao Dumitru (loan return to (Italy) Napoli)
—	FW	PAN	Julio Segundo (released)

== See also ==
- 2015–16 Super League Greece
