= Mandjeck =

Mandjeck is a surname. Notable people with the surname include:

- Cédric Mandjeck (born 1993), Cameroonian footballer
- Georges Mandjeck (born 1988), Cameroonian footballer
