= Borja Sánchez (footballer, born 1987) =

Spanish footballer

Personal information
- Full name: Borja Sánchez Gil
- Date of birth: 14 February 1987 (age 39)
- Place of birth: Talavera de la Reina, Spain
- Height: 1.79 m (5 ft 10 1/2 in)
- Position: Midfielder

Team information
- Current team: Alcalá

Youth career
- 2001–2004: Atlético Madrid

Senior career*
Years	Team	Apps	(Gls)
2004–2006	Alcalá	26	(0)
2006–2007	Atlético Madrid B	2	(0)
2007–2008	Alcalá	30	(5)
2008–2009	Linense	32	(0)
2009–2010	Dénia	36	(4)
2010–2011	Girona	22	(0)
2011–2012	Ponferradina	31	(2)
2012–2013	Salamanca	35	(13)
2013–2014	Huesca	37	(5)
2014–2015	Kerkyra	4	(0)
2015–2016	Alcoyano	16	(1)
2016–2017	Fuenlabrada	24	(1)
2017–2018	Mirandés	38	(2)
2018	Logroñés	9	(0)
2019–2020	Burgos	46	(3)
2020–2023	S.S. Reyes	84	(1)
2024–	Alcalá	70	(11)
- * Club domestic league appearances and goals as of 7 May 2026

Borja Sánchez Gil (born 14 February 1987) is a Spanish footballer who plays for Alcalá as a midfielder.

He spent most of his career in the Segunda División B, playing 348 games across 14 seasons for 13 clubs. He also had brief professional spells at Girona and Greek team Kerkyra.

== Club career ==
Born in Talavera de la Reina, Province of Toledo, Sánchez began his career at RSD Alcalá, making his senior debut on 20 February 2005 as a late substitute in a 3–0 away loss against UD Lanzarote in the Segunda División B. The following campaign, he played more regularly as the team from the Community of Madrid were relegated.

Sánchez remained in the third division with Atlético Madrid B, playing just twice in 2006–07. In his first start, a 0–1 home defeat to Racing de Santander B on 17 September 2006, he received a straight red card before half-time in what would be his last appearance; after returning to Alcalá in Tercera División, he had one-season spells back in the third level with Real Balompédica Linense and CD Dénia, suffering relegation with the former.

On 28 June 2010, Sánchez signed a one-year deal at Girona FC with the option for a second. He made his debut for his new club on 1 September in a Copa del Rey second leg at the Estadi Montilivi, playing the entirety of a 1–1 draw against SD Huesca (5–3 penalty shootout loss); he was scoreless across the campaign in Segunda División, in which he started just twice.

Subsequently, Sánchez returned to division three, joining SD Ponferradina on 14 June 2011. He totalled 33 official games and two goals during his only season, helping to a return to the second tier after one year.

Sánchez remained in Castile and León and the third tier, signing for UD Salamanca on 7 August 2012. In a campaign which ended with administrative relegation, he scored a career-best 13 goals, including three braces in two victories over Sporting de Gijón B and another against CD Guijuelo.

Sánchez spent the next year at Huesca, who terminated his contract for financial reasons in June 2014. The following month, he moved abroad for the first time, signing at PAE Kerkyra.

On 6 July 2015, after only two starts and two substitute appearances as well as relegation from the Super League Greece, Sánchez returned to his homeland and its third division, joining CD Alcoyano.
