= José Catalá =

Spanish footballer (born 1985)

Personal information
- Full name: José Manuel Catalá Mazuecos
- Date of birth: 1 January 1985 (age 41)
- Place of birth: Villajoyosa, Spain
- Height: 1.82 m (6 ft 0 in)
- Position: Defender

Youth career
- Valencia

Senior career*
Years	Team	Apps	(Gls)
2004–2007	Valencia B	19	(0)
2004–2006	→ Villajoyosa (loan)	18	(0)
2007–2009	Alicante	43	(5)
2009–2010	Villarreal B	33	(1)
2010–2012	Villarreal	29	(1)
2012–2013	Murcia	22	(0)
2013–2014	Apollon Limassol	5	(0)
2014–2015	Veria	4	(0)
2015–2017	Racing Ferrol	44	(2)
2017–2018	Jumilla	30	(1)
2018–2019	Ejea	25	(1)
2019–2020	San Juan Mozarrifar	22	(1)
2021	Gerena	20	(0)
2022–2023	Dos Hermanas	12	(0)
Total		326	(12)
- * Club domestic league appearances and goals

José Manuel Catalá Mazuecos (born 1 January 1985) is a Spanish former professional footballer who played as a central defender or a left-back.

== Club career ==
Born in Villajoyosa, Province of Alicante, Valencian Community, Catalá emerged through local club Valencia CF's youth ranks, making his senior debut in the Segunda División B where he successively represented Villajoyosa CF, Valencia CF Mestalla and Alicante CF. In the 2007–08 season, he helped the latter to promote to Segunda División.

After suffering immediate relegation with Alicante, Catalá continued in that level with Villarreal CF's reserves. He was instrumental as they avoided relegation in their first-ever year in the competition, totalling 2,444 minutes and scoring once.

Catalá was promoted to the first team for the 2010–11 campaign, aged already 25. He managed to provide stiff competition to veteran Joan Capdevila, inclusively relegating the European and World Champion to the bench in some games. He finished his first year in La Liga with 30 competitive matches to his credit – 16 in the league, five in the Copa del Rey and nine in a semi-final run in the UEFA Europa League– opening the 2–0 home win against UD Almería on 3 January 2011 as the side eventually finished fourth and qualified for the UEFA Champions League.

After leaving the Yellow Submarine, Catalá totalled just 27 appearances in two seasons for Real Murcia CF and Apollon Limassol FC, the latter in the Cypriot First Division. On 8 August 2014, he changed teams and countries again, joining Veria F.C. of Super League Greece.

Catalá made his debut for his new team on 24 August 2014, coming on as a late substitute in a 3–2 home victory over Skoda Xanthi FC. His first start occurred against Ergotelis FC, his two mistakes resulting in both of the opposition's goals in an eventual 2–2 away draw. After failing to perform overall, player and club agreed to mutually terminate the contract on 26 May 2015.

In the following years, Catalá played in the Spanish third division.

== Career statistics ==
As of match played on 13 May 2018

Club	Season	League			Cup		Other		Total	
Club	Season	Division	Apps	Goals	Apps	Goals	Apps	Goals	Apps	Goals
Valencia B	2006–07	Segunda División B	19	0	—		—		19	0
Villajoyosa (loan)	2004–05	Segunda División B	5	0	—		—		5	0
Villajoyosa (loan)	2005–06	Segunda División B	13	0	2	0	—		15	0
Villajoyosa (loan)	Total		18	0	2	0	—		20	4
Alicante	2007–08	Segunda División B	15	2	5	0	4 (Note: Appearances in Segunda División B play-offs)	0	24	2
Alicante	2008–09	Segunda División	28	3	0	0	—		28	3
Alicante	Total		43	5	5	0	4	0	52	5
Villarreal	2009–10	La Liga	0	0	0	0	0	0	0	0
Villarreal	2010–11	La Liga	16	1	5	0	9 (Note: Appearances in UEFA Europa League)	0	30	1
Villarreal	2011–12	La Liga	13	0	0	0	4 (Note: Appearances in UEFA Champions League)	0	17	0
Villarreal	Total		29	1	5	0	13	0	47	1
Murcia	2012–13	Segunda División	22	0	0	0	—		22	0
Apollon Limassol	2013–14	Cypriot First Division	5	0	0	0	2	0	7	0
Veria	2014–15	Super League Greece	4	0	5	0	—		9	0
Racing Ferrol	2015–16	Segunda División B	14	0	1	0	2	0	17	0
Racing Ferrol	2016–17	Segunda División B	30	2	2	0	—		32	2
Racing Ferrol	Total		44	2	3	0	2	0	49	2
Jumilla	2017–18	Segunda División B	30	1	0	0	—		30	1
Career total			214	9	20	0	21	0	255	9
