= Nikolaos Bacharidis =

Greek footballer (born 1976)

Personal information
- Full name: Nikolaos Bacharidis
- Date of birth: 20 October 1976 (age 50)
- Place of birth: Neo Sidirochori, Komotini, Greece
- Height: 1.89 m (6 ft 2 1/2 in)
- Position: Defender

Senior career*
Years	Team	Apps	(Gls)
199?–1998	Panthrakikos		
1998–1999	PAE Thraki		
1999–2000	Agrotikos Asteras		
2000–2005	Panthrakikos		
2005–2010	Panthrakikos	99	(1)

Managerial career
- 2014: Panthrakikos (caretaker)
- 2017–2018: Doxa Proskinites
- 2018–2019: MA Iasmou
- 2019–2023: Panthrakikos
- 2024: Alexandroupoli
- 2025: Xanthi
- * Club domestic league appearances and goals as of 28 June 2010

Nikolaos Bacharidis (Greek: Νικόλαος Μπαχαρίδης; born 20 October 1976) is a Greek former footballer who played as a defender.

== Club career ==
Bacharidis is "flag" for the Panthrakikos F.C. He was captain for many years. He played nine years (2001–2010) in six levels, from the lowest regional league up to the Super League Greece. He retired after the 2009–2010 season's end.

Career statistics

season	club	league	Championship		Nation cup		Europe cup		Total	
season	club	league	appear	goals	appear	goals	appear	goals	appear	goals
2001–02	Panthrakikos	Regional B								
2002–03	Panthrakikos	Regional A								
2003–04	Panthrakikos	Delta Ethniki								
2004–05	Panthrakikos	Delta Ethniki								
2005–06	Panthrakikos	Gamma Ethniki	25	0	?	0	0	0	25	0
2006–07	Panthrakikos	Beta Ethniki	28	0	?	0	0	0	28	0
2007–08	Panthrakikos	Beta Ethniki	29	0	?	0	0	0	29	0
2008–09	Panthrakikos	Super League	5	1	0	0	0	0	5	1
2009–10	Panthrakikos	Super League	11	0	1	0	0	0	12	0
career total			98	0	0	0	0	0	99	1
