= David Vázquez (footballer, born 1986) =

Spanish footballer

Personal information
- Full name: David Vázquez Bardera
- Date of birth: 21 March 1986 (age 40)
- Place of birth: Madrid, Spain
- Height: 1.79 m (5 ft 10 in)
- Position: Midfielder

Youth career
- Real Madrid

Senior career*
Years	Team	Apps	(Gls)
2005–2007	Real Madrid C		
2007–2010	Real Madrid B	91	(7)
2010–2011	UD Melilla	30	(4)
2011–2013	Huesca	23	(2)
2013–2014	UD Melilla	44	(5)
2014–2015	Veria	17	(0)
2015–2017	UD Melilla	39	(4)
2019–2020	Melilla CD	14	(0)
- * Club domestic league appearances and goals

David Vázquez Bardera (born 21 March 1986) is a Spanish former footballer who played as a midfielder.

== Football career ==
Vázquez was born in Madrid. A local Real Madrid youth graduate, he made his professional debuts in 2007–08, playing for the reserves in the third division and going on to appear in a further two seasons with them in that level.

In mid-August 2010, Vázquez signed for another team in division three, UD Melilla. With his following club, SD Huesca, he made his professional debut in the second tier on 5 November 2011, playing the second half of a 1–2 away loss against UD Almería; he scored his first goal in the competition on 24 March of the following year, to help to a 1–1 home draw to Celta de Vigo.

On 28 May 2014, Vázquez moved abroad for the first time, signing for Veria F.C. in the Super League Greece. The following campaign, he returned to his country, its third division and Melilla.

== Club statistics ==
As of 18 March 2015

Club	Season	League			Cup		Other		Total	
Club	Season	Division	Apps	Goals	Apps	Goals	Apps	Goals	Apps	Goals
Real Madrid B	2006–07	Segunda División	0	0	—		—		0	0
Real Madrid B	2007–08	Segunda División B	27	1	—		—		27	1
Real Madrid B	2008–09	Segunda División B	36	3	—		—		36	3
Real Madrid B	2009–10	Segunda División B	28	3	—		—		28	3
Real Madrid B	Total		91	7	—		—		91	7
Melilla	2010–11	Segunda División B	28	4	2	1	2 (Note: Appearances in Promotion Play-offs)	0	32	5
Huesca	2011–12	Segunda División	20	2	0	0	—		20	2
Huesca	2012–13	Segunda División	3	0	1	0	—		4	2
Huesca	Total		23	2	1	0	—		24	5
Melilla	2012–13	Segunda División B	12	1	—		—		12	1
Melilla	2013–14	Segunda División B	32	4	—		—		32	4
Melilla	Total		44	5	—		—		44	5
Veria	2014–15	Super League Greece	17	0	2	0	—		19	0
Career total			203	18	5	1	2	0	210	19
