= Georgios Kantimiris =

Greek footballer

Personal information
- Full name: Georgios Kantimiris
- Date of birth: 19 September 1982 (age 44)
- Place of birth: Rhodes, Greece
- Height: 1.85 m (6 ft 1 in)
- Position: Goalkeeper

Youth career
- –2002: Ionikos

Senior career*
Years	Team	Apps	(Gls)
2002–2007	Ionikos	6	(0)
2004	→ Rodos (loan)	0	(0)
2007–2008	Rodos	0	(0)
2008–2009	Niki Volos	30	(0)
2009–2010	Fokikos	30	(0)
2010–2017	Veria	128	(0)
2017–2019	Aris	20	(0)
2023–2024	Veria NFC	8	(0)
- * Club domestic league appearances and goals as of 31 August 2024

Georgios Kantimiris (Greek: Γεώργιος Καντιμοίρης; born 19 September 1982) is a Greek former professional footballer who played as a goalkeeper.

== Career ==
In January 2008, Kantimiris who has played in Ionikos and Rodos, signed a year and 1/2 contract for Niki Volos stated:

I want to thank the administration of the club and the coach who gave me the opportunity to compete in a historical and great team. I am very pleased by this development and will do everything to achieve their teams' goals. I know, as all of Greece, for the dynamics of our fans. With their help our work would be easier and I believe that soon Niki Volos will surpass categories based on the 'weight' of the jersey and its fans.

On 26 July 2017 he joined Aris. On 5 July 2018 he renewed his contract for a further season.

== Honours ==
=== Veria ===
- Football League (Greece): 1
  - Runner-up: 2011–12

=== Individual ===
- 2013–14 MVP award(s): (1) Matchday 26
- 2014–15 MVP award(s): (1) Matchday 13
- Football League Goalkeeper of the Year: 2011–12 (Runner-up)
- NOVA Super League Awards 2014: Best team (Goalkeeper)
