= Vangelis Tsiamis =

Greek footballer

Personal information
- Full name: Evangelos Tsiamis
- Date of birth: 14 July 1991 (age 35)
- Place of birth: Veria, Greece
- Height: 1.88 m (6 ft 2 in)
- Position: Centre-back

Team information
- Current team: ASIL Lysi
- Number: 4

Senior career*
Years	Team	Apps	(Gls)
–2012	Makrochori	0	(0)
2012–2014	Anagennisi Giannitsa	39	(0)
2014–2015	Veria	1	(0)
2015	Acharnaikos	8	(0)
2016	Zakynthos	10	(0)
2016–2017	PAEEK	26	(0)
2017–2025	Omonia Aradippou	51	(1)
2024-25	ASIL Lysi (Loan)	24	(2)
2025-	ASIL Lysi	15	(2)
- * Club domestic league appearances and goals as of 3 May 2026

Vangelis Tsiamis (Greek: Βαγγέλης Τσιάμης; born 14 July 1991) is a Greek professional footballer who plays as a centre-back for Cypriot club ASIL Lysi.

== Career ==
Vangelis started his football career in Veria playing for Makrochori. In 2012, he signed his first professional contract with Anagennisi Giannitsa where he stayed for two seasons. On 15 July 2014 Vaggelis signed a three years length contract with the Super League side Veria.

Tsiamis made his debut for Veria in Greek Cup, in a 0–2 away win against Ergotelis.
