= Nicolao Dumitru =

Italian footballer

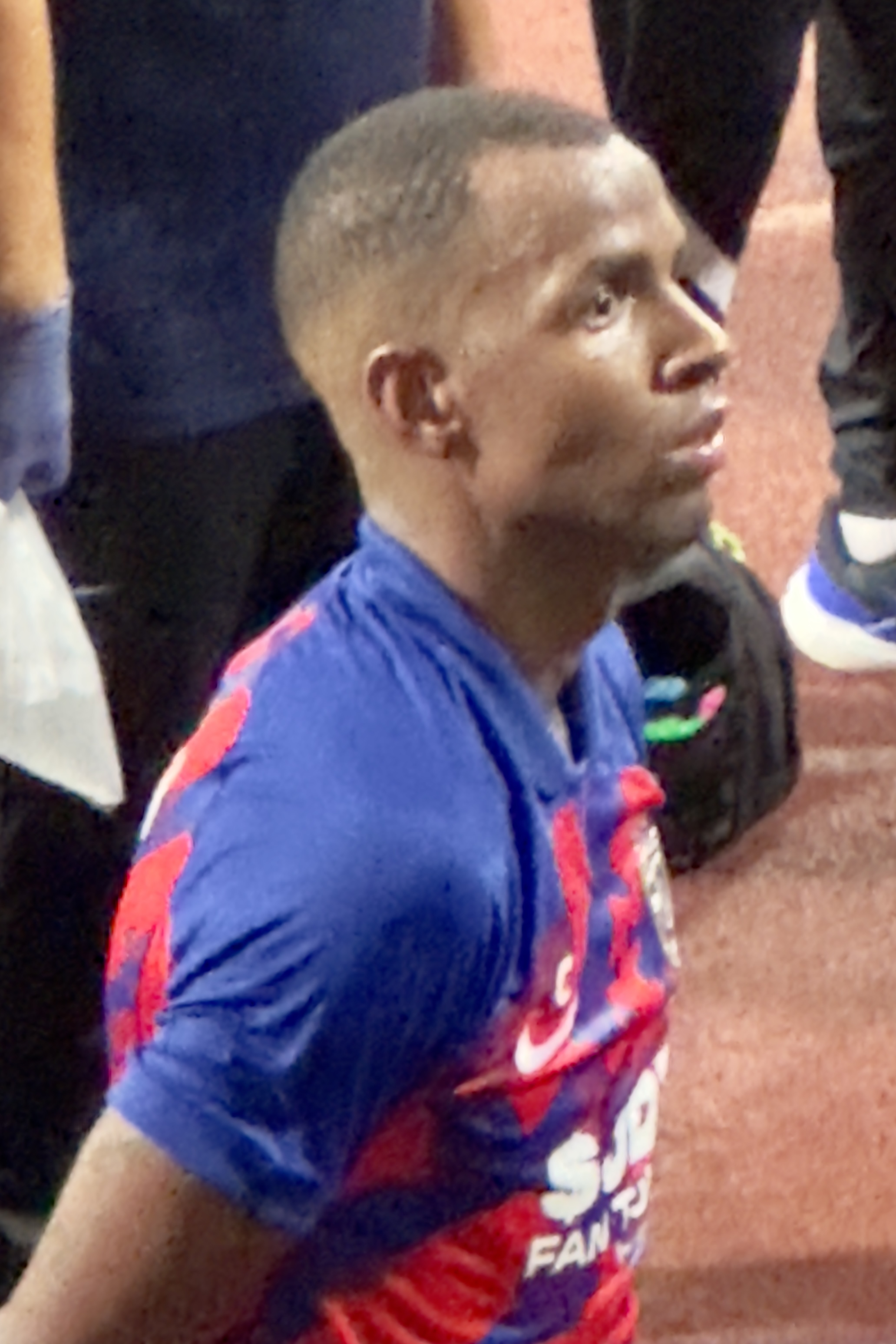
- Dumitru with Johor Darul Ta'zim in 2024

Personal information
- Full name: Nicolao Manuel Dumitru Cardoso
- Date of birth: 12 October 1991 (age 35)
- Place of birth: Nacka, Sweden
- Height: 1.85 m (6 ft 1 in)
- Positions: Left winger; forward

Youth career
- –2004: Massetana
- 2005–2010: Empoli
- 2010–2011: Napoli

Senior career*
Years	Team	Apps	(Gls)
2008–2010	Empoli	2	(0)
2010–2017	Napoli	9	(0)
2011–2012	→ Empoli (loan)	25	(4)
2012–2013	→ Ternana (loan)	15	(1)
2013–2014	→ Cittadella (loan)	18	(1)
2014	→ Reggina (loan)	13	(2)
2014–2015	→ Veria (loan)	27	(6)
2015–2016	→ Latina (loan)	34	(7)
2016–2017	→ Nottingham Forest (loan)	10	(1)
2017–2018	Alcorcón	12	(2)
2018–2019	Gimnàstic	13	(1)
2019	Livorno	8	(0)
2019–2021	Gaz Metan Mediaș	41	(12)
2021	Suwon Samsung Bluewings	17	(1)
2022	UTA Arad	13	(3)
2022–2023	Bnei Sakhnin	28	(3)
2023–2024	Buriram United	5	(0)
2024–2025	Johor Darul Ta'zim	0	(0)
2024–2025	→ PSS Sleman (loan)	28	(6)
2025–2026	Kuala Lumpur City	20	(2)

International career
2009–2010	Italy U19	8	(1)
2010–2011	Italy U20	9	(2)
- * Club domestic league appearances and goals as of 1 July 2026

Nicolao Manuel Dumitru Cardoso (born 12 October 1991) is an Italian professional footballer who plays as a left winger or a forward.

== Club career ==
=== Empoli ===
Dumitru started his professional career at Empoli, in a match during the 2008–09 season in Serie B. He also played another game in the following season, still at Serie B level.

=== Napoli ===
On 31 August 2010, he was signed by Serie A club S.S.C. Napoli at age 18 and 11 months. He failed to break into the first team during his period at Napoli, making only nine Serie A appearances at the club. Dumitru also played a few games for the reserve.

==== Return to Empoli ====
On 20 July 2011, it was announced Dumitru would return to Empoli in Serie B for the 2011–12 season on a one-year loan basis. On 27 August he scored on his debut, in the first match of the league, against Juve Stabia.

==== Further Italian loan spells ====
On 23 July 2012, Dumitru joined Serie B club Ternana on a season-long loan deal until the end of the 2012–13 season. On 31 January 2013 the loan was terminated. Dumitru joined Citadella on a temporary deal the same day. He joined Reggina on loan for the 2013–14 season.

==== Loan to Veria ====
On 13 August 2014, Greek club Veria announced the loan signing of Dumitru from Napoli on a one-year deal. He debuted on 24 August 2014 in the season's premiere home match against Skoda Xanthi where he scored his first goal. On 13 September 2014, in a match against Kerkyra, he scored his second goal and was the victim of "derogatory and racist remarks" Horacio Cardozo. The incident was reported by Veria's squad and Cardozo was invited by the Hellenic Football Federation to further give an explanation of the incident that took place. The HFF found Cardozo not guilty due to the lack of strong evidence. Dumitru was twice nominated for the Best Goal award for the goals that he scored on the first matchday as well as on the third, and won the award for his second goal in the championship. He also scored twice on his 2014–15 Greek Cup debut in home 4–1 victory against Ermionida. He got his first assist with Veria against PAS Giannina where Nikos Kaltsas scored. He scored his third championship goal in a home victory against Levadiakos during Super League's seventh matchday.

==== Loan to Nottingham Forest ====
On 30 August 2016, Dumitru joined Nottingham Forest on a season-long loan. On 30 December 2016, he scored his first goal for the club in a 3–1 lost against Newcastle United.

=== Alcorcón ===
On 1 August 2017, Dumitru signed a two-year deal with Spanish Segunda División club AD Alcorcón.

=== Gimnàstic ===
On 11 January 2018, he moved to fellow league team Gimnàstic de Tarragona.

=== Livorno ===
On 5 February 2019, Dumitru signed with Italian club Livorno.

=== Gaz Metan Mediaș ===
On 25 July 2019, Dumitru signed a two-year contract with Romanian club Gaz Metan Mediaș.

=== Suwon Samsung Bluewings ===
On 14 January 2021, Dumitru signed a contract with Korean club Suwon Bluewings.

=== UTA Arad ===
On 17 January 2021, Dumitru moved to Romania to sign with UTA Arad

=== Bnei Sakhnin ===
In July 2022, Dumitru successively signed a one-year contract for Israel club, Bnei Sakhnin.

=== Buriram United ===
On 8 July 2023, Dumitru moved to Thailand giants, Buriram United.

=== Johor Darul Ta'zim ===
On 3 February 2024, Dumitru moved to Malaysia giants, Johor Darul Ta'zim.

=== PSS Sleman ===
On 30 July 2024, Dumitru move to Indonesian club, PSS Sleman.

== International career ==
Dumitru was eligible to play international football for Sweden by birth, Brazil through his mother, Romania through his father and Italy through residency, his family having migrated there from Sweden when he was a child.

With the Italy U-19 national team in 2010, he took part in the U-19 European Championship. He was also a member of the Italy U-20 national team.

== Personal life ==
Dumitru was born in Nacka, Sweden to a Romanian father (who later took Italian citizenship) and an Afro-Brazilian mother, and successively moved to Empoli, Tuscany in 1998 with his parents. He is fluent in Romanian.

== Career statistics ==
As of match played 17 May 2026

Appearances and goals by club, season and competition
Club	Season	Division	League		National cup (Note: Includes Coppa Italia, Greek Cup, FA Cup, Copa del Rey, Cupa României, Korean FA Cup, Israeli State Cup, Malaysia FA Cup)		Continental		Other		Total	
Club	Season	Division	Apps	Goals	Apps	Goals	Apps	Goals	Apps	Goals	Apps	Goals
Empoli	2008–09	Serie B	1	0	0	0	—		—		1	0
Empoli	2009–10	Serie B	1	0	0	0	—		—		1	0
Empoli	2010–11	Serie B	—		1	0	—		—		1	0
Empoli	Total		2	0	1	0	—		—		3	0
Napoli	2010–11	Serie A	9	0	0	0	3 (Note: Appearances in UEFA Europa League)	0	—		12	0
Empoli (loan)	2011–12	Serie B	25	4	2	0	—		—		27	4
Ternana (loan)	2012–13	Serie B	15	1	2	0	—		—		17	1
Cittadella (loan)	2012–13	Serie B	5	0	—		—		—		5	0
Cittadella (loan)	2013–14	Serie B	13	1	2	0	—		—		15	1
Cittadella (loan)	Total		18	1	2	0	—		—		20	1
Reggina (loan)	2013–14	Serie B	13	2	—		—		—		13	2
Veria (loan)	2014–15	Super League Greece	27	6	3	2	–		–		30	8
Latina (loan)	2015–16	Serie B	34	7	—		—		—		34	7
Nottingham Forest (loan)	2016–17	Championship	10	1	1	0	—		1 (Note: Appearance in EFL Cup)	0	12	1
Alcorcón	2017–18	Segunda División	12	2	1	1	—		—		13	3
Gimnàstic	2017–18	Segunda División	10	1	—		—		—		10	1
Gimnàstic	2018–19	Segunda División	3	0	1	0	—		—		4	0
Gimnàstic	Total		13	1	1	0	—		—		14	1
Livorno	2018–19	Serie B	8	0	—		—		—		8	0
Gaz Metan	2019–20	Liga I	29	5	1	0	—		—		30	5
Gaz Metan	2020–21	Liga I	12	7	0	0	—		—		12	7
Gaz Metan	Total		41	12	1	0	—		—		42	12
Suwon Bluewings	2021	K League 1	17	1	2	0	—		—		19	1
UTA Arad	2021–22	Liga I	13	3	—		—		—		13	3
Bnei Sakhnin	2022–23	Liga I	28	3	2	0	—		5 (Note: Appearances in Toto Cup)	2	35	5
Buriram United	2023–24	Thai League 1	5	0	0	0	2 (Note: Appearances in AFC Champions League)	0	1 (Note: Appearances in Thai League Cup)	1	8	1
Johor Darul Ta'zim	2024–25	Malaysia Super League	0	0	0	0	—		0	0	0	0
PSS Sleman (loan)	2024–25	Liga 1	28	6	0	0	—		0	0	28	6
Kuala Lumpur City	2025–26	Malaysia Super League	20	2	2	0	—		4 (Note: Appearances in Malaysia Cup)	2	26	4
Career total			338	52	18	3	3	0	6	2	365	57
