= Kenan Bargan =

Greek footballer (born 1988)

Personal information
- Date of birth: 25 October 1988 (age 38)
- Place of birth: Xanthi, Greece
- Height: 1.78 m (5 ft 10 in)
- Position: Winger

Youth career
- –2008: Aspis Xanthi

Senior career*
Years	Team	Apps	(Gls)
2008–2010	Odysseas Anagennisi	54	(10)
2010–2015	Veria	117	(9)
2015–2016	AEL Kalloni	13	(2)
2016	Panionios	14	(0)
2016–2018	Aris	42	(7)
2018–2019	AEL	22	(3)
2020–2021	Karmiotissa	19	(2)
2021–2022	Apollon Pontus	10	(1)
2024–2025	Aris Piges		
2025	Svoronos		
- * Club domestic league appearances and goals as of 20:00, 19 January 2022 (UTC).

Kenan Bargan (Greek: Κενάν Μπαργκάν Kenán Mpargkán, born 25 October 1988) is a Greek professional footballer who plays as a winger.

== Early life ==
Bargan was born in Xanthi, Thrace to Pomak Muslim parents.

== Club career ==
=== Veria ===
In 2010 aged 21 Bargan made his first big career move moving to Veria. Bargan remained at Veria for 5 years and played 4 years in the Superleague with them.

=== AEL Kalloni ===
Bargan left Veria and moved to AEL Kalloni however only stayed there for 6 months making 13 appearances and scoring 2 goals

=== Panionios ===
Bargan then moved to Panionios and was given the number 10 jersey. Once again only stayed for 6 months but was a crucial player in Panionios' run to a 5th-place finish and played 15 games for Panionios.

=== Aris ===
Bargan requested to be released from his contract at Panionios and was granted a release. After weeks of negotiations with Aris on transfer deadline day Bargan made his biggest career move and moved to Aris. On 29 November 2016, he scored his first goal against Asteras Tripolis in the Greek Cup. On 5 December 2016, he scored his first league goal against AEL Kalloni. On 10 December he scored another goal in an away win against Panelefsiniakos. On 18 December Bargan scored in his 4th straight game in a 3–2 win over Trikala. On 22 January 2017 he netted another one against Acharnaikos. On 17 July 2017, he extended his contract for 2 years. On 31 August 2018, he terminated his contract by mutual consent.

=== AEL ===
On 11 September 2018, he signed a two-year contract with AEL. On 30 October 2018, he scored a brace in a comfortable 4–1 home win against Irodotos for the Greek Cup.

On 1 December 2018, he was the MVP of an emphatic 4–2 home win against Panionios, scoring one goal and giving two assists.

== Career statistics ==
=== Club ===
As of 8 May 2019

Club	Season	League			Cup		Continental		Other		Total	
Club	Season	Division	Apps	Goals	Apps	Goals	Apps	Goals	Apps	Goals	Apps	Goals
Veria	2010–11	Football League	16	0	2	1	-	-	-	-	18	1
Veria	2012–12	Football League	24	4	0	0	-	-	-	-	26	4
Veria	2012–13	Super League	21	2	4	0	-	-	-	-	25	2
Veria	2013–14	Super League	31	2	1	0	-	-	-	-	32	2
Veria	2014–15	Super League	23	1	3	1	-	-	-	-	26	2
Veria	Total		117	9	10	2	0	0	0	0	127	11
AEL Kalloni	2015–16	Super League	13	2	4	1	-	-	-	-	17	3
AEL Kalloni	Total		13	2	4	1	0	0	0	0	17	3
Panionios	2015–16	Super League	14	0	0	0	-	-	-	-	16	0
Panionios	Total		14	0	0	0	0	0	0	0	16	0
Aris	2016–17	Football League	23	4	3	1	-	-	-	-	26	5
Aris	2017–18	Football League	19	3	2	0	-	-	-	-	21	3
Aris	Total		42	7	5	1	0	0	0	0	47	8
AEL	2018–19	Super League	19	1	3	2	-	-	-	-	22	3
AEL	Total		19	1	3	2	0	0	0	0	22	3
Career total			205	19	24	6	0	0	0	0	229	25

== Honours ==
=== Veria ===
- Football League: Runner-up: 2011–12
