= Xavi Ginard =

Spanish footballer (born 1986)

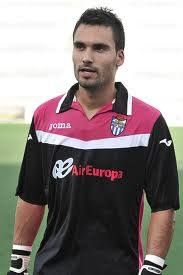
- Ginard playing for Atlético Baleares in 2012

Personal information
- Full name: Xavier Ginard Torres
- Date of birth: 11 October 1986 (age 40)
- Place of birth: Artà, Spain
- Height: 1.78 m (5 ft 10 in)
- Position: Goalkeeper

Youth career
- Artà
- Manacor
- 2002–2005: Barcelona

Senior career*
Years	Team	Apps	(Gls)
2005–2006	Felanitx		
2006–2007	Manacor		
2007–2009	Binissalem	58	(0)
2009–2010	Sabadell	3	(0)
2010–2011	Campos	35	(0)
2011–2014	Atlético Baleares	49	(0)
2014–2015	Veria	5	(0)
2015–2016	Aris	13	(0)
2016–2019	Olot	99	(0)
2019–2022	Atlético Baleares	21	(0)
2022–2023	Manacor	28	(0)
2023–2024	Poblense	28	(0)
- * Club domestic league appearances and goals

Xavier 'Xavi' Ginard Torres (born 11 October 1986) is a Spanish former professional footballer who played as a goalkeeper.

== Club career ==
Born in Artà, Balearic Islands, Ginard was a youth product of FC Barcelona's La Masia. He made his debut as a senior with CE Felanitx in the 2005–06 season, in Tercera División.

Ginard moved to fellow league club CE Manacor in June 2006, and first arrived in Segunda División B in 2009 after agreeing to a deal at CE Sabadell FC. After acting as a backup to David de Navas during the campaign he returned to the fourth tier, signing for CE Campos.

On 2 August 2011, Ginard joined CD Atlético Baleares in division three. Initially playing second-fiddle to Biel Ribas and Ian Mackay in his first two years, he was an undisputed starter in his third, appearing in 30 matches as a captain and being also awarded the Ricardo Zamora Trophy for the category.

On 28 May 2014, Ginard moved abroad for the first time in his career, signing a two-year contract with Super League Greece side Veria FC. He played his first match as a professional on 24 September, starting in a 4–1 home win against A.E. Ermionida F.C. in the second round of the Greek Football Cup. In the following stage of the same competition, he kept a clean sheet in a 2–0 away victory over Ergotelis FC.

Ginard made his league debut on 7 February 2015, in a 1–1 home draw to Atromitos FC. After countryman Jonathan López's return in the summer he was deemed surplus to requirements, and his contract was mutually terminated.

== Career statistics ==
=== Club ===
As of match played 10 February 2021

Appearances and goals by club, season and competition
Club	Season	League			National Cup		Other		Total	
Club	Season	Division	Apps	Goals	Apps	Goals	Apps	Goals	Apps	Goals
Sabadell	2009–10	Segunda División B	3	0	0	0	—		3	0
Atlético Baleares	2011–12	Segunda División B	13	0	0	0	4 (Note: Appearance(s) in Promotion Playoffs)	0	17	0
Atlético Baleares	2012–13	Segunda División B	6	0	1	0	—		7	0
Atlético Baleares	2013–14	Segunda División B	30	0	0	0	—		30	0
Atlético Baleares	Total		49	0	1	0	4	0	54	0
Veria	2014–15	Football League Greece	5	0	5	0	—		10	0
Olot	2017–18	Segunda División B	35	0	3	0	—		38	0
Olot	2018–19	Segunda División B	34	0	0	0	—		34	0
Olot	Total		69	0	3	0	0	0	72	0
Atlético Baleares	2019–20	Segunda División B	10	0	1	0	1	0	12	0
Atlético Baleares	2020–21	Segunda División B	5	0	1	0	—		6	0
Atlético Baleares	Total		15	0	2	0	1	0	18	0
Career total			141	0	11	0	5	0	157	0
