= Roberto Battión =

Argentine footballer (born 1982)

Personal information
- Full name: Roberto Miguel Battión
- Date of birth: March 1, 1982 (age 44)
- Place of birth: Santa Fe, Argentina
- Height: 1.88 m (6 ft 2 in)
- Position: Defensive midfielder

Senior career*
Years	Team	Apps	(Gls)
2002–2007	Unión de Santa Fe	84	(4)
2007–2008	Argentinos Juniors	27	(4)
2008–2010	Aris	20	(1)
2009–2010	→ Banfield (loan)	30	(3)
2010–2013	Independiente	21	(2)
2013–2014	All Boys	?	(?)
2014–2016	Veria	27	(1)
- * Club domestic league appearances and goals as of 20 December 2015

Roberto Miguel Battión (born March 1, 1982, in Santa Fe) is an Argentine football midfielder. He currently plays for Veria of the Super League Greece.

== Career ==
Battión started his professional career in the Argentine Primera División with Unión de Santa Fe in 2002, but at the end of the 2002–03 season the club were relegated due to their poor points average. He stayed with the club for several seasons in the Argentine second division before returning to the Primera in 2007 to join Argentinos Juniors. He quickly established himself as a valued member of the first team squad.

In 2008 Battión joined Aris of Greece, but returned to Argentina in 2009 on loan to Banfield, where he was a key member of the squad that won the 2009 Apertura championship appearing in the majority of their games.

In July 2010, after his loan contract at Banfield expired, Independiente bought Battión from Aris on a 3 million US dollars fee.

Left Independiente in the summer of 2013 and joined Club Atletico All Boys of the first division.

On August 18, 2014, Roberto signed in Veria Roberto scored his first goal with Veria in a home victory against Levadiakos. He also counts two assists. On 1 February 2015, he was sent off with a second yellow card, for a free kick. He ironically then applauded the referee for that decision, Sotiris Balafas was also sent off in 11', and the fans of Veria responded to the applauding as they recognized the message of Battión's action. Giannis Maniatis then, attacked towards the player and a mini fight begun into the football field between the players. Battión's action was accept with great enthusiasm from media as well as from the fans of Veria. These events took place in a 2–0 home defeat against Olympiacos F.C. Battión has an oral renewal contract agreement but he expects for the football court of EPO to decide whether Veria will be relegated if found guilty for the fixed match case against Olympiacos in 2013.

== Honours ==
Banfield

- Argentine Primera División (1): 2009 Apertura

Independiente

- Copa Sudamericana (1): 2010
