= Cédric Mandjeck =

Cameroonian footballer

- Cédric Mandjeck, Cameroonian footballer

Personal information
- Full name: Jacques Parfait Cédric Mandjeck
- Date of birth: 8 April 1993 (age 33)
- Place of birth: Yaoundé, Cameroon
- Height: 1.73 m (5 ft 8 in)
- Position: Attacking midfielder

Team information
- Current team: Beauregard Rennes
- Number: 8

Youth career
- Fundación Privada Samuel Eto´o
- 2010–2011: Torre Levante
- 2012–2013: Valencia

Senior career*
Years	Team	Apps	(Gls)
2013–2014	Valencia B	16	(0)
2014–2015	Veria	2	(0)
2015–2016	Pobla Mafumet	0	(0)
2016	Alzira	8	(0)
2016–2018	Al-Rustaq	12	(0)
2019	Żejtun Corinthians		
2019–2020	Abia Warriors		
2020–2021	Guichen		
2021–2023	Guipry Messac		
2023–	Beauregard Rennes		
- * Club domestic league appearances and goals

Jacques Parfait Cédric Mandjeck (born 8 April 1993), commonly known as Cédric Mandjeck, is a Cameroonian footballer who plays for Beauregard Rennes in the French Régional 2.

== Club career ==
Mandjeck with Veria.

=== Youth career ===
Born in Yaoundé, Cameroon, Cédric began his career as a footballer in 2008 with Fundación Privada Samuel Eto´o's football school in Barcelona, Spain.

At the age of 14, Mandjeck was spotted during a tournament in Yaoundé, Cameroon, by a Spanish scout, and soon moved to Spain. I didn't hesitate for long. I lost my father at a very early age, so I was a street urchin living off and on with my aunt. I used to commit petty thefts and get into fights. Soccer took me out of that environment, Mandjeck said in an interview about his move to Spain in his younger days.

Mandjeck traveled to Spain alone at the age of 14, and although the plan was for him to transfer to Valencia CF, due to his age, he could not yet due to the rules, which prohibits minors from playing in professional clubs. He was therefore sent back to Cameroon, but ended up going alone to Paris to pursue his dream of a football career. Cédric got back in touch with the agent who initially arranged the trip to Spain, and from there arranged another trial, this time at Atlético Madrid. However, he left the club again when Atlético's plan was to rent him out to a non-professional club, but when that fell through, he didn't get a contract here either. He then went on trial at Levante UD, where the same story repeated itself.

In January 2010, he moved to CF Torre Levante, as he turned 18 years old. In 2012, he signed a one-year contract with Valencia CF and represented their U-18 and U-19 sides.

=== Valencia B ===
Impressed with his display for the junior squads, the club management decided to promote the Cameroonian midfielder to the Che's, Valencia CF Mestalla also known as Valencia B. He made his Segunda División B debut on 15 September 2013 in a 2–0 loss against CD Olímpic de Xàtiva as he came on as a late substitute for Alex Quintanilla.

On 8 October 2013, he made his first team debut, playing the entire second half in a 7–1 friendly win against Burjassot CF. He finished 2013–14 Segunda División B with 16 appearances and helped his side narrowly avoided relegation.

=== Veria ===
He then moved to Greece where on 3 September 2014, he signed a short-term contract with Super League Greece side, Veria F.C. He made his club debut on 29 October 2014 in a 2–0 win over Ergotelis F.C. in the 2014–15 Greek Football Cup. He made his Super League debut on 20 December 2014 in a 1–1 draw against Panthrakikos F.C.

=== Alzira ===
He moved back to Spain and more accurately to Alzira, Valencia where he signed a short-term contract with Tercera División side, UD Alzira. He finished with 8 appearances in the 2015–16 Tercera División.

=== Al-Rustaq ===
He moved to Oman and more accurately to Rustaq where on 11 September 2016, he signed a one-year contract with Oman Professional League side, Al-Rustaq SC. He made his Oman Professional League debut on 18 September 2016 in a 2–1 loss against Omani giants, Al-Oruba SC. He also made his Oman Professional League Cup debut on 11 November 2016 in a 5-4 penalty loss against Muscat Club in the First Round and his Sultan Qaboos Cup debut on 17 November 2016 in a 3–0 win over Al-Nahda Club.

=== Later career ===
After a spell at Maltese Challenge League side Żejtun Corinthians in the first half part of 2019, and later at Nigerian club Abia Warriors in the second half of 2019, he played the 2020–21 season at French club FC Guichen.

Ahead of the 2021–22 season, Mandjeck joined another French club; FC Guipry Messac. Ahead of the 2023–24 season, he moved to FC Beauregard Rennes.

=== Club career statistics ===
Club	Season	Division	League		Cup		Continental		Other		Total	
Club	Season	Division	Apps	Goals	Apps	Goals	Apps	Goals	Apps	Goals	Apps	Goals
Valencia B	2013–14	Segunda División B	16	0	0	0	0	0	0	0	16	0
Valencia B	Total		16	0	0	0	0	0	0	0	11	1
Veria	2014–15	Super League Greece	2	0	2	0	0	0	0	0	4	0
Veria	Total		2	0	2	0	0	0	0	0	4	0
Alzira	2015–16	Tercera División	8	0	0	0	0	0	0	0	8	0
Alzira	Total		8	0	0	0	0	0	0	0	8	0
Al-Rustaq	2016–17	Oman Professional League	12	0	1	0	0	0	0	0	12	0
Al-Rustaq	Total		12	0	1	0	0	0	0	0	13	0
Career total			30	0	3	0	0	0	0	0	33	0
