= Javier Cámpora =

Argentine footballer

Personal information
- Full name: Javier Edgardo Cámpora Bustamante
- Date of birth: 7 January 1980 (age 46)
- Place of birth: Rosario, Argentina
- Position: Striker

Youth career
- Rosario Central

Senior career*
Years	Team	Apps	(Gls)
1998–2001	Rosario Central	16	(2)
2001–2003	Fénix	54	(17)
2003–2004	Rosario Central	24	(8)
2005	Deportes Concepción	20	(7)
2005–2006	Tiro Federal	36	(18)
2006	Cruz Azul	11	(0)
2007–2008	Chiapas	33	(13)
2007–2008	→ Puebla (loan)	14	(4)
2008	Jaguares de Tapachula	3	(3)
2009–2010	Aris	39	(18)
2010	Colo-Colo	13	(4)
2011–2012	Huracán	47	(19)
2012–2013	Racing Club	25	(2)
2013–2014	All Boys	31	(3)
2014–2015	Veria	28	(5)
- * Club domestic league appearances and goals

Javier Edgardo Cámpora (born 7 January 1980 in Rosario) is a former Argentine football player who played as a striker.

== Career ==
He is a striker who has played professional football in Argentina, Uruguay, Chile, Mexico and Aris in Greece.

Cámpora's most notable achievement to date, was becoming the top scorer in the Apertura 2005 tournament of the Argentine Primera. He scored 13 goals despite the fact that Tiro Federal finished 19th and was relegated to Primera B Nacional.

=== Aris ===
In 21, January 2009 he signed a 1 1/2-year contract with Aris After nine games in Super League Greece (season 2008–09) he achieved to score five times. After having bad times with the club's former coach, Iomar Mazinho, he finally found his position on the team with the coming of Héctor Cúper. He scored 11 times in 26 games at the Greek Superleague, including two goals against PAOK and two for the Greek Cup (season 2009–2010). In April 2010 he signed a two-year contract with Aris, but unexpectedly two months later he left from the club for personal reasons.

=== Later years ===
One month later he signed on Chilian giants Colo-Colo but he failed to become a part of the team although he scored 4 goals on 13 matches. After leaving Colo-Colo he signed with Argentinian Huracan where although he had very good presence, 20 matches – 11 goals, the club finally relegated after a 2–0 loss from Gimnasia La Plata in Argentina's relegation playoffs in June 2011.

=== Veria ===
Cámpora debuted for Veria on 24 August 2014 against Skoda Xanthi. He also played as a team regular in matchday 2 against OFI in Heraklion. He scored his first goal against Kerkyra on 14 August 2014 equalizing Javito's early goal. He scored his second goal for Veria in the Greek Cup first matchday against Ermionida. He scored his second league goal against PAS Giannina with a close header after Roberto Battión's first header in the six-yard box. Cámpora scored his third goal for Veria in a 2–2 home draw against Panionios with an amazing bicycle kick which was named as the best goal of 9th matchday. Cámpora has also provide three assists to his teammates. He scored his fourth championship goal in a 2–0 home win against Platanias during the thirteen round of Superleague, taking the rebound from Ben's 35-yard shot. Cámpora scored the opening goal in a 2–0 home win against Niki Volos. Javier scored again, in a 2–1 away defeat against Panionios in the Greek Cup. Cámpora's contract was set to expire on 31 June 2015 but it was terminated after mutual consistency on 26 May 2015. During his spell at Veria he scored five times, had three assists and appeared in 28 league games. He also scored twice in four appearances in the Greek Cup.

== Post-retirement ==
Cámpora switched to construction sector and has managed parking lots. In addition, he has worked as a football agent.
