= Carlos Caballero (Spanish footballer) =

Spanish footballer (born 1984)

Personal information
- Full name: Carlos Caballero Pérez
- Date of birth: 5 October 1984 (age 42)
- Place of birth: Alcorcón, Spain
- Height: 1.78 m (5 ft 10 in)
- Position: Midfielder

Youth career
- Rayo Vallecano
- Alcorcón

Senior career*
Years	Team	Apps	(Gls)
2003–2006	Alcorcón	51	(0)
2006–2008	Linares	56	(6)
2008–2011	Cádiz	92	(12)
2011–2018	Córdoba	143	(8)
2015	→ Veria (loan)	7	(1)
2018–2019	Fuenlabrada	33	(0)
Total		382	(27)
- * Club domestic league appearances and goals

Carlos Caballero Pérez (born 5 October 1984) is a Spanish former professional footballer who played as a midfielder.

== Club career ==
Born in Alcorcón, Madrid, Caballero made his senior debut with local AD Alcorcón in the 2002–03 season, in Segunda División B. In the summer of 2006, he moved to CD Linares in the same league.

On 11 August 2008, Caballero joined Cádiz CF also of division three. He was an ever-present figure in his debut campaign, appearing in 37 matches and scoring six goals as the Andalusians returned to Segunda División after a one-year absence.

Caballero played his first match as a professional on 30 August 2009, starting in a 0–1 home loss against UD Salamanca. He appeared regularly during the season, but his team were eventually relegated.

On 15 June 2011, Caballero moved to Córdoba CF still in the second tier. On 11 November 2012, he scored his first professional goal, his side's fourth in a 5–3 away victory over SD Ponferradina.

Caballero contributed 25 games and five goals in 2013–14, as Córdoba returned to La Liga after more than four decades. He missed the last four months of the season due to an anterior cruciate ligament injury contracted on 23 February 2014 against Real Jaén, and only returned to action on 23 November, playing injury time in a 2–2 away draw with Elche CF which also signified his debut in the Spanish top flight, at the age of 30.

On 30 January 2015, Caballero was loaned to Super League Greece side Veria F.C. until June. He returned to the Estadio Nuevo Arcángel in July, being sparingly used the following campaigns.

On 24 January 2018, Caballero terminated his contract with Córdoba and signed for CF Fuenlabrada of the third division, for two years. On 3 September 2019, after helping to the club's first-ever promotion to the second tier, he announced his retirement at the age of 34.
