= Nikos Kaltsas =

Greek footballer

Personal information
- Full name: Nikolaos Kaltsas
- Date of birth: 3 May 1990 (age 36)
- Place of birth: Veria, Greece
- Height: 1.72 m (5 ft 8 in)
- Position: Forward

Team information
- Current team: Asteras Tripolis
- Number: 20

Youth career
- 2005–2008: Veria

Senior career*
| Years | Team | Apps | (Gls) |
| 2008–2015 | Veria | 145 | (29) |
| 2015–2016 | Panathinaikos | 20 | (5) |
| 2016–2019 | Asteras Tripolis | 71 | (11) |
| 2019–2022 | Anorthosis | 65 | (10) |
| 2022–2023 | Karmiotissa | 30 | (6) |
| 2023– | Asteras Tripolis | 91 | (13) |

International career
| 2008 | Greece U19 | 2 | (0) |
| 2011 | Greece U21 | 1 | (0) |
- * Club domestic league appearances and goals as of 20 October 2026

Nikos Kaltsas (Greek: Νίκος Καλτσάς, born 3 May 1990) is a Greek professional footballer who plays as a winger for Super League club Asteras Tripolis.

== Club career ==
=== Veria ===
Born in Veria, Kaltsas started his career in the youth squad of his local club. He signed his first professional contract in 2007 after coming through his local club's youth ranks and has remained with Veria every season. After seven years, playing as a team regular, Kaltsas decided to leave the club and join Panathinaikos on a free transfer, as he didn't renew his contract which was set to expire on 30 June 2015. The player joined his new club on 1 July 2015. In the beginning of 2014–15 season he was named as the first vice captain of the club.

Any Greek footballer aims to play abroad and Kaltsas is not an exception and has so far reached twice from making his dream a reality. The first was when a proposal came from Segunda División club Hércules CF of Kike Hernández for a loan of six months, giving Veria an amount of €50,000. But when it was certain for this move, another offer arrived that of Serie B club Varese. The Italians offered €150,000 plus 20% resale rate, but this deal never closed. The announcement of the acquisition from Greek giants Panathinaikos just a few hours before a Super League game against Panetolikos, provoked mixed feelings to Veria's fans.

His impressive performances during the first half of 2014–15 season earned him the next step in his career. He was also a part of AEK's transfer list, though financial differences, regarding his contract, didn't allow the transfer to be completed. Kaltsas had 159 appearances (32 goals, 24 assists) in all competitions with the club.

=== Panathinaikos ===
On 3 January 2015, Kaltsas agreed on a three years contract with Panathinaikos. On 24 August 2015, he made his debut with the club in an away 2–1 win against Panetolikos. On 13 December 2015, Kaltsas scored his first goal with the club in the Super League, helping his club win 2–0 Asteras Tripolis at no-fans-attended Leoforos Stadium. On 11 January 2016, Kaltsas made an excellent appearance along with an early goal in the second half, helping his club to escape with a 2–0 win against AEL Kalloni and climbed at the third Super League position.

=== Asteras Tripolis ===
On 25 June 2016, Panathinaikos accepted Asteras Tripolis' €150,000 bid for the player and he signed a three-year contract with the club. The 26-year-old former player of Veria scored five goals in 27 appearances with the Greens during 2015–16 season, but was not in Italian manager Andrea Stramaccioni's current plans. On 24 November 2018, in new coach Georgios Paraschos' debut, Kaltsas scored a goal in the last minute of the game sealing a vital 2–0 home win game in his club's effort to avoid relegation.

On 23 January 2019, Kaltsas scored in a dramatic 5–3 home win against AEL in the Greek Cup round of 16. His team won 7–6 on aggregate and qualified for the quarter-finals of the contest. On 23 February 2019, he scored in a 1–1 home draw against Atromitos.

On 13 May 2019, he signed a new contract, running until the summer of 2022.

=== Anorthosis ===
On 6 August 2019, Kaltsas joined Anorthosis on a three-year deal.

== International career ==
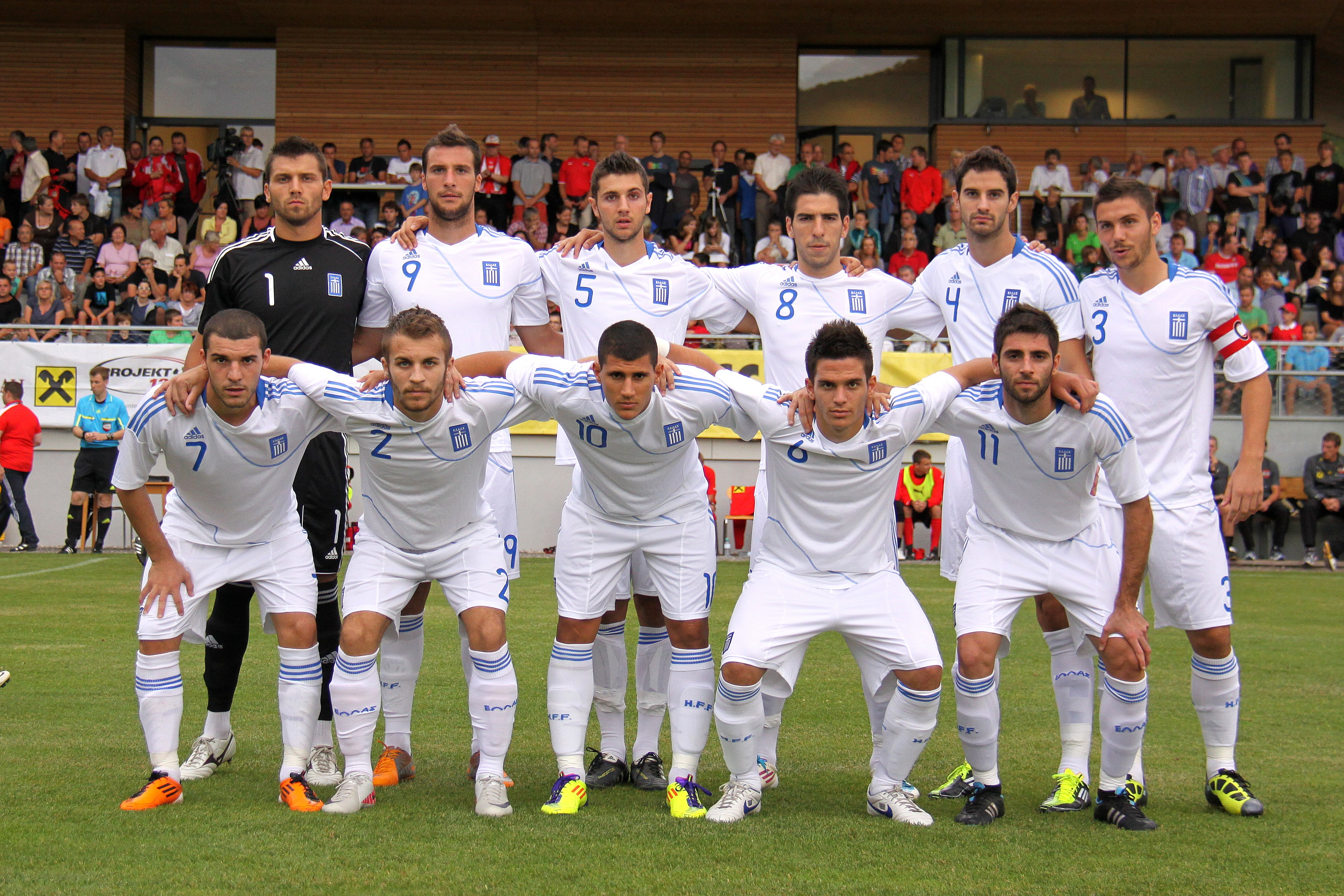
Kaltsas (left, bottom row) playing for Greece in 2011

Kaltsas was also part of the Greece U19 and Greece U21 squads.

== Honours ==
=== Club ===
Anorthosis Famagusta

- Cypriot Cup: 2020–21

Veria

- Football League: runner-up: 2011–12; third place: 2006–07
- Football League 2: winner: 2009–10

=== Individual ===
- Football League Talent of the Season: 2010–11
- Football League 2 Talent of the Season: 2009–10
- Best Goal award(s): Matchday 11, Matchday 17
- Super League Greece Greek Footballer of the Season: 2014–15
