= Alexandros Vergonis =

Greek footballer

Personal information
- Full name: Alexandros Vergonis
- Date of birth: 1 December 1985 (age 40)
- Place of birth: Veria, Greece
- Height: 1.88 m (6 ft 2 in)
- Position: Central midfielder

Team information
- Current team: Volos (assistant)

Youth career
- –2002: Apollon Kalamarias

Senior career*
Years	Team	Apps	(Gls)
2002–2006	Apollon Kalamarias	1	(1)
2005	→ ILTEX Lykoi (loan)	16	(1)
2006–2007	Olympiacos Volos	39	(0)
2007–2009	AEL	2	(0)
2009	Olympiacos Volos	8	(0)
2009–2010	Rodos	30	(0)
2011–2016	Veria	90	(10)
2016–2018	Apollon Pontus	19	(3)
2018–2021	Veria	61	(7)

Managerial career
- 2021–2022: Veria (assistant)
- 2023–2024: Athens Kallithea (assistant)
- 2024–2025: Panserraikos (assistant)
- 2025: Panserraikos (caretaker)
- 2025–2026: Tondela (assistant)
- 2026: Estrela da Amadora (assistant)
- 2026–: Volos (assistant)
- * Club domestic league appearances and goals

Alexandros Vergonis (Greek: Αλέξανδρος Βεργώνης, born 1 December 1985) is a retired Greek professional footballer who played as a central midfielder. He was an emblematic captain of Veria. He currently works as the assistant manager of Super League club Volos.

== Career ==
Vergonis scored his first two goals against Platanias in a 5–0 home win in Football League championship. On 12 April 2014, Alexandros scored the only goal in a match between Veria and Asteras Tripoli for the Super League Greece and kept Veria in the category. Also, his goal was the 400th goal of all time for Veria in Superleague. On 23 May 2014, Alexandros signed a one-year contract extension with Veria. Vergonis scored again for Veria in a 0–2 away win against Ergotelis during the second matchday of the Greek Football Cup. Vergonis signed a one-year contract expansion on 2 June 2015.

On 26 July 2016 he joined Apollon Pontus. At the end of the season Apollon won the title and was promoted to the Football League. On 12 November 2017 he scored two goals in a 3–3 away draw against Panserraikos.

== Personal life ==
Vergonis holds a mathematician degree.

== Honours ==
=== Veria ===
- Gamma Ethniki: 2018–19
- Imathia Cup: 2018–19
- Football League: 2020–21

=== Individual ===
- Football League 2 Player of the Year: 2006–07
