= Angelos Vertzos =

Greek footballer

Personal information
- Date of birth: 27 May 1983 (age 43)
- Place of birth: Athens, Greece
- Height: 1.75 m (5 ft 9 in)
- Position: Centre-back

Senior career*
Years	Team	Apps	(Gls)
2002–2005	Acharnaikos	71	(0)
2005	Paniliakos	2	(0)
2005–2006	Acharnaikos	29	(2)
2006–2007	Proodeftiki	31	(0)
2007–2008	Agios Dimitrios	5	(0)
2008–2010	Veria	46	(0)
2010–2012	Doxa Drama	41	(1)
2012–2013	Niki Volos	36	(2)
2013–2014	Apollon Smyrnis	6	(0)
2014–2015	Veria	38	(0)
2015–2016	AEL	24	(0)
2016–2018	Trikala	56	(2)
2018	Kerkyra	9	(0)
2019	Diagoras	9	(0)
2019–2020	Trikala	17	(0)
- * Club domestic league appearances and goals as of 13 August 2020 (UTC)

Angelis Vertzos (Greek: Άγγελος Βέρτζος, born 27 May 1983) is a Greek professional footballer who plays as a centre-back.

== Career ==
He played the majority of his career in the Beta and Gamma Ethniki championships. However, in 2011, his team Doxa Drama was promoted to the Super League Greece as a result of the Koriopolis scandal, despite finishing third in the promotion playoffs of the previous year.

On 7 January 2014, Veria announced the return of Vertzos to the club as he signed a contract for one-and-a-half years. His contract expired on 31 June 2015 and it wasn't renewed. On 22 July 2015 he signed a two-year contract with AEL. A year later, on 6 August 2016, Vertzos left the club by mutual agreement. On 9 August 2016 he joined Trikala. On 10 July 2017 he renewed his contract for another season.
