= Dimitrios Amarantidis =

Greek footballer

Dimitris Amarantidis
Personal information
- Date of birth: 27 July 1986 (age 40)
- Place of birth: Kozani, Greece
- Height: 1.74 m (5 ft 8 1/2 in)
- Position: Left-back

Youth career
- –2003: Kozani

Senior career*
Years	Team	Apps	(Gls)
2003–2006	Kozani	30	(0)
2006–2007	Trikala	29	(3)
2007–2008	Anagennisi Karditsa	24	(0)
2008–2010	AEK Athens	0	(0)
2008–2010	→ Anagennisi Karditsa (loan)	21	(0)
2010–2015	Veria	112	(0)
2015–2016	Agrotikos Asteras	27	(0)
2016–2024	Apollon Pontus	155	(6)
- * Club domestic league appearances and goals as of 11 March 2024

Dimitrios Amarantidis (Greek: Δημήτριος Αμαραντίδης; born 27 July 1986) is a Greek former professional footballer who played as a left-back.

== Career ==
After playing for Veria for five seasons, Amarantidis' contract expired on 30 June 2015.

== Honours ==
=== Veria ===
- Football League Runner-up: 2011–12
