= 2014–15 Super League Greece =

79th season of top-tier football league in Greece

Super League Greece
- Season: 2014–15
- Dates: 23 August 2014 – 10 May 2015
- Champions: Olympiacos; 42nd Greek title
- Relegated: Kerkyra; Ergotelis; OFI; Niki Volos
- Champions League: Olympiacos; Panathinaikos
- Europa League: Asteras Tripolis; Atromitos; PAOK
- Matches: 306
- Goals: 759 (2.48 per match)
- Top goalscorer: Jerónimo Barrales (17 goals)
- Biggest home win: Panathinaikos 5–0 Ergotelis; Olympiacos 5–0 AEL Kalloni
- Biggest away win: AEL Kalloni 0–5 Olympiacos
- Highest scoring: Panetolikos 5–2 Skoda Xanthi; Atromitos 4–3 Asteras Tripolis; Asteras Tripolis 6–1 OFI; Panathinaikos 4–3 PAOK
- All statistics correct as of 1 April 2015.

The 2014–15 Super League Greece was the 79th season of the highest tier in league of Greek football and the ninth under its current title. The season began on 23 August and ended on 11 May 2015. Olympiacos won their 42nd Greek title. The league comprises sixteen teams from the 2013–14 season and two promoted from the 2013–14 Football League.

== Teams ==
Two teams were relegated from the 2013–14 season. Apollon Smyrnis and Aris would play in Football League for the 2014–15 season.

Two teams were promoted from the 2013–14 Football League, champions Niki Volos and Kerkyra. Niki Volos were promoted back to the top level for the first time in 48 years.

Promoted from 2013–14 Football League	Relegated from 2013–14 Super League Greece
Niki Volos; Kerkyra	Apollon Smyrnis; Aris

=== Stadiums and locations ===
Location of the 2014–15 Super League Greece teams

Club	Location	Venue	Capacity	2013–14
AEL Kalloni	Mytilene	Mytilene Municipal Stadium	3,000	12th
Asteras Tripolis	Tripoli	Theodoros Kolokotronis Stadium	7,616	5th
Atromitos	Athens (Peristeri)	Peristeri Stadium	8,969	3rd
Ergotelis	Heraklion (Ammoudara)	Pankritio Stadium	26,000	7th
Kerkyra	Corfu	Kerkyra Stadium	2,191	2nd (FL)
Levadiakos	Livadeia	Levadia Municipal Stadium	6,500	9th
Niki Volos	Volos	Panthessaliko Stadium	22,307	1st (FL)
OFI	Heraklion (Kaminia)	Theodoros Vardinogiannis Stadium	8,500	6th
Olympiacos	Piraeus	Karaiskakis Stadium	33,296	1st
Panathinaikos	Athens (Ampelokipoi)	Leoforos Alexandras Stadium	16,003	4th
Panetolikos	Agrinio	Panetolikos Stadium	7,500	8th
Panionios	Athens (Nea Smyrni)	Nea Smyrni Stadium	11,700	13th
Panthrakikos	Komotini	Komotini Municipal Stadium	6,200	10th
PAOK	Thessaloniki	Toumba Stadium	28,703	2nd
PAS Giannina	Ioannina	Zosimades Stadium	7,500	11th
Platanias	Chania	Perivolia Municipal Stadium	3,700	14th
Skoda Xanthi	Xanthi	Skoda Xanthi Arena	7,244	16th
Veria	Veria	Veria Stadium	7,000	15th

=== Personnel and kits ===
Note: Flags indicate national team as has been defined under FIFA eligibility rules. Players and Managers may hold more than one non-FIFA nationality.

Team	Head coach	Captain	Kit manufacturer	Shirt sponsor
Asteras Tripolis	(Greece) Staikos Vergetis	(Spain) Fernando Usero	Nike	Lotto
Atromitos	(Greece) Nikos Nioplias	(Brazil) Luiz Brito	Macron	Tzoker
Ergotelis	(Greece) Giannis Taousianis	(Greece) Minas Pitsos	Eye Sportwear	Lotto
AEL Kalloni	(Greece) Vangelis Vlachos	(Greece) Giorgos Manousos	Adidas	Lotto
Kerkyra	(Greece) Michalis Grigoriou	(Greece) Tassos Venetis	Joma	Lotto
Levadiakos	(Greece) Apostolos Mantzios	(Greece) Thanasis Moulopoulos	Umbro	Lotto
OFI	(Greece) Nikos Anastopoulos	(Greece) Georgios Makris	Umbro	Pame Stoixima
Olympiacos	(Portugal) Vítor Pereira	(Greece) Giannis Maniatis	Puma	UNICEF
Niki Volos	(Greece) Panagiotis Tzanavaras	(Belgium) Jonas Ivens	Nike	Tzoker
Panathinaikos	(Greece) Yannis Anastasiou	(Portugal) Zeca	Adidas	Pame Stoixima
Panetolikos	(Greece) Makis Chavos	(Greece) Georgios Kousas	Tempo Sport	Tzoker
Panionios	(Greece) Marinos Ouzounidis	(Greece) Nikos Pantidos	Tempo Sport	Lotto
Panthrakikos	(Spain) José Manuel Roca	(Turkey) Deniz Baykara	Nike	Tzoker
PAOK	(Greece) Georgios Georgiadis	(Greece) Stefanos Athanasiadis	Nike	Pame Stoixima
PAS Giannina	(Greece) Giannis Petrakis	(Greece) Georgios Dasios	Nike	Tzoker
Platanias	(Greece) Georgios Paraschos	(Greece) Thomas Nazlidis	Macron	Tzoker
Skoda Xanthi	(Romania) Răzvan Lucescu	(Greece) Konstantinos Fliskas	Joma	Pame Stoixima
Veria	(Greece) Stefanos Gaitanos	(Greece) Alexandros Vergonis	Kappa	Tzoker

=== Managerial changes ===
Team	Outgoing manager	Manner of departure	Date of vacancy	Position in table	Incoming manager	Date of appointment
Ergotelis	(Spain) Juan Ferrando	Mutual consent	31 August 2014	16th	(Greece) Pavlos Dermitzakis	5 September 2014
Niki Volos	(Netherlands) Wiljan Vloet	Sacked	14 September 2014	18th	(Belgium) Sven Vandenbroeck	14 September 2014
Skoda Xanthi	(Greece) Sakis Tsiolis	Mutual consent	15 September 2014	14th	(Greece) Nikos Nentidis (caretaker)	16 September 2014
Atromitos	(Greece) Georgios Paraschos	Resigned	22 September 2014	7th	(Greece) Georgios Korakakis (caretaker)	22 September 2014
Atromitos	(Greece) Georgios Korakakis (caretaker)	End of tenure as caretaker	22 September 2014	7th	(Portugal) Ricardo Sá Pinto	24 September 2014
Skoda Xanthi	(Greece) Nikos Nentidis (caretaker)	End of tenure as caretaker	16 September 2014	11th	(Romania) Răzvan Lucescu	24 September 2014
Niki Volos	(Belgium) Sven Vandenbroeck	Sacked	1 October 2014	18th	(Greece) Panagiotis Tzanavaras	1 October 2014
Panthrakikos	(Greece) Apostolos Mantzios	Mutual consent	5 November 2014	16th	(Greece) Nikolaos Bacharidis (caretaker)	6 November 2014
Panthrakikos	(Greece) Nikolaos Bacharidis (caretaker)	End of tenure as caretaker	10 November 2014	17th	(Spain) José Manuel Roca	10 November 2014
Panionios	(Greece) Dimitrios Terezopoulos	Sacked	8 December 2014	15th	(Greece) Marinos Ouzounidis	9 December 2014
Ergotelis	(Greece) Pavlos Dermitzakis	Mutual consent	15 December 2014	17th	(Greece) Giannis Taousianis	16 December 2014
OFI	(Italy) Gennaro Gattuso	Resigned	30 December 2014	15th	(Greece) Nikos Anastopoulos	7 January 2015
Olympiacos	(Spain) Míchel	Sacked	6 January 2015	2nd	(Greece) Antonios Nikopolidis (caretaker)	6 January 2015
Olympiacos	(Greece) Antonios Nikopolidis (caretaker)	End of tenure as caretaker	6 January 2015	2nd	(Portugal) Vítor Pereira	7 January 2015
AEL Kalloni	(Greece) Ioannis Matzourakis	Sacked	15 January 2015	10th	(Greece) Vangelis Vlachos	16 January 2015
Atromitos	(Portugal) Ricardo Sá Pinto	Resigned	5 February 2015	7th	(Greece) Georgios Korakakis (caretaker)	5 February 2015
Atromitos	(Greece) Georgios Korakakis (caretaker)	End of tenure as caretaker	5 February 2015	9th	(Greece) Nikos Nioplias	9 February 2015
Levadiakos	(Greece) Savvas Pantelidis	Resigned	9 February 2015	14th	(Greece) Apostolos Mantzios	9 February 2015
Ergotelis	(Greece) Giannis Taousianis	Sacked	12 February 2015	16th	(Greece) Ioannis Matzourakis	12 February 2015
Ergotelis	(Greece) Ioannis Matzourakis	Resigned	25 February 2015	15th	(Greece) Giannis Taousianis	28 February 2015
Platanias	(Greece) Giannis Christopoulos	Resigned	11 March 2015	14th	(Greece) Giannis Thomaidis (caretaker)	11 March 2015
Platanias	(Greece) Giannis Thomaidis (caretaker)	End of tenure as caretaker	11 March 2015	15th	(Greece) Georgios Paraschos	15 March 2015
PAOK	(Greece) Angelos Anastasiadis	Sacked	16 March 2015	3rd	(Greece) Georgios Georgiadis	16 March 2015
Veria	(Spain) José Carlos Granero	Mutual consent	20 March 2015	11th	(Greece) Stefanos Gaitanos	20 March 2015

== Regular season ==
=== League table ===
Pos	Team	Pld	W	D	L	GF	GA	GD	Pts	Qualification or relegation
1	Olympiacos (C)	34	24	6	4	79	23	+56	78	Qualification for the Champions League group stage
2	Panathinaikos (Note: Panathinaikos were deducted 3 points due to extreme fan behavior.)	34	21	6	7	59	31	+28	66	Qualification for the Play-offs
3	PAOK	34	20	5	9	57	42	+15	65	Qualification for the Play-offs
4	Asteras Tripolis	34	17	8	9	52	37	+15	59	Qualification for the Play-offs
5	Atromitos	34	14	12	8	43	27	+16	54	Qualification for the Play-offs
6	PAS Giannina	34	13	14	7	47	33	+14	53	
7	Panetolikos	34	14	10	10	41	28	+13	52	
8	Skoda Xanthi	34	12	11	11	44	41	+3	47	
9	Platanias	34	12	8	14	32	30	+2	44 (Note: Head-to-head points: Platanias 4, Kalloni 1.)	
10	AEL Kalloni	34	11	11	12	34	39	−5	44	
11	Panthrakikos	34	11	10	13	35	44	−9	43 (Note: Head-to-head points: Panthrakikos 11, Panionios 10, Veria 8, Levadiakos 4.)	
12	Panionios	34	11	10	13	43	42	+1	43	
13	Veria	34	12	7	15	45	54	−9	43	
14	Levadiakos	34	12	7	15	41	34	+7	43	
15	Ergotelis (R)	34	8	8	18	35	60	−25	32	Relegation to Football League
16	OFI (Note: OFI were deducted 29 points in total. From those, 10 points due to failure to pay over former players' wages.) (R)	34	7	2	25	26	72	−46	−6 (Note: Head-to-head points: OFI 3, Niki Volos 0.)	Relegation to Gamma Ethniki
17	Niki Volos (Note: Niki Volos were deducted 13 points and have been disqualified from the League due to financial issues.) (R)	34	2	1	31	7	84	−77	−6	Relegation to Gamma Ethniki
18	Kerkyra (Note: Kerkyra relegated for illegal transfer of shares. Kerkyra was given the last position of the league table.) (R)	34	12	8	14	39	38	+1	44	Relegation to Football League

Source: Super League Greece
Rules for classification: 1) Points; 2) Head-to-head goal difference; 3) Head-to-head points; 4) Goals scored; 5) Play-offs (neutral ground).
(Note: Criteria 5 is only used if needed to decide champion, teams for relegation or teams for UEFA competitions). In any other case, the final standings of tied teams are determined with a public draw.
(C) Champions; (R) Relegated

=== Results ===
Home \ Away	AST	ATR	ERG	KAL	KER	LEV	NVL	OFI	OLY	PAO	PNE	PGSS	PNT	PAOK	PAS	PLA	XAN	VER
Asteras Tripolis		1–0	2–1	1–0	2–0	2–1	3–0 (Note: Opponents of Niki Volos awarded a 3–0 w/o win.)	6–1	0–0	1–1	1–1	2–0	2–1	3–0	2–2	1–0	2–1	2–0
Atromitos	4–3		1–1	0–0	2–1	1–0	3–0	3–0 (Note: Opponents of OFI awarded a 3–0 w/o win.)	1–0	2–0	0–0	3–1	2–0	4–0	1–1	1–0	2–0	0–0
Ergotelis	1–4	1–2		3–3	1–2	0–2	3–0	3–2	2–3	0–2	1–1	2–2	2–1	0–2	1–0	0–3	0–2	2–2
AEL Kalloni	1–0	1–1	2–0		1–0	0–0	3–0	3–0	0–5	1–0	0–0	1–0	2–0	1–2	1–0	0–0	2–2	4–1
Kerkyra	1–0	1–1	3–1	2–0		0–0	3–0	4–1	0–4	1–1	1–2	1–0	2–1	0–1	2–0	1–2	0–0	4–0
Levadiakos	3–1	2–1	1–1	3–0	2–3		3–0	3–0	1–2	1–1	0–0	1–0	1–1	1–2	1–2	0–0	1–2	0–2
Niki Volos	0–2	0–1	1–4	2–0	0–0	0–3		–	0–3	0–3	0–3	0–3	1–0	0–3	0–3	0–3	0–3	0–3
OFI	2–3	1–0	1–0	1–1	3–2	0–2	3–0		0–3	2–3	1–0	0–3	0–1	3–1	0–3	0–3	0–1	0–1
Olympiacos	2–0	2–1	3–0	5–0	3–0	4–0	3–1	3–0		1–0	2–0	2–0	5–1	1–2	2–2	2–1	2–0	3–0
Panathinaikos	2–2	2–0	5–0	1–0	2–0	1–0	1–0	1–2	2–1		1–0	2–1	4–0	4–3	3–1	3–0	2–0	2–1
Panetolikos	2–0	1–1	4–0	2–0	0–1	0–1	3–0	3–1	1–1	0–1		2–1	3–1	0–1	0–0	1–0	5–2	2–0
Panionios	2–1	2–2	2–1	0–2	0–0	1–0	2–1	2–0	2–2	1–1	3–0		2–1	0–0	0–1	0–0	1–1	4–2
Panthrakikos	1–1	1–1	0–0	3–2	1–0	1–0	3–0	0–0	1–3	2–1	0–0	1–0		3–1	1–1	1–0	2–0	1–1
PAOK	0–0	2–1	1–0	1–1	2–1	1–0	3–0	4–0	0–0	1–2	1–2	3–2	3–2		1–1	1–0	2–1	4–1
PAS Giannina	3–1	1–0	0–0	0–0	2–1	0–4	4–0	3–0	3–1	0–0	0–0	1–3	2–2	3–0		1–0	2–2	4–1
Platanias	0–1	0–0	1–2	1–0	1–1	1–3	3–1	1–0	1–1	2–3	2–0	3–0	2–0	0–4	0–0		1–0	1–0
Skoda Xanthi	0–0	1–0	0–1	2–1	0–0	2–0	2–0	2–1	1–3	4–2	3–0	1–1	0–0	4–2	1–1	0–0		2–2
Veria	4–0	1–1	0–1	1–1	2–1	2–1	2–0	4–1	0–2	1–0	1–3	2–2	0–1	1–3	2–0	2–0	3–2	

Source: Super League Greece
Legend: Blue = home team win; Yellow = draw; Red = away team win.

=== Positions by round ===
The table lists the positions of teams after each week of matches. In order to preserve chronological evolvements, any postponed matches are not included in the round at which they were originally scheduled, but added to the full round they were played immediately afterwards.

Team ╲ Round	1	2	3	4	5	6	7	8	9	10	11	12	13	14	15	16	17	18	19	20	21	22	23	24	25	26	27	28	29	30	31	32	33	34
Olympiacos	2	5	4	1	5	3	2	2	2	2	2	2	2	2	2	2	1	1	1	1	1	1	1	1	1	1	1	1	1	1	1	1	1	1
Panathinaikos	10	7	9	5	7	6	8	6	5	4	3	3	3	3	3	3	3	3	3	3	3	2	2	2	2	2	2	2	2	2	3	2	3	2
PAOK	11	3	2	2	1	1	1	1	1	1	1	1	1	1	1	1	2	2	2	2	2	3	3	3	3	3	3	3	3	3	2	3	2	3
Asteras Tripolis	13	9	10	9	8	7	5	5	7	6	4	4	4	4	4	4	4	4	4	4	4	4	4	5	4	4	4	4	4	4	4	4	4	4
Atromitos	6	2	5	7	4	8	6	8	6	5	7	6	9	8	9	9	8	8	7	7	7	7	9	8	7	8	7	7	8	8	6	6	6	5
PAS Giannina	3	6	7	11	12	10	11	11	9	8	8	9	7	7	8	8	7	7	9	9	6	6	6	6	7	6	6	5	5	5	5	5	5	6
Panetolikos	17	15	16	17	16	16	13	12	8	9	10	10	10	9	6	5	5	5	5	5	5	5	5	4	5	5	5	6	7	7	8	8	7	7
Skoda Xanthi	12	14	15	13	10	13	10	13	10	11	9	8	6	6	7	7	9	9	8	8	8	8	7	9	8	6	8	8	6	6	7	7	8	8
Platanias	18	18	11	14	15	12	9	10	11	10	13	14	11	12	11	12	11	11	11	12	12	14	12	13	14	14	15	15	15	15	15	14	10	9
AEL Kalloni	8	4	3	4	3	4	4	4	3	3	5	7	8	10	10	10	10	10	10	11	10	10	10	11	11	11	10	10	10	10	9	9	11	10
Panthrakikos	16	13	14	12	13	14	16	16	17	17	16	16	16	16	16	16	16	14	14	13	13	12	13	12	13	13	13	13	13	13	13	15	14	11
Panionios	5	10	6	8	9	11	14	14	14	13	15	15	14	14	13	15	15	15	15	15	15	15	15	14	12	12	12	12	12	12	12	12	13	12
Veria	1	1	1	3	2	2	3	3	4	7	6	5	5	5	5	6	6	6	6	6	9	9	8	7	9	10	11	11	11	11	11	11	12	13
Levadiakos	9	12	13	16	17	18	15	15	15	15	14	12	13	13	14	14	14	13	13	14	14	13	14	16	16	16	14	14	14	14	14	13	15	14
Ergotelis	14	16	17	15	14	15	17	17	16	16	17	17	17	17	17	17	17	17	17	16	16	16	16	15	15	15	16	16	16	16	16	16	16	15
OFI	7	11	12	10	11	9	12	9	13	14	12	13	15	15	15	13	13	16	16	17	17	17	17	17	17	17	17	17	17	17	17	17	17	16
Niki Volos	15	17	18	18	18	17	18	18	18	18	18	18	18	18	18	18	18	18	18	18	18	18	18	18	18	18	18	18	18	18	18	18	18	17
Kerkyra	4	8	8	6	6	5	7	7	12	12	11	11	12	11	12	11	12	12	12	10	11	11	11	10	10	9	9	9	9	9	10	10	9	18

Champion and Champions League group stage
Qualification for the play-offs
Relegation to 2015–16 Football League

Source: Super League Greece
Notes: The sixth round was played between the twelfth and the thirteenth rounds, the eleventh round was played between the seventeenth and the eighteenth rounds and the twenty-sixth round was played between the twenty-eighth and the twenty-ninth rounds.

== Play-offs ==
In the play-off for Champions League, the four qualified teams play each other in a home and away round robin. However, they do not all start with 0 points. Instead, a weighting system applies to the teams' standing at the start of the play-off mini-league. The team finishing fifth in the Super League will start the play-off with 0 points. The fifth placed team's end of season tally of points is subtracted from the sum of the points that other teams have. This number is then divided by five.

Pos	Team	Pld	W	D	L	GF	GA	GD	Pts	Qualification	PAO	AST	ATR	PAOK
2	Panathinaikos	6	4	1	1	9	2	+7	15	Qualification for the Champions League third qualifying round		0–0	2–0	2–0
3	Asteras Tripolis	6	2	3	1	2	4	−2	10	Qualification for the Europa League group stage	0–4		1–0	1–0
4	Atromitos	6	2	2	2	4	4	0	8	Qualification for the Europa League third qualifying round	2–0	0–0		1–1
5	PAOK	6	0	2	4	1	6	−5	4	Qualification for the Europa League second qualifying round	0–1	0–0	0–1	

Source: Super League Greece: Standings and Schedule
Rules for classification: 1) points; 2) head-to-head points; 3) head-to-head goal difference; 4) head-to-head away goals rule; 5) classification of regular season.

== Season statistics ==
Updated to games played on 10 May 2015

=== Top scorers ===
Rank	Player	Club	Goals
1	(Argentina) Jerónimo Barrales	Asteras Tripolis	17
2	(Greece) Kostas Mitroglou	Olympiacos	16
3	(Argentina) Alejandro Domínguez	Olympiacos	15
4	(Sweden) Marcus Berg	Panathinaikos	13
4	(Greece) Nikos Karelis	Panathinaikos	13
4	(Italy) Stefano Napoleoni	Atromitos	13
8	(Greece) Nikos Kaltsas	Veria	12

=== Top assists ===
Rank	Player	Club	Assists
1	(Argentina) Alejandro Domínguez	Olympiacos	11
2	(Serbia) Brana Ilić	PAS Giannina	10
2	(Argentina) Nicolás Martínez	Panetolikos	10
4	(Comoros) Ben Nabouhane	Veria	9
5	(Argentina) Martín Rolle	Asteras Tripolis	8

== Awards ==
=== MVP and Best Goal Awards ===
Matchday	MVP	Best Goal	Ref
1st	(Greece) Apostolos Giannou (Panionios)	(Albania) Vasil Shkurti (Niki Volos)	
2nd	(Greece) Giannis Skondras (PAOK)	(Greece) Nikolaos Kaltsas (AEL Kalloni)	
3rd	(Brazil) Leozinho (AEL Kalloni)	(Italy) Nicolao Dumitru (Veria)	
4th	(Switzerland) Pajtim Kasami (Olympiacos)	(Greece) Panagiotis Zorbas (Kerkyra)	
5th	(Romania) Răzvan Raț (PAOK)	(Colombia) Erik Moreno (Panetolikos)	
6th	(Greece) Dimitris Salpingidis (PAOK)	(Argentina) Facundo Pereyra (PAOK)	
7th	(Greece) Georgios Makris (OFI)	(Georgia (country)) Giorgi Merebashvili (OFI)	
8th	(Romania) Răzvan Raț (PAOK)	(Greece) Stefanos Athanasiadis (PAOK)	
9th	(Greece) Stefanos Athanasiadis (PAOK)	(Argentina) Javier Cámpora (Veria)	
10th	(Malta) Andrew Hogg (AEL Kalloni)	(Italy) Stefano Napoleoni (Atromitos)	
11th	(Sweden) Marcus Berg (Panathinaikos)	(Greece) Nikos Kaltsas (Veria)	
12th	(Argentina) Cristian Chávez (PAS Giannina)	(Argentina) Javier Umbides (Atromitos)	
13th	(Greece) Georgios Kantimiris (Veria)	(Greece) Evripidis Giakos (PAS Giannina)	
14th	(Albania) Ergys Kaçe (PAOK)	(Greece) Dimitris Kolovos (Panionios)	
15th	(Albania) Andi Lila (PAS Giannina)	(Romania) Dorin Goian (Asteras Tripolis)	
16th	(Argentina) Ariel Ibagaza (Panionios)	(Greece) Diamantis Chouchoumis (Panathinaikos)	
17th	(Greece) Georgios Athanasiadis (Panthrakikos)	(Greece) Nikos Kaltsas (Veria)	
18th	(Greece) Nikos Korovesis (PAS Giannina)	(Croatia) Mladen Petrić (Panathinaikos)	
19th	(France) Ben Nabouhane (Veria)	(Greece) Stefanos Athanasiadis (PAOK)	
20th	(Greece) Markos Vellidis (PAS Giannina)	(Argentina) Jerónimo Barrales (Asteras Tripolis)	
21st	(Brazil) André Alves (Panetolikos)	(Belgium) Victor Klonaridis (Panathinaikos)	
22nd	(Greece) Vasilios Koutsianikoulis (OFI)	(Greece) Anastasios Bakasetas (Panionios)	
23rd	(Greece) Stavros Tsoukalas (PAS Giannina)	(Georgia (country)) Giorgi Merebashvili (OFI)	
24th	(Argentina) Nicolás Martínez (Panetolikos)	(Greece) Manolis Moniakis (OFI)	
25th	(Greece) Vangelis Ikonomou (Panionios)	(Ecuador) Christian Noboa (PAOK)	
26th	(Argentina) Pitu García (Atromitos)	(Greece) Pantelis Kapetanos (Skoda Xanthi)	
27th	(Sweden) Marcus Berg (Panathinaikos)	(Greece) Pantelis Kapetanos (Skoda Xanthi)	
28th	(Greece) Markos Vellidis (PAS Giannina)	(Brazil) Marcelinho (Atromitos)	
29th	(Greece) Petros Giakoumakis (Levadiakos)	(France) Nicolas Diguiny (Panthrakikos)	
30th	(Serbia) Brana Ilić (PAS Giannina)	(Greece) Michalis Manias (PAS Giannina)	
31st	(Comoros) Ben Nabouhane (Veria)	(Albania) Ergys Kaçe (PAOK)	
32nd	(Argentina) Alejandro Domínguez (Olympiacos)	(Greece) Bruno Chalkiadakis (Ergotelis)	
33rd	(Belarus) Andrey Gorbunov (Atromitos)	(Paraguay) Jorge Benítez (Olympiacos)	
34th	(France) Kévin Olimpa (Platanias)	(Belgium) Victor Klonaridis (Panathinaikos)	

=== Annual awards ===
Annual awards were announced on 1 February 2016.

Award	Winner	Club
Greek Player of the Season	(Greece) Nikos Kaltsas	Atromitos
Foreign Player of the Season	(Argentina) Alejandro Domínguez	Olympiacos
Young Player of the Season	(Greece) Charis Charisis	PAS Giannina
Goalkeeper of the Season	(Greece) Markos Vellidis	PAS Giannina
Fair Play of the Season	(Greece) Christos Tasoulis	Panionios
Golden Boot	(Argentina) Jerónimo Barrales	Asteras Tripolis
Manager of the Season	(Greece) Giannis Petrakis	PAS Giannina

Team of the Season
Goalkeeper	(Greece) Markos Vellidis (PAS Giannina)			
Defence	(Norway) Omar Elabdellaoui (Olympiacos)	(Greece) Dimitrios Siovas (Olympiacos)	(Greece) Stathis Tavlaridis (Atromitos)	(France) Arthur Masuaku (Olympiacos)
Midfield	(Brazil) Cleyton (Skoda Xanthi)	(Greece) Zeca (Panathinaikos)	(Argentina) Alejandro Domínguez (Olympiacos)	(Argentina) Nicolas Martínez (Panetolikos)
Attack	(Greece) Nikos Karelis (Panathinaikos)		(Argentina) Jerónimo Barrales (Asteras Tripolis)	

== Attendances ==
=== Overall ===
Olympiacos drew the highest average home attendance in the 2014–15 edition of the Super League.

Pos	Team	Total	High	Low	Average	Change
1	Olympiacos (17)	292,754	31,250	12,012	19,113	+6.7%
2	PAOK (20)	147,658	26,140	3,574	10,527	−19.8%
3	Panathinaikos (20)	107,675	24,731	2,276	8,720	−3.9%
4	OFI	41,867	5,867	3,026	3,806	−11.0%
5	Panetolikos (17)	38,959	4,160	1,824	2,314	−17.5%
6	Asteras Tripolis (20)	25,331	5,011	772	2,174	+18.6%
7	PAS Giannina (17)	26,723	3,630	1,207	2,047	−1.1%
8	Xanthi (17)	26,193	6,558	884	1,094	−26.5%
9	Ergotelis (17)	22,516	3,188	977	1,501	−3.2%
10	Platanias (17)	22,146	3,025	1,095	1,820	−0.7%
11	Veria (17)	20,150	3,557	887	1,238	−20.1%
12	Atromitos (20)	17,516	3,054	630	1,217	−24.8%
13	Panthrakikos (17)	18,376	2,372	521	1,187	−35.8%
14	Niki Volos	6,699	2,867	336	1,117	n/a^{1}
15	AEL Kalloni (17)	14,505	2,419	837	1,289	+21.8%
16	Panionios (17)	17,104	3,054	638	1,252	+7.3%
17	Levadiakos (17)	16,004	2,276	713	804	−28.8%
18	Kerkyra (17)	13,866	2,042	702	924	n/a^{1}
	League total	936,713	31,250	336	3,456	−14.0%

Updated to games played on 7 June 2015
Source: Super League Greece
Notes:
1: Team played last season in the Football League.
2: Some matches were played behind closed doors.
3: Play-off matches are included.

=== Home matches played ===
Team \ Match played	Regular season																	Play-off			Total
Team \ Match played	1	2	3	4	5	6	7	8	9	10	11	12	13	14	15	16	17	1	2	3	Total
AEL Kalloni	1,856	1,020	671	837	2,357	444	329	1,059													14,505 (17)
Asteras Tripolis	1,606	1,942	3,857	2,449	1,383	1,709	1,418	920	1,087	1,642	1,517							2,536	1,622	2,462	31,951 (20)
Atromitos	630	1,716	2,762	1,009	833	1,027	653	867	—	—	—	1,152	1,059					1,417	780	1,130	20,843 (20)
Ergotelis	6,143	1,062	1,425	977	1,046	1,313	1,293	1,716	997	769											22,516 (17)
Kerkyra	733	1,620	702	887	658	877	1,492	848	608	551	732	1,808									13,866 (17)
Levadiakos	713	830	806	972	780	2,647	666	788	864	549	1,286										16,004 (17)
Niki Volos	2,738	1,538	336	985	751	351	663	—	—	—	—	—	—	—	—	—	—				6,699 (7)
OFI	4,390	4,191	3,650	3,967	2,912	3,513	3,291	—	—	—	—										41,867 (14)
Olympiacos	16,347	17,510	17,594	28,525	16,321	9,428	14,895	15,044	18,482	12,812											292,754 (17)
Panathinaikos	9,055	10,603	8,038	5,820	4,906	4,660	—	—	5,248									8,659	12,964	5,486	134,784 (20)
Panetolikos	4,352	3,627	2,224	2,391	2,750	2,065	1,824	2,379	3,164	2,298	2,182										38,959 (17)
Panionios	1,314	904	1,172	829	840	953	1,849	646	733	638											17,104 (17)
Panthrakikos	934	1,195	521	809	730	1,125	1,398	1,186	1,597	1,379											18,376 (17)
PAOK	—	9,116	7,430	7,626	7,661	13,823	6,936	—	—	6,234	7,355							9,137	9,473	4,618	170,886 (20)
PAS Giannina	1,499	1,424	1,207	1,380	1,263	1,385	935														26,723 (17)
Platanias	1,712	1,116	1,428	1,095	1,006	1,231	1,271	1,785	1,660												22,146 (17)
Veria	1,392	1,325	2,037	984	1,087	777	927	663	856	1,567	—	952									20,510 (17)
Xanthi	1,476	1,208	884	4,068	1,070	1,176	1,162	986	1,091	932											26,193 (17)
League total																					936,686

Source: Super League Greece
