= 2013–14 Olympiacos F.C. season =

Olympiacos
2013–14 season
- Chairman: Evangelos Marinakis
- Manager: Míchel
- Stadium: Karaiskakis Stadium, Piraeus
- Super League Greece: Champions
- Greek Cup: Semi-finals
- Champions League: Round of 16
- Top goalscorer: League: Kostas Mitroglou (14); All: Kostas Mitroglou (17)
- Highest home attendance: 27,189 vs PAOK (10 November 2013)
- Lowest home attendance: 15,523 vs Skoda Xanthi (14 September 2013)
- Average home league attendance: 17,909
| Home colours | Away colours | Third colours |

The 2013–14 season was Olympiacos's 55th consecutive season in the Super League Greece and their 88th year in existence. Olympiacos also participated in the Greek cup and 2013–14 UEFA Champions League group stage. The first game of the season took place at OAKA on 19 August against AEL Kalloni.

Olympiacos won the domestic title for the fourth year in a row, breaking the all-time record for the biggest point difference between the first and the second team in the regular season. The most memorable accomplishment of the year was arguably the 2–0 win over Manchester United in the first leg of the round of 16 of the Champions League, though not managing to defend that score in England.

At the domestic cup, Olympiacos was eliminated in the semifinals by PAOK 2–2 on aggregate, falling off of the away goals rule.

Olympiacos' top goalscorer for the season was striker Kostas Mitroglou, who moved to Fulham at the end of the January 2014 transfer window for a fee of approximately €15 million.

== Players ==
=== First-team squad ===
Squad at end of season

Note: Flags indicate national team as defined under FIFA eligibility rules; some limited exceptions apply. Players may hold more than one non-FIFA nationality.

| No. | Pos. | Nation | Player |
|---|---|---|---|
| 1 | GK | NIR | Roy Carroll |
| 2 | DF | GRE | Giannis Maniatis (vice-captain) |
| 3 | MF | POR | Pelé |
| 4 | DF | ESP | Miguel Torres |
| 5 | MF | POR | Paulo Machado |
| 6 | DF | GRE | Anastasios Papazoglou |
| 7 | MF | ARG | Ariel Ibagaza |
| 8 | MF | CGO | Delvin N'Dinga (on loan from Monaco) |
| 9 | FW | ARG | Javier Saviola |
| 10 | FW | ALG | Rafik Djebbour |
| 11 | FW | GRE | Kostas Mitroglou |
| 14 | MF | GRE | Andreas Samaris |
| 16 | GK | ESP | Roberto |
| 17 | MF | PAR | Hernán Pérez (on loan from Villarreal) |
| 18 | FW | PAR | Nelson Valdez (on loan from Al-Jazira) |
| 19 | MF | ESP | David Fuster |

| No. | Pos. | Nation | Player |
|---|---|---|---|
| 20 | DF | GRE | José Holebas |
| 21 | DF | GRE | Avraam Papadopoulos (captain) |
| 22 | DF | ALG | Carl Medjani |
| 23 | DF | GRE | Dimitris Siovas |
| 24 | DF | GRE | Kostas Manolas |
| 25 | DF | ESP | Iván Marcano (on loan from Rubin Kazan) |
| 26 | FW | CRC | Joel Campbell (on loan from Arsenal) |
| 28 | FW | GRE | Nikos Vergos |
| 30 | DF | BRA | Leandro Salino |
| 35 | MF | ARG | Alejandro Domínguez |
| 42 | GK | HUN | Balázs Megyeri |
| 44 | FW | SRB | Marko Šćepović |
| 60 | MF | MLI | Sambou Yatabaré |
| 79 | MF | SVK | Vladimír Weiss |
| 88 | DF | CMR | Gaëtan Bong |
| 99 | FW | NGR | Michael Olaitan |

=== Out on loan ===
Note: Flags indicate national team as defined under FIFA eligibility rules; some limited exceptions apply. Players may hold more than one non-FIFA nationality.

| No. | Pos. | Nation | Player |
|---|---|---|---|
| — | DF | GRE | Manolis Tzanakakis (at Ergotelis) |
| — | MF | GRE | Andreas Bouchalakis (at Ergotelis) |
| — | FW | GRE | Dimitrios Diamantakos (at Ergotelis) |
| — | MF | NOR | Abdisalam Ibrahim (at Ergotelis) |
| — | MF | SRB | Aleksandar Katai (at Platanias) |
| — | MF | GRE | Panagiotis Vlachodimos (at Platanias) |
| — | MF | GRE | Manolis Siopis (at Platanias) |
| — | DF | GRE | Vasilios Karagounis (at Aris) |
| — | MF | GRE | Andreas Tatos (at Aris) |
| — | DF | BRA | Leandro (at PAS Giannina) |
| — | MF | GRE | Charalambos Lykogiannis (at Levadiakos) |
| — | MF | GRE | Dimitris Kolovos (at Panionios) |

| No. | Pos. | Nation | Player |
|---|---|---|---|
| — | GK | GRE | Andreas Gianniotis (at Fostiras) |
| — | MF | ALB | Klodian Gino (at Fostiras) |
| — | DF | GRE | Konstantinos Rougalas (at Fostiras) |
| — | MF | GRE | Georgios Lyras (at Fostiras) |
| — | MF | GRE | Ioannis Paidakis (at Glyfada) |
| — | GK | GRE | Aris Vlachos (at Ermis Zoniana) |
| — | MF | GRE | Dimitrios Voutsiotis (at Ionikos) |
| — | MF | ARG | Tomás De Vincenti (at APOEL) |
| — | FW | GRE | Nikolaos Ioannidis (at Hansa Rostock) |
| — | DF | FRA | Claude Dielna (at Ajaccio) |
| — | MF | MLI | Sambou Yatabaré (at Bastia) |
| — | MF | MNE | Petar Grbić (at Partizan) |
| — | MF | SRB | Saša Zdjelar (at OFK Beograd) |
| — | MF | COL | Juan Pablo Pino (at Independiente Medellín) |

=== Olympiacos U20 squad ===
Olympiacos U20 is the youth team of Olympiacos. They participate in the Super League U20 championship and in UEFA Youth League competition. They play their home games at the 3,000-seater Renti Training Centre in Renti, Piraeus.

Note: Flags indicate national team as defined under FIFA eligibility rules; some limited exceptions apply. Players may hold more than one non-FIFA nationality.

| No. | Pos. | Nation | Player |
|---|---|---|---|
| — | GK | GRE | Eleftherios Choutetsiotis |
| — | GK | GRE | Michalis Iliadis |
| — | GK | GRE | Giorgos Strezos |
| — | DF | GRE | Anastasis Bougioukos |
| — | DF | GRE | Dimitris Gkoutsios |
| — | DF | GRE | Giorgos Makrostergios |
| — | DF | GRE | Giannis Sotirakos |
| — | DF | GRE | Argyris Toufas |
| — | DF | GRE | Konstantinos Vlachos |
| — | DF | GRE | Antonis Vatousiadis |
| — | DF | GRE | Praxitelis Vouros |
| — | DF | GRE | Panagiotis Volonakis |
| — | MF | SRB | Marko Janković |
| — | MF | ALB | Qazim Laci |

| No. | Pos. | Nation | Player |
|---|---|---|---|
| — | MF | GRE | Alexandros Margaritis |
| — | MF | GRE | Achilleas Nasiakopoulos |
| — | MF | GRE | Christoforos Pasalidis |
| — | MF | GRE | Antonis Papasavvas |
| — | MF | GRE | Nilos Psychogios |
| — | MF | GRE | Charalambos Rentzis |
| — | MF | GRE | Manolis Saliakas |
| — | MF | GRE | Dimitris Siopis |
| — | FW | GRE | Kostas Garefalakis |
| — | FW | GRE | Ilias Ignatidis |
| — | FW | GRE | Giorgos Kanavetas |
| — | FW | BIH | Boban Lazić |
| — | FW | GRE | Nikos Vergos |

== Pre-season and friendlies ==
Win Draw Loss

| 16 July 2013 Friendly | Simurq Zaqatala | 1–2 | Olympiacos | Schwaz |
| 18:00 | Zrnanović 46' | Report | Diamantakos 8'; Mitroglou 55' |

| 18 July 2013 Friendly | Freiburg | 4–2 | Olympiacos |
| | Mehmedi 4', 22'; Schmid 16'; Zuck 72' | | Tatos 48'; Olaitan 73' |

| 26 July 2013 Friendly | Stuttgart | 0–0 | Olympiacos |

| 28 July 2013 Friendly | 1899 Hoffenheim | 4–1 | Olympiacos |
| | Abraham 11'; Volland 33'; Schipplock 72'; Firmino 77' | | Diamantakos 90' |

| 3 August 2013 Friendly | Liverpool | 2–0 | Olympiacos | Liverpool, England |
| | Allen 24'; Henderson 63' | | | Stadium: Anfield |

| 7 August 2013 Friendly | Olympiacos | 1–0 | Anderlecht | Faliro, Greece |
| | Siovas 14' | | | Stadium: Karaiskakis Stadium |

| 10 August 2013 Friendly | Valencia | 2–1 | Olympiacos | Valencia, Spain |
| | Banega 5'; Postiga 41' | | Fuster 85' | Stadium: Mestalla |

== Competitions ==
=== Overview ===
| Competition | Started round | Current position / round | Final position / round | First match | Last match |
|---|---|---|---|---|---|
| Super League Greece | 1 | 1st | — | 19 August | 18 January |
| Greek Football Cup | Second Round | Fourth Round(QF) | — | 26 September | 22 January |
| Champions League | Group Stage | Second Round (R16) | | 17 September | 11 December |

Last updated: 25 January 2014

=== Super League Greece ===
==== League table ====
| Pos | Team | Pld | W | D | L | GF | GA | GD | Pts | Qualification or relegation |
|---|---|---|---|---|---|---|---|---|---|---|
| 1 | Olympiacos (C) | 34 | 28 | 2 | 4 | 88 | 19 | +69 | 86 | Qualification for the Champions League group stage |
| 2 | PAOK | 34 | 21 | 6 | 7 | 68 | 37 | +31 | 69 | Qualification for the Play-offs |
| 3 | Atromitos | 34 | 19 | 9 | 6 | 54 | 25 | +29 | 66 (Note: Head-to-head points: Atromitos 4, Panathinaikos 1.) | Qualification for the Play-offs |
| 4 | Panathinaikos | 34 | 20 | 6 | 8 | 57 | 28 | +29 | 66 | Qualification for the Play-offs |
| 5 | Asteras Tripolis | 34 | 16 | 10 | 8 | 46 | 35 | +11 | 58 | Qualification for the Play-offs |

Source: Super League Greece
Rules for classification: 1) Points; 2) Head-to-head points; 3) Head-to-head goal difference; 4) Goals scored; 5) Goals against; 6) Play-offs (neutral ground).
(Note: Criteria 6 is only used if needed to decide champion, teams for relegation or teams for UEFA competitions).
If in final league table there are still tied teams after applying criteria 1 to 5, a decision match (or matches if they are more than two) are to be played but only in three cases: to determine the champion, to fill spots in the play-off or to determine the teams to be relegated. In any other case, the final standings of tied teams are determined with a public draw.
(C) Champions

==== Results summary ====
| Overall | | | | | | | | Home | | | | | | Away | | | | | |
| Pld | W | D | L | GF | GA | GD | Pts | W | D | L | GF | GA | GD | W | D | L | GF | GA | GD |
|---|---|---|---|---|---|---|---|---|---|---|---|---|---|---|---|---|---|---|---|
| 34 | 28 | 2 | 4 | 88 | 19 | +69 | 86 | 16 | 0 | 1 | 47 | 10 | +37 | 12 | 2 | 3 | 41 | 9 | +32 |

Last updated: 13 April 2014.
Source: Competitive matches

==== Results by round ====
| Round | 1 | 2 | 3 | 4 | 5 | 6 | 7 | 8 | 9 | 10 | 11 | 12 | 13 | 14 | 15 | 16 | 17 | 18 | 19 | 20 | 21 | 22 | 23 | 24 | 25 | 26 | 27 | 28 | 29 | 30 | 31 | 32 | 33 | 34 |
|---|---|---|---|---|---|---|---|---|---|---|---|---|---|---|---|---|---|---|---|---|---|---|---|---|---|---|---|---|---|---|---|---|---|---|
| Ground | A | H | A | H | A | A | H | A | H | A | H | A | H | H | A | H | A | H | A | H | A | H | H | A | H | A | H | A | H | A | A | H | A | H |
| Result | W | W | W | W | D | W | W | W | W | W | W | W | W | W | W | W | W | W | D | W | W | W | W | W | W | W | L | L | W | W | L | W | L | W |
| Position | 3 | 1 | 1 | 1 | 1 | 1 | 1 | 1 | 1 | 1 | 1 | 1 | 1 | 1 | 1 | 1 | 1 | 1 | 1 | 1 | 1 | 1 | 1 | 1 | 1 | 1 | 1 | 1 | 1 | 1 | 1 | 1 | 1 | 1 |

A = Away; H = Home; W = Win; D = Draw; L = Loss

==== Matches ====
Win Draw Loss

| 19 August 2013 1 | AEL Kalloni | 0–1 | Olympiacos | Athens |
| 21:30 | | Report | Maniatis 61' | Stadium: Olympic Stadium; Attendance: 10,177; Referee: Konstantinos Ioannidis |

| 25 August 2013 2 | Olympiacos | 2–1 | Atromitos | Piraeus |
| 21:30 | Fuster 51'; Saviola 54' | Report | Napoleoni 47' | Stadium: Karaiskakis Stadium; Attendance: 18,109; Referee: Ilias Spathas |

| 1 September 2013 3 | Levadiakos | 0–5 | Olympiacos | Livadeia |
| 21:30 | | Report | Saviola 16' (pen.); Mitroglou 70', 89', 90+1'; Weiss 85' | Stadium: Levadia Municipal Stadium; Attendance: 2,175; Referee: Ioannis Topouzis |

| 14 September 2013 4 | Olympiacos | 4–0 | Skoda Xanthi | Piraeus |
| 20:30 | Saviola 4'; Mitroglou 27', 45', 73' | Report | | Stadium: Karaiskakis Stadium; Attendance: 15,523; Referee: Charalambos Kalogeropoulos |

| 22 September 2013 5 | Panetolikos | 0–0 | Olympiacos | Agrinio |
| 20:30 | | Report | | Stadium: Panetolikos Stadium; Attendance: 4,502; Referee: Anastasios Sidiropoulos |

| 28 September 2013 6 | Panionios | 0–2 | Olympiacos | Nea Smyrni |
| 20:30 | | Report | Weiss 61'; Saviola 75' | Stadium: Nea Smyrni Stadium; Attendance: 2,010; Referee: Michail Voskakis |

| 6 October 2013 7 | Olympiacos | 6–0 | Veria | Piraeus |
| 16:00 | Mitroglou 8', 20', 81'; Campbell 63', 82'; Maniatis 71' | Report | | Stadium: Karaiskakis Stadium; Attendance: 17,003; Referee: Ioannis Kampaxis |

| 19 October 2013 8 | Platanias | 1–4 | Olympiacos | Chania |
| 20:30 | Torres 2' | Report | Fernandes 66' (o.g.); Mitroglou 68'; Saviola 73'; Weiss 87' | Stadium: Chania, Crete; Attendance: 2,857; Referee: Apostolos Abarkiolis; Man of the Match: Alejandro Domínguez |

| 27 October 2013 9 | Olympiacos | 5–1 | OFI | Piraeus |
| 19:30 | Mitroglou 4', 52'; Holebas 58'; Maniatis 85'; Yatabaré 86' | Report | Lampropoulos 1' | Stadium: Karaiskakis Stadium; Attendance: 19,135; Referee: Georgios Liahoudis |

| 2 November 2013 10 | Panathinaikos | 0–1 | Olympiacos | Athens |
| 19:30 | | Report | Mitroglou 90' | Stadium: Leoforos Alexandras Stadium; Attendance: 15,009; Referee: Stavros Mandalos |

| 10 November 2013 11 | Olympiacos | 4–0 | PAOK | Piraeus |
| 19:00 | Mitroglou 36'; Saviola 60'; Fuster 74'; Campbell 80' | Report | | Stadium: Karaiskakis Stadium; Attendance: 27,189; Referee: Andreas Pappas; Man of the Match: Joel Campbell |

| 23 November 2013 12 | Panthrakikos | 1–4 | Olympiacos | Komotini |
| 19:30 | Igor 42' | Report | Manolas 21'; Campbell 53'; Samaris 58'; Saviola 88' | Stadium: Komotini Municipal Stadium; Attendance: 4,044; Referee: Christos Mitsios |

| 1 December 2013 13 | Olympiacos | 3–0 | Ergotelis | Piraeus |
| 19:00 | Campbell 3'; Olaitan 45+2'; Domínguez 62' | Report | | Stadium: Karaiskakis Stadium; Attendance: 14,495; Referee: Alexandros Dimitropoulos |

| 7 December 2013 14 | Olympiacos | 2–0 | Asteras Tripolis | Piraeus |
| 19:00 | Domínguez 74' (pen.); Olaitan 89' | Report | | Stadium: Karaiskakis Stadium; Attendance: 15,144; Referee: Haralambos Kalogeropoulos; Man of the Match: Alejandro Domínguez |

| 15 December 2013 15 | Aris | 0–2 | Olympiacos | Thessaloniki |
| | | Report | Domínguez 6'; Weiss 27' | Stadium: Kleanthis Vikelidis Stadium; Attendance: 7.692; Referee: Andreas Pappas |

| 18 December 2013 16 | Olympiacos | 3–2 | PAS Giannina | Piraeus |
| 19:00 | Saviola 21'; Machado 51' (pen.); Campbell 70' (pen.) | Report | Ilić 11'; Kritikos 87' | Stadium: Karaiskakis Stadium; Attendance: 15.453; Referee: Alexandros Aretopoulos |

| 21 December 2013 17 | Apollon Smyrnis | 0–5 | Olympiacos | Athens |
| 18:30 | | Report | Fuster 26'; Manolas 31'; Samaris 41'; Saviola 63', 80' | Stadium: Georgios Kamaras Stadium; Attendance: 3.333; Referee: Mihail Voskakis |

| 4 January 2014 18 | Olympiacos | 4–0 | AEL Kalloni | Piraeus |
| 19:00 | Saviola 13'; Domínguez 54'; Manolas 65'; Machado 75' | Report | | Stadium: Karaiskakis Stadium; Attendance: 15,152; Referee: Anastasios Papapetrou |

| 12 January 2014 19 | Atromitos | 0–0 | Olympiacos | Athens |
| 19:00 | | Report | | Stadium: Peristeri Stadium; Attendance: 3,937; Referee: Dimitrios Styliaras |

| 18 January 2014 20 | Olympiacos | 2–0 | Levadiakos | Piraeus |
| 17:15 | Olaitan 55'; Holebas 82' | Report | | Stadium: Karaiskakis Stadium; Attendance: 14,243; Referee: Stefanos Mantakis |

| 26 January 2014 21 | Skoda Xanthi | 0–2 | Olympiacos | Xanthi |
| 19:30 | | Report | Olaitan 24'; Ibagaza 89' | Stadium: Skoda Xanthi Arena; Attendance: 1,375; Referee: Alexandros Aretopoulos |

| 2 February 2014 22 | Olympiacos | 2–1 | Panetolikos | Piraeus |
| 15:00 | Olaitan 26'; Campbell 71' (pen.) | Report | Camara 5' | Stadium: Karaiskakis Stadium; Attendance: 12,756; Referee: Christos Mitsios |

| 5 February 2014 23 | Olympiacos | 2–0 | Panionios | Piraeus |
| 17:15 | Samaris 11'; Šćepović 18' | Report | | Stadium: Karaiskakis Stadium; Attendance: 11,527; Referee: Stavros Tritsonis |

| 8 February 2014 24 | Veria | 0–5 | Olympiacos | Veria |
| 19:30 | | Report | Domínguez 59'; Pérez 69'; Olaitan 70', 90+2'; Maniatis 85' | Stadium: Veria Municipal Stadium; Attendance: 2,282; Referee: Apostolos Abarkiolis |

| 15 February 2014 25 | Olympiacos | 4–2 | Platanias | Piraeus |
| 19:30 | Olaitan 28'; Valdez 68'; Pérez 70'; Marcano 78' | Report | Torres 37'; Vlachodimos 72' | Stadium: Karaiskakis Stadium; Attendance: 14,435; Referee: Stavros Tritsonis |

| 22 February 2014 26 | OFI | 0–4 | Olympiacos | Heraklion |
| 19:30 | | Report | Machado 39'; Šćepović 42', 52', 88' | Attendance: 5,755; Referee: Konstantinos Ioannidis |

| 2 March 2014 27 | Olympiacos | 0–3 | Panathinaikos | Piraeus |
| 19:30 | | Report | Pranjić 45'; Berg 67'; Abeid 89' | Stadium: Karaiskakis Stadium; Attendance: 32,082; Referee: Anastasios Sidiropoulos |

| 9 March 2014 28 | PAOK | 2–1 | Olympiacos | Thessaloniki |
| 19:30 | Athanasiadis 36'; Tzavellas 84' | Report | Samaris 33' | Stadium: Toumba Stadium; Attendance: 23,344; Referee: Anastasios Kakos |

| 15 March 2014 29 | Olympiacos | 2–0 | Panthrakikos | Piraeus |
| 19:30 | Valdez 35'; Fuster 90' (pen.) | Report | | Stadium: Karaiskakis Stadium; Attendance: 0 Referee: Georgios Kyzas |

| 23 March 2014 30 | Ergotelis | 1–4 | Olympiacos | Heraklion |
| 19:30 | Ibrahim 55' | Report | Valdez 3', 9', 13'; Campbell 32' (pen.) | Attendance: 3,067; Referee: Christos Mitsios |

| 26 March 2014 31 | Asteras Tripolis | 2–1 | Olympiacos | Tripoli |
| 19:30 | De Blasis 22'; Carrasco 90+3' | Report | Vergos 60' | Attendance: 2,495; Referee: Andreas Pappas |

| 30 March 2014 32 | Olympiacos | 1–0 | Aris | Piraeus |
| 19:30 | Valdez 84' | Report | | Stadium: Karaiskakis Stadium; Attendance: 12,187; Referee: Ioannis Deflakis |

| 6 April 2014 33 | PAS Giannina | 2–0 | Olympiacos | Ioannina |
| 19:30 | Michail 1'; Vila 14' | Report | | Stadium: Zosimades Stadium; Attendance: 2,789; Referee: Anastasios Papapetrou |

| 13 April 2014 34 | Olympiacos | 1–0 | Apollon Smyrnis | Piraeus |
| 19:30 | Saviola 88' | Summary | | Stadium: Karaiskakis Stadium; Attendance: 32,161; Referee: Anastasios Sidiropoulos |

=== Greek Football Cup ===
==== Second round ====
| 25 September 2013 First leg | Olympiacos | 5–1 | Fokikos | Piraeus |
| 18:00 | Campbell 4'; Yatabaré 8'; Šćepović 52', 81'; Olaitan 63' | Report | Frangos 56' | Stadium: Karaiskakis Stadium; Referee: Aristeidis Vatsios (West Attica) |

| 30 October 2013 Second leg | Fokikos | 3–5 (4–10 agg.) | Olympiacos | Amfissa |
| 20:30 | Frangos 9'; Randy 51'; Álvarez 76' | Report | Fuster 16'; Weiss 23'; Olaitan 25'; N'Dinga 33'; Papasavas 86' | Stadium: Amfissa Municipal Stadium; Referee: Anastasios Papapetrou (Athens) |

==== Third round ====
| 8 January 2014 First leg | Olympiacos | 4–0 | Asteras Tripolis | Piraeus |
| 20:00 | Domínguez 17' (pen.); Campbell 35'; Bong 56'; Olaitan 60' | Report | | Stadium: Karaiskakis Stadium; Referee: Stavros Mantalos (Athens) |

| 22 January 2014 Second leg | Asteras Tripolis | 0–1 (0–5 agg.) | Olympiacos | Tripoli |
| 20:00 | | Report | Šćepović 79' | Stadium: Theodoros Kolokotronis Stadium; Referee: Anastasios Sidiropoulos (Dodecanese) |

==== Quarter-finals ====
| 29 January 2014 First leg | Olympiacos | 0–0 | Atromitos | Piraeus |
| 20:00 | | Report | | Stadium: Karaiskakis Stadium; Referee: Andreas Pappas (Athens) |

| 12 February 2014 Second leg | Atromitos | 1–1 (1–1a agg.) | Olympiacos | Athens |
| 20:00 | Tavlaridis 42' | Report | Domínguez 56' (pen.) | Stadium: Peristeri Stadium; Referee: Stavros Mantalos (Kavala) |

==== Semi-finals ====
| 2 April 2014 First leg | Olympiacos | 2–1 | PAOK | Piraeus |
| | Domínguez 8'; Fuster 10' | Report | Athanasiadis 31' | Stadium: Karaiskakis Stadium; Referee: Christos Kalogeropoulos (Athens) |

| 16 April 2014 Second leg | PAOK | 1–0 (2–2a agg.) | Olympiacos | Thessaloniki |
| | Athanasiadis 47' | Report | | Stadium: Toumba Stadium; Attendance: 28,703; Referee: Stavros Mantalos (Athens) |

=== UEFA Champions League ===
==== Group stage ====
| Pos | Team | Pld | W | D | L | GF | GA | GD | Pts | Qualification | PAR | OLY | BEN | AND |
|---|---|---|---|---|---|---|---|---|---|---|---|---|---|---|
| 1 | (France) Paris Saint-Germain | 6 | 4 | 1 | 1 | 16 | 5 | +11 | 13 | Advance to knockout phase | — | 2–1 | 3–0 | 1–1 |
| 2 | (Greece) Olympiacos | 6 | 3 | 1 | 2 | 10 | 8 | +2 | 10 (Note: Head-to-head points: Olympiacos 4, Benfica 1.) | Advance to knockout phase | 1–4 | — | 1–0 | 3–1 |
| 3 | (Portugal) Benfica | 6 | 3 | 1 | 2 | 8 | 8 | 0 | 10 | Transfer to Europa League | 2–1 | 1–1 | — | 2–0 |
| 4 | (Belgium) Anderlecht | 6 | 0 | 1 | 5 | 4 | 17 | −13 | 1 | | 0–5 | 0–3 | 2–3 | — |

Source: UEFA
Notes:

| 17 September 2013 1 | Olympiacos (Greece) | 1–4 | (France) Paris Saint-Germain | Piraeus, Greece |
| 20:45 CEST | Weiss 25'; Bong (yellow card) 30' | Report | Cavani 19'; Motta 68', 73'; Marquinhos 86'; Van der Wiel (yellow card) 87' | Stadium: Karaiskakis Stadium; Attendance: 31,253; Referee: Felix Brych (Germany); Man of the Match: Thiago Motta |

| 2 October 2013 2 | Anderlecht (Belgium) | 0–3 | (Greece) Olympiacos | Anderlecht, Belgium |
| 20:45 CEST | N'Sakala (yellow card) 45'; Bruno (yellow card) 51' | Report | Mitroglou 17', 56', 72'; Samaris (yellow card) 24'; Maniatis (yellow card) 28'; Manolas (yellow card) 36' | Stadium: Constant Vanden Stock Stadium; Attendance: 15,918; Referee: Tom Harald Hagen (Norway); Man of the Match: Kostas Mitroglou |

| 23 October 2013 3 | Benfica (Portugal) | 1−1 | (Greece) Olympiacos | Lisbon, Portugal |
| 20:45 CEST | Pérez (yellow card) 55'; Gaitán (yellow card) 62'; Cardozo 83' | Report | Domínguez 29'; Fuster (yellow card) 36'; Weiss (yellow card) 42'; Mitroglou (yellow card) 59'; Maniatis (yellow card) 84' | Stadium: Estádio da Luz; Attendance: 38,149; Referee: Alberto Undiano Mallenco (Spain); Man of the Match: Kostas Mitroglou |

| 5 November 2013 4 | Olympiacos (Greece) | 1−0 | (Portugal) Benfica | Piraeus, Greece |
| 20:45 CET | Manolas 13'; Yatabaré (yellow card) 38'; Roberto (yellow card) 85'; N'Dinga (yellow card) 89'; Domínguez (yellow card) 90+2' | Report | Pereira (yellow card) 33'; Matić (yellow card) 37'; Amorim (yellow card) 42' | Stadium: Karaiskakis Stadium; Attendance: 31,461; Referee: Damir Skomina (Slovenia); Man of the Match: Roberto |

| 27 November 2013 5 | Paris Saint-Germain (France) | 2–1 | (Greece) Olympiacos | Paris, France |
| 20:45 CET | Ibrahimović 7'; Verratti (yellow card) 29' (yellow-red card) 46'; Van der Wiel (yellow card) 66'; Matuidi (yellow card) 67'; Cavani (yellow card) 87', (goal) 90' | Report | Manolas (yellow card) 49', (goal) 80'; Domínguez (yellow card) 67'; Weiss (yellow card) 71'; Maniatis (yellow card) 82' | Stadium: Parc des Princes; Attendance: 44,466; Referee: Craig Thomson (Scotland); Man of the Match: Zlatan Ibrahimović |

| 10 December 2013 6 | Olympiacos (Greece) | 3–1 | (Belgium) Anderlecht | Piraeus, Greece |
| 20:45 CET | Saviola 33', 58'; Fuster (yellow card) 52'; Domínguez 90+5' (pen.) | Report | Kouyaté (yellow card) 7' (yellow-red card) 49'; Milivojević (yellow card) 21'; Kljestan 39', (yellow card) 65'; Mitrović (yellow card) 64'; N'Sakala (yellow card) 71' (yellow-red card) 88'; Proto (red card) 90+3' | Stadium: Karaiskakis Stadium; Attendance: 31,444; Referee: Wolfgang Stark (Germany); Man of the Match: Javier Saviola |

==== Knockout phase ====
===== Round of 16 =====
| 25 February 2014 First leg | Olympiacos (Greece) | 2–0 | (England) Manchester United | Piraeus, Greece |
| 20:45 CEST | Domínguez 38'; Campbell 55' | Report | Evra (yellow card) 3'; Ferdinand (yellow card) 90' | Stadium: Karaiskakis Stadium; Attendance: 29,815; Referee: Gianluca Rocchi (Italy); Man of the Match: Alejandro Domínguez |

| 19 March 2014 Second leg | Manchester United (England) | 3–0 (3–2 agg.) | (Greece) Olympiacos | Manchester, England |
| 20:45 CEST | Carrick (yellow card) 10'; Van Persie 25' (pen.), 45+1', 52'; Evra (yellow card) 61'; Ferdinand (yellow card) 90+1' | Report | Manolas (yellow card) 6'; Domínguez (yellow card) 10'; Salino (yellow card) 62'; Marcano (yellow card) 90+1' | Stadium: Old Trafford; Attendance: 74,662; Referee: Björn Kuipers (Netherlands); Man of the Match: Robin van Persie |

== Statistics ==
=== Goal scorers ===
| No. | Pos. | Nation | Name | Super League Greece | UEFA Champions League | Greek Cup | Total |
|---|---|---|---|---|---|---|---|
| 11 | FW | (Greece) | Kostas Mitroglou | 14 | 3 | 0 | 17 |
| 7 | FW | (Argentina) | Javier Saviola | 11 | 2 | 0 | 13 |
| 26 | MF | (Costa Rica) | Joel Campbell | 6 | 0 | 2 | 8 |
| 79 | MF | (Slovakia) | Vladimír Weiss | 4 | 1 | 1 | 6 |
| 35 | MF | (Argentina) | Alejandro Domínguez | 4 | 2 | 1 | 7 |
| 99 | MF | (Nigeria) | Michael Olaitan | 4 | 0 | 4 | 6 |
| 2 | MF | (Greece) | Giannis Maniatis | 3 | 0 | 0 | 3 |
| 19 | MF | (Spain) | David Fuster | 3 | 0 | 1 | 4 |
| 24 | DF | (Greece) | Kostas Manolas | 3 | 2 | 0 | 5 |
| 44 | FW | (Serbia) | Marko Šćepović | 1 | 0 | 3 | 3 |
| 10 | MF | (Argentina) | Ariel Ibagaza | 1 | 0 | 0 | 1 |
| 60 | MF | (Mali) | Sambou Yatabaré | 1 | 0 | 1 | 2 |
| 20 | DF | (Greece) | José Holebas | 2 | 0 | 0 | 2 |
| 14 | MF | (Greece) | Andreas Samaris | 3 | 0 | 0 | 3 |
| 8 | MF | (Republic of the Congo) | Delvin N'Dinga | 0 | 0 | 1 | 1 |
| - | MF | (Greece) | Antonis Papasavvas | 0 | 0 | 1 | 1 |
| 5 | MF | (Portugal) | Paulo Machado | 2 | 0 | 0 | 2 |
| - | - | - | Opponent's own Goals | 1 | 0 | 0 | 1 |
| TOTAL | | | | 63 | 10 | 15 | 88 |

Last updated: 24 November 2013

=== Starting 11 ===
| No. | Pos. | Nat. | Name | MS | Notes |
|---|---|---|---|---|---|
| 16 | GK | (Spain) | Roberto | 26 | |
| 30 | RB | (Brazil) | Salino | 15 | Miguel Torres has 4 starts |
| 24 | CB | (Greece) | Manolas | 20 | |
| 21 | CB | (Greece) | Papadopoulos | 13 | Siovas has 11 starts |
| 20 | LB | (Greece) | Holebas | 15 | Bong has 11 starts |
| 2 | DM | (Greece) | Maniatis | 15 | N'Dinga has 8 starts |
| 14 | DM | (Greece) | Samaris | 22 | |
| 9 | ST | (Argentina) | Saviola | 19 | Domínguez has 13 starts |
| 26 | RW | (Costa Rica) | Campbell | 19 | |
| 19 | LW | (Spain) | Fuster | 13 | |
| 11 | ST | (Greece) | Mitroglou | 18 | |

Source: Squad stats and Start formations.
Only competitive matches.
Using the most used start formation.
Ordered by position on pitch (from back right to front left).

== Individual Awards ==
| Name | Pos. | Award |
|---|---|---|
| (Spain) Roberto | Goalkeeper | Super League Greece Goalkeeper the Season; Super League Greece Team of the Season |
| (Argentina) Alejandro Domínguez | Attacking Midfielder | Super League Greece Team of the Season |
| (Costa Rica) Joel Campbell | Winger | Super League Greece Team of the Season |
