= Georgios Lanaris =

Greek footballer

Personal information
- Full name: Georgios Lanaris
- Date of birth: 26 June 1979 (age 47)
- Place of birth: Veria, Greece
- Height: 1.71 m (5 ft 7 1/2 in)
- Position: Forward

Youth career
- 1990–1998: Pontioi Veria

Senior career*
Years	Team	Apps	(Gls)
1998–2000	Iraklis	0	(0)
1998–1999	→ Poseidon Nea Michaniona (loan)	4	(0)
2000–2001	Naoussa	31	(2)
2001–2008	Veria	96	(31)
2008–2009	Apollon Kalamarias	4	(0)
2009	Aetos Skydra	0	(0)
2009–2010	Pierikos	2	(0)
2010–2012	Veria	44	(5)
- * Club domestic league appearances and goals as of 4 September 2015

Georgios Lanaris (Greek: Γεώργιος Λαναρής; born 26 June 1979) is a Greek former footballer best known for his time with his hometown club Veria as a forward.

== Club career ==
=== Pontioi Veria ===
Lanaris loved football from a very young age. Despite his parents insisting he focus on his school subjects, Lanaris followed a football career. At age eleven he joined Pontioi Veria where his coach Giorgos Kykeridis, later technical director of Veria, spotted him and focused Lanaris's progress. At the time Kykeridis stated, "This kid knows how to play football; he can go far as a player, and he's got a left foot that is rare for our sport." Lanaris soon became a recognizable talent in the Imathia region.

=== Iraklis ===
In the summer of 1998, Iraklis approached Lanaris and, after coming to an agreement with Pontioi, signed them to their club. This was the first professional contract for Lanaris in his career. The same summer he was given on loan for a year to Poseidon Nea Michaniona to provide him some experience.

Iraklis loaned Lanaris to Poseidon for a season. Despite his talent, he wasn't able to secure a regular spot and ended up only making four appearances, scoring no goals. At the end of the 1998–1999 season he returned to Iraklis but wasn't able to make the main squad due to the presence of established talent such as Savvas Kofidis and Ieroklis Stoltidis. As a result he was released on a free transfer in summer of 2000.

=== Naoussa ===
In summer of 2000, Lanaris was approached by Naoussa. He signed with the club and in his first season he played thirty-two games, scoring twice.

=== Veria ===
After his promising season with Naoussa, Lanaris was approached by Veria, and he agreed to move to the club on a free transfer in summer of 2001. His first two seasons saw no appearances for Veria in Delta Ethniki, but the team managed to secure promotion to Gamma Ethniki and win the Amateur Cup against Preveza. As the club began play in Gamma Ethniki the following season, Lanaris was able to earn a spot on the main squad and played in thirty-three games, scoring seven times, and helped the club avoid relegation. The next season, 2004–2005, would be the best of Lanaris's career. He played in thirty matches and he scored seventeen goals, leading Veria's return to Football League as Gamma Ethniki champions.

In his first season in Football League, he played twenty-five times and he scored eight goals. The following season, 2006–2007, Lenaris lost his main squad role after a dispute with Giorgos Arvanitidis, then-president and owner of the club. As a result he played in only eight matches that season, but the club was still able to achieve promotion to Super League.

After Veria's promotion to Super League, Lanaris decided to sign a contract to Apollon Kalamarias as he considered himself a free agent. However, Arvanitidis disagreed and claimed Lanaris had signed a "1 plus 1" contract, binding him to the club for the following season. The case went to the Hellenic Football Federation court where Veria won the case and Lanaris was forced to return.

In Super League, Lanaris made no appearances as the dispute with club ownership caused him to permanently lose his spot on the team. He was released by the club on 30 June 2008 as his contract expired.

=== Apollon Kalamaria ===
Apollon Kalamaria had just been relegated to Football League along with Veria and Atromitos, and team manager Makis Katsavakis was still eager to sign the newly available Lanaris. Upon Lanaris's release by Veria, Katsavakis quickly signed the footballer to a contract, but unfortunately Lanaris did not impress at Kalamaria and was released during the 2008 winter transfer window after playing in only four matches.

=== Aetos Skydra ===
The new year would find Lanaris joining Aetos Skydras. He failed to make any appearances for the club and he was released on a free transfer in the summer of 2009.

=== Pierikos ===
Lanaris joined Pierikos for the season 2009–2010 but he only played in two matches. He was released on another free transfer during the 2010 winter transfer window.

=== Return to Veria ===
As he reached the age of thirty-two, Lanaris had few options. After resolving his issue with Arvanitidis, Lanaris returned home to Veria, who was back in Gamma Ethniki for the 2009–2010 season. There he finally returned to form and regained his spot in the main squad, scoring five times in fourteen appearances and helping to lead Veria to the Gamma Ethniki championship and promotion to Football League.

In the season that followed, Lanaris played another thirteen matches in Football League as the club was saved from relegation. The 2011–2012 season would be his last as a football player, but he left on a high note as he made seventeen appearances to help lead Veria to a second-place finish and a return to Super League. It would be Lanaris's final act as a player for the club to which he had dedicated his life back in 2004.

=== Team manager ===
After retiring from football in summer of 2012, Arvanitidis named Lanaris as team manager on 7 July 2012. Lanaris attempted to resign from the post on 27 January 2013 claiming personal reasons, but his resignation was not accepted.

== 2015 Greek football scandal ==
In 2015, Lanaris and Veria owner Giorgos Arvanitidis were accused of fixing a match between Veria and Olympiacos on 6 January 2013. Veria player Nikolaos Georgeas and then-manager Dimitris Kalaitzidis both testified in March 2015 that Lanaris, following Arvanitidis's orders, instructed the players to lose the match by a 3–0 score, which was ultimately the final tally.

Lanaris was immediately banned from any football activity, forced to leave his team manager position at Veria, and was barred from leaving the country. However, the HFF appeals committee overturned that ruling and found Arvanitidis, Lanaris, and Veria not guilty of the accusations. Finally, he was acquitted on all counts by the Court.

== Honours ==
=== Veria F.C. ===
- Football League (Greece): 2
  - Runner-up: 2011–12
  - Third place: 2006–07
- Gamma Ethniki: 2
  - Winner (2): 2004–05, 2009–10
