= 2013–14 Super League Greece =

78th season of top-tier football league in Greece

Super League Greece
- Season: 2013–14
- Dates: 17 August 2013 – 13 April 2014
- Champions: Olympiacos; 41st Greek title
- Relegated: Apollon Smyrnis; Aris
- Champions League: Olympiacos; Panathinaikos
- Europa League: PAOK; Asteras Tripolis; Atromitos
- Matches: 306
- Goals: 776 (2.54 per match)
- Top goalscorer: Esteban Solari (16 goals)
- Biggest home win: Platanias 7–0 AEL Kalloni
- Biggest away win: Levadiakos 0–5 Olympiacos
- Highest scoring: Veria 4–3 Levadiakos; AEL Kalloni 2–5 PAOK; Levadiakos 4–3 Aris; Platanias 7–0 AEL Kalloni

The 2013–14 Super League Greece was the 78th season of the highest football league of Greece and the eighth under the name Super League. The season began on 17 August and ended in May 2014. Olympiacos are the champions, having won their 41st Greek championship.

The league comprises fourteen teams from the 2012–13 season and four promoted teams from the 2012–13 Football League.

== Teams ==
Two teams were relegated from the 2013–14 season. Kerkyra would compete in the 2013–14 Football League after 3 years in the top level, while AEK Athens faced first relegation in their 89-year history and would compete in the 2013–14 Football League 2.

Four teams were promoted from the 2012–13 Football League. The champions, Apollon Smyrnis, the runners-up Ergotelis, the third placed AEL Kalloni and the winners of the promotion play-offs, Panetolikos. Apollon returned to top level 13 years after relegation, Ergotelis made their immediate come back, while AEL Kalloni made their debut in it. Panetolikos also made their immediate come back.

Promoted from 2012–13 Football League	Relegated from 2012–13 Super League Greece
Apollon Smyrnis; Ergotelis; AEL Kalloni; Panetolikos	AEK Athens; Kerkyra

=== Stadiums and locations ===
Location of the 2013–14 Super League Greece teams

Club	Location	Venue	Capacity	2012–13
AEL Kalloni	Mytilene	Mytilene Municipal Stadium	4,000	3rd (FL)
Apollon Smyrnis	Athens (Rizoupoli)	Georgios Kamaras Stadium	14,856	1st (FL)
Aris	Thessaloniki (Charilaou)	Kleanthis Vikelidis Stadium	22,800	13rd
Asteras Tripolis	Tripoli	Theodoros Kolokotronis Stadium	7,616	3rd
Atromitos	Athens (Peristeri)	Peristeri Stadium	10,200	4th
Ergotelis	Heraklion (Ammoudara)	Pankritio Stadium	25,780	2nd (FL)
Levadiakos	Livadeia	Levadia Municipal Stadium	6,500	11th
OFI	Heraklion (Kaminia)	Theodoros Vardinogiannis Stadium	9,088	14th
Olympiacos	Piraeus	Karaiskakis Stadium	32,115	1st
Panathinaikos	Athens (Ampelokipoi)	Leoforos Alexandras Stadium	16,118	6th
Panetolikos	Agrinio	Panetolikos Stadium	6,500	4th (FL)
Panionios	Athens (Nea Smyrni)	Nea Smyrni Stadium	11,700	8th
Panthrakikos	Komotini	Komotini Municipal Stadium	6,198	10th
PAOK	Thessaloniki (Toumba)	Toumba Stadium	28,703	2nd
PAS Giannina	Ioannina	Zosimades Stadium	7,652	5th
Platanias	Chania	Perivolia Municipal Stadium	4,000	9th
Skoda Xanthi	Xanthi	Skoda Xanthi Arena	7,361	7th
Veria	Veria	Veria Stadium	7,000	12th

=== Personnel and kits ===
Note: Flags indicate national team as has been defined under FIFA eligibility rules. Players and Managers may hold more than one non-FIFA nationality.

Team	Head coach	Captain	Kit manufacturer	Shirt sponsor
AEL Kalloni	(Greece) Giannis Matzourakis	(Greece) Michalis Kripintiris	Nike	Joker
Apollon Smyrnis	(Northern Ireland) Lawrie Sanchez	(Greece) Dimitrios Diamantis	Nike	Filoi tou Paidiou
Aris	(Greece) Giorgos Foiros	(Spain) Rubén Pulido	Under Armour	Joker
Asteras Tripolis	(Greece) Staikos Vergetis	(Spain) Fernando Usero	Nike	Lotto
Atromitos	(Greece) Georgios Paraschos	(Greece) Evangelos Nastos	Hummel	Lotto
Ergotelis	(Greece) Marinos Ouzounidis	(Argentina) Diego Romano	Eye Sportwear	Lotto
Levadiakos	(Greece) Savvas Pantelidis	(Greece) Thanasis Moulopoulos	Umbro	Extra 5
OFI	(Portugal) Ricardo Sá Pinto	(Argentina) Ricardo Matias Verón	Legea	Races
Olympiacos	(Spain) Míchel	(Greece) Avraam Papadopoulos	Puma	UNICEF
Panathinaikos	(Greece) Giannis Anastasiou	(Portugal) Zeca	Adidas	OPAP
Panetolikos	(Greece) Makis Chavos	(Greece) Georgios Kousas	Umbro	Lotto
Panionios	(Greece) Nikos Anastopoulos	(France) Sakis Dione	Tempo Sport	Joker
Panthrakikos	(Greece) Akis Mantzios	(Greece) Achilleas Sarakatsanos	Nike	Lotto
PAOK	(Greece) Georgios Georgiadis	(Greece) Dimitris Salpingidis	Nike	Pame Stoixima
PAS Giannina	(Greece) Giannis Petrakis	(Greece) Georgios Dasios	Nike	Joker
Platanias	(Greece) Angelos Anastasiadis	(Greece) Thomas Nazlidis	Macron	Joker
Skoda Xanthi	(Greece) Nikos Kechagias	(Greece) Spyros Vallas	Nike	Super 3
Veria	(Serbia) Ratko Dostanić	(Greece) Nikolaos Georgiadis	Kappa	Lotto

=== Managerial changes ===
Team	Outgoing manager	Manner of departure	Date of vacancy	Position in table	Incoming manager	Date of appointment
Veria	(Serbia) Goran Stevanović	Resigned	27 August 2013	4th	(Greece) Stefanos Gaitanos	27 August 2013
Veria	(Greece) Stefanos Gaitanos (caretaker)	Manager arrival	1 September 2013	4th	(Netherlands) Ton Caanen	1 September 2013
Aris	(Greece) Giannis Chatzinikolaou	Sacked	3 September 2013	18th	(Serbia) Zoran Milinković	9 September 2013
Skoda Xanthi	(Greece) Nikos Karageorgiou	Resigned	14 September 2013	14th	(Greece) Nikos Kechagias	16 September 2013
Skoda Xanthi	(Greece) Nikos Kechagias (caretaker)	Manager arrival	23 September 2013	10th	(Germany) Reiner Maurer	24 September 2013
Veria	(Netherlands) Ton Caanen	Sacked	29 September 2013	14th	(Greece) Stefanos Gaitanos	30 September 2013
Asteras Tripolis	(Greece) Sakis Tsiolis	Sacked	30 September 2013	6th	(Greece) Staikos Vergetis	1 October 2013
Veria	(Greece) Stefanos Gaitanos (caretaker)	Manager arrival	7 October 2013	15th	(Romania) Ștefan Stoica	8 October 2013
Apollon Smyrnis	(Greece) Alekos Vosniadis	Resigned	8 October 2013	13th	(Greece) Babis Tennes	11 October 2013
OFI	(Greece) Pavlos Dermitzakis	Sacked	8 October 2013	17th	(Portugal) Ricardo Sá Pinto	17 October 2013
Levadiakos	(Greece) Takis Lemonis	Resigned	14 October 2013	12th	(Greece) Dimitris Farantos	15 October 2013
Levadiakos	(Greece) Dimitris Farantos (caretaker)	Manager arrival	22 October 2013	14th	(Greece) Nikos Karageorgiou	22 October 2013
Veria	(Romania) Ștefan Stoica	Sacked	31 October 2013	17th	(Greece) Stefanos Gaitanos	1 November 2013
PAS Giannina	(Greece) Savvas Pantelidis	Sacked	31 October 2013	11th	(Greece) Giorgos Georgoulopoulos	1 November 2013
PAS Giannina	(Greece) G. Georgoulopoulos (caretaker)	Manager arrival	4 November 2013	9th	(Greece) Sakis Tsiolis	4 November 2013
Platanias	(Greece) Marinos Ouzounidis	Mutual Consent	4 November 2013	16th	(Greece) Nikos Anastopoulos	6 November 2013
Veria	(Greece) Stefanos Gaitanos (caretaker)	Manager arrival	16 November 2013	18th	(Serbia) Ratko Dostanić	16 November 2013
Apollon Smyrnis	(Greece) Babis Tennes	Sacked	11 November 2013	16th	(Northern Ireland) Lawrie Sanchez	17 November 2013
Panionios	(Greece) Nikos Pantelis	Sacked	16 December 2013	14th	(Greece) Konstantinos Panagopoulos	16 December 2013
Aris	(Serbia) Zoran Milinković	Mutual Consent	20 December 2013	18th	(Greece) Soulis Papadopoulos	20 December 2013
Ergotelis	(Greece) Giannis Petrakis	Mutual Consent	13 January 2014	14th	(Greece) Marinos Ouzounidis	17 January 2014
PAS Giannina	(Greece) Sakis Tsiolis	Mutual Consent	22 January 2014	12th	(Greece) G. Georgoulopoulos (caretaker)	22 January 2014
PAS Giannina	(Greece) G. Georgoulopoulos (caretaker)	Manager arrival	28 January 2014	13th	(Greece) Giannis Petrakis	28 January 2014
Skoda Xanthi	(Germany) Reiner Maurer	Sacked	5 February 2014	11th	(Greece) Nikos Kehagias	5 February 2014
Platanias	(Greece) Nikos Anastopoulos	Mutual Consent	8 February 2014	16th	(Greece) Angelos Anastasiadis	9 February 2014
Levadiakos	(Greece) Nikos Karageorgiou	Mutual Consent	11 February 2014	14th	(Greece) Savvas Pantelidis	12 February 2014
Panionios	(Greece) Konstantinos Panagopoulos	Sacked	15 February 2014	15th	(Greece) Antonis Manikas (caretaker)	15 February 2014
Panionios	(Greece) Antonis Manikas (caretaker)	Manager arrival	17 February 2014	14th	(Greece) Nikos Anastopoulos	17 February 2014
PAOK	(Netherlands) Huub Stevens	Sacked	2 March 2014	2nd	(Greece) Georgios Georgiadis	2 March 2014
Aris	(Greece) Soulis Papadopoulos	Resigned	26 March 2014	18th	(Greece) Georgios Firos	26 March 2014

== Regular season ==
=== League table ===
Pos	Team	Pld	W	D	L	GF	GA	GD	Pts	Qualification or relegation
1	Olympiacos (C)	34	28	2	4	88	19	+69	86	Qualification for the Champions League group stage
2	PAOK	34	21	6	7	68	37	+31	69	Qualification for the Play-offs
3	Atromitos	34	19	9	6	54	25	+29	66 (Note: Head-to-head points: Atromitos 4, Panathinaikos 1.)	Qualification for the Play-offs
4	Panathinaikos	34	20	6	8	57	28	+29	66	Qualification for the Play-offs
5	Asteras Tripolis	34	16	10	8	46	35	+11	58	Qualification for the Play-offs
6	OFI	34	11	11	12	30	39	−9	44 (Note: Head-to-head points: OFI 4, Ergotelis 1.)	
7	Ergotelis	34	11	11	12	39	40	−1	44	
8	Panetolikos	34	11	9	14	32	33	−1	42 (Note: Head-to-head points (goal difference): Levadiakos 3 (0), Panetolikos 3 (0).)	
9	Levadiakos	34	13	3	18	42	61	−19	42	
10	Panthrakikos	34	11	8	15	39	52	−13	41 (Note: Head-to-head points: Panthrakikos 4, PAS Giannina 1.)	
11	PAS Giannina	34	12	5	17	34	43	−9	41	
12	AEL Kalloni	34	12	3	19	31	62	−31	39 (Note: Head-to-head points: AEL Kalloni 4, Panionios 1.)	
13	Panionios	34	10	9	15	33	42	−9	39	
14	Platanias	34	10	8	16	39	48	−9	38 (Note: Head-to-head points: Platanias 8, Veria 5, Skoda Xanthi 3.)	
15	Veria	34	9	11	14	31	51	−20	38	
16	Skoda Xanthi	34	11	5	18	44	54	−10	38	Qualification for the Relegation play-off
17	Apollon Smyrnis (R)	34	9	9	16	43	54	−11	36	Relegation to Football League
18	Aris (R)	34	3	13	18	26	53	−27	22	Relegation to Gamma Ethniki (Note: Aris withdrew from the Football League due to financial reasons, hence they were relegated to Gamma Ethniki for the 14/15 season.)

Source: Super League Greece
Rules for classification: 1) Points; 2) Head-to-head points; 3) Head-to-head goal difference; 4) Goals scored; 5) Goals against; 6) Play-offs (neutral ground).
(Note: Criteria 6 is only used if needed to decide champion, teams for relegation or teams for UEFA competitions).
If in final league table there are still tied teams after applying criteria 1 to 5, a decision match (or matches if they are more than two) are to be played but only in three cases: to determine the champion, to fill spots in the play-off or to determine the teams to be relegated. In any other case, the final standings of tied teams are determined with a public draw.
(C) Champions; (R) Relegated

=== Results ===
Home \ Away	APS	ARIS	AST	ATR	ERG	KAL	LEV	OFI	OLY	PAO	PNE	PGSS	PNT	PAOK	PAS	PLA	XAN	VER
Apollon Smyrnis		2–1	1–2	2–3	1–0	1–3	4–2	0–1	0–5	1–1	1–1	1–2	3–2	3–3	4–0	3–1	2–0	0–0
Aris	0–2		1–1	0–0	0–2	0–2	1–1	0–0	0–2	0–2	0–0	1–0	2–2	1–1	0–0	1–2	1–1	0–0
Asteras Tripolis	2–0	2–2		2–2	2–3	2–0	2–0	0–0	2–1	1–0	3–0	1–0	1–0	2–1	3–3	3–0	2–2	0–0
Atromitos	2–0	2–0	3–1		2–2	2–0	3–0	3–0	0–0	0–0	1–1	4–0	3–1	1–1	1–0	3–0	2–0	1–0
Ergotelis	2–2	3–3	0–1	0–1		3–0	2–0	0–1	1–4	0–2	0–1	1–1	3–1	2–2	1–0	3–1	2–2	2–0
AEL Kalloni	0–0	3–1	0–2	0–1	0–0		1–0	1–0	0–1	0–4	3–1	3–2	2–0	2–5	1–0	1–0	1–5	0–3
Levadiakos	1–1	4–3	3–1	1–0	2–0	1–0		2–1	0–5	0–4	2–1	2–0	2–2	3–2	1–0	2–0	2–0	2–0
OFI	2–0	2–0	1–1	2–0	1–1	3–1	1–0		0–4	1–1	2–1	0–0	1–0	1–1	1–1	0–0	3–2	0–1
Olympiacos	1–0	1–0	2–0	2–1	3–0	4–0	2–0	5–1		0–3	2–1	2–0	2–0	4–0	3–2	4–2	4–0	6–0
Panathinaikos	3–1	4–1	2–1	1–2	1–1	3–0	3–1	1–0	0–1		2–0	1–0	1–2	2–1	3–1	1–0	2–1	1–1
Panetolikos	2–1	0–0	0–1	1–3	0–0	4–0	2–1	1–0	0–0	1–0		0–0	3–1	2–0	2–0	3–0	1–0	0–0
Panionios	2–1	1–2	3–0	2–1	0–1	1–1	4–2	0–0	0–2	3–0	1–1		1–1	2–0	2–0	0–0	0–0	2–1
Panthrakikos	2–3	2–1	1–1	1–3	2–1	2–0	1–0	1–1	1–4	0–2	2–1	4–1		0–3	2–0	1–0	2–1	1–0
PAOK	0–0	3–1	2–0	2–0	2–1	2–1	3–0	5–0	2–1	2–1	1–0	4–1	3–0		2–1	1–0	3–0	4–1
PAS Giannina	2–0	2–1	0–2	1–0	2–0	1–2	2–1	2–1	2–0	0–1	1–0	0–1	1–1	0–2		1–0	2–1	0–1
Platanias	2–0	2–1	1–1	1–1	0–1	7–0	2–0	0–2	1–4	1–1	1–0	1–0	1–1	2–1	1–2		3–0	2–2
Skoda Xanthi	3–2	2–0	0–1	0–2	0–0	1–0	4–1	2–1	0–2	3–1	3–1	2–0	1–0	1–2	0–3	2–3		3–0
Veria	1–1	0–1	1–0	1–1	0–1	0–3	4–3	2–0	0–5	1–3	1–0	2–1	0–0	1–2	2–2	2–2	3–2	

Source: Super League Greece
Legend: Blue = home team win; Yellow = draw; Red = away team win.

=== Positions by round ===
The table lists the positions of teams after each week of matches. In order to preserve chronological evolvements, any postponed matches are not included in the round at which they were originally scheduled, but added to the full round they were played immediately afterwards.

Team ╲ Round	1	2	3	4	5	6	7	8	9	10	11	12	13	14	15	16	17	18	19	20	21	22	23	24	25	26	27	28	29	30	31	32	33	34
Olympiacos	3	1	1	1	1	1	1	1	1	1	1	1	1	1	1	1	1	1	1	1	1	1	1	1	1	1	1	1	1	1	1	1	1	1
PAOK	1	6	2	2	2	2	2	2	2	2	2	2	2	2	2	2	2	2	2	2	2	2	2	2	2	2	2	2	2	2	2	2	2	2
Atromitos	7	14	7	12	7	4	4	3	3	3	3	3	3	3	3	3	3	3	3	3	3	3	3	3	3	3	3	3	3	3	3	3	4	3
Panathinaikos	4	8	8	7	5	3	5	7	4	5	4	4	5	4	5	4	4	4	4	4	4	4	5	4	4	4	4	4	4	4	4	4	3	4
Asteras Tripolis	5	12	4	5	3	7	6	8	6	4	8	5	4	5	4	5	5	5	5	5	5	5	4	5	5	5	5	5	5	5	5	5	5	5
OFI	8	15	16	16	17	17	17	16	17	14	15	14	12	14	8	12	8	10	10	8	8	8	9	9	8	8	7	8	6	7	6	6	6	6
Ergotelis	9	2	5	6	8	5	3	4	5	6	5	7	8	7	9	11	11	12	14	13	15	12	10	10	10	11	11	12	10	12	8	7	7	7
Panetolikos	16	9	15	13	12	12	10	9	7	7	6	8	9	8	10	7	9	6	7	6	6	7	7	8	6	6	8	9	7	8	9	8	10	8
Levadiakos	10	16	17	17	13	15	12	14	15	13	14	12	14	11	13	14	15	16	15	15	12	14	13	14	13	12	14	10	12	9	11	10	11	9
Panthrakikos	11	17	9	8	6	8	7	5	8	8	11	13	13	9	11	8	10	7	6	7	7	6	6	6	7	7	9	6	8	6	7	9	8	10
PAS Giannina	12	3	10	4	9	6	8	10	11	9	7	9	10	12	7	9	7	9	9	12	13	9	8	7	9	9	6	7	9	10	10	12	9	11
AEL Kalloni	17	10	3	3	4	9	11	11	12	11	9	6	6	10	12	13	13	14	11	9	9	10	11	11	11	10	10	11	13	11	12	13	12	12
Panionios	13	4	11	9	11	13	14	12	10	12	10	11	11	13	14	10	12	11	12	11	11	13	14	15	14	13	13	14	11	14	13	11	13	13
Platanias	6	13	13	11	15	14	15	17	13	15	13	15	15	15	15	15	14	13	16	16	16	15	16	16	16	16	16	17	16	16	15	15	14	14
Veria	14	5	6	10	14	16	18	18	18	18	18	18	16	18	17	17	17	17	17	17	17	17	17	17	17	17	17	16	17	17	16	17	16	15
Skoda Xanthi	18	11	12	14	10	10	9	6	9	10	12	10	7	6	6	6	6	8	8	10	10	11	12	12	12	14	12	13	14	13	14	14	17	16
Apollon Smyrnis	2	7	14	15	16	11	13	15	16	16	16	16	17	16	16	16	16	15	13	14	14	16	15	13	15	15	15	15	15	15	17	16	15	17
Aris	15	18	18	18	18	18	18	16	13	14	17	17	17	18	17	18	18	18	18	18	18	18	18	18	18	18	18	18	18	18	18	18	18	18

Champion and Champions League group stage
Qualification for the play-offs
Qualification for the relegation play-offs
Relegation to 2014–15 Football League

Source: Super League Greece

== Play-offs ==
In the play-off for Champions League, the four qualified teams play each other in a home and away round robin. However, they do not all start with 0 points. Instead, a weighting system applies to the teams' standing at the start of the play-off mini-league. The team finishing fifth in the Super League will start the play-off with 0 points. The fifth placed team's end of season tally of points is subtracted from the sum of the points that other teams have. This number is then divided by five. PAOK then suffered a penalty of three points because of a riot at a cup game with Olympiakos.

Pos	Team	Pld	W	D	L	GF	GA	GD	Pts	Qualification	PAO	PAOK	ATR	AST
2	Panathinaikos	6	2	3	1	7	5	+2	11	Qualification for the Champions League third qualifying round (Note: Panathinaikos won the 2013–14 Greek Football Cup against PAOK, so all of the Europa League berths are reverted into play-off positions.)		1–1	1–1	1–0
3	PAOK	6	3	2	1	8	4	+4	10	Qualification for the Europa League play-off round	1–0		3–0	1–1
4	Atromitos	6	1	2	3	6	9	−3	7 (Note: Head-to-head record: Asteras Tripolis–Atromitos 1–0, Atromitos–Asteras Tripolis 3–1.)	Qualification for the Europa League third qualifying round	1–1	1–2		3–1
5	Asteras Tripolis	6	2	1	3	5	8	−3	7	Qualification for the Europa League second qualifying round	1–3	1–0	1–0	

Source: Super League Greece: Standings and Schedule
Rules for classification: 1) points; 2) head-to-head points; 3) head-to-head goal difference; 4) away goals rule; 5) classification of regular season

== Play-off Match ==
The game took place in Kleanthis Vikelidis Stadium on 11 June 2014.

11 June 2014
20:30 (EEST)

Olympiacos Volos	1–2	Skoda Xanthi
Gurma 34'	Report	Goutas 45+3'; Ranos 82'

Kleanthis Vikelidis Stadium, Thessaloniki
Attendance: 3,500
Referee: Anastasios Sidiropoulos (Dodecanese)

Skoda Xanthi retained their spot in 2014–15 Super League; Olympiacos Volos remained in 2014–15 Football League.

== Season statistics ==
Updated to games played on 13 April 2014.

=== Top scorers ===
Rank	Player	Club	Goals
1	(Argentina) Esteban Solari	Skoda Xanthi	16
2	(Comoros) Ben Nabouhane	Veria	15
2	(Sweden) Marcus Berg	Panathinaikos	15
3	(Greece) Dimitrios Papadopoulos	Atromitos	14
3	(Greece) Kostas Mitroglou	Olympiacos	14
4	(Greece) Christos Aravidis	Panionios	12
4	(Greece) Vangelis Mantzios	Levadiakos	12
4	(Greece) Antonis Petropoulos	Apollon Smyrnis	12
4	(Argentina) Javier Saviola	Olympiacos	12

=== Top assists ===
Rank	Player	Club	Assists
1	(Argentina) Alejandro Domínguez	Olympiacos	11
1	(Argentina) Javier Umbides	Atromitos	11
3	(Costa Rica) Joel Campbell	Olympiacos	9
3	(Spain) Lucas Pérez	PAOK	9
3	(Greece) Andreas Tatos	Aris	9
6	(Spain) Armiche	Levadiakos	8
7	(Sweden) Marcus Berg	Panathinaikos	7
7	(Argentina) Pablo De Blasis	Asteras Tripolis	7
7	(Spain) José María Cases	Panthrakikos	7
7	(Spain) David Fuster	Olympiacos	7
7	(Greece) Nikos Karelis	Panathinaikos	7
7	(Brazil) Leozinho	AEL Kalloni	7
7	(Brazil) Lino	PAOK	7

== Awards ==
=== MVP and Best Goal Awards ===
Matchday	MVP	Best Goal	Ref
1st	(Spain) Lucas Pérez (PAOK)	(Argentina) Cristian Chávez (PAS Giannina)	
2nd	(Greece) Dimitris Kolovos (Panionios)	(Argentina) Cristian Chávez (PAS Giannina)	
3rd	(Cyprus) Antonis Georgallides (Platanias)	(Slovakia) Miroslav Stoch (PAOK)	
4th	(Greece) Stavros Tsoukalas (PAS Giannina)	(Brazil) Igor (Panthrakikos)	
5th	(Greece) Georgios Kousas (Panetolikos)	(Serbia) Zvonimir Vukić (PAOK)	
6th	(Greece) Iosif Daskalakis (OFI)	(Sweden) Marcus Berg (Panathinaikos)	
7th	(Greece) Kostas Mitroglou (Olympiacos)	(Nigeria) Chigozie Udoji (Aris)	
8th	(Argentina) Esteban Solari (Skoda Xanthi)	(Greece) Dimitrios Diamantakos (Ergotelis)	
9th	(Spain) Lucas Pérez (PAOK)	(Argentina) Pablo de Blasis (Asteras Tripolis)	
10th	(Greece) Vasilios Koutsianikoulis (OFI)	(Brazil) Leozinho (AEL Kalloni)	
11th	(Cameroon) André Bikey (Panetolikos)	(Spain) Carlos Calvo (Skoda Xanthi)	
12th	(Spain) Lucas Pérez (PAOK)	(Greece) Giorgos Theodoridis (Panetolikos)	
13th	(Greece) Thanasis Papazoglou (OFI)	(Spain) José María Cases (Panthrakikos)	
14th	(Greece) Alexandros Tzorvas (Apollon Smyrnis)	(Portugal) Pelé (Ergotelis)	
15th	(Argentina) Matías Iglesias (Atromitos)	(Lebanon) Sekou Oliseh (PAOK)	
16th	(Greece) Christos Aravidis (Panionios)	(Senegal) Henri Camara (Panetolikos)	
17th	(Algeria) Mehdi Abeid (Panathinaikos)	(Senegal) Henri Camara (Panetolikos)	
18th	(Greece) Kostas Katsouranis (PAOK)	(Senegal) Henri Camara (Panetolikos)	
19th	(Spain) José María Cases (Panthrakikos)	(Greece) Giorgos Manousos (AEL Kalloni)	
20th	(Brazil) Zé Eduardo (OFI)	(Greece) Giorgos Theodoridis (Panetolikos)	
21st	(Greece) Ilias Kotsios (Levadiakos)	(Greece) Christos Tzanis (Panthrakikos)	
22nd	(Greece) Georgios Athanasiadis (Panthrakikos)	(Italy) Stefano Napoleoni (Atromitos)	
23rd	(Greece) Nikos Korovesis (PAS Giannina)	(Israel) Bibras Natcho (PAOK)	
24th	(Argentina) Pitu García (Atromitos)	(Brazil) Dudu Cearense (OFI)	
25th	(Greece) Markos Dounis (Panionios)	(Brazil) Dudu Cearense (OFI)	
26th	(Greece) Georgios Kantimiris (Veria)	(Greece) Michalis Manias (Aris)	
27th	(Sweden) Marcus Berg (Panathinaikos)	(Greece) Dimitris Salpingidis (PAOK)	
28th	(Sweden) Marcus Berg (Panathinaikos)	(Israel) Asael Ben Shabat (Panthrakikos)	
29th	(Greece) Thanasis Papazoglou (OFI)	(Nigeria) Abdul Jeleel Ajagun (Panathinaikos)	
30th	(Sweden) Marcus Berg (Panathinaikos)	(Slovakia) Miroslav Stoch (PAOK)	
31st	(Argentina) Pablo de Blasis (Asteras Tripolis)	(Spain) Lucas Pérez (PAOK)	
32nd	(Greece) Apostolos Giannou (Panionios)	(Greece) Efthymis Koulouris (PAOK)	
33rd	(Israel) Bibras Natcho (PAOK)	(Guinea-Bissau) Esmaël Gonçalves (Veria)	
34th	(Argentina) Javier Umbides (Atromitos)		

=== Annual awards ===
Annual awards were announced on 3 February 2015.

Award	Winner	Club
Greek Player of the Season	(Greece) Dimitrios Papadopoulos	Atromitos
Foreign Player of the Season	(Sweden) Marcus Berg	Panathinaikos
Young Player of the Season	(Greece) Dimitris Kolovos	Panionios
Goalkeeper of the Season	(Spain) Roberto Jimenez	Olympiacos
Golden Boot	(Argentina) Esteban Solari	Skoda Xanthi
Manager of the Season	(Greece) Giannis Anastasiou	Panathinaikos

Team of the Season
Goalkeeper	(Spain) Roberto Jiménez (Olympiacos)			
Defence	(Brazil) Rodrigo Galo (Panetolikos)	(Greece) Nikolaos Lazaridis (Atromitos)	(Greece) Stathis Tavlaridis (Atromitos)	(Spain) Nano (Panathinaikos)
Midfield	(Costa Rica) Joel Campbell (Olympiacos)	(Spain) Fernando Usero (Asteras Tripolis)	(Argentina) Alejandro Domínguez (Olympiacos)	(Argentina) Javier Umbides (Atromitos)
Attack	(Greece) Dimitrios Papadopoulos (Atromitos)		(Sweden) Marcus Berg (Panathinaikos)	

== Attendances ==
Olympiacos drew the highest average home attendance in the 2013–14 edition of the Super League Greece.

Rank	Team	Games	Total attendance	Average attendance
1	Olympiacos	16	286,547	17,909
2	PAOK	17	223,126	13,125
3	Panathinaikos	16	145,197	9,075
4	Aris	17	123,192	7,247
5	OFI	17	72,724	4,278
6	Panetolikos	16	44,902	2,806
7	PAS Giannina	17	35,197	2,070
8	Panthrakikos	17	31,447	1,850
9	Asteras Tripolis	17	31,161	1,833
10	Platanias	17	31,147	1,832
11	Atromitos	17	27,503	1,618
12	Apollon Smyrnis	17	26,528	1,560
13	Veria	17	26,355	1,550
14	Ergotelis	17	26,345	1,550
15	Skoda Xanthi	17	25,296	1,488
16	Panionios	17	19,846	1,167
17	Levadiakos	17	19,212	1,130
18	AEL Kalloni	17	17,992	1,058
