= Dimitris Kalaitzidis =

Greek professional football manager (born 1957)

Personal information
- Full name: Dimitrios Kalaitzidis
- Date of birth: 20 January 1957 (age 69)
- Place of birth: Serres, Greece

Managerial career
- Years: Team
- 1996–1997: Ampelokipi
- 1997–1998: Levadiakos
- 1998–1999: Apollon Krya Vrysi
- 1999–2000: Poseidon Michaniona
- 2000: Leonidio
- 2002: Panetolikos
- 2004: ILTEX Lykoi
- 2004–2005: Veria
- 2005: Doxa Drama
- 2006: Diagoras
- 2006: Panthrakikos
- 2007: Veria
- 2007–2008: Ethnikos Asteras
- 2008: Makedonikos
- 2009–2010: Kerkyra (assistant)
- 2011–2012: Veria
- 2012–2013: Veria
- 2013–2014: Nea Salamis
- 2014: Aris
- 2015: Aris
- 2016–2023: Apollon Kalamarias
- 2023–2024: Apollon Kalamarias (assistant)
- 2024–2025: Panachaiki
- 2026: Athens Kallithea

Dimitris Kalaitzidis (Greek: Δημήτρης Καλαϊτζίδης; born 20 January 1957) is a Greek professional football manager.

== Managerial career ==
Kalaitzidis started his managerial career in 1996 as he was appointed manager of Ampelokipoi F.C. Through his career he managed sixteen different clubs. He spent most of his career being the manager of Veria F.C.

=== First steps ===
Kalaitzidis began his managerial career when he was hired as the head coach of Ampelokoipoi F.C.. He later joined Levadiakos F.C. but he did not remain with the club for a long time. After being fired by Levadiakos, he joined Apollonas Kria Vrisi F.C., where he stayed for a season. After, Apollonas it was Poseidon N.Mixaniona F.C. who trusted the young coach. Kalaitzidis stayed in Chalkidi for a year. In 2000, he joined Leonidio F.C. but the team's poor performance led him to the exit. His first professional job came when Panetolikos F.C., who was participating in Gamma Ethniki, offered Kalaitzidis a contract. Kalaitzidis joined the club and he remained only for few months. After taking a two-year break, Kalaitzidis returned to the football pitches as he joined ILTEX Lykoi F.C.. He left from the club on 22 December 2004 as he accepted the contract offered by Gamma Ethniki club Veria F.C., a decision that changed his whole career.

=== Veria ===
As manager of Veria, Kalaitzidis is considered as Veria's all-time most successful manager and he is a fan favorite. His first appointment as manager of Veria took place on 22 November 2004. During his first spell in Veria, Kalaitzidis won his first career promotion from Football League 2 to Football League as Veria was named the champion of North Group. That promotion would find Veria returning to Football League after four seasons. On 4 October 2005 due to some poor results, Kalaitzidis was fired by Giorgos Arvanitidis. Kalaitzidis returned again to Veria on 9 January 2007. Kalaitzidis's return changed Veria's overall performance radically and that resulted in Veria finishing third in 2006–07 championship and winning the promotion to Super League, after eight seasons. At the end of the season, Kalaitzidis's contract was extended for another year, though Veria's poor start in Super League resulted in Kalaitzidis being fired again.

=== Ethnikos Asteras, Makedonikos and Kerkyra ===
After being fired from Veria, Kalaitzidis took over Ethnikos Asteras, who was playing in Football league, bench but he was fired again after three months as the results of the club were not the expected. On 1 July 2008, he was appointed as Makedonikos' manager but he left the club on 22 December of the same year. On 4 July 2010, Kalaitzidis joined PAE Kerkyra as an assistant coach of Babis Tennes he left the club on 29 November of the same year, as Tennes was fired due to poor results. That was the first and the only time that Kalaitzidis would be an assistant coach.

=== Return to Veria and recognition ===
After being unemployed for almost three months, Veria's poor run in 2010–11 Football League would find Giorgos Arvanitidis calling Kalaitzidis to return to Veria. This time, the story would be different. Kalaitzidis saved Veria from relegation and almost touched the play-off(s) entrance after Koriopolis scandal. Though, the first punishments were recalled and Veria who finished 8th that season did not participated in them. Kalaitzidis won the trust of Arvanitidis for another season, as he renew his contract for one more year. After an incredible start, Veria won three matches in a row in the first three fixtures, playing an offensive and beautiful style of football. Although, Veria secured her return to Super League early, something that was against any odd for that season, Kalaitzidis, would quit his post after a 1–0 away defeat (the fifth in till that day out of the six in overall) against Thrasyvoulos as Arvanitidis got furious, entered the dressing room and he start blaming the players for the defeat. Kalaitzidis tried to protect the team and he quit his post. The next day, when both were calmed down, the decided to finish the season and then decide about the future. Veria would finish second, just a point behind Panthrakikos, as in the last matchday, a Veria late goal in 90th minute against Panserraikos, in Serres was mistaken marked as an offside. In the end of the season, Kalaitzidis, resigned from Veria post due to the incident that took place after the match against Thrasyvoulos, but achieved his second career promotion from Football League to Super League . Veria replaced Kalaitzidis with Makis Chavos who was later fired, after the first two fixtures in 2012–13 Super League Greece season. Nikos Karidas was appointed eventually as a caretaker and after a 2–0 defeat in Crete against OFI, Kalaitzidis was appointed again and for the last time till today, as Veria's manager. Kalaitzidis returned to finish what he started. He brought back his offensive style of football and achieved to save Veria from relegation for the first time in Super League after the 1996–97 season. During his last spell as manager of Veria in Super League, Veria and Kalaitzidis enjoyed some big wins against Panathinaikos (3–0), Aris (3–1) and Platanias (5–0). In his last interview as Veria's manager he stated "Another circle is closed for me in Veria, if another opens and when, is still unknown" He also tutored and made a team regular the Nigerian talent Michael Olaitan who was later signed by Olympiacos in the end of that season.

=== Move to Cyprus ===
After his department from Veria, Kalaitzidis was appointed as Nea Salamis Famagusta manager. He used the same football style as he did for Veria, and he had a great run. Although, he was doing great, but after a defeat against Ethnikos Achna part of the fans disapproved him and he decided to leave the club. Despite the club's board effort to convince him to stay in the club, Kalaitzidis did not change his mind and he resigned on 15 January 2014. The club board also mentioned in their announcement about the resignation of Kalaitzidis "In fifteen championship fixtures with Dimitris Kalaitzidis as coach, Nea Salamina had an overall of twenty four points, the best performance of the club in the last nine years, playing a beautiful style of football and he has set the bases for the accomplishment of club's season goals. The administration board of Nea Salamina wishes to its friend Dimitris Kalaitzidis, any future success to his coaching career as well as any personal and family happiness".

=== Aris ===
After Aris were relegated to Football League 2, the president of amateur Aris signed Kalaitzidis as the team manager. Though, the signing of Spyros Gogolos made by Galanos, a temporary president of the club, led Kalaitzidis to quit his post as he was never notified or even asked about that move. "Since you found a defender, find a manager too"'he said and he resigned from the bench of Aris. In December 2017, after his team's Apollon Pontus 1:2 defeat against Aiginiakos F.C., the manager at the time, Kalaitzidis, accused the players of corruption. Allegedly, they received large sums of money to lose games. In January 2020, Kailaitzidis argued with the federation because it had cut the money to teams for television rights to €340,000. Shortly before, his team Apollon Pontus had been eliminated in the cup against Olympiacos Volos F.C..

== Technical Director ==
After his departure from Aris, Kalaitzidis would return to the team again in January 2015, this time as a technical director of the football department. His brother, who is a businessman in the United States of America, became the head of the football department of Aris. As a result of that action, Dimitris Kalaitzidis was appointed to the technical director's position in order to run the club as his brother lives in the States.

== Personal life ==
Kalaitzidis is married and he is the father of two children, Katerina Kalaitzidis and Giannis Kalaitzidis. He's brother is Kosmas Kalaitzidis (Alex Kalas), an American-based businessman who was the head of football department of Aris.
