= Georgios Masadis =

Greek footballer

Personal information
- Full name: Georgios Masadis
- Date of birth: 1944
- Place of birth: Kastoria, Greece
- Date of death: June 5, 2017 (aged 72)
- Place of death: Veria, Greece
- Height: 1.86 m (6 ft 1 in)
- Position: Goalkeeper

Senior career*
Years	Team	Apps	(Gls)
1966–1981	Veria	368	(0)

Managerial career
- 1984–1985: Veria
- 2001–2003: Veria (Goalkeeping Coach)
- * Club domestic league appearances and goals

Georgios Masadis (Greek: Γεώργιος Μασάδης; 1944 – 5 June 2017) was a Greek former professional football (soccer) player who played for the Super League club Veria his entire career from 1966 to 1981 and played in both Alpha Ethniki and Beta Ethniki championships. He was born in Kastoria.

== Career ==
Masadis joined Veria in 1966. Although, he had several offers to join Olympiacos, Panathinaikos, AEK Athens and PAOK, he never left Veria. He is considered as a club legend and he belongs to the long list of one-club men as he played in Veria for fifteen years. He made 368 appearances in both professional league levels of Alpha Ethniki (currently Super League) and Beta Ethniki (currently Football League). He was also manager of Veria during 1984–85 season.

== Personal life ==
After retiring from football in 1981, Masadis moved to Veria permanently. He was also married.

He died in June 2017, aged 72.

== See also ==
- List of one-club men in association football
