= Calvin Kadi =

South African soccer player

Personal information
- Full name: Matome Calvin Kadi
- Date of birth: 12 December 1987 (age 38)
- Place of birth: Pietersburg, South Africa
- Height: 1.82 m (5 ft 11 1/2 in)
- Position: Striker

Youth career
- Remember FC
- University of Pretoria
- 2004–2005: Jomo Cosmos

Senior career*
Years	Team	Apps	(Gls)
2005–2007	Jomo Cosmos	26	(6)
2007–2008	SuperSport United	7	(0)
2008–2011	Bidvest Wits	42	(15)
2010–2011	→ Portimonense (loan)	22	(1)
2011–2012	Veria	31	(20)
2012–2019	Bidvest Wits	46	(10)
- * Club domestic league appearances and goals as of 9:27, 26 September 2019 (UTC)

Matome Calvin Kadi (born 12 December 1987) is a South African former professional soccer player who played as a striker.

== Career ==
Born in Pietersburg, Kadi played youth football for Remember FC and the University of Pretoria before joining Jomo Cosmos in 2004. He later played for SuperSport United and Bidvest Wits, before signing on loan for a year with Portuguese club Portimonense in July 2010.

In 2011, he moved to Greek club Veria, where he became the second top scorer of 2011–12 Football League with 20 goals, below José Emilio Furtado.

On 22 July 2012, he returned to his former team Wits on a four-year contract.

On 27 December 2012, Calvin Kadi was nominated for "Player of the Year" in the Football League and eventually was named the winner on 14 January 2013.

On 9 February 2019, Kadi announced that he retired from football on his personal Facebook account.

== Honours ==
- Football League Player of the Year: 2011-12
