= Veria F.C. =

Disbanded association football club in Greece

Veria
- Full name: ΓΑΣ Βέροια (Γυμναστικός Αθλητικός Σύλλογος Βέροια)
- Nicknames: Vasílissa tou Vorrá (Queen of the North); Rossoblù (The Blue-Reds)
- Founded: 12 September 1960; 66 years ago as G.A.S. Veria
- Dissolved: 2018; 8 years ago (renamed into Veria NFC)
- Ground: Veria Stadium
- Capacity: 7,000

Veria Football Club (Greek: ΠΑΕ Βέροια) was a football club based in Veria, Imathia, Greece. Veria FC was founded in September 1960 when two local teams (Hermes and Vermion) merged.

== History ==
=== 20th century ===
==== 1960s ====
In 1960 two local teams of Imathia, Hermes and Vermion, merged when their founders decided that this was the way to create a more competitive club and unite the local fans. Veria's first appearance in professional football championships came in 1962–63, when they finished sixth in the fourth group of Beta Ethniki. Four years later, the club had a breakthrough, finishing first in the third group of Beta Ethniki and then second in the play-offs to gain their first promotion to Alpha Ethniki. Because of this accomplishment, Veria were nicknamed "Queen of the North".

In their first appearance in Alpha Ethniki (season 1967–68), Veria finished in joint tenth position with PAOK and Panionios and two points behind the privileged fifth position which would have made them eligible for an appearance in the Balkans Cup. The following season (1968–69) saw Veria underperform and be relegated after three play-off matches against Olympiacos Volos. Despite the relegation, Veria achieved promotion the next season, again finishing first in Group C of Beta Ethniki.

==== 1970s and 1980s ====
Veria finished 13th in Alpha Ethniki in the 1970–71 season, during which they suffered a heavy 8–2 defeat by AEK Athens. The following season saw them finish 15th and be relegated again. Despite the relegation, Veria celebrated some notable wins such as against AEK Athens with a score 1–0, Olympiacos with a score 2–1 and against PAOK with another 1–0 score.

From 1972 until 1977, Veria competed in Beta Ethniki. They finished mid-table until 1975 but in 1976–77 tied with Kavala for first place, losing promotion due to inferior goal difference. The following season saw the club achieve promotion back to Alpha Ethniki after a seven-year absence: Veria finished joint first with Doxa Dramas, despite being penalised three points, but they won the promotion due to a superior goal difference.

Veria were relegated again in 1977–78, when they finished 16th. The relegation came after Veria attempted to bribe Christos Hatziskoulidis of Egaleo F.C. to underperform in a match. The team was suspended and deducted ten points.

For the next eight years Veria played in Beta Ethniki, finishing mid-table for seven of them. For five of those seasons Veria faced the other Imathia team, Naoussa, which led to a rivalry between the fans of the two cities. In 1982–83, Naoussa was relegated and the rivality was forgotten.

In 1985–86, Veria played again in Alpha Ethniki following promotion in the previous season. The campaign resulted in the club's best ever league position, finishing joint seventh with AEK Athens and AEL. That season, 12 out of 16 teams, including Veria, were docked six points due to a football players' strike.

Despite the great season in Alpha Ethniki, the following season saw Veria being relegated again, as they finished joint 14th out of 16 teams. They had a worse goal difference than Levadiakos and Diagoras.

==== 1990s ====
After relegation from Alpha Ethniki, Veria remained in Beta Ethniki for three years before being relegated for the first time to Gamma Ethniki. 1991–92 saw them lose promotion back to Beta Ethniki in the last game of the season but they managed the feat in the following year and were able to stay in the division during 1993–94.

Between 1993 and 1997, football in Imathia was at a peak as three of the region's teams played in the professional championships for the first time. In 1994–95, Veria, Naoussa and AE Pontion Verias were part of Beta Ethniki.

In 1995–96 Veria returned to Alpha Ethniki after finishing second in Beta Ethniki. The club finished in 10th position to retain their league status in the following season, when the most notable win was the 1–0 home result against Olympiacos, who won the championship that season. Veria & AEK were the only teams to beat Olympiacos that season. The 1997–98 season saw an improved squad, with players such as Oleg Protasov, Panagiotis Tsalouchidis, finish ninth in the league.

After Veria's win against Olympiacos in season 1997–98, the club was relegated to Beta Ethniki in the following season. This was followed by a further relegation to Gamma Ethniki in the 1999–00 season.

=== 21st century ===
==== 2000s ====
The club experienced management problems and was relegated again in 2000–01, playing in Delta Ethniki for the first time. The new management team, with Konstantinos Gaivazis as head, had to sign 20 players in order that the club could play in Delta Ethniki.

In 2001–02, Veria finished in the mid-table of Deltha Ethniki, ending the sequence of successive relegations. The following season 2002–03, they won every match and returned to Gamma Ethniki after a play-off game against Atsalenios. Another significant achievement for the club that season was the winning of the Amateurs' Cup as they defeated Preveza with score 2–1, in Sofades Stadium at Sofades, Karditsa.

In the 2004–05 season Veria returned to Beta Ethniki after finishing first in the North Group of Gamma Ethniki. In season 2005–06 they finished fifth in Beta Ethniki.

The following season did not start well for Veria but in the second half, with Dimitris Kalaitzidis returning as coach after being dismissed the previous season, they improved to finish third and win promotion to Alpha Ethniki. It was at this time that Alpha Ethniki was renamed as Super League.

Veria's return in Super League was inauspicious. The club underperformed and Kalaitzidis was dismissed three games into the season. There followed a succession of five coaches during the remainder of the campaign, which ended in relegation as they only won five games out of 30 and had also 8 draws. Further upheaval off the pitch followed as the club president, George Arvanitidis, announced his intention to leave.

The following season saw Veria relegated from Beta Ethniki to Gamma Ethniki again, after being docked by three points when Arvanitidis had a fight with the referee during a match against Ilisiakos, accusing him of being stubborn, something that it was never proved. Arvanitidis again threatened to leave the club if people did not stop blaming him for the team's relegation. At the end of the season almost every player was released.

The following season, 2009–10, Veria returned to Beta Ethniki. The promotion was secured in the last match of the season against Fokikos, a match in which Giorgos Kantimoiris saved almost every chance made by Veria. The next season, Kantimoiris joined Veria and became a vital part of the squad which celebrated the return in Super League two years later.

==== 2010s ====
Veria finished 9th in Beta Ethniki in 2010–11, the season in which that division was renamed as the Football League. The season was marred by the scandal of rigged games involving many teams from both the Football League and the Super League. Veria was accused for fake translational awareness and they would be dismissed by the Football League. Something that never happened as Veria was proven to be innocent.

Despite the allegations, Veria played good attacking football, with Calvin Kadi scoring at will and Kalaitzidis having returned as coach since the end of the previous season when he saved them from relegation. The club began the season with three consecutive wins, which was the best start they had ever had in the division. Successes continued and the club returned to the Super League after an absence of four years. Michael Olaitan, a vital part of the team was nominated as Talent of the Year, while Kadi was named Player of the Year, having finished second-highest goalscorer in the Football League with 19 goals. Georgios Kantimiris was nominated for the Goalkeeper of the Year award.

The return to the Super League in 2012–13 was different from previous occasions. Veria signed some notable players, such as Nikos Georgeas, Pantelis Kafes, and Carlo Costly. The team retained their league status by finishing 12th in the table. Notable home wins included the 3–0 victory against Panathinaikos and the 5–0 success against Platanias.

During the summer transfer window of 2013 Veria signed 12 players, including the Serbian striker Miljan Mrdaković and the Czech midfielder, Petr Trapp. At the end of the 2013–14 season, Veria's El Fardou Ben Nabouhane became the first player from the team to finish second in the list of Super League Top Goalscorers, just one goal behind Xanthi's Esteban Solari. The club avoided relegation by finishing in 15th position. Due to the poor performances, despite avoiding relegation, Arvanitidis decided to take radical actions in order to improve matters. He decided to adopt the Spanish style of football, dismissing almost every player in the squad, signing Spanish players and promoting youngsters from the U20 team. He also hired the Spanish coach Quique Hernández as Director of Football and Jose Carlos Granero as the team manager.

On 6 August 2014 the owner and president of the club, Arvanitidis, announced his retirement after selling the club to Theodoros Karipidis, a local businessman. Karipidis failed in an attempt to sign the Argentinian attacking midfielder Ariel Ibagaza because of the player's family issues but did sign some significant players, such as Georgios Georgiadis, Giorgos Katidis, Roberto Battión, Javier Cámpora, the promising Italian-Swedish striker Nicolao Dumitru, the former Real Madrid player Raúl Bravo, and the Serbian offensive midfielder, Zvonimir Vukić. During the winter transfer window Veria also signed the experienced forward, Thomas Nazlidis on a free transfer. Two more significant transfers took place during that window were Spanish midfielder Carlos Caballero, on a six-month loan from Córdoba and Andreas Tatos on a free transfer. Stelios Marangos and Neto also joined the club.

In the first season under Karipidis, Veria finished 14th in the Super League Greece. At the start of the next season, Giorgos Lanaris resigned as team manager after being accused of involvement in fixing a 2012–13 away match between Veria and Olympiacos. Quique Hernández had been fired a few months earlier, along with Granero, after several bad results. Hernández was replaced by Zisis Vryzas in May 2015. On 19 May 2015, the club was judged innocent by the disciplinary committee of the Hellenic Football Federation regarding the match-fixing allegations, despite the statements of Nikos Georgeas and Dimitris Kalaitzidis against the club.

Karipidis also applied changes to the youth squads as he decided to replace Stefanos Gaitanos, who was the head of the youth department for the last three seasons, with Apostolis Terzis, who had previously worked as the head coach of Lefkadia. The club then announced a major expansion and upgrade of Tagarochori Training Center. Karipidis and Vryzas agreed that Georgiadis should replace Granero, who left the club in March 2015.

During his second season as owner, with the help of Vryzas and the head coach, Georgiadis, Karipidis achieved some significant transfers such as the Georgian midfielder, Giorgi Merebashvili and the French defender William Edjenguélé. He also negotiated the return of the Spanish goalkeeper Jonathan López. He was at first unsuccessful in signing the Algerian midfielder, Djamel Abdoun, due to a failure to agree personal terms, but a week later, Veria made an improved offer, with an annual salary of €250,000 and a bonus if the team qualified for the UEFA Europa League through the Super League play-offs. The player and the club made an oral agreement, then waited for Abdoun to be released on a free transfer by Nottingham Forest. Abdoun was announced as a Veria player on 5 August 2015.

On 6 August 2015, Veria signed Vaggelis Nastos, former captain of Atromitos. A day later, there was one more significant transfer with the arrival of the Polish midfielder Radosław Majewski, who was released on a free transfer from Nottingham Forest along with Abdoun. With PAE Kerkyra being relegated to Football League, Veria approached and managed to sign for €100,000 per year the Bosnian forward, Saša Kajkut on a free transfer. On 22 August 2015, Vryzas made a verbal agreement with the Norwegian international defensive midfielder, Abdisalam Ibrahim who last played for Greek giants Olympiacos and who had also spent seven years with Manchester City, another significant transfer was completed for the club. After a bad injury to Balafas, the club signed a one-year deal with their former defensive midfielder Stefanos Siontis, who had been playing for PAE Kerkyra.

On 30 August 2015, Karipidis' confirmed that a group of Chinese businessmen were interested in buying into the club, either as a whole or in part. Karipidis claimed that the group represented a multinational company that wanted to invest in Greek football and in local society. Two days after meeting with the Chinese in September, he said that the deal would be completed in about two or three months as the transfer of shares and the paperwork was a lengthy process.

On 9 September 2015, Karipidis was named the head of football department of amateur club Aris. This automatically meant that once Aris won promotion to the Football League he would be forced to quit as owner of Veria. In further specification, the Chinese group which represent a solar power major multinational company based in Shanghai are willing to invest approximately €10 million in order to buy club's shares package, renovate or build a new training center over Tagarochori Training Center region as well as rebuild Veria Stadium. Also they opt to upgrade all local training facilities of the city of Veria.

On 19 January 2016, Karipidis fired Georgiadis and his staff as the club didn't satisfy with its performance as were as several results were disappointing. On 26 January 2016 the former goalkeeper Dimitrios Eleftheropoulos was appointed as Veria's new coach with assistant the former European champion Stylianos Venetidis. With Eleftheropoulos on the bench Veria avoid the relegation four fixtures before the finale of the championship for the first time in her recent history. During a press conference, Eleftheropoulos announced the reduction of budget to 50% of its current amount and the resignation of many players. He also stated that Veria's new season squad will be based on young talented Greek players in combination with older experienced players.

On 8 May 2016, Karipidis said he was very close to sealing a deal with a Chinese company. He quit as Veria chairman and CEO on 30 May. On 1 June 2016 it was announced that Veria reclaimed the permission of participating in 2016–17 Super League Greece and would be allowed to proceed in transfer without any limitation.

On 23 June 2016, the transfer of shares by Karipidis was complete and he quit all involvement in the club.

==== Decline and dissolution (2016–2018) ====
After the sale of the club was completed, Veria announced a new kit sponsorship for season 2016–17 with the Italian company Givova. After a poor season, both financially and on the pitch, despite remaining in the Super League Greece, Vryzas and Eleftheropoulos decided to cut the club's budget by 5 per cent. As a result, players whose contracts posed a particular burden were released on free transfers and the plan was for the club to sign new talented players who had potential to be sold on in later years.

On 2 July 2016, Karipidis and Vryzas had a disagreement that led to Vryzas quitting his post. Vryzas's departure was followed by that of Eleftheropoulos, who left in sympathy. As a result, the club started to look for new manager.

On 5 July 2016, the shares transfer was complete and the new major shareholder of the club and president, CEO was named Konstantinos Papadopoulos. A fruit and wood dealer who was Karipidis partner back in 2013 while he was also president of Olympiacos Galatades.

Despite the strict budget policy that the new majorholder of the club decided to follow, he signed to the club twenty-one players in his first spell as president of the club. Some of the significant deals that he managed to seal are the signing of the Argentinian forward Pablo Vitti, Greek striker Pantelis Kapetanos, Georgian international left back Giorgi Navalovski and the Spanish midfielder Sisinio. He also appointed to the club the Greek experienced coach Alekos Vosniadis, who replaced Eleftheropoulos.

On 8 September 2016, Committee of Professional Sports didn't allow the transfer of the club's shares from Theodoros Karipidis to Konstantinos Papadopoulos, cause the folder didn't meet the criteria. As a result, Veria wasn't grant a permission of participation to the 2016–17 Super League Greece championship and they are facing a relegation penalty to Football League or even a ban from all professional football championships.

On 22 September 2016, Committee of Professional Sports granted to Veria, the permission of participating to 2016–17 Super League Greece as well as they approved the transfer shares of 93,53% from Theodoros Karipidis to Konstantinos Papadopoulos. Veria was fined €15,000 for their incomplete file on their first attempt.

On 23 September 2016, club coach Alekos Vosniadis left the club after a disagreement between him and the club's board. Thomas Grafas was appointed as his successor a day later on 24 September 2016. After a controversial 4-month spell being the head coach of the club, Grafas and Veria mutually terminated their contract. During his spell as Veria's manager, Grafas achieved to be disliked by the majority of the fans as well as any player of the club and its staff. The contract termination was announced on 26 January 2017. Grafas stayed in the bench of the club for 17 games with a record of one win, eight draws and eight defeats.

Despite the decision of the board to trust the U20 manager Tolis Terzis for the remaining of the season, after the three consecutive defeats from Olympiacos, AEK and home defeat against Panionios, the board of Veria decided to bring Ratko Dostanić for his third spell in the club and fight the battle for survival in the top tier of the Greek football till the end. On 13 February 2017, Veria announced the appointment of Ratko Dostanić for the remaining of the season.

On 9 April 2017, Veria suffered a 1–0 away loss against Panetolikos and got relegated to 2017–18 Football League.

Season's 2017–18 found Queen relegated to the Football League. The club due to heavy financial problems suffered a 6 points removal as they failed to pay Antonio Tomás González and Roberto Battión. On 23 February 2018, Veria officially withdrew from the championship due to heavy financial problems.

On 6 July 2018, the first division disciplinary board of the Football League condemned the club according to the championship's rules about mid season withdrawal to relegation to the Hellenic Amateur Divisions and also starting with –6 points.

== Name, crest and colours ==
The name of the team as well as its colours of the new team that it would occur after the merge were two of the highly important subjects to be solved. As regards the name, there were several suggestions. But the solution was given by G.Lelekakis, who suggested that the team should be named "Veria" as the Italians did to their clubs too, his suggestion was immediately accepted and voted by everyone. Although, due to the rules of that era the name should include words related to the beaten path and reactions, Giannis Kourtis, who has died, suggested to add G.A.S. which meant (Gymanstikos Athlitikos Sillogos), Gymnastic Athletic Club of Veria. So the full club name would be G.A.S. Veria (Greek: Γ.Α.Σ. Βέροια).

As it comes to the choice of the colours, decisive role had the former player and coach of Vermio and former International player of Panionios, Kostas Sotiriadis (Kostaras) who suggested the colours of crimson and blue. That means the colours of Panionios where he did a great football career. Kostaras' suggestion was accepted by the members of the committee as they didn't want to choose colours that would be related to the old club of Vermio (yellow-black) nor of Hermes (green-white). They wanted something new that would be accepted by all Veria fans.

=== Crest evolution ===
The crest of Veria.

=== Kit evolution ===
1960–61	1965–66	2000–01	2007–08	2008–09	2009–10	2010–11

2011–12	2012–13	2013–14	2014–15	2015–16	2016–17

Period	Kit manufacturer	Shirt partner
1985–88	Diadora	Macle Jeans; Pro-Po
1996–97	Lotto	None
1997–99	Umbro	Ksisto
1999–00	Adidas	Laiko Lacheio
2000–05	Umbro	None
2005–11	Mitre	Super-Markets Arvanitidis
2011–12	Nike	Super-Markets Arvanitidis
2012–13	Hummel	Lotto
2013–14	Kappa	Lotto
2014–15	Kappa	Joker
2015–16	Nike	Stoiximan.gr
2016–17	Givova	Joker; Feta Voskopoula (Backshirt)
2017–18	None	None

== Club anthem ==
Veria's first and original anthem was written back in 1960 by the Greek singer and composer Giorgos Kalogirou. In the lyrics there are references to the history of the club as well as to the clubs Ermis and Vermion who merged back in 1960 and created Veria.

Veria's club new anthem was written and composed by Nektarios Mpitros and sung by Charis Akritidis. The new club anthem was released on 23 August 2014

== Supporters ==
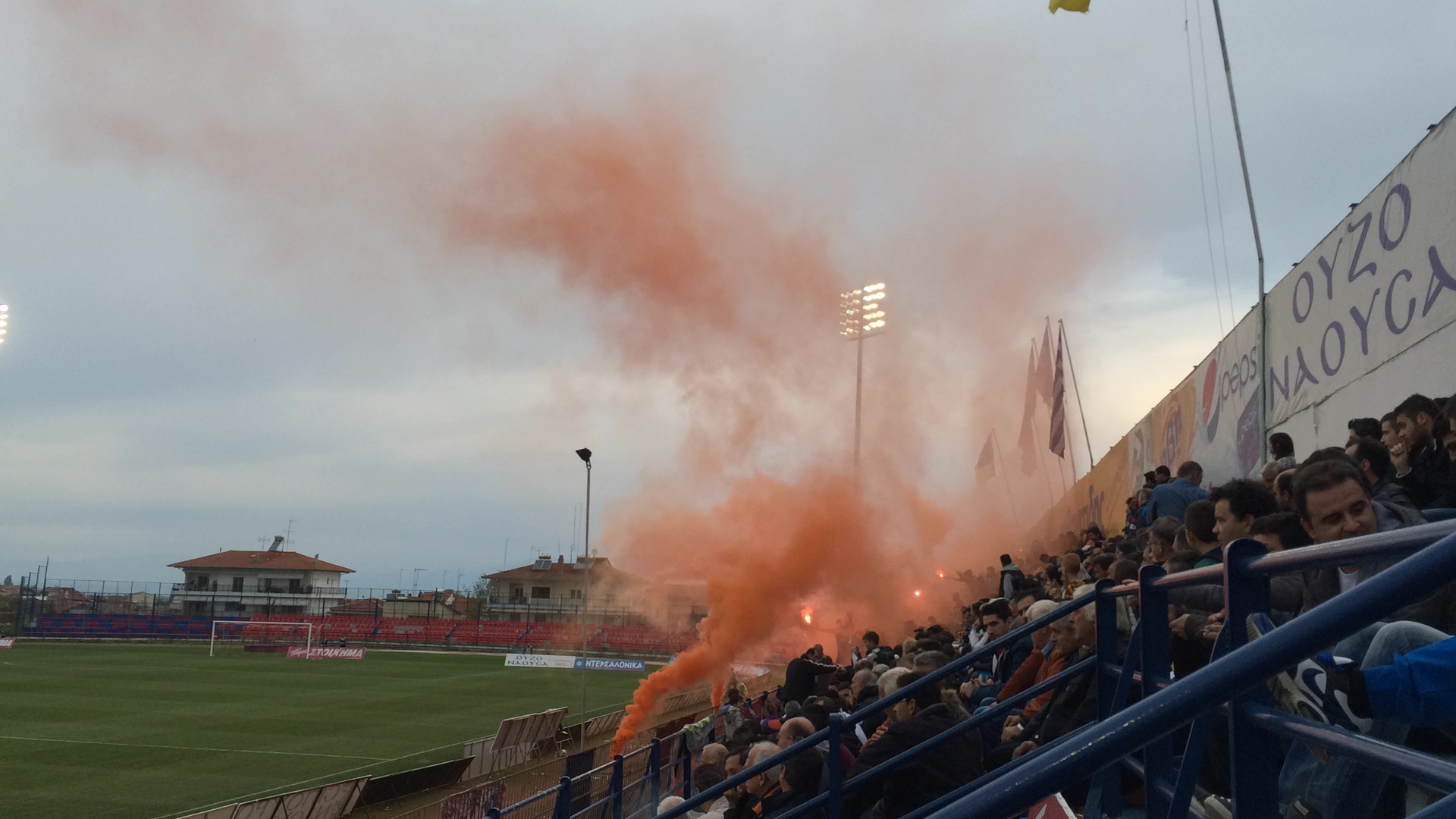
Queen's Boyz & Kallithea Fans

In 1966 the first fan-supporting club of Veria FC was founded and it was named Club of Veria's fans. Today, the club exists but is inactive as there are no official registered members. Few years ago there was a try of re-establishing the club by electing a new management board and by registering new members, but at the end the idea was abandoned. In early 1991 the most successful and powerful club of Veria's supporters, Club of Fans Veria «Gate 4», was founded. The club supported the team for almost a decade inside and outside of Veria as many trips were organised and supported by the club's members in order to support Veria away from her base. Five years later, some members of «Gate 4» who disagreed with the leaders' ideas of the club, left and found another club of supporters which was named Club Vissini (Club Crimson). Club Vissini was disbanded after three years of its foundation, but it was already a part of Veria's bright history as they supported the team for three years in a row.

In 2003 and since Veria was again promoted to Gamma Ethniki there was no club of supporters as Club of Veria's fans was remaining inactive and «Gate 4» club was also disbanded. To cover this absence, Rossoblu Club was found by old members of «Gate 4» and from a younger fan base. The club achieved to unite the citizens and fans of Veria in a tough time of Veria's history while she was trying to return to Beta Ethniki and later to Alpha Ethniki. Rossoblu club was responsible for the arrangement of some big trips such as in Kavala, Serres, Drama, Ioannina, Larisa and Thessaloniki while they followed the team in each away match.

While Club Rossoblu was still active, a group of fans from Makrochori found another fan club, which was named Fan Club of Makrochori Veria's, a club which after a short period of time got its own base in the city centre of Veria. This fan club as it was organised in 2007 was the 'ancestor' of the powerful present fan club, Queen's Boyz. Since then Queen's Boyz support Veria in every home ground game while they organise big trips for Veria's away games.

During the summer of 2013, in Kallithea, a suburb of Veria, a new fan club named Veria Fans Kallithea was found and its base is located in St. Komninon 91.

On 21 August 2015, Queen's Boyz announced their re-activation.

In February 1957 and while playing for Vermion, the goalkeeper of the team, Kostas Pantelidis, died after hitting his head on a goalpost while trying to make a save.

On 2 September 2015, a promising young goalkeeper, Asteris Merkousis, died from a heart attack during a training session.

=== Most receipts ===
#	Match	Tickets	Score	Date
1	vs Panathinaikos	10,309	0–0	20 September 1970
2	vs Doxa Dramas	10,135	2–1	12 April 1970
3	vs Doxa Dramas	9,500	0–0	23 January 1977
4	vs PAOK	9,500	1–3	9 April 1978
5	vs Olympiacos	9,028	2–1	30 January 1972
6	vs PAOK	8,506	1–0	1 November 1970
7	vs Olympiacos	8,234	0–0	22 December 1968
8	vs Olympiacos	8,226	2–1	22 April 1968
9	vs PAOK	8,149	2–1	30 April 1972
10	vs Aris	8,145	2–1	26 January 1969

== Rivalries ==
During the era of the 1990s, Imathia had a great development at her economy and this had a great impact at her football. This development had as a result the rise of Naoussa and Pontioi Verias. Naoussa achieved to win the promotion to Alpha Ethniki in season 1993–94 while Pontioi Verias reached Beta Ethniki in 1992 where they played for 3 constitutive seasons before they finish 17th in season 1994–95 and get relegated. Both Naoussa and Pontioi Verias where seriously damaged by the final crisis in Macedonia and they couldn't return to the greater categories. Though the participation of these two teams in the higher championships developed the rivalry between Veria's fans, Pontioi's fans and Naoussa's fans. In season 1994–95 would find Veria, Naoussa and Pontioi Verias playing in Beta Ethniki. It was the first and the only time during football's history where these three teams would perform at the same championship, at the same season.

== Stadium ==
Veria Stadium

West stand of Veria Stadium

The home ground of Veria is Veria Stadium which is a multi-purpose stadium located in Veria, Greece. It is used for football matches while in the past several music concerts took place there. The stadium was built in 1925. Since then, many improvements have been made, including adding of more seats in the stadium. Today the stadium holds about 7,000. It is situated 1.5 kilometres (0.93 mi) off the city centre. It was built in 1925 by members of music and gymnastics association Megas Alexandros. Record attendance is 10,309 for a game between Veria and Panathinaikos in 1970. However, during a game between Veria and PAOK there were about 12,000 fans, but most of them entered the stadium without a ticket. The stadium formerly held track races too but after the renovations in 2005 and 2007 the space for track runners was removed.

== Training facilities ==
The privately owned sports center of Veria FC is located in Tagarochori region, just outside the city of Veria. It has two full-size football pitches with grandstand and lighting, as well as a building that has locker rooms, fully equipped fitness center and guest house with many amenities for players of the "Queen". On 18 June 2015, Veria FC board announced a major upgrade of their training facilities in Tagarochori. After the end of the upgrade the training center will include new locker rooms, new gym, sauna, whirlpool, recovery room, utility rooms and a brand new pitch, based on Super League Greece main football pitch technical standards in order to provide the best available training invorement. The construction is set to finish in the end of the summer and the upgraded center is expected to be one of the most modern of Greece.

== Honours ==
=== Domestic titles and honours ===
- Total Titles: (9)
  - Football League: (3)
    - 1966, 1970, 1977
  - Third Division: (3)
    - 2005, 2010, 2021
  - Fourth Division: (1)
    - 2003
  - Greek Cup:
    - Quarter Finals (2): 1977–78, 2012–13
  - Greek Amateur Cup: (1)
    - 2003
  - Imathia Cup: (2)
    - 2002, 2003

=== League performance ===
(C) = Champions, (P) = Promoted, (R) = Relegated

Season	League	Position
1962–63	Beta Ethniki (Group D)	6th
1963–64	Beta Ethniki (Group D)	9th
1964–65	Beta Ethniki (Group D)	6th
1965–66	Beta Ethniki (Group C)	1st (C)
1966–67	Alpha Ethniki	13th
1967–68	Alpha Ethniki	10th
1968–69	Alpha Ethniki	15th (R)
1969–70	Beta Ethniki (Group C)	1st (C)
1970–71	Alpha Ethniki	13th
1971–72	Alpha Ethniki	15th (R)
1972–73	Beta Ethniki (Group C)	7th
1973–74	Beta Ethniki (Group C)	6th
1974–75	Beta Ethniki (Group C)	4th
1975–76	Beta Ethniki (Group B)	2nd
1976–77	Beta Ethniki (Group B)	1st (C)
1977–78	Alpha Ethniki	18th (R)
1978–79	Beta Ethniki (Group B)	16th
1979–80	Beta Ethniki (Group B)	4th
1980–81	Beta Ethniki (Group B)	12th
1981–82	Beta Ethniki (Group B)	5th
1982–83	Beta Ethniki (Group B)	4th
1983–84	Beta Ethniki	13th
1984–85	Beta Ethniki	10th
1985–86	Beta Ethniki	2nd (P)
1986–87	Alpha Ethniki	9th
1987–88	Alpha Ethniki	14th (R)
1988–89	Beta Ethniki	6th
1989–90	Beta Ethniki	11th

Season	League	Position
1990–91	Beta Ethniki	18th (R)
1991–92	Gamma Ethniki	3rd
1992–93	Gamma Ethniki	2nd (P)
1993–94	Beta Ethniki	9th
1994–95	Beta Ethniki	11th
1995–96	Beta Ethniki	2nd (P)
1996–97	Alpha Ethniki	10th
1997–98	Alpha Ethniki	9th
1998–99	Alpha Ethniki	17th (R)
1999–2000	Alpha Ethniki	13th (R)
2000–01	Gamma Ethniki	14th (R)
2001–02	Delta Ethniki (Group D)	7th
2002–03	Delta Ethniki (Group C)	1st (C)
2003–04	Gamma Ethniki	8th
2004–05	Gamma Ethniki (North Group)	1st (C)
2005–06	Beta Ethniki	5th
2006–07	Beta Ethniki	3rd (P)
2007–08	Super League Greece	15th (R)
2008–09	Beta Ethniki	16th (R)
2009–10	Gamma Ethniki (North Group)	1st (C)
2010–11	Football League	8th
2011–12	Football League	2nd (P)
2012–13	Super League Greece	12th
2013–14	Super League Greece	15th
2014–15	Super League Greece	13th
2015–16	Super League Greece	14th
2016–17	Super League Greece	16th (R)
2017–18	Football League	17th (R)

==== Best campaigns ====
Season	Achievement	Notes
Greek Cup
1977–78	Quarter-finals	eliminated by PAOK 5–0 in Thessaloniki.
2012–13	Quarter-finals	eliminated by Panthrakikos 1–0 in Komotini, 0–1 in Veria
2014–15	Round of 16	eliminated by Panionios 2–1 in Athens, 1–1 in Veria
Amateurs' Cup
2002–03	Final	Champions against Preveza 2–1 in Sofades

== Players ==
=== One-club men ===
No.	Player	Nationality	Position	Debut	Last match
1	Giorgos Masadis	Greece	Goalkeeper	28 August 1966	31 May 1981

== Notable players ==
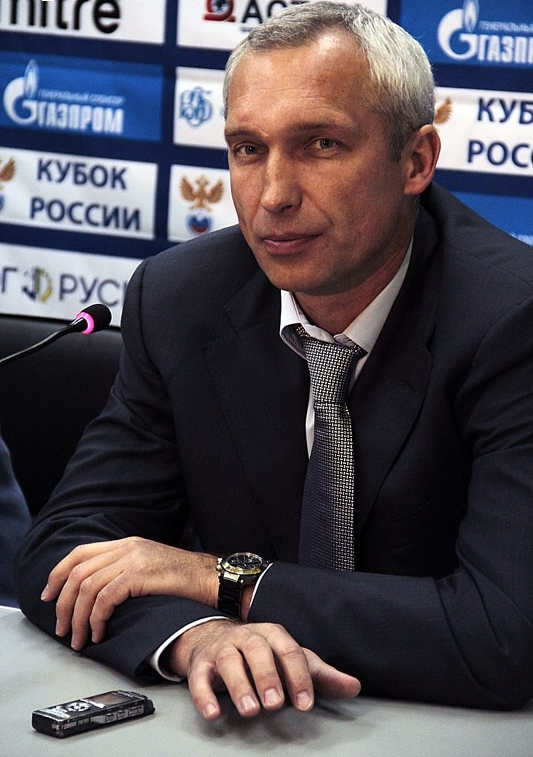
Oleh Protasov

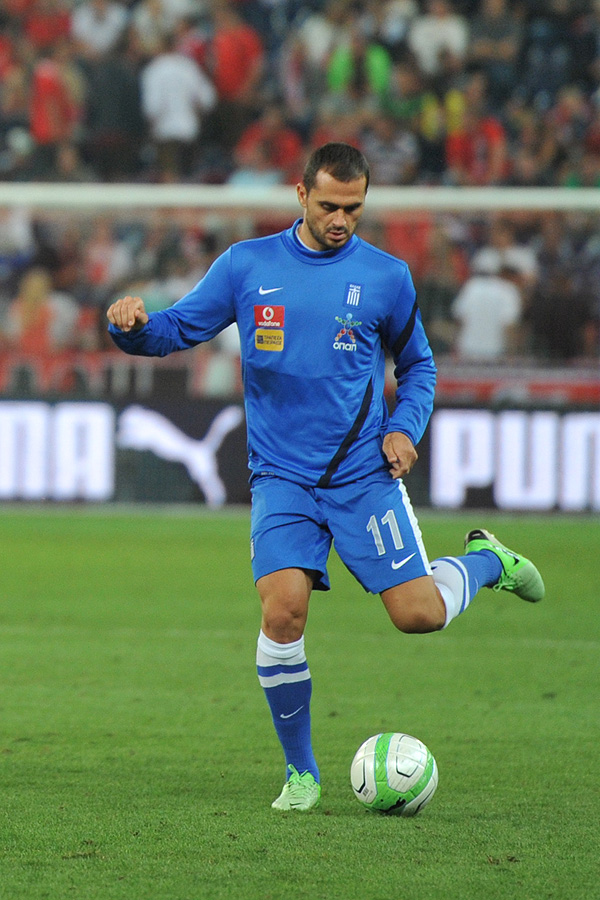
Loukas Vyntra

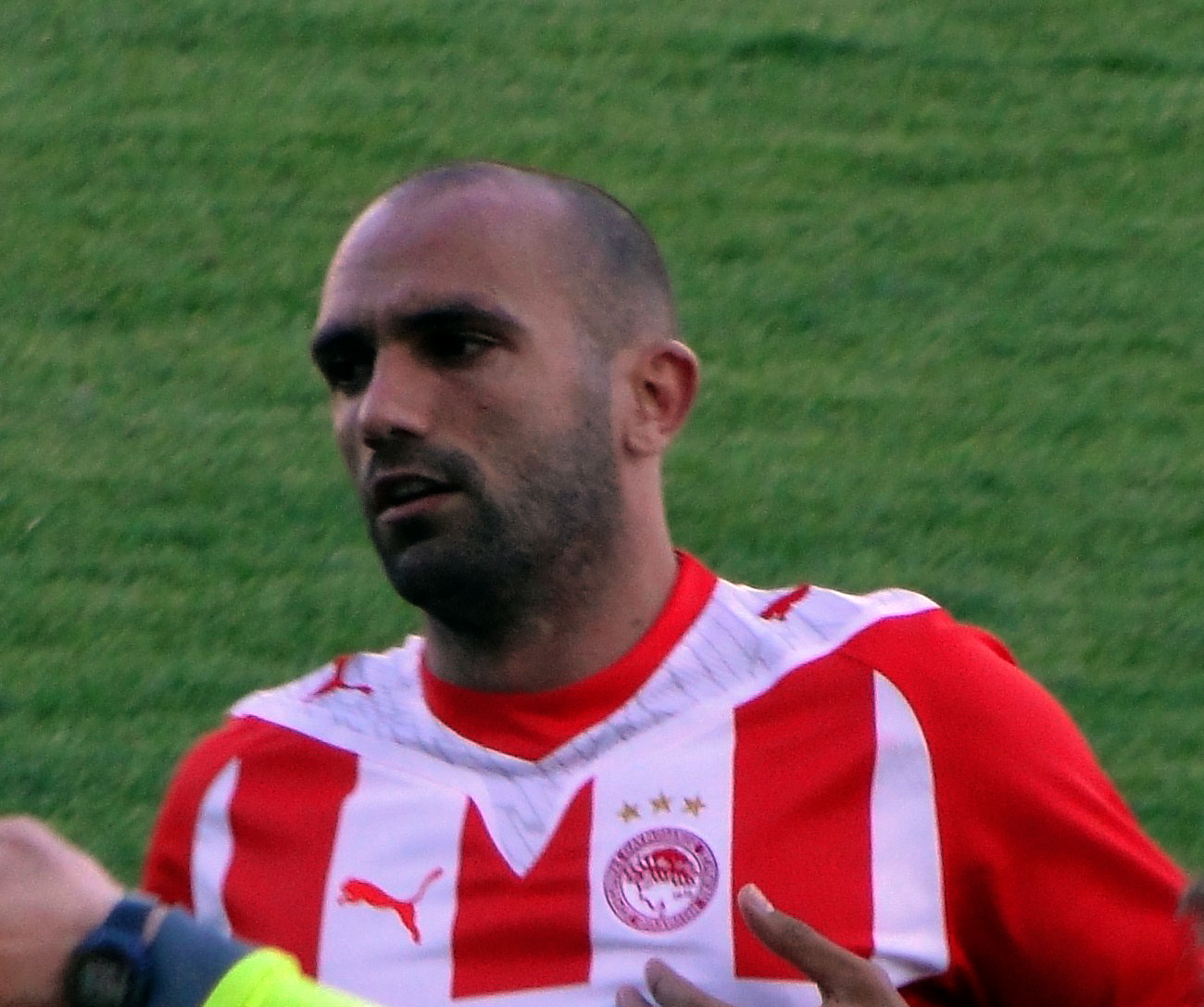
Raúl Bravo

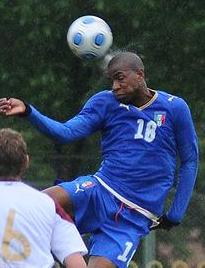
Nicolao Dumitru

Greek players

- (Greece) Aris Adaloglou
- (Greece) Babis Akrivopoulos
- (Greece) Alexandros Alexandris
- (Greece) Dimitrios Amarantidis
- (Greece) Nikolaos Anastasopoulos
- (Greece) Kostas Andriopoulos
- (Greece) Michalis Antoniou
- (Greece) Panagiotis Bachramis (†)
- (Greece) Sotiris Balafas
- (Greece) Kenan Bargan
- (Greece) Giorgos Chatzaras
- (Greece) Iakovos Chatziathanasiou
- (Greece) Angelos Digozis
- (Greece) Andreas Eleftheriadis
- (Greece) Stefanos Gaitanos
- (Greece) Dimitrios Geladaris
- (Greece) Nikolaos Georgeas
- (Greece) Nikolaos Georgiadis
- (Greece) Dimitris Gesios
- (Greece) Christos Giatzitzopoulos
- (Greece) Minas Hantzidis
- (Greece) Christos Ifantidis
- (Greece) Andreas Kaltsas
- (Greece) Nikolaos Kaltsas
- (Greece) Pantelis Kafes
- (Greece) Pantelis Kapetanos
- (Greece) Takis Karagiozopoulos
- (Greece) Evripidis Katsavos
- (Greece) Konstantinos Katsonis
- (Greece) Mpampis Kavasis
- (Greece) Kostas Kefalidis
- (Greece) Giannis Konstantinidis
- (Greece) Dimitris Kottaridis
- (Greece) Sokratis Kousoulakis
- (Greece) Nikos Kyzeridis
- (Greece) Giorgos Lanaris
- (Greece) Thomas Liolios
- (Greece) Giannis Mallous
- (Greece) Stavros Mantziounis
- (Greece) Giorgos Marangos
- (Greece) Giorgos Masadis
- (Greece) Miltos Meletidis
- (Greece) Christos Melissis
- (Greece) Asterios Merkousis (†)
- (Greece) Panagiotis Michailidis
- (Greece) Nikos Mimidis
- (Greece) Tasos Mitropoulos
- (Greece) Giorgos Nasiopoulos
- (Greece) Thomas Nazlidis
- (Greece) Antonis Natsouras
- (Greece) Tasos Oulsouzidis
- (Greece) Sakis Pangouras
- (Greece) Kostas Pantelidis
- (Greece) Giorgos Papadopoulos
- (Greece) Lazaros Papadopoulos
- (Greece) Thomas Papadopoulos
- (Greece) Mimis Papaioannou
- (Greece) Dimitris Papatzikos
- (Greece) Giannis Papafotiou
- (Greece) Christos Pipinis
- (Greece) Savvas Poursaitidis
- (Greece) Christoforos Poursanidis
- (Greece) Georgios Saitiotis
- (Greece) Dimitris Samaras
- (Greece) Charis Savvidis
- (Greece) Babis Savvidis
- (Greece) Giorgos Simos
- (Greece) Sakis Simpos
- (Greece) Giorgos Sioutis
- (Greece) Ilias Solakis
- (Greece) Dimitris Svirkos
- (Greece) Stavros Taramonlis
- (Greece) Andreas Tatos
- (Greece) Apostolos Terzis
- (Greece) Giorgos Terzis
- (Greece) Makis Terzopoulos
- (Greece) Themis Theodoridis
- (Greece) Thodoris Topalidis
- (Greece) Kostas Toutolos
- (Greece) Thomas Troupkos
- (Greece) Yiotis Tsalouchidis
- (Greece) Giorgos Tsiortas
- (Greece) Nikos Tsirelas
- (Greece) Themistoklis Tzimopoulos
- (Greece) Theodoros Vasilakakis
- (Greece) Giannis Vatmanidis
- (Greece) Alexandros Vergonis
- (Greece) Loukas Vyntra

African players

- (Algeria) Djamel Abdoun
- (Cameroon) Lucien Mettomo
- (Comoros) El Fardou Ben Nabouhane
- (Comoros) Mohamed Youssouf
- (Egypt) Amr El Halwani
- (The Gambia) Mustapha Kamal
- (Guinea-Bissau) Zézinho
- (Ivory Coast) Serge Dié
- (Ivory Coast) Did'dy Guela
- (Nigeria) Thankgod Amaefule
- (Nigeria) Emmanuel Ekwueme
- (Nigeria) Henry Isaac
- (Nigeria) Michael Olaitan
- (South Africa) Calvin Kadi
- (Zambia) Rodgers Kola

American players

- (Argentina) Roberto Battión
- (Argentina) Javier Cámpora
- (Argentina) Matías Degra
- (Argentina) Aldo Duscher
- (Argentina) Esteban Herrera
- (Argentina) Juan Pietravallo
- (Argentina) Pablo Vitti
- (Brazil) Marco Aurélio
- (Brazil) Neto
- (Brazil) Orestes
- (Brazil) Zé Carlos
- (Haiti) Frantz Bertin
- (Honduras) Carlo Costly
- (Peru) Carlos Basombrío
- (Peru) Juan Carlos Bazalar
- (Peru) Luis Guadalupe
- (Peru) Jorge Huamán
- (Peru) José Mendoza
- (Venezuela) Ricardo Páez

European players

- (Bosnia and Herzegovina) Saša Kajkut
- (Czech Republic) Zdeněk Hruška
- (Czech Republic) František Jakubec
- (Czech Republic) Petr Trapp
- (England) Wayne Thomas
- (Georgia (country)) Giorgi Merebashvili
- (Georgia (country)) Giorgi Navalovski
- (France) William Edjenguélé
- (France) Cyril Kali
- (France) Franck Rolling
- (France) Mohamadou Sissoko
- (Italy) Nicolao Dumitru
- (Lithuania) Nerijus Astrauskas
- (North Macedonia) Dejan Blaževski
- (Montenegro) Miloš Stojčev
- (Netherlands) Paul de Lange
- (Netherlands) Stefano Seedorf
- (Norway) Abdisalam Ibrahim
- (Poland) Maciej Bykowski
- (Poland) Radosław Majewski
- (Poland) Emmanuel Olisadebe
- (Poland) Mirosław Sznaucner
- (Poland) Bartosz Tarachulski
- (Portugal) Esmaël Gonçalves
- (Portugal) Filipe da Costa
- (Portugal) King
- (Portugal) Zé Vítor
- (Romania) Eugen Neagoe
- (Romania) Stefan Stoica
- (Russia) Pavel Komolov
- (Serbia) Radovan Krivokapić
- (Serbia) Miljan Mrdaković
- (Serbia) Branko Ostojić
- (Serbia) Miloje Petković
- (Serbia) Goran Stevanović
- (Serbia) Ljubomir Vorkapić
- (Serbia) Zvonimir Vukić
- (Slovenia) Miha Kline
- (Slovenia) Saša Ranić
- (Spain) Raúl Bravo
- (Spain) Carlos Caballero
- (Spain) Toni Calvo
- (Spain) Guille
- (Spain) Koke
- (Spain) Jonathan López
- (Spain) Iván Malón
- (Spain) Sisinio
- (Turkey) Erol Bulut
- (Ukraine) Oleh Protasov

Oceanian players

- (Australia) Terry Antonis

=== Most appearances ===
#	Name	Caps	Goals
1	Giorgos Masadis	368	0
2	Dimitris Papatzikos	367	46
3	Sokratis Kousoulakis	360	8
4	Nikos Tsirelas	352	33
5	Panagiotis Michailidis	338	13

=== Most goals ===
#	Name	Caps	Goals
1	Thomas Troupkos	204	55
2	Thomas Papadopoulos	239	54
3	Alexandros Alexandris	137	53
4	Lazaros Papadopoulos	178	50
5	Thomas Liolios	121	49

==== Super League top scorers ====
R	Player	Nationality	Position	Goals	Season
2nd	Ben Nabouhane	(Comoros)	FW	15	2013–14

==== Football League top scorers ====
R	Player	Nationality	Position	Goals	Season
1st	Thomas Liolios	(Greece)	FW	27	1975–76
1st	Alexandros Alexandris	(Greece)	FW	21	1989–90
1st	Alexandros Alexandris	(Greece)	FW	16	1990–91
1st	Thomas Troupkos	(Greece)	FW	14	1994–95
2nd	Calvin Kadi	(South Africa)	FW	20	2011–12
3rd	Giorgos Vakoufaris	(Greece)	FW	16	1985–86

== Managerial history ==
1960s – 1980s Managers

- (Greece) Charis Kreopolidis (1960–61)
- (Greece) Nikos Pangalos (1961–62)
- (Greece) Giannis Voskas (1962–63)
- (Greece) Kostas Velliadis (1963–65)
- (Socialist Federal Republic of Yugoslavia) Sima Milovanov (1965–67)
- (Greece) Antonis Kemanidis (1967)
- (Brazil) Giovanni Varlen (1967–68)
- (Socialist Federal Republic of Yugoslavia) Franjo Pasmanji (1968–69)
- (Greece) Kostas Velliadis (1969–70)
- (Socialist Federal Republic of Yugoslavia) Miljan Zeković (1970–71)
- (Socialist Federal Republic of Yugoslavia) Franjo Pasmanji (1971–72)
- (Greece) Kostas Velliadis (1972–73)
- (Socialist Federal Republic of Yugoslavia) Predrag Milović (1973–74)
- (Greece) Thanasis Loukanidis (1974, 1991)
- (Greece) Giorgos Tsintzoglou (1974–76)
- (Greece) Giannis Zafeiropoulos (1976–77)
- (Bulgaria) Dobromir Zhechev (1977–78)
- (Greece) Giorgos Tsintzoglou (1978, 1981)
- (Greece) Dimitris Kalogiannis (1978–79)
- (Greece) Themis Theodoridis (1979)
- (Greece) Kostas Kefalidis (1979)
- (Greece) Kostas Chatzimichail (1979–80)
- (Greece) Neotakis Loukanidis (1980–81, 1991)
- (Socialist Federal Republic of Yugoslavia) Predrag Milović (1981)
- (Greece) Thanasis Pangalos (1981–82)
- (Greece) Stefanos Gaitanos (1982–83, 1984)
- (Greece) Giorgos Chasiotis (1983)
- (Greece) Giorgos Tsintzoglou (1983–84)
- (Greece) Achilleas Savvidis (1984)
- (Greece) Panagiotis Michailidis & Giorgos Masadis (1984–85)
- (Greece) Telis Batakis (1985–87)
- (Czechoslovakia) Vladimír Táborský (1987–88)
- (Greece) Kostas Karapatis (1988–89)
- (Greece) Michalis Nousias (Caretaker) (1989)
- (Greece) Takis Nikoloudis (1989)
- (Greece) Panagiotis Kermanidis (1989–90)

1990s – 2000s (decade) Managers

- (Greece) Giorgos Tsintzoglou (1990)
- (Greece) Michalis Bellis (1990–91)
- (Greece) Giorgos Tsintzoglou (1991, 1993)
- (Greece) Panagiotis Kermanidis (1991–92)
- (Greece) Thanasis Dimitriadis (1992)
- (Greece) Nikos Karidas (1992, 1997)
- (Greece) Konstantinos Tsilios (1992–93)
- (Brazil) Neto Guerino (1993)
- (Greece) Michalis Nousias (1993–94)
- (Greece) Makis Katsavakis (1994–96)
- (Romania) Sorin Cârțu (1997)
- (Greece) Stefanos Gaitanos (1997–98)
- (Greece) Petros Ravousis (1998)
- (Greece) Aris Adaloglou (Caretaker) (1998)
- (Greece) Giorgos Chatzaras (1998–99)
- (Ukraine) Oleh Protasov (1999–00)
- (Greece) Panagiotis Tsalouchidis (2000)
- (Greece) Takis Karagiozopoulos (2000–01)
- (Greece) Konstantinos Katsonis (2001)
- (Greece) Panagiotis Tsalouchidis (2001–03, 2004, 2008)
- (Romania) Stefan Stoica (2003)
- (Greece) Periklis Amanatidis (2003–04)
- (Greece) Giorgos Kikeridis (2004 (Caretaker), 2005)
- (Greece) Dimitris Kalaitzidis (2004–05, 2005–06)
- (Greece) Makis Katsavakis (2005)
- (Greece) Stefanos Gaitanos (2005–06, 2006–07)
- (Bulgaria) Stojko Mladenov (2006)
- (Greece) Dimitris Kalaitzidis (2006–07, 2007–08)
- (Serbia) Ratko Dostanić (16 October 2007 – 10 December 2007)
- (Greece) Ioannis Matzourakis (14 December 2007 – 11 March 2008)
- (Greece) Leonidas Yfantidis (2008)
- (Greece) Vasilis Papachristou (2008–09)
- (Greece) Georgios Kostikos (11 January 2009 – 30 June 2009)

2010s Managers

- (Greece) Panagiotis Tsalouchidis (1 July 2009 – 19 January 2010)
- (Greece) Timos Kavakas (19 January 2010 – 30 June 2010)
- (Greece) Apostolos Charalampidis (1 July 2010 – 21 November 2010)
- (Greece) Soulis Papadopoulos (23 November 2010 – 31 January 2011)
- (Greece) Dimitris Kalaitzidis (14 February 2011 – 10 June 2012)
- (Greece) Makis Chavos (11 June 2012 – 4 September 2012)
- (Greece) Nikos Karidas (5 September 2012 – 18 November 2012)
- (Greece) Dimitris Kalaitzidis (20 November 2012 – 3 May 2013)
- (Serbia) Goran Stevanović (1 July 2013 – 27 August 2013)
- (Greece) Stefanos Gaitanos (Caretaker) (Aug 2013, Sept 2013)
- (Netherlands) Ton Caanen (2 September 2013 – 29 September 2013)
- (Romania) Stefan Stoica (5 October 2013 – 31 October 2013)
- (Greece) Stefanos Gaitanos (Caretaker) (Nov 2013)
- (Serbia) Ratko Dostanić (16 November 2013 – 22 May 2014)
- (Spain) José Carlos Granero (28 May 2014 – 20 March 2015)
- (Greece) Stefanos Gaitanos (Caretaker) (20 March 2015 – 3 May 2015)
- (Greece) Georgios Georgiadis (19 June 2015 – 19 January 2016)
- (Greece) Dimitrios Eleftheropoulos (26 January 2016 – 6 July 2016)
- (Greece) Alekos Vosniadis (7 July 2016 – 23 Sept 2016)
- (Greece) Thomas Grafas (24 Sept 2016 – 26 Jan 2017)
- (Serbia) Ratko Dostanić (13 February 2017 – 30 Jun 2017)
- (Greece) Apostolos Charalampidis (1 July 2017 – 23 Feb 2018)

== Presidential history ==
Name	Nationality	Years
Grigoris Kouteris	(Greece)	1960–62
Alexandros Kontopoulos	(Greece)	1962–63
Thomas Kallimpakas	(Greece)	1963–65
Vaggelis Triantafillidis	(Greece)	1965–66
Antonis Tsirtopoulos	(Greece)	1966–67
Vaggelis Triantafillidis	(Greece)	1967–69
Panagiotis Iordanou	(Greece)	1969
Charis Papachrisanthou	(Greece)	1969–70
Giorgos Tsaleras	(Greece)	1970–71
Vaggelis Triantafillidis	(Greece)	1971–72
Ilias Lazos	(Greece)	1972–73
Stathis Panagiotidis	(Greece)	1973–74
Thomas Kouteris	(Greece)	1974–75
Giannis Dimitrakakis	(Greece)	1975–76
Thomas Kouteris	(Greece)	1976
Lakis Paschalidis	(Greece)	1976–77
Giorgos Fakas	(Greece)	1977–78
Michalis Karasavvidis	(Greece)	1978
Ilias Liatos	(Greece)	1978–81

Name	Nationality	Years
Charis Savvidis	(Greece)	1981–82
Panagiotis Lekkas	(Greece)	1982–85
Stefanos Kasapis	(Greece)	1985–87
Thanasis Limpantsis	(Greece)	1987–91
Stelios Kiriakidis	(Greece)	1991–93
Konstantinos Ygropoulos	(Greece)	1993
Giorgos Terzis	(Greece)	1993
Antonis Alexiadis	(Greece)	1993–94
Vasilis Tsamitros (†)	(Greece)	1994–98
Alexis Kougias	(Greece)	1998
Vasilis Tsamitros (†)	(Greece)	1998–01
Thanasis Mpizetas	(Greece)	2001
Konstantinos Gaivases	(Greece)	2001–03
Nikos Papadopoulos	(Greece)	2003–05
Giorgos Arvanitidis	(Greece)	2005–14
Theodoros Karipidis	(Greece)	2014–16
Konstantinos Papadopoulos	(Greece)	2016–18

== See also ==
- Imathia Football Clubs Association
- Filippos Veria
- GE Verias
