= Ștefan Stoica (footballer) =

Romanian footballer and coach

Personal information
- Date of birth: 23 June 1967 (age 59)
- Place of birth: Negoieşti, Romania
- Height: 1.72 m (5 ft 8 in)
- Positions: Winger; striker

Team information
- Current team: FC U Craiova (head coach)

Youth career
- –1986: Universitatea Craiova

Senior career*
Years	Team	Apps	(Gls)
1987–1991	Universitatea Craiova	87	(10)
1991–1996	AEL	140	(30)
1994	→ FC U Craiova (loan)	7	(0)
1996–1999	Veria	82	(10)
1999	Steaua București	3	(0)
2000	Extensiv Craiova	7	(0)
Total		326	(50)

International career
1988	Romania U21	1	(0)
1990	Romania	2	(0)

Managerial career
- 2000: Omonia (assistant)
- 2001–2003: Steaua București (assistant)
- 2004–2005: Universitatea Craiova
- 2005: Steaua București (assistant)
- 2006–2007: Universitatea Craiova
- 2007–2008: Gloria Buzău
- 2009: Internațional Curtea de Argeș
- 2009–2010: Farul Constanța
- 2010–2011: Milsami Orhei
- 2011–2012: Gloria Buzău
- 2012–2013: Milsami Orhei
- 2013: Veria
- 2014–2015: Astra Giurgiu (assistant)
- 2015: Zimbru Chișinău
- 2015: Moldova (caretaker)
- 2017: Zimbru Chișinău
- 2017–2018: Zaria Bălți
- 2018: FC U Craiova
- 2019–2020: Ceahlăul Piatra Neamț
- 2021–2025: Moldova U21
- 2025: Moldova U19
- 2025: Moldova U20
- 2026: Spartanii Sportul
- 2026–: FC U Craiova
- * Club domestic league appearances and goals

Ștefan Stoica (born 23 June 1967) is a Romanian professional football coach and a former player. He is the current head coach of FC U Craiova.

Stoica played abroad for AEL and Veria in the Super League Greece.

== Honours ==
=== Player ===
Universitatea Craiova

- Divizia A: 1990–91
- Cupa României: 1990–91
