= Stefanos Gaitanos =

Greek footballer and manager

Stefanos Gaitanos (Greek: Στέφανος Γαϊτάνος; born in 1948) is a Greek former professional football manager and former player who manages Pontioi Veria. He played for Super League clubs Veria and Apollon Athens. His nickname was the "General" (Greek: Στρατηγός). It was given to him by Veria's fans as well as by the newspapers, as he was Veria's main playmaker and his football style was familiar to Mimis Domazos who had the same nickname.

== Playing career ==
Born in Veria, Gaitanos joined Veria in 1960. He left Veria later to join Apollon Athens as he wanted to be closer to his Law school. He retired from football in 1978 in order to finish his studies.

== Managerial career ==
Stefanos graduated from law school and also became a coach. His first team to manage was Doxa Makrochori (later renamed to Makrochori. He also worked for Veria's in youth level. Two years after joining Makrochori as manager he received a contract offer by Naoussa which was playing in Football League. At the age of 33, Stefanos became manager of a Football League coach. He spent 3.5 years in Naoussa winning a promotion to Football League. He also worked for Alexandria, a local team in Imathia. He later joined Pontioi Veria where he stayed for four more years. He also worked for Eordaikos and won the promotion to Football League. Gaitanos has also worked for Veria as a team manager and as an interim. He also worked again in the 2000s for Eordaikos. He is the head coach of Veria U20 squad and he also controls the youth academies of the club.

He owns a football academy named after himself in Veria, the Stefanos Gaitanos Football Academy.

During his managerial career, he discovered some of Greece's most important football players; some of the players that he trained, guided and offered to Greek football were Vasilios Tsiartas at Alexandria, Alexis Alexandris at Veria, Pantelis Kafes, Nikos Dabizas, Andreas Niniadis, Dimitrios Geladaris and Ilias Atmatsidis at Pontioi Veria.

== Personal life ==
After retiring from football in 1978, Stefanos got his Law school degree. He is married and also has a daughter, Katerina, who's a football coach at "Stefanos Gaitanos Football Academy", she also worked for Veria as coach for the youth squads.
