= Michael Olaitan =

Nigerian footballer

Personal information
- Full name: Michael Olaitan Oyeneye
- Date of birth: 1 January 1993 (age 33)
- Place of birth: Jos, Nigeria
- Height: 1.84 m (6 ft 0 in)
- Position: Forward

Youth career
- –2011: Mighty Jets

Senior career*
| Years | Team | Apps | (Gls) |
| 2011–2013 | Veria | 62 | (14) |
| 2013–2016 | Olympiacos | 16 | (8) |
| 2014–2015 | → Ergotelis (loan) | 12 | (1) |
| 2015 | → Twente (loan) | 15 | (0) |
| 2016 | → Kortrijk (loan) | 7 | (0) |
| 2016–2017 | Panionios | 6 | (0) |
| 2017–2018 | Samtredia | 13 | (6) |
| 2018–2019 | Apollon Pontus | 27 | (4) |
| 2020–2021 | Panserraikos | 7 | (1) |

International career
| 2013–2014 | Nigeria U20 | 8 | (0) |
- * Club domestic league appearances and goals as of 6 June 2021

Michael Olaitan Oyeneye (born 1 January 1993) is a Nigerian professional footballer who plays as a forward.

== Club career ==
=== Veria ===
Michael Olaitan started his career at the youth team of Mighty Jets in the Nigerian Premier League and in February 2011 he moved to Veria, who were playing in the Football League at the time. He was a first team regular and one of the club's best players during Veria's successful 2011–12 season, when they won promotion to the Super League Greece as runners-up of the 2011–12 Football League.

On 27 December 2012, Olaitan was nominated for "Talent of the Year" in the Football League.

=== Olympiacos ===
Olaitan signed for Olympiacos on a free transfer, after leaving his former team Veria during the summer of 2013.

On 3 March 2014, Michael Olaitan’s agent said the Olympiacos striker, who collapsed during Sunday’s Athens derby against Panathinaikos, is not suffering from any serious medical condition. The 21-year-old Nigerian was rushed to hospital for tests after briefly losing consciousness midway through the first half of the runaway Super League leader’s 3-0 home defeat. “I am pleased to inform everyone that after initial tests there is no sign of a serious medical condition,” said Olaitan’s representative Paschalis Tountouris next day.“What appears to have happened is that Michael had a mild case of viral myocarditis. As a precautionary measure he will remain in hospital for the next few days to undergo further tests.” Myocarditis is an inflammation of the heart muscles often caused by an infection.

After his hospitalization, Olaitan began training on his own. Doctors said it would take several months before the former Nigeria U20 star could play again. Since the incident, Olaitan had a good first season at Greek champions Olympiacos with 16 appearances and eight goals after moving as a free agent from another Greek club Veria.

==== Loan to Ergotelis ====
Olaitan strengthened Ergotelis for the second half of the 2014-15 season, on loan from Olympiacos. He suffered from acute myocarditis, but gradually returned to normal pace workouts returned to play on 21 January 2015 on the away game against Tyrnavos 2005 F.C. for the Greek Cup. Olaitan scored once in twelve appearances in the Greek top division.

==== Loan to Twente ====
On 30 July 2015, Olaitan signed a year contract with FC Twente on loan from Olympiacos . "After discussions with my family, I have consciously chosen FC Twente. Dutch football suits me" he explained to the club site. "I have followed Michael for four years, because I think he is a great striker," said technical director Ted van Leeuwen. "He is versatile, highly disciplined and cool. I find it extraordinary that we have managed to bring this talented player to Enschede. Although he's still only 22 years old, he already has the necessary experience and his personality fits very well in our dressing room. His career just need a little push."

==== Loan to Kortrijk ====
Belgian club KV Kortrijk announced the signing of Nigerian striker of Olympiacos on loan until the end of season. The 23-year-old forward spent the first six months of 2015-16 at FC Twente, but failed to score any goals in 18 appearances.

=== Panionios ===
On 20 July 2016, the Nigerian winger will continue his career at Panionios. The 23-year-old striker, who was released earlier today from Olympiacos, has signed a 1+1-year deal with the Greek club, as it was officially announced. On 3 February 2017, only six months after his announcement, the officials of the club decided to release him, since he was not in manager Vladan Milojevic's first-team plans.

=== Samtredia ===
On 23 August 2017, Georgian champions Samtredia have signed the Nigerian winger as a free agent, on a one-year deal. The former Nigeria youth international was released by Greek club Panionios in February 2017.

=== Luftëtari Gjirokastër ===
On 14 June 2019 it was confirmed, that Olaitan had joined Ayia Napa FC from the Cypriot second division. However, a few days later, it was reported that Albanian club Luftëtari Gjirokastër FC had offered 50,000 euros for the player and there was ongoing negotiations. He ended up joining the Albanian Superliga club.

== International career ==
On June 4, 2013 Olaitan made his debut with the Nigerian U20 national team, against Brazil U20. The match ended with a draw (1-1).
