= 2015–16 Veria F.C. season =

Veria
2015–16 season
- Owner: Theodoros Karipidis
- Chairman: Theodoros Karipidis
- Manager: Dimitrios Eleftheropoulos
- Stadium: Veria Stadium, Veria
- Super League: 14
- Greek Cup: Round of 16
- Top goalscorer: League: Thomas Nazlidis (5 goals); All: Thomas Nazlidis (5 goals)
- Highest home attendance: 3,557
- Lowest home attendance: 500 (v Panthrakikos)
- Average home league attendance: 1,201
Home colours	Away colours	Third colours

Season 2015–16 is the 16th of Veria in Super League Greece. Veria will compete in the following competitions Super League and Greek Cup. The season covers the period from 1 July 2015 to 30 June 2016.

== Players ==
=== Squad information ===
No.	Name	Nationality	Position (s)	Date of Birth (Age)	Signed from	Contract until
Goalkeepers
1	Georgios Kantimiris	(Greece)	GK	19 September 1982 (31)	(Greece) Fokikos	30 June 2016
55	Jonathan López	(Spain)	GK	16 April 1981 (34)	(Spain) Getafe	30 June 2017
96	Giorgos Vasileiadis	(Greece)	GK	10 June 1996 (19)	Youth system	30 June 2019
Defenders
31	Dimitris Giannoulis	(Greece)	LB/LM	17 October 1996 (18)	(Greece) PAOK	30 June 2016
2	Darcy Neto	(Brazil)	RB	7 February 1981 (34)	(Greece) Veria	30 June 2016
18	Iván Malón	(Spain)	RB	26 August 1986 (28)	(Spain) Mirandés	30 June 2016
28	Vaggelis Nastos	(Greece)	RB/CB	13 September 1980 (34)	(Greece) Atromitos	30 June 2016
3	Cyril Kali	(France)	CB/RB	21 January 1984 (30)	(Greece) Panetolikos	30 June 2017
5	Stelios Marangos	(Greece)	CB	4 May 1989 (25)	(Greece) Kerkyra	30 June 2016
23	William Edjenguélé	(France)	CB	7 May 1987 (28)	(Greece) Panetolikos	30 June 2017
44	Achilleas Poungouras	(Greece)	CB	13 December 1995 (19)	(Greece) PAOK	30 June 2016
19	Anestis Karakostas	(Greece)	CB/DM	15 June 1991 (24)	(Greece) Iraklis	30 June 2018
4	Raúl Bravo	(Spain)	LB/CB	14 April 1981 (34)	(Greece) Aris	30 June 2016
Midfielders
6	Roberto Battión	(Argentina)	DM	1 March 1982 (32)	(Argentina) Independiente	30 June 2016
8	Branko Ostojić	(Serbia)	DM	3 January 1984 (31)	(Serbia) Javor	30 June 2016
25	Sotiris Balafas	(Greece)	DM	19 August 1986 (28)	(Ukraine) Hoverla	30 June 2017
24	Abdisalam Ibrahim	(Norway)	DM	1 May 1991 (24)	(Greece) Olympiacos	30 June 2017
22	Stefanos Siontis	(Greece)	DM/RB	4 September 1987 (27)	(Greece) Kerkyra	30 June 2016
21	Alexandros Vergonis	(Greece)	CM	1 December 1985 (28)	(Greece) Rodos	30 June 2016
86	Radosław Majewski	(Poland)	CM/AM	15 December 1986 (28)	(England) Nottingham Forest	30 June 2017
13	Mohamed Youssouf	(Comoros)	LW	26 March 1988 (27)	(Greece) Ergotelis	30 June 2017
20	Dimitris Melikiotis	(Greece)	RW/CF	10 July 1996 (19)	Youth system	30 June 2019
7	Giorgos Georgiadis	(Greece)	LW/RW	14 November 1987 (26)	(Greece) PAOK	30 June 2016
93	Djamel Abdoun	(Algeria)	LW/RW	14 February 1986 (29)	(England) Nottingham Forest	30 June 2017
11	Giorgi Merebashvili	(Georgia (country))	AM/LW/RW	15 August 1986 (28)	(Greece) OFI Crete	30 June 2017
15	Pedro Arce	(Mexico)	AM	25 November 1991 (24)	(Greece) Kavala	30 June 2016
--	Giorgos Bouzoukis	(Greece)	CM	26 July 1993 (22)	(Greece) Chania	30 June 2018
Forwards
9	Thomas Nazlidis	(Greece)	CF	23 October 1987 (27)	(Greece) Platanias	30 June 2016
14	Rodgers Kola	(Zambia)	CF	4 July 1989 (26)	(Belgium) Gent	30 June 2016
77	Saša Kajkut	(Bosnia and Herzegovina)	CF	7 July 1984 (31)	(Greece) Kerkyra	30 June 2017
80	Panagiotis Xoblios	(Greece)	CF	27 February 1996 (19)	Youth system	30 June 2019
33	Dimitrios Manos	(Greece)	CF	16 September 1994 (21)	(Greece) Ergotelis	30 June 2019

=== Transfers ===
==== Summer Transfers ====
In: Note: Flags indicate national team as defined under FIFA eligibility rules; some limited exceptions apply. Players may hold more than one non-FIFA nationality.

No.	Pos.	Nation	Player
—	MF	ALG	Djamel Abdoun (from (England) Nottingham Forest)
—	FW	BIH	Saša Kajkut (from (Greece) Kerkyra)
—	DF	BRA	Darcy Neto (returned to club after being released by it)
—	MF	COM	Mohamed Youssouf (from (Greece) Ergotelis)
—	GK	ESP	Jonathan López (from (Spain) Getafe)
—	FW	ESP	Koke (from (India) NorthEast United)
—	DF	FRA	William Edjenguélé (from (Greece) Panetolikos)
—	MF	GEO	Giorgi Merebashvili (from (Greece) OFI)
—	DF	GRE	Nikos Tsoumanis (from (Greece) Panthrakikos)
—	DF	GRE	Vaggelis Nastos (from (Greece) Atromitos)
—	MF	GRE	Stefanos Siontis (from (Greece) Kerkyra)
—	MF	GRE	Marios Papadopoulos (loan return from (Greece) Aris)
—	MF	GRE	Anestis Karakostas (from (Greece) Iraklis)
—	MF	GRE	Giorgos Bouzoukis (from (Greece) Pierikos)
—	MF	GRE	Dimitris Giannoulis (on loan from (Greece) PAOK)
—	MF	NOR	Abdisalam Ibrahim (from (Greece) Olympiacos)
—	MF	POL	Radosław Majewski (from (England) Nottingham Forest)
—	FW	ZAM	Rodgers Kola (on loan from (Belgium) Gent)

Out: Note: Flags indicate national team as defined under FIFA eligibility rules; some limited exceptions apply. Players may hold more than one non-FIFA nationality.

No.	Pos.	Nation	Player
—	FW	ARG	Javier Cámpora (released)
—	FW	AUS	Theo Markelis (to (Australia) Hume City)
—	DF	BRA	Neto (released)
—	MF	CMR	Cédric Mandjeck (to (Spain) CF Pobla de Mafumet)
—	FW	COM	Ben (to (Greece) Olympiacos)
—	GK	ESP	Xavi Ginard (tο (Greece) Aris)
—	DF	ESP	José Catalá (released)
—	DF	ESP	Raúl Bravo (tο (Greece) Aris)
—	MF	ESP	Carlos Caballero (loan return to (Spain) Córdoba).
—	MF	ESP	Jokin Esparza (released)
—	MF	ESP	David Vázquez (released)
—	FW	ESP	Koke (to (Greece) Aris)
—	GK	GRE	Dimitris Chomsioglou (released)
—	DF	GRE	Dimitrios Amarantidis (released)
—	DF	GRE	Nikos Tsoumanis (tο (Greece) Aris)
—	DF	GRE	Angelos Vertzos (to (Greece) AEL)
—	MF	GRE	Kenan Bargan (released)
—	MF	GRE	Nikos Kaltsas (to (Greece) Panathinaikos)
—	MF	GRE	Marios Papadopoulos (to (Greece) Aris)
—	MF	GRE	Andreas Tatos (tο (Greece) Aris)
—	MF	GRE	Charalampos Pavlidis (tο (Greece) Aris)
—	MF	GRE	Giorgos Bouzoukis (on loan to (Greece) Chania)
—	FW	GRE	Dimitrios Manos (on loan to (Greece) Ergotelis)
—	FW	GRE	Stefanos Dogos (released)
—	FW	ITA	Nicolao Dumitru (loan return to (Italy) Napoli)
—	FW	PAN	Julio Segundo (released)

==== Winter Transfers ====
In: Note: Flags indicate national team as defined under FIFA eligibility rules; some limited exceptions apply. Players may hold more than one non-FIFA nationality.

No.	Pos.	Nation	Player
—	DF	ESP	Raúl Bravo (on loan from (Greece) Aris)
—	MF	GRE	Giorgos Bouzoukis (loan return from (Greece) Chania)
—	FW	GRE	Dimitrios Manos (loan return from (Greece) Ergotelis)

Out: Note: Flags indicate national team as defined under FIFA eligibility rules; some limited exceptions apply. Players may hold more than one non-FIFA nationality.

No.	Pos.	Nation	Player
—	MF	GEO	Giorgi Merebashvili (to (Greece) Levadiakos)
—	MF	NOR	Abdisalam Ibrahim (released)

== Technical and medical staff ==
Technical staff
Head coach	(Greece) Dimitrios Eleftheropoulos
Assistant coach	(Greece) Stylianos Venetidis
Goalkeeping coach	(Greece) Dimitris Kottaridis
Fitness coach	(Greece) Ilias Ampatzidis
Fitness coach	(Serbia) Goran Guzijan
Team Manager	(Greece) Panagiotis Tsalouchidis
Interpreter	(Brazil) King
Caregiver	(Greece) Thanasis Voulgaris
Caregiver	(Greece) Kosmas Rozintsis
Scouting staff
Scout	N/A
Medical staff
Physio	(Greece) Anastasios Tiflidis
Masseur	(Greece) Fotis Konstantakos
Masseur	(Greece) Dimitris Lamprinidis
Masseur	(Greece) Charis Pantelidis
Pathologist	(Greece) Georgios Avramopoulos
Orthopedist	(Greece) Nikolaos Dimou
Urologist	(Greece) Georgios Minas
Surgeon	(Greece) Prodromos Isaakidis
Dentist	(Greece) Despοina Karvouna
Νutritionist	(Greece) Athanasios Topis

=== Veria Academy ===
Academy staff
Technical Director	(Greece) Nikos Karabiberis
General Manager	(Greece) Georgia Tsiamoura
U20 coach	(Greece) Apostolis Terzis
Assistant coach	(Greece) Germanos Safarikas
Goalkeeping coach	(Greece) Dimitris Kottaridis
U17 coach	(Greece) Dimitris Christoforidis
U15 coach	(Greece) Giannis Kapsaliaris

== Season Milestones ==
- On 20 May 2015, Super League's court found Veria innocent as she was accused for fixing the game against Olympiacos F.C. in 2013.
- On 21 May 2015, Cyril Kali expanded his contract with the club for two more years while Branko Ostojić expanded his contract until 31 June 2016.
- On 25 May 2015, Pedro Arce signed a one-year contract expansion.
- On 26 May 2015, Javier Campora and Jose Catala mutually terminated their contracts with the club.
- On 29 May 2015, Sotiris Balafas signed his new contract which is set to expire on 31 June 2017.
- On 2 June 2015, Alexandros Vergonis renewed his contract with the club until 31 June 2016.
- On 18 June 2015, Veria F.C. board announced a major upgrade of their training facilities in Tagarochori.
- Veria's pre-season preparation will take place at Golden Tulip, in Arnhem, Netherlands.
- Veria's first training of the season took place on 6 June 2015 at Tagarochori Training Center.
- On 8 July 2015 Veria was judged as innocent for the suspected fixed match against Olympiacos, on 6 January 2013, by the appeal committee of Hellenic Football Federation and they will remain in Super League for fourth consecutive year, a record for the club as they never before survived for more than three seasons at the top tier of Greek football.
- On 3 August 2015 Levadiakos' appeal at Referee's Football Court of Hellenic Football Federation was turned down and Veria permanently secured her position in the Super League.
- On 30 August 2015, Theodoros Karipidis confirmed the interest of a Chinese group of businessmen to buy club's partly or whole shares package. They arranged an appointment in Milan, Italy which will take place on 2 September 2015.
- On 31 August 2015, Stefanos Dogos was released on a free transfer by the club while Dimitris Manos was given on loan to Ergotelis in Football League.
- On 2 September 2015, Asterios Merkousis who was a young goalkeeper of Veria U20 youth squad that the club was expecting a lot to come from his talent, during the evening training of the same day with the first team squad died as he suffered from a heart attack. An ambulance brought him to Veria's hospital but doctors didn't make it to keep him alive.
- On 19 January 2016, Georgios Georgiadis was fired by the club after several disappointing results.
- Dimitrios Eleftheropoulos was appointed as Veria's new manager on 26 January 2016. His assistant will be Stylianos Venetidis.
- Veria finished 14th in the Super League Greece championship, securing a position for the next season.

== Fixtures & Results ==
=== Overall ===
Competition	Started round	Current position / round	Final position / round	First match	Last match
Super League Greece	Regular season	14th	14th	23 August 2015	17 April 2016
Greek Cup	Second Round	Third Round	Third Round	28 October 2015	13 January 2016

Last updated: 17 April 2016
Source: Competitions

=== Pre-season Friendlies ===
Win Draw Loss Upcoming fixture

22 July 2015 Friendly	Veria	1 – 0	Osmanlıspor	Heelsum, Arnhem
18:00 (UTG+2)	Nazlidis 43'	Report		Attendance: N/A; Referee: N/A

25 July 2015 Friendly	Den Haag	1 – 2	Veria	Kyocera Stadion, The Hague
14:30 (UTG+2)	Gorre (pen.), 91'	Report	Balafas 5', 11'	Attendance: N/A; Referee: N/A

28 July 2015 Friendly	Veria	0 – 2	Gençlerbirliği	vv Duno Stadion, Doorwerth
19:00 (UTG+2)		Report	El Kabir 45'; Koçer 90'	Attendance: N/A; Referee: N/A

1 August 2015 Friendly	Heracles	2 – 1	Veria	DOS’ 37 Sportpark Het Midden, Almelo
15:30 (UTG+2)	Zomer 36'; Gladon 84'	Report	Balafas 61', (red card) 65'	Attendance: N/A; Referee: N/A

5 August 2015 Friendly	Veria	0 – 0	Skoda Xanthi	Veria Stadium, Veria
19:00 (UTG+3)		Report		Attendance: 2,000; Referee: (Greece) D. Karantonis

9 August 2015 Friendly	Veria	2 – 1	Kerkyra	Veria Stadium, Veria
19:30 (UTG+3)	Nazlidis 15'; Kola 40'	Report	Kajkut (pen.), 54'	Attendance: 1,000; Referee: (Greece) G. Vreskas

14 August 2015 Friendly	Veria	2 – 1	PAOK	Veria Stadium, Veria
20:00 (UTG+3)	Nazlidis 23'; Merebashvili 90'	Report	Jairo 73'	Attendance: 3,000; Referee: (Greece) D. Karantonis

=== Friendlies ===
Win Draw Loss Upcoming fixture

5 September 2015 Friendly	Panserraikos	1 – 2	Veria	Sidirokastro, Serres
18:00 (UTG+3)	Aggeloudis 18'	Report	Neto 21'; Georgiadis 32'	Attendance: N/A; Referee: N/A

Cancelled Friendly	Asante Kotoko (Ghana)	v	Veria	Baba Yara Stadium, Kumasi
ΤΒΑ				Attendance: N/A; Referee: N/A

=== Fixtures ===
23 August 2015 1	Veria	1 – 1	PAS Giannina	Veria
19:15 (UTG+3)	Abdoun (yellow card) 49'; Nazlidis 90+2'	Report	Berios (yellow card) 8'; Acosta 43'	Stadium: Veria Stadium; Attendance: 827; Referee: (Greece) T. Tzilos; Man of the Match: (Greece) Thomas Nazlidis

29 August 2015 2	Panthrakikos	0 – 2	Veria	Komotini
19:15 (UTG+3)	Setti (yellow card) 12'; Martins 23'	Report	Djamel Abdoun 15', (pen.), 70'; Majewski (yellow card) 35'; Tsoumanis (yellow card) 55'; Edjenguélé (yellow card) 76'	Stadium: Komotini Municipal Stadium; Attendance: 1,069; Referee: (Greece) I. Spathas; Man of the Match: (Algeria) Djamel Abdoun

12 September 2015 3	Veria	0 – 3	PAOK	Veria
18:15 (UTG+3)	Marangos (yellow card) 54'; Nastos (yellow card) 90'	Report	Athanasiadis 17'; Mak 25'; Kitsiou (yellow card) 54'; Tziolis 55'	Stadium: Veria Stadium; Attendance: 3,557; Referee: (Greece) M. Voskakis; Man of the Match: (Greece) Dimitrios Pelkas

22 September 2015^{1} 4	Panetolikos	1 – 1	Veria	Agrinio
18:15 (UTG+3)	Koutromanos (yellow card) 9'; Bejarano (yellow card) 23'; Papazoglou (yellow card) 52'; Romero 82'	Report	Marangos (yellow card) 36'; Ibrahim (yellow card) 42'; Nazlidis 77'	Stadium: Panetolikos Stadium; Attendance: 1,821; Referee: (Greece) A. Giachos; Man of the Match: (Argentina) Emiliano Romero

28 September 2015 5	Veria	1 – 2	AEK Athens	Veria
19:30 (UTG+3)	Poungouras (yellow card) 28'; Neto 32'; Siontis (yellow card) 38'; Nazlidis (yellow card) 90+2'	Report	Buonanotte 49'; Simões (yellow card) 51'; Vargas (yellow card) 87'; Barbosa 90', (yellow card) 90+2'; Baroja (yellow card) 90+4'	Stadium: Veria Stadium; Attendance: 3,348; Referee: (Greece) A. Aretopoulos; Man of the Match: (Portugal) Hélder Barbosa

4 October 2015 6	AEL Kalloni	0 – 1	Veria	Mytilene
18:15 (UTG+3)	Kaltsas (yellow card) 12'; Ukah (yellow card) 73'; Bargan (yellow card) 90+3'	Report	Marangos (yellow card) 40'; Abdoun 90+4' (pen.)	Stadium: Mytilene Municipal Stadium; Attendance: 926; Referee: (Greece) E. Kiotzenis; Man of the Match: (Algeria) Djamel Abdoun

18 October 2015 7	Veria	0 – 1	Atromitos	Veria
16:00 (UTG+3)	Majewski (yellow card) 37'; Marangos (yellow card) 70'; Poungouras (yellow card) 90+5'	Report	Lazaridis (yellow card) 27'; Kivrakidis (yellow card) 31'; Le Tallec 46'; Godoy (yellow card) 73'	Stadium: Veria Stadium; Attendance: TBA; Referee: (Greece) A. Sidiropoulos; Man of the Match: TBA

25 October 2015 8	Panionios	0 – 1	Veria	Athens
17:15 (UTG+3)	Boumale (yellow card) 60'; Tasoulis (yellow card) 70'	Report	Edjenguélé (yellow card) 20'; Nazlidis (yellow card) 53', (goal) 90+3'; Kola (yellow card) 66'; Jonathan (yellow card) 84'	Stadium: Nea Smyrni Stadium; Attendance: TBA; Referee: (Greece) A. Papapetrou; Man of the Match: (Greece) Thomas Nazlidis

31 October 2015 9	Veria	0 – 2	Olympiacos	Veria
19:30 (UTG+2)	Ibrahim (yellow card) 39', (yellow card) 87' (yellow-red card); Edjenguélé (yellow card) 59'; Neto (yellow card) 90'	Report	Ideye 55'; Durmaz 72'; Botia (yellow card) 85'; Siovas (yellow card) 90'	Stadium: Veria Stadium; Attendance: 2,451; Referee: (Greece) C. Mitsios; Man of the Match: (Spain) Roberto

8 November 2015 10	Levadiakos	1 – 1	Veria	Livadeia
17:15 (UTG+2)	Machairas (yellow card) 23'; Nicolaou (yellow card) 78'	Report	Poungouras (yellow card) 9'; Merebashvili 29', (yellow card) 45+2'; Malón (yellow card) 45'; Majewski (yellow card) 45+2'; Nazlidis (yellow card) 73', 75' (o.g.)	Stadium: Levadia Municipal Stadium; Attendance: 368; Referee: (Greece) D. Thanos; Man of the Match: (Greece) Vangelis Mantzios

23 November 2015 11	Veria	0 – 0	Iraklis	Veria
19:30 (UTG+2)	Majewski (yellow card) 84'	Report	Saramantas (yellow card) 30'; Boukouvalas (yellow card) 61'; Tsilianidis (yellow card) 74'	Stadium: Veria Stadium; Attendance: 1,385; Referee: (Greece) M. Voskakis; Man of the Match: (Australia) Kerem Bulut

29 November 2015 12	Platanias	0 – 0	Veria	Chania
17:15 (UTG+2)	Ramos (yellow card) 69'; Munafo (yellow card) 72'	Report	Edjenguélé (yellow card) 59'; Giannoulis (yellow card) 72'; Ostojić (yellow card) 89'	Stadium: Perivolia Municipal Stadium; Attendance: 1,561; Referee: (Greece) S. Tritsonis; Man of the Match: (Greece) Antonis Kokkalas

6 December 2015 13	Veria	0 – 1	Panathinaikos	Veria
19:30 (UTG+2)	Neto (yellow card) 34'; Giannoulis (yellow card) 40'; López (yellow card) 90+5'	Report	Sánchez (yellow card) 16'; Essien (yellow card) 22'; Karelis 86'	Stadium: Veria Stadium; Attendance: 1,035; Referee: (Greece) I. Delfakis; Man of the Match: (Greece) Nikos Karelis

13 December 2015 14	Skoda Xanthi	1 – 1	Veria	Xanthi
17:15 (UTG+2)	Nazlidis 40' (pen.); Poungouras (yellow card) 42'; Siontis (yellow card) 81'	Report	Nieto 42' (pen.), (yellow card) 57'; Triadis (yellow card) 74'	Stadium: Skoda Xanthi Arena; Attendance: 867; Referee: (Greece) A. Pappas; Man of the Match: (Greece) Luigi Cennamo

19 December 2015 15	Veria	1 – 0	Asteras Tripolis	Veria
17:15 (UTG+2)	Kola 22'; Ostojić (yellow card) 45+1'; Nazlidis (yellow card) 72'	Report	Goian (yellow card) 12'; Sankaré (yellow card) 28'; Mazza (yellow card) 71'; Giannoulis (yellow card) 86'	Stadium: Veria Stadium; Attendance: TBA; Referee: (Greece) S. Tritsonis; Man of the Match: TBA

2 January 2016 16	PAS Giannina	2 – 0	Veria	Ioannina
17:15 (UTG+2)				Stadium: Zosimades Stadium

09/10/11 January 2016 17	Veria	0 – 0	Panthrakikos	Veria
17:15 (UTG+2)				Stadium: Veria Stadium

17 January 2016 18	P.A.O.K.	2 – 1	Veria	Thessaloniki
17:15 (UTG+2)				Stadium: Toumba Stadium

24 January 2016 19	Veria	0 – 1	Panetolikos	Veria
17:15 (UTG+2)				Stadium: Veria Stadium

31 January 2016 20	AEK Athens	3 – 0	Veria	Athens
15:00 (UTG+2)		Report		Stadium: Olympic Stadium

7 February 2016 21	Veria	2 – 0	AEL Kalloni	Veria
17:15 (UTG+2)		Report		Stadium: Veria Stadium

13/14/15 February 2016 22	Atromitos	0 – 0	Veria	Athens
TBA (UTG+2)				Stadium: Peristeri Stadium

20/21/22 February 2016 23	Veria	1 – 1	Panionios	Veria
TBA (UTG+2)				Stadium: Veria Stadium

27/28/29 February 2016 24	Olympiacos	3 – 0	Veria	Piraeus
TBA (UTG+2)				Stadium: Karaiskaki Stadium

05/06/07 March 2016 25	Veria	v	Levadiakos	Veria
TBA (UTG+2)	0 – 0			Stadium: Veria Stadium; Attendance: 500

12/13/14 March 2016 26	Iraklis	1 – 1	Veria	Thessaloniki
TBA (UTG+2)				Stadium: Kaftanzoglio Stadium

19/20/21 March 2016 27	Veria	0 – 1	Platanias	Veria
TBA (UTG+2)				Stadium: Veria Stadium

02/03/04 April 2016 28	Panathinaikos	3 – 2	Veria	Athens
TBA (UTG+3)				Stadium: Leoforos Alexandras Stadium

10 April 2016 29	Veria	1 – 1	Skoda Xanthi	Veria
TBA (UTG+3)				Stadium: Veria Stadium

17 April 2016 30	Asteras Tripolis	2 – 1	Veria	Tripoli
TBA (UTG+3)				Stadium: Theodoros Kolokotronis Stadium

Last updated: 17 April 2016
Source: Superleague Greece
1. Matches of Matchday 4 originally were scheduled to be held in 19/20/21 September 2015, but due to the Elections to be held on 20 September 2015 Super League Greece, decided the Matchday 4 to be held 22/23 September 2015.

=== Tickets ===
Updated to games played on 28 September 2015, as published on superleaguegreece.net. Games are counted without games played behind closed gates.

Fixture	Team	Tickets	Average
1	PAS Giannina	827	
3	PAOK	3,557	
5	AEK Athens	3,348	
7	Atromitos	602	
9	Olympiacos	2,451	
11	Iraklis	1,385	
13	Panathinaikos	1,035	
15	Asteras Tripolis	586	
17	Panthrakikos	530	
19	Panetolikos	648	
21	AEL Kalloni	714	
23	Panionios	634	
25	Levadiakos	500	
27	Platanias	605	
29	Skoda Xanthi	587	
Overall	15	18,014	1,201

== League table ==
Pos	Team	Pld	W	D	L	GF	GA	GD	Pts	Qualification or relegation
12	Iraklis	30	8	11	11	24	32	−8	35 (Note: Head-to-head points: Panetolikos 4, Iraklis 1.)	
13	Skoda Xanthi	30	6	15	9	27	32	−5	33	
14	Veria	30	5	12	13	19	33	−14	27	
15	Panthrakikos (R)	30	3	8	19	18	58	−40	17	Relegation to the Football League
16	AEL Kalloni (R)	30	3	7	20	19	53	−34	16	Relegation to the Football League

Source: Super League Greece
Rules for classification: 1) Points; 2) Head-to-head points; 3) Head-to-head goal difference; 4) Goals scored; 5) Goals against; 6) Play-offs (neutral ground); 7) Draw.
(Note: Criteria 6 is only used if needed to decide champion, teams for relegation or teams for UEFA competitions).
(R) Relegated

=== Results summary ===
Overall								Home						Away					
Pld	W	D	L	GF	GA	GD	Pts	W	D	L	GF	GA	GD	W	D	L	GF	GA	GD
30	5	12	13	19	33	−14	27	2	6	7	7	14	−7	3	6	6	12	19	−7

Last updated: 29 January 2016.
Source: Super League Greece

=== Results by matchday ===
Round	1	2	3	4	5	6	7	8	9	10	11	12	13	14	15	16	17	18	19	20	21	22	23	24	25	26	27	28	29	30
Ground	H	A	H	A	H	A	H	A	H	A	H	A	H	A	H	A	H	A	H	A	H	A	H	A	H	A	H	A	H	A
Result	D	W	L	D	L	W	L	W	L	D	D	D	L	D	W	L	D	L	L	L	W	D	D	L	D	D	L	L	D	L
Position	7	5	10	10	14	8	9	8	8	8	9	12	12	12	10	12	11	14	14	14	14	14	13	14	14	14	14	14	14	14

Source: Super League Greece
A = Away; H = Home; W = Win; D = Draw; L = Loss

== Greek Cup ==
=== Second round ===
Pos	Team	Pld	W	D	L	GF	GA	GD	Pts	Qualification
1	Atromitos	3	2	1	0	8	4	+4	7	Round of 16
2	Veria	3	2	1	0	4	2	+2	7	Round of 16
3	Kallithea	3	1	0	2	4	6	−2	3	
4	Lamia	3	0	0	3	1	5	−4	0	

Source: epo.gr

Win Draw Loss Postponed

28 October 2015 1	Atromitos	2 – 2	Veria	Athens
15:00 (UTC+2)	Kivrakidis (yellow card) 50'; Godoy (yellow card) 69'; Kouros 85'; Lazaridis 87'; Marcelinho (red card) 90'	[ Report]	Majewski 45+1'. (yellow card) 69'; Kajkut 51' (pen.); Arce (yellow card) 54'; Jonathan (yellow card) 79'; Georgiadis (yellow card) 89'; Marangos (yellow card) 90'	Stadium: Peristeri Stadium; Attendance: 1.000; Referee: (Greece) A. Vatsios; Man of the Match: (Belarus) Andrey Harbunow

3 December 2015 2	Veria	1 – 0	Kallithea	Veria
15:00 (UTC+2)	Battión 19'; Ibrahim (yellow card) 20'	Report	Tegousis (yellow card) 16'; Katsikogiannis (yellow card) 41' (yellow-red card)	Stadium: Veria Stadium; Referee: (Greece) V. Gratsanis; Man of the Match:

16/17/18 December 2015 3	Lamia	0 – 1	Veria	Lamia
TBA (UTC+2)	Majewski 5'			Stadium: Lamia Stadium; Attendance: 1,000; Referee: (Greece) C. Mitsios; Man of the Match: (Poland) Radosław Majewski

=== Third round ===
5 January 2016 First leg	Veria	0 – 1	Iraklis	Veria
19:30 (UTC+2)				Stadium: Veria Stadium

12 January 2016 Second leg	Iraklis	1 – 0	Veria	Thessaloniki
15:00 (UTG+2)				Stadium: Kaftanzoglio Stadium

Last updated: 19 December 2015
Source: HFF

== Players Statistics ==
=== Overall ===
Updated as of 25 January 2016, 13:12 UTC.

No.	Pos.	Name	Age	League			Cup			Play-Offs			Total			Discipline	
No.	Pos.	Name	Age	Apps	Goals	Start	Apps	Goals	Start	Apps	Goals	Start	Apps	Goals	Start	Yellow card	Red card
Goalkeepers
1	GK	(Greece) Georgios Kantimiris	31	5	0	5	2	0	2	0	0	0	7	0	7	0	0
55	GK	(Spain) Jonathan López	34	10	0	10	1	0	1	0	0	0	11	0	11	2	0
96	GK	(Greece) Giorgos Vasileiadis	19	0	0	0	0	0	0	0	0	0	0	0	0	0	0
Defenders
2	DF	(Brazil) Darcy Neto	34	8	1	7	2	0	0	0	0	0	10	0	7	2	0
3	DF	(France) Cyril Kali	30	0	0	0	0	0	0	0	0	0	0	0	0	0	0
4	DF	(Spain) Raúl Bravo	34	0	0	0	0	0	0	0	0	0	0	0	0	0	0
5	DF	(Greece) Stelios Marangos	25	12	0	9	3	0	3	0	0	0	15	0	12	4	0
18	DF	(Spain) Iván Malón	28	9	0	9	2	0	2	0	0	0	11	0	11	1	0
23	DF	(France) William Edjenguélé	28	10	0	10	2	0	1	0	0	0	12	0	11	4	0
28	DF	(Greece) Vaggelis Nastos	24	5	0	3	2	0	2	0	0	0	7	0	5	1	0
44	DF	(Greece) Achilleas Poungouras	19	9	0	8	2	0	2	0	0	0	11	0	10	1	0
Midfielders
6	MF	(Argentina) Roberto Battión	32	4	0	3	1	1	1	0	0	0	5	1	4	0	0
7	MF	(Greece) Giorgos Georgiadis	26	4	0	2	2	0	2	0	0	0	6	0	4	0	0
8	MF	(Serbia) Branko Ostojić	31	2	0	1	0	0	0	0	0	0	0	0	0	0	0
11	MF	(Georgia (country)) Giorgi Merebashvili	28	9	1	4	2	0	2	0	0	0	11	1	6	1	0
13	MF	(Comoros) Mohamed Youssouf	27	9	0	5	2	0	1	0	0	0	11	0	6	0	0
15	MF	(Mexico) Pedro Arce	22	7	0	7	1	0	1	0	0	0	7	0	7	0	0
19	MF	(Greece) Anestis Karakostas	24	0	0	0	2	0	1	0	0	0	2	0	1	0	0
20	MF	(Greece) Dimitris Melikiotis	19	0	0	0	0	0	0	0	0	0	0	0	0	0	0
21	MF	(Greece) Alexandros Vergonis(c)	28	8	0	8	0	0	0	0	0	0	8	0	8	0	0
22	MF	(Greece) Stefanos Siontis	27	9	0	6	3	0	3	0	0	0	12	0	9	2	0
24	MF	(Norway) Abdisalam Ibrahim	24	7	0	5	2	0	2	0	0	0	9	0	7	3	1
25	MF	(Greece) Sotiris Balafas	28	0	0	0	0	0	0	0	0	0	0	0	0	0	0
31	MF	(Greece) Dimitris Giannoulis	19	12	0	12	1	0	0	0	0	0	13	0	12	3	0
86	MF	(Poland) Radosław Majewski	29	14	0	11	2	2	2	0	0	0	16	2	13	4	0
93	MF	(Algeria) Djamel Abdoun	29	10	3	10	0	0	0	0	0	0	10	3	10	1	0
Forwards
9	FW	(Greece) Thomas Nazlidis	27	15	4	13	2	0	0	0	0	0	17	4	13	4	0
14	FW	(Zambia) Rodgers Kola	26	12	1	4	2	0	2	0	0	0	14	1	6	1	0
17	FW	(Greece) Dimitris Melikiotis	19	0	0	0	0	0	0	0	0	0	0	0	0	0	0
77	FW	(Bosnia and Herzegovina) Saša Kajkut	31	8	0	5	2	1	2	0	0	0	10	1	7	0	0
80	FW	(Greece) Panagiotis Xoblios	19	1	0	0	0	0	0	0	0	0	0	0	1	0	

Source: Super League Greece

=== Goals ===
R	Player	Position	Super League	Greek Cup	Total	Notes
1	(Greece) Thomas Nazlidis	FW	5	0	5	
2	(Poland) Radosław Majewski	MF	2	2	4	
3	(Algeria) Djamel Abdoun	MF	3	0	3	
3	(Greece) Dimitris Anakoglou	MF	2	0	2	

Last updated: 17 April 2016
Source: Match reports in Competitive matches
0 shown as blank

=== Assists ===
R	Player	Position	Super League	Greek Cup	Total	Notes
1	(Poland) Radosław Majewski	MF	3	0	3	
2	(Greece) Thomas Nazlidis	FW	2	0	2	
2	(Zambia) Rodgers Kola	FW	2	0	2	

Last updated: 17 April 2016
Source: Match reports in Competitive matches
0 shown as blank

=== Best goal and MVP awards and nominees ===
Day	Opponent	H / A	Name	for	Status
1	PAS Giannina	H	(Greece) Thomas Nazlidis	MVP	Nominated
2	Panthrakikos	A	(Algeria) Djamel Abdoun	MVP	Nominated
5	A.E.K.	H	(Brazil) Neto	Best goal	Nominated
6	AEL Kalloni	A	(Algeria) Djamel Abdoun	MVP	Nominated
8	Panionios	A	(Greece) Thomas Nazlidis	MVP	Nominated

Source: Best of Super League 2015–16

== Infrastructure leagues ==
=== U20 ===
Win Draw Loss Postponed

Date	Opponents	H / A	Result
29 August 2015	PAS Giannina	H	1–0
10 October 2015	Panthrakikos	A	0–1
12 September 2015	PAOK	H	2–3
18 September 2015	Panetolikos	A	2–1
26 September 2015	AEK	H	1–4
3 October 2015	AEL Kalloni	A	1–2
18 October 2015	Atromitos	H	1–0
25 October 2015	Panionios	A	0–0
23 December 2015	Olympiacos	H	11:00
8 November 2015	Levadiakos	A	0–1
21 November 2015	Iraklis	H	2–3
28 November 2015	Platanias	A	2–1
5 December 2015	Panathinaikos	H	1–0
12 December 2015	Skoda Xanthi	A	2–1
5 December 2015	Asteras Tripoli	H	1–0

Pos	Club	Pld	Pts
6	AEK	13	22
7	Veria	14	22
8	Platanias	15	19

Pos = Position; Pld = Matches played; Pts = Points
Source: Super League U20

==== Goals ====
R	Player	Position	Super League U20
1	(Greece) Xoblios	FW	7
2	(Greece) Papadopoulos	MF	3
3	(Greece) Nauriniadis	MF	2
4	(Greece) Melikiotis	FW	1
4	(Greece) Nikolaidis	DF	1
4	(Greece) Papoutsidis	MF	1
4	(Greece) Roggotis	MF	1
4	(Greece) Toufas	MF	1

Last updated: 3 December 2015

=== U17 ===
Win Draw Loss Postponed

Date	Opponents	H / A	Result
1 November 2015	Panetolikos	H	0–2
26 September 2015	Skoda Xanthi	Α	1–1
3 October 2015	Iraklis	H	2–1
10 October 2015	PAOK	Α	3–0
17 October 2015	Panthrakikos	H	2–0
25 October 2015	PAS Giannina	Α	1–0
7 November 2015	Panetolikos	A	0–0
7 November 2015	Panetolikos	A	0–0
14 November 2015	Skoda Xanthi	Η	1–1
22 November 2015	Iraklis	A	0–0
29 November 2015	PAOK	H	1–2
5 December 2015	Panthrakikos	A	1–3
13 December 2015	PAS Giannina	H	1–1

Pos	Club	Pld	Pts
3	PAS Giannina	11	17
4	Veria	12	14
5	Iraklis	12	14

Pos = Position; Pld = Matches played; Pts = Points
Source: Super League U17

=== U15 ===
Win Draw Loss Postponed

Date	Opponents	H / A	Result
17 October 2015	Panthrakikos	H	1–0
25 October 2015	PAS Giannina	A	1–1
7 November 2015	Panetolikos	A	2–0
14 November 2015	Skoda Xanthi	H	0–2
22 November 2015	Iraklis	A	6–1
29 November 2015	PAOK	H	0–4
5 December 2015	Panthrakikos	A	0–0
13 December 2015	PAS Giannina	H	1–0
TBA	Panetolikos	H	TBA

Pos	Club	Pld	Pts
4	Iraklis	18	22
5	Veria	18	19
6	Panetolikos	18	17

Pos = Position; Pld = Matches played; Pts = Points
Source: Super League U15
