= 2016–17 Veria F.C. season =

Veria
2016–17 season
- Owner: Konstantinos Papadopoulos (93.53%)
- Chairman: Konstantinos Papadopoulos
- Manager: Alekos Vosniadis (7 July 2016–23 Sept 2016); Thomas Grafas (24 Sept 2016–26 Jan 2017); Ratko Dostanić (13 Feb 2017–30 Jun 2017)
- Stadium: Veria Stadium, Veria
- Super League: 16th (relegated)
- Greek Cup: Group stage
Home colours	Away colours	Third colours

Season 2016–17 is the 17th of Veria in Super League Greece. Veria will compete in the following competitions Super League and Greek Cup. The season covers the period from 1 July 2015 to 30 June 2016.

== Players ==
=== Squad information ===
No.	Name	Nationality	Position (s)	Date of Birth (Age)	Signed from	Note(s)
Goalkeepers
1	Georgios Kantimiris	(Greece)	GK	19 September 1982 (31)	(Greece) Fokikos	
30	Theodoros Venetikidis	(Greece)	GK	20 February 2001 (15)	Youth system	
55	Jonathan López	(Spain)	GK	16 April 1981 (35)	(Spain) Getafe	
Defenders
2	Stavros Vasilantonopoulos	(Greece)	RB/RM	28 January 1992 (24)	(Greece) AEK Athens	On loan until 30 June 2017
3	Mark Asigba	(Ghana)	RB/CB	7 July 1990 (26)	(Greece) Olympiacos	On loan until 30 June 2017
4	Christos Melissis	(Greece)	CB	1 December 1982 (33)	(Greece) Panthrakikos	
5	Stelios Marangos	(Greece)	CB/DM	4 May 1989 (27)	(Greece) Kerkyra	
6	Mohamadou Sissoko	(France)	CB	8 August 1988 (28)	(Turkey) Giresunspor	
16	Sofoklis Radis	(Greece)	CB	21 February 1998 (18)	Youth system	
18	Iván Malón	(Spain)	RB	26 August 1986 (30)	(Spain) Mirandés	
21	Cyril Kali	(France)	CB/RB	21 January 1984 (32)	(Greece) Panetolikos	
88	Giorgi Navalovski	(Georgia (country))	LB	28 June 1986 (30)	(Russia) SKA-Khabarovsk	
95	Giannis Charontakis	(Greece)	LB	7 August 1995 (21)	(Greece) Trikala	
Midfielders
7	Toni Calvo	(Spain)	L/RW	28 March 1987 (29)	(Cyprus) Anorthosis	
8	Antonio Tomás	(Spain)	CM	19 January 1985 (31)	(Spain) Numancia	
10	Pedro Arce	(Mexico)	CM/AM	25 November 1991 (25)	(Greece) Veria	
11	Kristijan Miljević	(Serbia)	LW	15 July 1992 (age 24)	(Greece) Lamia	
14	Sisinio	(Spain)	L/RW/AM	22 April 1986 (30)	(Poland) Lech Poznań	
17	Jeffrey Sarpong	(Netherlands)	RW	3 August 1988 (28)	(Australia) Wellington Phoenix	
19	Yiannis Papadopoulos	(Greece)	CM	9 March 1989 (27)	(Israel) Hapoel Kfar Saba	
21	Panagiotis Linardos	(Greece)	AM	7 August 1991 (25)	(Greece) Panegialios	
24	Alexandros Doris	(Greece)	AM	10 July 1999 (17)	Youth system	
25	Sotiris Balafas	(Greece)	DM	19 August 1986 (28)	(Ukraine) Hoverla	
26	Terry Antonis	(Australia)	CM	26 November 1993 (23)	(Greece) PAOK	On loan until 30 June 2017
71	Manolis Papasterianos	(Greece)	DM/CB	15 August 1987 (29)	(Greece) Xanthi	
Forwards
9	Pantelis Kapetanos	(Greece)	CF	8 June 1983 (33)	(Greece) Xanthi	
20	Dimitris Melikiotis	(Greece)	RW/CF	10 July 1996 (19)	Youth system	
23	Ioakeim Zyngeridis	(Greece)	CF	20 January 1999 (17)	Youth system	
28	Pablo Vitti	(Argentina)	ST	9 July 1985 (31)	(Thailand) Ratchaburi	
99	Billy Konstantinidis	(Australia)	CF	21 April 1986 (30)	(Greece) Aris	

=== Transfers ===
==== Summer Transfers ====
In: Note: Flags indicate national team as defined under FIFA eligibility rules; some limited exceptions apply. Players may hold more than one non-FIFA nationality.

No.	Pos.	Nation	Player
—	FW	ARG	Miguel Alba (from (Cyprus) Pafos)
—	FW	ARG	Pablo Vitti (from (Thailand) Ratchaburi)
—	MF	AUS	Terry Antonis (on loan from (Greece) PAOK)
—	FW	AUS	Billy Konstantinidis (from (Greece) Aris)
—	DF	BRA	Bruno Bertucci (from (Brazil) Caldense)
—	MF	ESP	Toni Calvo (from (Cyprus) Anorthosis)
—	MF	ESP	Antonio Tomás (from (Spain) Numancia)
—	MF	ESP	Sisinio González Martínez (from (Poland) Lech Poznań)
—	DF	FRA	Mohamadou Sissoko (from (Turkey) Giresunspor)
—	DF	GHA	Mark Asigba (on loan from (Greece) Olympiacos)
—	DF	GEO	Giorgi Navalovski (from (Russia) Khabarovsk)
—	DF	GRE	Giannis Charontakis (from (Greece) Trikala)
—	DF	GRE	Christos Melissis (from (Greece) Panthrakikos)
—	DF	GRE	Stavros Vasilantonopoulos (on loan from (Greece) AEK)
—	FW	GRE	Dimitris Mavrias (from (Greece) Anagennisi Karditsa)
—	MF	GRE	Yiannis Papadopoulos (from (Israel) Hapoel Kfar Saba)
—	MF	GRE	Manolis Papasterianos (from (Greece) Skoda Xanthi)
—	MF	GRE	Panagiotis Linardos (from (Greece) Panegialios)
—	FW	GRE	Pantelis Kapetanos (from (Greece) Skoda Xanthi)
—	MF	NED	Jeffrey Sarpong (from (Australia) Wellington Phoenix)
—	MF	NED	Alvin Fortes (from (Turkey) Boluspor)
—	MF	SRB	Kristijan Miljević (from (Greece) Lamia)

Out: Note: Flags indicate national team as defined under FIFA eligibility rules; some limited exceptions apply. Players may hold more than one non-FIFA nationality.

No.	Pos.	Nation	Player
—	MF	ALG	Djamel Abdoun (released)
—	MF	ARG	Roberto Battión (released)
—	FW	ARG	Miguel Alba (released)
—	DF	BRA	Neto (to (Greece) Aris)
—	DF	BRA	Bruno Bertucci (released)
—	MF	COM	Mohamed Youssouf (released)
—	DF	ESP	Raúl Bravo (loan return to (Greece) Aris)
—	DF	FRA	William Edjenguélé (released)
—	DF	GRE	Dimitris Giannoulis (loan return to (Greece) PAOK)
—	DF	GRE	Achilleas Poungouras (loan return to (Greece) PAOK)
—	DF	GRE	Vasilis Argiropoulos (released)
—	DF	GRE	Vasilis Giannopoulos (released)
—	MF	GRE	Kostas Papageorgiou (released)
—	MF	GRE	Anestis Karakostas (released)
—	MF	GRE	Dimitris Anakoglou (loan return to (Greece) AEK Athens)
—	FW	GRE	Panagiotis Xoblios (released)
—	FW	GRE	Thomas Nazlidis (to (Greece) AEL)
—	FW	GRE	Dimitrios Manos (to (Greece) OFI)
—	MF	NED	Alvin Fortes (released)
—	MF	POL	Radosław Majewski (to (Poland) Lech Poznań)
—	FW	ZAM	Rodgers Kola (loan return to (Belgium) Gent)
—	MF	SRB	Branko Ostojić (to (Greece) OFI)

==== Winter Transfers ====
In: Note: Flags indicate national team as defined under FIFA eligibility rules; some limited exceptions apply. Players may hold more than one non-FIFA nationality.

No.	Pos.	Nation	Player

Out: Note: Flags indicate national team as defined under FIFA eligibility rules; some limited exceptions apply. Players may hold more than one non-FIFA nationality.

No.	Pos.	Nation	Player

== Technical and medical staff ==
Technical staff
Head coach	(Serbia) Ratko Dostanić
Assistant coach	(Greece) TBA
Goalkeeping coach	(Greece) Dimitris Kottaridis
Fitness coach	(Greece) TBA
Fitness coach	(Serbia) Goran Guzijan
Team Manager	(Greece) Aris Veniopoulos
Interpreter	(Portugal) King Ferreira
Caregiver	(Greece) Thanasis Voulgaris
Caregiver	(Greece) Kosmas Rozintsis
Scouting staff
Scout	N/A
Medical staff
Physio	TBA
Masseur	(Greece) Fotis Konstantakos
Masseur	(Greece) Dimitris Lamprinidis
Masseur	(Greece) Charis Pantelidis
Pathologist	(Greece) Georgios Avramopoulos
Orthopedist	(Greece) Nikolaos Dimou
Urologist	(Greece) Georgios Minas
Surgeon	(Greece) Prodromos Isaakidis
Dentist	(Greece) Despοina Karvouna
Νutritionist	(Greece) Athanasios Topis

=== Veria Academy ===
Academy staff
Technical Director	(Greece) Nikos Karabiberis
General Manager	(Greece) Georgia Tsiamoura
U20 coach	(Greece) Apostolis Terzis
Assistant coach	(Greece) Germanos Safarikas
Goalkeeping coach	(Greece) Dimitris Kottaridis
U17 coach	(Greece) Dimitris Christoforidis
U15 coach	(Greece) Giannis Kapsaliaris

== Season Milestones ==
- Veria will compete in the 2016–17 Super League Greece for 6th consecutive season. This is the first time ever to happen in her history.
- On May 8, 2016, Karipidis stated in an interview for "Real News" that he's very close to seal a deal with a Chinese company on selling Veria's shares.
- Konstantinos Papadopoulos is the new major shareholder of Veria.
- Zisis Vryzas quit his post on 3 July 2016.
- Following Vryzas' departure, Eleftheropoulos quit his manager position along with Venetidis on 6 July 2016.
- Alekos Vosniadis was appointed as the new club manager on 8 July 2016.
- On 8 September 2016, Committee of Professional Sports didn't allow the transfer of the club's shares from Theodoros Karipidis to Konstantinos Papadopoulos, as a result Veria wasn't grant a permission of participation to the 2016–17 Super League Greece championship and they are facing a relegation penalty to Football League or even a ban from all the professional football championships.
- On 22 September 2016, Committee of Professional Sports granted to Veria, the permission of participating to 2016–17 Super League Greece as well as they approved the transfer shares of 93,53% from Theodoros Karipidis to Konstantinos Papadopoulos. Veria was fined €15,000 for their incomplete file on their first attempt.
- On 23 September 2016, Alekos Vosniadis left the club.
- On 24 September 2016, Thomas Grafas was appointed as the new club manager.

== Fixtures & Results ==
=== Overall ===
Competition	Started round	Current position / round	Final position / round	First match	Last match
Super League Greece	Regular season	TBP	TBP	10 September 2016	April 2017
Greek Cup	Second Round	TBP	TBP	October 2016	TBA

Last updated: 17 April 2016
Source: Competitions

=== Pre-season Friendlies ===
Win Draw Loss Upcoming fixture

16 July 2016 Exhibition game	Veria	1 – 1	Xanthi	Veria
18:30 (UTG+3)	Melikiotis 29'	Report	Ranos 58'	Stadium: Veria Stadium; Attendance: N/A; Referee: (Greece) D. Karantonis

19 July 2016 Exhibition game	Veria	1 – 0	Kerkyra	Naoussa
18:30 (UTG+3)	Alba 92' (pen.)	Report		Stadium: Koutsoufliani Training Center; Attendance: N/A; Referee: N/A

31 July 2016 Exhibition game	Veria	0 – 1	Apollon Smyrnis	Veria
19:00 (UTG+3)		Report	Diamantopoulos 43'	Stadium: Veria Stadium; Attendance: 600; Referee: N/A

2 August 2016 Exhibition game	Olympiacos Volos	1 – 1	Veria	Volos
19:00 (UTG+3)	Da Costa 25' (pen.)	Report	T. Papadopoulos 2'	Stadium: Xanthi FC Arena; Attendance: N/A; Referee: N/A

6 August 2016 Exhibition game	Xanthi	0 – 0	Veria	Xanthi
19:00 (UTG+3)		Report		Stadium: Xanthi FC Arena; Attendance: N/A; Referee: N/A

9 August 2016 Exhibition game	PAOK	3 – 0	Veria	Thessaloniki
20:00 (UTG+3)	Pereyra 29' 35'; Biseswar 62'	Report		Stadium: Toumba Stadium; Attendance: N/A; Referee: N/A

13 August 2016 Exhibition game	Kerkyra	1 – 1	Veria	Corfu
18:30 (UTG+3)	Kontos 4'	Report	Sissoko 11'	Stadium: Kerkyra Stadium; Attendance: N/A; Referee: N/A

21 August 2016 Exhibition game	Pas Giannina	0 – 0	Veria	Ioannina
18:30 (UTG+3)		Report		Stadium: Zosimades Stadium; Attendance: N/A; Referee: (Greece) C. Mitsios

27 August 2016 Exhibition game	Niki Volos	2 – 3	Veria	Volos
18:00 (UTG+3)	Koretas 38'; Metsi 93'	Report	Miljević 27'; Vitti 70'; Arce 88'	Stadium: Panthessaliko Stadium; Attendance: N/A; Referee: N/A

1 September 2016 Exhibition game	Veria	2 – 2	PAOK	Veria
20:00 (UTG+3)	Kapetanos 52'; Papadopoulos 56'	Report	Campos 27'; Athanasiadis 32'	Stadium: Veria Stadium; Attendance: 1000; Referee: (Greece) D. Karantonis

3 September 2016 Exhibition game	Kerkyra	2 – 1	Veria	Corfu
18:15 (UTG+3)	Thuram 68' (pen.); Adilehou 78'		Vitti (pen.), 25'	Stadium: Kerkyra Stadium; Attendance: N/A; Referee: (Greece) K. Tompros

5 September 2016 Exhibition game	Aiginiakos	4 – 0	Veria	Aiginio
17:30 (UTG+3)				Stadium: Municipal Stadium of Aiginio

=== Mid-season Friendlies ===
Win Draw Loss Upcoming fixture

9 October 2016 Exhibition game	Veria	v	Agrotikos Asteras	Veria
TBA (UTG+3)				Stadium: Tagarochori Training Center

=== Fixtures ===
Postponed 1	AEL	v	Veria	Larissa
TBA (UTG+2)				Stadium: AEL FC Arena; Referee: (Greece) TBA

Postponed 2	Veria	v	Iraklis	Veria
TBA (UTG+3)				Stadium: Veria Stadium; Referee: (Greece) TBA

11 September 2016 3	Olympiacos	6 – 1	Veria	Piraeus
20:30 (UTG+3)	Ideye 25' 61' 89'; Sebá 27'; Elyounoussi 41'; Milivojević 49'	Report	Marangos (yellow card) 10'; Kapetanos 74'	Stadium: Karaiskakis Stadium; Attendance: 20,213; Referee: (Greece) I. Delfakis; Man of the Match: (Nigeria) Brown Ideye

17 September 2016 4	Veria	0 – 2	AEK	Veria
20:30 (UTG+3)	Navalovski (yellow card) 45'	Report	Bakasetas 18'; Vargas (yellow card) 76' (goal) 87'	Stadium: Veria Stadium; Attendance: 3,111; Referee: (Greece) Ch. Kalogeropoulos; Man of the Match: (Greece) Anastasios Bakasetas

24 September 2016 5	Panionios	1 – 2	Veria	Athens
18:15 (UTG+3)	Siopis (yellow card) 45'; Ngog (yellow card) 74', (goal) 81'	Report	Vitti 17', (yellow card) 28' (goal) 45'; Arce (yellow card) 26'; Melikiotis (yellow card) 42'; Navalovski (yellow card) 80'; López (yellow card) 90+1'	Stadium: Nea Smyrni Stadium; Attendance: 1,508; Referee: (Greece) G Foukakis; Man of the Match: (Argentina) Pablo Vitti

2 October 2016 6	Veria	0 – 0	PAOK	Veria
16:00 (UTG+3)	Arce (yellow card) 52'	Report	Athanasiadis (yellow card) 45+4'; Cimirot (yellow card) 79'	Stadium: Veria Stadium; Attendance: TBA; Referee: (Greece) A. Evangelou; Man of the Match: (Greece) Stelios Marangos

16 October 2016 7	Atromitos	v	Veria	Athens
18:15 (UTG+3)				Stadium: Peristeri Stadium

24 October 2016 8	Veria	v	Panathinaikos	Veria
19:30 (UTG+3)				Stadium: Veria Stadium

30 October 2016 9	Veria	v	Platanias	Veria
19:30 (UTG+2)				Stadium: Veria Stadium

6 November 2016 10	Kerkyra	v	Veria	Corfu
17:15 (UTG+2)				Stadium: Kerkyra Municipal Stadium

19 November 2016 11	Veria	v	Levadiakos	Veria
17:15 (UTG+2)				Stadium: Veria Stadium

26 November 2016 12	PAS Giannina	v	Veria	Ioannina
15:00 (UTG+2)				Stadium: Zosimades Stadium

3 December 2016 13	Veria	v	Panetolikos	Veria
15:00 (UTG+2)				Stadium: Veria Stadium

10 December 2016 14	Asteras Tripolis	v	Veria	Tripoli
15:00 (UTG+2)				Stadium: Theodoros Kolokotronis Stadium

17 December 2016 15	Veria	v	Xanthi	Veria
15:00 (UTG+2)				Stadium: Veria Stadium

Last updated: 3 October 2016
Source: Superleague Greece

=== Tickets ===
Updated to games played in August 2016, as published on superleaguegreece.net. Games are counted without games played behind closed gates.

Fixture	Team	Tickets	Average
2	Iraklis	TBA	
4	AEK Athens	3,111	
6	PAOK	TBA	
8	Panathinaikos	TBA	
9	Platanias	TBA	
11	Levadiakos	TBA	
13	Panetolikos	TBA	
15	Xanthi	TBA	
Overall	15	TBA	TBA

== League table ==
Pos	Team	Pld	W	D	L	GF	GA	GD	Pts	Qualification or relegation
12	Asteras Tripolis	30	6	10	14	34	49	−15	28 (Note: Head-to-head points: Asteras Tripolis 4, AEL 1.)	
13	AEL	30	6	10	14	23	42	−19	28	
14	Levadiakos	30	6	8	16	27	49	−22	26	
15	Iraklis (Note: Iraklis were initially relegated to Football League due to the financial problems. However, the team decided not to participate in the second tier Football League, and play in the third tier Gamma Ethniki instead with the amateur team.) (R)	30	6	11	13	28	39	−11	29	Relegation to Gamma Ethniki
16	Veria (R)	30	5	7	18	23	56	−33	22	Relegation to Football League

Source: Super League Greece
Rules for classification: 1) Points; 2) Head-to-head points; 3) Head-to-head goal difference; 4) Goals scored; 5) Goals against; 6) Play-offs (neutral ground); 7) Draw.
(Note: Criteria 6 is only used if needed to decide champion, teams for relegation or teams for UEFA competitions).
(R) Relegated

=== Results summary ===
Overall								Home						Away					
Pld	W	D	L	GF	GA	GD	Pts	W	D	L	GF	GA	GD	W	D	L	GF	GA	GD
30	5	7	18	23	56	−33	22	4	5	6	17	18	−1	1	2	12	6	38	−32

Last updated: 2 October 2016.
Source: Superleague Greece

=== Results by matchday ===
Matchday	1	2	3	4	5	6
Ground	A	H	A	H	A	H
Result	P	P	L	L	W	D
Position			12	13	12	11

Updated to match(es) played on 2 October 2016. Source: Superleague Greece
A = Away; H = Home; W = Win; D = Draw; L = Loss

== Greek Cup ==
=== Second round ===
Pos	Team	Pld	W	D	L	GF	GA	GD	Pts	Qualification
1	Asteras Tripolis	3	2	1	0	8	4	+4	7	Round of 16
2	Aris	3	1	2	0	6	3	+3	5	Round of 16
3	Aiginiakos	3	1	0	2	2	7	−5	3	
4	Veria	3	0	1	2	0	2	−2	1	

Source: epo.gr

Win Draw Loss Postponed

25 October 2016 1	Asteras Tripolis	1 – 0	Veria	Tripoli
TBA (UTG+3)				Stadium: Theodoros Kolokotronis Stadium

29 November 2016 2	Veria	0 – 1	Aiginiakos	Veria
TBA (UTG+2)				Stadium: Veria Stadium

13 December 2016 3	Aris	0 – 0	Veria	Thessaloniki
TBA (UTG+2)				Stadium: Kleanthis Vikelidis Stadium

Last updated: 3 October 2016
Source: HFF

== Players Statistics ==
=== Overall ===
Updated as of 18 September 2016.

No.	Pos.	Name	Age	League			Cup			Play-Offs			Total			Discipline	
No.	Pos.	Name	Age	Apps	Goals	Start	Apps	Goals	Start	Apps	Goals	Start	Apps	Goals	Start	Yellow card	Red card
Goalkeepers
1	GK	(Greece) Georgios Kantimiris	31	0	0	0	0	0	0	0	0	0	0	0	0	0	0
30	GK	(Greece) Theodoros Venetikidis	15	0	0	0	0	0	0	0	0	0	0	0	0	0	0
96	GK	(Spain) Jonathan López	35	2	0	0	0	0	0	0	0	0	2	0	2	0	0
Defenders
2	DF	(Greece) Stavros Vasilantonopoulos	24	1	0	0	0	0	0	0	0	0	1	0	1	0	0
3	DF	(Ghana) Mark Nyaaba Asigba	26	0	0	0	0	0	0	0	0	0	0	0	0	0	0
4	DF	(Greece) Christos Melissis	33	1	0	0	0	0	0	0	0	0	1	0	1	0	0
5	DF	(Greece) Stelios Marangos(c)	26	2	0	0	0	0	0	0	0	0	2	0	2	1	0
6	DF	(France) Mohamadou Sissoko	28	0	0	0	0	0	0	0	0	0	0	0	0	0	0
16	DF	(Greece) Sofoklis Radis	18	0	0	0	0	0	0	0	0	0	0	0	0	0	0
18	DF	(Spain) Iván Malón	29	2	0	0	0	0	0	0	0	0	2	0	2	0	0
21	DF	(France) Cyril Kali	31	0	0	0	0	0	0	0	0	0	0	0	0	0	0
88	DF	(Georgia (country)) Giorgi Navalovski	30	1 (1)	0	0	0	0	0	0	0	0	2	0	1	1	0
Midfielders
7	MF	(Spain) Toni Calvo	29	1 (1)	0	0	0	0	0	0	0	0	2	0	1	0	0
8	MF	(Spain) Antonio Tomás	31	0	0	0	0	0	0	0	0	0	0	0	0	0	0
10	MF	(Mexico) Pedro Arce	25	1 (1)	0	0	0	0	0	0	0	0	2	0	1	0	0
11	MF	(Serbia) Kristijan Miljević	24	0 (1)	0	0	0	0	0	0	0	0	1	0	0	0	0
14	MF	(Spain) Sisinio	30	2	0	0	0	0	0	0	0	0	2	0	2	0	0
17	MF	(Netherlands) Jeffrey Sarpong	28	2	0	0	0	0	0	0	0	0	2	0	2	0	0
19	MF	(Greece) Yiannis Papadopoulos	27	2	0	0	0	0	0	0	0	0	2	0	2	0	0
21	MF	(Greece) Panagiotis Linardos	25	0	0	0	0	0	0	0	0	0	0	0	0	0	0
24	MF	(Greece) Alexandros Doris	25	0	0	0	0	0	0	0	0	0	0	0	0	0	0
25	MF	(Greece) Sotiris Balafas	30	1	0	0	0	0	0	0	0	0	1	0	1	0	0
26	MF	(Australia) Terry Antonis	23	0	0	0	0	0	0	0	0	0	0	0	0	0	0
71	MF	(Greece) Manolis Papasterianos	29	1	0	0	0	0	0	0	0	0	1	0	1	0	0
Forwards
9	FW	(Greece) Pantelis Kapetanos	33	2	1	0	0	0	0	0	0	0	2	1	2	0	0
20	FW	(Greece) Dimitris Melikiotis	20	0	0	0	0	0	0	0	0	0	0	0	0	0	0
23	FW	(Greece) Ioakeim Zyngeridis	17	0	0	0	0	0	0	0	0	0	0	0	0	0	0
28	FW	(Argentina) Pablo Vitti	31	0 (2)	0	0	0	0	0	0	0	0	2	0	0	0	0
99	FW	(Australia) Billy Konstantinidis	30	0	0	0	0	0	0	0	0	0	0	0	0	0	0

Source: Superleague Greece

=== Goals ===
R	Player	Position	Super League	Greek Cup	Total	Notes
1	(Argentina) Pablo Vitti	FW	2	0	2	
2	(Greece) Pantelis Kapetanos	FW	1	0	1	

Last updated: 28 September 2016
Source: Match reports in Competitive matches
0 shown as blank

=== Assists ===
R	Player	Position	Super League	Greek Cup	Total	Notes
1	(Georgia (country)) Giorgi Navalovski	DF	2	0	2	
2	(Mexico) Pedro Arce	MF	1	0	1	

Last updated: 28 September 2016
Source: Match reports in Competitive matches
0 shown as blank

=== Best goal and MVP awards and nominees ===
Day	Opponent	H / A	Name	for	Status
3	Olympiacos	A	(Greece) Pantelis Kapetanos	Best goal	Nominated
5	Paninios	A	(Argentina) Pablo Vitti	MVP & Best goal	Nominated

Source: Best of Superleague 2016–2017
