= Pedro Arce =

Pedro Arce may refer to:

- Pedro Miguel Arce (1976–2022), Nicaraguan actor
- Pedro Arce (Mexican footballer) (born 1991), Mexican football attacking midfielder
- Pedro Arce (Paraguayan footballer) (born 1991), Paraguayan football midfielder
