= Kennedy Igboananike =

Nigerian footballer

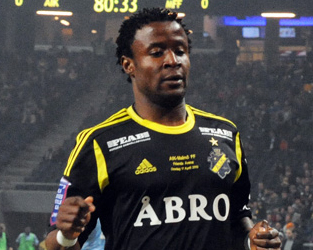
- Igboananike playing for AIK

Personal information
- Full name: Chibuike Kennedy Igboananike
- Date of birth: 26 February 1989 (age 37)
- Place of birth: Nri-Igbo, Nigeria
- Height: 1.75 m (5 ft 9 in)
- Position: Forward

Team information
- Current team: IFK Haninge

Youth career
- 2006: Dynamo Football Academy
- 2007: Djurgårdens IF

Senior career*
Years	Team	Apps	(Gls)
2007	Djurgårdens IF	2	(0)
2008–2009	Vasalund	51	(30)
2010–2012	Djurgårdens IF	60	(15)
2013–2014	AIK	55	(19)
2015–2016	Chicago Fire	49	(11)
2016	D.C. United	7	(1)
2017	Veria	0	(0)
2017–2019	Örebro SK	47	(18)
2019	Al-Hazm	15	(4)
2020	IK Sirius	4	(0)
2021	IFK Mariehamn	19	(1)
2022–	IFK Haninge	8	(0)
- * Club domestic league appearances and goals as of 00:03, 18 February 2023 (UTC)

Kennedy Igboananike (born 26 February 1989) is a Nigerian professional footballer who plays as a striker for Swedish club IFK Haninge.

== Career ==
=== Sweden ===
Igboananike began his career with Dynamos Football Academy. He joined Djurgårdens IF in 2007 but only played twice during his time at the club. He played his first game on 19 June 2007 against Hammarby IF. He moved on trial to IK Brage but was not signed. In January 2008 he was contracted with Vasalunds IF and went on to become the top scorer of the Division 1 Norra in 2008.

As of the 2010 season he returned to Djurgården. He scored in his comeback away against BK Häcken, when he equalized the score to 1–1 in the match which Djurgården ultimately lost 2–1. Igboananike was Djurgården's top scorer in the 2010 season, scoring nine goals in 27 games.

On 15 November 2012, Stockholm rivals AIK announced they had signed a three-year deal with Igboainanike. He got the number 21 jersey, because the number 7 was occupied by midfielder Helgi Daníelsson. During one of Kennedy's first games, against Gefle IF he scored a 96th-minute winner for his new club.

=== United States ===
==== Chicago Fire ====
Igboananike signed with Chicago Fire SC of Major League Soccer on 2 December 2014 to a Designated Player contract. Igboananike scored his first goal for Chicago on 30 May 2015, in a 3–0 win against the Montreal Impact. His goal against the Philadelphia Union on 2 April 2016 lead to Chicago's first win in the 2016 season. He played with the Fire during the 2015 season and into the first half of the 2016 season.

==== D.C. United ====
D.C. United acquired Igboananike on 29 July 2016 in an exchange with the Fire, trading targeted allocation money and a third-round pick in the 2019 MLS SuperDraft. Igboananike made his debut with his new club two days later in a 1–1 draw with Montreal Impact. He scored his only goal for D.C. United against Orlando City SC on 23 October 2016. He scored in the 77th minute, the goal was assisted by Julian Büscher and the game ended in a 2–4 defeat.

Igboananike's option was declined by United at the end of the 2016 season. His rights were then traded to Portland Timbers in exchange for a 2017 MLS SuperDraft pick. Igboananike played a total of seven league games for United, and scored only one goal.

=== Greece ===
On 7 February 2017, Igboananike joined Super League Greece side Veria on a contract until the end of the 2016–17 season.

=== Return to Sweden ===
On 6 March 2017, only 1 month after he had signed for Veria, Igboananike signed for Swedish club Örebro on a free transfer.

=== Saudi Arabia ===
On 9 January 2019, Al-Hazm has signed Kennedy for one seasons from Örebro. He was left without a club on 1 July 2019.

=== IK Sirius ===
Igboananike joined Swedish club, IK Sirius on 17 January 2020.

In March 2021, Igboananike joined Tajikistan Higher League club Istiklol on trial.

=== IFK Mariehamn ===
Following his trial with Istiklol, Igboananike signed for IFK Mariehamn on 19 March 2021.

=== IFK Haninge ===
On 15 March 2022, Igboananike returned to Sweden once again and signed with IFK Haninge in the third-tier Ettan Norra for the 2022 season, with an option to extend for 2023.

== Career statistics ==
As of 15 October 2017.

Appearances and goals by club, season and competition
Club	Season	League			Cup (Note: Includes Svenska Cupen, US Open Cup, Greek Cup.)		Continental		Total	
Club	Season	Division	Apps	Goals	Apps	Goals	Apps	Goals	Apps	Goals
Djurgårdens IF	2007	Allsvenskan	2	0	0	0	—		2	0
Vasalunds IF	2008	Division 1	25	18			—		25	18
Vasalunds IF	2009	Superettan	26	12			—		26	12
Djurgårdens IF	2010	Allsvenskan	27	9	1	0	—		28	9
Djurgårdens IF	2011	Allsvenskan	28	6	2	1	—		30	7
Djurgårdens IF	2012	Allsvenskan	5	0	0	0	—		5	0
AIK	2013	Allsvenskan	29	14	3	2	—		32	16
AIK	2014	Allsvenskan	26	5	2	0	3	1	31	6
Örebro SK	2017	Allsvenskan	23	9	0	0	—		21	8
Chicago Fire	2015	Major League Soccer	31	7	3	2	—		34	9
Chicago Fire	2016	Major League Soccer	18	4	3	0	—		21	4
D.C. United	2016	Major League Soccer	7	1	0	0	—		7	1
Veria	2016–17	Super League Greece	0	0	0	0	—		0	0
Career total			245	84	14	5	3	1	262	90

== Honours ==
Individual

- Division 1 Norra Topscorer: 2008
