= Sachpekidis =

Sachpekidis is a surname. Notable people with the surname include:

- Filip Sachpekidis (born 1997), Swedish footballer
- Mischell Miljević-Sachpekidis (born 1989), Swedish-Serb footballer
