= 2012 Greek Football Cup final =

2012 Greek Cup final
- Event: 2011–12 Greek Football Cup
Atromitos	Olympiacos
1	2
- After extra time
- Date: 28 April 2012
- Venue: Olympic Stadium, Marousi, Athens
- Man of the Match: Rafik Djebbour (Olympiacos)
- Referee: Ilias Spathas (Piraeus)
- Attendance: 41,500
- Weather: Partly Cloudy; 15 °C (59 °F); 82% humidity

The 2012 Greek Cup final was the 68th final of the Greek Cup. It took place on 28 April 2012 at the Olympic Stadium. The contesting teams were Atromitos and Olympiacos. It was the second consecutive Greek Cup final for Atromitos in their 89 years of existence and Olympiacos' thirty sixth Greek Cup final of their 87-year history.

== Venue ==
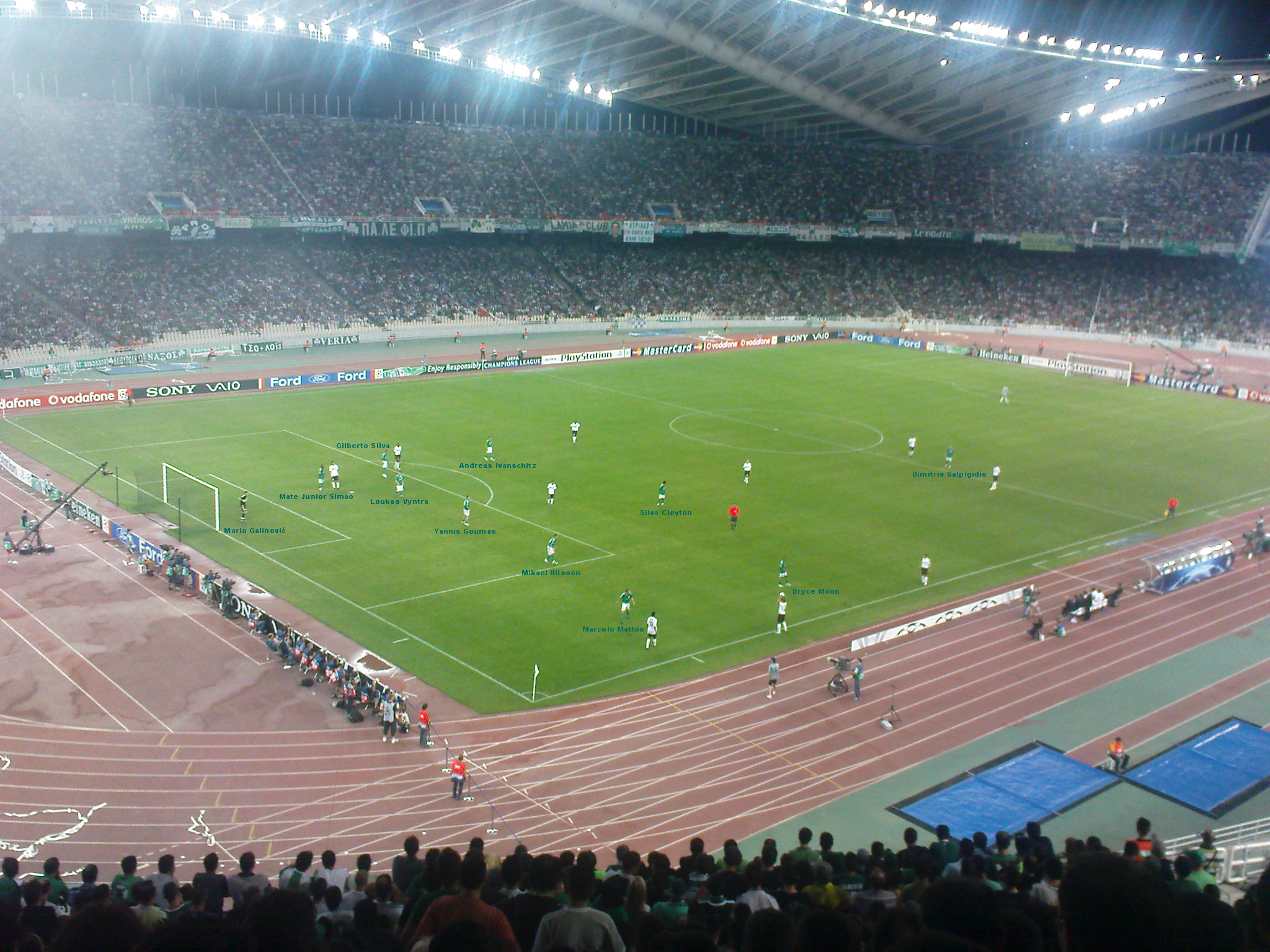
Athens Olympic Stadium.

This was the nineteenth Greek Cup final held at the Athens Olympic Stadium.

The Athens Olympic Stadium was built in 1982 and renovated once in 2004. The stadium is used as a venue for AEK Athens and Panathinaikos and was used for Olympiacos and Greece on various occasions. Its current capacity is 69,618 and it hosted three European Cup/UEFA Champions League finals in 1983, 1994 and 2007, a UEFA Cup Winners' Cup final in 1987, the 1991 Mediterranean Games and the 2004 Summer Olympics.

== Background ==
Atromitos had reached the Greek Cup final once previously, in 2011, where they had lost to AEK Athens by 3–0.

Olympiacos had reached the Greek Cup final thirty-five times, winning twenty-four of them. The last time that they had played in a final was in 2009, where they had won against AEK Athens by 15–14 in a penalty shootout, which came after a 4–4 draw at the end of the extra time.

The two teams had never before met each other in a Cup final.

== Route to the final ==
Atromitos				Round	Olympiacos			
Opponent	Agg.	1st leg	2nd leg		Opponent	Agg.	1st leg	2nd leg
Annagenisi Epanomi	3–2 (A)			Round of 32	Pierikos	3–1 (A)		
Aris	2–1 (H)			Round of 16	Thrasyvoulos	3–0 (H)		
PAOK	2–1 (a.e.t.) (A)			Quarter-finals	Panionios	4–0 (H)		
Asteras Tripolis	2–2 (a)	0–0 (H)	2–2 (A)	Semi-finals	OFI	1–0	1–0 (H)	0–0 (A)

== Match ==
=== Details ===
28 April 2012
20:30 EEST

Atromitos	1–2 (a.e.t.)	Olympiacos
Iglesias 76'	Report	Djebbour 29'; Fuster 119'

Olympic Stadium, Marousi
Attendance: 41,500
Referee: Ilias Spathas (Piraeus)

Atromitos	Olympiacos

GK	1	(Cameroon) Charles Itandje
RB	2	(Greece) Giannis Skondras (c)	(yellow card) 102'
CB	5	(England) Wayne Thomas	(yellow card) 112'
CB	6	(Greece) Sokratis Fytanidis	(yellow card) 36'
LB	3	(Greece) Vangelis Ikonomou	(yellow card) 15'
DM	17	(Argentina) Matías Iglesias	(yellow card) 63'	(substituted off) 98'
CM	9	(Brazil) Luiz Brito		(substituted off) 77'
RM	21	(Greece) Elini Dimoutsos
LM	8	(Germany) Denis Epstein
AM	7	(Greece) Andreas Tatos		(substituted off) 63'
CF	23	(Greece) Kostas Mitroglou
Substitutes:
GK	30	(Croatia) Velimir Radman
DF	13	(Greece) Vangelis Nastos
DF	24	(Angola) Francisco Zuela		(substituted on) 98'
MF	16	(Greece) Panagiotis Ballas
MF	19	(Greece) Stelios Sfakianakis		(substituted on) 77'
FW	10	(Greece) Thanasis Karagounis
FW	20	(Greece) Anastasios Karamanos		(substituted on) 63'
Manager:
(Greece) Georgios Donis

GK	1	(Northern Ireland) Roy Carroll
RB	35	(Greece) Vasilis Torosidis (c)
CB	4	(Sweden) Olof Mellberg
CB	21	(Greece) Avraam Papadopoulos
LB	20	(Greece) José Holebas	(yellow card) 44'
DM	31	(Spain) Pablo Orbaiz	(yellow card) 68'
CM	2	(Greece) Giannis Maniatis		(substituted off) 103'
CM	77	(Cameroon) Jean Makoun		(substituted off) 83'
RW	93	(Algeria) Djamel Abdoun		(substituted off) 72'
LW	14	(Belgium) Kevin Mirallas
CF	10	(Algeria) Rafik Djebbour
Substitutes:
GK	42	(Hungary) Balázs Megyeri
DF	3	(France) François Modesto		(substituted on) 103'
DF	23	(Spain) Iván Marcano
DF	92	(Greece) Ioannis Potouridis
MF	18	(Greece) Giannis Fetfatzidis		(substituted on) 72'
MF	19	(Spain) David Fuster		(substituted on) 83'
FW	25	(Greece) Dimitrios Diamantakos
Manager:
(Spain) Ernesto Valverde

Man of the Match:
(Algeria) Rafik Djebbour (Olympiacos)

Assistant referees:
Dimitrios Saraidaris (Thessaloniki)
Leonidas Vasileiadis (Thessaloniki)
Fourth official:
Athanasios Giachos (Chios)
Match observer:
Michail Kalathenos (Dodecanese)

Match rules

- 90 minutes
- 30 minutes of extra time if necessary
- Penalty shootout if scores still level
- Seven named substitutes
- Maximum of three substitutions
