= Mischell Miljević-Sachpekidis =

Swedish Serb footballer

Mischell Miljević
Personal information
- Full name: Mischell Miljević-Sachpekidis
- Date of birth: 30 October 1989 (age 37)
- Place of birth: Norrköping, Sweden
- Height: 1.80 m (5 ft 11 in)
- Position: Left midfielder

Team information
- Current team: Edessa Syrianska KIF

Senior career*
Years	Team	Apps	(Gls)
–2007	Lindö FF		
2008–2010	Sylvia Norrköping	27	(3)
2011–2012	Sleipner	18	(1)
2013	Panserraikos	4	(0)
2013	Vataniakos	9	(0)
2014	Radnik Surdulica	1	(0)
2015	Assyriska IF	7	(1)
2017-2018	Apollon Solna	23	(9)
2019	Edessa Syrianska KIF	8	(2)
2020-2021	Nacka Iliria	17	(0)
2022-	Edessa Syrianska KIF	21	(0)
- * Club domestic league appearances and goals as of 26 December 2024

Mischell Miljević-Sachpekidis (Serbian Cyrillic: Мишел Миљевић-Схпекидис; born 30 October 1989) is a Swedish Serb football midfielder who plays for Edessa Syrianska KIF.

His father is Serb, and mother is Greek. His brother Kristijan is also footballer.

== Honours ==
Radnik Surdulica

- Serbian First League: 2014–15
