= Radosław Majewski =

Polish footballer (born 1986)

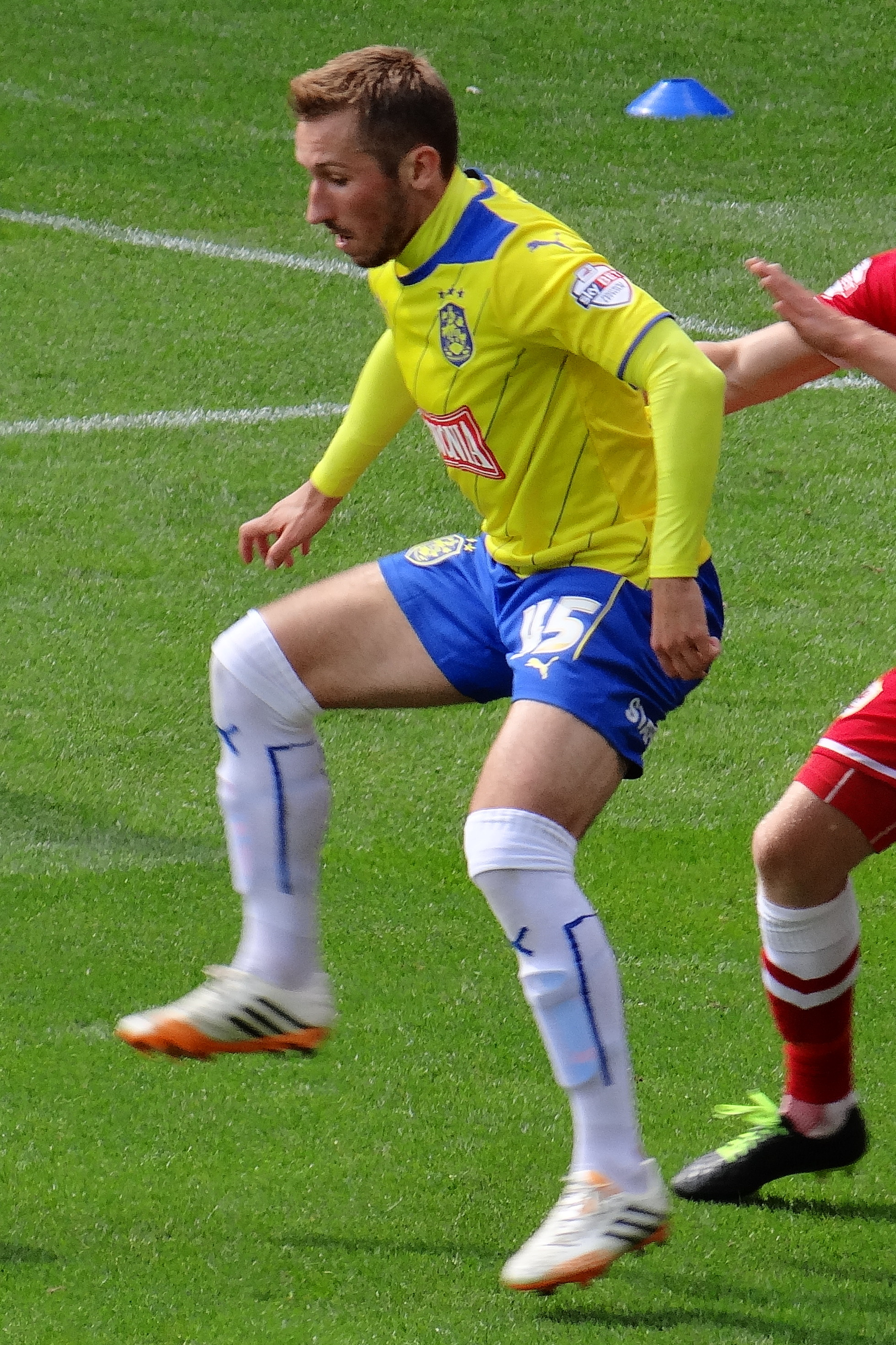
- Majewski playing for Huddersfield Town in 2014

Personal information
- Full name: Radosław Majewski
- Date of birth: 15 December 1986 (age 39)
- Place of birth: Pruszków, Poland
- Height: 1.70 m (5 ft 7 in)
- Position: Midfielder

Team information
- Current team: Pogoń Grodzisk Mazowiecki
- Number: 9

Senior career*
Years	Team	Apps	(Gls)
2002–2007	Znicz Pruszków		
2007–2008	Dyskobolia Grodzisk	42	(4)
2008–2010	Polonia Warsaw	29	(1)
2009–2010	→ Nottingham Forest (loan)	35	(3)
2010–2015	Nottingham Forest	109	(13)
2014–2015	→ Huddersfield Town (loan)	8	(0)
2015–2016	Veria	29	(2)
2016–2018	Lech Poznań	66	(10)
2018–2019	Pogoń Szczecin	36	(8)
2019–2020	Western Sydney Wanderers	0	(0)
2020–2023	Wieczysta Kraków	87	(85)
2024–2026	Znicz Pruszków	75	(19)
2026–	Pogoń Grodzisk Mazowiecki	0	(0)

International career
	Poland U21	9	(1)
	Poland U23	2	(0)
2007–2013	Poland	9	(0)
- * Club domestic league appearances and goals as of 16:28, 26 May 2026 (UTC)

Radosław Majewski (Polish pronunciation: [raˈdɔswaf maˈjɛfski]; born 15 December 1986) is a Polish professional footballer who plays as an attacking midfielder for I liga club Pogoń Grodzisk Mazowiecki. He also played for the Poland national team.

== Club career ==
=== Early career ===
Majewski was born in Pruszków, Masovian Voivodeship. He began his career at his hometown club Znicz Pruszków. In 2007, he was signed by Dyskobolia Grodzisk Wielkopolski following an impressive performance against the then-Ekstraklasa club. In 2008, he moved to the Polish capital due to Dyskobolia's Polonia Warsaw. However, after some lackluster performances and criticism of his off-pitch lifestyle, the club decided to loan him to Nottingham Forest with the hope that the move would mature him and help him rediscover the form that got him into the Polish international set up in the years prior.

=== Nottingham Forest ===
Majewski joined Championship club Nottingham Forest on a season-long loan on 23 July 2009. Forest paid a fee of £130,000 for his services and agreed a fee of roughly £1 million if they wished to sign him on a permanent transfer at any point during the loan. He impressed immediately in red and white, scoring a 30-yard drive in the first minute for Forest against arch-rivals Derby in August. His tenacity, intelligence and eye for a killer pass had not gone un-noticed by the Forest management, and in March it was revealed that they were looking to make the deal permanent. On 25 August, Majewski scored his first goal for Forest, giving Nottingham Forest victory in extra time of a League Cup match against Middlesbrough. His first league goal came in the first minute of the match against bitter East Midlands rivals Derby County, where he smashed an 'unstoppable' shot in from the edge of the area, on 29 August 2009, with Forest winning 3–2. On 8 January 2010, Majewski scored his fourth goal of the season in a stunning 3–1 away win at West Bromwich Albion to send Forest into second in the Championship.

Majewski's permanent move to Nottingham Forest was confirmed on 5 May 2010. In the 2010–11 season, Majewski made 28 appearances, limited by the good form of Lewis McGugan keeping him out of the team. Majewski scored two league goals, one against Swansea City and one against Coventry City. In the 2011–12 season, Majewski scored six league goals. The first was in a 3–2 away defeat to Southampton, and the second was a half-volley that proved to be the winner against Blackpool, in a performance that saw him and team-mate Wes Morgan feature in Sky Sports' Football League Team of the Week. On 31 March 2012, in an away league match against Crystal Palace, Majewski scored a hat-trick, in a performance that saw him named in Sky Sports Football League Team of the Week. He followed that up with a late consolation goal in a 2–1 away defeat to Hull City.

Majewski did not score in the 2012–13 season until, much like the previous season, he scored a hat-trick against Huddersfield Town a game which Forest won 6–1. He continued to flourish under the reappointed of Billy Davies with goals coming away from home at Sheffield Wednesday and Charlton Athletic. His form helped him earn a place in Poland national team World Cup qualifiers against Ukraine and San Marino.

=== Huddersfield Town (loan) ===
On 29 July 2014, Majewski joined fellow Championship club Huddersfield Town on a season-long loan, wearing the number 45 shirt. He made his début for the Terriers in the 4–0 defeat by AFC Bournemouth on 9 August.

=== Veria ===
After being released on a free transfer from Nottingham Forest, Majewski was approached by the Super League Greece club Veria, which at the same time were ready to sign to their squad the Algerian winger and former teammate of Majewski, Djamel Abdoun. Veria's interest was expressed firstly on 7 August 2015. Five days later, on 7 August 2015, Majewski signed a two-year contract with the Greek club. Majewski debuted for Veria on 23 August 2015 against PAS Giannina.

Majewski scored his first goal for Veria during a Greek Cup match against Atromitos with a powerful shot outside the six-yard box.

=== Lech Poznań ===
Majewski joined Lech Poznań in 2016, signing a contract stated to expire on 30 June 2019.

=== Pogoń Szczecin ===
Majewski signed for Pogon Szczecin in 2018. However, he suffered an injury during his time there.

=== Western Sydney Wanderers ===
Majewski signed for A-League club Western Sydney Wanderers on 14 June 2019 on a one-year contract. After making 3 appearances in the FFA Cup including scoring a goal and providing two assists in a 7–1 win over Sydney United, he suffered an anterior cruciate ligament and medial collateral ligament injury in his right knee during training following a collision with Dylan McGowan. He returned to Poland for treatment, then returned to Australia only for the COVID-19 pandemic to shut down the A-League. Majewski later spoke of the incident in an interview with the Polish media that called McGowan a "moron" and suggested it was a malicious tackle, a claim McGowan denied.

=== Wieczysta Kraków ===
After failing to feature in an A-League match for Western Sydney Wanderers, Majewski signed for sixth tier Polish club, Wieczysta Kraków.

=== Return to Znicz ===
On 31 January 2024, after previously training with them occasionally throughout winter, Majewski rejoined Znicz Pruszków, making a return to his hometown club after 16 years. He ended the season with one goal and seven assists in fourteen games, and was nominated for the I liga Player of the Month award in April 2024. He extended his contract for another year in July 2024. After Znicz's relegation at the end of the 2025–26 season, Majewski announced he would leave the club in June 2026. During his second stint with Znicz, he scored 19 goals and assisted 25 more in 75 league appearances.

=== Pogoń Grodzisk Mazowiecki ===
On 19 June 2026, Majewski joined I liga side Pogoń Grodzisk Mazowiecki. He became I liga Player of the Month in July & August 2026.

== International career ==
Majewski made his international debut for Poland on 15 December 2007, his 21st birthday, in a 1–0 friendly win over Bosnia and Herzegovina. This was the first of his nine caps.

== Personal life ==
Majewski participated in the 2024 Polish local elections and successfully ran for a seat on the Pruszków city council, receiving 4,76% of all votes in his constituency.

== Career statistics ==
=== Club ===
As of match played 24 May 2026

Appearances and goals by club, season and competition
Club	Season	League			National cup (Note: Includes Polish Cup, FA Cup, Greek Cup)		League cup (Note: Includes Ekstraklasa Cup, EFL Cup)		Other		Total	
Club	Season	Division	Apps	Goals	Apps	Goals	Apps	Goals	Apps	Goals	Apps	Goals
Dyskobolia Grodzisk	2006–07	Ekstraklasa	14	0	3	1	8	0	—		25	1
Dyskobolia Grodzisk	2007–08	Ekstraklasa	28	4	6	0	5	0	6 (Note: Appearances in UEFA Cup)	0	45	4
Dyskobolia Grodzisk	Total		42	4	9	1	13	0	6	0	70	5
Polonia Warsaw	2008–09	Ekstraklasa	29	1	6	0	3	0	—		38	1
Polonia Warsaw	2009–10	Ekstraklasa	0	0	0	0	—		3 (Note: Appearances in UEFA Europa League)	0	3	0
Polonia Warsaw	Total		29	1	6	0	3	0	3	0	41	1
Nottingham Forest (loan)	2009–10	Championship	35	3	1	0	2	1	2 (Note: Appearances in Football League play-offs)	0	40	4
Nottingham Forest	2010–11	Championship	26	2	1	0	0	0	1	0	28	2
Nottingham Forest	2011–12	Championship	28	6	0	0	3	1	—		31	7
Nottingham Forest	2012–13	Championship	31	5	1	0	2	0	—		34	5
Nottingham Forest	2013–14	Championship	24	0	3	0	2	1	—		29	1
Nottingham Forest	Total		144	16	6	0	9	3	3	0	162	19
Huddersfield Town (loan)	2014–15	Championship	8	0	0	0	1	0	—		9	0
Veria	2015–16	Super League Greece	29	2	4	2	0	0	—		33	4
Lech Poznań	2016–17	Ekstraklasa	37	8	6	2	—		1 (Note: Appearance in Polish Super Cup)	0	44	10
Lech Poznań	2017–18	Ekstraklasa	29	2	1	0	—		5	2	35	4
Lech Poznań	Total		66	10	7	2	—		6	2	79	14
Pogoń Szczecin	2018–19	Ekstraklasa	36	8	1	0	—		—		37	8
Western Sydney Wanderers	2019–20	A-League Men	0	0	3	1	—		—		3	1
Wieczysta Kraków	2020–21	Regional league Krak. II	24	43	—		—		—		24	43
Wieczysta Kraków	2021–22	IV liga Lesser Poland	32	30	2	0	—		—		34	30
Wieczysta Kraków	2022–23	III liga, gr. IV	31	12	1	0	—		—		32	12
Wieczysta Kraków	Total		87	85	3	0	—		—		90	85
Znicz Pruszków	2023–24	I liga	14	1	—		—		—		14	1
Znicz Pruszków	2024–25	I liga	30	7	0	0	—		—		30	7
Znicz Pruszków	2025–26	I liga	31	11	1	0	—		—		32	11
Znicz Pruszków	Total		75	19	1	0	—		—		76	19
Pogoń Grodzisk Mazowiecki	2026–27	I liga	0	0	0	0	—		—		0	0
Career total			516	145	40	6	26	3	18	2	600	156

=== International ===
Appearances and goals by national team and year
National team	Year	Apps	Goals
Poland
Poland	2007	1	0
Poland	2008	4	0
Poland	2009	1	0
Poland	2010	2	0
Poland	2013	1	0
Total		9	0

== Honours ==
Dyskobolia Grodzisk

- Polish Cup: 2006–07
- Ekstraklasa Cup: 2006–07, 2007–08

Lech Poznań

- Polish Super Cup: 2016

Wieczysta Kraków

- IV liga Lesser Poland West: 2021–22
- Regional league, group: Kraków II: 2020–21
- Polish Cup (Lesser Poland regionals): 2020–21, 2021–22
- Polish Cup (Kraków regionals): 2020–21

Individual

- Polish Newcomer of the Year: 2007
- I liga Assist of the Season: 2024–25
