= Kristijan Miljević =

Swedish-born Serbian footballer

Personal information
- Full name: Christian Miljević-Sachpekidis
- Date of birth: 15 July 1992 (age 34)
- Place of birth: Norrköping, Sweden
- Height: 1.81 m (5 ft 11 1/2 in)
- Position: Left winger

Senior career*
Years	Team	Apps	(Gls)
2007–2008	IF Sylvia		
2008–2010	PAOK	1	(0)
2011–2012	Brescia	0	(0)
2012–2014	Levadiakos	11	(0)
2013–2014	→ Paniliakos (loan)	15	(1)
2014–2015	Panegialios	26	(5)
2015	Apollon Smyrni	0	(0)
2016	Lamia	12	(2)
2016–2017	Veria	13	(1)
2017–2018	Trikala	5	(0)
2018–2019	AFC Eskilstuna	21	(1)
2021	Nacka Iliria	17	(5)
2022-2023	Edessa Syrianska KIF	20	(8)
- * Club domestic league appearances and goals as of 13 July 2019

Kristiјan Miljević (born 15 July 1992) is a Swedish-born Serbian footballer.

== Career ==
His father is from Serbia and his mother is Greek but Miljević grew up in Norrköping, Sweden where he started playing football. Miljević moved to PAOK youth academy at the age of 15. Lindö FF was his first club. Two years later he convinced manager Fernando Santos, now current manager in the Greece national team, that he should have a place in the team. He made his debut at the age of 17 against Aris. In August 2016 he moved to Super League side Veria. After a poor season, with 14 appearances and 1 goal he left the club. On 17 July 2017, he joined Trikala. On 29 July 2018, Miljević signed with AFC Eskilstuna in Superettan, Sweden's second tier.

On 9 April 2021, Miljević signed with Nacka Iliria.

== International career ==
Coach Tomislav Sivić called him to Serbia U19.

== Personal life ==
He is the younger brother of Michell Miljevic who currently plays for Edessa Syrianska KIF.
