= Georgios Bouzoukis =

Greek footballer (born 1993)

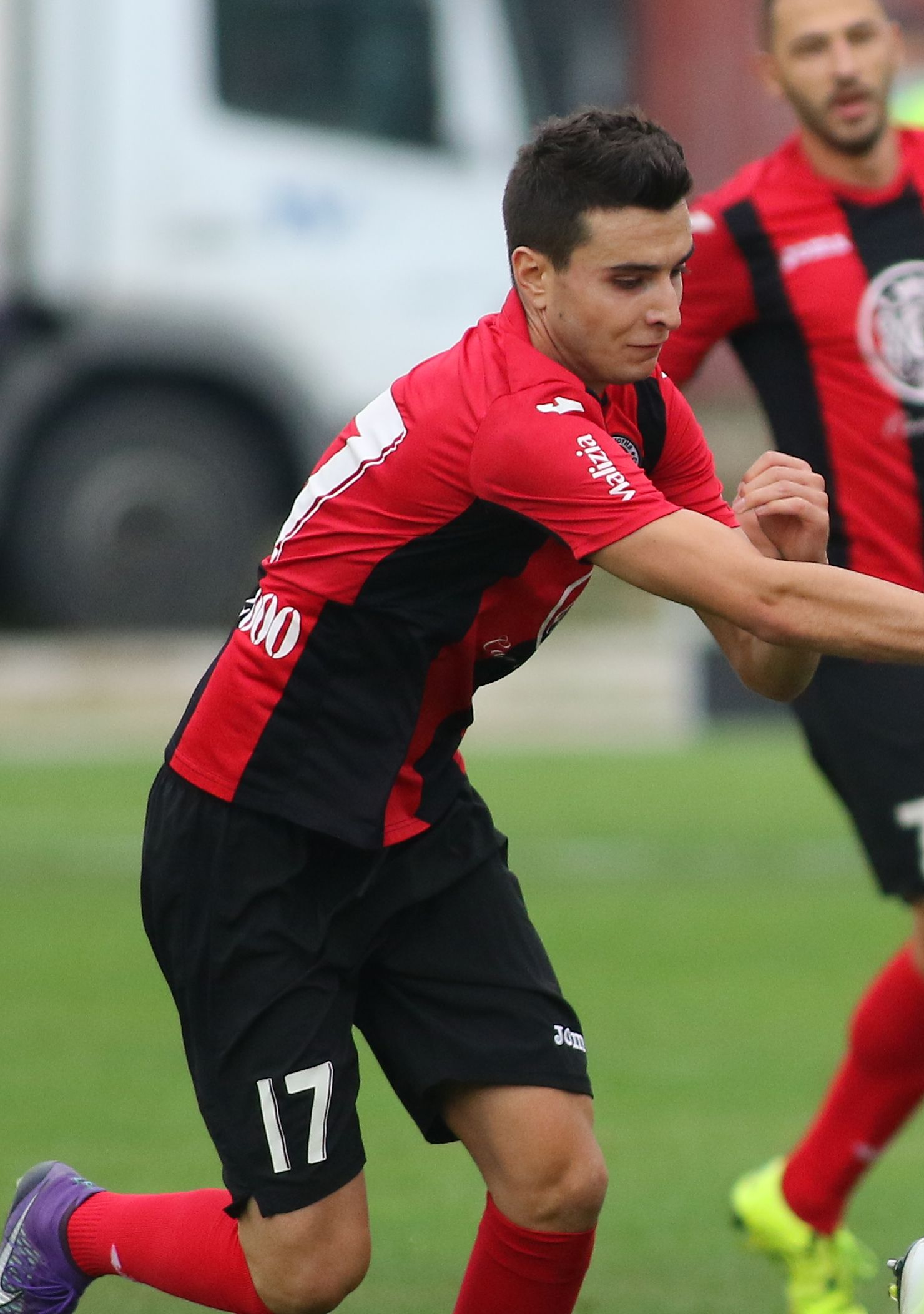

Personal information
- Full name: Georgios Bouzoukis
- Date of birth: 26 July 1993 (age 33)
- Place of birth: Katerini, Greece
- Height: 1.90 m (6 ft 3 in)
- Position: Midfielder

Youth career
- –2010: Vataniakos

Senior career*
Years	Team	Apps	(Gls)
2010–2012	Vataniakos	3	(0)
2012–2013	Aigianiakos	4	(0)
2013–2014	Vataniakos	21	(0)
2014–2015	Pierikos	22	(0)
2015–2016	Veria	0	(0)
2015–2016	→ Chania (loan)	9	(0)
2016–2017	Lokomotiv Sofia	21	(1)
2018	Sparti	8	(0)
2018–2019	Lokomotiv Sofia	14	(0)
2019–2021	Pierikos	0	(0)
- * Club domestic league appearances and goals as of 21 July 2021

Georgios Bouzoukis (Greek: Γεώργιος Μπουζούκης; born 26 July 1993) is a Greek professional footballer who plays as a midfielder for Bulgarian club Lokomotiv Sofia.

== Career ==
Bouzoukis started his professional career in Vataniakos as he debuted in 2013–14 championship of Football League on 21 February 2014 in a 0–0 home draw against Serres. On 30 June 2014 his contract with Vataniakos was expired and he signed a contract on 18 July 2014 with Pierikos. Bouzoukis was released on a free transfer on 30 June 2015 as his team was relegated to Football League 2. He was approached by Super League Greece side Veria and he eventually signed a three-year contract with the club. On 7 August 2015 and as the club had returned from their main stage of pre-season preparation in Arnhem, it was decided that Bouzoukis would move on a loan to Chania in order to gain more experience at professional level.
