= Pedro Arce (Paraguayan footballer) =

Paraguayan footballer (born 1991)

Personal information
- Full name: Pedro Marcelo Arce Meaurio
- Date of birth: 9 August 1991 (age 35)
- Place of birth: Asunción, Paraguay
- Height: 1.75 m (5 ft 9 in)
- Position: Midfielder

Team information
- Current team: Encarnación
- Number: 7

Senior career*
Years	Team	Apps	(Gls)
2011	Club Libertad	2	(0)
2012–2013	Club Rubio Ñu	5	(0)
2013	→ Club General Díaz (loan)	9	(1)
2013–2017	Sol de América	29	(1)
2017	→ Sportivo Trinidense (loan)	8	(3)
2018–2019	Atlante	20	(4)
2019	River Plate Asunción	2	(0)
2021–2024	Sportivo Trinidense	37	(3)
2024–	Encarnación	13	(1)
- * Club domestic league appearances and goals as of 4 April 2025

Pedro Marcelo Arce Meaurio (born 9 August 1991) is a Paraguayan footballer who plays as a midfielder for Encarnación.
