= Emiliano Romero (footballer, born 1985) =

Argentine footballer

Personal information
- Full name: Emiliano Daniel Romero
- Date of birth: 9 November 1985 (age 41)
- Place of birth: Sarandí, Argentina
- Height: 1.71 m (5 ft 7 in)
- Position: Midfielder

Youth career
- 1999–2004: Argentinos Juniors
- 2004: Independiente

Senior career*
Years	Team	Apps	(Gls)
2004–2005	Independiente	0	(0)
2005–2015	Defensa y Justicia	133	(24)
2009–2010	→ Platense (loan)	35	(9)
2011–2012	→ Olimpo (loan)	14	(0)
2013–2015	→ Everton (loan)	65	(17)
2015–2016	Panetolikos	3	(1)
2016	Oriente Petrolero	13	(1)
2017	Talleres RE	0	(0)
2018	Argentino de Quilmes	1	(0)
2018–2019	Dock Sud	–	(–)
Total		264	(52)
- * Club domestic league appearances and goals

Emiliano Daniel Romero (born 9 November 1985) is a former Argentine professional footballer who played as a midfielder.

== Club career ==
He played almost his entire professional career in Argentina. In June 2011, after almost miraculously saved from having to play a promotion relegation to the Primera B Metropolitana, with the 2–1 win over Rosario Central whereas Romero scored two goals, Defensa y Justicia are beginning to think about the next season of the Primera B Nacional. At that time, Emiliano Romero, who had a great tournament and even wore the captain's armband, is highly sought after by clubs in the Primera B Nacional, but especially from Argentine Primera División clubs. As a result, he signs to Olimpo in Primera División on loan from Defensa y Justicia.

In June 2013, he left from Argentina, signing to Everton of the Primera B de Chile in Chile, on loan from Defensa y Justicia. He made his debut with Everton in Sausalito Stadium, playing his first pre-season friendly game against Colo-Colo, losing 2–0. Besides his first game with the club Romero's media criticism was good. The newspaper La Estrella said: "Emiliano Romero in driving the ball, became a headache for the defense led by Omar Labruna."

The player who will fill the void left by Nicolás Martínez seems to found the Greek Super League Greece club Panetolikos, as Emiliano Romero, is expected in the next hours to Agrinio to complete his move. On 19 July 2015, Romero signed a two-year contract with Panetolikos for an undisclosed fee. On 12 January 2016, Panetolikos and Romero parted ways by mutual consent. On the same day, Liga de Fútbol Profesional Boliviano club Oriente Petrolero announced the signing of Romero. He returned to Argentine football to join Primera B Metropolitana side Talleres in January 2017.
