= Panagiotis Xoblios =

Greek footballer (1996–2021)

Personal information
- Date of birth: 27 February 1996
- Place of birth: Skydra, Greece
- Date of death: 20 April 2021 (aged 25)
- Place of death: Edessa, Greece
- Height: 1.90 m (6 ft 3 in)
- Position: Forward

Team information
- Current team: Kavala

Youth career
- –2012: Aetos Skydra
- 2012–13: AEK Athens
- 2013–14: Aris
- 2014–15: Niki Volos
- 2015: Veria

Senior career*
Years	Team	Apps	(Gls)
2015–2016	Veria	2	(0)
2016–2017	Panegialios	15	(1)
2017–2018	Kallithea	5	(0)
2018	Kavala		
- * Club domestic league appearances and goals

Panagiotis Xoblios (Greek: Παναγιώτης Ξόμπλιος; 27 February 1996 – 20 April 2021) was a Greek footballer who played as a forward for many clubs.

== Career ==
Xoblios started his football career at Aetos Skydra, his hometown's local football club. At the age of sixteen he was transferred to AEK and while he was part of the pre-season preparation at Romania, Vangelis Vlachos sent him to the under–17 squad where he was considered as a great talent by his coach Christos Kostis. After AEK's relegation, Xoblios moved to Aris where he played for the under–20 youth squad while he was signed to a professional contract. Since Aris' got relegated, he was released on a free transfer and he signed a new contract to Niki Volos where he stayed for six months, again at the under–20 youth squad, as the club quit the championship due to financial issues and was relegated. In January 2015, he was signed by Veria. At first, he joined Veria's under–20 youth squad. During the summer of 2015, he signed his second professional contract with Veria. On 17 January 2016, Xoblios made his professional debut in a 2–1 away defeat against PAOK.

Despite being a hot prospect for the club, Xoblios was released on a free transfer (as the club didn't seal a deal with Panegialios for loan before the deadline) on 31 August 2016. He also played with Almopos, Poseidonas Michanionas and Anagennisi Giannitson.

== Death ==
Xoblios died by heart attack on 20 April 2021.
