= Jonathan López (Spanish footballer) =

Spanish footballer

Jonathan
Personal information
- Full name: Jonathan López Pérez
- Date of birth: 16 April 1981 (age 45)
- Place of birth: Riañu, Spain
- Height: 1.85 m (6 ft 1 in)
- Position: Goalkeeper

Youth career
- Valencia

Senior career*
Years	Team	Apps	(Gls)
1998–2005	Valencia B	95	(0)
2001–2007	Valencia	0	(0)
2001–2002	→ Numancia (loan)	29	(0)
2002–2003	→ Oviedo (loan)	34	(0)
2005–2006	→ Córdoba (loan)	19	(0)
2007–2009	Albacete	48	(0)
2009–2010	Levadiakos	0	(0)
2010–2011	Roquetas	25	(0)
2012	Burgos	11	(0)
2012–2014	Veria	28	(0)
2014–2015	Getafe	4	(0)
2015–2017	Veria	37	(0)
2017–2018	Apollon Pontus	23	(0)
Total		353	(0)

International career
1996–1997	Spain U15	4	(0)
1997–1998	Spain U16	3	(0)
1998–1999	Spain U17	7	(0)
1999–2000	Spain U18	7	(0)
- * Club domestic league appearances and goals

Jonathan López Pérez (born 16 April 1981), known simply as Jonathan, is a Spanish former professional footballer who played as a goalkeeper.

== Club career ==
Born in Riañu, Langreo, Asturias, Jonathan was a product of Valencia CF's youth system; however, during his lengthy link with the club he could never appear officially with the first team, playing four seasons with the reserves in the lower leagues and also being loaned two times. He was first-choice for CD Numancia and Real Oviedo, being relegated from Segunda División with the latter side.

Jonathan terminated his contract with Valencia after a loan with Córdoba CF in the Segunda División B. He returned to the second tier afterwards, signing for Albacete Balompié and starting for the better part of his stint.

In 2009–10, Jonathan had his first taste of top-flight football, joining Levadiakos F.C. in Greece but being released at the end of the campaign without making a single competitive appearance. He then returned to the Spanish third division, successively representing CD Roquetas and Burgos CF.

Again as a free agent, Jonathan returned to Greece and its Super League in the summer of 2012, with Veria FC. He made his official debut on 15 September precisely against Levadiakos, being sent off in the last minutes of the match following a second bookable offence but contributing to a 0–0 away draw with a series of saves, including one from the penalty spot.

In July 2014, Jonathan moved back to his homeland and agreed to a one-year deal at Getafe CF. He made his La Liga debut the following 8 February at the age of 33 years and 10 months, in a 2–1 home win over Sevilla FC.

Jonathan left the club on 3 June 2015, after his contract expired. Subsequently, he rejoined Veria for two seasons.

== Career statistics ==
Appearances and goals by club, season and competition
Club	Season	League			Cup		Europe		Other		Total	
Club	Season	Division	Apps	Goals	Apps	Goals	Apps	Goals	Apps	Goals	Apps	Goals
Valencia B	1997–98	Segunda División B	16	0	—		—		—		16	0
Valencia B	1998–99	Segunda División B	32	0	—		—		—		32	0
Valencia B	1999–2000	Segunda División B	33	0	—		—		—		33	0
Valencia B	2003–04	Segunda División B	14	0	—		—		—		14	0
Valencia B	Total		95	0	—		—		—		95	0
Valencia	1999–2000	La Liga	0	0	0	0	0	0	—		0	0
Valencia	2004–05	La Liga	0	0	0	0	0	0	0	0	0	0
Valencia	Total		0	0	0	0	0	0	0	0	0	0
Numancia (loan)	2001–02	Segunda División	29	0	1	0	—		—		30	0
Oviedo (loan)	2002–03	Segunda División	34	0	1	0	—		—		35	0
Córdoba (loan)	2005–06	Segunda División B	19	0	—		—		—		19	0
Albacete	2007–08	Segunda División	26	0	1	0	—		—		27	0
Albacete	2008–09	Segunda División	22	0	0	0	—		—		22	0
Albacete	Total		48	0	1	0	—		—		49	0
Roquetas	2010–11	Segunda División B	25	0	—		—		—		25	0
Burgos	2011–12	Segunda División B	11	0	—		—		—		11	0
Veria	2012–13	Super League Greece	25	0	3	0	—		—		28	0
Veria	2013–14	Super League Greece	3	0	2	0	—		—		5	0
Veria	Total		28	0	5	0	—		—		33	0
Getafe	2014–15	La Liga	4	0	3	0	—		—		7	0
Veria	2015–16	Super League Greece	22	0	2	0	—		—		24	0
Veria	2016–17	Super League Greece	15	0	0	0	—		—		15	0
Veria	Total		37	0	2	0	—		—		39	0
Apollon Pontus	2017–18	Football League	23	0	0	0	—		—		23	0
Career total			353	0	13	0	0	0	0	0	366	0
