= King (footballer, born 1970) =

Brazilian footballer

Personal information
- Full name: Joaquim Devanir Ferreira do Carmo
- Date of birth: 1 July 1970 (age 56)
- Place of birth: São Paulo, Brazil
- Height: 1.88 m (6 ft 2 in)
- Position: Centre back

Senior career*
Years	Team	Apps	(Gls)
1992–1994	Braga	42	(2)
1994–1996	Farense	29	(2)
1995–1996	→ Benfica (loan)	0	(0)
1996	Châteauroux	5	(0)
1996–1998	Atlético Madrid B	20	(1)
1998–2000	Farense	39	(5)
2001–2002	Algeciras	18	(0)
2002–2006	Ionikos	88	(6)
2006–2007	Veria	28	(0)
2007–2008	Kavala		
2008–2009	Thermaikos		

Managerial career
- 2012–2013: Panathinaikos (assistant)
- 2013–2015: Veria (assistant)
- 2015–: Veria (interpreter)
- * Club domestic league appearances and goals

Joaquim Devanir Ferreira do Carmo (born 1 July 1970), known as King or Devanir King, is a Brazilian former footballer who played as a centre back.

== Career ==
Born in São Paulo, King joined S.C. Braga in the Portuguese first tier in 1992. He made his debut on 13 September 1992, in an away loss to S.C. Farense, adding 11 more league appearances in his first season. His second year was his breakthrough season, amassing 30 league caps, alongside either Jorge Ferreira or Sérgio Abreu.

In 1994, King moved to Farense, where he made nearly 30 league games in his first year, partnering with Jorge Soares in the defence of Paco Fortes team. Only a year after arriving in Faro, he made a surprise move to S.L. Benfica on a loan deal from Farense. He appeared in only one game, on 12 September 1995, in a 1–3 win against Lierse S.K. for the 1995–96 UEFA Cup.

After Benfica, he moved to LB Châteauroux, playing six months in the French second tier. In December 1996, the 26-year-old was signed by Atlético Madrid, being immediately assigned to their B-team, competing in the 1996–97 Segunda División. He debuted on 11 January 1997, in an away win against Real Madrid Castilla, for a total of 20 league appearances in his debut year. His second year in Madrid was not so successful, so he moved back to Farense in 1998, reuniting with Paco Fortes.

He resumed regular competition, playing 25 games in the starting eleven in his return year, but faced much more serious competition in his second, acting mainly a bench player.

Released by Farense, he spent one year without competing, practising at SJPF (Syndicate of Professional Football Players), with unemployed players. The 31-year-old later signed with Algeciras CF in 2001, playing 18 games in the third tier of Spanish football.

A year later, King moved to Greek football, joining Ionikos in the top tier, remaining there for four years, with nearly 100 league caps. He retired in 2009, after three seasons in the lower divisions, assuming an assistant position at Panathinaikos in 2012. He later quit his post and joined Veria staff, as assistant and translator for Ton Caanen, where he still remains.
