= Stelios Marangos =

Greek executive and retired association football player (born 1989)

Personal information
- Full name: Stylianos Marangos
- Date of birth: 4 May 1989 (age 37)
- Place of birth: Veria, Greece
- Height: 1.82 m (5 ft 11 1/2 in)
- Position: Centre-back

Team information
- Current team: Niki Volos (technical director)

Senior career*
Years	Team	Apps	(Gls)
2010–2011	Doxa Drama	16	(0)
2011–2012	Platanias	25	(1)
2012–2013	Kavala	34	(0)
2013–2014	AEK Larnaca	9	(0)
2014–2015	Kerkyra	28	(0)
2015–2016	Veria	36	(1)
2016–2017	Platanias	7	(0)
2017–2018	Aris	10	(0)
2018–2023	Veria	106	(3)
2023	Kozani	7	(0)
2023	Pierikos	0	(0)

Managerial career
- 2023–2025: Panserraikos (team manager)
- 2025–2026: Iraklis (team manager)
- 2026–: Niki Volos (technical director)
- * Club domestic league appearances and goals as of June 11, 2026

Stelios Marangos (Greek: Στέλιος Μαραγκός; born 4 May 1989) is a Greek retired professional association football player who played as a centre-back.

== Career ==
On 4 July 2013, Marangos signed a contract with AEK Larnaca in Cyprus for 1+1 years.

In early January Marangos agreed on a free transfer to Veria which would be activated on 1 July 2015. An action that bothered Kerkyra's manager and the administration board and led him to the exit. On 27 January 2015, Veria announced the signing of Marangos on a free transfer.

On 4 January 2017, Marangos signed a one-and-a-half-year contract with Platanias.

On 13 July 2017 he signed with Greek major club Aris Thessaloniki.

== Honours ==
=== Veria ===
- Gamma Ethniki: 2018–19
- Imathia Cup: 2018–19
