= Tagarochori Training Center =

- Interactive map of Tagarochori Training Center
- Location: Tagarochori; Veria
- Coordinates: 40°33′56.3″N 22°13′36.5″E
- Owner: Veria F.C.
- Type: Sports facility

Construction
- Opened: 1997 (renovated in 2014, 2015)
- Cost: N/A

Website
- Tagarochori Training Center

Tagarochori Training Center is a privately owned sports center built by Veria F.C. and is located in Tagarochori region, just outside the city of Veria. Its construction started in 1996 and it was completed in 1997. It was funded by Vasilis Tsiamitros, former president of the club.

Through the years, many improvements took place at the training center. The most recent was in October 2014, with a major upgrade to the two grass pitches which were completely replaced.

In May, 2015, after Zisis Vryzas' request, more upgrades took place in the area. There is a plan of expanding the facilities.

On 18 June 2015, Veria F.C. board announced the expansion and upgrade of the facilities. The construction was planned to finish in the end of the summer, and includes a new football pitch, based on Veria Stadium football pitch technical standards, in the main grass training pitch, as well as renovated locker rooms, renovated gym, sauna, whirlpool and recovery room, and utility rooms. The old drainage system of the grass pitches will be replaced by a new one that will provide better results. This is the biggest expansion to take place after its opening in 1997 and it cost €350,000.

== Facilities ==
- 2 grass pitches
- 2 grandstand buildings by both pitches 1 and 2
- 1 service building (including team catering areas)
- 1 gymnasium
- 1 first aid area
- 1 dressing room building
- 1 guest house building
- Recovery room
- Sauna
- Whirlpool
- Utility rooms
