= Nacka FC =

Swedish football club

- Full name: Nacka Football Club
- Founded: 14 May 2015
- Ground: Myrsjö IP; Nacka; Sweden
- Chairman: Salih Shala
- Head coach: Louay Chanko
- League: Division 2 Södra Svealand
Home colours	Away colours

Nacka FC is a Swedish football club located in the Stockholm suburb of Nacka. The club is a merger club consisting of Nacka FC, a youth club formed in 2015 and FC Iliria Stockholm, a team formed by the ethnic Albanian community in Stockholm the same year. The clubs merged in 2019, to the common name Nacka FC.

== Background ==
Since their foundation in 2015, Nacka FC has achieved a record-paced climb up the Swedish football league system. Together with FC Stockholm Internazionale they are the only club in the Swedish capital that has managed to climb from the lowest division (division 7) all the way up to division 2 within 7 seasons. The club is also the youngest club participating in the top tiers of Swedish football (Allsvenskan to division 3). They were also the youngest club ever to win the Stockholm Cup after beating Huddinge IF in the 2023 final.

In 2026 they will compete in the Division 2 Södra Svealand league. In March 2026 the club announced that they had signed a partnership deal with IF Brommapojkarna from where players will be loaned. They will also be supported by BP on several levels and also perform unified training sessions. Nacka-Värmdö Posten labeled Nacka FC as the new "feeder club for IF Brommapojkarna".

== Players ==
=== First-team squad ===
As of 6 February 2025

Note: Flags indicate national team as defined under FIFA eligibility rules; some limited exceptions apply. Players may hold more than one non-FIFA nationality.

No.	Pos.	Nation	Player
1	GK	SWE	Hugo Backman
2	DF	SWE	Joshua Adomako
3	DF	SWE	Adrian Andersson
4	DF	SWE	Alvin Svensson
5	MF	SWE	Justin Salmon
6	MF	SWE	Nhome Daneyl
7	FW	ALB	Leart Arapi
8	MF	SWE	Morris Carlsén
9	FW	BRA	Danilo Ireflod
10	MF	SWE	Eyasu Alemayehu
11	FW	SWE	Anas Maache
12	GK	SWE	Olle Eliasson

No.	Pos.	Nation	Player
16	DF	SWE	Sakarias Mahammad
17	DF	SWE	Elliot Grönberg
18	MF	SWE	Gustav Hammar
19	MF	SWE	Daniel Josefsson
20	FW	SWE	Fred Hedquist
21	DF	SWE	Saadoon Mohsin Al-Ghrairi
22	MF	SWE	Romario Navarro
26	FW	SWE	Philip Yarar

== Season to Season ==
Season	Division	Section	Position	Movements
2015	Division 7	Stockholm	3rd	
2016	Division 7	7 J	1st	Promoted
2017	Division 6	6 F	3rd	
2018	Division 6	6 F	2nd	Promoted
2019	Division 5	Södra	1st	Promoted
2020	Division 4	Södra	2nd	Promoted
2021	Division 3	Södra Svealand	4th	
2022	Division 3	Södra Svealand	1st	Promoted
2023	Division 2	Södra Svealand	8th	
2024	Division 2	Södra Svealand	10th	
2025	Division 2	Norra Svealand	6th	
2026	Division 2	Södra Svealand		
