= Iván Malón =

Spanish footballer

Personal information
- Full name: Iván Malón Aragonés
- Date of birth: 26 August 1986 (age 40)
- Place of birth: Gandia, Spain
- Height: 1.86 m (6 ft 1 in)
- Position: Right-back

Youth career
- Gandía

Senior career*
Years	Team	Apps	(Gls)
2005–2006	Gandía		
2006–2007	Oliva	34	(4)
2007–2008	Ontinyent	23	(0)
2008–2009	Murcia B	22	(0)
2008	Murcia	4	(1)
2009–2010	Pontevedra	40	(0)
2010–2011	Alavés	31	(1)
2011–2013	Numancia	45	(0)
2013–2014	Mirandés	25	(1)
2014–2017	Veria	62	(1)
2017	Cádiz	6	(0)
2017–2018	Recreativo	28	(1)
2018–2019	Ermis	17	(0)
2019–2020	Badalona	4	(0)
2020–2022	Gandía	36	(1)
Total		377	(10)
- * Club domestic league appearances and goals

Iván Malón Aragonés (born 26 August 1986 in Gandia, Valencian Community) is a Spanish former professional footballer who played as a right-back.
