= Thomas Nazlidis =

Greek former footballer

Personal information
- Date of birth: 23 October 1987 (age 39)
- Place of birth: Diavata, Greece
- Height: 1.85 m (6 ft 1 in)
- Position: Forward

Youth career
- 2001–2008: Ionikos Ionias

Senior career*
Years	Team	Apps	(Gls)
2008–2009	Ethnikos Sochos	12	(6)
2009–2010	Makedonikos	39	(7)
2010–2011	Kavala	11	(0)
2011–2015	Platanias	77	(21)
2015–2016	Veria	29	(5)
2016–2018	AEL	57	(14)
2018–2019	Aris	7	(0)
2019	Apollon Smyrnis	11	(0)
2019	Chania	5	(0)
2020	Triglia	10	(1)
2023	Magnisiakos Ionias		
- * Club domestic league appearances and goals as of 12 August 2020

Thomas Nazlidis (Greek: Θωμάς Ναζλίδης; born 20 October 1987) is a Greek former professional footballer who played as a forward.

== Career ==
Strong technically, skilful with a good shot and delivery from the inside, as well as from dead balls, Nazlidis played from 2011 to 2015 for Cretan side Platanias, but due to limit participation time, he decided to leave the club. On 20 January 2015, he was released on a free transfer. He scored twenty three goals in seventy seven matches in both Super League Greece & Football League. On 23 January 2015, he signed a contract with the Macedonian club Veria, returning close to his homeland, Thessaloniki where he comes from.

Nazlidis made his debut against Olympiacos on 1 February 2015, as he replaced Alexandros Vergonis. Nazlidis scored his first goal for Veria in a 1–1 home draw against PAS Giannina, on 23 August 2015, equalizing Noé Acosta's goal with a header. Nazlidis gave an assist to Djamel Abdoun to his first goal that he scored in an away match against Panthrakikos on 29 August 2015. On 25 October 2015, seconds before the final whistle blow, he scored the winning goal in a 1–0 away win against Panionios.

On 2 July 2016, Nazlidis signed a 3-years contract with Super League club AEL. He scored 9 goals in the season and was one of the club's key players especially in the first round.

On 28 August 2017, he scored his first goal for the 2017-18 season in a 1–1 home draw against Asteras Tripolis. On 28 October 2017 he scored in the 95th minute, giving his team an important home win against Levadiakos. On 21 December 2017 he scored a brace in a 3–0 home win against Xanthi for the first leg of the round of 16 of the Greek Cup. On 14 January 2018, he scored in a 3–1 away defeat against Asteras Tripolis. On 1 March 2018, he scored in a 2–1 home win against AEK Athens for the first leg of the semi-finals of the Greek Cup. On 15 April 2018, he scored in an emphatic 4–2 home win against Panetolikos. On 27 April 2018, it was announced that Nazlidis, along with two other teammates, would leave the team at the end of the season.

On 29 June 2018, Nazlidis joined Aris on a two-year deal. On 5 January 2019, he cut ties with the club.

On 5 January 2019, he signed a contract with Apollon Smyrnis another Super League club till the end of the 2018–19 season.

== Career statistics ==
=== Club ===
As of 5 January 2019

Club	Season	League			Cup		Continental		Other		Total	
Club	Season	Division	Apps	Goals	Apps	Goals	Apps	Goals	Apps	Goals	Apps	Goals
Kavala	2010–11	Super League Greece	11	0	0	0	—		—		11	0
Kavala	Total		11	0	0	0	—		—		11	0
Platanias	2011–12	Football League Greece	35	10	2	0	—		—		37	10
Platanias	2012–13	Super League Greece	22	4	5	1	—		—		27	5
Platanias	2013–14	Super League Greece	7	4	1	0	—		—		8	4
Platanias	2014–15	Super League Greece	20	3	2	1	—		—		22	4
Platanias	Total		77	21	10	2	—		—		87	23
Veria	2015–16	Super League Greece	29	5	4	0	—		—		33	5
Veria	Total		29	5	4	0	—		—		33	5
AEL	2016–17	Super League Greece	29	9	1	0	—		—		30	9
AEL	2017–18	Super League Greece	28	5	8	3	—		—		36	8
AEL	Total		57	14	9	3	—		—		66	17
Aris	2018–19	Super League Greece	7	0	2	0	—		—		9	0
Aris	Total		7	0	2	0	—		—		9	0
Career total			188	40	26	5	0	0	0	0	214	45
