= Vangelis Nastos =

Greek footballer

Personal information
- Full name: Evangelos Nastos
- Date of birth: 13 September 1980 (age 46)
- Place of birth: Thessaloniki, Greece
- Height: 1.80 m (5 ft 11 in)
- Positions: Defender; right back

Youth career
- PAOK

Senior career*
Years	Team	Apps	(Gls)
1996–2003	PAOK	50	(2)
1999–2000	→ AEL (loan)	24	(2)
2000–2001	→ Kalamata (loan)	26	(2)
2003–2005	Perugia	23	(0)
2005–2008	Vicenza	106	(3)
2008–2009	Ascoli	38	(1)
2009–2015	Atromitos	117	(6)
2015–2016	Veria	7	(0)
Total		391	(16)

International career
2001–2002	Greece U21	14	(1)
- * Club domestic league appearances and goals as of 20 December 2015

Vangelis Nastos (Greek: Βαγγέλης Νάστος; born 13 September 1980) is a Greek former football defender who last played for Veria in the Super League Greece.

== Career ==
Nastos is a youth product of PAOK FC and had contract with the club of Thessaloniki from 1996 to 2003. In the meantime he had played for AEL and Kalamata on loan. Nastos previously played for Perugia Calcio, Vicenza Calcio and Ascoli Calcio in Serie B. His contract with Atromitos wasn't renewed and so the player was released by the club on 30 June 2015. He played six consecutive seasons for the club and he made a total of 117 appearances scoring six times. On 6 August 2015, he signed to Veria for a year. Nastos made his professional debut on 23 August 2015 in a match against PAS Giannina. However, his career was relatively short-lived as he retired from professional football on 1 July 2016.

== Honours ==
Greek Cup

- Winner (1): 2003
- Runners-up (2): 2011, 2012
