= Dimitrios Kottaridis =

Greek footballer (born 1981)

Personal information
- Date of birth: 29 May 1981 (age 45)
- Place of birth: Kozani, Greece
- Height: 1.91 m (6 ft 3 in)
- Position: Goalkeeper

Team information
- Current team: Veria (First squad/U20 GK coach)

Youth career
- –1999: Akrites Kozanis

Senior career*
Years	Team	Apps	(Gls)
1999–2005	Kozani	19	(0)
2005–2014	Veria	97	(0)
2015	Irinoupoli F.C.	0	(0)

Managerial career
- 2013–15: Veria (Goalkeeper coach)
- 2015–: Veria (U20 Goalkeeper coach)
- 2016–: Veria (Goalkeeper coach)
- * Club domestic league appearances and goals as of 25 January 2016

Dimitrios Kottaridis (Greek: Δημήτριος Κοτταρίδης; born 29 May 1981) is a Greek former professional footballer who played as a goalkeeper.

== Playing career ==
Kottaridis started his professional career in Kozani F.C. where he stayed for six years. In 2005, Veria F.C. signed Dimitris Kottaridis on a free transfer. Kottaridis was part of Veria's squad for over eight years, having won promotion to Super League Greece two times. At the end of season 2013–14 he retired from professional football.

=== Honours ===
- Football League (Greece): 2
  - Runner-up: 2011–12, 3rd Place: 2006–07

== Coaching career ==
On 26 September 2013 Veria announced that Kottaridis would be their new goalkeeping coach after Jovan Mihailovic's departure. After Georgiadis' and his staff were fired from the club, Kottaridis returned to his post as Goalkeeper coach of the club.
