= Djamel Abdoun =

Algerian footballer (born 1986)

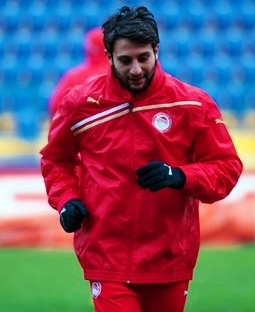
- Abdoun playing for Olympiacos

Personal information
- Date of birth: 14 February 1986 (age 40)
- Place of birth: Montreuil, Seine-Saint-Denis, France
- Height: 1.82 m (6 ft 0 in)
- Position: Winger

Youth career
- 2002: Paris Saint-Germain
- 2003: Ajaccio

Senior career*
Years	Team	Apps	(Gls)
2003–2008	Ajaccio	12	(2)
2007	→ Manchester City (loan)	0	(0)
2007–2008	→ Sedan (loan)	33	(5)
2008–2010	Nantes	50	(3)
2010–2011	Kavala	26	(3)
2011–2013	Olympiacos	50	(9)
2013–2015	Nottingham Forest	22	(1)
2015	→ Lokeren (loan)	4	(0)
2015–2016	Veria	15	(3)
Total		212	(26)

International career
2003–2004	France U18	4	(0)
2004–2005	France U19	13	(2)
2005–2006	France U20	8	(0)
2010–2016	Algeria	11	(0)
- * Club domestic league appearances and goals

Djamel Abdoun (Kabyle: Ǧamel Abdun; born 14 February 1986) is a former professional footballer who played as a winger. Born in France, he played for the Algeria national team.

In the summer of 2011, Abdoun signed a three-year contract with Olympiacos, on a free transfer from Kavala, due to their relegation to the fourth division. He has since won the double with Olympiacos, winning the 2011–12 Super League Greece and the 2012 Greek Cup. In the summer of 2013, Abdoun signed a three-year contract with Football League Championship club Nottingham Forest.

Abdoun is a former French youth international and was a part of the team that won the 2005 UEFA European Under-19 Football Championship, held in Northern Ireland and the 2007 Toulon Tournament. He opted to play for Algeria at senior level in September 2009, taking advantage of FIFA's new ruling, allowing him to change his national allegiance despite being older than 21 years of age. He made his debut for Algeria in a 0–0 group game at the 2010 Africa Cup of Nations on 18 January 2010, against Angola. He represented Algeria at the 2010 Africa Cup of Nations in Angola, where Algeria finished fourth, and the 2010 World Cup in South Africa.

== Personal life ==
Born in France to Algerian parents, Abdoun grew up in the eastern suburbs of Paris in the commune of Montreuil. His parents are originally from the villages of Tifrit and Biziou in the commune of Akbou, Béjaïa, in the Petite Kabylie region of Algeria.

== Club career ==
Abdoun started his career as a youth player for Paris Saint-Germain in 2002, where he was released at the end of the season. In 2003, he signed for Ajaccio where he made only 12 appearances in four seasons, scoring two goals.

Abdoun signed for Manchester City on loan in January 2007. He made only one appearance for the club, coming on as a substitute on 28 January 2007 in a 3–1 FA Cup win against Southampton. He returned to Ajaccio at the end of the season after Manchester City chose not to take up the option of making his move permanent.

=== Kavala ===
On 24 August 2010, Abdoun joined Greek side Kavala from Nantes, signing a three-year contract with the club. The details of the transfer were not disclosed. In his first season with Kavala, Abdoun finished as the top assist man in the Greek Super League with eight assists in 26 matches. He also scored three goals and was named as the second best player in the league behind Ariel Ibagaza of Olympiacos. On 23 May 2011, Abdoun's agent, Karim Aklil, announced that the player was very close to signing with Panathinaikos. However, on 25 August 2011, he began training with Olympiacos and passed the traditional medical visit.

=== Olympiacos ===
On 31 August 2011, Abdoun signed a three-year contract with Olympiacos, joining them on a free transfer from Kavala after they were relegated to the fourth division. He scored his first goal against PAOK and his second goal against Panathinaikos. He played 29 games and scored four times in total in his first season at Olympiacos.

Abdoun managed to score his first goal in the UEFA Champions League, in a 2–1 home loss against German side Schalke 04. He also scored from the penalty spot against Aris. His next two goals came again from the penalty spot; against AEK Athens away and Platanias at home. He scored his next goal against PAS Giannina in a 2–0 home win, which was assisted by Ariel Ibagaza. Days later, he scored against Atromitos from the penalty spot in a 3–2 home loss. On 27 February, Abdoun scored a goal from a free-kick in a 1–0 away victory over PAS Giannina in a Greek Cup match. His next goal came against AEK Athens in a 3–0 home win. His last goal for the season came against Platanias in a 4–0 away win.

=== Nottingham Forest ===
On 25 July 2013, Nottingham Forest chairman, Fawaz Al-Hasawi, announced the signing of Abdoun on a 3-year contract.

Djamel Abdoun scored his first goal in a home FA Cup Third Round tie against West Ham United. The goal came from a penalty awarded for a challenge on Jamie Paterson. Abdoun was insistent he was taking the penalty, even arguing with his fellow team-mates on the pitch, and his persistence paid off as he scored with an audacious chip from the spot. Forest went on to win the game 5–0.

On 10 July 2014, Abdoun was informed he was free to find a new club and that he "had no future at Forest". He never played for Forest again.

As Abdoun failed to find a team, he was loaned to Lokeren.

Abdoun's contract was mutually terminated on 30 July 2015.

=== Veria ===
On 20 July 2015, Abdoun was approached by the Super League side, Veria and her president, Theodoros Karipidis, in order to sign a contract for the club. Although, the player was positive playing for Veria, the offer made to him was turned down as it did not financially satisfy the player, he was offered about €250,000. A week later, Veria returned with a new improved offer. A day later, on 28 July 2015, Abdoun came in an oral agreement with the Macedonian club. Abdoun officially signed his contract on 8 August 2015.

Abdoun debuted on 23 August 2015 where he assisted Veria's equalizing goal on 1–1 home draw on season premiere against PAS Giannina with a free kick. On 29 August 2015, Abdoun scored his first goal for Veria in an away match against Panthrakikos after a Thomas Nazlidis' long ball. He scored with a penalty kick his second goal in the same game. He named man of the match. On 4 October 2015, he scored from the penalty spot, giving the victory by 1–0 in an away game against AEL Kalloni.

Abdoun was released on a free transfer from Veria on 31 August 2016.

== International career ==
Abdoun represented France internationally at the Under-17, Under-18 and Under-20 level. His most notable achievement was winning the 2007 Toulon Tournament with the French Under-18 squad.

However, being of Algerian descent, Abdoun holds dual nationality, and was also eligible to represent Algeria. On 15 September 2009, he was selected for the first time by head coach Rabah Saâdane to join the ranks of the Algeria national football team for a qualifier against Rwanda.

On 18 January 2010, Abdoun made his debut for the Algerian National Team coming on as a substitute in the 88th minute in a group game against Angola at the 2010 African Cup of Nations. He was named as part of the Algeria squad for the 2010 FIFA World Cup.

== Career statistics ==
As of 19 March 2016

Appearances and goals by club, season and competition
Club	Season	League			National cup		League cup		Other		Total	
Club	Season	Division	Apps	Goals	Apps	Goals	Apps	Goals	Apps	Goals	Apps	Goals
Ajaccio	2003–04	Ligue 1	1	0	0	0	0	0	–		1	0
Ajaccio	2004–05	Ligue 1	2	0	0	0	0	0	–		2	0
Ajaccio	2005–06	Ligue 1	7	2	2	0	0	0	–		9	2
Ajaccio	2006–07	Ligue 2	2	0	0	0	0	0	–		2	0
Ajaccio	Total		12	2	2	0	0	0	–		14	2
Manchester City (loan)	2006–07	Premier League	0	0	1	0	0	0	–		1	0
Sedan	2007–08	Ligue 2	33	5	5	2	1	0	–		39	7
Nantes	2008–09	Ligue 1	22	1	1	0	0	0	–		23	1
Nantes	2009–10	Ligue 2	27	2	0	0	1	0	–		28	2
Nantes	2010–11	Ligue 2	1	0	0	0	0	0	–		1	0
Nantes	Total		50	3	1	0	1	0	–		52	3
Kavala	2010–11	Super League Greece	26	3	2	0	–		–		28	3
Olympiacos	2011–12	Super League Greece	23	2	6	2	–		6 (Note: Four appearances in UEFA Champions League, two in UEFA Europa League)	0	35	4
Olympiacos	2012–13	Super League Greece	27	7	4	3	–		7 (Note: Six appearances and one goal in UEFA Champions League, one appearance in UEFA Europa League)	1	38	11
Olympiacos	Total		50	9	10	5	–		13	1	73	15
Nottingham Forest	2013–14	Championship	22	1	4	1	1	0	–		27	2
Nottingham Forest	2014–15	Championship	0	0	0	0	0	0	–		0	0
Nottingham Forest	Total		22	1	4	1	1	0	–		27	2
Lokeren (loan)	2014–15	Belgian Pro League	4	0	0	0	0	0	0	0	4	0
Veria	2015–16	Super League Greece	15	3	2	0	0	0	0	0	17	3
Career total			210	26	26	8	3	0	13	1	252	35

== Honours ==
Olympiacos

- Super League Greece: 2011–12, 2012–13
- Greek Cup: 2011–12, 2012–13

France

- UEFA European Under-19 Football Championship: 2005
- Toulon Tournament: 2007

Individual

- Super League Greece Player of the Season: 2012–13
- Super League Greece top assist provider: 2010–11, 2011–12, 2012–13
- Greek Cup top assist provider: 2011–12

== See also ==
- Maghrebian community of Paris
