= Pedro Arce (Mexican footballer) =

Mexican footballer (born 1991)

Personal information
- Full name: Pedro Arce Latapí
- Date of birth: 25 November 1991 (age 34)
- Place of birth: Saltillo, Coahuila, Mexico
- Height: 1.75 m (5 ft 9 in)
- Position: Attacking midfielder

Youth career
- Puebla
- 2010: Fundación Marcet

Senior career*
Years	Team	Apps	(Gls)
2011	Flota Świnoujście	0	(0)
2011–2012	FC Baulmes	11	(0)
2012–2017	Veria	47	(0)
2012–2013	→ Giannitsa (loan)	18	(5)
2013–2014	→ Kavala (loan)	22	(1)
2017–2019	América	5	(0)
2019–2020	Panionios	24	(2)
Total		127	(8)
- * Club domestic league appearances and goals

Pedro Arce Latapí (born 25 November 1991) is a Mexican former professional footballer who played as an attacking midfielder.

== Career ==
Born in Saltillo, Arce moved to Barcelona to play for Fundación Marcet at age 18. In early 2011, he signed for Polish second-tier club Flota Świnoujście. Due to paperwork issues, Flota was unable to register him to play, and he left the club in the summer without making an official appearance. Shortly after, Arce signed with Swiss semi-professional FC Baulmes where he appeared in 11 league matches. He then moved to Greek club Veria, and after loans to Giannitsa and Kavala he returned to the senior side.

Arce made his professional debut for Veria in a 2–0 home win against Niki Volos. He became the first player of his home city to play in a European championship. He made his second appearance in a 1–1 home draw against AEL Kalloni He made his third appearance against OFI in a 4–1 home win.

After making four appearances on his second spell at Veria, Arce was offered a one-year contract extension, an offer that he accepted. His contract was set to expire on 30 June 2016.

On 15 June 2017, Mexican side Club América announced they had signed Arce.

On 6 February 2019, he signed with Super League club Panionios On 2 November 2019, Arce's first goal for the team gave them a 66th-minute lead at home to Aris, despite having had a man sent off; the match ended 1–1. On 30 November 2019, he scored in an emphatic 3–0 home win against Panetolikos.

== Honours ==
América

- Liga MX: Apertura 2018
