= 2013–14 PAOK FC season =

PAOK
2013–14 season
- President: Zisis Vryzas
- Manager: Huub Stevens
- Stadium: Toumba Stadium
- Super League Greece: 2nd
- Greek Cup: Runners-up
- UEFA Champions League: Play-off Round
- UEFA Europa League: Round of 32
- Top goalscorer: League: Stefanos Athanasiadis (10 Goals); All: Stefanos Athanasiadis (17 Goals)
- Highest home attendance: 24,633 vs Panathinaikos (6 October 2013)
- Lowest home attendance: 5,268 vs Veria (26 January 2014)
- Average home league attendance: 13,397
Home colours	Away colours	Third colours

The 2013–14 PAOK FC season was the Club's 88th season in existence and the club's 55th consecutive season in the top flight of Greek association football. The team would enter the Greek Football Cup in the Third Round and would compete in the UEFA Champions League starting from the Third qualifying round.

On 14 June 2013, Huub Stevens signed a two-year contract to become PAOK's manager.

== Players ==
=== Current squad ===
No.	Name	Nationality	Position (s)	Date of birth (age)	Signed from	Notes
Goalkeepers
1	Jacobo Sanz Ovejero	(Spain)	GK	10 July 1983 (31)	(Greece) Asteras Tripolis	
50	Asterios Giakoumis	(Greece)	GK	3 May 1988 (26)	(Greece) Agrotikos Asteras	
71	Panagiotis Glykos	(Greece)	GK	3 June 1986 (28)	(Greece) Olympiacos Volos	
81	Michael Gspurning	(Austria)	GK	2 May 1981 (33)	(United States) Seattle Sounders FC	In in Winter TW
Defenders
2	Ioannis Skondras	(Greece)	RB / LB	21 February 1990 (24)	(Greece) Atromitos	
3	Georgios Tzavellas	(Greece)	LB	26 November 1987 (27)	(France) AS Monaco	
4	Giorgos Katsikas	(Greece)	CB	14 June 1990 (24)	(Greece) Iraklis	
15	Miguel Vítor	(Portugal)	CB / RB	30 June 1989 (25)	(Portugal) Benfica B	
16	Lino	(Brazil)	LB / LM	1 June 1977 (37)	(Portugal) Porto	
21	Nikos Spyropoulos	(Greece)	LB / LM	10 October 1983 (31)	(Italy) Chievo Verona	
29	Juan Insaurralde	(Argentina)	CB	3 October 1984 (30)	(Russia) Spartak Moscow	In in Winter TW
70	Stelios Kitsiou	(Greece)	RM / RB	28 September 1993 (21)	Youth system	
Midfielders
7	Georgios Georgiadis	(Greece)	RW / LW	14 November 1987 (27)	(Greece) Panserraikos	
8	Hedwiges Maduro	(Netherlands)	DM / CB	13 February 1985 (29)	(Spain) Sevilla	In in Winter TW
9	Zvonimir Vukić	(Serbia)	AM	19 July 1979 (35)	(Serbia) Partizan	
10	Lucas Pérez Martínez	(Spain)	AM / LW	10 September 1988 (26)	(Ukraine) Karpaty Lviv	
25	Costin Lazăr	(Romania)	CM / DM	24 April 1981 (33)	(Romania) Rapid București	
26	Ergys Kaçe	(Albania)	DM	8 July 1993 (21)	Youth system	
28	Kostas Katsouranis	(Greece)	DM / CB	21 June 1979 (35)	(Greece) Panathinaikos	
40	Maarten Martens	(Belgium)	AM / LW	2 July 1984 (30)	(Netherlands) AZ Alkmaar	In in Winter TW
66	Bibras Natcho	(Israel)	CM / AM / DM	18 February 1988 (26)	(Russia) Rubin Kazan	In in Winter TW
77	Sotiris Ninis	(Greece)	AM / RW	3 April 1990 (24)	(Italy) Parma	
96	Stelios Pozoglou	(Greece)	LW	22 January 1996 (18)	Youth system	
Forwards
11	Miroslav Stoch	(Slovakia)	LW	19 October 1989 (25)	(Turkey) Fenerbahçe	
14	Dimitris Salpigidis	(Greece)	CF / RW	18 August 1981 (33)	(Greece) Panathinaikos	
20	Danny Hoesen	(Netherlands)	CF	15 January 1991 (23)	(Netherlands) Ajax	In in Winter TW
33	Stefanos Athanasiadis	(Greece)	CF	24 December 1988 (26)	Youth system	
99	Sekou Oliseh	(Liberia)	RW / AM	5 June 1990 (24)	(Russia) CSKA Moscow	

Last updated: 3 February 2014
Source: Squad at PAOK FC official website

=== Transfers ===
==== In ====
No.	Pos.	Nat.	Name	Age	EU	Moving from	Type	Transfer window	Ends	Transfer fee	Source
2	RB	(Greece)	Ioannis Skondras	23		Atromitos	Transfer	Summer	2017	€0.3M	
13	CB	(Spain)	Íñigo López Montaña	30		Granada (Spain)	Transfer	Summer	2015	Free	
15	CB	(Portugal)	Miguel Vítor	24		Benfica B (Portugal)	Transfer	Summer	2016	Free	
21	LB	(Greece)	Nikos Spyropoulos	29		Chievo (Italy)	Transfer	Summer	2015	Free	
6	DM	(Greece)	Alexandros Tziolis	28		Monaco (France)	Transfer	Summer	2016	Free	
10	MF	(Spain)	Lucas Pérez Martínez	24		Karpaty Lviv (Ukraine)	Transfer	Summer	2016	€0.7M	
61	CF	(Czech Republic)	Tomáš Necid	23		CSKA Moscow (Russia)	Loan	Summer	2014	Free	
99	AM	(Liberia)	Sekou Oliseh	23		CSKA Moscow (Russia)	Loan	Summer	2014	Free	
11	LW	(Slovakia)	Miroslav Stoch	23		Fenerbahçe (Turkey)	Loan	Summer	2014	€1M	
77	AM	(Greece)	Sotiris Ninis	23		Parma (Italy)	Loan	Summer	2014	Free	
3	LB	(Greece)	Georgios Tzavellas	25		Monaco (France)	Transfer	Summer	2017	Free	
40	MF	(Belgium)	Maarten Martens	29		AZ (Netherlands)	Transfer	Winter	2016	€0.3M	
8	DM	(Netherlands)	Hedwiges Maduro	28		Sevilla (Spain)	Transfer	Winter	2016	Free	
81	GK	(Austria)	Michael Gspurning	32		Seattle Sounders FC (United States)	Transfer	Winter	2014	Free	
66	CM	(Israel)	Bibras Natcho	25		Rubin Kazan (Russia)	Transfer	Winter	2014	Free	
29	CB	(Argentina)	Juan Insaurralde	29		Spartak Moscow (Russia)	Loan	Winter	2014	Free	
20	CF	(Netherlands)	Danny Hoesen	23		Ajax	Loan	Winter	2014	Free	

==== Out ====
No.	Pos.	Nat.	Name	Age	EU	Moving to	Type	Transfer window	Transfer fee	Source
27	GK	(Cameroon)	Charles Itandje	30	EU	Konyaspor (Turkey)	Loan	Summer	Free	
2	RB	(Greece)	Alexandros Apostolopoulos	21	EU	Veria	Loan	Summer	Free	
3	LB	(Greece)	Kostas Stafylidis	19	EU	Bayer Leverkusen (Germany)	Loan return	Summer	Free	
8	DM	(Greece)	Kostas Panagiotoudis	19	EU	Panionios	Loan	Summer	Free	
11	LW	(Greece)	Dimitris Popovic	18	EU	Apollon Pontus	Loan	Winter	Free	
11	LW	(France)	Bertrand Robert	29	EU	Apollon Limassol (Cyprus)	End of contract	Summer	Free	
13	CB	(Croatia)	Gordon Schildenfeld	28	EU	Dynamo Moscow (Russia)	Loan return	Summer	Free	
18	AM	(Greece)	Georgios Fotakis	31	EU	Şanlıurfaspor (Turkey)	End of contract	Summer	Free	
30	CB	(South Africa)	Bongani Khumalo	26	EU	Tottenham Hotspur (England)	Loan return	Summer	Free	
39	CB	(Greece)	Christos Intzidis	20	EU	Levadiakos	Loan	Winter	Free	
77	RB	(Brazil)	Etto	32	EU	Baku (Azerbaijan)	End of contract	Summer	Free	
90	LW	(Guinea)	Abdoul Camara	22	EU	Sochaux (France)	Loan return	Summer	Free	
27	AM	(Greece)	Dimitris Pelkas	19	EU	Apollon Pontus	Loan	Summer	Free	
8	CF	(Greece)	Apostolos Giannou	23	EU	Panionios	End of contract	Summer	Free	
61	CF	(Czech Republic)	Tomáš Necid	23	EU	CSKA Moscow (Russia)	Loan return	Winter	Free	
5	DM	(Uruguay)	Pablo Gabriel García	36	EU	Skoda Xanthi	Contract termination	Winter	Free	
20	AM	(Republic of Ireland)	Liam Lawrence	32	EU	Barnsley (England)	Contract termination	Winter	Free	
13	CB	(Spain)	Íñigo López Montaña	31	EU	Celta de Vigo (Spain)	Loan	Winter	Free	
22	RB	(Greece)	Dimitris Konstantinidis	19	EU	Aiginiakos	Loan	Winter	Free	
6	DM	(Greece)	Alexandros Tziolis	28	EU	Kayserispor (Turkey)	Loan	Winter	Free	

Last updated: 1 February 2014

=== Managerial and Medical Staff ===
Technical staff "Technical Staff". Archived from the original on 2013-08-12.

Position	Name
Manager	(Netherlands) Huub Stevens
Assistant manager	(Greece) Georgios Georgiadis
Assistant Manager B	(Netherlands) Ton Lokhoff
Technical Director	
General manager	(Greece) Kostas Iosifidis
Scouter	(Greece) Kyriakos Alexandridis
Scouter	(Greece) Giorgos Kostikos
Scouter	(Greece) Kyriakos Tsitiridis
Fitness coach	(Netherlands) Chima Michail Onyeike
Fitness coach	(Greece) Grigoris Kavalieratos
Goalkeepers coach	(Greece) Dimitris Moysiaris
Clothing Manager	(Greece) Athanasios Sarapanis
Clothing Director	(Greece) Chrysovalantis Varlamis
Technical equipment Director	(Greece) Anestis Koutsouliotis
Driver	(Greece) Fotis Kyriakopoulos

Medical staff "Medical Staff".

Position	Name
Head of Medical staff	(Greece) Panagiotis Gigis
Club's Doctor	(Greece) Ioannis Rallis
Physiotherapist	(Greece) Nikos Tsirelas
Physiotherapist	(Greece) Stavros Terzanidis
Physiotherapist	(Greece) Athanassios Kapoulas
Physiotherapist	(Greece) Kostas Michailidis

U-20 Coaching Team "Medical Staff".

Position	Name
Head coach	(Serbia) Vladimir Ivić
Coach	(Greece) Stavros Sarafis
Director of Youth Departments	(Greece) Vangelis Pourliotopoulos

== Kit ==
Supplier: Nike
Sponsor(s): Pame Stoixima

Home	Home alt	Away	Third	Fourth

Source: PAOK FC official website

== Friendly matches ==
7 July 2013	Anzhi	0–0	PAOK	Bruck an der Mur
18:00				Referee: Τζούλιαν Βάινμπεργκερ

10 July 2013	Copenhagen	0–2	PAOK	St Veit am Vogau
19:30			71' Lawrence; 90' Salpingidis

13 July 2013	PAOK	0–1	Znojmo	Bruck an der Mur
17:30			71' Nepožitek

14 July 2013	PAOK	1–0	Pasching	Stainach/Styria
18:00	39' Salpingidis

17 July 2013	PAOK	1–0	APOEL	Bruck an der Mur
19:00	16' Salpingidis

23 July 2013	PAOK	6–0	Nice	Toumba Stadium
21:00	34' (o.g.) Puel; 54' Georgiadis; 74', 78', 81' Athanasiadis; 90' Katsikas			Attendance: 15000; Referee: Praxitelis Zaxariadis

25 July 2013	Apollon Kalamarias	1–2	PAOK	Kalamaria Stadium
19:00	89' Moisidis		20' Oliseh; 55' Lawrence	Attendance: 2500; Referee: Giannis Papadopoulos

2 August 2013	PAOK	2–0	Ethnikos Gazoros	Toumba Stadium
20:00	60' Deligiannidis; 72' Oliseh			Attendance: 5000; Referee: Nikos Tevekelis

10 August 2013	PAOK	1–3	AEL Kalloni	Toumba Stadium
20:00	57' Stoch		33', 36' Manousos; 47' Leozinho	Attendance: 7000; Referee: Athanasios Sezos

== Competitions ==
=== Overall ===
Competition	Started round	Current position / round	Final position / round	First match	Last match
Super League Greece	1	2nd (Alpha Order)	—	17 August	16 February 2014
Greek Football Cup	Second Round	runners-up	Final	26 September 2013	26 April 2014
Champions League	Third qualifying round	Play-off round	Play-off round	30 July	27 August
Europa League	Group Stage	Knockout Phase		19 September	13 December

Last updated: 20 February 2014

=== Overview ===
Competition	Record							
Competition	Pld	W	D	L	GF	GA	GD	Win %
Super League Greece	34	21	6	7	68	37	+31	61.76
Greek Cup	9	7	0	2	19	7	+12	77.78
UEFA Europa League	8	3	3	2	10	10	+0	37.50
UEFA play-offs	6	3	2	1	8	4	+4	50.00
UEFA Champions League	4	0	2	2	4	7	−3	0.00
Total	61	34	13	14	109	65	+44	55.74

Last updated: 9 June 2014.
Source: Competitions

=== Managerial statistics ===
Managerial record
Head coach	From	To	Record							
Head coach	From	To	G	W	D	L	GF	GA	GD	Win %
(Netherlands) Huub Stevens	Start Season	02.03.2014	45	26	9	10	84	45	+39	57.78

Managerial record
Head coach	From	To	Record							
Head coach	From	To	G	W	D	L	GF	GA	GD	Win %
(Greece) G. Georgiadis (Interim)	03.03.2014	17.05.2014	16	8	4	4	25	20	+5	50.00

== Super League ==
=== League table ===
Pos	Team	Pld	W	D	L	GF	GA	GD	Pts	Qualification or relegation
1	Olympiacos (C)	34	28	2	4	88	19	+69	86	Qualification for the Champions League group stage
2	PAOK	34	21	6	7	68	37	+31	69	Qualification for the Play-offs
3	Atromitos	34	19	9	6	54	25	+29	66 (Note: Head-to-head points: Atromitos 4, Panathinaikos 1.)	Qualification for the Play-offs
4	Panathinaikos	34	20	6	8	57	28	+29	66	Qualification for the Play-offs
5	Asteras Tripolis	34	16	10	8	46	35	+11	58	Qualification for the Play-offs

Source: Super League Greece
Rules for classification: 1) Points; 2) Head-to-head points; 3) Head-to-head goal difference; 4) Goals scored; 5) Goals against; 6) Play-offs (neutral ground).
(Note: Criteria 6 is only used if needed to decide champion, teams for relegation or teams for UEFA competitions).
If in final league table there are still tied teams after applying criteria 1 to 5, a decision match (or matches if they are more than two) are to be played but only in three cases: to determine the champion, to fill spots in the play-off or to determine the teams to be relegated. In any other case, the final standings of tied teams are determined with a public draw.
(C) Champions

=== Results ===
Overall								Home						Away					
Pld	W	D	L	GF	GA	GD	Pts	W	D	L	GF	GA	GD	W	D	L	GF	GA	GD
34	21	6	7	68	37	+31	69	16	1	0	41	8	+33	5	5	7	27	29	−2

Last updated: 20 February 2014.
Source: Competitive matches

==== Results by round ====
Round	1	2	3	4	5	6	7	8	9	10	11	12	13	14	15	16	17	18	19	20	21	22	23	24	25	26	27	28	29	30	31	32	33	34
Ground	H	A	H	A	H	A	H	H	A	H	A	H	A	H	A	A	H	A	H	A	H	A	H	A	A	H	A	H	A	H	A	H	H	A
Result	W	L	W	W	W	D	W	W	W	W	L	W	W	D	W	D	W	W	W	L	W	L	W	L	L	W	D	W	D	W	D	W	W	L
Position	1	6	2	2	2	2	2	2	2	2	2	2	2	2	2	2	2	2	2	2	2	2	2	2	2	2	2	2	2	2	2	2	2	2

Source: Competitive matches
A = Away; H = Home; W = Win; D = Draw; L = Loss

==== Matches ====
Win Draw Loss

17 August 2013 1	PAOK	3–0	Xanthi	Thessaloniki
21:30	Íñigo López (yellow card) 15'; Vítor 43'; Lino (yellow card) 45'; Lucas 67' (pen.); Stoch (yellow card) 69'; Athanasiadis 73' Manager: (Netherlands) Huub Stevens		(yellow card) 18' Mantalos; (yellow card) 37' Kyriakidis; (red card) 66' Baxevanidis; (yellow card) 71' Gohouri Manager: (Greece) Nikos Karageorgiou	Stadium: Toumba Stadium; Attendance: 17,139; Referee: Marios Lampropoulos

24 August 2013 2	Panetolikos	2–0	PAOK	Agrinio
19:15	Júnior (yellow card) 26'; Bojović 27' (yellow card) 42'; Melissas 45'; Camara (penalty missed) 87' Manager: (Greece) Makis Chavos	,	(yellow card) 41' Necid; (yellow card) 47' Vítor; (yellow card) 64' Tziolis; (yellow card) 64' Athanasiadis; (yellow card) 86' Kitsiou Manager: (Netherlands) Huub Stevens	Stadium: Panetolikos Stadium; Attendance: Behind closed doors (football); Referee: Mixail Voskakis

1 September 2013 3	PAOK	4–1	Panionios	Thessaloniki
19:15	Salpingidis 31'; Stoch (yellow card) 49' (goal) 54' 85' (pen.); Athanasiadis (yellow card) 51'; Kitsiou 76'; Kaçe (yellow card) 88'; Necid (yellow card) 90+1' Manager: (Netherlands) Huub Stevens	,	(yellow card) 32' Giannakopoulos; (yellow card) 44' Mitropoulos; (yellow card) 67' Pantidos; 81' (pen.) Aravidis; (yellow card) 83' Kurdi; (yellow card) 88' Kolovos; (yellow card) 88' Kampantais Manager: (Greece) N. Pantelis	Stadium: Toumba Stadium; Attendance: 15,257; Referee: Giannis Delfakis

14 September 2013 4	Veria	1–2	PAOK	Veria
18:15	Amarantidis (yellow card) 21'; Mrdaković (yellow card) 29' (goal) 83'; Georgiadis (yellow card) 54'; Anastasopoulos (yellow card) 67' Manager: (Netherlands) Ton Caanen	,	18' Vítor; (yellow card) 29' Jacobo; (yellow card) 42' Tziolis; (yellow card) 47' Katsouranis; (yellow card) 50' Lucas; 66' Stoch Manager: (Netherlands) Huub Stevens	Stadium: Veria Stadium; Attendance: 5,401; Referee: Alexandros Aretopoulos

22 September 2013 5	PAOK	1–0	Platanias	Thessaloniki
16:00	Vukić 58' (yellow card) 58'; Lazăr (yellow card) 72'; Vítor (yellow card) 90+1' Manager: (Netherlands) Huub Stevens	,	(yellow card) 63' David Torres; (yellow card) 72' Zoumpoulakis Manager: (Greece) Marinos Ouzounidis	Stadium: Toumba Stadium; Attendance: 14,716; Referee: Dimitris Styliaras

29 September 2013 6	OFI	1–1	PAOK	Heraklion
18:15	Perogamvrakis 15' Manager: (Greece) Pavlos Dermitzakis	,	74' (yellow card) 74' Necid; (yellow card) 10' Stoch; (yellow card) 37' Vukić; (yellow card) 59' Lino; (yellow card) 77' Tziolis Manager: (Netherlands) Huub Stevens	Stadium: Theodoros Vardinogiannis Stadium; Attendance: 5,193; Referee: Stavros Mantalos

6 October 2013 7	PAOK	2–1	Panathinaikos	Thessaloniki
20:30	Stoch 27' (pen.); Athanasiadis 48'; Tziolis (yellow card) 65'; Katsouranis (yellow card) 68'; Konstantinidis (yellow card) 78' Manager: (Netherlands) Huub Stevens	,	21' (yellow card) 38' (penalty missed) 81' Berg; (yellow card) 27' Risvanis; (yellow card) 87' Figueroa; (yellow card) 90+3' Ajagun Manager: (Greece) Yannis Anastasiou	Stadium: Toumba Stadium; Attendance: 24,633; Referee: Dimitris Thanos

19 October 2013 8	PAOK	2–0	Asteras Tripolis	Thessaloniki
18:15	Vítor 40' 57'; Athanasiadis (yellow card) 43' Manager: (Netherlands) Huub Stevens	,	(yellow card) 25' Kourbelis; (yellow card) 34' N'Daw; (yellow card) 48' Setti; (yellow card) 55' Pipinis Manager: (Greece) S. Vergetis	Stadium: Toumba Stadium; Attendance: 13,637; Referee: Kwnstantinos Iwannidis

27 October 2013 9	Panthrakikos	0–3	PAOK	Komotini
17:15	(yellow card) 54' Seremet; (yellow card) 59' Diogo Manager: (Greece) Apostolos Mantzios	,	11' 47' Lucas; (yellow card) 40' Athanasiadis; 72' (o.g.) M'Bow Manager: (Netherlands) Huub Stevens	Stadium: Komotini Municipal Stadium; Attendance: 4,437; Referee: Andreas Pappas

2 November 2013 10	PAOK	2–1	Ergotelis	Thessaloniki
17:15	Katsouranis 64'; Lino (yellow card) 65'; Vukić 90+4' Manager: (Netherlands) Huub Stevens	,	(yellow card) 10' Chanti; 13' Verpakovskis; (yellow card) 45' Kiliaras; (yellow card) 63' Cardozo; (yellow card) 67' Pelé; (yellow card) 88' (yellow-red card) 90+5' Mejía Manager: (Greece) Giannis Petrakis	Stadium: Toumba Stadium; Attendance: 12,996; Referee: Anastassios Kakos

10 November 2013 11	Olympiacos	4–0	PAOK	Piraeus
19:30	Mitroglou 35'; Saviola 60'; Fuster 74'; Campbell 80'; Samaris (yellow card) 87' Manager: (Spain) Míchel	,	(yellow card) 23' Lazăr; (yellow card) 68' Athanasiadis; (yellow card) 77' Ninis Manager: (Netherlands) Huub Stevens	Stadium: Karaiskakis Stadium; Attendance: 27,189; Referee: Andreas Pappas

24 November 2013 12	PAOK	3–1	Aris	Thessaloniki
19:30	Kitsiou (yellow card) 41'; Salpigidis (yellow card) 42'; Tzavellas (yellow card) 54'; Lucas 72'; Athanasiadis 80'; Vukić 90' Manager: (Netherlands) Huub Stevens	,	(yellow card) 18' (goal) 59' Udoji; (yellow card) 45+2' Damarlis; (yellow card) 54' Iraklis Manager: (Serbia) Zoran Milinković	Stadium: Toumba Stadium; Attendance: 19,440; Referee: Anastasios Sidiropoulos

2 December 2013 13	PAS Giannina	0–2	PAOK	Ioannina
19:30	Kolovetsios (yellow card) 18'; Korovesis (yellow card) 25'; Lila (yellow card) 47'; Berios (red card) 82' Manager: (Greece) Sakis Tsiolis	,	(yellow card) 23' Katsouranis; (yellow card) 37' Ninis; (yellow card) 54' Tzavellas; (yellow card) 70' Spyropoulos; 83' (pen.) Lucas; 87' Lazăr Manager: (Netherlands) Huub Stevens	Stadium: Zosimades Stadium; Attendance: 2,899; Referee: Ilias Spathas

8 December 2013 14	PAOK	0–0	Apollon Smyrnis	Thessaloniki
15:00	Lazăr (yellow card) 36'; Katsouranis (yellow card) 77'; Vítor (yellow card) 81' Manager: (Netherlands) Huub Stevens	,	(yellow card) 28' (yellow-red card) 40' Mingas; (yellow card) 84' Chatzizisis; (yellow card) 90+2' Tzorvas Manager: (Northern Ireland) Lawrie Sanchez	Stadium: Toumba Stadium; Attendance: 8,523; Referee: Georgios Kyzas

15 December 2013 15	AEL Kalloni	2–5	PAOK	Nea Smyrni
17:15	Perrone 6' (pen.); Chorianopoulos (yellow card) 31'; Gioukaris (yellow card) 86'; Manousos 87' Manager: (Greece) Giannis Matzourakis	,	(yellow card) 5' Glykos; 14' Oliseh; 29', 54' Salpingidis; 56' (o.g.) Anastasiadis; 59' Vukić Manager: (Netherlands) Huub Stevens	Stadium: Nea Smyrni Stadium; Attendance: 1,586; Referee: Michael Koukoulakis

18 December 2013 16	Atromitos	1–1	PAOK	Peristeri, Athens
17:15	Papadopoulos 26' (yellow card) 43'; Umbides (yellow card) 89'; Iglesias (yellow card) 90+2' Manager: (Greece) Georgios Paraschos	,	(yellow card) 43' (goal) 90' Tzavellas Manager: (Netherlands) Huub Stevens	Stadium: Peristeri Stadium; Attendance: 1,882; Referee: Anastassios Kakos

22 December 2013 17	PAOK	3–0	Levadiakos	Thessaloniki
15:00	Katsikas 10'; Kitsiou (yellow card) 54'; Stoch (yellow card) 62'; Tziolis 81'; Athanasiadis 83' Manager: (Netherlands) Huub Stevens	,	Manager: (Greece) Nikos Karageorgiou	Stadium: Toumba Stadium; Attendance: 9,020; Referee: Dimitris Thanos

5 January 2014 18	Xanthi	1–2	PAOK	Xanthi
19:30	Mantalos 13' de Guzman (yellow card) 36'; Baxevanidis (yellow card) 40'; Bertos (yellow card) 69' Manager: (Germany) Reiner Maurer	,	(yellow card) 37' Kitsiou; (yellow card) 69' Vukić; (yellow card) 69' Tzavellas; (yellow card) 72' Lazăr; 87' Katsouranis; 90+1' Lino Manager: (Netherlands) Huub Stevens	Stadium: Skoda Xanthi Arena; Attendance: 2,525; Referee: Thanasis Giaxos

12 January 2014 19	PAOK	1–0	Panetolikos	Thessaloniki
15:00	Maduro (yellow card) 49'; Lucas 53' Manager: (Netherlands) Huub Stevens	,	(yellow card) 36' Godoy; (yellow card) 56' Júnior Manager: (Greece) Makis Chavos	Stadium: Toumba Stadium; Attendance: 11,922; Referee: Iwannis Topouzis

18 January 2014 20	Panionios	2–0	PAOK	Nea Smyrni, Athens
19:30	Aravidis 6'; Lasnik 61'; Mitropoulos (yellow card) 44' Manager: (Greece) konstantinos panagopoulos	,	(yellow card) 41' Lazăr; (yellow card) 74' Athanasiadis Manager: (Netherlands) Huub Stevens	Stadium: Nea Smyrni Stadium; Attendance: 1,711; Referee: Stavros Mantalos

26 January 2014 21	PAOK	4–1	Veria	Thessaloniki
17:15	Oliseh 1'; Maduro 5' (yellow card) 22'; Salpingidis 13' 66'; Katsouranis (yellow card) 68' Manager: (Netherlands) Huub Stevens	,	(yellow card) 40' Bargan; 56' Gonçalves; (yellow card) 59' Amarantidis; (yellow card) 87' Ben Manager: (Serbia) Ratko Dostanić	Stadium: Toumba Stadium; Attendance: 5,268; Referee: Stavros Tritsonis

2 February 2014 22	Platanias	2–1	PAOK	Chania, Crete
19:30	Kaznaferis (yellow card) 34'; Katai 36'; Torres 67'; Tetteh (yellow card) 80' Manager: (Greece) Nikos Anastopoulos	,	(yellow card) 5' Kitsiou; 10' Athanasiadis; (yellow card) 51' Spyropoulos; (yellow card) 79' Kaçe Manager: (Netherlands) Huub Stevens	Stadium: Perivolia Municipal Stadium; Attendance: 1,846; Referee: Xaralampos Kalogeropoulos

5 February 2014 23	PAOK	5–0	OFI	Thessaloniki
19:30	Athanasiadis 4' (yellow card) 8'; Skondras (yellow card) 51'; Salpingidis 61'; Natcho 74'; Hoesen 80'; Maduro 86' Manager: (Netherlands) Huub Stevens	,	(yellow card) 33' Verón; (yellow card) 54' Milhazes Manager: (Portugal) Sá Pinto	Stadium: Toumba Stadium; Attendance: 8,214; Referee: Alexandros Aretopoulos

9 February 2014 24	Panathinaikos	2–1	PAOK	Athens
19:30	Triantafyllopoulos 47' (yellow card) 69'; Nano 56'; Koutroumpis (yellow card) 75' Manager: (Greece) Yannis Anastasiou	,	(yellow card) 26' Kaçe; (yellow card) 56' (goal) 92' Athanasiadis; (yellow card) 31' (yellow-red card) 55' Katsouranis; (yellow card) 62' Tzavellas; (yellow card) 90+3' Skondras Manager: (Netherlands) Huub Stevens	Stadium: Leoforos Alexandras Stadium; Attendance: 11,113; Referee: Dimitris Styliaras

16 February 2014 25	Asteras Tripolis	2–1	PAOK	Tripoli
15:00	Goian 65'; Juanma 78' (yellow card) 90+3'; Kyriakopoulos (yellow card) 68'; N'Daw (yellow card) 86' Manager: (Greece) S. Vergetis	,	60' Athanasiadis; (yellow card) 76' Natcho; (yellow card) 85' Insaurralde Manager: (Netherlands) Huub Stevens	Stadium: Theodoros Kolokotronis Stadium; Attendance: 2,351; Referee: Dimitris Thanos

23 February 2014 26	PAOK	3–0	Panthrakikos	Thessaloniki
19:30	Skondras (yellow card) 54'; Kace 62'; Vukic 85' 86' Manager: (Netherlands) Huub Stevens	,	(yellow card) 40' Katharios; (yellow card) 54' Ben Shabat Manager: (Greece) Apostolos Mantzios	Stadium: Toumba Stadium; Attendance: 7710; Referee: Michalis Koukoulakis

2 March 2014 27	Ergotelis	2–2	PAOK	Heraklion
17:15	Mejía (yellow card) 88'; Monachello 71'; Kitsiou 81' (o.g.) Manager: (Greece) Marinos Ouzounidis		2' (yellow card) 88' Lazăr; 47' Salpigidis Manager: (Netherlands) Huub Stevens	Stadium: Pankritio Stadium; Attendance: 1859; Referee: Athanasios Giachos

9 March 2014 28	PAOK	2–1	Olympiacos	Thessaloniki
19:30	Athanasiadis (yellow card) 23' (goal) 36'; Kaçe (yellow card) 48'; Tzavellas 84' (yellow card) 85'; Insaurralde (yellow card) 57'; Lucas (yellow card) 90' Manager: (Greece) Georgios Georgiadis	,	(yellow card) 23' Manolas; (yellow card) 27' Machado; 33' Samaris; (yellow card) 56' Salino; (yellow card) 90' Hernán Pérez Manager: (Spain) Míchel	Stadium: Toumba Stadium; Attendance: 23344; Referee: Kakos

16 March 2014 29	Aris	1–1	PAOK	Thessaloniki
19:30	Kaminiotis (yellow card) 13'; Tatos 23' (yellow card) 24'; Oikonomopoulos (yellow card) 45+6'; Aganzo (yellow card) 45+8' (yellow-red card) 88'; Vangjeli (yellow card) 72'; Aggeloudis (yellow card) 81' Manager: (Greece) Soulis Papadopoulos	,	45' (o.g.) Oikonomopoulos; (red card) 45+6' Kaçe; (yellow card) 45+6' Athanasiadis; (yellow card) 51' Natcho; (yellow card) 52' Tzavellas; (yellow card) 70' Glykos Manager: (Greece) Georgios Georgiadis	Stadium: Kleanthis Vikelidis Stadium; Attendance: 10,154; Referee: Georgios Kominis

23 March 2014 30	PAOK	2–1	PAS Giannina	Thessaloniki
15:00	Vukić (yellow card) 21'; Athanasiadis (yellow card) 26'; Kitsiou (yellow card) 30'; Tzavellas (yellow card) 30'; Vítor (red card) 32'; Stoch 66'; Lucas 82' (yellow card) 85' Manager: (Greece) Georgios Georgiadis	,	(yellow card) 32' Korovesis; (yellow card) 37' Dasios; 63' Lila; (yellow card) 64' Struna; (yellow card) 70' Vellidis; (yellow card) 75' Acosta Manager: (Greece) Giannis Petrakis	Stadium: Toumba Stadium; Attendance: 11494; Referee: Michael Voskakis

27 March 2014 31	Apollon Smyrnis	3–3	PAOK	Athens
19:30	Petropoulos 40' (pen.) 86'; Delizisis 45+1'; Kanakoudis (yellow card) 64'; Tsokanis (yellow card) 76' Manager: (Northern Ireland) Lawrie Sanchez		16' (pen.) 37' Lucas; 27' Katsikas; (yellow card) 40' Spyropoulos; (yellow card) 65' Insaurralde; (yellow card) 90+1' Georgiadis Manager: (Greece) Georgios Georgiadis	Stadium: Georgios Kamaras Stadium; Attendance: 1855; Referee: Dimitrios Styliaras

30 March 2014 32	PAOK	2–1	AEL Kalloni	Thessaloniki
15:00	Vukić 73'; Koulouris 84' (yellow card) 85'; Giakoumis (yellow card) 89' Manager: (Greece) Georgios Georgiadis		36' Perrone; (yellow card) 44' Chorianopoulos; (yellow card) 54' Fourlanos; (yellow card) 67' Keita Manager: (Greece) Giannis Matzourakis	Stadium: Toumba Stadium; Attendance: 8,458; Referee: Ioannis Topouzis

6 April 2014 33	PAOK	2–0	Atromitos	Thessaloniki
19:00	Salpigidis 5'; Vukić (yellow card) 54'; Vítor (yellow card) 78'; Natcho 84'; Lino (yellow card) 88'; Insaurralde (yellow card) 90'; Skondras (yellow card) 90'; Lazăr (yellow card) 90' Manager: (Greece) Georgios Georgiadis		(yellow card) 54' Fotakis Manager: (Greece) Georgios Paraschos	Stadium: Toumba Stadium; Attendance: 11355; Referee: Stavros Mandalos

13 April 2014 34	Levadiakos	3–2	PAOK	Livadeia
19:00	Varela 17'; Milosavljev 17'; Nikolakakis (yellow card) 19'; Koné 29'; Charalambous (yellow card) 50' Manager: (Greece) Savvas Pantelidis		47' Oliseh; (yellow card) 59' Kristi Qose; (yellow card) 88' Kitsiou; 90+1' Vukić Manager: (Greece) Georgios Georgiadis	Stadium: Levadia Municipal Stadium; Attendance: 1554; Referee: Ioannis Delfakis

=== Play-offs ===
==== Table ====
Pos	Team	Pld	W	D	L	GF	GA	GD	Pts	Qualification
2	Panathinaikos	6	2	3	1	7	5	+2	11	Qualification for the Champions League third qualifying round (Note: Panathinaikos won the 2013–14 Greek Football Cup against PAOK, so all of the Europa League berths are reverted into play-off positions.)
3	PAOK	6	3	2	1	8	4	+4	10	Qualification for the Europa League play-off round
4	Atromitos	6	1	2	3	6	9	−3	7 (Note: Head-to-head record: Asteras Tripolis–Atromitos 1–0, Atromitos–Asteras Tripolis 3–1.)	Qualification for the Europa League third qualifying round
5	Asteras Tripolis	6	2	1	3	5	8	−3	7	Qualification for the Europa League second qualifying round

Source: Super League Greece: Standings and Schedule
Rules for classification: 1) points; 2) head-to-head points; 3) head-to-head goal difference; 4) away goals rule; 5) classification of regular season

==== Matches ====
23 May 2014 1	PAOK	1–1	Asteras Tripolis	Thessaloniki
19:15 EET	Athanasiadis (yellow card) 12'; Stoch 59'; Tzavellas (yellow card) 82'; Skondras (yellow card) 90+1'; Vítor (yellow card) 90+2' Manager: (Greece) Georgios Georgiadis		12' (yellow card) 44' Barrales; (yellow card) 70' Sankaré; (yellow card) 80' Kourbelis; (yellow card) 84' Goian; (yellow card) 90' de Blasis Manager: (Greece) S. Vergetis	Stadium: Toumba Stadium; Attendance: 6388; Referee: Giorgos Daskalopoulos

4 May 2014 2	Panathinaikos	1–1	PAOK	Athens
20:30 EET	Petrić 20'; Pranjić (yellow card) 78' Manager: (Greece) Yannis Anastasiou		84' Salpigidis; (yellow card) 90' Stoch Manager: (Greece) Georgios Georgiadis	Stadium: Leoforos Alexandras Stadium; Attendance: 11713; Referee: Andreas Pappas

7 May 2014 3	PAOK	3–0	Atromitos	Thessaloniki
18:15 EET	Natcho 40' (pen.); Stoch 44'; Kaçe (yellow card) 64'; Vukić 86' Manager: (Greece) Georgios Georgiadis		(yellow card) 42' Lazaridis Manager: (Greece) Georgios Paraschos	Stadium: Toumba Stadium; Referee: Michael Koukoulakis

11 May 2014 4	Atromitos	1–2	PAOK	Peristeri, Athens
20:30 EET	Papadopoulos (yellow card) 35' (penalty missed) 90+2'; Tavlaridis 37'; M. Garcia (yellow card) 59'; K. Giannoulis (yellow card) 85' Manager: (Greece) Georgios Paraschos		(yellow card) 12' (yellow-red card) 89' Tzavellas; (yellow card) 27' Lazăr; (yellow card) 69' Skondras; 74' Salpigidis; 78' Athanasiadis Manager: (Greece) Georgios Georgiadis	Stadium: Peristeri Stadium; Attendance: 2315; Referee: Dimitrios Styliaras

14 May 2014 5	Asteras Tripolis	1–0	PAOK	Tripoli
17:00 EET	Carrasco 44'; Juanma (yellow card) 77'; Hernández (yellow card) 90+4' Manager: (Greece) S. Vergetis		(yellow card) 77' Athanasiadis Manager: (Greece) Georgios Georgiadis	Stadium: Theodoros Kolokotronis Stadium; Attendance: 1845; Referee: Andreas Pappas

17 May 2014 6	PAOK	1–0	Panathinaikos	Thessaloniki
20:30 EET	Vukić 57'; Natcho (yellow card) 76' Manager: (Greece) Georgios Georgiadis		Manager: (Greece) Yannis Anastasiou	Stadium: Toumba Stadium; Referee: Aristomenis Koutsiaftis

== Greek Football Cup ==
=== Second round ===
26 September 2013 1st leg	PAOK	3–0	Anagennisi Karditsa	Thessaloniki
20:30	Georgiadis 45+1'; Vukić 75'; Necid 83'; Konstantinidis (yellow card) 90+2' Manager: (Netherlands) Huub Stevens	,	(yellow card) 26' Karahalios; (yellow card) 26' Rovas Manager: (Greece) Theodosis Theodosiadis	Stadium: Toumba Stadium; Attendance: 9,452; Referee: Iwannis Topouzis

30 October 2013 2nd leg	Anagennisi Karditsa	0–1 (0–4 agg.)	PAOK	Karditsa
20:30	Bousinakis (yellow card) 56' Manager: (Greece) Theodosis Theodosiadis	,	67' Oliseh Manager: (Netherlands) Huub Stevens	Stadium: Karditsa Stadium; Attendance: TBD; Referee: Alexandros Katsikogiannis

=== Third round ===
9 January 2014 1st leg	Iraklis	0–1	PAOK	Thessaloniki
20:00	Taianan (yellow card) 25'; Kontodimos (yellow card) 39'; N. Savidis (yellow card) 86' (yellow-red card) 90+1' Manager: (Argentina) G. Hoyos	,	58' (yellow card) 65' Athanasiadis; (yellow card) 78' Kaçe Manager: (Netherlands) Huub Stevens	Stadium: Kaftanzoglio Stadium; Attendance: TBD; Referee: Aristomenis Koutsiaftis

22 January 2014 2nd leg	PAOK	5–1 (6–1 agg.)	Iraklis	Thessaloniki
17:00	Kitsiou (yellow card) 18'; Athanasiadis 20' (yellow card) 21'; Stoch 22' (yellow card) 26' (goal) 55'; Kaçe (yellow card) 72'; Tzavellas (yellow card) 73' (yellow-red card) 86'; Oliseh 82'; Martens 90+3' Manager: (Netherlands) Huub Stevens	,	4' Pourtoulidis; (yellow card) 25' Intzoglou; (yellow card) 42' Papasterianos; (yellow card) 76' Chionidis; (yellow card) 78' Zahora Manager: (Argentina) G. Hoyos	Stadium: Toumba Stadium; Attendance: 9,788; Referee: Apostolos Amparkiolis

=== Quarter-finals ===
30 January 2014 1st leg	PAOK	3–0	Apollon Smyrnis	Thessaloniki
20:00	Glykos (yellow card) 10'; Vukić (yellow card) 10' (goal) 27' 35'; Maduro 76' Manager: (Netherlands) Huub Stevens	,	(yellow card) 34' Dimitrios Diamantis Manager: (Northern Ireland) Lawrie Sanchez	Stadium: Toumba Stadium; Attendance: 8,559; Referee: Giorgos Daskalopoulos

13 February 2014 2nd leg	Apollon Smyrnis	0–3 (0–6 agg.)	PAOK	Athens
20:00	Manager: (Northern Ireland) Lawrie Sanchez	,	(yellow card) 31' Kaçe; (yellow card) 38' Spyropoulos; 42' Athanasiadis; 54' 90' Koulouris Manager: (Netherlands) Huub Stevens	Stadium: Georgios Kamaras Stadium; Referee: Gerasimos Ntitsios

=== Semi-finals ===
2 April 2014 1st leg	Olympiacos	2–1	PAOK	Piraeus
19:00	Domínguez 8'; Fuster 11' (yellow card) 33'; Valdez (yellow card) 21'; Samaris (yellow card) 72' Manager: (Spain) Míchel		(yellow card) 12' (goal) 31' Athanasiadis; (yellow card) 34' Natcho; (red card) 34' Stoch; (yellow card) 76' Tzavellas Manager: (Greece) Georgios Georgiadis	Stadium: Karaiskakis Stadium; Referee: Haralmbos Kalogeropoulos

16 April 2014 2nd leg	PAOK	1–0 (2a–2 agg.)	Olympiacos	Thessaloniki
20:00	Athanasiadis 47' (yellow card) 90+3'; Katsouranis (yellow card) 52' (yellow-red card) 89'; Tzavellas (yellow card) 53'; Vítor (yellow card) 54'; Skondras (yellow card) 58'; Natcho (red card) 90+6'; Glykos (yellow card) 90+12' Manager: (Greece) Georgios Georgiadis		(yellow card) 6' Campbell; (yellow card) 53' Domínguez; (yellow card) 64' Valdez; (yellow card) 75' Manolas; (red card) 89' Maniatis; (yellow card) 90+6' Megyeri Manager: (Spain) Míchel	Stadium: Toumba Stadium; Attendance: 28,703; Referee: Stavros Mandalos

=== Final ===
26 April 2014	Panathinaikos	4–1	PAOK	Athens
20:00	Berg 15' 50' 88' (yellow card) 88'; Koutroumpis (yellow card) 20'; Karelis 54' (yellow card) 54'; Zeca (yellow card) 60' Manager: (Greece) Yannis Anastasiou	,	(yellow card) 18' Kaçe; 70' (pen.) Vukić Manager: (Greece) Georgios Georgiadis	Stadium: Olympic Stadium; Attendance: 44,356; Referee: Tassos Kakos (Corfu)

== UEFA Champions League ==
=== Third qualifying round ===
30 July 2013 1st leg	PAOK (Greece)	0–2	(Ukraine) Metalist Kharkiv	Thessaloniki, Greece
20:00 CET		Report	42' (pen.) 72' Dević	Stadium: Toumba Stadium, Toumpa; Attendance: 200 Behind closed doors (football); Referee: Pol van Boekel (NED)

7 August 2013 2nd leg	Metalist Kharkiv (Ukraine)	1–1 (3–1 agg.)	(Greece) PAOK	Kharkiv, Ukraine
19:00	72' Blanco	Report	83' Necid	Stadium: Metalist Oblast Sports Complex, Kharkiv; Attendance: 39,286; Referee: Florian Meyer (Germany)

UEFA decided to replace Metalist Kharkiv with PAOK after they were disqualified from UEFA competitions for match fixing.

=== Play-off Round ===
21 August 2013 1st leg	Schalke 04 (Germany)	1–1	(Greece) PAOK	Gelsenkirchen, Germany
20:45CET	32' Farfán	Report	73' Stoch	Stadium: Veltins-Arena, Gelsenkirchen; Attendance: 52,444; Referee: Stéphane Lannoy (France)

27 August 2013 2nd leg	PAOK (Greece)	2–3 (3–4 agg.)	(Germany) Schalke 04	Thessaloniki, Greece
20:45CET	53' Athanasiadis; 79' Katsouranis	Report	43' 90' Szalai; 67' Draxler	Stadium: Toumba Stadium, Toumpa; Attendance: 350 Behind closed doors (football); Referee: Björn Kuipers (Netherlands)

== UEFA Europa League ==
=== Group stage ===
Pos	Team	Pld	W	D	L	GF	GA	GD	Pts	Qualification	AZ	PAO	MHA	SHA
1	(Netherlands) AZ	6	3	3	0	8	4	+4	12 (Note: Tied on head-to-head points (2) and head-to-head goal difference (0). Head-to-head away goals: AZ 2, PAOK 1.)	Advance to knockout phase	—	1–1	2–0	1–0
2	(Greece) PAOK	6	3	3	0	10	6	+4	12	Advance to knockout phase	2–2	—	3–2	2–1
3	(Israel) Maccabi Haifa	6	1	2	3	6	9	−3	5		0–1	0–0	—	2–1
4	(Kazakhstan) Shakhter Karagandy	6	0	2	4	5	10	−5	2		1–1	0–2	2–2	—

Source: Soccerway
Notes:

19 September 2013 1	PAOK (Greece)	2–1	(Kazakhstan) Shakhter Karagandy	Thessaloniki, Greece
21:05 CET	75' Athanasiadis; 90+2' Vukić	Report	50' (pen.) Cañas	Stadium: Toumba Stadium; Attendance: 255 Behind closed doors (football); Referee: Fredy Fautrel (France)

3 October 2013 2	AZ (Netherlands)	1–1	(Greece) PAOK	Alkmaar, Netherlands
19:00 CET	82' Gouweleeuw	Report	90+3' Salpingidis	Stadium: AFAS Stadion; Attendance: 10,761; Referee: Luca Banti (Italy)

24 October 2013 3	PAOK (Greece)	3–2	(Israel) Maccabi Haifa	Thessaloniki, Greece
19:00 CET	35' Vítor; 39' Ninis; 67' Salpingidis	Report	13' Ndlovu; 21' Golasa	Stadium: Toumba Stadium; Attendance: 14,211; Referee: Fernando Teixeira Vitienes (Spain)

7 November 2013 4	Maccabi Haifa (Israel)	0–0	(Greece) PAOK	Haifa, Israel
21:05 CET		Report		Stadium: Kiryat Eliezer; Attendance: 10,000; Referee: Felix Zwayer (Germany)

28 November 2013 5	Shakhter Karagandy (Kazakhstan)	0–2	(Greece) PAOK	Astana, Kazakhstan
16:00 CET		Report	54' (o.g.) Đidić; 90+2' Kitsiou	Stadium: Astana Arena; Attendance: 7,556; Referee: Serge Gumienny (Belgium)

12 December 2013 6	PAOK (Greece)	2–2	(Netherlands) AZ	Thessaloniki, Greece
21:05 CET	37' (pen.) Lucas; 90+4' Pozoglou	Report	30' Lam; 71' (pen.) Gorter	Stadium: Toumba Stadium; Attendance: 11,211; Referee: Michael Oliver (England)

AZ and PAOK qualified to the Knockout Phase (round 32)

=== Knockout phase ===
==== Round of 32 ====
20 February 2014 1st leg	PAOK (Greece)	0–1	(Portugal) Benfica	Thessaloniki, Greece
20:00			Lima 59'	Stadium: Toumba Stadium, Toumba; Attendance: 24,670; Referee: Wolfgang Stark

27 February 2014 2nd leg	Benfica (Portugal)	3–0 (4–0 agg.)	(Greece) PAOK	Lisbon, Portugal
22:05	Gaitán 70'; Lima 78' (pen.); Marković 79'	Report		Stadium: Estádio da Luz, Lisbon; Attendance: 31,058; Referee: Szymon Marciniak (Poland)

== Statistics ==
=== Squad statistics ===
				Total				Super League Greece		Greek Football Cup		Super League Greece UEFA play-offs		UEFA Champions League		UEFA Europa League		
N	Pos.	Name	Nat.	GS	App	Gls	Min	App	Gls	App	Gls	App	Gls	App	Gls	App	Gls	Notes
1	GK	Jacobo	(Spain)		19			11						4		4		
2	DF	Giannis Skondras	(Greece)		30			17		6		5				2		
3	DF	Georgios Tzavellas	(Greece)		37	2		19	2	8		5				5		
4	DF	Giorgos Katsikas	(Greece)		12	2		8	2	2		1				1		
5	MF	P. García	(Uruguay)		2					2								
6	MF	Alexandros Tziolis	(Greece)		30	1		19	1	1				4		6		
7	MF	G. Georgiadis	(Greece)		15	1		10		3	1			2				
8	MF	Hedwiges Maduro	(Netherlands)		15	3		9	2	4	1					2		
9	MF	Zvonimir Vukić	(Serbia)		37	15		24	8	5	4	4	2	1		3	1	
10	MF	Lucas	(Spain)		50	10		31	9	6		1		4		8	1	
11	FW	Miroslav Stoch	(Slovakia)		45	11		24	5	6	2	5	2	2	2	8		
13	DF	I. López	(Spain)		5			3		2								
14	FW	D. Salpigidis	(Greece)		49	12		30	8	4		5	2	4		6	2	
15	DF	Miguel Vítor	(Portugal)		36	5		20	4	4		4		4		4	1	
16	DF	Lino	(Brazil)		42	1		20	1	6		6		4		6		
18	FW	Koulouris	(Greece)		11	3		4	1	2	2	5						
20	FW	Danny Hoesen	(Netherlands)		11	1		10	1	1								
21	DF	Spyropoulos	(Greece)		15			11		2		2						
22	DF	Konstantinidis	(Greece)		5			2		2						1		
25	MF	Costin Lazăr	(Romania)		43	2		23	2	3		5		4		8		
26	MF	Ergys Kaçe	(Albania)		30	1		13	1	7		6		2		2		
28	MF	Katsouranis	(Greece)		46	2		26	2	5		3		4		8		
29	DF	Insaurralde	(Argentina)		17			8		4		3				2		
33	FW	Stefanos Athanasiadis	(Greece)		47	17		24	9	6	5	5	1	4	1	8	1	
40	MF	Maarten Martens	(Belgium)		9	1		5		2	1	2						
50	GK	Giakoumis	(Greece)		1			1										
61	FW	Tomáš Necid	(Czech Republic)		17	3		11	1	2	1			2	1	2		
66	MF	Bibras Natcho	(Israel)		20	3		11	2	3		6	1					
70	DF	Stelios Kitsiou	(Greece)		46	2		27	1	5		3		4		7	1	
71	GK	Panagiotis Glykos	(Greece)		40			21		9		6				4		
77	MF	Sotiris Ninis	(Greece)		23	1		12		4						7	1	
96	MF	Stelios Pozoglou	(Greece)		6	1		3		1		1				1	1	
99	FW	Sekou Oliseh	(Liberia)		26	5		12	3	5	2			4		5		
	MF	Liam Lawrence	(Republic of Ireland)		9			2		2				3		2		
	MF	Theofanis Tzandaris	(Greece)		2					2								
81	GK	M. Gspurning	(Austria)		1			1										
	MF	Kyriakos Savvidis	(Greece)		1			1										
	DF	Kristi Qose	(Albania)		1			1										

Last updated: June 2014
Source: Match reports in competitive matches, superleaguegreece.net,uefa.com, soccerway.com
Ordered by squad number
0 shown as blank

=== Goalscorers ===
All goals

Rank	No.	Pos.	Player	League	Cup	Playoffs	Champ. League	Europa League	Total
1	33	FW	(Greece) Athanasiadis	9	5	1	1	1	17
2	9	MF	(Serbia) Vukić	8	4	2	0	1	15
3	14	FW	(Greece) Dimitris Salpigidis	8	0	2	0	2	12
4	11	FW	(Slovakia) Miroslav Stoch	5	2	2	2	0	11
5	10	FW	(Spain) Lucas	9	0	0	0	1	10
6	99	MF	(Liberia) Sekou Oliseh	3	2	0	0	0	5
7	15	DF	(Portugal) Miguel Vítor	4	0	0	0	1	5
8	66	MF	(Israel) Bibras Natcho	2	0	1	0	0	3
9	61	FW	(Czech Republic) Tomáš Necid	1	1	0	1	0	3
10		FW	(Greece) Efthimis Koulouris	1	2	0	0	0	3
11	8	MF	(Netherlands) Hedwiges Maduro	2	1	0	0	0	3
12	25	MF	(Romania) Costin Lazăr	2	0	0	0	0	2
13	28	MF	(Greece) Kostas Katsouranis	2	0	0	0	0	2
14	70	DF	(Greece) Stelios Kitsiou	1	1	0	0	0	2
15	4	DF	(Greece) Giorgos Katsikas	2	0	0	0	0	2
16	3	DF	(Greece) Georgios Tzavellas	2	0	0	0	0	2
17	16	DF	(Brazil) Lino	1	0	0	0	0	1
18	6	MF	(Greece) Alexandros Tziolis	1	0	0	0	0	1
19	16	MF	(Greece) Ergys Kaçe	1	0	0	0	0	1
20	20	FW	(Netherlands) Danny Hoesen	1	0	0	0	0	1
21	40	MF	(Belgium) Maarten Martens	0	1	0	0	0	1
22	7	MF	(Greece) Giorgos Georgiadis	0	1	0	0	0	1
23	96	MF	(Greece) Stelios Pozoglou	0	0	0	0	1	1
24	77	MF	(Greece) Sotiris Ninis	0	0	0	0	1	1
Own goals				3	0	0	0	1	4
TOTALS				68	19	8	4	10	109

=== Disciplinary record ===
No.	Pos	Nat	Name	Super League			Greek Cup			Playoffs			Champions League			Europa League			Total			Notes
No.	Pos	Nat	Name	Yellow card	(yellow card) (yellow-red card)	Red card	Yellow card	(yellow card) (yellow-red card)	Red card	Yellow card	(yellow card) (yellow-red card)	Red card	Yellow card	(yellow card) (yellow-red card)	Red card	Yellow card	(yellow card) (yellow-red card)	Red card	Yellow card	(yellow card) (yellow-red card)	Red card	Notes
33	FW	(Greece)	Stefanos Athanasiadis	11			4			2			2						19			
3	DF	(Greece)	Georgios Tzavellas	8			2	1		1	1								11	2		
25	MF	(Romania)	Costin Lazăr	7						1			2			3			13			
70	DF	(Greece)	Stelios Kitsiou	7			1						2			2			12			
26	MF	(Albania)	Ergys Kaçe	4		1	4			1						1			10		1	
11	MF	(Slovakia)	Miroslav Stoch	4			1		1	1			2			1			9		1	
28	MF	(Greece)	Kostas Katsouranis	5	1			1					1					1	6	2	1	
15	DF	(Portugal)	Miguel Vítor	4		1	1			1			2						8		1	
2	DF	(Greece)	Giannis Skondras	4			1			2						1			8			
6	MF	(Greece)	Alexandros Tziolis	4									2			1			7			
9	MF	(Serbia)	Zvonimir Vukić	5			1												6			
16	DF	(Brazil)	Lino	4												1			5			
66	MF	(Israel)	Bibras Natcho	2			1		1	1									4		1	
21	DF	(Greece)	Nikos Spyropoulos	3			1												4			
71	GK	(Greece)	Panagiotis Glykos	2			2												4			
10	MF	(Spain)	Lucas	3															3			
61	FW	(Czech Republic)	Tomáš Necid	3															3			
29	DF	(Argentina)	Juan Insaurralde	3															3			
8	MF	(Netherlands)	Hedwiges Maduro	2												1			3			
77	MF	(Greece)	Sotiris Ninis	2															2			
14	FW	(Greece)	Dimitris Salpigidis	1									1						2			
22	DF	(Greece)	Dimitris Konstantinidis	1			1												2			
13	DF	(Spain)	Íñigo López	1															1			
1	GK	(Spain)	Jacobo	1															1			
7	MF	(Greece)	Giorgos Georgiadis	1															1			
	FW	(Greece)	Efthimis Koulouris	1															1			
50	GK	(Greece)	Asterios Giakoumis	1															1			
	DF	(Albania)	Kristi Qose	1															1			
4	DF	(Greece)	Giorgos Katsikas													1			1			
			TOTAL	95	1	2	20	2	2	10	1	0	14	0	0	12	0	1	151	4	5	

Last updated: 2017

Source: Match reports in competitive matches, superleaguegreece.net, uefa.com, soccerway.com
Only competitive matches
Ordered by (red card) , (yellow card) (yellow-red card) and (yellow card)
(yellow card) = Number of bookings; (yellow card) (yellow-red card) = Number of sending offs after a second yellow card; (red card) = Number of sending offs by a direct red card.

0 shown as blank
