= 2011–12 PAOK FC season =

PAOK
2011–12 season
- Chairman: Theodoros Zagorakis (until 26 January 2012); Zisis Vryzas (from 26 January 2012)
- Manager: László Bölöni
- Stadium: Toumba Stadium
- Super League: 5th (3rd in regular season)
- Greek Cup: Quarter-finals
- UEFA Europa League: Round of 32
- Top goalscorer: League: Stefanos Athanasiadis (12); All: Stefanos Athanasiadis (17)
- Highest home attendance: 24,285 vs Tottenham Hotspur (15 September 2011)
- Lowest home attendance: 3,102 vs Doxa Drama (18 April 2012)
Home colours	Away colours	Third colours

The 2011–12 season is PAOK's 53rd consecutive season in Super League Greece.

They will also compete in the Greek Cup and the UEFA Europa League.

== Players ==
=== Squad ===
Note: Flags indicate national team as defined under FIFA eligibility rules; some limited exceptions apply. Players may hold more than one non-FIFA nationality.

No.	Pos.	Nation	Player
1	GK	GRE	Kostas Chalkias
2	DF	GRE	Alexis Apostolopoulos
3	DF	GRE	Kostas Stafylidis
4	MF	GRE	Sotiris Balafas
5	MF	URU	Pablo Garcia
6	MF	GRE	Dimitris Stamou
7	FW	GRE	Giorgos Georgiadis
8	DF	ITA	Bruno Cirillo
9	FW	GRE	Dimitris Salpingidis
11	MF	FRA	Bertrand Robert
13	DF	GRE	Stelios Malezas
14	FW	GRE	Thanasis Papazoglou
16	DF	BRA	Alves Lino
18	MF	GRE	Giorgos Fotakis

No.	Pos.	Nation	Player
19	FW	GRE	Vassilis Papadopoulos
21	MF	SRB	Vladimir Ivić
25	MF	ROU	Costin Lazăr
27	DF	POL	Mirosław Sznaucner
28	MF	GRE	Stavros Tsoukalas
33	FW	GRE	Stefanos Athanasiadis
50	MF	GRE	Kostas Panagiotoudis
71	GK	GRE	Panagiotis Glikos
77	DF	BRA	Etto
88	FW	FRA	Frédéric Nimani
90	DF	GRE	Giorgos Katsikas
91	GK	CRO	Dario Krešić
95	MF	GRE	Dimitris Popovic
99	FW	GRE	Apostolos Giannou

Last updated: 30 January 2012
Source: Squad at PAOK FC official website

=== Transfers ===
==== In ====
Date	Pos.	Name	Moving from	Type	Transfer window	Ends	Fee
1 July 2011	MF	(France) Bertrand Robert	Panthrakikos	Transfer	Summer	2013	Free
17 July 2011	FW	(Greece) Giorgos Georgiadis	Panserraikos	Transfer	Summer	2014	N/A
21 July 2011	MF	(Romania) Costin Lazăr	Rapid București	Transfer	Summer	2014	Free
29 July 2011	MF	(Greece) Dimitris Stamou	Iraklis	Transfer	Summer	2014	Free
6 September 2011	MF	(Brazil) Juliano Spadacio	Rapid București	Transfer	Summer	2013	Free
9 September 2011	DF	(Brazil) Leonardo	Olympiacos	Transfer	Summer	2012	Free
30 September 2011	FW	(Greece) Apostolos Giannou	Kavala	Transfer	Summer	2014	Free
14 October 2011	DF	(Greece) Giorgos Katsikas	Iraklis	Transfer	Summer	2015	Free
30 January 2012	FW	(France) Frédéric Nimani	AS Monaco	Loan	Winter	2012	Free

==== Out ====
Date	Pos.	Name	Moving to	Type	Transfer window	Fee
	GK	(Greece) Fotis Koutzavasilis	Panserraikos	Loan	Summer	Free
	MF	(Albania) Ergys Kace	Anagennisi Epanomis	Loan	Summer	Free
30 June 2011	MF	(Morocco) Nabil El Zhar	Liverpool F.C.	Loan return	Summer	Free
30 June 2011	FW	(Bosnia and Herzegovina) Zlatan Muslimovic	Guizhou Renhe	End of contract	Summer	Free
30 June 2011	FW	(Argentina) Lucio Filomeno	Atlético de Rafaela	End of contract	Summer	Free
10 July 2011	MF	(Greece) Vasilios Koutsianikoulis	Ergotelis	Contract termination	Summer	Free
13 July 2011	MF	(Spain) Victor Vitolo	Panathinaikos	Contract termination	Summer	Free
5 August 2011	DF	(Greece) Vangelis Georgiou	Anagennisi Epanomi	Contract termination	Summer	Free
12 August 2011	FW	(Greece) Lazaros Moisiadis	Apollon Kalamarias	Loan	Summer	Free
16 August 2011	DF	(Greece) Eleftherios Sakellariou	Kerkyra	Loan	Summer	Free
29 August 2011	DF	(Italy) Mirko Savini		Contract termination	Summer	Free
31 August 2011	GK	(Greece) Asterios Giakoumis	Agrotikos Asteras	Loan	Summer	Free
14 December 2011	DF	(Brazil) Leonardo	Grêmio Barueri	Contract termination	Winter	Free
21 December 2011	MF	(Colombia) Diego Arias	Cruzeiro	Contract termination	Winter	Free
28 December 2011	MF	(Brazil) Juliano Spadacio	Astra Ploiești	Contract termination	Winter	Free
2 January 2012	DF	(Chile) Pablo Contreras	Colo-Colo	Contract termination	Winter	Free
3 January 2012	MF	(Portugal) Vieirinha	VfL Wolfsburg	Transfer	Winter	€4.5M (33% to Porto)

Last updated: 31 January 2012

== Technical staff ==
Position	Staff
First team head coach	(Romania) László Bölöni
Assistant coach	(Portugal) Joaquim Preto
Goalkeeping coach	(Greece) Stefanos Aivaliotis
Physical fitness coach	(Greece) Nikos Karydas
Technical directors	(Greece) Pantelis Konstantinidis (Greece) Zisis Vryzas
General manager	(Greece) Konstantinos Iosifidis

Source: PAOK FC official website

== Kit ==
Supplier: Puma
Sponsor(s): Pame Stoixima, Pepsi Max

Home	Away	Third	Goalkeeper's

Source: PAOK FC official website, PAOK web tv, paok24.com

== Pre-season and friendlies ==
Date	Place	Opponents	Result F – A	Source
9 July 2011	Düsseldorf	Fortuna Düsseldorf	1–2	Report Archived 2012-03-28 at the Wayback Machine
12 July 2011	Groningen	Groningen	2–3	Report
13 July 2011	Zutphen	CSKA Sofia	2–3	Report
17 July 2011	Ennepetal	Eupen	2–0	Report
22 July 2011	Thessaloniki	Pierikos	1–1	Source
10 August 2011	Limassol	Apollon Limassol	0–1	Report Archived 2011-10-04 at the Wayback Machine

Date	Place	Opponents	Result F – A	Source
11 August 2011	Larnaca	Anorthosis	0–1	Report
19 August 2011	Thessaloniki	Apollon Kalamarias	2–1	Report Archived 2011-09-15 at the Wayback Machine
2 September 2011	Serres	Panserraikos	1–0	Report Archived 2012-03-28 at the Wayback Machine
8 October 2011	Epanomi	Anagennisi Epanomi	2–2	Report Archived 2011-10-12 at the Wayback Machine
7 December 2011	Giannitsa	Anagennisi Giannitsa	2–0	Report Archived 2011-12-08 at the Wayback Machine
11 January 2012	Thessaloniki	Apollon Kalamarias	5–1	Report Archived 2012-01-14 at the Wayback Machine

Last updated: 10 January 2012
Source: Preseason Friendlies in PAOK FC official site

== Competitions ==
=== Overview ===
Competition	Started round	Current position / round	Final position / round	First match	Last match
Super League	—	—	3rd	28 August 2011	22 April 2012
Playoffs	2nd	—	4th	2 May 2012	20 May 2012
Greek Cup	Fourth Round	—	Quarter-Finals	21 December 2011	25 January 2012
UEFA Europa League	Third qualifying round	—	Round of 32	28 July 2011	23 February 2012

Updated to match played 20 May 2012
Source: Competitions

Competition	Record							
Competition	Pld	W	D	L	GF	GA	GD	Win %
Super League Greece	30	14	8	8	45	27	+18	46.67
Greek Cup	3	2	0	1	6	2	+4	66.67
UEFA Europa League	12	6	5	1	18	10	+8	50.00
UEFA play-offs	6	2	1	3	3	6	−3	33.33
Total	51	24	14	13	72	45	+27	47.06

Source: Competitions

== Super League ==
=== League table ===
Pos	Team	Pld	W	D	L	GF	GA	GD	Pts	Qualification or relegation
1	Olympiacos (C)	30	23	4	3	70	17	+53	73	Qualification for the Champions League group stage
2	Panathinaikos (Note: Panathinaikos was docked three points following severe crowd violence during a match against Olympiacos and lost the game 0–3.)	30	22	3	5	54	23	+31	66	Qualification for the Play-offs
3	PAOK	30	14	8	8	45	27	+18	50 (Note: Head-to-head points: PAOK 4, Atromitos 1.)	Qualification for the Play-offs
4	Atromitos	30	13	11	6	32	26	+6	50	Qualification for the Play-offs
5	AEK Athens	30	13	9	8	36	30	+6	48	Qualification for the Play-offs

Source: Super League Greece
Rules for classification: 1) Points, 2) Head-to-head points, 3) Head-to-head goal difference.
If in current league table there are tied teams after applying criteria 1 to 3, they are considered to share places and listed in Greek language alphabetic order.
If in final league table there are still tied teams after applying criteria 1 to 3, a decision match (or matches if they are more than two) are to be played but only in three cases: to determine the champion, to fill spots in the play-off or to determine the teams to be relegated. In any other case, the final standings of tied teams are determined with a public draw
(C) Champions

=== Results summary ===
Overall								Home						Away					
Pld	W	D	L	GF	GA	GD	Pts	W	D	L	GF	GA	GD	W	D	L	GF	GA	GD
30	14	8	8	45	27	+18	50	8	3	4	22	13	+9	6	5	4	23	14	+9

Last updated: 22 April 2012.
Source: Competitive matches

=== Results by round ===
Round	1	2	3	4	5	6	7	8	9	10	11	12	13	14	15	16	17	18	19	20	21	22	23	24	25	26	27	28	29	30
Ground	H	A	A	H	A	H	A	H	A	H	H	A	H	A	H	A	H	H	A	H	A	H	A	H	A	A	H	A	H	A
Result	W	L	W	W	L	D	D	L	L	W	D	D	W	W	W	D	W	W	W	L	W	D	W	L	D	W	L	D	W	L
Position	2	5	2	1	2	2	4	5	6	5	5	6	5	5	4	4	4	4	3	4	3	3	3	3	4	4	4	4	3	3

Source: PAOK at Super League Greece official site and PAOK at soccerway.com
A = Away; H = Home; W = Win; D = Draw; L = Loss

=== Matches ===
28 August 2011 1	PAOK	1–0	Skoda Xanthi	Thessaloniki
21:30 EEST (UTC+03)	Vieirinha 6', (yellow card) 84'; Etto (yellow card) 44'; Arias (yellow card) 59'; Balafas (yellow card) 74'	Report; Report	Vallas (yellow card) 9'; Vasilakakis (yellow card) 38'; Dani (yellow card) 86'	Stadium: Toumba Stadium; Attendance: 13,791; Referee: Dimitrios Thanos (Grevena)

10 September 2011 2	Ergotelis	2–1	PAOK	Heraklion
19:30 EEST (UTC+03)	Romano (yellow card) 20'; Budimir (yellow card) 23', (goal) 87'; Hieblinger (yellow card) 35'; Jovanovic (yellow card) 46'; Leal (yellow card) 74', (goal) 85'	Report; Report	Arias (yellow card) 31' (yellow-red card) 54'; Balafas (yellow card) 50', (goal) 68'; Lino (yellow card) 82'	Stadium: Pankritio Stadium; Attendance: 1,758; Referee: Dimitrios Styliaras (Aitoloacarnania)

18 September 2011 3	Panionios	1–2	PAOK	Nea Smyrni
18:15 EEST (UTC+03)	Estoyanoff 35', (yellow card) 79'; Jonsson (yellow card) 90+3'	Report; Report	Athanasiadis 16'; Salpingidis 64'	Stadium: Nea Smyrni Stadium; Attendance: 3,493; Referee: Petros Konstantineas (Messenia)

25 September 2011 4	PAOK	3–0	AEK	Thessaloniki
20:30 EEST (UTC+03)	Vieirinha 16'; Krešić (yellow card) 21'; Athanasiadis 37', (yellow card) 75'; Salpingidis 45+1'; Arias (yellow card) 60'	Report; Report	Karabelas (yellow card) 17'; Vargas (yellow card) 26'; Dellas (yellow card) 37'; Cala (yellow card) 44'; Makos (yellow card) 88'	Stadium: Toumba Stadium; Attendance: 19,235; Referee: Anastasios Kakos (Corfu)

2 October 2011 5	Olympiacos	2–1	PAOK	Piraeus
20:30 EEST (UTC+03)	Fuster 35'; Djebbour 42', (yellow card) 47'; Ibagaza (yellow card) 44'; Mirallas (yellow card) 82'	Report	Balafas 25'; Etto (yellow card) 52'	Stadium: Karaiskakis Stadium; Attendance: 28,772; Referee: Michalis Koukoulakis (Heraklion)

16 October 2011 6	PAOK	0–0	OFI	Thessaloniki
20:30 EEST (UTC+03)	García (yellow card) 89'	Report; Report	Bulut (yellow card) 37'; Mantzios (yellow card) 73'	Stadium: Toumba Stadium; Attendance: 9,951; Referee: Stavros Tritsonis (Athens)

23 October 2011 7	Aris	1–1	PAOK	Thessaloniki
20:30 EEST (UTC+03)	Lazaridis 3'; Vellidis (yellow card) 45+1'; Prittas (yellow card) 79'; Umbides (yellow card) 84'; Sankaré (yellow card) 84'	Report	Papazoglou 48', (yellow card) 51'; Contreras (yellow card) 54'; Ivić (yellow card) 90+1'	Stadium: Kleanthis Vikelidis Stadium; Attendance: 12,320; Referee: Athanasios Giachos (Chios)

30 October 2011 8	PAOK	1–3	Panathinaikos	Thessaloniki
19:30 EET (UTC+02)	Etto (yellow card) 59'; Vieirinha 85' (pen.); Fotakis (yellow card) 90+2'	Report	Cleyton 33'; Zeca (yellow card) 51'; Quincy 56'; Leto 70'; Simão (yellow card) 84'	Stadium: Toumba Stadium; Attendance: 19,002; Referee: Michael Koukoulakis (Heraklion)

6 November 2011 9	Asteras Tripolis	1–0	PAOK	Tripoli
17:15 EET (UTC+02)	Juanito (yellow card) 13'; Perrone 44', (yellow card) 77'; Juli (yellow card) 57'; Kostoulas (yellow card) 68'	Report	Malezas (yellow card) 54'; Papazoglou (yellow card) 90+4'	Stadium: Asteras Tripolis Stadium; Attendance: 1,892; Referee: Alexandros Aretopoulos (Trikala)

20 November 2011 10	PAOK	3–0	Panetolikos	Thessaloniki
19:30 EET (UTC+02)	Vieirinha 7' (pen.); Salpingidis (yellow card) 35'; Papazoglou 53', (yellow card) 54'; Spadacio 56'	Report	Addy (red card) 6'	Stadium: Toumba Stadium; Attendance: 9,975; Referee: Giorgos Daskalopoulos (Corinthia)

26 November 2011 11	PAOK	0–0	Kerkyra	Thessaloniki
17:15 EET (UTC+02)	Stafylidis (yellow card) 47'; Athanasiadis (yellow card) 90+5'	Report	Lovin (yellow card) 50'; Hable (yellow card) 70'; Osman (yellow card) 85'; Galinović (yellow card) 90+2'	Stadium: Toumba Stadium; Attendance: 9,908; Referee: Andreas Pappas (Athens)

4 December 2011 12	PAS Giannina	2–2	PAOK	Ioannina
17:15 EET (UTC+02)	Bagayoko 6', 49'; Pantos (yellow card) 20'; Vila (yellow card) 32'; Tzimopoulos (yellow card) 72'; Bouzid (yellow card) 90+4'	Report	Salpingidis (yellow card) 14'; Athanasiadis 17', (yellow card) 90+5'; Lazăr 73' (pen.), (yellow card) 74'; Papazoglou (yellow card) 81'	Stadium: Zosimades Stadium; Attendance: 3,446; Referee: Alexandros Aretopoulos (Trikala)

10 December 2011 13	PAOK	3–1	Atromitos	Thessaloniki
17:15 EET (UTC+02)	Lino 19'; Vieirinha 29' (pen.); Malezas (yellow card) 80'; Athanasiadis 90+3'	Report	Ballas (yellow card) 18'; Pitu Garcia (yellow card) 31'; Brito 60'; Mitroglou (yellow card) 90+5'; Sfakianakis (yellow card) 90+5'	Stadium: Toumba Stadium; Attendance: 9,880; Referee: Stavros Tritsonis (Athens)

18 December 2011 14	Doxa Drama	0–2	PAOK	Thessaloniki
15:00 EET (UTC+02)	Vertzos (yellow card) 15'; Aravidis (yellow card) 20'; Kanakoudis (yellow card) 62'; Wanderson (yellow card) 71'; Leandro (yellow card) 83'	Report	Salpingidis 27'; Fotakis 40'; Balafas (yellow card) 67'	Stadium: Kaftanzoglio Stadium; Attendance: 2,890; Referee: Charalampos Kalogeropoulos (Athens)

4 January 2012 15	PAOK	3–1	Levadiakos	Thessaloniki
17:15 EET (UTC+02)	Ivić 21'; Athanasiadis 49', 84'; Malezas (yellow card) 69'; Giannou (yellow card) 82'; Lazăr (yellow card) 90+1'	Report	Moulopoulos (yellow card) 79'; Napoleoni 90+3'	Stadium: Toumba Stadium; Attendance: 9,933; Referee: Christos Mitsios (Epirus)

8 January 2012 16	Skoda Xanthi	0–0	PAOK	Xanthi
15:00 EET (UTC+02)	Edimar (yellow card) 68'; Bertos (yellow card) 79'	Report	Sznaucner (yellow card) 56'; Malezas (yellow card) 58'	Stadium: Skoda Xanthi Arena; Attendance: 1,849; Referee: Anastasios Sidiropoulos (Dodecanese)

15 January 2012 17	PAOK	2–1	Ergotelis	Thessaloniki
17:15 EET (UTC+02)	Fotakis (yellow card) 19'; Salpingidis 55'; Lino 80' (pen.)	Report	Koutsianikoulis 32'; Beto (yellow card) 59'; Gialousis (yellow card) 78'	Stadium: Toumba Stadium; Attendance: 8,260; Referee: Dimitrios Thanos (Grevena)

21 January 2012 18	PAOK	1–0	Panionios	Thessaloniki
19:30 EET (UTC+02)	Athanasiadis 10'; Malezas (yellow card) 78'; Fotakis (yellow card) 90+2'	Report		Stadium: Toumba Stadium; Attendance: 7,038; Referee: Michalis Voskakis (Rethymno)

29 January 2012 19	AEK Athens	0–2	PAOK	Marousi
19:30 EET (UTC+02)	Manolas (yellow card) 68'; Argyriou (yellow card) 78'; Arabatzis (yellow card) 85'	Report	Georgiadis 16'; Sznaucner (yellow card) 30'; Fotakis (yellow card) 37'; Athanasiadis 66', (yellow card) 67'	Stadium: Athens Olympic Stadium; Attendance: 6,110; Referee: Anastasios Sidiropoulos (Dodecanese)

5 February 2012 20	PAOK	0–2	Olympiacos	Thessaloniki
19:30 EET (UTC+02)	Stafylidis (yellow card) 9'; García (yellow card) 68'; Fotakis (yellow card) 73'; Lazăr (red card) 76'	Report	Abdoun 5', (yellow card) 6'; Mirallas 18'; Ibagaza (yellow card) 52'; Djebbour (yellow card) 76'	Stadium: Toumba Stadium; Attendance: 18,299; Referee: Athanasios Giachos (Chios)

11 February 2012 21	OFI	0–2	PAOK	Heraklion
19:30 EET (UTC+02)	López (yellow card) 51'; Tavlaridis (yellow card) 84'	Report	Malezas (yellow card) 17'; Giannou 24', 38'; Salpingidis (yellow card) 50'; Fotakis (yellow card) 78'; Krešić (yellow card) 87'	Stadium: Theodoros Vardinogiannis Stadium; Attendance: 3,646; Referee: Georgios Kominis (Thesprotia)

19 February 2012 22	PAOK	0–0	Aris	Thessaloniki
19:30 EET (UTC+02)	García (yellow card) 14'; Athanasiadis (yellow card) 18'; Krešić (yellow card) 63'	Report	Kasnaferis (yellow card) 6'; Lazaridis (yellow card) 18'; Faty (yellow card) 37'; Umbides (yellow card) 68'; Triantafyllakos (yellow card) 90+3'	Stadium: Toumba Stadium; Attendance: 16,041; Referee: Anastasios Sidiropoulos (Dodecanese)

4 March 2012 23	Panathinaikos	0–2	PAOK	Marousi
19:30 EET (UTC+02)	Vitolo (yellow card) 43'; Sarriegi (yellow card) 50'; Bjärsmyr (yellow card) 53'; Katsouranis (yellow card) 71'	Report	Nimani (yellow card) 38'; Lino 52' (pen.); Fotakis (yellow card) 70'; Salpingidis 84'; García (yellow card) 90+1'; Malezas (yellow card) 90+1'	Stadium: Athens Olympic Stadium; Attendance: 0 Referee: Michalis Voskakis (Rethymno)

10 March 2012 24	PAOK	2–3	Asteras Tripolis	Thessaloniki
19:30 EET (UTC+02)	Athanasiadis 31'; Lazăr (yellow card) 51'; Georgiadis 54'; Cirillo (yellow card) 57'	Report	Perrone 2', 17'; Navarro 10'; Martins (yellow card) 36'; Rayos (yellow card) 64'; Pipinis (yellow card) 90+2'	Stadium: Toumba Stadium; Attendance: 6,894; Referee: Georgios Kominis (Thesprotia)

18 March 2012 25	Panetolikos	1–1	PAOK	Agrinio
17:15 EET (UTC+02)	Theodoridis 28'	Report	Lino (yellow card) 38'; Lazăr (yellow card) 62'; Stafylidis (yellow card) 78'; Cirillo 85'; Nimani (yellow card) 87'; García (yellow card) 87'	Stadium: Panetolikos Stadium; Attendance: 5,401; Referee: Athanasios Giachos (Chios)

25 March 2012 26	Kerkyra	0–4	PAOK	Corfu
19:30 EET (UTC+02)		Report	García 15'; Sznaucner (yellow card) 29'; Cirillo (yellow card) 35'; Athanasiadis 45+2'; Lazăr 54', 64'; Giannou (yellow card) 90+2'	Stadium: Kerkyra Stadium; Attendance: 1,281; Referee: Alexandros Aretopoulos (Trikala)

1 April 2012 27	PAOK	1–2	PAS Giannina	Thessaloniki
19:00 EET (UTC+02)	Papazoglou 71'	Report	Vila 7'; Vanderson (yellow card) 30'; Georgiou 70'; Andralas (yellow card) 82'; Kipouros (yellow card) 90+1'	Stadium: Toumba Stadium; Attendance: 9,587; Referee: Giorgos Daskalopoulos (Corinthia)

8 April 2012 28	Atromitos	0–0	PAOK	Peristeri
19:00 EET (UTC+02)		Report	Fotakis (red card) 37'; Salpingidis (yellow card) 70'; Chalkias (yellow card) 90+2'	Stadium: Peristeri Stadium; Attendance: 3,274; Referee: Petros Konstantineas (Messenia)

18 April 2012 29	PAOK	2–0	Doxa Drama	Thessaloniki
19:00 EET (UTC+02)	Panagiotoudis 12'; Nimani 59'; Stafylidis (yellow card) 70'; Etto (yellow card) 71'	Report	Soiledis (yellow card) 33'; Psychogios (yellow card) 41'	Stadium: Toumba Stadium; Attendance: 3,014; Referee: Charalampos Kalogeropoulos (Athens)

22 April 2012 30	Levadiakos	4–3	PAOK	Livadeia
19:00 EET (UTC+02)	Melissas 23'; Vasileiou 48'; Napoleoni 87', (yellow card) 88'; Machairas 90+2'	Report	Athanasiadis 21', 83', (yellow card) 90'; Nimani (yellow card) 58'; Cirillo (yellow card) 63'; Ivić 78'	Stadium: Levadia Municipal Stadium; Attendance: 696; Referee: Gerasimos Ditsos (Preveza)

Last updated: 22 April 2012
Source: Super League Greece, PAOK FC official website

=== Play-offs ===
Pos	Team	Pld	W	D	L	GF	GA	GD	Pts	Qualification
2	Panathinaikos	6	3	1	2	5	4	+1	14	Qualification for the Champions League third qualifying round
3	AEK Athens	6	3	0	3	7	5	+2	9	Ineligible for the 2012–13 European competitions. (Note: AEK Athens were not licensed to play in the Europa League 2012–2013 and therefore were replaced by the 6th placed team in the league table, Asteras Tripolis, qualified for the second qualifying round. This meant that PAOK were qualified for the third qualifying round of the Europa League and Atromitos to the Europa League play-offs.)
4	Atromitos	6	2	2	2	6	6	0	8	Qualification for the Europa League play-off round (Note: Atromitos lost the final of the 2011–12 Greek Football Cup against Champions League-qualified team Olympiacos. As a consequence, the three Europa League spots were distributed by the final standings of this group.)
5	PAOK	6	2	1	3	3	6	−3	7	Qualification for the Europa League third qualifying round

Source: Super League Greece: Standings and Schedule
Rules for classification: Rules for classification: 1) points; 2) head-to-head points; 3) head-to-head goal difference; 4) classification of regular season.

==== Results by round ====
Round	1	2	3	4	5	6
Ground	H	A	H	A	A	H
Result	W	D	W	L	L	L
Position	2	2	1	2	3	4

Source: Super League Greece
A = Away; H = Home; W = Win; D = Draw; L = Loss

==== Matches ====
2 May 2012 1	PAOK	1–0	AEK Athens	Thessaloniki
20:00 EET (UTC+02)	Nimani (yellow card) 85'; Georgiadis 87', (yellow card) 88'; Ivić (yellow card) 90+2'	Report	Makos (yellow card) 63'; Liberopoulos (yellow card) 80'; Kafes (yellow card) 84'	Stadium: Toumba Stadium; Attendance: 9,771; Referee: Anastasios Kakos (Corfu)

7 May 2012 2	Atromitos	1–1	PAOK	Peristeri
17:45 EET (UTC+02)	Skondras (yellow card) 61'; Mitroglou 67'	Report	Salpingidis 29', (yellow card) 72'; Malezas (yellow card) 57'	Stadium: Peristeri Stadium; Attendance: 2,651; Referee: Athanasios Giachos (Chios)

10 May 2012 3	PAOK	1–0	Panathinaikos	Thessaloniki
20:00 EET (UTC+02)	Salpingidis 32'; Lazăr (yellow card) 58'; Garcia (yellow card) 62'; Ivić (yellow card) 77'; Chalkias (yellow card) 79'; Cirillo (yellow card) 86'	Report	Katsouranis (yellow card) 30'	Stadium: Toumba Stadium; Attendance: 11,484; Referee: Stavros Tritsonis (Athens)

13 May 2012 4	Panathinaikos	2–0	PAOK	Marousi
19:15 EET (UTC+02)	Sarriegi (yellow card) 53'; Toché 62'; Simão (yellow card) 70'; Cleyton 86'	Report	Ivić (yellow card) 72'	Stadium: Athens Olympic Stadium; Attendance: 3,012; Referee: Athanasios Giachos (Chios)

16 May 2012 5	AEK Athens	2–0	PAOK	Marousi
20:00 EET (UTC+02)	Liberopoulos 33'; Vargas (yellow card) 49'; Kondoes (yellow card) 66'; Leonardo 85'	Report	Apostolopoulos (yellow card) 12'; García (yellow card) 21' (yellow-red card) 65'; Fotakis (yellow card) 59' (yellow-red card) 78'	Stadium: Athens Olympic Stadium; Attendance: 8,293; Referee: Michael Koukoulakis (Heraklion)

20 May 2012 6	PAOK	0–1	Atromitos	Thessaloniki
20:00 EET (UTC+02)		Report	Fytanidis 12'; Ikonomou (yellow card) 90+3'	Stadium: Toumba Stadium; Attendance: 9,444; Referee: Anastasios Sidiropoulos (Dodecanese)

Last updated:20 May 2012
Source: Super League Greece, PAOK FC official website

== Greek Cup ==
=== Fourth round ===
21 December 2011 Fourth round	Ethnikos Asteras	Suspended^{1}	PAOK	Kaisariani
16:00 EET (UTC+02)		Report		Stadium: Michalis Kritikopoulos Stadium; Referee: Michalis Voskakis (Rethymno)

==== Fifth round ====
18 January 2012 Fifth round	PAOK	2–0	AEK	Thessaloniki
20:00 EET (UTC+02)	Athanasiadis (yellow card) 23', (goal) 54'; Lino 33' (pen.); Salpingidis (yellow card) 83'	Report; Report	Cala (yellow card) 62'; José Carlos (yellow card) 82'	Stadium: Toumba Stadium; Attendance: 15,095; Referee: Athanasios Giachos (Chios)

=== Quarter-finals ===
25 January 2012 Quarter-Finals	PAOK	1–2 (a.e.t.)	Atromitos	Thessaloniki
17:00 EET (UTC+02)	Lino 29' (pen.); Fotakis (yellow card) 32'; Lazăr (yellow card) 57'; Glikos (yellow card) 88'	Report; Report	Thomas (yellow card) 27'; Sfakianakis (yellow card) 86'; Epstein (yellow card) 90'; Fytanidis 90'; Brito 91'; Karagounis (yellow card) 111'; Skondras (yellow card) 112'	Stadium: Toumba Stadium; Attendance: 8,901; Referee: Georgios Kominis, (Thesprotia)

Last updated: 25 January 2012
Source: epo.gr, PAOK FC official website
^{1}The match against Ethnikos Asteras was suspended in the 15th minute after an assistant referee was hit by a seat thrown from the stands with the score at 0–0. On 29 December 2011, with a decision by the Hellenic Football Federation the match was awarded to PAOK.

== UEFA Europa League ==
=== Third qualifying round ===
28 July 2011 1st Leg	Vålerenga (Norway)	0–2	(Greece) PAOK	Oslo, Norway
19:00 CET	Ogude (yellow card) 90'	Report	García (yellow card) 48', (goal) 90'; Vieirinha 72'; Etto (yellow card) 87'	Stadium: Ullevaal Stadion; Attendance: 3,019; Referee: Ante Vučemilović-Šimunović Jr. (Croatia)

4 August 2011 2nd Leg	PAOK (Greece)	3–0 (5–0 agg.)	(Norway) Vålerenga	Thessaloniki, Greece
20:00 CET	Vieirinha 45'; Athanasiadis 49'; Fotakis 58'	Report	Fellah (yellow card) 67'	Stadium: Toumba Stadium; Attendance: 22,168; Referee: Kristo Tohver (Estonia)

=== Play-off round ===
18 August 2011 1st Leg	PAOK (Greece)	2–0	(Ukraine) Karpaty Lviv	Thessaloniki, Greece
20:00 CET	Athanasiadis 15'; García (yellow card) 45+2'; Lino 56'	Report	Zenjov (yellow card) 40'	Stadium: Toumba Stadium; Attendance: 21,424; Referee: Robert Malek (Poland)

25 August 2011 2nd Leg	Karpaty Lviv (Ukraine)	1–1 (1–3 agg.)	(Greece) PAOK	Lviv, Ukraine
21:00 CET	Lucas (yellow card) 40', (goal) 45' (pen.); Fedetskiy (yellow card) 45+1' (yellow-red card) 69'; Tkachuk (yellow card) 54'; Gómez (yellow card) 89'	Report	Georgiadis (yellow card) 24'; Malezas (yellow card) 40'; Balafas (yellow card) 44', (goal) 55'; Etto (yellow card) 45'	Stadium: Ukraina Stadium; Attendance: 20,000; Referee: Fredy Fautrel (France)

=== Group stage ===
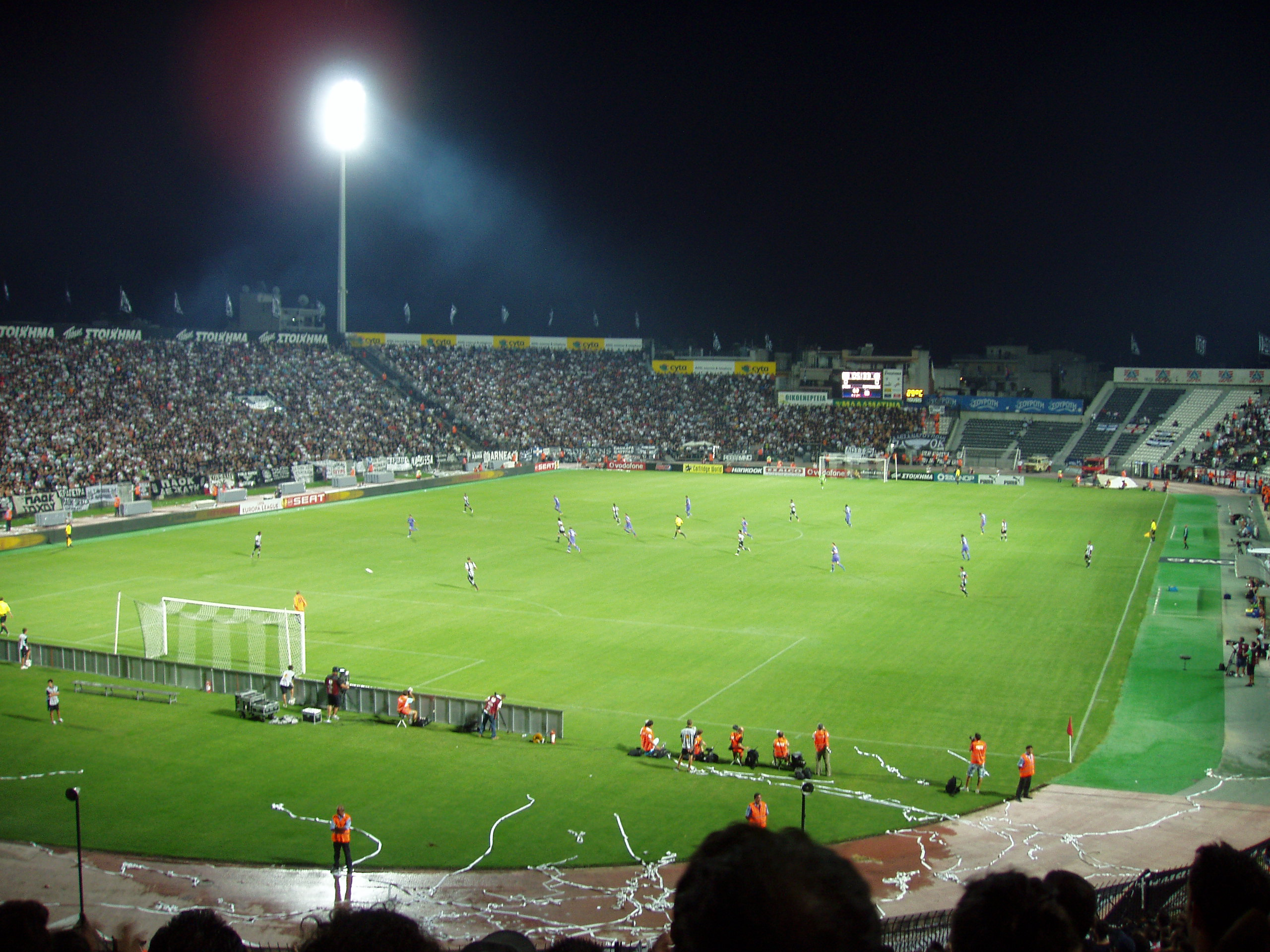
PAOK v Tottenham Hotsput at Toumba Stadium (15 September 2011)

Team	Pld	W	D	L	GF	GA	GD	Pts
(Greece) PAOK	6	3	3	0	10	6	+4	12
(Russia) Rubin Kazan	6	3	2	1	11	5	+6	11
(England) Tottenham Hotspur	6	3	1	2	9	4	+5	10
(Republic of Ireland) Shamrock Rovers	6	0	0	6	4	19	−15	0

15 September 2011 1	PAOK (Greece)	0–0	(England) Tottenham Hotspur	Thessaloniki, Greece
19:00 CET	Arias (yellow card) 38'; García (yellow card) 45'; Fotakis (yellow card) 53'	Report	Kane (yellow card) 28'; Cudicini (yellow card) 31'; Ćorluka (yellow card) 75'; Carroll (yellow card) 78' dos Santos (yellow card) 90'	Stadium: Toumba Stadium; Attendance: 24,285; Referee: Milorad Mažić (Serbia)

29 September 2011 2	Rubin Kazan (Russia)	2–2	(Greece) PAOK	Kazan, Russia
17:00 CET	Kuzmin (yellow card) 35'; Valdez 52'; Kasaev (yellow card) 60'; Dyadyun 66'; Navas (yellow card) 90'	Report	Athanasiadis 23'; Malezas (yellow card) 57'; Fotakis 81'; Etto (yellow card) 90+4'	Stadium: Central Stadium; Attendance: 14,350; Referee: Martin Hansson (Sweden)

20 October 2011 3	PAOK (Greece)	2–1	(Republic of Ireland) Shamrock Rovers	Thessaloniki, Greece
21:05 CET	Lazăr 12'; Sznaucner (yellow card) 47'; Vieirinha 63'	Report	O'Donnell (yellow card) 43'; Sheppard 48', (yellow card) 65'; Stevens (yellow card) 57'; Dennehy (yellow card) 76'	Stadium: Toumba Stadium; Attendance: 12,776; Referee: Tony Asumaa (Finland)

3 November 2011 4	Shamrock Rovers (Republic of Ireland)	1–3	(Greece) PAOK	Dublin, Republic of Ireland
19:00 CET	Dennehy 51'; Sullivan (yellow card) 53'	Report	Salpingidis 7', 38'; Fotakis 36', (yellow card) 51'; Cirillo (yellow card) 55'; Lino (yellow card) 62'	Stadium: Tallaght Stadium; Attendance: 6,124; Referee: Aleksei Kulbakov (Belarus)

30 November 2011 5	Tottenham Hotspur (England)	1–2	(Greece) PAOK	London, England
21:05 CET	Modrić 38' (pen.)	Report	Salpingidis 6'; Athanasiadis 13', (yellow card) 90+3'; Stafylidis (red card) 37'	Stadium: White Hart Lane; Attendance: 26,229; Referee: Bas Nijhuis, (Netherlands)

15 December 2011 6	PAOK (Greece)	1–1	(Russia) Rubin Kazan	Thessaloniki, Greece
19:00 CET	Lino (yellow card) 10'; Vieirinha 15' (pen.)	Report	Ryzhikov (red card) 13'; Valdez 48'	Stadium: Toumba Stadium; Attendance: 15,500; Referee: Daniele Orsato, (Italy)

==== Round of 32 ====
16 February 2012 1st Leg	Udinese (Italy)	0–0	(Greece) PAOK	Udine, Italy
21:05 CET		Report	Lazăr (yellow card) 66'; Fotakis (yellow card) 90'	Stadium: Stadio Friuli; Attendance: 11,641; Referee: Alberto Undiano Mallenco (Spain)

23 February 2012 2nd Leg	PAOK (Greece)	0–3 (0–3 agg.)	(Italy) Udinese	Thessaloniki, Greece
19:00 CET	Cirillo (yellow card) 14'; Sznaucner (yellow card) 25'; Garcia (yellow card) 30'; Malezas (yellow card) 50'	Report	Danilo 6'; Floro Flores 15', (yellow card) 54'; Benatia (yellow card) 50'; Domizzi 51' (pen.)	Stadium: Toumba Stadium; Attendance: 20,000; Referee: Tom Harald Hagen (Norway)

== Statistics ==
=== Squad statistics ===
				Total				Super League		UEFA Europa League		Greek Cup		
N	Pos.	Name	Nat.	GS	App	Gls	Min	App	Gls	App	Gls	App	Gls	Notes
1	GK	Kostas Chalkias	(Greece)	22	22		2030	19		3				
2	DF	Alexis Apostolopoulos	(Greece)	6	9		565	7		2				
3	DF	Kostas Stafylidis	(Greece)	17	20		1551	16		3		1		
4	MF	Sotiris Balafas	(Greece)	11	21	3	1269	15	2	3	1	3		^{Note 1}
5	MF	Pablo García	(Uruguay)	38	38	2	3392	27	1	8	1	3		^{Note 1}
7	FW	Giorgos Georgiadis	(Greece)	19	40	3	2031	30	3	10				
8	DF	Bruno Cirillo	(Italy)	32	35	1	3091	23	1	10		2		
9	FW	Dimitris Salpingidis	(Greece)	42	46	10	3619	35	7	8	3	3		^{Note 1}
11	MF	Bertrand Robert	(France)	4	15		453	10		3		2		
13	DF	Stelios Malezas	(Greece)	47	48		4373	33		12		3		^{Note 1}
14	FW	Thanasis Papazoglou	(Greece)	4	18	3	535	15	3	3				
16	DF	Lino	(Brazil)	40	42	6	3555	28	3	11	1	3	2	^{Note 1}
18	MF	Georgios Fotakis	(Greece)	40	42	4	3304	29	1	10	3	3		^{Note 1}
21	MF	Vladimir Ivić	(Serbia)	13	29	2	1409	22	2	5		2		
25	MF	Costin Lazăr	(Romania)	36	39	4	3038	26	3	10	1	3		^{Note 1}
27	DF	Mirosław Sznaucner	(Poland)	13	18		1355	12		5		1		
28	MF	Stavros Tsoukalas	(Greece)	1	8		162	6		2				
33	FW	Stefanos Athanasiadis	(Greece)	44	44	17	3986	30	12	11	4	3	1	^{Note 1}
50	MF	Kostas Panagiotoudis	(Greece)	2	3	1	178	3	1					
71	GK	Panagiotis Glikos	(Greece)	10	10		882	6		1		3		^{Note 1}
77	DF	Etto	(Brazil)	33	33		2818	21		9		3		^{Note 1}
88	FW	Frédéric Nimani	(France)	6	14	1	655	13	1	1				
90	DF	Giorgos Katsikas	(Greece)	5	5		389	5						
91	GK	Dario Krešić	(Croatia)	19	20		1793	12		8				
95	MF	Dimitris Popovic	(Greece)		1		17	1						
99	FW	Apostolos Giannou	(Greece)	6	16	2	717	14	2	2				
(10)	MF	Juliano Spadacio	(Brazil)	2	7	1	295	7	1					Out in Winter TW
(15)	DF	Pablo Contreras	(Chile)	10	11		795	6		5				Out in Winter TW
(20)	MF	Vieirinha	(Portugal)	23	23	9	1948	13	5	9	4	1		^{Note 1} Out in Winter TW
(60)	DF	Leonardo	(Brazil)	1	1		95	1						Out in Winter TW
(85)	MF	Diego Arias	(Colombia)	15	18		1316	8		10				Out in Winter TW

Last updated: 21 May 2012
Source: Match reports in competitive matches, superleaguegreece.net, uefa.com, paokfc.gr
Ordered by squad number
0 shown as blank

Note: The Playoffs statistics are included in the Super League column.
^{Note 1}On 21 December 2011, the Cup game against Ethnikos Asteras was suspended in the 15th minute. Only these 15 minutes of the game have been added to the column of "Minutes Played" of the table.

=== Goals ===
R	Player	Position	Super League	Europa League	Greek Cup	Total	Notes
1	(Greece) Stefanos Athanasiadis	CF	12	4	1	17	
2	(Greece) Dimitris Salpingidis	RW	7	3		10	
3	(Portugal) Vieirinha	LW	5	4		9	Out in Winter TW
4	(Brazil) Lino	LB	3	1	2	6	
5	(Greece) Giorgos Fotakis	AM	1	3		4	
5	(Romania) Costin Lazăr	DM	3	1		4	
7	(Greece) Sotiris Balafas	DM	2	1		3	
7	(Greece) Thanasis Papazoglou	CF	3			3	
7	(Greece) Giorgos Georgiadis	LW	3			3	
10	(Greece) Apostolos Giannou	CF	2			2	
10	(Uruguay) Pablo García	DM	1	1		2	
10	(Serbia) Vladimir Ivić	AM	2			2	
13	(Brazil) Juliano Spadacio	AM	1			1	Out in Winter TW
13	(Italy) Bruno Cirillo	DF	1			1	
13	(Greece) Kostas Panagiotoudis	DM	1			1	
13	(France) Frédéric Nimani	LW	1			1	

Last updated: 21 May 2012
Source: Match reports in Competitive matches
0 shown as blank

=== Assists ===
R	Player	Position	Super League	Europa League	Greek Cup	Total	Notes
1	(Brazil) Lino	LB	5	1		6	
1	(Romania) Costin Lazăr	DM	5	1		6	
3	(Portugal) Vieirinha	LW	4	1		5	Out in Winter TW
4	(Greece) Giorgos Georgiadis	LW		4		4	
4	(Greece) Stefanos Athanasiadis	CF	3	1		4	
6	(Greece) Dimitris Salpingidis	RW	2	1		3	
7	(Brazil) Etto	RB	1	1		2	
7	(Uruguay) Pablo García	DM	1	1		2	
7	(Greece) Apostolos Giannou	AM	2			2	
7	(Greece) Giorgios Fotakis	AM	1	1		2	
7	(Greece) Kostas Stafylidis	LB	2			2	
12	(Serbia) Vladimir Ivić	AM		1		1	
12	(France) Bertrand Robert	LW	1			1	
12	(France) Frédéric Nimani	LW	1			1	

Last updated: 21 May 2012
Source: Superleague, Europa League
0 shown as blank

=== Disciplinary record ===
No.	Pos	Nat	Name	Super League			Europa League			Greek Cup			Total			Notes
No.	Pos	Nat	Name	Yellow card	(yellow card) (yellow-red card)	Red card	Yellow card	(yellow card) (yellow-red card)	Red card	Yellow card	(yellow card) (yellow-red card)	Red card	Yellow card	(yellow card) (yellow-red card)	Red card	Notes
18	MF	(Greece)	Giorgos Fotakis	7	1	1	2			1			10	1	1	
25	MF	(Romania)	Costin Lazăr	5		1	1			1			7		1	
3	DF	(Greece)	Kostas Stafylidis	4					1				4		1	
5	MF	(Uruguay)	Pablo García	6	1		4						10	1		
85	MF	(Colombia)	Diego Arias	2	1		1						3	1		Out in Winter TW
13	DF	(Greece)	Stelios Malezas	8			3						11			
33	FW	(Greece)	Stefanos Athanasiadis	6			1			1			8			
77	DF	(Brazil)	Etto	4			3						7			
9	FW	(Greece)	Dimitris Salpingidis	5						1			6			
8	DF	(Italy)	Bruno Cirillo	4			2						6			
27	DF	(Poland)	Mirosław Sznaucner	3			2						5			
14	FW	(Greece)	Thanasis Papazoglou	4									4			
4	MF	(Greece)	Sotiris Balafas	3			1						4			
16	DF	(Brazil)	Lino	2			2						4			
88	FW	(France)	Frédéric Nimani	4									4			
21	MF	(Serbia)	Vladimir Ivić	4									4			
91	GK	(Croatia)	Dario Krešić	3									3			
99	FW	(Greece)	Apostolos Giannou	2									2			
7	FW	(Greece)	Giorgos Georgiadis	1			1						2			
71	GK	(Greece)	Kostas Chalkias	2									2			
15	DF	(Chile)	Pablo Contreras	1									1			Out in Winter TW
20	FW	(Portugal)	Vieirinha	1									1			Out in Winter TW
71	GK	(Greece)	Panagiotis Glikos							1			1			
2	DF	(Greece)	Alexis Apostolopoulos	1									1			
			TOTAL	82	3	2	23	0	1	5	0	0	110	3	3	

Last updated: 21 May 2012
Source: Match reports in competitive matches, superleaguegreece.net, uefa.com, paokfc.gr
Only competitive matches
Ordered by (red card) , (yellow card) (yellow-red card) and (yellow card)
(yellow card) = Number of bookings; (yellow card) (yellow-red card) = Number of sending offs after a second yellow card; (red card) = Number of sending offs by a direct red card.
0 shown as blank

=== Overall ===
	Total	Home	Away
Games played	50	26	24
Games won	23	14	9
Games drawn	14	5	9
Games lost	13	7	6
Biggest win	4–0 vs Kerkyra	3–0 vs Vålerenga; 3–0 vs AEK Athens; 3–0 vs Panetolikos	4–0 vs Kerkyra
Biggest loss	0–3 vs Udinese	0–3 vs Udinese	1–2 vs Ergotelis; 1–2 vs Olympiacos; 3–4 vs Levadiakos
Biggest win (League)	4–0 vs Kerkyra	3–0 vs AEK Athens; 3–0 vs Panetolikos	4–0 vs Kerkyra
Biggest win (Cup)	2–0 vs AEK Athens	2–0 vs AEK Athens	
Biggest win (Europe)	3–0 vs Vålerenga	3–0 vs Vålerenga	3–1 vs Shamrock Rovers
Biggest loss (League)	1–3 vs Panathinaikos	1–3 vs Panathinaikos	1–2 vs Ergotelis; 1–2 vs Olympiacos; 3–4 vs Levadiakos
Biggest loss (Cup)	1–2 vs Atromitos	1–2 vs Atromitos	
Biggest loss (Europe)	0–3 vs Udinese	0–3 vs Udinese	
Goals scored	69	35	34
Goals conceded	45	21	24
Goal difference	+24	+14	+10
Average GF per game	1.38	1.35	1.42
Average GA per game	0.9	0.81	1
Yellow cards	113	54	59
Red cards	6	1	5
Most appearances	(Greece) Stelios Malezas (48)	–	
Most minutes played	(Greece) Stelios Malezas (4373)	–	
Most goals	(Greece) Stefanos Athanasiadis (17)	–	
Most assists	(Brazil) Lino (Romania) Costin Lazăr (6)	–	
Winning rate	46%	53.85%	37.5%

Last updated: 21 May 2012
Source: Competitive matches

Note: In the games played and in the games won lines, is not included the cup game against Ethnikos Asteras that was suspended, but was awarded to PAOK.
