= Alexis Apostolopoulos =

Greek footballer (born 1991)

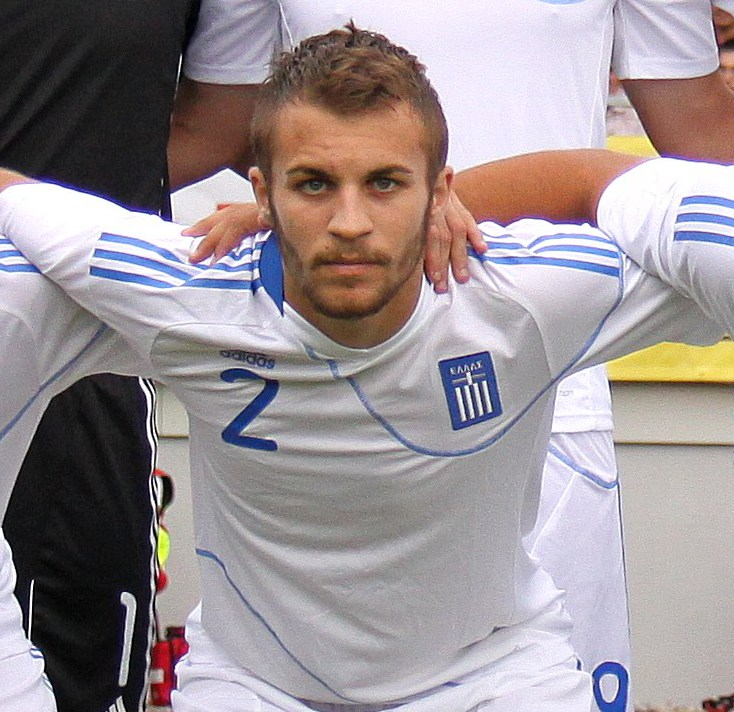

Personal information
- Full name: Alexandros Apostolopoulos
- Date of birth: 7 November 1991 (age 34)
- Place of birth: Pyrgos, Gargalianoi, Greece
- Height: 1.77 m (5 ft 9 1/2 in)
- Position: Right-back

Youth career
- 2008–2010: PAOK

Senior career*
Years	Team	Apps	(Gls)
2010–2014	PAOK	23	(0)
2010–2011	→ Zakynthos (loan)	15	(0)
2011–2012	→ Anagennisi Giannitsa (loan)	16	(0)
2013–2014	→ Veria (loan)	13	(0)
2014–2017	Platanias	57	(2)
2017–2020	PAS Giannina	47	(1)
2020–2021	Panachaiki	13	(0)
2021–2023	PAOK B	28	(0)

International career
2009–2010	Greece U19	6	(0)
2010–2013	Greece U21	9	(0)
- * Club domestic league appearances and goals as of 24 March 2022

Alexis Apostolopoulos (Greek: Αλέξης Αποστολόπουλος, born 7 November 1991) is a Greek professional footballer who plays as a right-back.

== Career ==
Alexis Apostolopoulos made his debut in Football League 2 with Zakynthos in September 2010.

Child of the infrastructure division of PAOK] Alexis Apostolopoulos football grew in Toumpa, where he made his first football steps rising from all parts of the Academies. Transferred on loan from PAOK 2011–12. Initially the group of Zakynthos and then in Anagennisi Giannitsa to return to the team in the summer of 2011, and under the guidance of László Bölöni to make his first appearances with PAOK.

His debut came in Dublin on 3 November 2011 in the last minutes of the match Shamrock Rovers – PAOK 1-3 for groups of 2010–11 UEFA Europa League, while in the Super League, the first participation and even as a key came in an away win against Panathinaikos – PAOK 0–2 at the Athens Olympic Stadium in Athens, on 4 March 2012.

With the Greece national under-19 football team, he had six appearances, making his debut on 6 October 2009 against the Faroe Islands, and had appearances with the Greece national under-21 football team.

The 2013–2014 season for Apostolopoulos started with a long loan to Veria because he was not in Huub Stevens plans. On 24 July 2017, Apostolopoulos signed with PAS Giannina.

== Club statistics ==
Club	Season	League		Cup		Europe		Total	
Club	Season	Apps	Goals	Apps	Goals	Apps	Goals	Apps	Goals
Zakynthos	2010–11	15	0	1	0	0	0	16	0
Anagennisi Giannitsa	2010–11	16	0	0	0	0	0	16	0
PAOK	2011–12	7	0	0	0	2	0	9	0
PAOK	2012–13	16	0	7	0	0	0	23	0
Veria	2013–14	13	0	2	0	0	0	15	0
Platanias	2014–15	20	0	3	0	0	0	23	0
Platanias	2015–16	18	1	5	0	0	0	23	1
Platanias	2016–17	19	1	6	1	0	0	25	2
PAS Giannina	2017–18	13	0	5	0	0	0	18	0
PAS Giannina	2018–19	16	0	5	0	0	0	21	0
PAS Giannina	2019–20	18	1	2	0	0	0	20	1
Career total		171	3	36	1	2	0	209	4

== National statistics ==
Greece U19 national team
Year	Apps	Goals
2009–10	6	0
Total	6	0

Greece U21 national team
Year	Apps	Goals
2010–11	2	0
2011–12	6	0
2012–13	1	0
Total	9	0

Statistics accurate as of 20 July 2013

== Honours ==
PAS Giannina

- Super League Greece 2: 2019–20
