= Mirosław Sznaucner =

Polish footballer (born 1979)

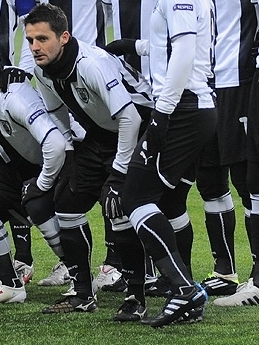
- Sznaucner with PAOK in 2011

Personal information
- Full name: Mirosław Sławomir Sznaucner
- Date of birth: 9 May 1979 (age 47)
- Place of birth: Będzin, Poland
- Height: 1.74 m (5 ft 9 in)
- Position: Defender

Team information
- Current team: APOEL (assistant)

Youth career
- 1996–1998: HKS Szopienice
- 1998–1999: GKS Katowice

Senior career*
Years	Team	Apps	(Gls)
1999–2003	GKS Katowice	79	(1)
2003–2007	Iraklis	95	(0)
2007–2012	PAOK	95	(0)
2012–2013	Veria	11	(0)
Total		290	(1)

International career
1999–2000	Poland U21	9	(0)
2003	Poland	2	(0)

Managerial career
- 2014–2015: PAOK U16
- 2015–2016: PAOK U19 (assistant)
- 2016–2017: PAOK (assistant)
- 2017–2020: PAOK U19 (assistant)
- 2020–2021: PAOK (assistant)
- 2021–2023: PAOK B (assistant)
- 2023–2024: Panserraikos (assistant)
- 2024–2025: Atromitos (assistant)
- 2025–: APOEL (assistant)
- * Club domestic league appearances and goals

Mirosław Sławomir Sznaucner (born 9 May 1979) is a Polish former professional footballer who played as a defender. He is currently the assistant coach of Cypriot club APOEL.

== Club career ==
His playing career began in 1996, at the age of 17, with HKS Szopenice. In 1999, he transferred to GKS Katowice, where he stayed for four years. In 2003, he joined Iraklis, where he played for the next four years. At the end of his contract, in 2007, he then joined PAOK, where he stayed until 2012, making 121 appearances for the club. He usually played as a side back, either on the left or the right, but occasionally was utilized as a center-back: a very valuable player, able to giving solutions when needed.

== International career ==
He featured for the Poland national team twice, unable to break into the line-up regularly.

== Managerial career ==
Sznaucner joined PAOK in 2014 as a coach. He was then called to take over the technical leadership of PAOK's newly formed under-16 side and continued with the under-20s. He was then promoted to the first team, before returning to the under-19s to work alongside Pablo García, with whom they have already celebrated three league titles.

== Personal ==
His eldest son Maksymilian plays for PAOK B, and the younger, Leon, for PAOK Academies.

== Career statistics ==
=== Club ===
Appearances and goals by club, season and competition
Club	Season	League			National cup (Note: Includes Polish Cup, Greek Cup)		Continental		Other		Total	
Club	Season	Division	Apps	Goals	Apps	Goals	Apps	Goals	Apps	Goals	Apps	Goals
GKS Katowice	1999–2000	II liga	10	0	1	0	—		—		11	0
GKS Katowice	2000–01	Ekstraklasa	24	0	1	0	—		2 (Note: Appearances in Polish League Cup)	0	27	0
GKS Katowice	2001–02	Ekstraklasa	28	1	1	0	—		6	0	35	1
GKS Katowice	2002–03	Ekstraklasa	27	0	1	0	—		—		28	0
GKS Katowice	Total		89	1	4	0	—		8	0	101	1
Iraklis	2003–04	Super League Greece	19	0	5	0	—		0	0	24	0
Iraklis	2004–05	Super League Greece	27	0	5	0	—		0	0	32	0
Iraklis	2005–06	Super League Greece	25	0	1	0	—		0	0	26	0
Iraklis	2006–07	Super League Greece	24	0	3	0	2 (Note: Appearances in UEFA Europa League)	0	0	0	29	0
Iraklis	Total		95	0	14	0	2	0	0	0	111	0
PAOK	2007–08	Super League Greece	19	0	0	0	—		0	0	19	0
PAOK	2008–09	Super League Greece	29	0	4	0	—		0	0	33	0
PAOK	2009–10	Super League Greece	14	0	1	0	2	0	0	0	17	0
PAOK	2010–11	Super League Greece	21	0	5	0	9 (Note: Two appearances in UEFA Champions League, seven appearances in UEFA Europa League)	0	0	0	35	0
PAOK	2011–12	Super League Greece	12	0	1	0	4	0	0	0	17	0
PAOK	Total		95	0	11	0	15	0	0	0	121	0
Veria	2012–13	Super League Greece	11	0	3	0	—		0	0	14	0
Career total			290	1	32	0	17	0	8	0	347	1

=== International ===
Appearances and goals by national team and year
National team	Year	Apps	Goals
Poland	2003	2	0
Total		2	0

== Honours ==
PAOK

- Super League Greece runner-up: 2009–10
