= Costin Lazăr =

Romanian footballer

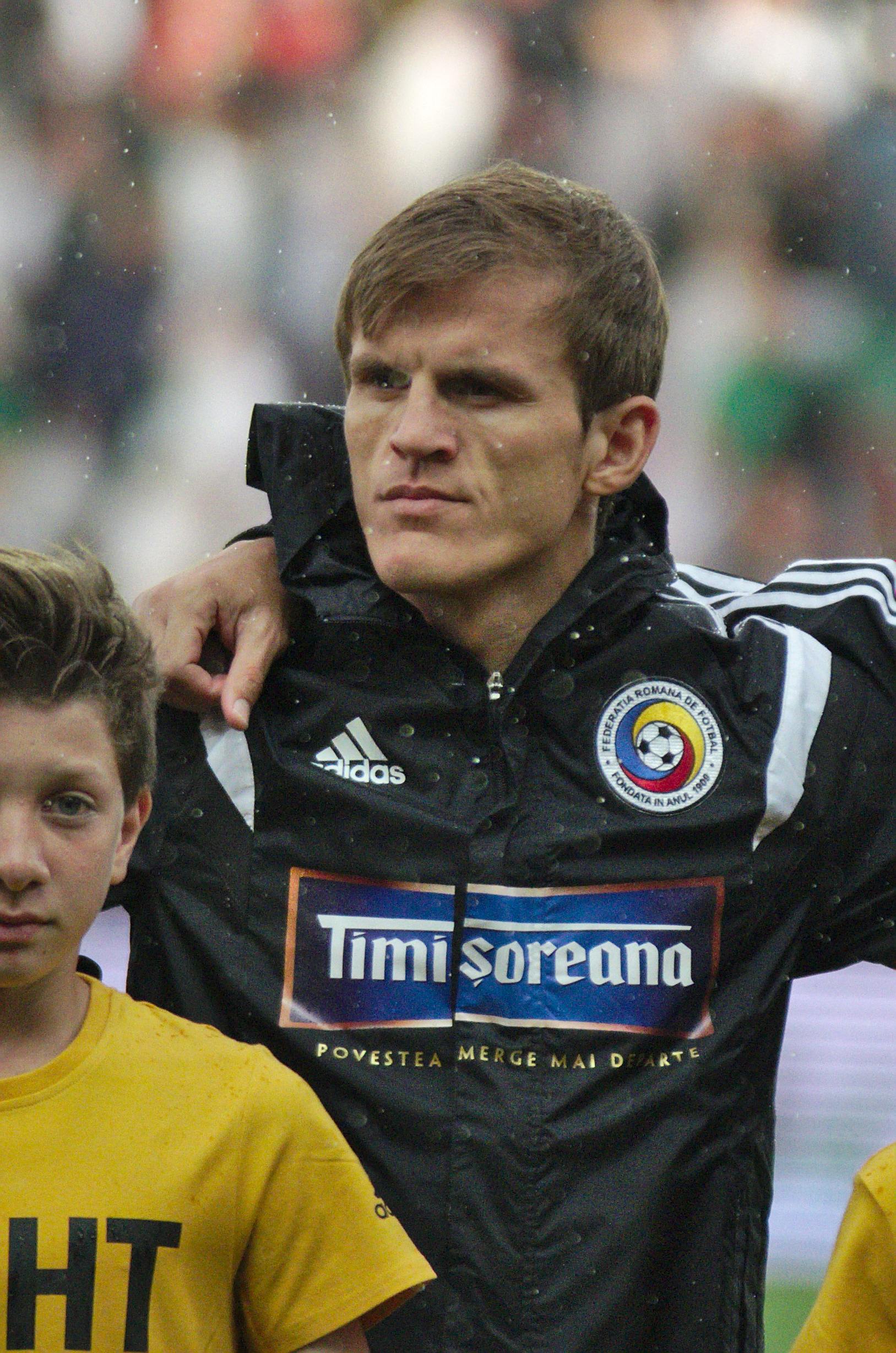
- Lazăr with Romania in 2014

Personal information
- Date of birth: 24 April 1981 (age 45)
- Place of birth: Bucharest, Romania
- Height: 1.79 m (5 ft 10 in)
- Position: Defensive midfielder

Youth career
- 1994–1999: Sportul Studențesc

Senior career*
Years	Team	Apps	(Gls)
1999–2006	Sportul Studențesc	157	(11)
2006–2011	Rapid București	134	(9)
2011–2014	PAOK	80	(7)
2014–2015	Panetolikos	10	(0)
2015–2016	Iraklis	6	(0)
2016–2019	Voluntari	51	(0)
2019–2020	Mostiștea Ulmu	2	(1)
Total		440	(28)

International career
2005–2015	Romania	31	(2)

Managerial career
- 2019–2020: Mostiștea Ulmu (assistant)
- 2021–2023: Cetatea Turnu Măgurele
- 2023: Câmpulung Muscel
- 2024: Gloria Băneasa
- 2024: Câmpulung Muscel
- 2024–: Progresul Fundulea
- * Club domestic league appearances and goals

Costin Lazăr (born 24 April 1981) is a Romanian former professional footballer who played as a defensive midfielder for teams such as Sportul Studențesc, Rapid București, PAOK or FC Voluntari, among others. Lazăr was capped with Romania at senior level, making 32 appearances and scoring twice.

== Club career ==
=== Sportul Studenţesc ===
Until 2006, Lazăr enjoyed a successful spell at Sportul Studenţesc.

=== Rapid București ===
Lazăr joined Rapid București in the summer of 2006. In March 2009, he was involved in an incident in which he was judged to have been fouled in the box by Oţelul's Alexandru Bourceanu. Lazăr, adamant that it was a fair tackle, refused to take the penalty and eventually persuaded the referee to award a drop ball, which his teammate Ovidiu Herea then kicked out for a goal kick.

=== PAOK ===
On 21 July 2011, Lazăr signed a three-year contract with PAOK FC after he was chosen by the club coach László Bölöni. He quickly became a key player for the club even after 5 matches. On 25 March, in a game against Kerkyra, Lazăr scored two goals, to help his team to a 4–0 victory. On 6 January 2013 Costin Lazar scored a wonderful goal for PAOK, winning 4–1 away to Panthrakikos, in a match of the Super League Greece. This goal voted as the best of the week.

=== Panetolikos ===
On 19 January 2015, Lazăr signed a six-month contract with Panetolikos

=== Iraklis ===
On 25 June 2015, Lazar signed an annual contract with Greek Super League club Iraklis.

== Career statistics ==
=== Club ===
Appearances and goals by club, season and competition
Club	Season	League		Cup		Europe		Other		Total	
Club	Season	Apps	Goals	Apps	Goals	Apps	Goals	Apps	Goals	Apps	Goals
Sportul Studenţesc	1999–2000	5	0	0	0	0	0	0	0	5	0
Sportul Studenţesc	2000–01	28	2	4	0	0	0	0	0	32	2
Sportul Studenţesc	2001–02	28	1	2	0	0	0	0	0	30	1
Sportul Studenţesc	2002–03	21	0	1	0	0	0	0	0	22	0
Sportul Studenţesc	2003–04	30	5	1	0	0	0	0	0	31	5
Sportul Studenţesc	2004–05	19	1	4	0	0	0	0	0	23	1
Sportul Studenţesc	2005–06	25	2	0	0	0	0	0	0	25	2
Sportul Studenţesc	2006–07	1	0	2	0	0	0	0	0	3	0
Sportul Studenţesc	Total	157	11	14	0	0	0	0	0	171	11
Rapid București	2006–07	26	2	4	0	6	0	0	0	36	2
Rapid București	2007–08	24	4	1	0	1	1	1	0	27	5
Rapid București	2008–09	30	0	3	1	1	0	0	0	34	1
Rapid București	2009–10	31	2	2	1	0	0	0	0	33	3
Rapid București	2010–11	23	1	2	0	0	0	0	0	25	1
Rapid București	Total	134	9	12	2	8	1	1	0	155	12
PAOK	2011–12	26	3	2	0	10	1	1	0	39	4
PAOK	2012–13	29	2	7	1	3	0	0	0	39	3
PAOK	2013–14	25	2	3	0	11	0	0	0	39	2
PAOK	Total	80	7	12	1	24	1	1	0	117	9
Panetolikos	2014–15	10	0	0	0	0	0	0	0	10	0
Iraklis	2015–16	6	0	0	0	0	0	0	0	6	0
Voluntari	2016–17	20	0	4	0	0	0	0	0	30	0
Voluntari	2017–18	26	0	0	0	0	0	2	1	28	1
Voluntari	2018–19	5	0	0	0	0	0	0	0	5	0
Voluntari	Total	51	0	4	0	0	0	2	1	57	1
Career total		438	27	42	3	32	2	4	1	516	33

=== International ===
#	Date	Opponent	Score	Result	Competition
1	11 September 2012	Andorra	2–0	4–0	2014 FIFA World Cup qualification
2	11 October 2013	Andorra	4–0	4–0	2014 FIFA World Cup qualification

== Honours ==
Sportul Studenţesc

- Romanian Second League: 2000–01, 2003–04

Rapid București

- Romanian Cup: 2006–07
- Romanian Supercup: 2007

Voluntari

- Romanian Cup: 2016–17
- Romanian Supercup: 2017
