= Bertrand Robert =

French footballer (born 1983)

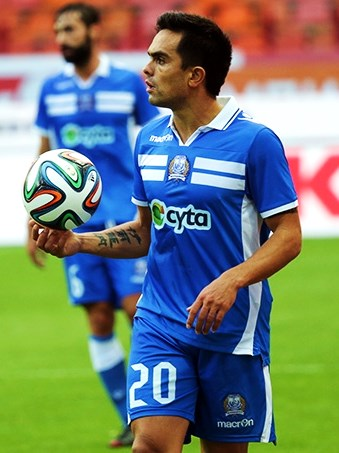

Personal information
- Full name: Bertrand Robert
- Date of birth: 16 November 1983 (age 42)
- Place of birth: Saint-Benoît, Réunion
- Height: 1.74 m (5 ft 9 in)
- Positions: Left winger; left back

Team information
- Current team: Elpis Sapon

Youth career
- Montpellier

Senior career*
Years	Team	Apps	(Gls)
2001–2004	Montpellier	50	(3)
2004–2007	Guingamp	96	(8)
2007–2009	FC Lorient	11	(2)
2008	→ AC Ajaccio (loan)	13	(0)
2009–2011	Panthrakikos	54	(14)
2011–2013	PAOK	33	(2)
2013–2015	Apollon Limassol	49	(1)
2015–2016	AEL Limassol	30	(0)
2016	Panthrakikos	4	(0)
2017	Trikala	16	(1)
2017–2018	Kavala	0	(0)
2018	Megas Alexandros Iasmou		
2019–2020	AS Excelsior		
2020–	Panthrakikos		
2021–	→ Elpis Sapon (loan)		
- * Club domestic league appearances and goals as of 29 October 2017

Bertrand Robert (born 16 November 1983) is a French footballer who plays as a defender for AS Excelsior. He is the younger brother of Laurent Robert.

== Career ==
Retiring in the summer 2018, one year later it was announced that Robert had come out of retirement to return the Réunion Island and play for AS Excelsior.

=== Career statistics ===
As of 4 October 2012

Appearances and goals by club, season and competition
Club	Season	League			Cup		Continental		Total	
Club	Season	Division	Apps	Goals	Apps	Goals	Apps	Goals	Apps	Goals
Montpellier	2001–02	Ligue 1	3	0	0	0	0	0	3	0
Montpellier	2002–03	Ligue 1	26	3	0	0	0	0	26	3
Montpellier	2003–04	Ligue 1	21	0	0	0	0	0	21	0
Guingamp	2004–05	Ligue 2	35	5	0	0	0	0	35	5
Guingamp	2005–06	Ligue 2	32	1	0	0	0	0	32	1
Guingamp	2006–07	Ligue 2	29	2	0	0	0	0	29	2
Lorient	2007-08	Ligue 1	5	0	0	0	0	0	5	0
AC Ajaccio	2007–08	Ligue 2	13	0	0	0	0	0	13	0
Lorient	2008–09	Ligue 1	5	2	1	0	0	0	6	2
Panthrakikos	2009–10	Super League	25	4	1	0	0	0	26	4
Panthrakikos	2010–11	Football League	28	8	1	0	0	0	29	8
PAOK	2011-12	Super League	10	0	2	0	3	0	15	0
PAOK	2012-13	Super League	22	2	0	0	4	1	26	3
Career total			232	25	5	0	7	1	244	26
