= Georgios Fotakis =

Greek footballer

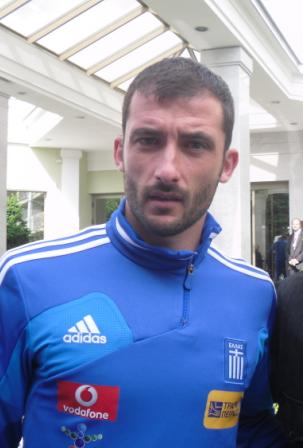

Personal information
- Full name: Georgios Fotakis
- Date of birth: 29 October 1981 (age 45)
- Place of birth: Kalamata, Greece
- Height: 1.77 m (5 ft 9 1/2 in)
- Position: Midfielder

Youth career
- –1999: Omonoia Kalamatas

Senior career*
Years	Team	Apps	(Gls)
1999–2000	PAOK	0	(0)
2000	→ Kallithea (loan)	8	(0)
2000–2006	Egaleo	138	(12)
2006	Kilmarnock	0	(0)
2006–2009	AEL	70	(7)
2009–2013	PAOK	104	(7)
2013–2014	Şanlıurfaspor	9	(0)
2014	Atromitos	8	(0)
2014–2015	Panetolikos	26	(1)
2016	Panthrakikos	1	(0)
2016–2018	Panachaiki	26	(4)

International career^{‡}
2000–2002	Greece U19	14	(1)
2004	Greece U20	3	(0)
2004	Greece Olympic	3	(0)
2009–2012	Greece	13	(2)
- * Club domestic league appearances and goals as of 20 May 2018 ‡ National team caps and goals as of 18 August 2013

Georgios Fotakis (Greek: Γεώργιος Φωτάκης; born 29 October 1981) is a Greek former professional footballer who played as a midfielder.

He last played for Panachaiki.

== Club career ==
Fotakis spent his early career in his native Greece, playing for PAOK, Kallithea and Egaleo. He moved to Scotland in January 2006 to sign for Kilmarnock, but he never made a league appearance for them. He then returned to Greece in 2006 with AEL, before moving to PAOK in the summer of 2009. He played with PAOK for four consecutive years, before he moved for a 1+1 year contract to Şanlıurfaspor. At 31 January 2014 he signed with Atromitos a one-and-a-half-year contract. On 27 May 2014 Atromitos announced the end of cooperation with Fotakis. On 31 August 2015 Fotakis signed with Panetolikos for a year contract. On 25 June 2015, Fotakis made an oral agreement with the Greek club Veria, but never signed a contract and remained without a team in the first round of the season. On 5 February 2016, Super League Greece club Panthrakikos officially announced the signing of Fotakis until the end of the season. On 8 August 2016, Fotakis has signed a contract with Gamma Ethniki club Panachaiki.

== International career ==
Fotakis has played for the Greek under-21 side, and also made three appearances in the 2004 Summer Olympics.

Fotakis made his international debut for the Greek senior team in 2009.

== Honours ==
AEL

- Greek Cup: 2006–07
