= Toumba =

Type of archaeological site

In archaeology the term Toumba (Greek: Τούμπα) or Magoula (Greek: Μαγούλα) in Thessaly is a Greek word which describes mounds created by Bronze and early Iron Age settlements in northern Greece. At first they were considered as grave mounds but excavations since the early 1900s showed that most were the remains of settlements built up century after century from the collapse and rebuilding of timber-framed mudbrick structures. They correspond to the Tell sites found in the Near East.

For example, a Toumba near Assiros in Greek Central Macedonia was occupied from 2000 BC to 900 BC. Here the earliest levels explored included a series of granaries containing one of the largest accumulations of charred crops from Prehistoric Europe. Later levels revealed many aspects of domestic life at the period including storage jars, cooking hearths, pottery and weights from upright looms. A single burial had been inserted during a short period of abandonment. Similarly, Toumbas in other parts of Macedonia have been found to contain fragments of processed cereal grains. These have been dated to 2100-1900 BC.

== See also ==
- Tell
