= Dimitrios Popović =

Greek footballer

Dimitrios Popovits
Personal information
- Full name: Greek: Δημήτριος Πόποβιτς; Serbian: Димитрис Поповић
- Birth name: Dimitrios Popović
- Date of birth: 11 February 1995 (age 31)
- Place of birth: Frankfurt am Main, Germany
- Height: 1.68 m (5 ft 6 in)
- Position: Winger

Team information
- Current team: Kavala

Youth career
- 2004–2009: Panserraikos
- 2009–2012: PAOK

Senior career*
Years	Team	Apps	(Gls)
2012–2016	PAOK	3	(0)
2013–2014	→ Platanias (loan)	9	(0)
2014	→ Apollon Kalamarias (loan)	12	(4)
2014–2015	→ Aiginiakos (loan)	14	(0)
2015–2016	→ Panserraikos (loan)	11	(0)
2016	→ Karmiotissa (loan)	10	(5)
2016–2017	Waldhof Mannheim	12	(0)
2017–2018	TuS Koblenz	35	(5)
2018–2019	Viktoria Köln	6	(1)
2019–2022	Zemplín Michalovce	72	(4)
2022–2023	Almopos Aridea	9	(0)
2023–2024	Motorlet Prague	2	(0)
2024–	Kavala	15	(0)

International career^{‡}
2011–2012	Greece U17	4	(0)
2013	Greece U18	5	(1)
2013	Greece U19	4	(1)
2014	Greece U20	1	(0)
- * Club domestic league appearances and goals as of 15 June 2025 ‡ National team caps and goals as of 1 August 2019

Dimitrios Popović (born 11 February 1995) is a Greek professional footballer who plays as a winger for Super League 2 club Kavala.

== Personal life ==
Born in Frankfurt am Main, Germany, Popović is of partial Serbian and Greek descent.

== Club career ==
Popović started his career in Serres with Panserraikos, before signed 2009 for PAOK in Thessaloniki. He played his debut in the Football League on 21 January 2012 for PAOK against Panionios. Popović played three games for PAOK, before left the club to join Platanias on loan in August 2013. By Platanias played nine games and returned in December 2013 to PAOK, which loaned him against out, now to Apollon Kalamarias. On 20 August 2015, he signed a year contract with Panserraikos as a loan from PAOK, but he didn't finish the year with the club as he signed with Cypriot club Karmiotissa. On 8 July 2016, he signed a three years' contract with Regionalliga Südwest club Waldhof Mannheim for an undisclosed fee, while PAOK kept a 30% of his next transfer value. On 28 January 2017, he signed with Regionalliga Südwest club Koblenz as a free transfer till 30 June 2018. In July 2019, he signed with Fortuna Liga club Zemplín Michalovce.

== International career ==
The left winger is part of the Greece national under-20 football team and was previously part of the U17, U18 and U20.
