= Lino (footballer, born 1977) =

Brazilian footballer

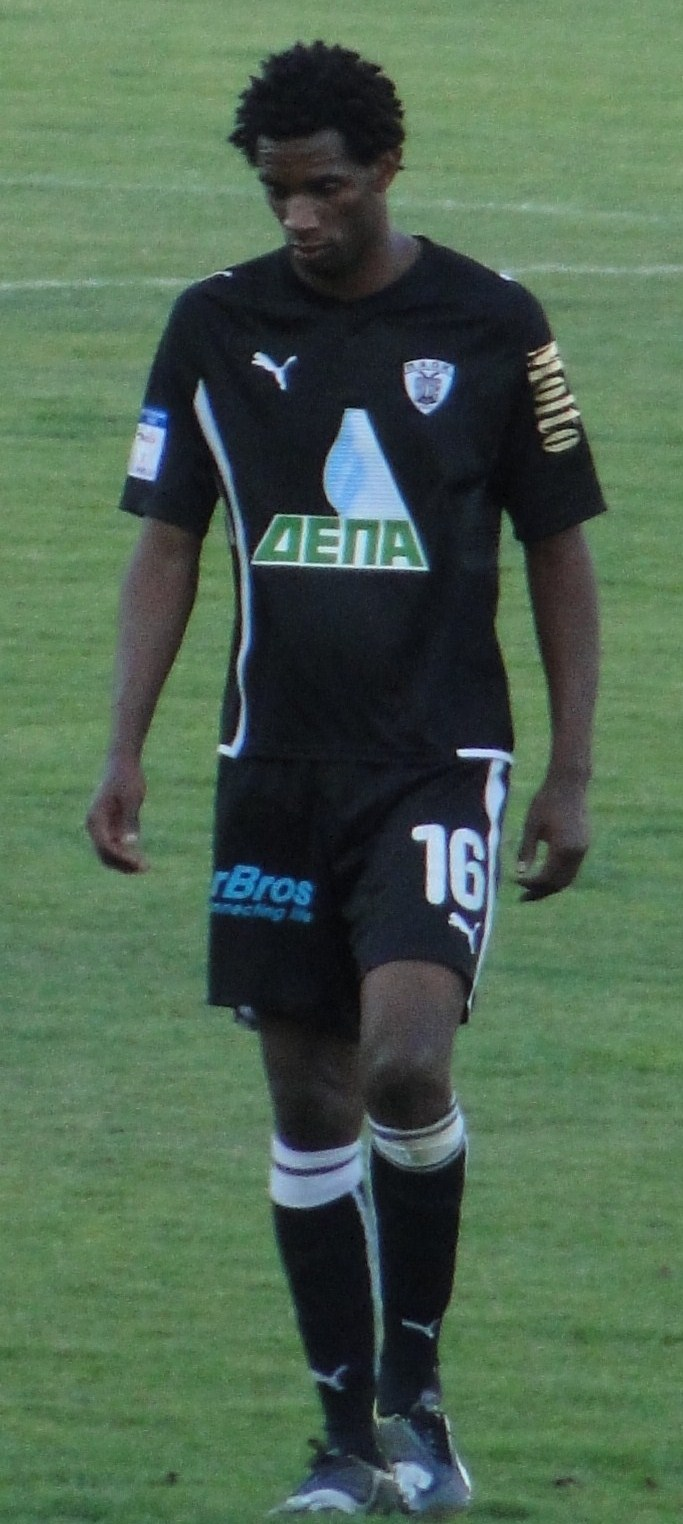
- Lino playing for PAOK in 2010

Personal information
- Full name: Dorvalino Alves Maciel
- Date of birth: 1 June 1977 (age 49)
- Place of birth: São Paulo, Brazil
- Height: 1.84 m (6 ft 0 in)
- Position: Left back

Youth career
- 1997–1998: Corinthians

Senior career*
Years	Team	Apps	(Gls)
1999	São Caetano	11	(0)
2000	Mauaense	?	(?)
2001	Iraty	?	(?)
2001–2005	São Paulo	23	(1)
2002	→ Figueirense (loan)	19	(1)
2003	→ Bahia (loan)	32	(5)
2005	→ Fluminense (loan)	19	(1)
2006	Marília	12	(0)
2006	Juventude	9	(2)
2006–2007	Académica	29	(5)
2007–2008	Porto	11	(0)
2008–2014	PAOK	161	(11)
2014	Académica	4	(0)
2015	Londrina	0	(0)
Total		330	(26)
- * Club domestic league appearances and goals

Dorvalino Alves Maciel (born 1 June 1977), known as Lino, is a Brazilian former footballer who played as a left back.

== Club career ==
=== Early years / Portugal ===
Born in São Paulo, Lino represented several clubs in his country's Série A. In 2003 he scored five goals for Esporte Clube Bahia, but his team ranked dead last.

In 2006, Lino moved to Portugal, signing for Académica de Coimbra. He only missed one game in his first and only season, but the side only narrowly avoided relegation. He subsequently joined fellow league club FC Porto, appearing rarely during his spell but scoring in a 3–1 home win against Fenerbahçe S.K. for the campaign's UEFA Champions League.

=== PAOK ===
In the 2009 January transfer window, Lino signed for PAOK in the Super League Greece. He was selected team MVP in 2013–14, surpassing Stefanos Athanasiadis and Miroslav Stoch. PAOK signed him from Porto at age 32. From January 2009 to July 2014 he was first-team regular and left his mark on the club, earning his place as one of the best foreign players to wear a PAOK shirt. He played 220 times, scoring 16 goals, while also contributing 41 assists – making his performances a benchmark for those who followed him.

== Career statistics ==
=== Club ===
As of 24 February 2021

Club	Season	League			Cup		Continental		Other		Total	
Club	Season	Division	Apps	Goals	Apps	Goals	Apps	Goals	Apps	Goals	Apps	Goals
São Caetano	1999	Série B	11	0	0	0	0	0	0	0	11	0
Mauaense	2000	Série B1	0	0	0	0	0	0	0	0	0	0
Iraty	2001	Série C	0	0	0	0	0	0	0	0	0	0
Iraty	Total		11	0	0	0	0	0	0	0	11	0
São Paulo	2001	Série A	10	0	0	0	0	0	0	0	10	0
São Paulo	2004	Série A	13	1	0	0	0	0	0	0	14	0
Figueirense (loan)	2002	Série A	19	1	0	0	0	0	0	0	20	0
Bahia (loan)	2003	Série A	32	5	0	0	0	0	0	0	32	5
Fluminense (loan)	2005	Série A	19	1	0	0	2	0	0	0	21	1
Fluminense (loan)	Total		93	8	0	0	2	0	0	0	95	8
Marília	2006	Série B	12	0	0	0	0	0	0	0	12	0
Juventude	2006	Série A	9	2	0	0	0	0	0	0	9	2
Juventude	Total		21	2	0	0	0	0	0	0	21	2
Académica	2006–07	Primeira Liga	29	5	0	0	0	0	0	0	29	5
Porto	2007–08	Primeira Liga	6	0	1	0	0	0	0	0	7	0
Porto	2008–09	Primeira Liga	5	0	1	0	3	1	0	0	9	1
Porto	Total		40	5	2	0	3	1	0	0	45	6
PAOK	2008–09	Super League Greece	18	0	3	0	0	0	0	0	21	0
PAOK	2009–10	Super League Greece	32	3	3	1	4	1	0	0	39	5
PAOK	2010–11	Super League Greece	24	2	4	0	5	0	0	0	33	2
PAOK	2011–12	Super League Greece	28	3	3	2	11	1	0	0	32	6
PAOK	2012–13	Super League Greece	33	2	5	0	4	0	0	0	42	2
PAOK	2013–14	Super League Greece	26	1	6	0	10	0	0	0	42	1
PAOK	Total		161	11	24	3	34	2	0	0	219	16
Académica	2014–15	Primeira Liga	4	0	1	0	0	0	0	0	5	0
Londrina	2015	Série C	0	0	0	0	0	0	0	0	0	0
Londrina	Total		4	0	1	0	0	0	0	0	5	0
Career total			330	26	27	3	39	3	0	0	396	32

== Honours ==
Porto

- Primeira Liga: 2007–08

=== Individual ===
- PAOK MVP of the Season: 2012–13, 2013–14
- Super League Greece Team of the Year: 2011–12
