= Asterios Giakoumis =

Greek footballer

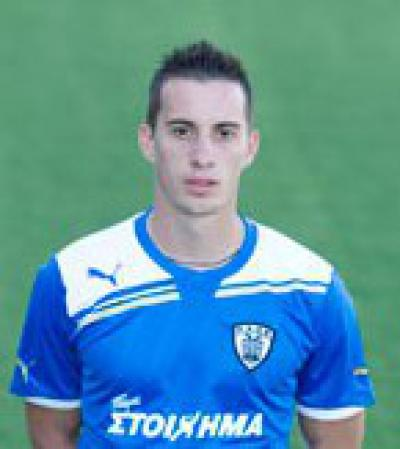

Personal information
- Full name: Asterios Giakoumis
- Date of birth: 3 May 1988 (age 38)
- Place of birth: Kymina, Thessaloniki, Greece
- Height: 1.87 m (6 ft 1 1/2 in)
- Position: Goalkeeper

Team information
- Current team: Agrotikos Asteras

Senior career*
Years	Team	Apps	(Gls)
2008–2010	Agrotikos Asteras	28	(0)
2010–2015	PAOK	1	(0)
2011–2012	→ Agrotikos Asteras (loan)	20	(0)
2015–2017	Agrotikos Asteras	40	(0)
2017–2018	Sparta	15	(0)
2018–2019	Olympiacos Volos	0	(0)
2019–2021	Trikala	36	(0)
2021–2022	Xanthi	4	(0)
2022–2026	Kampaniakos	50	(0)
2026–	Agrotikos Asteras		

International career^{‡}
2009–2010	Greece U21	4	(0)
- * Club domestic league appearances and goals as of 26 April 2026 ‡ National team caps and goals as of 26 January 2011

Asterios Giakoumis (Greek: Αστέριος Γιακουμής; born 3 May 1988) is a Greek professional footballer who plays as a goalkeeper for Agrotikos Asteras.

== Career ==
Born in Kymina, Thessaloniki, Giakoumis played for PAOK. He moved from Agrotikos Asteras in August 2010. He was voted best goalkeeper of the Football League for the season 2009/2010. He was also member of Greece U21. On 31 August 2012, Giakoumis was loaned back to Agrotikos Asteras for the rest of the season.
