= Georgios Katsikas =

Greek footballer (born 1990)

Personal information
- Date of birth: 14 June 1990 (age 36)
- Place of birth: Thessaloniki, Greece
- Height: 1.87 m (6 ft 1 1/2 in)
- Position: Centre-back

Team information
- Current team: Keravnos Kolchiko (manager)

Youth career
- 1998–2008: Iraklis

Senior career*
Years	Team	Apps	(Gls)
2008–2011	Iraklis	14	(0)
2008–2009	→ Olympiacos Volos (loan)	19	(1)
2011–2015	PAOK	40	(4)
2015–2016	Twente	7	(0)
2016	→ Jong Twente	4	(1)
2017	Esbjerg	10	(1)
2017–2018	Dinamo București	41	(3)
2019–2020	Dinamo Brest	6	(0)
2021–2022	Lokomotiv Sofia	27	(0)
2022–2023	Nea Salamis Famagusta	19	(0)
2023	Levadiakos	0	(0)
2023–2024	Nea Salamis Famagusta	4	(0)
2025–2026	Doxa Assiros		

International career
2008–2009	Greece U19	4	(0)
2010–2012	Greece U21	5	(0)

Managerial career
- 2026–: Keravnos Kolchiko
- * Club domestic league appearances and goals as of 21 May 2024

Georgios Katsikas (Greek: Γεώργιος Κατσικάς; born 14 June 1990) is a Greek former professional footballer who played as a centre-back.

== Club career ==
=== Iraklis ===
Katsikas started his career in the youth ranks of Iraklis. He was brought there, when he was eight years old, by his father, a former player of Iraklis.

In the summer of 2008 he was loaned out to Olympiacos Volos, then playing in Beta Ethniki, to gain first team experience. He debuted for Olympiakos Volos in the opening game of the 2008-09 season, a 0–0 away draw against Pierikos. He even managed to score for Olympiakos Volos, to help the club grab a 1–1 home draw against Veria. Until the end of the season he totally featured in 19 matches not managing to score any other goals. After his loan spell in Volos Katsikas returned to Iraklis for the 2009-10 season. He could not break into the starting lineup, but nevertheless he made his debut for Iraklis in a cup against Gamma Ethniki side Trikala. Katsikas was sent off in his debut and eventually Iraklis got eliminated by the Cup after losing the contest by a 1–0 scoreline. In that season he also made his league debut for Iraklis, as he came in for teammate Achilleas Sarakatsanos in the 84th minute, in a 2–0 away defeat from Panathinaikos. In his second season for Iraklis Katsikas featured regularly in the playing squad of the club, playing in 13 of the club's league matches until February. On 9 February 2011 Katsikas suffered a torn cruciate ligament, in a friendly match of Greece U-21, and lost the remainder of the season.

=== PAOK ===
On 14 October 2011 Katsikas signed a four years contract with PAOK, after he was released from Iraklis. On 4 January 2012 he made his debut for the club in 3–1 home win against Levadiakos. He scored his first goal for PAOK against Rapid Wien in August 2012, while his first league goal came into the local derby between PAOK and Aris in a 4–1 win for PAOK. On 3 April 2015 George Katsikas along with Theofanis Tzandaris have solved their contracts with PAOK, receiving his payment until the end of the season.

=== Twente ===
On 2 July 2015, Katsikas signed a year contract with the Dutch club Twente for an undisclosed fee. Twente coach Alfred Schreuder was pleased with this transfer as he could build on Katsikas' experience. On 9 September 2015 in the training, Katsikas has suffered a cruciate ligament rupture and he is going to undergo a surgery which makes him miss the remainder of the season. The Greek centre back is expected to stay on the sidelines for six to nine months missing potentially the start of Twente's pre-season over the summer 2016. On 21 August, Katsikas made his comeback in the awaygame against FC Groningen.

=== Esbjerg fB ===
Katsikas joined for Danish Superliga-side Esbjerg fB on 23 January 2017.

=== Dinamo București ===
On 28 June 2017, the European adventure continues for the Greek centre back, after Dinamo București announced his acquisition for the next two years for an undisclosed fee. The 27-year-old centre back is a personal choice of the Romanian team's coach, Cosmin Contra, who sees a remarkable addition for his club. Dinamo București ended in third place in the 2016-17 Romanian Championship, behind FC Viitorul Constanța and FC Steaua București, taking the Europa League ticket. On 16 October 2017, he scored a brace in a 3–0 home win game against SC Juventus București. On 11 December 2017, he scored the second goal sealing a 2–0 home win game against FC Voluntari.

=== Dinamo Brest ===
On 12 February 2019, he signed a two years contract with Dinamo Brest for an undisclosed fee.

=== Lokomotiv Sofia ===
On 17 July 2021, The 31-year-old defender signed a year contract with Lokomotiv Sofia. Katsikas is destined to be a key player for the club, as after his presentation, the coach Ivan Kolev, stated that he intended to be among the starting XI against Beroe.

== International career ==
He was a member of the Greek U-21 team that participated in the 2009 Mediterranean Games and he played in the matches against Syria, Italy and Turkey.
