= 2010–11 PAOK FC season =

PAOK
2010–11 season
- Chairman: Theodoros Zagorakis
- Manager: Makis Chavos
- Stadium: Toumba Stadium
- Super League: 3rd (4th in regular season)
- Greek Cup: Semi-finals
- Champions League: Third qualifying round
- Europa League: Round of 32
- Top goalscorer: League: Dimitris Salpingidis (6); All: Dimitris Salpingidis (12)
Home colours	Away colours	Third colours

The 2010–11 season was PAOK Football Club's 85th in existence and the club's 52nd consecutive season in the top flight of Greek football. The team entered the Greek Football Cup and also competed in the UEFA Champions League starting from the third qualifying round.

== Players ==
Note: Flags indicate national team as defined under FIFA eligibility rules; some limited exceptions apply. Players may hold more than one non-FIFA nationality.

No.	Pos.	Nation	Player
1	GK	GRE	Kostas Chalkias
4	MF	GRE	Sotiris Balafas
5	MF	URU	Pablo Garcia
6	MF	ESP	Victor Vitolo
7	MF	MAR	Nabil El Zhar
8	DF	ITA	Bruno Cirillo
9	FW	GRE	Dimitris Salpingidis
11	FW	BIH	Zlatan Muslimovic
13	DF	GRE	Stelios Malezas
14	FW	GRE	Athanasios Papazoglou
15	DF	CHI	Pablo Contreras
16	DF	BRA	Alves Lino
18	MF	GRE	Giorgos Fotakis
19	MF	GRE	Vasilios Koutsianikoulis

No.	Pos.	Nation	Player
20	MF	POR	Vieirinha
21	MF	SRB	Vladimir Ivić
22	GK	GRE	Asterios Giakoumis
23	DF	GRE	Lefteris Sakellariou
27	DF	POL	Mirosław Sznaucner
28	MF	GRE	Stavros Tsoukalas
30	GK	GRE	Fotis Koutzavasilis
31	FW	ARG	Lucio Filomeno
33	FW	GRE	Stefanos Athanasiadis
36	DF	ITA	Mirko Savini
37	DF	GRE	Vangelis Georgiou
77	DF	BRA	Etto
85	MF	COL	Diego Arias
91	GK	CRO	Dario Krešić

'For recent transfers, see List of Greek football transfers summer 2010'

=== Out on loan ===
Note: Flags indicate national team as defined under FIFA eligibility rules; some limited exceptions apply. Players may hold more than one non-FIFA nationality.

No.	Pos.	Nation	Player
—	MF	GHA	Mohammed Abubakari (on loan to Panseraikos)
—	MF	GRE	Hussein Mumin (on loan to Panetolikos)
—	GK	GRE	Panagiotis Glykos (on loan to Agrotikos Asteras F.C.)
—	DF	GRE	Aristotelis Karasalidis (on loan to Anagennisi Giannitsa F.C.)
—	MF	GRE	Grigoris Efthimiadis (on loan to Anagennisi Giannitsa F.C.)
—	DF	GRE	Panagiotis Kourdakis (on loan to Anagennisi Epanomi F.C.)

No.	Pos.	Nation	Player
—	MF	GRE	Nikos Astaris (on loan to Anagennisi Epanomi F.C.)
—	MF	GRE	Giorgos Paralikis (on loan to Anagennisi Epanomi F.C.)
—	DF	GRE	Aleksandros Apostolopoulos (on loan to APS Zakynthos)
—	MF	GRE	Paliouras Konstantinos (on loan to APS Zakynthos)
—	MF	GRE	Nikos Astaris (on loan to Makedonikos F.C.)

=== International players ===
- (Greece) Kostas Chalkias
- (Greece) Dimitris Salpingidis
- (Greece) Stelios Malezas
- (Greece) Vasilios Koutsianikoulis
- (Greece) Giorgos Fotakis
- (Tunisia) Anis Boussaidi
- (Bosnia and Herzegovina) Zlatan Muslimovic
- (Chile) Pablo Contreras
- (Angola) Francisco Zuela
- (Portugal) Vieirinha
- (Morocco) Nabil El Zhar

=== Players in and out ===
==== In ====
No.	Pos.	Nat.	Name	Age	EU	Moving from	Type	Transfer window	Ends	Transfer fee	Source
9	FW	(Greece)	Dimitris Salpingidis	28	EU	Panathinaikos	Transfer	Summer	2014	Free	
42	DF	(Angola)	Francisco Zuela	26		Alania Vladikavkaz (Russia)	Loan	Summer	2011	Free	
3	DF	(Tunisia)	Anis Boussaidi	29		Red Bull Salzburg (Austria)	Transfer	Summer	2011	Free	
7	FW	(Morocco)	Nabil El Zhar	23	EU	Liverpool (England)	Loan	Summer	2011	On Loan	
77	FW	(Brazil)	Etto	23	EU	Dinamo Zagreb (Croatia)	Transfer	Summer	2011	On Loan	
85	FW	(Colombia)	Diego Arias	23	EU	Once Caldas (Colombia)	Transfer	Summer	2011	On Loan	

Total spending: ▼0

== Competitions ==
=== Overview ===
Competition	Record							
Competition	Pld	W	D	L	GF	GA	GD	Win %
Super League Greece	30	14	6	10	32	29	+3	46.67
Greek Cup	6	3	2	1	5	3	+2	50.00
UEFA Europa League	10	4	4	2	8	6	+2	40.00
UEFA play-offs	6	4	0	2	11	8	+3	66.67
UEFA Champions League	2	0	2	0	4	4	+0	0.00
Total	54	25	14	15	60	50	+10	46.30

Last updated: 9 June 2014.
Source: Competitions

=== Managerial statistics ===
Head coach	From	To	Record							
Head coach	From	To	G	W	D	L	GF	GA	GD	Win %
(Greece) Pavlos Dermitzakis	Start Season	17.10.2010	12	3	6	3	12	12	+0	25.00
(Greece) Makis Chavos	18.10.2010	25.05.2011	42	22	8	12	48	38	+10	52.38

== Super League Greece ==
=== League table ===
Pos	Team	Pld	W	D	L	GF	GA	GD	Pts	Qualification or relegation
2	Panathinaikos	30	18	6	6	47	26	+21	60	Qualification for the Play-offs
3	AEK Athens	30	15	5	10	46	37	+9	50	Qualification for the Play-offs
4	PAOK	30	14	6	10	32	29	+3	48	Qualification for the Play-offs
5	Olympiacos Volos (Note: On 28 July 2011, the Disciplinary Committee of the competition found Olympiacos Volos and Kavala guilty of match-fixing. Therefore the clubs were automatically put at the end of the league table and demoted to the Football League. The decision, however, was lifted on 10 August 2011 after both appealed. Instead of that Olympiacos Volos had 10 points deducted and Kavala 8 for the 2011-2012 season. On 23 August 2011, the Professional Sports Committee stripped Kavala and Olympiacos Volos of their professional licence, due to their chairmen's involvement in the match fixing scandal.) (D)	30	12	11	7	40	28	+12	47	Play-offs and relegation to the Delta Ethniki
6	Aris	30	13	6	11	29	29	0	45	

Source: Super League Greece
Rules for classification: 1) Points; 2) Head-to-head points; 3) Head-to-head goal difference; 4) Play-offs (neutral ground); 7) Draw.
(Note: Criterion 4 is only used if needed to decide champion, teams for relegation or teams for UEFA competitions).
(D) Disqualified

=== Results summary ===
Overall								Home						Away					
Pld	W	D	L	GF	GA	GD	Pts	W	D	L	GF	GA	GD	W	D	L	GF	GA	GD
30	14	6	10	32	29	+3	48	10	1	4	20	12	+8	4	5	6	12	17	−5

Last updated: 19 February 2017.
Source: Competitive matches

=== Results by round ===
Round	1	2	3	4	5	6	7	8	9	10	11	12	13	14	15	16	17	18	19	20	21	22	23	24	25	26	27	28	29	30
Ground	H	A	H	A	H	A	H	A	A	H	A	H	A	H	A	A	H	A	H	A	H	A	H	A	H	H	A	H	A	H
Result	W	D	D	L	L	L	W	W	W	W	L	L	W	W	L	D	W	W	W	D	L	L	L	L	W	W	D	W	D	W
Position	1	1	4	11	12	13	10	8	4	3	4	5	3	3	3	3	3	3	3	3	3	3	3	3	6	4	4	4	4	4

Source: League matches
A = Away; H = Home; W = Win; D = Draw; L = Loss

=== Matches ===
Win Draw Loss

29 August 2010 1	PAOK	3–2	Panserraikos	Thessaloniki
18:15 EET	Vieirinha 45+1'; Bruno Cirillo 47'; Papazoglou 70' Manager: (Greece) Pavlos Dermitzakis	Report	19', 56' Nikola Beljić Manager: (Serbia) Dragan Kokotović	Stadium: Toumba Stadium; Attendance: 16,113; Referee: Andreas Pappas

11 September 2010 2	Asteras Tripoli	0–0	PAOK	Tripoli
17:15 EET	Manager: (Greece) Vangelis Vlachos	Report	Manager: (Greece) Pavlos Dermitzakis	Stadium: Theodoros Kolokotronis Stadium; Attendance: 2,367; Referee: Michalis Tsiniaris

19 September 2010 3	PAOK	1–1	Olympiacos Volos	Thessaloniki
18:15 EET	Vladimir Ivić 37' Manager: (Greece) Pavlos Dermitzakis	Report	22' Juan Martín Manager: (Greece) Sakis Tsiolis	Stadium: Toumba Stadium; Attendance: 14,256; Referee: Christos Mhtsios

26 September 2010 4	Xanthi	1–0	PAOK	Xanthi
18:15 EET	Mauro Poy 25' (pen.) Manager: (Greece) Georgios Paraschos	Report	Manager: (Greece) Pavlos Dermitzakis	Stadium: Xanthi FC Arena; Attendance: 3322; Referee: Anastasios Sidiropoulos

3 October 2010 5	PAOK	0–1	Aris	Thessaloniki
20:30 EET	Manager: (Greece) Pavlos Dermitzakis	Report	75' Javito Manager: (Argentina) Héctor Cúper	Stadium: Toumba Stadium; Attendance: 20,084; Referee: Michalis Tsiniaris

16 October 2010 6	Panathinaikos	1–0	PAOK	Athens
19:30 EET	Loukas Vyntra 20' Manager: (Greece) Nikos Nioplias	Report	Manager: (Greece) Pavlos Dermitzakis	Stadium: Olympic Stadium; Attendance: Cl. doors Referee: Stavros Tritsonis

24 October 2010 7	PAOK	3–1	Panionios	Thessaloniki
18:15 EET	Zlatan Muslimovic 8'; Dimitris Salpingidis 11'; Giorgos Fotakis 35' Manager: (Greece) Makis Chavos	Report	77' Giannis Maniatis Manager: (Sweden) Mikael Stahre	Stadium: Toumba Stadium; Attendance: Cl. doors Referee: Athanasios Giachos

31 October 2010 8	Ergotelis	1–2	PAOK	Heraklion
17:15 EET	Mario Budimir 16' Manager: (Greece) Nikos Karageorgiou	Report	30' Dimitris Salpingidis; 90+4' Pablo Contreras Manager: (Greece) Makis Chavos	Stadium: Pankritio Stadium; Attendance: 1273; Referee: Stavros Mandalos

8 November 2010 9	Kavala	0–1	PAOK	Kavala
17:15 EET	Manager: (Serbia) Dragan Okuka	Report	13' Pablo García Manager: (Greece) Makis Chavos	Stadium: Anthi Karagianni Stadium; Attendance: 2169; Referee: Andreas Pappas

13 November 2010 10	PAOK	2–1	AEK Athens	Thessaloniki
19:30 EET	Giorgos Fotakis 45+1'; Vieirinha 90+3' Manager: (Greece) Makis Chavos	Report	69' (pen.) Leonardo Manager: (Spain) Manuel Jiménez	Stadium: Toumba Stadium; Attendance: 18,453; Referee: Anastasios Kakos

21 November 2010 11	Olympiacos	3–0	PAOK	Piraeus
19:30 EET	Kevin Mirallas 37', 72'; Dennis Rommedahl 87' Manager: (Spain) Ernesto Valverde	Report	Manager: (Greece) Makis Chavos	Stadium: Karaiskakis Stadium; Attendance: 30,275; Referee: Vasilios Pamporidis

28 November 2010 12	PAOK	0–1	Atromitos	Thessaloniki
17:15 EET	Manager: (Greece) Makis Chavos	Report	57' Stelios Sfakianakis Manager: (Greece) Georgios Donis	Stadium: Toumba Stadium; Attendance: 13,157; Referee: Stavros Mandalos

5 December 2010 13	AEL	1–2	PAOK	Larissa
17:15 EET	Daniel Cousin 18' Manager: (Greece) Kostas Katsaras	Report	11' Pablo Contreras; 72' Stefanos Athanasiadis Manager: (Greece) Makis Chavos	Stadium: AEL FC Arena; Attendance: 12,829; Referee: Anastasios Sidiropoulos

11 December 2010 14	PAOK	1–0	Iraklis	Thessaloniki
19:30 EET	Vieirinha 10' Manager: (Greece) Makis Chavos	Report	Manager: (Greece) Marinos Ouzounidis	Stadium: Toumba Stadium; Attendance: 13,063; Referee: Giorgos Stathopoulos

19 December 2010 15	Kerkyra	2–1	PAOK	Kerkyra
15:00 EET	Ilias Ioannou 6'; Ieroklis Stoltidis 49' Manager: (Serbia) Božidar Bandović	Report	45' Stefanos Athanasiadis Manager: (Greece) Makis Chavos	Stadium: Kerkyra Stadium; Attendance: 921; Referee: Alexandros Aretopoulos

5 January 2011 16	Panserraikos	1–1	PAOK	Serres
19:30 EET	Giorgos Georgiadis 72' Manager: (Serbia) Dragan Kokotović	Report	2' Dimitris Salpingidis Manager: (Greece) Makis Chavos	Stadium: Serres Municipal Stadium; Attendance: 5,177; Referee: Dimitris Thanos

9 January 2011 17	PAOK	1–0	Asteras Tripolis	Thessaloniki
17:15 EET	Dimitris Salpingidis 32' Manager: (Greece) Makis Chavos	Report	Manager: (Greece) Vangelis Vlachos	Stadium: Toumba Stadium; Attendance: 13,585; Referee: Christos Mhtsios

15 January 2011 18	Olympiacos Volos	0–3	PAOK	Volos
19:30 EET	Manager: (Greece) Sakis Tsiolis	Report	20' Lino; 43' Vieirinha; (penalty missed) 78', 87' Dimitris Salpingidis Manager: (Greece) Makis Chavos	Stadium: Panthessaliko Stadium; Attendance: 8,841; Referee: Anastasios Sidiropoulos

22 January 2011 19	PAOK	2–1	Xanthi	Thessaloniki
17:15 EET	Stefanos Athanasiadis 37'; Dimitris Salpingidis 81' Manager: (Greece) Makis Chavos	Report	65' Mauro Poy Manager: (Greece) Nikos Papadopoulos	Stadium: Toumba Stadium; Attendance: 13,873; Referee: Michalis Voskakis

22 January 2011 20	Aris	0–0	PAOK	Thessaloniki
19:30 EET		Report		Stadium: Kleanthis Vikelidis Stadium; Attendance: 13,234; Referee: Petros Konstantineas

6 February 2011 21	PAOK	0–1	Panathinaikos	Thessaloniki
19:30 EET	Manager: (Greece) Makis Chavos	Report	10' Sotiris Ninis Manager: (Portugal) Jesualdo Ferreira	Stadium: Toumba Stadium; Attendance: 22,008; Referee: Stavros Tritsonis

12 February 2011 22	Panionios	1–0	PAOK	Nea Smyrni, Athens
17:15 EET	Boško Balaban 72' (pen.) Manager: (Greece) Takis Lemonis	Report	Manager: (Greece) Makis Chavos	Stadium: Nea Smyrni Stadium; Attendance: 3,114; Referee: Giorgos Stathopoulos

27 February 2011 24	PAOK	0–2	Kavala	Thessaloniki
17:15 EET	Manager: (Greece) Makis Chavos	Report	37' Marius Niculae; 60' Leonel Ríos Manager: (Poland) Henryk Kasperczak	Stadium: Toumba Stadium; Attendance: 11,542; Referee: Andreas Pappas

6 March 2011 25	AEK Athens	4–0	PAOK	Athens
19:30 EET	Papa Bouba Diop 10'; Ignacio Scocco 35', 55'; Traianos Dellas 79' Manager: (Spain) Manuel Jiménez	Report	Manager: (Greece) Makis Chavos	Stadium: Olympic Stadium; Attendance: 5,518; Referee: Stavros Tritsonis

9 March 2011 23	PAOK	2–0	Ergotelis	Thessaloniki
17:15 EET	Pablo Contreras 17'; Stavros Tsoukalas 87' Manager: (Greece) Makis Chavos	Report	Manager: (Greece) Nikos Karageorgiou	Stadium: Toumba Stadium; Attendance: 7,069; Referee: Marios Labropoulos

13 March 2011 26	PAOK	2–1	Olympiacos	Thessaloniki
19:30 EET	Vasilios Koutsianikoulis 45'; Victor Vitolo 71' (pen.) Manager: (Greece) Makis Chavos	Report	12' Rafik Djebbour Manager: (Spain) Ernesto Valverde	Stadium: Toumba Stadium; Attendance: 20,023; Referee: Petros Konstantineas

20 March 2011 27	Atromitos	2–2	PAOK	Peristeri, Athens
19:00 EET	Stelios Sfakianakis 13', 88' Manager: (Greece) Georgios Donis	Report	19' Lino; 51' Nabil El Zhar Manager: (Greece) Makis Chavos	Stadium: Peristeri Stadium; Referee: Dimitris Thanos

3 April 2011 28	PAOK	1–0	AEL	Thessaloniki
19:00 EET	Stefanos Athanasiadis 68' Manager: (Greece) Makis Chavos	Report	Manager: (Greece) Nikos Kostenoglou	Stadium: Toumba Stadium; Attendance: 9,566; Referee: Michalis Voskakis

10 April 2011 29	Iraklis	0–0	PAOK	Thessaloniki
19:00 EET		Report		Stadium: Kaftanzoglio Stadium; Attendance: 2,760; Referee: Stavros Mantalos

17 April 2011 30	PAOK	2–0	Kerkyra	Thessaloniki
19:00 EET	Vladimir Ivić 9'; Stefanos Athanasiadis 78' Manager: (Greece) Makis Chavos	Report	Manager: (Serbia) Božidar Bandović	Stadium: Toumba Stadium; Referee: Vasilios Pamporidis

=== Play-offs ===
Pos	Team	Pld	W	D	L	GF	GA	GD	Pts	Qualification
2	Panathinaikos	6	3	1	2	9	5	+4	13	Qualification for the Champions League third qualifying round
3	PAOK	6	4	0	2	11	8	+3	12	Qualification for the Europa League third qualifying round
4	AEK Athens	6	2	1	3	6	6	0	8	Qualification for the Europa League play-off round (Note: AEK Athens have won the 2010–11 Greek Football Cup and are therefore qualified for the playoff round of the 2011–12 UEFA Europa League. As a consequence, the fourth-placed team of this group also entered the Europa League.)
5	Olympiacos Volos	6	2	0	4	5	12	−7	6	Qualification for the Europa League second qualifying round

Source: Super League Greece: Standings and Schedule
Rules for classification: 1) points; 2) head-to-head points; 3) head-to-head goal difference; 4) head-to-head goals scored; 5) goal difference; 6) number of goals scored.

==== Matches ====
Win Draw Loss

8 May 2011 1	PAOK	2–1	Panathinaikos	Thessaloniki
19:30 EET	Stefanos Athanasiadis 57'; Nabil El Zhar 75' Manager: (Greece) Makis Chavos	Report	80' Djibril Cissé Manager: (Portugal) Jesualdo Ferreira	Stadium: Toumba Stadium; Attendance: 19,391; Referee: Anastasios Sidiropoulos

12 May 2011 2	Olympiacos Volou	1–2	PAOK	Volos
19:30 EET	Juan Martín 62' Manager: (Greece) Makis Katsavakis	Report	33' Vieirinha; 54' Dimitris Salpingidis Manager: (Greece) Makis Chavos	Stadium: Panthessaliko Stadium; Attendance: 1,339; Referee: Vasilios Pamporidis

15 May 2011 3	AEK Athens	3–0	PAOK	Athens
18:15 EET	Traianos Dellas 21'; Papa Bouba Diop 47', 68' Manager: (Spain) Manuel Jiménez	Report	Manager: (Greece) Makis Chavos	Stadium: Olympic Stadium; Referee: Stavros Iosifidis

18 May 2011 4	PAOK	2–1	AEK Athens	Thessaloniki
19:30 EET	Pablo García 29'; Victor Vitolo 37' (pen.) Manager: (Greece) Makis Chavos	Report	14' Ignacio Scocco Manager: (Spain) Manuel Jiménez	Stadium: Toumba Stadium; Attendance: 19,075; Referee: Anastasios Sidiropoulos

22 May 2011 5	Panathinaikos	1–0	PAOK	Athens
20:30 EET	Gilberto Silva 74' Manager: (Portugal) Jesualdo Ferreira	Report	Manager: (Greece) Makis Chavos	Stadium: Olympic Stadium; Attendance: 19,800; Referee: Anastasios Kakos

25 May 2011 6	PAOK	5–1	Olympiacos Volos	Thessaloniki
20:30 EET	Dimitris Salpingidis 1', 50'; Vieirinha 11'; Diego Arias 38'; Zlatan Muslimovic 67' Manager: (Greece) Makis Chavos	Report	Martin 83'(p) Manager: (Greece) Makis Katsavakis	Stadium: Toumba Stadium; Attendance: 18,994; Referee: Athanasios Giachos

== Greek Football Cup ==
=== Fourth round ===
28 October 2010	Eordaikos	0–1 (a.e.t.)	PAOK	Florina
14:00		Report	120' Fotakis Manager: (Greece) Makis Chavos	Stadium: Florina Stadium; Referee: Andreas Pappas

=== Fifth round ===
22 December 2010	PAOK	2–1	PAS Giannina	Thessaloniki
15:30	Vanderson 2' (o.g.); Athanasiadis 42' Manager: (Greece) Makis Chavos	Report	53' Bakayoko Manager: (Belgium) Stéphane Demol	Stadium: Toumba Stadium; Referee: Michalis Voskakis

=== Quarter-finals ===
19 January 2011 1st leg	Olympiacos	1–1	PAOK	Piraeus
18:00	Modesto 45' Manager: (Spain) Ernesto Valverde	Report	82' Vieirinha Manager: (Greece) Makis Chavos	Stadium: Karaiskakis Stadium; Attendance: 28,404; Referee: Stavros Tritsonis

2 February 2011 2nd leg	PAOK	1–0 (2–1 agg.)	Olympiacos	Thessaloniki
18:00	Salpingidis 57' Manager: (Greece) Makis Chavos	Report	Manager: (Spain) Ernesto Valverde	Stadium: Toumba Stadium; Attendance: Cl. doors Referee: Stavros Mantalos

=== Semi-finals ===
2 March 2011 1st leg	AEK Athens	0–0	PAOK	Athens
21:00	Manager: (Spain) Manuel Jiménez	Report	Manager: (Greece) Makis Chavos	Stadium: Athens Olympic Stadium; Attendance: 25,000; Referee: Anastasios Sidiropoulos

16 March 2011 2nd leg	PAOK	0–1 (0–1 agg.)	AEK Athens	Thessaloniki
21:00	Manager: (Greece) Makis Chavos	Report	48' Dellas Manager: (Spain) Manuel Jiménez	Stadium: Toumba Stadium; Attendance: 28703; Referee: Stavros Mantalos

== UEFA Champions League ==
=== Third qualifying round ===
28 July 2010 1st leg	Ajax (Netherlands)	1–1	(Greece) PAOK	Amsterdam, Netherlands
20:45 CET	Suárez 13' Manager: (Netherlands) Martin Jol	Report	72' Ivić Manager: (Greece) Pavlos Dermitzakis	Stadium: Amsterdam Arena; Attendance: 24,151; Referee: (France) Tony Chapron

4 August 2010 2nd leg	PAOK (Greece)	3–3 (4–4a agg.)	(Netherlands) Ajax	Thessaloniki, Greece
20:45 CET	Vieirinha 16'; Salpingidis 56'; Ivić (penalty missed) 77', 90+1' Manager: (Greece) Pavlos Dermitzakis	Report	48' Suárez; 50'De Jong; 55' Lindgren Manager: (Netherlands) Martin Jol	Stadium: Toumba Stadium; Attendance: 24,109; Referee: (Spain) Carlos Velasco Carballo

PAOK advances to the UEFA Europa League play-off round as losers of the Champions league third qualifying round.

== UEFA Europa League ==
=== Play-off round ===
19 August 2010 1st leg	PAOK (Greece)	1–0	(Turkey) Fenerbahçe	Thessaloniki, Greece
20:30 CET	Vieirinha 19' Manager: (Greece) Pavlos Dermitzakis	Report	Manager: (Turkey) Aykut Kocaman	Stadium: Toumba Stadium; Attendance: 23,213; Referee: (Germany) Manuel Gräfe

26 August 2010 2nd leg	Fenerbahçe (Turkey)	1–1 (a.e.t.) (1–2 agg.)	(Greece) PAOK	Constantinople, Turkey
20:45 CET	Belözoğlu 51' Manager: (Turkey) Aykut Kocaman	Report	102' Muslimović Manager: (Greece) Pavlos Dermitzakis	Stadium: Şükrü Saracoğlu Stadium; Attendance: 39,863; Referee: (Italy) Paolo Tagliavento

=== Group D ===
Team	Pld	W	D	L	GF	GA	GD	Pts
(Spain) Villarreal	6	4	0	2	8	5	+3	12
(Greece) PAOK	6	3	2	1	5	3	+2	11
(Croatia) Dinamo Zagreb	6	2	1	3	4	5	−1	7
(Belgium) Club Brugge	6	0	3	3	4	8	−4	3

16 September 2010 1	Club Brugge (Belgium)	1–1	(Greece) PAOK	Bruges, Belgium
19:00 CEST (UTC+02:00)	Kouemaha 61' Manager: (Netherlands) Adrie Koster	Report	78' Malezas Manager: (Greece) Pavlos Dermitzakis	Stadium: Jan Breydel Stadium; Attendance: 17,525; Referee: (Sweden) Stefan Johannesson

30 September 2010 2	PAOK (Greece)	1–0	(Croatia) Dinamo Zagreb	Thessaloniki, Greece
21:05	Ivić 56' Manager: (Greece) Pavlos Dermitzakis	Report	Manager: (Bosnia and Herzegovina) Vahid Halilhodžić	Stadium: Toumba Stadium; Attendance: 17,297; Referee: (France) Fredy Fautrel

21 October 2010 3	Villarreal (Spain)	1–0	(Greece) PAOK	Villarreal, Spain
21:05	Ruben 38' Manager: (Spain) Juan Carlos Garrido	Report	Manager: (Greece) Makis Chavos	Stadium: Estadio El Madrigal; Attendance: 14,760; Referee: (Poland) Marcin Borski

4 November 2010 4	PAOK (Greece)	1–0	(Spain) Villarreal	Thessaloniki, Greece
19:00	Vieirinha 70' Manager: (Greece) Makis Chavos	Report	Manager: (Spain) Juan Carlos Garrido	Stadium: Toumba Stadium; Attendance: 22,779; Referee: (Netherlands) Eric Braamhaar

2 December 2010 5	PAOK (Greece)	1–1	(Belgium) Club Brugge	Thessaloniki, Greece
21:05 CET (UTC+01:00)	Vieirinha 25' Manager: (Greece) Makis Chavos	Report	89' Šćepović Manager: (Netherlands) Adrie Koster	Stadium: Toumba Stadium; Attendance: 19,424; Referee: (Northern Ireland) Mark Courtney

15 December 2010 6	Dinamo Zagreb (Croatia)	0–1	(Greece) PAOK	Zagreb, Croatia
19:00	Manager: (Bosnia and Herzegovina) Vahid Halilhodžić	Report	60' Salpingidis Manager: (Greece) Makis Chavos	Stadium: Stadion Maksimir; Attendance: 29,226; Referee: (England) Mark Clattenburg

=== Knockout round ===
==== Round of 32 ====
17 February 2011 1st leg	PAOK (Greece)	0–1	(Russia) CSKA Moscow	Thessaloniki, Greece
21:05 CEST (UTC+02:00)	Manager: (Greece) Makis Chavos	Report	29' Necid Manager: (Russia) Leonid Slutsky	Stadium: Toumba Stadium; Attendance: 22,245; Referee: (England) Andre Marriner

22 February 2011 2nd leg	CSKA Moscow (Russia)	1–1 (2–1 agg.)	(Greece) PAOK	Moscow, Russia
18:00 CEST (UTC+02:00)	Ignashevich 80' Manager: (Russia) Leonid Slutsky	Report	67' Muslimović Manager: (Greece) Makis Chavos	Stadium: Luzhniki Stadium; Attendance: 10,500; Referee: (France) Laurent Duhamel

== Statistics ==
=== Squad statistics ===
As of May 2011

Appearances denote players in the starting lineup, with the numbers in parentheses denoting appearances as substitute.

No.	Name	Super League		Greek Cup		Play-offs		Europa League		Champions League		Total	
No.	Name	Apps	Goals	Apps	Goals	Apps	Goals	Apps	Goals	Apps	Goals	Apps	Goals
Goalkeepers
1	(Greece) Kostas Chalkias	14	0	3	0	6	0	2	0	1	0	26	0
91	(Croatia) Dario Krešić	17 (1)	0	3	0	1 (1)	0	9 (1)	0	2 (1)	0	32 (4)	0
Defenders
3	(Tunisia) Anis Boussaïdi	12 (2)	0	1	0	0	0	6	0	2	0	21 (2)	0
8	(Italy) Bruno Cirillo	22	1	5	0	4	0	7	0	2	0	40	1
13	(Greece) Stelios Malezas	15	0	1	0	3 (1)	0	3	1	1	0	23 (1)	1
15	(Chile) Pablo Contreras	22	3	5	0	5	0	10	0	1	0	43	3
16	(Brazil) Lino	17 (3)	2	4	0	6 (1)	0	5	0	0	0	32 (4)	2
23	(Greece) Sakellariou	10 (2)	0	2	0	0	0	3 (1)	0	0	0	15 (3)	0
27	(Poland) Mirosław Sznaucner	17 (1)	0	5	0	4 (2)	0	7 (1)	0	2	0	35 (4)	0
36	(Italy) Mirko Savini	7 (3)	0	3 (2)	0	1 (1)	0	0	0	0	0	11 (6)	0
42	(Angola) Francisco Zuela	7 (4)	0	1	0	0	0	2 (1)	0	0	0	10 (5)	0
77	(Brazil) Etto	9 (1)	0	0	0	5	0	0	0	0	0	14 (1)	0
Midfielders
4	(Greece) Sotiris Balafas	5 (3)	0	2 (2)	0	1	0	1 (1)	0	0	0	9 (6)	0
5	(Uruguay) Pablo García	24 (1)	1	5	0	4	1	9	0	2	0	44 (1)	2
6	(Spain) Victor Vitolo	19 (1)	1	2	0	6	1	8	0	2	0	37 (1)	2
7	(Morocco) Nabil El Zhar	19 (7)	1	4 (3)	0	5 (4)	1	7 (5)	0	0	0	35 (19)	2
10	(France) Olivier Sorlin	1	0	0	0	0	0	2 (1)	0	2	0	5 (1)	0
18	(Greece) Giorgos Fotakis	18 (2)	2	4 (1)	1	5 (1)	0	6 (1)	0	1 (1)	0	34 (6)	3
19	(Greece) Koutsianikoulis	8 (5)	1	3 (2)	0	0	0	2 (2)	0	0	0	13 (9)	1
20	(Portugal) Vieirinha	26 (1)	4	4	1	5	2	10	3	2	1	47 (1)	11
21	(Serbia) Vladimir Ivić	22 (2)	2	5 (1)	0	1	0	8	1	2	2	38 (3)	5
26	(Albania) Ergys Kaçe	1 (1)	0	0	0	0	0	0	0	0	0	1 (1)	0
28	(Greece) Stavros Tsoukalas	12 (2)	1	4 (1)	0	3 (1)	0	2	0	0	0	21 (4)	1
80	(Portugal) Cristiano	7 (5)	0	2	0	0	0	0	0	0	0	9 (5)	0
85	(Colombia) Diego Arias	5 (4)	0	0	0	2 (1)	1	0	0	0	0	7 (5)	1
Forwards
9	(Greece) Dimitris Salpingidis	30 (4)	6	6	1	6	3	9 (1)	1	2	1	53 (5)	12
11	(Bosnia and Herzegovina) Zlatan Muslimovic	16 (8)	1	4 (2)	0	5 (4)	1	6 (2)	2	1 (1)	0	32 (17)	4
14	(Greece) Athanasios Papazoglou	8 (8)	1	1	0	0	0	2 (1)	0	1 (1)	0	12 (10)	1
31	(Argentina) Lucio Filomeno	10 (8)	0	2 (2)	0	0	0	5 (4)	0	1 (1)	0	18 (15)	0
33	(Greece) Stefanos Athanasiadis	16 (7)	5	2 (1)	1	5	1	5 (4)	0	0	0	28 (12)	7

=== Goalscorers ===
Rank	No.	Pos.	Player	Super League	Greek Cup	Play-offs	Europa League	Champions League	Total
1	9	FW	(Greece) Dimitris Salpingidis	6	1	3	1	1	12
2	20	MF	(Portugal) Vieirinha	4	1	2	3	1	11
3	33	FW	(Greece) Athanasiadis	5	1	1	0	0	7
4	21	MF	(Serbia) Vladimir Ivic	2	0	0	1	2	5
5	11	FW	(Bosnia and Herzegovina) Zlatan Muslimovic	1	0	1	2	0	4
6	15	DF	(Chile) Pablo Contreras	3	0	0	0	0	3
7	18	MF	(Greece) Giorgos Fotakis	2	1	0	0	0	3
8	16	DF	(Brazil) Lino	2	0	0	0	0	2
9	5	MF	(Uruguay) Pablo García	1	0	1	0	0	2
10	6	MF	(Spain) Victor Vitolo	1	0	1	0	0	2
11	7	MF	(Morocco) Nabil El Zhar	1	0	1	0	0	2
12	14	FW	(Greece) Papazoglou	1	0	0	0	0	1
13	19	MF	(Greece) Koutsianikoulis	1	0	0	0	0	1
14	28	MF	(Greece) Stavros Tsoukalas	1	0	0	0	0	1
15	8	DF	(Greece) Bruno Cirillo	1	0	0	0	0	1
16	13	DF	(Greece) Stelios Malezas	0	0	0	1	0	1
17	85	MF	(Colombia) Diego Arias	0	0	1	0	0	1
Own goals				0	1	0	0	0	1
TOTALS				32	5	11	8	4	60

=== Disciplinary record ===
No.	Pos	Nat	Name	Super League			Greek Cup			Play-off			Europa League			Champions League			Total			Notes
No.	Pos	Nat	Name	Yellow card	(yellow card) (yellow-red card)	Red card	Yellow card	(yellow card) (yellow-red card)	Red card	Yellow card	(yellow card) (yellow-red card)	Red card	Yellow card	(yellow card) (yellow-red card)	Red card	Yellow card	(yellow card) (yellow-red card)	Red card	Yellow card	(yellow card) (yellow-red card)	Red card	Notes
8	DF	(Italy)	Bruno Cirillo	7	2		2			1			3			1			14	2		
15	DF	(Chile)	Pablo Contreras	7	2		1			3			2						13	2		
5	MF	(Uruguay)	Pablo García	8						1		1	3						12		1	
6	MF	(Spain)	Victor Vitolo	6			1			1			2	1		1			11	1		
20	MF	(Portugal)	Vieirinha	6			2						1						9			
27	DF	(Poland)	Mirosław Sznaucner	6									3						9			
21	MF	(Serbia)	Vladimir Ivić	3	1		1	1					1			1			6	2		
18	MF	(Greece)	Giorgos Fotakis	5		1	2												7		1	
3	DF	(Tunisia)	Anis Boussaidi	4									3			1			8			
16	DF	(Brazil)	Lino	1			1	1		2									4	1		
11	FW	(Bosnia and Herzegovina)	Zlatan Muslimovic	1			1			1			2						5			
36	DF	(Italy)	Mirko Savini	2			1				1								3	1		
1	GK	(Greece)	Kostas Chalkias	2			1			1									4			
7	MF	(Morocco)	Nabil El Zhar	3															3			
33	FW	(Greece)	Stefanos Athanasiadis	3															3			
28	MF	(Greece)	Stavros Tsoukalas	2			1												3			
77	DF	(Brazil)	Etto	2						1									3			
13	DF	(Greece)	Stelios Malezas	1						1			1						3			
9	FW	(Greece)	Dimitris Salpingidis	1									2						3			
31	FW	(Argentina)	Lucio Filomeno	1			1												2			
14	FW	(Greece)	Papazoglou	1															1			
19	MF	(Greece)	Koutsianikoulis	1															1			
4	MF	(Greece)	Sotiris Balafas	1															1			
23	DF	(Greece)	Sakellariou										1						1			
42	DF	(Angola)	Francisco Zuela										1						1			
91	GK	(Croatia)	Dario Krešić										1						1			
			TOTAL	74	5	1	15	2	0	12	1	1	26	1	0	4	0	0	131	9	2	

Only competitive matches

Ordered by (red card) , (yellow card) (yellow-red card) and (yellow card)
(yellow card) = Number of bookings; (yellow card) (yellow-red card) = Number of sending offs after a second yellow card; (red card) = Number of sending offs by a direct red card.
0 shown as blank

Source: Match reports in competitive matches, superleaguegreece.net Archived 21 February 2017 at the Wayback Machine, uefa.com, soccerway.com
