= Dimitrios Eleftheropoulos =

Greek footballer and manager

Personal information
- Date of birth: 7 August 1976 (age 50)
- Place of birth: Piraeus, Greece
- Height: 1.90 m (6 ft 3 in)
- Position: Goalkeeper

Senior career*
Years	Team	Apps	(Gls)
1994–2004	Olympiacos	152	(0)
1995–1996	→ Proodeftiki (loan)	30	(0)
2004–2005	Messina	10	(0)
2005–2006	AC Milan	0	(0)
2006	Roma	0	(0)
2006–2007	Ascoli	14	(0)
2007–2009	Siena	14	(0)
2009–2010	PAS Giannina	16	(0)
2010–2011	Iraklis	26	(0)
2011–2012	Panionios	12	(0)
Total		274	(0)

International career
1995	Greece U18	4	(0)
1999–2001	Greece	12	(0)

Managerial career
- 2012–2013: Panionios
- 2013: AEK Larnaca
- 2015: Olympiacos Volos
- 2015–2016: Panthrakikos
- 2016: Veria
- 2016–2017: Asteras Tripolis
- 2017: Kerkyra
- 2018: Iraklis
- 2020: Panachaiki
- 2022: A.E. Kifisia
- 2022: Panserraikos
- 2022–2024: Niki Volos
Medal record
Men's football
Representing Greece
World Military Cup
Winner	1997
UEFA European U-21 Championship
Runner-up	1998
- * Club domestic league appearances and goals

Dimitrios Eleftheropoulos (Greek: Δημήτριος Ελευθερόπουλος; born 7 August 1976) is a Greek professional football manager and former player.

== Club career ==
=== Greece ===
Eleftheropoulos was born in Piraeus, and was an ardent supporter of major Greek club Olympiacos, where he started playing as a goalkeeper at a very young age. Except for 1996, when he was loaned to Proodeftiki, he played for Olympiakos from 1994 to 2004, winning seven championships in a row.

He was the young third goalkeeper in 1997's Olympiacos roster behind Foto Strakosha and Alekos Rantos, but the injuries and bad performances from the previous two made the manager, Dušan Bajević give him a chance. His astonishing performances, which included impossible saves and penalty stops eventually lifted Eleftheropoulos to the level of an idol earning the nickname of "The Eagle", being one of the masterpieces for Olympiakos championship after ten years of disappointments.

He lost nearly all the 1998 season due to a severe knee injury, which was worsened by a badly treated arthrosis that also affected his shoulder. This did not prevent a glorious comeback in the 1999 UEFA Champions League, with Olympiacos advancing to the quarterfinals for the first time and being chosen as the best goalkeeper in the competition.

On 23 October 2001, Eleftheropoulos made a sensational penalty save to Ruud van Nistelrooy in the 65th minute between Manchester United and Olympiacos for Champions League, in Old Trafford. It was the only penalty missed by the Dutch international striker for that season.

He is also remembered by some for being the goalkeeper present during the worst loss of any Greek team in the Champions League, when on 10 December 2003 Olympiakos lost to Juventus 7–0.

=== Italy ===
In 2004, Eleftheropoulos transferred to newly promoted Serie A side Messina, where, despite some great performances, he could not unseat Marco Storari in the starting eleven.

In 2005, he was signed by AC Milan. Even though, due to a series of subpar performances in friendlies against Chelsea and Chicago Fire during a summer tour in the United States, coupled with Milan's heavy surplus of goalkeepers, he was sold to Roma where he remained game-less for the entire season.

Eleftheropoulos signed for Ascoli for the Serie A 2006-07 and on 25 February 2007 he played his first Serie A match for Ascoli against Livorno.

On 11 June 2007, he was signed by Siena on free transfer, for a two-year deal, where although beginning the season in the starting eleven, he finished as the substitute goalkeeper behind Austrian international Alex Manninger. According to Siena's official website, on 28 May 2009, Eleftheropoulos decided to leave the club for family reasons.

=== Return to Greece ===
On 30 May 2009, Eleftheropoulos signed with PAS Giannina, which had been promoted to the Super League Greece. He started his new season becoming the most experienced player for his new club. Great saves during matches against Kavala, his former team Olympiacos and AEK Athens contributed to achieve victory for PAS Giannina and himself to be elected as Man of the Match. Eleftheropoulos after five years reached again the semi-final of the Greek Cup with his new club against Panathinaikos.

On 3 August 2010, Eleftheropoulos signed a contract with Iraklis.

In the summer 2011, he signed for Panionios. He announced the end of his career on 21 December 2011.

== International career ==
Eleftheropoulos got his first of twelve senior international caps for Greece in a friendly against Belgium in 1999. From these caps, three were in the 2002 FIFA World Cup qualification rounds for the European zone; where although having brilliant performances in both games against Germany, he was left aside from the national team after a strong cross with coach Vassilis Daniil. For the Euro 2004, coach Otto Rehhagel chose Antonis Nikopolidis as his starting keeper and Konstantinos Chalkias and Fanis Katergiannakis as substitutes, leaving Eleftheropoulos out of the roster.

== Style of play ==
In his prime, Eleftheropoulos was an agile and athletic goalkeeper with quick reflexes and tremendous shot-stopping skills, both in short and long-range shots. Furthermore, he was known for his brave and risky style, which he used effectively while rushing off his line in one on one situations. Furthermore, he was a skilled penalty-stopper, making crucial saves, especially in European matches (notably, against Ruud van Nistelrooy in an Old Trafford match in 2001). Despite being effective while playing on goal, though, he faced several problems while handling crosses and his performances were negatively affected from time to time due to serious injuries.

== Managerial career ==
Eleftheropoulos started his managerial career at Panionios. He most recently managed Super League side Asteras Tripolis, as he was appointed to replace Makis Chavos on 27 September 2016. For the third consecutive time he teamed up with his former club teammate Stylianos Venetidis who served as assistant manager. His contract was terminated on 17 February 2017 by mutual consent, on grounds of successive poor results culminating to a 0-5 heavy home defeat against Panathinaikos.

== Career statistics ==
=== Club ===
Appearances and goals by club, season and competition
Club	Season	League			Cup		Europe		Other		Total	
Club	Season	Division	Apps	Goals	Apps	Goals	Apps	Goals	Apps	Goals	Apps	Goals
Olympiacos	1994–95	Alpha Ethniki	0	0	0	0	—		—		0	0
Olympiacos	1996–97	Alpha Ethniki	31	0	8	0	0	0	—		39	0
Olympiacos	1997–98	Alpha Ethniki	3	0	0	0	2 (Note: Appearance(s) in UEFA Champions League)	0	—		5	0
Olympiacos	1998–99	Alpha Ethniki	31	0	7	0	10	0	—		48	0
Olympiacos	1999–2000	Alpha Ethniki	32	0	5	0	8 (Note: Six appearances in UEFA Champions League, two appearances in UEFA Cup)	0	—		45	0
Olympiacos	2000–01	Alpha Ethniki	21	0	7	0	8 (Note: Six appearances in UEFA Champions League, two appearances in UEFA Cup)	0	—		36	0
Olympiacos	2001–02	Alpha Ethniki	15	0	3	0	5	0	—		23	0
Olympiacos	2002–03	Alpha Ethniki	15	0	1	0	6	0	—		22	0
Olympiacos	2003–04	Alpha Ethniki	4	0	1	0	1	0	—		6	0
Olympiacos	Total		152	0	32	0	40	0	—		224	0
Proodeftiki (loan)	1995–96	Beta Ethniki	30	0	0	0	—		—		30	0
Messina	2004–05	Serie A	10	0	3	0	—		—		13	0
Roma	2005–06	Serie A	0	0	0	0	0	0	—		0	0
Ascoli	2006–07	Serie A	14	0	0	0	—		—		14	0
Siena	2007–08	Serie A	12	0	1	0	—		—		13	0
Siena	2008–09	Serie A	2	0	0	0	—		—		2	0
Siena	Total		14	0	1	0	—		—		15	0
PAS Giannina	2009–10	Super League Greece	16	0	0	0	—		—		16	0
Iraklis	2010–11	Super League Greece	26	0	2	0	—		—		28	0
Panionios	2011–12	Super League Greece	12	0	0	0	—		—		12	0
Career total			274	0	38	0	40	0	4	0	352	0

=== International ===
Appearances and goals by national team and year
National team	Year	Apps	Goals
Greece	1998	0	0
Greece	1999	6	0
Greece	2000	1	0
Greece	2001	5	0
Total		12	0

== Managerial statistics ==
As of 11 February 2017

Team	From	To	Record				
Team	From	To	G	W	D	L	Win %
Panionios	29 May 2012	16 February 2013	24	9	1	14	37.50
AEK Larnaca	1 July 2013	15 December 2013	13	4	4	5	30.77
Olympiacos Volos	6 January 2015	30 June 2015	24	13	2	9	54.17
Panthrakikos	19 September 2015	26 January 2016	19	3	8	8	15.79
Veria	26 January 2016	8 July 2016	11	1	5	5	9.09
Asteras Tripolis	27 September 2016	17 February 2017	24	10	6	8	41.67
Kerkyra	31 May 2017	20 August 2017	1	0	0	1	0.00
Iraklis	14 November 2018	16 December 2018	6	2	0	4	33.33
Panachaiki	1 July 2020	19 October 2020	0	0	0	0	—
A.E. Kifisia	20 January 2022	11 May 2022	19	9	3	7	47.37
Panserraikos	1 July 2022	21 November 2022	5	3	1	1	60.00
Niki Volos	16 December 2022	24 May 2024	56	26	13	17	46.43
Total			202	80	43	79	39.60

== Honours ==
Olympiacos

- Alpha Ethniki: 1996–97, 1997–98, 1998–99, 1999–2000, 2000–01, 2001–02, 2002–03
- Greek Cup: 1998-1999

Greece U21

- UEFA European Under-21 Championship runner-up: 1998
