= Dario Krešić =

Croatian footballer (born 1984)

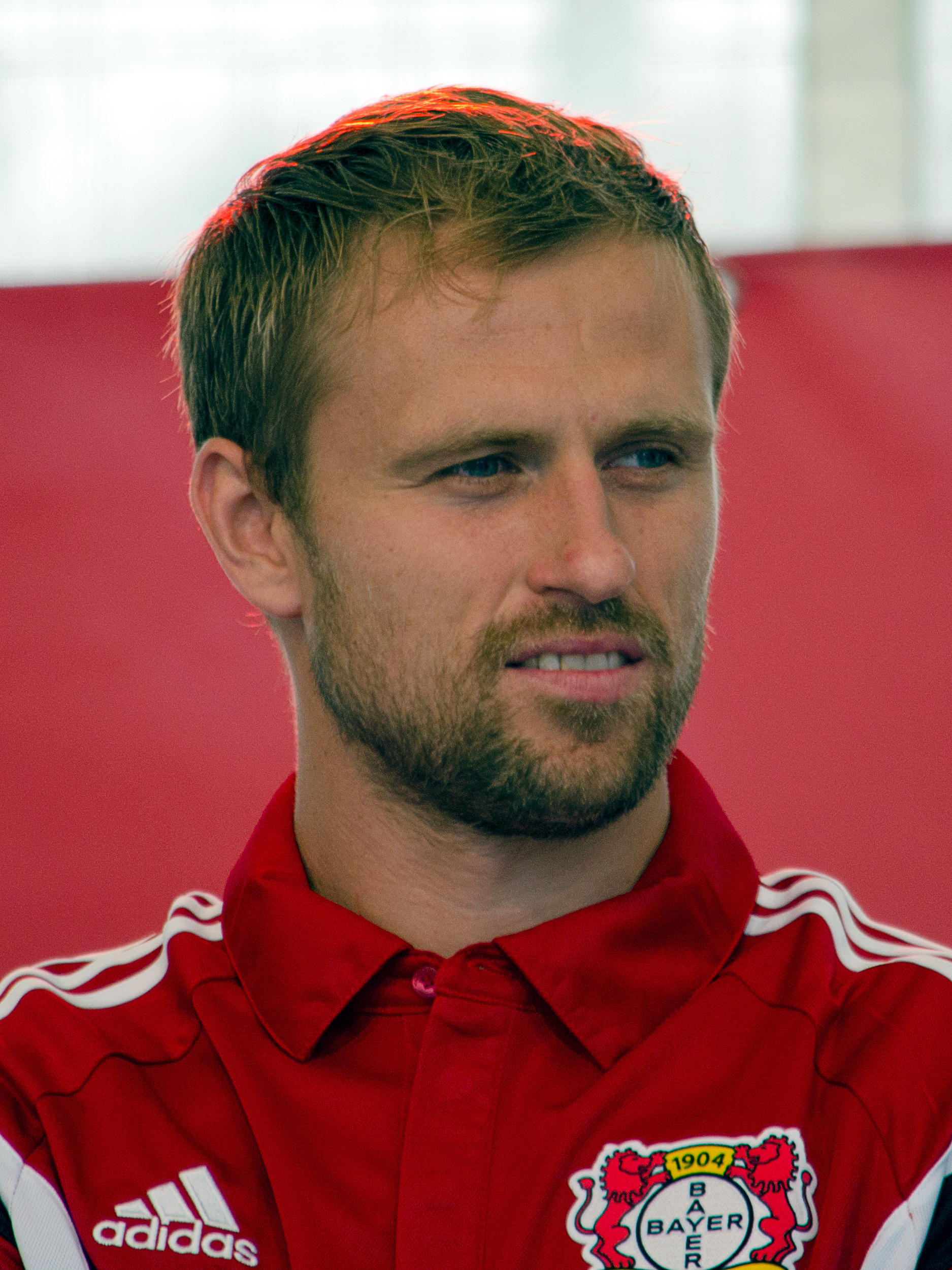
- Krešić with Leverkusen in 2014

Personal information
- Full name: Dario Krešić
- Date of birth: 11 January 1984 (age 42)
- Place of birth: Vukovar, SR Croatia, SFR Yugoslavia
- Height: 1.96 m (6 ft 5 in)
- Position: Goalkeeper

Youth career
- –1996: Mladost Buzin
- 1996–2000: NK Hrvatski Dragovoljac
- 2000–2002: VfB Stuttgart

Senior career*
Years	Team	Apps	(Gls)
2002–2006	Eintracht Trier	34	(0)
2006–2009	Panionios	52	(0)
2009–2012	PAOK	36	(0)
2012–2013	Lokomotiv Moscow	17	(0)
2013–2014	Mainz 05	0	(0)
2014–2016	Bayer Leverkusen	1	(0)
2016–2017	Omonia	3	(0)
Total		143	(0)

International career
1999	Croatia U15	2	(0)
2001	Croatia U16	4	(0)
2000–2001	Croatia U17	11	(0)
2002	Croatia U18	1	(0)
2002	Croatia U19	2	(0)
2004	Croatia U21	1	(0)
2013	Croatia	1	(0)
- * Club domestic league appearances and goals

Dario Krešić (born 11 January 1984) is a Croatian retired professional footballer who played as a goalkeeper.

== Club career ==
=== Panionios ===
The Croatian shot-stopper spent three seasons (2006–2009) at Panionios F.C., where he made 56 appearances for the Athenian side in all competitions. He became the first-choice goalkeeper for the team in his second season, and his solid play between the posts played a crucial role in Panionios' run to the 2007–08 Super League play-offs last season.

=== PAOK ===
He moved to PAOK FC in June 2009 on a free transfer from Panionios F.C. At PAOK, Krešić was expected to challenge Greece international goalkeeper Kostas Chalkias for the starting role. While Chalkias' experience played a key role in PAOK's ability to clinch a berth in the UEFA Europa League next season, Krešić's athleticism and potential will most definitely challenge Chalkias' tenure between the goal posts. On 28 July 2010, PAOK was playing against Ajax in Amsterdam Arena and Kostas Chalkias who was injured at the 15th minute was substituted by Krešić. He played in 18 games in the 2010–11 season, as of November 2010. He was also voted MVP of the team three times.

On 27 July, when Krešić realised that he was not counted as the main goalkeeper of the team, he asked to leave from the club. PAOK released him the next day.

=== Lokomotiv Moscow ===
On 31 July 2012, Krešić signed a two-year contract with FC Lokomotiv Moscow. He made his debut for the new club on 11 August 2012 against Alania Vladikavkaz. After having made only one substitute appearance for Lokomotiv in the first part of 2013–14 season, Krešić was released by his club.

=== Mainz 05 ===
On 6 January 2014, 1. FSV Mainz 05 signed Krešić for the remaining part of 2013–14 season with an option until 2016.

=== Bayer Leverkusen ===
On 23 May 2014, Krešić joined Bayer 04 Leverkusen on a free transfer, signing a two-year contract, which would keep him at the club until June 2016.

=== Omonia ===
On 20 August 2016, he signed with AC Omonia in Cyprus. He had 7 appearances with the club. On 26 May 2017 the club announced that with the end of the season the player is released.

== International career ==
Krešić debuted for Croatia national football team on 10 September 2013 in a friendly match against South Korea, playing for 90 minutes before he was substituted in the injury time of the game. It would be Krešić's only appearance for the national side.

== Career statistics ==
=== Club ===
Appearances and goals by club, season and competition
Club	Season	League			Cup		Europe		Other		Total	
Club	Season	Division	Apps	Goals	Apps	Goals	Apps	Goals	Apps	Goals	Apps	Goals
Eintracht Trier	2002–03	2. Bundesliga	1	0	0	0	—		—		1	0
Eintracht Trier	2003–04	2. Bundesliga	0	0	0	0	—		—		0	0
Eintracht Trier	2004–05	2. Bundesliga	15	0	2	0	—		—		17	0
Eintracht Trier	2005–06	Regionalliga Süd	18	0	0	0	—		—		18	0
Eintracht Trier	Total		34	0	2	0	—		—		36	0
Panionios	2006–07	Super League Greece	6	0	2	0	0	0	—		8	0
Panionios	2007–08	Super League Greece	25	0	1	0	3	0	—		29	0
Panionios	2008–09	Super League Greece	21	0	3	0	4	0	—		28	0
Panionios	Total		52	0	6	0	7	0	—		65	0
PAOK	2009–10	Super League Greece	6	0	1	0	0	0	—		7	0
PAOK	2010–11	Super League Greece	18	0	3	0	11	0	—		32	0
PAOK	2011–12	Super League Greece	12	0	0	0	8	0	—		20	0
PAOK	Total		36	0	4	0	19	0	—		59	0
Lokomotiv Moscow	2012–13	Russian Premier League	16	0	1	0	—		—		17	0
Lokomotiv Moscow	2013–14	Russian Premier League	1	0	1	0	—		—		2	0
Lokomotiv Moscow	Total		17	0	2	0	—		—		19	0
Mainz 05	2013–14	Bundesliga	0	0	—		—		—		0	0
Bayer Leverkusen	2014–15	Bundesliga	0	0	0	0	0	0	—		0	0
Bayer Leverkusen	2015–16	Bundesliga	1	0	1	0	0	0	—		2	0
Bayer Leverkusen	Total		1	0	1	0	0	0	—		2	0
Omonia	2016–17	Cypriot First Division	3	0	0	0	—		—		3	0
Career total			143	0	15	0	26	0	0	0	184	0
