= Fanis Katergiannakis =

Greek footballer

Personal information
- Full name: Theofanis Katergiannakis
- Date of birth: 16 February 1974 (age 52)
- Place of birth: Pylaia, Greece
- Height: 1.89 m (6 ft 2 in)
- Position: Goalkeeper

Youth career
- 1993–1994: Ethnikos Pylaias

Senior career*
Years	Team	Apps	(Gls)
1993–1994	Ethnikos Pylaias	22	(0)
1994–2002	Aris	129	(0)
2002–2004	Olympiacos	28	(0)
2004–2005	Cagliari Calcio	15	(0)
2005–2007	Iraklis	3	(0)
2008–2011	Kavala	34	(0)
Total		273	(0)

International career
1999–2004	Greece	6	(0)

Managerial career
- 2018–: Greece U21 (Goalkeeping coach)
Medal record
Men's football
Representing Greece
UEFA European Championship
Winner	2004
- * Club domestic league appearances and goals

Fanis Katergiannakis (Greek: Φάνης Κατεργιαννάκης, born 16 February 1974) is a Greek former professional footballer who played as a goalkeeper.

== Club career ==
=== Ethnikos Pylaias ===
Katergiannakis started his career in the young team for Ethnikos Pylaias a team in his town in Tracia. In the season 1992–93 Ethnikos Pylaias, with Katergiannakis as goalkeeper achieved a great season, gained the Greek Fourth Division. After that Katergiannakis received an offer from Aris Thessaloniki F.C. the mean club in Thessaloniki quite hard to refuse.

=== Aris ===
In the summer 1994, Katergiannakis signed for Aris and in the season 1997–1998 Katergiannakis, achieved a great season becoming the first goalkeeper and helping the team a soon the promotion to the First Division. The next season made his great contribution to promote Aris for the UEFA Cup and saved a penalty to Greek top scorer Demis Nikolaidis. The match of 27 January 2002 between Olympiacos and Aris Thessaloniki F.C., Katergiannakis saved so many opportunity from Stelios Giannakopoulos, Alexandros Alexandris, Predrag Đorđević, Christian Karembeu. The club of Thessaloniki won 1–0 in Athens and this was the only match lost at home for Olympiacos that in that season won the league and after this match few teams try to make a new contract for Katergiannakis.

=== Olympiacos ===
In the summer 2002 Katergiannakis signed a two-year contract with Olympiacos to become second goalkeeper behind Dimitrios Eleftheropoulos. He won the league with Olympiacos in the 2002–03 season, after a big competition with the other goalkeeper Eleftheropoulos that he become injured during the match with the rival Panathinaikos. Katergiannakis became the first goalkeeper helping his new club to win the 7th consecutive league title and the qualification for the UEFA Champions League and reached the final of Greek Cups against the rivals, AEK Athens. The next season the coach Oleh Protasov declared that Katergiannakis and Eleftheropoulos were both titular goalkeepers of the first team of Olympiacos. The coach Otto Rehhagel, called him up to the national team.

=== Cagliari Calcio ===
After he won Euro 2004 with Greece, Olympiacos decided to acquire the goalkeeper, Antonis Nikopolidis. For the two goalkeepers, there was less space and Dimitrios Eleftheropoulos signed for the Italian club Messina and Katergiannakis signed for another Italian club Cagliari in Serie A. Famous to be the first team of the main cities to win the league in Serie A. Katergiannakis in Cagliari, found players like David Suazo and the Italian star Gianfranco Zola ready to help Cagliari Calcio to achieve a season.

=== Iraklis ===
In the summer 2005, Katergiannakis signed a two-year contract with Iraklis. Katergiannakis here met Georgios Georgiadis, teammate in the Greece national football team in the Euro 2004 triumph. That year Iraklis finished in 4th place in the Greek First Division, qualifying for the UEFA Europa League.

=== Kavala ===
In the summer 2008, Katergiannakis signed for Kavala in Greek Second Division and he helped the team to gain the third place behind Antromitos and PAS Giannina and promote the team to the Greek league after a after ten-year absence. He was the goalkeeper to concede the least goals in the 2008–09 season. In the summer 2009, he also found in Kavala another player (Vasilios Lakis) with whom he won Euro 2004 with the Greece national football team, acquired by club to reinforce the team for the 2009–10 season.

on 17 February 2010, Katergiannakis reached the semifinals of the Greek Cup with Kavala, where he faced Aris, with whom he made his debut as a professional player. He reached the sixth place in the championship with Kavala. In the summer of 2011, both Katergiannakis and Kavala decided to end the contract.

== International career ==
He made his debut for the Greece national football team in November 1999 against Bulgaria replacing the Greek goalkeeper Antonis Nikopolidis. Katergiannakis was included in the national team that won Euro 2004 in Portugal with the other goalkeepers Antonis Nikopolidis and Konstantinos Chalkias.

== After retirement ==
In November 2018, Katergiannakis was hired as the goalkeeping coach of the Greece national football team.

== Personal ==
His daughter Sylia (b.2005) is also a professional goalkeeper, and she signed with PAOK in 2022

== Honours ==
Olympiacos

- Alpha Ethniki: 2002–03

Aris

- Beta Ethniki: 1997–98

Kavala

- Beta Ethniki: 2007–08

Greece

- European Championship: 2004

Individual

- Greek Best Goalkeeper of the Beta Division: 2009
