= Michalis Sifakis =

Greek footballer

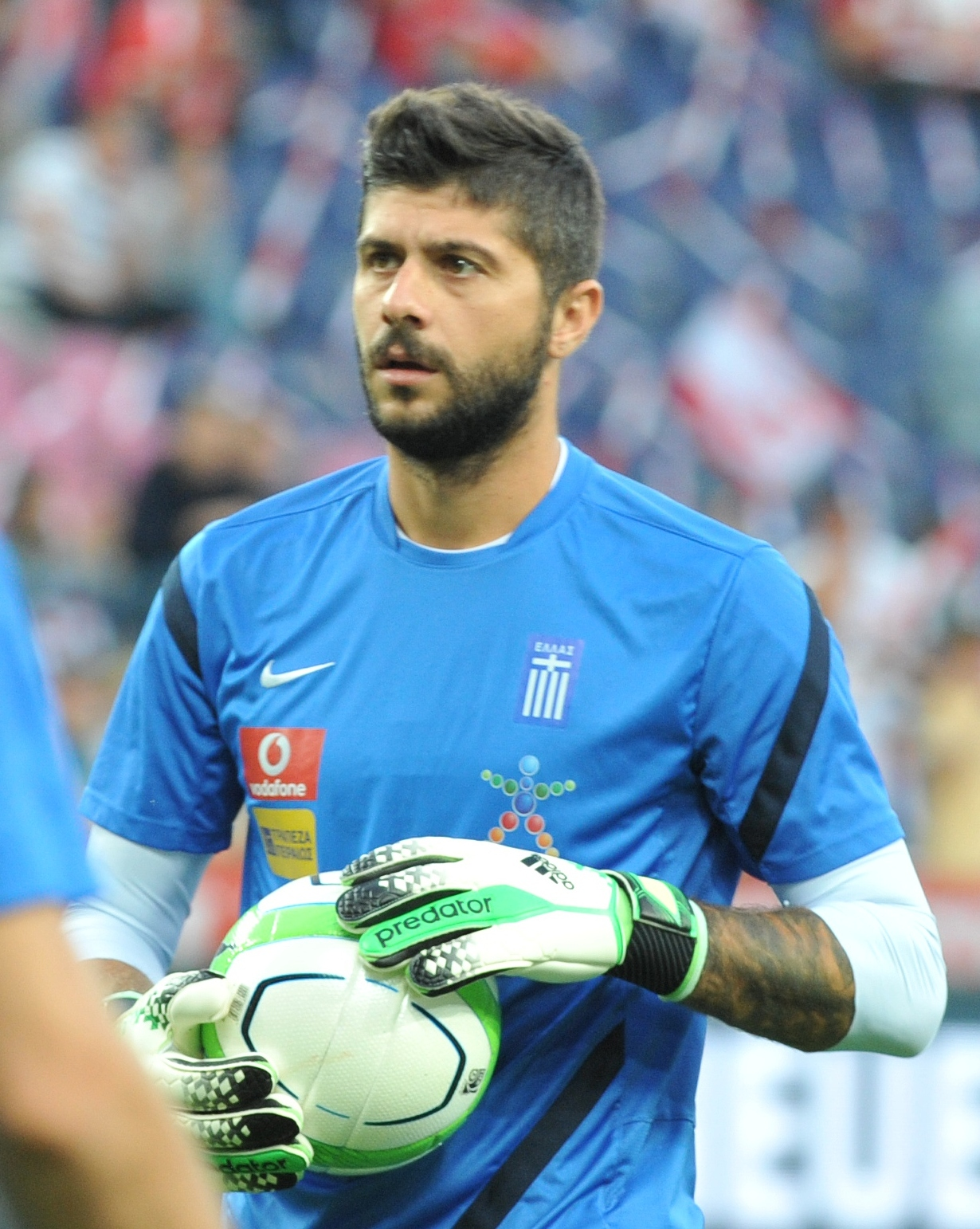
- Sifakis with Greece

Personal information
- Full name: Michail Sifakis
- Date of birth: 9 September 1984 (age 42)
- Place of birth: Heraklion, Crete, Greece
- Height: 1.87 m (6 ft 2 in)
- Position: Goalkeeper

Youth career
- 1999–2002: OFI

Senior career*
Years	Team	Apps	(Gls)
2002–2007	OFI	105	(0)
2007–2008	Olympiacos	2	(0)
2008–2012	Aris	80	(0)
2012–2013	Charleroi	10	(0)
2013–2014	Atromitos	11	(0)
2014–2015	Levadiakos	25	(0)
2015–2017	Kortrijk	16	(0)
2017–2018	Samsunspor	6	(0)
Total		255	(0)

International career
2004–2005	Greece U21	15	(0)
2005–2012	Greece	15	(0)
- * Club domestic league appearances and goals

Michalis Sifakis (Greek: Μιχάλης Σηφάκης; born 9 September 1984) is a Greek former professional footballer who played as a goalkeeper.

== Early years ==
Born in Heraklion, Greece, Sifakis started playing football at the age of 9. His first team was Atsalenios.

== Club career ==
=== OFI ===
In 1999 Sifakis was transferred to OFI where he played with the B squad of OFI until 2002. In 2002, he signed his first professional contract with the club. He played for OFI until 2007 and participated in 112 matches in the Greek championship and cup.

=== Olympiacos ===
In 2007, the team Olympiacos made an offer for Sifakis, which was accepted by OFI, and he played as a replacement of the national goalkeeper Antonis Nikopolidis. During the season 2007–2008 his team won the Greek championship, the Greek Cup and the Greek Super Cup. And then he continued to be the replacement.

=== Aris ===
In 2008, Aris made an offer to OFI and Sifakis was transferred to the club. During the season 2008–2009 Sifakis participated in 27 league and cup matches. He participated in all league games of the 2009–2010 season. In the season 2009–2010, he participated with Aris in the final of Greek Cup, losing against Panathinaikos by 1–0. His reaction in the goal, a long-distance shot by Leto, was very slow and his performance was questionable. In the season 2010–2011 he passed the group stage of the Europa League with Aris and were then eliminated by Manchester City of Roberto Mancini, at Round of 32 of the competition. In the following season (2011–2012) he had some medical problems that kept him away from some Aris and national squad's matches. In April 2013 Sifakis demands through his lawyers 988.000 euros from the almost bankrupt Aris, although his unpaid wages are 188.000.

=== Charleroi ===
Newly promoted Jupiler Pro League side Charleroi are set to sign Michalis Sifakis on a free transfer after the Greek 'keeper severed ties with Aris at the end of last season. Part of Greece's UEFA EURO 2012 contingent this past summer, Sifakis replaced Kostas Chalkias midway through Greece's Group A clash with the Czech Republic and carried the mantle for the national team until Greece were eliminated by Germany in the quarter-finals. Sifakis should have plenty of competition at the club as other 'keepers in the squad include Parfait Mandanda, the brother of Marseille and France shot-stopper Steve Mandanda. Failing to sign anywhere all summer long, Greece manager Fernando Santos forced to leave Sifakis, as well as other players yet to sign with a club, out of the Greece squad for the recent World Cup Qualifiers against Latvia and Lithuania.

Eventually in September 2012, after the Euro 2012 with Greece national team, Sifakis signed a 1-year contract with Belgian team Charleroi, wearing number 1.

=== Atromitos ===
In the summer of 2013, Sifakis returned to Greece by signing a one-year contract with Atromitos.

In his first interview as a member of the club, he stated that "Atromitos is one of the few teams for which I would have returned to Greece and it is true that only a few days ago I wasn’t even considering it". Furthermore, "The fact that Atromitos is in a phase of development is something which I am very pleased with, especially at a time when everything in our country is going in the other direction".

He made his debut at 17 August against a draw 2–2 with Ergotelis. On 27 May 2014, Atromitos announced the end of his contract, after a year with the club.

=== Levadiakos ===
On 12 September 2014, Sifakis penned a one-year deal with fellow Super League Greece side Levadiakos.

=== Kortrijk ===
The 30-year-old International has signed a two-year-contract with Kortrijk and the Belgian club has officially announced the move. Sifakis, who played for Charleroi during the 2012–2013 season, will have a Greek teammate, as Thanasis Papazoglou has also joined Kortrijk.

On 23 September 2015, he made his debut with the club in a game against K Olsa Brakel for Belgian Cup. Michalis Sifakis made his Belgium Jupiler League debut for Kortrijk on 2 April 2016 in a scoreless draw at home to Royal Mouscron-Péruwelz. On 30 April 2016, he kept the third clean sheet in 5 appearances this season in a game against Standard Liège. He started the 2016–17 Belgian Cup as a starter, while in the 2016–17 Jupiler League was a substitute. On 24 January 2017, he made his debut in the League, in a 3–0 away loss against Genk.

=== Samsunspor ===
On 6 August 2017, Sifakis signed a year contract with TFF First League club Samsunspor. On 10 December 2017, Michalis Sifakis made his league debut for Samsunspor, keeping a clean sheet in a 0–0 draw away to Denizlispor. On 14 May 2018, he mutually solved his contract with the club.

== International career ==
In 2004, Sifakis was called for the Greece national under-21 football team. He played 15 games with the U21 selection. He was member of Greece national team during 2005 FIFA Confederations Cup.

In 2009, Greece's national team coach, Otto Rehhagel, invited Sifakis to help the national team qualify for the South Africa 2010 FIFA World Cup. On 14 October, he contributed to his team's victory against Luxembourg. He was also part of the squad for the final tournament.

Under coach Fernando Santos, Sifakis played most of his country's UEFA Euro 2012 qualifying matches.

Following an injury to regular goalkeeper Kostas Chalkias in Greece' second game of Euro 2012, against the Czech Republic, Sifakis was substituted into the game to replace him and he remained the starting goalkeeper for the rest of the tournament, as Greece reached the Quarter finals of the competition.

== Personal life ==
Michalis Sifakis is the son of former OFI goalkeeper Myron Sifakis, best known for his performance in the 1987 Greek Cup Final, which earned OFI their first and to this date only major trophy. He has two brothers: Vasilis, who is also a goalkeeper and Marios who is a goalkeeper coach.

In June 2018, he married his longtime girlfriend Olga Stefanidi. After six years of marriage they separated. Their divorce was finalized in 2024.

In January 2026 he participated in the 13th season of Survivor Greece. His strong personality and athleticism distinguished him. Although the show was successful, on May 10 after the serious injury of another contestant, the network canceled the show. No winner was declared that season.

== Career statistics ==
Appearances and goals by club, season and competition
Club	Season	League			Cup^{[A]}		Continental^{[B]}		Others^{[C]}		Total	
Club	Season	Division	Apps	Goals	Apps	Goals	Apps	Goals	Apps	Goals	Apps	Goals
OFI	2002–03	Alpha Ethniki	4	0	–		–		–		4	0
OFI	2003–04	Alpha Ethniki	14	0	1	0	–		–		15	0
OFI	2004–05	Alpha Ethniki	27	0	2	0	–		–		29	0
OFI	2005–06	Alpha Ethniki	30	0	1	0	–		–		31	0
OFI	2006–07	Super League Greece	30	0	3	0	–		–		33	0
OFI	Total		105	0	7	0	0	0	0	0	112	0
Olympiacos	2007–08	Super League Greece	2	0	5	0	–		1	0	8	0
Aris	2008–09	Super League Greece	24	0	3	0	–		–		27	0
Aris	2009–10	Super League Greece	30	0	3	0	2	0	–		35	0
Aris	2010–11	Super League Greece	22	0	1	0	12	0	–		35	0
Aris	2011–12	Super League Greece	4	0	–		–		–		4	0
Aris	Total		80	0	7	0	14	0	1	0	102	0
Charleroi	2012–13	Belgian Pro League	10	0	1	0	–		–		11	0
Atromitos	2013–14	Super League Greece	11	0	5	0	1	0	–		17	0
Levadiakos	2014–15	Super League Greece	25	0	0	0	0	0	–		25	0
Kortrijk	2015–16	Belgian Pro League	8	0	3	0	–		–		11	0
Kortrijk	2016–17	Belgian Pro League	8	0	2	0	–		–		10	0
Kortrijk	Total		16	0	5	0	0	0	0	0	21	0
Samsunspor	2017–18	TFF 1. Lig	6	0	1	0	–		–		7	0
Career total			255	0	31	0	15	0	1	0	302	0

== Honours ==
In 2009, the Greek Professional Players Association honored Sifakis with the Fair Play award for his professionalism and ethos, due to his calm and non-violent reaction to a confrontation with a fan in the opening game of the 2009–2010 Greek season away at Iraklis. During the match, Sifakis was approached by an Iraklis fan who had run onto the pitch and began to verbally abuse him. Sifakis did not react and the stewards eventually intervened, removing the fan from the pitch. In the years 2010 and 2011, he was awarded from PSAP as the best goalkeeper in Super League.

Olympiacos

- Super League Greece: 2007–08
- Greek Cup: 2007–08
- Greek Super Cup: 2007

Individual

- Super League Greece best goalkeeper: 2010, 2011
- PSAP fair play: 2009
