= Lefteris Sakellariou =

Greek footballer

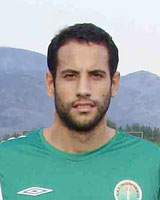

Personal information
- Full name: Eleftherios Sakellariou
- Date of birth: 17 February 1987 (age 39)
- Place of birth: Athens, Greece
- Height: 1.83 m (6 ft 0 in)
- Position: Left-back

Team information
- Current team: Triglia Rafinas

Senior career*
| Years | Team | Apps | (Gls) |
| 2005–2006 | Fostiras | 6 | (0) |
| 2006–2009 | Ethnikos Asteras | 36 | (0) |
| 2009–2010 | Panthrakikos | 16 | (0) |
| 2010–2013 | PAOK | 10 | (0) |
| 2011–2012 | → Kerkyra (loan) | 11 | (0) |
| 2013 | Lyubimets 2007 | 8 | (0) |
| 2014–2015 | Fostiras | 12 | (1) |
| 2015 | Chania | 4 | (0) |
| 2015–2016 | Kissamikos | 9 | (0) |
| 2016–2017 | AEZ Zakakiou | 13 | (1) |
| 2017 | Panelefsiniakos | 4 | (0) |
| 2017– | Triglia Rafinas | 0 | (0) |
- * Club domestic league appearances and goals as of 22 December 2017 (UTC)

Lefteris Sakellariou (Greek: Λευτέρης Σακελλαρίου; born 17 February 1987) is a Greek footballer who plays as a left-back.

== Career ==
=== Senior career ===
==== Early years ====
Sakellariou began his football career in the academy of Panathinaikos, where he stayed for about four years. At age 17, he left Panathinaikos and turned professional at lower division club Fostiras.

==== Ethnikos Asteras ====
After one season at Fostiras, Sakellariou was signed by Football League (second division) side Ethnikos Asteras.

Sakellariou became a regular at Ethnikos Asteras, and after three seasons his performances were good enough to earn him a transfer to the Super League with Panthrakikos.

==== Panthrakikos ====
His first season in the Super League was a personal success, making 16 total starts and establishing himself as one of the league's quality young players, but it was not a successful season for the team, as Panthrakikos was relegated to the Football League. That summer though, Panthrakikos' manager Pavlos Dermitzakis would move to PAOK, and Dermitzakis would bring Sakellariou with him to the prominent Thessaloniki club.

==== PAOK ====
In his first season with PAOK, Sakellariou would make 10 Super League appearances, as well as three appearances in the UEFA Europa League, including a 90-minute performance in a 1–0 win over Villarreal and a 90-minute performance in a 1–1 draw with Club Brugge.

Unfortunately for Sakellariou, Dermitzakis did not last long at PAOK, and Sakellariou would have the same support from PAOK's next managers. Under László Bölöni, Sakellariou would be loaned out to Kerkyra for the 2011–12 season, where he would make 11 Super League appearances, as Kerkyra narrowly avoided relegation.

In 2012–13, Sakellariou remained in PAOK's squad, but could not force his way onto the pitch. In early 2013, PAOK and Sakellariou mutually agreed to terminate their contract, as Sakellariou sought to catch on elsewhere.

==== Lyubimets 2007 ====
In 2013, Sakellariou joined Bulgarian A Group club Lyubimets 2007.

=== Career statistics ===
| season | club | league | Championship | | Nation cup | | Europe cup | | Total | |
| season | club | league | appear | goals | appear | goals | appear | goals | appear | goals |
| 2005–06 | Fostiras | Delta Ethniki | 6 | 0 | | | | | 6 | 0 |
| 2006–07 | Ethnikos Asteras | Beta Ethniki | 13 | 0 | 0 | 0 | 0 | 0 | 13 | 0 |
| 2007–08 | Ethnikos Asteras | Beta Ethniki | 3 | 0 | 0 | 0 | 0 | 0 | 3 | 0 |
| 2008–09 | Ethnikos Asteras | Beta Ethniki | 20 | 0 | 0 | 0 | 0 | 0 | 20 | 0 |
| 2009–10 | Panthrakikos | Super League | 16 | 0 | 1 | 0 | 0 | 0 | 17 | 0 |
| 2010–11 | PAOK | Super League | 10 | 0 | 2 | 0 | 3 | 0 | 15 | 0 |
| 2011–12 | AO Kerkyra | Super League | 11 | 0 | 2 | 0 | 0 | 0 | 13 | 0 |
| 2013–14 | Lyubimets 2007 | A PFG | 8 | 0 | 0 | 0 | 0 | 0 | 8 | 0 |
| Career Total | | | 87 | 0 | 5 | 0 | 3 | 0 | 95 | 0 |

Date of last update: 15 December 2013
