= 2010–11 Super League Greece =

75th season of top-tier football league in Greece

Super League Greece
- Season: 2010–11
- Dates: 27 August 2010 – 25 May 2011
- Champions: Olympiacos; 38th Greek title
- Relegated: Olympiacos Volos; Kavala; AEL; Panserraikos; Iraklis
- Champions League: Olympiacos; Panathinaikos
- Europa League: PAOK; AEK Athens; Olympiacos Volos
- Matches: 240
- Goals: 528 (2.2 per match)
- Top goalscorer: Djibril Cissé (20 goals)
- Biggest home win: Olympiacos 6–0 AEK Athens; Olympiacos 6–0 AEL
- Biggest away win: Aris 0–4 AEK Athens; AEK Athens 0–4 Olympiacos Volos
- Highest scoring: Kerkyra 3–4 Aris

The 2010–11 Super League Greece was the 75th season of the highest football league of Greece and the fifth under the name Super League. The league consisted of 16 teams, the 13 best teams of the 2009–10 season and three teams that had been promoted from the 2009–10 Beta Ethniki.

The season began on 27 August 2010 with the first matches of the regular season and ended on 25 May 2011 with the last matches of the European playoff round. Panathinaikos were the defending champions, having won their 20th Greek championship in the 2009–10 season. The season was marred by Koriopolis, a match-fixing scandal which involved several teams from the top three leagues of Greek football.

== Season overview ==
=== Title race ===
The league was won by Olympiacos, who earned their 38th Greek league title. They finished with a 13-point lead over runners-up Panathinaikos, who had to compete in a play-off round which determined the exact allocation of spots for both European competitions.

Panathinaikos was joined in the play-offs by third-placed club and city rivals AEK Athens, fourth-placed PAOK and fifth-placed Olympiacos Volos. Panathinaikos eventually won the play-off group and thus earned the second Greek spot in the 2011–12 UEFA Champions League. Since AEK had already won the 2010–11 Greek Cup competition a few weeks earlier and thus were already qualified for the 2011–12 UEFA Europa League, both PAOK and Olympiacos Volos were guaranteed a spot in that competition as well.

=== Relegation ===
After thirty matches, the relegation spots were occupied by 14th-placed Asteras Tripolis, 15th-placed AEL and last-placed Panserraikos. However, all three clubs eventually stayed in the league after Iraklis Thessaloniki, Kavala and Olympiacos Volos were demoted by separate sports court decisions.

On 19 May 2011, Iraklis Thessaloniki were denied a licence for the 2011–12 season over unpaid debts and thus demoted to the second-level Football League. Soon afterwards, the Thessaloniki club was found guilty of having forged documents during the winter transfer window and put at the end of the standings.

A few days after the Iraklis verdict, it became evident that several clubs and officials throughout the top leagues of Greek football were involved in a match-fixing scandal. Investigations in the matter were taken all summer. On 28 July 2011, Kavala and Olympiacos Volos were found guilty of having taken part in illegal actions and were therefore demoted to the Football League. However, both clubs appealed to the decision and they stayed in the Super League Greece, though they were deducted 8 and 10 points respectively. On 11 August 2011, UEFA disqualified Olympiacos Volos from further participation in the UEFA Europa League. On 23 August 2011, the Professional Sports Committee stripped Kavala and Olympiacos Volos of their professional licence due to their chairmen's involvement in the scandal.

== Teams ==
Levadiakos, PAS Giannina and Panthrakikos had been relegated at the end of the 2009–10 season after finishing in the bottom three places of the league table. Levadiakos concluded a four-year run in the highest football league of Greece. Panthrakikos finished a two-year tenure with the league, while PAS Giannina had to return to the Football League, formerly known as Beta Ethniki, after just one season.

The three relegated teams were replaced by 2009–10 Beta Ethniki champions Olympiacos Volos, runners-up Kerkyra and promotion playoff winners Panserraikos. Olympiacos Volos returned to the Greek top football level after 20 seasons. Kerkyra ended a three-year absence from the Super League, while Panserraikos immediately returned to the league.

Promoted from 2009–10 Beta Ethniki	Relegated from 2009–10 Super League Greece
Olympiacos Volos; Kerkyra; Panserraikos	Levadiakos; PAS Giannina; Panthrakikos

=== Stadiums and locations ===
Location of the 2010–11 Super League Greece teams

Club	Location	Venue	Capacity	2009–10
AEK Athens	Athens (Marousi)	Athens Olympic Stadium	69,638	3rd
AEL	Larissa	AEL FC Arena (Note: AEL moved to AEL FC Arena upon its completion in December 2010. Previous matches were hosted at Alcazar Stadium)	17,118	8th
Aris	Thessaloniki (Charilaou)	Kleanthis Vikelidis Stadium	22,800	4th
Asteras Tripolis	Tripoli	Asteras Tripolis Stadium	6,430	12th
Atromitos	Athens (Peristeri)	Peristeri Stadium	8,939	7th
Ergotelis	Heraklion	Pankritio Stadium	26,240	11th
Iraklis	Thessaloniki (Triandria)	Kaftanzoglio Stadium	27,560	10th
Kavala	Kavala	Anthi Karagianni Stadium	12,500	6th
Kerkyra	Corfu	Kerkyra Stadium	2,685	2nd (BE)
Olympiacos	Piraeus	Karaiskakis Stadium	33,334	5th
Olympiacos Volos	Volos	Panthessaliko Stadium	22,700	1st (BE)
Panathinaikos	Athens (Marousi)	Athens Olympic Stadium	69,638	1st
Panionios	Athens (Nea Smyrni)	Nea Smyrni Stadium	11,700	9th
Panserraikos	Serres	Serres Municipal Stadium	9,500	3rd (BE)
PAOK	Thessaloniki (Toumba)	Toumba Stadium	28,703	2nd
Skoda Xanthi	Xanthi	Skoda Xanthi Arena	7,361	13rd

=== Personnel and kits ===
Team	Manager	Captain	Kit manufacturer	Shirt sponsor
AEK Athens	(Spain) Manolo Jiménez	(Greece) Pantelis Kafes	Puma	Κino
AEL	(Greece) Nikos Kostenoglou	(Greece) Nikos Dabizas	Adidas	Pame Stoixima
Aris	(Greece) Sakis Tsiolis	(Greece) Michalis Sifakis	Under Armour	Κino
Asteras Tripolis	(Greece) Pavlos Dermitzakis	(Argentina) Adrián Bastía	Lotto	Lotto
Atromitos	(Greece) Georgios Donis	(Greece) Konstantinos Nebegleras	Asics	Lotto
Ergotelis	(Greece) Nikos Karageorgiou	(Brazil) Silva Júnior	Lotto	Lotto
Iraklis	(Greece) Georgios Paraschos	(Greece) Anastasios Katsabis	Legea	Tzoker
Kavala	(Greece) Giannis Mantzourakis	(Ivory Coast) Serge Dié	Puma	Extra 5
Kerkyra	(Montenegro) Božidar Bandović	(Greece) Ieroklis Stoltidis	Puma	Tzoker
Olympiacos	(Spain) Ernesto Valverde	(Greece) Antonios Nikopolidis	Puma	Pame Stoixima
Olympiacos Volos	(Greece) Makis Katsavakis	(Argentina) Leandro Álvarez	Puma	ProPo
Panathinaikos	(Portugal) Jesualdo Ferreira	(Greece) Giorgos Karagounis	Adidas	Cosmote
Panionios	(Greece) Takis Lemonis	(Greece) Fanouris Goundoulakis	Diadora	Attica Bank
Panserraikos	(Greece) Pavlos Dimitriou	(Greece) Anastasios Papazoglou	Mass Sport	Proto
PAOK	(Greece) Makis Chavos	(Greece) Kostas Chalkias	Puma	Pame Stoixima
Skoda Xanthi	(Greece) Nikos Papadopoulos	(Greece) Konstantinos Fliskas	Nike	Emporiki Bank

=== Managerial changes ===
Team	Outgoing manager	Date of vacancy	Position in table	Incoming manager	Date of appointment
Skoda Xanthi	(Greece) Nikos Kechagias	20 September 2010	14th	(Greece) Georgios Paraschos	20 September 2010
AEK Athens	(Bosnia and Herzegovina) Dušan Bajević	26 September 2010	13th	(Albania) Bledar Kola (caretaker)	26 September 2010
AEK Athens	(Albania) Bledar Kola (caretaker)	8 October 2010	7th	(Spain) Manolo Jiménez	8 October 2010
PAOK	(Greece) Pavlos Dermitzakis	17 October 2010	12th	(Greece) Makis Chavos	18 October 2010
Panionios	(Sweden) Mikael Stahre	28 October 2010	15th	(Greece) Akis Mantzios (caretaker)	28 October 2010
Skoda Xanthi	(Greece) Georgios Paraschos	8 November 2010	15th	(Greece) Nikos Papadopoulos	14 November 2010
Panionios	(Greece) Akis Mantzios (caretaker)	7 November 2010	16th	(Greece) Georgios Paraschos	8 November 2010
Panathinaikos	(Greece) Nikos Nioplias	15 November 2010	2nd	(Poland) Jacek Gmoch (caretaker)	15 November 2010
Kavala	(Serbia) Dragan Okuka	16 November 2010	5th	(Poland) Henryk Kasperczak	17 November 2010
Panionios	(Greece) Georgios Paraschos	17 November 2010	16th	(Greece) Akis Mantzios (caretaker)	17 November 2010
Panathinaikos	(Poland) Jacek Gmoch (caretaker)	20 November 2010	2nd	(Portugal) Jesualdo Ferreira	21 November 2010
AEL	(Greece) Giannis Papakostas	29 November 2010	16th	(Greece) Kostas Katsaras (caretaker)	30 November 2010
Kerkyra	(Greece) Babis Tennes	30 November 2010	13th	(Montenegro) Božidar Bandović	30 November 2010
Panionios	(Greece) Akis Mantzios (caretaker)	9 December 2010	15th	(Greece) Takis Lemonis	10 December 2010
AEL	(Greece) Kostas Katsaras (caretaker)	16 December 2010	16th	(Norway) Jorn Andersen	17 December 2010
AEL	(Norway) Jorn Andersen	9 January 2011	16th	(Greece) Nikos Kostenoglou	10 January 2011
Asteras Tripolis	(Greece) Vangelis Vlachos	17 January 2011	13th	(Greece) Pavlos Dermitzakis	21 January 2011
Aris	(Argentina) Héctor Cúper	18 January 2011	10th	(Greece) Giannis Michalitsos	19 January 2011
Aris	(Greece) Giannis Michalitsos	7 March 2011	11th	(Greece) Sakis Tsiolis	11 March 2011

== Regular season ==
=== League table ===
Pos	Team	Pld	W	D	L	GF	GA	GD	Pts	Qualification or relegation
1	Olympiacos (C)	30	24	1	5	65	18	+47	73	Qualification for the Champions League group stage
2	Panathinaikos	30	18	6	6	47	26	+21	60	Qualification for the Play-offs
3	AEK Athens	30	15	5	10	46	37	+9	50	Qualification for the Play-offs
4	PAOK	30	14	6	10	32	29	+3	48	Qualification for the Play-offs
5	Olympiacos Volos (Note: On 28 July 2011, the Disciplinary Committee of the competition found Olympiacos Volos and Kavala guilty of match-fixing. Therefore the clubs were automatically put at the end of the league table and demoted to the Football League. The decision, however, was lifted on 10 August 2011 after both appealed. Instead of that Olympiacos Volos had 10 points deducted and Kavala 8 for the 2011-2012 season. On 23 August 2011, the Professional Sports Committee stripped Kavala and Olympiacos Volos of their professional licence, due to their chairmen's involvement in the match fixing scandal.) (D)	30	12	11	7	40	28	+12	47	Play-offs and relegation to the Delta Ethniki
6	Aris	30	13	6	11	29	29	0	45	
7	Kavala (D)	30	10	10	10	29	27	+2	40	Relegation to the Delta Ethniki
8	Ergotelis	30	11	6	13	32	38	−6	39	
9	Skoda Xanthi	30	9	9	12	29	35	−6	36	
10	Panionios	30	8	11	11	25	35	−10	35	
11	Atromitos	30	7	13	10	30	34	−4	34	
12	Kerkyra	30	9	6	15	30	40	−10	33	
13	Asteras Tripolis	30	7	10	13	21	29	−8	31	
14	AEL (R)	30	5	10	15	29	47	−18	25	Relegation to the Football League
15	Panserraikos (R)	30	6	6	18	22	48	−26	24	Relegation to the Football League
16	Iraklis (R)	30	7	14	9	22	28	−6	35	Relegation to the Football League 2 (Note: On 19 May 2011, the Disciplinary Committee of the competition found Iraklis guilty of forgery during the winter transfer window. Therefore the club was automatically put at the end of the league table and demoted to the Football League.)

Source: Super League Greece
Rules for classification: 1) Points; 2) Head-to-head points; 3) Head-to-head goal difference; 4) Play-offs (neutral ground); 7) Draw.
(Note: Criterion 4 is only used if needed to decide champion, teams for relegation or teams for UEFA competitions).
(C) Champions; (D) Disqualified; (R) Relegated

=== Results ===
Home \ Away	AEK	AEL	ARIS	AST	ATR	ERG	IRA	KAV	KER	OLY	OLV	PAO	PGSS	PNS	PAOK	XAN
AEK Athens		4–0	1–2	2–2	1–0	3–1	0–0	1–0	0–0	1–0	0–4	1–0	1–1	2–0	4–0	1–0
AEL	2–3		2–2	0–2	1–0	3–3	2–1	0–0	1–1	0–1	1–2	2–0	0–1	2–1	1–2	3–0
Aris	0–4	1–1		1–0	2–0	1–0	0–1	1–0	2–0	1–2	2–1	0–1	0–2	3–1	0–0	0–2
Asteras Tripolis	0–3	1–1	1–2		1–1	3–0	0–0	0–1	0–2	0–1	2–1	0–0	3–1	0–2	0–0	1–2
Atromitos	1–1	3–0	0–0	0–0		1–1	1–1	0–0	4–2	3–1	2–2	0–1	1–2	2–1	2–2	1–1
Ergotelis	2–3	2–1	0–0	0–1	1–1		1–0	2–1	3–0	0–2 (Note: The match, originally scheduled on 13 November 2010, was suspended at half time due to heavy rain. The remaining minutes were completed on 24 November 2010.)	0–0	1–4	2–0	2–0	1–2	1–0
Iraklis	2–0	1–0	1–0	0–0	1–0	1–1		0–1	0–0	2–1	0–0	1–3	1–1	1–1	0–0	1–1
Kavala	2–1	1–0	0–1	1–0	1–1	3–1	3–0		1–0	0–1	0–1	2–2	2–1	0–0	0–1	1–1
Kerkyra	2–1	1–0	3–4	1–2	3–1	1–0	0–0	1–1		0–2	1–3	0–2	1–2	3–0	2–1	1–1
Olympiacos	6–0	6–0	1–0	3–0	2–1	3–0	2–0	3–1	2–0		3–1	2–1	5–0	4–2	3–0	1–0
Olympiacos Volos	3–1	1–1	1–1	1–1	2–0	0–1	1–1	1–1	1–0	0–1		3–2	0–0	3–0	0–3	3–0
Panathinaikos	3–1	1–1	1–0	1–0	1–1	2–0	4–2	4–2	2–1	2–1	0–1		2–1	2–0	1–0	1–1
Panionios	1–0	3–3	1–0	0–0	0–1	0–1	1–0	1–1	0–1	1–1	0–1	1–1		0–0	1–0	0–2
Panserraikos	1–3	1–0	1–0	0–1	0–1	0–4	1–2	1–0	0–2	0–1	2–2	1–0	1–1		1–1	2–1
PAOK	2–1	1–0	0–1	1–0	0–1	2–0	1–0	0–2	2–0	2–1	1–1	0–1	3–1	3–2		2–1
Skoda Xanthi	0–2	1–1	1–2	1–0	3–0	0–1	2–2	1–1	2–1	0–3	1–0	0–2	1–1	2–0	1–0	

Source: Super League Greece
Legend: Blue = home team win; Yellow = draw; Red = away team win.

== Play-offs ==
In the play-off for Champions League, the four teams play each other in a home and away round robin. However, they do not all start with 0 points. Instead, a weighting system applies to the teams' standing at the start of the play-off mini-league. The team finishing fifth in the Super League will start the play-off with 0 points. The fifth placed team's end of season tally of points is subtracted from the sum of the points that other teams have. This number is then divided by five and rounded to the nearest whole number of points, if necessary, to give the other teams the points with which they start the mini-league.

Fifth-placed club Olympiacos Volos earned 47 points during the regular season. Based on this number and the calculations above, Panathinaikos as runners-up will began the play-offs with three points ((60–47)/5 = 2.6, rounded up to 3), while AEK Athens started with one point ((50–47)/5 = 0.6, rounded up to 1) and PAOK with no points ((48–47)/5 = 0.2, rounded down to 0).

Pos	Team	Pld	W	D	L	GF	GA	GD	Pts	Qualification	PAO	PAOK	AEK	OLV
2	Panathinaikos	6	3	1	2	9	5	+4	13	Qualification for the Champions League third qualifying round		1–0	1–1	3–0
3	PAOK	6	4	0	2	11	8	+3	12	Qualification for the Europa League third qualifying round	2–1		2–1	5–1
4	AEK Athens	6	2	1	3	6	6	0	8	Qualification for the Europa League play-off round (Note: AEK Athens have won the 2010–11 Greek Football Cup and are therefore qualified for the playoff round of the 2011–12 UEFA Europa League. As a consequence, the fourth-placed team of this group also entered the Europa League.)	0–2	3–0		1–0
5	Olympiacos Volos	6	2	0	4	5	12	−7	6	Qualification for the Europa League second qualifying round	2–1	1–2	1–0	

Source: Super League Greece: Standings and Schedule
Legend: Blue = home team win; Yellow = draw; Red = away team win.
Rules for classification: 1) points; 2) head-to-head points; 3) head-to-head goal difference; 4) head-to-head goals scored; 5) goal difference; 6) number of goals scored.

== Season statistics ==
=== Top scorers ===
Including matches played on 17 April 2011; Source: Soccerway

Rank	Player	Club	Goals
1	(France) Djibril Cissé	Panathinaikos	20
2	(Belgium) Kevin Mirallas	Olympiacos	14
3	(Spain) David Fuster	Olympiacos	13
4	(Algeria) Rafik Djebbour	AEK Athens / Olympiacos	12
5	(Nigeria) Benjamin Onwuachi	Kavala	10
6	(Argentina) Ismael Blanco	AEK Athens	9
6	(Germany) Denis Epstein	Kerkyra	9
6	(Germany) Kostas Mitroglou	Olympiacos / Panionios	9
6	(Serbia) Marko Pantelić	Olympiacos	9
6	(Argentina) Ignacio Scocco	AEK Athens	9

=== Top assists ===
Rank	Player	Club	Assists
1	(Algeria) Djamel Abdoun	Kavala	8
1	(Argentina) Javier Umbides	Olympiacos Volos	8
1	(Spain) Albert Riera	Olympiacos	8
4	(Greece) Kostas Katsouranis	Panathinaikos	6
4	(France) Djibril Cissé	Panathinaikos	6
4	(Argentina) Ariel Ibagaza	Olympiacos	6

== Awards ==
=== MVP and Best Goal Awards ===
Matchday	MVP	Best Goal	Ref
1st	(Argentina) Vicente Monje (Olympiacos Volos)	(Greece) Athanasios Tsigas (Kerkyra)	
2nd	(Spain) Albert Riera (Olympiacos)	(Greece) Nikos Liberopoulos (AEK Athens)	
3rd	(Algeria) Djamel Abdoun (Kavala)	(Argentina) Ignacio Scocco (AEK Athens)	
4th	(Argentina) Javier Umbides (Olympiacos Volos)	(Spain) David Fuster (Olympiacos)	
5th	(Spain) Javito (Aris)	(Brazil) Leonardo (AEK Athens)	
6th	(Argentina) Ignacio Scocco (AEK Athens)		
7th	(Greece) Dimitris Salpingidis (PAOK)	(French Guiana) Jean-Claude Darcheville (Kavala)	
8th	(France) Djibril Cissé (Panathinaikos)	(Greece) Nikolaos Lazaridis (Aris)	
9th	(Belgium) Kevin Mirallas (Olympiacos)		
10th	(Greece) Andreas Tatos (Atromitos)	(Gabon) Daniel Cousin (AEL)	
11th	(Algeria) Djamel Abdoun (Kavala)	(Brazil) Marcelinho (Skoda Xanthi)	
12th	(Greece) Andreas Tatos (Atromitos)	(Greece) Kostas Kapetanos (Olympiacos Volos)	
13th	(Chile) Pablo Contreras (PAOK)	(Uruguay) Pablo Lima (Iraklis)	
14th	(Uruguay) Pablo García (PAOK)	(Brazil) Neto (Aris)	
15th	(Greece) Dimitrios Souanis (Skoda Xanthi)	(Greece) Manolis Papasterianos (Iraklis)	
16th	(Germany) Ivica Majstorović (Kerkyra)	(France) Djibril Cissé (Panathinaikos)	
17th	(Greece) Sotiris Ninis (Panathinaikos)	(Ivory Coast) Serge Dié (Kavala)	
18th	(Greece) Kostas Mitroglou (Panionios)	(Spain) Albert Riera (Olympiacos)	
19th	(Greece) Ilias Anastasakos (Atromitos)	(Nigeria) Benjamin Onwuachi (Kavala)	
20th	(Brazil) Leonardo (AEK Athens)	(Greece) Nikos Liberopoulos (AEK Athens)	
21st	(Greece) Alexandros Tzorvas (Panathinaikos)	(Greece) Sotiris Ninis (Panathinaikos)	
22nd	(France) Djibril Cissé (Panathinaikos)	(Brazil) Gustavinho (Olympiacos)	
23rd	(Belgium) Kevin Mirallas (Olympiacos)	(Greece) Kostas Kapetanos (Olympiacos Volos)	
24th	(Algeria) Djamel Abdoun (Kavala)	(Romania) Marius Niculae (Kavala)	
25th	(Argentina) Ignacio Scocco (AEK Athens)	(Slovakia) Mário Breška (Olympiacos Volos)	
26th	(Spain) Vitolo (PAOK)	(Greece) Antonis Petropoulos (Panathinaikos)	
27th	(Greece) Stelios Sfakianakis (Atromitos)	(Greece) Lazaros Christodoulopoulos (Panathinaikos)	
28th	(Greece) Dimitrios Siovas (Panionios)	(Greece) Georgios Georgiadis (Panserraikos)	
29th	(Greece) Christos Kalantzis ( Kerkyra)	(Brazil) Neto (Aris)	
30th	(Greece) Antonios Nikopolidis (Olympiacos)	(Slovakia) Mário Breška (Olympiacos Volos)	

=== Annual awards ===
Annual awards were announced on 18 January 2012

Award	Winner	Club
Greek Player of the Season	(Greece) Avram Papadopoulos	Olympiacos
Foreign Player of the Season	(Portugal) Vieirinha	PAOK
Young Player of the Season	(Greece) Giannis Fetfatzidis	Olympiacos
Goalkeeper of the Season	(Greece) Michalis Sifakis	Aris
Golden Boot	(France) Djibril Cissé	Panathinaikos
Manager of the Season	(Spain) Ernesto Valverde	Olympiacos

== Attendances ==
Olympiacos drew the highest average home attendance in the 2010–11 edition of the Super League Greece.

#	Team	Average attendance
1	Olympiacos	22,099
2	Panathinaikos	16,608
3	PAOK	12,853
4	Aris	9,333
5	AEK Athens	9,271
6	Olympiacos Volos	6,289
7	AEL	5,165
8	Iraklis	2,992
9	Panionios	2,766
10	Asteras Tripolis	2,442
11	Panserraikos	2,257
12	Kavala	1,992
13	Skoda Xanthi	1,975
14	Atromitos	1,930
15	Ergotelis	1,731
16	Kerkyra	1,234
