= Manolo Jiménez (footballer, born 1964) =

Spanish football manager

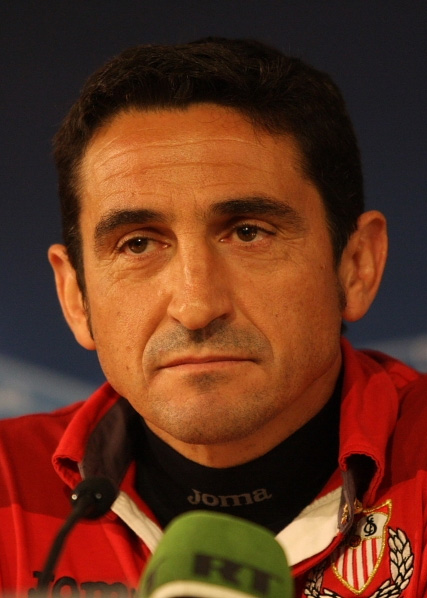
- Jiménez as manager of Sevilla in 2010

Personal information
- Full name: Manuel Jiménez Jiménez
- Date of birth: 26 January 1964 (age 62)
- Place of birth: Arahal, Spain
- Height: 1.78 m (5 ft 10 in)
- Position: Left-back

Youth career
- Sevilla

Senior career*
Years	Team	Apps	(Gls)
1981–1984	Sevilla B		
1984–1997	Sevilla	354	(1)
1997–1998	Jaén	9	(0)
Total		363	(1)

International career
1986	Spain U21	1	(0)
1988	Spain U23	1	(0)
1988–1990	Spain	15	(0)

Managerial career
- 2000–2007: Sevilla B
- 2007–2010: Sevilla
- 2010–2011: AEK Athens
- 2011–2013: Zaragoza
- 2013–2015: Al-Rayyan
- 2017–2018: AEK Athens
- 2018: Las Palmas
- 2019: AEK Athens
- 2019–2020: Al Wahda
- 2020–2021: AEK Athens
- 2022–2023: Al Wahda
- 2024: Cerro Porteño
- 2024–2025: APOEL
- 2025–2026: Aris
- * Club domestic league appearances and goals

Manuel "Manolo" Jiménez Jiménez (Spanish pronunciation: [maˈnolo xiˈmeneθ]; born 26 January 1964) is a Spanish former professional footballer who played as a left-back, currently a manager.

His career was intimately connected with Sevilla as both a player and manager, and he competed solely in La Liga with the club in the former capacity. He represented Spain at the 1990 World Cup.

As a coach, Jiménez had four spells at AEK Athens in the Super League Greece. Abroad, he also worked with Al-Rayyan and Al Wahda.

== Playing career ==
Jiménez was born in Arahal, Province of Seville. He made his La Liga debut for Sevilla in 1983–84, and went on to make 413 competitive appearances over 14 seasons with his hometown club. He retired in June 1998 at the age of 34, after spending one year with neighbours Real Jaén in the Segunda División.

Jiménez earned 15 caps for the Spain national team. He made his international debut on 12 October 1988 in a 1–1 friendly draw with Argentina played in Seville, and was selected for the 1990 FIFA World Cup squad, appearing against Uruguay in the group stage (0–0) and against Yugoslavia in the round of 16 (2–1 loss).

== Coaching career ==
=== Sevilla ===
For seven seasons, Jiménez was the coach of Sevilla's reserves Sevilla Atlético, leading them to the second tier in 2006–07. On 27 October 2007, following the resignation of Juande Ramos, he was appointed manager of the main squad, initially until the end of the campaign. He guided the Andalusians to fifth place, finishing third in 2008–09 with a subsequent return to the UEFA Champions League.

Jiménez took the team to the final of the Copa del Rey in 2010, notably beating Pep Guardiola's Barcelona in the last-16 stage on the away goals rule. On 24 March 2010, however, after a 1–1 home draw to bottom-placed Xerez, he was dismissed following three draws – all at home – and two losses in the last five league matches, also having been eliminated from the Champions League in the round of 16.

=== AEK Athens ===
On 7 October 2010, Jiménez took over from the sacked Dušan Bajević at AEK Athens, agreeing to a two-year deal. His first game took place ten days later, a 4–0 Super League Greece win at Aris Thessaloniki.

After losing in the UEFA Europa League against Anderlecht (3–0, away), Jiménez achieved his second league win, against Panathinaikos. The side eventually finished 23 points behind champions Olympiacos in third place in the league.

Jiménez won his second trophy as a manager on 30 April 2011, after a 3–0 defeat of Atromitos in the final of the Greek Cup. On 5 October, he left the club by mutual consent; he had been nicknamed "Papatzis" by local newspapers in a reference to the shell game, because of his frequent tactical changes.

=== Zaragoza ===
Jiménez was appointed head coach of Real Zaragoza on 31 December 2011, replacing the fired Javier Aguirre. He was relieved of his duties at the end of the 2012–13 season, as the Aragonese were relegated to division two after four years.

=== Al-Rayyan ===
On 4 November 2013, Jiménez signed with Al-Rayyan. They were relegated from the Qatar Stars League in his debut season, but achieved promotion the following year.

Jiménez's contract was terminated on 20 May 2015.

=== Return to AEK ===
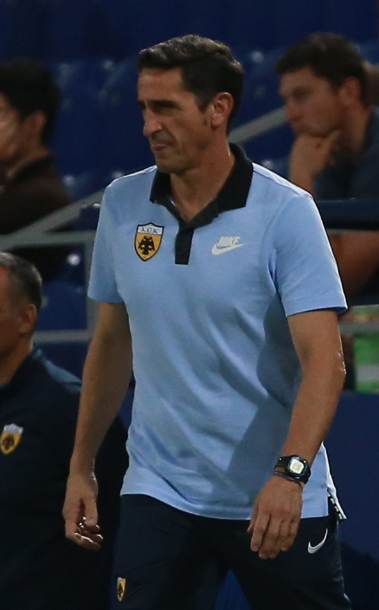
Jiménez with AEK Athens in 2017

Jiménez returned to AEK on 19 January 2017, succeeding José Morais who had resigned the previous day; he signed a deal until the end of the season, extendable by one year subject to satisfactory performance in domestic competitions. He oversaw the team's qualification to the group stage of a European competition on 24 August (after a six-year absence), following a 3–0 home win against Club Brugge in the Europa League play-off round.

At the end of the 2017–18 campaign, the club won the national championship for the first time in 24 years. He left the Olympic Stadium on 25 May 2018 at the end of his contract, however, after negotiations for its renewal proved unsuccessful.

=== Las Palmas ===
The same day, Jiménez agreed on a return to Spain and was appointed manager at Las Palmas, who had been relegated from the top flight the previous season. On 16 November, he was dismissed.

=== AEK again, Al Wahda and journeyman ===
On 5 February 2019, Jiménez returned to AEK Athens for a third spell. In October, he switched to the UAE Pro League with Al Wahda.

Jiménez returned to AEK for the fourth time on 27 December 2020, on an 18-month deal. He was ousted at the end of the season, as they hired Vladan Milojević in his place.

In October 2022, Jiménez went back to Al Wahda. One year later, he was named advisor at Paraguayan Primera División club Cerro Porteño; five months after arriving, he was appointed head coach of the latter.

Jiménez was one of three managers in charge of Cypriot First Division's APOEL in the 2024–25 campaign, after David Gallego and José Dominguez. On 10 September 2025, he returned to the Greek top division with Aris.

== Managerial statistics ==
As of match played on 22 February 2026

Managerial record by team and tenure
Team	From	To	Record							
Team	From	To	G	W	D	L	GF	GA	GD	Win %
Sevilla B	1 July 2000	27 October 2007	297	139	88	70	388	225	+163	46.80
Sevilla	27 October 2007	23 March 2010	136	74	22	40	228	147	+81	54.41
AEK Athens	7 October 2010	5 October 2011	52	26	8	18	79	65	+14	50.00
Zaragoza	31 December 2011	10 June 2013	66	22	11	33	65	98	−33	33.33
Al-Rayyan	4 November 2013	20 May 2015	56	29	12	15	142	66	+76	51.79
AEK Athens	19 January 2017	25 May 2018	79	47	21	11	130	42	+88	59.49
Las Palmas	26 May 2018	16 November 2018	15	5	7	3	20	14	+6	33.33
AEK Athens	6 February 2019	27 May 2019	16	10	2	4	27	12	+15	62.50
Al Wahda	19 October 2019	18 July 2020	23	12	4	7	35	35	+0	52.17
AEK Athens	27 December 2020	25 May 2021	30	12	6	12	38	40	−2	40.00
Al Wahda	4 October 2022	12 March 2023	18	10	6	2	29	17	+12	55.56
Cerro Porteño	19 March 2024	30 September 2024	34	17	9	8	50	28	+22	50.00
APOEL	12 October 2024	2 March 2025	27	12	8	7	54	28	+26	44.44
Aris	10 September 2025	24 February 2026	26	9	11	6	25	25	+0	34.62
Total			875	424	215	236	1,310	842	+468	48.46

== Honours ==
=== Manager ===
Sevilla B

- Segunda División B: 2006–07

AEK Athens

- Super League Greece: 2017–18
- Greek Football Cup: 2010–11

Al-Rayyan

- Qatari Second Division: 2014–15

=== Individual ===
- Super League Greece Manager of the Season: 2017–18
