= Pavlos Dermitzakis =

Greek footballer & manager (born 1969)

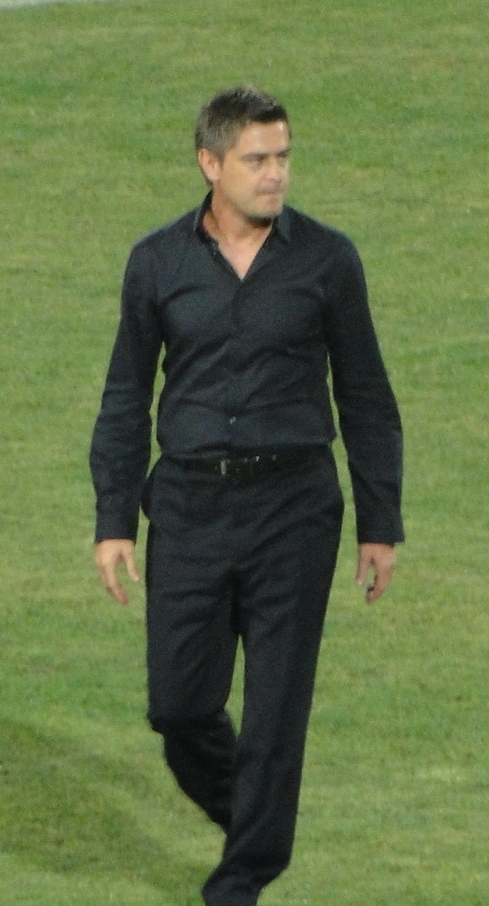

Personal information
- Date of birth: 29 June 1969 (age 57)
- Place of birth: Kavala, Greece
- Height: 1.87 m (6 ft 2 in)
- Position: Forward

Team information
- Current team: Punjab (head coach)

Senior career*
Years	Team	Apps	(Gls)
1987–1992	Kavala	160	(64)
1992–1994	PAOK	60	(26)
1994–1995	Athinaikos	38	(12)
1995–1996	Kalamata	32	(18)
1996–1997	Ergotelis	36	(14)
1997–1998	Panegialios	34	(16)
1998–1999	E.A Rethimniakou	32	(15)
1999–2000	Anagennisi Karditsa	38	(10)
2000–2001	Atromitos	36	(15)
2001–2002	Ergotelis	34	(20)
Total		500	(210)

Managerial career
- 2002–2003: Ergotelis
- 2003–2007: Atsalenios
- 2007–2008: Diagoras
- 2008–2009: Panthrakikos
- 2009–2010: PAOK
- 2011–2012: Asteras Tripolis
- 2012–2013: Panthrakikos
- 2013–2014: OFI
- 2014–2015: Ergotelis
- 2015–2016: Lamia
- 2016–2018: Ermis Aradippou
- 2018–2020: Kavala
- 2020–2022: Veria
- 2022–2023: Panserraikos
- 2023–2024: AEL
- 2024–2025: Iraklis
- 2025–2026: Panionios
- 2026–: Punjab
- * Club domestic league appearances and goals as of 13 May 2025

Pavlos Dermitzakis (Greek: Παύλος Δερμιτζάκης; born 29 June 1969) is a Greek professional football manager and former player who is currently the head coach of Indian Super League club Punjab.

== Playing career ==
Dermitzakis began his football career in Kavala, playing for amateur local side Vyron Kavala. In 1987, he was acquired by the city's most prestigious club Kavala, where he played for five years in both the second and third tiers of the Greek football league system, and scoring a total of 47 goals.

In 1992, Dermitzakis joined Alpha Ethniki side PAOK, where he spent the next three years of his career. In his last season with PAOK, he was not among coach Arie Haan's first choices, and as a result, his playing time was severely limited. He made a total of 4 league appearances for PAOK during the 1994–95 Alpha Ethniki and another 4 in the Cup. He subsequently moved to fellow top-tier side Athinaikos for the first half of the 1995–96 season, followed by Kalamata for the second half, recording 9 and 13 caps for each side respectively.

In the following years, Dermitzakis spent the remainder of his career on season-long contracts with various clubs playing in the Beta and Gamma Ethniki, consecutively signing with Ergotelis, Panegialios, EAR, Anagennisi Karditsa, and Atromitos Athens and back to Ergotelis, until his retirement in 2001 to pursue a managerial career. During his 13-year professional career, Dermitzakis made a total of 327 caps and scored 106 goals across all three professional divisions of the Greek football league system.

== Managerial career ==
Dermitzakis began his managerial career at Ergotelis, at the time playing in the Delta Ethniki, succeeding Myron Sifakis. He then moved to fellow Delta Ethniki Heraklion-based club Atsalenios, whom he also managed to promote to the Gamma Ethniki, this time as champions of Group 10. Dermitzakis cemented his post in Atsalenios, maintaining an undefeated home record during the 2005−06 and 2006−07 seasons in which the club finished in 4th and 3rd place respectively, narrowly missing out on promotion to the Beta Ethniki.

After his departure from Atsalenios in 2007, Dermitzakis moved to fellow Gamma Ethniki club Diagoras, achieving promotion to the Beta Ethniki as champions of the Southern Group, once again achieving an undefeated home record for the Rhodes-based club. He managed the club in the Beta Ethniki until 30 November 2009, when he resigned from his post to take over management of Super League side Panthrakikos. Although Panthrakikos had already failed to avoid relegation when Dermitzakis took over, he managed to improve the Thracians performance and led the club to its first victories in the 2009−10 Super League season.

In the summer of 2010, Dermitzakis was rumored to take over management of PAOK, who instead appointed Mario Beretta as head coach for the club. Dermitzakis eventually replaced Beretta after his sacking in pre-season, but he was himself also fired a few months later on 17 October 2010, after three consecutive losses vs. Skoda Xanthi, fierce club rival Aris and Panathinaikos. On 21 January 2011, Dermitzakis agreed to take over fellow Super League club Asteras Tripolis, but in May 2011 his contract was terminated on mutual consent.

On 31 October 2012 Dermitzakis returned to Panthrakikos once again in the Supere League, again faced with difficult odds as he took over management with just six points on the Table after 8 match-days. Despite the odds, he did not only manage to stay clear of relegation, but also achieved the best ever finish of the club in the competition (10th place). He additionally managed to reach the Greek Cup Semi-Finals, where Panthrakikos were eventually eliminated by competition winners Olympiacos.

In 2013, Dermitzakis returned to Crete and briefly served as manager of Super League club OFI. In September 2014 he returned to the club where he first started his managerial career, taking over management of Ergotelis also in the Super League. However, he failed to improve Ergotelis' position in the League Table after replacing Spanish manager Juan Ferrando, and therefore the club terminated his contract three months later, in December 2014.

In January 2015, Dermitzakis was appointed manager of Football League side Lamia. He left the club shortly after, in March. In the summer of the same year, Dermitzakis moved to Cyprus and was hired by First Division club Ermis Aradippou. His contract was terminated in September, when the club's board of directors felt he did not meet club expectations.

In July 2020, Dermitzakis was appointed manager of Football League side Veria. Veria was crowned champion under Dermitzakis management for two consecutive seasons as they finished first in 2020–21 Football League winning promotion to Super League 2 where again they finished 1st in the 2021–22 Super League 2 North Group but failed to win promotion through the play off games twice against Leviadiakos and Lamia. His contract expired on 30 June 2022 and the new club board decided not to renew his contract.

In November 2022, Dermitzakis was appointed manager of Panserraikos F.C. which were playing in Super League Greece 2, after Greek international goalkeeper Dimitris Eleftheropoulos was fired after three games. Dermitzakis held this role for only one season. The club was at 7th place at the beginning of his lead, and eventually accumulated a 10 point lead by January. They played in that year’s Greek Football Cup, losing to eventual Double winners, AEK Athens.

With three matchdays at hand, Panserraikos clinched the North Group title and the long-awaited participation in the Super League for the first time in 12 years at their home ground with a 3–1 win over Dermitzakis' former club Diagoras. The next three matchdays were not won by Panserraikos because of their already acquired status and at the end of the season, Panserraikos lifted the Super League Greece 2 trophy as champions of the North Group and Dermitzakis and his players received a heroes' welcome back at the city of Serres. In spite of the blossoming success as Panserraikos manager, in July 2023, after a lot of speculation, he terminated his contract with the club on mutual consent. He was succeeded by Pablo García. In September 2024 it was announced his role as coach of AEL has come to an end with a record of 17 wins, 12 draws and three losses in a total of 32 matches.

== Managerial statistics ==
Team	From	To	Record				
Team	From	To	G	W	D	L	Win %
Ergotelis	1 July 2002	30 June 2003					
Atsalenios	1 July 2003	30 June 2007	145	60	40	45	41.38
Diagoras	1 July 2007	1 December 2009	85	40	17	28	47.06
Panthrakikos	12 January 2009	22 July 2010	12	3	1	8	25.00
PAOK	23 July 2010	17 October 2011	12	3	6	3	25.00
Asteras Tripolis	21 January 2011	17 May 2012	10	3	1	6	30.00
Panthrakikos	31 October 2012	30 April 2013	30	12	8	10	40.00
OFI	16 May 2013	8 October 2014	8	1	5	2	12.50
Ergotelis	4 September 2014	15 December 2015	13	1	5	7	7.69
Lamia	28 January 2015	28 March 2016	11	4	4	3	36.36
Ermis Aradippou	1 July 2016	3 September 2017	2	0	1	1	0.00
Kavala	1 July 2018	30 June 2020	54	33	12	9	61.11
Veria	13 August 2020	30 June 2022	55	34	12	9	61.82
Panserraikos	22 November 2022	30 June 2023	28	20	3	5	71.43
AEL	7 October 2023	17 September 2024	32	17	12	3	53.13
Iraklis	20 November 2024	13 May 2025	17	13	3	1	76.47
Panionios	1 July 2025	7 March 2026	23	14	5	4	60.87
Total			537	258	135	144	48.04
