= Makis Chavos =

Greek football manager and former player

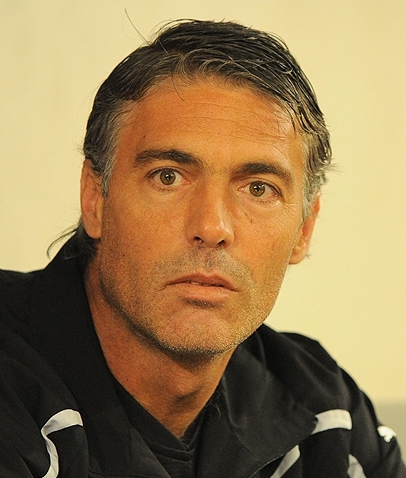

Personal information
- Full name: Ioakim Chavos
- Date of birth: 5 September 1969 (age 57)
- Place of birth: Nea Madytos, Greece
- Height: 1.79 m (5 ft 10 in)
- Position: Defender

Youth career
- –1987: Achilleas Triandria

Senior career*
Years	Team	Apps	(Gls)
1987–1988	Olympiacos	3	(0)
1988	Apollon Kalamarias	3	(0)
1988–1989	Trikala	28	(2)
1989–1992	Panserraikos	82	(8)
1992–1996	PAOK	118	(5)
1996–2000	Xanthi	102	(4)
2000–2002	Akratitos	61	(1)
2003	Panserraikos	13	(0)
2003	Ethnikos Asteras	3	(0)
2003–2005	Thrasyvoulos	51	(2)
Total		464	(22)

International career
1992	Greece	1	(0)

Managerial career
- 2008–2009: Asteras Tripolis (assistant)
- 2009–2010: Agrotikos Asteras
- 2010: PAOK (assistant)
- 2010–2011: PAOK
- 2012: Veria
- 2013–2015: Panetolikos
- 2015–2016: AEL Limassol
- 2016: Asteras Tripolis
- 2017–2018: Panetolikos
- 2018–2019: Lamia
- 2019–2020: Panetolikos
- 2021: Apollon Smyrnis
- 2023–2024: Kalamata
- * Club domestic league appearances and goals

Makis Chavos (Greek: Μάκης Χάβος; born 5 September 1969) is a Greek professional football manager and former player.

Chavos is best remembered for his four-and-a-half-year spell with PAOK. During the later stages of his career, he played with several clubs in the lower divisions. As a manager, he has coached several clubs in Greece and Cyprus.

== Playing career ==
=== Club ===
After playing as an amateur for Achilleas Triandria, Chavos transferred to Olympiacos in 1987. After making three appearances for the Reds during the first half of the 1987–88 season, he moved on loan to Apollon Kalamarias for the remainder of the season. He then transferred to Trikala and enjoyed a fairly successful season, appearing in 28 games and scoring 2 goals. He then transferred to Panserraikos for the next 3 years, appearing in a total of 82 games and scoring 8 goals. This earned him a move to PAOK in 1992 where he spent the next four and a half seasons with the Thessaloniki-based club. Whilst playing for PAOK, he received his one and only cap with the Greece national team, appearing in a friendly against Cyprus on 2 September 1992.

=== International ===
His sole cap for the Greece national team came in a friendly game against Cyprus on 2 September 1992, at the Kaftanzoglio Stadium. In the second half, he came on as a substitute in place of Stratos Apostolakis.

== Managerial career ==
Chavos started his managerial career in 2009 for Agrotikos Asteras. His greatest success came in December 2010 with PAOK when they qualified for Round 32 of UEFA Europa League, after an away victory against Dinamo Zagreb.
