= Kostas Chalkias =

Greek footballer (born in 1974)

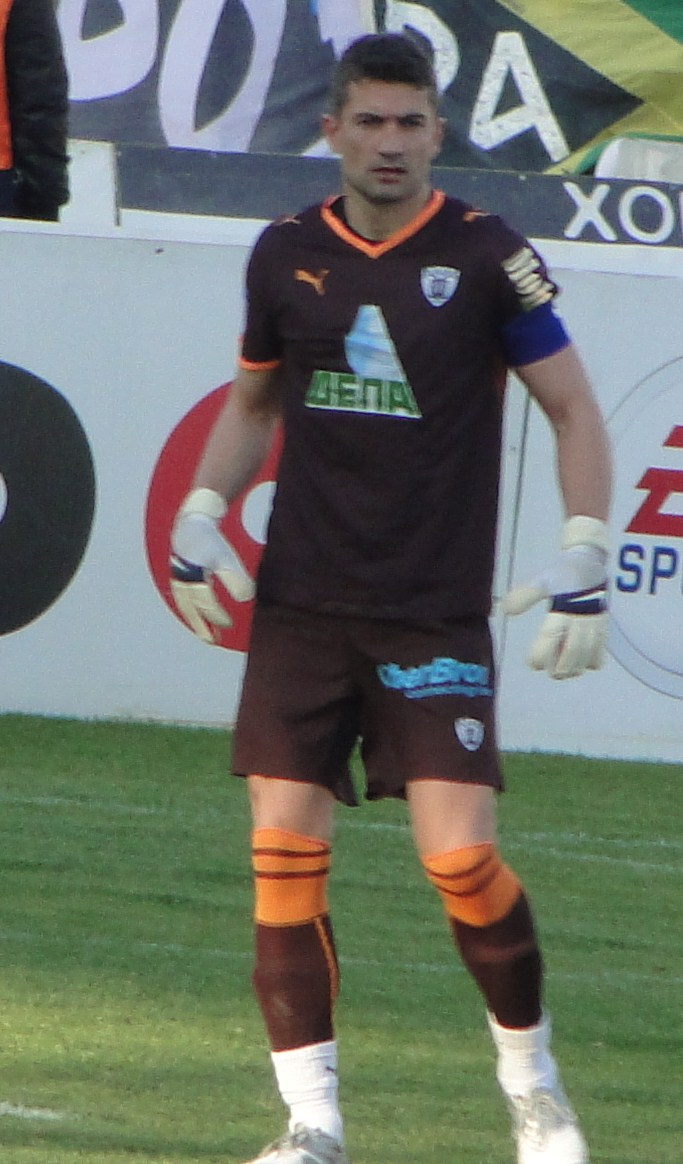
- Chalkias playing for PAOK in 2010

Personal information
- Full name: Konstantinos Chalkias
- Date of birth: 30 May 1974 (age 52)
- Place of birth: Larissa, Greece
- Height: 1.97 m (6 ft 6 in)
- Position: Goalkeeper

Youth career
- 1993–1994: Apollon Larissa
- 1994–1995: Panathinaikos

Senior career*
Years	Team	Apps	(Gls)
1995–1996	Panathinaikos	0	(0)
1996–1998	Apollon Athens	59	(0)
1998–2001	Panathinaikos	10	(0)
1999	→ Apollon Athens (loan)	16	(0)
2001–2003	Iraklis	50	(0)
2003–2005	Panathinaikos	21	(0)
2005–2006	Portsmouth	5	(0)
2006	Real Murcia	2	(0)
2006–2008	Aris	51	(0)
2008–2012	PAOK	85	(0)
2016–2018	Panachaiki	3	(0)
Total		302	(0)

International career
2001–2012	Greece	32	(0)
Medal record
Men's football
Representing Greece
UEFA European Championship
Winner	2004
World Military Cup
Winner	1997
- * Club domestic league appearances and goals

Konstantinos "Kostas" Chalkias (Greek: Κωνσταντίνος "Κώστας" Χαλκιάς; born 30 May 1974) is a Greek retired professional footballer who played as a goalkeeper. He played for Panathinaikos, Apollon Athens, Iraklis, Portsmouth, Real Murcia, Aris, PAOK and Panachaiki.

He was also capped 32 times by the Greece national team, with whom he won Euro 2004. He also was selected at the next two European Championships and the 2010 FIFA World Cup.

== Club career ==
=== Greece ===
Chalkias started his career with Toxotis Larissa before moving to Apollon Larissa in 1993. Later he joined the Panathinaikos youth academy in the 1994–95 double winning team. He was transferred to feeder club Apollon Athens in 1996 as a replacement for retired Antonis Minou, signing a five-year professional contract. His solid performances helped Apollon avoid relegation from Alpha Ethniki and made him return to Panathinaikos two years later, in 1998. However, he did not get any playing time at Panathinaikos by his head coach Vasilis Daniil and in January 1999 he was re-sent to Apollon on loan for six months. After his return, he was forced to play third keeper to the legendary Jozef Wandzik and Greek legend Antonis Nikopolidis. He made a total of 25 starts over the next three years between 1998 and 2001 for Panathinaikos and was transferred for two seasons to Iraklis before good performances led to a return to Panathinaikos in the 2003–04 season. After playing second fiddle again to Nikopolidis during most of the 2003–04 season, he was allowed back into the first team after a dispute Nikopolidis had with management.

=== Going abroad ===
At the end of the 2003–04 season, Nikopolidis was let out on a free transfer to bitter rivals, Olympiakos, and a new keeper was bought, Mario Galinovic. After a fight for first team football, eventually Galinovic won out and due to overseas interest, Chalkias was shipped out to English side Portsmouth F.C. in January 2005, making his debut in the FA Cup fourth round tie away at fierce rivals Southampton. Over the next few matches Chalkias's wild tactics and inconsistency led to some poorly conceded goals, and he was soon dropped and replaced by Jamie Ashdown. With the signing of Sander Westerveld in July 2005, Chalkias fell even further down the pecking order, and in January 2006 he left Portsmouth by mutual consent, having made only five league appearances for the club. Shortly after his release from Portsmouth he joined Segunda División side Real Murcia.

=== Return to Greece ===
Chalkias was bought in the summer transfer window of 2006 by Aris Thessaloniki, who were then newly promoted to the Super League Greece. After his transfer to Aris, Chalkias regained some of the form that he showed during his bright run in the first team for Panathinaikos and after an exceptional season, he was recalled tο the national team and gained a starting spot over Antonis Nikopolidis after the latter's poor performance earlier in a Euro 2008 qualifying match against Turkey.

Chalkias left Aris in late May 2008 after his contract was due to run out and on 28 May 2008 he agreed to sign a two-year contract for rivals PAOK, thus becoming the third player to have played for the all three major clubs of Thessaloniki (Iraklis, Aris, PAOK) following Apostolos Tsourelas and Stefanos Borbokis.

In the 2009–10 season he reached the second position with PAOK and the semifinal of the Greek cup. In January 2010 he renewed his contract with PAOK for two more years. Chalkias has contributed to the qualification of PAOK the 2010–11 UEFA Champions League third qualifying round, after winning the preliminaries against AEK Athens, Olympiakos and Aris Thessaloniki F.C.

=== Retirement and comeback ===
On 22 September 2012, Chalkias announced his retirement from football.

After four years of inactivity, he returned to the football for the Greek team Panachaiki. He was the last player from the legendary Euro 2004-winning Greece team to retire from professional football.

== International career ==
Chalkias made his debut on 10 November 2001, in a friendly 4–2 home win against Estonia, as he replaced Antonis Nikopolidis at half time. In the summer 2004 he was part of the squad which won Euro 2004, although he was only the reserve 'keeper. Otto Rehhagel called him also for the qualification of Euro 2008. Chalkias played as the first goalkeeper for the Greece national team during most of the qualification for the World Cup 2010, after the retirement of the legendary goalkeeper Antonis Nikopolidis and he is the only goalkeeper from the Euro 2004.

In Euro 2012 Chalkias was the oldest player at the tournament at 38 years of age and one of just three players remaining from the victorious 2004 Greek squad. On 12 June 2012, he started the second group stage match against Czech Republic – at the 21st minute of the match, and having conceded two goals in 6 minutes, he was substituted with Michalis Sifakis due to injury. After Greece's lost quarterfinal to Germany on 22 June, a game which Chalkias watched from the bench, he announced his withdrawal from the national team alongside Nikos Liberopoulos.

== Career statistics ==
Appearances and goals by club, season and competition
Club	Season	League			Cup (Note: Includes appearances in the Greek Cup and FA Cup.)		Continental (Note: Includes appearances in the UEFA Champions League and UEFA Europa League.)		Others (Note: Includes appearances in the Super League Greece play-offs.)		Total	
Club	Season	Division	Apps	Goals	Apps	Goals	Apps	Goals	Apps	Goals	Apps	Goals
Panathinaikos	1995–96	Alpha Ethniki	0	0							0	0
Apollon Smyrnis	1996–97	Super League Greece	29	0							29	0
Apollon Smyrnis	1997–98	Super League Greece	30	0							30	0
Apollon Smyrnis	Total		59	0							59	0
Panathinaikos	1998–99	Super League Greece	0	0							0	0
Apollon Smyrnis (loan)	1998–99	Super League Greece	16	0							16	0
Panathinaikos	1999–2000	Super League Greece	6	0							6	0
Panathinaikos	2000–01	Super League Greece	4	0			4	0			8	0
Panathinaikos	Total		10	0			4	0			14	0
Iraklis	2001–02	Super League Greece	25	0							25	0
Iraklis	2002–03	Super League Greece	25	0							25	0
Iraklis	Total		50	0							50	0
Panathinaikos	2003–04	Super League Greece	11	0			4	0			15	0
Panathinaikos	2004–05	Super League Greece	10	0			4	0			14	0
Panathinaikos	Total		21	0			8	0			29	0
Portsmouth	2004–05	Premier League	5	0	1	0					6	0
Portsmouth	2005–06	Premier League	0	0							0	0
Portsmouth	Total		5	0	1	0					6	0
Real Murcia	2005–06	Segunda División	2	0			–				2	0
Aris	2006–07	Super League Greece	29	0			1	0			30	0
Aris	2007–08	Super League Greece	22	0			4	0			26	0
Aris	Total		51	0			5	0			56	0
PAOK	2008–09	Super League Greece	29	0					6	0	35	0
PAOK	2009–10	Super League Greece	28	0			4	0	4	0	36	0
PAOK	2010–11	Super League Greece	14	0	3	0	3	0	6	0	26	0
PAOK	2011–12	Super League Greece	14	0			3	0	5	0	22	0
PAOK	Total		85	0	3	0	10	0	21	0	119	0
Panachaiki	2016–17	Gamma Ethniki	0	0	2	0	–				2	0
Panachaiki	2017–18	Gamma Ethniki	3	0	1	0	–				4	0
Panachaiki	Total		3	0	3	0	0	0	0	0	6	0
Career total			302	0	7	0	27	0	21	0	357	0

== Honours ==
Panathinaikos

- Alpha Ethniki: 1995–96, 2003–04
- Greek Cup: 2003–04

Panachaiki

- Gamma Ethniki: 2016–17

Greece

- UEFA European Championship: 2004

Individual

- PAOK MVP of the Season: 2008–09
