= 2014–15 PAOK FC season =

PAOK
2014–15 season
- President: Iakovos Angelides
- Manager: Angelos Anastasiadis (until 16 March 2015); Georgios Georgiadis (interim)
- Stadium: Toumba Stadium
- Super League Greece: 3rd
- Greek Cup: Group stage
- UEFA Europa League: Group stage
- Top goalscorer: League: Stefanos Athanasiadis; Facundo Pereyra (11 each); All: Stefanos Athanasiadis (18)
Home colours	Away colours	Third colours

The 2014–15 season was PAOK Football Club's 89th in existence and the club's 56th consecutive season in the top flight of Greek football. The team will enter the Greek Football Cup in the Second Round and will also compete in UEFA Europa League starting from the Play-off round.

On 19 May 2014, Angelos Anastasiadis become PAOK's manager by signing a two-year contract.

== Players ==
=== Squad ===
Note: Flags indicate national team as defined under FIFA eligibility rules; some limited exceptions apply. Players may hold more than one non-FIFA nationality.

No.	Pos.	Nation	Player
1	GK	ESP	Jacobo
2	DF	GRE	Giannis Skondras
3	DF	GRE	Georgios Tzavellas
4	DF	GRE	Giorgos Katsikas
5	DF	ROU	Răzvan Raț
6	MF	GRE	Alexandros Tziolis
7	MF	ISR	Eyal Golasa
8	MF	NED	Hedwiges Maduro
9	FW	GRE	Dimitrios Papadopoulos
10	FW	ARG	Facundo Pereyra
11	MF	SVK	Róbert Mak
13	DF	SWE	Sotirios Papagiannopoulos
14	FW	GRE	Dimitris Salpingidis (vice-captain)
15	DF	POR	Miguel Vítor
16	MF	ECU	Christian Noboa
18	FW	GRE	Efthimis Koulouris
20	DF	POR	Ricardo Costa

No.	Pos.	Nation	Player
21	DF	GRE	Nikos Spyropoulos
22	DF	GRE	Dimitris Konstantinidis
23	MF	GRE	Panagiotis Deligiannidis
24	DF	GRE	Stelios Pozatzidis
25	MF	ROU	Costin Lazar
26	MF	ALB	Ergys Kaçe
27	GK	CMR	Charles Itandje
28	MF	ESP	Lucas
32	MF	GRE	Theofanis Tzandaris
33	FW	GRE	Stefanos Athanasiadis (captain)
37	DF	ALB	Kristi Qose
40	MF	BEL	Maarten Martens
50	GK	GRE	Asterios Giakoumis
70	DF	GRE	Stelios Kitsiou
71	GK	GRE	Panagiotis Glykos (vice-captain)
88	DF	GRE	Kyriakos Savvidis
96	MF	GRE	Stelios Pozoglou

=== Out on loan ===
Note: Flags indicate national team as defined under FIFA eligibility rules; some limited exceptions apply. Players may hold more than one non-FIFA nationality.

No.	Pos.	Nation	Player
—	GK	ESP	Jacobo (at Tenerife)
—	GK	GRE	Nikos Melissas (at Iraklis Psachna)
—	DF	ALB	Kristi Qose (at Apollon Kalamarias)
—	MF	GRE	Stefanos Polyzos (at Aiginiakos)
—	MF	GRE	Kostas Panagiotoudis (at Veria)
—	MF	GRE	Dimitrios Pelkas (at Vitória Setúbal)

No.	Pos.	Nation	Player
—	MF	GRE	Dimitris Giannoulis (at Pierikos)
—	MF	ESP	Lucas (at Deportivo La Coruna)
—	MF	GRE	Dimitris Popovic (at Aiginiakos)
—	FW	GRE	Giannis Mystakidis (at Pierikos)
—	FW	GRE	Vasilis Papadopoulos (at Apollon Kalamarias)

== Kit ==
Supplier: Nike
Sponsor(s): Pame Stoixima

Home	Away	Third	Fourth

Source: PAOK FC official website

== Pre-season and friendlies ==
Win Draw Loss

12 July 2014 Friendly	Standard Liège	2–1	PAOK	Netherlands
18:00	Bia 40', 75'	Report	60' Koulouris

15 July 2014 Friendly	FC Dnipro	1–0	PAOK	Netherlands
19:00	Seleznyov 70'	Report

18 July 2014 Friendly	Zwolle	2–1	PAOK	netherlands
20:00	Pereira 23'; Drost 75'	Report	45' Spyropoulos

23 July 2014 Friendly	Waalwijk	1–2	PAOK	netherlands
20:00	Calabro 44'	Report	14' Mak; 65' Pozoglou

26 July 2014 Friendly	Cambuur	1–1	PAOK
19:30	Meleg 40'	Report	14' Athanasiadis

2 August 2014 Friendly	Napoli	2–0	PAOK	Naples, Italy
22:00	Callejón 3'; Radošević 90+1'	Report		Stadium: San Paolo

5 August 2014 Friendly	PAOK	1–0	Xanthi	Thessaloniki, Greece
20:00	Salpingidis 83'	Report		Stadium: Toumba Stadium

9 August 2014 Friendly	QPR	0–1	PAOK	London
17:00		Report	66' (o.g.) Hill	Stadium: Loftus Road

14 August 2014 Friendly	PAOK	0–0	Internazionale	Thessaloniki, Greece
20:30		Report		Stadium: Toumba Stadium

== Competitions ==
=== Overview ===
Competition	Record							
Competition	Pld	W	D	L	GF	GA	GD	Win %
Super League Greece	34	20	5	9	57	42	+15	58.82
Greek Cup	3	0	2	1	1	2	−1	0.00
UEFA Europa League	8	3	1	4	14	8	+6	37.50
UEFA play-offs	6	0	2	4	1	6	−5	0.00
Total	51	23	10	18	73	58	+15	45.10

Last updated: 10 February 2017.
Source: Competitions

=== Managerial statistics ===
Head coach	From	To	Record							
Head coach	From	To	G	W	D	L	GF	GA	GD	Win %
(Greece) Angelos Anastasiadis	Start Season	16.03.2015	38	19	6	13	65	47	+18	50.00
(Greece) G. Georgiadis (Interim)	16.03.2015	30.06.2015	13	4	4	5	8	11	−3	30.77

== Super League Greece ==
=== League table ===
Pos	Team	Pld	W	D	L	GF	GA	GD	Pts	Qualification or relegation
1	Olympiacos (C)	34	24	6	4	79	23	+56	78	Qualification for the Champions League group stage
2	Panathinaikos (Note: Panathinaikos were deducted 3 points due to extreme fan behavior.)	34	21	6	7	59	31	+28	66	Qualification for the Play-offs
3	PAOK	34	20	5	9	57	42	+15	65	Qualification for the Play-offs
4	Asteras Tripolis	34	17	8	9	52	37	+15	59	Qualification for the Play-offs
5	Atromitos	34	14	12	8	43	27	+16	54	Qualification for the Play-offs

Source: Super League Greece
Rules for classification: 1) Points; 2) Head-to-head goal difference; 3) Head-to-head points; 4) Goals scored; 5) Play-offs (neutral ground).
(Note: Criteria 5 is only used if needed to decide champion, teams for relegation or teams for UEFA competitions). In any other case, the final standings of tied teams are determined with a public draw.
(C) Champions

=== Results summary ===
Overall								Home						Away					
Pld	W	D	L	GF	GA	GD	Pts	W	D	L	GF	GA	GD	W	D	L	GF	GA	GD
34	20	5	9	57	42	+15	65	11	4	2	30	14	+16	9	1	7	27	28	−1

Last updated: 10 February 2017.
Source: Competitive matches

=== Results by round ===
Round	1	2	3	4	5	6	7	8	9	10	11	12	13	14	15	16	17	18	19	20	21	22	23	24	25	26	27	28	29	30	31	32	33	34
Ground	H	A	H	A	H	H	H	A	H	H	A	A	H	A	A	H	A	A	H	A	H	A	H	A	A	A	H	H	A	H	A	H	H	A
Result	D	W	W	W	W	W	W	W	L	W	W	L	W	L	W	W	L	W	W	W	L	L	D	L	W	L	D	W	L	W	W	D	W	D
Position	11	3	2	2	1	1	1	1	1	1	1	1	1	1	1	1	2	2	2	2	2	3	3	3	3	3	3	3	3	3	2	3	2	3

Source: League matches
A = Away; H = Home; W = Win; D = Draw; L = Loss

=== Matches ===
Win Draw Loss

24 August 2014 1	PAOK	1–1	AEL Kalloni	Thessaloniki
19:15 EET	Spyropoulos (yellow card) 24'; M. Vítor (yellow card) 66'; Pereyra 74' (red card) 87' Manager: (Greece) Angelos Anastasiadis	Report	(yellow card) 60' (yellow-red card) 90+4' Barrera; 63' Camara; (yellow card) 82' Keita; (yellow card) 88' Leozinho Manager: (Greece) Giannis Matzourakis	Stadium: Toumba Stadium; Referee: Georgios Kominis

24 August 2014 2	Platanias	0–4	PAOK	Chania, Crete
19:15 EET	Mahamat (yellow card) 29'; Tetteh (yellow card) 66' (yellow-red card) 80' Manager: (Greece) Giannis Christopoulos	Report	39' Athanasiadis; 52' Salpingidis; (yellow card) 55' Kaçe; (yellow card) 62' Tziolis; (yellow card) 70' (goal) 83' Mak; 89' Skondras Manager: (Greece) Angelos Anastasiadis	Stadium: Perivolia Municipal Stadium; Referee: Charalampos Kalogeropoulos

13 September 2014 3	PAOK	3–0	Niki Volos	Thessaloniki
18:15 EET	Athanasiadis 22' (yellow card) 56'; Pereyra 47'; Mak 80' (pen.) Manager: (Greece) Angelos Anastasiadis	Report	(yellow card) 63' Angelos Argyris Manager: (Netherlands) Wiljan Vloet	Stadium: Toumba Stadium; Referee: Giorgos Kizas

22 September 2014 4	Panetolikos	0–1	PAOK	Agrinio
16:00 EET	Theodoridis (yellow card) 31'; Koutromanos (yellow card) 36'; Bejarano (yellow card) 63'; Godoy (yellow card) 79'; Kevin (yellow card) 89' Manager: (Greece) Makis Chavos	Report	(yellow card) 20' Kaçe; 35' (pen.) Mak; (yellow card) 71' Katsikas; (yellow card) 76' Tzandaris Manager: (Greece) Angelos Anastasiadis	Stadium: Panetolikos Stadium; Referee: Michalis Koukoulakis

28 September 2014 5	PAOK	4–0	OFI	Thessaloniki
20:30 EET	Raț 2', 43' (yellow card) 16'; Mak 27'; Athanasiadis 45' Manager: (Greece) Angelos Anastasiadis	Report	(yellow card) 42' Moniakis Manager: (Italy) Gennaro Gattuso	Stadium: Toumba Stadium; Referee: Georgios Kizas

19 October 2014 7	PAOK	2–1	Atromitos	Thessaloniki
20:30 EET	Vítor (yellow card) 22' (yellow-red card) 76'; Kaçe 27' (yellow card) 64'; Raț 29'; Golasa (yellow card) 67' Manager: (Greece) Angelos Anastasiadis	Report	61' Umbides; (yellow card) 79' Tavlaridis; (yellow card) 83' Tatos; (yellow card) 85' Nastos Manager: (Portugal) Sá Pinto	Stadium: Toumba Stadium; Referee: Anastasios Sidiropoulos

26 October 2014 8	PAOK	4–1	Veria	Thessaloniki
17.15 EET	Mak 25'; Salpingidis 42'; Kaçe 57'; Tzandaris (yellow card) 60'; Athanasiadis 79' Manager: (Greece) Angelos Anastasiadis	Report	(yellow card) 28' Amarantidis; Ben 83' Manager: (Spain) Carlos Granero	Stadium: Toumba Stadium; Referee: Andreas Pappas

2 November 2014 9	Ergotelis	0–2	PAOK	Heraklion
15:00 EET	Manager: (Greece) Pavlos Dermitzakis	Report	42', 90+5' Athanasiadis; (yellow card) 75' Spyropoulos Manager: (Greece) Angelos Anastasiadis	Stadium: Pankritio Stadium; Referee: Alexandros Dimitropoulos

9 November 2014 10	PAOK	1–2	Panathinaikos	Thessaloniki
19:30 EET	Spyropoulos (yellow card) 44'; Kaçe (yellow card) 55'; Pereyra 64'; Vítor (yellow card) 89' Manager: (Greece) Angelos Anastasiadis	Report	(yellow card) 39' Bouy; 51' Ajagun; (yellow card) 53' Klonaridis; 79' Karelis Manager: (Greece) Yannis Anastasiou	Stadium: Toumba Stadium; Referee: Stavros Tritsonis

30 November 2014 12	PAOK	3–2	Panthrakikos	Thessaloniki
17:15 EET	Salpingidis 7'; Papadopoulos 62'; Pereyra 65'; Glykos (yellow card) 90+2' Manager: (Greece) Angelos Anastasiadis	Report	32' Diguiny; 55' Tsoumanis; (yellow card) 58' M'Bow Manager: (Spain) José Roca	Stadium: Toumba Stadium; Referee: Dimitris Thanos

3 December 2014 6	Olympiacos	1–2	PAOK	Piraeus
19:30 EET	Fuster 45+1' (yellow card) 87' Manager: (Spain) Míchel	Report	(yellow card) 8' Raț; (yellow card) 27' Kaçe; 43' Athanasiadis; (yellow card) 48' Skondras; 49' Pereyra; (yellow card) 61' Tzandaris; (yellow card) 90+2' Golasa Manager: (Greece) Angelos Anastasiadis	Stadium: Karaiskakis Stadium; Referee: Alexandros Aretopoulos

7 December 2014 13	Xanthi	4–2	PAOK	Xanthi
15:00 EET	Kapetanos 6', 88'; Lucero 47'; Fliskas (yellow card) 51'; Bertos (yellow card) 60'; Soltani (yellow card) 72'; Cleyton 77'; Papasterianos (yellow card) 84'; Karipidis (yellow card) 86' Manager: (Romania) Răzvan Lucescu	Report	38' Athanasiadis; (yellow card) 52' Kaçe; (yellow card) 63' Papadopoulos; 82' Mak; (yellow card) 84' Raț Manager: (Greece) Angelos Anastasiadis	Stadium: Xanthi FC Arena; Referee: Charalambos Kalogeropoulos

14 December 2014 14	PAOK	2–1	Kerkyra	Thessaloniki
17:15 EET	Pereyra 58'; Raț (yellow card) 78'Kaçe 82' Manager: (Greece) Angelos Anastasiadis	Report	(yellow card) 54' (goal) 70' Nayar; (yellow card) 56' Dimitrovski; (yellow card) 74' Andreopoulos Manager: (Greece) Michalis Grigoriou	Stadium: Toumba Stadium; Referee: Mixalhs Koukoulakis

18 December 2014 15	PAS Giannina	3–0	PAOK	Ioannina
17:15 EET	Lila 26' (yellow card) 27'; Korovesis 73' (yellow card) 74'; Manias 90+3' (yellow card) 90+4' (yellow-red card) 90+4' Manager: (Greece) Giannis Petrakis	Report	(yellow card) 13' Vítor; (yellow card) 45+2' Athanasiadis; (yellow card) 76' Tzandaris; (yellow card) 89' Papadopoulos Manager: (Greece) Angelos Anastasiadis	Stadium: Zosimades Stadium; Referee: Michalis Boskakis

21 December 2014 16	Levadiakos	1–2	PAOK	Livadeia
17:15 EET	Mantzios (red card) 23'; Rubén Gómez (yellow card) 67'; Koné 80' Manager: (Greece) Savvas Pantelidis	Report	12' (red card) 23' Tzavellas; (yellow card) 49' Raț; 51' Pereyra; (yellow card) 53' Papadopoulos; (yellow card) 83' Itandje; (yellow card) 90+3' Maduro Manager: (Greece) Angelos Anastasiadis	Stadium: Levadia Municipal Stadium; Referee: Andreas Pappas

3 January 2015 17	PAOK	3–2	Panionios	Thessaloniki
19:30 EET	Vítor 8'; Maduro 30' (yellow card) 49'; Raț (yellow card) 45+1'; Papadopoulos (yellow card) 71'; Athanasiadis 72' (pen.); Skondras (yellow card) 89'; Golasa (yellow card) 90+4' Manager: (Greece) Angelos Anastasiadis	Report	2' Giannou; 10' (pen.) (yellow card) 24' Kolovos; (yellow card) 36' Tasoulis; (yellow card) 45+1' N. Papadopoulos; (yellow card) 71' (yellow-red card) 88' Ibagaza Manager: (Greece) Dimitris Terezopoulos	Stadium: Toumba Stadium; Referee: Ioannis Delfakis

10 January 2015 11	Asteras Tripolis	3–0	PAOK	Tripoli
17:15 EET	Barrales (penalty missed) 7', (yellow card) 27'; Gianniotas 9', 45' (yellow card) 70'; Sankaré 30'; Rolle (yellow card) 52'; Kourbelis (yellow card) 85' Manager: (Greece) Στάικος Βεργέτης	Report	(yellow card) 6' Tzandaris; (yellow card) 37' Skondras; (yellow card) 77' Maduro; (yellow card) 86' Athanasiadis Manager: (Greece) Angelos Anastasiadis	Stadium: Theodoros Kolokotronis Stadium; Referee: Xaralampos Kalogeropoulos

14 January 2015 18	AEL Kalloni	1–2	PAOK	Mytilene
19:30 EET	Kaltsas 7'; Manousos (penalty missed) 82'; Juanma (yellow card) 84' Manager: (Greece) Giannis Matzourakis	Report	(yellow card) 35' Vítor; (red card) 37' Kaçe; (yellow card) 42' Papadopoulos; 50', 58' Pereyra; (yellow card) 54' Tzandaris; (yellow card) 68' Athanasiadis; (yellow card) 70' Salpingidis; (yellow card) 81' Konstantinidis Manager: (Greece) Angelos Anastasiadis	Stadium: Mytilene Municipal Stadium; Referee: Christos Mitsios

18 January 2015 19	PAOK	1–0	Platanias	Thessaloniki
17:15 EET	Athanasiadis 24'; Maduro (yellow card) 45'; Skondras (yellow card) 80'; Golasa (yellow card) 90+4' Manager: (Greece) Angelos Anastasiadis	Report	(yellow card) 53' Apostolopoulos Manager: (Greece) Giannis Christopoulos	Stadium: Toumba Stadium; Referee: Stavros Tritsonis

25 January 2015 20	Niki Volos	0–3	PAOK	Volos
17:15 EET		https://int.soccerway.com/matches/2015/01/25/greece/super-league/niki-volos/paok-fc/1739387/ Match awarded 0-3 by FA decision		Stadium: Panthessaliko Stadium

31 January 2015 21	PAOK	1–2	Panetolikos	Thessaloniki
19:30 EET	Athanasiadis (yellow card) 6'; Maduro (yellow card) 49'; Raț (yellow card) 53'; Mak 73'; Noboa (yellow card) 82' Manager: (Greece) Angelos Anastasiadis	Report	7', 90+4' André Alves; (yellow card) 70' Bejarano; (yellow card) 79' N. Martínez; (yellow card) 90+1' Stefanakos Manager: (Greece) Makis Chavos	Stadium: Toumba Stadium; Referee: Alexandros Dimitropoulos

4 February 2015 22	OFI	3–1	PAOK	Heraklion
17:15 EET	Mayron George 11'; Labropoulos 34' (pen.); Rovithis (yellow card) 45'; Moniakis (yellow card) 56'; Koutsianikoulis 82' (yellow card) 82' Manager: (Greece) Nikos Anastopoulos	Report	(yellow card) 33' Ricardo Costa; (yellow card) 48' Tzandaris; 52' Papadopoulos Manager: (Greece) Angelos Anastasiadis	Stadium: Theodoros Vardinogiannis Stadium; Referee: Giorgos Kominis

8 February 2015 23	PAOK	0–0	Olympiacos	Thessaloniki
19:30 EET	Salpingidis (yellow card) 34'; Ricardo Costa (yellow card) 55'; Mak (yellow card) 59'; Vítor (yellow card) 90+2' Manager: (Greece) Angelos Anastasiadis	Report	(yellow card) 29' Kasami; (yellow card) 51' Masuaku; (yellow card) 64' Domínguez; (yellow card) 67' Maniatis; (yellow card) 67' Milivojević Manager: (Portugal) Vítor Pereira	Stadium: Toumba Stadium; Referee: Alexandros Giaxos

15 February 2015 24	Atromitos	4–0	PAOK	Peristeri, Athens
19:30 EET	Katsouranis (yellow card) 13' (goal) 72'; Kouros (yellow card) 26'; Dimoutsos 39'; Umbides 51'; Napoleoni 77' Manager: (Greece) Nikos Nioplias	Report	(yellow card) 31' (yellow-red card) 42' Athanasiadis Manager: (Greece) Angelos Anastasiadis	Stadium: Peristeri Stadium; Referee: Alexandros Aretopoulos

21 February 2015 25	Veria	1–3	PAOK	Veria
19:30 EET	Raúl Bravo (yellow card) 23'; Dumitru 61'; Xavier Ginard (yellow card) 68'; Cámpora (yellow card) 85' Manager: (Spain) Carlos Granero	Report	10' Pereyra; (yellow card) 13' (goal) 28' Vítor; (yellow card) 33' Ricardo Costa; (yellow card) 39' Golasa; 42' Noboa; (yellow card) 75' Papagiannopoulos; (yellow card) 85' Kaçe; (yellow card) 90' Pozoglou Manager: (Greece) Angelos Anastasiadis	Stadium: Veria Stadium; Referee: Aristomenis Koutsiaftis

8 March 2015 27	Panathinaikos	4–3	PAOK	Athens
19:30 EET	Berg 27', 70', 87' (yellow card) 75'; Karelis 63' Manager: (Greece) Yannis Anastasiou	Report	42' (yellow card) 90+1' Athanasiadis; 60' Skondras; 90+3' Noboa Manager: (Greece) Angelos Anastasiadis	Stadium: Leoforos Alexandras Stadium; Referee: Stavros Mantalos

14 March 2015 28	PAOK	0–0	Asteras Tripolis	Thessaloniki
19:30 EET	Kaçe (yellow card) 58' (yellow-red card) 50'; Noboa (yellow card) 86' Manager: (Greece) Angelos Anastasiadis	Report	(yellow card) 37' Goian Manager: (Greece) Στάικος Βεργέτης	Stadium: Toumba Stadium; Referee: Stavros Tritsonis

18 March 2015 26	PAOK	1–0	Ergotelis	Thessaloniki
17:15 EET	Papadopoulos (yellow card) 74' (goal) 83'; Skondras (yellow card) 77' Manager: (Greece) Georgios Georgiadis	Report	(yellow card) 41' Boé-Kane; (yellow card) 73' Calé; (yellow card) 76' Gorkšs; (yellow card) 88' Solari Manager: (Greece) G. Taousianis	Stadium: Toumba Stadium; Referee: Giorgos Kominis

21 March 2015 29	Panthrakikos	3–1	PAOK	Komotini
19:00 EET	Tsoumanis (yellow card) 6'; Diguiny 7'; Tzanis 43'; Igor 79' (pen.); Iliadis (yellow card) 89'; Mejía (yellow card) 90+2' Manager: (Spain) José Roca	Report	(yellow card) 26' Vítor; (yellow card) 42' (yellow-red card) 83' Skondras; (yellow card) 55' Tzavellas; 63' (yellow card) 77' Papadopoulos; (yellow card) 67' Noboa; (yellow card) 73' Pereyra Manager: (Greece) Georgios Georgiadis	Stadium: Komotini Municipal Stadium; Referee: Styliaras

5 April 2015 30	PAOK	2–1	Xanthi	Thessaloniki
17:15 EET	Papadopoulos 21', 54'; Mak (yellow card) 26'; Athanasiadis (yellow card) 90+2' Manager: (Greece) Georgios Georgiadis	Report	(yellow card) 28' Kapetanos; 73' Cleyton; (yellow card) 87' Vasilakakis; (yellow card) 90+2' Bertos; (yellow card) 90+2' Baxevanidis; (yellow card) 90+4' Soltani Manager: (Romania) Răzvan Lucescu	Stadium: Toumba Stadium; Referee: Mixalis Boskakis

18 April 2015 31	Kerkyra	0–1	PAOK	Kerkyra
19:30 EET	matie Gomez (yellow card) 20'; Markovski (yellow card) 70'; Leal (yellow card) 81'; Ghazaryan (yellow card) 86' Manager: (Greece) Michalis Grigoriou	Report	(yellow card) 14' Noboa; (yellow card) 22' (yellow-red card) 65' Raț; 83' Kaçe Manager: (Greece) Georgios Georgiadis	Stadium: Kerkyra Stadium; Referee: Dimitrios Thanos

26 April 2015 32	PAOK	1–1	PAS Giannina	Thessaloniki
15:00 EET	Pereyra 14'; Golasa (yellow card) 46'; Koulouris (yellow card) 60' Manager: (Greece) Georgios Georgiadis	Report	12' (yellow card) 37' Chávez; (yellow card) 22' (yellow-red card) 90+2' Charisis; (yellow card) 88' Vellidis Manager: (Greece) Giannis Petrakis	Stadium: Toumba Stadium; Referee: Athanasios Giaxos

3 May 2015 33	PAOK	1–0	Levadiakos	Thessaloniki
19:00 EET	Papadopoulos 43' (pen.); Ricardo Costa (yellow card) 87'; Mak (yellow card) 88' Manager: (Greece) Georgios Georgiadis	Report	(yellow card) 42' Tamla Ladji; (yellow card) 60' Kotsios Manager: (Greece) Apostolos Mantzios	Stadium: Toumba Stadium; Referee: Xrhstos Mitsios

10 May 2015 34	Panionios	0–0	PAOK	Nea Smyrni, Athens
19:00 EET	Bakasetas (yellow card) 45+3'; Tasoulis (yellow card) 69' (yellow-red card) 69'; Chatziisaias (yellow card) 89'; Ibagaza (yellow card) 90+2'; Korbos (yellow card) 90+6'; Ikonomou (yellow card) 90+6' Manager: (Greece) Marinos Ouzounidis	Report	(yellow card) 53' Kitsiou; (yellow card) 87' Tziolis Manager: (Greece) Georgios Georgiadis	Stadium: Nea Smyrni Stadium; Referee: Anastasios Sidiropoulos

== Play-offs ==
=== Table ===
Pos	Team	Pld	W	D	L	GF	GA	GD	Pts	Qualification
2	Panathinaikos	6	4	1	1	9	2	+7	15	Qualification for the Champions League third qualifying round
3	Asteras Tripolis	6	2	3	1	2	4	−2	10	Qualification for the Europa League group stage
4	Atromitos	6	2	2	2	4	4	0	8	Qualification for the Europa League third qualifying round
5	PAOK	6	0	2	4	1	6	−5	4	Qualification for the Europa League second qualifying round

Source: Super League Greece: Standings and Schedule
Rules for classification: 1) points; 2) head-to-head points; 3) head-to-head goal difference; 4) head-to-head away goals rule; 5) classification of regular season.

==== Matches ====
Win Draw Loss

20 May 2015 1	Atromitos	1–1	PAOK	Peristeri, Athens
20:30 EET	Agouazi 7' (yellow card) 90+2'; Kivrakidis (yellow card) 39'; Garcia (yellow card) 54' Manager: (Greece) Nikos Nioplias	Report	32' Pereyra; (yellow card) 43' Tziolis; (yellow card) 60' Vítor; (yellow card) 75' Athanasiadis; (yellow card) 88' Raț Manager: (Greece) Georgios Georgiadis	Stadium: Peristeri Stadium; Referee: Andreas Pappas

24 May 2015 2	PAOK	0–0	Asteras Tripolis	Thessaloniki
18:15 EET	Kitsiou (yellow card) 16' Manager: (Greece) Georgios Georgiadis	Report	(yellow card) 19' Goian; (yellow card) 66' Lluy; (yellow card) 78' (yellow-red card) 83' Fernández; (yellow card) 80' Barrales Manager: (Greece) Στάικος Βεργέτης	Stadium: Toumba Stadium; Referee: Stavros Mantalos

27 May 2015 3	PAOK	0–1	Panathinaikos	Thessaloniki
19:30 EET	Kaçe (yellow card) 78'; Tziolis (yellow card) 87'; Tzavellas (yellow card) 89' Manager: (Greece) Georgios Georgiadis	Report	43' Tavlaridis; (yellow card) 63' Ajagun; (yellow card) 90' Berg Manager: (Greece) Yannis Anastasiou	Stadium: Toumba Stadium; Referee: Dimitris Styliaras

31 May 2015 4	Panathinaikos	2–0	PAOK	Athens
20:30 EET	Mavrias 10'; Karelis 28'; Schildenfeld (yellow card) 83'; Nano (yellow card) 90+3' Manager: (Greece) Yannis Anastasiou	Report	(yellow card) 83' Pereyra; (yellow card) 90+2' Raț Manager: (Greece) Georgios Georgiadis	Stadium: Leoforos Alexandras Stadium; Referee: Xrhstos Mitsios

3 June 2015 5	PAOK	0–1	Atromitos	Thessaloniki
20:30 EET	Konstantinidis (yellow card) 59'; Athanasiadis (yellow card) 45+1'; Kaçe (yellow card) 90+3' Manager: (Greece) Georgios Georgiadis	Report	45' (yellow card) 45+1' Karamanos; (yellow card) 87' Agouazi; (yellow card) 89' Papazoglou Manager: (Greece) Nikos Nioplias	Stadium: Toumba Stadium; Referee: Giorgos Daskalopoulos

7 June 2015 6	Asteras Tripolis	1–0	PAOK	Tripoli
20:30 EET	Kourbelis (yellow card) 17' (yellow-red card) 90+2'; Sankaré (yellow card) 35' (yellow-red card) 90+4'; Iglesias 77' Manager: (Greece) Στάικος Βεργέτης	Report	(yellow card) 6' Tzavellas; (yellow card) 28' Kitsiou; (yellow card) 33' (yellow-red card) 90+5' Athanasiadis; (yellow card) 35' Tziolis Manager: (Greece) Georgios Georgiadis	Stadium: Theodoros Kolokotronis Stadium; Referee: Michail Boskakis

== Greek Cup ==
=== Greek Football Cup ===
==== Group stage ====
Pos	Team	Pld	W	D	L	GF	GA	GD	Pts	Qualification	PAS	KER	APK	PAOK
1	PAS Giannina	3	2	1	0	4	2	+2	7	Round of 16		1–0	2–1	—
2	Kerkyra	3	1	1	1	3	1	+2	4	Round of 16	—		3–0	0–0
3	Apollon Kalamarias	3	1	0	2	2	5	−3	3		—	—		1–0
4	PAOK	3	0	2	1	1	2	−1	2		1–1	—	—	

Source: epo.gr

Win Draw Loss

25 September 2014 1	Apollon Kalamarias	1–0	PAOK	Thessaloniki
19:00 EET	Akassou (yellow card) 14'; Efstathiou 18'; Bitsakos (yellow card) 43'; Baggelopoulos (yellow card) 81'; Vrontaras (yellow card) 90+4' Manager: (Greece) Makis Dandikas	Report	(yellow card) 28' Spyropoulos; (yellow card) 45+1' Pozoglou; (yellow card) 66' Golasa; (yellow card) 70' Pozatzidis; (yellow card) 76' Skondras; (yellow card) 82' Athanasiadis Manager: (Greece) Angelos Anastasiadis	Stadium: Kaftanzoglio Stadium; Referee: Xrhstos Mitsios

29 October 2014 2	PAOK	1–1	PAS Giannina	Thessaloniki
19:30 EET	Tziolis 57'; Vítor (yellow card) 87'; Athanasiadis (yellow card) 87' Manager: (Greece) Angelos Anastasiadis	Report	23' Ilić; (yellow card) 35' Garoufalias; (yellow card) 59' Avgenikou; (yellow card) 80' Gianniotis Manager: (Greece) Giannis Petrakis	Stadium: Toumba Stadium; Referee: Ioannis Delfakis

17 January 2015 3	Kerkyra	0–0	PAOK	Kerkyra
17:15 EET	Paraskevaidis (yellow card) 12'; Markovski (yellow card) 65' Manager: (Greece) Michalis Grigoriou	Report	(yellow card) 28' Konstantinidis; (yellow card) 59' Tzandaris Manager: (Greece) Angelos Anastasiadis	Stadium: Kerkyra Stadium; Referee: Alexandros Dimitropoulos

== UEFA Europa League ==
=== Play-off Round ===
Win Draw Loss

21 August 2014 1st leg	Zimbru Chișinău (Moldova)	1–0	(Greece) PAOK	Chișinău, Moldova
20:05	Burghiu 80'	Report		Stadium: Zimbru Stadium; Attendance: 8,530; Referee: Libor Kovařík (Czech Republic)

28 August 2014 2nd leg	PAOK (Greece)	4–0 (4–1 agg.)	(Moldova) Zimbru Chișinău	Thessaloniki, Greece
18:15	Pereyra 11'; Athanasiadis 45'; Mak 79'; Martens 84'	Report		Stadium: Toumba Stadium; Attendance: 14,843; Referee: Serhiy Boyko (Ukraine)

=== Group stage ===
Pos	Team	Pld	W	D	L	GF	GA	GD	Pts	Qualification	FIO	GUI	PAO	DMI
1	(Italy) Fiorentina	6	4	1	1	11	4	+7	13	Advance to knockout phase	—	3–0	1–1	1–2
2	(France) Guingamp	6	3	1	2	7	6	+1	10	Advance to knockout phase	1–2	—	2–0	2–0
3	(Greece) PAOK	6	2	1	3	10	7	+3	7		0–1	1–2	—	6–1
4	(Belarus) Dinamo Minsk	6	1	1	4	3	14	−11	4		0–3	0–0	0–2	—

Source: Soccerway
Rules for classification: Group stage tiebreakers

Win Draw Loss

18 September 2014 1	PAOK (Greece)	6–1	(Belarus) Dinamo Minsk	Thessaloniki, Greece
21:05	Nikolić 3' (o.g.); Athanasiadis 11', 16', 28'; Papadopoulos 50'; Tzandaris 90'	Report	Nikolić 80'	Stadium: Toumba Stadium; Attendance: 21,000; Referee: Mattias Gestranius (Finland)

2 October 2014 2	Guingamp (France)	2–0	(Greece) PAOK	Guingamp, France
19:00	Marveaux 47', 50'	Report		Stadium: Stade du Roudourou; Attendance: 8,783; Referee: Gediminas Mažeika (Lithuania)

23 October 2014 3	PAOK (Greece)	0–1	(Italy) Fiorentina	Thessaloniki, Greece
19:00		Report	Vargas 38'	Stadium: Toumba Stadium; Attendance: 20,000; Referee: Felix Zwayer (Germany)

6 November 2014 4	Fiorentina (Italy)	1–1	(Greece) PAOK	Florence, Italy
21:05	Pasqual 88'	Report	Martens 81'	Stadium: Stadio Artemio Franchi; Attendance: 10,000; Referee: Sébastien Delferiere (Belgium)

27 November 2014 5	Dinamo Minsk (Belarus)	0–2	(Greece) PAOK	Barysaw, Belarus
19:00		Report	Athanasiadis 82', 88'	Stadium: Borisov Arena; Attendance: 2,000; Referee: Robert Schörgenhofer (Austria)

11 December 2014 6	PAOK (Greece)	1–2	(France) Guingamp	Thessaloniki, Greece
21:05	Athanasiadis 22' (pen.)	Report	Beauvue 7', 83'	Stadium: Toumba Stadium; Attendance: 12,101; Referee: Kevin Blom (Netherlands)

== Statistics ==
=== Squad statistics ===
				Total				Super League Greece		UEFA Europa League		Greek Cup		UEFA play-offs		
N	Pos.	Name	Nat.	GS	App	Gls	Min	App	Gls	App	Gls	App	Gls	App	Gls	Notes
2	DF	Giannis Skondras	(Greece)		37	2		26	2	7		2		2		
3	DF	Georgios Tzavellas	(Greece)		23	1		13	1	4				6		
4	DF	Giorgos Katsikas	(Greece)		19			12		6		1				
5	DF	Răzvan Raț	(Romania)		39	3		25	3	7		2		5		
6	MF	Alexandros Tziolis	(Greece)		34	1		20		7		2	1	5		
7	MF	Eyal Golasa	(Israel)		33			24		6		3				
8	MF	Hedwiges Maduro	(Netherlands)		16	1		10	1	4		1		1		
9	FW	D. Papadopoulos	(Greece)		32	8		20	7	5	1	3		4		
10	FW	Facundo Pereyra	(Argentina)		42	13		30	11	6	1			6	1	
11	MF	Róbert Mak	(Slovakia)		35	8		25	7	4	1	1		5		
14	FW	Dimitris Salpingidis	(Greece)		31	3		22	3	8		1				
15	DF	Miguel Vítor	(Portugal)		41	2		29	2	6		2		4		
16	MF	Christian Noboa	(Ecuador)		17	2		14	2					3		
18	FW	Efthimis Koulouris	(Greece)		15			10				1		4		
20	DF	Ricardo Costa	(Portugal)		15			10						5		
21	DF	Nikos Spyropoulos	(Greece)		10			6		3		1				
22	DF	Dimitris Konstantinidis	(Greece)		15			12				1		2		
23	DF	P. Deligiannidis	(Greece)		1			1								
24	DF	Stelios Pozatzidis	(Greece)		7			5				2				
26	MF	Ergys Kaçe	(Albania)		39	4		25	4	7		2		5		
27	GK	Charles Itandje	(Cameroon)		26			19				1		6		
32	MF	Theofanis Tzandaris	(Greece)		29	1		20		6	1	3				
33	FW	S. Athanasiadis	(Greece)		41	18		26	11	8	7	3		4		
40	MF	Maarten Martens	(Belgium)		15	2		8		5	2	2				
50	GK	Asterios Giakoumis	(Greece)		1							1				
70	DF	Stelios Kitsiou	(Greece)		30			18		4		2		6		
71	GK	Panagiotis Glykos	(Greece)		24			15		8		1				
88	MF	Kyriakos Savvidis	(Greece)		9			4				2		3		
96	MF	Stelios Pozoglou	(Greece)		12			5		1		1		5		
	DF	Achilleas Poungouras	(Greece)		2			1						1		^{1}
	MF	S. Papagiannopoulos	(Sweden)		7			7								

Last updated: June 2015
Source: Match reports in competitive matches, superleaguegreece.net,uefa.com, paokfc.gr, soccerway.com
Ordered by squad number
0 shown as blank

=== Goalscorers ===
Rank	No.	Pos.	Player	League	Cup	Europa League	Play-offs	Total
1	33	FW	(Greece) Athanasiadis	11	0	7	0	18
2	10	FW	(Argentina) Pereyra	11	0	1	1	13
3	11	MF	(Slovakia) Róbert Mak	7	0	1	0	8
4	9	FW	(Greece) Papadopoulos	7	0	1	0	8
5	26	MF	(Greece) Kaçe	4	0	0	0	4
6	5	DF	(Romania) Răzvan Raț	3	0	0	0	3
7	14	FW	(Greece) Salpingidis	3	0	0	0	3
8	16	MF	(Ecuador) Christian Noboa	2	0	0	0	2
9	2	DF	(Greece) Skondras	2	0	0	0	2
10	15	DF	(Portugal) Miguel Vítor	2	0	0	0	2
11		MF	(Belgium) Martens	0	0	2	0	2
12	6	MF	(Greece) Alexandros Tziolis	0	1	0	0	1
13	8	MF	(Netherlands) Maduro	1	0	0	0	1
14	32	MF	(Greece) Tzandaris	0	0	1	0	1
15	3	MF	(Bosnia and Herzegovina) Tzavellas	1	0	0	0	1
Own goals				0	0	1	0	1
Other^{1}				3	0	0	0	3
TOTALS				57	1	14	1	73

^{1}Match on 25 January 2015 (Niki Volos) awarded 0-3 by FA decision.

=== Disciplinary record ===
No.	Pos	Nat	Name	Super League			Greek Cup			Europa League			Playoffs			Total			Notes
No.	Pos	Nat	Name	Yellow card	(yellow card) (yellow-red card)	Red card	Yellow card	(yellow card) (yellow-red card)	Red card	Yellow card	(yellow card) (yellow-red card)	Red card	Yellow card	(yellow card) (yellow-red card)	Red card	Yellow card	(yellow card) (yellow-red card)	Red card	Notes
33	FW	(Greece)	Athanasiadis	7	1		2			1			2	1	0	12	2		
5	DF	(Romania)	Răzvan Raț	7	1					2			2			11	1		
26	MF	(Albania)	Ergys Kaçe	7	1	1							2			9	1	1	
15	DF	(Portugal)	Miguel Vítor	7	1		1						1			9	1		
2	DF	(Greece)	Skondras	5	1		1			2						8	1		
32	MF	(Greece)	Tzandaris	7			1									8			
9	FW	(Greece)	Papadopoulos	7												7			
6	MF	(Israel)	Eyal Golasa	6			1									7			
8	MF	(Netherlands)	Maduro	5						1						6			
6	MF	(Greece)	Tziolis	2									3			5			
70	DF	(Greece)	Stelios Kitsiou	1						2			2			5			
3	DF	(Greece)	Tzavellas	1		1				1			2			4		1	
20	DF	(Portugal)	R. Costa	4												4			
16	MF	(Ecuador)	Christian Noboa	4												4			
11	MF	(Slovakia)	Róbert Mak	4												4			
21	DF	(Greece)	Spyropoulos	3			1									4			
22	DF	(Greece)	Konstantinidis	1			1						1			3			
10	FW	(Argentina)	Pereyra	1		1							1			2		1	
14	FW	(Greece)	Salpingidis	2												2			
96	MF	(Greece)	Pozoglou	1			1									2			
4	DF	(Greece)	Giorgos Katsikas	1												1			
71	GK	(Greece)	Glykos	1												1			
27	GK	(Cameroon)	Charles Itandje	1												1			
18	FW	(Greece)	Koulouris	1												1			
	DF	(Sweden)	Papagiannopoulos	1												1			
30	DF	(Greece)	Pozatzidis				1									1			
			TOTAL	87	5	3	10	0	0	9	0	0	16	1	0	122	6	3	

Last updated: 2015

Source: Match reports in competitive matches, superleaguegreece.net,uefa.com, paokfc.gr, soccerway.com
Only competitive matches
Ordered by (red card) , (yellow card) (yellow-red card) and (yellow card)
(yellow card) = Number of bookings; (yellow card) (yellow-red card) = Number of sending offs after a second yellow card; (red card) = Number of sending offs by a direct red card.
0 shown as blank
