= Dimitris Konstantinidis =

Greek footballer

Personal information
- Full name: Dimitrios Konstantinidis
- Date of birth: 2 June 1994 (age 32)
- Place of birth: Korinos, Greece
- Height: 1.73 m (5 ft 8 in)
- Position: Right back

Team information
- Current team: Pierikos

Youth career
- 2008–2012: PAOK

Senior career*
Years	Team	Apps	(Gls)
2012–2018	PAOK	40	(0)
2014	→ Aiginiakos (loan)	20	(1)
2016–2017	→ Omonia Nicosia (loan)	18	(0)
2018	Brescia	0	(0)
2018–2020	Aris	9	(1)
2020	Zemplín Michalovce	8	(2)
2020	Spartak Trnava	1	(0)
2020	Petržalka	1	(0)
2021	Olympiakos Nicosia	7	(0)
2021	Ionikos	5	(0)
2022–2023	Levadiakos	25	(2)
2023–	Pierikos		

International career
2010	Greece U17	1	(0)
2011	Greece U18	2	(0)
2012–2013	Greece U19	5	(0)
2013	Greece U20	5	(0)
2015	Greece U21	4	(0)
- * Club domestic league appearances and goals as of 20:30, 13 February 2023 (UTC).

Dimitrios Konstantinidis (Greek: Δημήτρης Κωνσταντινίδης, born 2 June 1994) is a Greek professional footballer who plays as a right back.

== Club career ==
=== PAOK ===
Born in Korinos, Pieria, Konstantinidis started his career at the age of 14 in the youth ranks of PAOK after being spotted by the club's grassroots staff. He made his unofficial debut with the first team just having turned 16 years, against Partizan Belgrade in a 2010 friendly game. Initially, Konstantinidis played as a right midfielder, but in the academies turned to be a fully right-back player.

On 26 August 2012, Konstantinidis made his league debut in a 1–0 home win against Panthrakikos. At the end of the season, he signed a five-year contract with the club. In the third UEFA Europa League qualifying round, he scored his first goal for his club, equalizing the score to send the club to the UEFA Europa League playoffs. In the 2012–13 season he made 18 appearances. In January 2014, he was loaned out to Aiginiakos before returning to PAOK after six months.

On 6 August 2015, Konstantinidis scored his first goal with the club in all competitions in a 1–1 away draw for UEFA Europa League third preliminary round against Spartak Trnava. On 10 December 2015, he assisted Róbert Mak in a 0–1 defeat against Borussia Dortmund in the UEFA Europa League group stage, earning him a selection to the best UEFA Europa League squad of the week. On 20 December 2015, Konstantinidis suffered a cruciate ligament injury during Super League home game against Platanias keeping him out for the remainder of the season. He returned to PAOK for the 2017–18 season, without making a single appearance with the club in the first half of the season.

==== Loan to Omonia ====
On 8 August 2016, Konstantinidis joined Cypriot club Omonia Nicosia on a 12-month loan deal from PAOK. He made 20 appearances with the club. On 26 May 2017, the club announced that with the end of the season the player would leave.

=== Brescia ===
In January 2018, Konstantinidis joined Serie B club Brescia rejecting a loan offer from financially struggling Panathinaikos. He joined manager Roberto Boscaglia's team as a free-agent, with the administration of the Greek Cup winners still keeping 30% of his rights in a future sale.

=== Aris ===
On 19 July 2018 he returned to the Super League, signing a two-year contract with Aris. On 9 December 2018, he scored in a 4–2 away loss against Atromitos. On 31 December 2019, he mutually solved his contract with the club.

=== Zemplín Michalovce ===
On 4 February 2020, he signed to the Fortuna Liga club Zemplín Michalovce, for an undisclosed fee until the end of the year. He became another Greek to play for the eastern-Slovak club, joining Georgios Neofytidis, Kyriakos Savvidis, Christos Kountouriotis and Dimitris Popovits. Playing as a right-back, he made his debut in the Fortuna Liga away fixture against AS Trenčín on 15 February 2020. His debut turned out disastrous as Zemplín Michalovce were destroyed with a 1–8 defeat. Konstantinidis also competed in three other games those had preceded the suspension of Fortuna Liga caused by the COVID-19 pandemic.

=== Olympiakos Nicosia ===
He signed for Olympiakos Nicosia in January 2021.

== International career ==
He was a member of all Greek national teams. At the age of 18, he was a starter for the Greece U20 team that participated in the 2013 FIFA U-20 World Cup held in Turkey.

== Career statistics ==
As of 15 March 2024

Appearances and goals by club, season and competition
Club	Season	League			Cup		Continental		Total	
Club	Season	Division	Apps	Goals	Apps	Goals	Apps	Goals	Apps	Goals
PAOK	2012–13	Super League Greece	15	0	3	0	0	0	18	0
PAOK	2013–14	Super League Greece	2	0	2	0	1 (Note: Appearance(s) in UEFA Europa League)	0	5	0
PAOK	2014–15	Super League Greece	14	0	1	0	0	0	15	0
PAOK	2015–16	Super League Greece	9	0	1	0	5 (Note: Appearance(s) in UEFA Europa League)	0	15	0
PAOK	Total		40	0	7	0	6	0	53	0
Aiginiakos (loan)	2013–14	Football League (Greece)	20	1	0	0	—		20	1
Omonia Nicosia (loan)	2016–17	Cypriot First Division	18	0	2	0	—		20	0
Aris	2018–19	Super League Greece	9	1	0	0	0	0	9	1
Zemplín Michalovce	2019–20	Slovak First Football League	8	2	0	0	—		8	2
Spartak Trnava	2020–21	Slovak First Football League	1	0	0	0	—		1	0
Petržalka	2020–21	Slovak 2. Liga	1	0	0	0	—		1	0
Olympiakos Nicosia	2020–21	Cypriot First Division	7	0	2	0	—		9	0
Ionikos	2021–22	Super League Greece	5	0	2	0	—		7	0
Levaidakos	2021–22	Super League Greece 2	16	2	0	0	—		16	2
Levaidakos	2022–23	Super League Greece	9	0	2	0	—		11	0
Levaidakos	Total		25	2	2	0	0	0	27	2
Career total			134	6	15	0	6	0	155	6

== Honours ==
Levadiakos

- Super League 2: 2021–22
