= Róbert Mak =

Slovak footballer

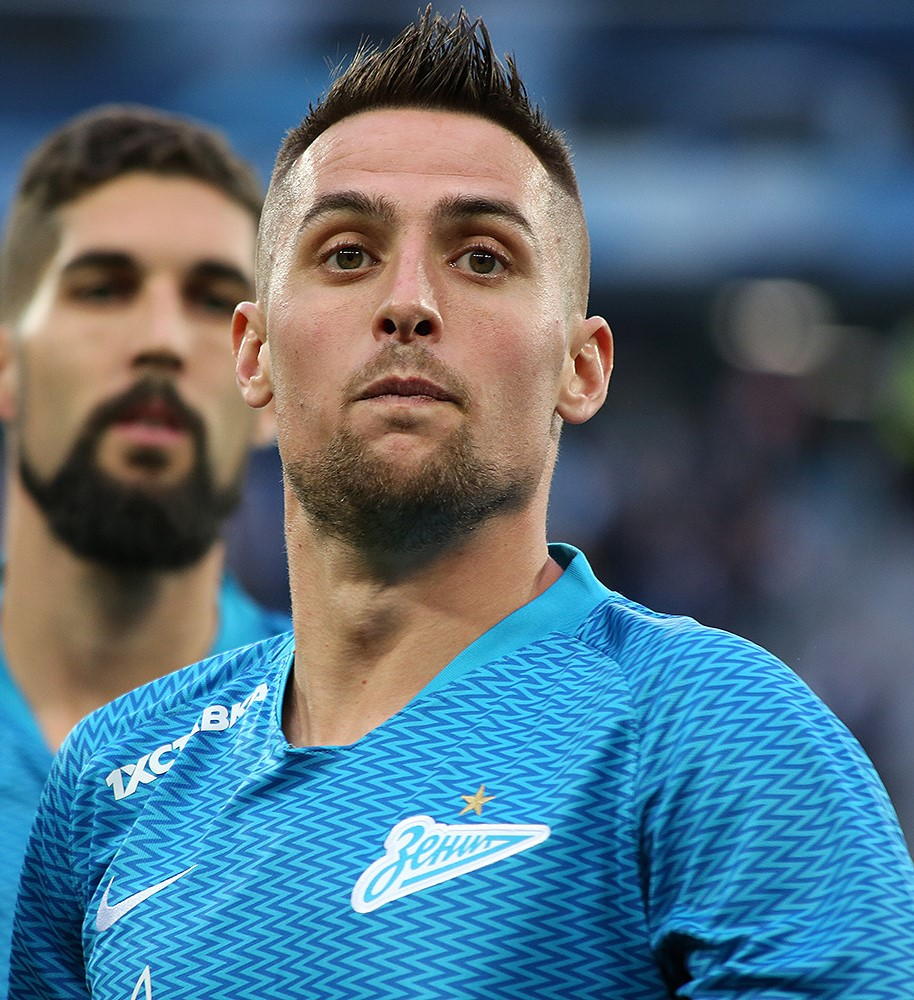
- Mak with Zenit Saint Petersburg in 2018

Personal information
- Date of birth: 8 March 1991 (age 35)
- Place of birth: Bratislava, Czechoslovakia
- Height: 1.80 m (5 ft 11 in)
- Positions: Winger; attacking midfielder

Youth career
- 1997–2004: Slovan Bratislava
- 2004–2008: Manchester City

Senior career*
Years	Team	Apps	(Gls)
2008–2010	Manchester City	0	(0)
2010–2014	1. FC Nürnberg	77	(6)
2014–2016	PAOK	58	(14)
2016–2020	Zenit Saint Petersburg	43	(6)
2017–2018	→ PAOK (loan)	26	(3)
2020	Konyaspor	4	(0)
2020–2022	Ferencváros	32	(4)
2022–2024	Sydney FC	53	(20)
2024–2026	Slovan Bratislava	57	(13)

International career^{‡}
2007–2008	Slovakia U17	18	(0)
2008–2009	Slovakia U19	9	(0)
2009–2012	Slovakia U21	20	(0)
2013–2024	Slovakia	81	(16)

Managerial career
- 2026-: Slovan Bratislava B (Assistant)
- * Club domestic league appearances and goals as of 16 May 2026 ‡ National team caps and goals as of 7 June 2024

Róbert Mak (Slovak pronunciation: [ˈrɔːbert ˈmak]; born 8 March 1991) is a Slovak former footballer who played as a winger.

Mak started his career at Manchester City, and later played for 1. FC Nürnberg, PAOK, Zenit Saint Petersburg, Konyaspor, Ferencváros, Sydney FC, before returning to Slovan Bratislava, his local club with whom he spent his youth career years at.

A full international for Slovakia from 2013, Mak represented Slovakia at the UEFA European Championship in 2016 and 2020, also scoring two goals to help Slovakia qualify for UEFA Euro 2024, their third European Championship appearance in a row.

== Club career ==
=== Early career ===
Mak, a native of Bratislava, began playing football at the youth squad of the local club Slovan Bratislava. When he was 13, he joined Manchester City Academy. There he played with his countrymen Vladimír Weiss and Filip Mentel. He progressed to Manchester City Reserves aged 17, but never got a chance at the senior squad. He is a 2007–08 FA Youth Cup winner.

=== 1. FC Nürnberg ===
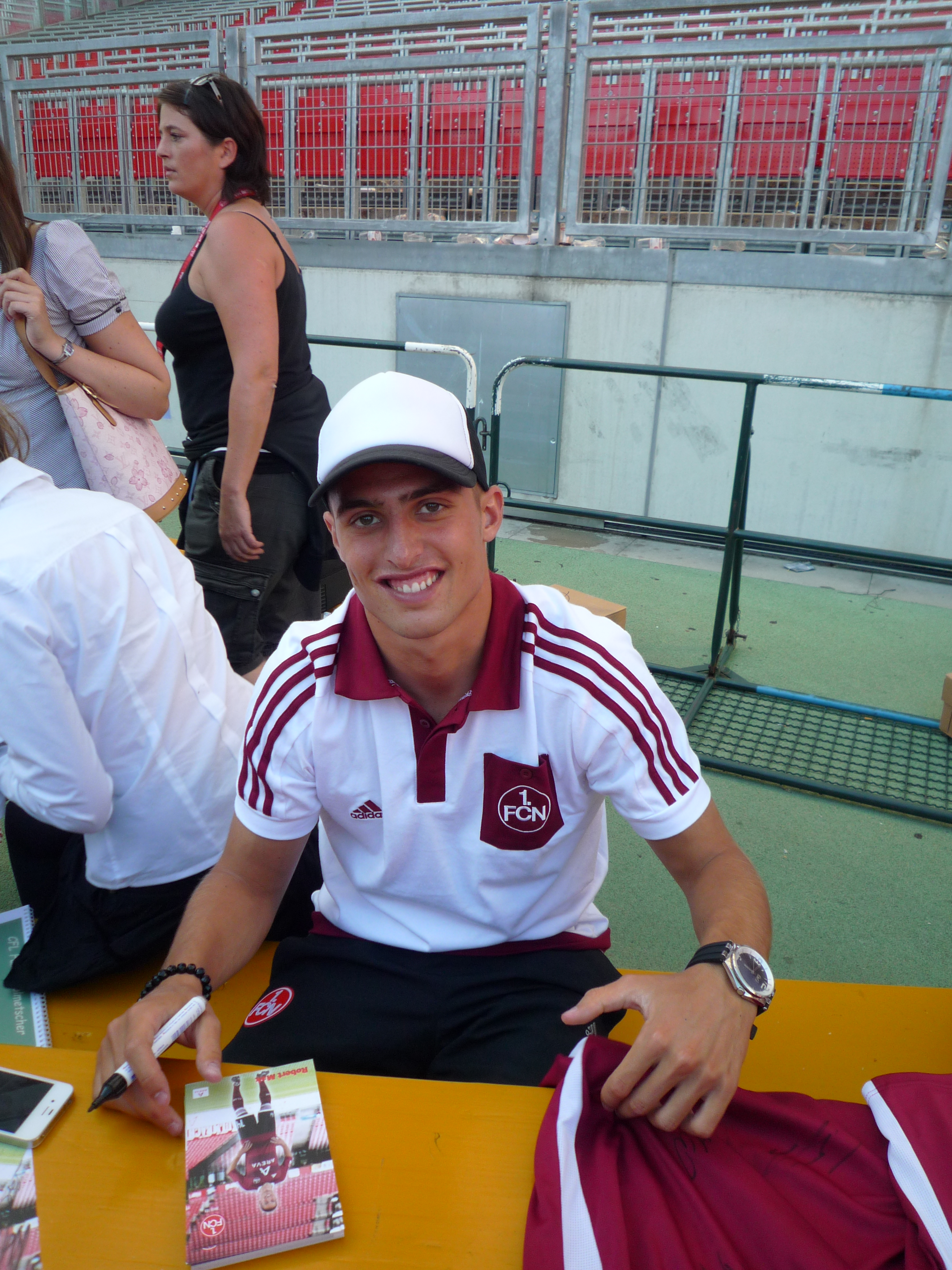
Róbert Mak with 1. FC Nürnberg in 2010

On 11 June 2010, Mak signed a three-year contract for 1. FC Nürnberg for an undisclosed fee. He enjoyed time on the pitch right from the start and completed the season in Germany's top flight with 22 appearances established himself as a dependable option on the right flank of the attack. He scored his first Bundesliga goal in a 3–1 defeat against 1. FC Kaiserslautern on 20 November 2010. He stayed in the club for four seasons, however their relegation to second-tier football coincided with the expiration of his contract. Legia Warsaw made an attempt to sign with him, but PAOK's offer and the opportunity to play in the UEFA Europa League brought him to the Toumpa Stadium.

=== PAOK ===
==== 2014–15 season ====
On 19 July 2014, he signed a three-year contract with PAOK playing in Super League Greece. He enjoyed time on the pitch right from the start, and helped PAOK to lead the championship until December 2014, but poor results made the club fall in the league table to third place. On 22 February 2015, PAOK returned to winning ways after beating Veria 3–1 which ended a disappointing period of bad results for the club. He completed the 2014–15 Super League Greece season with seven goals (third in his first season after Facundo Pereyra and Stefanos Athanasiadis) and five assists (second after Giannis Skondras).

==== 2015–16 season ====
On 16 July 2015, in the preliminary round of the UEFA Europa League PAOK was beaten 2–1 in the first leg in Croatia against Lokomotiva with Mak scoring the lone goal. In the second leg against Lokomotiva Zagreb, Mak scored a brace, with one of them being a right footed shot from more than 35-yards out, in a 6–0 win to advance. On 20 August, in the first leg of the Europa League playoffs against Brøndby IF, Mak had a hand in all five goals, as he netted a hat-trick, created the second goal, and teed up Garry Rodrigues for the third. On 12 September, in his third appearance for the 2015–16 season he scored his first goal in a 3–0 away win against Veria. Two weeks later, he scored in extra time giving his club the victory against Atromitos. On 1 October, in a home match against Borussia Dortmund in the Europa League, Mak contributed a 34th-minute goal in a 1–1 draw. In late October, it was reported that Mak was in talks with the club regarding a contract extension until 2019. On 5 November 2015, Mak reduced the club side's arrears in added time in a 2–1 away loss for Europa League against FC Krasnodar. On 30 November, he was substituted off the pitch in a 3–1 win over AEL Kalloni after sustaining a knee injury. On 6 December, he gave the lead by scoring the first goal in a 2–1 home win against Panionios. Four days later, he scored his ninth goal in this year's Europa League to force a surprise defeat on Borussia Dortmund, who qualified in second place from Group C despite the loss. Mak ran onto a Giannis Mystakidis throughball, knocked it beyond goalkeeper Roman Weidenfeller and cut home from a tight angle.

On 30 January 2016, he gave the lead to his club after an assist from Dimitrios Pelkas, in a 1–1 home draw in the 20th day of the league against Atromitos. On 4 March, after the episodic semi-final derby for the Greek Cup against champions Olympiacos, that never finished due to excessive episodes, Mak received four match ban and a €250 fine after his red card. On 11 April, in his return to action scored sealing a 2–0 home win against Levadiakos. After a good season with the club, PAOK, according to Real News, started negotiations offering to the player double wages on a new three-year deal.

After a successful UEFA Euro 2016 with the national team, Mak was no longer considered to be a member of PAOK, as the Slovak winger had farewelled all his teammates and the members of the club at the pre-season squad's hotel in Netherlands. The administration of the Greek club confirmed that there were three official transfers bids for him and he had taken leave of absence, in order to start negotiations with the interested sides.

=== Zenit Saint Petersburg ===
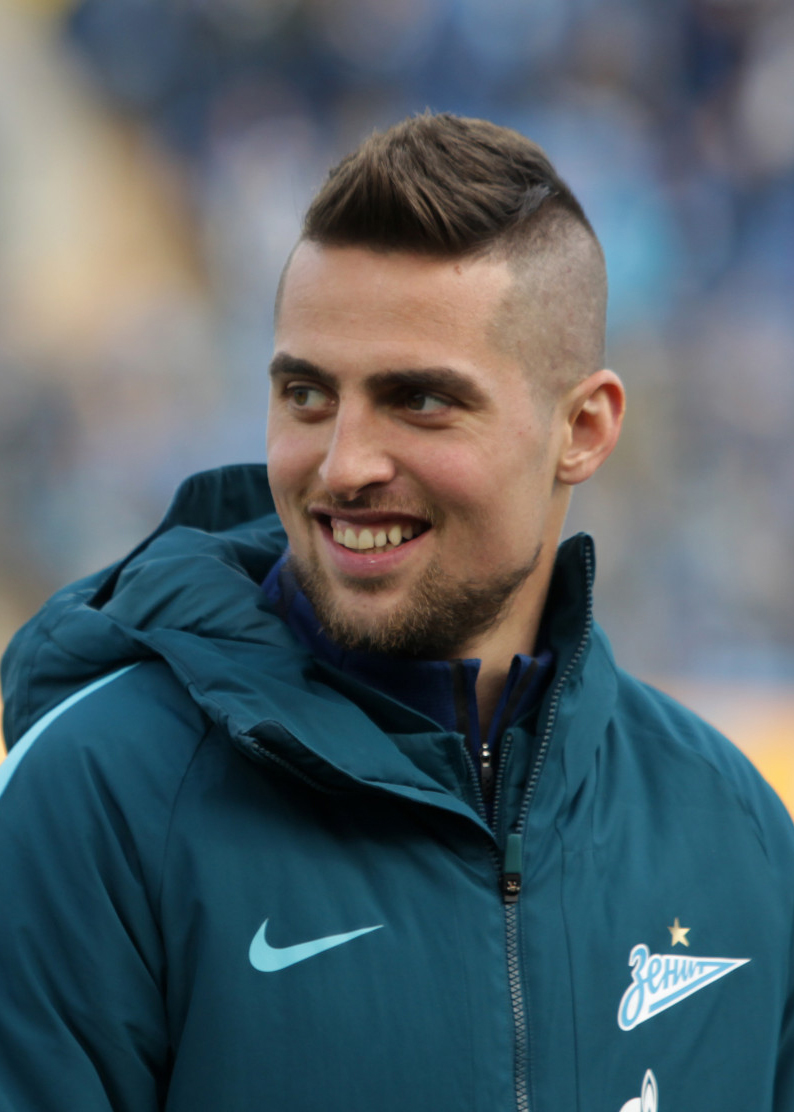
Róbert Mak with Zenit Saint Petersburg in 2017

On 22 July 2016, Zenit and PAOK officially announced the transfer of Mak to the Russian club, for about €3.5 million. The 25-year-old international, who had scored 20 goals in 45 appearances with the Greek club during 2015–16 season, passed the medical examinations and signed a four-year contract with the 2007–08 UEFA Cup winners.

Mak scored his first goal for Zenit on 11 September in a match against Arsenal. He came on the pitch on the 46th minute, substituting Oleg Shatov and scored 20 minutes later, on the 66th minute. Mak scored the third goal in the match, which Zenit won by 5–0.

After a poor season, despite a good early start, Mak was linked with a move back to PAOK for the next season on a loan basis. PAOK would cover 60% of his contract by paying €800,000 while the player's purchase clause would be set at €2.5 million.

==== PAOK loan ====
On 3 August 2017, Mak opened the score in a 2–0 home win game for the 2nd leg of UEFA Europa League third qualifying round against Olimpik Donetsk, after an assist of Diego Biseswar. It was his first goal after his return to PAOK. It was reported, that PAOK did not intend to sign Mak permanently in the summer of 2018. He scored five goals in 37 official performances in all competitions during 2017–18 season.

=== Konyaspor ===
On 30 January 2020 Mak's signing with Konyaspor was announced. After being advised by Zenit's manager, Sergei Semak, that his play time may continue to remain limited, due to high number of foreigners in the squad, Mak had moved to the Süper Lig side to maintain play time, to be of use for the national team. He was signed for half-season

He made his debut on 1 February 2020, in an away fixture against Antalyaspor. He came on as a second-half replacement for Farouk Miya. The match concluded in a goal-less tie. In upcoming fixtures, he also made appearances against Göztepe, Kayserispor and Kasımpaşa, being featured in the starting XI against the latter two.

In late March, during the COVID-19 pandemic, Mak had announced, that if tested positive he intends to terminate his contract with Konyaspor and travel to Bratislava, to reunite with his family, despite the agreement to keep the foreign players with their clubs. Mak feared further restrictions and the closure of the club's training center. He also claimed he didn't believe that the 2019–20 season would be completed. He was critical of authorities' late decision to suspend the Süper Lig season and enact pandemic spread prevention measures.

On 30 March 2020, it was announced that Mak and Konyaspor had terminated the contract by agreement.

=== Ferencváros ===
On 29 September 2020, he was member of the Ferencváros team which qualified for the 2020–21 UEFA Champions League group stage after beating Molde FK on 3–3 aggregate (away goals) at the Groupama Aréna.

On 20 April 2021, Ferencváros won the 2020–21 Nemzeti Bajnokság I season by beating archrival Újpest 3–0 at the Groupama Arena. The goals were scored by Myrto Uzuni (3rd and 77th minute) and Nguen (30th minute).

On 28 July 2021, he scored the third goal for Ferencváros against Žalgiris in the 2021-22 UEFA Champions League qualifying phase at the LFF Stadium. Ferencváros won the match 3–1 in Vilnius, Lithuania.

=== Sydney FC ===
On 9 August 2022, Mak signed for Australian professional football side Sydney FC. This came after a lackluster previous season for Sydney FC that saw them miss the finals and hence release numerous players to refresh the squad with international talent. After finding success in Europe and Sydney's need for a prolific winger, the move appeared a logical and much needed one. Mak scored his first goal for Sydney FC against Melbourne Victory on 8 October. This came in an unfortunate 3–2 defeat, with a former Manchester United star Nani providing an impressive performance that saw Sydney FC face defeat in their first game at the new Allianz Stadium. Mak's goal is also the first goal to be scored at the brand new stadium.

Following this, Mak provided numerous impressive performances for Sydney, including a goal in the friendly win against Scottish Champions, Celtic Glasgow on 17 November 2022.

After returning to Sydney following an impressive international break, having scored his first international goal for Slovakia since 2021, Mak would score his first brace for Sydney against Western United in an exciting 3–3 draw at home.

Mak concluded his stay with the Sky Blues in May 2024, winning 2023 Australia Cup with the side, scoring the winning goal of in the 3–1 victory.

=== Slovan Bratislava ===
On 10 June 2024, Mak's return to boyhood club and reigning Slovak champions Slovan Bratislava was announced. Club's manager Ivan Kmotrík Jr. announced the two-season contract highlighting Mak's "great football quality and determination to fulfill a dream of playing for Slovan at the new Tehelné pole stadium". Mak's signing was requested by the manager Vladimír Weiss Sr. Upon signing, Mak expressed his cordial relations with his youth club, life-long affiliation as a Slovanist, 2016 interview for the club television channel, in which he expressed the desire to play for the club, and laid out goals of a successful European campaign and a successful title defence.

In July 2026, Mak retired from football.

== International career ==
On 6 February 2013, Mak debuted in a 2–1 loss against Belgium, coming as a substitute for winger Miroslav Stoch in the 61st minute.

On 8 September 2014, in a 1–0 UEFA Euro 2016 qualifying victory against Ukraine, Mak led Slovakia to its first appearance as an independent country at the European Championship. On 17 November 2015, he scored his first two goals against Iceland in a pre-tournament friendly match.

Following Tarkovič's departure after the UEFA Euro 2020 and lower playing time at club level, Mak fell out of regular national team nominations in 2022, but was re-nominated by Francesco Calzona for the start of UEFA Euro 2024 qualifying campaign due to apparent shortage of wingers.

== Career statistics ==
=== Club ===
As of match played 16 May 2026

Appearances and goals by club, season and competition
Club	Season	League			National cup (Note: Includes DFB-Pokal, Greek Football Cup, Russian Cup, Magyar Kupa, Australia Cup)		Continental		Other		Total	
Club	Season	Division	Apps	Goals	Apps	Goals	Apps	Goals	Apps	Goals	Apps	Goals
1. FC Nürnberg	2010–11	Bundesliga	22	3	0	0	–		–		22	3
1. FC Nürnberg	2011–12	Bundesliga	17	2	2	1	–		–		19	3
1. FC Nürnberg	2012–13	Bundesliga	19	1	1	1	–		–		20	2
1. FC Nürnberg	2013–14	Bundesliga	19	0	1	0	–		–		20	0
1. FC Nürnberg	Total		77	6	4	2	–		–		81	8
PAOK	2014–15	Super League Greece	30	7	1	0	4 (Note: Appearances in UEFA Europa League)	1	–		35	8
PAOK	2015–16	Super League Greece	28	7	5	4	12	9	–		45	20
PAOK	Total		58	14	6	4	16	10	–		80	28
Zenit Saint Petersburg	2016–17	Russian Premier League	17	4	2	1	8	1	0	0	27	6
Zenit Saint Petersburg	2018–19	Russian Premier League	21	1	1	1	13	4	–		35	6
Zenit Saint Petersburg	2019–20	Russian Premier League	5	1	2	1	2 (Note: Appearances in UEFA Champions League)	0	1 (Note: Appearance in Russian Super Cup)	0	10	2
Zenit Saint Petersburg	Total		43	6	5	3	23	5	1	0	72	14
PAOK (loan)	2017–18	Super League Greece	26	3	7	1	4	1	–		37	5
Konyaspor	2019–20	Süper Lig	4	0	0	0	–		–		4	0
Ferencváros	2020–21	Nemzeti Bajnokság I	19	1	2	0	5	0	–		26	1
Ferencváros	2021–22	Nemzeti Bajnokság I	13	3	3	1	9 (Note: Six appearances and one goal in UEFA Champions League, three appearances in UEFA Europa League)	1	–		25	5
Ferencváros	Total		32	4	5	1	14	1	–		51	6
Sydney FC	2022–23	A-League Men	26	10	1	0	–		–		27	10
Sydney FC	2023–24	A-League Men	27	10	5	2	–		–		32	12
Sydney FC	Total		53	20	6	2	–		–		59	22
Slovan Bratislava	2024–25	Slovak First Football League	27	10	4	2	15	3	–		46	15
Slovan Bratislava	2025–26	Slovak First Football League	29	2	4	2	11 (Note: Three appearances and one goal in UEFA Champions League, two appearances and one goal in UEFA Europa League, six appearances in UEFA Conference League)	2	–		45	6
Slovan Bratislava	Total		56	12	8	4	26	5	–		92	21
Career total			349	65	41	17	79	23	1	0	472	104

=== International ===
As of match played 23 March 2024

Appearances and goals by national team and year
National team	Year	Apps	Goals
Slovakia	2013	7	1
Slovakia	2014	8	2
Slovakia	2015	9	4
Slovakia	2016	10	2
Slovakia	2017	7	0
Slovakia	2018	10	2
Slovakia	2019	7	1
Slovakia	2020	5	1
Slovakia	2021	10	1
Slovakia	2022	0	0
Slovakia	2023	7	2
Slovakia	2024	1	0
Total		81	16

Slovakia's score is listed first, score column indicates score after each Mak goal.

International goals by date, venue, opponent, score, result and competition
No.	Date	Venue	Cap	Opponent	Score	Result	Competition
1	15 November 2013	Stadion Miejski, Wrocław, Poland	7	Poland	2–0	2–0	Friendly
2	6 March 2014	Netanya Stadium, Netanya, Israel	8	Israel	3–1	3–1	Friendly
3	8 September 2014	Olimpiyskiy National Sports Complex, Kyiv, Ukraine	12	Ukraine	1–0	1–0	UEFA Euro 2016 qualification
4	12 October 2015	Stade Josy Barthel, Luxembourg City, Luxembourg	22	Luxembourg	3–0	4–2	UEFA Euro 2016 qualification
5	13 November 2015	Štadión Antona Malatinského, Trnava, Slovakia	23	Switzerland	3–0	3–2	Friendly
6	17 November 2015	Štadión pod Dubňom, Žilina, Slovakia	24	Iceland	1–0	3–1	Friendly
7	17 November 2015	Štadión pod Dubňom, Žilina, Slovakia	24	Iceland	2–1	3–1	Friendly
8	11 October 2016	Štadión Antona Malatinského, Trnava, Slovakia	33	Scotland	1–0	3–0	2018 FIFA World Cup qualification
9	11 October 2016	Štadión Antona Malatinského, Trnava, Slovakia	33	Scotland	2–0	3–0	2018 FIFA World Cup qualification
10	25 March 2018	Rajamangala National Stadium, Bangkok, Thailand	43	Thailand	2–0	3–2	2018 King's Cup
11	16 November 2018	Štadión Antona Malatinského, Trnava, Slovakia	49	Ukraine	4–1	4–1	2018–19 UEFA Nations League B
12	9 September 2019	Groupama Arena, Budapest, Hungary	56	Hungary	1–0	2–1	UEFA Euro 2020 qualification
13	15 October 2020	Anton Malatinský Stadium, Trnava, Slovakia	62	Israel	2–0	2–3	2020–21 UEFA Nations League
14	30 March 2021	Štadión Antona Malatinského, Trnava, Slovakia	65	Russia	2–1	2–1	2022 FIFA World Cup qualification
15	26 March 2023	Tehelné pole, Slovakia	75	Bosnia and Herzegovina	1–0	2–0	2024 UEFA Euro Qualifying
16	11 September 2023	Tehelné pole, Slovakia	78	Liechtenstein	3–0	3–0	2024 UEFA Euro Qualifying

== Honours ==
Manchester City

- FA Youth Cup: 2007–08

Zenit

- Russian Premier League: 2018–19
- Russian Super Cup: 2016

PAOK

- Greek Football Cup: 2017–18

Ferencváros

- Nemzeti Bajnokság I: 2020–21, 2021–22
- Magyar Kupa: 2021–22

Sydney FC

- Australia Cup: 2023

Slovakia

- King's Cup: 2018

Individual

- Peter Dubovský Award: 2011, 2012
