= Facundo Pereyra =

Argentine footballer

Personal information
- Full name: Facundo Abel Pereyra
- Date of birth: 3 September 1987 (age 39)
- Place of birth: Zárate, Argentina
- Height: 1.72 m (5 ft 7 1/2 in)
- Positions: Midfielder; forward

Team information
- Current team: Estudiantes BA

Senior career*
Years	Team	Apps	(Gls)
2006–2011	Estudiantes BA	121	(24)
2009	→ Palestino (loan)	6	(3)
2011–2012	Audax Italiano	34	(18)
2012–2014	San Luis	14	(4)
2013–2014	→ Gimnasia LP (loan)	33	(14)
2014–2017	PAOK	44	(14)
2015–2016	→ Gabala (loan)	14	(8)
2016	→ Racing Club (loan)	19	(2)
2017	→ Colón (loan)	16	(3)
2017	→ Necaxa (loan)	7	(0)
2018	Gimnasia LP	11	(4)
2018–2020	Apollon Limassol	39	(14)
2020–2021	Kerala Blasters	12	(0)
2021–	Estudiantes BA	29	(7)
- * Club domestic league appearances and goals as of 17:37, 17 July 2022 (UTC)

Facundo Abel Pereyra (born 3 September 1987) is an Argentine professional footballer who plays for Argentine club Estudiantes. He is a versatile player, who is able to play as an attacking midfielder, winger in both flanks, secondary striker and a forward.

== Career ==
=== Early career ===
Pereyra began his career at the amateur team of his country, Estudiantes de Buenos Aires in 2006. He remained in Estudiantes until June 2009, date when Pereyra left the club for the Chilean professional club, Palestino, joining to the club on loan. He made his professional at the First Division of that country, in a 2–1 win over Cobreloa, entering to the field in the 55th minute.

However, Pereyra only played three games, not scoring goals, which meant his return to Argentina to play again at Estudiantes de Buenos Aires.

=== Audax Italiano ===
Pereyra was training with the Argentine First Division club Godoy Cruz in January 2011. After of not pass the football test, was signed by the Chilean club, Audax Italiano.

On 29 January 2011, he made his Audax debut against his old club Palestino, in the first week of the Apertura Tournament. In his second game for the team, Pereyra scored a twice in a 3–2 win over Cobresal. The fat one (his nickname) became a key player of the team, being usually used as playmaker by the coach Omar Labruna. Pereyra scored again, in a 2–1 win over Colo-Colo, and in the 4–0 win to Santiago Wanderers.

=== San Luis ===
The fifth foreign player of San Luis, the Argentine midfielder Facundo Pereyra, will be presented with the team until January 12, 2012, as the official site of the club stated. "I'm settling down on the team, putting about and working on double session on the physical side to be as fast as possible to the technical," Pereyra said at a press conference. The Argentine midfielder said that he will help the club with its goals. Club's president Jose Antonio Roman, said that the player signed a three-year contract and expects to debut immediately.

Pereyra, played only few games with San Luis without making any impact, before he transferred on a loan to Gimnasia LP. Undoubtedly, Pereyra had a protagonistic role in the club during the 2012/13 season. But, unlike a year ago, when Gimnasia LP won promotion to Argentine Primera División and the name Pereyra became the talk up of several major clubs like San Lorenzo de Almagro and Racing Club de Avellaneda, the club made a major financial effort to keep him in the club, especially the last half, where alternated several ups and downs made from the coaching staff is now seemed that his priority is to play in Europe.

=== PAOK ===
PAOK announced the signing of Pereyra. The 26-year-old Argentine player penned a two-year contract, crossing the Atlantic for the first time in his career. He had two very good seasons at Gimnasia LP, scoring 24 goals in 66 matches. In 2012–13, he starred in the team's promotion to Argentinian top-flight football. His contract with Gimnasia LP expired in summer. However his deal with San Luis, which had been taken over by Jaguares de Chiapas, was still in effect, despite lodging a complaint before FIFA. After his letter of clearance was sent, the Argentinian signed his contract with the club. He scored his first goal on a home-game against AEL Kalloni after using a very nice pass. He is also known as Fanouris to PAOK fans. This is a nickname given to him by PAOK's ex-coach Angelos Anastasiadis, a devout Orthodox Christian, who mispronounced his name for a Greek-Christian one, probably being unable to pronounce Facundo correctly.

In December, in a title match against Olympiacos at Karaiskakis stadium, PAOK upset the odds by winning 2–1 to open a five-point lead at the top of the Super League Greece table and pose as a genuine challenger for the title for the first time in the last three decades. In front of 33,000 fans of Olympiacos, PAOK took the lead at the 43rd minute as a counterattack by Pereyra picked Dimitris Salpingidis; he passed the ball on to Giannis Skondras whose cross was not cleared by the Olympiakos defense to land on the feet of Stefanos Athanasiadis. The Greece striker opened the score with a tap-in, with the goal coming against the run of play. Five minutes into the second half PAOK restored its lead after David Fuster's equalizer, with a volley after a 40-yard through-ball by Ergys Kaçe.

On the training period and before the match against Lokomotiva Zagreb on July 16 in Croatia in the first leg of the UEFA Europa League, Pereyra along with Lucas Pérez Martínez have stayed out from the trip to Zagreb as PAOK coach Igor Tudor thinks that they are not fit enough. On 26 July 2015 Pereyra was probably on the list of players that are leaving PAOK, as announced by the club's manager Igor Tudor and Sporting Director Frank Arnesen.

==== Gabala (loan) ====
On 31 August 2015, Pereyra signed a one-year contract with Gabala playing on loan from PAOK in the top division in Azerbaijani Premier League. On 4 October 2015, he scored his first two goals for the Azerbaijan Premier League when in the 10th minute against Khazar Lankaran FK, Oleksiy Gai met the ball in the box after a Samir Zargarov cross from the right and Pereyra fired in from close range. In the second half scored in his double extending Gabala's lead to 5–0. On 30 November 2015, he scored in a 1–1 home draw against Ravan Baku FK. Gabala was losing since the first half and pushed all ahead to level and were able to struck this only in the closing seconds with Pereyra clinically finishing the cross from Magomed Mirzabekov in the right to equalize the score.

==== Racing Club (loan) ====
In January 2016 Pereyra was unveiled by Racing Club as their new signing, for the next 6 months. After a period of six months, Pereyra is eager to remain at the club and is trying to extend his loan deal. On 18 August 2016, in his second spell for PAOK, Pereyra scored as a late substitute in his first appearance helping the club to escape with a 3–0 away win against FC Dinamo Tbilisi in the UEFA Europa League playoffs.

He returned to PAOK at the beginning of 2016–17 season. On 19 January 2017, thanks to his brace, PAOK won 3-0 Levadiakos at Toumba Stadium of Thessaloniki. Pereyra named MVP of the game.

==== Colón (loan) ====
On 31 January 2017, Pereyra joined Argentine Primera División club, Club Atlético Colón on a six-month loan deal running to the end of the 2016–17 season, with a buying option of €600,000. On 26 March 2017, he scored his first goal with the club, sealing a 1–0 home win against rivals Lanús.

On 6 July 2017, the administration of PAOK announced the mutual termination of experienced Argentine attacking midfielder contract, as it was clearly that was not in new manager Aleksandar Stanojević's season plans.

=== Necaxa & Gimnasia LP ===
On 14 July 2017, he signed with Mexican Liga MX club Necaxa. On 10 January 2018, after six months in Mexican Liga he signed a six months contract with Gimnasia LP in Argentine Primera División.

=== Apollon Limassol ===
On 17 July 2018, he signed a two years contract with Cypriot club Apollon Limassol, returned to Europe after two years. In his two-year stay with the club, he scored 14 goals in 39 matches and left it in 2020 at the end of his regular contract.

=== Kerala Blasters FC ===
On 2 September 2020, he signed for Indian Super league club Kerala Blasters FC and became the first Argentine player to play for the club. He made his Blasters debut on 20 November against ATK Mohun Bagan FC, coming out as a substitute on the 86th minute. Pereyra found his first assist for the club in the 2–0 victory against Hyderabad FC on 27 December 2020, which was scored by Abdul Hakku. On 10 January 2021, he provided his second assist for the club as he set up for a goal set by Costa Nhamoinesu in the 2–3 victory against Jamshedpur FC. On 11 June 2021, it was officially announced that Pereyra has departed from the club.

=== Estudiantes (BA) ===
On 4 August 2021, Facundo Pereyra joined Primera Nacional club Estudiantes (BA) for the remainder of 2021 Primera Nacional season.

== Career statistics ==
=== Club ===
As of Match played 10 January 2021

Appearances and goals by club, season and competition
Club	Season	League			Cup		Continental		Total	
Club	Season	Division	Apps	Goals	Apps	Goals	Apps	Goals	Apps	Goals
San Luis	2012–13	Liga MX	14	3			–		14	3
Gimnasia y Esgrima (LP) (loan)	2013–14	Primera B Nacional	33	9			–		33	9
PAOK	2014–15	Super League Greece	36	12	0	0	6	1	42	13
PAOK	2016–17	Super League Greece	8	2	3	2	4	1	15	5
PAOK	Total		44	14	3	2	10	2	57	18
Gabala (loan)	2015–16	Azerbaijan Premier League	14	4	1	1	5	0	20	5
Racing Club (loan)	2016	Argentine Primera División	7	2	2	1	1	0	10	3
Colón (loan)	2016–17	Argentine Primera División	14	3	1	0	0	0	15	3
Necaxa	2017–18	Liga MX	5	0	3	0	0	0	8	0
Gimnasia LP	2017–18	Argentine Primera División	11	1	0	0	0	0	11	1
Apollon Limassol	2018–19	Cypriot First Division	25	11	3	2	8	0	36	13
Apollon Limassol	2019–20	Cypriot First Division	14	3	0	0	6	0	20	3
Apollon Limassol	Total		39	14	3	2	14	0	56	16
Kerala Blasters	2020–21	Indian Super League	10	0	–		–		10	0
Career total			191	50	13	6	30	2	234	58
