= Laurent Agouazi =

Algerian footballer (born 1984)

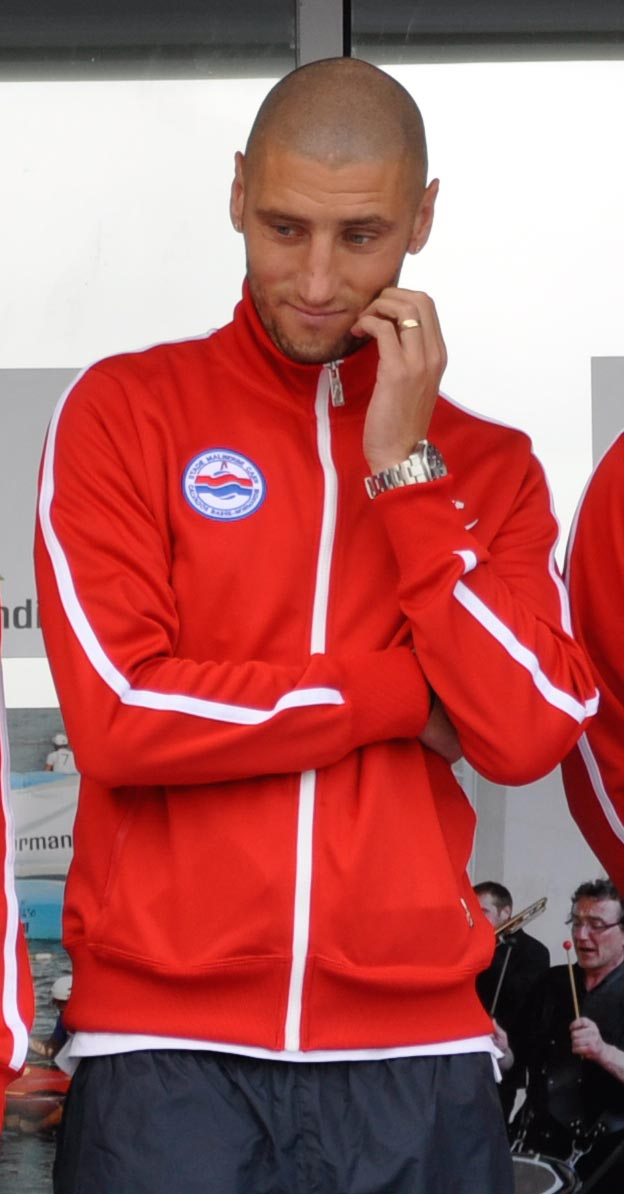
- Agouazi with Caen in 2012

Personal information
- Full name: Laurent Karim Agouazi
- Date of birth: 16 March 1984 (age 42)
- Place of birth: Langres, France
- Height: 1.84 m (6 ft 0 in)
- Position: Midfielder

Youth career
- 2000–2004: Metz

Senior career*
Years	Team	Apps	(Gls)
2004–2009	Metz	97	(8)
2004–2005	→ Besançon (loan)	34	(5)
2009–2011	Boulogne	52	(1)
2011–2012	Istres	28	(3)
2012–2014	Caen	47	(3)
2014–2015	Atromitos	17	(0)
2015–2016	Tours	29	(1)
2016–2018	Niort	54	(5)
2018	Racing FC	11	(4)
2019–2020	Metz B	4	(1)

International career
2013	Algeria	2	(0)
- * Club domestic league appearances and goals as of 11:49, 23 April 2024 (UTC)

Laurent Karim Agouazi (born 16 March 1984) is a former professional footballer who plays as a midfielder. Born in France, he played for the Algeria national team.

== Career ==
Born in Langres, France, Agouazi began his career with FC Metz and had a spell on loan with Championnat National side Besançon RC during the 2004–05 season. On 18 June 2009, US Boulogne-sur-Mer announced that it had the midfielder on a free transfer from Metz until June 2011. After two seasons with Boulogne he joined FC Istres, before moving to SM Caen on 8 June 2012. On 3 July 2015, Agouazi signed for Tours on a one-year deal. He signed a three-year contract with Chamois Niortais on 9 June 2016.

In January 2019, he returned to Metz to help the reserve team.

== International career ==
Born in Langres, France, to an Algerian father and French mother, Agouazi was eligible to represent both Algeria and France. In May 2013, he received his first call-up to the Algeria national team.

== Career statistics ==
As of matches played 11 May 2018.

Appearances and goals by club, season and competition
Club	Division	Season	League		Cup		League Cup		Total	
Club	Division	Season	Apps	Goals	Apps	Goals	Apps	Goals	Apps	Goals
Besançon (loan)	National	2004–05	34	6	1	0	0	0	35	6
Metz	Ligue 1	2005–06	8	1	0	0	0	0	8	1
Metz	Ligue 2	2006–07	31	4	3	0	0	0	34	3
Metz	Ligue 1	2007–08	32	0	4	0	2	0	38	0
Metz	Ligue 2	2008–09	26	3	1	0	4	1	31	4
Boulogne	Ligue 1	2009–10	25	1	3	2	1	0	29	3
Boulogne	Ligue 2	2010–11	26	0	1	0	3	0	30	0
Boulogne	Ligue 2	2011–12	1	0	0	0	1	0	2	0
Istres	Ligue 2	2011–12	28	3	2	0	0	0	30	3
Caen	Ligue 2	2012–13	21	2	1	0	1	1	23	3
Caen	Ligue 2	2013–14	26	1	5	0	1	0	32	1
Atromitos	Super League Greece	2014–15	21	0	2	0	5	1	28	1
Tours	Ligue 2	2015–16	29	1	3	1	1	0	33	2
Chamois Niortais	Ligue 2	2016–17	26	3	2	0	0	0	28	3
Chamois Niortais	Ligue 2	2017–18	28	2	1	0	0	0	29	2
Career totals			362	27	28	2	20	3	410	32
