= Stelios Pozoglou =

Greek footballer

Personal information
- Full name: Stylianos Pozoglou
- Date of birth: 22 January 1996 (age 30)
- Place of birth: Thessaloniki, Greece
- Height: 1.74 m (5 ft 8 1/2 in)
- Position: Winger

Team information
- Current team: Apollon Kalamarias

Youth career
- 2005–2013: PAOK

Senior career*
Years	Team	Apps	(Gls)
2013–2018	PAOK	14	(2)
2016	→ Karmiotissa (loan)	1	(0)
2017–2018	→ Panserraikos (loan)	35	(4)
2018–2019	Ethnikos Achna	1	(0)
2019	Thesprotos	13	(5)
2019–2020	Olympiacos Volos	14	(5)
2020–2022	Veria	52	(13)
2023–2024	Kampaniakos	28	(2)
2024–	Apollon Kalamarias	0	(0)

International career
2014–2015	Greece U19	10	(2)
- * Club domestic league appearances and goals as of 15 May 2022

Stelios Pozoglou (Greek: Στέλιος Πόζογλου, born 22 January 1996) is a Greek professional footballer who plays as a winger for Apollon Kalamarias.

== Club career ==
=== PAOK ===
Pozoglou made his debut with PAOK in the Greek Football Cup during the 2013–14 Greek Football Cup, participating in the win against Anagennisi Karditsa on 30 October 2013. On 12 December 2013 he scored deep into injury time in the UEFA Europa League match against AZ Alkmaar to draw the match level at 2-2. This goal made him, at the age of 17, the youngest player ever to score for PAOK in European competitions. In October 2014 he extended his contract with PAOK for 4 years.

On 8 January 2019, Pozoglou joined Thesprotos. On 21 July 2019, he joined Olympiacos Volos for an undisclosed fee. On 29 January 2020, Pozoglou joined Veria.
