= Christos Tasoulis =

Greek footballer

Personal information
- Date of birth: 3 May 1991 (age 35)
- Place of birth: Tripoli, Greece
- Height: 1.78 m (5 ft 10 in)
- Position: Left-back

Team information
- Current team: Panachaiki
- Number: 24

Youth career
- 2008–2010: Asteras Tripolis

Senior career*
Years	Team	Apps	(Gls)
2010–2011	Athinaikos	12	(0)
2011–2014	Fostiras	61	(3)
2014–2018	Panionios	91	(1)
2017	→ Lens (loan)	2	(0)
2018–2023	Asteras Tripolis	76	(3)
2023–2024	Ionikos	27	(0)
2024–2025	Iraklis	4	(0)
2025–	Panachaiki	6	(1)
- * Club domestic league appearances and goals as of 15 June 2025

Christos Tasoulis (Greek: Χρήστος Τασουλής; born 3 May 1991) is a Greek professional footballer who plays as a left-back for Super League Greece 2 club Panachaiki.

== Club career ==
=== Early career ===
Born in Tripoli, Tasoulis began his football career with local side Asteras Tripolis, youth teams. In the summer of 2010 he transferred to Athinaikos, where he played for one season.

He moved to Fostiras in 2011. In his first year in Fostiras, he contributed the club's championship in the 8th Group in Delta Ethniki, which led to the renewal of his contract for another year. Continuing his excellent performances with the club in Gamma Ethniki, signed a new two-year contract as a personal choice of the coach of the club Jacky Mathijssen. During the 2013–14, season he made the best year with the club, while scoring the winning goal in the delays of the last game that led the club to the playoffs for the rise in the Super League Greece.

=== Panionios ===
In 2014, Panionios announced the agreement with Tasoulis for three years. On 25 August 2014, he made his debut with the club, playing for first time in the Super League Greece in a 2–1 home win against Ergotelis. His remarkable season, except his first call in the Greece national team was the cause that the left-back is very high in the transcriptional list of many clubs including AEK Athens. On 11 December 2016, he scored his first goal with the club, in a 1–0 home win against Kerkyra.

==== Loan to Lens ====
On 7 July 2017, French Ligue 2 club RC Lens signed Tasoulis on a season-long loan contract from Panionios, and they intend to put a purchase option on the contract. The French club was among the favourites after a struggling season in order to be promoted to Ligue 1. Panionios earned €200,000 as a rent fee for the 26-year-old defensive, and the market clause set for next summer is expected to be around €300,000. Before signing with Lens, he extended his Panionios contract which would have expired in 2018 until 2019, since otherwise the Greek left-back would be free to negotiate the next step in his career as his own.

==== Return to Panionios ====
On 8 January 2018, Tasoulis returned to Panionios after lacking playing time at Lens.

=== Asteras Tripolis ===
On 20 June 2018, Asteras Tripolis officially announced the signing of the Greek defensive on a two years' contract for an undisclosed fee. On 20 July 2020, he signed a new contract, running until the summer of 2021.

== International career ==
His performances with Panionios, Claudio Ranieri gave him his first call up for the national team in 2014.
