= Ergys Kaçe =

Albanian footballer (born 1993)

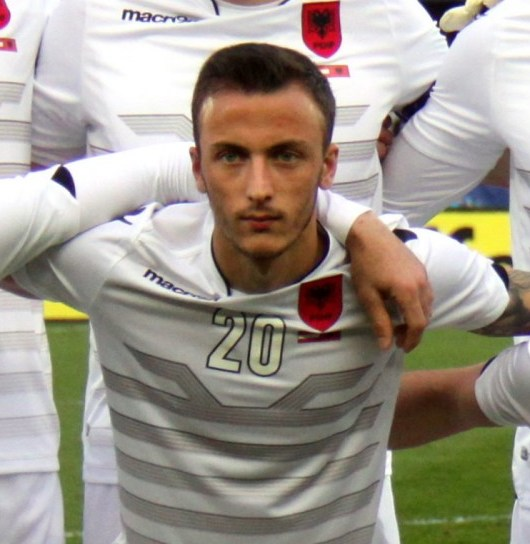
- Kaçe with Albania in March 2016

Personal information
- Full name: Ergys Kaçe
- Date of birth: 8 July 1993 (age 33)
- Place of birth: Korçë, Albania
- Height: 1.71 m (5 ft 7 in)
- Position: Midfielder

Team information
- Current team: Zakynthos
- Number: 26

Youth career
- 2001–2004: Achilleas Triandrias
- 2004–2010: PAOK

Senior career*
Years	Team	Apps	(Gls)
2010–2020	PAOK	113	(7)
2011–2012	→ Anagennisi Epanomis (loan)	19	(1)
2016	→ Viktoria Plzeň (loan)	4	(0)
2018–2019	→ Panathinaikos (loan)	30	(2)
2019–2020	→ AEL (loan)	19	(0)
2020–2021	Aris	12	(1)
2021–2022	Partizani Tirana	13	(0)
2022	Veria	19	(2)
2022–2023	Panevėžys	6	(1)
2023	Volos	12	(0)
2023–2024	Aiolikos	7	(0)
2024	Kalamata	15	(0)
2024–2025	Gjilani	7	(0)
2026–	Zakynthos	3	(0)

International career
2011–2013	Albania U21	5	(0)
2013–2019	Albania	25	(2)
- * Club domestic league appearances and goals as of 19 September 2026

Ergys Kaçe (born 8 July 1993) is an Albanian professional footballer who plays as a defensive midfielder for Super League Greece 2 club Zakynthos. He has been described by the media as "a classic agile defensive midfielder".

== Club career ==
=== Early career ===
Kaçe was born in Korçë, Albania, but moved to Greece at the age of three. He started his youth career at Achilleas Triandrias, from where he was transferred to the youth academies of PAOK in 2005 and signed his first professional contract in December 2010.

=== PAOK ===
Kaçe made his league debut for PAOK on 5 January 2011 during an away game against Panserraikos (1–1), coming on as a substitute for Stefanos Athanasiadis in the 68th minute. He didn't play another game for the first team during the 2010–11 season and instead he was featured in PAOK under-20's fixtures in order to maintain match fitness.

==== Loan to Anagennisi Epanomi ====
Kaçe was loaned out to Football League side Anagennisi Epanomi for the 2011–12 season. Soon enough, he was established in the starting eleven at Epanomi due to his consistent performances and finished the season with 19 league appearances and 1 goal to his name against Panahaiki, in a home game which ended 6–1.

==== Return to PAOK ====
After his return to PAOK, the club's new manager Georgios Donis seemed to trust him a place in the starting eleven, alongside other youngsters from the club's youth team. Kaçe featured in both legs of the 2012–13 UEFA Europa League third qualifying round against Bnei Yehuda, as well as in both legs of the play-off round against Rapid Wien.

On 31 October, the player renewed his contract for a duration of four to five years. The new contract came as an award for the good appearances that he made. On 3 March he scored his first goal for the club with a long-distance shot from 33 yards out against Panionios in a 4–2 win. Kaçe had a good season with PAOK, providing two assists and a goal in twenty-seven appearances.

==== The return ====
After serving his internal suspension, Kaçe returned to the team three months later. On 18 December 2013 he was included in the team for the match against Atromitos and he was an unused substitute for the match. His first match after the suspension came on 9 January 2014 against Iraklis for the Greek Football Cup, where Kaçe came in as a substitute, taking the place of Alexandros Tziolis in the 76th minute. In the league, after five consecutive matches at the bench, on 26 January 2014 he played his first league game after the suspension, against Veria where he played for the full 90-minutes. The match resulted in a 4–1 victory. He returned playing on 2013–14 UEFA Europa League knockout phase against Benfica on 20 February 2014, a 0–1 loss, were Kaçe played for the full 90-minutes. Kaçe scored a goal in the victory 3–0 against Panthrakikos on 23 February 2014. Also he was voted as Man of the match. Kaçe with PAOK advanced to the final of the Greek Cup, where they played against Panathinaikos on 26 April 2014 and lost 1–4, with Kaçe playing full 90 minutes and receiving a yellow card.

At the end of 2014–15 season, the Albanian midfielder had attracted much interest from abroad and he seems to be weighing up his options as he was coy when asked about his contract renewal and his future in the Greek club.“We have not talked about my contract extension. At the time being I'm a PAOK player but I don't know what happens next. We'll see. Only God knows,” Kace underlined.

==== Viktoria Plzeň ====
Kaçe was loaned out to Czech side FC Viktoria Plzeň. On 30 November 2016, he mutually solved his contract with the club.

==== Return ====
On 30 April 2017 he scored against Kerkyra in an easy win for PAOK.

==== Loan to Panathinaikos ====
On 31 January 2018, he was loaned to rivals Panathinaikos for six months, with a purchase option at the end of the 2017–18 season. Eventually, due to player's effort, PAOK after Panathinaikos' improved financial bid for the Albanian international agreed to extent his loan until the summer of 2018-19 season.

On 11 November 2018, Kace clipped the ball over Andreas Bouchalakis and then fired an audacious volley past José Sá, who got a hand to the ball but only succeeded in guiding the goal-bound effort in off the post, as the first 2018–19 season's derby ended in a 1–1 draw against Panathinaikos in the Karaiskakis Stadium. It was his first goal with the club in all competitions.

==== Loan to AEL ====
On 31 August 2019, the last day of the 2019 summer transfer window, Kace joined Super League Greece side AEL on loan for the season.

=== Aris ===
On 3 October 2020, he signed a two-year contract with Aris, on a free transfer.

== International career ==
=== Albania U21 ===
Kaçe made four appearances for the Albania national under-21 football team in a friendly tournament in Slovenia between 23 and 30 March 2011.

=== Albania senior team ===
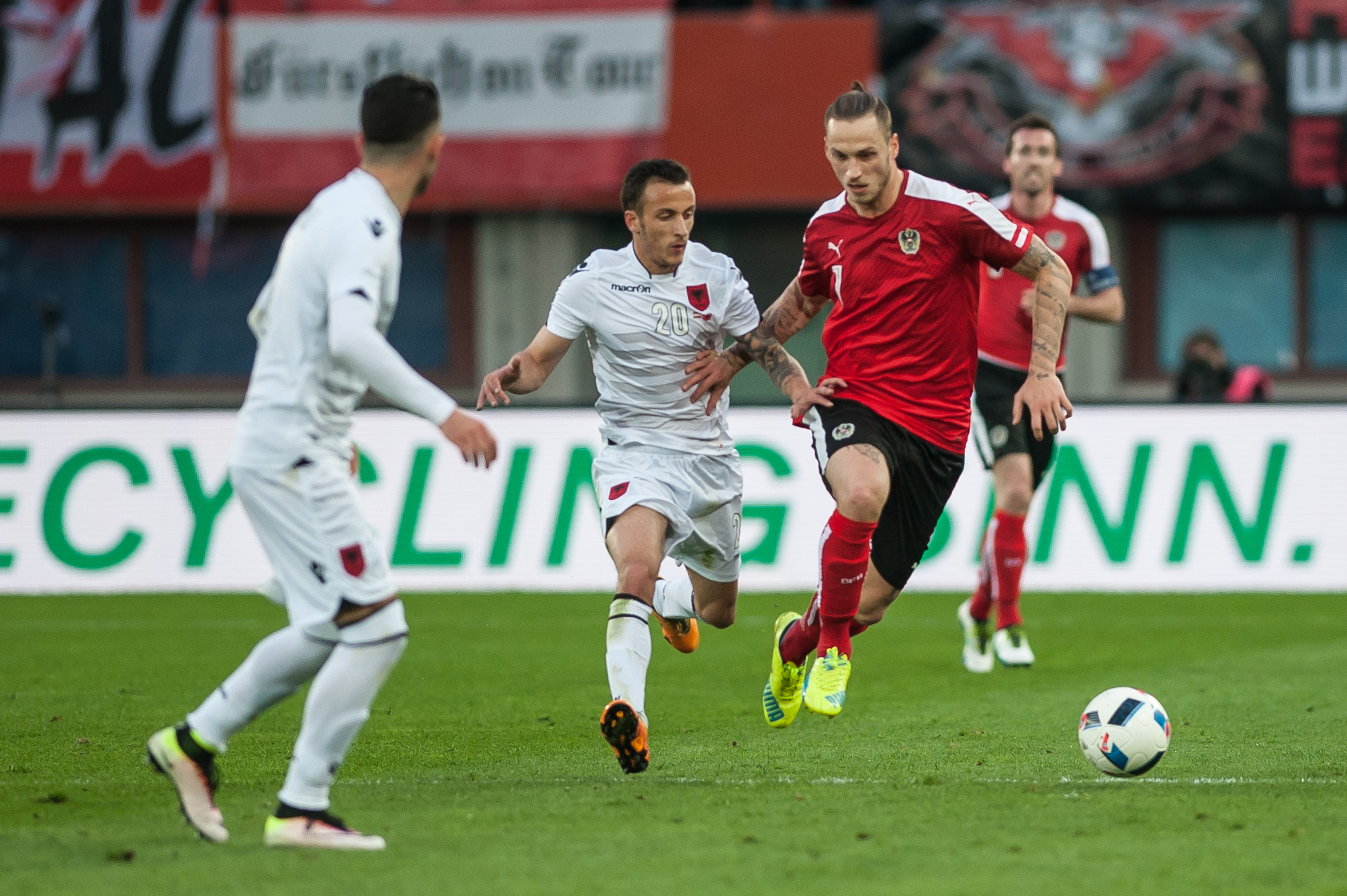
Kaçe (in center) in action for Albania in March 2016.

In an interview to Panorama Sport, a major Albanian sports magazine, Kaçe said that he is looking forward to play for the Albanian senior team. In early 2013, he cast doubt on this claim by refusing to be called up for Albania's friendly against Georgia and applying for Greek naturalization, and stating that he wanted to play for Greece. In March 2013 he was contacted by the FSHF where he declared that was yet undecided for his national side choose. However, Albanian and Greek media outlets suggested that Kaçe has already accepted the invitation from Gianni De Biasi, coach of the Albania national football team, to join the team for the upcoming game against Norway, in Tirana on 7 June 2013.

==== Debut and the 2014 FIFA World cup qualification ====
He debuted for the first time with Albania senior team on 7 June 2013 against Norway for the 2014 FIFA World Cup qualification by coming on as a substitute in the 85th minute in place of Emiljano Vila in a 1–1 draw.

On 14 August 2013, Kaçe scored his first goal for Albania in the 2–0 win of the Friendly Match against Armenia in Qemal Stafa Stadium, where his goal was the second in the 67th minute, 2 minutes after came in on the pitch in place of Migjen Basha.

In the 4 remaining matches for the Group E of the 2014 FIFA World Cup qualification in September and October 2013, Kaçe played every minute of all matches, as a central midfielder.

==== Temporary return at Albania youth U21 ====
Kace wasn't included in the published list of called-up players by the coach Gianni De Biasi for a friendly match against Belarus on 15 November 2013, because he was called up once again with Albania U-21 for the two matches against Hungary U-21 and Spain U-21 on 14 and 18 November 2013, valids for the 2015 UEFA European Under-21 Football Championship qualification. In the first match against Hungary U-21 he was named the national team's Captain and the match resulted as a successful 2–0 win for Albania in Budapest.

Kace then returned again with national senior side, as he received a call-up for the friendly match against Malta on 5 March 2014.

==== UEFA Euro 2016 qualification ====
In the opening match of the UEFA Euro 2016 qualifying against Portugal, Kaçe played as a substitute coming on in the 66th minute in place of fellow Albanian central-midfielder Burim Kukeli, in a match which Albania won 1–0. Also in the 3 other fixtures valids for the UEFA Euro 2016 qualifying Group I against Denmark and Serbia in October 2014 and Armenia on 29 March 2015, Kaçe participated from on the bench as the coach Gianni De Biasi played in the starting eleven with other trio of central-midfielders, consisting Burim Kukeli, Taulant Xhaka and Amir Abrashi.

On 13 June 2015 Kaçe scored a free-kick goal to give Albania the 1–0 victory over France in a Group I centralised friendly match. Being a friendly match, the coach Gianni De Biasi left out all 3 starting trio consisted of Kukeli-Xhaka-Abrashi and Kaçe gained the chance to play it as a starter among Migjen Basha and Andi Lila to consist the central-midfielders trio and his goal were scored at the end of the first half in the 43rd minute.

==== Euro 2016 ====
On 21 May 2016, Kaçe was named in Albania's preliminary 27-man squad for UEFA Euro 2016, and in Albania's final 23-man UEFA Euro 2016 squad on 31 May.

Kaçe played as a 62nd-minute substitute for Taulant Xhaka against Switzerland in a 0–1 loss and was an unused substitute in 2 next matches against hosts France where they lost 2–0 and against Romania in an Albania's historical 1–0 win with a goal scored by Armando Sadiku. Albania finished the group in the third position with three points and with a goal difference –2, and was ranked last in the third-placed teams, which eventually eliminated them.

==== 2018 FIFA World Cup qualification ====
Following some disagreement with coach Gianni De Biasi remained 8 months out of national team. He was returned to the national team for the Friendly match against Luxembourg on 4 June 2017 and the 2018 FIFA World Cup qualification match against Israel on 11 June 2017.

== Controversy ==
On 4 September 2013, Kaçe was involved in a political racist scandal after a photo of himself wearing a jersey with the symbol of the Kosovo Liberation Army (UÇK) was published on a Facebook page with his name. This sparked criticism in Greece and Kaçe came under fire in the media. Kaçe declared that he didn't know the meaning of the symbol having left Albania at the age of three. He also apologized. He was later criticised by the Greek neo-Nazi party Golden Dawn, which prompted a confrontation between PAOK fan clubs and GD, leading to a group of PAOK supporters to attack the headquarters of Golden Dawn. According to Albanian media sources, UEFA stated: "Don't mess with the player cause this isn't in your jurisdiction", whereas Albania national football team's Gianni De Biasi spoke to PAOK's chairman Zisis Vryzas, whom he coached as manager of Perugia, and asked to leave the player in peace, blaming a misunderstanding for the situation. Sali Berisha, former Prime-Minister of Albania, also came to Kaçe's defense saying: "Kaçe is a victim of racist nationalism" while PAOK's manager Huub Stevens accused the club of overreacting: "you're exaggerating much with that player". The head of the Albanian Football Association, Armand Duka, sent a letter to UEFA president Michel Platini claiming that the situation had been exaggerated. Kaçe apologised to the club but remained suspended. After he served his suspension time Kaçe returned to training, among rumours that the club was looking to sell him during the winter transfer window.

== Personal life ==
Following Albania's historic participation at UEFA Euro 2016, Kaçe was among the members of the national team who were issued diplomatic passports by the Albanian government in recognition of their achievement.

== Career statistics ==
=== Club ===
As of 10 May 2021

Club statistics
Club	Season	League			Cup		Europe (Note: Including continental competitions, such as UEFA Champions League and UEFA Europa League)		Other		Total	
Club	Season	Division	Apps	Goals	Apps	Goals	Apps	Goals	Apps	Goals	Apps	Goals
PAOK	2010–11	Super League Greece	1	0	—		—		—		1	0
PAOK	2012–13	Super League Greece	31	1	6	0	4	0	—		41	1
PAOK	2013–14	Super League Greece	19	1	7	0	4	0	—		30	1
PAOK	2014–15	Super League Greece	30	4	2	0	7	0	—		39	4
PAOK	2015–16	Super League Greece	21	0	2	0	10	0	—		33	0
PAOK	2016–17	Super League Greece	7	1	2	0	—		—		9	1
PAOK	2017–18	Super League Greece	4	0	1	0	0	0	—		5	0
PAOK	Total		113	7	20	0	25	0	—		158	7
Anagennisi Epanomi (loan)	2011–12	Football League	19	1	1	0	—		—		20	1
Viktoria Plzeň (loan)	2016–17	Fortuna Liga	4	0	2	1	4	0	—		10	1
Panathinaikos (loan)	2017–18	Super League Greece	10	0	—		—		—		10	0
Panathinaikos (loan)	2018–19	Super League Greece	20	2	2	0	—		—		22	2
Panathinaikos (loan)	Total		30	2	2	0	—		—		32	2
AEL (loan)	2019–20	Super League Greece	19	0	1	0	—		—		20	0
Aris	2020–21	Super League Greece	12	1	4	0	—		—		16	1
Career total			197	11	30	1	29	0	0	0	256	12

=== International ===
As of 11 June 2019

National team	Year	Apps	Goals
Albania	2013	6	1
Albania	2014	5	0
Albania	2015	2	1
Albania	2016	5	0
Albania	2017	3	0
Albania	2018	1	0
Albania	2019	3	0
Total		25	2

==== International goals ====
As of 13 June 2015. Albania score listed first, score column indicates score after each Kaçe's goal.

International goals by date, venue, cap, opponent, score, result and competition
No.	Date	Venue	Cap	Opponent	Score	Result	Competition
1	14 August 2013	Qemal Stafa Stadium, Tirana, Albania	2	Armenia	2–0	2–0	Friendly
2	13 June 2015	Elbasan Arena, Elbasan, Albania	12	France	1–0	1–0	Friendly

== Honours ==
PAOK

- Greek Football Cup: 2016–17, 2017–18

=== Individual ===
- Greek Super League Best Young Player: 2012–13
- PAOK FC MVP of Season: 2014–15
