= Theofanis Tzandaris =

Greek footballer

Fanis Tzandaris
Personal information
- Full name: Theofanis Tzandaris
- Date of birth: 13 June 1993 (age 33)
- Place of birth: Thessaloniki, Greece
- Height: 1.82 m (6 ft 0 in)
- Position: Midfielder

Team information
- Current team: Athens Kallithea
- Number: 32

Youth career
- 2003–2012: PAOK

Senior career*
Years	Team	Apps	(Gls)
2012–2015	PAOK	21	(1)
2012–2013	→ Anagennisi Epanomi (loan)	34	(2)
2014	→ Apollon Kalamarias (loan)	11	(2)
2015–2017	Olympiacos	0	(0)
2016	→ Panionios (loan)	11	(0)
2017	→ Koper (loan)	5	(1)
2017–2019	Panathinaikos	29	(0)
2020	Spartak Trnava	10	(1)
2021–2024	Lamia	110	(0)
2024–2026	Asteras Tripolis	40	(0)
2026–	Athens Kallithea	3	(0)
- * Club domestic league appearances and goals as of 20 September 2026

Theofanis Tzandaris (Greek: Θεοφάνης Τζανδάρης; born 13 June 1993) is a Greek professional footballer who plays as a midfielder for Super League 2 club Athens Kallithea.

== Career ==
On April 3, 2015, along with Giorgos Katsikas, he terminated his contract with PAOK, receiving his payment until the end of the season.

On 2 July 2015, Tzandaris signed a four-year contract with Greek champions, Olympiacos, whose latest intention is to invest in young Greek prospects that will develop into the team's core. Aiming towards this direction, the Greek club also signed Stefanos Kapino, Dimitrios Goutas, Dimitris Kolovos and Giannis Gianniotas, adding to the club's existing talent as the likes of Kostas Fortounis, Andreas Bouchalakis, Anastasios Avlonitis and Andreas Gianniotis among others.

On 19 January 2016, he joined Panionios on loan for six months, since he did not manage to earn a single appearance for Olympiacos in the Super League Greece. On 23 January 2016, almost six months after his last appearance in the Super League, he made his debut with Panionios in a 0–0 home draw game against Asteras Tripolis as a substitute.

On 6 February 2017, he joined Slovenian club Koper on a one-and-a-half year loan, until the summer of 2018.

On 24 June 2017, he terminated his contract with Olympiacos. On 21 August 2017, he signed a three-year contract with Panathinaikos as a personal choice of club's coach Marinos Ouzounidis. On 17 December 2017, he made his debut with the club in an away game against Xanthi. On 20 November 2019, he mutually terminated his contract with the club as he was not in the plans of Panathinaikos coach Georgios Donis.
