= Stefanos Athanasiadis =

Greek footballer (born 1988)

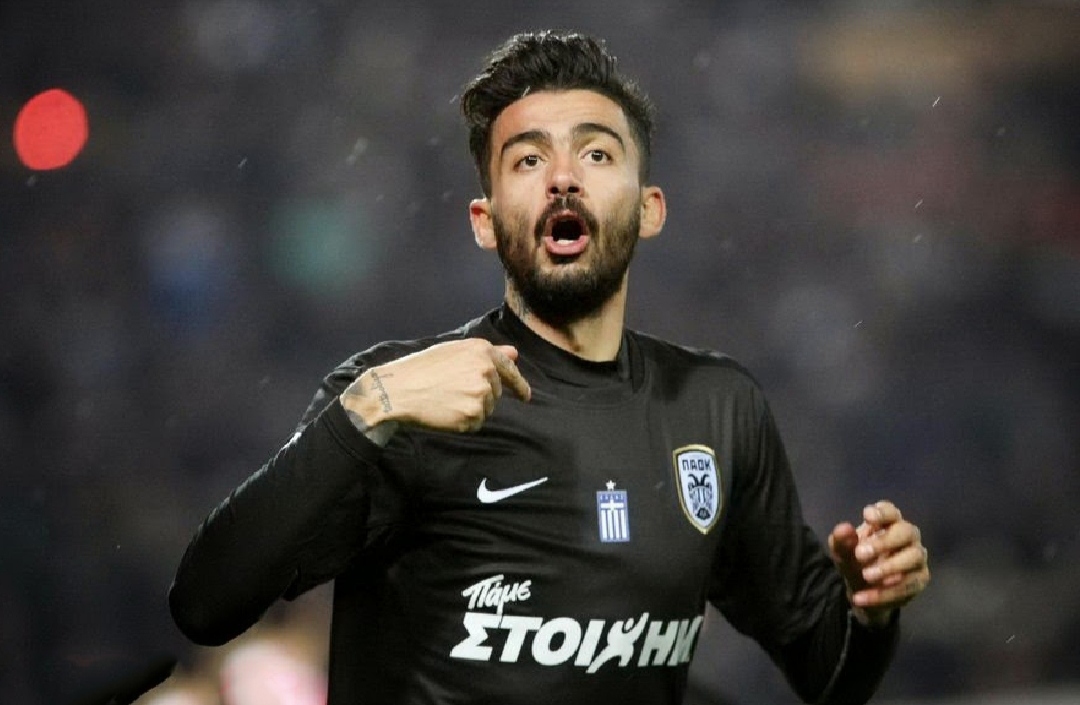

Personal information
- Full name: Stefanos Nikolaos Athanasiadis
- Date of birth: 24 December 1988 (age 37)
- Place of birth: Lakkoma, Macedonia, Greece
- Height: 1.85 m (6 ft 1 in)
- Position: Striker

Youth career
- 1995–1996: Digenis Lakkomatos
- 1996–1997: PAOK
- 1997–1998: Hertha BSC
- 1998–2007: PAOK

Senior career*
Years	Team	Apps	(Gls)
2006–2017	PAOK	208	(71)
2009–2010	→ Panserraikos (loan)	23	(5)
2017–2018	Maccabi Haifa	16	(1)
2018–2019	PAS Giannina	23	(2)
2020–2021	Apollon Larisa	24	(4)
2021–2024	Anagennisi Karditsa	61	(8)
Total		355	(91)

International career
2006	Greece U19	1	(0)
2008–2010	Greece U21	6	(1)
2011–2015	Greece	12	(0)
- * Club domestic league appearances and goals

Stefanos "Klaus" Athanasiadis (Greek: Στέφανος "Κλάους" Αθανασιάδης; born 24 December 1988) is a Greek former professional footballer who played as a striker.

== Early life ==
Athanasiadis was born in the village of Lakkoma, Chalkidiki to a footballing family. Both his father and uncle were footballers. He spent a season with the local team before moving to Thessaloniki.

In 1996, Athanasiadis joined PAOK's junior academy, initially playing as a central midfielder. His first chance to show his talent came two years later. Aged 10 in the summer of 1998, after participating with the PAOK squad in a youth tournament held in Trieste, Italy, he was approached by the local club and agreed to join their junior team. His stay at Trieste was short-lived, however, as both he and his family could not adapt to their new life. After only a month in Italy, he left for Berlin and his relatives, and joined Hertha's youth squad. Yet after another month in Germany, he left Hertha as well, to return to his native Greece and Thessaloniki.

== Club career ==
=== Early career ===
Athanasiadis returned to the junior squad in PAOK in August 1998 and worked his way through the ranks of the academy, showing his scoring abilities and talent with the ball, with the help of junior coach Kostas Malioufas, who established him as a striker. He moved to the Reserve Team in 2004. His hard work under coach Kyriakos Alexandridis was praised in the 2006–2007 season when he became top scorer with 24 goals, with PAOK dominating the Reserve League. His performances earned him a professional contract for three years.

He debuted with the first team on 24 February 2007 in a home match against Larissa, coming in as a substitute, with PAOK losing the match 1–3. Coincidentally, his first game as a starter for PAOK was again against Larissa at the last game of the 2007–2008 season where he scored 2 magnificent goals in the first half, with Larissa defeating PAOK again by 4–3. He also renewed his contract in 2008 for a further 5 years. He was working hard to find a place in the starting eleven, yet was overshadowed by more experienced players like Zlatan Muslimović and Lambros Choutos and was mostly used as a late substitute by Fernando Santos. On 29 November 2008 against Thrasyvoulos, Athanasiadis came off the bench in the 89th minute and went on to score the winning goal four minutes later, to win the match 1–2.

In 2009, he was loaned at Panserraikos as new strikers arrived at PAOK and he was not a part of Santos' plans. He needed to gain experience as a hot prospect for the future. He got 22 caps in the Football League scoring 5 goals. He scored a goal in the Greek Cup victory 3–1 over Olympiacos.

=== PAOK ===
In 2010–11 season he returned to PAOK. He got 4 European caps mainly as a substitute. He scored his first goal of the season at the first game played in the newly built AEL FC Arena as a substitute, giving PAOK a 1–2 victory over AEL. On 4 August 2011 he scored his first European goal with PAOK in the game with Vålerenga in a 3–0 Europa League victory. On 18 August he scored again, this time against Karpaty Lviv. On 30 November he scored against Tottenham Hotspur, with the second goal for PAOK in a surprise 2–1 victory at White Hart Lane in the Europa League, when he met a low cross from Giorgios Georgiadis.

In 2012–13 season he scored goals in matches against fierce rivals Aris and AEK Athens while also scoring the equalizer in a 1–1 home draw against Olympiacos. Athanasiadis scored his first hat-trick against Kallithea on 24 January 2013 in a 6–0 win. After the departure of Pablo Garcia he was named vice-captain of the club behind Dimitris Salpingidis, wearing the captain's armbrand on many occasions. On 17 April 2013 he went on to give an assist and score a goal against Asteras Tripolis in the first leg of the Greek Cup semi-finals.

He entered the 2013–14 season by scoring in a 3–0 home win against Skoda Xanthi.

On 12 September 2014, Athanasiadis renew his contract with PAOK till the summer of 2018. He now had a huge contract, one of the two largest in the roster, his annual salary more than tripled (from €180,000 to more than €700,000 per year!). Athanasiadis stated: "I'm happy because I closed an issue that had taken time to resolve. With my signature I think not only me but the entire family of PAOK are happy", and continued: "I want to thank some people who helped make this happened. The major shareholder Mr. Savvidis, the technical director Zisis Vryzas and the president of the club."

On 18 September 2014, he scored an 18-minute hat-trick in a 6–1 home win against Dinamo Minsk in the Europa League group stage. This made him the first ever player to score a hat-trick for PAOK in a European match. He added another two against the same opposition away on 27 November, scoring late goals in the 82nd and 88th minutes to win the game for PAOK. On 11 December he scored a penalty to equalise in a home group game against Guingamp for his sixth of the tournament, but the French team won 2-1 and advanced at PAOK's expense.

On 4 July 2015, during a friendly game in the training period, he suffered an overwhelming intra-articular fracture of the first toe of the right foot, that caused him (according to the officials' reports) an absence of approximately 4 to 6 weeks. On 12 September 2015, he returned to the starting XI in the third day of the Super League Greece in an away 3–0 win against Veria, by scoring the first goal. Athanassiadis, with this goal against Veria, made it four consecutive seasons he had scored in his first game of the Super League. On 23 September 2015, he scored the winning goal with a penalty kick in a home derby against rivals AEK Athens. On 30 November 2015, a brace from Athanasiadis helped PAOK win 3-1 AEL Kalloni at Mytilini, with Giannis Mystakidis also scoring in the last minute of the game. The home team had temporarily equalized with a penalty kick by captain Yiorghos Manousos. On 20 December 2015, with a penalty kick he scored the goal to give PAOK a hard-fought 1–0 home win against brave Platanias, who had created many chances to equalize. On 17 January 2015, Athanasiadis' goal against Veria in the Super League was the 100th official for the Greek striker in less than eight years after his first in April 2008. On 13 February 2016, according to medical staff Athanasiadis suffered a hamstring strain injury during Greek Cup match against Panionios and will remain out of action for 15–18 days. According to Super League Greece statistics, Athanasiadis was shown 49 yellow cards between 2012 and 2016, an incredible number considering that he played mainly as striker. On 26 May 2016 he scored a brace in a 2–0 home win against Panionios in the play-offs exceeding 100 goals in PAOK colours in all competitions. On 3 August 2016 he scored against Ajax in the Uefa Champions League 3rd qualifying round. However, his team lost 2-1 and got knocked out of the competition. On 29 September 2016, Athanasiadis netted both goals as PAOK recovered from a nightmare start in the Europa League group stage against FC Slovan Liberec when Russian Nikolay Komlichenko scored the opening goal for Slovan in 41 seconds. He finished the 2016-17 season without being able to score for the club in the Super league. The last time a first-choice striker went a full season for the club without scoring was 1978 with Georgios Kostikos. He started the 2017–18 season as a late substitute in a 3–1 home win game against Östersunds FK at Toumba Stadium in the first leg of the Europa League play-offs.

=== Maccabi Haifa ===
On 22 August 2017, Athanasiadis completed his move to Maccabi Haifa. The 28-year-old Greek International was released from PAOK and signed a 2-year deal with the Israeli club. He was reportedly set to earn €550,000 per year, plus bonuses. On 21 October 2017, he scored his first goal with the club in the last minute of the game, coming as a substitute in a 2–1 home loss against Beitar Jerusalem. On 8 January 2018, Athanasiadis netted home the winning penalty to send Maccabi Haifa to the Last 16 of the Israeli State Cup. He had had a disappointing spell in Israel since joining the club over the summer, but was the hero on this game for the Haifa side. On 23 August 2018, after a rather mediocre season, he mutual solved his contract with the club.

=== PAS Giannina ===
On 7 September 2018, after his departure from Maccabi Haifa, Athanasiadis eventually found himself a new club, penning a two-year deal with PAS Giannina. On 1 December 2018, after a cross to the left from Georgios Pamlidis, Athanasiadis scored, sealing a 1–1 home draw against OFI Crete F.C., his first goals in the Greek top flight since May 2016 (two goals against Panionios with PAOK) and after a 32-game goal drought in the Super League. On 9 February 2019, he scored after Alexandros Nikolias’ cross left Pananthinaikos goalie Sokratis Dioudis with no chance to react to a clinical header, sealing a vital 1-0 home win game in his club's effort to avoid relegation. On 26 June 2019, he mutually dissolved his contract with the club.

=== Later years ===
On 22 October 2020, Athanasiadis who had last played in the Greek second division for Panserraikos F.C. in the 2009-10 season, joined Apollon Larissa. The 32-year-old striker was without a team for over a year. On 18 August 2021 he signed a contract with Super League Greece 2 club Anagennisi Karditsa

== International career ==
On 8 June 2011 Athanasiadis made his debut for the Greece national team in a friendly 1–1 draw against Ecuador. He earned 12 caps during his career.

== Club statistics ==
As of 20 December 2021.

Club	Season	League			Cup		Continental		Total	
Club	Season	Division	Apps	Goals	Apps	Goals	Apps	Goals	Apps	Goals
PAOK	2006–07	Super League Greece	1	0	0	0	0	0	1	0
PAOK	2007–08	Super League Greece	4	2	0	0	0	0	4	2
PAOK	2008–09	Super League Greece	10	2	4	0	0	0	14	2
PAOK	Total		15	4	4	0	0	0	19	4
Panserraikos (loan)	2009–10	Football League	23	5	3	1	—	—	26	6
PAOK	2010–11	Super League Greece	21	6	2	1	5	0	28	7
PAOK	2011–12	Super League Greece	31	12	3	1	11	4	45	17
PAOK	2012–13	Super League Greece	32	14	6	5	4	4	42	23
PAOK	2013–14	Super League Greece	29	10	6	5	12	2	47	17
PAOK	2014–15	Super League Greece	30	11	3	0	8	7	41	18
PAOK	2015–16	Super League Greece	28	14	6	1	4	0	36	15
PAOK	2016–17	Super League Greece	22	0	3	2	8	3	33	5
PAOK	2017–18	Super League Greece	0	0	0	0	1	0	1	0
PAOK	Total		193	67	29	15	53	20	275	102
Maccabi Haifa	2017–18	Israeli Premier League	16	1	4	0	0	0	20	1
PAS Giannina	2018–19	Super League Greece	23	2	5	0	—	—	28	2
Apollon Larissa	2020–21	Super League Greece 2	24	4	—	—	—	—	24	4
Anagennisi Karditsa	2021–22	Super League Greece 2	11	2	4	2	—	—	15	4
Career Total			299	84	45	16	53	20	397	120

== Honours ==
PAOK

- Greek Cup: 2016–17

Individual

- Greek Cup top scorer: 2012–13
- Super League Best Goal Day 8: 2014–15
- Super League MVP Day 9: 2014–15
- PAOK Best Goal October: 2014–15
- PAOK MVP November: 2014–15
- PAOK MVP March: 2014–15
- PAOK's Alltime topscorer in European competitions (20 goals)
