= 2009–10 PAOK FC season =

PAOK FC
2009–10 season
- Chairman: Theodoros Zagorakis
- Manager: Fernando Santos
- Super League Greece: 2nd (3rd in regular season)
- Greek Cup: Quarter-finals
- UEFA Europa League: Play-off round
- Top goalscorer: League: Vladimir Ivić (9); All: Vladimir Ivić (10)
Home colours	Away colours	Third colours

The 2009–10 season is PAOK FC's 51st consecutive season in the Super League Greece. They have qualified for the UEFA Europa League third qualifying round for the 2009–10 season.

== Players ==
=== Squad information ===
N	Pos.	Nat.	Name	Age	EU	Since	App	Goals	Ends	Transfer fee	Notes
1	GK	(Greece)	Chalkias (VC1)	52	EU	2008	30	0	2010	Free	
2	DF	(Greece)	Arabatzis	42	EU	2006	47	1	2012	Free	
5	MF	(Spain) (Uruguay)	García	49	EU	2008	19	0	2010	Free	
6	MF	(Spain)	Vitolo	43	EU	2009	0	0	2013	Free	
7	MF	(Portugal)	Conceição (Captain)	52	EU	2008	32	6	2010	Free	
8	DF	(Italy)	Cirillo	49	EU	2009	1	0	2011	Free	
9	FW	(Greece)	Anastasakos	48	EU	2008	13	7	2010	Free	
10	MF	(France)	Sorlin	47	EU	2009	13	1	2011	€0.3M	
11	FW	(Sweden) (Bosnia and Herzegovina)	Muslimović	45	EU	2008	23	8	2011	€0.5M	
13	DF	(Greece)	Malezas (VC3)	41	EU	2005	48	2	2013	Youth system	
14	FW	(Greece)	Papazoglou	38	EU	2009	0	0	2013	Free	
15	DF	(Spain) (Chile)	Contreras (VC2)	48	EU	2008	23	2	2013	Free	
16	MF	(Brazil)	Lino	49	Non-EU	2009	13	1	2010	Free	
18	MF	(Greece)	Fotakis	45	EU	2009	1	0	2013	Free	
19	MF	(Greece)	Koutsianikoulis	38	EU	2009	0	0	2013	€1.2M	
20	MF	(Portugal)	Vieirinha	40	EU	2008	16	1	2013	€0.37M	
21	MF	(Serbia)	Ivić	49	EU	2008	24	8	2010	Free	
22	MF	(Peru) (Argentina)	Verón	45	EU	2008	36	0	2011	€0.13M	
27	DF	(Poland)	Sznaucner	47	EU	2007	44	0	2012	Free	
28	MF	(Ghana)	Abubakari	40	Non-EU	2009	0	0	2013	Free	
30	GK	(Greece)	Koutzavasilis	37	EU	2009	0	0	2013	Youth system	
31	FW	(Italy) (Argentina)	Filomeno	46	EU	2009	1	0	2011	Free	
36	DF	(Italy)	Savini	47	EU	2009	0	0	2011	Free	
77	DF	(Greece)	Karapiperis	42	EU	2006	47	1	2012	Free	
80	DF	(Italy) (Uruguay)	Bizera	46	EU	2008	10	0	2011	Free	
91	GK	(Croatia)	Krešić	42	EU	2009	0	0	2013	Free	

- Last updated: 30 July

=== Players in / out ===
==== In ====
No.	Pos.	Nat.	Name	Age	EU	Moving from	Type	Transfer window	Ends	Transfer fee	Source
19	DF	(Greece)	Koutsianikoulis	20	EU	Ergotelis	Transfer	Summer	2013	€1.2M	
28	MF	(Ghana)	Abubakari	23	Non-EU	Panserraikos	Transfer	Summer	2013	Free	
91	GK	(Croatia)	Krešić	25	EU	Panionios	Transfer	Summer	2013	Free	
14	FW	(Greece)	Papazoglou	21	EU	Aris	Transfer	Summer	2013	Free	
18	MF	(Greece)	Fotakis	27	EU	Larissa	Transfer	Summer	2013	Free	
10	MF	(France)	Sorlin	47	EU	Rennes (France)	Transfer	Summer	2011	€0.3M	
8	DF	(Italy)	Cirillo	32	EU	Reggina (Italy)	Transfer	Summer	2011	Free	
31	FW	(Italy) (Argentina)	Filomeno	29	EU	Asteras Tripolis	Transfer	Summer	2011	Free	
36	DF	(Italy)	Savini	30	EU	Palermo (Italy)	Transfer	Summer	2011	Free	
20	MF	(Portugal)	Vieirinha	40	EU	Porto (Portugal)	Transfer	Summer	2013	€0.37M	
6	MF	(Spain)	Vitolo	25	EU	Racing Santander (Spain)	Transfer	Summer	2013	Free	
3	DF	(South Africa)	Moon	23	Non-EU	Panathinaikos	Loan	Summer	2010	€0.2M	
80	MF	(Brazil)	Cristiano	26	Non-EU	Paços de Ferreira (Portugal)	Transfer	Winter	2012	€0.15M	
80	FW	(Portugal)	Edinho	27	EU	Málaga (Spain)	Loan	Winter	2010	Free	

Total spending: ▼€2 million

==== Out ====
No.	Pos.	Nat.	Name	Age	EU	Moving to	Type	Transfer window	Transfer fee	Source
4	DF	(Brazil)	Marcos António	25–26	Non-EU	Auxerre (France)	End of loan	Summer	Free	
6	DF	(Greece)	Darlas	25–26	EU	Panathinaikos	End of loan	Summer	Free	
18	MF	(Greece)	Vangelis	25–26	EU	PAS Giannina	End of contract	Summer	Free	
10	FW	(Ivory Coast)	Bakayoko	32–33	Non-EU	PAS Giannina	End of contract	Summer	Free	
3	MF	(Greece)	Konstantinidis	33–34	EU	OFI	End of contract	Summer	Free	
8	MF	(Greece)	Iliadis	22–23	EU	Iraklis	End of contract	Summer	Free	
23	MF	(Greece)	Lakis	32–33	EU	Kavala	End of contract	Summer	Free	
50	GK	(Greece)	Rizos	32–33	EU		End of contract	Summer	Free	
79	FW	(Greece)	Choutos	29–30	EU	Pescina V.d.G. (Italy)	End of contract	Summer	Free	
28	FW	(Greece)	Athanasiadis	20–21	EU	Panserraikos	Loan	Summer		
25	MF	(Greece)	Balafas	22–23	EU	PAS Giannina	Loan	Summer		
77	DF	(Greece)	Karapiperis	20–21	EU	Panserraikos	Loan	Summer		
71	GK	(Greece)	Glikos	22–23	EU	Olympiacos Volos	Loan	Summer		
9	FW	(Greece)	Anastasakos	30–31	EU	Atromitos	Transfer	Summer	€0.08M	

Total income: ▲€80,000

== Pre-season ==
Game	Date	Tournament	Round	Ground	Opponent	Score^{1}	Report
1	14 July	Friendly	–	N	NEC (Netherlands)	1–1	Kick off / 20:00; NEC / PAOK; Vleminckx 57'; Goossens (yellow card) 70' / Cirillo (yellow card) 27'; Fotakis (yellow card) 50'; Bizera (yellow card) 56'; Fotakis 63'
2	16 July	Friendly	–	N	Guadalajara (Mexico)	0–1	Kick off / 20:00; PAOK / Guadalajara; / Ponce 65'
3	20 July	Friendly	–	A (Netherlands)	Willem II (Netherlands)	2–0	Kick off / 20:00; Willem II / PAOK; / Muslimović 33'; Anastasakos 92'
4	22 July	Friendly	–	A (Netherlands)	Sparta Rotterdam (Netherlands)	1–0	Kick off / 20:30; Sparta Rotterdam / PAOK; / Cirillo 37'
5	12 August	Friendly	–	H	Ergotelis	1–0	PAOK / Ergotelis; Sorlin 92'
6	5 September	Friendly	–	A	Panserraikos	1–0	Attendance / 6000; Referee / Haralampidis; Panserraikos / PAOK; / Vieirinha 21'

Last updated: 7 September 2009
^{1}PAOK goals come first.
National flags for Ground and Opponent columns are only shown when different from that of PAOK.
M = Match; Ground: H = Home, A = Away, N = Neutral, HR = Home replacement, AR = Away replacement.

== Competitions ==
=== Overview ===
Competition	Record							
Competition	Pld	W	D	L	GF	GA	GD	Win %
Super League Greece	30	19	5	6	41	16	+25	63.33
Greek Cup	3	2	0	1	3	4	−1	66.67
UEFA play-offs	6	4	1	1	7	3	+4	66.67
UEFA Europa League	4	1	2	1	3	3	+0	25.00
Total	43	26	8	9	54	26	+28	60.47

Last updated: 19 May 2010.
Source: Competitions

== Super League Greece ==
=== League table ===
Pos	Team	Pld	W	D	L	GF	GA	GD	Pts	Qualification or relegation
1	Panathinaikos (C)	30	22	4	4	54	17	+37	70	Qualification for the Champions League group stage
2	Olympiacos	30	19	7	4	47	18	+29	64	Qualification for the Play-offs
3	PAOK	30	19	5	6	41	16	+25	62	Qualification for the Play-offs
4	AEK Athens	30	15	8	7	43	31	+12	53	Qualification for the Play-offs
5	Aris	30	12	10	8	35	28	+7	46	Qualification for the Play-offs

Source: Super League Greece
Rules for classification: 1) Points; 2) Head-to-head points; 3) Head-to-head goal difference; 4) Play-offs (neutral ground).
(Note: Criterion 4 is only used if needed to decide champion, teams for relegation or teams for UEFA competitions).
(C) Champions

=== Results summary ===
Overall								Home						Away					
Pld	W	D	L	GF	GA	GD	Pts	W	D	L	GF	GA	GD	W	D	L	GF	GA	GD
30	19	5	6	41	16	+25	62	13	0	2	26	6	+20	6	5	4	15	10	+5

Last updated: 18 April.
Source: Competitive matches

=== Results by round ===
Round	1	2	3	4	5	6	7	8	9	10	11	12	13	14	15	16	17	18	19	20	21	22	23	24	25	26	27	28	29	30
Ground	H	A	H	A	A	H	H	A	H	A	H	A	H	A	A	H	A	H	A	H	A	A	H	A	H	A	H	A	H	H
Result	W	D	L	D	D	W	W	L	W	W	W	L	W	D	W	W	W	W	W	W	D	W	W	W	W	L	L	L	W	W
Position	8	6	5	10	9	7	3	4	3	3	3	3	3	3	3	3	3	3	2	2	3	3	2	2	2	2	3	3	3	3

Source: Competitive matches
A = Away; H = Home; W = Win; D = Draw; L = Loss

=== Matches ===
Win Draw Loss

30 August 2009 2	PAOK	3–0	Levadiakos	Thessaloniki
16:45 EET	Abubakari (yellow card) 60'; Vieirinha 61'; Filomeno 65' (yellow card) 66'; Koutsianikoulis 73'; Malezas (yellow card) 81'	Report	(yellow card) 24' Koltzos	Stadium: Toumba Stadium; Attendance: 11,934; Referee: Georgios Giannopoulos

13 September 2009 3	Asteras Tripolis	1–1	PAOK	Tripoli
16:45 EET	Cesarec 62'; Cardozo (yellow card) 66'	Report	(yellow card) 21' Arabatzis; 48' (yellow card) 76' Fotakis	Stadium: Theodoros Kolokotronis Stadium; Attendance: 2,500; Referee: Giorgos Stathopoulos

20 September 2009 4	PAOK	1–2	Olympiacos	Thessaloniki
16:00 EET	Vieirinha 11'; Fotakis (yellow card) 29'; Filomeno (yellow card) 55'	Report	41' Diogo; (yellow card) 60' Leonardo; 90' Papadopoulos	Stadium: Toumba Stadium; Attendance: 23,010; Referee: Anastasios Kakos

23 September 2009 1	Panionios	0–0	PAOK	Nea Smyrni, Athens
19:00 EET	Tzavellas (yellow card) 90'	Report	(yellow card) 67' Cirillo; (red card) 74' Papazoglou; (yellow card) 90' García	Stadium: Nea Smyrni Stadium; Attendance: 2,003; Referee: Dimitris Kyrkos

27 September 2009 5	Atromitos	0–0	PAOK	Peristeri, Athens
19:00 EET	Nebegleras (yellow card) 24'; Skondras (yellow card) 27'; Anastasakos (yellow card) 83'	Report	(yellow card) 23' Malezas; (yellow card) 48' Arabatzis; (yellow card) 86' Contreras	Stadium: Peristeri Stadium; Attendance: 4,020; Referee: Marios Labropoulos

5 October 2009 6	PAOK	1–0	Iraklis	Thessaloniki
20:30 EET	Cirillo (yellow card) 30'; Malezas (yellow card) 39'; Conceição (yellow card) 57'; García (yellow card) 83'; Ivić 87'	Report	(yellow card) 25' Lequi; (yellow card) 39' Iacob; (yellow card) 81' Giannoulis	Stadium: Toumba Stadium; Attendance: 13,944; Referee: Vasilios Pamporidis

17 October 2009 7	PAOK	2–0	PAS Giannina	Thessaloniki
19:00 EET	Conceição (yellow card) 25'; Ivić (yellow card) 39'; Lino 43'; Arabatzis 45'; Sorlin (yellow card) 90'	Report	(yellow card) 27' Kanakoudis; (yellow card) 42' Scardovelli; (yellow card) 71' Dasios	Stadium: Toumba Stadium; Attendance: 13,239; Referee: Michalis Tsiniaris

25 October 2009 8	Panathinaikos	2–1	PAOK	Athens
19:00 EET	Katsouranis 23', 70'; Sarriegi (yellow card) 41'	Report	(yellow card) 37' (yellow-red card) 83' Ivić; 39' Vieirinha; (yellow card) 44' García; (yellow card) 51' Contreras; (yellow card) 52' Sorlin	Stadium: Olympic Stadium; Attendance: 19,875; Referee: Ilias Spathas

31 October 2009 9	PAOK	1–0	Xanthi	Thessaloniki
16:45 EET	Ivić 90'; Lino (yellow card) 90'	Report	(yellow card) 72' Papadimitriou; (yellow card) 83' Štrba; (yellow card) 89' Jaggy	Stadium: Toumba Stadium; Attendance: 11,044; Referee: Giorgos Daloukas

7 November 2009 10	Panthrakikos	1–2	PAOK	Komotini
19:00 EET	Đokić (yellow card) 32'; Marcelo (yellow card) 32'; Clément (yellow card) 32'; N'Gambi (yellow card) 36'; Buval 69'; Kazakis (yellow card) 90'	Report	26' (yellow card) 32' Vieirinha; (yellow card) 33' Krešić; (yellow card) 41' Vitolo; 56' García; (yellow card) 90' Lino	Stadium: Komotini Municipal Stadium; Attendance: 3.738; Referee: Nikos Charalampidis

22 November 2009 11	PAOK	4–1	Aris	Thessaloniki
19:00 EET	Ivić 20' (pen.) (yellow card) 21'; Muslimović (yellow card) 29' (goal) 45', 60'; García (yellow card) 33'; Cirillo (yellow card) 45'; Vitolo 47' (pen.) (yellow card) 83'; Fotakis (yellow card) 86'	Report	(yellow card) 12' Roberge; (yellow card) 12' (goal) 85' Neto; (yellow card) 19' Nasuti; (yellow card) 45' Arano; (yellow card) 45' Nafti; (yellow card) 83' Labriakos	Stadium: Toumba Stadium; Attendance: 23,034; Referee: Dimitris Kalopoulos

28 November 2009 12	AEK Athens	1–0	PAOK	Athens
19:00 EET	Makos (yellow card) 30'; Manduca 48'; Hersi (yellow card) 76'	Report	(yellow card) 40' Ivić; (yellow card) 45' Vitolo; (yellow card) 59' Arabatzis; (yellow card) 87' Contreras	Stadium: Olympic Stadium; Attendance: 15,942; Referee: Giorgos Stathopoulos

5 December 2009 13	PAOK	1–0	AEL	Thessaloniki
19:00 EET	Ivić 4' (pen.); Contreras (yellow card) 25'; Cirillo (yellow card) 53'; Muslimović (yellow card) 62' (yellow-red card) 90'	Report	(yellow card) 3' Malarz; (yellow card) 53' Iglesias; (red card) 54' Casas; (yellow card) 88' Dabizas	Stadium: Toumba Stadium; Attendance: 16,539; Referee: Konstantinos Papastamatis

13 December 2009 14	Kavala	0–0	PAOK	Kavala
16:45 EET	Pavićević (yellow card) 2'; Mendy (yellow card) 8'; Douglão (yellow card) 36'; Ikonomou (yellow card) 58'; Psomas (yellow card) 61'; Dobrašinović (yellow card) 82'	Report	(yellow card) 43' Sorlin; (yellow card) 59' Lino	Stadium: Anthi Karagianni Stadium; Attendance: 7,142; Referee: Dimitris Gagas

19 December 2009 15	Ergotelis	0–2	PAOK	Heraklion
16:45 EET	Orfanos (yellow card) 25'; Roubakis (yellow card) 36'; Česnauskis (yellow card) 44'; Leal (yellow card) 83'	Report	53' Arabatzis; 65' (yellow card) 65' Vieirinha; (yellow card) 78' Contreras	Stadium: Pankritio Stadium; Attendance: 2,189; Referee: Stavros Tritsonis

6 January 2010 16	PAOK	1–0	Panionios	Thessaloniki
19:00 EET	Ivić 31'; Koutsianikoulis (yellow card) 36'; Vieirinha (yellow card) 75'; Contreras (yellow card) 90'	Report	(yellow card) 10' Latka; (yellow card) 30' Kumordzi; (yellow card) 64' Nicolaou; (yellow card) 73' Balaban	Stadium: Toumba Stadium; Attendance: 16,129; Referee: Giorgos Daloukas

9 January 2010 17	Levadiakos	0–2	PAOK	Livadeia
19:00 EET	Martorell (yellow card) 36'; Moulopoulos (yellow card) 55'	Report	10' (yellow card) 52' Ivić; (yellow card) 28' (yellow-red card) 59' Arabatzis; 82' Lino	Stadium: Levadia Municipal Stadium; Attendance: 3,209; Referee: Andreas Pappas

16 January 2010 18	PAOK	1–0	Asteras Tripolis	Thessaloniki
16:45 EET	Ivić (yellow card) 16'; Vieirinha (red card) 20'; Koutsianikoulis 53'; Sznaucner (yellow card) 90'	Report	(yellow card) 16' Lazaridis; (yellow card) 21' Bastía; (yellow card) 35' Urribarri	Stadium: Toumba Stadium; Attendance: 14,128; Referee: Michalis Dakos

24 January 2010 19	Olympiacos	0–1	PAOK	Piraeus
19:00 EET	Galitsios (yellow card) 18'; Maresca (yellow card) 74'; Diogo (yellow card) 90'	Report	(yellow card) 11' Vitolo; (yellow card) 16' Contreras; 20' Edinho; (yellow card) 71' Chalkias; (yellow card) 76' García	Stadium: Karaiskakis Stadium; Attendance: 26,139; Referee: Giorgos Daloukas

30 January 2010 20	PAOK	1–0	Atromitos	Thessaloniki
19:00 EET	Cristiano (yellow card) 34'; Papazoglou 87'	Report	(yellow card) 15' Melissas; (yellow card) 19' Sarmiento; (yellow card) 40' Kalantzis; (yellow card) 45' Oliveira	Stadium: Toumba Stadium; Attendance: 17,119; Referee: Evaggelos Giannopoulos

7 February 2010 21	Iraklis	1–1	PAOK	Thessaloniki
15:00 EET	Rimoldi (yellow card) 24'; Mara (yellow card) 30'; Martos (yellow card) 43'; Giantsis 55'; S. Garcia (yellow card) 70'; Giannoulis (yellow card) 70'	Report	(yellow card) 18' Arabatzis; (yellow card) 28' (goal) 35' Muslimović; (yellow card) 29' (yellow-red card) 45' Vitolo; (yellow card) 90' Vieirinha	Stadium: Kaftanzoglio Stadium; Attendance: 4,571; Referee: Ilias Spathas

13 February 2010 22	PAS Giannina	0–1	PAOK	Ioannina
19:00 EET	Kousas (yellow card) 29'; Šišić (yellow card) 45'; Dasios (yellow card) 48'; Kaznaferis (yellow card) 80'; Scardovelli (yellow card) 82'	Report	(yellow card) 41' (goal) 43' Fotakis; (yellow card) 49' Vieirinha; (yellow card) 59' (yellow-red card) 63' Arabatzis; (yellow card) 49' Moon	Stadium: Zosimades Stadium; Attendance: 4191; Referee: Stavros Tritsonis

21 February 2010 23	PAOK	2–1	Panathinaikos	Thessaloniki
19:00 EET	Contreras (yellow card) 24'; García (yellow card) 41' (goal) 59'; Muslimović 68' (yellow card) 69'	Report	(yellow card) 31' Vyntra; (yellow card) 41' Leto; (yellow card) 47' Sarriegi; 64' Cissé	Stadium: Toumba Stadium; Attendance: 23104; Referee: Giorgos Daloukas

27 February 2010 24	Xanthi	0–3	PAOK	Xanthi
19:00 EET	Luciano de Souza (yellow card) 73'; Marcelinho (yellow card) 84'	Report	7', 66' Vieirinha; 13' Ivić	Stadium: Xanthi FC Arena; Attendance: 1457; Referee: Stavros Tritsonis

6 March 2010 25	PAOK	3–0	Panthrakikos	Thessaloniki
16:45 EET	Malezas 24'; Sorlin 41'; Lino 78'	Report		Stadium: Toumba Stadium; Attendance: 20,013; Referee: Marios Labropoulos

14 March 2010 26	Aris	2–0	PAOK	Thessaloniki
19:00 EET	Koke (yellow card) 15'; Cámpora (penalty missed) 20' 22', 65' (yellow card) 27'; Meriem (yellow card) 48'	Report	(yellow card) 2' García; (yellow card) 19' Contreras; (yellow card) 25' Ivić; (yellow card) 41' (yellow-red card) 80' Vieirinha; (yellow card) 63' (yellow-red card) 78' Sznaucner; (yellow card) 80' Chalkias	Stadium: Kleanthis Vikelidis Stadium; Attendance: 17,353; Referee: Ilias Spathas

21 March 2010 27	PAOK	0–1	AEK Athens	Thessaloniki
19:00 EET	Arabatzis (yellow card) 44'; Koutsianikoulis (yellow card) 45'	Report	15' (yellow card) 36' Blanco; (yellow card) 20' Jahić; (yellow card) 73' Saja; (yellow card) 83' Scocco	Stadium: Toumba Stadium; Attendance: 18589; Referee: Anastasios Kakos

28 March 2010 28	AEL	2–1	PAOK	Larissa
19:00 EET	Katsiaros (yellow card) 13' (yellow-red card) 90'; Cousin 16' (yellow card) 51'; Dabizas (yellow card) 39'; Puri 90'	Report	(yellow card) 25' Cirillo; (yellow card) 48' Fotakis; 82' (yellow card) 87' Contreras; (yellow card) 84' Ivić	Stadium: Alcazar Stadium; Attendance: 6848; Referee: Giorgos Stathopoulos

11 April 2010 29	PAOK	1–0	Kavala	Thessaloniki
19:00 EET	Muslimović 45'; Fotakis (yellow card) 82'; Malezas (yellow card) 90'	Report	(yellow card) 26' Oruma; (yellow card) 73' Rincón; (yellow card) 76' Theodorelis; (yellow card) 90' Pavićević	Stadium: Toumba Stadium; Attendance: 11,117; Referee: Michalis Dakos

18 April 2010 30	PAOK	4–1	Ergotelis	Thessaloniki
19:00 EET	Sorlin 2'; Muslimović 10'; Cirillo 16'; Papazoglou 27'	Report	46' Chrysofakis; (yellow card) 47' Orfanos; (yellow card) 84' Bertoša	Stadium: Toumba Stadium; Attendance: 9,014; Referee: Konstantinos Papastamatis

=== Play-offs ===
Pos	Team	Pld	W	D	L	GF	GA	GD	Pts	Qualification
2	PAOK	6	4	1	1	7	3	+4	16	Qualification for the Champions League third qualifying round
3	AEK Athens	6	2	2	2	8	7	+1	9	Qualification for the Europa League play-off round (Note: Since Aris lost the 2009–10 Greek Football Cup Final against Champions League-qualified Panathinaikos, all Europa League spots will be determined by the play-off group positions.)
4	Aris	6	2	2	2	8	9	−1	8 (Note: Head-to-head record: Aris–Olympiacos 2–0, Olympiacos–Aris 0–0.)	Qualification for the Europa League third qualifying round
5	Olympiacos	6	1	1	4	3	7	−4	8	Qualification for the Europa League second qualifying round

Source: Super League Greece: Standings and Schedule
Rules for classification: 1) points; 2) head-to-head points; 3) head-to-head goal difference; 4) head-to-head goals scored; 5) goal difference; 6) number of goals scored.

==== Matches ====
Win Draw Loss

28 April 2010 1	AEK Athens	0–0	PAOK	Athens
16:45 EET	Araujo (yellow card) 71'	Report	(yellow card) 35' Vitolo	Stadium: Olympic Stadium; Attendance: 11,807; Referee: Michalis Dakos

2 May 2010 2	PAOK	2–0	Aris	Thessaloniki
21:15 EET	Ivić (yellow card) 5' (goal) 26'; Savini (yellow card) 14' (goal) 36'; García (yellow card) 37'; Contreras (yellow card) 62'; Filomeno (yellow card) 84'; Chalkias (yellow card) 86'	Report	(yellow card) 5' Neto; (yellow card) 64' Nasuti; (yellow card) 70' Prittas; (yellow card) 86' Labriakos	Stadium: Toumba Stadium; Attendance: 23,412; Referee: Giorgos Stathopoulos

9 May 2010 3	PAOK	1–0	Olympiacos	Thessaloniki
19:00 EET	Muslimović 11'; Sorlin (yellow card) 38'; Lino (yellow card) 80'	Report	(yellow card) 74' Żewłakow; (yellow card) 82' Torosidis	Stadium: Toumba Stadium; Attendance: 24,109; Referee: Anastasios Kakos

12 May 2010 4	Olympiacos	0–1	PAOK	Piraeus
16:45 EET	Maresca (yellow card) 29'; Papadopoulos (yellow card) 45'; Torosidis (yellow card) 59'; Dudu (yellow card) 81'; Bravo (yellow card) 85'; Mellberg (red card) 89'	Report	(yellow card) 23' Vitolo; 33' Ivić; (yellow card) 45' Filomeno; (yellow card) 58' García; (yellow card) 89' (yellow-red card) 90' Contreras	Stadium: Karaiskakis Stadium; Attendance: 15,829; Referee: Giorgos Daloukas

16 May 2010 5	PAOK	1–0	AEK Athens	Thessaloniki
21:15 EET	Cirillo (yellow card) 31'; Fotakis (yellow card) 32' (yellow-red card) 90'; Muslimović 52' (yellow card) 53'	Report	(yellow card) 18' Georgeas; (yellow card) 20' Lagos; (yellow card) 22' Németh; (penalty missed) 49' Scocco; (yellow card) 87' Majstorović	Stadium: Toumba Stadium; Attendance: 25,303; Referee: Michalis Koukoulakis

19 May 2010 6	Aris	3–2	PAOK	Thessaloniki
20:30 EET	Malezas 12' (o.g.); Javito 32'; Fernández (yellow card) 39'; Cámpora 62'	Report	22' Papazoglou; (yellow card) 23' Vieirinha; (yellow card) 43' Edinho; 45' (pen.) Cirillo; (yellow card) 54' Sorlin; (yellow card) 86' Arabatzis	Stadium: Kleanthis Vikelidis Stadium; Attendance: 6,962; Referee: Giorgos Stathopoulos

== Greek Cup ==
=== Fourth round ===
28 October 2009	OFI	0–1	PAOK	Heraklion
14:00		Report	40' Papazoglou	Stadium: Theodoros Vardinogiannis Stadium; Attendance: 7,500; Referee: Konstantinos Papastamatis

=== Fifth round ===
20 January 2010	Panserraikos	0–2	PAOK	Serres
17:00	Galanopoulos (yellow card) 13'; Castro (yellow card) 22'; Rimoldi (yellow card) 66'; Hoyos (yellow card) 86'	Report	14' Lino; (yellow card) 26' Sorlin; 74' Papazoglou	Stadium: Serres Municipal Stadium; Referee: Georgios Stathopoulos

=== Quarter-finals ===
2 February 2010	PAS Giannina	4–0	PAOK	Ioannina
17:00	Dimbala 8', 80'; Kousas 24' (yellow card) 24'; Bakayoko (yellow card) 29'; Sznaucner 43' (o.g.); Sikalias (yellow card) 75'; Dasios (yellow card) 79'	Report	(yellow card) 1' Vitolo; (yellow card) 23' García; (yellow card) 79' Savini	Stadium: Zosimades Stadium; Attendance: 4,000; Referee: Vasilios Pamporidis

One Match, or a replay match on a draw

== UEFA Europa League ==
=== Third qualifying round ===
30 July 2009 1st leg	Vålerenga (Norway)	1–2	(Greece) PAOK	Oslo, Norway
19:00 CEST (UTC+02:00)	Storbæk 42'; Zajić (yellow card) 44'	Report	31' Lino; 37' Muslimović; (yellow card) 77' Cirillo	Stadium: Ullevaal Stadion; Attendance: 3,470; Referee: (Romania) Alexandru Deaconu

6 August 2009 2nd leg	PAOK (Greece)	0–1 (2a–2 agg.)	(Norway) Vålerenga	Thessaloniki, Greece
20:45 CEST (UTC+02:00)	Fotakis (yellow card) 87'; Papazoglou (yellow card) 90+2'	Report	(yellow card) 29' Hagen; 60' Berre	Stadium: Toumba Stadium; Attendance: 26,500; Referee: (Italy) Luca Banti

=== Play-off Round ===
20 August 2009 1st leg	PAOK (Greece)	1–1	(Netherlands) Heerenven	Thessaloniki, Greece
19:00 CEST (UTC+02:00)	Vieirinha (yellow card) 52'; Ivić 55'; Malezas (yellow card) 61'; Vitolo (yellow card) 62'	Report	45+3' (yellow card) 50' Paulo Henrique; (yellow card) 56' Koning	Stadium: Toumba Stadium; Attendance: 26,500; Referee: (Scotland) Willie Collum

27 August 2009 2nd leg	Heerenveen (Netherlands)	0–0 (1a–1 agg.)	(Greece) PAOK	Heerenveen, Netherlands
18:45 CEST (UTC+02:00)	Breuer (yellow card) 25'; Dingsdag (yellow card) 56'; Losada (yellow card) 61'; Đurić (yellow card) 89'; Bak (yellow card) 90+5'	Report	(yellow card) 69' Vitolo; (yellow card) 86' Bizera; (yellow card) 90+5' Cirillo	Stadium: Abe Lenstra Stadion; Attendance: 14,000; Referee: (Spain) Eduardo Iturralde González

== Squad stats ==
=== Squad statistics ===
As of Full Season-All matches

Appearances denote players in the starting lineup, with the numbers in parentheses denoting appearances as substitute.

No.	Name	Super League		Greek Cup		Play-offs		Europa League		Total	
No.	Name	Apps	Goals	Apps	Goals	Apps	Goals	Apps	Goals	Apps	Goals
Goalkeepers
1	(Greece) Kostas Chalkias	28	0	2	0	4	0	4	0	38	0
91	(Croatia) Dario Krešić	4 (2)	0	1	0	2	0	0	0	7 (2)	0
Defenders
2	(Greece) Nikos Arabatzis	20 (1)	2	2	0	1	0	0	0	23 (1)	2
3	(South Africa) Bryce Moon	6 (5)	0	1	0	0	0	0	0	7 (5)	0
8	(Italy) Bruno Cirillo	19 (2)	1	0	0	6	1	4	0	29 (2)	2
13	(Greece) Stelios Malezas	21	1	3 (1)	0	5 (2)	0	2 (1)	0	31 (4)	1
15	(Chile) Pablo Contreras	19 (4)	1	3	0	4	0	0	0	26 (4)	1
16	(Brazil) Lino	28	3	3	1	5	0	4	1	40	5
27	(Poland) Mirosław Sznaucner	12 (1)	0	1	0	2	0	2	0	17 (1)	0
36	(Italy) Mirko Savini	11 (3)	0	2 (1)	0	3	1	2	0	18 (4)	1
23	(Uruguay) Joe Bizera	1	0	0	0	0	0	3	0	4	0
Midfielders
	(Serbia) Kristijan Miljević	0	0	0	0	1 (1)	0	0	0	1 (1)	0
	(Greece) Grigoris Efthimiadis	0	0	0	0	1 (1)	0	0	0	1 (1)	0
5	(Uruguay) Pablo García	25 (1)	2	3 (2)	0	5	0	4	0	37 (3)	2
6	(Spain) Vitolo	21	1	3	0	5	0	2	0	31	1
7	(Portugal) Sérgio Conceição	6 (2)	0	0	0	0	0	3	0	9 (2)	0
10	(France) Olivier Sorlin	24 (2)	2	2	0	5	0	2	0	33 (2)	2
18	(Greece) Georgios Fotakis	21 (7)	2	3 (1)	0	4 (3)	0	3	0	31 (11)	2
19	(Greece) Koutsianikoulis	26 (18)	2	3 (1)	0	3 (2)	0	3 (3)	0	35 (24)	2
20	(Portugal) Vieirinha	28	7	2	0	6	0	2	0	38	7
21	(Serbia) Vladimir Ivić	26 (3)	7	0	0	4	2	4	1	34 (3)	10
22	(Argentina) Ricardo Verón	1 (1)	0	1	0	0	0	0	0	2 (1)	0
28	(Ghana) Mohammed Abubakari	1	0	0	0	0	0	0	0	1	0
80	(Brazil) Cristiano	8 (4)	0	1	0	0	0	0	0	9 (4)	0
Forwards
	(Greece) Ilias Anastasakos	0	0	0	0	0	0	4 (3)	0	4 (3)	0
9	(Portugal) Edinho	10 (5)	1	2 (1)	0	4 (3)	0	0	0	16 (9)	1
11	(Bosnia and Herzegovina) Zlatan Muslimović	19 (4)	6	1 (1)	0	5 (1)	2	3	1	28 (6)	9
14	(Greece) Thanasis Papazoglou	19 (11)	2	3 (1)	2	3 (2)	1	1 (1)	0	26 (15)	5
31	(Argentina) Lucio Filomeno	9 (7)	1	0	0	5 (2)	0	4 (4)	0	18 (13)	1

Last updated: 19 May 2010
Source: Match reports in competitive matches, superleaguegreece.net, uefa.com, paokfc.gr soccerway.com
Ordered by squad number
0 shown as blank

=== Goalscorers ===
Rank	No.	Pos.	Player	Super League	Greek Cup	Play-offs	Europa League	Total
1	21	MF	(Serbia) Vladimir Ivić	7	0	2	1	10
2	11	FW	(Bosnia and Herzegovina) Zlatan Muslimović	6	0	2	1	9
3	20	MF	(Portugal) Vieirinha	7	0	0	0	7
4	14	FW	(Greece) Thanasis Papazoglou	2	2	1	0	5
5	16	DF	(Brazil) Lino	3	1	0	1	5
6	5	MF	(Uruguay) Pablo García	2	0	0	0	2
7	10	MF	(France) Olivier Sorlin	2	0	0	0	2
8	18	MF	(Greece) Georgios Fotakis	2	0	0	0	2
9	19	MF	(Greece) Koutsianikoulis	2	0	0	0	2
10	2	DF	(Greece) Nikos Arabatzis	2	0	0	0	2
11	8	DF	(Italy) Bruno Cirillo	1	0	1	0	2
12	9	FW	(Portugal) Edinho	1	0	0	0	1
13	31	FW	(Argentina) Lucio Filomeno	1	0	0	0	1
14	6	MF	(Spain) Vitolo	1	0	0	0	1
15	15	DF	(Chile) Pablo Contreras	1	0	0	0	1
16	13	DF	(Greece) Stelios Malezas	1	0	0	0	1
17	36	DF	(Italy) Mirko Savini	0	0	1	0	1
Own goals				0	0	0	0	0
TOTALS				41	3	7	3	54

Last updated: All matches
Source: Match reports in Competitive matches
0 shown as blank

=== Disciplinary record ===
No.	Pos	Nat	Name	Super League			Greek Cup			Play-off			Europa League			Total			Notes
No.	Pos	Nat	Name	Yellow card	(yellow card) (yellow-red card)	Red card	Yellow card	(yellow card) (yellow-red card)	Red card	Yellow card	(yellow card) (yellow-red card)	Red card	Yellow card	(yellow card) (yellow-red card)	Red card	Yellow card	(yellow card) (yellow-red card)	Red card	Notes
15	DF	(Chile)	Pablo Contreras	10						1	1					11	1		
6	MF	(Spain)	Vitolo	4	1		1			2			2			9	1		
5	MF	(Uruguay)	Pablo Garcia	7			1			2						10			
20	MF	(Portugal)	Vieirinha	5	1	1				1			1			7	1	1	
2	DF	(Greece)	Nikos Arabatzis	5	2								1			6	2		
21	MF	(Serbia)	Vladimir Ivić	6	1					1						7	1		
8	DF	(Italy)	Bruno Cirillo	5						1			2			8			
18	MF	(Greece)	Georgios Fotakis	5							1		1			6	1		
10	MF	(France)	Olivier Sorlin	3			1			2						6			
11	FW	(Bosnia and Herzegovina)	Zlatan Muslimović	3	1					1						4	1		
13	DF	(Greece)	Stelios Malezas	4									1			5			
16	DF	(Brazil)	Lino	3						1						4			
31	FW	(Argentina)	Lucio Filomeno	2						2						4			
1	GK	(Greece)	Kostas Chalkias	2						1						3			
27	DF	(Poland)	Mirosław Sznaucner	1	1											1	1		
14	FW	(Greece)	Thanasis Papazoglou			1							1			1		1	
19	MF	(Greece)	Koutsianikoulis	2												2			
7	MF	(Portugal)	Sérgio Conceição	2												2			
36	DF	(Italy)	Mirko Savini				1			1						2			
28	MF	(Ghana)	Mohammed Abubakari	1												1			
3	DF	(South Africa)	Bryce Moon	1												1			
91	GK	(Croatia)	Dario Krešić	1												1			
	MF	(Brazil)	Cristiano	1												1			
80	DF	(Uruguay)	Joe Bizera										1			1			
9	FW	(Portugal)	Edinho							1						1			
			TOTAL	73	7	2	4	0	0	18	2	0	9	0	0	104	9	2	

Only competitive matches

Ordered by (red card) , (yellow card) (yellow-red card) and (yellow card)
(yellow card) = Number of bookings; (yellow card) (yellow-red card) = Number of sending offs after a second yellow card; (red card) = Number of sending offs by a direct red card.
0 shown as blank

Source: Match reports in competitive matches, competitive matches, superleaguegreece.net, uefa.com, paokfc.gr soccerway.com

=== Start formations ===
Qnt	Formation	Match(es)
21	4–2–3–1	1–3, 6, 15–17, 19–32
8	4–3–3	7–12, 14, 18
3	4–4–2	4–5, 13

Last updated: 6 March
Only competitive matches.
