= Zisis Vryzas =

Greek footballer (born 1973)

Personal information
- Date of birth: 9 November 1973 (age 52)
- Place of birth: Kavala, Greece
- Height: 1.90 m (6 ft 3 in)
- Position: Forward

Senior career*
Years	Team	Apps	(Gls)
1991–1996	Skoda Xanthi	122	(31)
1996–2000	PAOK	118	(19)
2000–2003	Perugia	108	(25)
2003–2005	Fiorentina	20	(4)
2004–2005	→ Celta Vigo (loan)	32	(7)
2005–2006	Torino	11	(2)
2006–2007	Skoda Xanthi	16	(1)
2007–2008	PAOK	13	(0)
Total		440	(89)

International career
1994–2006	Greece	68	(9)
Medal record
Men's football
Representing Greece
UEFA European Championship
Winner	2004
World Military Cup
Winner	1997
- * Club domestic league appearances and goals

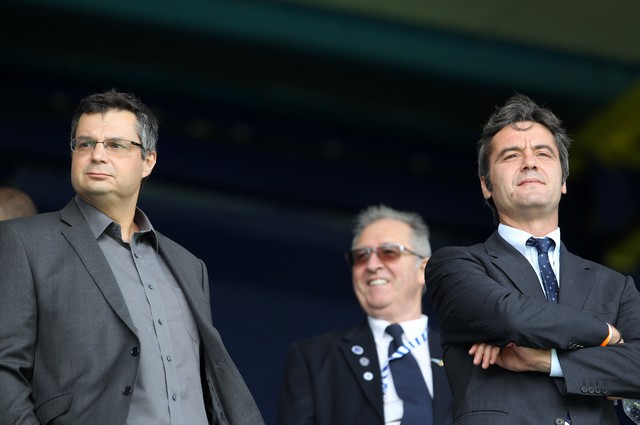
Zisis Vryzas (R)

Zisis Vryzas (Greek: Ζήσης Βρύζας; born 9 November 1973) is a Greek former professional footballer who played as a forward for various teams in Greece and abroad, as well as for Greece, when they won the Euro 2004. After his retirement, he worked for PAOK as technical director, and for a brief period, took up the position of president, following Theodoros Zagorakis' resignation. On 16 August 2010, Vryzas became the assistant coach of the Greece national team.

== Club career ==
=== Skoda Xanthi ===
Born in Kavala, Vryzas started his football career at Skoda Xanthi where his talent attracted the interest of stronger domestic as well as foreign Clubs.

=== PAOK ===
In 1996, Vryzas was signed by PAOK, where he enjoyed great popularity among PAOK fans for his power, determination and devotion with which they describe his game and for scoring a handful of very important goals. The most significant memory of his career at PAOK occurred in the first round second leg of the 1997–98 UEFA Cup. It was the equaliser (1–1 on the night, 2–1 on aggregate) he scored in the 87th minute against Arsenal at Highbury, which resulted in a notable, historic qualification for PAOK against the English team who managed to win the double in the Premier League that same season.

=== Perugia ===
In 2000, while PAOK were struggling with endless financial problems due to the ineffective policy of debts and mismanagement of the main share-holder, consequently Vryzas was sold to the Italian Serie A relegation battlers Perugia. In Perugia, he once again gained popularity among the local fans for his work-rate and immediate adjustment to the new environment, which proved to be a key-factor for Perugia's constant presence in the Serie A, under the management of Serse Cosmi.

=== Fiorentina ===
His very positive performances with Perugia earned him a more lucrative contract at the once mighty Fiorentina in 2003. At that time he was struggling in Serie B. Ironically, the Viola returned to Serie A at the expense of Perugia through a two-legged play-off as they had finished sixth in Serie B that season, while Perugia had finished at 15th place in Serie A.

==== Loan to Celta Vigo ====
In 2004, the Greek striker joined Celta Vigo in a loan deal from Fiorentina with an option for the deal to become permanent.

=== Torino ===
In January 2006 the Greek striker eventually departed again to join another popular Club of northern Italy, Torino until the end of his contract.

=== Return to Skoda Xanthi ===
In the summer of 2006, Vryzas returned to Greece and in particular to the club where he started his professional career, Skoda Xanthi.

=== Return to PAOK ===
In June 2007, he finally decided to join the "club of his heart" and signed a two-year contract with PAOK. There he found his old companion and team-mate, at both PAOK and Greece during the 1990's, Theodoros Zagorakis, who had only just taken the presidency of the club. Vryzas stated upon his return that PAOK was an emotional choice for him, and the last stop in his career should only be in the club he loved and supported since childhood. On 6 January 2008, Vryzas played his last game of his football career at the home game against AEL, where PAOK won with 1–0, with a goal by Lazaros Christodoulopoulos, who dedicated his goal to Vryzas. Vryzas, actually came in as a substitution at the 82nd minute to replace Christodoulopoulos and was honoured by the fans with a standing ovation and with a long singing of his name, which lasted until the end of the match, as he thanked them during his "goodbye round" of the stadium.

== International career ==
Vryzas debuted for Greece in October 1994 in a home Euro 1996 qualifier against Finland, a 4–0 victory. He scored his first goal three months later, in a friendly against Cyprus at Larnaca, but had to wait until 2004 in Portugal to take part in a final stage of a tournament.

Although not a very prolific scorer, Vryzas' work ethic, his ability to create disruption among opposition defenders, his talent to create chances and open spaces for his attacking partners, in addition to his aerial ability and passing skills made him a valuable member of all the Clubs he played for, as well as the Greece national team when they won the European Championship in 2004. He was a member of the starting eleven in Greece's five out of six matches including the final, and scored an important goal, in Greece's 2–1 group stage loss to Russia. The goal sent Greece into the quarter-final, on an equal goal difference (0) against contenders Spain (Greece progressed scoring four goals to Spain’s two).

== Post-playing career ==
On 8 January 2008, Vryzas was officially appointed as the Technical Director of PAOK. He joined the club's board along with former team-mate and current chairman of the club, Theodoros Zagorakis. During his first steps in his new career he succeeded in bringing to PAOK Pablo Contreras, Zlatan Muslimović, Vieirinha, Lino and Pablo Garcia in 2008. He succeeded selling Lazaros Christodoulopoulos and Christos Melissis to Panathinaikos for €4,300,000 and Daniel Fernandes to Bochum for €1,100,000.

In July 2009, he continued and succeeded in bringing to PAOK Mirko Savini, Olivier Sorlin, Lucio Filomeno, Bruno Cirillo, Mohammed Abubakari and Vasilios Koutsianikoulis.

On 9 October 2009, Vryzas was appointed as the chairman of PAOK, following the resignation of Zagorakis for personal reasons.

On 11 August 2010, Vryzas resigned from the position of director of football from PAOK.

Five days later, he became a colleague of Fernando Santos, the head coach of Greece.

In 2012 he returned to PAOK as president and from the summer of 2014 he became their technical director. Vryzas is a misunderstanding figure in the history of the club. On 2010 PAOK were on the verge of economic collapse. There was also the scenario of the collapse of the Association in lower categories, under the weight of debts. With smart moves created a low budget team coached by Georgios Donis, which could cope economically keeping the prestige of the club up after playing in European competitions, namely the UEFA Europa League. Somewhere in mid summer of 2012, and while he had erected a Greek-Russian namely Ivan Savvides entered the club. What happened was considered as a movement from God, after Savvides had several million euro in his pocket and intended to combine its presence in Greece with sporting activities and in particular with PAOK FC. Nevertheless, Vryzas, managed and made smart moves by bringing all these years from different positions (President, Technical Director) international players who became a major asset for the club.

On 18 February 2015, few days after the heavy defeat from Atromitos, Zisis Vryzas was made available by Ivan Savvides his resignation from the post of technical director of PAOK. However, formal notice to terminate the cooperation did not exist. However, some time ago it became known through information that the club has completed all the nominal procedures for his withdrawal from the Board of Directors. He later joined Veria as technical director. On 4 July 2016, he resigned from his position.

On 9 December 2016, the Temporary Administrative Committee of Hellenic Football Federation stated that Vryzas takes all responsibilities of the Directorate of Competition, which, among other things, is also responsible for the organization of the Greek Cup. On 7 November 2018, Vryzas solved his contract with Hellenic Football Federation.

== Career statistics ==
Appearances and goals by club, season and competition
Club	Season	League			National Cup		Europe		Total	
Club	Season	Division	Apps	Goals	Apps	Goals	Apps	Goals	Apps	Goals
Skoda Xanthi	1991–92	Super League Greece	12	3	3	0	0	0	15	3
Skoda Xanthi	1992–93	Super League Greece	33	7	2	0	0	0	35	7
Skoda Xanthi	1993–94	Super League Greece	30	6	4	1	0	0	34	7
Skoda Xanthi	1994–95	Super League Greece	21	3	4	2	0	0	25	5
Skoda Xanthi	1995–96	Super League Greece	26	12	6	1	0	0	32	13
Skoda Xanthi	Total		122	31	19	4	0	0	141	35
PAOK	1996–97	Super League Greece	31	9	2	0	0	0	33	9
PAOK	1997–98	Super League Greece	30	3	8	4	5	1	43	8
PAOK	1998–99	Super League Greece	33	4	2	0	2	0	37	4
PAOK	1999–00	Super League Greece	24	3	5	1	4	0	33	4
PAOK	2000–01	Super League Greece	0	0	6	1	0	0	6	1
PAOK	Total		118	19	23	6	11	1	152	26
Perugia	2000–01	Serie A	34	9	0	0	0	0	34	9
Perugia	2001–02	Serie A	33	8	3	2	0	0	36	10
Perugia	2002–03	Serie A	30	5	5	1	2	0	37	6
Perugia	2003–04	Serie A	9	3	2	0	9	0	20	3
Perugia	Total		106	25	10	3	11	0	127	28
Fiorentina	2003–04	Serie B	20	4	0	0	0	0	20	4
Fiorentina	2004–05	Serie A	0	0	2	0	0	0	2	0
Fiorentina	2005–06	Serie A	0	0	1	0	0	0	1	0
Fiorentina	Total		20	4	3	0	0	0	23	4
Celta Vigo	2004–05	Segunda División	32	7	1	0	0	0	33	7
Torino	2005–06	Serie B	11	2	0	0	0	0	11	2
Skoda Xanthi	2006–07	Super League Greece	16	1	3	0	1	0	20	1
PAOK	2007–08	Super League Greece	13	0	1	0	0	0	14	0
Career total			438	89	60	13	23	1	521	103

== Honours ==
Perugia

- Intertoto Cup: 2003

Greece

- UEFA European Championship: 2004
