= Vieirinha =

Portuguese footballer (born 1986)

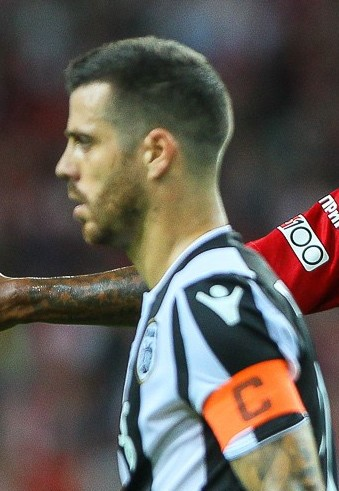
- Vieirinha playing for PAOK in 2018

Personal information
- Full name: Adelino André Vieira de Freitas
- Date of birth: 24 January 1986 (age 40)
- Place of birth: Guimarães, Portugal
- Height: 1.72 m (5 ft 8 in)
- Positions: Full-back; wing-back

Youth career
- 1995–1996: Torcatense
- 1996–2002: Vitória Guimarães
- 2002–2004: Porto

Senior career*
Years	Team	Apps	(Gls)
2004–2006	Porto B	38	(11)
2006	→ Marco (loan)	13	(4)
2006–2009	Porto	8	(0)
2007–2008	→ Leixões (loan)	22	(1)
2008–2009	→ PAOK (loan)	16	(1)
2009–2012	PAOK	67	(16)
2012–2017	VfL Wolfsburg	125	(4)
2017–2025	PAOK	133	(17)
Total		422	(54)

International career
2001	Portugal U16	6	(2)
2002–2003	Portugal U17	24	(10)
2003–2005	Portugal U19	24	(13)
2005–2006	Portugal U20	12	(1)
2007–2009	Portugal U21	17	(2)
2009	Portugal U23	4	(0)
2013–2016	Portugal	25	(1)
Medal record
Men's football
Representing Portugal
UEFA European Championship
Winner	2016 France
UEFA European U17 Championship
Winner	2003 Portugal
- * Club domestic league appearances and goals

Adelino André Vieira de Freitas ComM (born 24 January 1986), known as Vieirinha (Portuguese pronunciation: [vjɐjˈɾiɲɐ]), is a Portuguese former professional footballer who played as a winger or a full-back.

Ambidextrous, he started playing for Porto, but spent most of his professional career with PAOK and Wolfsburg. With the first club, for whom he appeared in 343 competitive matches, he won the 2018–19 and 2023–24 Super League Greece championships and three Greek Cups.

Vieirinha made his debut with the Portugal national team in 2013, and was part of the squads at the 2014 World Cup and Euro 2016, winning the latter tournament.

== Club career ==
=== Porto ===
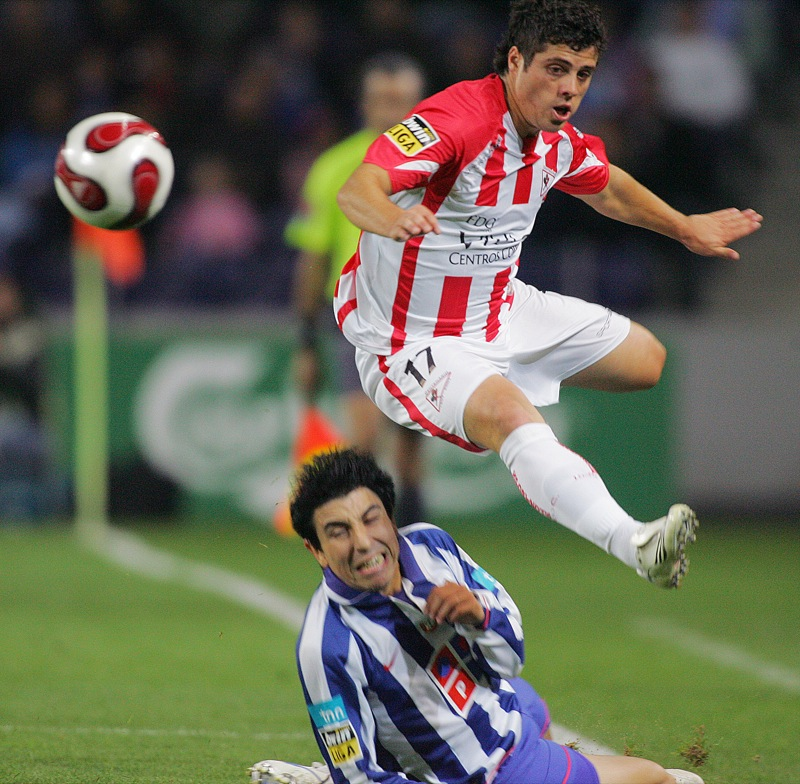
Vieirinha (top) in action for Leixões in 2007

Developed in the youth system of local Vitória de Guimarães, Vieirinha caught the interest of Porto and finished his formative years there. After a six-month loan at Segunda Liga's Marco, he joined the first team in the 2006–07 season, being given a four-year professional contract.

Vieirinha played his first official game for Porto on 11 August 2006, in the Supertaça Cândido de Oliveira against Vitória de Setúbal, coming on as a substitute in the 70th minute and scoring the game's last goal in the 89th, in a 3–0 final result.

Alongside teammates Diogo Valente and Paulo Machado, Vieirinha was loaned to Primeira Liga promotees Leixões for 2007–08. All proved instrumental as the Matosinhos side retained their league status at the end of the campaign.

=== PAOK ===
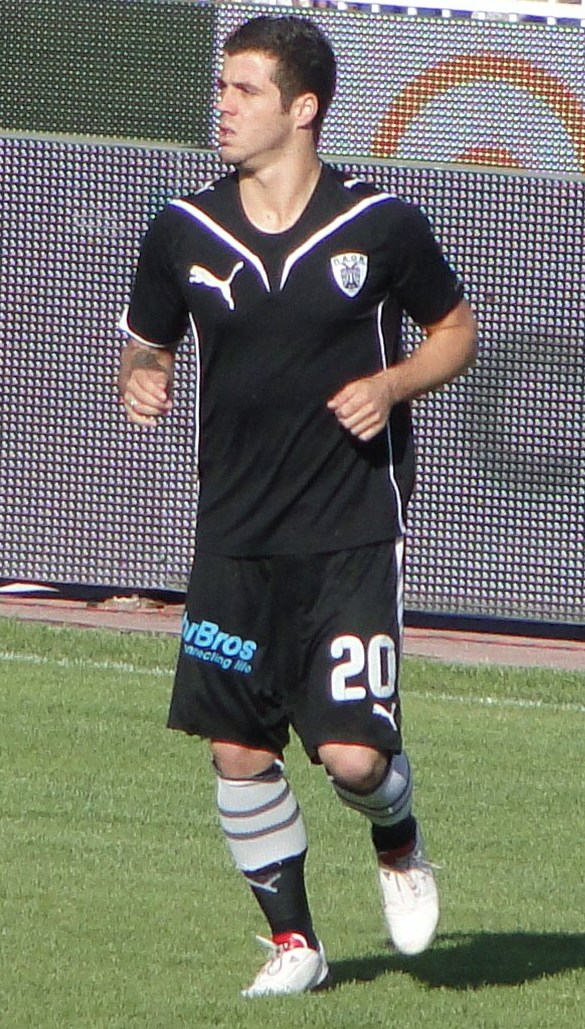
Vieirinha playing for PAOK in 2010

Vieirinha then returned to Porto, being immediately loaned to PAOK of Greece, which had expressed interest in the player as his compatriot Fernando Santos was at the club's helm at the time; a season-long loan was eventually arranged, as the player teamed up with compatriot Sérgio Conceição. After only a few games, he picked up a serious injury (torn ankle ligament) in a derby against Aris Thessaloniki, caused by Vitolo, a player who would join PAOK the following year.

In mid-July 2009, PAOK came to terms with Porto to make the move permanent for roughly €1 million, following Vieirinha's wish to continue playing under coach Santos. He renewed his link late in the year until June 2013, with a €15 million buyout clause.

On 4 November 2010, the diminutive Vieirinha scored with his head in a 1–0 home win against Villarreal in the group stage of the UEFA Europa League. He was also named the Super League's most valuable player, the second individual accolade in a row whilst at the Toumba Stadium, and his team finished in third position and qualified for the Europa League.

Despite considerable transfer market speculation owing to his increased potential, Vieirinha started 2011–12 in the same place, helping the side progress to the Europa League group phase. He played 126 matches in all competitions, scoring 28 goals and making 21 assists.

=== VfL Wolfsburg ===
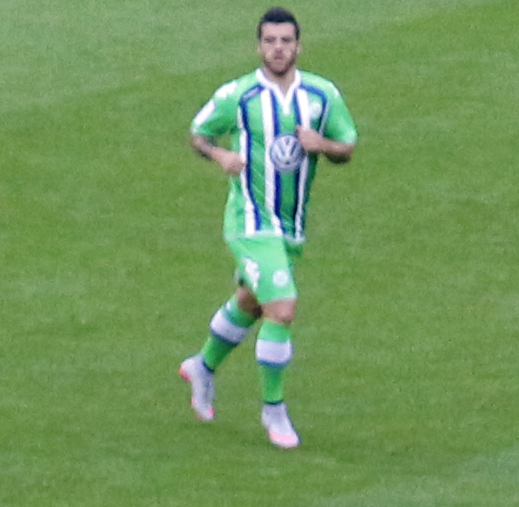
Vieirinha playing for VfL Wolfsburg

With a short statement on 3 January 2012, PAOK announced the club had come to terms regarding the transfer of Vieirinha to German side VfL Wolfsburg; the player signed until June 2015, for approximately €4 million. He made his Bundesliga debut on the 21st, playing 45 minutes in a 1–0 home victory over 1. FC Köln.

Vieirinha scored his first official goal for the Wolves on 9 March 2013, contributing to a 5–2 away rout of SC Freiburg with a volley from outside the box. In September, during a DFB-Pokal game against VfR Aalen, he ruptured his knee ligaments, going on to be sidelined until April of the following year.

Vierinha played at right-back as Wolfsburg won its first domestic cup on 30 May 2015, with a 3–1 win over Borussia Dortmund, and featured in the same position on 1 August as they claimed the DFL-Supercup against Bayern Munich in a penalty shootout. On 8 December, again as a winger, he was one of three players on target for the hosts as they defeated Manchester United 3–2 in the last round of the UEFA Champions League's group stage and progressed at the expense of their adversary.

=== Return to Greece ===
On 31 August 2017, PAOK announced the signing of Vierinha on a €1 million fee. He scored his first goal in his second spell on 20 November, netting from a penalty in a 2–1 home win against Atromitos.

On 12 May 2018, a free kick from captain Vieirinha helped the club overcome AEK Athens in the final of the Greek Cup at the Olympic Stadium, a 2–0 victory to help renew the supremacy in that tournament. For his display, he was named player of the match.

Vieirinha suffered an anterior cruciate ligament injury against AEL on 14 April 2019, going on to be sidelined for approximately six months. In spite of this, he still took the field in the 89th minute of the penultimate league fixture with Levadiakos the following weekend, as the side were mathematically crowned champions for the first time since 1985 and third overall.

On 5 March 2021, aged 35, Vieirinha renewed his contract until the summer of 2022. On 22 May, he scored the first goal from the spot as PAOK won 2–1 against league winners Olympiacos in the domestic cup final.

On 24 February 2022, Vieirinha scored in a 2–1 home victory over Midtjylland in the knockout round play-offs of the UEFA Europa Conference League, helping his team reach the round of 16 in Europe for the first time in 48 years after a penalty shootout. In June, he agreed to a one-year extension.

Vieirinha retired from professional football on 11 May 2025. In June 2026, he replaced Christos Karipidis as PAOK's technical director.

== International career ==
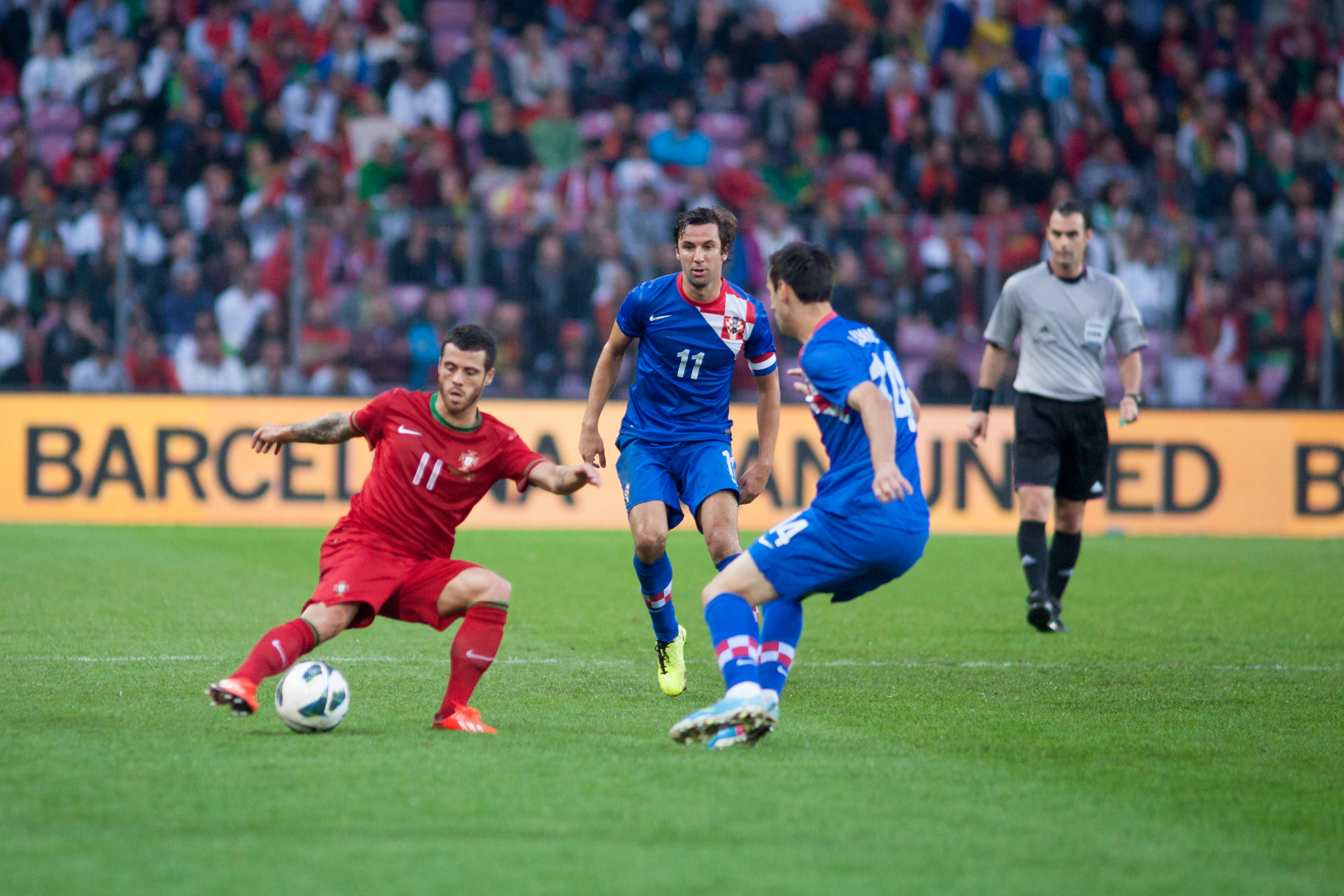
Vieirinha with Portugal in June 2013

Vieirinha featured for every youth level of the Portugal national team, from under-16 to under-21, earning a total of 83 caps and scoring 28 goals in the process. In November 2011 he received his first callup to the main squad, replacing the injured Danny for the UEFA Euro 2012 playoffs against Bosnia and Herzegovina.

Vieirinha finally made his debut for Portugal on 22 March 2013, playing the last 30 minutes in a 3–3 draw in Israel for the 2014 FIFA World Cup qualifiers. On 19 May of the following year he was named in the final 23-man squad for the finals in Brazil and, on 11 June, scored his only international goal, netting his team's fourth in a 5–1 friendly win over the Republic of Ireland in the United States four minutes after replacing Silvestre Varela. He featured once in the final stages, playing 21 minutes in the 2–1 group stage defeat of Ghana as Portugal went out on goal difference.

On 17 November 2015, Vieirinha captained the side for the only time in a 2–0 friendly victory away to Luxembourg. At the victorious Euro 2016 campaign, under former PAOK boss Santos, he was the first choice right-back during the group stage but lost his place to Southampton's Cédric Soares in the knockout phase.

== Career statistics ==
=== Club ===
Appearances and goals by club, season and competition
Club	Season	League			National cup (Note: Includes Taça de Portugal, Greek Football Cup, DFB-Pokal)		Continental		Other		Total	
Club	Season	Division	Apps	Goals	Apps	Goals	Apps	Goals	Apps	Goals	Apps	Goals
Porto B	2003–04	Segunda Divisão	3	1	—		—		—		3	1
Porto B	2004–05	Segunda Divisão	25	7	—		—		—		25	7
Porto B	2005–06	Segunda Divisão	10	3	—		—		—		10	3
Porto B	Total		38	11	—		—		—		38	11
Marco (loan)	2005–06	Segunda Liga	13	4	2	0	—		—		15	4
Porto	2006–07	Primeira Liga	8	0	1	1	1 (Note: Appearances in UEFA Champions League)	0	1 (Note: Appearance in Supertaça Cândido de Oliveira)	0	11	1
Leixões (loan)	2007–08	Primeira Liga	22	1	4	2	—		—		26	3
PAOK	2008–09	Super League Greece	16	1	0	0	—		5 (Note: Appearances in Super League Greece play-offs)	0	21	1
PAOK	2009–10	Super League Greece	28	7	2	0	2 (Note: Appearances in UEFA Europa League)	0	6	0	38	7
PAOK	2010–11	Super League Greece	26	4	4	1	12 (Note: Two appearances and one goal in UEFA Champions League, ten appearances and three goals in UEFA Europa League)	4	5	2	47	11
PAOK	2011–12	Super League Greece	13	5	0	0	9	4	—		22	9
PAOK	Total		83	17	6	1	23	8	16	2	128	28
VfL Wolfsburg	2011–12	Bundesliga	9	0	0	0	—		—		9	0
VfL Wolfsburg	2012–13	Bundesliga	27	1	5	0	—		—		32	1
VfL Wolfsburg	2013–14	Bundesliga	11	1	3	0	—		—		14	1
VfL Wolfsburg	2014–15	Bundesliga	31	1	5	0	10	1	—		46	2
VfL Wolfsburg	2015–16	Bundesliga	26	1	2	0	8	1	1 (Note: Appearance in DFL-Supercup)	0	37	2
VfL Wolfsburg	2016–17	Bundesliga	21	0	2	0	—		2 (Note: Appearances in Bundesliga relegation play-offs)	1	25	1
VfL Wolfsburg	Total		125	4	17	0	18	2	3	1	163	7
PAOK	2017–18	Super League Greece	25	2	5	1	—		—		30	3
PAOK	2018–19	Super League Greece	26	5	2	1	8	0	—		36	6
PAOK	2019–20	Super League Greece	17	5	3	1	—		3	0	23	6
PAOK	2020–21	Super League Greece	15	4	4	1	—		6	0	25	5
PAOK	2021–22	Super League Greece	19	1	4	0	13 (Note: Appearances in UEFA Europa Conference League)	1	2	0	38	2
PAOK	2022–23	Super League Greece	10	0	6	0	1	0	5	0	22	0
PAOK	2023–24	Super League Greece	13	0	1	0	9	1	4	1	27	2
PAOK	2024–25	Super League Greece	8	0	2	0	2	0	2	0	14	0
PAOK	Total		133	17	27	4	33	2	22	1	215	24
PAOK total			216	34	33	5	56	10	38	3	343	52
Career total			422	54	57	8	75	12	42	4	596	78

=== International ===
List of international goals scored by Vieirinha
#	Date	Venue	Opponent	Score	Result	Competition
1	10 June 2014	MetLife Stadium, East Rutherford, United States	Republic of Ireland	4–1	5–1	Friendly

== Honours ==
Porto

- Primeira Liga: 2006–07
- Supertaça Cândido de Oliveira: 2006

Wolfsburg

- DFB-Pokal: 2014–15
- DFL-Supercup: 2015

PAOK

- Super League Greece: 2018–19, 2023–24
- Greek Football Cup: 2017–18, 2018–19, 2020–21

Portugal U17

- UEFA European Under-17 Championship: 2003

Portugal

- UEFA European Championship: 2016

Individual

- Super League Greece Best Foreign Player: 2010–11, 2018–19
- Greek Football Cup Final MVP: 2017–18
- Super League Greece Team of the Season: 2017–18, 2018–19
- PAOK MVP of the Season: 2010–11, 2017–18, 2018–19
- Bundesliga Team of the Year: 2014–15

Orders

- Commander of the Order of Merit
