= Pablo Contreras =

Chilean footballer (born 1978)

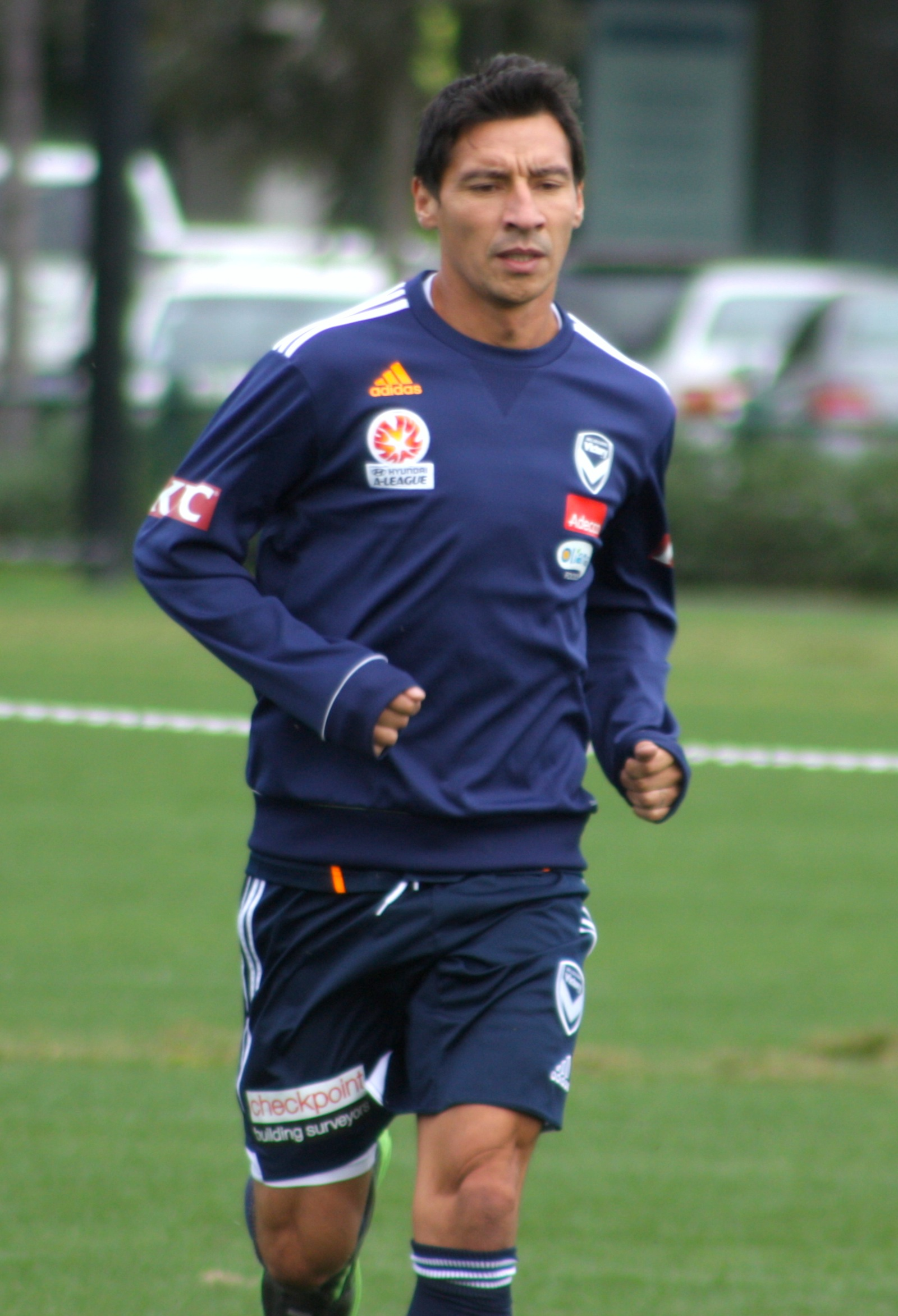
- Contreras with Melbourne Victory in 2013

Personal information
- Full name: Pablo Andrés Contreras Fica
- Date of birth: 11 September 1978 (age 48)
- Place of birth: Santiago, Chile
- Height: 1.81 m (5 ft 11 in)
- Position: Centre back

Youth career
- 1991–1996: Colo-Colo

Senior career*
Years	Team	Apps	(Gls)
1997–1999	Colo-Colo	36	(2)
1999–2001	Monaco	26	(0)
2001	→ Racing Club (loan)	8	(0)
2001–2008	Celta Vigo	101	(6)
2001–2002	→ Osasuna (loan)	31	(1)
2002–2003	→ Sporting CP (loan)	30	(2)
2008	Braga	13	(0)
2008–2012	PAOK	84	(6)
2012	Colo-Colo	16	(0)
2012–2013	Olympiacos	17	(1)
2013–2014	Melbourne Victory	20	(0)
Total		382	(18)

International career
1995	Chile U17		
1997	Chile U20		
2000	Chile U23	12	(1)
1999–2012	Chile	67	(2)
- * Club domestic league appearances and goals

Pablo Andrés Contreras Fica (Spanish pronunciation: [ˈpaβlo konˈtɾeɾas]; born 11 September 1978) is a Chilean retired footballer, who played as a centre back or even as a right back.

Contreras began his career at Colo-Colo. He earned his first senior honours in 1997, winning the Chilean Primera División title. He also won an Olympic bronze medal with Chile in the Sydney Games. Contreras moved to Europe in 1999, signing with French side Monaco, where he won the Ligue 1 in his first season.

After his spell in France, he was loaned to Argentine Primera División club Racing Club in 2001, and the next season Contreras joined Spain's La Liga side Celta de Vigo in a €4.2 million transfer deal. He was immediately loaned to Osasuna and then to Sporting CP, playing in the UEFA Champions League, before returning after to Celta. He played over 100 matches with the Galician club until the 2006–07 season, after Celta's relegation to the Segunda División, after which he decided to leave the club. He signed a six-month contract with Braga in January 2008 before moving in June of that year to Super League Greece side PAOK. In the middle of the 2011–12 season, Conteras left the club due to the Greek government debt-crisis and opted to return to Colo-Colo, coached by Ivo Basay at the time.

A Chilean international on 66 occasions, Contreras was part of squad that earned the bronze medal in the 2000 Summer Olympics at Sydney. In his country, Pablo is nicknamed Espartaco by Chilevisión relator Paulo Flores specifically, referred him as the Spartan hero of his national team during the matches, when Contreras was under the orders of Claudio Borghi in Chile.

== Club career ==
=== Colo-Colo ===
Born in Santiago, Contreras made his way through Colo-Colo's youth ranks, alongside fellow stopper David Henríquez, as the club was then managed by former international – also a defender – Pedro Reyes. He made his professional debuts in 1997, helping the club to two first division titles and appearing in 37 first-team matches in the next two seasons.

=== Monaco ===
Afterwards, Contreras made a move to Monaco of France. At the young age of 21, he was an important element in Monaco's league and Supercup victories of 2000. He also appeared for the club in both the UEFA Cup and UEFA Champions League.

In January 2001, however, it was discovered that Contreras was using a fake Italian passport in order to gain European Union status. A Paris court fined the player €30,000, and he received a two-year ban.

Monaco was then forced to loan Contreras out to another team, and he moved to Argentina with Racing Club. Shortly after, in July 2001, he was sold to Celta de Vigo for €4.2 million.

=== Osasuna ===
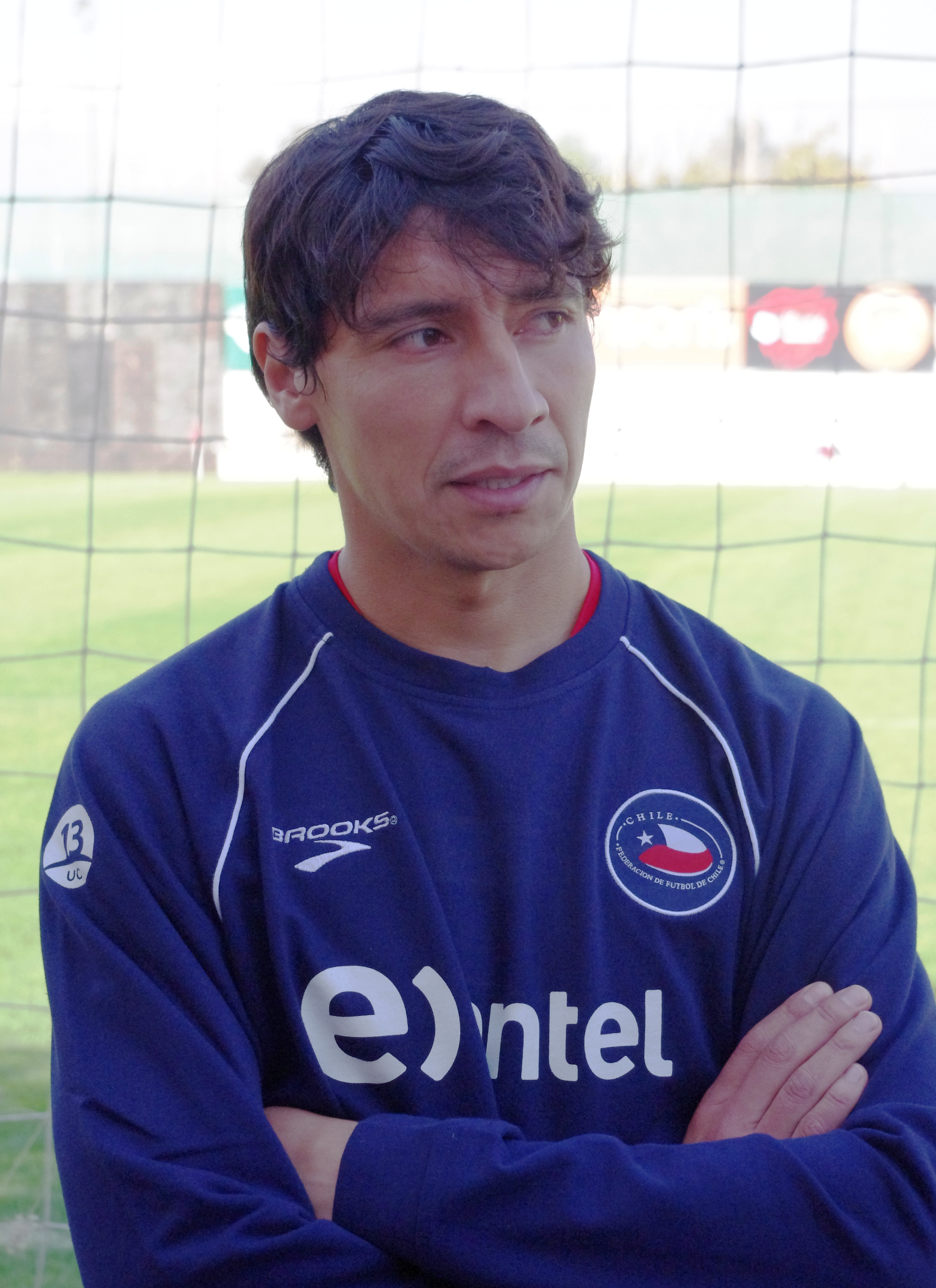
Pablo Contreras in 2010.

Contreras did not join Celta immediately, being loaned to fellow La Liga side Osasuna. Immediately cast into the Navarrese's starting XI, he made 31 league appearances, but the club could only finish 17th, narrowly avoiding relegation.

=== Sporting CP ===
For the following season, another loan ensued, now to Portugal with giants Sporting CP, where he once again started throughout the season, with the Lions winning no silverware at all; they were also eliminated in the Champions League qualifying rounds by Internazionale.

=== Celta ===
In the summer of 2003, 25-year old Contreras finally moved to Celta. He appeared rarely in his debut season, as the Galicians were participating for the first time ever in the Champions League. He appeared in seven games as Celta eventually lost in the round of 16 to Arsenal, but also saw his team relegate to Segunda División, after a 19th-place finish in the league. Contreras became first-choice for Celta in the following seasons but, after another relegation, in 2006–07, was deemed surplus to requirements by the coaching staff (Bulgarian Hristo Stoichkov was one of four during the unsuccessful campaign in division two), and left the club in January 2008, after being released from his contract.

=== Braga ===
Contreras returned to Portugal after four years, joining Braga on a six-month contract, and was regularly used during his spell, helping his team finish seventh.

=== PAOK ===
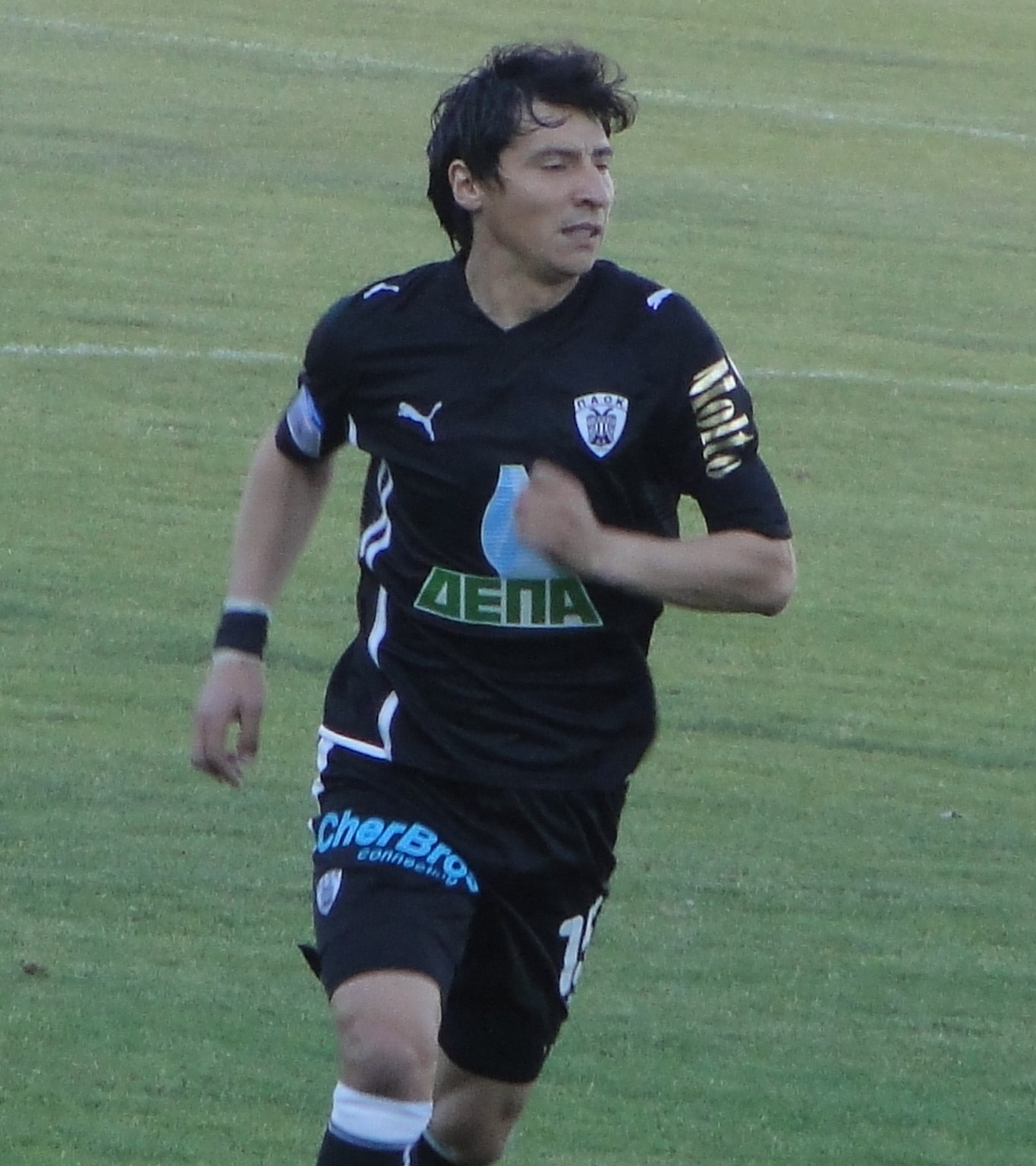
Pablo Contreras playing for PAOK in 2010.

In June 2008, Contreras agreed to a two-year link with Greek club PAOK, citing his trust in former Celta teammate Zisis Vryzas – and the club's chairman Theodoros Zagorakis – as the main factors for his move, refusing also the opportunity of return to Colo-Colo, because the club offered him a very high salary. He made his official debut for the team on 30 August in a 2–0 away win over OFI and his first goal came in an important 1–0 home victory in the derby against Aris. On 24 December, was reported that Contreras would join Italian Serie A club Reggina during New Year's Eve, though the move never materialized. On 21 February, he scored his second official goal for PAOK against another traditional derby of the club, Iraklis, that PAOK won thanks to him. He was promoted to team captain in his second season, alongside Sérgio Conceição, who retired shortly after.

In late January 2011, shortly before a match against Aris, he was informed of the loss of his father, but opted to leave for his country only after the game. On 2 January 2012, Contreras mutually terminated his contract with PAOK.

=== Return to Colo-Colo ===
On 7 January 2012, it was confirmed that Contreras was returning to Chilean club Colo-Colo, after several rumours of a possible move to Argentina's Colón and also other European and American clubs. On 19 January, he made his unofficial debut in an exhibition match against Unión Temuco, where he played very well despite a 2–1 defeat. After the pre-season in Temuco, Contreras played well for his team, now in the Noche Alba against Peruvian side Alianza Lima at the Estadio Monumental. On 29 January, Contreras played his first competitive match of the season against Deportes Iquique in a 0–0 home draw, thus being his first competitive match for Colo-Colo since his return. He instantly became an irreplaceable player for coach Ivo Basay, helping the team win important games during his tenure, for example against Cobreloa at Calama and O'Higgins in the capital, thus becoming a mainstay centre back for Basay's team. On 14 April, his assist to Rodrigo Millar for the first goal in the derby against Universidad Católica, salvaged a 1–1 draw at the Estadio Monumental for the first match under new head coach Luis Pérez after Basay's departure, who abandoned the club after a 4–2 away loss against Unión Española. After Esteban Paredes moved to Atlante, Pablo became Colo-Colo's captain due to his experience and tenure.

=== Olympiacos ===
On 16 August 2012, Contreras returned to Greece, signing a contract with Olympiacos. On 27 August, he made his debut with in an away win against Veria. On 27 January, he scored the only goal in a 1–0 away win against Panthrakikos.

=== Melbourne Victory ===
On 22 September 2013, it was confirmed Contreras signed for Australian club Melbourne Victory. Contreras made his debut in Round 1 against Melbourne Heart, playing the full 90 minutes. He was, however, suspended after the match for two games due to an off-the-ball incident where he blocked an opponent in the derby match.

In January 2014, Contreras announced on Chilean radio that he would retire at the end of the season. Strong performances near the end of the season, however, prompted speculation that Contreras might play on with the Victory for the 2014–15 season, albeit on reduced wages. Shortly after Melbourne Victory's semi-loss against eventual A-League champions Brisbane Roar, however, he confirmed his retirement.

== International career ==
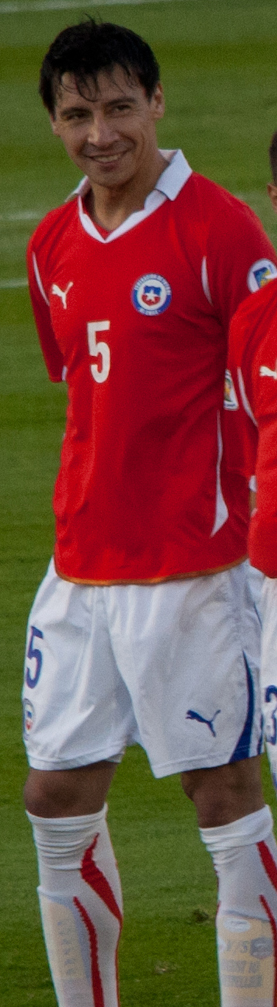
Contreras playing for Chile in 2011.

As a youth player, Contreras represented Chile at under-17 level in the 1995 South American Championship and at under-20 level in the 1997 South American Championship.

Contreras made his debut for Chile team on 17 February 1999 against Guatemala. He was then picked for that year's Copa América in Paraguay, helping the national side finish in fourth position.

In 2000, Contreras participated at the 2000 Summer Olympics, where Chile won the bronze medal, and the player was named one of the best defenders in the tournament. He also featured prominently in qualification for the 2002 and 2006 FIFA World Cup, with Chile failing to make the final stages on both occasions.

One of the darkest moments in Contreras' career happened during the 2007 Copa América. Alongside Reinaldo Navia, Jorge Valdivia, Rodrigo Tello, Jorge Vargas and Álvaro Ormeño, he was involved in an incident at the team's hotel involving the staff. The employees claimed the team players were celebrating drunk, throwing food, and destroying hotel property after qualifying for the second round of the tournament – Chile lost the next game 6–1 against Brazil.

Afterwards, national coach Nelson Acosta resigned and all the players involved were suspended for 20 games by the ANFP. After serving ten games, Contreras, as well as the other players involved – with the exception of Ormeño – signed a letter admitting their involvement and apologizing for the incident, and the punishment was lifted. After being reinstated, Contreras became an important member under Marcelo Bielsa, as Chile qualified for the World Cup in South Africa, the nation's first in 12 years. Contreras became the second-captain, after goalkeeper Claudio Bravo, when the team was managed by Claudio Borghi.

== Career statistics ==
=== Club ===
Appearances and goals by club, season and competition
Club	Season	League			National cup		League cup		Continental		Other		Total	
Club	Season	Division	Apps	Goals	Apps	Goals	Apps	Goals	Apps	Goals	Apps	Goals	Apps	Goals
Colo-Colo	1997	Chilean Primera División	1	0	—		—		—		—		1	0
Colo-Colo	1998	Chilean Primera División	23	1	3	0	—		5	0	—		31	1
Colo-Colo	1999	Chilean Primera División	12	1	—		—		8	0	—		20	1
Colo-Colo	Total		36	2	3	0	—		13	0	—		52	2
Monaco	1999–2000	Division 1	17	0	1	0	1	0	5	0	—		24	0
Monaco	2000–01	Division 1	9	0	0	0	0	0	3	1	1	0	13	1
Monaco	Total		26	0	1	0	1	0	8	1	1	0	37	1
Racing Club (loan)	2001–02	Argentine Primera División	8	0	—		—		—		—		8	0
Celta Vigo	2003–04	La Liga	6	1	1	0	—		7	0	—		14	1
Celta Vigo	2004–05	Segunda División	33	1	1	1	—		—		—		34	2
Celta Vigo	2005–06	La Liga	29	4	2	0	—		—		—		31	4
Celta Vigo	2006–07	La Liga	30	0	2	0	—		5	0	—		37	0
Celta Vigo	2007–08	Segunda División	3	0	0	0	—		—		—		3	0
Celta Vigo	Total		101	6	6	1	—		12	0	—		119	7
Osasuna (loan)	2001–02	La Liga	31	1	0	0	—		—		—		31	1
Sporting CP (loan)	2002–03	Primeira Liga	30	2	4	0	—		3	1	1	0	38	3
Braga	2007–08	Primeira Liga	13	0	0	0	—		1	0	—		14	0
PAOK	2008–09	Super League Greece	28	2	3	0	—		—		—		31	2
PAOK	2009–10	Super League Greece	23	1	3	0	—		—		—		26	1
PAOK	2010–11	Super League Greece	27	3	5	0	—		11	0	—		43	3
PAOK	2011–12	Super League Greece	6	0	0	0	—		5	0	—		11	0
PAOK	Total		84	6	11	0	—		16	0	—		111	6
Colo-Colo	2012	Chilean Primera División	16	0	—		—		—		—		16	0
Olympiacos	2012–13	Super League Greece	17	1	4	0	—		6	0	—		27	1
Melbourne Victory	2013–14	A-League	20	0	—		—		4	1	—		24	1
Career total			382	18	29	1	1	0	63	3	2	0	477	22

=== International ===
Appearances and goals by national team and year
National team	Year	Apps	Goals
Chile	1999	6	0
Chile	2000	4	0
Chile	2001	2	0
Chile	2002	1	0
Chile	2003	8	1
Chile	2004	4	0
Chile	2005	5	0
Chile	2006	5	0
Chile	2007	6	0
Chile	2008	4	0
Chile	2009	4	0
Chile	2010	4	0
Chile	2011	11	1
Chile	2012	3	0
Total		67	2

Date	Venue	Opponent	Score	Result	Competition
30 April 2003	Estadio Nacional de Chile, Santiago, Chile	Costa Rica	1–0	1–0	Friendly
15 November 2011	Estadio Nacional de Chile, Santiago, Chile	Paraguay	1–0	2–0	2014 World Cup qualification

== Honours ==
Colo-Colo

- Primera División de Chile: 1997 Clausura, 1998

Monaco

- Ligue 1: 1999–2000
- Trophée des Champions: 2000

Sporting CP

- Supertaça Cândido de Oliveira: 2002

Olympiacos

- Super League Greece: 2012–13
- Greek Football Cup: 2012–13

Chile

- Summer Olympic Games bronze medal: 2000

Individual

- MVP 2008–09
