= Vitolo (footballer, born 1983) =

Spanish footballer

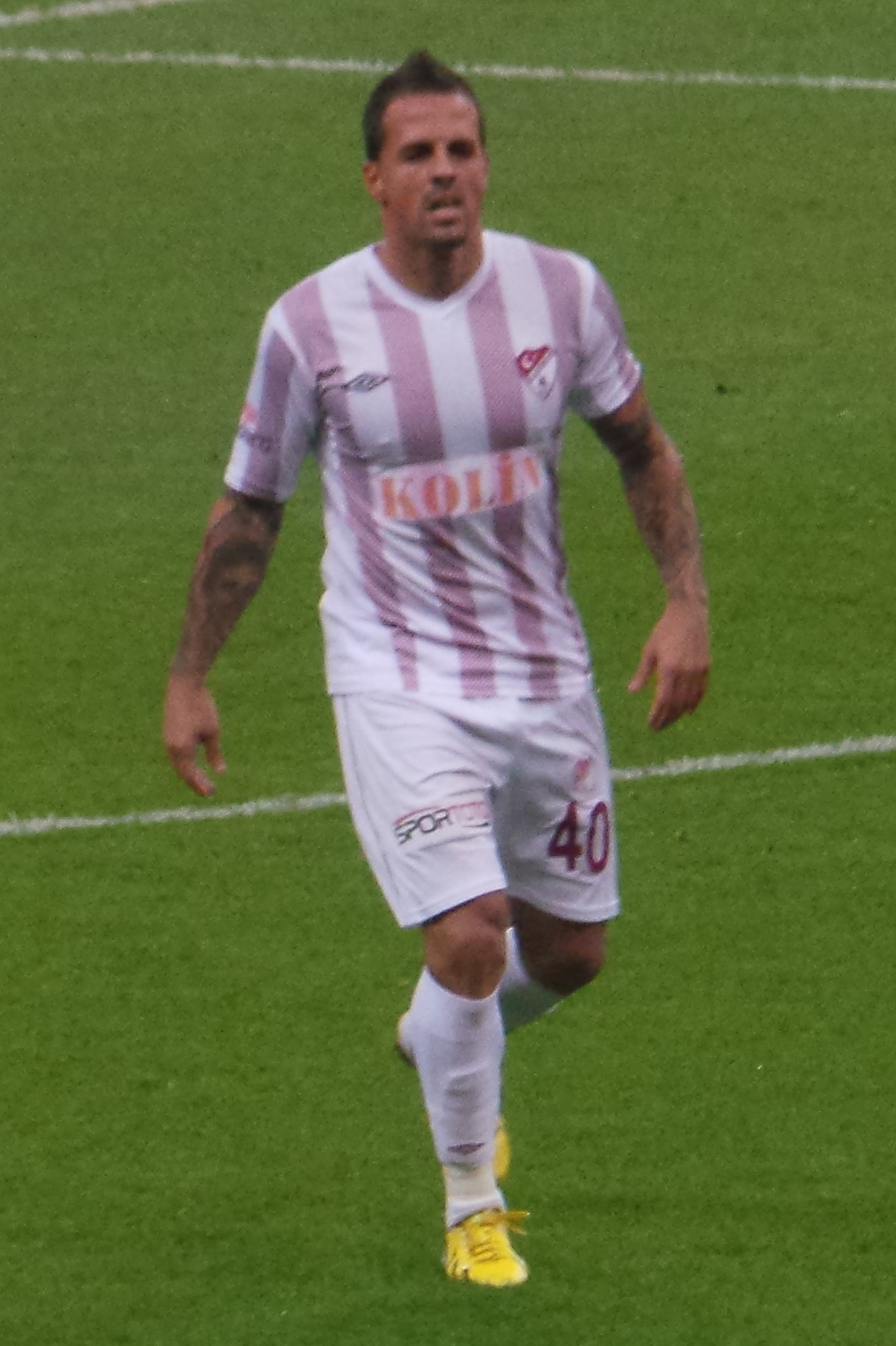
- Vitolo playing for Elazığspor in 2013

Personal information
- Full name: Víctor José Añino Bermúdez
- Date of birth: 9 September 1983 (age 43)
- Place of birth: Santa Cruz de Tenerife, Spain
- Height: 1.68 m (5 ft 6 in)
- Position: Defensive midfielder

Team information
- Current team: Real Unión Tenerife

Youth career
- Tenerife

Senior career*
Years	Team	Apps	(Gls)
2001–2003	Tenerife B	20	(0)
2001–2005	Tenerife	69	(1)
2005–2008	Racing Santander	66	(0)
2007–2008	→ Celta (loan)	34	(0)
2008–2009	Aris	21	(0)
2009–2011	PAOK	51	(3)
2011–2013	Panathinaikos	51	(4)
2013–2014	Elazığspor	11	(0)
2014–2018	Tenerife	141	(5)
2018–2019	Cartagena	30	(0)
2019–2024	Santa Úrsula	136	(1)
2025–	Real Unión Tenerife	1	(0)

International career
2003	Spain U20	6	(0)
2004–2005	Spain U21	12	(0)
- * Club domestic league appearances and goals as of 14 September 2025

Víctor José Añino Bermúdez (born 9 September 1983), known as Vitolo, is a Spanish professional footballer who plays as a defensive midfielder for Tercera Federación club Real Unión de Tenerife.

He began his career at Tenerife, going on to appear in 67 a total of La Liga matches for that club and Racing de Santander and returning to the former in 2014. He also competed extensively in Greece, mainly with PAOK and Panathinaikos.

Vitolo won 18 caps for Spain at youth level, being runner-up with the under-20 team at the 2003 World Cup.

== Club career ==
Vitolo was born in Santa Cruz de Tenerife, Canary Islands. A product of CD Tenerife's youth system, he played one match for the first team during the 2001–02 season as the club returned to the Segunda División one year after being promoted. He made his debut in La Liga on 16 September 2001, coming on as a 76th-minute substitute in a 2–0 home win against Villarreal CF.

From 2005 to 2007, Vitolo was a key midfield element for Racing de Santander, which finished tenth in the top division in the latter campaign. After some problems with newly appointed coach Marcelino García Toral, however, he would spend 2007–08 on loan to another side in the second tier, RC Celta de Vigo.

With the Galicians, Vitolo did not manage to return to the Spanish top flight, and his buyout clause of approximately €3 million was not activated, so the player returned to Cantabria. In August 2008, however, he terminated his contract and joined Aris Thessaloniki FC. Under compatriot Quique Hernández, he eventually developed into a key midfield element in his only season.

Vitolo signed a four-year deal with PAOK FC on 27 July 2009. He scored his first goal in Greece against his former club, in a 4–1 derby win.

On 13 July 2011, Vitolo was released by PAOK. Later in the same day he signed with another team in the country's Super League, Panathinaikos FC, agreeing to a three-year contract.

In the summer of 2013, Vitolo was released by Panathinaikos and joined Super Lig's Elazığspor for three years. However, in February of the following year he cut ties with the club, playing his last game in December 2013 in a 1–0 home victory over Rizespor; the side were eventually relegated in May, after ranking third-bottom.

Vitolo returned to Tenerife on 18 June 2014, after signing a two-year deal.

== International career ==
Vitolo represented Spain at the 2003 FIFA World Youth Championship held at the United Arab Emirates, alongside the likes of Sergio García and Andrés Iniesta. During the competition he played holding midfielder with notable performances, as the team went on to lose 1–0 to Brazil in the final.

Eventually, Vitolo progressed to the under-21s.

== Career statistics ==
As of 7 May 2016

Club performance			League		Cup		Continental		Total	
Season	Club	League	Apps	Goals	Apps	Goals	Apps	Goals	Apps	Goals
Spain			League		Copa del Rey		Europe		Total	
2001–02	Tenerife	La Liga	1	0	0	0	0	0	1	0
2002–03	Tenerife	Segunda División	2	0	0	0	0	0	2	0
2003–04	Tenerife	Segunda División	31	0	1	0	0	0	32	0
2004–05	Tenerife	Segunda División	35	1	2	0	0	0	37	1
2005–06	Racing	La Liga	33	0	2	0	0	0	35	0
2006–07	Racing	La Liga	33	0	1	0	0	0	34	0
2007–08	Celta	Segunda División	34	0	3	1	0	0	37	1
Greece			League		Greek Cup		Europe		Total	
2008–09	Aris	Super League Greece	21	0	3	0	0	0	24	0
2009–10	PAOK	Super League Greece	26	1	3	0	2	0	31	1
2010–11	PAOK	Super League Greece	25	2	1	0	10	0	36	2
2011–12	Panathinaikos	Super League Greece	25	0	2	0	1	0	28	0
2012–13	Panathinaikos	Super League Greece	26	4	3	0	10	1	39	5
Turkey			Süper Lig		Turkish Cup		Europe		Total	
2013–14	Elazığspor	Süper Lig	11	0	4	0	0	0	15	0
Spain			League		Copa del Rey		Europe		Total	
2014–15	Tenerife	Segunda División	38	5	1	0	0	0	39	5
2015–16	Tenerife	Segunda División	36	0	0	0	0	0	36	0
Total	Spain		243	6	10	1	0	0	253	7
Total	Greece		122	5	12	0	23	1	157	6
Total	Turkey		11	0	4	0	0	0	15	0
Career total			376	11	26	1	23	1	425	13

== Honours ==
Spain U20

- FIFA U-20 World Cup runner-up: 2003
