= Lucio Filomeno =

Argentine footballer (born 1980)

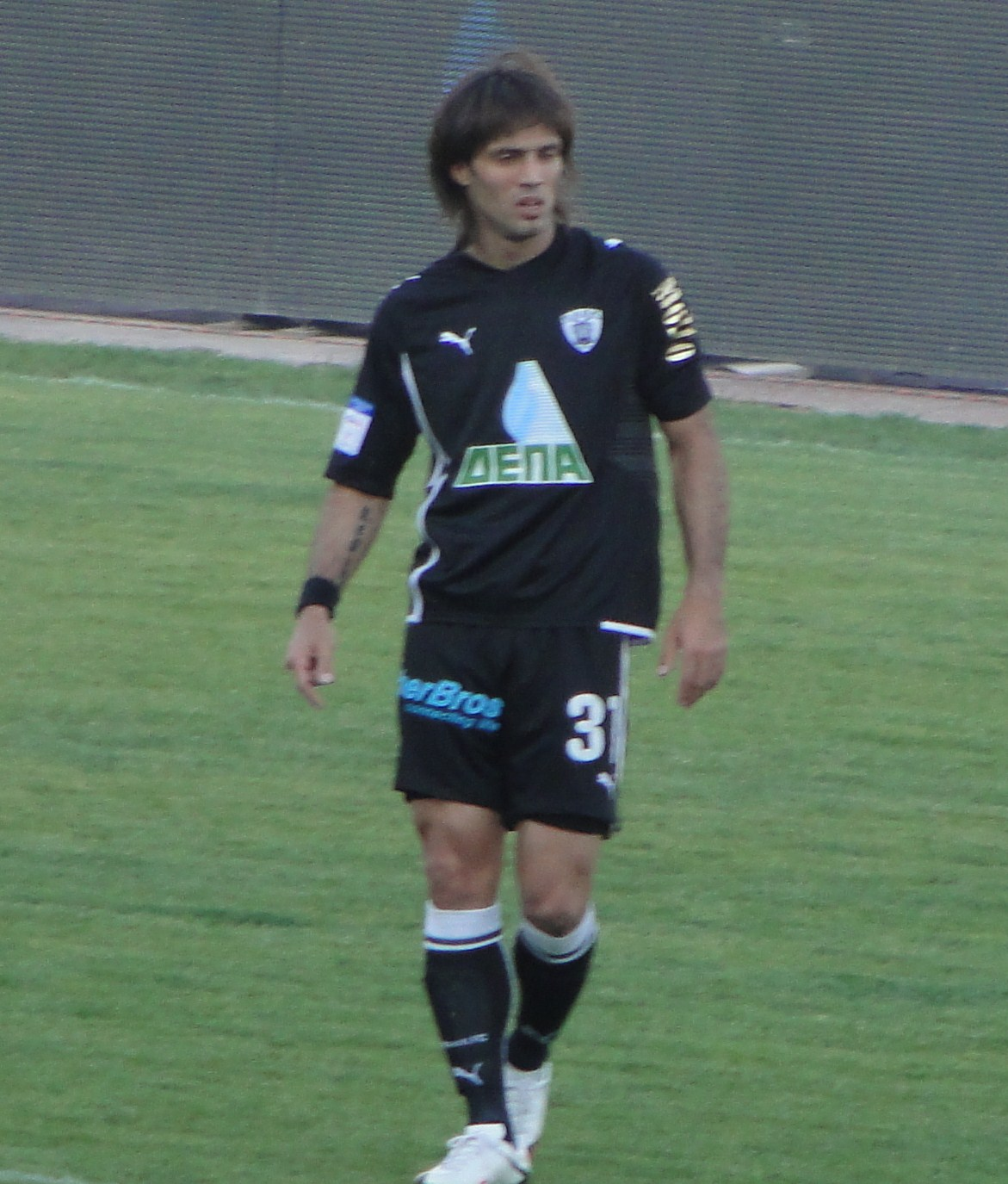

Personal information
- Full name: Lucio Alejo Filomeno
- Date of birth: 8 May 1980 (age 46)
- Place of birth: Capital Federal, Argentina
- Height: 5 ft 11 in (1.80 m)
- Position: Striker

Youth career
- 1988–1994: Nueva Chicago

Senior career*
Years	Team	Apps	(Gls)
1995–1997	Nueva Chicago	32	(12)
1998	Udinese	0	(0)
1998–1999	Inter Milan	0	(0)
2000–2002	San Lorenzo	21	(4)
2002–2004	Chiapas	68	(13)
2005	Busan IPark	0	(0)
2005–2006	D.C. United	12	(1)
2006–2007	Nueva Chicago	24	(8)
2007–2009	Asteras Tripolis	57	(21)
2009–2011	PAOK	24	(1)
2011–2012	Atlético de Rafaela	7	(0)
2013–2014	Acassuso	10	(1)
- * Club domestic league appearances and goals as of 8 December 2013

Lucio Filomeno (born 8 May 1980) is a former Argentine footballer who played as a striker. His last club was Acassuso. After growing up in Haedo, Buenos Aires, Filomeno played for a variety of clubs around the world and also for the Argentina U-16 national team.

== Club career ==
Filomeno made his professional debut in March 1996 playing for Nueva Chicago while still 15 years old. He was one of the youngest players to this day to start playing professionally in Argentina. He was then noticed by English club Newcastle United F.C. and made his first move to Europe. He did not play officially for Newcastle and moved to Italy where he signed first for Udinese and then for Inter Milan. A year later he returned to Argentina to join San Lorenzo de Almagro where he contributed to the club winning of the Argentine "Torneo Clausura" 2001 and the Southamerican "Copa Mercosur" 2001. Subsequently, he moved to Mexico where he joined Jaguares de Chiapas in their inaugural 2002 season, scoring the team's first goal ever in a 3–1 loss to Tigres.

In 2005, he joined South Korean side Busan IPark in K League 1, but he appeared in only League Cup 8 matches. A brief spell at D.C. United followed where he struggled to play for the first team and only scored once.

In 2006, he returned to Argentina to join his original club, Nueva Chicago. In the summer of 2007 he was signed by Greek first division club Asteras Tripolis and in June 2009 he was picked up on a two-year deal by Greek club PAOK FC. He had signed a one-year deal with Atlético de Rafaela of the Argentinian first division on August 4, 2011. He played for one season and then he stopped. In summer 2013, he signed with Acassuso playing in Primera B Metropolitana, the regionalised third division of the Argentine football league system.

== Honors ==
D.C. United

- Major League Soccer Supporter's Shield: 2006
