= Mirko Savini =

Italian footballer

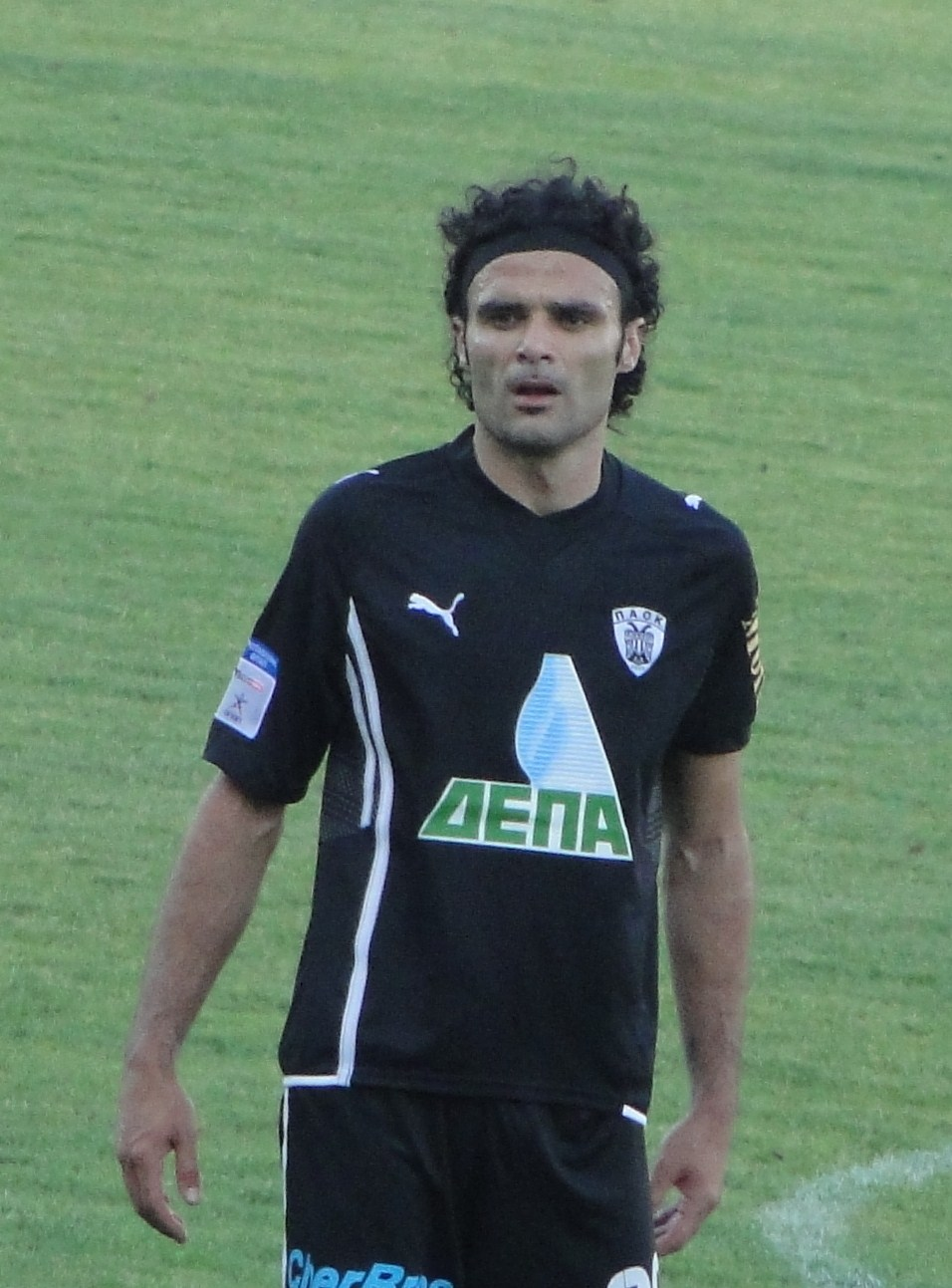

Personal information
- Date of birth: 11 March 1979 (age 47)
- Place of birth: Rome, Italy
- Height: 1.82 m (5 ft 11 1/2 in)
- Position: Left back

Team information
- Current team: Ascoli (assistant)

Senior career*
Years	Team	Apps	(Gls)
1996–2000	Lodigiani	92	(1)
2000–2002	Fermana	60	(0)
2002–2004	Ascoli	45	(0)
2004–2005	Fiorentina	31	(0)
2005–2008	Napoli	72	(0)
2008–2009	Palermo	11	(0)
2009–2011	PAOK	23	(1)
- * Club domestic league appearances and goals

Mirko Savini (born 11 March 1979, Rome) is a former Italian footballer who played as defender, currently working for Ascoli as an assistant coach.

== Career ==
Savini spent most of his early career playing at lower division level, and reached Serie B only in 2002 with Ascoli. He was then signed by Serie B fallen giants Fiorentina in 2004, where he achieved promotion to the top flight, but then he chose to join Napoli instead, where he became protagonist of the club's comeback to Serie A; with Napoli, he finally had the chance to mark his debut in the Italian top flight. He left Napoli in January 2009 to accept a 6-month contract with another Serie A club, Palermo, but this was not extended at the end of the season and he left the Sicilians in a free transfer in July 2009.

He was player of Greek club PAOK FC, from July 2009 until August 2011, when he terminated his contract with the club. During his PAOK spells, Savini was mostly used as a second choice for a left-back or a center-back. Nevertheless, whenever he was called upon to fill in, he pulled out very positive appearances.

== Retirement ==
In 2012, he became a coaching assistant of the reserve team of Pescara Calcio. He obtained certificate to coach youth team on 30 June 2012. After Cristian Bucchi was promoted to the first team as head coach in March 2013, Savini and Ermanno Ciotti, both assistants of Bucchi in the reserve, became the new Collaboratori tecnici of the first team. He successively followed on Bucchi's footsteps at his assistant at all his jobs, the most recent one being in 2022–23 at Ascoli.
