= Olivier Sorlin =

French footballer (born 1979)

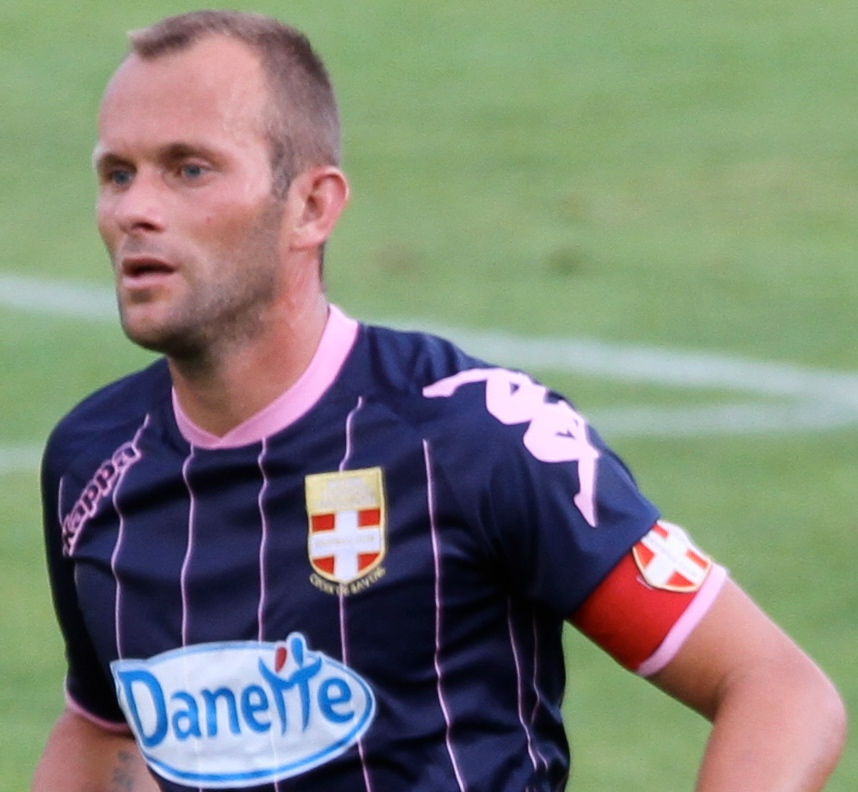
- Sorlin in 2012

Personal information
- Date of birth: 9 April 1979 (age 47)
- Place of birth: Saint-Étienne, France
- Height: 1.83 m (6 ft 0 in)
- Position: Midfielder

Youth career
- 1992–1995: Saint-Étienne
- 1995–1997: Montferrand

Senior career*
Years	Team	Apps	(Gls)
1997–1999	Valence	47	(4)
1999–2002	Montpellier	69	(5)
2002–2005	Rennes	111	(10)
2005–2006	Monaco	20	(1)
2006–2009	Rennes	78	(0)
2009–2010	PAOK	37	(3)
2010–2016	Evian	200	(4)
2016–2018	Annecy	28	(0)
Total		590	(27)

International career
1999–2002	France U21	26	(9)
Medal record
Men's football
Representing France
UEFA European Under-21 Championship
Runner-up	2002 Switzerland
- * Club domestic league appearances and goals

Olivier Sorlin (born 9 April 1979) is a French former professional footballer who played as a midfielder. He spent most of his career playing in France.

== Career ==
Sorlin was born in Saint-Étienne, Loire.

Out of favour during his sixth season with Rennes, he took the opportunity to play abroad, and transferred to PAOK FC in January 2009. Following a very successful six-month loan, Sorlin signed a new two-year contract with the club in June 2009, after PAOK came to terms with Rennes.

On 29 August 2010, after the first game of the 2010–11 season, Sorlin suddenly asked for his contract to be broken so he could leave the club, citing that major family problems required him to return to France. According to his agent, Sorlin had already made some contacts with Evian, competing in Ligue 2, to continue his career in France.

== Honours ==
Montpellier

- UEFA Intertoto Cup: 1999
