= 2019–20 Super League Greece =

84th season of top-tier football league in Greece

Super League 1
- Season: 2019–20
- Dates: 24 August 2019 – 19 July 2020
- Champions: Olympiacos; 45th Greek title
- Relegated: Panionios; Xanthi
- Champions League: Olympiacos; PAOK
- Europa League: AEK Athens; Aris; OFI
- Matches: 193
- Goals: 467 (2.42 per match)
- Best player: Marko Livaja
- Top goalscorer: Youssef El-Arabi (20 goals)
- Biggest home win: Olympiacos 5–0 Volos (14 September 2019); AEK Athens 5–0 Panionios (7 December 2019); Asteras Tripolis 5–0 Xanthi (21 December 2019)
- Biggest away win: Asteras Tripolis 0–5 Olympiacos (15 December 2019)
- Highest scoring: PAOK 5–1 Atromitos (23 December 2019); Aris 4–2 PAOK (4 January 2020); Olympiacos 4–2 Aris (19 January 2020)
- Longest winning run: Olympiacos (10 matches)
- Longest unbeaten run: Olympiacos (33 matches)
- Longest losing run: Panetolikos (5 matches)
- Highest attendance: 32,576; AEK Athens 2–2 PAOK (29 September 2019)
- Lowest attendance: 617; Volos 2–3 Atromitos (6 October 2019)
- Total attendance: 1,166,250
- All statistics correct as of 13 July 2020.

The 2019–20 Super League Greece was the 84th season of the Super League, the top Greek professional league for association football clubs, since its establishment in 1959.

The season marks the first year that the league that included a Play-off Round, whereby the top six teams at the conclusion of the regular season played each other exclusively to determine the league champion. The rest of the teams played each other in a Play-out Round to determine the relegation positions.

The season was suspended on 13 March 2020 due to the COVID-19 pandemic in Greece, then resumed on 5 June 2020.

During the championship, the multi-ownership scandal broke out between PAOK and Xanthi. The ESA (Professional Sports Committee) considered the case serious, which meant the automatic relegation of the two teams. The government brought an extraordinary amendment to the parliament under the pretext of splitting social cohesion. The amendment provided for the deduction of 5 to 10 points from those who violate the law on multi-ownership in Greek football by acquiring shares of another football club. On July 30, the HFF removed article 30 that referred to multi-ownership cases, an act which, as it turned out, was intended to cover the acquisition of Xanthi by PAOK.

Olympiacos won the championship for the 45th time. They also finished undefeated in the 26 games of the regular season of the league and remained undefeated in the first 7 games of the final phase of the playoffs, until losing the 8th game of the playoffs (0–1 to PAOK). They also achieved a record of the best defence in the regular season with just 9 goals conceded.

Xanthi were relegated to Super League 2 after play-off matches, while Panionios were relegated to the Gamma Ethniki, while the Super League 2 champion, PAS Giannina and play-off winner, Apollon Smyrnis were promoted.

== Multi-ownership PAOK - Xanthi ==
In December 2019, Olympiacos appealed to the Professional Sports Committee to clarify the relationship between PAOK and Xanthi after TV channel One (owned by Marinakis) reported that the Cypriot company RfA that had acquired Xanthi's assets (stadium and training center) appeared to be "linked" to Ivan Savvidis' nephew, Ioannis Kalpazidis. ^{a} The Professional Sports Committee accepted the evidence presented by Olympiacos and decided to recommend to the competent judicial body the revocation of both PAOK's and Xanthi's certificates of participation in the championship and, consequently, their exclusion from the championship. PCS referred the case to the sports judge and asked for the penalty of relegation.

The Deputy Sports Minister, Lefteris Avgenakis, commented negatively on the prospect of relegation.

The management of PAOK and their supporters were outraged by the decision, accusing Avgenakis of methodically setting up the committee, while protests and negative statements were also made by related individuals and organisations. For instance, former player and president of PAOK, Theodoros Zagorakis, who was MEP for ND at the time, was expelled from the parliamentary Eurogroup when he threatened to become independent if the decisions of the PCS were accepted.

The Greek government, afraid of a generalised reaction and as PAOK fans had started a series of protests, submitted an amendment on 6 February 2020 in order to prevent the sports judge's ruling. It changed the penalty for multiple ownership by abolishing relegation and imposing a deduction of 5 to 10 points. The amendment was passed with 156 votes in favour, while the parties the Movement for Change, KKE, Greek Solution and MeRA25 abstained from the vote in protest of the legislation, which was rushed through in order to serve certain interests.

The disciplinary committee of the HFF decided to punish PAOK and Xanthi by deducting 7 points from the former and 12 from the latter^{b}.

However, both Olympiacos and PAOK appealed to CAS against the decision of the HFF, with Olympiacos requesting the relegation of the latter and PAOK seeking their acquittal After both appeals, CAS decided that the 7 points should be returned to PAOK and referred the case back to the Appeals Committee of the HFF with the footnote that it should decide on the merits of the case without being bound by the conclusion of the CSP.

Eventually, on 9 February 2021, PAOK were fully acquitted by a decision of the Appeals Committee of the HFF. For Xanthi, however, there was no change in the decision, as the team did not appeal to the CAS.

== Teams ==
Fourteen teams competed in the league – the top twelve teams from the previous season, the previous season's play-off winner and one team promoted from the Football League. The promoted team was Volos. They replaced PAS Giannina, Levadiakos (both teams relegated after eight seasons in the league) and Apollon Smyrnis (relegated after two seasons in the top flight).

Promoted from 2018–19 Football League	Relegated from 2018–19 Super League Greece
Volos	PAS Giannina; Apollon Smyrnis; Levadiakos

=== Stadiums and locations ===
Locations of the 2019–20 Super League Greece teams

Note: Table lists in alphabetical order.

Team	Location	Stadium	Capacity	2018–19
AEK Athens	Athens (Marousi)	Athens Olympic Stadium	69,618	3rd
AEL	Larissa	AEL FC Arena	16,118	10th
Aris	Thessaloniki (Charilaou)	Kleanthis Vikelidis Stadium	22,800	5th
Asteras Tripolis	Tripoli	Theodoros Kolokotronis Stadium	7,442	11th
Atromitos	Athens (Peristeri)	Peristeri Stadium	10,050	4th
Lamia	Lamia	Lamia Municipal Stadium	5,500	7th
OFI	Heraklion	Theodoros Vardinogiannis Stadium	9,088	13th
Olympiacos	Piraeus	Karaiskakis Stadium	32,115	2nd
Panathinaikos	Athens (Ampelokipoi)	Leoforos Alexandras Stadium	16,003	8th
Panetolikos	Agrinio	Panetolikos Stadium	7,321	9th
Panionios	Athens (Nea Smyrni)	Nea Smyrni Stadium	11,700	6th
PAOK	Thessaloniki (Toumba)	Toumba Stadium	28,703	1st
Volos	Volos	Panthessaliko Stadium	22,700	1st (FL)
Xanthi	Xanthi	Xanthi FC Arena	7,244	12th

=== Personnel, kits and TV channel ===
Team	Manager	Captain	Kit manufacturer	Shirt sponsor	Broadcast Channel
AEK Athens	(Italy) Massimo Carrera	(Greece) Petros Mantalos	Capelli	Pame Stoixima	Nova Sports
AEL	(Greece) Michalis Grigoriou	(Greece) Vangelis Moras	Legea	Thrakis Gefseis	Nova Sports
Aris	(Germany) Michael Oenning	(Greece) Georgios Delizisis	Nike	betshop.gr	Nova Sports
Asteras Tripolis	(Serbia) Milan Rastavac	(Argentina) Walter Iglesias	Macron	Interwetten	Nova Sports
Atromitos	(Greece) Savvas Pantelidis	(Argentina) Javier Umbides	Nike	betshop.gr	ERT
Lamia	(Greece) Giorgos Petrakis	(Brazil) Vanderson	Macron	N/A	ERT
OFI	(Greece) Georgios Simos	(Greece) Anestis Nastos	Puma	Stoiximan.gr	Nova Sports
Olympiacos	(Portugal) Pedro Martins	(Greece) Andreas Bouchalakis	Adidas	Stoiximan.gr	Nova Sports
Panathinaikos	(Greece) Georgios Donis	(Greece) Dimitrios Kourbelis	Kappa	Pame Stoixima	Nova Sports
Panetolikos	(Greece) Makis Chavos	(Uruguay) Jorge Díaz	Givova	N/A	ERT
Panionios	(Greece) Leonidas Vokolos	(Greece) Panagiotis Korbos	Luanvi	Car.gr	Nova Sports
PAOK	(Portugal) Abel Ferreira	(Portugal) Vieirinha	Macron	Stoiximan.gr	PAOK TV
Volos	(Greece) Stefanos Xirofotos	(Greece) Stergios Dimopoulos	Luanvi	EBOL	Nova Sports
Xanthi	(Greece) Nikos Karageorgiou	(Greece) Dimos Baxevanidis	Joma	thefoodballer	ERT

=== Managerial changes ===
Team	Outgoing manager	Manner of departure	Date of vacancy	Position in table	Incoming manager	Date of appointment
Panetolikos	(Greece) Traianos Dellas	Resigned	19 April 2019	Pre-season	(Portugal) Luís Castro	30 May 2019
Atromitos	(Austria) Damir Canadi	End of contract	5 May 2019	Pre-season	(Greece) Giannis Anastasiou	24 May 2019
AEL	(Italy) Gianluca Festa	Resigned	7 May 2019	Pre-season	(Serbia) Gordan Petrić	12 May 2019
Asteras Tripolis	(Greece) Georgios Paraschos	Mutual consent	17 May 2019	Pre-season	(Spain) Borja Jiménez	7 July 2019
Xanthi	(Serbia) Milan Rastavac	Mutual consent	18 May 2019	Pre-season	(Spain) Kiko Ramírez	20 May 2019
AEK Athens	(Spain) Manolo Jiménez	Mutual consent	27 May 2019	Pre-season	(Portugal) Miguel Cardoso	28 May 2019
PAOK	(Romania) Răzvan Lucescu	Resigned	28 June 2019	Pre-season	(Portugal) Abel Ferreira	1 July 2019
OFI	(Chile) Jaime Vera	Mutual consent	29 June 2019	Pre-season	(Greece) Georgios Simos	12 July 2019
Lamia	(Greece) Makis Chavos	Mutual consent	4 August 2019	Pre-season	(Greece) Sotiris Antoniou	6 August 2019
AEL	(Serbia) Gordan Petrić	Mutual consent	8 August 2019	Pre-season	(Greece) Michalis Grigoriou	8 August 2019
AEK Athens	(Portugal) Miguel Cardoso	Sacked	25 August 2019	11th	(Greece) Nikos Kostenoglou	26 August 2019
Aris	(Greece) Savvas Pantelidis	Resigned	31 August 2019	9th	(Greece) Apostolos Terzis (caretaker)	10 September 2019
Panionios	(Greece) Akis Mantzios	Mutual consent	2 September 2019	14th	(Cyprus) Nikki Papavasiliou	3 September 2019
Aris	(Greece) Apostolos Terzis (caretaker)	End of tenure as caretaker	8 October 2019	9th	(Germany) Michael Oenning	12 October 2019
Panetolikos	(Portugal) Luís Castro	Sacked	14 October 2019	13th	(Greece) Makis Chavos	15 October 2019
Lamia	(Greece) Sotiris Antoniou	Sacked	24 October 2019	12th	(Greece) Akis Mantzios	25 October 2019
Atromitos	(Greece) Giannis Anastasiou	Sacked	16 November 2019	10th	(Greece) Georgios Korakakis (caretaker)	18 November 2019
Xanthi	(Spain) Kiko Ramírez	Sacked	25 November 2019	6th	(Greece) Tasos Sideridis (caretaker)	26 November 2019
Asteras Tripolis	(Spain) Borja Jiménez	Sacked	4 December 2019	12th	(Serbia) Milan Rastavac	5 December 2019
Atromitos	(Greece) Georgios Korakakis (caretaker)	End of tenure as caretaker	5 December 2019	9th	(Greece) Savvas Pantelidis	5 December 2019
Xanthi	(Greece) Tasos Sideridis (caretaker)	End of tenure as caretaker	7 December 2019	4th	(Greece) Georgios Paraschos	8 December 2019
AEK Athens	(Greece) Nikos Kostenoglou	Mutual consent	8 December 2019	3rd	(Italy) Massimo Carrera	8 December 2019
Volos	(Spain) Juan Ferrando	Resigned	2 January 2020	11th	(Spain) Alberto Gallego	5 January 2020
Panionios	(Cyprus) Nikki Papavasiliou	Resigned	19 February 2020	14th	(Greece) Dimitris Koropoulis (caretaker)	20 February 2020
Panionios	(Greece) Dimitris Koropoulis (caretaker)	End of tenure as caretaker	25 February 2020	14th	(Greece) Leonidas Vokolos	26 February 2020
Volos	(Spain) Alberto Gallego	Sacked	25 February 2020	12th	(Greece) Stefanos Xirofotos	26 February 2020
Xanthi	(Greece) Georgios Paraschos	Sacked	6 March 2020	9th	(Greece) Nikos Karageorgiou	7 March 2020
Lamia	(Greece) Akis Mantzios	Sacked	25 June 2020	10th	(Greece) Giorgos Petrakis	25 June 2020

== Regular season ==
=== League table ===
Pos	Team	Pld	W	D	L	GF	GA	GD	Pts	Qualification
1	Olympiacos	26	20	6	0	53	9	+44	66	Qualification for the Play-off round
2	PAOK	26	18	5	3	50	23	+27	59	Qualification for the Play-off round
3	AEK Athens	26	15	6	5	42	22	+20	51	Qualification for the Play-off round
4	Panathinaikos	26	12	8	6	35	23	+12	44	Qualification for the Play-off round
5	OFI	26	10	4	12	35	35	0	34 (Note: Head-to-head points: OFI 4, Aris 1.)	Qualification for the Play-off round
6	Aris	26	8	10	8	38	32	+6	34	Qualification for the Play-off round
7	Atromitos	26	9	5	12	31	36	−5	32	Qualification for the Play-out round
8	AEL	26	7	9	10	28	33	−5	30 (Note: Head-to-head points: AEL 4, Asteras Tripolis 1.)	Qualification for the Play-out round
9	Asteras Tripolis	26	8	6	12	33	37	−4	30	Qualification for the Play-out round
10	Lamia	26	5	12	9	19	33	−14	27 (Note: Head-to-head points: Lamia 3, Volos 3.)	Qualification for the Play-out round
11	Volos	26	7	6	13	23	42	−19	27	Qualification for the Play-out round
12	Xanthi (Note: Xanthi were deducted 12 points for joint ownership.)	26	8	6	12	21	32	−11	18	Qualification for the Play-out round
13	Panetolikos	26	3	8	15	20	42	−22	17	Qualification for the Play-out round
14	Panionios (Note: Panionios were deducted 6 points for non-licensing.)	26	4	5	17	16	45	−29	11	Qualification for the Play-out round

Source: Super League Greece
Rules for classification: 1) Points; 2) Head-to-head points; 3) Head-to-head goal difference; 4) Goal difference; 5) Goals scored; 6) Play-offs (neutral ground).
(Note: Criteria 6 is only used if needed to decide champion, teams for relegation or teams for UEFA competitions).

=== Results ===
Home \ Away	AEK	AEL	ARIS	AST	ATR	LAM	OFI	OLY	PAO	PNE	PGSS	PAOK	VOL	XAN
AEK Athens	—	3–0	1–1	2–1	3–2	2–0	3–0	0–0	1–0	3–1	5–0	2–2	3–2	1–2
AEL	0–0	—	0–0	3–0	1–2	0–3	3–2	0–1	0–2	2–2	2–0	1–2	2–1	3–0
Aris	0–1	2–3	—	2–1	1–2	1–1	1–1	1–2	4–0	2–0	2–0	4–2	4–0	1–0
Asteras Tripolis	2–3	1–1	1–1	—	2–1	4–1	2–0	0–5	1–1	2–1	2–0	1–2	0–0	5–0
Atromitos	0–1	1–1	2–2	2–1	—	1–1	2–1	0–1	0–1	2–0	4–0	2–3	0–0	1–0
Lamia	0–0	0–0	2–2	1–1	2–2	—	2–1	0–4	1–1	0–0	1–1	0–1	1–0	1–0
OFI	1–0	0–0	3–1	3–1	1–0	3–0	—	0–1	1–1	3–1	4–1	0–1	1–2	2–0
Olympiacos	2–0	4–1	4–2	1–0	2–0	2–0	2–1	—	1–0	2–0	4–0	1–1	5–0	3–1
Panathinaikos	3–2	1–2	0–0	1–0	3–0	2–0	1–3	1–1	—	3–1	3–0	2–0	4–1	0–1
Panetolikos	0–1	2–2	2–0	1–1	0–1	1–1	2–0	0–3	0–0	—	1–0	0–3	1–1	1–2
Panionios	1–1	1–0	1–1	0–1	1–0	0–1	1–2	1–1	0–1	3–0	—	0–2	1–2	0–0
PAOK	1–0	1–0	2–2	3–1	5–1	3–0	4–0	0–1	2–2	2–1	2–1	—	1–0	2–0
Volos	1–3	0–0	1–0	0–1	2–3	1–0	1–0	0–0	1–1	3–2	2–1	0–2	—	1–3
Xanthi	0–1	2–1	0–1	2–1	1–0	0–0	2–2	0–0	0–1	0–0	1–2	1–1	3–1	—

Source: Super League Greece
Legend: Blue = home team win; Yellow = draw; Red = away team win.

=== Positions by round ===
The table lists the positions of teams after each week of matches. To preserve chronological evolvements, any postponed matches are not included in the round at which they were originally scheduled, but added to the full round they were played immediately afterwards.

Team ╲ Round	1	2	3	4	5	6	7	8	9	10	11	12	13	14	15	16	17	18	19	20	21	22	23	24	25	26
Olympiacos	4	4	1	1	1	1	1	1	1	1	1	1	1	1	1	2	1	1	1	1	2	1	1	1	1	1
PAOK	1	1	2	2	3	3	2	2	2	2	2	2	2	2	2	1	2	2	2	2	1	2	2	2	2	2
AEK Athens	11	6	5	4	5	5	4	5	3	3	3	5	3	3	3	3	3	3	3	3	3	3	3	3	3	3
Panathinaikos	5	11	11	12	10	10	9	11	10	8	10	8	9	5	6	7	7	6	4	4	4	4	4	4	4	4
OFI	5	5	4	6	4	4	5	3	4	4	4	3	5	4	4	4	5	9	5	6	6	6	6	6	6	5
Aris	5	9	7	7	8	9	8	8	7	7	5	7	7	8	5	6	4	4	6	5	5	5	5	5	5	6
Atromitos	5	7	8	11	9	8	10	7	8	10	8	9	10	9	8	9	8	7	7	7	8	8	8	9	8	7
AEL	5	9	10	8	7	7	6	6	6	6	7	6	4	6	9	5	10	8	10	9	10	9	10	11	11	8
Asteras Tripolis	13	12	12	9	11	12	11	9	9	11	12	12	12	12	12	12	12	12	12	12	11	10	9	7	7	9
Lamia	5	7	9	10	12	11	12	12	12	12	9	10	8	10	10	10	9	10	9	10	9	12	12	10	10	10
Volos	3	3	6	5	6	6	7	10	11	9	11	11	11	11	11	11	11	11	11	11	12	11	11	12	12	11
Xanthi	2	2	3	3	2	2	3	4	5	5	6	4	6	7	7	8	6	5	8	8	7	7	7	8	7	12
Panetolikos	11	12	13	13	13	13	13	13	13	13	13	14	14	14	14	13	13	13	13	13	13	13	13	13	13	13
Panionios	14	14	14	14	14	14	14	14	14	14	14	13	13	13	13	14	14	14	14	14	14	14	14	14	14	14

Leader and Qualification for the Play-off round
Qualification for the Play-off round
Qualification for the Play-out round

Source: Super League Greece

== Play-off round ==
The top six teams from Regular season will meet twice (10 matches per team) for places in 2020–21 UEFA Champions League and 2020–21 UEFA Europa League as well as deciding the league champion.

Pos	Team	Pld	W	D	L	GF	GA	GD	Pts	Qualification	OLY	PAOK	AEK	PAO	ARIS	OFI
1	Olympiacos (C)	36	28	7	1	74	16	+58	91	Qualification for the Champions League play-off round	—	0–1	3–0	3–0	3–1	2–1
2	PAOK	36	21	10	5	58	29	+29	73	Qualification for the Champions League second qualifying round	0–1	—	0–2	0–0	0–0	3–1
3	AEK Athens	36	20	9	7	59	32	+27	69	Qualification for the Europa League third qualifying round	1–2	0–0	—	1–1	2–2	2–0
4	Panathinaikos (Note: Panathinaikos were banned from UEFA club competitions for the first season they would qualify between the 2018–19 and 2020–21 seasons by the UEFA Club Financial Control Body on 24 April 2018 due to overdue payables, and since they did not qualify for either the 2018–19 or 2019–20 season, they were banned from the 2020–21 season.)	36	15	13	8	43	32	+11	58		0–0	0–0	1–3	—	2–0	3–2
5	Aris	36	10	12	14	48	51	−3	42	Qualification for the Europa League second qualifying round	2–4	0–2	1–4	0–1	—	3–1
6	OFI	36	10	6	20	43	56	−13	36	Qualification for the Europa League second qualifying round	1–3	2–2	0–2	0–0	0–1	—

Source: Super League Greece
Legend: Blue = home team win; Yellow = draw; Red = away team win.
Rules for classification: 1) Points; 2) Head-to-head points; 3) Head-to-head goal difference; 4) Goals scored; 5) Goals against; 6) Play-offs (neutral ground); 7) Draw.
(Note: Criteria 6 is only used if needed to decide champion, teams for relegation or teams for UEFA competitions).
(C) Champions

=== Play-off round positions by round ===
Team ╲ Round	27	28	29	30	31	32	33	34	35	36
Olympiacos	1	1	1	1	1	1	1	1	1	1
PAOK	2	2	2	2	3	2	2	2	2	2
AEK Athens	3	3	3	3	2	3	3	3	3	3
Panathinaikos	4	4	4	4	4	4	4	4	4	4
Aris	5	5	5	5	5	5	5	5	5	5
OFI	6	6	6	6	6	6	6	6	6	6

Champion and Champions League play off round
Champions League second qualifying round
Europa League third qualifying round
Europa League second qualifying round

Source: Super League Greece

== Play-out round ==
Pos	Team	Pld	W	D	L	GF	GA	GD	Pts	Qualification or relegation	AST	ATR	AEL	LAM	VOL	PNE	XAN	PGSS
7	Asteras Tripolis	33	11	10	12	44	42	+2	43		—	1–1	—	1–1	4–0	—	—	0–0
8	Atromitos	33	11	9	13	41	43	−2	42		—	—	3–0	1–1	—	2–2	—	0–0
9	AEL	33	8	12	13	32	42	−10	36		1–2	—	—	—	3–1	—	0–0	0–0
10	Lamia	33	6	17	10	23	36	−13	35		—	—	0–0	—	—	2–0	0–0	0–1
11	Volos	33	8	7	18	27	54	−27	31		—	2–3	—	0–0	—	—	1–0	—
12	Panetolikos	33	6	11	16	30	48	−18	29		1–1	—	3–0	—	1–0	—	—	—
13	Xanthi (Note: Xanthi was punished with -7 points for the case of co-ownership and -5 points for not announcing the change in the shareholder structure of football club by the Primary Single Member Disciplinary body of the organization.) (R)	33	9	9	15	25	38	−13	24	Qualification for the relegation play-offs	1–2	1–0	—	—	—	1–1	—	—
14	Panionios (Note: Panionios were deducted 6 points for non-licensing.) (R)	33	7	8	18	20	48	−28	23	Relegation to Gamma Ethniki	—	—	—	—	1–0	0–2	2–1	—

Source: Super League Greece
Legend: Blue = home team win; Yellow = draw; Red = away team win.
Rules for classification: 1) Points; 2) Head-to-head points; 3) Head-to-head goal difference; 4) Goals scored; 5) Goals against; 6) Play-offs (neutral ground); 7) Draw.
(Note: Criteria 6 is only used if needed to decide champion, teams for relegation or teams for UEFA competitions).
(R) Relegated

=== Play-out round positions by round ===
Team ╲ Round	27	28	29	30	31	32	33
Asteras Tripolis	7	7	7	8	7	7	7
Atromitos	8	8	8	7	8	8	8
AEL	10	10	9	9	9	9	9
Lamia	9	9	10	10	10	10	10
Volos	11	11	11	11	11	11	11
Panetolikos	13	13	13	13	13	12	12
Xanthi	12	12	12	12	12	13	13
Panionios	14	14	14	14	14	14	14

Qualification for the relegation play-offs
Relegation to 2020–21 Super League Greece 2

Source: Super League Greece

== Relegation play-offs ==
Summary
Team 1	Agg.	Team 2	1st leg	2nd leg
Xanthi	1–4	Apollon Smyrnis	0–1	1–3

26 August 2020
20:00 EEST

Xanthi	0–1	Apollon Smyrnis
	Report	Thomás 67' (pen.)

Xanthi FC Arena, Xanthi
Attendance: Behind closed doors
Referee: Anastasios Papapetrou (Athens)
29 August 2020
20:00 EEST

Apollon Smyrnis	3–1	Xanthi
Thomás 14' (pen.), 57'; Tenekes 36' (o.g.)	Report	Thymianis 84' (pen.)

Georgios Kamaras Stadium, Rizoupoli
Attendance: Behind closed doors
Referee: Anastasios Sidiropoulos (Dodecanese)

Apollon Smyrnis won 4–1 on aggregate and were promoted to 2020–21 Super League. Xanthi were relegated to 2020–21 Super League 2.

== Season statistics ==
=== Top scorers ===
As of 19 July 2020

Rank	Player	Club	Goals
1	(Morocco) Youssef El-Arabi	Olympiacos	20
2	(Portugal) Nélson Oliveira	AEK Athens	14
2	(Greece) Giorgos Manousos	Atromitos	14
2	(Italy) Federico Macheda	Panathinaikos	14
3	(Portugal) Bruno Gama	Aris	12
4	(Poland) Karol Świderski	PAOK	11
4	(Argentina) Jerónimo Barrales	Asteras Tripolis	11
4	(Brazil) João Figueiredo	OFI	11
5	(Spain) Luis Fernández	Asteras Tripolis	10
6	(Croatia) Marko Livaja	AEK Athens	9
6	(Serbia) Radomir Milosavljević	AEL	9
6	(Greece) Georgios Masouras	Olympiacos	9

=== Top assists ===
As of 19 July 2020

Rank	Player	Club	Assists
1	(France) Mathieu Valbuena	Olympiacos	13
2	(Greece) Petros Mantalos	AEK Athens	12
3	(Greece) Giannis Fetfatzidis	Aris	9
4	(Croatia) Josip Mišić	PAOK	8
4	(Croatia) Marko Livaja	AEK Athens	8
4	(Morocco) Youssef El-Arabi	Olympiacos	8
5	(Greece) Kosmas Tsilianidis	OFI	7
5	(Brazil) Farley Rosa	Panetolikos	7
5	(Spain) Adrián Riera	Asteras Tripolis	7
5	(Greece) Dimitrios Limnios	PAOK	7

== Awards ==
=== NIVEA MEN Player of the Month ===
Month	Player	Club	Ref
August	(Portugal) Nélson Oliveira	AEK Athens	
September	(France) Mathieu Valbuena	Olympiacos	
October	(Algeria) Hillal Soudani	Olympiacos	
November	(Sweden) Daniel Larsson	Aris	
December	(Portugal) Nélson Oliveira	AEK Athens	
January	(Morocco) Youssef El-Arabi	Olympiacos	
February	(Serbia) Nenad Krstičić	AEK Athens	
June	(Croatia) Marko Livaja	AEK Athens	
July	(Egypt) Ahmed Hassan	Olympiacos	

=== NIVEA MEN Player of the Club ===
Club	MVP	Ref
Olympiacos	(Morocco) Youssef El-Arabi	
PAOK	(Croatia) Josip Mišić	
AEK Athens	(Croatia) Marko Livaja	
Panathinaikos	(Greece) Anastasios Chatzigiovanis	
OFI	(Brazil) João Figueiredo	
Aris	(Greece) Giannis Fetfatzidis	
Atromitos	(Greece) Giorgos Manousos	
AEL	(Iceland) Ögmundur Kristinsson	
Asteras Tripolis	(Argentina) Jerónimo Barrales	
Lamia	(Bolivia) Danny Bejarano	
Volos	(Greece) Antonis Dentakis	
Xanthi	(Spain) Carlos Abad	
Panetolikos	(Brazil) Farley Rosa	
Panionios	(Georgia (country)) Bachana Arabuli	

=== NIVEA MEN Player of the Regular season ===
Player	Club	Votes	Ref
(Croatia) Marko Livaja	AEK Athens	27.54%	

=== NIVEA MEN Best Goal of the Regular season ===
Player	Club	Match	Votes	Ref
(Greece) Apostolos Vellios	Atromitos	vs Lamia 2–2 (Matchday 2)	35.96%	

=== NIVEA MEN Best Goal ===
Matchday	Player	Club	Ref
Regular Season
1st	(Brazil) Lucas Sasha	Aris	
2nd	(Greece) Apostolos Vellios	Atromitos	
3rd	(Bosnia and Herzegovina) Ognjen Vranješ	AEK Athens	
4th	(Spain) Miguel Ángel Guerrero	Olympiacos	
5th	(Norway) Ghayas Zahid	Panathinaikos	
6th	(Greece) Georgios Masouras	Olympiacos	
7th	(Poland) Karol Świderski	PAOK	
8th	(Greece) Christos Tasoulis	Asteras Tripolis	
9th	(Mauritius) Lindsay Rose	Aris	
10th	(Croatia) Josip Mišić	PAOK	
11th	(Greece) Giorgos Manousos	Atromitos	
12th	(Brazil) Thuram	Lamia	
13th	(Italy) Daniele Verde	AEK Athens	
14th	(Greece) Georgios Masouras	Olympiacos	
15th	(Nigeria) Brown Ideye	Aris	
16th	(Spain) Sito	Asteras Tripolis	
17th	(Morocco) Youssef El-Arabi	Olympiacos	
18th	(Greece) Christos Donis	Panathinaikos	
19th	(Portugal) André Simões	AEK Athens	
20th	(Nigeria) Abiola Dauda	Panetolikos	
21st	(Brazil) Farley Rosa	Panetolikos	
22nd	(Portugal) Bruno Gama	Aris	
23rd	(Argentina) Sergio Araujo	AEK Athens	
24th	(Greece) Kostas Fortounis	Olympiacos	
25th	(Italy) Daniele Verde	AEK Athens	
26th	(Brazil) Rodrigo Galo	Atromitos	
Play-offs/Play-outs
1st	(Morocco) Youssef El-Arabi	Olympiacos	
2nd	(France) Anthony Mounier	Panetolikos	
3rd	(Morocco) Youssef El-Arabi	Olympiacos	
4th/5th	(Morocco) Youssef El-Arabi	Olympiacos	
6th/7th	(Greece) Petros Bagalianis	Aris	
8th/9th	(Greece) Kostas Fortounis	Olympiacos	
10th	(Serbia) Lazar Ranđelović	Olympiacos	

=== Annual awards ===
Annual awards were announced on 16 February 2021.

Award	Winner	Club
Greek Player of the Season	(Greece) Kostas Tsimikas	Olympiacos
Foreign Player of the Season	(Morocco) Youssef El-Arabi	Olympiacos
Young Player of the Season	(Greece) Dimitrios Emmanouilidis	Panionios
Goalkeeper of the Season	(Portugal) Jose Sa	Olympiacos
Golden Boot	(Morocco) Youssef El-Arabi	Olympiacos
Manager of the Season	(Portugal) Pedro Martins	Olympiacos

Team of the Season
Goalkeeper	(Portugal) Jose Sa (Olympiacos)			
Defence	(Norway) Omar Elabdellaoui (Olympiacos)	(Greece) Spyros Risvanis (Atromitos)	(Portugal) Rúben Semedo (Olympiacos)	(Greece) Kostas Tsimikas (Olympiacos)
Midfield	(Greece) Giannis Fetfatzidis (Aris)	(Greece) Dimitrios Kourbelis (Panathinaikos)	(Croatia) Josip Mišić (PAOK)	(France) Mathieu Valbuena (Olympiacos)
Attack	(Croatia) Marko Livaja (AEK Athens)		(Morocco) Youssef El-Arabi (Olympiacos)	

== Attendances ==
=== Overall ===
Olympiacos drew the highest average home attendance in the 2019–20 edition of the Super League.

Pos	Team	Total	High	Low	Average	Change
1	Olympiacos (18)	266,511	31,616	18,921	24,228	+15.0%^{2}
2	PAOK (18)	239,523	26,377	11,995	18,425	−1.1%
3	AEK Athens (18)	189,694	32,576	9,302	15,808	+64.3%^{5}
4	Aris (18)	133,441	16,249	5,945	10,265	+15.1%
5	Panathinaikos (18)	74,003	19,133	2,053	5,693	−32.3%
6	OFI (18)	58,193	5,807	3,326	4,476	+22.4%
7	AEL (17)	42,234	4,404	1,938	3,249	+29.9%
8	Panetolikos (16)	28,107	3,537	1,647	2,342	−1.7%^{3}
9	Volos (16)	27,052	4,566	617	2,081	n/a^{1}
10	Asteras Tripolis (17)	26,945	4,933	859	2,073	+2.1%
11	Lamia (17)	24,208	3,832	715	1,862	−1.2%
12	Xanthi (16)	22,434	3,315	888	1,726	+15.8%
13	Panionios (16)	17,886	3,054	746	1,626	−4.3%^{4}
14	Atromitos (17)	16,016	2,053	733	1,232	+56.9%
	League total	1,166,250	32,576	617	6,626	+22.0%

Updated to games played on 1 March 2020
Source: slgr.gr
Notes:
1: Team played last season in the Football League
2: Games played behind closed doors Olympiacos 2 games.
3: Games played behind closed doors Panetolikos 1 game.
4: Games played behind closed doors Panionios 2 games.
5: Games played behind closed doors AEK Athens 1 game.

^a According to the complaint, Ioannis Kalpazidis, the representative of the Cypriot company RfA, which bought the assets of Xanthis FC, is allegedly the nephew of Ivan Savvidis. The complainant added that this person, who worked as a waiter, paid 10 million euros for this purchase. Olympiacos also complained that members of the board of directors of FC Xanthi were also on the board of directors of the RfA.

^b XANTHI FC was imposed an additional deduction of 5 points for non-updated share register.

=== Home matches played ===
Team \ Match played	Regular season													Play-off & play-out					Total
Team \ Match played	1	2	3	4	5	6	7	8	9	10	11	12	13	1	2	3	4	5	Total
AEK Athens	10,238	17,093	32,576	15,129	13,087	12,126	12,124	10,325	23,741	20,374	3,516	—	9,365	—	—	—	—	—	189,694 (12)
AEL	3,883	4,404	2,842	4,049	3,983	3,452	2,569	2,070	3,307	3,120	2,250	1,938	4,367	—	—	—	—	—	42,234 (13)
Aris	12,306	13,129	12,134	13,143	9,972	9,012	16,249	5,945	7,945	11,324	6,240	9,393	6,649	—	—	—	—	—	133,441 (13)
Asteras Tripolis	3,825	1,622	3,068	959	1,304	4,933	1,139	1,229	956	2,210	1,319	2,863	1,518	—	—	—	—	—	26,945 (13)
Atromitos	972	2,053	1,206	1,039	1,275	1,491	929	836	1,615	1,369	733	1,232	1,266	—	—	—	—	—	16,016 (13)
Lamia	2,612	1,465	1,423	1,119	1,734	2,312	3,832	3,061	2,072	1,032	1,197	1,634	715	—	—	—	—	—	24,208 (13)
OFI	3,463	3,326	3,832	5,529	5,807	5,311	3,511	4,736	3,818	5,685	4,012	4,013	5,150	—	—	—	—	—	58,193 (13)
Olympiacos	18,921	22,532	21,123	25,121	31,616	22,532	25,622	24,521	21,231	—	—	31,157	22,135	—	—	—	—	—	266,511 (11)
Panathinaikos	5,039	6,700	4,566	11,056	4,780	5,373	3,172	3,876	19,133	3,516	2,125	5,013	3,654	—	—	—	—	—	74,003 (13)
Panetolikos	2,118	3,537	1,946	1,647	2,218	2,805	2,127	2,217	2,283	2,281	2,437	2,283	2,208	—	—	—	—	—	28,107 (12)
Panionios	1,512	1,534	2,756	1,522	3,054	1,787	746	957	990	—	1,557	2,052	1,422	—	—	—	—	—	17,889 (11)
PAOK	17,968	15,793	23,926	19,013	22,466	17,398	15,007	17,809	21,332	15,168	26,377	11,995	15,271	—	—	—	—	—	239,523 (13)
Volos	1,677	750	617	4,566	3,294	2,260	1,570	2,372	2,773	1,658	1,680	1,274	2,561	—	—	—	—	—	27,052 (13)
Xanthi	3,315	1,406	1,365	1,579	1,519	1,422	2,821	888	1,024	2,699	1,248	1,340	1,808	—	—	—	—	—	22,434 (13)
League total																			1,166,250

Source: Super League Greece
