= Lanco =

Lanco may refer to:

- Lanco, Chile, a city and commune
- Lanco (band), an American country music band
- Lanco, the stage name of Alberto Gallego, a Spanish musician and football manager
- Lanco Infratech, an Indian business conglomerate
- LATAM Cargo Colombia, a Colombian cargo airline formerly known as LANCO
- Langendorf Watch Company SA, a Swiss watchmaker with the brand Lanco
