= 2022–23 La Liga =

92nd season of La Liga

La Liga
- Season: 2022–23
- Dates: 12 August 2022 – 4 June 2023
- Champions: Barcelona; 27th title
- Relegated: Valladolid; Espanyol; Elche
- Champions League: Barcelona; Real Madrid; Atlético Madrid; Real Sociedad; Sevilla (as Europa League winners)
- Europa League: Villarreal; Real Betis
- Europa Conference League: Osasuna
- Matches: 380
- Goals: 955 (2.51 per match)
- Best player: Marc-André ter Stegen
- Top goalscorer: Robert Lewandowski (23 goals)
- Best goalkeeper: Marc-André ter Stegen (0.49 goals/match)
- Biggest home win: Real Madrid 6–0 Valladolid (2 April 2023)
- Biggest away win: Cádiz 0–4 Athletic Bilbao (29 August 2022); Cádiz 0–4 Barcelona (10 September 2022); Elche 0–4 Barcelona (1 April 2023)
- Highest scoring: Girona 3–5 Real Sociedad (3 October 2022); Girona 6–2 Almería (17 February 2023)
- Longest winning run: Barcelona (7 matches) (twice)
- Longest unbeaten run: Atlético Madrid; Barcelona (13 matches)
- Longest winless run: Elche (19 matches)
- Longest losing run: Elche; Espanyol (6 matches)
- Highest attendance: 95,745; Barcelona 2–1 Real Madrid (19 March 2023)
- Lowest attendance: 8,879; Girona 6–2 Almería (17 February 2023)
- Attendance: 11,236,873 (29,571 per match)

The 2022–23 La Liga, also known as La Liga Santander due to sponsorship reasons, was the 92nd season of La Liga, Spain's premier football competition. It commenced on 12 August 2022 and concluded on 4 June 2023. Real Madrid were the defending champions, having won their 35th title the previous season.

On 14 May, Barcelona were confirmed as champions with four matches to spare following a 4–2 away victory against Espanyol, clinching the club's 27th league title and first since the 2018–19 season.

With the 2022 FIFA World Cup having commenced on 20 November, there was a mid-season hiatus in the league. The last round before the break was held from 8–10 November, with the league resuming on 29 December. This season was the first since 2012–13 to conclude in June.

== Teams ==
=== Promotion and relegation (pre-season) ===
A total of twenty teams contested the league, including seventeen sides from the 2021–22 season and three promoted from the 2021–22 Segunda División. This included the two top teams from the Segunda División, and the winners of the promotion play-offs.

Teams relegated to Segunda División

The first team to be relegated from La Liga were Levante, after a 6–0 loss to Real Madrid on 12 May 2022, ending their five-year stay in the top tier. The second team to be relegated was Alavés, after a defeat of 1–3 by Levante on 15 May 2022, ending their six-year stay in the top tier. The third and final team relegated to Segunda was Granada, who drew against Espanyol, which was coupled with wins of Cádiz and Mallorca on 22 May 2022, the final match day. Granada ended a three-year stay in the top level.

Teams promoted from Segunda División

The first two teams to earn promotion from Segunda División were Almería and Real Valladolid, who mathematically secured first and second positions, respectively, on the very last match day of the season. Almería returned to La Liga after a seven-year absence, while Valladolid came back after one year. The third and final team to be promoted were Girona after winning the play-off final 3–1 against Tenerife, returning after a three-year absence.

Promoted from 2021–22 Segunda División	Relegated from 2021–22 La Liga
Almería; Valladolid; Girona	Granada; Levante; Alavés

=== Stadiums and locations ===
Location of teams in 2022–23 La Liga
Location of Community of Madrid teams in 2022–23 La Liga

Team	Location	Stadium	Capacity
Almería	Almería	Power Horse Stadium	15,000
Athletic Bilbao	Bilbao	San Mamés	53,289
Atlético Madrid	Madrid	Cívitas Metropolitano	68,456
Barcelona	Barcelona	Spotify Camp Nou	99,354
Cádiz	Cádiz	Nuevo Mirandilla	20,724
Celta Vigo	Vigo	Abanca-Balaídos	29,000
Elche	Elche	Martínez Valero	31,388
Espanyol	Cornellà de Llobregat	RCDE Stadium	40,000
Getafe	Getafe	Coliseum Alfonso Pérez	16,500
Girona	Girona	Montilivi	13,400
Mallorca	Palma	Son Moix	23,142
Osasuna	Pamplona	El Sadar	23,576
Rayo Vallecano	Madrid	Vallecas	14,708
Real Betis	Seville	Benito Villamarín	60,721
Real Madrid	Madrid	Santiago Bernabéu	65,000
Real Sociedad	San Sebastián	Reale Arena	39,500
Sevilla	Seville	Ramón Sánchez Pizjuán	43,883
Valencia	Valencia	Mestalla	49,430
Valladolid	Valladolid	José Zorrilla	28,012
Villarreal	Villarreal	Estadio de la Cerámica	23,008

=== Personnel and sponsorship ===
Team	Manager	Captain	Kit manufacturer	Main kit sponsor	Other kit sponsor(s)
Almería	(Spain) Rubi	(Spain) César de la Hoz	Castore	Khaled Juffali Company	Power Horse^{1}, Durrat Al Arous^{2}, Kudu Restaurants^{3}, TCI GECOMP^{3}
Athletic Bilbao	(Spain) Ernesto Valverde	(Spain) Iker Muniain	New Balance	Kutxabank	Digi Communications^{1}, B2BinPay^{2}
Atlético Madrid	(Argentina) Diego Simeone	(Spain) Koke	Nike	WhaleFin	Ria Money Transfer^{1}, Hyundai^{2}
Barcelona	(Spain) Xavi	(Spain) Sergio Busquets	Nike	Spotify	UNHCR^{1}, Ambilight TV^{2}
Cádiz	(Spain) Sergio	(Spain) José Mari	Macron	Digi Communications	Humanox^{2}, Motoreto^{2}, Wehumans^{2}^{3}
Celta Vigo	(Portugal) Carlos Carvalhal	(Spain) Hugo Mallo	Adidas	Estrella Galicia 0,0	Abanca^{1}, AIX Investment Group^{2}, Grupo Recalvi^{3}
Elche	(Argentina) Sebastián Beccacece	(Spain) Gonzalo Verdú	Nike	TM Real Estate Group	Sfidante^{2}
Espanyol	(Spain) Luis García	(Spain) Sergi Darder	Kelme	Riviera Maya	Digi Communications^{1}, Reale Seguros^{2}, Crypto SNACK^{3}
Getafe	(Spain) José Bordalás	(Togo) Djené	Joma	Tecnocasa Group	Motoreto^{3}
Girona	(Spain) Míchel	(Uruguay) Cristhian Stuani	Puma	Gosbi	Open Arms^{2}, Costa Brava^{3}, Parlem^{3}
Mallorca	(Mexico) Javier Aguirre	(Spain) Antonio Raíllo	Nike	αGEL	Alua Hotels & Resorts^{1}, Juaneda^{1}, OK Mobility^{2}, Air Europa^{3}, Specialized^{3}
Osasuna	(Spain) Jagoba Arrasate	(Spain) David García	Adidas	Verleal	HR Motor^{1}, Clínica Universidad de Navarra^{3}
Rayo Vallecano	(Spain) Andoni Iraola	(Argentina) Óscar Trejo	Umbro	Digi Communications	Los Sueños Development Group^{1}
Real Betis	(Chile) Manuel Pellegrini	(Spain) Joaquín	Hummel	Finetwork	LegacyFX^{1}, Reale Seguros^{2}, MuchBetter^{3}
Real Madrid	(Italy) Carlo Ancelotti	(France) Karim Benzema	Adidas	Emirates	None
Real Sociedad	(Spain) Imanol Alguacil	(Spain) Asier Illarramendi	Macron	Cazoo	Kutxabank^{1}, Reale Seguros^{2}, Finetwork^{3}
Sevilla	(Uruguay) Diego Alonso	(Spain) Jesús Navas	Castore	DEGIRO	Andex^{1}, Valvoline^{2}
Valencia	(Spain) Rubén Baraja	(Spain) José Gayà	Puma	Cazoo	Herrero Brigantina^{1}, Sailun Tyres^{2}, Škoda^{3}
Valladolid	(Uruguay) Paulo Pezzolano	(Spain) Jordi Masip	Adidas	Estrella Galicia 0,0	Herbalife Nutrition^{1}, JD Sports^{2}, INEXO^{3}
Villarreal	(Spain) Quique Setién	(Spain) Raúl Albiol	Joma	Pamesa Cerámica	Zoomex^{1}, Color Star Technology^{2}

1. On the back of shirt.
2. On the sleeves.
3. On the shorts.

=== Managerial changes ===
Team	Outgoing manager	Manner of departure	Date of vacancy	Position in table	Incoming manager	Date of appointment
Espanyol	(Spain) Luis Blanco	End of caretaker spell	13 May 2022	Pre-season	(Spain) Diego Martínez	31 May 2022
Valencia	(Spain) José Bordalás	Sacked	22 May 2022	Pre-season	(Italy) Gennaro Gattuso	9 June 2022
Athletic Bilbao	(Spain) Marcelino	Resigned	24 May 2022	Pre-season	(Spain) Ernesto Valverde	30 June 2022
Elche	(Spain) Francisco	Sacked	4 October 2022	20th	(Spain) Alberto Gallego (caretaker)	7 October 2022
Sevilla	(Spain) Julen Lopetegui	Sacked	5 October 2022	17th	(Argentina) Jorge Sampaoli	6 October 2022
Elche	(Spain) Alberto Gallego	End of caretaker spell	12 October 2022	20th	(Argentina) Jorge Almirón	12 October 2022
Villarreal	(Spain) Unai Emery	Signed by Aston Villa	24 October 2022	7th	(Spain) Quique Setién	25 October 2022
Celta Vigo	(Argentina) Eduardo Coudet	Sacked	2 November 2022	16th	(Portugal) Carlos Carvalhal	2 November 2022
Elche	(Argentina) Jorge Almirón	Sacked	7 November 2022	20th	(Spain) Pablo Machín	17 November 2022
Valencia	(Italy) Gennaro Gattuso	Mutual consent	31 January 2023	14th	(Spain) Voro (interim)	31 January 2023
Valencia	(Spain) Voro (interim)	End of caretaker spell	14 February 2023	18th	(Spain) Rubén Baraja	14 February 2023
Elche	(Spain) Pablo Machín	Sacked	20 March 2023	20th	(Argentina) Sebastián Beccacece	21 March 2023
Sevilla	(Argentina) Jorge Sampaoli	Sacked	21 March 2023	14th	(Spain) José Luis Mendilibar	21 March 2023
Valladolid	(Spain) Pacheta	Sacked	3 April 2023	15th	(Uruguay) Paulo Pezzolano	4 April 2023
Espanyol	(Spain) Diego Martínez	Sacked	3 April 2023	17th	(Spain) Luis García	3 April 2023
Getafe	(Spain) Quique Sánchez Flores	Sacked	27 April 2023	18th	(Spain) José Bordalás	29 April 2023

== League table ==
Pos	Team	Pld	W	D	L	GF	GA	GD	Pts	Qualification or relegation
1	Barcelona (C)	38	28	4	6	70	20	+50	88	Qualification for the Champions League group stage
2	Real Madrid	38	24	6	8	75	36	+39	78	Qualification for the Champions League group stage
3	Atlético Madrid	38	23	8	7	70	33	+37	77	Qualification for the Champions League group stage
4	Real Sociedad	38	21	8	9	51	35	+16	71	Qualification for the Champions League group stage
5	Villarreal	38	19	7	12	59	40	+19	64	Qualification for the Europa League group stage
6	Real Betis	38	17	9	12	46	41	+5	60	Qualification for the Europa League group stage
7	Osasuna	38	15	8	15	37	42	−5	53	Qualification for the Europa Conference League play-off round (Note: Osasuna were initially disqualified from the 2023–24 UEFA Europa Conference League due to historic match-fixing. However, the club became later eligible to participate after an evidence of innocence had been provided.)
8	Athletic Bilbao	38	14	9	15	47	43	+4	51	
9	Mallorca	38	14	8	16	37	43	−6	50	
10	Girona	38	13	10	15	58	55	+3	49 (Note: Head-to-head points: Girona 8, Rayo Vallecano 6, Sevilla 1.)	
11	Rayo Vallecano	38	13	10	15	45	53	−8	49	
12	Sevilla	38	13	10	15	47	54	−7	49	Qualification for the Champions League group stage (Note: Sevilla qualified for the 2023–24 UEFA Champions League by winning the 2022–23 UEFA Europa League.)
13	Celta Vigo	38	11	10	17	43	53	−10	43	
14	Cádiz	38	10	12	16	30	53	−23	42 (Note: Head-to-head points: Cádiz 8, Getafe 5, Valencia 3.)	
15	Getafe	38	10	12	16	34	45	−11	42	
16	Valencia	38	11	9	18	42	45	−3	42	
17	Almería	38	11	8	19	49	65	−16	41	
18	Valladolid (R)	38	11	7	20	33	63	−30	40	Relegation to Segunda División
19	Espanyol (R)	38	8	13	17	52	69	−17	37	Relegation to Segunda División
20	Elche (R)	38	5	10	23	30	67	−37	25	Relegation to Segunda División

Source: LaLiga Santander
Rules for classification: 1) Points; 2) Head-to-head points; 3) Head-to-head goal difference; 4) Goal difference; 5) Goals scored; 6) Fair-play points (Note: Head-to-head record is used only after all the matches between the teams in question have been played)
(C) Champions; (R) Relegated

== Results ==
Home \ Away	BAR	RMA	ATM	RSO	VIL	BET	OSA	ATH	MLL	GIR	RAY	SEV	CEL	CAD	GET	VAL	ALM	VLL	ESP	ELC
Barcelona	—	2–1	1–0	1–2	3–0	4–0	1–0	4–0	3–0	0–0	0–0	3–0	1–0	2–0	1–0	1–0	2–0	4–0	1–1	3–0
Real Madrid	3–1	—	1–1	0–0	2–3	2–1	1–1	1–1	4–1	1–1	2–1	3–1	2–0	2–1	1–0	2–0	4–2	6–0	3–1	4–0
Atlético Madrid	0–1	1–2	—	2–1	0–2	1–0	3–0	1–0	3–1	2–1	1–1	6–1	4–1	5–1	1–1	3–0	2–1	3–0	1–1	2–0
Real Sociedad	1–4	2–0	1–1	—	1–0	0–2	2–0	3–1	1–0	2–2	2–1	2–1	1–1	0–0	2–0	1–1	1–0	0–1	2–1	2–0
Villarreal	0–1	2–1	2–2	2–0	—	1–1	2–0	5–1	0–2	1–0	0–1	1–1	3–1	2–0	2–1	2–1	2–1	1–2	4–2	4–0
Real Betis	1–2	0–0	1–2	0–0	1–0	—	1–0	0–0	1–0	2–1	3–1	1–1	3–4	0–2	0–1	1–1	3–1	2–1	3–1	3–0
Osasuna	1–2	0–2	0–1	0–2	0–3	3–2	—	2–0	1–0	2–1	2–1	2–1	0–0	2–0	0–2	1–2	3–1	2–0	1–0	2–1
Athletic Bilbao	0–1	0–2	0–1	2–0	1–0	0–1	0–0	—	0–0	2–3	3–2	0–1	2–1	4–1	0–0	1–0	4–0	3–0	0–1	0–1
Mallorca	0–1	1–0	1–0	1–1	4–2	1–2	0–0	1–1	—	1–1	3–0	0–1	1–0	1–0	3–1	1–0	1–0	1–0	1–1	0–1
Girona	0–1	4–2	0–1	3–5	1–2	1–2	1–1	2–1	2–1	—	2–2	2–1	0–1	1–1	3–1	1–0	6–2	2–1	2–1	2–0
Rayo Vallecano	2–1	3–2	1–2	0–2	2–1	1–2	2–1	0–0	0–2	2–2	—	1–1	0–0	5–1	0–0	2–1	2–0	2–1	1–2	2–1
Sevilla	0–3	1–2	0–2	1–2	2–1	0–0	2–3	1–1	2–0	0–2	0–1	—	2–2	1–0	2–1	1–1	2–1	1–1	3–2	3–0
Celta Vigo	2–1	1–4	0–1	1–2	1–1	1–0	1–2	1–0	0–1	1–1	3–0	1–1	—	3–0	1–1	1–2	2–2	3–0	2–2	1–0
Cádiz	0–4	0–2	3–2	0–1	0–0	0–0	0–1	0–4	2–0	2–0	1–0	0–2	1–0	—	2–2	2–1	1–1	2–0	2–2	1–1
Getafe	0–0	0–1	0–3	2–1	0–0	0–1	2–1	2–2	2–0	3–2	1–1	2–0	1–0	0–0	—	1–0	1–2	2–3	1–2	1–1
Valencia	0–1	1–0	0–1	1–0	1–1	3–0	1–0	1–2	1–2	1–0	1–1	0–2	3–0	0–1	5–1	—	2–2	2–1	2–2	2–2
Almería	1–0	1–2	1–1	0–2	0–2	2–3	0–1	1–2	3–0	3–2	3–1	2–1	3–1	1–1	1–0	2–1	—	0–0	3–1	2–1
Valladolid	3–1	0–2	2–5	1–0	0–3	0–0	0–0	1–3	3–3	1–0	0–1	0–3	4–1	0–1	0–0	1–0	1–0	—	2–1	2–1
Espanyol	2–4	1–3	3–3	2–3	0–1	1–0	1–1	1–2	2–1	2–2	0–2	2–3	1–3	0–0	1–0	2–2	3–3	1–0	—	2–2
Elche	0–4	0–3	1–0	0–1	3–1	2–3	1–1	1–4	1–1	1–2	4–0	1–1	0–1	1–1	0–1	0–2	1–1	1–1	0–1	—

Source: La Liga
Legend: Blue = home team win; Yellow = draw; Red = away team win.
For upcoming matches, an "a" indicates there is an article about the rivalry between the two participants.

== Season statistics ==
=== Scoring ===
- First goal of the season:
  (Argentina) Ezequiel Ávila for Osasuna against Sevilla (12 August 2022)
- Final goal of the season:
  (Spain) Adri Embarba for Almería against Espanyol (4 June 2023)

=== Top goalscorers ===
Rank	Player	Club	Goals
1	(Poland) Robert Lewandowski	Barcelona	23
2	(France) Karim Benzema	Real Madrid	19
3	(Spain) Joselu	Espanyol	16
4	(France) Antoine Griezmann	Atlético Madrid	15
4	(Spain) Borja Iglesias	Real Betis	15
4	(Kosovo) Vedat Muriqi	Mallorca	15
7	(Turkey) Enes Ünal	Getafe	14
8	(Argentina) Taty Castellanos	Girona	13
8	(Spain) Álvaro Morata	Atlético Madrid	13
10	(Spain) Iago Aspas	Celta Vigo	12
10	(Senegal) Nicolas Jackson	Villarreal	12
10	(Norway) Alexander Sørloth	Real Sociedad	12

=== Top assists ===
Rank	Player	Club	Assists
1	(France) Antoine Griezmann	Atlético Madrid	16
2	(Brazil) Vinícius Júnior	Real Madrid	10
3	(Spain) Mikel Merino	Real Sociedad	9
4	(Poland) Robert Lewandowski	Barcelona	8
4	(Brazil) Rodrygo	Real Madrid	8
6	(France) Ousmane Dembélé	Barcelona	7
6	(Argentina) Rodrigo De Paul	Atlético Madrid	7
6	(Spain) Brian Oliván	Espanyol	7
6	(Spain) Isi Palazón	Rayo Vallecano	7
6	(Spain) Yeremy Pino	Villarreal	7
6	(Brazil) Raphinha	Barcelona	7
6	(Argentina) Lucas Robertone	Almería	7
6	(Spain) Dani Rodríguez	Mallorca	7

=== Zamora Trophy ===
The Zamora Trophy was awarded by newspaper Marca to the goalkeeper with the lowest goals-to-games ratio. A goalkeeper had to have played at least 28 matches of 60 or more minutes to be eligible for the trophy.

Rank	Player	Club	Matches	Goals against	Average
1	(Germany) Marc-André ter Stegen	Barcelona	37	18	0.49
2	(Slovenia) Jan Oblak	Atlético Madrid	28	20	0.71
3	(Spain) Álex Remiro	Real Sociedad	38	35	0.92
4	(Belgium) Thibaut Courtois	Real Madrid	31	29	0.94
5	(Serbia) Predrag Rajković	Mallorca	36	40	1.11

=== Hat-tricks ===
Player	For	Against	Result	Date	Round
(Spain) Oihan Sancet	Athletic Bilbao	Cádiz	4–1 (H)	3 February 2023	20
(Spain) Pere Milla	Elche	Villarreal	3–1 (H)	4 February 2023	20
(France) Karim Benzema	Real Madrid	Valladolid	6–0 (H)	2 April 2023	27
(Argentina) Taty Castellanos^{4}	Girona	Real Madrid	4–2 (H)	25 April 2023	31
(France) Karim Benzema	Real Madrid	Almería	4–2 (H)	29 April 2023	32
(Brazil) Lázaro	Almería	Mallorca	3–0 (H)	20 May 2023	35

^{4} – Player scored four goals.

=== Discipline ===
==== Player ====
- Most yellow cards: 14
  - (Spain) Fede San Emeterio (Cádiz)
  - (Spain) Óscar Gil (Espanyol)
- Most red cards: 3
  - (France) Florian Lejeune (Rayo Vallecano)
  - (Argentina) Germán Pezzella (Real Betis)
  - (Spain) Isaac Carcelén (Cádiz)
  - (Italy) Luiz Felipe (Real Betis)
  - (Argentina) Marcos Acuna (Sevilla)
  - (Senegal) Pape Gueye (Sevilla)

==== Team ====
- Most yellow cards: 121
  - Mallorca
- Most red cards: 15
  - Betis
- Fewest yellow cards: 68
  - Real Madrid
- Fewest red cards: 2
  - Real Sociedad

== Awards ==
=== Player of the Season ===
Pos.	Player	Club	Ref.
GK	(Germany) Marc-André ter Stegen	Barcelona	

=== Player of the Month ===
Month	Player of the Month		Reference
Month	Player	Club	Reference
August	(Spain) Borja Iglesias	Real Betis	
September	(Uruguay) Federico Valverde	Real Madrid	
October	(Poland) Robert Lewandowski	Barcelona	
January	(Norway) Alexander Sørloth	Real Sociedad	
February	(Spain) Gabri Veiga	Celta Vigo	
March	(France) Antoine Griezmann	Atlético Madrid	
April	(Morocco) Youssef En-Nesyri	Sevilla	
May	(Senegal) Nicolas Jackson	Villarreal	

=== Team of the season ===
Team of the Season
Goalkeeper	(Germany) Marc-André ter Stegen (Barcelona)				
Defenders	(Argentina) Nahuel Molina (Atlético Madrid)	(France) Jules Koundé (Barcelona)	(Brazil) Éder Militão (Real Madrid)	(Spain) David García (Osasuna)	(Spain) Alejandro Balde (Barcelona)
Midfielders	(Spain) Gabri Veiga (Celta Vigo)	(Uruguay) Federico Valverde (Real Madrid)	(Spain) Mikel Merino (Real Sociedad)	(Spain) Pedri (Barcelona)	(Croatia) Luka Modrić (Real Madrid)
Forwards	(France) Antoine Griezmann (Atlético Madrid)		(France) Karim Benzema (Real Madrid)	(Poland) Robert Lewandowski (Barcelona)	(Brazil) Vinícius Júnior (Real Madrid)

== Attendances ==
#	Football club	Home games	Average attendance
1	FC Barcelona	19	83,415
2	Real Madrid	19	56,727
3	Atlético de Madrid	19	55,255
4	Real Betis	19	49,015
5	Athletic Club	19	43,527
6	Valencia CF	19	40,688
7	Sevilla FC	19	35,589
8	Real Sociedad	19	32,265
9	RCD Espanyol	19	21,521
10	Real Valladolid	19	20,578
11	Elche CF	19	19,812
12	CA Osasuna	19	19,753
13	Cádiz CF	19	17,768
14	Villarreal CF	19	16,326
15	RCD Mallorca	19	14,778
16	Celta de Vigo	19	14,339
17	UD Almería	19	12,942
18	Rayo Vallecano	19	12,546
19	Getafe CF	19	11,495
20	Girona FC	19	11,423

== See also ==
- 2022–23 Segunda División
- 2022–23 Primera Federación
- 2022–23 Segunda Federación
- 2022–23 Tercera Federación
