= Langendorf, Switzerland =

Langendorf
- Municipality
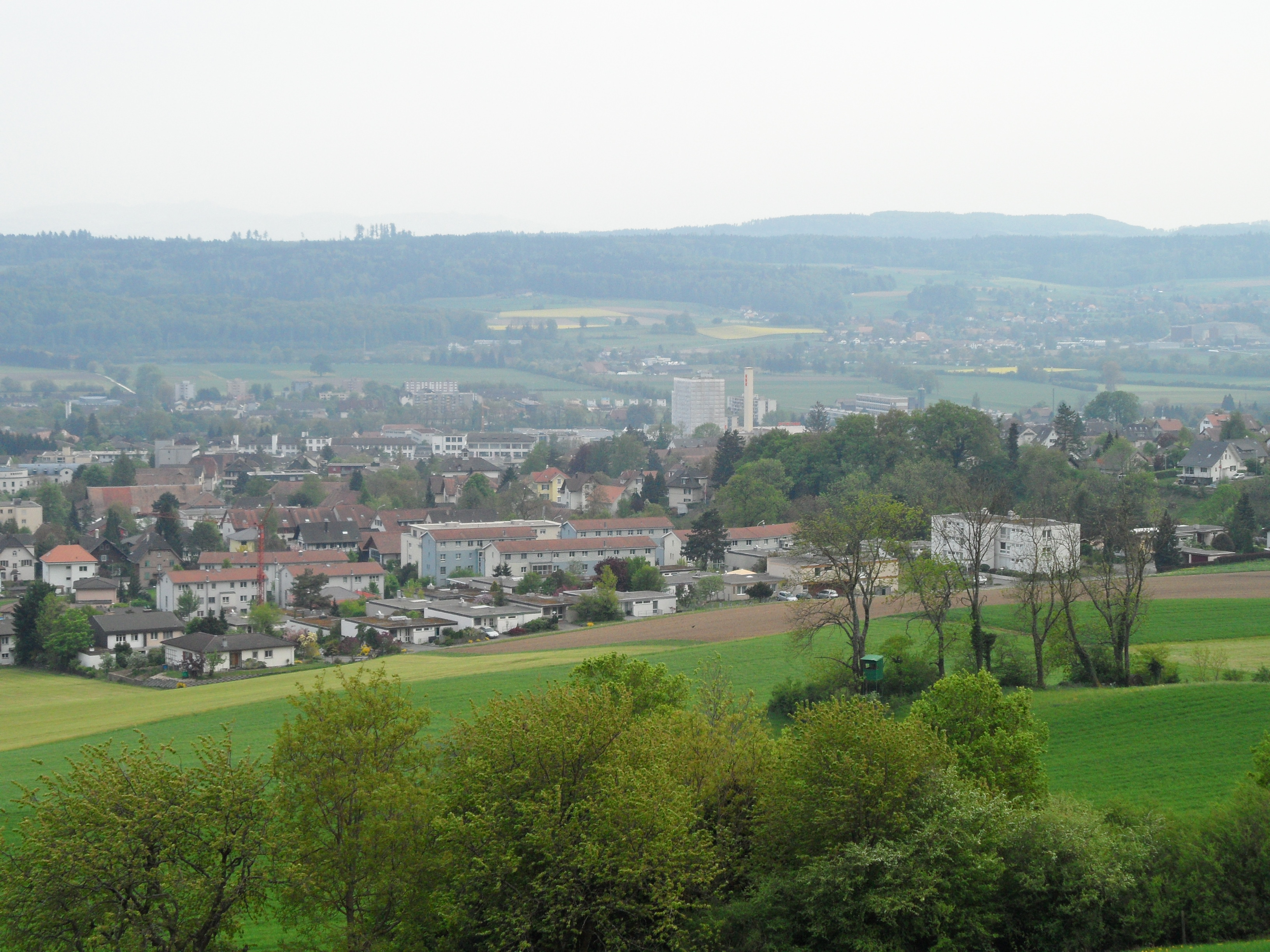
- View of Langendorf

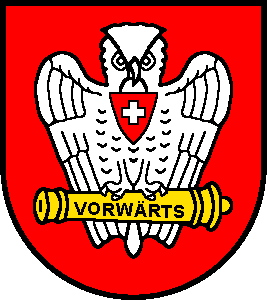
- Coat of arms
- Location of Langendorf
- Location within Switzerland Location within Canton of Solothurn
- Coordinates: 47°13′N 7°31′E
- Country: Switzerland
- Canton: Solothurn
- District: Lebern

Government
  - Mayor: Hanspeter Berger

Area
  - Total: 1.93 km^{2} (0.75 sq mi)
- Elevation: 496 m (1,627 ft)

Population (December 2020)
  - Total: 3,775
  - Density: 1,960/km^{2} (5,070/sq mi)
- Time zone: UTC+01:00 (CET)
  - Summer (DST): UTC+02:00 (CEST)
- Postal code: 4513
- SFOS number: 2550
- ISO 3166 code: CH-SO
- Surrounded by: Bellach, Oberdorf, Rüttenen, Solothurn
- Website: langendorf-so.ch

Langendorf (Swiss Standard German pronunciation: [ˈlaŋəndɔrf]) is a municipality in the Swiss canton of Solothurn, located in the district of Lebern.

== History ==
Langendorf is first mentioned in 1304 as Lengendorf.

== Geography ==
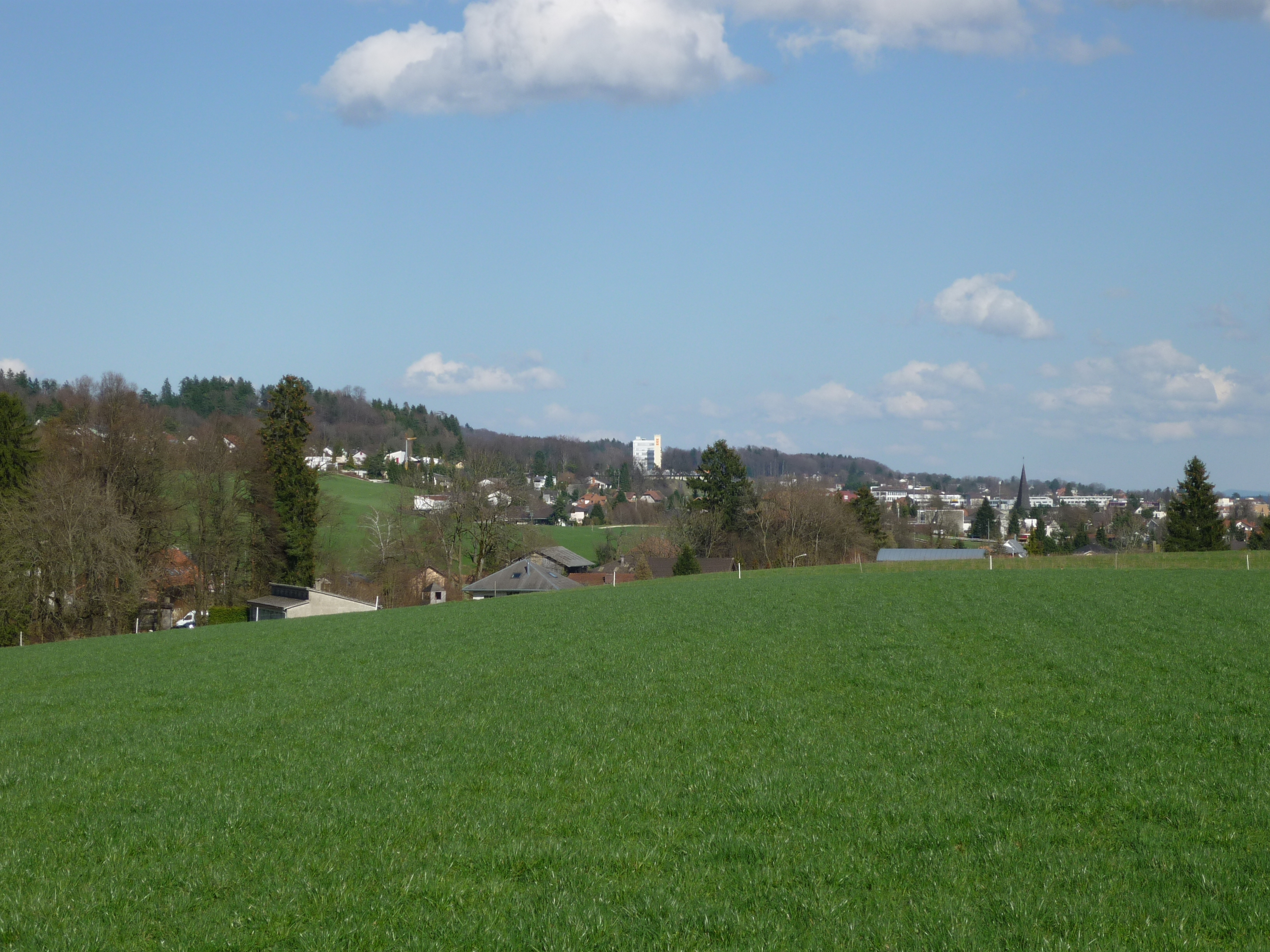
View of the municipalities of Bellach (foreground) and Langendorf (background)

Aerial view (1958)

Langendorf has an area, as of 2009, of 1.93 square kilometers (0.75 sq mi). Of this area, 0.77 km^{2} (0.30 sq mi) or 39.9% is used for agricultural purposes, while 0.22 km^{2} (0.085 sq mi) or 11.4% is forested. Of the rest of the land, 0.95 km^{2} (0.37 sq mi) or 49.2% is settled (buildings or roads), 0.01 km^{2} (2.5 acres) or 0.5% is either rivers or lakes.

Of the built up area, industrial buildings made up 5.2% of the total area while housing and buildings made up 33.2% and transportation infrastructure made up 7.8%. while parks, green belts and sports fields made up 2.6%. Out of the forested land, all of the forested land area is covered with heavy forests. Of the agricultural land, 25.9% is used for growing crops and 13.0% is pastures. All the water in the municipality is flowing water.

The municipality is located in the Lebern district. Originally it was a linear village on both sides of the Wildbach river. Today it is part of the agglomeration of Solothurn.

The municipalities of Biberist, Derendingen, Luterbach, Bellach, Langendorf and Solothurn are considering a merger at a date in the future into the new municipality of with an, as of 2011, undetermined name.

== Coat of arms ==
The blazon of the municipal coat of arms is Gules an Owl displayed Argent holding in beak on a strap an escutcheon Gules a Cross couped Argent (Switzerland) standing on a Cannon Pipe Or mouth to dexter inscribed "VORWÄRTS" of the first.

== Demographics ==
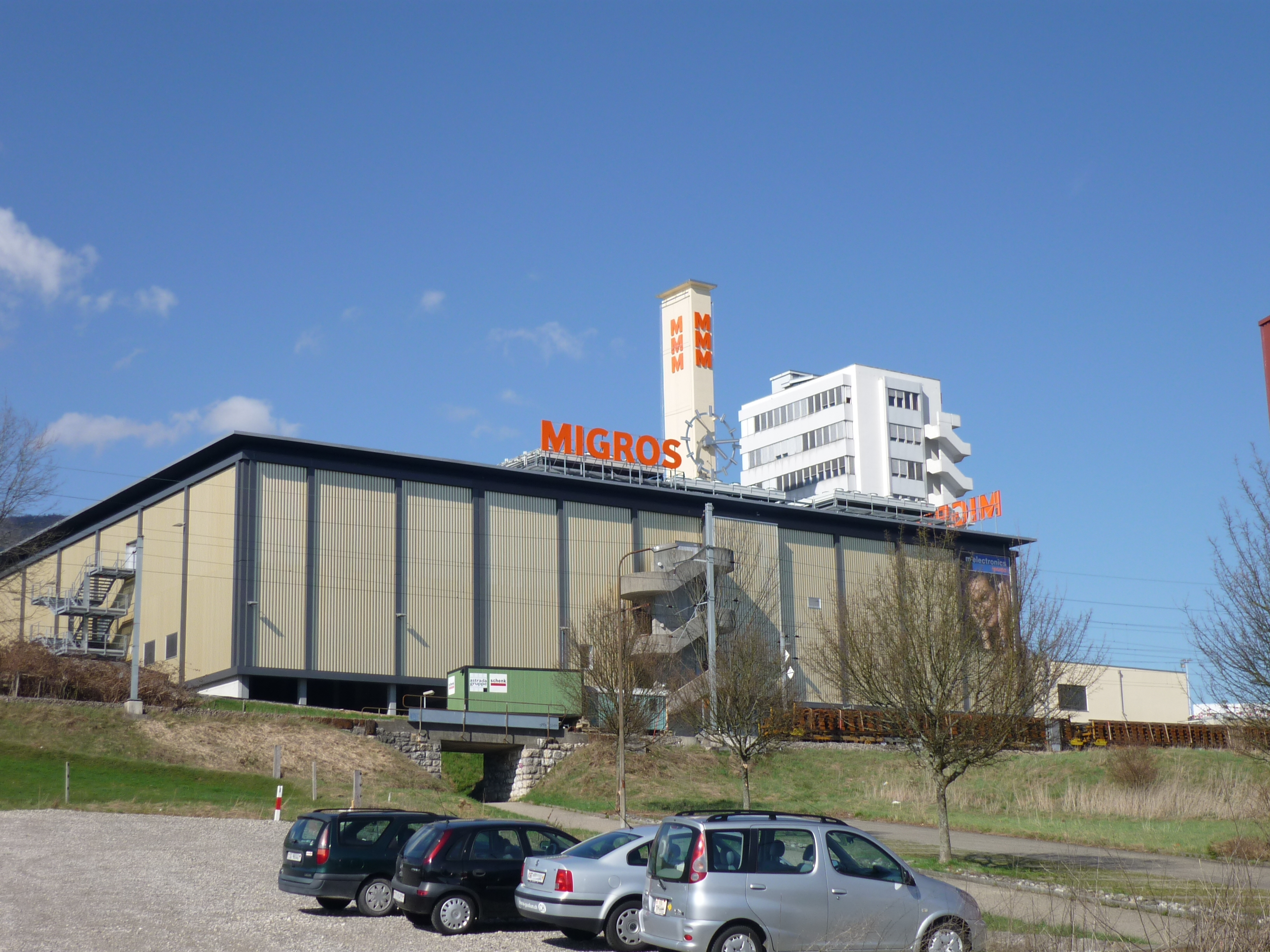
Migros shopping center in a building of the former Lanco watch making factory

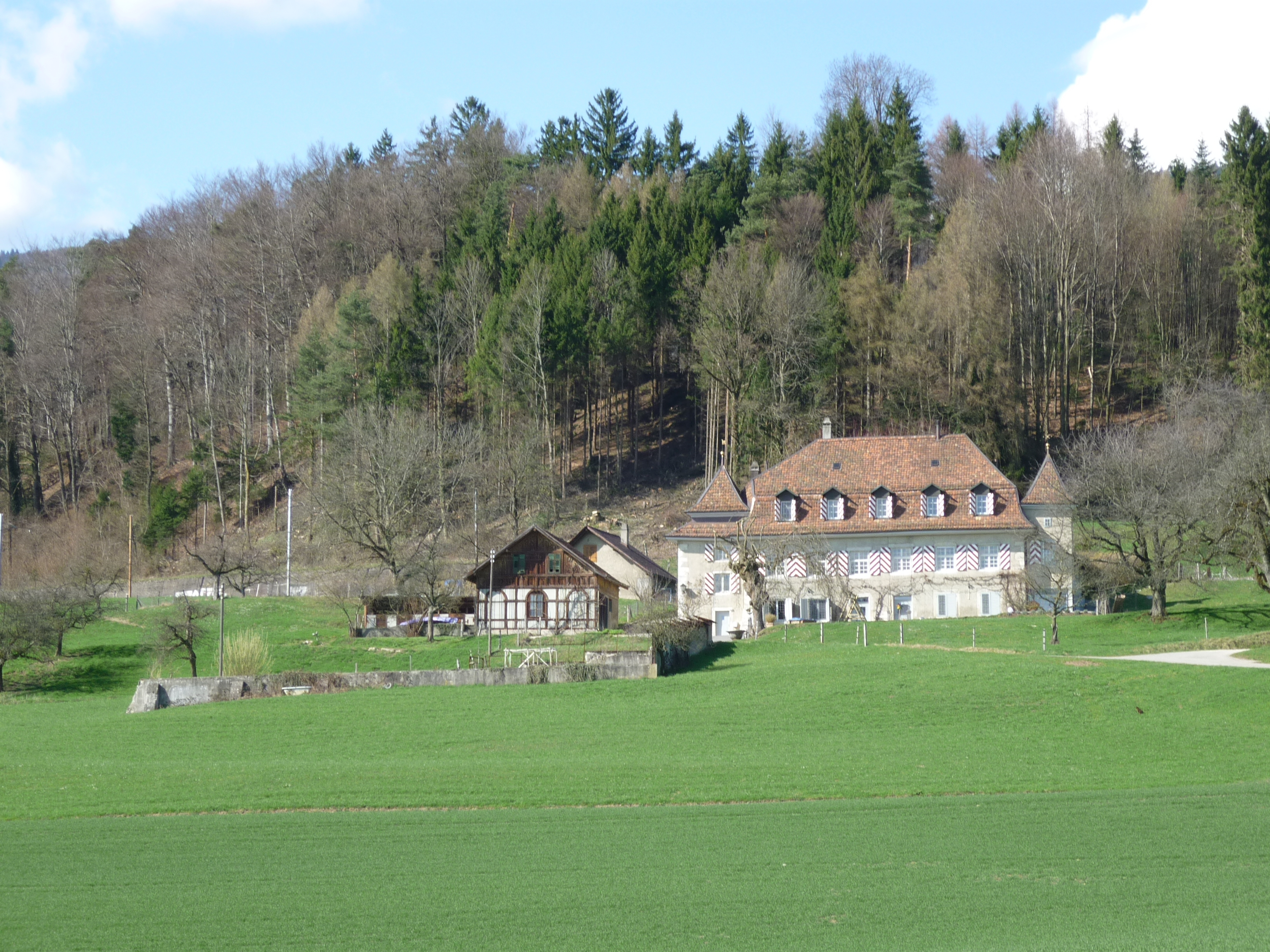
Staalenhof in Langendorf village

Langendorf has a population (as of December 2020) of 3,775. As of 2008, 13.6% of the population are resident foreign nationals. Over the last 10 years (1999–2009) the population has changed at a rate of 6.2%.

Most of the population (as of 2000) speaks German (3,136 or 92.2%), with Italian being second most common (96 or 2.8%) and French being third (31 or 0.9%). There are 4 people who speak Romansh.

As of 2008, the gender distribution of the population was 48.1% male and 51.9% female. The population was made up of 1,437 Swiss men (40.3% of the population) and 278 (7.8%) non-Swiss men. There were 1,626 Swiss women (45.6%) and 227 (6.4%) non-Swiss women. Of the population in the municipality 766 or about 22.5% were born in Langendorf and lived there in 2000. There were 1,206 or 35.5% who were born in the same canton, while 889 or 26.1% were born somewhere else in Switzerland, and 417 or 12.3% were born outside of Switzerland.

In 2008 there were 23 live births to Swiss citizens and 5 births to non-Swiss citizens, and in same time span there were 40 deaths of Swiss citizens and 3 non-Swiss citizen deaths. Ignoring immigration and emigration, the population of Swiss citizens decreased by 17 while the foreign population increased by 2. There were 11 Swiss men and 6 Swiss women who immigrated back to Switzerland. At the same time, there were 9 non-Swiss men and 6 non-Swiss women who immigrated from another country to Switzerland. The total Swiss population change in 2008 (from all sources, including moves across municipal borders) was an increase of 16 and the non-Swiss population increased by 8 people. This represents a population growth rate of 0.7%.

The age distribution, as of 2000, in Langendorf is; 238 children or 7.0% of the population are between 0 and 6 years old and 464 teenagers or 13.6% are between 7 and 19. Of the adult population, 181 people or 5.3% of the population are between 20 and 24 years old. 969 people or 28.5% are between 25 and 44, and 846 people or 24.9% are between 45 and 64. The senior population distribution is 500 people or 14.7% of the population are between 65 and 79 years old and there are 202 people or 5.9% who are over 80.

As of 2000, there were 1,304 people who were single and never married in the municipality. There were 1,655 married individuals, 248 widows or widowers and 193 individuals who are divorced.

As of 2000, there were 1,514 private households in the municipality, and an average of 2.2 persons per household. There were 520 households that consist of only one person and 62 households with five or more people. Out of a total of 1,539 households that answered this question, 33.8% were households made up of just one person and there were 13 adults who lived with their parents. Of the rest of the households, there are 486 married couples without children, 392 married couples with children There were 89 single parents with a child or children. There were 14 households that were made up of unrelated people and 25 households that were made up of some sort of institution or another collective housing.

In 2000 there were 465 single family homes (or 62.2% of the total) out of a total of 748 inhabited buildings. There were 201 multi-family buildings (26.9%), along with 49 multi-purpose buildings that were mostly used for housing (6.6%) and 33 other use buildings (commercial or industrial) that also had some housing (4.4%). Of the single family homes 15 were built before 1919, while 56 were built between 1990 and 2000. The greatest number of single family homes (96) were built between 1946 and 1960.

In 2000 there were 1,606 apartments in the municipality. The most common apartment size was 3 rooms of which there were 502. There were 62 single room apartments and 497 apartments with five or more rooms. Of these apartments, a total of 1,485 apartments (92.5% of the total) were permanently occupied, while 53 apartments (3.3%) were seasonally occupied and 68 apartments (4.2%) were empty. As of 2009, the construction rate of new housing units was 4.2 new units per 1000 residents. The vacancy rate for the municipality, in 2010, was 1.05%.

The historical population is given in the following chart:

== Politics ==
In the 2007 federal election the most popular party was the FDP which received 25.65% of the vote. The next three most popular parties were the SP (23.89%), the CVP (18.13%) and the SVP (18.08%). In the federal election, a total of 1,358 votes were cast, and the voter turnout was 53.2%.

== Economy ==
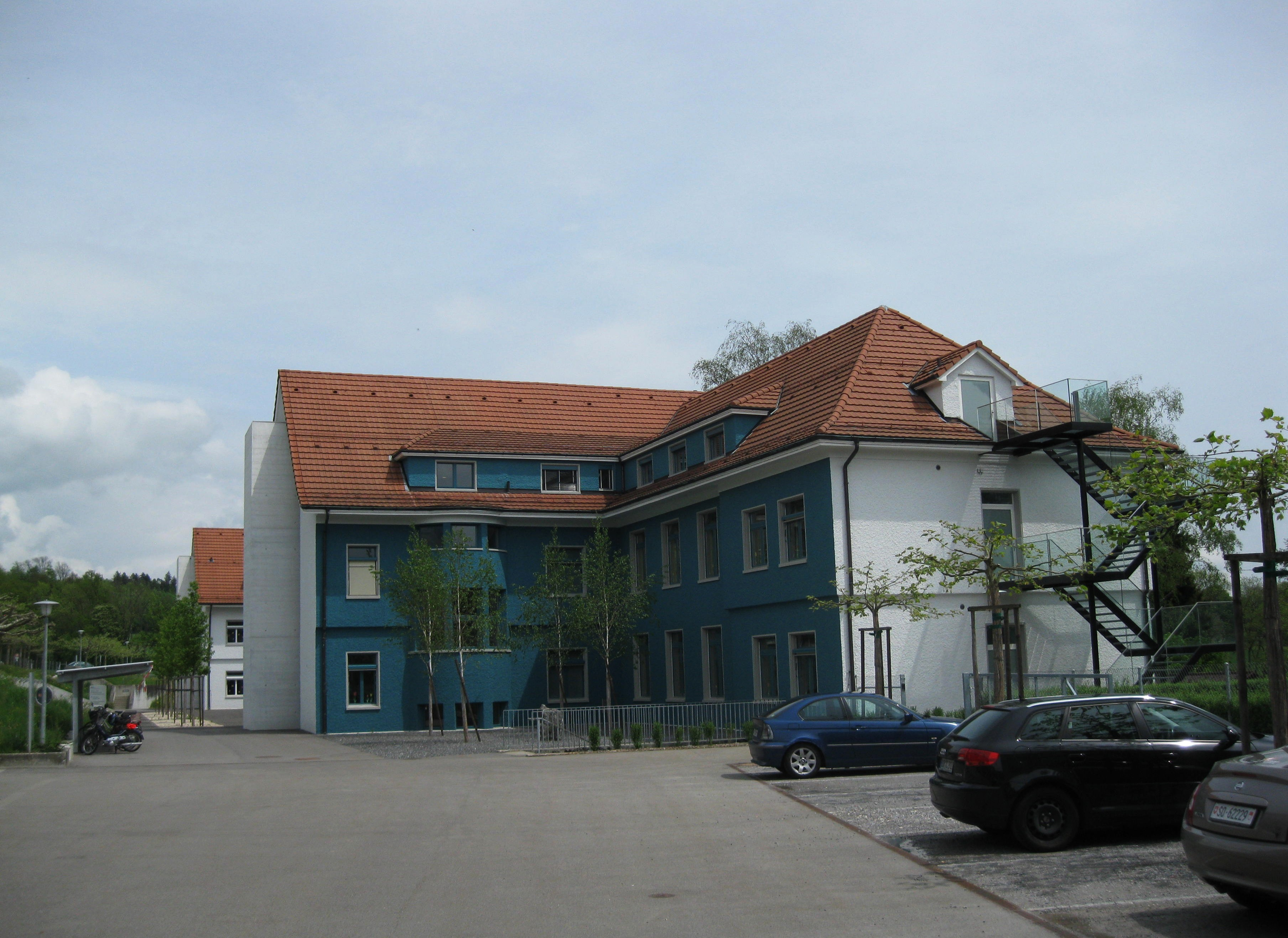
Psychiatric clinic in Langendorf

As of 2010, Langendorf had an unemployment rate of 2.5%. As of 2008, there were 6 people employed in the primary economic sector and about 3 businesses involved in this sector. 310 people were employed in the secondary sector and there were 24 businesses in this sector. 1,312 people were employed in the tertiary sector, with 96 businesses in this sector. There were 1,732 residents of the municipality who were employed in some capacity, of which females made up 44.0% of the workforce.

In 2008 the total number of full-time equivalent jobs was 1,057. The number of jobs in the primary sector was 4, of which 3 were in agriculture and 1 was in forestry or lumber production. The number of jobs in the secondary sector was 293 of which 239 or (81.6%) were in manufacturing and 54 (18.4%) were in construction. The number of jobs in the tertiary sector was 760. In the tertiary sector; 236 or 31.1% were in wholesale or retail sales or the repair of motor vehicles, 45 or 5.9% were in the movement and storage of goods, 36 or 4.7% were in a hotel or restaurant, 1 was in the information industry, 17 or 2.2% were technical professionals or scientists, 58 or 7.6% were in education and 182 or 23.9% were in health care.

In 2000, there were 861 workers who commuted into the municipality and 1,399 workers who commuted away. The municipality is a net exporter of workers, with about 1.6 workers leaving the municipality for every one entering. Of the working population, 19.6% used public transportation to get to work, and 52.8% used a private car.

== Religion ==
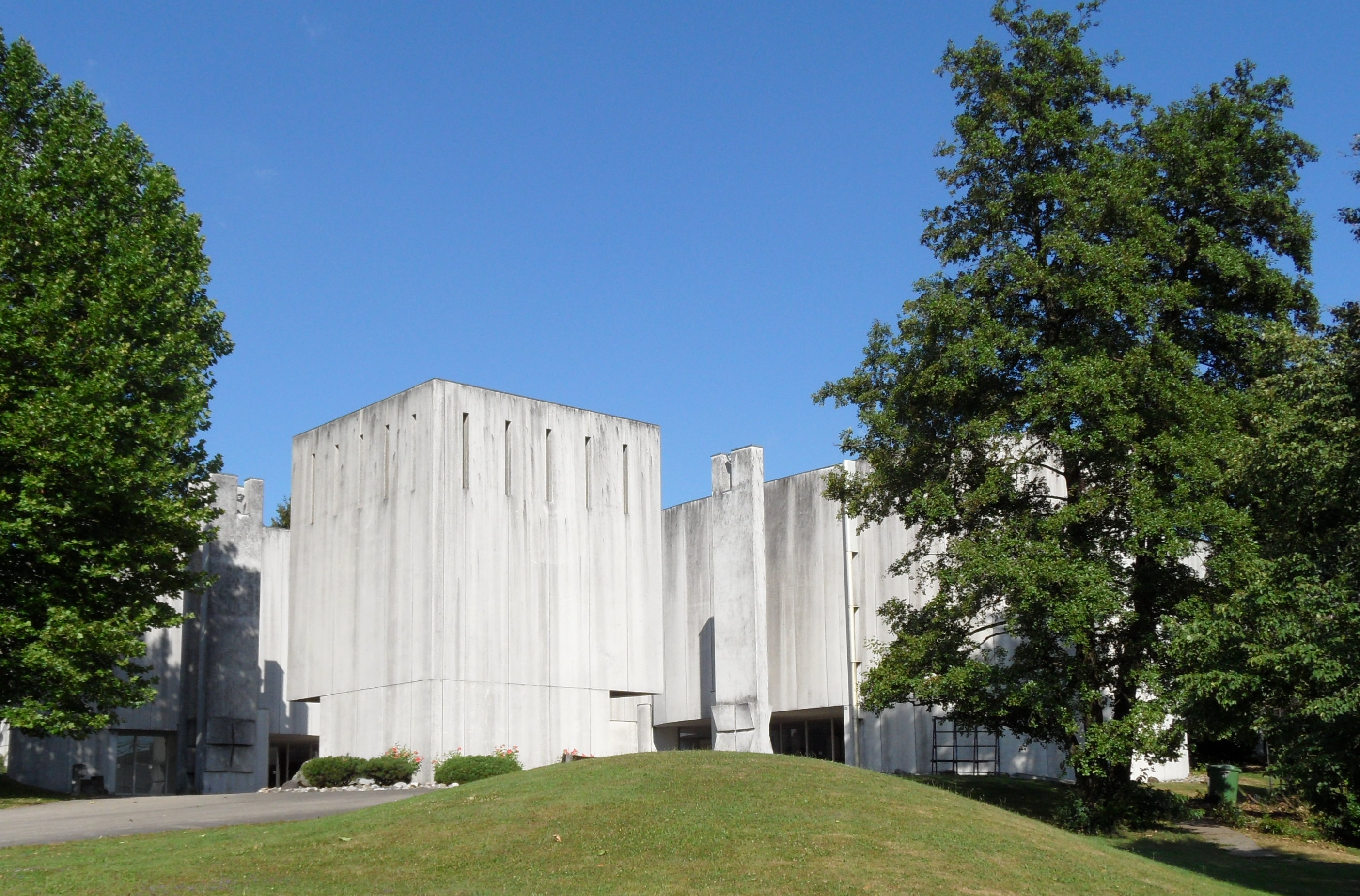
Ecumenical church centre in Langendorf

From the 2000 census, 1,291 or 38.0% were Roman Catholic, while 1,263 or 37.1% belonged to the Swiss Reformed Church. Of the rest of the population, there were 31 members of an Orthodox church (or about 0.91% of the population), there were 25 individuals (or about 0.74% of the population) who belonged to the Christian Catholic Church, and there were 57 individuals (or about 1.68% of the population) who belonged to another Christian church. There were 2 individuals (or about 0.06% of the population) who were Jewish, and 83 (or about 2.44% of the population) who were Islamic. There were 2 individuals who were Buddhist and 2 individuals who belonged to another church. 558 (or about 16.41% of the population) belonged to no church, are agnostic or atheist, and 86 individuals (or about 2.53% of the population) did not answer the question.

== Education ==
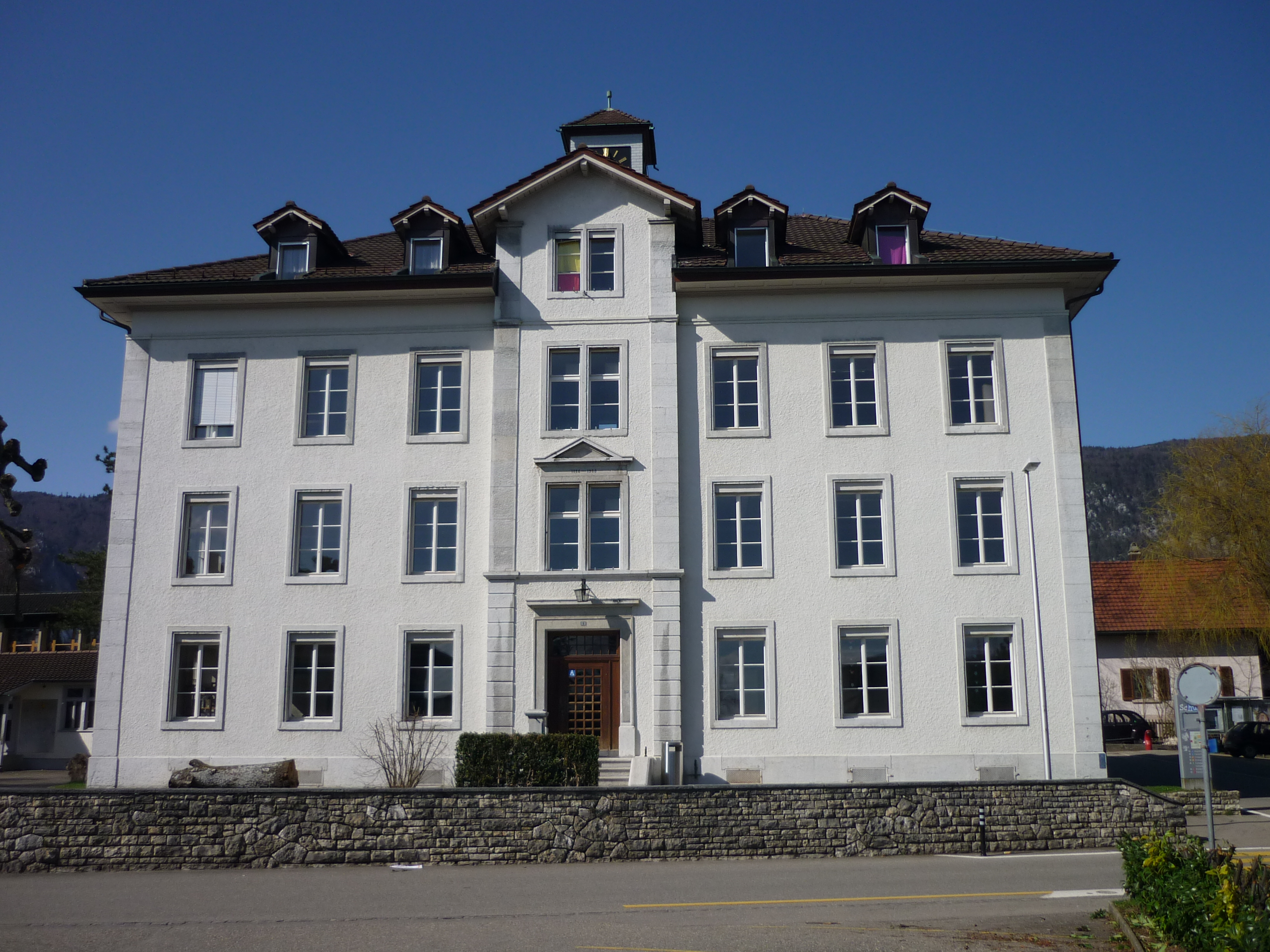
School building in Langendorf

In Langendorf about 1,434 or (42.2%) of the population have completed non-mandatory upper secondary education, and 507 or (14.9%) have completed additional higher education (either university or a Fachhochschule). Of the 507 who completed tertiary schooling, 67.7% were Swiss men, 21.5% were Swiss women, 8.1% were non-Swiss men and 2.8% were non-Swiss women.

During the 2010–2011 school year there were a total of 232 students in the Langendorf school system. The education system in the Canton of Solothurn allows young children to attend two years of non-obligatory Kindergarten. During that school year, there were 57 children in kindergarten. The canton's school system requires students to attend six years of primary school, with some of the children attending smaller, specialized classes. In the municipality there were 167 students in primary school and 8 students in the special, smaller classes. The secondary school program consists of three lower, obligatory years of schooling, followed by three to five years of optional, advanced schools. All the lower secondary students from Langendorf attend their school in a neighboring municipality.

As of 2000, there were 221 students in Langendorf who came from another municipality, while 113 residents attended schools outside the municipality.
