= Atromitos F.C. =

Greek football club

Atromitos
- Full name: APS Atromitos Athens Football Club
- Nicknames: Atrómitos (Fearless); Kyanólefki (The Cyan-Whites)
- Founded: 31 May 1923; 103 years ago
- Ground: Peristeri Stadium
- Capacity: 8,969
- Owner: ETEKA
- President: Vasilios Betsis
- Head coach: Dušan Kerkez
- League: Super League Greece
- 2025–26: Super League Greece, 9th of 14
- Website: atromitosfc.gr
Home colours	Away colours	Third colours

Atromitos Football Club (Greek: Π.Α.Ε. Α.Π.Σ. Ατρόμητος Αθηνών, PAE APS Atromitos Athinon), also simply known as Atromitos lit. 'Fearless'), is a Greek professional football club based in Peristeri, a suburban city in the Athens agglomeration, that competes in the Super League. Founded in 1923, club's home ground is Peristeri Stadium.

In the past few years, Atromitos has established itself as one of the most competitive and strong clubs in Greece. They were runners-up of the Greek Cup in 2011 and 2012 and have had breakthrough runs in the league, finishing 4th in 2011–12, 3rd in 2012–13, 4th in 2013–14 and 4th as well in 2014–15 and 2018–19. Their best performance in the league has been third place, which they have achieved in the 1928 and 2013 seasons of the Greek Championship.

== History ==
=== Early years ===
Atromitos was officially founded on 31 May 1923 when Kalomvounis, Petos, Glykofridis, Stathopoulos, Synodinos, Rigopoulos, Stamatopoulos, and other students living in Victoria Square, (which was then called Kyriakou Square) decided to form a football team. That same year, Vaggelis Stamatis, a mathematics teacher and member of the Panhellenic football league, joined Atromitos' administration board – because of his prominence in pre-war Greek football history, Stamatis' involvement increased the new team's stature in Athenian football.

=== First league steps ===
In 1924, Atromitos was accepted into the Greek football league. At the time, Atromitos played at Aris Park, which was the home ground of Panellinios and Panathinaikos. During their first season in the league's first division, they ended in third place behind Panathinaikos and AEK. In 1928, they defeated Goudi 4–3 in the final game at Rouf Stadium to become champions of Athens. That same year, they took part in the first Panhellenic Championship as Athens champions, which was organised by the HFF. On 24 May 1928, they were beaten 3–1 by Aris Thessaloniki (who later became champions) in an away game, and were defeated again on 3 June by Ethnikos Piraeus (5–0). On 10 June, they managed a draw at home against Ethnikos (1–1), before losing again to Aris 3–1 seven days later. Overall in the national championship, Atromitos finished third.

During the following two years, Atromitos stayed in the upper part of the first division of Athens, and in 1929, they finished third behind Panathinaikos and AEK Athens. They repeated the feat in 1930 but they were relegated from the first division of Athens in 1931, as they came last with only one point.

=== Move to Peristeri ===
In 1932, Ioseph Chourouktsoglou and Nikolaos Epioglou decided to move Atromitos to Peristeri. Earlier, it was located in the same area as Panathinaikos, and they had found it hard to establish a large fan base or develop a unique identity. There, they formed a merger with the local team of Astir Peristeriou (meaning "Star"), from which comes the crest of Atromitos, a blue star.

Before occupation of Greece, they played again in Panhellenic championship in the season of 1938–39.

Atromitos played in the second division until May 1972 when, under the coaching of Savvas Papazoglou, they were re-promoted to the first level. It proved a change too hard to handle, and they were demoted the following year. In 1975, a better-prepared Atromitos returned to the first division with a large fanbase, and ended the year in 13th place, securing their spot in the top flight. In 1976, they improved to end the season in 9th place, the best in the club's history. But, they were relegated in 1977.

By 1981, Atromitos had succeeded in attracting renowned players such as Stylianopoulos, Álvarez, Toskas and Athanasopoulos. However, despite high expectations, the club finished last in the top flight, and once more returned to the lower divisions. After years of playing in the third division, Atromitos won promotion back to the second division in May 2002 by beating Levadiakos at Patras Stadium. The team played again in the top flight between 2005 and 2008 by merging with Chalkidona and returned to the top flight after playing one season in the second division in 2008–09.

In the 2010–11 season, Atromitos made a historic run to the Greek Cup Final. However, they lost 3–0 to AEK.

=== Recent years ===
==== 2012–13 season ====
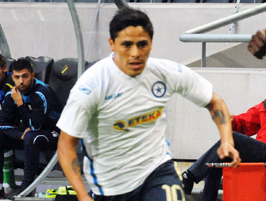
Javier Umbides

Atromitos finished the 1st half of the season in 4th place, together with Asteras Tripolis and 14 points from the top, but 4 points from 6th place, that doesn't redirect to the playoffs. On 6 January 2013, at the debut of Nikos Anastopoulos in the coaching position and the Portuguese footballer Fabio, Atromitos beat Kerkyra 2–0, with two headers. From Sokratis Fytanidis at the 26th minute and from Stathis Tavlaridis at the 31st minute. In other words, the win was awarded to the team by the two centre backs. The team stayed in 4th with Asteras Tripolis, but later 6 points from the 6th place. One matchday later, they managed to get the 0–0 from PAOK at Toumba, retaining the 6 points difference from PAS Giannina. On Matchday 18, they beat Platanias 1–0, getting to be only 3 points from 2nd place. The goal was scored by Eduardo Brito.

==== 2015–16 season ====
For the 2015–16 season, Atromitos has achieved an important qualification to the UEFA Europa League playoffs after recording two wins against AIK Stockholm, 3–1 in the first game in Sweden and 1–0 in the rematch at Peristeri Stadium. There they faced highly rated Fenerbahçe S.K. of Turkey. They lost 0–1 in the first match at Peristeri Stadium and 0–3 in the rematch in Turkey and were eliminated.

==== Damir Canadi's era ====
At 21 June 2017, Atromitos announced Damir Canadi as the new head coach of the club. At 23 October 2017, Atromitos won AEK Athens 0–1 in an away game and then recognition began. Atromitos finished 4th at the 2017–18 season.

On 20 March 2017, announced that Canadi will manage the club also for the 2018–19 season. The 2018–19 season began for Atromitos with an early elimination in the Europa League by Dynamo Brest (3–4 and 1–1), conceding a goal in the final minute of the second leg in Peristeri. However, an excellent run in the league followed, with the team finishing in fourth place once again and securing its participation in European competitions for a second consecutive year. Efthymis Koulouris, on loan from PAOK, emerged as the top scorer of the Super League, while in the Greek Cup he made impressive appearances in the group stage, defeating Iraklis 1–6 and Thyella Kamari 0–8, reaching the quarter-finals where he was eliminated by AEK Athens.

== Crest and colours ==
=== Crest evolution ===
Until 2012

2012–current

=== Kit evolution ===
First

2006–07	2011–14	2015–16	2018–19

Alternative

2006–07	2006–07	2015–16	2015–16	2018–19

== Facilities ==
=== Stadium ===
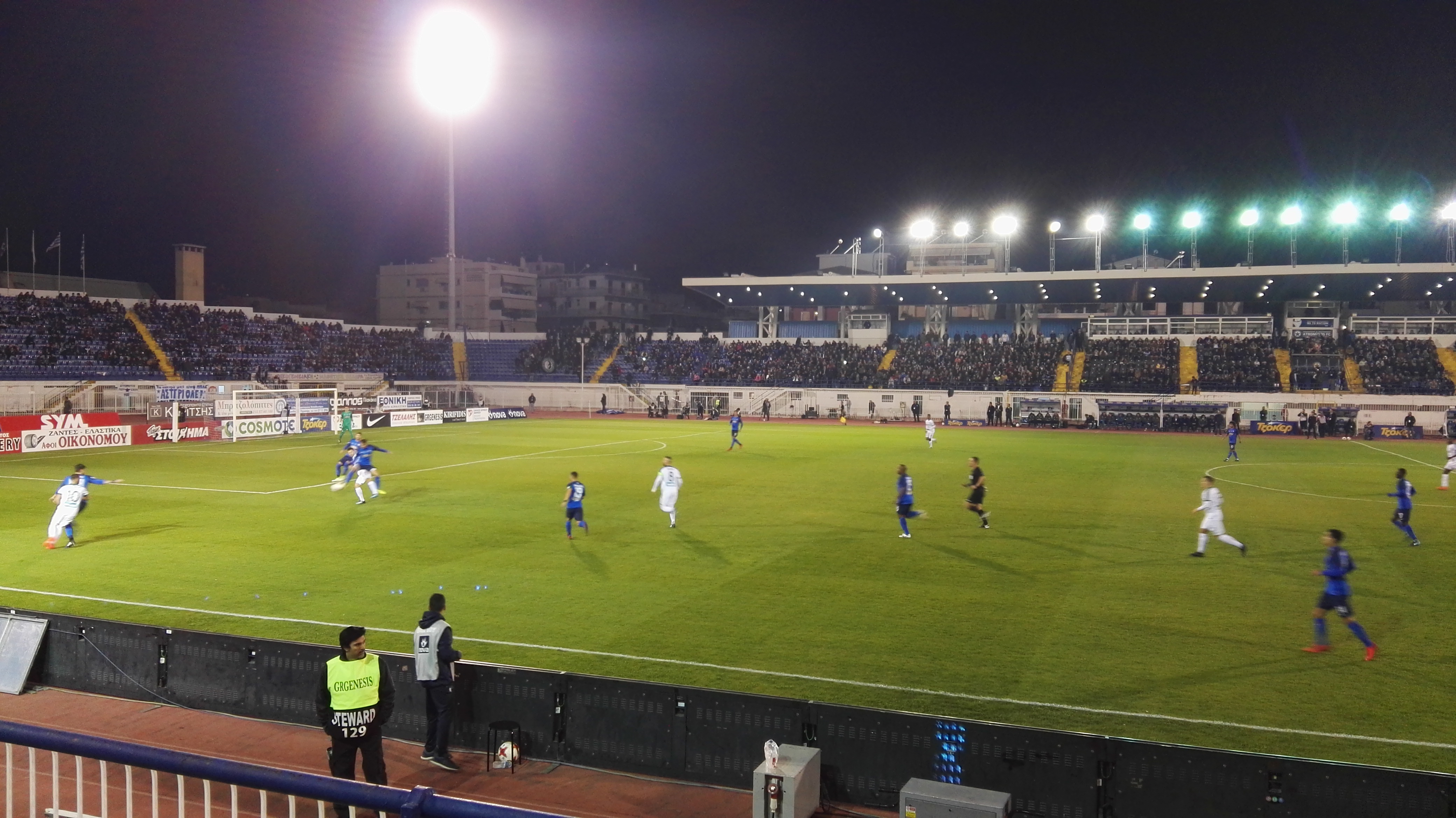
Peristeri Stadium

The home ground of Atromitos was once well-maintained but has been recently neglected. In its early days, Peristeri had grown to become the fourth largest municipality in Greece. The first club home ground was the grounds of "Bravery", which was located beyond the last shanty town of Evangelistria.

In 1953, Atromitos moved to their present location, which contained only central stands for the spectators; the changing rooms consisted of a small room at the end of the stands. Much later, a larger stand was built with a capacity of 6,000 spectators. It was also used for non-football purposes, such as musical performances.

During the chairmanship of Victor Mitropoulos in EPAE, blue and white plastic seats were installed in the central stand. Before the Athens Olympics, Atromitos installed floodlights and renovated the running track so the ground could be used as a coaching facility during the Olympic Games. Under the football ground there are spaces and facilities for activities such as wrestling, chess and boxing.

Repairs to fragile parts of the stadium due to humidity and earthquake damage are expected to be carried out.

=== Training ground ===
Since summer of 2007, Atromitos possesses a modern Sports Complex, located in the center of Peristeri. During the summer of 2004, this same Sports Complex has been used as the Peristeri Olympic Boxing Hall and includes a 3,000 spectators main pitch, an auxiliary pitch as well as a 5-a-side pitch, such as the club's offices.

Plus, Atromitos possess installations situated on NATO Avenue, in the Aspropyrgos area. The Aspropyrgos training center includes a football pitch, dressing rooms, a fully equipped gym and a massage area. The Aspropyrgos football pitch is also being used by the Atromitos U-21 and U-17 youth teams.

== Supporters ==
Atromitos are based in western Athens and their main supporters club is called "Fentagin". Founded in 1980, they have a space underneath the stands. They are dedicated to support the local football club and their anti-fascist and anti-racist ideas and actions. The younger element of the support are known as the "Little Atoms".

== Players ==
=== Current squad ===
As of 22 September 2026

Note: Flags indicate national team as defined under FIFA eligibility rules; some limited exceptions apply. Players may hold more than one non-FIFA nationality.

No.	Pos.	Nation	Player
1	GK	GRE	Lefteris Choutesiotis (captain)
2	DF	GRE	Lefteris Lyratzis
4	DF	GRE	Dimitrios Stavropoulos
5	MF	GRE	Theocharis Tsingaras
6	MF	GRE	Athanasios Karamanis
7	MF	SUI	Steven Zuber
8	MF	COD	Samuel Moutoussamy
9	FW	COL	Juan José Perea
10	MF	GRE	Stavros Pnevmonidis (on loan from Olympiacos)
11	MF	CRC	Cristopher Núñez (on loan from Cartaginés)
12	MF	GRE	Mattheos Mountes
14	MF	ESP	Dani García
16	DF	GRE	Georgios Papadopoulos
17	MF	ALB	Elton Hoxha
19	FW	GRE	Panagiotis Tsantilas

No.	Pos.	Nation	Player
20	MF	GRE	Spyros Ampartzidis
21	DF	FIN	Jere Uronen
23	MF	GRE	Sotiris Tsiloulis
24	DF	GRE	Gerasimos Mitoglou
29	DF	GRE	Petros Tsagdis
30	MF	GRE	Anastasios Kotsis
31	GK	GRE	Vasilios Athanasiou
32	DF	ISL	Hörður Björgvin Magnússon
33	MF	GRE	Konstantinos Batos
35	FW	GRE	Vangelis Paliouras
44	DF	GRE	Dimitrios Tsakmakis
70	MF	BRA	Serginho
88	GK	SEN	Seny Dieng
97	MF	GHA	Kelvin Ofori
99	FW	GRE	Georgios Tzovaras

=== Out on loan ===
Note: Flags indicate national team as defined under FIFA eligibility rules; some limited exceptions apply. Players may hold more than one non-FIFA nationality.

No.	Pos.	Nation	Player
—	MF	GRE	Leonardos Kopanidis (at Marko until 30 June 2027)

=== Records and statistics ===
Information correct as of the match played on 22 May 2025. Bold denotes an active player for the club.
The tables refer to Atromitos' players in Super League Greece, Greek Football Cup, Second Division Greece, Third Division Greece and UEFA Europa League.

==== Top 10 Most Capped Players ====
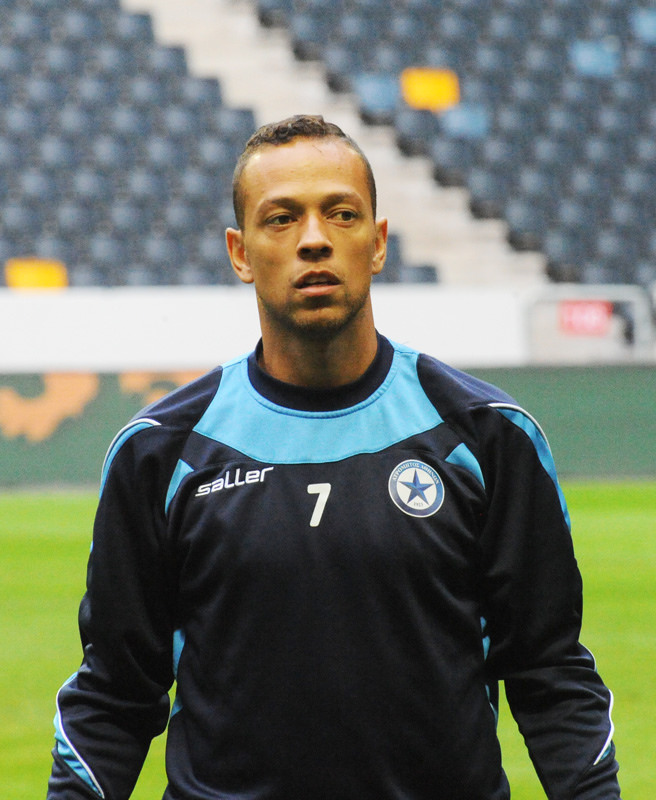
Luiz Brito is the most-capped player of Atromitos in professional football

R.	Player	Years	Apps
1	(Brazil) Luiz Brito	2008–2017	287
2	(Argentina) Javier Umbides	2013–2021	278
3	(Greece) Kyriakos Kivrakidis	2014–2024	226
4	(Greece) Sokratis Fytanidis	2011–2017	209
5	(Greece) Chrysostomos Michailidis	2005–2011	183
6	(Greece) Nikolaos Lazaridis	2012–2017	171
7	(Argentina) Pitu García	2011–2016	165
8	(Greece) Vangelis Nastos	2009–2015	153
9	(Greece) Elini Dimoutsos	2011–2015	151
10	(Brazil) Marcelo Oliveira	2006–2011	131

==== Top 10 Goalscorers ====
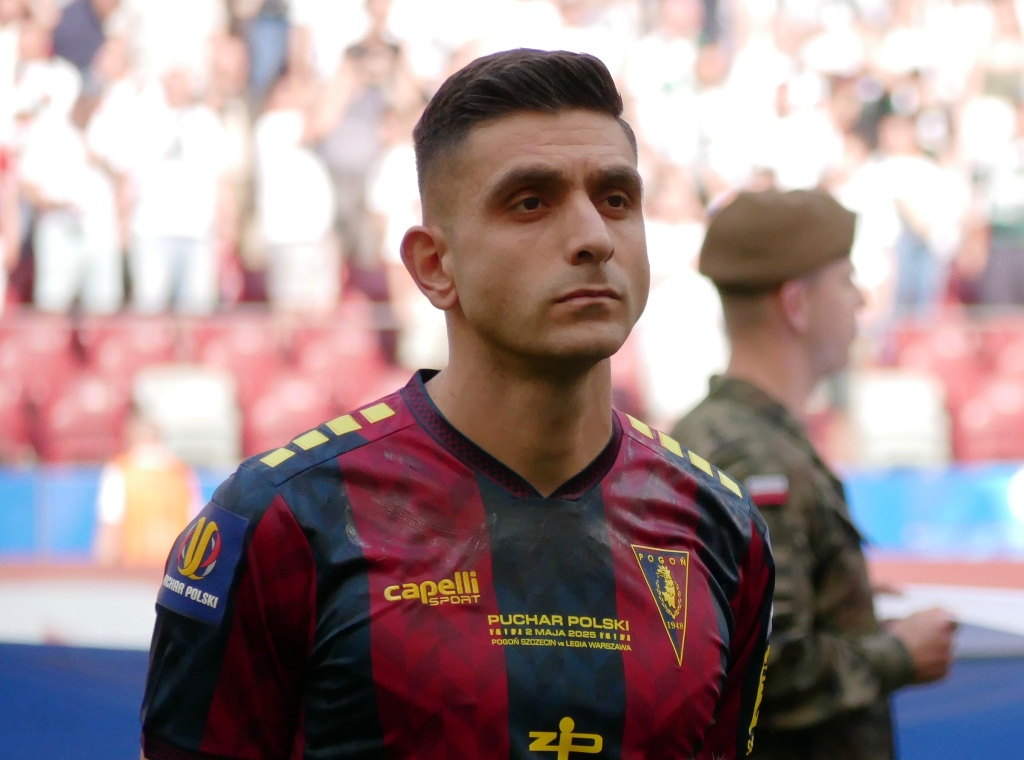
Efthymis Koulouris is the top scorer of Atromitos in professional football with Luiz Brito

R.	Player	Years	Goals
1	(Greece) Efthymis Koulouris	2018–2019; 2021–2022	39
1	(Brazil) Luiz Brito	2008–2017	39
3	(Italy) Stefano Napoleoni	2013–2016	35
4	(Greece) Giorgos Manousos	2017–2021	32
5	(Argentina) Emanuel Perrone	2008–2011	29
5	(Argentina) Javier Umbides	2013–2021	29
7	(Greece) Kostas Mitroglou	2011–2012	19
8	(Brazil) Luciano de Souza	2006–2008	17
8	(Greece) Dimitrios Papadopoulos	2013–2014; 2016–2017	17
8	(Egypt) Amr Warda	2017–2019; 2024–2025	17
8	(Greece) Ilias Anastasakos	2009–2012	17

== Honours and achievements ==
=== Honours ===
==== Leagues ====
- Football League (Second Division)
  - Winners (3): 1971–72, 1979–80, 2008–09
- Gamma Ethniki (Third Division)
  - Winners (1): 1988
- Delta Ethniki (Fourth Division)
  - Winners (1): 1998
- Athens FCA Regional Championship
  - Winners (2): 1928, 1962

=== Achievements ===
==== Leagues ====
- Super League
  - Third place (2): 1927–28, 2012–13

==== Cups ====
- Greek Cup
  - Runners-up (2): 2010–11, 2011–12

== Seasons in the 21st century ==
Season	Category	Position	Cup	Notes
2000–01	Gamma Ethniki	3rd	GS	
2001–02	Gamma Ethniki	5th	GS	Promoted to Beta Ethniki
2002–03	Beta Ethniki	9th	1R	
2003–04	Beta Ethniki	13th	2R	
2004–05	Beta Ethniki	15th	2R	Relegated to Gamma Ethniki, but merged with Chalkidona and took their place in Alpha Ethniki
Atromitos merged with Chalkidona
2005–06	Alpha Ethniki	7th	4R	Qualified to UEFA Cup
2006–07	Super League	8th	4R	
2007–08	Super League	14th	SF	Relegated to Beta Ethniki
2008–09	Beta Ethniki	1st	4R	Promoted to Super League
2009–10	Super League	7th	5R	
2010–11	Super League	11th	RU	
2011–12	Super League	4th	RU	Qualified to UEFA Europa League
2012–13	Super League	**3rd**	3R	Qualified to UEFA Europa League
2013–14	Super League	4th	QF	Qualified to UEFA Europa League
2014–15	Super League	4th	GS	Qualified to UEFA Europa League
2015–16	Super League	8th	SF	
2016–17	Super League	8th	QF	
2017–18	Super League	4th	QF	Qualified to UEFA Europa League
2018–19	Super League	4th	R16	Qualified to UEFA Europa League
2019–20	Super League	8th	QF	
2020–21	Super League	8th	1R	
2021–22	Super League	12th	5R	
2022–23	Super League	8th	R16	
2023–24	Super League	11th	QF	
2024–25	Super League	7th	R16	
2025–26	Super League	9th	PO	

Best position in bold.

Key: 1R = First Round, 3R = Third Round, 4R = Fourth Round, 5R = Fifth Round, GS = Group Stage, R16 = Round of 16, QF = Quarter-finals, SF = Semi-finals, RU = Runner-up.

== Personnel ==
=== Ownership and current board ===
Position	Staff
Owner	(Greece) Georgios Spanos
President	(Greece) Vasilios Betsis
A' Vice President & CEO	(Greece) Katia Koxenoglou
B' Vice President	(Greece) Vasilios Karakatsanis
C' Vice President	(Greece) Giannis Spiliotis
Board members	(Greece) Georgios Markovas (Greece) Antonis Karalis (Greece) Georgios Karachalios

Source: Atromitos F.C.

=== Executives ===
==== Administration department ====
Position	Staff
Marketing director	(Greece) Spyros Boulousis
Communication director	(Greece) Pavlos Kousteris

Source: Atromitos F.C.

==== Football department ====
Position	Staff
Technical director	(Greece) Giannis Angelopoulos
Team manager	(Greece) Manolis Ververidis
Chief scout	(Greece) Tolis Apostolou

Source: Atromitos F.C.

=== Coaching staff ===
Position	Staff
Head coach	(Bosnia and Herzegovina) Dušan Kerkez
Assistant coaches	(Serbia) Milovan Sikimić (Brazil) Rafael Ferreira
Fitness coach	(Serbia) Igor Delibašić
Goalkeeper coach	(Greece) Dimitrios Mousiaris
Analyst	(Greece) Christos Makrygiannis

Source: Atromitos F.C.

=== Medical staff ===
Position	Staff
Medical Director	(Greece) Dr. Nikolaos Piskopakis
Doctor	(Greece) Andreas Piskopakis
Physiotherapists	(Greece) Panagiotis Abeliotis (Greece) Dimitrios Grekos (Greece) Giannis Kagas

Source: Atromitos F.C.

== Former managers ==
- (Greece) Alekos Sofianidis (1999)
- (Serbia) Vladimir Petrović (1999–2000)
- (Greece) Georgios Paraschos (1 July 2002 – 9 January 2007)
- (Serbia) Dragan Kokotović (11 January 2007 – 9 July 2007)
- (Argentina) Ángel Guillermo Hoyos (10 July 2007 – 26 March 2008)
- (Brazil) Paulo Campos (28 March 2008)
- (Serbia) Dragan Kokotović (30 March 2008 – 25 April 2009)
- (Greece) Vasilis Vouzas (2009)
- (Greece) Georgios Donis (1 July 2009 – 30 May 2012)
- (Bosnia and Herzegovina) Dušan Bajević (2 June 2012 – 23 December 2012)
- (Greece) Nikos Anastopoulos (30 December 2012 – 7 April 2013)
- (Greece) Georgios Paraschos (8 April 2013 – 22 September 2014)
- (Portugal) Ricardo Sá Pinto (23 September 2014 – 5 February 2015)
- (Greece) Nikos Nioplias (6 February 2015 – 12 June 2015)
- (Greece) Michalis Grigoriou (14 June 2015 – 3 November 2015)
- (Greece) Traianos Dellas (8 November 2015 – 19 September 2016)
- (Greece) Georgios Korakakis (19 September 2016 – 6 February 2017)
- (Portugal) Ricardo Sá Pinto (6 February 2017 – 12 June 2017)
- (Austria) Damir Canadi (21 June 2017 – 5 May 2019)
- (Greece) Giannis Anastasiou (24 May 2019 – 16 November 2019)
- (Greece) Georgios Korakakis (17 November 2019 – 5 December 2019)
- (Greece) Savvas Pantelidis (5 Dece 2019 – 20 July 2020)
- (Austria) Damir Canadi (29 July 2020 – 4 February 2021)
- (Greece) Savvas Pantelidis (5 February 2021 – 30 June 2021)
- (Spain) Ángel López (1 July 2021 – 25 September 2021)
- (Greece) Georgios Paraschos (25 September 2021 – 19 December 2021)
- (Greece) Georgios Korakakis (17 November 2021 – 26 November 2021)
- (Greece) Panagiotis Goutsidis (26 November 2021 – 29 November 2021)
- (Wales) Chris Coleman (7 January 2022 – 10 October 2023)
- (Greece) Georgios Korakakis (10 October 2023 – 24 October 2023)
- (Serbia) Saša Ilić (24 October 2023 – 2 May 2024)
- (Greece) Georgios Korakakis (2 May 2024 – 30 June 2024)
- (Uruguay) Pablo García (1 July 2024 – 30 June 2025)
- (Greece) Leonidas Vokolos (1 July 2025 – 10 November 2025)
- (Bosnia and Herzegovina) Dušan Kerkez (15 November 2025 –

== European competitions record ==
Last update: 14 August 2019

Season	Competition	Round	Club	Home	Away	Aggregate
2006–07	UEFA Cup	1R	(Spain) Sevilla	1–2	0–4	1–6
2012–13	UEFA Europa League	PO	(England) Newcastle United	1–1	0–1	1–2
2013–14	UEFA Europa League	PO	(Netherlands) AZ	1–3	2–0	3–3 (a)
2014–15	UEFA Europa League	3Q	(Bosnia and Herzegovina) FK Sarajevo	1–3	2–1	3–4
2015–16	UEFA Europa League	3Q	(Sweden) AIK	1–0	3–1	4–1
2015–16	UEFA Europa League	PO	(Turkey) Fenerbahçe	0–1	0–3	0–4
2018–19	UEFA Europa League	2Q	(Belarus) Dynamo Brest	1–1	3–4	4–5
2019–20	UEFA Europa League	2Q	(Slovakia) DAC Dunajská Streda	3–2	2–1	5–3
2019–20	UEFA Europa League	3Q	(Poland) Legia Warsaw	0–2	0–0	0–2

Notes

- 1R: First round
- 2Q: Second qualifying round
- 3Q: Third qualifying round
- PO: Play-off round

== Sponsorships ==
- Great Shirt Sponsor: NetBet
- Official Sport Clothing Manufacturer: Capelli
- Gold Sponsor: Cosmote
- Official Sponsor: Athens Medical Group
