= Milan Rastavac =

Serbian football manager (born 1973)

Personal information
- Date of birth: 1 November 1973 (age 52)
- Place of birth: Vršac, SR Serbia, Yugoslavia
- Height: 1.80 m (5 ft 11 in)
- Position: Midfielder

Youth career
- 1980–1991: Vojvodina

Senior career*
Years	Team	Apps	(Gls)
- Vojvodina
- Kabel
- Dinamo Pančevo
1995–1997	Mladost Bački Jarak		

International career
1988–1990	Yugoslavia U16		

Managerial career
- 2000–2001: Al-Nasr Benghazi (assistant)
- 2001–2005: Novi Sad (youth)
- 2006–2010: Serbia U17
- 2010–2013: Serbia Women U19
- 2013–2014: Olimpija Ljubljana (assistant)
- 2014: Vojvodina (assistant)
- 2014–2017: Radnički Niš
- 2015–2017: Serbia U23
- 2017–2019: Xanthi
- 2018: Serbia (assistant)
- 2019–2022: Asteras Tripolis
- 2022–2023: Vojvodina
- 2023–2024: Asteras Tripolis
- 2024–2025: OFI
- 2026: Asteras Tripolis
- * Club domestic league appearances and goals

Milan Rastavac (Serbian: Милан Раставац; born 1 November 1973) is a Serbian professional football manager and former player.

== Playing career ==
Rastavac started his playing career in Vojvodina youth squad. During his playing career, his greatest success came in 1988–1989. He played on the Yugoslavia national u16 team with Mirko Jozić as a head coach. From 1990 to 1991 he played on the FC Vojvodina U19 team that was the champion of SFR Yugoslavia with Ilija Pantelić as a head coach. After a season in Dinamo Pančevo, he moved to club Mladost Bački Jarak member of Serbia and Montenegro first league, where in 1999 he ended his professional career at the age of 26.

== Managerial career ==
=== Beginnings ===
Rastavac started his coaching career as a coach assistant in Al-Nasr Benghazi senior team with Todor Veselinović as a head coach. He worked as a youth coach in Novi Sad with different age groups from U15 - U19 in a five-year period. In season 2004-2005 he won the Vojvodina Cup with Novi Sad U17 team.

=== FA Serbia ===
In 2006, he started to work for the Football Association of Serbia as an instructor with the different age groups from U12 to U16 and stayed at this position until 2013. As a head of instructor service he was one of the creators of different programs for different age groups of FA Serbia. In 2007, he became a lecturer at UEFA coaching school of FA Serbia. From 2013 to 2014 he was a member of expert committee of FA Serbia.

=== Serbia Women U19 ===
In an idea for practical implementation programs he managed Serbia women's national under-19 football team and was coach in women's A national team in period from 2010 to 2013. In 2011 they won first historical point on the elite round for the Euro qualifications. In 2011 they were on the EURO finals for U19 first and only time in Serbia WU19 history. In 2013 Serbia WU19 was the top scorer team in Euro qualifications with more than 6 goals per match.

=== Olimpija Ljubljana ===
In 2013, he worked as assistant coach at Olimpija Ljubljana (Slovenia) with Milorad Kosanović.

=== Vojvodina ===
In 2014, he worked as assistant coach at Vojvodina(Serbia) with Zoran Marić. During first semi season Vojvodina achieved the best season start in 100 years club history.

=== Radnički Niš ===
In 2015 his first job as a head coach was in Serbian SuperLiga club FK Radnički Niš. Under Rastavac, Radnički reached best semi season score in the past 33 years, and fewest goals (6) received per semi season in the club history. He makes great continuity of results and won 5th place twice in season 2015–16 as well as in season 2016–17.

=== Serbia U23 ===
In December 2015 he started to work as the head coach of the Serbia U23 national team. In a friendly match against Qatar Serbia has won 3–0.

=== Xanthi ===
From 12 June 2017 he started to work as the head coach of the Super League Greece club Xanthi.

== Managerial statistics ==
As of 1 March 2026

Managerial record by team and tenure
Team	Nat	From	To	Record				
Team	Nat	From	To	G	W	D	L	Win %
Radnički Niš	(Serbia)	11 March 2014	31 May 2017	104	40	28	36	38.46
Serbia U23	(Serbia)	1 December 2015	30 June 2016	10	6	4	0	60.00
Xanthi	(Greece)	12 June 2017	18 May 2019	60	19	20	21	31.67
Asteras Tripolis	(Greece)	5 December 2019	15 May 2022	105	34	33	38	32.38
Vojvodina	(Serbia)	1 June 2022	26 May 2023	25	11	10	4	44.00
Asteras Tripolis	(Greece)	31 May 2023	3 September 2024	40	14	7	19	35.00
OFI	(Greece)	13 October 2024	26 October 2025	44	16	8	20	36.36
Asteras Tripolis	(Greece)	15 January 2026	2 March 2026	7	1	0	6	14.29
Career totals				395	141	110	144	35.70
