= Langendorf Watch Company SA =

Swiss watchmaker

- Industry: Watch manufacturing
- Founded: 1873
- Founder: Johann Viktor Kottmann
- Headquarters: Langendorf, Switzerland
- Products: Watches

Langendorf Watch Company was a Swiss watchmaker known for its fine craftsmanship and great attention to detail. Around 1890, it was probably the largest producer of watches in the world. The company produced watches in Langendorf, Switzerland for exactly a century, from 1873 to 1973.

The most famous brand of the company was Lanco (an abbreviation of Langendorf Watch Company) that was launched as a brand name in the late 1950s. The brand was discontinued in the late 1960s, and revived again from 1971 to around 1980. The company was founded by Colonel Johann Viktor Kottmann and remained in his family's hands until 1964.

== History ==
=== Foundation ===
Colonel Johann Viktor Kottmann (1822–1881) founded Uhrenfabrik Langendorf SA in 1873. The factory remained in the hands of his family until 1964.

The factory was located in the village Langendorf, canton of Solothurn, district of Lebern, Switzerland. Johann Viktor Kottmann was from nearby Solothurn and had been involved in industrial production of chicory and tobacco products since the 1850s. The factory in Langendorf had been producing chicory since 1851, but was rebuilt in 1873 to produce ebauches (parts of movements for watches) for other watch producing companies.

At its founding, the company had been employing between 70 and 80 workers, but the number of workers was drastically reduced when the company almost suffered an economic collapse in 1880 – allegedly due to severe problems with alcoholism and absenteeism among employees. Perhaps for those reasons, the factory began organizing housing and training of their workers, and it gained a reputation for being socially responsible. It built schools, a hydrant system and financed the installation of electric lights in Langendorf. The Kottmann family also founded a society for community work that is still active.

=== Growth of the company ===
In the middle of 1880 – just before the company otherwise would have been liquidated – Johann's son Karl Kottmann (1844–1890) took over. Karl was able to attract specialists from western Switzerland who helped turn the company around. Orders began flowing in, and production was expanded strongly. In 1881, some 200 workers were employed at the factory. Production continued to soar under the leadership of Karl Kottmann, who was admired for implementing a rational and mechanized production line. He was also the architect behind the socially responsible initiatives taken by the company.

From 1887 and onwards, production was deepened, and the company became largely independent of suppliers. Karl Kottmann died in 1890, and the technical director, Lucien Tieche, took over the company and changed its name to Langendorf Watch Company.

All major watch producing companies from the Neuchâtel area were ordering parts and ebauches from Langendorf Watch Company whose workforce grew to around 1.000 by 1890. During that era, the factory was probably the largest watch producer in the world.

An advertisement from 1916 showing picture of the factory claimed that it employed 1.500 workers and produced 3.000 time-pieces daily. By 1920 the company was also producing alarm clocks. In 1924, a branch was established at Lommiswil, and the following year also an agency in La Chaux-de-Fonds. A 1959 advert boasted that a large new factory would be completed that year and produce Lanco watches.

=== Final years of the Kottmann family and the end of independency ===
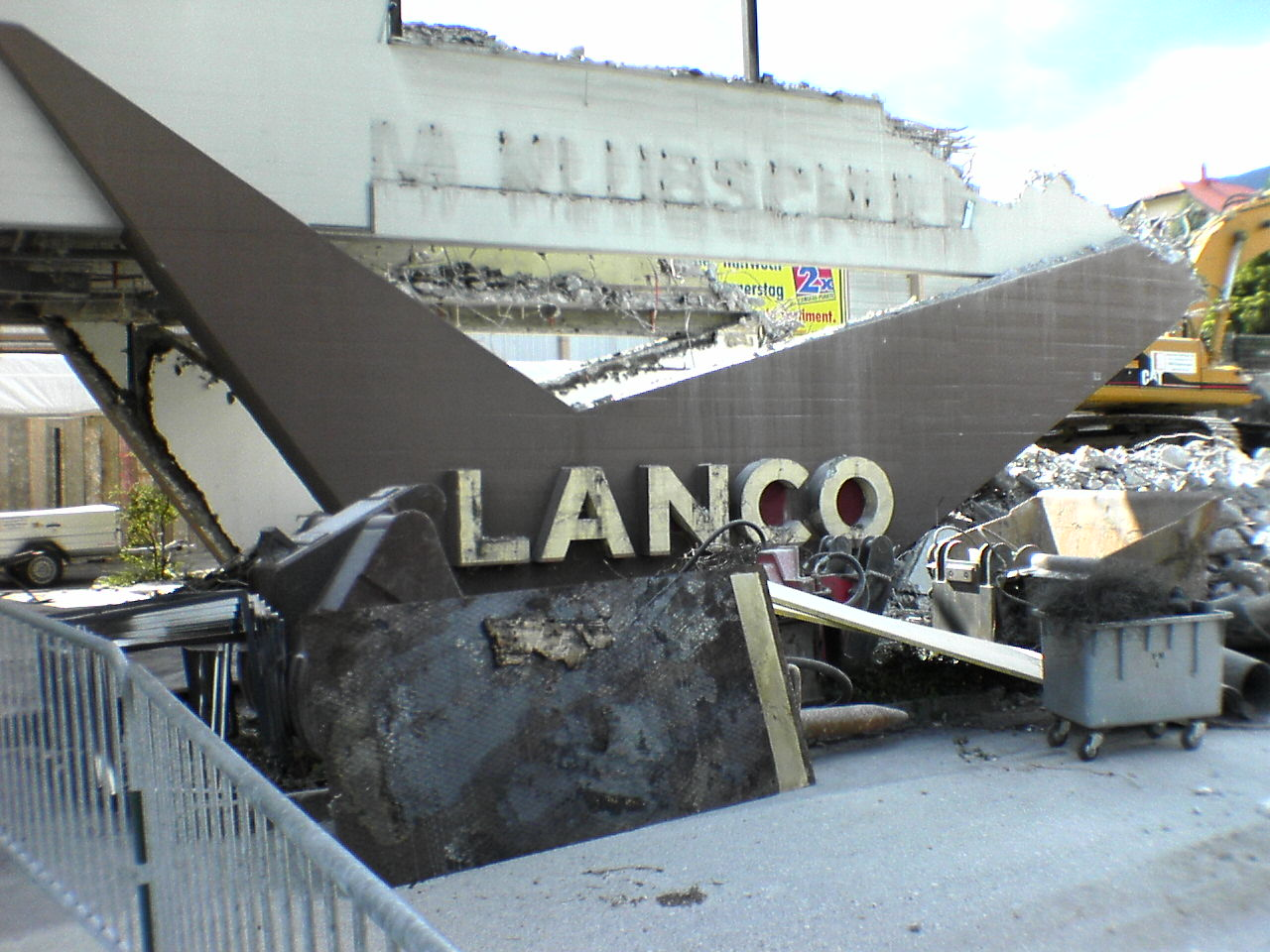
When the old factory building was modernized in 2008, an old concrete logo from the Langendorf Watch Company was uncovered.

In 1902, Ernst Kottmann (1874–1944) became manager of the company, which he led until 1942 when he had to resign for health reasons. Among other initiatives, Ernst made the change from steam-powered production to electricity. His brother Rudolf Kottmann held the position until 1964. Hans Kottmann took over in 1964, but died the same year in an accident. The company was then led by Guido Kottmann and a committee of family members, but due to challenging business conditions – and perhaps problems of mismanagement – the company decided to join a conglomerate of watch makers called "Schweizerische Gesellschaft für Uhrenindustrie AG" (SGU) in 1964.

Soon after, in 1965, the Langendorf Watch Company was bought by "Société Suisse pour l'Industrie Horlogère SA" (SSIH) which was itself the result of a 1930 merger between Omega and Tissot. Along with the Langendorf Watch Company, SSIH acquired more than fifty of its competitors, fueled by its newfound commercial success.

The Langendorf Watch Company was attractive for the Lanco brand and its highly sophisticated and semi-automated production line with modern manufacturing equipment. With the acquisition, SSIH managed to broaden its product range and got the machinery needed to produce quality products at a lower cost than before. In 1973, production ceased at the Langendorf production facilities, and the Lanco brand was relegated to the Aetos Watch Company, another sub-branch of SSIH. Since 1977, the old factory building in Langendorf has been a shopping centre.

Although SSIH was Switzerland's largest and the world's third largest producer of watches, the company suffered due to heavy competition. It went on to merge with ASUAG into SSIH/ASUAG Holding Company in 1983 – which was renamed SMH in 1986 and in 1988, became The Swatch Group.

== Products ==
=== Watches ===
From 1890, the main brand of the Langendorf Watch Company was "Langendorf", but the company produced watches and parts that were sold under many other brand names such as Aliada, Barracuda, Carex, Cavalier, Lancet, Stratford, Valogene and the most rare Piquette with AMKO branded movements.

Many of the watches were produced for export, and in order to avoid paying duties, many were cased inside the importing country, including the USA where Langendorf watches were imported by the American Swiss Watch Company from the beginning of the 20th century. The latter was reported out of business as of 1915.

During World War I and World War II, the Langendorf Watch Company was renowned for producing military and pilot watches of good quality for servicemen. There's an early wrist watch developed for World War I infantry officers to use in trenches. The 9XX movements from the 1930s and 1940s were very smooth running and were also used in army watches.

Many movements from the 1950s and 1960s have 12 or 13 lined movements, the "qualité exceptionelle" in chronometer standards. Lanco pocket watches are also of very good quality, and some include an alarm function.

=== Lanco ===
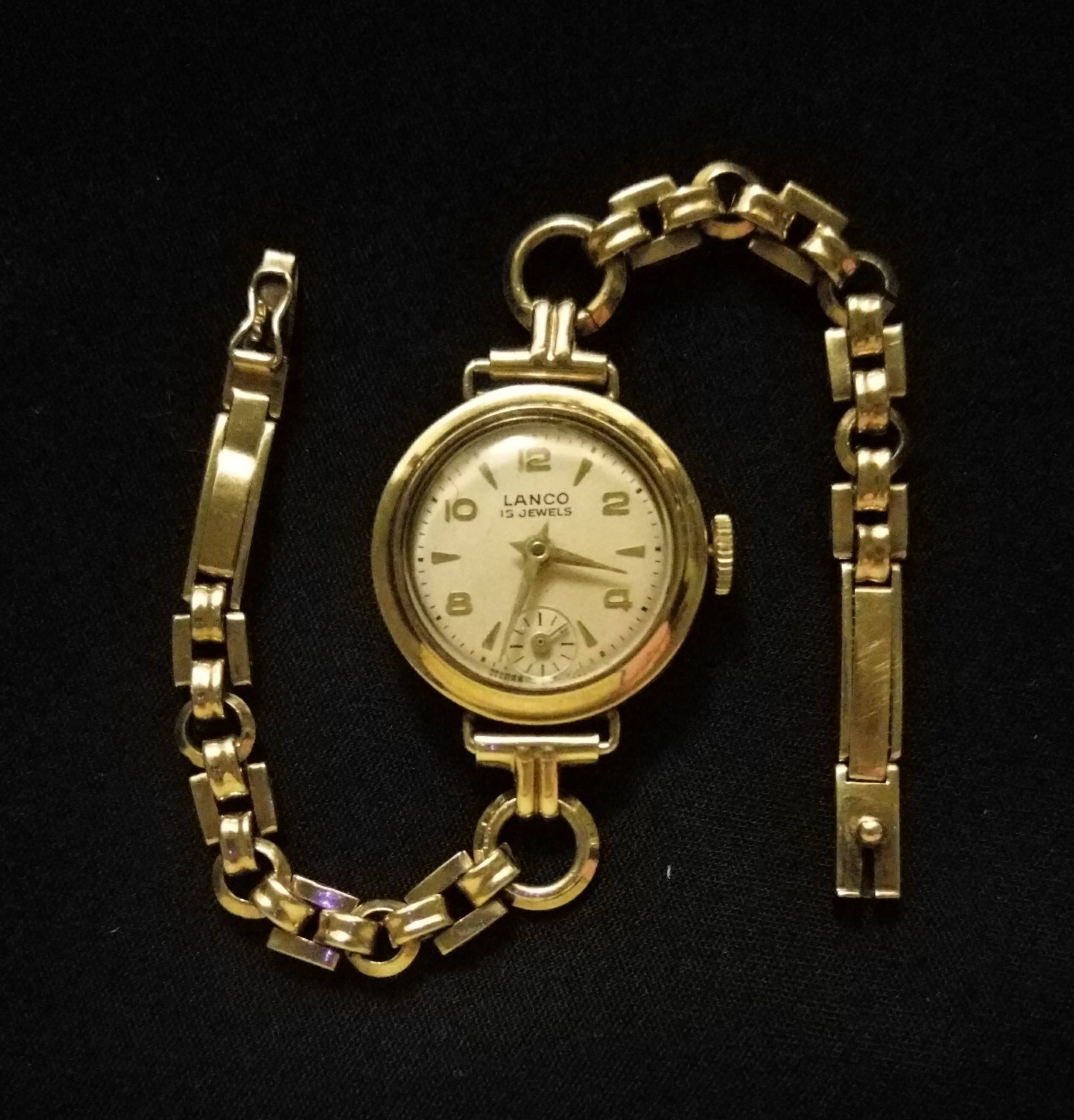

Watches bearing the "Lanco" brand were being manufactured and sold in the middle 1950s. The illustration to the right is of a Lanco ladies' watch given as a retirement present, engraved on the rear of its case with the date November 1956.

The brand soon became successful and known for fine craftsmanship and attention to detail. Lanco watches are still considered to be of very high quality, and they are traded today as vintage watches.

A number of Lanco watches are famous, such as the "Flying Saucer" or the "Lanco-Fon", a manual-wound watch with an alarm function that was released in the 1960s.

When Lanco was revived in the 1970s, more variety was added to the product line. It became a brand with room for innovation and experimentation, including into digital watches. Many of the 1970s watches were relatively large sized for their time and this makes them sought-after today. Watches from the 1970s such as "Club 77" and "Jump Hour" are also still quite popular.

After 1973, a number of movements from other suppliers were used for Lanco chronographs, the most famous calibers stemming from Valjoux and Angelus. A Lanco watch with the futuristic Tissot Astrolon movement (caliber 2250) was also produced in the 1970s.

During SSIH's financial problems in 1981, the Lanco brand name was sold. As of 1998, new Lanco watches are being sold in South Africa by S. Bacher & Company, under license from The Swatch Group.

== Literature ==
- "125 Jahre Uhrmacherschule im Kanton Solothurn" by Vuk Djurinović
- From Ebauches SA to ETA SA: 75 Years of Swiss Movements by Claude Girardin
- Watch-Wiki: Uhrenfabrik Langendorf SA
- Historisches Lexikon der Schweiz: Kottmann
- Wikipedia (German): Langendorf SO
- "Die industrielle Entwicklung des Kantons Solothurn und ihr Einfluss auf die Volkswirtschaft. Festschrift zum fünfzigjährigen Bestehen des solothurnischen Handels- und Industrievereins" by Fernand Schwab. Solothurn (1927).
- "Omega Saga" by Marco Richon. Adrien Brandt Foundation (1998).
- "Der Armbandwecker. Die Geschichte einer unterschätzten Komplikation" by Michael Philip Horlbeck and Arne Psille. Heel (2001). ISBN 3898800032.
- "Wristwatches" by Gisbert L. Brunner and Christian Pfeiffer-Belli. H.F. Ullmann (2008). ISBN 3833125594.
- "Swiss Timepiece Makers 1775-1975" by Kathleen H. Pritchard. Phoenix Pub (1997). ISBN 9780914659792.
