= Alberto Gallego (footballer) =

Spanish football manager

Personal information
- Full name: Alberto Gallego Laencuentra
- Date of birth: 16 March 1974 (age 52)
- Place of birth: Lleida, Spain
- Position: Midfielder

Team information
- Current team: Peña Deportiva (manager)

Youth career
- Lleida

Senior career*
Years	Team	Apps	(Gls)
- Binéfar
- Alcobendas
–2009	Benabarre		

Managerial career
- 2009–2012: Benabarre
- 2013–2014: EFAC Almacelles
- 2015–2016: Rayo Vallecano (youth)
- 2017–2018: New York Cosmos (assistant)
- 2018–2019: Pobla Mafumet
- 2020: Volos
- 2020–2021: Ibiza Islas Pitiusas
- 2021–2022: Recreativo
- 2022: Elche B
- 2022: Elche (interim)
- 2023–: Peña Deportiva
- * Club domestic league appearances and goals

Alberto Gallego Laencuentra (born 16 March 1974) is a Spanish retired footballer who played as a midfielder, and the manager of SCR Peña Deportiva.

Gallego was also a singer, and played under the name of Lanco.

== Career ==
Born in Lleida, Catalonia, Gallego represented CD Binéfar, Alcobendas CF and UD Benabarre as a player. After retiring with the latter in 2009, he was named manager, and helped the side to promote to the Regional Preferente in 2012.

In December 2012, Gallego resigned from his club to take over hometown side CE EFAC Almacelles, achieving promotion to Primera Catalana before leaving in 2014. In the 2015–16 season, he worked at Rayo Vallecano's staff while managing their Juvenil squad.

In 2016, Gallego moved abroad and joined Rayo OKC as their director of football. In February 2017, he moved to New York Cosmos and worked as an assistant manager before returning to Spain in June 2018, after being named in charge of Tercera División side CF Pobla de Mafumet.

On 5 January 2020, Gallego replaced compatriot Juan Ferrando at the helm of Super League Greece side Volos. He was sacked on 25 February, with the club seriously threatened with relegation, and was replaced by his assistant Stefanos Xirofotos.

On 24 July 2020, Gallego was appointed manager of CD Ibiza Islas Pitiusas in the fourth division. In June of the following year, after helping the side in their promotion to the new fourth tier, Segunda División RFEF, he left.

On 18 June 2021, Gallego was announced as manager of Recreativo de Huelva in Tercera División RFEF. He achieved promotion with the side after leading their group, but resigned on 13 April 2022, alleging "personal attacks".

On 22 June 2022, Gallego took over Elche CF's reserves also in the fifth division. On 5 October, he became the interim manager of the first team, after Francisco was sacked.

Gallego subsequently returned to his previous role after the appointment of Jorge Almirón, and left the reserves on a mutual agreement on 23 November 2022.

== Musical career ==
While playing football at Lleida, Gallego also composed songs and had guitar lessons at his home. In 1994, he sang at the Benidorm Song Festival under the name of Alberto 'Lanco', but later refused a musical career to pursue a football one. However, after fracturing his nose at Alcobendas, he would record two albums under the name of Lanco, until reaching the finals of the 2005 Eurovision Song Contest.

=== Discography ===
==== Albums ====
- Mi Mente (1999, Vamm Records)
- Amanece Pop (2004, O'Clock Music)
