= Georgios Korakakis =

Greek footballer and manager

Personal information
- Date of birth: 9 February 1976 (age 50)
- Height: 1.73 m (5 ft 8 in)
- Position: Midfielder

Team information
- Current team: Asteras Tripolis (assistant coach)

Youth career
- Agia Eleousa

Senior career*
| Years | Team | Apps | (Gls) |
| 1997–2001 | Agia Eleousa | 21 | (0) |
| 2001–2005 | Chalkidona | 105 | (8) |
| 2005–2008 | Atromitos | 79 | (11) |
| 2008–2009 | Diagoras | 45 | (4) |
| 2010–2011 | Ethnikos Piraeus | 47 | (4) |
| 2011–2013 | Elpidoforos Kifissias | 42 | (1) |
| Total | | 339 | (28) |

Managerial career
- 2014–2016: Atromitos (youth)
- 2016–2017: Atromitos
- 2017–2018: Kallithea
- 2019: Atromitos (caretaker)
- 2020–2021: Atromitos (assistant)
- 2022–2024: Atromitos (assistant)
- 2024: AEL Limassol (assistant)
- 2024–2025: OH Leuven (assistant)
- 2025–: Asteras Tripolis (assistant)
- * Club domestic league appearances and goals as of 18 September 2006 ‡ National team caps and goals as of 18 September 2006

Georgios Korakakis (Greek: Γεώργιος Κορακάκης; born 9 February 1976) is a Greek professional football manager and former player. He is currently the assistant coach of Super League club Asteras Tripolis.

== Playing career ==
He played mostly in Atromitos F.C. and Chalkidona. He had 261 appearances in the Super League Greece and Football League. On 14 September 2006, he was the first European Atromitos scorer in the match with Sevilla FC.

== Managerial career ==
On 18 June 2014, Georgios Korakakis, one of the most emblematic figures in the history of the club returned in Peristeri, as he took over the fortunes of Atromitos U20 for the 2014–15 season.

== Managerial statistics ==
As of match played 5 April 2017.

| Team | From | To | Record | | | | | |
| Team | From | To | M | W | D | L | Win % | Ref. |
|---|---|---|---|---|---|---|---|---|
| Atromitos | 25 September 2016 | Present | 32 | 13 | 7 | 12 | 40.63 | |
| Total | | | 32 | 13 | 7 | 12 | 40.63 | — |
