= Stefanos Xirofotos =

Greek footballer

Personal information
- Date of birth: 1 October 1975 (age 51)

Managerial career
- Years: Team
- 2014–2016: Pyrasos
- 2016: Niki Volos
- 2016–2017: Niki Volos
- 2017–2018: Niki Volos (assistant)
- 2018–2019: Sellana
- 2019–2020: Volos U19
- 2020: Volos (assistant)
- 2020: Volos
- 2020–2021: Olympiacos Volos
- 2021: Volos U19
- 2021–2022: Theseus Agrias
- 2022–2023: Niki Volos U19
- 2023: O.F. Ierapetra
- 2024–2025: Niki Volos
- 2025: Sarakinos Volos

Stefanos Xirofotos (Greek: Στέφανος Ξηροφώτος; born 1 October 1975) is a Greek professional football manager.

== Managerial statistics ==
Team	From	To	Record				
Team	From	To	G	W	D	L	Win %
Pyrasos	12 November 2014	11 April 2016	51	19	15	17	37.25
Niki Volos	24 April 2016	30 June 2016	3	1	1	1	33.33
Niki Volos	26 September 2016	30 June 2017	31	16	5	10	51.61
Sellana	21 December 2018	30 June 2019	14	6	3	5	42.86
Volos U19	1 July 2019	12 February 2020	20	5	3	12	25.00
Volos	25 February 2020	23 July 2020	8	1	1	6	12.50
Olympiacos Volos	16 September 2020	29 April 2021	8	4	0	4	50.00
Volos U19	1 October 2021	22 November 2021	5	0	3	2	0.00
Theseus Agrias	29 December 2021	21 January 2022	2	0	0	2	0.00
Niki Volos U19	10 September 2022	23 May 2023	12	10	1	1	83.33
O.F. Ierapetra	23 May 2023	30 June 2023	4	2	0	2	50.00
Niki Volos	9 August 2024	27 January 2025	19	5	8	6	26.32
Sarakinos Volos	7 October 2025	23 November 2025	7	2	2	3	28.57
Total			184	71	42	71	38.59
