= 2017–18 Super League Greece =

82nd season of top-tier football league in Greece

Super League Greece
- Season: 2017–18
- Dates: 19 August 2017 – 7 May 2018
- Champions: AEK Athens; 12th Greek title
- Relegated: Kerkyra; Platanias
- Champions League: AEK Athens; PAOK
- Europa League: Olympiacos; Atromitos; Asteras Tripolis
- Matches: 240
- Goals: 530 (2.21 per match)
- Top goalscorer: Aleksandar Prijović (19 goals)
- Biggest home win: PAOK 5–0 Levadiakos (6 January 2018)
- Biggest away win: Platanias 0–4 Olympiacos (11 March 2018)
- Highest scoring: Panionios 3–4 Olympiacos (14 October 2017); Apollon Smyrnis 4–3 PAS Giannina (5 November 2017)
- Highest attendance: 50,141; AEK Athens 2–0 Levadiakos (22 April 2018)
- Lowest attendance: 383; Atromitos 4–0 Kerkyra (5 May 2018)
- Total attendance: 949,247

The 2017–18 Super League Greece, or Souroti Super League for sponsorship reasons, was the 82nd season of the highest tier in league of Greek football and the 12th under its current name. The season started in August 2017 and ended in May 2018. The league comprises fourteen teams from the 2016–17 season and two promoted from the 2016–17 Football League.

On 12 March 2018, the Super League Greece was suspended by the Greek government until further notice after the president of PAOK, Ivan Savvidis, had stormed onto the pitch with a revolver during the match between PAOK and AEK Athens played the previous day. The suspension was lifted on 27 March. PAOK was deducted 3 points and AEK was awarded 3 points for the incident.

Contrary to the previous seasons, the playoffs for the Champions League and Europa League spots were removed, with qualification based solely on finishing position.

== Teams ==
Two teams were relegated from the 2016–17 season. Iraklis and Veria played in Football League for the 2017–18 season.

Two teams were promoted from the 2016–17 Football League, Apollon Smyrnis and Lamia, the latter for which it was their debut season in the highest division of Greek football.

Promoted from 2016–17 Football League	Relegated from 2016–17 Super League Greece
Apollon Smyrnis; Lamia	Iraklis; Veria

=== Stadiums and locations ===
Location of the 2017–18 Super League Greece teams

Club	Location	Venue	Capacity	2016–17
AEK Athens	Athens (Marousi)	Athens Olympic Stadium	69,618	2nd
AEL	Larissa	AEL FC Arena	16,118	13th
Apollon Smyrnis	Athens (Rizoupoli)	Georgios Kamaras Stadium	14,856	1st (FL)
Asteras Tripolis	Tripoli	Theodoros Kolokotronis Stadium	7,616	12th
Atromitos	Athens (Peristeri)	Peristeri Stadium	10,005	8th
Kerkyra	Corfu	Kerkyra Stadium	3,000	10th
Lamia	Lamia	Lamia Municipal Stadium	6,000	2nd (FL)
Levadiakos	Livadeia	Levadia Municipal Stadium	6,500	14th
Olympiacos	Piraeus	Karaiskakis Stadium	32,115	1st
Panathinaikos	Athens (Ampelokipoi)	Leoforos Alexandras Stadium	16,003	3rd
Panetolikos	Agrinio	Panetolikos Stadium	7,000	11th
Panionios	Athens (Nea Smyrni)	Nea Smyrni Stadium	11,700	5th
PAOK	Thessaloniki	Toumba Stadium	28,703	4th
PAS Giannina	Ioannina	Zosimades Stadium	7,652	9th
Platanias	Chania	Perivolia Municipal Stadium	4,000	7th
Xanthi	Xanthi	Xanthi FC Arena	7,422	6th

=== Personnel and kits ===
Note: Flags indicate national team as has been defined under FIFA eligibility rules. Players and Managers may hold more than one non-FIFA nationality.

Team	Head coach	Captain	Kit manufacturer	Shirt sponsor
AEK Athens	(Spain) Manolo Jiménez	(Greece) Petros Mantalos	Nike	Pame Stoixima
AEL	(Greece) Sotiris Antoniou	(Greece) Thomas Nazlidis	Legea	
Apollon Smyrnis	(Greece) Georgios Paraschos	(Greece) Georgios Dasios	Joma	Venetis Bakery
Asteras Tripolis	(Greece) Savvas Pantelidis	(Argentina) Matías Iglesias	Macron	Stoiximan.GR
Atromitos	(Austria) Damir Canadi	(Greece) Kyriakos Kivrakidis	Nike	Tzoker
Kerkyra	(Greece) Giannis Matzourakis	(Greece) Anastasios Venetis	Macron	
Lamia	(Greece) Babis Tennes	(Greece) Vangelis Pitkas	Nike	
Levadiakos	(France) José Anigo	(Greece) Theodoros Tripotseris	Legea	
Olympiacos	(Greece) Christos Kontis	(Spain) Alberto Botía	Adidas	Stoiximan.GR
Panathinaikos	(Greece) Marinos Ouzounidis	(Greece) Dimitrios Kourbelis	Nike	Pame Stoixima
Panetolikos	(Greece) Traianos Dellas	(Greece) Dimitris Kyriakidis	Legea	Pame Stoixima
Panionios	(Greece) Michalis Grigoriou	(Greece) Panagiotis Korbos	Luanvi	Stoiximan.GR
PAOK	(Romania) Răzvan Lucescu	(Portugal) Vieirinha	Macron	Stoiximan.GR
PAS Giannina	(Greece) Giannis Petrakis	(Greece) Alexios Michail	Nike	Vikos Cola / Car.gr
Platanias	(Greece) Giannis Chatzinikolaou	(Brazil) Vanderson	Luanvi	Ergobeton
Xanthi	(Serbia) Milan Rastavac	(Greece) Konstantinos Fliskas	Joma	Pame Stoixima

=== Managerial changes ===
Team	Outgoing manager	Manner of departure	Date of vacancy	Position in table	Incoming manager	Date of appointment
PAOK	(Serbia) Vladimir Ivić	Mutual consent	9 June 2017	Pre-season	(Serbia) Aleksandar Stanojević	16 June 2017
Atromitos	(Portugal) Ricardo Sá Pinto	Mutual consent	12 June 2017	Pre-season	(Austria) Damir Canadi	21 June 2017
Panionios	(Serbia) Vladan Milojević	End of contract	30 June 2017	Pre-season	(Greece) Michalis Grigoriou	1 June 2017
Olympiacos	(Greece) Takis Lemonis	End of contract	30 June 2017	Pre-season	(Kosovo) Besnik Hasi	8 June 2017
Xanthi	(Romania) Răzvan Lucescu	End of contract	30 June 2017	Pre-season	(Serbia) Milan Rastavac	12 June 2017
PAOK	(Serbia) Aleksandar Stanojević	Sacked	11 August 2017	Pre-season	(Romania) Răzvan Lucescu	11 August 2017
Kerkyra	(Greece) Dimitrios Eleftheropoulos	Sacked	22 August 2017	14th	(Greece) Kostas Christoforakis (caretaker)	22 August 201
Kerkyra	(Greece) Kostas Christoforakis (caretaker)	End of tenure as caretaker	28 August 2017	16th	(Greece) Alekos Vosniadis	28 August 2017
Asteras Tripolis	(Greece) Staikos Vergetis	Sacked	10 September 2017	13th	(Greece) Savvas Pantelidis	10 September 2017
AEL	(Netherlands) André Paus	Sacked	12 September 2017	15th	(Belgium) Jacky Mathijssen	14 September 2017
Olympiacos	(Kosovo) Besnik Hasi	Sacked	25 September 2017	4th	(Greece) Takis Lemonis	25 September 2017
AEL	(Belgium) Jacky Mathijssen	Sacked	25 September 2017	15th	(Greece) Ilias Fyntanis	25 September 2017
Apollon Smyrnis	(Greece) Akis Mantzios	Sacked	25 September 2017	16th	(Croatia) Zoran Vulić	28 September 2017
Platanias	(Greece) Georgios Paraschos	Sacked	31 October 2017	16th	(Greece) Nikolaos Manarolis (caretaker)	31 October 2017
Platanias	(Greece) Nikolaos Manarolis (caretaker)	End of tenure as caretaker	12 November 2017	16th	(Spain) José Manuel Roca	12 November 2017
Apollon Smyrnis	(Croatia) Zoran Vulić	Sacked	11 December 2017	14th	(Greece) Georgios Paraschos	12 December 2017
Kerkyra	(Greece) Alekos Vosniadis	Sacked	19 December 2017	15th	(Greece) Sakis Tsiolis	27 December 2017
Olympiacos	(Greece) Takis Lemonis	Sacked	4 January 2018	1st	(Greece) Christos Kontis (caretaker)	4 January 2018
Olympiacos	(Greece) Christos Kontis (caretaker)	End of tenure as caretaker	8 January 2018	1st	(Spain) Óscar García	8 January 2018
Panetolikos	(Greece) Makis Chavos	Sacked	7 January 2018	13th	(Greece) Traianos Dellas	12 January 2018
Kerkyra	(Greece) Sakis Tsiolis	Sacked	22 January 2018	15th	(Greece) Giannis Matzourakis	25 January 2018
Platanias	(Spain) José Manuel Roca	Sacked	29 January 2018	16th	(Greece) Giannis Chatzinikolaou	31 January 2018
AEL	(Greece) Ilias Fyntanis	Sacked	20 February 2018	12th	(Serbia) Ratko Dostanić	20 February 2018
AEL	(Serbia) Ratko Dostanić	Sacked	10 March 2018	12th	(Greece) Sotiris Antoniou	12 March 2018
Olympiacos	(Spain) Óscar García	Resigned	3 April 2018	3rd	(Greece) Christos Kontis (caretaker)	3 April 2018

== League table ==
Pos	Team	Pld	W	D	L	GF	GA	GD	Pts	Qualification or relegation
1	AEK Athens (C)	30	21	7	2	50	12	+38	70	Qualification for the Champions League third qualifying round
2	PAOK	30	21	4	5	59	19	+40	64 (Note: PAOK were deducted 3 points by court decision.)	Qualification for the Champions League second qualifying round
3	Olympiacos	30	18	6	6	63	28	+35	57 (Note: Olympiacos were deducted 3 points due to crowd behavior against AEK on 4 February 2018.)	Qualification for the Europa League third qualifying round
4	Atromitos	30	15	11	4	43	21	+22	56	Qualification for the Europa League second qualifying round
5	Asteras Tripolis	30	12	9	9	39	24	+15	45 (Note: Head-to-head points: Asteras Tripolis 2, Xanthi 2.)	Qualification for the Europa League second qualifying round
6	Xanthi	30	12	9	9	31	30	+1	45	
7	Panionios	30	10	10	10	32	31	+1	40	
8	Panetolikos	30	9	8	13	31	40	−9	35	
9	PAS Giannina	30	7	13	10	31	34	−3	34 (Note: Head-to-head points: Levadiakos 2, PAS Giannina 2.)	
10	Levadiakos	30	8	10	12	23	34	−11	34	
11	Panathinaikos	30	10	10	10	30	30	0	32 (Note: Panathinaikos were deducted 2 points due to crowd behavior against PAOK in a play-off match during the 2016–17 season. Panathinaikos were deducted 3 points for financial reasons on 11 April 2018. On 23 April 2018 another 3 points were deducted for the same occasion.)	
12	AEL	30	7	10	13	22	41	−19	31	
13	Lamia	30	6	12	12	20	34	−14	30	
14	Apollon Smyrnis	30	6	11	13	23	36	−13	29	
15	Kerkyra (R)	30	4	10	16	19	51	−32	22	Relegation to Football League
16	Platanias (R)	30	2	4	24	14	65	−51	10	Relegation to Football League

Source: Super League Greece
Rules for classification: 1) Points; 2) Head-to-head points; 3) Head-to-head goal difference; 4) Goals scored; 5) Goals against; 6) Play-offs (neutral ground); 7) Draw.
(Note: Criteria 6 is only used if needed to decide champion, teams for relegation or teams for UEFA competitions).
(C) Champions; (R) Relegated

== Results ==
Home \ Away	AEK	AEL	APS	AST	ATR	KER	LAM	LEV	OLY	PAO	PNE	PGSS	PAOK	PAS	PLA	XAN
AEK Athens	—	4–0	0–0	1–0	0–1	3–1	2–0	2–0	3–2	3–0	2–0	1–0	1–0	3–1	3–0	4–0
AEL	0–0	—	1–0	1–1	0–0	0–0	1–1	1–0	0–3	0–1	4–2	0–0	1–1	1–1	1–0	1–0
Apollon Smyrnis	0–1	3–0	—	1–3	0–3	0–0	1–1	1–1	1–0	0–0	2–1	1–1	0–0	4–3	0–1	2–0
Asteras Tripolis	2–0	3–1	2–1	—	0–1	4–0	1–3	2–0	1–1	1–0	0–0	0–1	3–2	1–2	4–0	1–1
Atromitos	1–1	1–0	1–1	1–0	—	4–0	3–0	1–0	2–2	1–1	0–1	0–0	0–2	0–0	4–1	1–0
Kerkyra	0–0	1–1	2–0	1–3	1–3	—	0–0	1–1	1–3	1–0	1–0	0–1	0–3	1–1	2–0	0–2
Lamia	0–1	0–2	0–0	1–0	1–1	1–1	—	1–1	0–1	1–1	2–2	1–0	0–2	2–1	2–0	0–1
Levadiakos	0–2	2–1	2–1	1–0	0–1	2–0	0–0	—	1–1	3–2	1–2	2–1	0–0	1–1	1–1	1–0
Olympiacos	1–2	4–1	3–1	1–1	0–1	5–1	2–0	2–1	—	1–1	4–0	1–0	1–0	1–0	5–1	3–0
Panathinaikos	1–1	2–1	1–0	1–1	1–0	4–0	2–0	0–0	1–0	—	0–0	0–1	0–3	2–0	2–0	1–2
Panetolikos	1–4	3–1	1–1	0–2	2–2	1–0	1–0	0–1	1–4	2–0	—	1–1	0–1	1–0	3–0	1–3
Panionios	0–1	4–1	2–0	0–0	2–2	3–1	1–0	2–0	3–4	0–3	1–1	—	2–2	0–1	2–1	0–0
PAOK	0–3 (Note: Match suspended at 90th minute (score: 1–0). Awarded 0–3 to AEK.)	3–0	3–0	2–0	2–1	3–1	4–0	5–0	0–3 (Note: Match suspended before the kick-off. Awarded 0–3 to Olympiacos.)	4–0	1–0	3–1	—	1–0	3–0	2–1
PAS Giannina	0–0	0–0	0–1	0–0	2–2	2–1	1–1	0–0	3–0	2–1	1–1	1–1	1–3	—	3–1	1–1
Platanias	0–1	0–1	1–1	0–3	1–3	0–0	1–2	1–0	0–4	1–1	0–3	1–2	0–1	0–3	—	0–2
Xanthi	1–1	1–0	2–0	0–0	0–2	1–1	0–0	2–1	1–1	1–1	1–0	2–0	0–3	3–0	3–2	—

Source: Super League Greece
Legend: Blue = home team win; Yellow = draw; Red = away team win.
For upcoming matches, an "a" indicates there is an article about the rivalry between the two participants.

=== Positions by round ===
The table lists the positions of teams after each week of matches. In order to preserve chronological evolvements, any postponed matches are not included in the round at which they were originally scheduled, but added to the full round they were played immediately afterwards.

Team ╲ Round	1	2	3	4	5	6	7	8	9	10	11	12	13	14	15	16	17	18	19	20	21	22	23	24	25	26	27	28	29	30
AEK Athens	2	3	1	1	1	1	2	3	3	2	3	1	1	1	2	2	2	3	3	2	2	2	2	1	1	1	1	1	1	1
PAOK	10	5	5	4	3	2	1	2	2	3	1	3	3	3	3	3	3	2	1	1	1	1	1	2	2	2	2	2	2	2
Olympiacos	1	1	2	2	4	7	5	4	4	4	4	2	2	2	1	1	1	1	2	3	3	3	3	3	3	3	3	3	3	3
Atromitos	6	7	8	8	5	4	3	1	1	1	2	4	4	4	4	4	4	4	4	4	4	4	4	4	4	4	4	4	4	4
Asteras Tripolis	12	9	14	13	14	13	14	15	15	15	12	7	6	6	6	6	6	6	7	7	7	8	9	7	5	5	6	5	5	5
Xanthi	9	6	4	7	7	6	7	8	10	8	5	5	7	9	9	7	7	7	5	5	6	6	5	5	6	6	5	6	6	6
Panionios	4	2	3	3	2	3	6	5	5	5	6	6	5	5	5	5	5	5	6	6	5	5	6	6	7	7	8	10	7	7
Panetolikos	15	12	11	15	10	8	10	11	12	14	14	12	12	13	13	13	12	11	12	12	11	10	10	10	8	8	9	7	8	8
PAS Giannina	3	4	6	5	8	11	9	9	8	9	9	9	8	8	10	10	11	13	9	10	8	7	8	9	11	11	11	11	11	9
Levadiakos	8	8	9	6	6	5	4	6	6	6	7	10	11	12	8	11	8	10	11	8	9	11	11	11	10	10	7	9	9	10
Panathinaikos	16	15	16	11	13	10	8	7	7	7	8	8	9	11	11	9	10	8	8	9	10	9	7	8	9	9	10	8	10	11
AEL	13	10	15	14	16	15	16	13	13	13	11	13	13	7	7	8	9	9	10	11	12	12	12	12	12	12	12	12	12	12
Lamia	7	11	7	9	12	9	11	12	9	10	10	11	10	10	12	12	13	12	13	13	13	13	13	13	13	14	14	14	14	13
Apollon Smyrnis	5	13	13	16	15	16	15	16	14	12	15	14	14	14	14	14	14	14	14	14	14	15	15	15	14	13	13	13	13	14
Kerkyra	14	16	10	10	11	14	12	10	11	11	13	15	15	15	15	15	15	15	15	15	15	14	14	14	15	15	15	15	15	15
Platanias	11	14	12	12	9	12	13	14	16	16	16	16	16	16	16	16	16	16	16	16	16	16	16	16	16	16	16	16	16	16

Champion and Champions League third qualifying round
Champions League second qualifying round
Europa League third qualifying round
Europa League second qualifying round
Relegation to 2018–19 Football League

Source: Super League Greece

== Season statistics ==
=== Top scorers ===
Rank	Player	Club	Goals
1	(Serbia) Aleksandar Prijović	PAOK	19
2	(Iran) Karim Ansarifard	Olympiacos	17
3	(Spain) Pedro Conde	PAS Giannina	14
4	(Greece) Michalis Manias	Asteras Tripolis	12
6	(Argentina) Sergio Araujo	AEK Athens	11
6	(Slovakia) Erik Jendrišek	Xanthi	11
8	(Greece) Kostas Fortounis	Olympiacos	10
8	(France) Nicolas Diguiny	Atromitos	10
10	(France) Abiola Dauda	Atromitos	9
10	(Romania) Vlad Morar	Panetolikos	9

=== Top assists ===
Rank	Player	Club	Assists
1	(Greece) Kostas Fortounis	Olympiacos	9
3	(Spain) David Nadales	PAS Giannina / Apollon Smyrnis	8
3	(Greece) Dimitris Giannoulis	Atromitos	8
7	(France) Nicolas Diguiny	Atromitos	7
7	(Egypt) Amr Warda	Atromitos	7
7	(Greece) Dimitrios Pelkas	PAOK	7
7	(Portugal) Vieirinha	PAOK	7

== Awards ==
=== MVP and Best Goal Awards ===
Matchday	MVP	Best Goal	Ref
1st	(Greece) Kostas Fortounis (Olympiacos)		
2nd	(Greece) Lazaros Lamprou (Panionios)	(Nigeria) Abiola Dauda (Atromitos)	
3rd	(Greece) Petros Mantalos (AEK Athens)		
4th	(Israel) Omri Altman (Panathinaikos)	(Serbia) Aleksandar Prijović (PAOK)	
5th	(Greece) Lazaros Christodoulopoulos (AEK Athens)		
6th	(Greece) Nikolaos Papadopoulos (Lamia)	(Greece) Petros Giakoumakis (Levadiakos)	
7th	(Sweden) Oscar Hiljemark (Panathinaikos)	(Greece) Bruno Chalkiadakis (PAS Giannina)	
8th	(Senegal) Pape Abou Cissé (Olympiacos)	(Nigeria) Abiola Dauda (Atromitos)	
9th	(Brazil) Maurício (PAOK)		
10th	(Croatia) Marko Livaja (AEK Athens)	(Spain) Alberto Botía (Olympiacos)	
11th	(Croatia) Marko Livaja (AEK Athens)	(Romania) Vlad Morar (Panetolikos)	
12th	(Croatia) Marko Livaja (AEK Athens)	(Argentina) Franco Mazurek (Panetolikos)	
13th	(Croatia) Marko Livaja (AEK Athens)	(Greece) Theodoros Vasilakakis (Atromitos)	
14th	(Greece) Dimitrios Pelkas (PAOK)		
15th	(Germany) Marko Marin (Olympiacos)	(Greece) Theodoros Vasilakakis (Atromitos)	
16th	(Greece) Anastasios Bakasetas (AEK Athens)		
17th	(Greece) Dimitris Kyriakidis (Panetolikos)	(Brazil) Farley Rosa (Panetolikos)	
18th	(Iran) Karim Ansarifard (Olympiacos)	(Greece) Lazaros Lamprou (Panionios)	
19th	(Brazil) Thuram (Kerkyra)	(Greece) Lazaros Christodoulopoulos (AEK Athens)	
20th	(Greece) Giorgos Giakoumakis (AEK Athens)		
21st	(Spain) Pedro Conde (PAS Giannina)		
22nd	(Bosnia and Herzegovina) Ognjen Vranješ (AEK Athens)	(Spain) Pedro Conde (PAS Giannina)	
23rd	(Egypt) Amr Warda (Atromitos)		
24th	(Argentina) Walter Iglesias (Asteras Tripolis)	(Greece) Apostolos Skondras (PAS Giannina)	
25th	(Finland) Robin Lod (Panathinaikos)		
26th	(Argentina) Sergio Araujo (AEK Athens)		
27th	(Slovakia) Erik Jendrišek (Xanthi)		
28th	(Greece) Anastasios Bakasetas (AEK Athens)	(Netherlands) Diego Biseswar (PAOK)	
29th	(Serbia) Aleksandar Prijović (PAOK)	(Spain) Piti (Lamia)	
30th	(Spain) Pedro Conde (PAS Giannina)		

=== Annual awards ===
Annual awards were announced on 15 February 2019.

Award	Winner	Club
Greek Player of the Season	(Greece) Lazaros Christodoulopoulos	AEK Athens
Foreign Player of the Season	(Egypt) Amr Warda	Atromitos
Young Player of the Season	(Greece) Anastasios Douvikas	Asteras Tripolis
Goalkeeper of the Season	(Greece) Andreas Gianniotis	Atromitos
Fair Play of the Season	(Greece) Thomas Nazlidis	AEL
Golden Boot	(Serbia) Aleksandar Prijović	PAOK
Manager of the Season	(Spain) Manolo Jiménez	AEK Athens

Team of the Season
Goalkeeper	(Greece) Andreas Gianniotis (Atromitos)			
Defence	(Brazil) Léo Matos (PAOK)	(Ukraine) Dmytro Chyhrynskyi (AEK Athens)	(Cape Verde) Fernando Varela (PAOK)	(Greece) Dimitris Giannoulis (Atromitos) / (Portugal) Vieirinha (PAOK)
Midfield	(Egypt) Amr Warda (Atromitos)	(Greece) Dimitrios Kourbelis (Panathinaikos)	(Portugal) André Simões (AEK Athens)	(Greece) Lazaros Christodoulopoulos (AEK Athens)
Attack	(Iran) Karim Ansarifard (Olympiacos)		(Croatia) Marko Livaja (AEK Athens)	

== Attendances ==
Olympiacos drew the highest average home attendance in the 2017–18 edition of the Super League Greece.

#	Team	Total attendance	Average attendance
1	Olympiacos	210,245	19,113
2	PAOK	118,643	16,949
3	AEK Athens	118,304	15,609
4	Panathinaikos	92,271	6,948
5	AEL	57,994	3,866
6	Panetolikos	36,302	2,420
7	PAS Giannina	34,592	2,306
8	Lamia	29,109	1,941
9	Asteras Tripolis	27,634	1,842
10	Apollon Smyrnis	26,640	1,776
11	Platanias	25,860	1,724
12	Panionios	25,724	1,715
13	Xanthi	23,359	1,557
14	Kerkyra	17,854	1,190
15	Levadiakos	17,340	1,156
16	Atromitos	13,180	879
