= 2016–17 Super League Greece =

81st season of top-tier football league in Greece

Super League Greece
- Season: 2016–17
- Dates: 10 September 2016 – 30 April 2017
- Champions: Olympiacos; 44th Greek title
- Relegated: Iraklis; Veria
- Champions League: Olympiacos; AEK Athens
- Europa League: PAOK; Panathinaikos; Panionios
- Matches: 240
- Goals: 556 (2.32 per match)
- Top goalscorer: Marcus Berg (22 goals)
- Biggest home win: AEK Athens 6–0 Veria (5 February 2017)
- Biggest away win: Kerkyra 0–5 PAOK (17 December 2016); Asteras Tripolis 0–5 Panathinaikos (18 February 2017)
- Highest scoring: Olympiacos 6–1 Veria (11 September 2016); PAOK 3–4 Atromitos (28 November 2016); Veria 4–3 Asteras Tripolis (23 April 2017)
- Highest attendance: 31,283; Olympiacos 3–0 Panathinaikos (6 November 2016)
- Lowest attendance: 245; Veria 0–4 Xanthi (17 December 2016)
- Total attendance: 1,006,530

The 2016–17 Super League Greece was the 81st season of the highest tier in league of Greek football and the eleventh under its current title. The season started on 10 September 2016 and ended in June 2017. The league comprised fourteen teams from the 2015–16 season and two promoted from the 2015–16 Football League.

== Teams ==
Two teams were relegated from the 2015–16 season. Panthrakikos and AEL Kalloni would play in Football League for the 2016–17 season.

Two teams were promoted from the 2015–16 Football League, champions AEL and Kerkyra.

Promoted from 2015–16 Football League	Relegated from 2015–16 Super League Greece
Panthrakikos; AEL Kalloni	AEL; Kerkyra

=== Stadiums and locations ===
Location of the 2016–17 Super League Greece teams

Club	Location	Venue	Capacity	2015–16
AEK Athens	Athens (Marousi)	Athens Olympic Stadium	69,638	4th
AEL	Larissa	AEL FC Arena	16,118	1st (FL)
Asteras Tripolis	Tripoli	Theodoros Kolokotronis Stadium	7,616	7th
Atromitos	Athens (Peristeri)	Peristeri Stadium	10,005	8th
Iraklis	Thessaloniki (Triandria)	Kaftanzoglio Stadium	27,560	12th
Kerkyra	Corfu	Kerkyra Stadium	3,000	2nd (FL)
Levadiakos	Livadeia	Levadia Municipal Stadium	6,500	10th
Olympiacos	Piraeus	Karaiskakis Stadium	32,115	1st
Panathinaikos	Athens (Ampelokipoi)	Leoforos Alexandras Stadium	16,003	3rd
Panetolikos	Agrinio	Panetolikos Stadium	7,000	11th
Panionios	Athens (Nea Smyrni)	Nea Smyrni Stadium	11,700	5th
PAOK	Thessaloniki (Toumba)	Toumba Stadium	28,703	2nd
PAS Giannina	Ioannina	Zosimades Stadium	7,652	6th
Platanias	Chania	Perivolia Municipal Stadium	4,000	9th
Veria	Veria	Veria Stadium	6,500	14th
Xanthi	Xanthi	Xanthi FC Arena	7,422	13th

=== Personnel and kits ===
Note: Flags indicate national team as has been defined under FIFA eligibility rules. Players and Managers may hold more than one non-FIFA nationality.

Team	Head coach	Captain	Kit manufacturer	Shirt sponsor
AEK Athens	(Spain) Manolo Jiménez	(Greece) Petros Mantalos	Nike	Pame Stoixima
AEL	(Netherlands) André Paus	(Serbia) Boki Jovanović	Legea	
Asteras Tripolis	(Greece) Staikos Vergetis	(Argentina) Pablo Mazza	Nike	Stoiximan.GR
Atromitos	(Portugal) Ricardo Sá Pinto	(Brazil) Luiz Brito	Nike	Tzoker
Iraklis	(Greece) Savvas Pantelidis	(Greece) Lefteris Intzoglou	Givova	
Kerkyra	(Greece) Kostas Christoforakis	(Greece) Anastasios Venetis	Macron	Pame Stoixima
Levadiakos	(Greece) Dimitris Farantos	(Greece) Thanasis Moulopoulos	Legea	Tzoker
Olympiacos	(Greece) Takis Lemonis	(Argentina) Alejandro Domínguez	Adidas	Stoiximan.GR
Panathinaikos	(Greece) Marinos Ouzounidis	(Portugal) Zeca	Puma	Pame Stihima
Panetolikos	(Greece) Makis Chavos	(Greece) Georgios Kousas	Legea	Pame Stoixima
Panionios	(Serbia) Vladan Milojević	(Greece) Panagiotis Korbos	Luanvi	Stoiximan.GR
PAOK	(Serbia) Vladimir Ivić	(Greece) Stefanos Athanasiadis	Macron	Sportingbet
PAS Giannina	(Greece) Giannis Petrakis	(Greece) Alexios Michail	Nike	Tzoker
Platanias	(Greece) Georgios Paraschos	(Greece) Fanouris Goundoulakis	Macron	Pame Stoixima
Veria	(Serbia) Ratko Dostanić	(Greece) Stelios Marangos	Givova	Tzoker
Xanthi	(Romania) Răzvan Lucescu	(Greece) Konstantinos Fliskas	Joma	Pame Stoixima

=== Managerial changes ===
Team	Outgoing manager	Manner of departure	Date of vacancy	Position in table	Incoming manager	Date of appointment
AEK Athens	(Greece) Stelios Manolas (caretaker)	End of tenure as caretaker	25 May 2016	Pre-season	(Georgia (country)) Temur Ketsbaia	6 June 2016
Levadiakos	(Greece) Dimitris Farantos (caretaker)	End of tenure as caretaker	28 May 2016	Pre-season	(Serbia) Ratko Dostanić	6 June 2016
Kerkyra	(Greece) Alekos Vosniadis	Sacked	31 May 2016	Pre-season	(Greece) Michalis Grigoriou	4 June 2016
Olympiacos	(Portugal) Marco Silva	Resigned	3 June 2016	Pre-season	(Spain) Víctor Sánchez	23 June 2016
Veria	(Greece) Dimitrios Eleftheropoulos	Resigned	8 July 2016	Pre-season	(Greece) Alekos Vosniadis	9 July 2016
Olympiacos	(Spain) Víctor Sánchez	Sacked	10 August 2016	Pre-season	(Portugal) Paulo Bento	10 August 2016
Panionios	(Greece) Marinos Ouzounidis	Sacked	8 August 2016	Pre-season	(Serbia) Vladan Milojević	11 August 2016
Atromitos	(Greece) Traianos Dellas	Sacked	19 September 2016	16th	(Greece) Georgios Korakakis	19 September 2016
Veria	(Greece) Alekos Vosniadis	Sacked	23 September 2016	15th	(Greece) Thomas Grafas	24 September 2016
Asteras Tripolis	(Greece) Makis Chavos	Sacked	26 September 2016	16th	(Greece) Dimitrios Eleftheropoulos	27 September 2016
AEK Athens	(Georgia (country)) Temur Ketsbaia	Sacked	18 October 2016	3rd	(Portugal) José Morais	18 October 2016
Iraklis	(Greece) Nikos Papadopoulos	Sacked	18 October 2016	16th	(Greece) Ioannis Amanatidis (caretaker)	19 October 2016
Iraklis	(Greece) Ioannis Amanatidis (caretaker)	End of tenure as caretaker	30 October 2016	16th	(Greece) Savvas Pantelidis	1 November 2016
AEL	(Greece) Kostas Matzokas (caretaker)	End of tenure as caretaker	1 November 2016	11th	(Greece) Sakis Tsiolis	1 November 2016
Panathinaikos	(Italy) Andrea Stramaccioni	Sacked	1 December 2016	3rd	(Greece) Marinos Ouzounidis	1 December 2016
Levadiakos	(Serbia) Ratko Dostanić	Sacked	12 January 2017	14th	(Greece) Giannis Christopoulos	12 January 2017
Panetolikos	(Greece) Giannis Matzourakis	Sacked	17 January 2017	11th	(Greece) Giannis Dalakouras (caretaker)	17 January 2017
AEK Athens	(Portugal) José Morais	Sacked	18 January 2017	6th	(Spain) Manolo Jiménez	19 January 2017
Panetolikos	(Greece) Giannis Dalakouras (caretaker)	End of tenure as caretaker	19 January 2017	11th	(Greece) Makis Chavos	19 January 2017
Veria	(Greece) Thomas Grafas	Sacked	26 January 2017	14th	(Greece) Apostolos Terzis	26 January 2017
Atromitos	(Greece) Georgios Korakakis	Sacked	5 February 2017	9th	(Portugal) Ricardo Sá Pinto	6 February 2017
Veria	(Greece) Apostolos Terzis	Sacked	14 February 2017	16th	(Serbia) Ratko Dostanić	14 February 2017
Asteras Tripolis	(Greece) Dimitrios Eleftheropoulos	Sacked	18 February 2017	12th	(Greece) Apostolos Charalampidis (caretaker)	20 February 2017
Olympiacos	(Portugal) Paulo Bento	Sacked	6 March 2017	1st	(Greece) Vasilis Vouzas (caretaker)	6 March 2017
Asteras Tripolis	(Greece) Apostolos Charalampidis (caretaker)	End of tenure as caretaker	20 February 2017	13th	(Greece) Staikos Vergetis	3 March 2017
AEL	(Greece) Sakis Tsiolis	Resigned	21 March 2017	12th	(Greece) Theodoros Voutiritsas (caretaker)	21 March 2017
Olympiacos	(Greece) Vasilis Vouzas (caretaker)	End of tenure as caretaker	23 March 2017	1st	(Greece) Takis Lemonis	23 March 2017
AEL	(Greece) Theodoros Voutiritsas (caretaker)	End of tenure as caretaker	3 Αpril 2017	12th	(Netherlands) André Paus	3 April 2017
Levadiakos	(Greece) Giannis Christopoulos	Sacked	7 Αpril 2017	14th	(Greece) Dimitris Farantos (caretaker)	7 April 2017
Kerkyra	(Greece) Michalis Grigoriou	Sacked	11 April 2017	11th	(Greece) Kostas Christoforakis (caretaker)	12 April 2017

== Regular season ==
=== League table ===
Pos	Team	Pld	W	D	L	GF	GA	GD	Pts	Qualification or relegation
1	Olympiacos (C)	30	21	4	5	57	16	+41	67	Qualification for the Champions League third qualifying round
2	PAOK (Note: PAOK were deducted three points as they did not show up to the second semi-final match against Olympiacos in last year's Greek Cup.)	30	20	4	6	52	19	+33	61	Qualification for the Play-offs
3	Panathinaikos	30	16	9	5	45	19	+26	57	Qualification for the Play-offs
4	AEK Athens	30	14	11	5	54	23	+31	53	Qualification for the Play-offs
5	Panionios	30	15	7	8	35	23	+12	52	Qualification for the Play-offs
6	Xanthi	30	13	9	8	34	25	+9	48	
7	Platanias	30	11	9	10	34	38	−4	42	
8	Atromitos	30	11	6	13	29	38	−9	39	
9	PAS Giannina	30	8	12	10	30	37	−7	36	
10	Kerkyra	30	8	8	14	22	43	−21	32	
11	Panetolikos	30	8	7	15	29	40	−11	31	
12	Asteras Tripolis	30	6	10	14	34	49	−15	28 (Note: Head-to-head points: Asteras Tripolis 4, AEL 1.)	
13	AEL	30	6	10	14	23	42	−19	28	
14	Levadiakos	30	6	8	16	27	49	−22	26	
15	Iraklis (Note: Iraklis were initially relegated to Football League due to the financial problems. However, the team decided not to participate in the second tier Football League, and play in the third tier Gamma Ethniki instead with the amateur team.) (R)	30	6	11	13	28	39	−11	29	Relegation to Gamma Ethniki
16	Veria (R)	30	5	7	18	23	56	−33	22	Relegation to Football League

Source: Super League Greece
Rules for classification: 1) Points; 2) Head-to-head points; 3) Head-to-head goal difference; 4) Goals scored; 5) Goals against; 6) Play-offs (neutral ground); 7) Draw.
(Note: Criteria 6 is only used if needed to decide champion, teams for relegation or teams for UEFA competitions).
(C) Champions; (R) Relegated

=== Postponement ===
The Greek Super League was originally scheduled for 20 August 2016 but Greece's Sports minister Stavros Kontonis decided it would be postponed due to fears of violence.

The first match was then postponed and scheduled to be played on 10 September 2016 between Kerkyra and Platanias.

The match was a success and went ahead with no issues with Platanias winning 1–0.

On 9 November refereeing chief Giorgos Bikas was the victim of an arson attack, this led to Greek football of all divisions to be suspended.

=== Results ===
Home \ Away	AEK	AEL	AST	ATR	IRA	KER	LEV	OLY	PAO	PNE	PGSS	PAOK	PAS	PLA	VER	XAN
AEK Athens	—	3–0	2–0	2–2	0–0	5–0	4–0	1–0	2–3	0–0	0–0	3–0	1–1	3–0	6–0	4–1
AEL	1–2	—	1–4	1–2	2–2	1–1	2–1	1–0	0–0	1–0	2–0	0–2	1–1	0–0	2–1	1–0
Asteras Tripolis	3–2	1–1	—	0–1	2–2	1–2	1–0	0–0	0–5	4–1	1–1	1–2	1–1	2–0	0–0	0–0
Atromitos	0–1	0–0	1–0	—	1–0	1–4	2–0	0–1	0–1	0–2	1–2	0–2	1–1	4–1	1–0	2–1
Iraklis	2–2	1–1	1–1	1–2	—	0–0	1–0	1–2	1–1	2–1	1–2	1–1	2–1	1–1	1–1	0–1
Kerkyra	1–1	2–0	2–0	1–1	0–3	—	1–0	0–2	1–1	0–0	1–0	0–5	0–1	0–1	2–0	1–0
Levadiakos	0–2	1–1	1–1	1–1	3–0	2–1	—	1–1	0–3	2–1	1–4	0–1	2–1	1–2	3–1	1–1
Olympiacos	3–0	2–0	2–1	2–0	3–0	0–0	4–0	—	3–0	3–1	0–1	2–1	5–0	2–1	6–1	2–0
Panathinaikos	0–0	2–0	3–1	1–0	2–0	1–0	0–0	1–0	—	4–0	1–0	1–0	4–0	2–1	5–0	1–2
Panetolikos	3–2	2–1	1–1	2–0	2–0	4–0	2–0	0–2	0–0	—	0–2	0–1	1–2	1–2	1–0	2–3
Panionios	1–1	1–0	3–0	2–1	1–0	1–0	1–3	0–2	1–1	2–0	—	1–0	1–1	1–1	1–2	2–0
PAOK	1–0	2–0	3–2	3–4	1–0	5–1	3–0	2–0	3–0	2–1	1–0	—	0–1	3–0	4–0	0–0
PAS Giannina	1–1	4–0	1–2	3–0	1–2	1–0	0–0	0–2	1–1	0–0	1–0	0–1	—	0–0	2–0	1–1
Platanias	0–2	3–2	3–0	3–0	1–0	2–1	3–2	2–2	1–0	0–0	1–1	1–3	3–3	—	1–0	0–1
Veria	0–2	1–1	4–3	0–1	0–2	4–0	2–0	1–2	1–1	1–1	0–1	0–0	3–0	0–0	—	0–4
Xanthi	0–0	1–0	3–1	0–0	3–1	0–0	2–2	0–2	1–0	3–0	0–2	0–0	2–0	1–0	3–0	—

Source: Super League Greece
Legend: Blue = home team win; Yellow = draw; Red = away team win.
For upcoming matches, an "a" indicates there is an article about the rivalry between the two participants.

=== Positions by round ===
The table lists the positions of teams after each week of matches. In order to preserve chronological evolvements, any postponed matches are not included in the round at which they were originally scheduled, but added to the full round they were played immediately afterwards.

Team ╲ Round	1	2	3	4	5	6	7	8	9	10	11	12	13	14	15	16	17	18	19	20	21	22	23	24	25	26	27	28	29	30
Olympiacos	1	1	4	2	1	1	1	1	1	1	1	1	1	1	1	1	1	1	1	1	1	1	1	1	1	1	1	1	1	1
PAOK	9	6	6	7	5	7	4	6	9	11	9	8	6	8	9	6	5	3	3	3	3	3	3	3	3	3	2	2	2	2
Panathinaikos	3	2	1	1	2	2	2	2	3	2	2	3	3	4	4	3	4	5	5	4	4	4	4	4	4	4	3	4	3	3
AEK Athens	2	3	2	5	3	3	5	5	4	5	3	5	5	6	5	7	6	6	6	6	5	5	6	5	5	5	5	5	4	4
Panionios	4	4	5	3	4	5	6	4	5	7	5	4	4	2	2	4	2	2	2	2	2	2	2	2	2	2	4	3	5	5
Xanthi	11	14	15	15	11	8	8	9	7	6	4	2	2	3	3	2	3	4	4	5	6	6	5	6	7	6	6	6	6	6
Platanias	6	5	3	4	7	10	9	10	13	12	13	10	9	9	7	8	8	8	7	7	7	7	7	7	6	7	7	7	7	7
Atromitos	15	16	13	12	9	6	7	8	6	4	7	7	8	7	8	9	9	9	9	9	9	8	8	8	8	9	9	8	8	8
PAS Giannina	5	8	9	6	8	4	3	3	2	3	6	6	7	5	6	5	7	7	8	8	8	9	9	9	9	8	8	9	9	9
Kerkyra	13	9	11	13	15	12	13	11	11	10	11	11	11	12	12	12	12	12	12	11	11	11	11	10	10	10	10	11	10	10
Panetolikos	10	7	7	9	6	9	10	7	10	9	8	9	10	10	11	11	11	11	10	10	10	10	10	11	11	11	11	10	11	11
Asteras Tripolis	14	13	16	16	14	15	14	12	12	13	12	13	13	11	10	10	10	10	11	12	12	12	13	12	13	13	12	12	14	12
AEL	7	11	8	8	10	13	11	14	14	14	14	14	12	13	13	13	13	13	13	13	13	13	12	13	12	12	13	14	13	13
Levadiakos	16	12	10	10	12	11	12	13	8	8	10	12	14	14	14	15	15	14	14	14	14	14	14	14	14	14	14	15	15	14
Iraklis	8	10	14	14	16	16	16	16	16	16	16	16	16	16	16	16	16	15	15	15	15	15	15	15	15	15	15	13	12	15
Veria	12	15	12	11	13	14	15	15	15	15	15	15	15	15	15	14	14	16	16	16	16	16	16	16	16	16	16	16	16	16

Champion and Champions League third qualifying round
Qualification for the play-offs
Relegation to 2017–18 Football League

Source: Super League Greece

== Play-offs ==
In the play-offs for Champions League and Europa League berths, the four qualified teams play each other in a home and away round robin. However, they do not all start with 0 points. Instead, a weighting system applies to the teams' standing at the start of the play-off mini-league. The team finishing fifth in the Super League will start the play-off with 0 points. The fifth placed team's end of season tally of points is subtracted from the sum of the points that other teams have. This number is then divided by five.

So, both AEK Athens and Panionios will begin the play-offs pointless. PAOK will enter the play-offs with two points, while Panathinaikos will have one point.

Pos	Team	Pld	W	D	L	GF	GA	GD	Pts	Qualification	AEK	PAO	PAOK	PGSS
2	AEK Athens	6	4	0	2	5	3	+2	12	Qualification for the Champions League third qualifying round	—	1–0	1–0	0–1
3	Panathinaikos (Note: Panathinaikos were deducted 3 points due to fan behavior against PAOK.)	6	3	1	2	6	7	−1	8	Qualification for the Europa League third qualifying round (Note: PAOK qualified for the Europa League third qualifying round by winning the Greek Cup.)	1–0	—	0–3 (Note: Match abandoned in the 54th minute with the score at 1–0. It was later rewarded as a 0–3 win for PAOK.)	1–0
4	PAOK (Note: PAOK were deducted 6 points due to fan behavior against AEK Athens in Greek Cup final.)	6	3	0	3	7	5	+2	5	Qualification for the Europa League third qualifying round	0–1	2–3	—	1–0
5	Panionios	6	1	1	4	3	6	−3	4	Qualification for the Europa League second qualifying round	1–2	1–1	0–1	—

Source: Super League Greece: Standings, Schedule
Legend: Blue = home team win; Yellow = draw; Red = away team win.
Rules for classification: 1) Points; 2) Head-to-head points; 3) Head-to-head goal difference; 4) Goals scored; 5) Goals against; 6) Regular season position.

== Season statistics ==
Updated to games played 30 April 2017

=== Top scorers ===
Rank	Player	Club	Goals
1	(Sweden) Marcus Berg	Panathinaikos	22
2	(Tunisia) Hamza Younés	Xanthi	19
3	(Spain) Pedro Conde	PAS Giannina	13
3	(Nigeria) Brown Ideye	Olympiacos	13
5	(Greece) Giorgos Giakoumakis	Platanias	11
6	(Greece) Michalis Manias	Asteras Tripolis	10
7	(Greece) Thomas Nazlidis	AEL	9
7	(Comoros) Ben Nabouhane	Panionios	9
7	(Czech Republic) Tomáš Pekhart	AEK Athens	9
10	(Greece) Giorgos Manousos	Platanias	8

=== Top assists ===
Rank	Player	Club	Assists
1	(Brazil) Sebá	Olympiacos	9
2	(Greece) Kostas Fortounis	Olympiacos	6
2	(Iran) Masoud Shojaei	Panionios	6
2	(Greece) Panagiotis Triadis	Xanthi	6
5	(Portugal) Diogo Figueiras	Olympiacos	5
5	(Spain) Alberto de la Bella	Olympiacos	5
5	(Argentina) Patito Rodríguez	AEK Athens	5
5	(Greece) Lazaros Christodoulopoulos	AEK Athens	5
5	(Netherlands) Diego Biseswar	PAOK	5
5	(Brazil) Leozinho	Iraklis	5

== Awards ==
=== MVP and Best Goal Awards ===
Matchday	MVP	Best Goal	Ref
1st	(Greece) Dimitris Kyriakidis (Panetolikos)	(Greece) Kostas Fortounis (Olympiacos)	
2nd	(Greece) Alexandros Paschalakis (PAS Giannina)	(Serbia) Luka Milivojević (Olympiacos)	
3rd	(Portugal) Hugo Almeida (AEK Athens)		
4th	(Greece) Efthymis Koulouris (PAOK)		
5th	(Greece) Dimitris Kyriakidis (Panetolikos)	(Argentina) Javier Umbides (Atromitos)	
6th	(Portugal) André Martins (Olympiacos)	(Nigeria) Brown Ideye (Olympiacos)	
7th	(Greece) Vangelis Platellas (AEK Athens)	(Greece) Theodoros Vasilakakis (Xanthi)	
8th	(Serbia) Luka Milivojević (Olympiacos)	(Greece) Evripidis Giakos (PAS Giannina)	
9th	(Republic of the Congo) Christopher Maboulou (PAS Giannina)	(Greece) Thomas Nazlidis (AEL)	
10th	(Spain) Alberto Botía (Olympiacos)	(Argentina) Patito Rodríguez (AEK Athens)	
11th	(Greece) Vasilis Barkas (AEK Athens)	(Serbia) Kristijan Miljević (Veria)	
12th	(Argentina) Javier Umbides (Atromitos)	(Greece) Chrysovalantis Kozoronis (PAS Giannina)	
13th	(Greece) Fotis Koutzavasilis (Kerkyra)	(Greece) Dimitrios Limnios (Atromitos)	
14th	(Brazil) Léo Matos (PAOK)	(Portugal) André Simões (AEK Athens)	
15th	(Tunisia) Hamza Younés (Xanthi)	(Netherlands) Diego Biseswar (PAOK)	
16th	(Greece) Grigoris Makos (Panetolikos)	(Brazil) Léo Matos (PAOK)	
17th	(Greece) Spyros Risvanis (Panionios)		
18th	(Serbia) Luka Milivojević (Olympiacos)	(Spain) Pedro Conde (PAS Giannina)	
19th	(Greece) Panagiotis Korbos (Panionios)		
20th	(Serbia) Živko Živković (Xanthi)	(Spain) Pedro Conde (PAS Giannina)	
21st	(Spain) Pedro Conde (PAS Giannina)	(Greece) Dimitrios Pelkas (PAOK)	
22nd	(Greece) Vangelis Ikonomou (Panionios)	(Greece) Theodoros Vasilakakis (Xanthi)	
23rd	(Serbia) Aleksandar Prijović (PAOK)	(Spain) Pedro Conde (PAS Giannina)	
24th	(Argentina) Sergio Araujo (AEK Athens)		
25th	(Sweden) Marcus Berg (Panathinaikos)		
26th	(Sweden) Marcus Berg (Panathinaikos)	(Greece) Georgios Masouras (Panionios)	
27th	(Greece) Michalis Manias (Asteras Tripolis)	(Netherlands) Diego Biseswar (PAOK)	
28th	(Greece) Christos Donis (Iraklis)	(Greece) Michalis Bastakos (Iraklis)	
29th	(Greece) Michalis Bastakos (Iraklis)	(Spain) Alberto de la Bella (Olympiacos)	
30th	(Argentina) Alejandro Domínguez (Olympiacos)	(Greece) Giorgos Kyriakopoulos (Asteras Tripolis)	

=== Annual awards ===
Annual awards were announced on 7 May 2017.

Award	Winner	Club
Greek Player of the Season	(Greece) Petros Mantalos	AEK Athens
Foreign Player of the Season	(Sweden) Marcus Berg	Panathinaikos
Young Player of the Season	(Greece) Panagiotis Retsos	Olympiacos
Goalkeeper of the Season	(Greece) Andreas Gianniotis	Panionios
Golden Boot	(Sweden) Marcus Berg	Panathinaikos
Manager of the Season	(Serbia) Vladimir Ivić	PAOK

Team of the Season
Goalkeeper	(Greece) Andreas Gianniotis (Panionios)				
Defence	(Brazil) Léo Matos (PAOK)		(Greece) Panagiotis Retsos (Olympiacos)	(Brazil) Rodrigo Moledo (Panathinaikos)	(Greece) Leonardo Koutris (PAS Giannina)
Midfield	(Iran) Masoud Shojaei (Panionios)	(Greece) Zeca (Panathinaikos)	(Greece) Kostas Fortounis (Olympiacos)	(Greece) Manolis Siopis (Panionios)	(Greece) Petros Mantalos (AEK Athens)
Attack	(Sweden) Marcus Berg (Panathinaikos)				

== Attendances ==
Olympiacos drew the highest average home attendance in the 2016–17 edition of the Super League Greece.

Pos	Team	Total	High	Low	Average	Change
1	Olympiacos	270,663	31,283	9,032	18,044	−13.9%
2	PAOK	178,744	26,379	2,906	11,916	0.0%
3	AEK Athens	133,628	28,046	3,755	8,909	−20.1%
4	Panathinaikos	88,189	13,666	1,398	5,879	−23.1%
5	AEL	37,345	5,507	1,266	2,490	n/a^{1}
6	Panetolikos	35,233	4,179	1,727	2,349	+0.2%
7	PAS Giannina	33,648	4,009	1,502	2,243	+5.4%
8	Panionios	26,401	4,979	525	1,760	+24.8%
9	Platanias	25,448	2,463	1,324	1,697	−10.3%
10	Iraklis	21,749	3,864	330	1,450	−53.1%
11	Asteras Tripolis	21,418	1,960	828	1,428	−15.0%
12	Kerkyra	16,645	2,042	728	1,110	n/a^{1}
13	Levadiakos	15,453	2,446	385	1,030	+20.0%
14	Xanthi	15,218	1,959	515	1,015	−19.8%
15	Veria	14,780	3,583	245	985	−18.0%
16	Atromitos	9,237	1,553	294	711	−25.9%^{2}
	League total	943,799	31,283	245	3,939	−1.4%

Updated to games played on 30 April 2017
Source: slgr.gr
Notes:
1: Team played last season in Football League
2: Atromitos game was played behind closed gates
