= 2015–16 Super League Greece =

80th season of top-tier football league in Greece

Super League Greece
- Season: 2015–16
- Dates: 22 August 2015 – 17 April 2016
- Champions: Olympiacos; 43rd Greek title
- Relegated: Panthrakikos; AEL Kalloni
- Champions League: Olympiacos; PAOK
- Europa League: Panathinaikos; AEK Athens; PAS Giannina
- Matches: 240
- Goals: 543 (2.26 per match)
- Top goalscorer: Kostas Fortounis (18 goals)
- Biggest home win: Panathinaikos 6–1 Panthrakikos (17 April 2016); Olympiacos 5–0 AEL Kalloni (17 April 2016)
- Biggest away win: Panetolikos 1–5 Panionios (3 October 2015)
- Highest scoring: Panthrakikos 3–4 Olympiacos (5 December 2015); Panetolikos 2–5 Olympiacos (10 April 2016); Panathinaikos 6–1 Panthrakikos (17 April 2016)
- Longest winning run: Olympiacos (17 games)
- Longest unbeaten run: Olympiacos (21 games)
- Longest winless run: AEL Kalloni (13 games)
- Longest losing run: AEL Kalloni (8 games)
- Highest attendance: AEK Athens 1–0 Olympiacos (13 February 2016) 31,121
- Lowest attendance: Levadiakos 1–1 Iraklis (16 January 2016) 197
- Total attendance: 1,042,228

The 2015–16 Super League Greece was the 80th season of the highest tier in league of Greek football and the tenth under its current title. The season started on 22 August 2015 and ended in May 2016. The league comprised fourteen teams from the 2014–15 season and two promoted from the 2014–15 Football League. Olympiacos won their sixth consecutive title and 43rd overall, making a record collection of points (85 out of 90) in a championship of 30 games.

== Teams ==
Four teams were relegated from the 2014–15 season. Kerkyra and Ergotelis play in Football League for the 2015–16 season. Niki Volos and OFI would play in Gamma Ethniki.

Two teams were promoted from the 2014–15 Football League, champions AEK Athens and Iraklis, two teams with a long history in the top championship of Greece.

Promoted from 2014–15 Football League	Relegated from 2014–15 Super League Greece
AEK Athens; Iraklis	Ergotelis; OFI; Niki Volos; Kerkyra

=== Stadiums and locations ===
Location of the 2015–16 Super League Greece teams

Club	Location	Venue	Capacity	2014–15
AEK Athens	Athens (Marousi)	Athens Olympic Stadium	69,638	1st (FL)
AEL Kalloni	Mytilene	Mytilene Municipal Stadium	3,000	10th
Asteras Tripolis	Tripoli	Theodoros Kolokotronis Stadium	7,616	4th
Atromitos	Athens (Peristeri)	Peristeri Stadium	10,005	5th
Iraklis	Thessaloniki (Triandria)	Kaftanzoglio Stadium	27,560	2nd (FL)
Levadiakos	Livadeia	Levadia Municipal Stadium	6,500	14th
Olympiacos	Piraeus	Karaiskakis Stadium	32,115	1st
Panathinaikos	Athens (Ampelokipoi)	Leoforos Alexandras Stadium	16,003	2nd
Panetolikos	Agrinio	Panetolikos Stadium	7,000	7th
Panionios	Athens (Nea Smyrni)	Nea Smyrni Stadium	11,700	12th
Panthrakikos	Komotini	Komotini Municipal Stadium	6,200	11th
PAOK	Thessaloniki (Toumba)	Toumba Stadium	28,703	3rd
PAS Giannina	Ioannina	Zosimades Stadium	7,652	6th
Platanias	Chania	Perivolia Municipal Stadium	4,000	9th
Skoda Xanthi	Xanthi	Skoda Xanthi Arena	7,422	8th
Veria	Veria	Veria Stadium	6,500	13th

=== Personnel and kits ===
Note: Flags indicate national team as has been defined under FIFA eligibility rules. Players and Managers may hold more than one non-FIFA nationality.

Team	Head coach	Captain	Kit manufacturer	Shirt sponsor
AEK Athens	(Greece) Stelios Manolas	(Greece) Petros Mantalos	Nike	Pame Stoixima
AEL Kalloni	(Greece) Nikos Karageorgiou	(Greece) Giorgos Manousos	Adidas	Novibet
Asteras Tripolis	(Greece) Makis Chavos	(Romania) Dorin Goian	Nike	Stoiximan.GR
Atromitos	(Greece) Traianos Dellas	(Brazil) Luiz Brito	Saller	Tzoker
Iraklis	(Greece) Nikos Papadopoulos	(Greece) Nikos Pourtoulidis	Blue Line	Pame Stoixima
Levadiakos	(Greece) Dimitris Farantos	(Greece) Thanasis Moulopoulos	Umbro	Vanmax S.A.
Olympiacos	(Portugal) Marco Silva	(Spain) David Fuster	Adidas	Stoiximan.GR
Panathinaikos	(Italy) Andrea Stramaccioni	(Portugal) Zeca	Puma	Pame Stoixima
Panetolikos	(Greece) Giannis Matzourakis	(Greece) Georgios Kousas	Joma	Pame Stoixima
Panionios	(Greece) Marinos Ouzounidis	(Greece) Pavlos Mitropoulos	Tempo Sport	Tzoker
Panthrakikos	(Serbia) Zoran Stoinović	(Greece) Antonis Ladakis	Nike	Stoiximan.GR
PAOK	(Serbia) Vladimir Ivić	(Greece) Stefanos Athanasiadis	Macron	Sportingbet
PAS Giannina	(Greece) Giannis Petrakis	(Greece) Alexios Michail	Nike	Tzoker
Platanias	(Greece) Giorgos Paraschos	(Greece) Dimitris Alkis	Macron	Stoiximan.GR
Skoda Xanthi	(Romania) Răzvan Lucescu	(Greece) Konstantinos Fliskas	Joma	Pame Stoixima
Veria	(Greece) Dimitris Eleftheropoulos	(Greece) Alexandros Vergonis	Nike	Stoiximan.GR

=== Managerial changes ===
Team	Outgoing manager	Manner of departure	Date of vacancy	Position in table	Incoming manager	Date of appointment
Panetolikos	(Greece) Makis Chavos	End of contract	30 June 2015	Pre-season	(Portugal) Leonel Pontes	9 June 2015
Atromitos	(Greece) Nikos Nioplias	End of contract	30 June 2015	Pre-season	(Greece) Michalis Grigoriou	14 June 2015
PAOK	(Greece) Georgios Georgiadis	End of tenure as caretaker	30 June 2015	Pre-season	(Croatia) Igor Tudor	18 June 2015
Veria	(Greece) Dimitris Christoforidis	End of tenure as caretaker	30 June 2015	Pre-season	(Greece) Georgios Georgiadis	18 June 2015
Olympiacos	(Portugal) Vítor Pereira	Resigned	30 June 2015	Pre-season	(Portugal) Marco Silva	7 July 2015
Panthrakikos	(Spain) José Manuel Roca	Sacked	15 September 2015	16th	(Greece) Dimitrios Eleftheropoulos	19 September 2015
Panetolikos	(Portugal) Leonel Pontes	Sacked	28 September 2015	5th	(Greece) Giannis Dalakouras (caretaker)	28 September 2015
Panetolikos	(Greece) Giannis Dalakouras (caretaker)	End of tenure as caretaker	7 October 2015	10th	(Greece) Giannis Matzourakis	7 October 2015
AEK Athens	(Greece) Traianos Dellas	Resigned	20 October 2015	4th	(Greece) Stelios Manolas (caretaker)	20 October 2015
AEK Athens	(Greece) Stelios Manolas (caretaker)	End of tenure as caretaker	28 October 2015	3rd	(Uruguay) Gus Poyet	28 October 2015
Panathinaikos	(Greece) Giannis Anastasiou	Mutual consent	2 November 2015	2nd	(England) Steve Rutter (caretaker)	2 November 2015
Atromitos	(Greece) Michalis Grigoriou	Sacked	3 November 2015	13th	(Greece) Traianos Dellas	4 November 2015
Panathinaikos	(England) Steve Rutter (caretaker)	End of tenure as caretaker	8 November 2015	2nd	(Italy) Andrea Stramaccioni	8 November 2015
AEL Kalloni	(Greece) Thalis Theodoridis	Sacked	27 December 2015	16th	(Greece) Nikos Karageorgiou	27 December 2015
Veria	(Greece) Georgios Georgiadis	Sacked	18 January 2016	12th	(Greece) Nikos Karampimperis (caretaker)	22 January 2016
Panthrakikos	(Greece) Dimitris Eleftheropoulos	Sacked	26 January 2016	15th	(Greece) Giannis Chatzinikolaou	26 January 2016
Veria	(Greece) Nikos Karampimperis (caretaker)	End of tenure as caretaker	26 January 2016	13th	(Greece) Dimitris Eleftheropoulos	26 January 2016
Asteras Tripolis	(Greece) Staikos Vergetis	Resigned	29 January 2016	5th	(Greece) Dimitris Terezopoulos (caretaker)	29 January 2016
Asteras Tripolis	(Greece) Dimitris Terezopoulos (caretaker)	End of tenure as caretaker	29 January 2016	6th	(Greece) Makis Chavos	29 February 2016
PAOK	(Croatia) Igor Tudor	Sacked	9 March 2016	4th	(Serbia) Vladimir Ivić	9 March 2016
Panthrakikos	(Greece) Giannis Chatzinikolaou	Sacked	16 March 2016	15th	(Serbia) Zoran Stoinović	17 March 2016
Levadiakos	(Greece) Akis Mantzios	Sacked	8 April 2016	11th	(Greece) Dimitris Farantos	8 April 2016
AEK Athens	(Uruguay) Gus Poyet	Resigned	9 April 2016	3rd	(Greece) Stelios Manolas (caretaker)	10 April 2016

== Regular season ==
=== League table ===
Pos	Team	Pld	W	D	L	GF	GA	GD	Pts	Qualification or relegation
1	Olympiacos (C)	30	28	1	1	81	16	+65	85	Qualification for the Champions League third qualifying round
2	Panathinaikos (Note: Panathinaikos were deducted 3 points due to extreme fan behavior against Olympiacos. The match was awarded as a 3–0 win for Olympiacos.)	30	18	4	8	52	26	+26	55	Qualification for the Play-offs
3	AEK Athens (Note: AEK were deducted 3 points due to extreme fan behavior against Atromitos.)	30	17	6	7	43	21	+22	54	Qualification for the Play-offs
4	PAOK (Note: PAOK were deducted 3 points due to extreme fan behavior against Olympiacos in Greek Cup semifinal match.)	30	13	9	8	45	32	+13	45	Qualification for the Play-offs
5	Panionios	30	12	8	10	33	27	+6	44	Qualification for the Play-offs
6	PAS Giannina	30	12	6	12	36	40	−4	42	Qualification for the Europa League second qualifying round (Note: The fifth-placed team of the 2015–16 Super League Greece Panionios would have qualified for the UEFA Europa League second qualifying round, but were excluded from participating in the 2016–17 European competitions by UEFA for financial reasons. As a result, the berth was given to the sixth-placed team PAS Giannina.)
7	Asteras Tripolis	30	11	8	11	31	30	+1	41	
8	Atromitos (Note: Atromitos were deducted 3 points due to extreme fan behavior against AEK.)	30	12	6	12	26	31	−5	39 (Note: Head-to-head points: Atromitos 4, Platanias 1.)	
9	Platanias	30	10	9	11	32	30	+2	39	
10	Levadiakos	30	9	10	11	27	36	−9	37	
11	Panetolikos	30	9	8	13	30	46	−16	35 (Note: Head-to-head points: Panetolikos 4, Iraklis 1.)	
12	Iraklis	30	8	11	11	24	32	−8	35	
13	Skoda Xanthi	30	6	15	9	27	32	−5	33	
14	Veria	30	5	12	13	19	33	−14	27	
15	Panthrakikos (R)	30	3	8	19	18	58	−40	17	Relegation to the Football League
16	AEL Kalloni (R)	30	3	7	20	19	53	−34	16	Relegation to the Football League

Source: Super League Greece
Rules for classification: 1) Points; 2) Head-to-head points; 3) Head-to-head goal difference; 4) Goals scored; 5) Goals against; 6) Play-offs (neutral ground); 7) Draw.
(Note: Criteria 6 is only used if needed to decide champion, teams for relegation or teams for UEFA competitions).
(C) Champions; (R) Relegated

=== Results ===
Home \ Away	AEK	AST	ATR	IRA	KAL	LEV	OLY	PAO	PNE	PGSS	PNT	PAOK	PAS	PLA	XAN	VER
AEK Athens		0–1	1–0	5–1	3–0	1–2	1–0	1–0	2–0	2–0	3–0	1–0	3–1	3–0	2–1	3–0
Asteras Tripolis	0–0		1–0	1–2	3–1	2–0	1–2	0–0	0–2	2–1	4–0	2–1	0–0	1–1	1–1	2–1
Atromitos	1–0	2–1		1–0	1–0	1–0	1–2	1–2	1–0	1–0	1–2	1–2	0–2	0–0	0–1	0–0
Iraklis	1–1	0–1	2–0		3–0	0–1	0–2	1–0	0–0	0–1	0–0	3–3	1–0	0–0	1–1	1–1
AEL Kalloni	0–0	1–1	2–4	0–1		0–0	0–2	0–2	5–1	1–1	2–0	1–3	0–2	2–1	2–2	0–1
Levadiakos	3–0	2–1	1–1	1–1	1–0		0–2	0–2	2–2	0–2	1–1	0–0	1–1	0–3	1–0	1–1
Olympiacos	4–0	3–1	4–0	2–0	5–0	3–1		3–1	1–0	3–0	4–0	1–0	5–1	3–1	1–0	3–0
Panathinaikos	0–0	2–0	2–0	4–0	4–0	3–0	0–3 (Note: Olympiacos awarded a 3–0 away w/o win against Panathinaikos.)		4–2	0–0	6–1	2–2	3–1	1–0	0–1	3–2
Panetolikos	1–0	2–1	1–1	2–0	1–0	2–0	2–5	1–2		1–5	1–0	0–3	2–1	1–2	2–2	1–1
Panionios	1–1	0–0	0–1	1–0	2–0	0–2	1–3	1–0	2–0		1–1	3–1	2–0	2–1	3–0	0–1
Panthrakikos	1–2	0–2	0–1	0–3	0–0	1–3	3–4	1–0	0–0	0–1		2–1	2–4	0–2	0–0	0–2
PAOK	2–1	2–0	1–1	0–1	3–0	2–0	0–2	3–1	0–0	2–1	3–3		3–1	1–0	0–0	2–1
PAS Giannina	0–2	1–2	1–0	2–2	2–1	0–1	0–3	0–3	2–0	1–1	2–0	3–1		2–0	1–1	2–0
Platanias	0–3	2–0	1–2	0–0	2–1	2–1	1–1	2–3	1–1	0–0	4–0	0–0	0–1		3–1	0–0
Skoda Xanthi	0–0	0–0	2–2	2–0	0–0	2–2	1–3	0–1	3–1	2–0	1–0	1–1	0–1	0–2		1–1
Veria	1–2	1–0	0–1	0–0	2–0	0–0	0–2	0–1	0–1	1–1	0–0	0–3	1–1	0–1	1–1	

Source: Super League Greece
Legend: Blue = home team win; Yellow = draw; Red = away team win.

=== Positions by round ===
The table lists the positions of teams after each week of matches. In order to preserve chronological evolvements, any postponed matches are not included in the round at which they were originally scheduled, but added to the full round they were played immediately afterwards. For example, if a match is scheduled for matchday 13, but then postponed and played between days 16 and 17, it will be added to the standings for day 16.

Team ╲ Round	1	2	3	4	5	6	7	8	9	10	11	12	13	14	15	16	17	18	19	20	21	22	23	24	25	26	27	28	29	30
Olympiacos	2	2	1	1	1	1	1	1	1	1	1	1	1	1	1	1	1	1	1	1	1	1	1	1	1	1	1	1	1	1
Panathinaikos	4	1	4	2	2	2	2	2	2	2	2	4	3	2	4	3	3	4	3	3	3	3	3	3	3	3	3	3	3	2
AEK Athens	1	6	2	3	4	3	4	3	3	5	4	2	2	3	2	2	2	2	2	2	2	2	2	2	2	2	2	2	2	3
PAOK	9	12	9	5	3	5	5	4	6	6	6	6	4	4	3	4	4	3	4	4	4	5	5	4	4	4	4	5	5	4
Panionios	15	9	3	9	8	4	3	5	4	3	5	3	5	5	5	6	5	6	6	6	5	4	4	5	5	5	5	4	4	5
PAS Giannina	7	4	8	4	7	7	10	11	7	12	8	10	11	10	8	8	8	9	7	8	10	12	12	11	9	7	6	8	6	6
Asteras Tripolis	3	7	11	7	6	9	7	6	5	4	3	5	6	6	7	5	6	5	5	5	6	6	6	6	6	6	9	7	9	7
Atromitos	5	3	6	8	10	13	8	9	13	14	14	14	14	14	14	14	14	14	14	13	13	13	13	13	13	13	10	9	7	8
Platanias	16	13	15	15	16	15	14	10	9	10	9	7	7	8	11	10	10	10	11	12	11	9	10	12	12	8	7	6	8	9
Levadiakos	13	14	12	13	11	6	6	7	10	7	12	8	8	7	6	7	7	7	8	9	12	11	11	8	7	9	11	11	11	10
Panetolikos	11	8	5	6	5	10	11	12	14	11	11	13	13	13	13	13	12	11	9	7	7	7	7	7	10	11	8	10	10	11
Iraklis	6	10	13	12	12	12	12	14	12	13	13	11	9	9	9	9	9	8	10	10	8	8	8	10	11	12	13	13	12	12
Skoda Xanthi	10	11	7	11	9	11	13	13	11	9	7	9	10	11	12	12	13	12	12	11	9	10	9	9	8	10	12	12	13	13
Veria	8	5	10	10	14	8	9	8	8	8	10	12	12	12	10	11	11	13	13	14	14	14	14	14	14	14	14	14	14	14
Panthrakikos	14	15	16	16	15	16	16	16	16	16	16	16	16	15	15	15	15	15	15	15	15	15	15	16	15	15	15	15	15	15
AEL Kalloni	12	16	14	14	13	14	15	15	15	15	15	15	15	16	16	16	16	16	16	16	16	16	16	15	16	16	16	16	16	16

Champion and Champions League third qualifying round
Qualification for the play-offs
Relegation to 2016–17 Football League

Source: slgr.gr

== Play-offs ==
In the play-off for Champions League, the four qualified teams play each other in a home-and-away round robin. However, they do not all start with 0 points: instead, a weighting system applies to the teams' standing at the start of the play-off mini-league. The team finishing in fifth in the Super League will start the play-off with 0 points. Its end-of-season tally of points is then used to calculate the number of points with which the other teams will start the play-offs: more specifically, each of the three other teams participating in the play-offs will have the fifth-placed team's total points tally subtracted from their own points tally and then divided by five – giving the final figure.

Pos	Team	Pld	W	D	L	GF	GA	GD	Pts	Qualification	PAOK	PAO	AEK	PGSS
2	PAOK	6	3	3	0	8	3	+5	12	Qualification for the Champions League third qualifying round		1–1	2–1	2–0
3	Panathinaikos	6	2	3	1	8	6	+2	11	Qualification for the Europa League third qualifying round (Note: AEK Athens qualified for the Europa League third qualifying round by winning the Greek Cup.)	1–1		3–0	1–0
4	AEK Athens	6	2	1	3	5	7	−2	9	Qualification for the Europa League third qualifying round	0–0	3–1		1–0
5	Panionios (Note: The fifth-placed team of the 2015–16 Super League Greece Panionios would have qualified for the Europa League second qualifying round, but were excluded from participating in the 2016–17 European competitions by UEFA for financial reasons. As a result, the berth was given to the sixth-placed team PAS Giannina.)	6	1	1	4	2	7	−5	4		0–2	1–1	1–0	

Source: Super League Greece: Standings, Schedule
Rules for classification: 1) Points; 2) Head-to-head points; 3) Head-to-head goal difference; 4) Goals scored; 5) Goals against; 6) Regular season position.

== Season statistics ==
Updated to games played 17 April 2016

=== Top scorers ===
Rank	Player	Club	Goals
1	(Greece) Kostas Fortounis	Olympiacos	18
2	(Sweden) Marcus Berg	Panathinaikos	15
3	(Greece) Apostolos Giannou	Asteras Tripolis	13
4	(Greece) Stefanos Athanasiadis	PAOK	11
4	(Greece) Anastasios Bakasetas	Panionios	11
4	(Greece) Apostolos Vellios	Iraklis	11
4	(Greece) Vangelis Mantzios	Levadiakos	11
8	(Nigeria) Brown Ideye	Olympiacos	10
8	(Greece) Michalis Manias	PAS Giannina	10

=== Top assists ===
Rank	Player	Club	Assists
1	(Greece) Kostas Fortounis	Olympiacos	13
2	(Cameroon) Olivier Boumale	Panionios / Panathinaikos	9
3	(Greece) Anastasios Bakasetas	Panionios	6
3	(Nigeria) Brown Ideye	Olympiacos	6
3	(Argentina) Javier Umbides	Atromitos	6
7	(Brazil) Rodrigo Galo	AEK Athens	5
7	(Greece) Fanouris Goundoulakis	Platanias	5
7	(Portugal) Hernâni	Olympiacos	5
7	(Serbia) Brana Ilić	PAS Giannina	5
7	(Argentina) Sebastián Leto	Panathinaikos	5
7	(Spain) Dani Nieto	Skoda Xanthi	5
7	(Greece) Dimitrios Pelkas	PAOK	5
7	(Argentina) Lucas Villafáñez	Panetolikos / Panathinaikos	5

== Awards ==
=== MVP and Best Goal Awards ===
Matchday	MVP	Best Goal	Ref
1st	(Sweden) Marcus Berg (Panathinaikos)	(Brazil) Rodrigo Galo (AEK Athens)	
2nd	(Greece) Marcos Vellidis (PAS Giannina)	(Egypt) Amr Warda (Panetolikos)	
3rd	(Argentina) Diego Buonanotte (AEK Athens)		
4th	(Cape Verde) Garry Rodrigues (PAOK)	(Greece) Nikos Karelis (Panathinaikos)	
5th	(Greece) Vangelis Mantzios (Levadiakos)	(Portugal) Hélder Barbosa (AEK Athens)	
6th	(Spain) Roberto (Olympiacos)	(Greece) Pavlos Kyriakidis (Iraklis)	
7th	(Nigeria) Brown Ideye (Olympiacos)	(Serbia) Luka Milunović (Platanias)	
8th	(Cape Verde) Garry Rodrigues (PAOK)	(Greece) Christos Aravidis (AEK Athens)	
9th	(Argentina) Diego Romano (Iraklis)	(Greece) Manolis Papasterianos (Xanthi)	
10th	(Sweden) Marcus Berg (Panathinaikos)	(Greece) Thanasis Papageorgiou (Panthrakikos)	
11th	(Sweden) Jakob Johansson (AEK Athens)	(Greece) Kenan Bargan (AEL Kalloni)	
12th	(Greece) Apostolos Vellios (Iraklis)		
13th	(Brazil) Huanderson (Iraklis)	(Greece) Apostolos Vellios (Iraklis)	
14th	(Greece) Nikos Karelis (Panathinaikos)	(Cameroon) Olivier Boumale (Panionios)	
15th	(Greece) Panagiotis Tsintotas (Levadiakos)	(Brazil) Rogério Martins (Panthrakikos)	
16th	(Greece) Apostolos Vellios (Iraklis)	(Portugal) Hélder Barbosa (AEK Athens)	
17th	(Greece) Giannis Anestis (AEK Athens)	(Portugal) Hélder Barbosa (AEK Athens)	
18th	(Greece) Sokratis Dioudis (Panionios)	(Portugal) Hélder Barbosa (AEK Athens)	
19th	(Greece) Michalis Manias (PAS Giannina)	(Ghana) Michael Essien (Panathinaikos)	
20th	(Greece) Kostas Fortounis (Olympiacos)		
21st	(Brazil) Luiz Brito (Atromitos)	(Greece) Fanouris Goundoulakis (Platanias)	
22nd	(Brazil) Leozinho (Iraklis)		
23rd	(Bosnia and Herzegovina) Gojko Cimirot (PAOK)		
24th	(Venezuela) Ronald Vargas (AEK Athens)		
25th	(Argentina) Lucas Villafáñez (Panathinaikos)	(Greece) Thanasis Papageorgiou (Panthrakikos)	
26th	(Greece) Anastasios Bakasetas (Panionios)		
27th	(Portugal) Hernâni (Olympiacos)	(Sweden) Marcus Berg (Panathinaikos)	
28th	(Greece) Anastasios Bakasetas (Panionios)	(Iran) Karim Ansarifard (Panionios)	
29th	(Greece) Kostas Fortounis (Olympiacos)	(Czech Republic) Tomáš Pekhart (AEK Athens)	
30th	(Sweden) Marcus Berg (Panathinaikos)		

=== Annual awards ===
Annual awards were announced on 30 January 2017.

Award	Winner	Club
Greek Player of the Season	(Greece) Kostas Fortounis	Olympiacos
Foreign Player of the Season	(Sweden) Marcus Berg	Panathinaikos
Young Player of the Season	(Greece) Charis Charisis	PAOK
Goalkeeper of the Season	(Spain) Roberto Jimenez	Olympiacos
Golden Boot	(Greece) Kostas Fortounis	Olympiacos
Manager of the Season	(Greece) Marinos Ouzounidis	Panionios

Team of the Season
Goalkeeper	(Spain) Roberto (Olympiacos)				
Defence	(Brazil) Rodrigo Galo (AEK Athens)		(Brazil) Rodrigo Moledo (Panathinaikos)	(Greece) Georgios Tzavellas (PAOK)	(France) Arthur Masuaku (Olympiacos)
Midfield	(Cape Verde) Garry Rodrigues (PAOK)	(Greece) Zeca (Panathinaikos)	(Greece) Kostas Fortounis (Olympiacos)	(Greece) Manolis Siopis (Panionios)	(Greece) Anastasios Bakasetas (Panionios)
Attack	(Sweden) Marcus Berg (Panathinaikos)				

== Attendances ==
Olympiacos drew the highest average home attendance in the 2015–16 edition of the Super League Greece.

Pos	Team	Total	High	Low	Average	Change
1	Olympiacos	272,303	30,314	13,227	20,946	+21.6%^{2}
2	PAOK	158,542	25,674	5,762	11,913	+31.7%^{2}
3	AEK Athens	162,277	31,121	2,647	11,150	n/a^{1,2}
4	Panathinaikos	80,423	15,640	4,378	7,645	+20.7%^{2}
5	Iraklis	42,091	10,043	979	3,091	n/a^{1}
6	Panetolikos	35,153	4,160	1,707	2,344	−3.7%
7	PAS Giannina	31,921	4,484	1,170	2,128	+35.4%
8	Platanias	28,380	3,052	1,453	1,892	+45.2%
9	Asteras Tripolis	25,204	2,558	961	1,680	+6.1%
10	Panionios	20,834	2,762	664	1,410	+40.2%
11	Skoda Xanthi	18,982	2,978	592	1,265	−17.9%
12	Veria	18,014	3,557	500	1,201	+1.7%
13	Panthrakikos	17,484	2,372	686	1,166	+1.5%
14	Atromitos	12,959	2,284	492	960	−17.8%^{2}
15	AEL Kalloni	13,811	2,159	256	921	−4.8%
16	Levadiakos	12,725	4,931	197	858	−11.6%
	League total	951,103	31,121	197	3,996	+27.0%

Updated to games played on 17 April 2016
Source: slgr.gr
Notes:
1: Team played last season in Football League
2: Olympiacos - AEK - PAOK - Panathinaikos - Atromitos games were played behind closed gates
3: Play-off matches are not included
