= Petros Giakoumakis =

Greek footballer

Personal information
- Date of birth: 3 July 1992 (age 34)
- Place of birth: Heraklion, Crete, Greece
- Height: 1.79 m (5 ft 10 1/2 in)
- Position: Forward

Team information
- Current team: Nestos Chrysoupoli
- Number: 9

Youth career
- –2011: Olympiakos Chersonissos

Senior career*
Years	Team	Apps	(Gls)
2011–2014	Atsalenios	26	(18)
2014–2019	Levadiakos	117	(22)
2019–2021	Atromitos	35	(3)
2021–2022	Veria	35	(8)
2022–2023	Lamia	14	(0)
2023	→ Olympiakos Nicosia (loan)	14	(0)
2023–2024	Ionikos	29	(6)
2024–2025	Makedonikos	11	(7)
2025	Punjab	10	(1)
2025–2026	Niki Volos	19	(3)
2026–	Nestos Chrysoupoli	0	(0)
- * Club domestic league appearances and goals as of 22 March 2026

Petros Giakoumakis (Greek: Πέτρος Γιακουμάκης; born 3 July 1992) is a Greek professional footballer who plays as a forward for Super League 2 club Nestos Chrysoupoli.

== Career ==
Born in Crete, Giakoumakis began playing football for Olympiakos Chersonissos and started his professional career after moving to Atsalenios in 2011. During his last season with the club Petros Giakoumakis scored 19 goals in 25 appearances, however his contribution was not enough for Atsalenios to remain in the Football League 2 and were relegated to the Heraklion FCA championships for the first time in 18 years.

His good performances with Atsalenios did not go unnoticed by a number of Super League clubs, with Panionios and OFI showing interest in signing the young forward for the summer transfer period of 2014. Platanias also invited him for a few-days-long trial in order to be checked out by then-Platanias manager Giannis Christopoulos. OFI was close enough to capture the forward's signature, but negotiations between Atsalenios and OFI bitterly fell through – in the end, Giakoumakis signed a five-year contract for Levadiakos on 1 August 2014.

On 8 June 2019, Giakoumakis joined Atromitos, signing a contract until the summer of 2021, on a free transfer. On 6 October, he scored his first goal for Atromitos in a 3–2 away win against Volos. He scored a last-minute winner from Clarck N'Sikulu's assist at home to OFI on 24 November. He then scored another last-minute winner against Panetolikos away from home, on 11 January 2020.

On 16 September 2021, Giakoumakis joined Veria, signing a one-year contract, on a free transfer.

In subsequent years, Giakoumakis transferred to multiple clubs, including PAS Lamia (2022), Ionikos FC (2023), Makedonikos (2024), and Punjab FC (2025). Each move was either on a free transfer or following loan spells, showcasing his adaptability across Greek and international football markets.

== Career statistics ==
As of 2 April 2026

Club	Season	League			Cup		Continental		Other		Total	
Club	Season	Division	Apps	Goals	Apps	Goals	Apps	Goals	Apps	Goals	Apps	Goals
Levadiakos	2014–15	Super League Greece	16	1	4	0	—		—		20	1
Levadiakos	2015–16	Super League Greece	25	7	4	1	—		—		29	8
Levadiakos	2016–17	Super League Greece	27	6	3	2	—		—		30	8
Levadiakos	2017–18	Super League Greece	29	7	4	1	—		—		33	8
Levadiakos	2018–19	Super League Greece	20	1	1	0	—		—		21	1
Levadiakos	Total		117	22	16	4	—		—		133	26
Atromitos	2019–20	Super League Greece	23	3	2	0	0	0	—		25	3
Atromitos	2020–21	Super League Greece	12	0	0	0	—		—		12	0
Atromitos	Total		35	3	2	0	0	0	—		37	3
Veria	2021–22	Super League Greece 2	35	8	1	0	—		—		36	8
Lamia	2022–23	Super League Greece	14	0	4	0	—		—		18	0
Olympiakos Nicosia (loan)	2022–23	Cypriot First Division	14	0	2	0	—		—		16	0
Ionikos	2023–24	Super League Greece 2	29	6	0	0	—		—		29	6
Makedonikos	2023–24	Super League Greece 2	11	7	0	0	—		—		11	7
Punjab	2024–25	Indian Super League	10	1	2	0	—		—		12	1
Niki Volos	2025–26	Super League Greece 2	19	3	1	0	—		—		19	3
Career total			284	50	28	4	0	0	0	0	311	54
