= Theodoros Vasilakakis =

Greek footballer (born 1988)

Thodoris Vasilakakis
Personal information
- Date of birth: 20 July 1988 (age 38)
- Place of birth: Thessaloniki, Greece
- Height: 1.83 m (6 ft 0 in)
- Position: Attacking midfielder

Senior career*
Years	Team	Apps	(Gls)
2007–2009	Veria	25	(1)
2009–2017	Xanthi	185	(14)
2017–2019	Atromitos	40	(5)
2019–2020	Anorthosis	11	(1)
2020–2021	Lamia	21	(1)
2021–2022	Chania	16	(0)
2022–2023	Lamia	1	(0)
- * Club domestic league appearances and goals as of 20:00, 29 December 2022 (UTC).

Theodoros Vasilakakis (Greek: Θεόδωρος Βασιλακάκης; born 20 July 1988) is a Greek professional footballer who plays as an attacking midfielder.

== Career ==
Born in Thessaloniki, Vasilakakis began playing professional football with Veria under manager John Mantzourakis. He played for the club from 2007 until 2009, when the team was relegated and he was given a free transfer.

In August 2009, Vasilakakis signed a four-year contract with Xanthi on the recommendation of Giannis Matzourakis. The club came to an agreement with Veria, which agreed to release the 21-year-old midfielder, who attracted the interest of both Aris and Bochum.

=== Atromitos ===
On 3 July 2017, after 7 years with Xanthi, he joined Atromitos on a two years' contract for an undisclosed fee. He made his debut for the club in a 1–1 home draw against Apollon Smyrnis, on 21 August 2017. On 4 December 2017, he scored two astonishing goals, helping his team to a 3–1 away win against Platanias. On 16 December 2017, he scored in a 3–1 away win against Kerkyra. Four days later, his goal gave his team an important 1–0 away win against Asteras Tripolis for the first leg of the round of 16 of the Greek Cup. On 8 February 2018, he scored in a 3–1 home loss against PAOK for the quarter-finals of the Greek Cup, which led to the team's elimination from the semi-finals. On 11 February 2018, he scored in a 2–2 home draw against Olympiacos. At the end of the 2017–18 season Maccabi Haifa and two other Israeli teams expressed interest in the signature of Vasilakakis, who impressed with his performances, scoring 6 goals and giving 1 assist, but no official offer was ever made to the administration of the club.

On 29 September 2018, he scored his first goal in the 2018–19 season in a 2–0 away win against Levadiakos.

=== Later years ===
On 28 May 2019, he moved to Anorthosis on a two-year deal. On 25 September 2020, he joined Lamia on a free transfer. On On 3 August 2021, he joined Super League Greece 2 club Chania FC on a free transfer. On 1 January 2022, Vasilakakis officially announced from Super League Greece 2 club Kavala F.C. on a free transfer.

== Career statistics ==
=== Club ===
As of 29 December 2021

Club	Season	League			Cup		Continental		Other		Total	
Club	Season	Division	Apps	Goals	Apps	Goals	Apps	Goals	Apps	Goals	Apps	Goals
Veria	2007–08	Super League Greece	6	0	—		—		—		6	0
Veria	2008–09	Super League Greece 2	20	1	3	0	—		—		23	1
Veria	2009–10	Super League Greece	—		1	0	—		—		1	0
Veria	Total		26	1	4	0	—		—		30	1
Xanthi	2009–10	Super League Greece	9	0	2	0	—		—		12	0
Xanthi	2010–11	Super League Greece	23	1	1	0	—		—		24	1
Xanthi	2011–12	Super League Greece	26	4	1	1	—		—		27	5
Xanthi	2012–13	Super League Greece	22	1	3	0	—		—		25	1
Xanthi	2013–14	Super League Greece	25	1	2	0	4	0	—		31	1
Xanthi	2014–15	Super League Greece	30	1	9	1	—		—		39	2
Xanthi	2015–16	Super League Greece	22	0	1	0	—		—		23	0
Xanthi	2016–17	Super League Greece	28	6	5	0	—		—		31	6
Xanthi	Total		185	14	24	2	4	0	—		213	16
Atromitos	2017–18	Super League Greece	28	4	5	2	—		—		33	6
Atromitos	2018–19	Super League Greece	12	1	3	1	2	0	—		17	2
Atromitos	Total		40	5	8	3	2	0	—		50	8
Anorthosis	2019–20	Cypriot First Division	11	1	3	1	—		—		14	2
Lamia	2020–21	Super League Greece	21	1	2	0	—		—		23	1
Chania	2021–22	Super League Greece 2	8	0	0	0	—		—		8	0
Career total			291	22	41	6	6	0	0	0	338	28

== Honours ==
Xanthi

- Greek Cup runner-up: 2014–15
