= Georgios Nikas =

Greek footballer

Giorgos Nikas
Personal information
- Date of birth: 17 September 1999 (age 27)
- Place of birth: Thiva, Greece
- Height: 1.88 m (6 ft 2 in)
- Position: Midfielder

Team information
- Current team: Levadiakos
- Number: 8

Youth career
- 2005–2015: Pelopidas Thiva
- 2015–2017: Levadiakos

Senior career*
Years	Team	Apps	(Gls)
2017–2023	Levadiakos	105	(9)
2023–2026	Panathinaikos	5	(0)
2023–2024	→ Levadiakos (loan)	21	(7)
2026–	Levadiakos	16	(1)
- * Club domestic league appearances and goals as of 20 September 2026

Georgios Nikas (Greek: Γεώργιος Νίκας; born 17 September 1999) is a Greek professional footballer who plays as a midfielder for Super League club Levadiakos.

== Career ==
On 11 September 2023, Nikas joined Panathinaikos and signed a contract until 2027. Following the agreement, Nikas was loaned out to Levadiakos for 1 year.

== Career statistics ==
=== Club ===
As of 26 May 2024

Club	Season	League			Cup		Continental		Total	
Club	Season	Division	Apps	Goals	Apps	Goals	Apps	Goals	Apps	Goals
Levadiakos	2017–18	Super League Greece	6	0	2	1	—		8	1
Levadiakos	2018-19	Super League Greece	4	0	1	0	—		5	0
Levadiakos	2019–20	Super League Greece 2	14	1	0	0	—		14	1
Levadiakos	2020–21	Super League Greece 2	26	1	0	0	—		26	1
Levadiakos	2021-22	Super League Greece 2	25	1	3	1	—		28	2
Levadiakos	2022–23	Super League Greece	30	6	3	1	—		33	7
Levadiakos (loan)	2023-24	Super League Greece 2	21	7	4	1	—		25	9
Career total			126	16	13	4	0	0	139	20

== Honours ==
Levadiakos

- Super League Greece 2: 2021–22
