= Michalis Manias =

Greek footballer

Personal information
- Full name: Michalis Manias
- Date of birth: 20 February 1990 (age 36)
- Place of birth: Rhodes, Greece
- Height: 1.89 m (6 ft 2 1/2 in)
- Position: Striker

Team information
- Current team: Athens Kallithea
- Number: 33

Senior career*
Years	Team	Apps	(Gls)
2009–2012	Rouf	41	(12)
2011	→ Glyfada (loan)	0	(0)
2012–2013	Apollon Smyrnis	39	(18)
2013–2014	Aris	31	(7)
2014–2016	PAS Giannina	56	(18)
2016–2017	Westerlo	14	(2)
2017–2019	Asteras Tripolis	74	(26)
2019–2020	Pogoń Szczecin	14	(0)
2019	Pogoń Szczecin II	2	(2)
2020–2021	Anorthosis	27	(4)
2022	Olympiakos Nicosia	8	(0)
2022	Kitchee	3	(2)
2023–2025	Diagoras	68	(19)
2025	Apollon Kalythies	11	(5)
2026–	Athens Kallithea	13	(7)

International career
2009	Rhodes	2	(2)
2018	Greece	1	(0)
- * Club domestic league appearances and goals as of 20 September 2026

Michalis Manias (Greek: Μιχάλης Μανιάς; born 20 February 1990) is a Greek professional footballer who plays as a striker for Super League 2 club Athens Kallithea. Besides Greece, he has played in Hong Kong, Cyprus, Poland, and Belgium.

== Club career ==
Manias started his career in AE Moschatou and in Rouf, before being transferred to Apollon Smyrnis.

After an impressive 2012–13 season scoring 18 times, he signed for Aris. At Aris, it took him 13 match days to score his first goal, the equalizer in a 2–2 draw with Panthrakikos. Manias finished the season with 7 goals and 1 assist in 33 games. He was considered as one of team's best players in a season where they managed to collect enough points to stay in the Super League. At the end of the season Manias was released two years early from the end of his contract because Aris self relegated them self to the 3rd division and he requested to have his contract terminated, as he wanted to continue playing in the top division.

Manias signed a two-year contract with PAS Giannina. He scored his first goal in the 12th round against Niki Volos, also getting an assist in the same game. He had many good performances during the year like scoring against PAOK, a brace against Panthrakikos and the winner over Olympiacos. Manias was considered a major hit at PAS Giannina with 9 goals and 2 assist in 34 games. Manias started the 2015–16 campaign as the leader of the club's offence. At the end of the season he had 10 goals and 3 assists, attracting the interest of the German club Augsburg with his contract expiring at the end of season.

On 8 June 2016, Manias signed a two-year contract with Belgian Pro League club Westerlo for an undisclosed fee. On 13 August 2016, he scored his first goal with the club in a 2–1 home loss against Eupen.

=== Asteras Tripolis ===
On 30 December 2016, after just six months at the club, he was released from his contract by Westerlo and returned to Greece Asteras Tripolis. On 4 January 2017, he made his debut with the club as a starter in a 2–1 way loss against champions Olympiacos. On 5 April 2017, he netted a hat-trick, including one penalty, against AEL, helping his club to a 4–1 away win in their effort to avoid relegation. On 23 April 2017, in a crucial Super League game against Veria, he netted a second hat-trick in a month, but he didn't not succeed to help his club to acquire a positive result, as they faced a 4–3 away loss. On 16 September 2017, he opened the score, in a 1–1 away draw against champions Olympiacos. It was his first goal for the 2017–18 season. On 1 October 2017, he scored the second goal sealing a 2–0 home win against AEK Athens, the first in the 2017–18 season. On 2 December 2017, he scored a brace being the MVP of the game sealing a 4–0 home win against Kerkyra, and a week later he scored a goal in a 3–1 away win against Apollon Smyrnis. On 14 January 2018, he scored a brace in a 3–1 home win game against AEL. On 10 March 2018, Manias put the visitors, who beat high-flying PAOK 3–2 last weekend, ahead in the 69th minute in a 1–1 away draw against Panathinaikos. On 2 April he opened the score in a 4–0 home win game against Platanias, helping his club in its effort to win a ticket to the next year's Europa League. On 22 April 2018, Manias scored a brace sealing a 3–1 away win against Kerkyra in the battle to win a UEFA Europa League ticket against rivals Xanthi. On 5 May 2018, in a comfortable 2–0 away victory over Panetolikos, the Greek marksman scored and his 12th league goal of what has been an incredible season, as Asteras Tripolis participated in the UEFA Europa League qualifiers of the next season.

On 22 September 2018, Manias helped the club to collect their first points of the fledgling 2018–19 season after seeing off fellow early strugglers Apollon Smyrnis 2–0 at the Theodoros Kolokotronis stadium, by scoring with a wonderful kick after Martín Tonso's assist. It was his first goal for the season. On 6 October 2018, he opened the score in a 1–1 home draw against Panathinaikos. On 22 October 2018, he scored in a 3–2 away loss against Atromitos. On 24 November 2018, in new coach Georgios Paraschos’ debut, Manias scored a goal in the last minute of the game sealing a vital 2–0 home win game in his club's effort to avoid relegation.

=== Pogoń Szczecin ===
On 17 May 2019, Manias signed a three years' contract with Ekstraklasa club Pogoń Szczecin for an undisclosed fee.

=== Anorthosis ===
On 19 August 2020, Manias signed contract with Cypriot Club Anorthosis Famagusta.

=== Olympiakos Nicosia ===
On 7 January 2022, Manias signed a contract with Olympiakos Nicosia un til the end of the 2021–22 season.

=== Kitchee ===
On 28 September 2022, Manias signed a contract with Hong Kong Premier League club Kitchee. He scored 2 goals in his first two appearances for Kitchee, one in Hong Kong Premier League and one in Sapling Cup group stage.

On 31 December 2022, Manias left the club.

== International career ==
Manias represented the Rhodes national team at the 2009 Island Games, and he made his debut for Rhodes on 28 June 2009 during a 2–0 win against the Isle of Wight. He scored his only two goals for Rhodes during the fifth place play off during a 4–0 win against Ynys Môn.

On 15 May 2018, he made his debut with the Greece national team in a 2–0 friendly loss game against Saudi Arabia.

== Career statistics ==
As of 30 June 2022

Appearances and goals by club, season and competition
Club	Season	League			National cup (Note: Includes Greek Cup, Belgian Cup, Polish Cup, Cypriot Cup)		Continental		Other		Total	
Club	Season	Division	Apps	Goals	Apps	Goals	Apps	Goals	Apps	Goals	Apps	Goals
Apollon Smyrnis	2012–13	Super League Greece 2	39	18	5	2	—		—		44	20
Aris	2013–14	Super League Greece	31	7	2	0	—		—		33	7
PAS Giannina	2014–15	Super League Greece	28	8	5	1	—		—		33	9
PAS Giannina	2015–16	Super League Greece	28	10	2	0	—		—		30	10
PAS Giannina	Total		56	18	7	1	—		—		63	19
Westerlo	2016–17	Belgian First Division A	14	2	1	0	—		—		15	2
Asteras Tripolis	2016–17	Super League Greece	18	10	1	0	—		—		19	10
Asteras Tripolis	2017–18	Super League Greece	28	12	3	0	—		—		31	12
Asteras Tripolis	2018–19	Super League Greece	28	4	4	1	2 (Note: Appearances in UEFA Europa League)	0	—		34	5
Asteras Tripolis	Total		74	26	8	1	2	0	—		84	27
Pogoń Szczecin	2019–20	Ekstraklasa	14	0	1	0	—		—		15	0
Anorthosis	2020–21	Cypriot First Division	27	4	3	1	—		—		30	5
Olympiakos Nicosia	2021–22	Cypriot First Division	8	0	2	0	—		—		10	0
Career total			263	75	29	5	2	0	0	0	294	80

=== International ===
Appearances and goals by national team and year
National team	Year	Apps	Goals
Rhodes	2009	2	2
Total		2	2
Greece	2018	1	0
Total		1	0

Scores and results list Rhodes' goal tally first, score column indicates score after each Manias goal.

List of international goals scored by Michalis Manias
No.	Date	Venue	Cap	Opponent	Score	Result	Competition	Ref.
1	3 July 2009	Solvallen, Eckerö, Åland	2	Ynys Môn	3–0	4–0	2009 Island Games	
2	3 July 2009	Solvallen, Eckerö, Åland	2	Ynys Môn	4–0	4–0	2009 Island Games	

== Honours ==
Anorthosis

- Cypriot Cup: 2020–21
