= Marios Vichos =

Greek footballer

Personal information
- Full name: Marios Panagiotis Vichos
- Date of birth: 14 January 2000 (age 26)
- Place of birth: Itea, Phocis, Greece
- Height: 1.80 m (5 ft 11 in)
- Position: Left-back

Team information
- Current team: Levadiakos
- Number: 3

Youth career
- –2016: Asteras Iteas
- 2016–2018: Levadiakos

Senior career*
Years	Team	Apps	(Gls)
2018–	Levadiakos	167	(10)
2019	→ Amvrysseas (loan)	6	(0)

International career^{‡}
2022	Greece U21	1	(0)
- * Club domestic league appearances and goals as of 20 September 2026 ‡ National team caps and goals as of 6 June 2022

Marios Vichos (Greek: Μάριος Βήχος; born 14 January 2000) is a Greek professional footballer who plays as a left-back for Super League club Levadiakos.

== Honours ==
Levadiakos

- Super League 2: 2021–22
