= Sotiris Antoniou =

Greek footballer (born 1975)

Personal information
- Full name: Sotirios Antoniou
- Date of birth: 10 September 1975 (age 51)
- Place of birth: Larissa, Greece
- Height: 1.81 m (5 ft 11 in)
- Position: Defensive midfielder

Youth career
- 1995–1997: Apollon Larissa

Senior career*
Years	Team	Apps	(Gls)
1997–2001	Xanthi	80	(1)
2001–2002	Apollon Kalamarias	23	(0)
2002–2003	Fostiras	4	(0)
2003	Ethnikos Asteras	12	(2)
2003–2005	Kerkyra	45	(0)
2005–2006	PAS Giannina	11	(0)
2006	Trikala	8	(1)
2006–2007	Doxa Drama	8	(0)
2007	Trikala	10	(0)
2007–2008	Eordaikos 2007		
2008–2009	AEL Kalloni		

Managerial career
- 2010–2011: Eordaikos 2007
- 2011: AEL Kalloni
- 2011–2012: Paniliakos
- 2012–2013: Korinthos
- 2013: Panachaiki
- 2013: Paniliakos
- 2013–2015: Dotieas Agia
- 2015: Panargiakos
- 2015–2017: Sparta
- 2017–2018: Trikala
- 2018: AEL
- 2019: Lamia
- 2019–2021: Levadiakos
- 2021: Enosis Neon Paralimni
- 2021–2022: Rodos
- 2022: AEL
- 2022–2024: Panathinaikos B
- 2025: Panachaiki
- 2025–2026: Mykonos
- * Club domestic league appearances and goals

Sotiris Antoniou (Greek: Σωτήρης Αντωνίου; born 10 September 1975) is a Greek professional football manager and former player.

== Playing career ==
He began his career as a footballer from his hometown team Apollon Larissa in 1995. He played for almost 15 years for many historical clubs such as Xanthi, Doxa Drama, Kerkyra, Trikala, and Korinthos.

== Managerial career ==
He holds an UEFA Pro Coaching Licence.
