= Levadiakos F.C. =

Association football club in Greece

Levadiakos
- Full name: APO Levadiakos Football Club
- Nicknames: Γαλαζοπράσινοι (The Blue-Greens); Αυτοκράτορας της Στερεάς Ελλάδας (Emperor of Central Greece)
- Short name: APOL
- Founded: 20 July 1961; 65 years ago
- Ground: Levadia Municipal Stadium
- Capacity: 5,915
- Owner(s): Andreas Kolokythas; Konstantinos Kolokythas
- Chairman: Dimitrios Pantiskos
- Manager: Elias Charalambous
- League: Super League Greece
- 2025–26: Super League Greece, 6th of 14
- Website: levadiakosfc.gr
Home colours	Away colours

Levadiakos Football Club (officially romanized: Levadeiakos Greek: ΠΑΕ Λεβαδειακός) is a Greek professional football club that plays in the Super League Greece. Based in Livadeia, Greece, the club was promoted to the Alpha Ethniki, forerunner of the Super League, after ten seasons in minor divisions in the 2005–06 season, as runner-up of the Football League in 2004–05. It was then relegated to the Beta Ethniki again in 2006–07 and returned to the top tier in 2007–08. The club finished one level above relegation that year but was relegated back to the second division by finishing 14th in 2009–10. From 2011-2012 to 2018-2019 has played in Super League 1.The club most recently won promotion back into Super League Greece after winning the Super League Greece 2 in 2023–24. The next season the team played again in Super League 1 but finished in 14th place and were relegated. The subsequent season they won the Super League 2 and returned to Super League 1.

== History ==
Levadiakos started in 1961, when local clubs Trofonios and Pallevadiaki merged into a greater club. Straight after, Levadiakos played in the second division being close to relegation in almost every season. In the 1980s, the team was upgraded and in May 1987, players and supporters of the club celebrated the team's first ever promotion to Alpha Ethniki following a career great season by Konstantinos "Prince" Litinas. Levadiakos stayed there only for four seasons, returning again only in 1994 and 1995. After their second relegation, Levadiakos declined and went very lower, even struggling to clinch promotion to the 3rd division of Greece. But once more, everything changed suddenly and the team reached again the Greek Super League after ten years, in 2005, but was immediately relegated. In the next summer, Levadiakos bought many expensive players and appointed Georgi Vasilev as manager. Vasiliev achieved to get the team to the Super League once again, and in the 2007–08 season he struggled, but managed to avoid going down again. Nevertheless, he resigned from the club and he was succeeded by Momčilo Vukotić.

== Crest and colours ==
The club's crest has blue and green vertical stripes inspired by the great Konstantinos "Prince" Litinas. It comes from the colours of Pallevadiaki (green) and Trofonio (blue), the clubs that joined in order to establish Levadiakos. The colour common to both teams was white, which was also the basic colour of the group in the early years of its foundation.

== Stadium ==
Levadiakos' stadium was built in 1952. The stadium is located in Livadeia, about 130 km north-west of Athens. The stadium itself is located on the south side of Livadeia.

== Seasons in the 21st Century ==
Season	Category	Position	Cup
2000–01	Delta Ethniki (4th division)	4th	—
2001–02	Delta Ethniki (4th division)	1st	—
2002–03	Gamma Ethniki (3rd division)	3rd	1R
2003–04	Beta Ethniki (2nd division)	8th	2R
2004–05	Beta Ethniki (2nd division)	2nd	2R
2005–06	Alpha Ethniki (1st division)	14th	4R
2006–07	Beta Ethniki (2nd division)	2nd	4R
2007–08	Super League (1st division)	11th	4R
2008–09	Super League (1st division)	13th	4R
2009–10	Super League (1st division)	14th	5R
2010–11	Football League (2nd division)	4th	2R
2011–12	Super League (1st division)	7th	4R
2012–13	Super League (1st division)	11th	QF
2013–14	Super League (1st division)	9th	2R
2014–15	Super League (1st division)	14th	3R
2015–16	Super League (1st division)	10th	3R
2016–17	Super League (1st division)	14th	3R
2017–18	Super League (1st division)	10th	R16
2018–19	Super League (1st division)	15th	GS
2019–20	Super League 2 (2nd Division)	4th	4R
2020–21	Super League 2 (2nd Division)	3rd	—
2021–22	Super League 2 (2nd Division)	1st	R16
2022–23	Super League (1st division)	14th	R16
2023–24	Super League 2 (2nd Division)	1st	R16
2024–25	Super League (1st division)	9th	4R
2025–26	Super League (1st division)	**6th**	SF

Best position in bold.

Key: 1R = First Round, 2R = Second Round, 3R = Third Round, 4R = Fourth Round, 5R = Fifth Round, GS = Group Stage, QF = Quarter-finals, SF = Semi-finals.

== Players ==
=== Current squad ===
As of 27 October 2026

Note: Flags indicate national team as defined under FIFA eligibility rules; some limited exceptions apply. Players may hold more than one non-FIFA nationality.

No.	Pos.	Nation	Player
2	DF	ROU	Alexandru Pantea (on loan from FCSB)
3	DF	GRE	Marios Vichos
4	DF	ENG	Jonathan Panzo
5	DF	SVK	Norbert Gyömbér
6	MF	EGY	Mohamed Elneny
7	MF	ARG	Juan Bauza
8	MF	GRE	Georgios Nikas
9	FW	SRB	Ognjen Ožegović
11	MF	ARG	Agustín Urzi (on loan from Universidad de Concepción)
12	GK	GRE	Stelios Vallindras
14	DF	GRE	Georgios Manthatis
15	MF	ROU	Adrian Șut (on loan from Al Ain)
17	MF	GRE	Dimitrios Emmanouilidis
18	MF	CYP	Ioannis Kosti
19	MF	GAM	Jallow Lamarana
20	MF	GRE	Konstantinos Goumas
21	MF	ESP	Mahamadou Balde (on loan from PAOK B)

No.	Pos.	Nation	Player
22	DF	GRE	Taxiarchis Filon
23	DF	GRE	Georgios Kornezos
24	DF	GRE	Panagiotis Liagas (captain)
25	FW	SEN	Aliou Badji
27	FW	ARG	Gregorio Rodríguez (on loan from Melgar)
30	MF	ROU	Octavian Popescu (on loan from FCSB)
31	FW	GRE	Panagiotis Symelidis
33	GK	BRA	Lucas Anacker
37	DF	GRE	Giannis Tsivelekidis
55	GK	ISR	Niv Eliasi (on loan from Hapoel Be'er Sheva)
66	MF	SEN	Mohamed Ndiaye
75	GK	GRE	Apostolos Tsilingiris
77	MF	GRE	Georgios Vrakas
95	DF	GRE	Nikolaos Tsaras
99	FW	NGR	Moses Cobnan (on loan from Krasnodar)

=== Out on loan ===
Note: Flags indicate national team as defined under FIFA eligibility rules; some limited exceptions apply. Players may hold more than one non-FIFA nationality.

No.	Pos.	Nation	Player
16	GK	ARG	Ramiro Macagno (at Independiente Rivadavia until 31 December 2026)

=== Records and statistics ===
Information correct as of the match played on 20 September 2026. Bold denotes an active player for the club.
The tables refer to Levadiakos' players in Super League Greece, Greek Football Cup, Second Division Greece, Third Division Greece and Delta Ethniki.

==== Top 10 most capped players ====
Rank	Player	Years	App
1	(Greece) Georgios Zisopoulos	2005–2010, 2011–2013, 2018–2019	226
2	(Greece) Thanasis Moulopoulos	2007–2014, 2015–2017	224
3	(Greece) **Panagiotis Liagas**	2018–	198
4	(Greece) **Marios Vichos**	2018–	184
5	(Greece) Giannis Martineos	1977–1997	174
6	(Greece) Triantafyllos Tsapras	2019–2026	167
7	(Greece) Michalis Bletsas	1987–1995	162
8	(Greece) Kostas Tsanas	1985–1995	160
9	(Greece) **Panagiotis Symelidis**	2019–2021, 2022–	160
10	(Greece) **Giorgos Nikas**	2017–2024, 2026–	158

==== Top 10 goalscorers ====
Rank	Player	Years	Goals
1	(Greece) Vangelis Mantzios	2013–2017, 2019–2020	42
2	(Italy) Stefano Napoleoni	2009–2013	27
3	(Greece) Petros Giakoumakis	2014–2019	26
4	(Greece) Stelios Vasiliou	2008–2014, 2016–2018	25
5	(Greece) Takis Lemonis	1987–1991	24
6	(Greece) Dimos Kavouras	1987–1989	23
7	(Greece) Giorgos Barkoglou (Brazil) Lucas Poletto	2009–2011; 2020–2022, 2023–2024	22
8	(Greece) Kostas Tsanas	1985–1995	21
9	(Greece) **Giorgos Nikas**	2017–2024, 2026–	21
10	(Greece) Michalis Ziogas	1989–1990	18

== Honours ==
- Super League 2
  - Winners (2): 2021–22, 2023–24
- Gamma Ethniki
  - Winners (2): 1965–66, 1981–82
- Delta Ethniki
  - Winners (1): 2001–02
- Euboea–Boeotia FCA Championship
  - Winners (1): 1961–62
- Boeotia FCA Cup
  - Winners (1): 2000–01

== Retired Numbers ==
- 10 - Dedicated for the club owner, Giannis Kombotis

== Managerial history ==
- (Greece) Takis Lemonis (1 July 2005 – 30 June 2006)
- (Greece) Sakis Tsiolis (2006–07)
- (Bulgaria) Georgi Vasilev (1 July 2007 – 3 March 2008)
- (Serbia) Momčilo Vukotić (1 July 2008 – 23 September 2009)
- (Spain) Quique Hernández (Sept 25, 2009 – 1 March 2010)
- (Greece) Dimitrios Farantos (1 March 2010 – 17 September 2010)
- (Greece) Vasilis Vouzas (Sept 17, 2010 – 16 March 2011)
- (Greece) Giannis Papakostas (16 March 2011 – 20 August 2011)
- (Greece) Georgios Paraschos (28 August 2011 – 22 March 2013)
- (Bosnia and Herzegovina) Jasminko Velić (22 March 2013 – 25 April 2013)
- (Greece) Takis Lemonis (18 May 2013 – 14 October 2013)
- (Greece) Dimitrios Farantos (14 October 2013 – 21 October 2013)
- (Greece) Nikos Karageorgiou (21 October 2013 – 11 February 2014)
- (Greece) Savvas Pantelidis (12 February 2014 – 9 February 2015)
- (Greece) Akis Mantzios (9 February 2015 – 10 June 2016)
- (Serbia) Ratko Dostanić (15 June 2016 – 5 January 2017)
- (Greece) Giannis Christopoulos (7 January 2017 – 21 February 2017)
- (Greece) Dimitrios Farantos (14 March 2017 – 30 June 2017)
- (France) José Anigo (30 June 2017 – 9 May 2018)
- (Greece) Akis Mantzios (7 June 2018 – 22 October 2018)
- (Italy) Giuseppe Sannino (22 October 2018 – 21 January 2019)
- (Greece) Nikos Karageorgiou (22 January 2019 – 11 May 2019)
- (Greece) Dimitrios Spanos (3 July 2019 – 28 October 2019)
- (Greece) Sotiris Antoniou (28 October 2019 – 24 February 2021)
- (Italy) Giuseppe Sannino (24 February 2021 – 11 May 2021)
- (Greece) Sokratis Ofrydopoulos (11 May 2021 – 30 June 2021)
- (Greece) Giannis Taousianis (1 July 2021 – 22 September 2022)
- (Bosnia and Herzegovina) Jasminko Velić (Sept 22, 2022 – 15 February 2023)
- (Greece) Giannis Petrakis (16 February 2023 – 30 June 2023)
- (Greece) Nikos Nioplias (1 July 2023 – 18 December 2023)
- (Greece) Sokratis Ofrydopoulos (19 December 2023 – 28 May 2024)
- (Greece) Nikos Papadopoulos (27 June 2024 – 30 June 2026)
- (Cyprus) Elias Charalambous (1 July 2026 - present)

== Personnel ==
=== Technical staff ===
Position	Staff
Head coach	(Cyprus) Elias Charalambous
Assistant coach	(Cyprus) Christodoulos Christodoulou
Fitness coach	(Greece) Konstantinos Tsioumpris
Goalkeeper coach	(Greece) Giannis Zalaoras
Analyst	(Greece) Giannis Abatzidis

=== Ownership and current board ===
Position	Staff
Owners	(Greece) Andreas Kolokythas (59.93%) (Greece) Konstantinos Kolokythas (10.60%)
President & CEO	(Greece) Dimitrios Pantiskos
Vice Presidents	(Greece) Konstantinos Kolokythas (Greece) Lampros Balokas
Board members	(Greece) Georgios Tsabis (Greece) Panagiota Kyriazi (Greece) Loukas Koutriaris (Greece) Maria Siabani

Source: Levadiakos F.C.
