= Steve Rutter (footballer, born 1962) =

English footballer and manager

Personal information
- Full name: Stephen L. Rutter
- Date of birth: 14 October 1962 (age 64)
- Place of birth: Northampton, England
- Position: Centre-back

Youth career
- Northampton Town

Senior career*
Years	Team	Apps	(Gls)
–1987	Wealdstone		
1987–1993	Yeovil Town	262	(9)
- Trowbridge Town

Managerial career
- 1991–1993: Yeovil Town (player-manager)
- Trowbridge Town (player-manager)
- 2004: San Juan Jabloteh
- 2013–2015: Panathinaikos (assistant)
- 2015: Panathinaikos (caretaker)
- 2016–2017: Roda JC Kerkrade (fitness coach)
- 2017: Yeovil Town (academy head of coaching)
- 2017: KV Kortrijk (assistant)
- 2018: Yeovil Town (academy head of coaching)
- 2018–2019: Luton Town (assistant)
- 2019: Atromitos (assistant)
- 2021–2022: Panetolikos (assistant)
- 2024–2026: Omonia FC (academy technical director)
- 2026–: Poole Town (assistant)
- * Club domestic league appearances and goals

Stephen L. Rutter (born 14 October 1962) is an English former football player and current Assistant Manager at Poole Town.

== Playing career ==
=== Early career at Wealdstone ===
Rutter was born in Northampton in 1962, and after leaving school, he spent seven years working for the police force. Rutter came to semi-professional football relatively late joining Wealdstone and was part of the side who won the Alliance Premier League and FA Trophy double in 1985.

=== Yeovil Town ===
Rutter followed his former Wealdstone manager Brian Hall to Isthmian League side Yeovil Town in January 1987, and made 12 appearances in the second half of the season. In his first full season in Somerset, Rutter won the Western Gazette merit mark award player of the year as Yeovil won the Isthmian League and Isthmian League Cup double. Yeovil's return to the Football Conference saw them finish 9th, the club's highest finish for a decade, Rutter made 55 appearances in all competitions and again won the Western Gazette merit mark award player of the year. The following season saw Yeovil lift the Conference League Cup trophy, in the club's final season at the Huish Athletic Ground, with Rutter having the honour of being the final player to touch the ball at the ground.

Yeovil's first season at Huish Park in 1990–91, Rutter applied to be transfer listed while he was shortlisted for the first team manager role at Dorchester Town, in March 1991, Rutter was made Yeovil's captain.

Rutter was still a regular in the side as player-manager and upon his departure from Yeovil in 1993, he had made 247 appearances and scored 11 times.

== Coaching career ==
=== Yeovil Town ===
On 1 April 1991 after a 2–1 win over Sutton United the club parted company with manager Clive Whitehead, and Rutter was appointed as manager initially in a caretaker capacity with brief to avoid relegation. Rutter was Yeovil's fourth manager of the season, and his reign started with 7–2 victory over Slough Town, he managed to keep the club up with two matches to spare. Rutter's time at Yeovil was blighted with the club suffering from severe financial difficulties after the Glovers move to Huish Park. His first full season in charge was brightened only by an FA Cup win at Football League side Walsall while league form was patchy. The 1992–93 season, saw Yeovil reach the third round of the FA Cup after defeating rivals Hereford United in a second round replay. The third round fixture against Premier League side Arsenal has been cited as a game which reputedly saved the club. The following season saw Yeovil complete another giantkilling after defeating Fulham, but in November 1993, Rutter stepped down as manager of Yeovil, and was succeeded by his former manager Brian Hall.

While manager of Yeovil, Rutter encouraged the board to set up the club's Youth Training Scheme programme.

=== Trowbridge Town ===
After leaving Yeovil went on to be player-manager Southern League side Trowbridge Town, but ultimately had to retire due to an ankle injury.

=== The Football Association ===
After leaving Trowbridge, Rutter initially worked for the Professional Footballers' Association, from whom he moved on to work with The Football Association as the FA's Regional Director of Coaching for the South-West. Ahead of UEFA Euro 2000, Rutter was one of ten experienced coaches and managers who FA Technical Director of Football Howard Wilkinson selected to aid England manager Kevin Keegan. The team were responsible for scouting England's group opponents and potential latter stage opponents to assess their tactics and highlight key players. Rutter's specific role was to watch and report back on matches in other groups, working in a sub-group of six people that included ex-Nottingham Forest manager Frank Clark as well was Rutter's fellow regional directors who represented the other areas of the country. At that time Rutter was also an assistant coach to the women's national team. Whilst he worked at the FA, Rutter was in charge of an England under-15 side that included future England captain Wayne Rooney.

=== San Juan Jabloteh ===
In 2002 after leaving the FA, Rutter was briefly involved in coaching at the CareerSports Soccer Academy in Florida, a project set up by former Liverpool footballer Mark Lawrenson. Additionally after leaving the FA he conducted coaching courses hosted by CONCACAF in 2002 and 2003 at the Joao Havelange Centre of Excellence in Macoya, Tunapuna, and these coaching courses brought him to Trinidad, in 2004 he was appointed manager of TT Pro League side San Juan Jabloteh briefly Rutter admitted when the offer from Jabloteh came it was a mind boggling decision to make, he was not only confronted with other offers, one of which would have seen him in charge of setting up a national coaching educational structure for China, but it would mean leaving England and coming to Trinidad leaving behind his wife Betty and two young children.

=== Return to the FA ===
After his sojourn in the Caribbean, Rutter returned to the Football Association as their educational manager, a role in which he was responsible for leading courses teaching coaches on both their FA coaching badges and UEFA Licences. In total Rutter spent nine years in the role of educational manager.

=== Panathinaikos ===
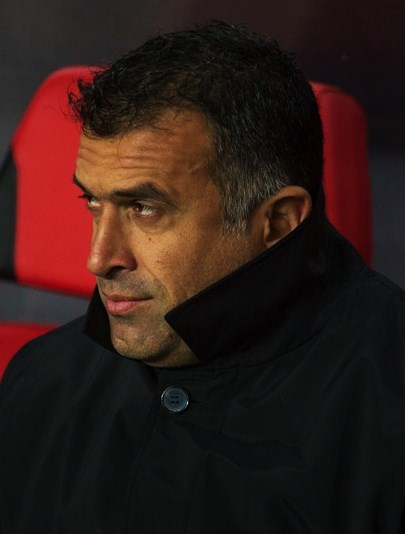
Rutter joined Yannis Anastasiou as his assistant manager at Panathinaikos.

Having previously taught Yannis Anastasiou on his UEFA B and A Licence courses and started him on his UEFA Pro Licence, Rutter joined him as his assistant manager at Greek Super League side Panathinaikos upon his appointment in May 2013. Having spent two years as assistant manager, in November 2015, following the sacking of Anastasiou, Rutter was appointed as caretaker manager of Panathinaikos. Managing the club against Atromitos, on 7 November 2015, he guided the club to a 2–1 away victory. Upon the appointment of Andrea Stramaccioni, on 9 November 2015, Rutter left the club.

=== Roda JC ===
Rutter then followed Anastasiou to Dutch Eredivisie side Roda JC Kerkrade as a fitness coach in July 2016, after six months in the role Rutter left on 1 January 2017 to return to England.

=== Return to Yeovil Town ===
On 31 January 2017, after leaving Roda, Rutter returned to Yeovil Town, now in League Two, as head of coaching in their academy.

=== KV Kortrijk ===
In June 2017, after only six months at Yeovil, Rutter left to once again link up with Anastasiou, becoming assistant manager at Belgian First Division A side KV Kortrijk. Rutter left Kortrijk following the sacking of Anastasiou in November, and returned to his role of head of coaching in Yeovil's academy until the end of the 2017–18 season.

=== Luton Town ===
On 1 October 2018, Rutter was appointed assistant manager to Nathan Jones at League One club Luton Town. He left the club in June 2019 to join his former Panathinaikos boss, Giannis Anastasiou at Greek Super League club, Atromitos FC as assistant coach.

== Honours ==
=== Player ===
Wealdstone

- Alliance Premier League: 1984–85
- FA Trophy: 1984–85

Yeovil Town

- Isthmian League: 1987–88
- Isthmian League Cup: 1987–88
- Isthmian Championship Shield: 1988–89
- Conference League Cup: 1989–90
