= Alekos Vosniadis =

Greek footballer (born 1961)

Personal information
- Full name: Alexandros Vosniadis
- Date of birth: 12 April 1961 (age 65)
- Place of birth: Thessaloniki, Greece

Team information
- Current team: Niki Volos (manager)

Managerial career
- Years: Team
- 1995–2000: Achilleas Triandria
- 2003–2006: Polykastro
- 2006–2008: Thermaikos
- 2008–2009: Eordaikos
- 2009–2012: Anagennisi Epanomis
- 2012–2013: Apollon Smyrnis
- 2014: Niki Volos
- 2014: AEL
- 2014–2015: Apollon Smyrnis
- 2015–2016: Kerkyra
- 2016: Veria
- 2017: Trikala
- 2017: Kerkyra
- 2018: Iraklis
- 2018–2021: Chania
- 2021–2022: Niki Volos
- 2023: Apollon Smyrnis
- 2023–2024: Athens Kallithea
- 2024–2025: AEL
- 2025–2026: Kalamata
- 2026: Panserraikos
- 2026–: Niki Volos

Alekos Vosniadis (Greek: Αλέκος Βοσνιάδης; born 12 April 1961) is a Greek professional football manager. He is the current mamager of Super League 2 club Niki Volos.

Vosniadis has won promotion to Super League 1, Greece's top division, on six occasions with Apollon Smyrnis, Niki Volos, Kerkyra, Athens Kallithea, AEL and Kalamata.

== Managerial career ==
Born in Thessaloniki, Vosniadis had a three-year tenure at local third division side Anagennisi Epanomi early into his managerial career, and he would lead Epanomi to promotion in the 2010/11 season, returning the club to the second division after a 29-year absence.

From Epanomi, Vosniadis moved to Apollon Smyrnis with immediate success, winning promotion to Super League 1 in the 2012/13 season.

In January 2014, Vosniadis took on Niki Volos midseason, and would help steer them to a second place finish in the 2013/14 season and promotion to Super League 1, bringing the club back to the top flight for the first time in 48 years.

Vosniadis would return to Apollon midway through the 2014/15 season with the club in the second division, narrowly missing out on promotion while making a run to the semi-finals of the 2014/15 Greek Cup where they were eliminated by Olympiacos.

In the 2015/16 season, Vosniadis would achieve his third promotion to the top division, this time with island side Kerkyra, finishing second in the table and edging out his former club Apollon. He would later return to the club in the middle of the 2017/18 Super League 1 season, earning 15 points from 16 league matches.

From 2018/19 through 2022/23, Vosniadis worked for Chania, Niki Volos, and Apollon in the second division, earning 52 wins and 33 draws from 116 league matches, equaling 1.63 points per match.

In July 2023, Vosniadis was appointed as manager of Athens Kallithea, eventually leading the team back to the first division for the first time in 18 years. In June 2024, AKFC announced that Vosniadis would not return for the following season, but thanked him for his "outstanding work."

For the 2024/2025 Super League season, Vosniadis coached AEL and helped them reach promotion by winning the championship for group A. After the season AEL decided to move on and Vosniadis was hired by Kalamata for the 2025/2026 season and he promoted the team in the first division after 25 years

== Managerial statistics ==
Team	From	To	Record				
Team	From	To	G	W	D	L	Win %
Achilleas Triandria	1 July 1995	30 June 2000					
Polykastro	1 July 2003	17 April 2006	88	35	24	29	39.77
Thermaikos Thermi	1 July 2006	6 September 2008	69	35	17	17	50.72
Eordaikos	10 October 2008	4 March 2009	29	14	12	3	48.28
Anagennisi Epanomi	1 July 2009	30 June 2012	104	48	28	28	46.15
Apollon Smyrnis	7 August 2012	7 October 2013	53	26	11	16	49.06
Niki Volos	17 January 2014	30 June 2014	25	16	4	5	64.00
AEL	1 July 2014	6 September 2014	1	0	0	1	0.00
Apollon Smyrnis	12 December 2014	2 November 2015	41	19	15	7	46.34
Kerkyra	25 November 2015	30 May 2016	27	19	4	4	70.37
Veria	9 July 2016	23 September 2016	2	0	0	2	0.00
Trikala	9 July 2016	8 March 2017	10	5	1	4	50.00
Kerkyra	31 August 2017	21 December 2017	16	3	6	7	18.75
Iraklis	5 September 2018	12 November 2018	6	3	1	2	50.00
Chania	18 December 2018	24 February 2021	53	24	15	14	45.28
Niki Volou	14 May 2021	12 December 2022	53	23	15	15	43.40
Apollon Smyrnis	17 February 2023	7 May 2023	10	5	3	2	50.00
Athens Kallithea	10 July 2023	30 June 2024	34	21	8	5	61.76
AEL	18 September 2024	15 April 2025	28	21	6	1	75.00
Kalamata	1 June 2025	7 March 2026	23	19	2	2	82.61
Panserraikos	1 July 2026	20 September 2026	6	2	0	4	33.33
Niki Volos	23 September 2026						
Total			678	338	172	168	49.85
