= Ratko Dostanić =

Serbian football manager and player

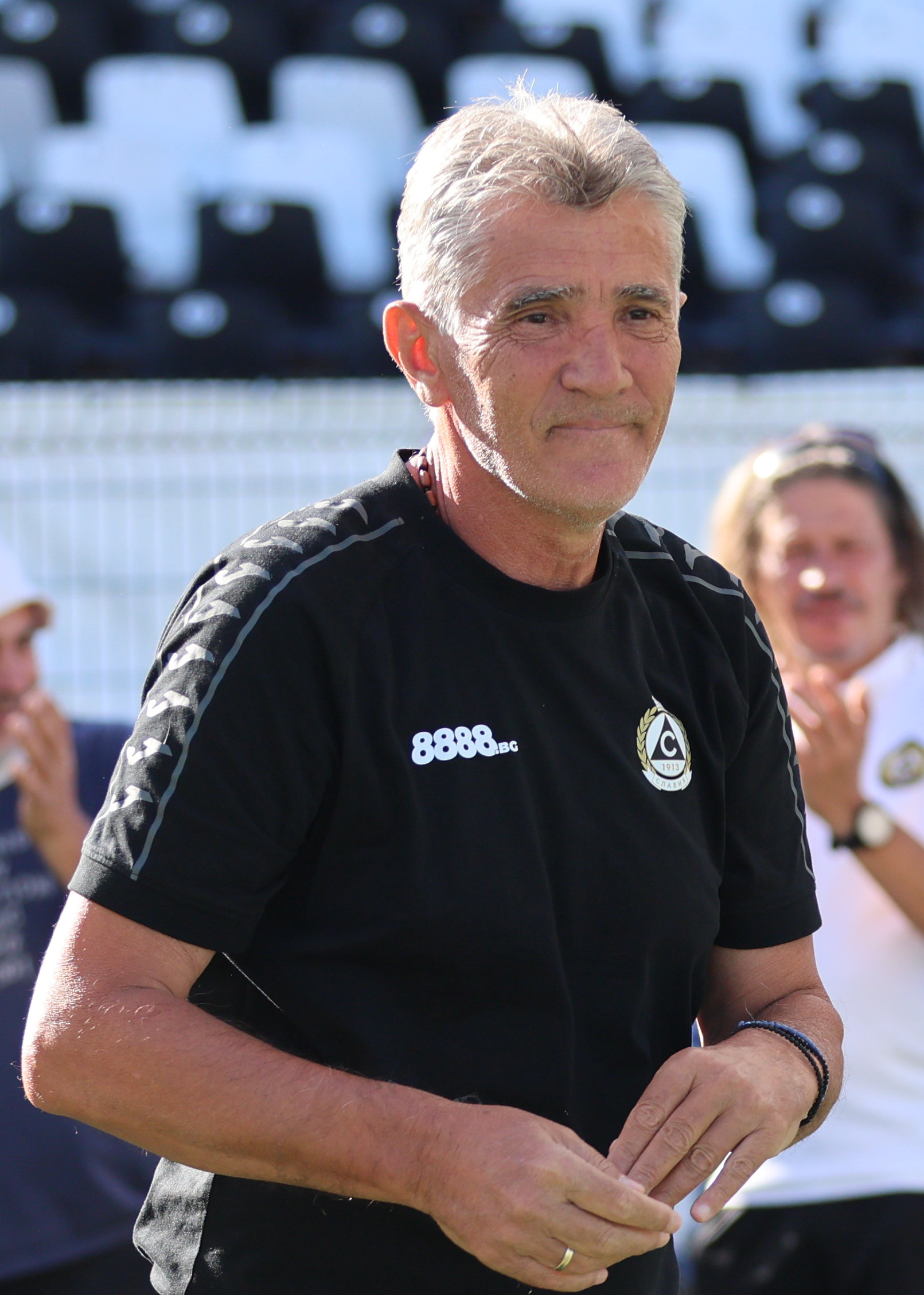

Personal information
- Date of birth: 25 October 1959 (age 67)
- Place of birth: Lučani, PR Serbia, FPR Yugoslavia
- Height: 1.84 m (6 ft 0 in)
- Position: Defender

Team information
- Current team: Slavia Sofia (manager)

Youth career
- Partizan

Senior career*
Years	Team	Apps	(Gls)
1980–1981	FAP		
1981–1983	Timok	58	(1)
1983–1986	Rad	87	(3)
1986–1987	Bourges		
1987–1988	Caen	24	(1)
1988–1990	Le Mans	34	(1)
1990–1992	Rodez	66	(2)
1992–1994	Red Star	70	(1)
1994–1995	Châtellerault		
1995–1996	Montluçon		
Total		339	(9)

Managerial career
- 1999–2000: Red Star Belgrade (assistant)
- 2000–2002: Obilić
- 2002: Levski Sofia (assistant)
- 2002–2003: Obilić
- 2003: Sartid Smederevo
- 2003–2004: Slavia Sofia
- 2004–2005: Red Star Belgrade
- 2006: Slavia Sofia
- 2006–2007: OFK Beograd
- 2007: Bežanija
- 2007: Bežanija
- 2007: Veria
- 2008: Dalian Shide
- 2008: Vardar
- 2008–2009: Srem
- 2009: Levski Sofia
- 2010: Red Star Belgrade
- 2011: Diagoras
- 2013: Zestafoni
- 2013–2014: Veria
- 2014–2015: CA Bizertin
- 2015–2016: Larissa
- 2016–2017: Levadiakos
- 2017: Veria
- 2018: Larissa
- 2018: Trikala
- 2018–2019: Niki Volos
- 2019: Zemun
- 2019–2020: Rabotnički
- 2021: Zeta
- 2023: CA Bizertin
- 2024: Diagoras
- 2024: GSP Polet Dorćol
- 2025: Lokomotiv Sofia
- 2025–: Slavia Sofia
- * Club domestic league appearances and goals

Ratko Dostanić (Serbian Cyrillic: Ратко Достанић; born 25 October 1959) is a Serbian football manager and former player.

== Playing career ==
After coming through the youth system of Partizan, Dostanić went on to play for Timok and Rad in the Yugoslav Second League, before moving abroad to France in 1986. He played for Bourges (1986–87), Caen (1987–88), Le Mans (1988–90), Rodez (1990–92), Red Star (1992–94), Châtellerault (1994–95) and Montluçon (1995–96).

== Managerial career ==
After serving as an assistant to Slavoljub Muslin at Red Star Belgrade, Dostanić was appointed as manager of fellow First League of FR Yugoslavia contender Obilić in November 2000. He eventually left the position in March 2002. In December 2002, Dostanić returned to Obilić. He left the club for the second time in May 2003. The next month, Dostanić agreed terms with Sartid Smederevo. He took over as manager of Bulgarian club Slavia Sofia in December 2003.

In late December 2006, Dostanić was appointed as manager of OFK Beograd. He announced his resignation on 1 April 2007 due to poor results. A few days after leaving OFK Beograd, Dostanić took charge of Serbian SuperLiga rivals Bežanija until the end of the season. He rejoined the club in late August 2007. From October to December 2007, Dostanić served as manager of Greek club Veria. He subsequently went to Asia and became manager of Chinese club Dalian Shide in early 2008.

In June 2008, Dostanić was hired as manager of Macedonian side Vardar. He decided to depart the club after Macedonia recognized the independence of Kosovo in October 2008. Shortly after leaving Macedonia, Dostanić was appointed as manager of Serbian First League club Srem in late October 2008. He stepped down from his position six months later.

On 23 July 2009, Dostanić was named new manager of Bulgarian champions Levski Sofia, replacing Emil Velev and signing a two-year contract. He remained in charge for less than three months. On 21 March 2010, Red Star Belgrade announced the appointment of Dostanić as manager. He replaced Vladimir Petrović despite the team's leading position in the league after 19 rounds. With Dostanić at the helm, Red Star Belgrade failed to win the title after three years, finishing as runners-up to arch-rivals Partizan. However, the team won the Serbian Cup, defeating Vojvodina in the final.

In November 2013, Dostanić returned to Veria as manager and remained in the post until May 2014. He subsequently served as manager of fellow Greek clubs Larissa (July 2015 to February 2016) and Levadiakos (June 2016 to January 2017). In February 2017, Dostanić made another return to Veria in an attempt to save the club from relegation in the remainder of the season.

== Honours ==
Levski Sofia

- Bulgarian Supercup: 2009

Red Star Belgrade

- Serbian Cup: 2009–10
