= Giannis Chatzinikolaou =

Greek footballer (born in 1965)

Personal information
- Full name: Ioannis Chatzinikolaou
- Date of birth: 30 January 1965 (age 61)
- Place of birth: Serres, Greece
- Height: 1.77 m (5 ft 10 in)
- Position: Defender

Senior career*
Years	Team	Apps	(Gls)
1985–1991	Aris		
1991–1996	Ionikos		

International career
- Greece U21

Managerial career
- 2004–2005: OFI
- 2007–2009: Ionikos
- 2009–2010: Egaleo
- 2010: OFI
- 2012: Platanias
- 2013: Iraklis
- 2013: Aris
- 2016: Panthrakikos
- 2016: Ergotelis
- 2018: Platanias
- 2022: Rodos
- * Club domestic league appearances and goals

Giannis Chatzinikolaou (Greek: Γιάννης Χατζηνικολάου; born 30 January 1965) is a Greek retired football player and manager. A defender, he was a squad member for the 1988 UEFA European Under-21 Championship.
