= José Manuel Roca =

Spanish footballer and manager

Personal information
- Full name: José Manuel Roca Cases
- Date of birth: 28 February 1976 (age 50)
- Place of birth: Orihuela, Spain
- Height: 1.87 m (6 ft 2 in)
- Position: Goalkeeper

Team information
- Current team: Panathinaikos F.C. (Analyst / Scout)

Youth career
- 1994–1995: Real Madrid

Senior career*
Years	Team	Apps	(Gls)
1995–1997	Real Madrid C	28	(0)
1997–1998	Real Madrid B	1	(0)
1998–1999	Murcia	15	(0)
1999–2000	Villarreal	0	(0)
2000–2001	Onda	2	(0)
2001–2002	Sabadell	7	(0)
2002–2003	Palamós	6	(0)
2003–2005	Novelda	67	(0)
2005–2006	Badajoz	13	(0)
2006–2008	Orihuela	44	(0)
2008–2010	Panthrakikos	33	(0)
2010–2011	Olympiacos Volos	3	(0)
2011–2012	Doxa Drama	7	(0)
2012–2013	Olympiacos Volos	0	(0)
Total		226	(0)

International career
1992–1993	Spain U17	4	(0)
1994	Spain U18	1	(0)

Managerial career
- 2013–2014: Olympiacos Volos
- 2014–2015: Panthrakikos
- 2015: Pafos
- 2016–2017: Orihuela
- 2017: SJK
- 2017–2018: Platanias
- 2018: Villanovense
- 2018–2019: Iraklis
- * Club domestic league appearances and goals

José Manuel Roca Cases (born 28 February 1976) is a Spanish retired footballer who played as a goalkeeper, and a manager.

== Football career ==
Born in Orihuela, Valencian Community, Roca only played lower league football in his country, representing Real Madrid C, Real Madrid Castilla, Real Murcia, CD Onda, CE Sabadell FC, Palamós CF, Novelda CF, CD Badajoz and Orihuela CF and appearing in 177 Segunda División B games over 11 seasons. In the 1999–2000 campaign he was part of Villarreal CF's roster, but failed to take part in any official matches as the club promoted to La Liga.

At already 32, Roca moved abroad, going on to spend the rest of his career in Greece where he played for Panthrakikos, Olympiacos Volos (two spells) and Doxa Drama, for a total of 43 Super League appearances. He retired in 2013 and immediately started coaching his last team, now in the second level.
