= Savvas Pantelidis =

Greek footballer & manager (born 1965)

Personal information
- Date of birth: 7 April 1965 (age 61)
- Place of birth: Athens, Greece
- Height: 1.80 m (5 ft 11 in)
- Position: Centre-back

Senior career*
Years	Team	Apps	(Gls)
1988–1997	Doxa Vyronas	201	(3)
1997–2002	Proodeftiki	57	(1)

Managerial career
- 2005–2006: Thrasyvoulos
- 2007–2008: Rodos
- 2008: Fostiras
- 2009: Kallithea
- 2010: Egaleo
- 2010: Trikala
- 2010–2011: Ethnikos Piraeus
- 2011–2012: Panthrakikos
- 2013: Olympiacos Volos
- 2013: PAS Giannina
- 2014–2015: Levadiakos
- 2016–2017: Iraklis
- 2017–2018: Asteras Tripolis
- 2018–2019: Aris
- 2019–2020: Atromitos
- 2021: Atromitos
- 2021–2022: AEL Limassol
- 2022–2023: Lamia
- 2024–2025: Asteras Tripolis
- 2025–2026: AEL
- * Club domestic league appearances and goals

Savvas Pantelidis (Greek: Σάββας Παντελίδης; born 7 April 1965) is a Greek professional football manager and former player.

== Playing career ==
Pantelidis played for club Doxa Vyronas from 1988 until 1997 before playing for Proodeftiki from 1997 until 2002.

== Managerial career ==
Pantelidis began his career as a coach for Thrasyvoulos from 2005 until 2007. He then coached Rodos, Fostiras, Kallithea, Egaleo, Trikala, Ethnikos Piraeus.
