= Dimitrios Farantos =

Greek football manager

Personal information
- Full name: Dimitrios Farantos
- Date of birth: 16 May 1966 (age 60)
- Place of birth: Livadeia, Greece

Managerial career
- Years: Team
- 2003–2003: Levadiakos
- 2003–2004: Levadiakos
- 2007–2018: Levadiakos (technical director)
- 2010: → Levadiakos
- 2013: → Levadiakos (caretaker)
- 2016: → Levadiakos (caretaker)
- 2017: → Levadiakos (caretaker)
- 2019–: Lamia (chief scout)

Dimitrios Farantos (Greek: Δημήτριος Φαράντος; born 16 May 1966) is a Greek football manager.
