= Thanasis Moulopoulos =

Greek footballer

Personal information
- Full name: Athanasios Moulopoulos
- Date of birth: 9 June 1985 (age 41)
- Place of birth: Veria, Greece
- Height: 1.73 m (5 ft 8 in)
- Position: Right back

Youth career
- 2001: Ethnikos Asteras U20

Senior career*
Years	Team	Apps	(Gls)
2002–2007	Ethnikos Asteras	86	(0)
2007–2014	Levadiakos	132	(2)
2014–2015	AEL	18	(0)
2015–2017	Levadiakos	43	(0)
2017–2018	Aris Limassol	22	(0)
- * Club domestic league appearances and goals

Thanasis Moulopoulos (Greek: Θανάσης Μουλόπουλος; born 9 June 1985) is a Greek former footballer who played as a defender.

== Career ==
Born in Veria, Moulopoulos began playing football for Ethnikos Asteras F.C. in the Beta Ethniki.
