= Kostas Christoforakis =

Greek football manager

Personal information
- Full name: Konstantinos Christoforakis
- Date of birth: 11 April 1975 (age 51)
- Place of birth: Monemvasia, Greece

Managerial career
- Years: Team
- 2017: Kerkyra (caretaker)
- 2017: Kerkyra (caretaker)
- 2019: Kerkyra (caretaker)
- 2020–2021: Kerkyra

Kostas Christoforakis (Greek: Κώστας Χριστοφοράκης; born 11 April 1975) is a Greek football manager.
