= Konstantinos Fliskas =

Greek footballer

Kostas Fliskas
Personal information
- Full name: Konstantinos Fliskas
- Date of birth: 29 December 1980 (age 45)
- Place of birth: Karditsa, Greece
- Height: 1.79 m (5 ft 10 1/2 in)
- Position: Centre-back

Team information
- Current team: Panserraikos (General Manager)

Senior career*
| Years | Team | Apps | (Gls) |
| 2004–2005 | Anagennisi Karditsa | 27 | (4) |
| 2005–2019 | Xanthi | 258 | (2) |
| Total | | 285 | (6) |
- * Club domestic league appearances and goals as of 23:21, 7 May 2019 (UTC)

Konstantinos "Kostas" Fliskas (Greek: Κωνσταντίνος "Κώστας" Φλίσκας; born 21 April 1980) is a Greek former professional footballer who played as a centre-back.

== Career ==
Born in Karditsa, Fliskas began playing professional football with Anagennisi Karditsa F.C. in the Gamma Ethniki. In the summer of 2005, he signed with Super League side Xanthi where he played till 2019.
