= Michalis Grigoriou =

Greek footballer and manager

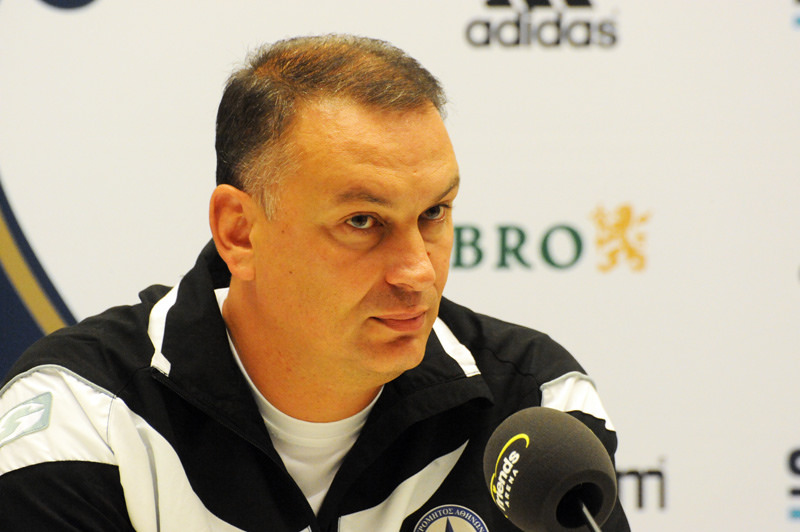

Personal information
- Full name: Michail Grigoriou
- Date of birth: 19 December 1973 (age 52)
- Place of birth: Athens, Greece
- Position: Defender

Team information
- Current team: Aris (manager)

Senior career*
Years	Team	Apps	(Gls)
1989–1996	Ethnikos Piraeus	33	(1)
1996	AEL	0	(0)
1997	Xanthi	0	(0)
1997–1998	Naoussa	0	(0)
1998–2000	Chaidari	0	(0)
2000–2004	Agios Dimitrios	16	(0)

Managerial career
- 2004–2005: Agios Dimitrios
- 2006: Athinaikos
- 2007: Fostiras
- 2007–2008: Aiolikos
- 2008–2009: Korinthos
- 2009–2010: Ethnikos Piraeus
- 2010–2011: Doxa Drama
- 2012–2013: Panserraikos
- 2013–2015: Kerkyra
- 2015: Atromitos
- 2016–2017: Kerkyra
- 2017–2018: Panionios
- 2019–2020: AEL
- 2020–2022: Lamia
- 2023: Ionikos
- 2023–2024: PAS Giannina
- 2024: Panserraikos
- 2026–: Aris
- * Club domestic league appearances and goals

Michalis Grigoriou (Greek: Μιχάλης Γρηγορίου; born 19 December 1973) is a Greek professional football manager. He is the current manager of Super League club Aris.

== Playing career ==
Grigoriou played for Ethnikos Piraeus at club level, including two seasons in the Alpha Ethniki.

== Honours ==
=== Manager ===
Fostiras

- Delta Ethniki: 2006–07
