= PAE Kerkyra =

- Full name: Ποδοσφαιρική Αθλητική Ενωση "Κέρκυρα" (Football Athletic Union "Kerkyra")
- Short name: Kassiopi
- Founded: 1984—2013 (Kassiopi); 2013—2020 (AOK Kerkyra); 2020–2021 (Kassiopi).
- Dissolved: 2021
- Ground: Kerkyra Stadium
- Capacity: 3,000
Home colours

PAE Kerkyra (Greek: ΠΑΕ Κέρκυρα), was a Greek football club based in Corfu, Greece. The club played in the Gamma Ethniki, the fourth tier of the Greek football league system, following changes to the league structure in 2019. It played its home matches at Kerkyra Stadium. The club was founded in 2013 following a merger between AO Kerkyra and AO Kassiopi. In May 2021 the team changed its name again in A.O Kassiopi.

== History ==
Athlitikos Omilos Kassiopi (Athletic Club of Kassiopi), or AO Kassiopi, was the football club of the village Kassiopi in north-east Corfu. The club was founded in 1984 and in 2012, it became champion of Delta Ethniki Group 5 and was promoted to Football League 2 for the first time in history. The next season it was finished in the third place of the championship of football (League 2 2012–13) and promoted to Football League (second division).

In the same season (2012–13) Kerkyra was relegated from Super League to Football League. On account of a lot of debts, Kerkyra couldn't play in the professional league of Football League. So the owners of the historical club of Corfu agreed with the owners of Kassiopi for the merge of two clubs in order to Kerkyra continue its presence in professional leagues without debts. The intention was the new club to be named PAE Kerkyra but the court approved of the name PAE AOK Kerkyra.

Kerkyra was dismissed by Super League and automatically got relegated to Football League as they were accused and proved to commit fake transfer of shares. Kerkyra was given the last position on the league table. Next season Kerkyra got 2nd place and gained promotion into Super League along with the 1st place team AEL.

In the period 2020-2021 the team did not declare participation in the Football League in order to participate in the fourth highest football league in Greece, Gamma Ethniki while it was expected to take the name "PAE Kerkyra". In the last matches participated again as A.O. Kassiopi and was finally relegated to the local championship.

== Crest and colours ==
=== Crest ===
The emblem of the club is similar to the seal of the flag of the municipality of Corfu, an ancient Greek ship, a symbol of the island. That ancient Greek ship is the quadriceps trireme and symbolizes the power of the Phaeacians navy in antiquity.

=== Colours ===
Their colours are also the same; black and white.

== Stadium ==
Kerkyra's stadium was built in 1961. It is located in Garitsa, in the city of Corfu. The stadium is on the southern side of the city, next to the entrance to the airport. The stadium is part of Corfu's National Athletic Center (EAC). It has two stands, one large west and one smaller east, built in 1973. Chrysopatas was first placed in 1983. Since then, for 20 years, a few have changed. In 2003, headlamps were installed, while in 2005 all platforms were covered with plastic seats. The construction of the shelter over the big stand was made in 2007. The erection of an extra metallic pit on the northern horseshoe is a work that has been carcassing for many years. In 2010, a 200-seat slot was delivered as a temporary solution, but it is basically not used (no tickets are issued for it). The capacity of the new petal is projected to be 1,230 seats, though when completed.

- Built in 1961
- Capacity of 2,685 (all seated)
- Biggest attendance 5,000 (Kerkyra vs PAS Giannina in 1974)

== Technical team ==
- Manager: Kostas Christoforakis
- Assistant manager: Petros Stoilas
- General manager: Alexandros Analytis
- Physical trainer: Sotiris Vino
- Goalkeeping coach: Christos Vasalos
- Technical manager: Tasos Venetis
- Doctor: Alekos Koskinas
- Physical therapist – sports Rrehabilitator: Argyris V. Rapsomanikis
- Physical therapy assistants:
  1. Vasilis Pouloumpis
  2. Akis Ilias
  3. Aggelos Polymeris

== Former managers ==
- (Greece) Michalis Grigoriou (July 24, 2013 – June 13, 2015)
- (Greece) Sakis Tsiolis (June 26, 2015 – Aug 19, 2016)
- (Greece) Angelos Digozis (Sep 9, 2016 – Nov 24, 2016)
- (Greece) Michalis Grigoriou (Nov 24, 2016 – April 11, 2017)
