= 2011–12 Super League Greece =

76th season of top-tier football league in Greece

Super League Greece
- Season: 2011–12
- Dates: 27 August 2011 – 22 April 2012
- Champions: Olympiacos; 39th Greek title
- Relegated: Ergotelis; Panetolikos; Doxa Drama
- Champions League: Olympiacos; Panathinaikos
- Europa League: Atromitos; PAOK; Asteras Tripolis
- Matches: 238
- Goals: 527 (2.21 per match)
- Top goalscorer: Kevin Mirallas (20 goals)
- Biggest home win: Olympiacos 6–0 Doxa Drama
- Biggest away win: Kerkyra 0–4 Olympiacos; Levadiakos 0–4 Olympiacos; Kerkyra 0–4 PAOK; PAS Giannina 0–4 Olympiacos
- Highest scoring: Olympiacos 7–2 Asteras Tripolis

The 2011–12 Super League Greece was the 76th season of the highest football league of Greece and the sixth under the name Super League. The season began in late August or early September 2011 and ended in May 2012 with the last matchday of the European play-off round. Olympiacos were the defending champions, having won their 38th Greek championship in the 2010–11 season.

The league comprised 13 teams from the 2010–11 season and three promoted teams from the 2010–11 Football League.

== Teams ==
AEL, Panserraikos, Iraklis, Olympiacos Volos and Kavala were relegated at the end of the 2010–11 season. AEL and Panserraikos were relegated on virtue of their league position at the end of the season; AEL had to return to the Football League, formerly known as Beta Ethniki, after six seasons, while Panserraikos were relegated after just one season. Olympiacos Volos and Kavala were initially relegated to the Delta Ethniki due to the ongoing match-fixing scandal, but after an appeal, both teams demanded to have their cases rechecked. The Professional Sports Committee refused, however, and the original penalty stood. On 22 October 2011, almost two months after the league had started, they were replaced by Doxa Drama and Levadiakos.

Iraklis were denied a licence for the 2011–12 season over unpaid debts and put into last place of the league table. The club was thus demoted to the 2011–12 Football League, concluding a twenty-nine-year run in the highest football league of Greece. The demotion of Iraklis eventually spared Asteras Tripolis from relegation.

The three relegated teams have been replaced by 2010–11 Football League champions Panetolikos, runners-up PAS Giannina and OFI via a play-off round. Panetolikos returned to the Greek top football level after 34 seasons, while PAS Giannina made their immediate comeback to the Super League.

The promotion play-off round, originally scheduled to take place in late May 2011, was postponed to late July 2011 after qualified teams OFI and Trikala were denied a licence for the 2011–12 season. The decision against OFI has since been reverted after the club successfully took the case to a civil court, enabling the side to compete in the play-offs along Levadiakos, Doxa Drama and Diagoras. OFI were eventually promoted as play-off winners after they were granted a walkover in their second-to-last match as their opponents Doxa Drama were not able to field a full side. The Heraklion club thus returned to the Super League after two seasons.

Promoted from 2010–11 Football League	Relegated from 2010–11 Super League Greece
Panetolikos; PAS Giannina; OFI; Levadiakos; Doxa Drama	AEL; Panserraikos; Iraklis; Olympiacos Volos; Kavala

=== Stadiums and locations ===
Location of the 2011–12 Super League Greece teams

Club	Location	Venue	Capacity	2010–11
AEK Athens	Athens (Marousi)	Athens Olympic Stadium	69,638	4th
Aris	Thessaloniki (Charilaou)	Kleanthis Vikelidis Stadium	22,800	6th
Asteras Tripolis	Tripoli	Asteras Tripolis Stadium	7,616	13rd
Atromitos	Athens (Peristeri)	Peristeri Stadium	10,200	11th
Doxa Drama	Thessaloniki (Triandria)	Kaftanzoglio Stadium	27,560	5th (FL)
Ergotelis	Heraklion (Ammoudara)	Pankritio Stadium	25,780	8th
Kerkyra	Corfu	Kerkyra Stadium	2,776	12th
Levadiakos	Livadeia	Levadia Municipal Stadium	6,500	4th (FL)
OFI	Heraklion (Kaminia)	Theodoros Vardinogiannis Stadium	9,088	3rd (FL)
Olympiacos	Piraeus	Karaiskakis Stadium	32,115	1st
Panathinaikos	Athens (Marousi)	Athens Olympic Stadium	69,638	2nd
Panetolikos	Agrinio	Panetolikos Stadium	5,500	1st (FL)
Panionios	Athens (Nea Smyrni)	Nea Smyrni Stadium	11,700	10th
PAOK	Thessaloniki (Toumba)	Toumba Stadium	28,703	3rd
PAS Giannina	Ioannina	Zosimades Stadium	7,652	2nd (FL)
Skoda Xanthi	Xanthi	Skoda Xanthi Arena	7,361	9th

=== Personnel and kits ===
Team	Manager	Captain	Kit manufacturer	Shirt sponsor
AEK Athens	(Greece) Nikos Kostenoglou	(Greece) Pantelis Kafes	Puma	Κino
Aris	(Portugal) Manuel Machado	(Greece) Michalis Sifakis	Under Armour	Κino
Asteras Tripolis	(Greece) Sakis Tsiolis	(Greece) Antonis Ladakis	Lotto	Lotto
Atromitos	(Greece) Georgios Donis	(Greece) Stelios Sfakianakis	Hummel	good.gr
Doxa Drama	(Greece) Makis Katsavakis	(Greece) Angelos Vertzos	Teapo	Pame Stoixima
Ergotelis	(Greece) Nikos Karageorgiou	(Brazil) Silva Júnior	Macron	Lotto
Kerkyra	(Greece) Timos Kavakas	(Greece) Dimitrios Grammozis	Masita	good.gr
Levadiakos	(Greece) Georgios Paraschos	(Greece) Thanasis Moulopoulos	Hummel	Extra 5
OFI	(Greece) Nikos Anastopoulos	(Greece) Minas Pitsos	Nike	Races
Olympiacos	(Spain) Ernesto Valverde	(Greece) Vasilis Torosidis	Puma	Pame Stoixima
Panathinaikos	(Portugal) Jesualdo Ferreira	(Spain) Josu Sarriegi	Adidas	OPAP
Panetolikos	(Greece) Giannis Dalakouras	(Greece) Giorgos Theodoridis	Hummel	Go Lucky
Panionios	(Greece) Akis Mantzios	(Greece) Fanouris Goundoulakis	Givova	Tzoker
PAOK	(Romania) László Bölöni	(Greece) Stelios Malezas	Puma	Pame Stoixima
PAS Giannina	(Greece) Angelos Anastasiadis	(Greece) Georgios Dasios	Lotto	Tzoker
Skoda Xanthi	(Greece) Marinos Ouzounidis	(Greece) Spyros Vallas	Nike	Super 3

=== Managerial changes ===
Team	Outgoing manager	Manner of departure	Date of vacancy	Position in table	Replaced by	Date of appointment
Asteras Tripolis	(Spain) Óscar Fernández	Sacked	19 September 2011	10th	(Portugal) Horácio Gonçalves	23 September 2011
AEK Athens	(Spain) Manolo Jiménez	Mutual consent	5 October 2011	3rd	(Greece) Nikos Kostenoglou	6 October 2011
Aris	(Greece) Sakis Tsiolis	Mutual consent	31 October 2011	12th	(Poland) Michał Probierz	4 November 2011
Asteras Tripolis	(Portugal) Horácio Gonçalves	Sacked	1 November 2011	13th	(Greece) Sakis Tsiolis	9 November 2011
Kerkyra	(Montenegro) Božidar Bandović	Resigned	9 November 2011	14th	(Spain) Javi Gracia	13 November 2011
Panionios	(Greece) Takis Lemonis	Mutual consent	22 November 2011	9th	(Greece) Apostolos Mantzios	24 November 2011
PAS Giannina	(Belgium) Stéphane Demol	Sacked	23 November 2011	10th	(Greece) Angelos Anastasiadis	4 December 2011
Doxa Drama	(Greece) Apostolos Charalampidis	Resigned	8 December 2011	16th	(Greece) Makis Katsavakis	8 December 2011
Aris	(Poland) Michał Probierz	Mutual consent	5 January 2012	11th	(Portugal) Manuel Machado	16 January 2012
Panetolikos	(Greece) Babis Tennes	Mutual consent	9 February 2012	12th	(Greece) Takis Lemonis	9 February 2012
Kerkyra	(Spain) Javi Gracia	Sacked	28 March 2012	15th	(Greece) Timos Kavakas	28 March 2012
Panetolikos	(Greece) Takis Lemonis	Mutual consent	11 April 2012	15th	(Greece) Giannis Dalakouras	11 April 2012

== Regular season ==
=== League table ===
Pos	Team	Pld	W	D	L	GF	GA	GD	Pts	Qualification or relegation
1	Olympiacos (C)	30	23	4	3	70	17	+53	73	Qualification for the Champions League group stage
2	Panathinaikos (Note: Panathinaikos was docked three points following severe crowd violence during a match against Olympiacos and lost the game 0–3.)	30	22	3	5	54	23	+31	66	Qualification for the Play-offs
3	PAOK	30	14	8	8	45	27	+18	50 (Note: Head-to-head points: PAOK 4, Atromitos 1.)	Qualification for the Play-offs
4	Atromitos	30	13	11	6	32	26	+6	50	Qualification for the Play-offs
5	AEK Athens	30	13	9	8	36	30	+6	48	Qualification for the Play-offs
6	Asteras Tripolis	30	13	6	11	30	34	−4	45	Qualification for Europa League second qualifying round (Note: AEK Athens were not licensed to play in the Europa League 2012–13 and therefore were replaced by the 6th placed team in the league table, which were Asteras Tripolis (which played in the second qualifying round).)
7	Levadiakos	30	11	6	13	33	42	−9	39	
8	PAS Giannina	30	10	8	12	30	35	−5	38	
9	Aris (Note: Aris was docked three points following an object thrown into the field during a match against Asteras Tripolis and lost the game 0–3.)	30	10	10	10	29	33	−4	37 (Note: Head-to-head points: Aris 6, OFI 0.)	
10	OFI	30	10	7	13	27	32	−5	37	
11	Skoda Xanthi	30	10	6	14	31	35	−4	36	
12	Panionios	30	9	6	15	26	34	−8	33	
13	Kerkyra	30	8	8	14	31	44	−13	32	
14	Ergotelis (R)	30	7	8	15	27	44	−17	29	Relegation to the Football League
15	Panetolikos (R)	30	7	7	16	23	37	−14	28	Relegation to the Football League
16	Doxa Drama (R)	30	4	5	21	11	42	−31	17	Relegation to the Football League

Source: Super League Greece
Rules for classification: 1) Points, 2) Head-to-head points, 3) Head-to-head goal difference.
If in current league table there are tied teams after applying criteria 1 to 3, they are considered to share places and listed in Greek language alphabetic order.
If in final league table there are still tied teams after applying criteria 1 to 3, a decision match (or matches if they are more than two) are to be played but only in three cases: to determine the champion, to fill spots in the play-off or to determine the teams to be relegated. In any other case, the final standings of tied teams are determined with a public draw
(C) Champions; (R) Relegated

=== Results ===
Home \ Away	AEK	ARIS	AST	ATR	DOX	ERG	KER	LEV	OFI	OLY	PAO	PNE	PGSS	PAOK	PAS	XAN
AEK Athens		3–0	2–0	0–0	0–0	1–0	1–0	2–1	1–1	1–1	2–0	1–0	1–0	0–2	2–1	1–1
Aris	1–0		0–3 (Note: The match between Aris and Asteras Tripolis was awarded to Asteras Tripolis after being suspended at 42nd minute (score: 0–1).)	0–1	2–0	1–1	1–1	2–1	1–0	2–3	3–1	0–0	4–2	1–1	1–0	0–0
Asteras Tripolis	1–1	1–0		0–0	1–0	3–0	0–0	0–1	2–2	2–0	0–2	1–0	2–0	1–0	2–1	1–1
Atromitos	1–0	0–0	0–1		2–0	1–0	3–1	1–1	2–0	0–2	1–1	2–1	2–1	0–0	1–0	1–0
Doxa Drama	1–1	1–3	1–0	0–1		1–1	0–1	0–2	0–1	0–0	0–1	2–1	0–0	0–2	1–0	0–2
Ergotelis	1–1	1–1	2–0	2–2	2–1		1–0	0–1	0–1	2–3	0–2	0–0	1–0	2–1	2–1	1–2
Kerkyra	2–2	1–0	0–0	2–2	3–1	2–1		3–2	4–1	0–4	0–2	2–3	0–3	0–4	1–2	2–0
Levadiakos	0–2	1–1	0–1	2–2	1–0	0–1	4–3		0–2	0–4	1–0	2–0	0–0	4–3	1–1	2–0
OFI	3–1	0–1	3–0	1–1	2–0	1–0	0–0	0–1		0–2	0–1	1–0	0–1	0–2	0–2	1–0
Olympiacos	2–0	3–0	7–2	1–0	6–0	3–0	0–1	3–1	2–2		1–1	2–0	2–0	2–1	2–0	2–1
Panathinaikos	3–2	1–0	3–1	1–0	1–0	4–0	1–0	3–0	3–1	0–3 (Note: The match between Panathinaikos and Olympiacos was awarded to Olympiacos after being suspended at 0–1 and 81 minutes due to severe crowd violence.)		4–0	3–0	0–2	3–1	3–0
Panetolikos	0–2	5–1	1–0	1–1	0–2	2–0	1–1	0–2	1–0	0–1	1–1		0–1	1–1	2–2	2–0
Panionios	0–1	2–1	2–0	1–2	2–0	2–2	2–0	2–0	1–3	0–3	1–2	1–0		1–2	0–0	1–1
PAOK	3–0	0–0	2–3	3–1	2–0	2–1	0–0	3–1	0–0	0–2	1–3	3–0	1–0		1–2	1–0
PAS Giannina	2–1	0–0	3–1	1–2	1–0	1–1	2–1	2–0	0–0	0–4	0–1	1–0	0–0	2–2		0–2
Skoda Xanthi	3–4	0–2	0–1	3–0	1–0	4–2	1–0	1–1	3–1	1–0	2–3	0–1	1–0	0–0	1–2	

Source: Super League Greece
Legend: Blue = home team win; Yellow = draw; Red = away team win.

== Play-offs ==
In the play-off for Champions League, the four qualified teams play each other in a home and away round robin. However, they do not all start with 0 points. Instead, a weighting system applies to the teams' standing at the start of the play-off mini-league. The team finishing fifth in the Super League will start the play-off with 0 points. The fifth placed team's end of season tally of points is subtracted from the sum of the points that other teams have. This number is then divided by five.

Before the last round of matches, fifth-placed club AEK Athens earned 48 points during the regular season. Based on this number and the calculations above, Panathinaikos as runners-up began the play-offs with four points ((66–48)/5 = 3.6, rounded to 4) while PAOK and Atromitos started with zero points each ((50–48)/5 = 0.4, rounded to 0).

Pos	Team	Pld	W	D	L	GF	GA	GD	Pts	Qualification	PAO	AEK	ATR	PAOK
2	Panathinaikos	6	3	1	2	5	4	+1	14	Qualification for the Champions League third qualifying round		1–0	1–1	2–0
3	AEK Athens	6	3	0	3	7	5	+2	9	Ineligible for the 2012–13 European competitions. (Note: AEK Athens were not licensed to play in the Europa League 2012–2013 and therefore were replaced by the 6th placed team in the league table, Asteras Tripolis, qualified for the second qualifying round. This meant that PAOK were qualified for the third qualifying round of the Europa League and Atromitos to the Europa League play-offs.)	2–0		3–2	2–0
4	Atromitos	6	2	2	2	6	6	0	8	Qualification for the Europa League play-off round (Note: Atromitos lost the final of the 2011–12 Greek Football Cup against Champions League-qualified team Olympiacos. As a consequence, the three Europa League spots were distributed by the final standings of this group.)	0–1	1–0		1–1
5	PAOK	6	2	1	3	3	6	−3	7	Qualification for the Europa League third qualifying round	1–0	1–0	0–1	

Source: Super League Greece: Standings and Schedule
Legend: Blue = home team win; Yellow = draw; Red = away team win.
Rules for classification: Rules for classification: 1) points; 2) head-to-head points; 3) head-to-head goal difference; 4) classification of regular season.

== Season statistics ==
=== Top scorers ===
Updated to games played on 22 April 2012.

Rank	Player	Club	Goals
1	(Belgium) Kevin Mirallas	Olympiacos	20
2	(Greece) Kostas Mitroglou	Atromitos	16
3	(Argentina) Sebastián Leto	Panathinaikos	15
4	(Greece) Stefanos Athanasiadis	PAOK	12
4	(Algeria) Rafik Djebbour	Olympiacos	12
6	(Brazil) Chumbinho	OFI / Levadiakos	10
6	(Finland) Njazi Kuqi	Panionios	10
6	(Serbia) Marko Pantelić	Olympiacos	10
9	(Brazil) Leonardo	AEK Athens	9
9	(Serbia) Marko Markovski	Skoda Xanthi	9

=== Top assists ===
Updated to games played on 22 April 2012.

Rank	Player	Club	Assists
1	(Algeria) Djamel Abdoun	Olympiacos	9
2	(Argentina) Ariel Ibagaza	Olympiacos	7
3	(Ghana) Quincy Owusu-Abeyie	Panathinaikos	6
3	(Brazil) Chumbinho	OFI / Levadiakos	6
3	(Argentina) Javier Umbides	Aris	6
6	(Spain) José Carlos	AEK Athens	5
6	(Brazil) Cleyton	Panathinaikos	5
6	(Germany) Denis Epstein	Atromitos	5
6	(Romania) Costin Lazar	PAOK	5
6	(Argentina) Sebastián Leto	Panathinaikos	5
6	(Brazil) Lino	PAOK	5
6	(Belgium) Kevin Mirallas	Olympiacos	5
6	(Argentina) Mauro Poy	Skoda Xanthi	5

== Awards ==
=== MVP and Best Goal Awards ===
Matchday	MVP	Best Goal	Ref
1st	(Brazil) Leonardo (AEK Athens)	(Spain) Javito (Olympiacos)	
2nd	(Belgium) Kevin Mirallas (Olympiacos)	(Colombia) Fabián Vargas (AEK Athens)	
3rd	(Greece) Stelios Vasiliou (Levadiakos)	(Greece) Stefanos Athanasiadis (PAOK)	
4th	(Portugal) Vieirinha (PAOK)	(Greece) Giannis Gianniotas (Aris)	
5th	(Spain) Toché (Panathinaikos)	(Argentina) Leandro Becerra (PAS Giannina)	
6th	(El Salvador) Dino Seremet (Doxa Drama)	(Greece) Christos Aravidis (Doxa Drama)	
7th	(Greece) Vangelis Mantzios (OFI)	(Brazil) Chumbinho (OFI)	
8th	(Greece) Ilias Anastasakos (Atromitos)	(Greece) Ilias Ioannou (Kerkyra)	
9th	(Slovakia) Mirnes Šišić (OFI)	(Greece) Vangelis Mantzios (OFI)	
10th	(Greece) Giannis Gianniotas (Aris)	(Brazil) Juliano Spadacio (PAOK)	
11th	(Spain) Jacobo Sanz (Asteras Tripolis)	(Argentina) Emanuel Perrone (Asteras Tripolis)	
12th	(Argentina) Javier Umbides (Aris)	(Croatia) Danijel Cesarec (Aris)	
13th	(Serbia) Marko Pantelić (Olympiacos)	(Brazil) Luiz Brito (Atromitos)	
14th	(Brazil) Lino (PAOK)	(Greece) Dimitris Salpingidis (PAOK)	
15th	(Greece) Stefanos Athanasiadis (PAOK)	(Serbia) Marko Markovski (Skoda Xanthi)	
16th	(Ghana) Mohammed Abubakari (Doxa Drama)	(Greece) Dimitrios Sialmas (AEK Athens)	
17th	(Greece) Dimitris Salpingidis (PAOK)	(Brazil) Cleyton (Panathinaikos)	
18th	(Cyprus) Fotis Papoulis (OFI)	(Greece) Dimitrios Grammozis (Kerkyra)	
19th	(Mexico) Nery Castillo (Aris)	(Greece) Georgios Georgiadis (PAOK)	
20th	(Greece) Fotis Kipouros (PAS Giannina)	(Argentina) Leandro Becerra (PAS Giannina)	
21st	(Greece) Apostolos Giannou (PAOK)	(Greece) Georgios Kousas (Panetolikos)	
22nd	(Greece) Lazaros Christodoulopoulos (Panathinaikos)	(Greece) Kostas Mitroglou (Olympiacos)	
23rd	(Greece) Kostas Chalkias (PAOK)	(Greece) José Holebas (Olympiacos)	
24th	(Argentina) Emanuel Perrone (Asteras Tripolis)	(Greece) Stefanos Athanasiadis (PAOK)	
25th	(Greece) Nikolaos Lazaridis (Aris)	(Greece) Vangelis Ikonomou (Atromitos)	
26th	(Romania) Costin Lazăr (PAOK)	(Uruguay) Pablo García (PAOK)	
27th	(Greece) Fotis Georgiou (PAS Giannina)	(Greece) Athanasios Tsigas (Kerkyra)	
28th	(Greece) Anastasios Kyriakos (PAS Giannina)	(Greece) Ilias Ioannou (Kerkyra)	
29th	(Greece) Angelos Charisteas (Panetolikos)	(Greece) Konstantinos Panagiotoudis (PAOK)	
30th	(Albania) Emiljano Vila (PAS Giannina)	(Greece) Giannis Fetfatzidis (Olympiacos)	

=== Annual awards ===
Annual awards were announced on 14 January 2013.

Award	Winner	Club
Greek Player of the Season	(Greece) Kostas Mitroglou	Atromitos
Foreign Player of the Season	(Belgium) Kevin Mirallas	Olympiacos
Young Player of the Season	(Greece) Panagiotis Vlachodimos	Skoda Xanthi
Goalkeeper of the Season	(Greece) Orestis Karnezis	Panathinaikos
Golden Boot	(Belgium) Kevin Mirallas	Olympiacos
Manager of the Season	(Spain) Ernesto Valverde	Olympiacos
Manager of the Season	(Greece) Georgios Donis	Atromitos

== Attendances ==
Olympiacos drew the highest average home attendance in the 2011–12 edition of the Super League Greece.

#	Team	Average attendance
1	Olympiacos	21,750
2	Panathinaikos	14,331
3	PAOK	12,297
4	Aris	8,126
5	AEK Athens	7,396
6	Panetolikos	4,961
7	OFI	3,289
8	PAS Giannina	2,948
9	Panionios	2,302
10	Asteras Tripolis	1,919
11	Atromitos	1,721
12	Skoda Xanthi	1,636
13	Ergotelis	1,172
14	Levadiakos	1,143
15	Kerkyra	979
16	Doxa Drama	970
