= Mirnes Šišić =

Slovenian footballer (born in 1981)

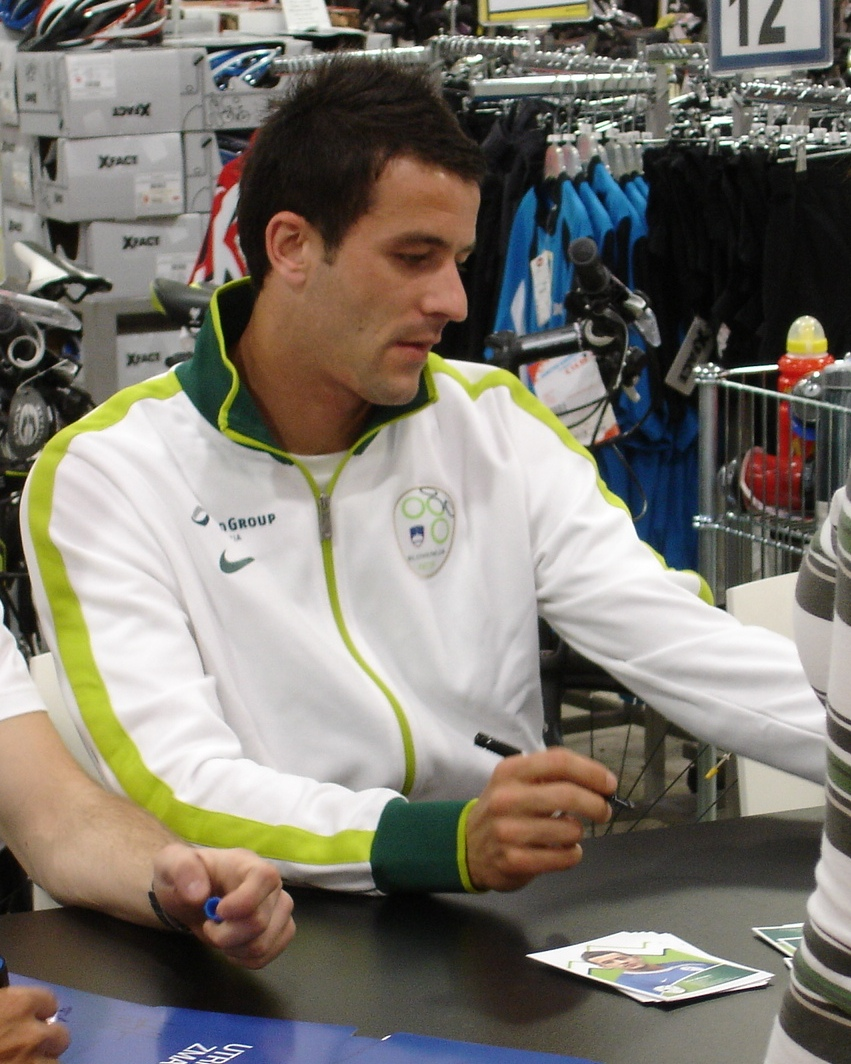

Personal information
- Full name: Mirnes Sead Šišić
- Date of birth: 8 August 1981 (age 45)
- Place of birth: Celje, SFR Yugoslavia
- Height: 1.91 m (6 ft 3 in)
- Position: Winger

Youth career
- Rudar Velenje

Senior career*
Years	Team	Apps	(Gls)
2001–2003	Rudar Velenje	19	(2)
2003–2004	Ilisiakos	14	(4)
2004–2006	AEL	25	(0)
2006–2007	Levadiakos	19	(3)
2006–2007	→ Iraklis (loan)	9	(2)
2007	Levadiakos	9	(2)
2008–2009	Olympiacos	12	(2)
2009	Red Star Belgrade	12	(0)
2010	PAS Giannina	15	(2)
2010–2011	Iraklis	15	(0)
2011–2013	OFI	35	(6)
2013	Panetolikos	20	(5)
2014	OFI	9	(0)
Total		213	(28)

International career
2008–2012	Slovenia	15	(2)
- * Club domestic league appearances and goals

Mirnes Sead Šišić (born 8 August 1981) is a Slovenian former professional footballer.

== Club career ==
=== Early career ===
Šišić began his professional footballing career in Slovenia with NK Rudar Velenje in 2001. In 2003, Šišić signed with Ilisiakos F.C. in Greece. After one season with Ilisiakos, Šišić's career continued to progress in Greece. Šišić moved on to AEL and then Levadiakos (with a short loan spell at Iraklis, and, after a strong start to the 2007–08 season with Levadiakos, Greece's most successful club, Olympiacos swooped for the Slovenian winger.

=== Olympiacos ===
Šišić made his Olympiacos debut in January 2008 in a 2–1 win against one of his former clubs, Iraklis, in Thessaloniki.

In March 2008, Šišić made his first and only appearance in the UEFA Champions League, coming on as a substitute in a 3–0 loss to Chelsea at Stamford Bridge in the first knockout stage of the competition.

Later that month, Šišić scored his first Olympiacos goal, in a 2–0 win against Atromitos which led to a 2–0 win.

In total, Šišić made 12 league appearances and scored two goals for Olympiakos in 2007–08, as the club won the Super League championship.

=== Red Star Belgrade ===
In 2007–08, Šišić played under Greek manager Takis Lemonis, and, after Lemonis was sacked in March 2008, Spanish manager José Segura. In the summer, Segura was replaced by another his countryman Ernesto Valverde. Šišić found playing time difficult to come by under Valverde, and by the winter he had not made a league appearance. During the winter transfer period, Šišić and Olympiacos decided to part ways, and the Slovenian signed with Serbian giants Red Star Belgrade

Šišić made his league debut with Red Star in February 2009 in a derby against Partizan Belgrade. In total, Šišić made 12 appearances for Red Star during the second half of the 2008–09 season.

=== PAS Giannina ===
In January 2010, Šišić returned to Greece, signing for Super League club PAS Giannina. Šišić made 15 appearances and scored 2 goals for Giannina during the second half of the 2009–10 season.

== International career ==
Soon after being signed by Olympiacos, Šišić was called up to the Slovenia national team. He scored his first goal in only his second cap—the only goal in a 1–0 victory against Hungary. He scored his second from the penalty spot in a friendly loss to Croatia.

In 2008 and 2009, made 5 appearances (all) starts in 2010 FIFA World Cup qualification matches, helping Slovenia qualify for the 2010 FIFA World Cup. He totalled 15 caps and his final international was an October 2012 World Cup qualification match away against Albania.

== Honours ==
Olympiacos

- Super League Greece: 2007–08
- Greek Cup: 2007–08

== International goals ==
#	Date	Venue	Opponent	Score	Result	Competition
1.	26 March 2008	Zalaegerszeg, Hungary	Hungary	0–1	Win	Friendly
2.	20 August 2008	Maribor, Slovenia	Croatia	2–3	Loss	Friendly
