= Gustav Granath =

Swedish footballer

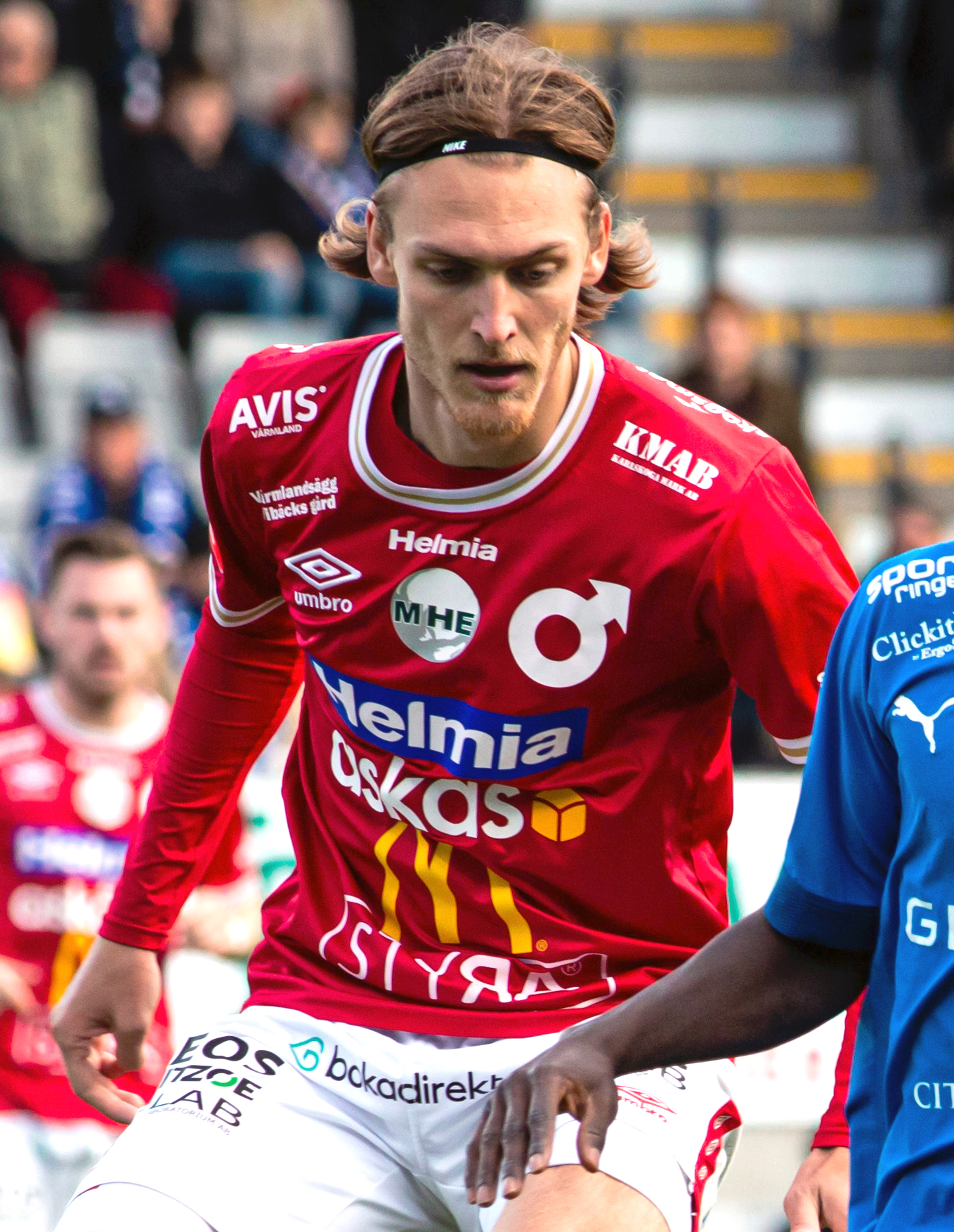

Personal information
- Date of birth: 15 February 1997 (age 29)
- Place of birth: Timmersdala, Sweden
- Height: 1.91 m (6 ft 3 in)
- Position: Centre-back

Team information
- Current team: Panetolikos
- Number: 2

Youth career
- IF Tymer
- Skövde AIK

Senior career*
Years	Team	Apps	(Gls)
2015–2018	Skövde AIK	90	(5)
2019–2023	Degerfors IF	129	(6)
2024	Vejle	0	(0)
2024	Västerås SK	16	(0)
2025–2026	HamKam	27	(1)
2026–	Panetolikos	22	(2)
- * Club domestic league appearances and goals as of 20 September 2026

Gustav Granath (born 15 February 1997) is a Swedish professional footballer who plays as a centre-back for Greek Super League club Panetolikos.

== Career ==
Granath's parent club is IF Tymer. He joined Skövde AIK as a youngster. Between 2015 and 2018, Granath played for the first team in both Division 2 and Division 1.

In January 2019, Granath was recruited by Degerfors IF, where he signed a two-year contract. Granath made his Superettan debut on 31 March 2019 in a 4-1 win over Syrianska FC. He played 29 league games and scored three goals in the 2020 season, as Degerfors IF were promoted to Allsvenskan for the upcoming season. In December 2020, Granath extended his contract at Degerfors by three years.

After the relegation to Superettan in 2023 for Degerfors IF, Gustav chose to leave the club on a free transfer.

On February 13, 2024, it was confirmed that Granath had joined Danish Superliga side Vejle Boldklub. Granath signed a deal until the end of the season, with a built-in option to extend the partnership by two years. Granath left the club when his contract expires at the end of June 2024. He never made his official debut for the club and only managed to sit on the bench in a single game for Vejle due to injuries.

On July 6, 2024, Västerås SK confirmed that Granath joined the club on a contract until the end of the year.

== Personal life ==
Granath hails from the small hamlet Timmersdala, where he started his career in tiny IF Tymer. Gustav Granath described his youth as "perfect", with football being about the only available activity in the locale. His brothers Viktor and Villiam are footballers as well. All three played simultaneously for Skövde AIK in 2015, together with their first cousin Philip Granat. The three brothers are also first cousins once removed of footballer Jonas Granath.

== Career statistics ==
=== Club ===
As of 3 April 2026

Appearances and goals by club, season and competition
Club	Season	League			National cup (Note: Includes Svenska Cupen, Norwegian Cup and Greek Cup)		Continental		Other		Total	
Club	Season	Division	Apps	Goals	Apps	Goals	Apps	Goals	Apps	Goals	Apps	Goals
Skövde AIK	2017	Ettan	26	1	—		—		—		26	1
Skövde AIK	2018	Ettan	26	3	1	0	—		—		27	3
Skövde AIK	Total		52	4	1	0	0	0	0	0	53	4
Degerfors IF	2019	Superettan	30	1	1	0	—		—		31	1
Degerfors IF	2020	Superettan	29	3	1	1	—		—		30	4
Degerfors IF	2021	Allsvenskan	18	0	5	0	—		—		23	0
Degerfors IF	2022	Allsvenskan	27	0	3	0	—		—		30	0
Degerfors IF	2023	Allsvenskan	25	2	2	0	—		—		27	2
Degerfors IF	2024	Superettan	0	0	1	0	—		—		1	0
Degerfors IF	Total		129	6	15	1	0	0	0	0	144	7
Västerås SK	2024	Allsvenskan	16	0	—		—		—		16	0
HamKam	2025	Eliteserien	27	1	4	0	—		—		31	1
HamKam	2026	Eliteserien	0	0	1	0	—		—		1	0
HamKam	Total		27	1	5	0	0	0	0	0	32	1
HamKam 2	2025	Norsk Tipping-Ligaen	3	1	—		—		—		3	1
Panetolikos	2025–26	Super League Greece	11	0	1	0	—		—		12	0
Career total			238	12	22	1	0	0	0	0	260	13
