= 2007–08 Super League Greece =

72nd season of top-tier football league in Greece

Super League Greece
- Season: 2007–08
- Dates: 1 September 2007 – 14 May 2008
- Champions: Olympiacos; 36th Greek title
- Relegated: Atromitos; Veria; Apollon Kalamarias
- Champions League: Olympiacos; Panathinaikos
- UEFA Cup: Aris (via domestic cup); AEK Athens
- Intertoto Cup: Panionios
- Matches: 252
- Goals: 601 (2.38 per match)
- Top goalscorer: Ismael Blanco (19 goals)
- Biggest home win: Skoda Xanthi 6–1 Apollon Kalamarias; AEK Athens 5–0 Panionios
- Biggest away win: Levadiakos 0–4 Panathinaikos; Panionios 0–4 Olympiacos; PAOK 0–4 AEK Athens
- Highest scoring: Olympiacos 6–2 OFI; Levadiakos 5–3 Veria

The 2007–08 Super League Greece was the 72nd season of the highest football league of Greece and the second under the name Super League. The season began on 1 September 2007 and ended on 20 April 2008. The defending champions were Olympiacos. Asteras Tripolis, Veria and Levadiakos were promoted from Beta Ethniki in the previous season.

== Postponement ==
On 25 August, the Super League and the Hellenic Football Federation decided to postpone the opening fixtures scheduled for that weekend (25 and 26 August) due to the ongoing fire disaster in the south of Greece (especially in the Peloponnese and Euboea). The championship started on 1 September 2007. Matchday 2 was carried out on the weekend of 21–22 September due to UEFA Euro 2008 qualifying matches (8 September) and Greek legislative election (16 September).

On 20 February 2008 UEFA president Michel Platini presented the Hellenic Football Federation with a CHF 1 million cheque to help finance the rebuilding of football facilities damaged by the fires in Greece that summer.

== Teams ==
Promoted from 2006–07 Beta Ethniki	Relegated from 2006–07 Super League Greece
Asteras Tripolis; Levadiakos; Veria	Kerkyra; Egaleo; Ionikos

=== Stadiums and personnel ===
Location of the 2007–08 Super League Greece teams

Team	Manager	Location	Stadium	Capacity
AEK Athens	(Greece) Nikos Kostenoglou	Athens (Marousi)	Athens Olympic Stadium	69,638
AEL	(Greece) Georgios Donis	Larissa	Alcazar Stadium	13,108
Apollon Kalamarias	(Greece) Makis Katsavakis	Thessaloniki (Kalamaria)	Kalamaria Stadium	6,500
Aris	(Bosnia and Herzegovina) Dušan Bajević	Thessaloniki (Charilaou)	Kleanthis Vikelidis Stadium	22,800
Asteras Tripolis	(Greece) Panagiotis Tzanavaras	Tripoli	Asteras Tripolis Stadium	4,200
Atromitos	(Brazil) Paulo Campos	Athens (Peristeri)	Peristeri Stadium	9,035
Ergotelis	(Greece) Nikos Karageorgiou	Heraklion (Ammoudara)	Pankritio Stadium	26,400
Iraklis	(Spain) Ángel Pedraza	Thessaloniki (Triandria)	Kaftanzoglio Stadium	27,560
Levadiakos	(Greece) Babis Tennes	Livadeia	Levadia Municipal Stadium	5,915
OFI	(Greece) Georgios Paraschos	Heraklion (Ammoudara)	Pankritio Stadium	26,400
Olympiacos	(Spain) José Segura	Piraeus	Karaiskakis Stadium	33,334
Panathinaikos	(Portugal) José Peseiro	Athens (Ampelokipoi)	Leoforos Alexandras Stadium	16,003
Panionios	(Germany) Ewald Lienen	Athens (Nea Smyrni)	Nea Smyrni Stadium	11,700
PAOK	(Portugal) Fernando Santos	Thessaloniki (Toumba)	Toumba Stadium	28,703
Skoda Xanthi	(Greece) Nikos Kechagias	Xanthi	Skoda Xanthi Arena	7,422
Veria	(Greece) Leonidas Yfantidis	Veria	Veria Stadium	5,373

=== Managerial changes ===
Team	Outgoing manager	Date of vacancy	Position in table	Incoming manager	Date of appointment
PAOK	(Greece) Georgios Paraschos	3 September 2007	14th	(Portugal) Fernando Santos	3 September 2007
Aris	(Spain) Juan Carlos Oliva	4 September 2007	7th	(Bosnia and Herzegovina) Dušan Bajević	7 September 2007
Veria	(Greece) Dimitris Kalaitzidis	12 October 2007	12th	(Serbia) Ratko Dostanić	15 October 2007
Skoda Xanthi	(Belgium) Emilio Ferrera	22 October 2007	6th	(Greece) Nikos Kechagias	22 October 2007
OFI	(Germany) Reiner Maurer	12 November 2007	13th	(Greece) Georgios Paraschos	16 November 2007
Veria	(Serbia) Ratko Dostanić	10 December 2007	15th	(Greece) Giannis Matzourakis	12 December 2007
Iraklis	(Serbia) Ivan Jovanović	17 December 2007	9th	(Spain) Ángel Pedraza	24 December 2007
AEK Athens	(Spain) Lorenzo Serra Ferrer	12 February 2008	3rd	(Greece) Nikos Kostenoglou	12 February 2008
Asteras Tripolis	(Brazil) Paulo Campos	24 February 2008	5th	(Greece) Panagiotis Tzanavaras	25 February 2008
Levadiakos	(Bulgaria) Georgi Vasilev	3 March 2008	13th	(Greece) Babis Tennes	5 March 2008
Olympiacos	(Greece) Takis Lemonis	11 March 2008	2nd	(Spain) José Segura	11 March 2008
Veria	(Greece) Giannis Matzourakis	11 March 2008	14th	(Greece) Panagiotis Tsalouchidis	13 March 2008
Veria	(Greece) Panagiotis Tsalouchidis	23 March 2008	15th	(Greece) Leonidas Yfantidis	23 March 2008
Atromitos	(Argentina) Ángel Guillermo Hoyos	26 March 2008	12th	(Brazil) Paulo Campos	27 March 2008

== Regular season ==
=== League table ===
Pos	Team	Pld	W	D	L	GF	GA	GD	Pts	Qualification or relegation
1	Olympiacos (Note: The match of Apollon Kalamarias against Olympiacos, originally ended 1–0 to the home side, but later was awarded to Olympiacos 0–3 by the Greek sports court giving Olympiacos the three points, on the basis that the home side fielded an ineligible player (Roman Wallner). Apollon were deducted by one point.) (C)	30	21	7	2	58	23	+35	70	Qualification for the Champions League third qualifying round
2	AEK Athens	30	22	2	6	65	17	+48	68	Qualification for the Play-offs
3	Panathinaikos	30	20	6	4	44	18	+26	66	Qualification for the Play-offs
4	Aris	30	14	8	8	32	20	+12	50	Qualification for the Play-offs
5	Panionios	30	13	6	11	39	42	−3	45 (Note: Head-to-head record: Panionios–AEL 3–1, AEL–Panionios 1–0.)	Qualification for the Play-offs
6	AEL	30	11	12	7	35	30	+5	45	
7	Asteras Tripolis	30	11	11	8	28	24	+4	44	
8	Skoda Xanthi	30	10	6	14	33	39	−6	36	
9	PAOK	30	10	5	15	29	35	−6	35 (Note: Head-to-head record: PAOK–Iraklis 3–0, Iraklis–PAOK 1–0.)	
10	Iraklis	30	8	11	11	28	33	−5	35	
11	Levadiakos	30	10	3	17	31	51	−20	33	
12	OFI	30	9	5	16	39	49	−10	32	
13	Ergotelis	30	7	9	14	28	42	−14	30	
14	Atromitos (R)	30	8	5	17	23	36	−13	29	Relegation to the Beta Ethniki
15	Veria (R)	30	5	8	17	21	44	−23	23	Relegation to the Beta Ethniki
16	Apollon Kalamarias (R)	30	5	8	17	27	57	−30	22	Relegation to the Beta Ethniki

Source: Super League Greece
Rules for classification: 1st points; 2nd head-to-head points; 3rd head-to-head goal difference; 4th decision match.
According to the official Super League playoff regulation, the position after the playoffs replaces the regular season position.
(C) Champions; (R) Relegated

=== Results ===
Home \ Away	AEK	AEL	APK	ARIS	AST	ATR	ERG	IRA	LEV	OFI	OLY	PAO	PGSS	PAOK	XAN	VER
AEK Athens		1–0	4–0	1–1	2–0	2–0	3–1	1–2	3–0	4–0	4–0	1–1	2–3	2–0	3–0	5–1
AEL	1–0		2–1	1–0	1–1	2–0	3–2	1–0	3–3	5–1	0–0	2–2	1–0	4–3	0–0	1–1
Apollon Kalamarias	0–1	1–1		0–0	2–2	0–2	2–1	1–1	2–0	1–1	0–3 (Note: The match was originally finished 1–0 for Apollon Kalamarias, but was awarded to Olympiacos because was the home team fielded an ineligible player Roman Wallner, which was played for Falkirk and Hamilton Academical in the season and was not allowed to play for more of two clubs in the same season according to rules of FIFA.)	1–3	0–2	0–2	1–0	1–0
Aris	0–1	1–1	2–2		2–0	2–0	2–0	2–2	1–0	2–0	1–1	0–1	0–0	3–1	2–0	1–0
Asteras Tripolis	2–1	0–1	1–1	0–0		1–0	1–1	0–0	1–2	1–1	1–0	1–0	1–0	2–0	0–0	2–0
Atromitos	0–1	2–0	3–0	1–2	0–2		1–2	1–1	2–1	1–0	1–3	0–1	0–2	0–0	2–3	1–0
Ergotelis	1–4	0–0	2–2	0–1	0–3	0–0		1–0	2–1	1–1	3–3	0–3	1–1	2–0	2–0	2–0
Iraklis	0–1	1–1	5–2	0–2	0–0	1–1	0–1		1–0	1–0	1–2	0–1	1–0	1–0	1–1	1–1
Levadiakos	0–4	0–1	2–0	2–0	0–0	2–1	0–0	3–0		0–3	1–3	0–4	1–0	2–0	2–1	5–3
OFI	1–4	0–0	3–2	0–1	0–3	0–1	4–1	2–0	1–2		0–1	4–1	1–2	2–0	2–0	3–0
Olympiacos	1–0	2–1	1–0	1–0	1–1	2–0	1–0	3–1	4–0	6–2		1–1	4–1	2–1	2–1	1–0
Panathinaikos	2–1	2–0	1–0	1–0	2–0	2–0	1–0	1–1	1–0	3–1	0–0		2–1	2–0	0–0	1–0
Panionios	0–3	3–1	2–1	0–3	4–1	2–1	2–1	1–1	2–0	1–3	0–4	1–0		0–0	2–2	3–2
PAOK	0–4	1–0	4–1	3–0	0–1	1–0	1–0	3–0	1–0	2–2	1–1	0–1	3–1		0–1	2–0
Skoda Xanthi	0–1	1–1	6–1	0–2	2–0	0–1	1–0	0–3	4–1	1–0	1–4	3–2	1–2	1–0		2–0
Veria	0–1	1–0	0–2	1–0	1–0	1–1	1–1	1–2	3–1	2–1	0–1	0–2	1–1	0–0	1–1	

Source: Worldfootball.net
Legend: Blue = home team win; Yellow = draw; Red = away team win.

== Play-offs ==
The play-off winner enters the UEFA Champions League's second qualifying round, a two-legged tier from which the winner advances to the 3rd round qualification of the UEFA Champions League. The winner of the Greek Football Cup automatically qualifies for the 2008–09 UEFA Cup, as well as the runners-up of the Super League play-off.

In the play-off for Champions League, the teams play each other in a home and away round robin. However, they do not all start with zero points. Instead, a weighting system applies to the teams' standing at the start of the play-off mini-league. The team finishing fifth in the Super League will start the play-off with zero points. The fifth place team's end of season tally of points is subtracted from the sum of the points that other teams have. This number is then divided by three to give the other teams the points with which they start the mini-league.

The teams started the play-offs with the following number of points:

- AEK Athens – 8
- Panathinaikos – 7
- Aris – 2
- Panionios – 0

=== Play-off table ===
Pos	Team	Pld	W	D	L	GF	GA	GD	Pts	Qualification	PAO	AEK	ARIS	PGSS
2	Panathinaikos	6	4	2	0	14	5	+9	21	Qualification for the Champions League second qualifying round		4–1	3–1	3–0
3	AEK Athens	6	2	2	2	10	11	−1	16	Qualification for the UEFA Cup second qualifying round	1–1		1–0	5–0
4	Aris (Note: Aris were guaranteed at least to play in the 2008–09 UEFA Cup second qualifying round through their Greek Cup performance.)	6	1	2	3	9	9	0	7	Qualification for the UEFA Cup second qualifying round	1–1	4–0		3–3
5	Panionios	6	1	2	3	7	15	−8	5	Qualification for the Intertoto Cup second round	1–2	2–2	1–0	

Source: Super League Greece
Legend: Blue = home team win; Yellow = draw; Red = away team win.
Rules for classification: 1) points; 2) head-to-head points; 3) head-to-head goal difference; 4) head-to-head goals scored; 5) goal difference; 6) number of goals scored.

== Top scorers ==
Rank	Player	Club	Goals
1	(Argentina) Ismael Blanco	AEK Athens	19
2	(Serbia) Darko Kovačević	Olympiacos	17
3	(Greece) Dimitris Salpingidis	Panathinaikos	15
4	(Canada) Tomasz Radzinski	Skoda Xanthi	14
4	(Algeria) Rafik Djebbour	Panionios	14
6	(Greece) Nikos Liberopoulos	AEK Athens	11
7	(Greece) Lampros Choutos	Panionios	10
7	(Serbia) Predrag Đorđević	Olympiacos	10
9	(Argentina) Lucio Filomeno	Asteras Tripolis	9

Source: Galanis Sports Data

== Awards ==
=== MVP and Best Goal Awards ===
Matchday	MVP	Best Goal	Ref
1st			
2nd			
3rd			
4th			
5th			
6th			
7th			
8th			
9th			
10th	(Greece) Sokratis Papastathopoulos (AEK Athens)	(Greece) Merkourios Karaliopoulos (Apollon Kalamarias )	
11th	(Greece) Georgios Georgiadis (PAOK)	(Greece) Ieroklis Stoltidis (Olympiacos)	
12th	(Algeria) Rafik Djebbour (Panionios)	(Serbia) Darko Kovačević (Olympiacos)	
13th			
14th			
15th			
16th			
17th			
18th			
19th			
20th	(Greece) Lazaros Christodoulopoulos (PAOK)	(Brazil) Luciano Fonseca (Iraklis)	
21st			
22nd	(Poland) Maciej Bykowski (Veria)	(Poland) Rafał Grzelak (Skoda Xanthi)	
23rd	(Spain) Koke (Aris)	(Portugal) Hélder Postiga (Panathinaikos)	
24th			
25th			
26th			
27th			
28th			
29th			
30th	(Argentina) Ismael Blanco (AEK Athens)	(Greece) Lampros Choutos (Panionios)	

=== Annual awards ===
Annual awards were announced on 2 December 2008.

Award	Winner	Club
Greek Player of the Season	(Greece) Dimitris Salpingidis	Panathinaikos
Foreign Player of the Season	(Serbia) Darko Kovačević (Argentina) Ismael Blanco	Olympiacos; AEK Athens
Young Player of the Season	(Greece) Sokratis Papastathopoulos	AEK Athens
Goalkeeper of the Season	(Greece) Antonis Nikopolidis	Olympiacos
Golden Boot	(Argentina) Ismael Blanco	AEK Athens
Manager of the Season	(Bosnia and Herzegovina) Dušan Bajević	Aris

== Attendances ==
Olympiacos drew the highest average home attendance in the 2007–08 edition of the Super League Greece.

#	Team	Average attendance
1	Olympiacos	24,196
2	AEK Athens	21,551
3	PAOK	11,394
4	Panathinaikos	9,213
5	Aris	7,712
6	AEL	4,612
7	Iraklis	3,768
8	Ergotelis	3,382
9	OFI	3,134
10	Asteras Tripolis	3,045
11	Atromitos	2,437
12	Panionios	2,372
13	Skoda Xanthi	2,255
14	Apollon Kalamarias	1,863
15	Veria	1,752
16	Levadiakos	1,736
