= Stajić =

Stajić is a South Slavic surname. Notable people with the surname include:

- Boban Stajić (born 1993), Macedonian basketball player
- Duško Stajić (born 1982), Bosnian footballer
- Milorad Stajić (born 2002), Bosnian footballer
- Nikola Stajić (born 2001), Serbian footballer
- Vasa Stajić (1878–1947), Serbian writer and philosopher
