= Dimitris Theodoropoulos =

Greek footballer

Personal information
- Full name: Dimitrios Theodoropoulos
- Date of birth: 9 May 1998 (age 28)
- Place of birth: Greece
- Height: 1.84 m (6 ft 0 in)
- Position: Goalkeeper

Team information
- Current team: Tilikratis

Youth career
- 2016–2018: Panetolikos

Senior career*
Years	Team	Apps	(Gls)
2018–2020	Panetolikos	0	(0)
2020–2021	Zakynthos		
2022–	Tilikratis	0	(0)
- * Club domestic league appearances and goals as of 31 January 2020

Dimitris Theodoropoulos (Greek: Δημήτρης Θεοδωρόπουλος; born 9 May 1998) is a Greek professional footballer who plays as a goalkeeper for Tilikratis.
