= Giannis Mantzourakis =

Greek footballer & manager (born 1949)

Personal information
- Full name: Ioannis Mantzourakis
- Date of birth: 6 June 1949 (age 77)
- Place of birth: Bucharest, Romania
- Positions: Midfielder; striker

Youth career
- 1962–1967: Şcoala Sportivă 2 București

Senior career*
Years	Team	Apps	(Gls)
1967–1969	CFR Cluj	30	(15)
1969–1970	Rapid Bucharest	13	(1)
1970–1973	PAOK	40	(6)
1973–1978	AEL	111	(28)
1975–1976	→ Terrassa (loan)	0	(0)
1977	Toronto Panhellenic		
1978–1979	Iraklis	10	(0)
Total		204	(50)

International career
1969	Romania U23	1	(0)

Managerial career
- 1979–1980: Orestis Orestiada
- 1981–1982: Chalkida
- 1982–1985: Egaleo
- 1985–1986: Kavala
- 1986–1987: Egaleo
- 1987–1988: APOP Paphos
- 1988–1989: Pezoporikos
- 1989–1990: APOEL
- 1990: Naoussa
- 1990–1993: Pierikos
- 1994–1995: APOEL
- 1995: AEL
- 1997–1999: Skoda Xanthi
- 2000: Olympiacos
- 2002: Anorthosis
- 2002–2003: AEL Limassol
- 2004–2006: Skoda Xanthi
- 2007: Omonia
- 2007–2008: Veria
- 2008: Skoda Xanthi
- 2008–2009: OFI
- 2009–2010: Skoda Xanthi
- 2011–2012: Kavala
- 2013–2015: AEL Kalloni
- 2015: Ergotelis
- 2015–2017: Panetolikos
- 2018: AOK Kerkyra
- 2018: Apollon Smyrnis
- * Club domestic league appearances and goals

Giannis Mantzourakis (Greek: Γιάννης Μαντζουράκης; born 6 June 1949) is a Greek professional football manager and former player.

== Early life ==
Born in Romania to a Greek father and Romanian mother. His father an ethnic Greek and communist fighter was a refugee from the Greek Civil War, who lived in Bucharest, right after the second World war.

Mantzourakis speaks fluent Romanian and he also holds a Romanian citizenship.

== Club career ==
Mantzourakis began his youth football career with Şcoala Sportivă 2 București where he met Mircea Lucescu who was three years older than him. He made his senior debut in Cluj-Napoca the birthplace of his mother playing for CFR Cluj in the Romanian Second Division in 1967. Mantzourakis helped his side to get promoted to the Romanian First Division becoming the team's top goalscorer in the 1968–69 season. Right after their promotion, Mantzourakis left Cluj to play for Rapid Bucharest. In the same year he played for the Olympic team of Romania under head coach Dumitru Teodorescu.

In 1970, he moved to Greece and played for PAOK winning the Greek Cup in 1972 and later he was transferred to AEL, where he spent the most of his career.

Mantzourakis was signed by Spanish Segunda División side, Terrassa in the 1975–76 season, but did not get to play any match. In the summer of 1977 he played abroad in the National Soccer League with Toronto Panhellenic.

He ended his career with Iraklis at the age of 31.

== Managerial career ==
Mantzourakis began his career as a coach in the 1980s, by coaching first Egaleo and then he coached Chalkida and Kavala. Then, in 1987–88 he went to Cyprus and coached APOP Paphos and later for Pezoporikos. Returning to his country the following season he was coach of Naousa. As a coach, he won his first title with his team APOEL, which coached them in 1989–90, when he went back to Cyprus. That season APOEL became champions.

For three years, since 1990 he was coach for Pierikos but then he went back to Cyprus and to his previous team APOEL in 1993 until 1995.

Returning to Greece, he coached Larissa, in 1995–96 and then he employed for Skoda Xanthi. He coached the team for four years until 1999 and he returned to the team in 2004 for two years. It is considered that his best work was for Xanthi with their chairman Christos Panopoulos. The second time when he worked for them, Xanthi achieved their greatest success in their history. As a coach of the team, Xanthi became 5th in 2005–06, a position which gave them the right to play in UEFA Cup.

The greatest moment in his career was with Olympiacos in 1999–2000 became champions and the following season when he coached the "Legend of Piraeus" in UEFA Champions League.

=== Olympiacos ===
On 9 April 2000, the day of the Greek parliament elections, Olympiacos' chairman Sokratis Kokkalis sacked manager Alberto Bigon. Matzourakis was the manager of Skoda Xanthi by this time, but on 10 April 2000, one day after Bigon left, Matzourakis signed for 1.5-year in Olympiacos.

By this time, Olympiacos was first in the league with 68 points, 1 point over Panathinaikos. Mantzourakis promised he will lead the team to 8 wins in the 8 remaining matches, that meant Olympiacos wins the championship.

His first match in the team was against Iraklis at OAKA. Olympiacos started the game well, they had many misses, but they won only 1–0 with a goal by Luciano de Souza in the 90+2 minute. Olympiacos continued winning and remained first, although Panathinaikos lost 1–0 away to Panahaiki and Matzourakis' team, with 8 wins in 8 games, celebrated its fourth consecutive championship.

In the summer transfer period, Zlatko Zahovic was transferred to Valencia, although other high-class players, such as Ze Elias, Grigoris Georgatos (on loan from Inter), Par Zetterberg, Christian Karembeu, Gabriel Alvez and the young Nery Castillo, moved to Olympiacos. With these additions, Matzourakis' team became more powerful and celebrated wins over Olympique Lyonnais (2–1) and Valencia FC (1–0) at home in the 2000–01 Champions League. Although, Olympiacos was unable to win away, and due to a loss to Heerenveen S.C. 1–0 in the Netherlands, the Greek champions finished 3rd with 9 points and failed to qualify to the second round. Due to this, Olympiacos fans were booing Matzourakis in the match against Liverpool F.C. (2–2) for the UEFA Cup.

In the final match of the group stage against Olympique Lyonnais at Gerland, Matzourakis made a substitution changing Giovanni, and the Brazilian attacked his coach verbally, with Matzourakis responding. This incident forced the fans to boo Olympiacos' coach at the match against Liverpool.

This, along with an argue with Lampros Choutos, forced Matzourakis to leave the club, while Olympiacos was first in the league, 4 points over Panathinaikos and AEK. His successor Takis Lemonis continued, winning the championship 12 points over Panathinaikos and 17 points over AEK.

=== After 2000 ===
Back in Cyprus in 2002, he coached Anorthosis Famagusta and AEL Limassol, and in 2003, AEL qualified to the Cypriot Cup final after 14 years, and was beaten on penalties by Anorthosis 5–3 after a draw 0–0.

After working in Xanthi for two years, he gave up by coaching the team on 26 September 2006, after the bad results of the team. He returned to Cyprus in January 2007, this time for AC Omonia, replacing their previous coach Ioan Andone without success. He was fired after his team was beaten in the Cypriot Cup Final by Anorthosis Famagusta.

On 14 December 2007 he was appointed manager of Veria, and his spell there was followed by good results. The team escaped the relegation zone, but on 11 March 2008 he was sacked after a home loss to his former club Olympiacos 0–1. Rumours suggested that Matzourakis will become the manager of Olympiacos for the second time after he left Veria, because Olympiacos' coach Takis Lemonis was also sacked after that match. However, Jose Segura succeeded Lemonis at Olympiacos, and Veria was relegated after Matzourakis left.

After that season, Matzourakis returned to Xanthi, but he was sacked before the start of the 2008–09 season. On 20 November 2008 he became the coach of OFI but he could not prevent the team from relegation and was sacked after the end of the season. On 22 September 2009 he once again returned to Xanthi, although the team's results were disappointing and he was sacked on 23 February 2010.

In March 2011 he signed as the manager of Kavala. His debut was not good, because his team lost 0–1 from Olympiacos Volos. In April, he was quit from the Macedonian Team and his last match with Kavala, was Kavala versus Atromitos.

On 5 March 2012 he signed as the head coach of AEL Kalloni and for the first time in his career, he would coach a team playing in the Football League. He managed to achieve promotion to the Super League, as well as securing relegation-safe status in the club's first season in the competition, despite playing all home games at neutral ground. The next season however, the club's board of directors surprisingly terminated Mantzourakis' contract in mid-season in favour of Vangelis Vlachos, who was hired a day later.

On 12 February 2015, Mantzourakis was appointed head coach of competing Super League side Ergotelis. Not two weeks later, on 25 February 2015 Mantzourakis resigned his position. In this short period, he coached the club in two crucial competition matches, recording a draw against Panionios and a loss against Atromitos.

On 8 October 2015, he was appointed head coach of Panetolikos. He led the team to 11th place in the 2015–2016 Greek Super League and his contract was renewed for the 2016–17 season. On 17 January 2017, he parted ways with Panetolikos.

== Managing career ==
As of 31 October 2016

Team	Nation	From	To	Record				
Team	Nation	From	To	Played	W	D	L	Win %
Various teams	Greece	27.8.1995	31.10.2016	380	142	87	151	37.37

== Managerial statistics ==
As of match played 19 March 2023

Managerial record by team and tenure
Team	From	To	Record				
Team	From	To	P	W	D	L	Win %
Chalkida	10 July 1981	30 June 1982	39	17	10	12	43.6
Egaleo	1 July 1982	13 June 1985	112	42	23	47	37.5
Kavala	1 July 1985	30 June 1986	43	18	10	15	41.9
Egaleo	1 July 1986	30 June 1987	42	11	4	27	26.2
APOP Paphos	1 July 1987	30 June 1988	38	13	9	16	34.2
Pezoporikos	1 July 1988	30 June 1989	34	9	17	8	26.5
APOEL	1 July 1989	30 June 1990	30	20	6	4	66.7
Naoussa	1 July 1990	28 July 1990	0	0	0	0	—
Pierikos	2 August 1990	3 January 1993	98	38	25	35	38.8
APOEL	1 July 1994	30 April 1995	35	17	8	10	48.6
AEL	1 July 1995	5 October 1995	7	2	2	3	28.6
Skoda Xanthi	4 February 1997	29 December 1999	106	44	23	39	41.5
Olympiacos	10 April 2000	25 November 2000	30	24	3	3	80.0
Anorthosis	12 January 2002	17 July 2002	18	13	2	3	72.2
AEL Limassol	23 September 2002	15 November 2003	50	26	12	12	52.0
Skoda Xanthi	1 July 2004	25 September 2006	82	35	22	25	42.7
Omonia	7 January 2007	25 May 2007	11	8	0	3	72.7
Veria	12 December 2007	11 March 2008	13	4	1	8	30.8
