= Andreas Kolovouris =

Greek footballer

Personal information
- Date of birth: 6 April 1992 (age 34)
- Place of birth: Patras, Greece
- Height: 1.88 m (6 ft 2 in)
- Position: Goalkeeper

Youth career
- Panachaiki

Senior career*
Years	Team	Apps	(Gls)
2013–2014	Kalamata	17	(0)
2014–2017	Panetolikos	0	(0)
2017–2018	Kerkyra	0	(0)
2018–2019	Panachaiki	2	(0)
2019–2020	Episkopi	1	(0)
2020	Aspropyrgos	2	(0)
2020–2021	Panachaiki	20	(0)
2021–2022	Kifisia	6	(0)
2021–2025	Panachaiki	58	(0)
2025–2026	Thyella Patras		
- * Club domestic league appearances and goals as of 29 December 2021

Andreas Kolovouris (Greek: Ανδρέας Κολοβούρης; born 6 April 1992) is a Greek professional footballer who plays as a goalkeeper.
