= Giannis Takidis =

Greek footballer

Personal information
- Full name: Ioannis Takidis
- Date of birth: 17 April 1981 (age 45)
- Place of birth: Thessaloniki, Greece
- Height: 1.86 m (6 ft 1 in)
- Position: Goalkeeper

Team information
- Current team: Rot-Weiss Frankfurt

Senior career*
Years	Team	Apps	(Gls)
2002–2005	Kickers Offenbach	3	(0)
2005–2006	Aiolikos	20	(0)
2006–2007	Panachaiki	4	(0)
2007–2008	Panegialios	31	(0)
2008–2009	Fokikos	31	(0)
2009–2011	Ilioupoli	32	(0)
2011–2012	Kallithea	27	(0)
2012–2014	Panetolikos	28	(0)
2014–	Rot-Weiss Frankfurt		
- * Club domestic league appearances and goals as of 19:17, 12 June 2013 (UTC) ‡ National team caps and goals as of 08:21, 1 July 2012 (UTC)

Giannis Takidis (Greek: Γιάννης Τακίδης; born 17 April 1981) is a Greek footballer who currently plays for Rot-Weiss Frankfurt.

== Club career ==
Takidis started his career playing with Kickers Offenbach at the Regionalliga. Since 2005, he has been playing in Greece. On 18 July 2012, he signed a 1-year contract with Panetolikos F.C.
