= Panetolikos F.C. =

Greek association football club

Panetolikos
- Full name: Pan-Aetolian Gymnastic and Educational Football Club
- Nicknames: Καναρίνια (Canaries); Τίτορμος (Titormus)
- Founded: 9 March 1926; 100 years ago
- Ground: Panetolikos Stadium
- Capacity: 7,321
- Owner: Fotis Kostoulas
- President: Gerasimos Belevonis
- Head coach: Giorgos Petrakis
- League: Super League Greece
- 2025–26: Super League Greece, 12th of 14
- Website: panetolikos.gr
Home colours	Away colours	Third colours

Panetolikos Football Club (Greek: ΠΑΕ Παναιτωλικός), or with its full name officially romanized as Panaitolikós Gymnastikós Filekpaideftikós Sýllogos (Greek: Παναιτωλικός Γυμναστικός Φιλεκπαιδευτικός Σύλλογος; Pan-Aetolian Gymnastic and Educational Club), is a Greek professional football club. It is based in Agrinio, Greece. Panetolikos was founded in 1926 and is considered one of the historical clubs in Greece, currently participating in the Greek First Division. Some of the most well known players that started their career in the club are Stratos Apostolakis, former Greek recordman in international caps (96), and Petros Michos.

Team colors are yellow and blue. The club's symbol is Titormus, the ancient Aetolian hero and their motto is "Τίτορμος Αιτωλός Ούτος Άλλος Ηρακλής" (Títormos Etolós Oútos Állos Iraklís), translated as Titormus the Aetolian is another Heracles.

== History ==
=== Formation and early years ===
Panetolikos was founded on Tuesday 9 March 1926 with the purpose, as stated in its statutes: "The development and intensification of Gymnastic and Racing, The -ETHIC- supervision and the possible after-school education of minors, through childhood and EASTERN or Sunday schools". People had the idea of creating the club they did the act: "Healthy mind in a healthy body". The unprecedented thought and goal of the founders, to provide education to the needy children through its Night Schools, added in its title the word "Educational Educator" and became an example to imitate all the Associations in Greece. Beyond sports, his social offer was enormous in very difficult times. Hundreds of poor children learned letters at Night Schools that worked and cared for themselves in society. This athletico-social organization has written glory pages for Agrinio. Sections of classic sports, volleyball, basketball, shooting, etc. were created although its football team was the one loved by Aetolians and Akarnans.

In the season 1954–55, Panetolikos participated for the first time in his history at the Pan-Hellenic Championship, as the club finished in the first position of the southern group of the regional championship as one of the six teams that took part in his final stage. In the 1960s, Panetolikos played in the Second National Championship and after relegation to the local (1972), he returned dynamically. In the spring of 1975 celebrates the rise to Alpha Ethniki. Panetolikos fought two seasons (1975–1977) and followed an unsuccessful return attempt. It followed for about twenty years where it was in the smallest category to return to the period 1975–76. In the first class, Panetolikos remained in the following year (1976–77), but then returned to the lower classes where the club remained for more than 30 years. Seven years later, Panetolikos was relegated from the 2nd and in the period 1984–85, Panetolikos conquered the championship of Gamma Ethniki.

Panetolikos winning Delta Ethniki's championship in 1989, Gamma Ethniki's championship in 1992 and 1996, and one year after Panetolikos touches the dream of returning to Alpha Ethniki, which the powerful of the season deprives him. The new millennium finds him on a downward course and is relegated to Delta Ethniki.

=== Kostoulas era ===
In the summer of 2005, the new Greek owner Fotis Kostoulas, coming from Sweden and wanting to take the reins of the city team from which he came, presented his plans for the future of the club and followed a radical refurbishment of the stadium. More specifically, the following projects were completed by the end of 2006: new turf, construction of a shelter above the western pit, renovation of the interior (changing rooms, cafe-bar, clubs, boutique shops), construction of new newspapers and suites, On the two platforms, regeneration of the surrounding area. In addition, in 2009, a new roofed frieze was built with a capacity of about 120 distinct seats above the small east stand.

==== 2008–09 Season: Promotion to Second Division ====
Panetolikos secured promotion to the Beta Ethniki for the 2009-10 season after defeating fellow third-tier side Rodos in a play-off match. The match was played at Nea Smyrni Stadium in Athens and was attended by a large crowd, including approximately 8,000 supporters from Agrinio. After conceding an early goal, Panetolikos came from behind to win 2-1 with two goals scored in the final five minutes. The victory secured the club’s promotion to the Football League. The club has continued to attract substantial support at both home and away matches.

==== 2010–11 Season: Promotion to the Super League ====
After terrific performances inside and outside Agrinio, Panetolikos won the last three critical matches (Ethnikos-Panetolikos 0–1, Panetolikos-Diagoras Rodou 3–0 and Ilioupoli-Panetolikos 2–3) and promoted to Super League. The team's 2010 performances have set new records for the Football League championship: point record (75 gathered after 34 games), away wins record (10 wins out of 23 total). Panetolikos had celebrated their promotion at home with a Friendly match against Panionios, a Super League team, on 20 May 2011.

==== 2011–12 Season: Demotion to the Football League ====
After a very bad second round of results at the Super League, Panetolikos demoted to the Football League. The chairman of the club, Mr. Kostoulas after seven years, resigned from his position. After this, the whole board resigned. Most of the players left the club, said that they wanted to return to their countries, or they want to play for other teams with better contracts.

==== 2012–13 Season: Promotion to the Super League ====
With Mr. Kostoulas again as a president, Panetolikos got promoted to the Super League via play-offs after six difficult games, especially the last one with Olympiacos Volos, which Panetolikos won 1–2. After the end of the game, the city of Agrinio celebrated the promotion until dawn.

==== 2013–14 & 2014–15 Seasons ====
The team had its most successful year so far in the First Division, finishing in the 8th place. In 2014–15 season, form of the team improved and finished First Division as 7th.

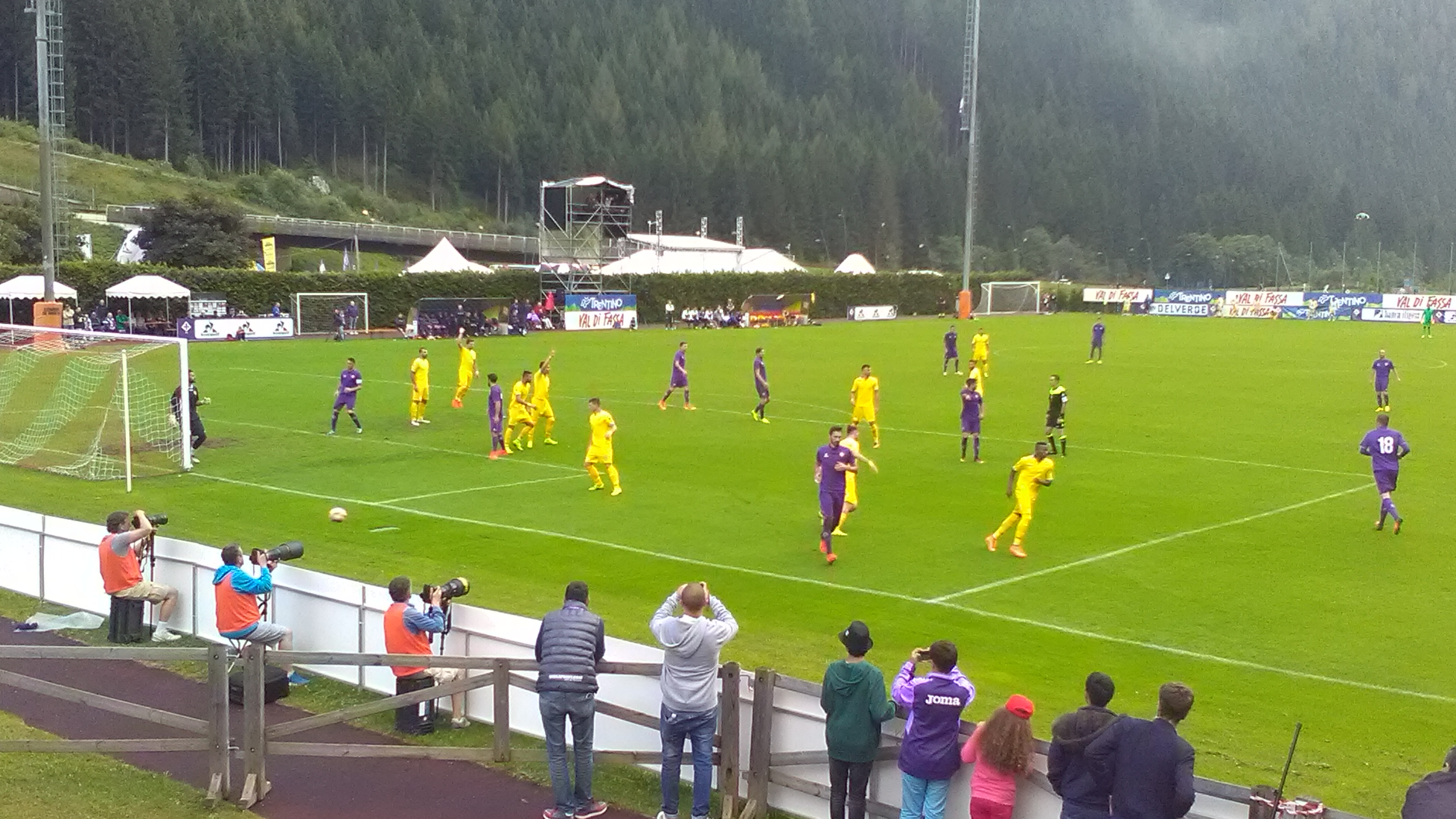
ACF Fiorentina - Panetolikos FC in a preseason game in Moena, Italy (summer 2016)

==== 2015–16 & 2016–17 Seasons ====
Panetolikos finished in the 11th place in 2016 as well as in 2017.

==== 2017–18 Season ====
The team finished at 8th place with good performances.

== Stadium ==
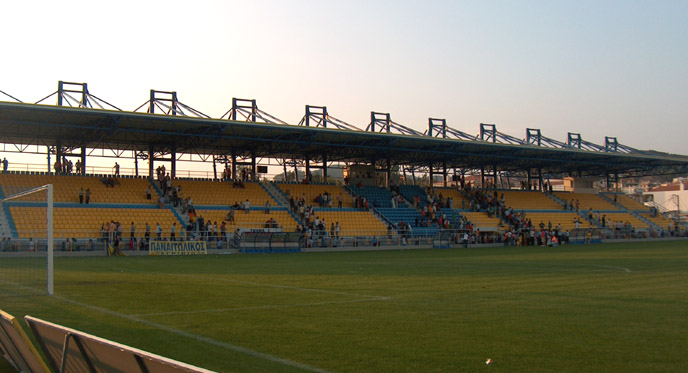
Panetolikos Stadium, inside view in 2006

Panetolikos Stadium (Greek: Γήπεδο Παναιτωλικού -Gipedo Panetolikou) is a football stadium in Agrinio, Greece. It is currently used for football matches, mainly as the home stadium of Panetolikos. It is located at Prousiotissis Street and it holds 7,500 people. Its highest attendance was 11,012 people during a match against Olympiacos in 1977. There are plans to increase the seating capacity of the stadium to 8,800 spectators. Nowadays the average attendance is 6,000.

Panetolikos Stadium has three stands. It has been used as a football ground since 1930, however, the first stand (the small one) was not constructed until the mid-1950s. The main west stand was built in the 1970s. Unfortunately, in the years that followed little else happened to the stadium, which gradually fell into disrepair. This was the situation until 2005, when the new owner of the club, Fotis Kostoulas, revealed his plans for the complete reconstruction of the stadium.

Stadium Situation: 2006–2011

The stadium features plastic seats, the club's offices, Panetolikos' boutique and coffee shops.

2006: The big stand was completely renovated, a brand new stand with a modern roof.

2010: The small stand was renovated, in the center a second level of seats with a roof was added.

2011: Works have begun after the promotion of the team to Super League in order to increase the capacity of the stadium by 1,400 seats approximately. Plus, additional lighting was added. Recently the lighting has finished, with the power of each light at 1,600 lux, which more than satisfies the Greek Super League and UEFA's 4 stars (where a team can play UEFA Champions League games) requirements.

2017: Scoreboard is added, completing the current renovation plans.

2019: Recently the Region of Western Greece has approved plans of further upgrade of the stadium, with the adding of exhibition centers, new seating stands and many other features.

== Facilities ==
Panetolikos' training center, named "Emileon", in Municipal Apartment of Dokimi, Agrinio. Emileon includes facilities used by the team as well as the wider sports communities. The center features soccer fields, swimming pools, courts for tennis and basketball, and beach volleyball areas. It is used by both the club and the residents of Agrinio

== Supporters ==
Even though Agrinio is a small city, Panetolikos supporters known as "The Warriors" & "Guerreros" are known for their loyalty to their team. Supporters can roughly be categorized to Gate 6 which represents the most radical and young part of the team's fanbase and other fan unions which attract less radical and older Panetolikos fans. First division promotion has set in motion more Panetolikos fan clubs in Aetoloakarnania and northern Greece (Thessaloniki). Up until now, the prestigious fan clubs of the team are:

Gate 6

- 1. Warriors (Fan club in Agrinio, since 1981)
- 2. Guerreros (Fan club in Athens)
- 3. Brooklyn (Fan club in Agrinio, area of St. Demetrius)

Other fan clubs

- 4. LE.FI.PA. (Club of Panetolikos Fans in Agrinio)
- 5. S.F.P (Club of Panetolikos Supporters in Agrinio)

=== Nicknames ===
Panetolikos was given the nickname The Canaries (Greek: Τα καναρίνια) in the 1960s, due to the team's colour. Panetolikos is very proud of its nickname, thus its mascot is a canary with the name PANETOS.

Panetolikos was also given the nickname Titormus, from the ancient hero.

Another nickname is Agriniotes, because the team is settled in Agrínio

== 21st century league performances ==
Season	Division	Position
2010–11	Beta Ethniki	1st
2011–12	Super League	15th
2012–13	Beta Ethniki	4th
2013–14	Super League	8th
2014–15	Super League	7th
2015-16	Super League	11th
2016–17	Super League	11th
2017–18	Super League	8th
2018–19	Super League	9th
2019–20	Super League	13th
2020–21	Super League	12th
2021–22	Super League	11th
2022–23	Super League	11th
2023–24	Super League	9th
2024–25	Super League	10th
2025–26	Super League	12th

== Honours ==
National (7)

- Football League (Second Division)
  - Championships (2): 1974–75, 2010–11
- Gamma Ethniki (Third Division)
  - Championships (3): 1984–85, 1991–92, 1995–96
- Delta Ethniki (Fourth Division)
  - Championships (2): 1988–89, 2003―04

Regional (2)

- Mainland Greece Championship
  - Championship (1): 1955
- Youth Team, South Greece championship, 2nd and 3rd National Division
  - Championship (1): 2007

== Crest and colours ==
Panetolikos crest depicts Titormus, the ancient hero of Aetolia. The club's motto (also depicted on the crest) is Τίτορμος Αιτωλός Ούτος Άλλος Ηρακλής, translated as Titormus the Aetolian is another Heracles. The colours of the team are yellow and blue or cyan.

=== Crest evolution ===
2009-2016

2016–present

=== Kit manufacturers and shirt sponsors ===
Period	Kit Manufacturer	Shirt Sponsor
1982–83	Diadora	OPAP
1983–86	New Balance	New Balance
1989–91	Asics	OPAP
1991–92	Asics	Katsikis Keramopiia
1992–93	Lotto	National Insurance Company
1993–94	Puma	National Insurance Company
1994–95	Adidas	—
1995–96	Pony	—
1996–98	Umbro	—
1998–00	Adidas	—
2000–01	Diadora	Interamerican
2001–03	Puma	OPAP
2003–04	Nike	—
2004–05	Puma	Politeia Newspaper
2005–07	Puma	NEBB
2007–08	Lotto	NBGI Private Equity
2008–11	Lotto	OPAP
2011–13	Hummel	Go Lucky
2013–14	Umbro	—
2014–15	Tempo	Joker
2015–16	Joma	Pame Stoixima
2016–18	LEGEA	Pame Stoixima
2018–19	Zeus	Emileon
2019–2025	Givova	Emileon
2025–	Erreà	Novibet

Current sponsorships:

- Great Shirt Sponsor: Novibet
- Official Sport Clothing Manufacturer: Erreà
- Golden Sponsor: Interwetten

== Players ==
=== Current squad ===
As of 3 November 2026

Note: Flags indicate national team as defined under FIFA eligibility rules; some limited exceptions apply. Players may hold more than one non-FIFA nationality.

No.	Pos.	Nation	Player
1	GK	GRE	Michalis Pardalos
2	DF	SWE	Gustav Granath
4	DF	SWE	Elias Olsson
5	DF	GRE	Athanasios Prodromitis
6	MF	ZIM	Marvelous Nakamba
7	MF	GRE	Lampros Smyrlis
8	DF	GRE	Konstantinos Thymianis
9	FW	COL	Mateo Mejía (on loan from Burgos)
10	MF	MAR	Amine Bassi
11	MF	GUI	Salifou Soumah (on loan from Malmö FF)
12	MF	MLI	Moussa Djenepo
14	FW	SRB	Kosta Aleksić
15	DF	ESP	Christian Manrique
18	MF	CYP	Giannis Satsias
19	MF	GRE	Adriano Bregou

No.	Pos.	Nation	Player
20	FW	SEN	Youssouph Badji (on loan from AGF)
21	GK	GRE	Efthymis Papazois
22	MF	ESP	Diego Esteban
23	GK	GRE	Vasilios Xenopoulos
25	MF	ALB	Endri Goxhaj
26	FW	GRE	Aristidis Albanis
28	MF	SRB	Lazar Kojić
35	DF	GRE	Charalampos Mavrias (captain)
44	MF	MNE	Novica Eraković
45	DF	GRE	David Galiatsos
49	DF	SRB	Nikola Stajić
65	DF	GRE	Apostolos Apostolopoulos
77	MF	GRE	Vangelis Nikolaou
90	MF	GHA	Kwadwo Opoku
99	GK	UKR	Yevhen Kucherenko

=== Out on loan ===
Note: Flags indicate national team as defined under FIFA eligibility rules; some limited exceptions apply. Players may hold more than one non-FIFA nationality.

No.	Pos.	Nation	Player
—	MF	BRA	Lenny Lobato (at Ceará until 31 December 2026)
—	FW	ALB	Deivid Hoxha (at Egnatia until 30 June 2027)

== Club staff ==
Executive
Majority owner	Fotis Kostoulas
Chairman	Gerasimos Belevonis
Vice-President	Thomas Spyrou
Board Member	Kostas Takos
Board Member	Georgios Sotiropoulos
First team staff
Sport director	(Greece) Dimitrios Kothroulas
Team manager	(Greece) Anastasios Theos
Head coach	(Greece) Giorgos Petrakis
Assistant head coach	(Netherlands) Mark Luijpers
Fitness coach	Vangelis Bekas
Goalkeeper coach	Panagiotis Bartzokas
Analyst	Theodoros Tsilimigras
Physiotherapist	Athanasios Zabaras
Physiotherapist	Labros Kosmas
Physiotherapist	Grigorios Katsiadas
Under-20s & academy coaching staff
Academy manager	Anastasios Theos
Under 19s head coach	Christos Zapantis
Under 17s head coach	Dimitris Theodosiou
Under 15s head coach	Akis Belevonis

== League performances ==
Season	Categ. & Pos.	W–D–L	Goals	Points	Season	Categ. & Pos.	W–D–L	Goals	Points	Season	Categ. & Pos.	W–D–L	Goals	Points	Season	Categ. & Pos.	W–D–L	Goals	Points
1962–63	Beta Ethniki 3rd	15–8–5	40–16	71	1979–80	Beta Ethniki 5th	17–5–16	56–36	39	1996–97	Beta Ethniki 4th	17–11–6	53–30	62	2013–14	Super League 8th	11–9–14	32–33	42
1963–64	Beta Ethniki 6th	15–4–9	47–30	62	1980–81	Beta Ethniki 7th	14–10–14	36–34	38	1997–98	Beta Ethniki 6th	14–11–9	55–42	53	2014–15	Super League 7th	14–10–10	41–28	52
1964–65	Beta Ethniki 2nd	18–6–9	49–23	75	1981–82	Beta Ethniki 9th	15–11–12	44–36	41	1998–99	Beta Ethniki 13th	11–8–15	43–57	41	2015–16	Super League 11th	9–8–13	30–46	35
1965–66	Beta Ethniki 3rd	14–9–7	42–25	67	1982–83	Beta Ethniki 3rd	21–6–11	53–33	48	1999–00	Beta Ethniki 8th	14–8–12	43–34	50	2016–17	Super League 11th	8–7–15	29–40	31
1966–67	Beta Ethniki 7th	15–9–10	45–32	73	1983–84	Beta Ethniki 17th	13–9–16	39–40	35	2000–01	Beta Ethniki 11th	12–6–12	39–45	42	2017–18	Super League 8th	9–8–13	31–40	35
1967–68	Beta Ethniki 5th	12–8–10	39–30	62	1984–85	Gamma Ethniki 1st	21–14–5	64–28	56	2001–02	Gamma Ethniki 15th	6–7–17	24–46	25	2018–19	Super League 9th	10–6–14	34–48	36
1968–69	Beta Ethniki 7th	14–7–13	45–40	69	1985–86	Beta Ethniki 10th	14–9–15	49–53	37	2002–03	Delta Ethniki 2nd	23–6–1	68–8	76	2019–20	Super League 12th	6–11–16	30–48	29
1969–70	Beta Ethniki 6th	15–7–12	47–33	71	1986–87	Beta Ethniki 16th	13–10–15	39–56	36	2003–04	Delta Ethniki 1st	27–2–1	81–8	83	2020–21	Super League 13th	6–10–17	20–44	28
1970–71	Beta Ethniki 3rd	17–7–10	46–30	75	1987–88	Gamma Ethniki 9th	15–9–10	46–32	37	2004–05	Gamma Ethniki 9th	14–3–15	38–32	45	2021–22	Super League 11th	10–7–16	32–48	37
1971–72	Beta Ethniki 18th	11–11–16	28–40	71	1988–89	Delta Ethniki 1st	22–4–8	72–27	48	2005–06	Gamma Ethniki 7th	12–9–11	33–27	45	2022–23	Super League 11th	7–9–17	32–53	30
1972–73	Regional 1st				1989–90	Gamma Ethniki 8th	14–10–14	45–40	38	2006–07	Gamma Ethniki 4th	15–13–6	56–33	58	2023–24	Super League 9th	9–9–15	36–49	36
1973–74	Beta Ethniki 8th	17–8–13	47–31	42	1990–91	Gamma Ethniki 5th	13–11–10	32–28	37	2007–08	Gamma Ethniki 3rd	18–8–8	58–28	62	2024–25	Super League 10th	13–9–14	29–31	48
1974–75	Beta Ethniki 1st	22–10–6	75–27	54	1991–92	Gamma Ethniki 1st	19–8–7	50–27	46	2008–09	Gamma Ethniki 2nd	21–7–6	56–14	70	2025–26	Super League 12th	9–9–18	35–51	36
1975–76	Alpha Ethniki 15th	3–13–14	17–41	19	1992–93	Beta Ethniki 17th	10–8–16	31–46	38	2009–10	Beta Ethniki 7th	13–11–10	43–36	50					
1976–77	Alpha Ethniki 17th	9–8–17	25–51	26	1993–94	Gamma Ethniki 8th	10–16–8	45–35	46	2010–11	Football League 1st	23–6–5	47–19	75					
1977–78	Beta Ethniki 15th	13–10–15	65–49	36	1994–95	Gamma Ethniki 8th	10–16–8	45–35	46	2011–12	Super League 15th	7–7–16	23–37	28					
1978–79	Beta Ethniki 5th	17–7–14	48–46	41	1995–96	Gamma Ethniki 1st	20–7–7	61–33	67	2012–13	Football League 4th	20–13–7	55–23	73					

- Point system: 1959–60 to 1972–73: 3–2–1. 1973–74 to 1991–92: 2–1–0. 1992–93 onwards: 3–1–0.

=== League Participation ===
- Super League Greece (17): 1975–1977, 2011–2012, 2013–present
- Football League (30): 1962–1972, 1973–1975, 1977–1984, 1985–1987, 1992–1993, 1996–2001, 2009–2011, 2012–2013
- Gamma Ethniki (15): 1972–1973, 1984–1985, 1987–1988, 1989–1992, 1993–1996, 2001–2002, 2004–2009
- Delta Ethniki (3): 1988–1989, 2002–2004

== Notable former players ==
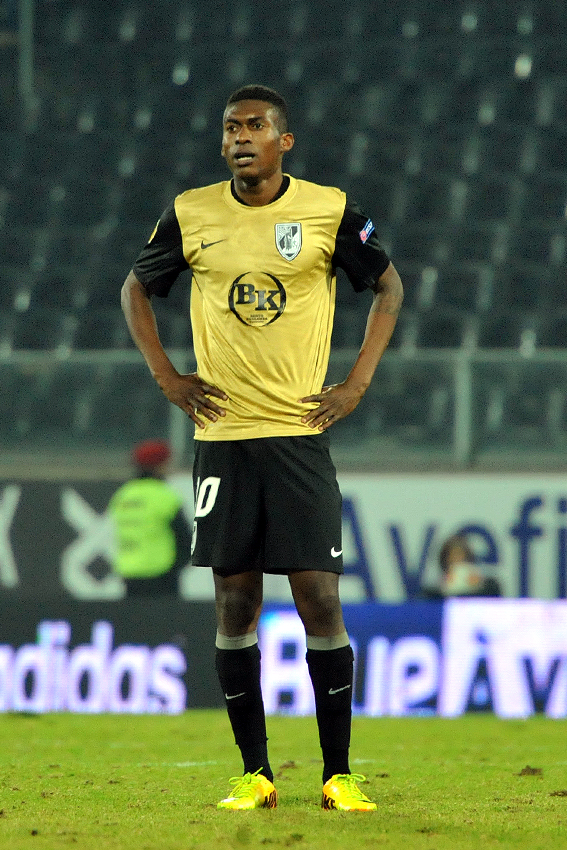
David Addy

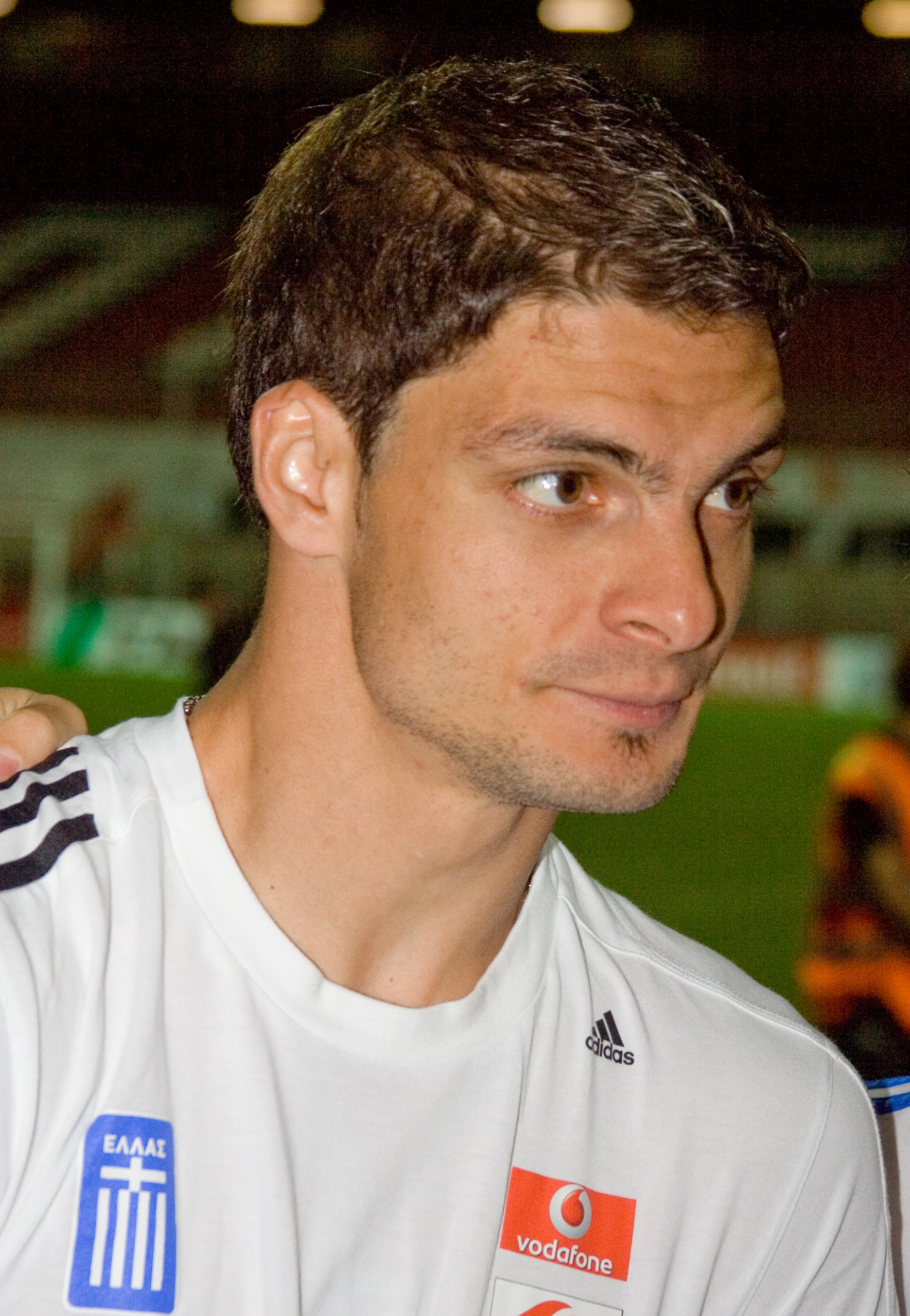
Angelos Charisteas

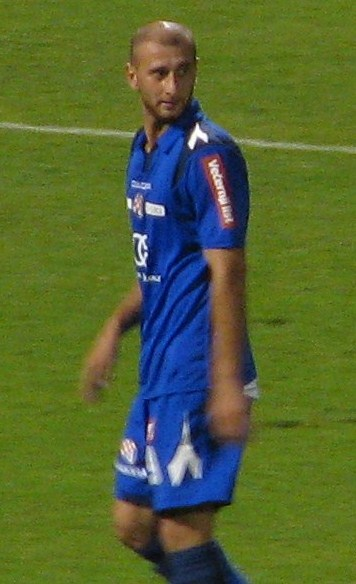
Dimitrios Papadopoulos

Albania

- (Albania) (Greece) Pavli Vangjeli
- (Albania) Mario Gurma
- (Albania) (Greece) Simon Rrumbullaku
- (Albania) (Greece) Enea Mihaj
- (Albania) Redon Bryshlli
- (Albania) Aurel Demo
- (Albania) Roni Karai
- (Albania) Kristo Koka
- (Albania) (Greece) Angelo Muka
- (Albania) (Greece) Jurgen Lleshi
- (Albania) Fialbi Lleshi
- (Albania) (Greece) Deivid Hoxha
- (Albania) (Greece) Adriano Bregou
- (Albania) (Greece) Endri Goxhaj
- (Albania) Sabion Bizi

Algeria

- (Algeria) (France) (Republic of the Congo) Raïs M'Bolhi
- (Algeria) (England) Aymen Tahar

Argentina

- (Argentina) Daniel Roberto Gil
- (Argentina) (Italy) Lucas de Francesco
- (Argentina) (Italy) Bruno Martelotto
- (Argentina) (Italy) Lucas Favalli
- (Argentina) (Italy) Mauro Poy
- (Argentina) (Portugal) Nicolás Martínez
- (Argentina) (Paraguay) Fernando Godoy
- (Argentina) (Italy) Sebastian Rusculleda
- (Argentina) (Paraguay) (Greece) Lucas Villafáñez
- (Argentina) Emiliano Romero
- (Argentina) Osmar Ferreyra
- (Argentina) (Italy) Emmanuel Ledesma
- (Argentina) Fabian Muñoz
- (Argentina) (Italy) Federico Bravo
- (Argentina) Kevin Itabel
- (Argentina) (Poland) Franco Mazurek
- (Argentina) Nicolás Maná
- (Argentina) (Italy) Adrián Lucero
- (Argentina) (Italy) Luciano Balbi
- (Argentina) Juan Álvarez
- (Argentina) Javier Mendoza
- (Argentina) Elías Pereyra
- (Argentina) (Italy) Joaquín Arzura
- (Argentina) (Italy) Nicolás Mazzola
- (Argentina) (Italy) Braian Lluy
- (Argentina) (Italy) Diego Rodríguez
- (Argentina) (Italy) Franco Baldassarra
- (Argentina) Bruno Duarte
- (Argentina) (Spain) Pedro Silva Torrejón
- (Argentina) Facundo Pérez
- (Argentina) Lucas Chaves
- (Argentina) Sebastián Lomonaco
- (Argentina) Juan Manuel García

Australia

- (Australia) (Greece) Michael Valkanis

Austria

- (Austria) Christopher Knett
- (Austria) (Greece) Alexandros Papaspyros

Belarus

- (Belarus) Vadim Narushevich
- (Belarus) Maksim Shcherbin
- (Belarus) Illya Aleksiyevich

Belgium

- (Belgium) (Netherlands) Wouter Corstjens
- (Belgium) (Democratic Republic of the Congo) Patrick Dimbala

Benin

- (Benin) (France) Rudy Gestede

Bolivia

- (Bolivia) Diego Bejarano
- (Bolivia) Danny Bejarano
- (Bolivia) Jeyson Chura

Bosnia and Herzegovina

- (Bosnia and Herzegovina) (Serbia) Simo Krunić
- (Bosnia and Herzegovina) Emir Hadžić
- (Bosnia and Herzegovina) (Serbia) Branislav Nikić
- (Bosnia and Herzegovina) Edin Cocalić
- (Bosnia and Herzegovina) Jasmin Čeliković

Brazil

- (Brazil) Fabricio Rogerio
- (Brazil) Rodriguez Ademar
- (Brazil) Giovanni Pedrini
- (Brazil) Luiz Carlos Dacroce
- (Brazil) André Rocha
- (Brazil) (Greece) Júnior
- (Brazil) (Portugal) Rafael Bracalli
- (Brazil) (Portugal) Rodrigo Galo
- (Brazil) André Alves
- (Brazil) (Italy) Marcos Paulo
- (Brazil) (Portugal) Farley Vieira Rosa
- (Brazil) (Italy) Diego Lopes
- (Brazil) (Italy) Arghus
- (Brazil) (Italy) Willyan
- (Brazil) (Italy) Vanderson
- (Brazil) (Argentina) (Italy) Lenny Lobato

Bulgaria

- (Bulgaria) Efremov
- (Bulgaria) Vlatko Kolev
- (Bulgaria) Stanislav Stoyanov
- (Bulgaria) Hristo Yanev
- (Bulgaria) (Greece) Giorgos Manthatis

Burkina Faso

- (Burkina Faso) (France) Habib Bamogo

Cameroon

- (Cameroon) (Spain) André Bikey
- (Cameroon) Olivier Boumal
- (Cameroon) (France) Valéry Mézague

Canada

- (Canada) (Greece) John Limniatis
- (Canada) (Jamaica) (Barbados) Derek Cornelius

Colombia

- (Colombia) Erik Moreno
- (Colombia) Luis Mosquera
- (Colombia) Pedro Angel Valojes
- (Colombia) Andrés Roa
- (Colombia) (Spain) Mateo Mejía

Congo

- (Republic of the Congo) (France) Delvin N'Dinga

Croatia

- (Croatia) (Serbia) Saša Jelovac
- (Croatia) Mario Budimir
- (Croatia) (Germany) Igor Jovanović
- (Croatia) (Australia) Antonio Jakoliš
- (Croatia) Branko Vrgoč

Cuba

- (Cuba) (Spain) Jorge Aguirre

Cyprus

- (Cyprus) Nikolas Konstantinou
- (Cyprus) Christos Sielis
- (Cyprus) Giannis Satsias

DR Congo

- (Democratic Republic of the Congo) (Germany) Wilson Kamavuaka

Egypt

- (Egypt) Amr Warda

England

- (England) (Greece) Michalis Banias
- (England) Jason Blunt
- (England) (Saint Kitts and Nevis) Febian Brandy
- (England) Javan Vidal

France

- (France) (Cameroon) William Edjenguélé
- (France) Cyril Kali
- (France) (Portugal) (Algeria) Florent Hanin
- (France) (Martinique) Wilfried Dalmat
- (France) (Italy) Anthony Scaramozzino
- (France) (Guadeloupe) Johan Martial
- (France) Anthony Mounier
- (France) (Portugal) Fabien Antunes
- (France) (Cameroon) Franck-Yves Bambock
- (France) (Democratic Republic of the Congo) Béni Nkololo

Gambia

- (The Gambia) (England) Cherno Samba

Georgia

- (Georgia (country)) Giorgi Kikava
- (Georgia (country)) Georgi Kipiani
- (Georgia (country)) Levan Shengelia
- (Georgia (country)) Jemal Tabidze
- (Georgia (country)) (Greece) Lazaros Arevadze

Germany

- (Germany) (Ivory Coast) Daniel Gunkel
- (Germany) (Greece) Stefanos Papoutsogiannopoulos
- (Germany) (Greece) Panagiotis Panagiotidis
- (Germany) (Greece) Christos Agrodimos
- (Germany) (Ghana) Stacy-Edis Gyan-Boatey
- (Germany) (Greece) Nikos Melissas

Ghana

- (Ghana) David Addy
- (Ghana) Kwadwo Opoku

Greece

- (Greece) Giannis Anestis
- (Greece) Kostas Apostolakis
- (Greece) Stratos Apostolakis
- (Greece) Michalis Bakakis
- (Greece) Makis Bakadimas
- (Greece) Giorgos Barkoglou
- (Greece) Christos Belevonis
- (Greece) Makis Belevonis
- (Greece) Stathis Belevonis
- (Greece) Michalis Boukouvalas
- (Greece) Giannis Bouzoukis
- (Greece) Dimitris Chantakias
- (Greece) Angelos Charisteas
- (Greece) Ilias Chatzitheodoridis
- (Greece) Diamantis Chouchoumis
- (Greece) Christos Dimopoulos
- (Greece) Filippos Darlas
- (Greece) Tasos Dentsas
- (Greece) (Albania) Elini Dimoutsos
- (Greece) Giorgos Fotakis
- (Greece) Dimitris Fytopoulos
- (Greece) Nikos Giannakopoulos
- (Greece) Vasilis Golias
- (Greece) Dimitrios Gianniotis
- (Greece) Ilias Gianniotis
- (Greece) Vaggelis Kaounos
- (Greece) (Albania) Stefanos Kapino
- (Greece) Nikos Karelis
- (Greece) Aristotelis Karasalidis
- (Greece) Alexandros Kavvadias
- (Greece) Zacharias Kavousakis
- (Greece) Dimitris Kolovos
- (Greece) Andreas Kolovouris
- (Greece) Apostolos Konstantopoulos
- (Greece) Sotiris Kontouris
- (Greece) Georgios Kousas
- (Greece) Dimitris Koutromanos
- (Greece) Dimitris Kyriakidis
- (Greece) Giorgos Liavas
- (Greece) Alexandros Malis
- (Greece) Grigoris Makos
- (Greece) Stelios Malezas
- (Greece) Nikos Marinakis
- (Greece) Charalampos Mavrias
- (Greece) Paschalis Melissas
- (Greece) Petros Michos
- (Greece) Vangelis Moras
- (Greece) (Bulgaria) Hussein Mumin
- (Greece) Giorgos Mygas
- (Greece) Marios Oikonomou
- (Greece) Epaminondas Pantelakis
- (Greece) Thanasis Paleologos
- (Greece) Anastasios Papazoglou
- (Greece) Alexandros Parras
- (Greece) Giannis Pasas
- (Greece) Giorgos Poniros
- (Greece) Georgios Simos
- (Greece) (Germany) Stelios Sfakianakis
- (Greece) Giorgos Smiltos
- (Greece) Manolis Stefanakos
- (Greece) Antonis Stergiakis
- (Greece) Giannis Takidis
- (Greece) (Ghana) (Sierra Leone) Andrews Tetteh
- (Greece) (Germany) Giorgos Theodoridis
- (Greece) Dimitris Theodoropoulos
- (Greece) Dionysis Tsamis
- (Greece) Angelos Tsingaras
- (Greece) Tasos Tsokanis
- (Greece) Manolis Tzanakakis
- (Greece) Stathis Vasiloudis
- (Greece) Stylianos Vasileiou
- (Greece) Nikos Vergos
- (Greece) Alexandros Voilis
- (Greece) Giorgos Xenitidis
- (Greece) Alexandros Zeris
- (Greece) Panagiotis Zorbas
- (Greece) Petros Zouroudis

Guinea

- (Guinea) Salifou Soumah

Guinea-Bissau

- (Guinea-Bissau) (Portugal) Mimito

Honduras

- (Honduras) Deybi Flores

Hungary

- (Hungary) (Serbia) Tibor Szabó

Iran

- (Iran) Mohammad Reza Azadi

Italy

- (Italy) (Greece) (Germany) Luigi Cennamo
- (Italy) Ivan Varone
- (Italy) (Greece) Andrea Viannelo

Ivory Coast

- (Ivory Coast) (France) Kanga Akalé
- (Ivory Coast) (France) Marc-Éric Gueï
- (Ivory Coast) Nadrey Dago

Jordan

- (Jordan) (Greece) Christos Al-Obisat

Lebanon

- (Lebanon) (Spain) (Mexico) Daniel Lajud

Liberia

- (Liberia) George Gebro
- (Liberia) (Sweden) Dulee Johnson

Mali

- (Mali) Moussa Djenepo

Mexico

- (Mexico) (Spain) Paolo Medina

Montenegro

- (Montenegro) Nemanja Vuković
- (Montenegro) Davor Jakovljević
- (Montenegro) Srđan Blažić
- (Montenegro) Novica Eraković

Morocco

- (Morocco) Jamal Achannah
- (Morocco) (France) Amine Bassi

Mozambique

- (Mozambique) (Portugal) Manuel Lopes
- (Mozambique) Clésio

Netherlands

- (Netherlands) (Suriname) Leandro Kappel

Nigeria

- (Nigeria) Benjamin Onwuachi
- (Nigeria) (Sweden) Abiola Dauda
- (Nigeria) Afeez Nosiru

Norway

- (Norway) Jarl André Storbæk

Palestine

- (Palestine) (Greece) Saado Abdel Salam Fouflia

Paraguay

- (Paraguay) José Barreto
- (Paraguay) Sergio Díaz

Peru

- (Peru) (Venezuela) Carlos Ascues

Poland

- (Poland) Fabian Pawela
- (Poland) Jacek Kacprzak
- (Poland) Konrad Michalak

Portugal

- (Portugal) Israel Pedro Gomes de Sousa
- (Portugal) Ivo Afonso
- (Portugal) Chiquinho
- (Portugal) Ricardo Fernandes
- (Portugal) (Germany) Cristiano
- (Portugal) Tomané
- (Portugal) Miguel Rodrigues
- (Portugal) Luís Rocha
- (Portugal) Pedro Amaral
- (Portugal) Guga
- (Portugal) Frederico Duarte
- (Portugal) Hélder Barbosa
- (Portugal) (Guinea-Bissau) Dálcio
- (Portugal) (Guinea-Bissau) João Pedro
- (Portugal) Miguel Luís

Romania

- (Romania) Emanuel Patrascu
- (Romania) Florin Pripu
- (Romania) Costin Lazăr
- (Romania) Vlad Morar
- (Romania) Sebastian Mladen
- (Romania) Alexandru Mățan

Senegal

- (Senegal) Samba Diarra
- (Senegal) (France) Samba Sow
- (Senegal) (Guinea) (France) Henri Camara
- (Senegal) (France) Pierre Sagna
- (Senegal) Youssouph Badji

Serbia

- (Serbia) Mihajlo Simeunović
- (Serbia) Vladimir Jovanović
- (Serbia) Zoran Stoinović
- (Serbia) Boban Stojanović
- (Serbia) Vladimir Bogdanović
- (Serbia) (Bulgaria) Pavle Popara
- (Serbia) Dušan Jovanović
- (Serbia) Željko Simović
- (Serbia) Ljubiša Milojević
- (Serbia) Milan Bojović
- (Serbia) Luka Vucicević
- (Serbia) Slobodan Miletić
- (Serbia) (Greece) Marko Markovski
- (Serbia) Nikola Stajić
- (Serbia) Andrija Majdevac
- (Serbia) Živko Živković
- (Serbia) Kosta Aleksić
- (Serbia) Lazar Kojić

Sierra Leone

- (Sierra Leone) Alhassan Kamara
- (Sierra Leone) (Sweden) Jonathan Morsay

Slovakia

- (Slovakia) (Senegal) Mouhamadou Seye
- (Slovakia) Peter Doležaj

Slovenia

- (Slovenia) Gregor Režonja
- (Slovenia) Dejan Božicić
- (Slovenia) Žiga Kljajič
- (Slovenia) Mitja Mörec
- (Slovenia) (Greece) Mirnes Šišić

Spain

- (Spain) (Germany) Kevin Ulbrich
- (Spain) Kevin
- (Spain) Álvaro Rey
- (Spain) Joan Román
- (Spain) Jesús Fernández
- (Spain) Fermín Ruiz
- (Spain) Unai García
- (Spain) (Cuba) Christian Manrique
- (Spain) Diego Esteban

Sweden

- (Sweden) Johan Wallinder
- (Sweden) Jonas Bylund
- (Sweden) Jonas Forsberg
- (Sweden) (Mali) (Finland) Demba Traoré
- (Sweden) Jonas Pelgander
- (Sweden) Sebastian Eriksson
- (Sweden) (Bosnia and Herzegovina) Admir Bajrovic
- (Sweden) Rasmus Sjöstedt
- (Sweden) Johan Mårtensson
- (Sweden) Jacob Une Larsson
- (Sweden) Gustav Granath
- (Sweden) Elias Olsson

Switzerland

- (Switzerland) (Italy) Giuseppe Aquaro
- (Switzerland) (Spain) Damian Bellón

Turkey

- (Turkey) (Greece) Deniz Baykara

Ukraine

- (Ukraine) Yevhen Kucherenko

United States

- (United States) (Canada) Ahinga Selemani
- (United States) (Nigeria) (England) Gboly Ariyibi

Uruguay

- (Uruguay) (Spain) Jorge Díaz

Uzbekistan

- (Uzbekistan) (Greece) Dimitrios Papadopoulos

Venezuela

- (Venezuela) (Spain) Juanpi
- (Venezuela) Joel Graterol

Zimbabwe

- (Zimbabwe) Marvelous Nakamba

=== Records and statistics ===
Information correct as of the match played on 22 May 2025. Bold denotes an active player for the club.
The tables refer to Panetolikos' players in Super League Greece, Greek Football Cup, Second Division Greece and Third Division Greece.

==== Top 10 Most Capped Players ====
Rank	Player	Years	App
1	(Greece) Georgios Kousas	2010–2017	210
2	(Uruguay) Jorge Díaz	2017–2023	171
3	(Greece) Georgios Liavas	2018–2025	151
4	(Portugal) Frederico Duarte	2019–2024	147
5	(Greece) Giorgos Theodoridis	2009–2012	130
6	(Greece) Angelos Tsingaras	2018–2024	129
7	(Greece) Michalis Bakakis	2008–2011, 2012–2014, 2022–2025	128
8	(Senegal) Henri Camara	2011–2014, 2015–2016	114
9	(Greece) Alexandros Malis	2016–2024	113
10	(Greece) Georgios Mygas	2012–2019	110

==== Top 10 Goalscorers ====
Rank	Player	Years	Goals
1	(Greece) Giorgos Theodoridis	2009–2012	34
2	(Senegal) Henri Camara	2011–2014, 2015–2016	29
3	(Greece) Nikos Karelis	2021–2024	27
4	(Serbia) Milan Bojović (Serbia) Marko Markovski	2012–2014, 2015–2017	18
5	(Brazil) Farley Rosa	2016–2018, 2020, 2026	17
6	(Romania) Vlad Morar	2017–2019	16
7	(Greece) Nikos Vergos	2020–2022	15
8	(Sweden) Admir Bajrović	2019–2020	13
9	(Greece) Georgios Trichias (Argentina) Lucas Villafáñez (Argentina) Franco Mazurek	2000-2001; 2014-2016; 2017-2019, 2020-2021	12
10	(Portugal) João Pedro	2022–2024	11

== Managerial history ==
- (Greece) Nikos Anastopoulos (2000–01)
- (Cyprus) Panikos Georgiou (2001)
- (Serbia) Dragan Simeunović (2004)
- (Greece) Vasilis Xanthopoulos (2004–05)
- (Greece) Stathis Stathopoulos (2005–06)
- (Greece) Lysandros Georgamlis (2006–07)
- (Greece) Vasilis Dalaperas (2007)
- (Greece) Myron Sifakis (1 July 2007 – 30 June 2008)
- (Greece) Christos Vasiliou (2008)
- (Greece) Vasilis Dalaperas (2008)
- (Greece) Spyros Marangos (2008)
- (Greece) Vasilis Xanthopoulos (2008)
- (Greece) Nikos Kehagias (1 July 2008 – 30 June 2009)
- (Greece) Vasilis Dalaperas (2009)
- (Cyprus) Siniša Gogić (1 July 2009 – 20 January 2010)
- (Greece) Giannis Dalakouras (19 January 2010 – 6 January 2011)
- (Greece) Babis Tennes (6 January 2011 – 9 February 2012)
- (Greece) Takis Lemonis (9 February 2012 – 11 April 2012)
- (Greece) Giannis Dalakouras (12 April 2012 – 30 June 2012)
- (Greece) Nikos Karageorgiou (3 July 2012 – 23 January 2013)
- (Greece) Makis Chavos (23 January 2013 – 18 May 2015)
- (Portugal) Leonel Pontes (9 June 2015 – 28 September 2015)
- (Greece) Giannis Matzourakis (8 October 2015 – 17 January 2017)
- (Greece) Makis Chavos (19 January 2017 – 7 January 2018)
- (Greece) Traianos Dellas (11 January 2018 – 19 April 2019)
- (Portugal) Luís Castro (30 May 2019 – 11 October 2019)
- (Greece) Makis Chavos (16 October 2019 – 28 October 2020)
- (Brazil) Luciano (28 October 2020 – 10 November 2020)
- (Greece) Traianos Dellas (10 November 2020 – 5 June 2021)
- (Greece) Giannis Anastasiou (10 June 2021 – 30 June 2023)
- (Argentina) Gabriel Schürrer (1 July 2023 – 3 October 2023)
- (Greece) Giannis Petrakis (4 October 2023 – 6 October 2025)
- (Greece) Giannis Anastasiou (7 October 2025 – 9 November 2026)
- (Greece) Giorgos Petrakis (14 November 2026 – present)
