= Titormus =

Legendary Greek shepherd

Titormus (Greek: Τίτορμος Títormos) was a legendary shepherd of Aetolia, famous in Antiquity for his victory over Milo of Croton, who in turn, was the most successful wrestler of the Ancient Olympics. The duel between Milo and Titormus, however, was not an ordinary wrestlers' competition: according to Claudius Aelianus, rivals compared their strength in a wild Aetolian scenery, while lifting or throwing rocks, or catching bulls. Defeated, Milo praised his victor as "the second Heracles". Titormus was believed to inhabit the most remote parts of peripheral Aetolia. From 5th century BC onwards, his legend served to strengthen Aetolia's ethnic identity.

== See also ==
- Logo of Panetolikos F.C. football team depicting Titormus, the second Heracles.
