= Giorgos Petrakis =

Greek coach and retired association football player (born 1988)

Personal information
- Full name: Georgios Petrakis
- Date of birth: 8 February 1988 (age 38)
- Place of birth: Heraklion, Crete, Greece
- Height: 1.85 m (6 ft 1 in)
- Position: Midfielder

Team information
- Current team: Panetolikos (manager)

Senior career*
Years	Team	Apps	(Gls)
–2009	Neos Asteras Rethymno	37	(2)
2009–2010	Hersonissos	4	(0)
2010–2011	Atsalenios	13	(1)
2011–2012	Irodotos	9	(0)
2012–2013	Almyros Gaziou		

Managerial career
- 2013–2015: AO Tympakiou
- 2015–2016: Irodotos
- 2016–2017: Ermis Zoniana
- 2017–2018: Chania
- 2020: Karaiskakis
- 2020: Lamia
- 2020–2021: Jeunesse Esch
- 2021: Olympiakos Nicosia
- 2022–2023: A.E. Kifisia
- 2023–2024: Doxa Katokopias
- 2024–2025: Omonia 29M
- 2025: AEL
- 2026: Iraklis
- 2026–: Panetolikos
- * Club domestic league appearances and goals

Giorgos Petrakis (Greek: Γιώργος Πετράκης; born 8 February 1988) is a Greek professional football manager and former player. He is the current manager of Super League Greece club Panetolikos.

== Personal life ==
Giorgos Petrakis is the son of Giannis Petrakis.
