= Giannis Dalakouras =

Greek football manager

Personal information
- Date of birth: 7 February 1963 (age 63)
- Place of birth: Arta, Greece

Managerial career
- Years: Team
- 1999–2000: Panetolikos
- 2001–2002: Nafpaktiakos
- 2004–2005: Anagennisi Arta
- 2005: Paniliakos
- 2010–2011: Panetolikos
- 2012: Panetolikos
- 2012–2016: Panetolikos (youth)
- 2015: Panetolikos (caretaker)
- 2017: Panetolikos (caretaker)

Giannis Dalakouras (Greek: Γιάννης Νταλακούρας; born 7 February 1963) is a Greek football manager.
