= Timmersdala =

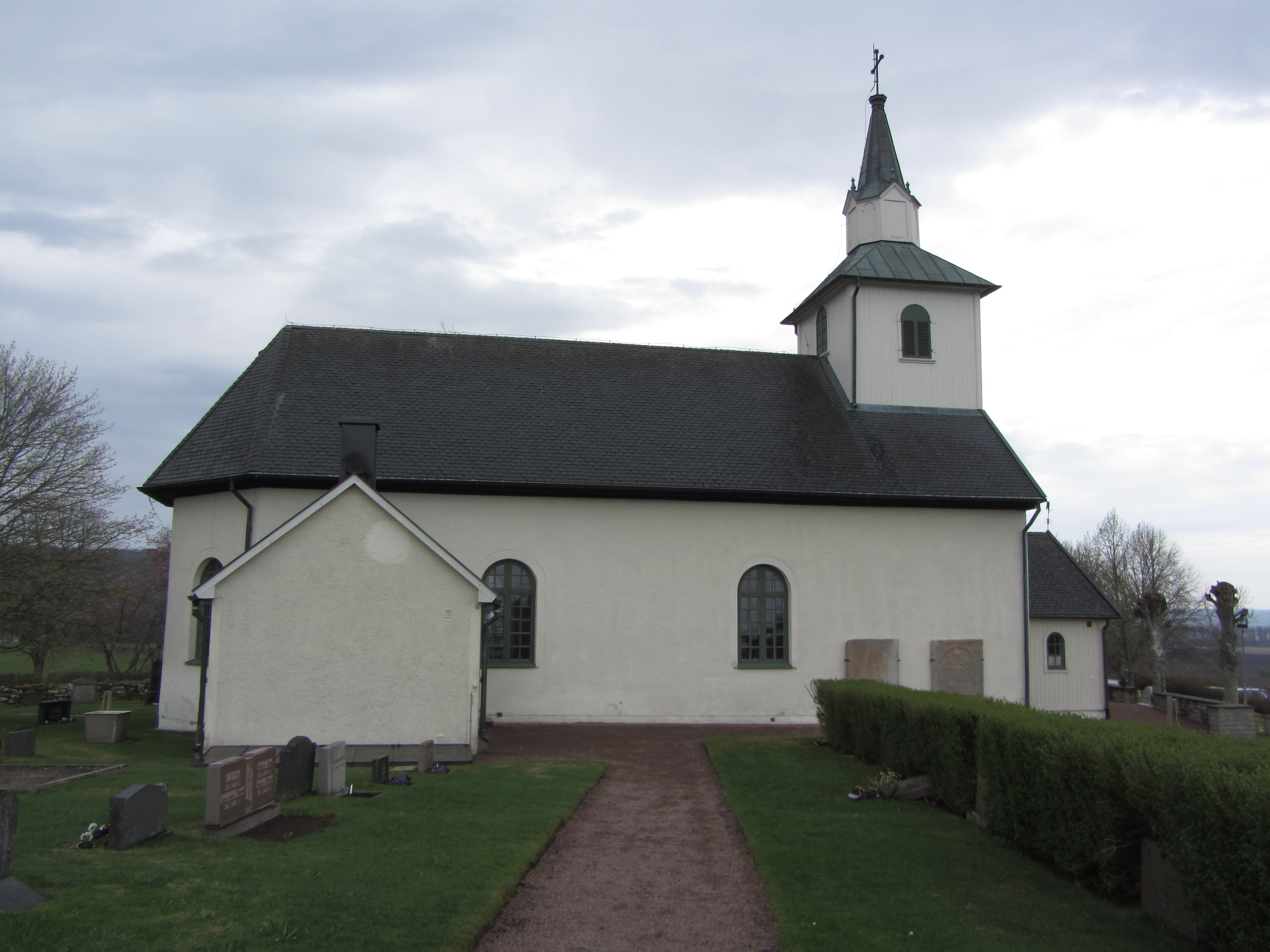
- The church in Timmersdala

- Location within Västra Götaland Location within Sweden
- Coordinates: 58°32′N 13°45′E
- Country: Sweden
- Province: Västergötland
- County: Västra Götaland County
- Municipality: Skövde Municipality

Area
  - Total: 0.67 km^{2} (0.26 sq mi)

Population (31 December 2010)
  - Total: 875
  - Density: 1,298/km^{2} (3,360/sq mi)
- Time zone: UTC+1 (CET)
  - Summer (DST): UTC+2 (CEST)

Timmersdala is a locality situated in Skövde Municipality, Västra Götaland County, Sweden with 875 inhabitants in 2010.
