= Nikola Stajić =

Serbian association footballer

Personal information
- Date of birth: 8 September 2001 (age 25)
- Place of birth: Paraćin, Serbia
- Height: 1.82 m (6 ft 0 in)
- Position: Centre-back

Team information
- Current team: Panetolikos
- Number: 49

Youth career
- Red Star Belgrade

Senior career*
Years	Team	Apps	(Gls)
2019–2021	Red Star Belgrade	0	(0)
2019–2020	→ Brodarac (loan)		
2020–2021	→ San Fernando (loan)	2	(0)
2021–2022	Grafičar Beograd	26	(1)
2022–2023	Radnički Niš	9	(0)
2023–	Panetolikos	57	(1)

International career^{‡}
2019	Serbia U19	6	(0)
- * Club domestic league appearances and goals as of 13 September 2026 ‡ National team caps and goals as of 13 October 2019

Nikola Stajić (Serbian Cyrillic: Никола Стајић; born 8 September 2001) is a Serbian professional footballer who plays as a centre-back for Greek Super League club Panetolikos.
