= Pep Segura =

Spanish football manager (born 1961)

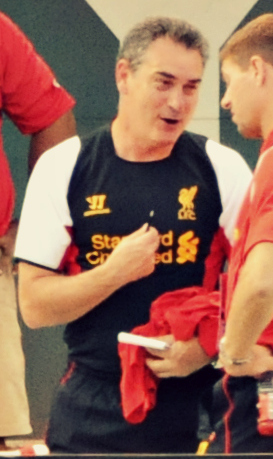
- Pep Segura in 2012

Personal information
- Full name: Josep Segura Rius
- Date of birth: 23 January 1961 (age 65)
- Place of birth: Olesa de Montserrat, Spain

Managerial career
- Years: Team
- 2006–2007: AEK Athens (assistant)
- 2007–2008: Olympiacos (assistant)
- 2008: Olympiacos

Josep "Pep" Segura Rius (born 23 January 1961) is a Spanish professional football manager.

Segura won both the Greek championship and Cup with Olympiacos after the sacking of Takis Lemonis in March 2008. He decided to leave the club after the end of the season, despite winning two titles, because the board was planning to agree with a more experienced manager. Also the 4–0 defeat from AEK Athens for the championship was a black page for him in Olympiacos. Before joining Olympiacos he was assistant manager to Lorenzo Serra Ferrer at AEK Athens. In May 2009 Segura agreed to join Liverpool as a Technical Manager at the club's Academy.

On 12 March 2011, Liverpool announced they had parted company with reserve team boss John McMahon with academy technical director Jose 'Pep' Segura taking over for the rest of the season.

On 25 September 2012, Liverpool FC confirmed that Segura had left the club.

== Honours ==
Olympiacos

- Super League Greece: 2007–08
- Greek Football Cup: 2007–08

== Timeline ==
- 2001–02: Teacher at Lleida of Physical education.
- 2002–03: Assistant of Lorenzo Serra Ferrer in Barcelona youth system.
- 2003–04: Assistant in Barcelona B
- 2004–06: Teacher again in Lleida university.
- 2006–07 Assistant manager of Ferrer at AEK Athens.
- 2007–08 Assistant manager of Takis Lemonis at Olympiacos.
- 2008 Manager at Olympiacos.
- 2009–12 Academy Technical Manager at Liverpool.
- 2015–17 Head of academy at Barcelona B, second team of Barcelona
- 2017–19 General Manager of Barcelona
