= Takis Lemonis =

Greek footballer and manager

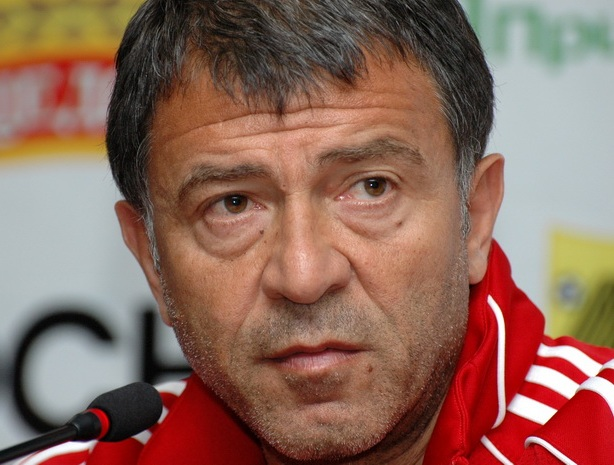

Personal information
- Full name: Panagiotis Lemonis
- Date of birth: 13 January 1960 (age 66)
- Place of birth: Colonus, Athens, Greece
- Height: 1.78 m (5 ft 10 in)
- Position: Midfielder

Youth career
- 1972–1976: Ethnikos Ellinoroson
- 1976–1978: Αttikos

Senior career*
Years	Team	Apps	(Gls)
1978–1987	Olympiacos	174	(22)
1987–1991	Levadiakos	118	(24)
1991–1993	Panionios	28	(3)
Total		320	(49)

International career
1982–1983	Greece	2	(0)

Managerial career
- 1996–2000: Asteras Zografou
- 2000–2002: Olympiacos
- 2002–2003: APOEL
- 2004–2005: Kallithea
- 2005–2006: Levadiakos
- 2006: Skoda Xanthi
- 2006–2008: Olympiacos
- 2008–2009: Panionios
- 2009–2010: Omonia
- 2010–2011: Panionios
- 2012: Panetolikos
- 2013: Levadiakos
- 2015–2016: Al Raed
- 2017: Olympiacos
- 2017–2018: Olympiacos
- 2025–2026: Radnički Niš
- * Club domestic league appearances and goals

Takis Lemonis (Greek: Τάκης Λεμονής; born 13 January 1960) is a Greek professional football manager and former player.

== Playing career ==
Takis Lemonis played for local club Attikos before playing for Olympiacos from 1978 until 1987. He also played for Levadiakos (1987 – 1991) and Ιonikos 1992, Panionios (1992 – 1993), finishing his career in Ethnikos at 1994. During his playing career, Lemonis was capped twice for Greece.

== Managerial career ==
Having stopped football as a player, Lemonis studied coaching in England and, in 1996, became head coach at Asteras Zografou. In 2000, he returned to Olympiacos as the assistant coach and, after the dismissal of Giannis Matzourakis, as head coach. Lemonis had domestic success at Olympiakos by winning two championships in a row. He left the team in October 2002. He has since coached APOEL in Cyprus (2003), Kallithea (2005) and Levadiakos upon their return to the Alpha Ethniki for the 2006 season.

Olympiacos under the leading of Takis Lemonis won the championship with 12 points difference in 2001 and beat AEK in a match practically final of the championship with a 4–3 in an impressive match in April 2002. He also won AEK 6–1 and Panathinaikos 1–4 in Leoforos, Panathinaikos' historical castle. Those victories gave him the nickname "Sir Takis".

In September 2006, Lemonis once again replaced Ioannis Matzourakis, this time as coach of Skoda Xanthi. He resigned in December 2006 and, later that month, signed a six month contract and replaced Trond Sollied as the head coach of Olympiacos.

Although Olympiacos were eventually crowned champion, the loss of the derby of the eternal enemies, the disqualification by a lower division club in the Greek Cup and the loss of Rivaldo led Olympiacos fans to boo Lemonis, Sokratis Kokkalis (the chairman of the club) and the players. However, the chairman decided to extend Lemonis's contract for two more years which keeps Lemonis in the club until summer 2009. The 2007–08 season started badly with Olympiacos losing points in the Super League and drawing with Lazio at home. The away match with Werder Bremen was critical for Lemonis. However, Olympiacos prevailed 1–3 (his first win in an away Champions League match) and Lemonis was given an extension. Lemonis was doing better on his second spell with Olympiacos, leading the way to a second away victory in Champions League away game against Lazio, a home win of 3–0 against Bremen (6–1 tally in favor of Olympiacos between the two teams), and a dominant 4–0 win against Panathinaikos in the Greek Cup eighth-finals.

As coach of Olympiacos, Lemonis has achieved a great amount in both their domestic and UEFA Champions League campaigns. He achieved Olympiacos' greatest margin of victory in the competition by defeating Bayer Leverkusen 6–2 in 2002–03. In his second reign as coach, Lemonis gave Olympiacos their first away win in the competition against SV Werder Bremen, and a trip to the Round of 16 for only the second time in their history in 2007–08.

On 12 November 2008, Lemonis signed a contract for rest of the 2008–09 season and replaced Ewald Lienen as the head coach of Panionios. He finally resigned on 3 December 2008 after the refuse of the Panionio's board to accept his request to dismiss three members of Panionio's coaching and management staff.

On 17 March 2009, he signed a two-year contract with Omonia. In 2010, Lemonis led Omonoia to its 20th Championship. He returned to Greece coaching Levadiakos, Panetolikos and Panionios.

On 23 March 2017, Lemonis returned to Olympiacos for a third managerial stint, signing a contract until the end of the season. He won his fifth championship with Olympiacos.

On 25 September 2017, Lemonis returned to Olympiacos for a fourth managerial stint, after Besnik Hasi was released from Olympiacos. Despite being credited with taking the team from fifth place to first in the Super League table before Christmas, he was relieved of his duties on 4 January 2018, while being offered the opportunity to remain at the club through an alternative staff role; alleged reasons for his dismissal were his difficulties in handling the dressing room and employing well-defined tactical plans, as well as his passive Champions League mentality with an objective of not recording heavy losses rather than being competitive against stronger opposition.

== Managerial statistics ==
As of 7 April 2026

Team	From	To	Record					
Team	From	To	M	W	D	L	Win %	Ref.
Olympiacos	25 November 2000	9 October 2002	87	61	13	13	70.11	
APOEL	1 January 2003	30 June 2003	—					
Kallithea	13 December 2003	12 May 2005	45	12	15	18	26.67	
Levadiakos	1 July 2005	30 June 2006	25	7	4	14	28.00	
Skoda Xanthi	4 October 2006	20 December 2006	9	5	2	2	55.56	
Olympiacos	29 December 2006	11 March 2008	53	36	12	5	67.92	
Panionios	12 November 2008	2 December 2008	1	0	0	1	0.00	
Omonia	17 March 2009	4 October 2010	47	29	11	7	61.70	
Panionios	10 December 2010	22 November 2011	27	6	13	8	22.22	
Panetolikos	9 February 2012	11 April 2012	9	2	1	6	22.22	
Levadiakos	18 May 2013	14 October 2013	8	2	2	4	25.00	
Al Raed	3 September 2015	1 February 2016	13	3	4	6	23.08	
Olympiacos	23 March 2017	8 June 2017	7	5	1	1	71.43	
Olympiacos	25 September 2017	4 January 2018	18	10	2	6	55.56	
Radnički Niš	10 December 2025	7 April 2026	11	5	2	4	45.45	
Total			358	183	82	93	51.12	—

== Honours ==
=== Player ===
Olympiacos

- Alpha Ethniki: 1980, 1981, 1982, 1983, 1987
- Greek Cup: 1981
- Greek Super Cup: 1980

=== Manager ===
Olympiacos

- Super League Greece: 2001, 2002, 2007, 2017
- Greek Super Cup: 2007

Omonia

- Cypriot Championship: 2010
- Cyprus FA Shield: 2010
