= 2015–16 PAOK FC season =

PAOK
2015–16 season
- President: Iakovos Angelidis (until 21 December 2015); Ľuboš Micheľ
- Manager: Igor Tudor, Vladimir Ivić
- Stadium: Toumba Stadium
- Super League Greece: 4th (1st at Playoffs)
- Greek Cup: Semi-finals
- UEFA Europa League: Group stage
- Top goalscorer: League: Stefanos Athanasiadis (11); All: Róbert Mak (19)
- Highest home attendance: 25,674 (vs Olympiacos)
- Lowest home attendance: 5,762 (vs Veria)
- Average home league attendance: 10,569
Home colours	Away colours	Third colours

The 2015–16 season was PAOK's 90th in existence and the club's 57th consecutive season in the top flight of Greek football. The team entered the Greek Cup in the Second Round and competed in UEFA Europa League starting from the second qualifying round.

On 18 June 2015, Igor Tudor became PAOK's manager after signing a three-year contract. In 2016, he was sacked after poor results. Vladimir Ivić was appointed his successor.

== Club ==
=== Coaching staff ===
Position	Staff
Head coach	(Serbia) Vladimir Ivić
Assistant manager	(Poland) Miroslaw Sznaucner
Goalkeepers' coach	(Croatia) Silvije Čavlina
Fitness trainer	(Italy) Paolo Artico

=== Board of directors ===
Position	Staff
Owner	(Russia) Ivan Savvidis
President	(Slovakia) Ľuboš Micheľ
Team manager	(Greece) Konstantinos Iosifidis
Scout	(Brazil) Lino
Scout	(Greece) Giorgos Kostikos

== Players ==
=== Squad ===
Note: Flags indicate national team as defined under FIFA eligibility rules; some limited exceptions apply. Players may hold more than one non-FIFA nationality.

No.	Pos.	Nation	Player
1	GK	GRE	Markos Vellidis
2	DF	GRE	Giannis Skondras
3	DF	GRE	Nikos Spyropoulos (Released)
4	DF	CRO	Marin Leovac
5	DF	GRE	Dimitris Chatziisaias
6	MF	GRE	Alexandros Tziolis (vice-captain)
7	MF	ISR	Eyal Golasa
8	MF	NED	Hedwiges Maduro (to Groningen (free))
9	FW	BRA	Jairo
10	FW	BUL	Dimitar Berbatov
11	MF	SVK	Róbert Mak
13	DF	GRE	Stelios Malezas
14	FW	GRE	Dimitris Salpingidis (Released)
15	DF	POR	Miguel Vítor
16	MF	BIH	Gojko Cimirot
18	FW	GRE	Efthimis Koulouris (on loan to Anorthosis)
20	DF	POR	Ricardo Costa (to Granada (free))
21	MF	GRE	Charis Charisis
22	DF	GRE	Dimitris Konstantinidis
24	MF	CPV	Garry Rodrigues

No.	Pos.	Nation	Player
25	GK	SWE	Robin Olsen (on loan to Copenhagen)
26	MF	ALB	Ergys Kaçe
27	FW	GRE	Giannis Mystakidis
30	GK	GRE	Nikos Melissas
31	DF	GRE	Georgios Tzavellas
32	FW	ARG	Facundo Pereyra (on loan to Racing Club)
33	FW	GRE	Stefanos Athanasiadis (captain)
34	MF	GRE	Nikos Korovesis
37	DF	ALB	Kristi Qose (on loan to Panserraikos)
40	MF	BEL	Maarten Martens (Retired)
44	DF	GRE	Achilleas Poungouras (on loan to Veria)
52	MF	SVK	Erik Sabo
70	DF	GRE	Stelios Kitsiou
71	GK	GRE	Panagiotis Glykos
77	MF	GRE	Dimitrios Pelkas
88	MF	GRE	Kyriakos Savvidis (on loan to Michalovce)
93	MF	AUS	Terry Antonis
96	MF	GRE	Stelios Pozoglou
99	GK	GRE	Marios Siampanis

=== Out on loan ===
Note: Flags indicate national team as defined under FIFA eligibility rules; some limited exceptions apply. Players may hold more than one non-FIFA nationality.

No.	Pos.	Nation	Player
—	DF	GRE	Nikos Vasaitis (on loan to APE Lagada)
—	DF	GRE	Vasilios Chatzidimpas (on loan to Pierikos)
—	DF	GRE	Savvas Toumanidis (on loan to Kavala)
—	MF	GRE	Stefanos Polyzos (on loan to Aiginiakos)
—	MF	GRE	Giannis Tsolakidis (on loan to Panelefsiniakos)

=== Transfers ===
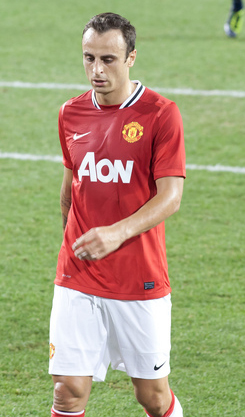
Former Manchester United forward Dimitar Berbatov signed for the club

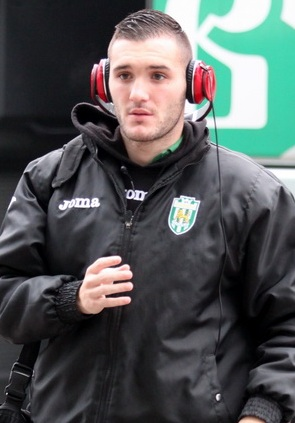
Lucas was sold to Deportivo La Coruña

In Note: Flags indicate national team as defined under FIFA eligibility rules; some limited exceptions apply. Players may hold more than one non-FIFA nationality.

No.	Pos.	Nation	Player
—	DF	CRO	Marin Leovac (from Rijeka (€1.3M))
—	MF	BIH	Gojko Cimirot (from FK Sarajevo (€1.3M))
—	MF	SVK	Erik Sabo (from Spartak Trnava (€700,000))
—	GK	SWE	Robin Olsen (from Malmö FF (€650,000))
—	MF	GRE	Charis Charisis (from PAS Giannina (€480,000))
—	FW	BRA	Jairo (from Trenčín (€400,000))
—	MF	GRE	Nikos Korovesis (from PAS Giannina (€380,000))
—	MF	AUS	Terry Antonis (from Sydney FC (€330,000))
—	DF	GRE	Stelios Malezas (from Panetolikos (€100,000))
—	FW	BUL	Dimitar Berbatov (from Monaco (free))
—	MF	CPV	Garry Rodrigues (from Elche (free))
—	GK	GRE	Markos Vellidis (from PAS Giannina (€750,000))
—	DF	GRE	Dimitris Chatziisaias (from Panionios (550k))

Out Note: Flags indicate national team as defined under FIFA eligibility rules; some limited exceptions apply. Players may hold more than one non-FIFA nationality.

No.	Pos.	Nation	Player
—	MF	ESP	Lucas (to Deportivo La Coruña (€1.5M))
—	MF	ECU	Christian Noboa (to Rostov (€1.5M))
—	GK	CMR	Charles Itandje (to Rizespor (free))
—	DF	GRE	Giorgos Katsikas (to Twente (free))
—	GK	GRE	Asterios Giakoumis (to Agrotikos Asteras (free))
—	FW	GRE	Dimitrios Papadopoulos (to Asteras Tripolis (free))
—	DF	SWE	Sotiris Papagiannopoulos (to Östersunds FK (free))
—	DF	ROU	Răzvan Raț (to Rayo Vallecano (free))
—	GK	ESP	Jacobo (Released)

== Kit ==
2015

Supplier: Macron
Sponsor(s): No

Home	Away

Source: gazzetta.gr

2015–16

Supplier: Macron
Sponsor(s): Sportingbet

Home	Away	Third	Fourth

Source: sport-fm.gr

== Friendlies ==
All times at EET

4 July 2015 Friendly	Koot Azur	1–3	PAOK	Doorwerth, Netherlands
19:00	14' furtado	Report	33' Salpingidis; 66' Savvidis; 87' Martens	Stadium: WA Scholtenlaan 138, 6865 NA Doorweth

8 July 2015 Friendly	Bochum	4–3	PAOK	Arnhem, Netherlands
17:30	Costa 9' (o.g.); Hoogland 33'; Vítor 43' (o.g.); Gregoritsch 67'	Report	Pereyra 6', 10'; Kitsiou 46'	Stadium: Sportpark Schuytgraaf

10 July 2015 Friendly	FC Dnipro	1–4	PAOK	Arnhem, Netherlands
17:00	23' Kalinić	Report	32' Lucas; 51' Charisis; 68' Mystakidis; 88' Ricardo Costa

14 August 2015 Friendly	Veria F.C.	2–1	PAOK	Veria, Greece
17:00	23' Nazlidis; 23' Merebashvili	Report	73' Jairo

== Competitions ==
=== Overview ===
Competition	Record							
Competition	Pld	W	D	L	GF	GA	GD	Win %
Super League Greece	30	13	9	8	45	32	+13	43.33
Greek Cup	9	3	3	3	14	12	+2	33.33
UEFA Europa League	12	4	6	2	18	7	+11	33.33
UEFA play-offs	6	3	3	0	8	3	+5	50.00
Total	57	23	21	13	85	54	+31	40.35

Last updated: 5 February 2017.
Source: Competitions

=== Managerial statistics ===
Head coach	From	To	Record							
Head coach	From	To	G	W	D	L	GF	GA	GD	Win %
(Croatia) Igor Tudor^{1}	Start Season	09.03.2016	44	17	17	10	68	42	+26	38.64

Head coach	From	To	Record							
Head coach	From	To	G	W	D	L	GF	GA	GD	Win %
(Serbia) Vladimir Ivic	09.03.2016	Present	11	6	4	1	17	6	+11	54.55

^{1}The match against olympiacos in the semifinal cup are not included

=== Super League Greece ===
==== League table ====
Pos	Team	Pld	W	D	L	GF	GA	GD	Pts	Qualification or relegation
2	Panathinaikos (Note: Panathinaikos were deducted 3 points due to extreme fan behavior against Olympiacos. The match was awarded as a 3–0 win for Olympiacos.)	30	18	4	8	52	26	+26	55	Qualification for the Play-offs
3	AEK Athens (Note: AEK were deducted 3 points due to extreme fan behavior against Atromitos.)	30	17	6	7	43	21	+22	54	Qualification for the Play-offs
4	PAOK (Note: PAOK were deducted 3 points due to extreme fan behavior against Olympiacos in Greek Cup semifinal match.)	30	13	9	8	45	32	+13	45	Qualification for the Play-offs
5	Panionios	30	12	8	10	33	27	+6	44	Qualification for the Play-offs
6	PAS Giannina	30	12	6	12	36	40	−4	42	Qualification for the Europa League second qualifying round (Note: The fifth-placed team of the 2015–16 Super League Greece Panionios would have qualified for the UEFA Europa League second qualifying round, but were excluded from participating in the 2016–17 European competitions by UEFA for financial reasons. As a result, the berth was given to the sixth-placed team PAS Giannina.)

Source: Super League Greece
Rules for classification: 1) Points; 2) Head-to-head points; 3) Head-to-head goal difference; 4) Goals scored; 5) Goals against; 6) Play-offs (neutral ground); 7) Draw.
(Note: Criteria 6 is only used if needed to decide champion, teams for relegation or teams for UEFA competitions).

==== Results summary ====
Overall								Home						Away					
Pld	W	D	L	GF	GA	GD	Pts	W	D	L	GF	GA	GD	W	D	L	GF	GA	GD
30	13	9	8	45	32	+13	48	9	4	2	24	12	+12	4	5	6	21	20	+1

Last updated: 5 February 2017.
Source: Competitive matches

==== Results by round ====
Round	1	2	3	4	5	6	7	8	9	10	11	12	13	14	15	16	17	18	19	20	21	22	23	24	25	26	27	28	29	30
Ground	H	A	A	H	A	H	A	H	A	H	H	A	H	A	H	H	H	A	A	H	A	H	A	H	A	A	H	A	H	A
Result	D	L	W	W	W	L	D	W	L	D	D	W	W	D	W	W	W	D	L	D	L	L	D	W	L	W	W	L	W	D
Position	9	12	9	5	3	5	5	4	6	6	6	6	4	4	3	4	4	3	4	4	4	5	5	4	4	4	4	5	5	4

Source: League matches
A = Away; H = Home; W = Win; D = Draw; L = Loss

==== Matches ====
23 August 2015 1	PAOK	0–0	Xanthi	Thessaloniki
19:15 EET	Leovac (yellow card) 4'; Savvidis (yellow card) 70'	Report	(yellow card) 47' Bertos; (yellow card) 59' Soltani; (yellow card) 76' Papasterianos; (yellow card) 80' Fliskas; (yellow card) 87' Baxevanidis	Stadium: Toumba Stadium; Referee: Michalis Koukoulakis

30 August 2015 2	PAS Giannina	3–1	PAOK	Ioannina
21:30 EET	Manias 4'; Sabo 51' (o.g.); Chávez 75' (yellow card) 48'; Ferfelis (yellow card) 87'	Report	(yellow card) 23' Kaçe; (yellow card) 42' Sabo; (yellow card) 45' (yellow-red card) 62' Jairo; 90+2' Vítor	Stadium: Zosimades Stadium; Referee: Athanasios Giaxos

12 September 2015 3	Veria	0–3	PAOK	Veria
18:15 EET	Marangos (yellow card) 54'; Nastos (yellow card) 90'	Report	17' Athanasiadis; 25' Mak; (yellow card) 54' Kitsiou; 55' Tziolis	Stadium: Veria Stadium; Referee: Michalis Voskakis

23 September 2015 4	PAOK	2–1	AEK Athens	Thessaloniki
20:30 EET	Konstantinidis (yellow card) 26'; Rodrigues 54'; Athanasiadis 84'; Tzavellas (yellow card) 86'	Report	(yellow card) 39' Vargas; (yellow card) 43' Buonanotte; 47' Aravidis; (yellow card) 67' Simões; (yellow card) 90+4' Mantalos	Stadium: Toumba Stadium; Referee: Anastasios Sidiropoulos

27 September 2015 5	Atromitos	1–2	PAOK	Peristeri, Athens
20:30 EET	Godoy (yellow card) 24'; Umbides 63'; Usero (yellow card) 70'; Harbunow (yellow card) 82'; Kivrakidis (yellow card) 83'; Garcia (yellow card) 90+3'	Report	72' Berbatov; 90' Mak	Stadium: Peristeri Stadium; Referee: Charalampos Kalogeropoulos

4 October 2015 6	PAOK	0–2	Olympiacos	Thessaloniki
20:30 EET	Tzavellas (yellow card) 37'; Ricardo Costa (yellow card) 48'	Report	(yellow card) 16' Durmaz; 27' Ideye; 36' Milivojević; (yellow card) 41' Kasami; (yellow card) 72' Sebá; (yellow card) 79' Botía	Stadium: Toumba Stadium; Referee: Athanasios Giaxos

18 October 2015 7	Iraklis	3–3	PAOK	Thessaloniki
20.30 EET	Makris 14'; Vellios (yellow card) 15' (goal) 43'; Intzoglou (yellow card) 56'; Bartolini (yellow card) 90+1' (goal) 90+2'	Report	35' Pelkas; 65' (penalty missed) 90' Berbatov; 77' (yellow card) 90+1' Tzavellas; (yellow card) 84' Leovac	Stadium: Kaftanzoglio Stadium; Attendance: TBD; Referee: Michalis Koukoulakis

25 October 2015 8	PAOK	3–1	Panathinaikos	Thessaloniki
19:30 EET	Berbatov 27'; Rodrigues 31'; Vítor 42' (yellow card) 44'; Tzavellas (yellow card) 47'; Leovac (yellow card) 74'; Mak (yellow card) 84'	Report	(yellow card) 27' Marinakis; 74' Karelis	Stadium: Toumba Stadium; Referee: Alexandros Aretopoulos

1 November 2015 9	Asteras Tripolis	2–1	PAOK	Tripoli
15:00 EET	Giannou (yellow card) 38'; Bertoglio 49'; Iglesias (yellow card) 64'; Sankaré 82'	Report	23' Pelkas; (yellow card) 39' Vítor; (yellow card) 72' Sabo	Stadium: Theodoros Kolokotronis Stadium; Referee: Andreas Pappas

8 November 2015 10	PAOK	3–3	Panthrakikos	Thessaloniki
17:15 EET	Rodrigues 14', 47'; Athanasiadis 61'; Mak (yellow card) 87'; Tziolis (yellow card) 90'	Report	25' Papageorgiou; 42', 77' (yellow card) 71' Baykara; (yellow card) 45' (yellow-red card) 90+3' Mejía; (yellow card) 54' Chasomeris; (yellow card) 67' Cherfa; (yellow card) 87' Paschalakis	Stadium: Toumba Stadium; Referee: Alexandros Dimitropoulos

22 November 2015 11	PAOK	0–0	Panetolikos	Thessaloniki
15:00 EET	Kitsiou (yellow card) 42'; Pelkas (yellow card) 61'; Rodrigues (yellow card) 90+4'	Report	(yellow card) 28' Papoutsogianopoulos; (yellow card) 42' Rusculleda; (yellow card) 63' Kousas	Stadium: Toumba Stadium; Referee: Anastasios Sidiropoulos

30 November 2015 12	Kalloni	1–3	PAOK	Mytilene
19:30 EET	Manousos 41' (pen.); Keita (yellow card) 85' (yellow-red card) 90+3'; Tsabouris (yellow card) 90+1'	Report	7', 76', (yellow card) 26' Athanasiadis; (yellow card) 22' Leovac; (yellow card) 40' Skondras; (yellow card) 68' Golasa; 90' Mystakidis; (yellow card) 90+3' Konstantinidis; (yellow card) 90+3' Kaçe	Stadium: Mytilene Municipal Stadium; Referee: Ioannis Delfakis

6 December 2015 13	PAOK	2–1	Panionios	Thessaloniki
15:00 EET	Mak 11'; Tzavellas 79' (yellow card) 44'; Tziolis (yellow card) 89'	Report	47' Oikonomou; (yellow card) 31' Chatziisaias; (yellow card) 46' Risvanis; (yellow card) 66' Dioudis; (yellow card) 67' Chalkiadakis	Stadium: Toumba Stadium; Referee: Aristeidis Vatsios

14 December 2015 14	Levadiakos	0–0	PAOK	Livadeia
19:30 EET	Moulopoulos (yellow card) 38'	Report	(yellow card) 90+3' Kaçe; (yellow card) 38' Athanasiadis; (yellow card) 90+5' Leovac	Stadium: Levadia Municipal Stadium; Referee: Alexandros Aretopoulos

20 December 2015 15	PAOK	1–0	Platanias	Thessaloniki
15:00 EET	Athanasiadis 67'; Tzavellas (yellow card) 87'; Leovac (yellow card) 90+2'; Melissas (yellow card) 90+3'	Report	(yellow card) 71' Munafo	Stadium: Toumba Stadium; Referee: Christos Mitsios

10 January 2016 17	PAOK	3–1	PAS Giannina	Thessaloniki
15:00 EET	Athanasiadis 43'; Tzavellas (yellow card) 50'; Charisis 52'; Jairo 64' Manager: (Croatia) Igor Tudor	Report	(yellow card) 33' Giakos; (yellow card) 46' Skondras; 90' Kozoronis Manager: (Greece) Giannis Petrakis	Stadium: Toumba Stadium; Referee: George Kyzas

17 January 2016 18	PAOK	2–1	Veria	Thessaloniki
17:15 EET	Berbatov 43'; Athanasiadis (yellow card) 64' (goal) 74'; Kaçe (yellow card) 87' Manager: (Croatia) Igor Tudor	Report	(yellow card) 64' Ostojić; 65' Majewski; (yellow card) 76' Georgiadis; (yellow card) 80' Nastos Manager: (Greece) Giorgos Georgiadis	Stadium: Toumba Stadium; Referee: Alexandros Dimitropoulos

20 January 2016 16	Xanthi	1–1	PAOK	Xanthi
19:30 EET	Lisgaras (yellow card) 69'; Triadis (yellow card) 77'; Soltani 90+1' Manager: (Romania) Răzvan Lucescu	Report	(yellow card) 20' Charisis; (yellow card) 25' Korovesis; 31' Mystakidis; (yellow card) 75' Rodrigues Manager: (Croatia) Igor Tudor	Stadium: Xanthi FC Arena; Referee: Marios Lambropoulos

24 January 2016 19	AEK Athens	1–0	PAOK	Athens
19:30 EET	Barbosa (yellow card) 31'; Vargas 33'; Dídac (yellow card) 37'; Aravidis (yellow card) 85' Manager: (Uruguay) Gus Poyet	Report	(yellow card) 9' Athanasiadis; (yellow card) 33' Mak; (yellow card) 66' (yellow-red card) 83' Berbatov; (yellow card) 79' Charisis Manager: (Croatia) Igor Tudor	Stadium: Olympic Stadium; Referee: Athanasios Giahos

30 January 2016 20	PAOK	1–1	Atromitos	Thessaloniki
19:30 EET	Mak 30' (yellow card) 31'; Pelkas (yellow card) 68'; Korovesis (yellow card) 79' Manager: (Croatia) Igor Tudor	Report	(yellow card) 78' Keita; 81' Lazaridis; (yellow card) 90+2' Barkas Manager: (Greece) Traianos Dellas	Stadium: Toumba Stadium; Referee: Andreas Pappas

7 February 2016 21	Olympiacos	1–0	PAOK	Piraeus
19:30 EET	Elabdellaoui 8'; Milivojević (yellow card) 33'; Botía (yellow card) 58'; Zdjelar (yellow card) 60' (yellow-red card) 61'; Fuster (yellow card) 87' Manager: (Portugal) Marco Silva	Report	(yellow card) 17' Cimirot; (yellow card) 50' (yellow-red card) 65' Tzavellas; (yellow card) 61' Athanasiadis Manager: (Croatia) Igor Tudor	Stadium: Karaiskakis Stadium; Referee: Alexandros Dimitropoulos

14 February 2016 22	PAOK	0–1	Iraklis	Thessaloniki
19:30 EET	Kaçe (yellow card) 34'; Vítor (red card) 90+2' Manager: (Croatia) Igor Tudor	Report	(yellow card) 39' Saramantas; (yellow card) 44' Karasalidis; (yellow card) 55' Tsilianidis; (yellow card) 58' Boukouvalas; 72' Leozinho; (yellow card) 90+2' Pourtoulidis Manager: (Greece) Nikos Papadopoulos	Stadium: Toumba Stadium; Referee: Dimitris Thanos

21 February 2016 23	Panathinaikos	2–2	PAOK	Athens
19:30 EET	Berg 10' (yellow card) 86'; Pranjić (yellow card) 18'; Lagos (yellow card) 28'; Koutroumpis (yellow card) 42'; Kaltsas 51'; Lod (yellow card) 62' Manager: (Italy) Andrea Stramaccioni	Report	(yellow card) 20' (goal) 56' Cimirot; (yellow card) 40' Malezas; (yellow card) 42' (yellow-red card) 90+1' Charisis; 67' (yellow card) 90' Pelkas; (yellow card) 70' Chatziisaias; (yellow card) 78' Kitsiou Manager: (Croatia) Igor Tudor	Stadium: Leoforos Alexandras Stadium; Referee: George Kominis

27 February 2016 24	PAOK	2–0	Asteras Tripolis	Thessaloniki
19:30 EET	Pelkas 17'; Chatziisaias (yellow card) 36'; Kitsiou (yellow card) 36'; Leovac (yellow card) 39'; Antonis (yellow card) 49'; Mak 76' Manager: (Croatia) Igor Tudor	Report	(yellow card) 21' Panteliadis; (yellow card) 39' Lluy; (yellow card) 41' Dimoutsos Manager: (Greece) Dimitris Terezopoulos	Stadium: Toumba Stadium; Referee: Alexandros Aretopoulos

6 March 2016 25	Panthrakikos	2–1	PAOK	Komotini
15:00 EET	Igor 50'; Ladakis (yellow card) 78'; Papageorgiou 88'; Giorgos Athanasiadis (yellow card) 90' Manager: (Greece) Giannis Xatzinikolaou	Report	21' Chatziisaias; (yellow card) 76' Antonis Manager: (Croatia) Igor Tudor	Stadium: Komotini Municipal Stadium; Referee: Michalis Voskakis

12 March 2016 26	Panetolikos	0–3	PAOK	Agrinio
19:30 EET	Amr Warda (yellow card) 41'; Chantakias (yellow card) 71'; Makos (yellow card) 83' Manager: (Greece) Giannis Matzourakis	Report	22' 39' Athanasiadis; 69' Korovesis; (yellow card) 89' Kitsiou Manager: (Serbia) Vladimir Ivić	Stadium: Panetolikos Stadium; Referee: Anastasios Sidiropoulos

20 March 2016 27	PAOK	3–0	AEL Kalloni	Thessaloniki
17:15 EET	Mystakidis 28'; Charisis (yellow card) 46'; Athanasiadis 58'; Korovesis 78' Manager: (Serbia) Vladimir Ivić	Report	Manager: (Greece) Nikos Karageorgiou	Stadium: Toumba Stadium; Referee: Dimitris Karantonis

3 April 2016 28	Panionios	3–1	PAOK	Nea Smyrni, Athens
19:00 EET	Bakasetas 39' 66'; Dioudis (yellow card) 61'; Tasoulis (yellow card) 76'; Siopis (yellow card) 90'; Ansarifard 82' Manager: (Greece) Marinos Ouzounidis	Report	(yellow card) 27' Vítor; 52' Tziolis; (yellow card) 87' Athanasiadis Manager: (Serbia) Vladimir Ivić	Stadium: Nea Smyrni Stadium; Referee: Anastasios Papapetrou

10 April 2017 29	PAOK	2–0	Levadiakos	Thessaloniki
19:00 EET	Leovac 80'; Mak 89'; Vítor (yellow card) 90+1'	Report	(yellow card) 6' Machairas; (yellow card) 19' Belghazouani	Stadium: Toumba Stadium; Referee: Ioannis Delfakis

17 April 2016 30	Platanias	0–0	PAOK	Chania, Crete
19:00 EET	(yellow card) 1' Banana	Report	Tzavellas (yellow card) 88'	Stadium: Perivolia Municipal Stadium; Referee: Stavros Madalos

=== Play-offs ===
==== Table ====
Pos	Team	Pld	W	D	L	GF	GA	GD	Pts	Qualification
2	PAOK	6	3	3	0	8	3	+5	12	Qualification for the Champions League third qualifying round
3	Panathinaikos	6	2	3	1	8	6	+2	11	Qualification for the Europa League third qualifying round (Note: AEK Athens qualified for the Europa League third qualifying round by winning the Greek Cup.)
4	AEK Athens	6	2	1	3	5	7	−2	9	Qualification for the Europa League third qualifying round
5	Panionios (Note: The fifth-placed team of the 2015–16 Super League Greece Panionios would have qualified for the Europa League second qualifying round, but were excluded from participating in the 2016–17 European competitions by UEFA for financial reasons. As a result, the berth was given to the sixth-placed team PAS Giannina.)	6	1	1	4	2	7	−5	4	

Source: Super League Greece: Standings, Schedule
Rules for classification: 1) Points; 2) Head-to-head points; 3) Head-to-head goal difference; 4) Goals scored; 5) Goals against; 6) Regular season position.

==== Matches ====
11 May 2016 1	PAOK	2–1	AEK Athens	Thessaloniki
20:30 EET	Tziolis (yellow card) 38'; Glykos (yellow card) 45'; Kitsiou (yellow card) 50'; Rodrigues 61'; Skondras (yellow card) 81'; Mystakidis 83'	Report	(yellow card) 24' Simões; (yellow card) 37' Djebbour; 44' Johansson; (yellow card) 50' Vargas	Stadium: Toumba Stadium; Referee: Stavros Madalos

15 May 2016 2	Panathinaikos	1–1	PAOK	Athens
20:30 EET	Koutroubis (yellow card) 37'; Berg 46'; Tavlaridis (yellow card) 85'	Report	(red card) 20' Tziolis; 49' Charisis; (yellow card) 52' Malezas; (yellow card) 85' Tzavellas	Stadium: Leoforos Alexandras Stadium; Referee: George Kyzas

23 May 2016 3	Panionios	0–2	PAOK	Nea Smyrni
18:15 EET	(yellow card) 34' (yellow-red card) 90+2' Ikonomou	Report	27' Athanasiadis; (yellow card) 46' Pelkas; (yellow card) 61' Charisis; 77' Mak; (yellow card) 89' Skondras	Stadium: Nea Smyrni Stadium; Referee: Alexandros Aretopoulos

26 May 2016 4	PAOK	2–0	Panionios	Thessaloniki
18:15 EET	Athanasiadis 14' 25'	Report		Stadium: Toumba Stadium; Referee: Ioannis Delfakis

29 May 2016 5	AEK Athens	0–0	PAOK	Athens
20:00 EET	Barbosa (yellow card) 26'; Pekhart (yellow card) 41' (yellow-red card) 49'	Report	(red card) 31' Tzavellas; (yellow card) 42' Mak; (yellow card) 65' Kaçe; (yellow card) 80' Athanasiadis; (yellow card) 90+3' Glykos	Stadium: Olympic Stadium; Referee: Athanasios Giahos

31 May 2016 6	PAOK	1–1	Panathinaikos	Thessaloniki
20:15 EET	Rodrigues 17'; Vítor (yellow card) 57'; Leovac (yellow card) 64'; Glykos (yellow card) 90+3'	Report	26' Lod; (yellow card) 34' Evangelista; (yellow card) 43' Klonaridis; (yellow card) 62' Mesto; (yellow card) 79' Zeca; (yellow card) 89' Nano	Stadium: Toumba Stadium; Referee: Alexandros Aretopoulos

=== Greek Football Cup ===
==== Group stage ====
Pos	Team	Pld	W	D	L	GF	GA	GD	Pts	Qualification
1	PAOK	3	2	1	0	9	3	+6	7	Round of 16
2	Chania	3	1	1	1	6	9	−3	4	Round of 16
3	Panthrakikos	3	1	1	1	3	4	−1	4	
4	Olympiacos Volos	3	0	1	2	2	4	−2	1	

Source: epo.gr

28 October 2015 1	PAOK	2–0	Panthrakikos	Thessaloniki
17:15 EET	Pelkas 73'; Mak 86'	Report	Papachristos (yellow card) 57'; Rogerio (yellow card) 67'	Stadium: Toumba Stadium; Referee: Anastasios Sidiropoulos

3 December 2015 2	Chania	2–6	PAOK	Chania
17:15 EET	Stamatis 3'; Lita 79'; Brilakis (yellow card) 30' (yellow-red card) 45'	Report	Jairo 73'; Sabo 23', 41', 85'; Mystakidis 61'; Pelkas 64'; Konstantinidis (yellow card) 36'; Olsen (yellow card) 78'	Stadium: Perivolia Municipal Stadium; Referee: Michael Koukoulakis

17 December 2015 3	Olympiacos Volos	1–1	PAOK	Volos
15:00 EET	Alamanis 32'; Nastos (yellow card) 41'	Report	Dimitriadis 16'; Korovesis (yellow card) 57'	Stadium: Volos Municipal Stadium; Referee: Spiridon Stathopoulos

==== Round of 16 ====
6 January 2016 1st leg	Kalloni	2–1	PAOK	Mytilene
19:30 EET	Anastasiadis 3'; Kaltsas (yellow card) 24'; Georgiou 79'	Report	(yellow card) 56' Charisis; 89' Mak	Stadium: Mytilene Municipal Stadium; Referee: Dimitrios Karantonis

14 January 2016 2nd leg	PAOK	3–0 (4–2 agg.)	Kalloni	Thessaloniki
17:15 EET	Mak (yellow card) 22' (goal) 65'; Athanasiadis 58'; Berbatov 86'	Report	Mikić (yellow card) 10'	Stadium: Toumba Stadium; Referee: Georgios Kominis

==== Quarter-finals ====
27 January 2016 1st leg	Panionios	1–1	PAOK	Nea Smyrni
15:45 EET	Masouras 35'; Ansarifard (yellow card) 40'; Risvanis (yellow card) 67'; Siopis (yellow card) 85'	Report	15' (yellow card) 39'Pelkas; (yellow card) 56'Athanasiadis; (yellow card) 73'Cimirot; (yellow card) 79'Skondras	Stadium: Nea Smyrni Stadium; Referee: Michahl Boskakhs

11 February 2016 2nd leg	PAOK	0–0 (1–1 agg.)	Panionios	Thessaloniki
19:30 EET	Vítor (yellow card) 51'; Berbatov (yellow card) 59'; Mak (yellow card) 60'	Report	(yellow card) 41'Ansarifard; (yellow card) 58'Bakasetas; (yellow card) 81'Bargan; (yellow card) 85'Nikos Katharios; (yellow card) 85'Risvanis	Stadium: Toumba Stadium; Referee: Athanasios Tzilos

==== Semi-finals ====
2 March 2016 1st leg	PAOK	0–3^{1}	Olympiacos	Thessaloniki
19:30 EET		Report		Stadium: Toumba Stadium; Referee: Mhtsios

27 April 2016 2nd leg	Olympiacos	3–0^{2}	PAOK
17:00 EET

^{1} Match abandoned in the 90th minute with the score at 1–2. It was later rewarded as a 0–3 win for Olympiacos.
^{2} PAOK didn't show up to the match, so Olympiacos was awarded a 3–0 walkover

=== UEFA Europa League ===
==== Second qualifying round ====
All times at CET

16 July 2015 1st leg	Lokomotiva (Croatia)	2–1	(Greece) PAOK	Zagreb, Croatia
18:00 CET	Kolar 30'; Andrijašević 45+1'	Report	(yellow card) 82' Tzavellas; 90+2' Mak	Stadium: Stadion Kranjčevićeva; Attendance: 1,000; Referee: Yuriy Mozharovsky (Ukraine)

23 July 2015 2nd leg	PAOK (Greece)	6–0 (7–2 agg.)	(Croatia) Lokomotiva	Thessaloniki, Greece
20:00 CET	Lucas 3', (yellow card) 73'; Mak 7', 84'; Pelkas 14'; Kitsiou (yellow card) 15', (goal) 34'; Tziolis (yellow card) 29'; Andrijašević 59' (o.g.)	Report		Stadium: Toumba Stadium; Attendance: 11,861; Referee: Carlos Xistra (Portugal)

==== Third qualifying round ====
30 July 2015 1st leg	PAOK (Greece)	1–0	(Slovakia) Spartak Trnava	Thessaloniki, Greece
19:00 CET	Lucas 82'	Report		Stadium: Toumba Stadium; Attendance: TBD; Referee: Svein-Erik Edvartsen (Norway)

6 August 2015 2nd leg	Spartak Trnava (Slovakia)	1–1 (1–2 agg.)	(Greece) PAOK	Zlaté Moravce, Slovakia
20:05 CET	Sabo 35' (pen.)	Report	Konstantinidis 48'	Stadium: Štadión FC ViOn; Attendance: TBD; Referee: Tobias Welz (Germany)

==== Play-off round ====
20 August 2015 1st leg	PAOK (Greece)	5–0	(Denmark) Brøndby	Thessaloniki, Greece
19:00 CET	Mak 17', 80', 82'; Pelkas 36'; Rodrigues 51'	Report		Stadium: Toumba Stadium; Attendance: TBD; Referee: Alberto Undiano Mallenco (Spain)

27 August 2015 2nd leg	Brøndby (Denmark)	1–1 (1–6 agg.)	(Greece) PAOK	Brøndby, Denmark
20:00 CET	Rashani 27'	Report	Costa 21'	Stadium: Brøndby Stadium; Attendance: TBD; Referee: Paolo Tagliavento (Italy)

==== Group stage ====
Pos	Team	Pld	W	D	L	GF	GA	GD	Pts	Qualification	KRA	DOR	PAOK	QAB
1	(Russia) Krasnodar	6	4	1	1	9	4	+5	13	Advance to knockout phase	—	1–0	2–1	2–1
2	(Germany) Borussia Dortmund	6	3	1	2	10	5	+5	10	Advance to knockout phase	2–1	—	0–1	4–0
3	(Greece) PAOK	6	1	4	1	3	3	0	7		0–0	1–1	—	0–0
4	(Azerbaijan) Gabala	6	0	2	4	2	12	−10	2		0–3	1–3	0–0	—

Source: Soccerway
Rules for classification: Group stage tiebreakers

17 September 2015 1	Gabala (Azerbaijan)	0–0	(Greece) PAOK	Baku, Azerbaijan
19:00 CEST (UTC+02:00)		Report		Stadium: Bakcell Arena; Referee: Javier Estrada Fernández (Spain)

1 October 2015 2	PAOK (Greece)	1–1	(Germany) Borussia Dortmund	Thessaloniki, Greece
21:05	Mak 34'	Report	Castro 72'	Stadium: Toumba Stadium; Referee: Anthony Taylor (England)

22 October 2015 3	PAOK (Greece)	0–0	(Russia) Krasnodar	Thessaloniki, Greece
21:05		Report		Stadium: Toumba Stadium; Referee: Andreas Ekberg (Sweden)

5 November 2015 4	Krasnodar (Russia)	2–1	(Greece) PAOK	Krasnodar, Russia
19:00	Ari 33'; Joãozinho 67' (pen.)	Report	Mak 90+1'	Stadium: Kuban Stadium; Referee: Arnold Hunter (Northern Ireland)

26 November 2015 5	PAOK (Greece)	0–0	(Azerbaijan) Gabala	Thessaloniki, Greece
21:05 CET (UTC+01:00)		Report		Stadium: Toumba Stadium; Referee: Jakob Kehlet (Denmark)

10 December 2015 6	Borussia Dortmund (Germany)	0–1	(Greece) PAOK	Dortmund, Germany
19:00		Report	Mak 33'	Stadium: Signal Iduna Park; Referee: Mattias Gestranius (Finland)

== Statistics ==
=== Squad statistics ===
				Total				Super League Greece		UEFA Europa League		Greek Cup		UEFA play-offs		
N	Pos.	Name	Nat.	GS	App	Gls	Min	App	Gls	App	Gls	App	Gls	App	Gls	Notes
1	GK	Markos Vellidis	(Greece)	13	13			11				2				
2	DF	Giannis Skondras	(Greece)	17	25			7		7		5		6		
4	DF	Marin Leovac	(Croatia)	27	30	1		19	1	2		3		6		
5	DF	Dimitris Chatziisaias	(Greece)	7	9	1		6	1			1		2		
6	MF	Alexandros Tziolis	(Greece)	44	46	2		27	2	11		3		5		
7	MF	Eyal Golasa	(Israel)	8	17			11		2		4				
9	FW	Jairo	(Brazil)	13	22	2		13	1	3		4	1	2		
10	FW	Dimitar Berbatov	(Bulgaria)	10	24	5		14	4	5		3	1	2		
11	FW	Róbert Mak	(Slovakia)	42	45	19		24	6	12	9	5	3	4	1	
13	DF	Stelios Malezas	(Greece)	21	25			12		5		2		6		
15	DF	Miguel Vítor	(Portugal)	37	38	2		23	2	8		4		3		
16	MF	Gojko Cimirot	(Bosnia and Herzegovina)	23	25	1		13	1	1		5		6		
21	MF	Charis Charisis	(Greece)	18	23	2		14	1	2		3		4	1	
22	DF	Dimitris Konstantinidis	(Greece)	11	15	1		9		5	1	1				
24	FW	Garry Rodrigues	(Cape Verde)	30	37	7		20	4	9	1	2		6	2	
26	MF	Ergys Kaçe	(Albania)	25	32			19		10		1		2		
27	FW	Giannis Mystakidis	(Greece)	11	30	5		16	3	8		4	1	2	1	
30	GK	Nikos Melissas	(Greece)	4	5			2				3				
31	DF	Georgios Tzavellas	(Greece)	43	44	2		26	2	10		4		4		
33	FW	Athanasiadis	(Greece)	30	38	15		22	11	4		6	1	6	3	
34	MF	Nikos Korovesis	(Greece)	11	19	2		12	2	2		4		1		
52	MF	Erik Sabo	(Slovakia)	14	24	3		14		6		4	3			
70	DF	Stelios Kitsiou	(Greece)	30	32	1		17		8	1	2		5		
71	GK	Panagiotis Glykos	(Greece)	19	19			7		5		1		6		
77	MF	Dimitrios Pelkas	(Greece)	41	48	9		28	4	10	2	6	3	4		
93	MF	Terry Antonis	(Australia)	3	6			4				2				
25	GK	Robin Olsen	(Sweden)	19	19			11		7		1				^{2}
20	DF	Ricardo Costa	(Portugal)	21	22	1		11		10	1	1				^{2}
	MF	Kyriakos Savvidis	(Greece)		6			1		4		1				
	FW	Efthimis Koulouris	(Greece)	3	4					4						
	FW	Lucas Pérez	(Spain)	2	2	2				2	2					^{1}
	MF	Anastasios Dimitriadis	(Greece)	1	2	1		1				1	1			
	DF	Răzvan Raț	(Romania)		2					2						^{1}
	DF	Hedwiges Maduro	(Netherlands)		2					2						^{1}
	DF	Deligiannidis	(Greece)	1	2					1		1				
	FW	Dimitris Salpingidis	(Greece)	1	1					1						^{1}
	MF	Giorgos Kakko	(Albania)	1	2			1				1				
	FW	Kristian Kushta	(Albania)		2			1				1				
	DF	Poungouras	(Greece)		1					1						
	MF	Panagiotoudis	(Greece)		1							1				
	MF	Ktistopoulos	(Greece)		1							1				
	DF	Tselepidis	(Greece)	1	1							1				
	MF	Patralis	(Greece)	1	1							1				
	DF	Topalidis	(Greece)	1	1							1				
	DF	Syrakos	(Greece)	1	1							1				

Last updated: May 2016
Source: Match reports in competitive matches, superleaguegreece.net, uefa.com, paokfc.gr
Ordered by squad number
0 shown as blank
Note:
^{1} Players left the club in summer TW
^{2} Players left the club in winter TW

=== Goalscorers ===
Rank	No.	Pos.	Player	League	Cup	Europa League	Play-offs	Total
1	11	MF	(Slovakia) Róbert Mak	6	3	9	1	19
2	33	FW	(Greece) Stefanos Athanasiadis	11	1	0	3	15
3	77	FW	(Greece) Dimitrios Pelkas	4	3	2	0	9
4	24	FW	(Cape Verde) Garry Rodrigues	4	0	1	2	7
5	10	FW	(Bulgaria) Dimitar Berbatov	4	1	0	0	5
	27	FW	(Greece) Giannis Mystakidis	3	1	0	1	5
7	52	MF	(Slovakia) Erik Sabo	0	3	0	0	3
8		FW	(Spain) Lucas Pérez^{1}	0	0	2	0	2
9	9	FW	(Brazil) Jairo	1	1	0	0	2
	21	MF	(Greece) Charis Charisis	1	0	0	1	2
	34	MF	(Greece) Nikos Korovesis	2	0	0	0	2
	6	MF	(Greece) Alexandros Tziolis	2	0	0	0	2
	15	DF	(Portugal) Miguel Vítor	2	0	0	0	2
	31	DF	(Greece) Georgios Tzavellas	2	0	0	0	2
15	16	MF	(Bosnia and Herzegovina) Gojko Cimirot	1	0	0	0	1
	70	RB	(Greece) Stelios Kitsiou	0	0	1	0	1
	22	RB	(Greece) Dimitris Konstantinidis	0	0	1	0	1
18	4	LB	(Croatia) Marin Leovac	1	0	0	0	1
	80	MF	(Greece) Anastasios Dimitriadis	0	1	0	0	1
	5	DF	(Greece) Dimitris Chatziisaias	1	0	0	0	1
21		DF	(Portugal) Ricardo Costa^{1}	0	0	1	0	1
Own goals				0	0	1	0	1
TOTALS				45	14	18	8	85

^{1}Players left the club in transfer windows.

=== Disciplinary record ===
No.	Pos	Nat	Name	Super League			Europa League			Greek Cup			Playoffs			Total			Notes
No.	Pos	Nat	Name	Booked	(yellow card) (yellow-red card)	Sent off (straight red)	Booked	(yellow card) (yellow-red card)	Sent off (straight red)	Booked	(yellow card) (yellow-red card)	Sent off (straight red)	Booked	(yellow card) (yellow-red card)	Sent off (straight red)	Booked	(yellow card) (yellow-red card)	Sent off (straight red)	Notes
31	DF	(Greece)	Georgios Tzavellas	8	1		5						1		1	14	1	1	
11	MF	(Slovakia)	Róbert Mak	4			3			2			1			10			
33	FW	(Greece)	Athanasiadis	6						1			1			8			
4	DF	(Croatia)	Marin Leovac	7									1			8			
26	MF	(Albania)	Ergys Kaçe	5			1						1			7			
70	DF	(Greece)	Stelios Kitsiou	5			1						1			7			
77	MF	(Greece)	Dimitrios Pelkas	3			2			1			1			7			
15	DF	(Portugal)	Miguel Vítor	4		1				1			1			6		1	
21	MF	(Greece)	Charis Charisis	3	1					1			1			5	1		
22	DF	(Greece)	Konstantinidis	2			2			1						5			
6	MF	(Greece)	Alexandros Tziolis	2			1						1		1	4		1	
2	DF	(Greece)	Giannis Skondras	1					1	1			2			4		1	
24	FW	(Cape Verde)	Garry Rodrigues	2			1									3			
16	MF	(Bosnia and Herzegovina)	Gojko Cimirot	2						1						3			
20	FW	(Portugal)	Ricardo Costa	1			2									3			
71	GK	(Greece)	Panagiotis Glykos										3			3			
34	MF	(Greece)	Nikos Korovesis	2						1						3			
52	MF	(Slovakia)	Erik Sabo	2												2			
5	DF	(Greece)	Dimitris Chatziisaias	2												2			
93	MF	(Australia)	Terry Antonis	2												2			
25	GK	(Sweden)	Robin Olsen				1			1						2			
	FW	(Spain)	Lucas Pérez				2									2			
13	DF	(Greece)	Stelios Malezas	1									1			2			
10	FW	(Bulgaria)	Dimitar Berbatov		1					1						1	1		
7	MF	(Israel)	Eyal Golasa	1												1			
30	GK	(Greece)	Nikos Melissas	1												1			
88	MF	(Greece)	Kyriakos Savvidis	1												1			
80	MF	(Greece)	Anastasios Dimitriadis							1						1			
9	FW	(Brazil)	Jairo		1			1									2		
			TOTAL	67	4	1	21	1	1	13	0	0	16	0	2	117	5	4	

Last updated: 2017

Source: Match reports in competitive matches, superleaguegreece.net, uefa.com, paokfc.gr
Only competitive matches
Ordered by (red card) , (yellow card) (yellow-red card) and (yellow card)
(yellow card) = Number of bookings; (yellow card) (yellow-red card) = Number of sending offs after a second yellow card; (red card) = Number of sending offs by a direct red card.

0 shown as blank
