= Dimitrios Chatziisaias =

Greek footballer (born 1992)

Personal information
- Full name: Dimitrios Chatziisaias
- Date of birth: 21 September 1992 (age 34)
- Place of birth: Thessaloniki, Greece
- Height: 1.93 m (6 ft 4 in)
- Position: Centre-back

Youth career
- –2011: Omonia Stavroupoli

Senior career*
Years	Team	Apps	(Gls)
2011–2012	Vataniakos	19	(0)
2012–2013	Glyfada	19	(0)
2013–2014	Chania	36	(1)
2014–2016	Panionios	34	(1)
2016–2019	PAOK	8	(1)
2017–2019	→ Atromitos (loan)	55	(1)
2019–2021	Çaykur Rizespor	10	(0)
2020	→ Cercle Brugge (loan)	8	(0)
2021–2023	Atromitos	52	(1)
2023–2024	Punjab	20	(1)
2024–2025	Esteghlal Khuzestan	17	(1)
- * Club domestic league appearances and goals as of 21:00, 15 May 2025 (UTC)

Dimitrios Chatziisaias (Greek: Δημήτριος Χατζηισαΐας; born 21 September 1992) is a Greek professional footballer who plays as a centre-back.

== Career ==
=== Panionios ===
In June 2014 Panionios and AO Chania came to an agreement for the movement of Chatziisaias to the club based in Athens.

=== PAOK ===
On 29 January 2016, PAOK confirmed that Chatziisaias would join the club on 1 February 2016 from Panionios for a club record transfer fee of €1 million, after agreeing terms and signing a 3 1/2-year contract. He was presented to the media as a PAOK player on 1 February, where he was handed the number 5 shirt. Chatziisaias made his PAOK debut on 7 February, in a 1–0 away loss against champions Olympiacos. His first goal came a month later with a kick after an assist of Dimitrios Pelkas in PAOK's 2–1 away loss against Panthrakikos. On 19 August 2016, PAOK officially announced that the international defender is not in club's plans for the 2016–17 season. On 20 December 2016, Chatziisaias returned to the first team of PAOK immediately, in order to replace experienced international Georgios Tzavellas. Then, there were only stoppers Stelios Malezas, José Ángel Crespo and Fernando Varela in the current squad of the club, so his return was necessary ahead of the upcoming difficult matches in January.

==== Loan to Atromitos ====
On 26 June 2017, he signed a long season contract with Atromitos on loan from PAOK. On 30 June 2018, Greek central defender Chatziisaias will finally still be a member of ambitious Atromitos, on loan from PAOK until the end of 2018–19 season. The 26-year-old scored one goal (at 1–0 away victory over Asteras Tripolis in February) at 32 performances in the domestic competitions with the shirt of Austrian manager Damir Canadi's team during 2017–18 season.

=== Çaykur Rizespor ===
On 23 July 2019, Çaykur Rizespor announced the signing of Chatziisaias with a transfer fee in the region of €500,000, after the acquisition of Enea Mihaj from Panetolikos. PAOK would keep a resale rate of 20% and would also receive extra bonuses if Rizespor secures a European ticket for the upcoming season. Chatziisaias signed a three-year contract with a contract fee of €1,95 million.

==== Loan to Cercle Brugge ====
On 16 January 2020, Cercle Brugge and Çaykur Rizespor reached an agreement regarding the temporary transfer of Chatziisaias. Being on loan until the end of this season, there is a purchase option at the end.

=== Return to Atromitos ===
On 2 July 2021, his return to Atromitos was announced, having signed a two-year contract.

== Career statistics ==
=== Club ===
As of 13 May 2023

Club	Season	League			Cup		Continental		Other		Total	
Club	Season	Division	Apps	Goals	Apps	Goals	Apps	Goals	Apps	Goals	Apps	Goals
Chania	2013–14	Football League	36	1	3	0	—		—		39	1
Panionios	2014–15	Super League Greece	15	1	4	0	—		—		19	1
Panionios	2015–16	Super League Greece	19	0	4	0	—		—		23	0
Panionios	Total		34	1	8	0	—		—		42	1
PAOK	2015–16	Super League Greece	8	1	2	0	—		—		10	1
PAOK	2016–17	Super League Greece	0	0	0	0	—		—		0	0
PAOK	Total		8	1	2	0	—		—		10	1
Atromitos	2017–18 (loan)	Super League Greece	27	1	5	0	—		—		32	1
Atromitos	2018–19 (loan)	Super League Greece	28	0	5	0	2	0	—		35	0
Atromitos	2021–22	Super League Greece	21	0	0	0	—		—		21	0
Atromitos	2022–23	Super League Greece	31	1	2	0	—		—		33	1
Atromitos	Total		107	2	12	0	2	0	—		121	2
Çaykur Rizespor	2019–20	Süper Lig	9	0	3	0	—		—		12	0
Çaykur Rizespor	2020–21	Süper Lig	1	0	0	0	—		—		1	0
Çaykur Rizespor	Total		10	0	3	0	—		—		13	0
Cercle Brugge (loan)	2019–20	Belgian First Division A	8	0	0	0	—		—		8	0
Career total			204	4	28	0	2	0	0	0	234	5

== Honours ==
PAOK

- Greek Cup: 2016–17
