= Vasilios Pelkas =

Greek footballer

Personal information
- Date of birth: 16 October 1999 (age 27)
- Place of birth: Giannitsa, Greece
- Height: 1.84 m (6 ft 0 in)
- Position: Attacking midfielder

Team information
- Current team: Veria

Youth career
- –2016: Iraklis
- 2016–2017: Veria

Senior career*
| Years | Team | Apps | (Gls) |
| 2017–2018 | Ethnikos Giannitsa | | |
| 2018–2019 | Giannitsa | 20 | (1) |
| 2019–2022 | Trikala | 58 | (1) |
| 2022 | Iraklis | 0 | (0) |
| 2022–2023 | Almopos Aridea | 19 | (0) |
| 2023 | Apollon Pontus | 4 | (0) |
| 2024– | Veria | | |
- * Club domestic league appearances and goals as of 30 December 2023

Vasilios Pelkas (Greek: Βασίλειος Πέλκας; born 16 October 1999) is a Greek professional footballer who plays as an attacking midfielder for Veria

== Personal life ==
Pelkas' cousin, Dimitrios, is also a professional footballer.
