= Georgios Ktistopoulos =

Greek footballer

Personal information
- Full name: Georgios Ktistopoulos
- Date of birth: 17 August 1996 (age 30)
- Place of birth: Thessaloniki, Greece
- Height: 1.84 m (6 ft 1/2 in)
- Position: Attacking midfielder

Team information
- Current team: Pierikos

Youth career
- –2013: Apollon Kalamarias
- 2013–2014: Aris
- 2014–2016: PAOK

Senior career*
Years	Team	Apps	(Gls)
2016–	PAOK	0	(0)
2016–2017	→ Panserraikos (loan)	7	(0)
2017–	→ Pierikos (loan)	0	(0)

International career^{‡}
2013	Greece U19	1	(0)
2014	Greece U18	2	(1)
- * Club domestic league appearances and goals as of 6 July 2017 ‡ National team caps and goals as of 4 February 2017

Georgios Ktistopoulos (Greek: Γεώργιος Κτιστόπουλος; born 17 August 1996) is a Greek professional footballer who plays as an attacking midfielder for Pierikos, on loan from PAOK.

== Club career ==
On 12 August 2016, it was announced that Ktistopoulos signed a long year season contract with Panserraikos, on loan from PAOK.
