= Anastasios Dimitriadis =

Greek footballer

Personal information
- Date of birth: 27 February 1997 (age 29)
- Place of birth: Thessaloniki, Greece
- Height: 1.76 m (5 ft 9 1/2 in)
- Position: Attacking midfielder

Team information
- Current team: Egaleo
- Number: 11

Youth career
- –2012: Iraklis
- 2012–2016: PAOK

Senior career*
Years	Team	Apps	(Gls)
2016–2018	PAOK	1	(0)
2017	→ Michalovce (loan)	11	(0)
2017	→ Karaiskakis (loan)	25	(0)
2018–2019	Apollon Pontus	20	(2)
2019–2021	Chania	34	(2)
2021–2022	Xanthi	3	(1)
2022	Egaleo	13	(3)
2022–	Ilioupoli	19	(6)

International career^{‡}
2013–2014	Greece U17	6	(1)
2016	Greece U19	3	(3)
- * Club domestic league appearances and goals as of 16 June 2023 ‡ National team caps and goals as of 29 March 2016

Anastasios Dimitriadis (Greek: Αναστάσιος Δημητριάδης, born 27 February 1997) is a Greek professional footballer who plays as an attacking midfielder for Super League 2 club Egaleo.

== Career ==
=== PAOK ===
On 1 July 2016 PAOK announced the extension of his contract for four years. On 31 January 2017, he signed a six months loan with Slovak club MFK Zemplín Michalovce on loan from PAOK.
