= Nikos Melissas =

Greek footballer

Personal information
- Full name: Nikolaos Melissas
- Date of birth: 24 February 1993 (age 33)
- Place of birth: Leverkusen, Germany
- Height: 1.93 m (6 ft 4 in)
- Position: Goalkeeper

Team information
- Current team: AEL
- Number: 1

Youth career
- 2008–2012: PAOK

Senior career*
Years	Team	Apps	(Gls)
2012–2020	PAOK	2	(0)
2013	→ Fokikos (loan)	6	(0)
2014–2015	→ Iraklis Psachna (loan)	19	(0)
2016–2017	→ Sparta (loan)	23	(0)
2017–2019	→ Lamia (loan)	15	(0)
2019–2020	→ Volos (loan)	8	(0)
2020–2022	Panetolikos	24	(0)
2022–2025	Nea Salamina	75	(0)
2025–	AEL	13	(0)

International career
2011	Greece U19	1	(0)
- * Club domestic league appearances and goals as of 4 March 2026

Nikos Melissas (Greek: Νίκος Μελίσσας; born 24 February 1993) is a Greek professional footballer who plays as a goalkeeper for Super League 2 club AEL.

== Career ==
=== PAOK ===
==== Loan moves ====
On 10 August 2017, Melissas was given on loan to newly promoted side Lamia.

On 7 June 2018, his loan was extended by an additional year.

On 24 June 2019, he signed a new contract with PAOK, running until the summer of 2022.

== Career statistics ==
As of 12 January 2023

Club	Season	League		Cup		Continental		Other		Total	
Club	Season	Apps	Goals	Apps	Goals	Apps	Goals	Apps	Goals	Apps	Goals
Fokikos (loan)	2013–14	6	0	2	0	—		—		8	0
Iraklis Psachna (loan)	2014–15	19	0	3	0	—		—		22	0
PAOK	2015–16	2	0	3	0	0	0	—		5	0
Sparta (loan)	2016–17	23	0	3	0	—		—		26	0
Lamia (loan)	2017–18	4	0	5	0	—		—		9	0
Lamia (loan)	2018–19	11	0	5	0	—		—		16	0
Lamia (loan)	Total	15	0	10	0	—		—		25	0
Volos (loan)	2019–20	8	0	3	0	—		—		11	0
Panetolikos	2020–21	8	0	2	0	—		—		10	0
Panetolikos	2021–22	16	0	0	0	—		—		16	0
Panetolikos	Total	24	0	2	0	—		—		26	0
Nea Salamina	2022–23	17	0	1	0	—		—		18	0
Career total		114	0	27	0	0	0	0	0	141	0
