= Dimitrios Pelkas =

Greek footballer (born 1993)

Dimitris Pelkas
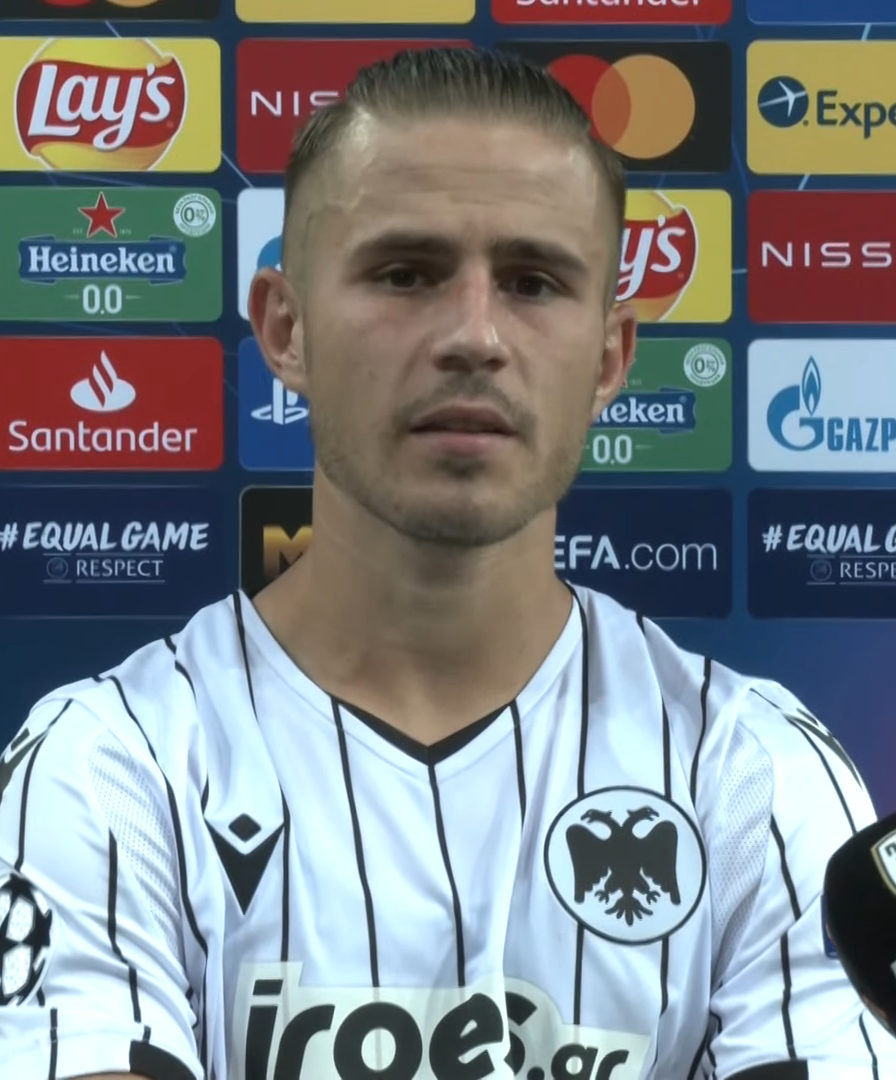
- Pelkas playing for PAOK in 2020

Personal information
- Full name: Dimitrios Pelkas
- Date of birth: 26 October 1993 (age 33)
- Place of birth: Giannitsa, Greece
- Height: 1.75 m (5 ft 9 in)
- Positions: Attacking midfielder; winger

Team information
- Current team: PAOK
- Number: 10

Youth career
- 2007–2012: PAOK

Senior career*
Years	Team	Apps	(Gls)
2012–2020	PAOK	125	(21)
2013–2014	→ Apollon Kalamarias (loan)	17	(7)
2014–2015	→ Vitória Setúbal (loan)	24	(2)
2020–2023	Fenerbahçe	55	(11)
2022–2023	→ Hull City (loan)	26	(2)
2023–2025	Istanbul Basaksehir	34	(6)
2025–	PAOK	32	(9)

International career^{‡}
2011–2012	Greece U19	3	(0)
2012–2013	Greece U20	3	(0)
2013–2015	Greece U21	5	(0)
2015–	Greece	47	(5)
- * Club domestic league appearances and goals as of 20 September 2026 ‡ National team caps and goals as of 8 September 2025

Dimitrios Pelkas (Greek: Δημήτριος Πέλκας; born 26 October 1993) is a Greek professional footballer who plays as an attacking midfielder for Super League Greece club PAOK and the Greece national team.

== Club career ==
=== PAOK ===
Pelkas made his club debut on 2 August, against Bnei Yehuda in the Europa League coming on for Apostolos Giannou. He scored his first professional goal in the return leg against Bnei Yehuda in a 4–1 home win. He made his league debut for the club on 3 September 2012 against Atromitos.

On 22 August 2013, Pelkas signed for a year contract with Apollon Kalamarias on loan from PAOK playing in the Football League. He has been among the top players of the club scoring 14 goals and making 10 assists.

On 7 July 2014, Pelkas signed a new one-year contract with Vitória on loan from PAOK playing in Portuguese Primeira Liga. Vitória guaranteed him playing time, and Pelkas in many games made the difference. Playing for Setubal, he heard that the Portuguese club will buy him against €350,000 and then sold him to Sporting for €1 million, but thankfully for PAOK that did not happen. The young midfielder will get his opportunities, as pointed out by Vitória's manager Domingos Paciência at the newspaper «Metrosport». "I spoke with the president of PAOK, Zisis Vryzas, and he told me that he (Pelkas) is a quality, talented player who needs time to show his abilities. At Vitória he will get his chances to show us what he's made of. The Portuguese league, as the Greek one has a lot of power and he must show us that he can handle it."

On 27 July 2015, Pelkas has signed a new contract with PAOK until 2018.

His indisputable best professional year so far eventually attracted the interest of many clubs among that of Sporting that based on his previous performance with Vitória is very likely to proceed with the acquisition of the player for an initial amount of €1,5 million, even if his clause reaches the €5 million. On 18 October 2015, Pelkas scored his first Super League goal with PAOK for the 2015–16 season against Iraklis in a 3–3 away draw. On 21 February 2016, he scored against rivals Panathinaikos helped his team to escape with a 2–2 away draw. On 27 February 2016, he opened the score in a 2–0 home Super League win against Asteras Tripolis. On 8 December 2016, he scored his first goal for the 2016–17 season, in a crucial 2–0 home UEFA Europa League win against Slovan Liberec ensuring club's progress to the next round. On 20 September 2017, Pelkas is undoubtedly the man of the match in the Greek Cup game of PAOK with Levadiakos with the Greek midfielder to fail in a penalty and a minute later to achieve a terrific goal.

On 29 September 2017, Pelkas agreed to a contract extension with PAOK, until the summer of 2021. On 30 September 2017, reached 100 appearances with the jersey of PAOK in all competitions. On 27 August 2017, he scored his first goal for the 2017–18 season in a 3–1 home game, against Kerkyra. On 15 October 2017, he scored in a 4–0 home win game against Lamia. On 10 December 2017, he scored a brace in a 4–0 home win game against rivals Panathinaikos. On 14 January 2018, he scored in a 3–0 away win game against Kerkyra On 3 February 2018, he opened the score in a crucial 3–1 away win against PAS Giannina, and PAOK remain in first place of the Super League on the road to the title of 2017–18 season. On 17 February 2018, after a frustrating first half, Pelkas opened the score in the 56th minute when a superb exchange of passes between Robert Mak, Maurício and Diego Biseswar ended with the latter teeing up international midfielder perfectly to slot home, secured yet another 2–0 win against Lamia for Răzvan Lucescu's unstoppable team, who only this week were named the world's top-ranked form team win 14 wins in a row in all competitions. On 12 May 2018, a late Pelkas tap-in helped PAOK overcome AEK Athens to lift the Greek Cup at the Olympic Stadium in Athens after an enthralling final ended in a deserved 2–0 win for the Salonica club, as PAOK retain Greek Cup to wreck AEK's double dream.

On 8 August 2018, Pelkas scored when José Ángel Crespo made an incredible pass for Léo Matos and the latter made enormous attempt by rolling back the ball to the penalty area with the Greek international pushing him to the net, in a 3–2 home win game for UEFA Champions League Third qualifying round, 1st leg against Spartak Moscow. On 4 October 2018, he scored after an assist from Léo Jabá in a 4–1 away emphatic win against BATE Borisov in Belarus for UEFA Europa League Group stage. On 18 February Pelkas opened the scoring in the fourth minute with a header following a precise free-kick from captain Vieirinha in a hammering 5–1 away win against Apollon Smyrnis in his rally to win the title after 34 years. On 14 April 2019, PAOK's winger was in the right place and the right time to pick up possession from a poor Nikola Jakimovski clearance, and he returned the ball with interest into the top left corner of Ögmundur Kristinsson's net, opening the score in a 1–1 away draw game against AEL.

At the beginning of 2019–20 season, Pelkas is one of PAOK's most experienced players within the squad, having made a total of 176 appearances for the Greek champions, which includes scoring 36 goals and providing 29 assists. The attacking midfielder played a crucial part in PAOK's quest for the double last season. The Greek international began the season as a consistent starter in newly appointed Portuguese manager Abel Ferreira's starting eleven. Pelkas, most comfortable playing as an attack-minded midfielder, was often played as the second striker behind either Chuba Akpom or Karol Świderski. On 4 March 2020, he scored a brace helping PAOK complete an incredible Greek Cup comeback by coming from 2–0 down to beat Olympiacos 3–2 in the first leg semi-final home game. Dimitris Pelkas’ midweek performance in the Greek Cup didn't go unnoticed at EA Sports after the Greek midfielder was rewarded with a FIFA 20 Man of the Match (MOTM) item for the game mode FIFA Ultimate Team.Pelkas received a special MOTM item in-game which sees the Greek international's in-game rating rise to 81 overall in the form of a commemorative card. Pelkas is the sixth Super League player to receive a commemorative card this season, joining the likes of Mathieu Valbuena, Youssef El Arabi (twice), Marko Livaja, Petros Mantalos, and Pape Abou Cissé.

On 25 August 2020, Pelkas scored for 2020–21 UEFA Champions League qualifying phase and play-off round against Beşiktaş after Christos Tzolis assist. On 22 September 2020, Pelkas scored by flicking Andrija Živković's ball past Matvei Safonov to give PAOK the lead as he missed an early penalty kick in a 2–1 away 2020–21 UEFA Champions League play-offs 1st leg loss against Krasnodar.

=== Fenerbahçe ===
On 5 October 2020, Pelkas joined Fenerbahçe for three years, with an option to extend for another year for a transfer fee of approximate €1.6 million. In Turkey, the Greek international will have annual earnings of €1.2 million while PAOK will maintain a 20% resale rate. On 18 October 2020, Pelkas scored in his debut with the club, after Ozan Tufan's assist, sealing a 3–2 away win against Göztepe S.K. On 28 February 2021, Fenerbahce, thanks to a great long shot by Pelkas in the 76th minute, got the victory against Trabzonspor, in his club effort to win the championship. On 18 April 2021, he scored the winning goal after Ozan Tufan's left-wing cross in the penalty area in a 2–1 away win against İstanbul Başakşehir.

During the first three months of the 2021–22 season, seems that Dimitris Pelkas will not stay in the ranks of Fenerbahçe for long. According to an article in the Cumhuriyet newspaper, the international midfielder is ready to leave the Turkish club, due to the match plan that his coach, Vitor Pereira, wants to implement. On 26 December 2021, Dimitris Pelkas scored his first goal since the beginning of the 2021–22 season and contributed to Fenerbahce's 2–0 victory over Yeni Malatyaspor. The Greek midfielder came as a substitute in the second half in place of İrfan Kahveci and with a wonderful slalom in 73' sealing the final score.

In January 2022, according to reports from the Turkish media, Fenerbahce is considering a proposal from Greece for Dimitris Pelkas. Pelkas had a great season in the 2020–21 season with her jersey Fenerbahce, as he scored eight times and shared seven assists in 34 games, but the season we are going through is not going so well. The international midfielder counts 19 games with “Fener” with only one goal and without sharing assists, in a total of 749 minutes. Fenerbahçe have already accepted proposals for his former football player PAOK, having received offers from Russia, Italy but also Hellas, but without naming the club that is interested in repatriating the international midfielder. On 12 February 2022, he scored sealing an away 2–1 win game against Giresunspor, putting an end to a bad course of six games, without a victory. On 17 February 2022, he scored after an assist from Ferdi Kadıoğlu in a 3–2 home loss against Slavia Prague for UEFA Europa Conference League. On 20 March 2022, with a perfect fake right shot in the 88th minute, Dimitris Pelkas helped his club to prevail 2–1 over Konyaspor.

==== Loan to Hull City ====
On 1 September 2022, Pelkas joined Hull City on a season-long loan spell. He made his debut on 4 September 2022, coming off the bench as a 77th-minute substitute for Ozan Tufan in the 2–0 home loss to Sheffield United. On 5 October 2022, Pelkas started the home match against Wigan Athletic, scoring Hull's first goal in a 2–1 win.

=== İstanbul Başakşehir F.K. ===
On 21 July 2023, Pelkas joined İstanbul Başakşehir F.K. for one year, with an option to extend for another year as a free transfer.

=== PAOK ===
On 24 January 2025, Pelkas returned to PAOK, signing a two-and-a-half year contract.

== International career ==
On 2 October 2015, interim Greece coach Kostas Tsanas called up midfielder Dimitris Pelkas for the match against Northern Ireland and Hungary for UEFA Euro 2016. "All players dream of someday representing their country and I am happy for this opportunity. It is an honour for me," said Pelkas. On 7 October 2015, he made his international debut as a substitute in the 3–1 away loss game against Northern Ireland. On 9 October 2021, he scored his first goal with Greece national team with a right footed shot from the right side of the box to the bottom right corner, sealing a vital 2–0 away win against Georgia, in its effort to qualify to the final phase of 2022 World Cup.

== Personal life ==
Pelkas' cousin, Vasilios, is also a professional footballer.

== Career statistics ==
=== Club ===
As of match played on 23 November 2025

Club	Season	League			National cup (Note: Includes Greek Football Cup, Taça de Portugal, Turkish Cup)		League cup (Note: Includes Taça da Liga)		Europe		Total	
Club	Season	Division	Apps	Goals	Apps	Goals	Apps	Goals	Apps	Goals	Apps	Goals
PAOK	2012–13	Super League Greece	10	0	3	0	–		3 (Note: Appearances in UEFA Europa League)	1	16	1
PAOK	2015–16	Super League Greece	32	4	7	3	–		10	2	49	9
PAOK	2016–17	Super League Greece	15	3	7	3	–		4	1	26	7
PAOK	2017–18	Super League Greece	23	8	10	4	–		3	0	36	12
PAOK	2018–19	Super League Greece	22	3	6	1	–		11 (Note: Six appearances and one goal in UEFA Champions League, five appearances and one goal in UEFA Europa League)	2	39	6
PAOK	2019–20	Super League Greece	19	3	4	4	–		4 (Note: Two appearances in UEFA Champions League, two appearances in UEFA Europa League)	0	27	7
PAOK	2020–21	Super League Greece	4	0	0	0	–		4 (Note: Appearances in UEFA Champions League)	2	8	2
PAOK	Total		125	21	37	15	–		39	8	201	44
Apollon Kalamarias (loan)	2013–14	Football League Greece	17	7	1	0	–		–		18	7
Vitória Setúbal (loan)	2014–15	Primeira Liga	24	2	1	0	5	3	–		30	5
Fenerbahçe	2020–21	Süper Lig	32	7	2	1	–		–		34	8
Fenerbahçe	2021–22	Süper Lig	23	4	2	0	–		8 (Note: Six appearances in UEFA Europa League, two appearances and one goal in UEFA Europa Conference League)	1	33	5
Fenerbahçe	Total		55	11	4	1	–		8	1	67	13
Hull City (loan)	2022–23	Championship	26	2	0	0	–		–		26	2
İstanbul Başakşehir	2023–24	Süper Lig	23	6	2	1	–		–		25	7
İstanbul Başakşehir	2024–25	Süper Lig	11	0	0	0	–		11 (Note: Eleven appearances and two goals in UEFA Europa Conference League)	2	22	2
İstanbul Başakşehir	Total		34	6	2	1	–		11	2	47	9
PAOK	2024–25	Super League Greece	13	2	0	0	–		2	0	15	2
PAOK	2025–26	Super League Greece	5	2	1	0	–		4	1	10	3
PAOK	Total		18	4	1	0	–		6	1	25	5
Career total			299	53	46	17	5	3	64	12	414	85

=== International ===
List of international goals scored by Dimitris Pelkas
No.	Date	Venue	Opponent	Score	Result	Competition
1	9 October 2021	Batumi Stadium, Batumi, Georgia	Georgia	2–0	2–0	2022 FIFA World Cup qualification
2	27 September 2022	Georgios Kamaras Stadium, Athens, Greece	Northern Ireland	1–0	3–1	2022–23 UEFA Nations League C
3	10 September 2023	Agia Sophia Stadium, Athens, Greece	Gibraltar	1–0	5–0	UEFA Euro 2024 qualification
4	21 March 2024	Agia Sophia Stadium, Athens, Greece	Kazakhstan	2–0	5–0	UEFA Euro 2024 qualification
5	11 June 2025	Pankritio Stadium, Heraklion, Greece	Bulgaria	1–0	4–0	Friendly

== Honours ==
PAOK

- Super League Greece: 2018–19
- Greek Cup: 2016–17, 2017–18, 2018–19
