= Stelios Malezas =

Greek footballer

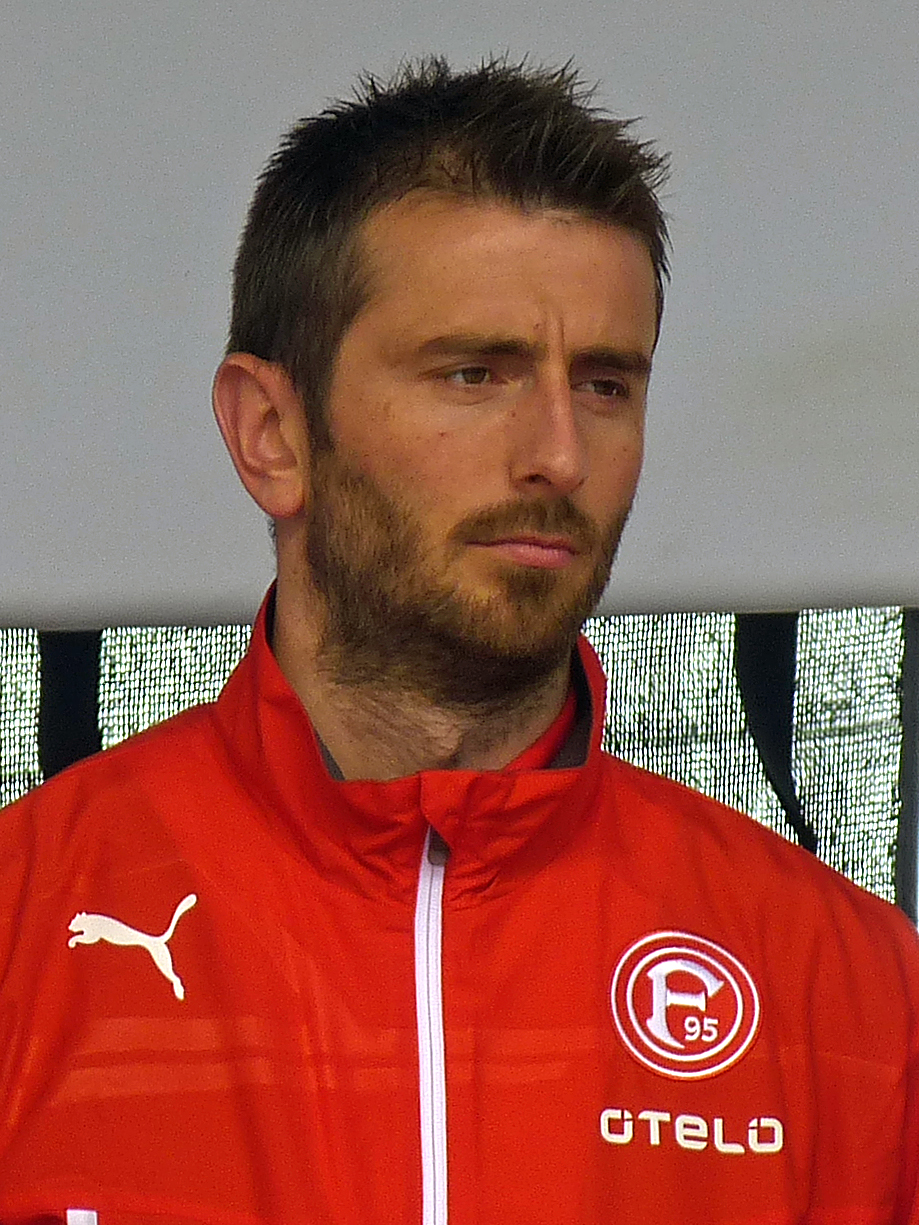
- Malezas in 2013

Personal information
- Date of birth: 11 March 1985 (age 41)
- Place of birth: Katerini, Greece
- Height: 1.93 m (6 ft 4 in)
- Position: Centre-back

Team information
- Current team: PAOK B (manager)

Youth career
- 2000–2003: Pontioi Katerini
- 2003–2004: PAOK

Senior career*
Years	Team	Apps	(Gls)
2004–2005	Irodotos	30	(1)
2005–2012	PAOK	129	(3)
2012–2014	Fortuna Düsseldorf	33	(0)
2014–2015	Panetolikos	25	(1)
2015–2019	PAOK	53	(1)
2019–2020	Xanthi	11	(0)
Total		281	(6)

International career
2010–2012	Greece	3	(0)

Managerial career
- 2020–2023: PAOK U19
- 2023–2024: Makedonikos
- 2024–2025: Kallithea
- 2025: AEL
- 2026: Niki Volos
- 2026–: PAOK B
- * Club domestic league appearances and goals

Stelios Malezas (Greek: Στέλιος Μαλεζάς; born 11 March 1985) is a Greek professional football manager and former player. He is the current manager Super League 2 club PAOK B.

== Club career ==
=== PAOK ===
He started his career at AEP Katerini and moved to PAOK in 2003, thus signing his first professional contract. He played as a centre back, having formerly played as a defensive midfielder. In the 2008–09 season, he gained his place in the starting eleven, making some regular first-team appearances. On 6 February 2009, he signed a new contract with PAOK, which would keep him at the club until 2013. During all these years he played 164 games with PAOK in all competitions.

=== Fortuna Düsseldorf ===
Defender Malezas of Greek club PAOK, is making the move to Germany for a reported fee of €577,000 (£450,000), with the money being paid in installments over the next 12 months. Malezas was on Monday undergoing a medical and Fortuna Düsseldorf, who last season won promotion via the play-offs, are then expected to officially announce a three-year contract. General manager Wolf Werner told Express newspaper: "We are about to sign Stelios Malezas from PAOK of Greece."

In December 2013, Malezas was informed that is already named for returning to his former club PAOK and in an interview held from PAOK24 he said: "As a mark of respect for the club, it must be clear that the given time there has been no communication with people of PAOK nor the possibility of my return to it. I have a contract with Fortuna until summer. I do not know what will happen in January and after that I have the right to negotiate, but as we speak there is absolutely not any communication with PAOK." Otherwise Malezas would not say no to the possibility of a return to PAOK, but this time there is nothing to confirm that he wants to leave Germany.

The German dream seems to take a fee for Stelios Malezas, who the summer of 2014 will be past for the roster of Fortuna Düsseldorf. He failed to prove his worth to the people of the German club and specifically, the former PAOK defender has only made 10 appearances after half of the season passed. The coach of Fortuna, Lorenz-Günther Köstner believes that the former Thessalonian player can not cope with the demands of the team, so it can be assumed that is almost in exit. Eventually on 23 May 2014 after two years with the club was informed that there was not in the staff's plan for next season. Malezas stated that " Everybody does not like goodbyes, but I must do it. I have no choice".

=== Panetolikos ===
On 11 July 2014, Malezas joined Panetolikos on a two-year contract, after he completed his transfer from Fortuna Düsseldorf as a free agent.

=== Return to PAOK ===
On 10 August 2015, Malezas joined for a second spell PAOK, signing a two-year contract for an undisclosed fee. His first year after his return, was disappointed but gradually became a member of the starting XI especially under Vladimir Ivić coaching. As a result of his performances, the administration of PAOK has decided to extend the contract of the experienced central defender. He is expected to sign a new two-season contract, as he was recently informed by athletic director of the club, Lubos Michel.

On 1 March 2017, PAOK made public his agreement for a one (plus one) year contract with the international defender, and Malezas was extremely happy as he signed with the team that showed him, in whose ranks he spent less than ten years. On 27 June 2017, the probability to continue his career in the club will be changed as there is interest from Russian Premier League club FC Anzhi Makhachkala. On 16 December 2017, PAOK achieved its second consecutive away victory at the 2017-18 season, against struggling Platanias at Perivolia Municipal Stadium, as the experienced central defender and captain of the Greek Cup winners, bagged the only goal of this clash, with a close-range effort at 56'. It was his first goal with the club since his return from summer of 2015. On 6 June 2018, experienced central defender and captain of PAOK, Stelios Malezas, will renew his contract with the Greek Cup winners until the end of 2018–19 season. The owner and president of historic Thessaloniki club, Ivan Savvidis, had publicly promised after victory over AEK at 2017-18 Greek Cup final that the contract of 33-year-old international defender will be extended, something which was officially announced.

=== Xanthi ===
On 24 June 2019, Malezas joined Xanthi, after he completed his transfer from PAOK as a free agent.

== International career ==
On 28 February 2010, he was called up to represent Greece in a friendly against Senegal. On 1 June it was announced that he would be in the 23-man squad for the 2010 FIFA World Cup. He was also to the 23-man squad for the UEFA Euro 2012.

== Career statistics ==
As of 23 December 2019

Appearances and goals by club, season and competition
Club	Season	League			Cup (Note: Includes Greek Cup.)		Europe		Total	
Club	Season	Division	Apps	Goals	Apps	Goals	Apps	Goals	Apps	Goals
Irodotos	2004–05	Gamma Ethniki	30	1	4	0	0	0	34	1
PAOK	2005–06	Super League Greece	2	0	1	0	0	0	3	0
PAOK	2006–07	Super League Greece	10	0	0	0	0	0	10	0
PAOK	2007–08	Super League Greece	11	1	0	0	0	0	11	1
PAOK	2008–09	Super League Greece	29	1	3	0	0	0	32	1
PAOK	2009–10	Super League Greece	26	1	3	0	2	0	31	1
PAOK	2010–11	Super League Greece	18	0	1	0	4	1	23	1
PAOK	2011–12	Super League Greece	33	0	3	0	12	0	48	0
Fortuna Düsseldorf	2012–13	Bundesliga	21	0	1	0	0	0	22	0
Fortuna Düsseldorf	2013–14	2. Bundesliga	12	0	0	0	0	0	12	0
Panetolikos	2014–15	Super League Greece	25	1	2	0	0	0	27	1
PAOK	2015–16	Super League Greece	18	0	2	0	5	0	25	0
PAOK	2016–17	Super League Greece	27	0	8	0	3	0	38	0
PAOK	2017–18	Super League Greece	7	1	9	0	0	0	16	1
PAOK	2018–19	Super League Greece	1	0	3	0	0	0	4	0
Xanthi	2019–20	Super League Greece	11	0	1	0	0	0	11	0
Career total			280	6	41	0	26	1	349	7

== Managerial statistics ==
As of match played 21 September 2026

Team	From	To	Record				
Team	From	To	G	W	D	L	Win %
PAOK U19	1 November 2020	9 August 2023	59	37	12	10	62.71
Makedonikos	3 September 2023	30 October 2024	39	13	14	12	33.33
Kallithea	23 December 2024	8 June 2025	20	8	3	9	40.00
AEL	7 October 2025	7 December 2025	9	1	1	7	11.11
Niki Volos	5 June 2026	21 September 2026	6	1	0	5	16.67
Total			134	61	30	43	45.52

== Honours ==
=== Player ===
PAOK

- Super League Greece: 2018–19
- Greek Cup: 2016–17, 2017–18, 2018–19

=== Manager ===
PAOK U19

- Superleague Greece Youth: 2020–21
